= 2004 Wimbledon Championships – Men's singles qualifying =

Men's singles qualifying
- 2004 Wimbledon Championships

Events
Singles	men	women		boys	girls
Doubles	men	women	mixed	boys	girls
WC Singles	men	women	quad
WC Doubles	men	women	quad
Legends	men	women	seniors

Qualification
Singles	men	women
Doubles	men	women
- Wimbledon Championships

Players and pairs who neither have high enough rankings nor receive wild cards may participate in a qualifying tournament held one week before the annual Wimbledon Tennis Championships.

== Seeds ==
1. (France) Julien Benneteau (qualifying competition, lucky loser)
2. (France) Olivier Mutis (second round)
3. (South Korea) Lee Hyung-taik (second round)
4. (France) Richard Gasquet (qualified)
5. (France) Nicolas Mahut (second round)
6. (Italy) Davide Sanguinetti (qualifying competition, lucky loser)
7. (Czech Republic) Jan Hernych (qualified)
8. (Belgium) Christophe Rochus (qualified)
9. (Chile) Adrián García (first round, retired)
10. (United States) Jeff Morrison (first round)
11. (United States) Alex Bogomolov Jr. (first round)
12. (Czech Republic) Tomáš Zíb (first round)
13. (Argentina) Juan Mónaco (withdrew)
14. (Israel) Harel Levy (first round)
15. (Austria) Alexander Peya (qualifying competition, lucky loser)
16. (Italy) Potito Starace (qualifying competition, lucky loser)
17. (Argentina) Juan Pablo Guzmán (first round)
18. (Switzerland) Ivo Heuberger (qualified)
19. (Colombia) Alejandro Falla (qualified)
20. (United States) Paul Goldstein (second round)
21. (Luxembourg) Gilles Müller (first round)
22. (United States) Glenn Weiner (qualified)
23. (Czech Republic) Jiří Vaněk (second round)
24. (Belgium) Dick Norman (first round)
25. (Italy) Stefano Pescosolido (qualifying competition, lucky loser)
26. (Brazil) Ricardo Mello (first round)
27. (Spain) Santiago Ventura (second round)
28. (Spain) Guillermo García López (first round)
29. (Croatia) Roko Karanušić (second round)
30. (United States) Robert Kendrick (second round)
31. (Italy) Alessio di Mauro (first round)
32. (Serbia and Montenegro) Janko Tipsarević (qualified)

== Qualifiers ==
1. (United Kingdom) Jamie Delgado
2. (Brazil) André Sá
3. (Spain) Iván Navarro
4. (France) Richard Gasquet
5. (Paraguay) Ramón Delgado
6. (United States) Glenn Weiner
7. (Czech Republic) Jan Hernych
8. (Belgium) Christophe Rochus
9. (Colombia) Alejandro Falla
10. (Switzerland) Ivo Heuberger
11. (Italy) Daniele Bracciali
12. (Chinese Taipei) Wang Yeu-tzuoo
13. (France) Olivier Patience
14. (Austria) Julian Knowle
15. (Israel) Andy Ram
16. (Serbia and Montenegro) Janko Tipsarević

== Lucky losers ==
1. (France) Julien Benneteau
2. (Italy) Davide Sanguinetti
3. (Austria) Alexander Peya
4. (Italy) Potito Starace
5. (Italy) Stefano Pescosolido

== Qualifying draw ==
=== First qualifier ===
First round
1/WC	(France) Julien Benneteau	6	6
(France) Nicolas Coutelot	1	4
WC	(United Kingdom) Chris Lewis	1	1
(France) Stéphane Robert	6	6
(Argentina) Mariano Delfino	2	4
WC	(United Kingdom) Jamie Delgado	6	6
(Argentina) Federico Browne	3	6	8
24	(Belgium) Dick Norman	6	4	6

Second round
1/WC	(France) Julien Benneteau	6	1	13
(France) Stéphane Robert	3	6	11
WC	(United Kingdom) Jamie Delgado	6	7^{7}
(Argentina) Federico Browne	3	6^{2}

Qualifying competition
1/WC	(France) Julien Benneteau	7	4	6	4	3
WC	(United Kingdom) Jamie Delgado	5	6	4	6	6

=== Second qualifier ===
First round
2	(France) Olivier Mutis	6	6
(Germany) Alexander Waske	3	4
WC	(United States) Bob Bryan	6	6
(Italy) Francesco Aldi	3	4
(Argentina) Andrés Dellatorre	3	0
(Brazil) André Sá	6	6
(Cyprus) Marcos Baghdatis	5	4
20	(United States) Paul Goldstein	7	6

Second round
2	(France) Olivier Mutis	7	3	2
WC	(United States) Bob Bryan	5	6	6
(Brazil) André Sá	6	7
20	(United States) Paul Goldstein	2	5

Qualifying competition
WC	(United States) Bob Bryan	2	4	3
(Brazil) André Sá	6	6	6

=== Third qualifier ===
First round
3	(South Korea) Lee Hyung-taik	6	6
(Italy) Tomas Tenconi	3	1
(Spain) Iván Navarro	7	6
(Chile) Hermes Gamonal	5	4
(Japan) Gouichi Motomura	6	3	7
(Italy) Leonardo Azzaro	2	6	9
(Brazil) Bruno Soares	4	6^{4}
27	(Spain) Santiago Ventura	6	7^{7}

Second round
3	(South Korea) Lee Hyung-taik	6	4	2
(Spain) Iván Navarro	4	6	6
(Italy) Leonardo Azzaro	6	6
27	(Spain) Santiago Ventura	4	4

Qualifying competition
(Spain) Iván Navarro	7	3	4	6	7
(Italy) Leonardo Azzaro	5	6	6	4	5

=== Fourth qualifier ===
First round
4	(France) Richard Gasquet	3	7	7
(United States) Brian Vahaly	6	5	5
(Argentina) Sergio Roitman	3	6	6
(Spain) Salvador Navarro	6	4	3
(Italy) Andreas Seppi	6	6
(Canada) Simon Larose	4	2
(France) Florent Serra	7	6
28	(Spain) Guillermo García López	5	4

Second round
4	(France) Richard Gasquet	6	6
(Argentina) Sergio Roitman	2	1
(Italy) Andreas Seppi	6^{4}	5
(France) Florent Serra	7^{7}	7

Qualifying competition
4	(France) Richard Gasquet	3	6	6	7
(France) Florent Serra	6	4	4	5

=== Fifth qualifier ===
First round
5	(France) Nicolas Mahut	6	3	6
(Brazil) Franco Ferreiro	4	6	2
(Spain) Javier Genaro-Martínez	1	1
(Paraguay) Ramón Delgado	6	6
(France) Jean-François Bachelot	6	3	6
(Bulgaria) Ivaylo Traykov	4	6	3
(United States) Justin Gimelstob	6	6
17	(Argentina) Juan Pablo Guzmán	3	2

Second round
5	(France) Nicolas Mahut	3	2
(Paraguay) Ramón Delgado	6	6
(France) Jean-François Bachelot	3	6	2
(United States) Justin Gimelstob	6	3	6

Qualifying competition
(Paraguay) Ramón Delgado	2	6	6	6
(United States) Justin Gimelstob	6	0	2	4

=== Sixth qualifier ===
First round
6	(Italy) Davide Sanguinetti	5	6	7
(Mexico) Miguel Gallardo Valles	7	2	5
(Spain) Francisco Fogués	6	3	4
(India) Prakash Amritraj	4	6	6
(Serbia and Montenegro) Dušan Vemić	4	2
(Italy) Vincenzo Santopadre	6	6
(Italy) Uros Vico	2	6	1
22	(United States) Glenn Weiner	6	2	6

Second round
6	(Italy) Davide Sanguinetti	6	6
(India) Prakash Amritraj	4	3
(Italy) Vincenzo Santopadre	6^{1}	6	4
22	(United States) Glenn Weiner	7^{7}	4	6

Qualifying competition
6	(Italy) Davide Sanguinetti	6^{6}	6	6^{3}	4
22	(United States) Glenn Weiner	7^{8}	3	7^{7}	6

=== Seventh qualifier ===
First round
7	(Czech Republic) Jan Hernych	6	6
(Mexico) Santiago González	0	1
(United States) Kevin Kim	6	4	16
(Italy) Giorgio Galimberti	1	6	14
(South Africa) Rik de Voest	3	6	3
(Japan) Takao Suzuki	6	4	6
(Italy) Stefano Cobolli	1	3
30	(United States) Robert Kendrick	6	6

Second round
7	(Czech Republic) Jan Hernych	6	6
(United States) Kevin Kim	0	0
(Japan) Takao Suzuki	7^{7}	6
30	(United States) Robert Kendrick	6^{0}	2

Qualifying competition
7	(Czech Republic) Jan Hernych	6	6	5	6
(Japan) Takao Suzuki	1	2	7	2

=== Eighth qualifier ===
First round
8	(Belgium) Christophe Rochus	6	7
(Canada) Frank Dancevic	1	5
(France) Jean-Michel Pequery	1	4
(France) Jean-Christophe Faurel	6	6
(Thailand) Danai Udomchoke	6	6
(Mexico) Alejandro Hernández	3	2
(Italy) Paolo Lorenzi	4	5
23	(Czech Republic) Jiří Vaněk	6	7

Second round
8	(Belgium) Christophe Rochus	6	3	6
(France) Jean-Christophe Faurel	3	6	1
(Thailand) Danai Udomchoke	6	6^{2}	10
23	(Czech Republic) Jiří Vaněk	2	7^{7}	8

Qualifying competition
8	(Belgium) Christophe Rochus	4	6	4	6	8
(Thailand) Danai Udomchoke	6	3	6	1	6

=== Ninth qualifier ===
First round
9	(Chile) Adrián García	1	3^{r}
(Switzerland) Marco Chiudinelli	6	5
(Spain) Juan Albert Viloca	2	2
(Slovakia) Michal Mertiňák	6	6
(France) Julien Varlet	4	4
(Finland) Tuomas Ketola	6	6
(Italy) Massimo Dell'Acqua	6^{4}	6	4
19/WC	(Colombia) Alejandro Falla	7^{7}	4	6

Second round
(Switzerland) Marco Chiudinelli	5	5
(Slovakia) Michal Mertiňák	7	7
(Finland) Tuomas Ketola	3	5
19/WC	(Colombia) Alejandro Falla	6	7

Qualifying competition
(Slovakia) Michal Mertiňák	6^{8}	3	6	6	7
19/WC	(Colombia) Alejandro Falla	7^{10}	6	4	3	9

=== Tenth qualifier ===
First round
10	(United States) Jeff Morrison	5	4
(Germany) Dieter Kindlmann	7	6
(Norway) Jan Frode Andersen	6	1	4
PR	(France) Jérôme Golmard	3	6	6
(Philippines) Cecil Mamiit	6	3	8
(France) Nicolas Thomann	1	6	6
(Argentina) Diego Moyano	4	2
18	(Switzerland) Ivo Heuberger	6	6

Second round
(Germany) Dieter Kindlmann	6^{3}	7^{7}	6
PR	(France) Jérôme Golmard	7^{7}	6^{2}	2
(Philippines) Cecil Mamiit	3	2
18	(Switzerland) Ivo Heuberger	6	6

Qualifying competition
(Germany) Dieter Kindlmann	6^{3}	1	7^{9}	2
18	(Switzerland) Ivo Heuberger	7^{7}	6	6^{7}	6

=== Eleventh qualifier ===
First round
11	(United States) Alex Bogomolov Jr.	6	6^{5}	1
(Czech Republic) Petr Kralert	4	7^{7}	6
(Russia) Yuri Schukin	4	4
(Italy) Daniele Bracciali	6	6
(Brazil) Marcos Daniel	2	6	6
(Azerbaijan) Emin Ağayev	6	1	2
(Sweden) Björn Rehnquist	0	2
25	(Italy) Stefano Pescosolido	6	6

Second round
(Czech Republic) Petr Kralert	2	1
(Italy) Daniele Bracciali	6	6
(Brazil) Marcos Daniel	1	2
25	(Italy) Stefano Pescosolido	6	6

Qualifying competition
(Italy) Daniele Bracciali	6	2	7	6
25	(Italy) Stefano Pescosolido	2	6	5	4

=== Twelfth qualifier ===
First round
12	(Czech Republic) Tomáš Zíb	7^{7}	3	1
(Ecuador) Giovanni Lapentti	6^{5}	6	6
WC	(United Kingdom) Andrew Banks	7^{7}	2	2
(Spain) Óscar Serrano	6^{3}	6	6
(Chinese Taipei) Wang Yeu-tzuoo	6	6
(Czech Republic) Jaroslav Pospíšil	3	4
(Spain) Fernando Vicente	3	7	7
31	(Italy) Alessio di Mauro	6	5	5

Second round
(Ecuador) Giovanni Lapentti	4	7^{10}	6
(Spain) Óscar Serrano	6	6^{8}	2
(Chinese Taipei) Wang Yeu-tzuoo	6	6
(Spain) Fernando Vicente	3	4

Qualifying competition
(Ecuador) Giovanni Lapentti	0	5	6^{0}
(Chinese Taipei) Wang Yeu-tzuoo	6	7	7^{7}

=== Thirteenth qualifier ===
First round
Alt	(France) Olivier Patience	4	7^{7}	6
(Canada) Frédéric Niemeyer	6	6^{2}	3
WC	(Romania) Florin Mergea	6	7^{11}
(United States) Eric Taino	3	6^{9}
(Romania) Răzvan Sabău	7^{7}	3	5
(South Africa) Wesley Whitehouse	6^{5}	6	7
(Switzerland) Michel Kratochvil	2	6	7
26	(Brazil) Ricardo Mello	7	1	5

Second round
Alt	(France) Olivier Patience	7^{7}	6
WC	(Romania) Florin Mergea	6^{5}	4
(South Africa) Wesley Whitehouse	7^{8}	6
(Switzerland) Michel Kratochvil	6^{6}	3

Qualifying competition
Alt	(France) Olivier Patience	7^{7}	7^{8}	0	1	6
(South Africa) Wesley Whitehouse	6^{5}	6^{6}	6	6	3

=== Fourteenth qualifier ===
First round
14	(Israel) Harel Levy	1	4
(Czech Republic) Ivo Minář	6	6
(Serbia and Montenegro) Boris Pašanski	2	1
(France) Nicolas Devilder	6	6
(Russia) Igor Kunitsyn	6	6
(Argentina) Juan Pablo Brzezicki	2	2
(Austria) Julian Knowle	6	6
21	(Luxembourg) Gilles Müller	4	3

Second round
(Czech Republic) Ivo Minář	6	7^{7}
(France) Nicolas Devilder	4	6^{2}
(Russia) Igor Kunitsyn	2	3
(Austria) Julian Knowle	6	6

Qualifying competition
(Czech Republic) Ivo Minář	0	5	7^{7}	3
(Austria) Julian Knowle	6	7	6^{2}	6

=== Fifteenth qualifier ===
First round
15	(Austria) Alexander Peya	6	4	6
(Peru) Iván Miranda	3	6	4
(France) Sébastien de Chaunac	4	6	4
(Germany) Markus Hantschk	6	2	6
WC	(United Kingdom) Ian Flanagan	1	0
WC	(Israel) Andy Ram	6	6
(France) Édouard Roger-Vasselin	4	5
29	(Croatia) Roko Karanušić	6	7

Second round
15	(Austria) Alexander Peya	2	6	6
(Germany) Markus Hantschk	6	1	1
WC	(Israel) Andy Ram	6	6
29	(Croatia) Roko Karanušić	3	3

Qualifying competition
15	(Austria) Alexander Peya	6^{7}	3	7^{7}	4
WC	(Israel) Andy Ram	7^{9}	6	6^{1}	6

=== Sixteenth qualifier ===
First round
16	(Italy) Potito Starace	1	7^{7}	6
(United States) Matías Boeker	6	6^{4}	4
(Argentina) Ignacio González King	6	6
(Spain) Didac Pérez	3	2
(Germany) Michael Berrer	7^{7}	3	6
(Czech Republic) Martin Štěpánek	6^{5}	6	4
(Slovakia) Viktor Bruthans	4	1
32	(Serbia and Montenegro) Janko Tipsarević	6	6

Second round
16	(Italy) Potito Starace	7^{8}	6
(Argentina) Ignacio González King	6^{6}	3
(Germany) Michael Berrer	2	3
32	(Serbia and Montenegro) Janko Tipsarević	6	6

Qualifying competition
16	(Italy) Potito Starace	1	4	2
32	(Serbia and Montenegro) Janko Tipsarević	6	6	6
