= 2004 Wimbledon Championships – Women's doubles qualifying =

Women's doubles qualifying
- 2004 Wimbledon Championships

Events
Singles	men	women		boys	girls
Doubles	men	women	mixed	boys	girls
WC Singles	men	women	quad
WC Doubles	men	women	quad
Legends	men	women	seniors

Qualification
Singles	men	women
Doubles	men	women
- Wimbledon Championships

Players and pairs who neither have high enough rankings nor receive wild cards may participate in a qualifying tournament held one week before the annual Wimbledon Tennis Championships.

== Seeds ==
1. (Austria) Barbara Schwartz / (Germany) Jasmin Wöhr (qualifying competition, lucky losers)
2. (Russia) Gulnara Fattakhetdinova / (Turkey) İpek Şenoğlu (first round)
3. (Bulgaria) Lubomira Bacheva / (Czech Republic) Eva Birnerová (qualified)
4. (United States) Amanda Augustus / (South Africa) Natalie Grandin (qualifying competition, lucky losers)
5. (New Zealand) Leanne Baker / (Australia) Nicole Sewell (qualified)
6. (Latvia) Līga Dekmeijere / (France) Stéphanie Foretz (first round)
7. (Ukraine) Mariya Koryttseva / (Russia) Galina Voskoboeva (qualifying competition)
8. (Australia) Evie Dominikovic / (Russia) Anastasia Rodionova (qualified)

== Qualifiers ==
1. (New Zealand) Leanne Baker / (Australia) Nicole Sewell
2. (South Korea) Jeon Mi-ra / (Japan) Yuka Yoshida
3. (Bulgaria) Lubomira Bacheva / (Czech Republic) Eva Birnerová
4. (Australia) Evie Dominikovic / (Russia) Anastasia Rodionova

== Lucky losers ==
1. (Austria) Barbara Schwartz / (Germany) Jasmin Wöhr
2. (United States) Amanda Augustus / (South Africa) Natalie Grandin
3. (Republic of Ireland) Claire Curran / (United Kingdom) Jane O'Donoghue

== Qualifying draw ==
=== First qualifier ===
First round
1	(Austria) Barbara Schwartz (Germany) Jasmin Wöhr	6	1	6
(United States) Ashley Harkleroad (Japan) Saori Obata	0	6	2
(China) Peng Shuai (China) Xie Yanze	4	6	3
5	(New Zealand) Leanne Baker (Australia) Nicole Sewell	6	4	6

Qualifying competition
1	(Austria) Barbara Schwartz (Germany) Jasmin Wöhr	3	6	3
5	(New Zealand) Leanne Baker (Australia) Nicole Sewell	6	3	6

=== Second qualifier ===
First round
2	(Russia) Gulnara Fattakhetdinova (Turkey) İpek Şenoğlu	0	6	4
(South Korea) Jeon Mi-ra (Japan) Yuka Yoshida	6	3	6
(Brazil) Maria Fernanda Alves (Ukraine) Yuliana Fedak	6	1	6
6	(Latvia) Līga Dekmeijere (France) Stéphanie Foretz	3	6	1

Qualifying competition
(South Korea) Jeon Mi-ra (Japan) Yuka Yoshida	2	7	9
(Brazil) Maria Fernanda Alves (Ukraine) Yuliana Fedak	6	5	7

=== Third qualifier ===
First round
3	(Bulgaria) Lubomira Bacheva (Czech Republic) Eva Birnerová	3	6	6
(France) Séverine Beltrame (France) Stéphanie Cohen-Aloro	6	3	4
(United States) Julie Ditty (India) Sania Mirza	4	3
7	(Ukraine) Mariya Koryttseva (Russia) Galina Voskoboeva	6	6

Qualifying competition
3	(Bulgaria) Lubomira Bacheva (Czech Republic) Eva Birnerová	6	7
7	(Ukraine) Mariya Koryttseva (Russia) Galina Voskoboeva	4	5

=== Fourth qualifier ===
First round
4	(United States) Amanda Augustus (South Africa) Natalie Grandin	6	7
(Sweden) Sofia Arvidsson (Canada) Maureen Drake	3	5
WC	(Republic of Ireland) Claire Curran (United Kingdom) Jane O'Donoghue	4	6	1
8	(Australia) Evie Dominikovic (Russia) Anastasia Rodionova	6	3	6

Qualifying competition
4	(United States) Amanda Augustus (South Africa) Natalie Grandin	6	3	6
8	(Australia) Evie Dominikovic (Russia) Anastasia Rodionova	2	6	8
