= 2004 Wimbledon Championships – Men's doubles qualifying =

Men's doubles qualifying
- 2004 Wimbledon Championships

Events
Singles	men	women		boys	girls
Doubles	men	women	mixed	boys	girls
WC Singles	men	women	quad
WC Doubles	men	women	quad
Legends	men	women	seniors

Qualification
Singles	men	women
Doubles	men	women
- Wimbledon Championships

Players and pairs who neither have high enough rankings nor receive wild cards may participate in a qualifying tournament held one week before the annual Wimbledon Tennis Championships.

== Seeds ==
1. (Austria) Alexander Peya / (Germany) Alexander Waske (first round)
2. (United States) Devin Bowen / (United States) Tripp Phillips (qualifying competition, lucky losers)
3. (South Africa) Rik de Voest / (Australia) Nathan Healey (qualified)
4. (United States) Diego Ayala / (United States) Brian Vahaly (qualifying competition, lucky losers)
5. (Australia) Stephen Huss / (Sweden) Robert Lindstedt (qualified)
6. (Italy) Daniele Bracciali / (Italy) Giorgio Galimberti (qualified)
7. (Hungary) Gergely Kisgyörgy / (Poland) Łukasz Kubot (qualified)
8. (Denmark) Kenneth Carlsen / (Finland) Tuomas Ketola (qualifying competition, lucky losers)

== Qualifiers ==
1. (Australia) Stephen Huss / (Sweden) Robert Lindstedt
2. (Hungary) Gergely Kisgyörgy / (Poland) Łukasz Kubot
3. (South Africa) Rik de Voest / (Australia) Nathan Healey
4. (Italy) Daniele Bracciali / (Italy) Giorgio Galimberti

== Lucky losers ==
1. (United States) Devin Bowen / (United States) Tripp Phillips
2. (United States) Diego Ayala / (United States) Brian Vahaly
3. (Denmark) Kenneth Carlsen / (Finland) Tuomas Ketola

== Qualifying draw ==
=== First qualifier ===
First round
1	(Austria) Alexander Peya (Germany) Alexander Waske	6	6^{10}	3
(United States) Brandon Coupe (United States) Glenn Weiner	4	7^{12}	6
(United States) Paul Goldstein (United States) Jeff Morrison	4	4
5	(Australia) Stephen Huss (Sweden) Robert Lindstedt	6	6

Qualifying competition
(United States) Brandon Coupe (United States) Glenn Weiner	2	4	5
5	(Australia) Stephen Huss (Sweden) Robert Lindstedt	6	6	7

=== Second qualifier ===
First round
2	(United States) Devin Bowen (United States) Tripp Phillips	6	7
(Chile) Adrián García (Argentina) Juan Pablo Guzmán	3	5
(United States) Jason Marshall (Czech Republic) Tomáš Zíb	7^{7}	6^{6}	9
7	(Hungary) Gergely Kisgyörgy (Poland) Łukasz Kubot	6^{3}	7^{8}	11

Qualifying competition
2	(United States) Devin Bowen (United States) Tripp Phillips	5	6^{2}	4
7	(Hungary) Gergely Kisgyörgy (Poland) Łukasz Kubot	7	7^{7}	6

=== Third qualifier ===
First round
3	(South Africa) Rik de Voest (Australia) Nathan Healey	6	2	6
(Italy) Manuel Jorquera (Italy) Davide Sanguinetti	3	6	2
(Czech Republic) Jan Hernych (Czech Republic) Jiří Vaněk	1	1
8	(Denmark) Kenneth Carlsen (Finland) Tuomas Ketola	6	6

Qualifying competition
3	(South Africa) Rik de Voest (Australia) Nathan Healey	6	6	4	4	7
8	(Denmark) Kenneth Carlsen (Finland) Tuomas Ketola	2	2	6	6	5

=== Fourth qualifier ===
First round
4	(United States) Diego Ayala (United States) Brian Vahaly	7^{7}	6
WC	(United Kingdom) Oliver Freelove (United Kingdom) Chris Lewis	6^{3}	3
(France) Richard Gasquet (Brazil) Bruno Soares	1	4
6	(Italy) Daniele Bracciali (Italy) Giorgio Galimberti	6	6

Qualifying competition
4	(United States) Diego Ayala (United States) Brian Vahaly	3	2	2
6	(Italy) Daniele Bracciali (Italy) Giorgio Galimberti	6	6	6
