= 2004 Wimbledon Championships – Women's singles qualifying =

Women's singles qualifying
- 2004 Wimbledon Championships

Events
Singles	men	women		boys	girls
Doubles	men	women	mixed	boys	girls
WC Singles	men	women	quad
WC Doubles	men	women	quad
Legends	men	women	seniors

Qualification
Singles	men	women
Doubles	men	women
- Wimbledon Championships

Players and pairs who neither have high enough rankings nor receive wild cards may participate in a qualifying tournament held one week before the annual Wimbledon Tennis Championships.

== Seeds ==
1. (Italy) Roberta Vinci (qualifying competition)
2. (Ukraine) Yuliana Fedak (first round)
3. (Sweden) Sofia Arvidsson (qualifying competition)
4. (China) Sun Tiantian (qualified)
5. (United States) Mashona Washington (qualified)
6. (Czech Republic) Eva Birnerová (qualified)
7. (France) Virginie Razzano (qualified)
8. (France) Camille Pin (first round)
9. (Germany) Barbara Rittner (qualifying competition)
10. (Ukraine) Yuliya Beygelzimer (qualified)
11. (Germany) Stephanie Gehrlein (first round)
12. (France) Virginie Pichet (first round)
13. (Czech Republic) Zuzana Ondrášková (second round)
14. (Russia) Tatiana Panova (qualified)
15. (United States) Alexandra Stevenson (qualifying competition)
16. (Spain) Conchita Martínez Granados (first round)
17. (Argentina) Mariana Díaz Oliva (first round)
18. (United States) Kelly McCain (first round)
19. (Germany) Julia Schruff (second round)
20. (Italy) Adriana Serra Zanetti (second round)
21. (Indonesia) Angelique Widjaja (qualified)
22. (Japan) Yuka Yoshida (first round)
23. (Israel) Tzipora Obziler (qualifying competition)
24. (Czech Republic) Lenka Němečková (first round)

== Qualifiers ==
1. (Spain) Nuria Llagostera Vives
2. (Indonesia) Angelique Widjaja
3. (Russia) Tatiana Panova
4. (China) Sun Tiantian
5. (United States) Mashona Washington
6. (Czech Republic) Eva Birnerová
7. (France) Virginie Razzano
8. (United States) Jennifer Hopkins
9. (France) Stéphanie Foretz
10. (Ukraine) Yuliya Beygelzimer
11. (Romania) Edina Gallovits
12. (Australia) Christina Wheeler

== Qualifying draw ==
=== First qualifier ===
First round
1	(Italy) Roberta Vinci	6	6^{6}	6
(Russia) Lioudmila Skavronskaia	3	7^{8}	3
(United States) Abigail Spears	6^{4}	3
(United States) Lilia Osterloh	7^{7}	6
(Spain) Nuria Llagostera Vives	3	6	6
(Austria) Sybille Bammer	6	4	0
(United States) Meilen Tu	7^{7}	6
18	(United States) Kelly McCain	6^{3}	0

Second round
1	(Italy) Roberta Vinci	6	6
(United States) Lilia Osterloh	4	1
(Spain) Nuria Llagostera Vives	4	6	6
(United States) Meilen Tu	6	3	0

Qualifying competition
1	(Italy) Roberta Vinci	6	6^{2}	1
(Spain) Nuria Llagostera Vives	2	7^{7}	6

=== Second qualifier ===
First round
2	(Ukraine) Yuliana Fedak	3	4
(South Africa) Natalie Grandin	6	6
(Russia) Evgenia Linetskaya	6	6
(Hungary) Zsófia Gubacsi	0	1
(Ukraine) Alona Bondarenko	6	6
(Germany) Angelika Bachmann	0	1
(Czech Republic) Alena Vašková	2	1
21	(Indonesia) Angelique Widjaja	6	6

Second round
(South Africa) Natalie Grandin	3	2
(Russia) Evgenia Linetskaya	6	6
(Ukraine) Alona Bondarenko	4	1
21	(Indonesia) Angelique Widjaja	6	6

Qualifying competition
(Russia) Evgenia Linetskaya	6	6^{8}	1
21	(Indonesia) Angelique Widjaja	4	7^{10}	6

=== Third qualifier ===
First round
3	(Sweden) Sofia Arvidsson	6	6
(Slovakia) Stanislava Hrozenská	4	2
(Czech Republic) Libuše Průšová	6	6
(Hungary) Virág Németh	4	2
(Australia) Evie Dominikovic	7^{7}	1	6
(China) Li Ting	6^{4}	6	4
(Japan) Miho Saeki	3	1
14	(Russia) Tatiana Panova	6	6

Second round
3	(Sweden) Sofia Arvidsson	6	3	8
(Czech Republic) Libuše Průšová	3	6	6
(Australia) Evie Dominikovic	6	5	3
14	(Russia) Tatiana Panova	2	7	6

Qualifying competition
3	(Sweden) Sofia Arvidsson	6	4	1
14	(Russia) Tatiana Panova	2	6	6

=== Fourth qualifier ===
First round
4	(China) Sun Tiantian	6	6
(Ukraine) Alexandra Kravets	0	2
(Argentina) Natalia Gussoni	3	6	6
(Austria) Patricia Wartusch	6	4	3
(Germany) Nina Dübbers	7^{7}	6^{3}	5
WC	(Austria) Barbara Schwartz	6^{2}	7^{7}	7
(Canada) Marie-Ève Pelletier	4	6	6
17	(Argentina) Mariana Díaz Oliva	6	2	0

Second round
4	(China) Sun Tiantian	4	6	6
(Argentina) Natalia Gussoni	6	4	3
WC	(Austria) Barbara Schwartz	6	6
(Canada) Marie-Ève Pelletier	0	0

Qualifying competition
4	(China) Sun Tiantian	6^{3}	7	6
WC	(Austria) Barbara Schwartz	7^{7}	5	3

=== Fifth qualifier ===
First round
5	(United States) Mashona Washington	6	6
(Czech Republic) Michaela Paštiková	2	4
(United States) Ansley Cargill	4	7^{7}	2
(Poland) Marta Domachowska	6	6^{3}	6
(China) Xie Yanze	3	7^{9}	3
(Puerto Rico) Vilmarie Castellvi	6	6^{7}	6
(United States) Jessica Lehnhoff	4	1
20	(Italy) Adriana Serra Zanetti	6	6

Second round
5	(United States) Mashona Washington	6	7^{7}
(Poland) Marta Domachowska	4	6^{3}
(Puerto Rico) Vilmarie Castellvi	7^{7}	6
20	(Italy) Adriana Serra Zanetti	6^{4}	3

Qualifying competition
5	(United States) Mashona Washington	6	2	6
(Puerto Rico) Vilmarie Castellvi	3	6	2

=== Sixth qualifier ===
First round
6	(Czech Republic) Eva Birnerová	6	6^{5}	6
WC	(United Kingdom) Holly Bagshaw	1	7^{7}	4
(United States) Bethanie Mattek	6	6
WC	(United Kingdom) Melanie South	2	2
(Germany) Adriana Barna	2	4
(Russia) Galina Voskoboeva	6	6
WC	(United Kingdom) Cristelle Grier	7	4	4
15	(United States) Alexandra Stevenson	5	6	6

Second round
6	(Czech Republic) Eva Birnerová	3	6	6
(United States) Bethanie Mattek	6	1	1
(Russia) Galina Voskoboeva	6^{5}	6	8
15	(United States) Alexandra Stevenson	7^{7}	3	10

Qualifying competition
6	(Czech Republic) Eva Birnerová	7^{9}	7^{7}
15	(United States) Alexandra Stevenson	6^{7}	6^{4}

=== Seventh qualifier ===
First round
7	(France) Virginie Razzano	7^{7}	6^{4}	6
(Hungary) Kira Nagy	6^{5}	7^{7}	2
(Belarus) Tatiana Poutchek	6	7
(Chinese Taipei) Janet Lee	0	5
(Estonia) Maret Ani	6	6
(Czech Republic) Nicole Vaidišová	2	4
(South Korea) Cho Yoon-jeong	6	3	8
22	(Japan) Yuka Yoshida	4	6	6

Second round
7	(France) Virginie Razzano	0	6	6
(Belarus) Tatiana Poutchek	6	2	1
(Estonia) Maret Ani	6	6
(South Korea) Cho Yoon-jeong	1	2

Qualifying competition
7	(France) Virginie Razzano	6	6
(Estonia) Maret Ani	3	4

=== Eighth qualifier ===
First round
8	(France) Camille Pin	6	2	2
(United States) Jennifer Hopkins	4	6	6
WC	(United Kingdom) Chantal Coombs	0	1^{r}
(France) Capucine Rousseau	6	2
(Slovakia) Zuzana Kučová	6	2	4
(Slovakia) Jarmila Gajdošová	3	6	6
(Thailand) Suchanun Viratprasert	5	3
13	(Czech Republic) Zuzana Ondrášková	7	6

Second round
(United States) Jennifer Hopkins	6	6
(France) Capucine Rousseau	3	4
(Slovakia) Jarmila Gajdošová	7^{7}	6
13	(Czech Republic) Zuzana Ondrášková	6^{4}	3

Qualifying competition
(United States) Jennifer Hopkins	6	6
(Slovakia) Jarmila Gajdošová	4	3

=== Ninth qualifier ===
First round
9	(Germany) Barbara Rittner	6	7^{10}
(Spain) Cristina Torrens Valero	1	6^{8}
WC	(United Kingdom) Alice Mackenzie	1	2
(Canada) Maureen Drake	6	6
(Ukraine) Elena Tatarkova	6	6
(Ukraine) Mariya Koryttseva	2	1
(France) Stéphanie Foretz	6	6
24	(Czech Republic) Lenka Němečková	0	4

Second round
9	(Germany) Barbara Rittner	6	6
(Canada) Maureen Drake	2	4
(Ukraine) Elena Tatarkova	4	5
(France) Stéphanie Foretz	6	7

Qualifying competition
9	(Germany) Barbara Rittner	5	2
(France) Stéphanie Foretz	7	6

=== Tenth qualifier ===
First round
10	(Ukraine) Yuliya Beygelzimer	6	6
(Japan) Aiko Nakamura	4	4
(Tunisia) Selima Sfar	6	6
(Croatia) Darija Jurak	3	4
(Belarus) Anastasiya Yakimova	2	1
(Italy) Antonella Serra Zanetti	6	6
(Slovakia) Eva Fislová	6	6
16	(Spain) Conchita Martínez Granados	2	4

Second round
10	(Ukraine) Yuliya Beygelzimer	7	6
(Tunisia) Selima Sfar	5	4
(Italy) Antonella Serra Zanetti	6	6
(Slovakia) Eva Fislová	3	2

Qualifying competition
10	(Ukraine) Yuliya Beygelzimer	6	6
(Italy) Antonella Serra Zanetti	3	1

=== Eleventh qualifier ===
First round
11	(Germany) Stephanie Gehrlein	6^{4}	0
(Croatia) Ivana Abramović	7^{7}	6
(Romania) Edina Gallovits	7	7^{7}
(Bulgaria) Lubomira Bacheva	5	6^{5}
(China) Yan Zi	4	6	0
(South Korea) Jeon Mi-ra	6	2	6
(Germany) Sandra Klösel	3	4
19	(Germany) Julia Schruff	6	6

Second round
(Croatia) Ivana Abramović	3	0
(Romania) Edina Gallovits	6	6
(South Korea) Jeon Mi-ra	0	7^{7}	6
19	(Germany) Julia Schruff	6	6^{4}	3

Qualifying competition
(Romania) Edina Gallovits	6	4	8
(South Korea) Jeon Mi-ra	1	6	6

=== Twelfth qualifier ===
First round
12	(France) Virginie Pichet	3^{r}
(Australia) Christina Wheeler	3
(Russia) Anastasia Rodionova	6^{5}	2
(Netherlands) Elise Tamaëla	7^{7}	6
WC	(Belgium) Kirsten Flipkens	6	6
(Italy) Nathalie Viérin	0	4
WC	(United Kingdom) Helen Fritche	0	2
23	(Israel) Tzipora Obziler	6	6

Second round
(Australia) Christina Wheeler	4	6	6
(Netherlands) Elise Tamaëla	6	4	3
WC	(Belgium) Kirsten Flipkens	6	0	2
23	(Israel) Tzipora Obziler	2	6	6

Qualifying competition
(Australia) Christina Wheeler	6	6
23	(Israel) Tzipora Obziler	4	3
