= Mark Hilton (tennis) =

British tennis player (born 1981)

- Country (sports): (United Kingdom) Great Britain
- Born: 20 April 1981 (age 44) Chester, England
- Height: 5 ft 7 in (1.70 m)
- Turned pro: 2000
- Plays: Left-handed (two-handed backhand)
- Prize money: $173,449

Singles
- Career record: 1–4
- Career titles: 0
- Highest ranking: No. 202 (20 June 2005)

Grand Slam singles results
- Wimbledon: 2R (2004)
- US Open: Q1 (2005)

Doubles
- Career record: 1–8
- Career titles: 0
- Highest ranking: No. 160 (8 August 2005)

Grand Slam doubles results
- Wimbledon: 2R (2005)

Mark Hilton (born 20 April 1981) is a tennis coach and former professional tennis player from Chester, England.

== Career ==
As a junior, Hilton won the national championships at U16 and U18 level. Hilton's highest world ranking was 62 ITF. Hilton made the semi-finals of the boys' doubles event at the 1999 Wimbledon Championships. He and partner James Nelson lost narrowly 15–17 to Guillermo Coria and David Nalbandian in the final set of their semi-final.

Hilton upset Albert Costa at the 2004 Wimbledon Championships, to make the second round, where he lost to Dominik Hrbatý. In the men's doubles, with Jonathan Marray in 2005 they defeated the French pairing of Julien Benneteau and Nicolas Mahut. They then lost in the second round to Ivo Karlović and Rogier Wassen.

Hilton made 2 ATP Singles Challenger finals. He won three ATP Challenger doubles titles in 2005, with Marray. His final professional tennis match was in November 2005.

In 2005, at the age of 24, Hilton decided to retire. With a singles career high ranking of 202 in June 2005, he had ambitions to be a tennis coach on the ATP Tour.

Hilton began coaching in 2006, completing his coaching qualifications and working with junior players, Daniel Evans, George Morgan and Luke Bambridge. In 2011, Hilton began work as Liam Broady's coach. He became employed by the Lawn Tennis Association (LTA) in 2012 when Broady joined the Lawn Tennis Association against his father's wishes, and the Broadys did not speak to each other for several years. In October 2015, Hilton and Broady agreed to end their coaching relationship.

During Hilton's coaching, Liam Broady reached a junior career high ranking of number 2 in the world in March 2012. Liam Broady made the final of junior Wimbledon in 2011 and the final of the US Open juniors in 2012. Liam Broady won the Australian Open junior doubles title in 2012 with Joshua Ward Hibbert. Liam reached a career high senior ranking of 158 ATP in August 2015.

In November 2015 Hilton started coaching Dan Evans.

Evans subsequently broke in to the top 100 in the ATP rankings in May 2016. Daniel Evans made the 3rd round of Wimbledon and the US Open in 2016. Evans began 2017 making his first ATP final in Sydney, before losing in the last 16 of the Australian Open. Daniel Evans reached a career high ranking of 41 in the world in March 2017.

In July 2017 Hilton started coaching Kyle Edmund.

== Challenger titles ==
=== Doubles: (3) ===
No.	Year	Tournament	Surface	Partner	Opponents in the final	Score in the final
1.	2005	Wrexham, Great Britain	Hard	(United Kingdom) Jonathan Marray	(Finland) Tuomas Ketola (Denmark) Frederik Nielsen	6–3, 6–2
2.	2005	Nottingham, Great Britain	Hard	(United Kingdom) Jonathan Marray	(India) Mustafa Ghouse (India) Harsh Mankad	6–4, 3–6, 6–3
3.	2005	Manchester, Great Britain	Grass	(United Kingdom) Jonathan Marray	(United Kingdom) James Auckland (United Kingdom) Dan Kiernan	6–3, 6–2
