= Miles Kasiri =

British tennis player

- Country (sports): United Kingdom
- Born: 29 January 1987 (age 38)
- Plays: Right -handed
- Prize money: $18,712

Singles
- Career record: 0–0
- Career titles: 0
- Highest ranking: No. 504 (7 April 2008)

Doubles
- Career record: 0–0
- Career titles: 0
- Highest ranking: No. 564 (1 August 2005)
- Last updated on: 16 October 2021.

Miles Kasiri (born 29 January 1987) is a retired British professional tennis player and advocate of plant-based nutrition.

== Career ==
Kasiri is a former student of the Nick Bollettieri Tennis Academy, where he reached the Boys' Singles Final of the 2004 Wimbledon Championships. He was defeated by Gaël Monfils 7–5, 7–6(8-6).

In 2005, Kasiri was suspended by the Lawn Tennis Association's national training for three-months for demonstrating behavioural problems and lack of effort.

== Plant-based nutrition ==
Kasiri became a vegan in 2016 and operates the YouTube channel Healthy Crazy Cool to share nutritional advice and plant-based recipes. He is a registered nutritional therapist.

== Junior Grand Slam finals ==
=== Singles: 1 (1 runner-up) ===
Result	Year	Tournament	Surface	Opponent	Score
Loss	2004	Wimbledon	Grass	(France) Gael Monfils	5–7, 6–7^{(6–8)}

== ATP Challenger and ITF Futures finals ==
=== Singles: 2 (0–2) ===
Legend ATP Challenger (0–0) ITF Futures (0–2)	Finals by surface Hard (0–2) Clay (0–0) Grass (0–0) Carpet (0–0)

Result	W–L	Date	Tournament	Tier	Surface	Opponent	Score
Loss	0–1	May 2007	Greece F1, Kos	Futures	Hard	(Kazakhstan) Syrym Abdukhalikov	4–6, 2–6
Loss	0–2	May 2007	Greece F2, Syros	Futures	Hard	(United Kingdom) Lee Childs	0–2 ret.

=== Doubles: 2 (0–2) ===
Legend ATP Challenger (0–0) ITF Futures (0–2)	Finals by surface Hard (0–2) Clay (0–0) Grass (0–0) Carpet (0–0)

Result	W–L	Date	Tournament	Tier	Surface	Partner	Opponents	Score
Loss	0–1	Aug 2004	Great Britain F3, Wrexham	Futures	Hard	(United Kingdom) Josh Goodall	(United Kingdom) Ken Skupski (United Kingdom) Richard Bloomfield	2–6, 4–6
Loss	0–2	Oct 2004	Great Britain F7, Sunderland	Futures	Hard	(United Kingdom) Josh Goodall	(United Kingdom) Daniel Kiernan (United Kingdom) David Sherwood	4–6, 4–6
