= 2004 Wimbledon Championships =

- Date: 21 June – 4 July
- Edition: 118th
- Category: Grand Slam (ITF)
- Draw: 128S/64D/48XD
- Prize money: £9,707,280
- Surface: Grass
- Location: Church Road; SW19, Wimbledon, London, United Kingdom
- Venue: All England Lawn Tennis and Croquet Club

Champions

Men's singles
- (Switzerland) Roger Federer

Women's singles
- (Russia) Maria Sharapova

Men's doubles
- (Sweden) Jonas Björkman / (Australia) Todd Woodbridge

Women's doubles
- (Zimbabwe) Cara Black / (Australia) Rennae Stubbs

Mixed doubles
- (Zimbabwe) Wayne Black / (Zimbabwe) Cara Black

Boys' singles
- (France) Gaël Monfils

Girls' singles
- (Ukraine) Kateryna Bondarenko

Boys' doubles
- (United States) Brendan Evans / (United States) Scott Oudsema

Girls' doubles
- (Belarus) Victoria Azarenka / (Belarus) Olga Govortsova
- Wimbledon Championships

The 2004 Wimbledon Championships was a tennis tournament played on grass courts at the All England Lawn Tennis and Croquet Club in Wimbledon, London in the United Kingdom. It was the 118th edition of the Wimbledon Championships and were held from 21 June to 4 July 2004. It was the third Grand Slam tennis event of the year.

Roger Federer was successful in his title defence, defeating Andy Roddick in the final to win his second Wimbledon title. Two-time defending champion Serena Williams was unsuccessful in her title defence, being upset in the final by then little-known 17-year-old Russian Maria Sharapova; Sharapova became the first Russian player, male or female, to win Wimbledon, the second-youngest player to win Wimbledon in the Modern Era and third-youngest overall.

In the juniors, Gaël Monfils won his third consecutive Grand Slam title in the boys' competition, and Kateryna Bondarenko won the girls' title.

For only the third time in history (after 1991 and 1997), play was required on the Middle Sunday due to persistent rain delays during the first week of these championships.

== Point and prize money distribution ==
=== Point distribution ===
Below are the tables with the point distribution for each discipline of the tournament.

==== Senior points ====
Event	W	F	SF	QF	Round of 16	Round of 32	Round of 64	Round of 128	Q	Q3	Q2	Q1
Men's singles	1000	700	450	250	150	75	35	5	12	8	4	0
Men's doubles	1000	700	450	250	150	75	0	—N/a	12	—N/a	0	0
Women's singles	650	456	292	162	90	56	32	2	30	21	12.5	4
Women's doubles	650	456	292	162	90	56	0	—N/a	30	—N/a	0	0

=== Prize distribution ===
The total prize money for 2004 championships was £9,707,280. The winner of the men's title earned £602,500 while the women's singles champion earned £560,500.

Event	W	F	SF	QF	Round of 16	Round of 32	Round of 64	Round of 128
Men's singles	£602,500							
Women's singles	£560,500							
Men's doubles *	£215,000							—N/a
Women's doubles *	£200,000							—N/a
Mixed doubles *	£90,000							—N/a

_{* per team}

== Champions ==
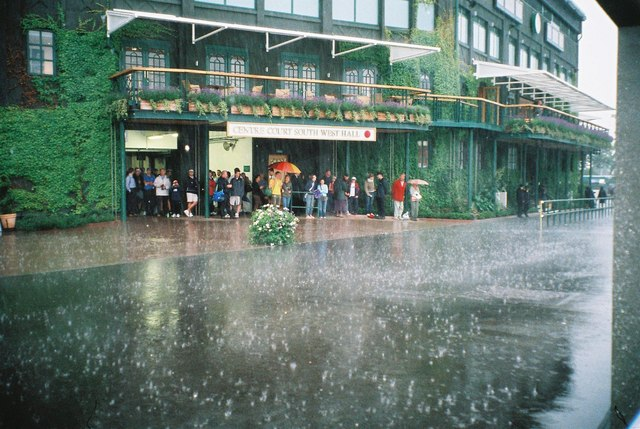
People's Sunday, 2004

=== Seniors ===
==== Men's singles ====
(Switzerland) Roger Federer defeated (United States) Andy Roddick, 4–6, 7–5, 7–6^{(7–3)}, 6–4

- It was Federer's sixth title of the year, and his 17th overall. It was his third career Grand Slam title, and his 2nd at Wimbledon.

==== Women's singles ====
(Russia) Maria Sharapova defeated (United States) Serena Williams, 6–1, 6–4

- It was Sharapova's second title of the year, and her fourth overall. It was her first career Grand Slam title.

==== Men's doubles ====
(Sweden) Jonas Björkman / (Australia) Todd Woodbridge defeated (Austria) Julian Knowle / (Serbia and Montenegro) Nenad Zimonjić, 6–1, 6–4, 4–6, 6–4

==== Women's doubles ====
(Zimbabwe) Cara Black / (Australia) Rennae Stubbs defeated (South Africa) Liezel Huber / (Japan) Ai Sugiyama, 6–3, 7–6^{(7-5)}

==== Mixed doubles ====
(Zimbabwe) Wayne Black / (Zimbabwe) Cara Black defeated (Australia) Todd Woodbridge / (Australia) Alicia Molik, 3–6, 7–6^{(10-8)}, 6–4

=== Juniors ===
==== Boys' singles ====
(France) Gaël Monfils defeated (United Kingdom) Miles Kasiri, 7–5, 7–6^{(8-6)}

==== Girls' singles ====
(Ukraine) Kateryna Bondarenko defeated (Serbia and Montenegro) Ana Ivanovic, 6–4, 6–7^{(2-7)}, 6–3

==== Boys' doubles ====
(United States) Brendan Evans / (United States) Scott Oudsema defeated (Netherlands) Robin Haase / (Serbia and Montenegro) Viktor Troicki, 6–4, 6–4

==== Girls' doubles ====
(Belarus) Victoria Azarenka / (Belarus) Olga Govortsova defeated (New Zealand) Marina Erakovic / (Romania) Monica Niculescu, 6–4, 3–6, 6–4

== Singles seeds ==
=== Men's singles ===
1. (Switzerland) Roger Federer (champion)
2. (United States) Andy Roddick (final, lost to Roger Federer)
3. (Argentina) Guillermo Coria (second round, lost to Florian Mayer)
4. (Argentina) David Nalbandian (withdrew)
5. (United Kingdom) Tim Henman (quarterfinals, lost to Mario Ančić)
6. (Spain) Juan Carlos Ferrero (third round, lost to Robby Ginepri)
7. (Australia) Lleyton Hewitt (quarterfinals, lost to Roger Federer)
8. (Germany) Rainer Schüttler (third round, lost to Vince Spadea)
9. (Spain) Carlos Moyá (fourth round, lost to Lleyton Hewitt)
10. (France) Sébastien Grosjean (semifinals, lost to Roger Federer)
11. (Australia) Mark Philippoussis (fourth round, lost to Tim Henman)
12. (Netherlands) Sjeng Schalken (quarterfinals, lost to Andy Roddick)
13. (Thailand) Paradorn Srichaphan (first round, lost to Ivo Karlović)
14. (United States) Mardy Fish (second round, lost to Joachim Johansson)
15. (Chile) Nicolás Massú (first round, lost to Alexander Popp)
16. (Czech Republic) Jiří Novák (first round, lost to Xavier Malisse)
17. (Sweden) Jonas Björkman (third round, lost to Joachim Johansson)
18. (Spain) Feliciano López (third round, lost to Ivo Karlović)
19. (Russia) Marat Safin (first round, lost to Dmitry Tursunov)
20. (Spain) Tommy Robredo (second round, lost to Karol Beck)
21. (Argentina) Juan Ignacio Chela (second round, lost to Thomas Enqvist)
22. (Romania) Andrei Pavel (second round, lost to Kenneth Carlsen)
23. (Belarus) Max Mirnyi (first round, lost to Jan-Michael Gambill)
24. (Chile) Fernando González (third round, lost to Mark Philippoussis)
25. (Slovakia) Dominik Hrbatý (third round, lost to Mario Ančić)
26. (United States) Taylor Dent (third round, lost to Andy Roddick)
27. (United States) Robby Ginepri (fourth round, lost to Sébastien Grosjean)
28. (Croatia) Ivan Ljubičić (first round, lost to Wayne Ferreira)
29. (Germany) Nicolas Kiefer (first round, lost to Thomas Johansson)
30. (United States) Vince Spadea (fourth round, lost to Sjeng Schalken)
31. (Russia) Mikhail Youzhny (first round, lost to Goran Ivanišević)
32. (Morocco) Hicham Arazi (third round, lost to Tim Henman)
33. (Peru) Luis Horna (first round, lost to Mario Ančić)

=== Women's singles ===
1. (United States) Serena Williams (final, lost to Maria Sharapova)
2. (Russia) Anastasia Myskina (third round, lost to Amy Frazier)
3. (United States) Venus Williams (second round, lost to Karolina Šprem)
4. (France) Amélie Mauresmo (semifinals, lost to Serena Williams)
5. (United States) Lindsay Davenport (semifinals, lost to Maria Sharapova)
6. (Russia) Elena Dementieva (first round, lost to Sandra Kleinová)
7. (United States) Jennifer Capriati (quarterfinals, lost to Serena Williams)
8. (Russia) Svetlana Kuznetsova (first round, lost to Virginie Razzano)
9. (Argentina) Paola Suárez (quarterfinals, lost to Amélie Mauresmo)
10. (Russia) Nadia Petrova (fourth round, lost to Jennifer Capriati)
11. (Japan) Ai Sugiyama (quarterfinals, lost to Maria Sharapova)
12. (Russia) Vera Zvonareva (fourth round, lost to Lindsay Davenport)
13. (Russia) Maria Sharapova (champion)
14. (Italy) Silvia Farina Elia (fourth round, lost to Amélie Mauresmo)
15. (Switzerland) Patty Schnyder (second round, lost to Emmanuelle Gagliardi)
16. (Israel) Anna Smashnova-Pistolesi (first round, lost to Katarina Srebotnik)
17. (United States) Chanda Rubin (first round, lost to Marion Bartoli)
18. (Italy) Francesca Schiavone (second round, lost to Tatiana Golovin)
19. (Colombia) Fabiola Zuluaga (first round, lost to Anne Kremer)
20. (Russia) Elena Bovina (second round, lost to Daniela Hantuchová)
21. (Bulgaria) Magdalena Maleeva (fourth round, lost to Karolina Šprem)
22. (Spain) Conchita Martínez (first round, lost to Milagros Sequera)
23. (Serbia and Montenegro) Jelena Dokić (first round, lost to Gisela Dulko)
24. (France) Mary Pierce (first round, lost to Virginia Ruano Pascual)
25. (France) Nathalie Dechy (third round, lost to Jennifer Capriati)
26. (United States) Lisa Raymond (second round, lost to Ľudmila Cervanová)
27. (Australia) Alicia Molik (third round, lost to Tamarine Tanasugarn)
28. (France) Émilie Loit (first round, lost to Tatiana Panova)
29. (Russia) Dinara Safina (first round, lost to Arantxa Parra Santonja)
30. (Greece) Eleni Daniilidou (first round, lost to Magüi Serna)
31. (United States) Amy Frazier (fourth round, lost to Maria Sharapova)
32. (United States) Meghann Shaughnessy (third round, lost to Karolina Šprem)

== Main draw wild card entries ==
The following players received wild cards into the main draw senior events.

Men's singles

1. (United Kingdom) Richard Bloomfield
2. (United Kingdom) Alex Bogdanovic
3. (United Kingdom) Lee Childs
4. (United Kingdom) Mark Hilton
5. (Croatia) Goran Ivanišević
6. (United Kingdom) Jonathan Marray
7. (United Kingdom) Arvind Parmar
8. (United Kingdom) Greg Rusedski

Women's singles

1. (United Kingdom) Elena Baltacha
2. (United Kingdom) Amanda Janes
3. (United Kingdom) Anne Keothavong
4. (United States) Martina Navratilova
5. (United Kingdom) Katie O'Brien
6. (United Kingdom) Jane O'Donoghue
7. (Switzerland) Patty Schnyder
8. (United Kingdom) Emily Webley-Smith

Men's doubles

1. (United Kingdom) James Auckland / (United Kingdom) Lee Childs
2. (United Kingdom) Andrew Banks / (United Kingdom) Alex Bogdanovic
3. (United Kingdom) Jamie Delgado / (United Kingdom) Arvind Parmar
4. (United Kingdom) Ian Flanagan / (United Kingdom) Martin Lee
5. (United Kingdom) Mark Hilton / (United Kingdom) Jonathan Marray
6. (United Kingdom) Dan Kiernan / (United Kingdom) David Sherwood

Women's doubles

1. (United Kingdom) Elena Baltacha / (United Kingdom) Amanda Janes
2. (United Kingdom) Sarah Borwell / (United Kingdom) Emily Webley-Smith
3. (United Kingdom) Hannah Collin / (United Kingdom) Anne Keothavong
4. (United Kingdom) Helen Crook / (United Kingdom) Anna Hawkins
5. (France) Tatiana Golovin / (France) Mary Pierce
6. (Spain) Anabel Medina Garrigues / (Spain) Arantxa Sánchez Vicario

Mixed doubles

1. (United Kingdom) Jonathan Marray / (United Kingdom) Amanda Janes
2. (United States) Jared Palmer / (Spain) Arantxa Sánchez Vicario
3. (United Kingdom) Arvind Parmar / (United Kingdom) Jane O'Donoghue
4. (Israel) Andy Ram / (Russia) Anastasia Rodionova
5. (United Kingdom) David Sherwood / (United Kingdom) Anne Keothavong

== Protected ranking ==
=== Men's singles ===
- (Germany) Tommy Haas
- (Sweden) Thomas Johansson
- (Denmark) Kristian Pless
- (Czech Republic) Bohdan Ulihrach

=== Women's singles ===
- (Luxembourg) Anne Kremer

== Qualifier entries ==
=== Men's singles ===
1. (United Kingdom) Jamie Delgado
2. (Brazil) André Sá
3. (Spain) Iván Navarro
4. (France) Richard Gasquet
5. (Paraguay) Ramón Delgado
6. (United States) Glenn Weiner
7. (Czech Republic) Jan Hernych
8. (Belgium) Christophe Rochus
9. (Colombia) Alejandro Falla
10. (Switzerland) Ivo Heuberger
11. (Italy) Daniele Bracciali
12. (Chinese Taipei) Wang Yeu-tzuoo
13. (France) Olivier Patience
14. (Austria) Julian Knowle
15. (Israel) Andy Ram
16. (Serbia and Montenegro) Janko Tipsarević

The following players received entry into the lucky loser spot:

1. (France) Julien Benneteau
2. (Italy) Davide Sanguinetti
3. (Austria) Alexander Peya
4. (Italy) Potito Starace
5. (Italy) Stefano Pescosolido

=== Women's singles ===
1. (Spain) Nuria Llagostera Vives
2. (Indonesia) Angelique Widjaja
3. (Russia) Tatiana Panova
4. (China) Sun Tiantian
5. (United States) Mashona Washington
6. (Czech Republic) Eva Birnerová
7. (France) Virginie Razzano
8. (United States) Jennifer Hopkins
9. (France) Stéphanie Foretz
10. (Ukraine) Yuliya Beygelzimer
11. (Romania) Edina Gallovits
12. (Australia) Christina Wheeler

=== Men's doubles ===
1. (Australia) Stephen Huss / (Sweden) Robert Lindstedt
2. (Hungary) Gergely Kisgyörgy / (Poland) Łukasz Kubot
3. (South Africa) Rik de Voest / (Australia) Nathan Healey
4. (Italy) Daniele Bracciali / (Italy) Giorgio Galimberti

The following teams received entry into the lucky loser spot:

1. (United States) Devin Bowen / (United States) Tripp Phillips
2. (United States) Diego Ayala / (United States) Brian Vahaly
3. (Denmark) Kenneth Carlsen / (Finland) Tuomas Ketola

=== Women's doubles ===
1. (New Zealand) Leanne Baker / (Australia) Nicole Sewell
2. (South Korea) Jeon Mi-ra / (Japan) Yuka Yoshida
3. (Bulgaria) Lubomira Bacheva / (Czech Republic) Eva Birnerová
4. (Australia) Evie Dominikovic / (Russia) Anastasia Rodionova

The following teams received entry into the lucky loser spot:

1. (Austria) Barbara Schwartz / (Germany) Jasmin Wöhr
2. (United States) Amanda Augustus / (South Africa) Natalie Grandin
3. (Republic of Ireland) Claire Curran / (United Kingdom) Jane O'Donoghue

Preceded by 2004 French Open	Grand Slams	Succeeded by 2004 US Open
