= Elizabeth Kobak =

American tennis player

- Country (sports): United States
- Born: June 3, 1988 (age 37) New York City, U.S.
- Height: 5 ft 5 in (165 cm)
- Plays: Right-handed
- Prize money: $10,230

Singles
- Career record: 20–40
- Highest ranking: No. 570 (October 2, 2006)

Doubles
- Career record: 5–16
- Highest ranking: No. 665 (October 30, 2006)

Elizabeth Kobak (born June 3, 1988) is an American former professional tennis player.

Kobak grew up on Long Island, as the youngest of two children. She was the USTA Girls' 16s national hardcourt champion in 2003 and made a WTA Tour main draw appearance at the Forest Hills Tennis Classic in 2004, losing her first round match to fourth-seed Iveta Benešová. Her career best rankings were 570 in singles and 665 in doubles.
