= 2004 Wimbledon Championships – Men's doubles =

Men's doubles
- 2004 Wimbledon Championships

Final
- Champions: (Sweden) Jonas Björkman (Australia) Todd Woodbridge
- Runners-up: (Austria) Julian Knowle (Serbia and Montenegro) Nenad Zimonjić
- Score: 6–1, 6–4, 4–6, 6–4

Details
- Draw: 64 (4 Q / 6 WC )
- Seeds: 16

Events
Singles	men	women		boys	girls
Doubles	men	women	mixed	boys	girls
WC Singles	men	women	quad
WC Doubles	men	women	quad
Legends	men	women	seniors
← 2003 ·	Wimbledon Championships	· 2005 →

Jonas Björkman and Todd Woodbridge successfully defended their title for a second year in a row, defeating Julian Knowle and Nenad Zimonjić in the final, 6–1, 6–4, 4–6, 6–4, to win the gentlemen's doubles title at the 2004 Wimbledon Championships With the title Woodbridge broke Laurence and Reginald Doherty's record of eight Wimbledon men's doubles titles.

== Seeds ==
1. (Sweden) Jonas Björkman / (Australia) Todd Woodbridge (champions)
2. (United States) Bob Bryan / (United States) Mike Bryan (third round)
3. (India) Mahesh Bhupathi / (Belarus) Max Mirnyi (third round)
4. (France) Michaël Llodra / (France) Fabrice Santoro (withdrew)
5. (The Bahamas) Mark Knowles / (Canada) Daniel Nestor (semifinals)
6. (Zimbabwe) Wayne Black / (Zimbabwe) Kevin Ullyett (quarterfinals)
7. (Australia) Wayne Arthurs / (Australia) Paul Hanley (semifinals)
8. (Czech Republic) Martin Damm / (Czech Republic) Cyril Suk (third round)
9. (Argentina) Gastón Etlis / (Argentina) Martín Rodríguez (second round)
10. (Israel) Jonathan Erlich / (Israel) Andy Ram (first round)
11. (India) Leander Paes / (Czech Republic) David Rikl (second round)
12. (United States) Jared Palmer / (Czech Republic) Pavel Vízner (third round)
13. (Czech Republic) František Čermák / (Czech Republic) Leoš Friedl (first round)
14. (Belgium) Xavier Malisse / (Belgium) Olivier Rochus (second round, retired)
15. (Argentina) Mariano Hood / (Argentina) Sebastián Prieto (second round)
16. (Austria) Julian Knowle / (Serbia and Montenegro) Nenad Zimonjić (final)

Click on the seed number of a player to go to their draw section.

== Draw ==
=== Key ===
- Q = Qualifier
- WC = Wild card
- LL = Lucky loser
- Alt = Alternate
- ITF = ITF entry
- PR = Protected ranking
- SR = Special ranking
- SE = Special exempt
- JE = Junior exempt
- JR = Junior Accelerator Programme entrant
- CO = College Accelerator Programme entrant
- NG = Next Gen Accelerator Program entrant
- w/o = Walkover
- r = Retired
- d = Defaulted

=== Finals ===
Quarterfinals
1	(Sweden) Jonas Björkman (Australia) Todd Woodbridge	7	6
(Russia) Nikolay Davydenko (Australia) Ashley Fisher	5	2
(Sweden) Simon Aspelin (Australia) Todd Perry	3	6^{3}
7	(Australia) Wayne Arthurs (Australia) Paul Hanley	6	7^{7}
6	(Zimbabwe) Wayne Black (Zimbabwe) Kevin Ullyett	5	6	4
16	(Austria) Julian Knowle (Serbia and Montenegro) Nenad Zimonjić	7	4	6
5	(The Bahamas) Mark Knowles (Canada) Daniel Nestor	6	6
(United States) Justin Gimelstob (United States) Scott Humphries	3	2

Semifinals
1	(Sweden) Jonas Björkman (Australia) Todd Woodbridge	7	7	7^{7}
7	(Australia) Wayne Arthurs (Australia) Paul Hanley	5	5	6^{4}
16	(Austria) Julian Knowle (Serbia and Montenegro) Nenad Zimonjić	6	3	6	6^{7}	6
5	(The Bahamas) Mark Knowles (Canada) Daniel Nestor	2	6	3	7^{9}	3

Final
1	(Sweden) Jonas Björkman (Australia) Todd Woodbridge	6	6	4	6
16	(Austria) Julian Knowle (Serbia and Montenegro) Nenad Zimonjić	1	4	6	4

=== Top half ===
==== Section 1 ====
First round
1	(Sweden) J Björkman (Australia) T Woodbridge	6	6
(Spain) A Martín (Spain) A Montañés	1	2
(Argentina) L Arnold Ker (Argentina) M García	7^{7}	7^{7}
(South Africa) J Coetzee (South Africa) C Haggard	6^{3}	6^{4}
(United States) R Leach (United States) B MacPhie	7^{7}	6
Q	(South Africa) R de Voest (Australia) N Healey	6^{4}	4
(Czech Republic) T Cibulec (Czech Republic) P Pála	1	6^{2}
14	(Belgium) X Malisse (Belgium) O Rochus	6	7^{7}
9	(Argentina) G Etlis (Argentina) M Rodríguez	6	6
WC	(United Kingdom) J Auckland (United Kingdom) L Childs	4	3
(Spain) D Ferrer (Spain) R Ramírez Hidalgo	2	1
(Russia) N Davydenko (Australia) A Fisher	6	6
LL	(United States) D Bowen (United States) T Phillips	6	6^{5}	5
WC	(United Kingdom) I Flanagan (United Kingdom) M Lee	3	7^{7}	7
(Germany) K Braasch (Germany) R Schüttler	0	4
8	(Czech Republic) M Damm (Czech Republic) C Suk	6	6

Second round
1	(Sweden) J Björkman (Australia) T Woodbridge	6	6
(Argentina) L Arnold Ker (Argentina) M García	3	2
(United States) R Leach (United States) B MacPhie	6^{3}	7	4
14	(Belgium) X Malisse (Belgium) O Rochus	7^{7}	5	5^{r}
9	(Argentina) G Etlis (Argentina) M Rodríguez	5	6^{2}
(Russia) N Davydenko (Australia) A Fisher	7	7^{7}
WC	(United Kingdom) I Flanagan (United Kingdom) M Lee	6^{4}	6^{5}
8	(Czech Republic) M Damm (Czech Republic) C Suk	7^{7}	7^{7}

Third round
1	(Sweden) J Björkman (Australia) T Woodbridge	3	6	9
(United States) R Leach (United States) B MacPhie	6	4	7
(Russia) N Davydenko (Australia) A Fisher	6^{4}	7^{8}	15
8	(Czech Republic) M Damm (Czech Republic) C Suk	7^{7}	6^{6}	13

Quarterfinals
1	(Sweden) J Björkman (Australia) T Woodbridge	7	6
(Russia) N Davydenko (Australia) A Fisher	5	2

==== Section 2 ====
First round
LL	(United States) D Ayala (United States) B Vahaly	6	1	5
(Spain) Á López Morón (Czech Republic) D Škoch	1	6	7
(Czech Republic) J Levinský (Italy) F Volandri	2	2
(Sweden) S Aspelin (Australia) T Perry	6	6
(Germany) F Mayer (Netherlands) R Wassen	3	4
(France) J-F Bachelot (Romania) A Pavel	6	6
(Australia) J Kerr (Belgium) T Vanhoudt	6^{4}	2
15	(Argentina) M Hood (Argentina) S Prieto	7^{7}	6
10	(Israel) J Erlich (Israel) A Ram	4	6^{4}
(Czech Republic) J Novák (Czech Republic) R Štěpánek	6	7^{7}
(Armenia) S Sargsian (Russia) M Youzhny	3	4
Q	(Australia) S Huss (Sweden) R Lindstedt	6	6
LL	(Denmark) K Carlsen (Finland) T Ketola	3	4
(Spain) F López (Spain) F Verdasco	6	6
WC	(United Kingdom) A Banks (United Kingdom) A Bogdanovic	6^{4}	2
7	(Australia) W Arthurs (Australia) P Hanley	7^{7}	6

Second round
(Spain) Á López Morón (Czech Republic) D Škoch	3	7^{7}	6
(Sweden) S Aspelin (Australia) T Perry	6	6^{5}	8
(France) J-F Bachelot (Romania) A Pavel	6	7^{9}
15	(Argentina) M Hood (Argentina) S Prieto	2	6^{7}
(Czech Republic) J Novák (Czech Republic) R Štěpánek	6	3	6
Q	(Australia) S Huss (Sweden) R Lindstedt	4	6	3
(Spain) F López (Spain) F Verdasco	6^{2}	4
7	(Australia) W Arthurs (Australia) P Hanley	7^{7}	6

Third round
(Sweden) S Aspelin (Australia) T Perry	6	6
(France) J-F Bachelot (Romania) A Pavel	4	2
(Czech Republic) J Novák (Czech Republic) R Štěpánek	6^{4}	4
7	(Australia) W Arthurs (Australia) P Hanley	7^{7}	6

Quarterfinals
(Sweden) S Aspelin (Australia) T Perry	3	6^{3}
7	(Australia) W Arthurs (Australia) P Hanley	6	7^{7}

=== Bottom half ===
==== Section 3 ====
First round
6	(Zimbabwe) W Black (Zimbabwe) K Ullyett	6	6
(Argentina) F Browne (Argentina) G Coria	3	2
(Brazil) A Sá (Brazil) F Saretta	3	7^{7}	12
(Croatia) I Karlović (United States) J Thomas	6	6^{2}	10
(France) J Benneteau (France) N Mahut	4	7^{7}	17
(Spain) F Mantilla (Chile) N Massú	6	6^{4}	15
(United States) J-M Gambill (Australia) M Hill	2	4
12	(United States) J Palmer (Czech Republic) P Vízner	6	6
16	(Austria) J Knowle (Serbia and Montenegro) N Zimonjić	6	6
(Switzerland) Y Allegro (Germany) M Kohlmann	4	4
(Poland) M Fyrstenberg (Poland) M Matkowski	6	6
(Russia) I Andreev (Spain) D Sánchez	1	2
(Netherlands) R Sluiter (Netherlands) M Verkerk	6	6^{8}	6
(Spain) JI Carrasco (Spain) T Robredo	3	7^{10}	3
(Morocco) H Arazi (Australia) J Eagle	3	4
3	(India) M Bhupathi (Belarus) M Mirnyi	6	6

Second round
6	(Zimbabwe) W Black (Zimbabwe) K Ullyett	4	6	6
(Brazil) A Sá (Brazil) F Saretta	6	3	4
(France) J Benneteau (France) N Mahut	4	3
12	(United States) J Palmer (Czech Republic) P Vízner	6	6
16	(Austria) J Knowle (Serbia and Montenegro) N Zimonjić	7^{8}	7^{7}
(Poland) M Fyrstenberg (Poland) M Matkowski	6^{6}	6^{3}
(Netherlands) R Sluiter (Netherlands) M Verkerk	5	3
3	(India) M Bhupathi (Belarus) M Mirnyi	7	6

Third round
6	(Zimbabwe) W Black (Zimbabwe) K Ullyett	7	6
12	(United States) J Palmer (Czech Republic) P Vízner	5	4
16	(Austria) J Knowle (Serbia and Montenegro) N Zimonjić	6	3	8
3	(India) M Bhupathi (Belarus) M Mirnyi	4	6	6

Quarterfinals
6	(Zimbabwe) W Black (Zimbabwe) K Ullyett	5	6	4
16	(Austria) J Knowle (Serbia and Montenegro) N Zimonjić	7	4	6

==== Section 4 ====
First round
5	(The Bahamas) M Knowles (Canada) D Nestor	6	6
(United States) R Ginepri (The Bahamas) M Merklein	1	3
(Italy) M Bertolini (South Africa) R Koenig	3	4
(Sweden) T Johansson (Sweden) J Landsberg	6	6
(United States) T Parrott (United States) V Spadea	6^{5}	7^{7}	6
WC	(United Kingdom) M Hilton (United Kingdom) J Marray	7^{7}	6^{4}	4
Q	(Italy) D Bracciali (Italy) G Galimberti	5	7^{7}	3
11	(India) L Paes (Czech Republic) D Rikl	7	6^{3}	6
13	(Czech Republic) F Čermák (Czech Republic) L Friedl	6^{3}	4
(United States) J Gimelstob (United States) S Humphries	7^{7}	6
WC	(United Kingdom) D Kiernan (United Kingdom) D Sherwood	6^{6}	4
(Slovakia) D Hrbatý (United States) G Oliver	7^{8}	6
(Argentina) JI Chela (Peru) L Horna	3	6	7
Q	(Hungary) G Kisgyörgy (Poland) Ł Kubot	6	3	9
WC	(United Kingdom) J Delgado (United Kingdom) A Parmar	4	3
2	(United States) B Bryan (United States) M Bryan	6	6

Second round
5	(The Bahamas) M Knowles (Canada) D Nestor	6	6
(Sweden) T Johansson (Sweden) J Landsberg	2	4
(United States) T Parrott (United States) V Spadea	7^{8}	6
11	(India) L Paes (Czech Republic) D Rikl	6^{6}	3
(United States) J Gimelstob (United States) S Humphries	6	6^{1}	6
(Slovakia) D Hrbatý (United States) G Oliver	3	7^{7}	3
Q	(Hungary) G Kisgyörgy (Poland) Ł Kubot	6^{6}	3
2	(United States) B Bryan (United States) M Bryan	7^{8}	6

Third round
5	(The Bahamas) M Knowles (Canada) D Nestor	6	6
(United States) T Parrott (United States) V Spadea	3	2
(United States) J Gimelstob (United States) S Humphries	6	3	6
2	(United States) B Bryan (United States) M Bryan	3	6	4

Quarterfinals
5	(The Bahamas) M Knowles (Canada) D Nestor	6	6
(United States) J Gimelstob (United States) S Humphries	3	2
