= 2004 Wimbledon Championships – Girls' doubles =

Girls' doubles
- 2004 Wimbledon Championships

Final
- Champions: (Belarus) Victoria Azarenka (Belarus) Olga Govortsova
- Runners-up: (New Zealand) Marina Erakovic (Romania) Monica Niculescu
- Score: 6–4, 3–6, 6–4

Events
Singles	men	women		boys	girls
Doubles	men	women	mixed	boys	girls
WC Singles	men	women	quad
WC Doubles	men	women	quad
Legends	men	women	seniors
← 2003 ·	Wimbledon Championships	· 2005 →

Alisa Kleybanova and Sania Mirza were the defending champions, but Mirza did not compete in the Juniors this year. Kleybanova competed with Irina Kotkina but they lost in the quarterfinals to Marina Erakovic and Monica Niculescu.

Victoria Azarenka and Olga Govortsova defeated Erakovic and Niculescu in the final, 6–4, 3–6, 6–4 to win the girls' doubles tennis title at the 2004 Wimbledon Championships.

== Seeds ==
1. (Netherlands) Michaëlla Krajicek / (Israel) Shahar Pe'er (semifinals)
2. (Czech Republic) Veronika Chvojková / (Czech Republic) Nicole Vaidišová (semifinals)
3. (Belarus) Victoria Azarenka / (Belarus) Olga Govortsova (champions)
4. (New Zealand) Marina Erakovic / (Romania) Monica Niculescu (final)
5. (Ukraine) Kateryna Bondarenko / (Romania) Mădălina Gojnea (second round)
6. (Chinese Taipei) Chan Yung-jan / (Canada) Aleksandra Wozniak (quarterfinals)
7. (Russia) Alisa Kleybanova / (Russia) Irina Kotkina (quarterfinals)
8. (Chinese Taipei) Hsu Wen-hsin / (China) Sun Shengnan (first round)

== Draw ==
=== Key ===
- Q = Qualifier
- WC = Wild card
- LL = Lucky loser
- Alt = Alternate
- SE = Special exempt
- PR = Protected ranking
- ITF = ITF entry
- JE = Junior exempt
- w/o = Walkover
- r = Retired
- d = Defaulted
- SR = Special ranking

=== Finals ===
Semifinals
1	(Netherlands) Michaëlla Krajicek (Israel) Shahar Pe'er	6^{3}	2
3	(Belarus) Victoria Azarenka (Belarus) Olga Govortsova	7^{7}	6
4	(New Zealand) Marina Erakovic (Romania) Monica Niculescu	6	7^{9}
2	(Czech Republic) Veronika Chvojková (Czech Republic) Nicole Vaidišová	4	6^{7}

Final
3	(Belarus) Victoria Azarenka (Belarus) Olga Govortsova	6	3	6
4	(New Zealand) Marina Erakovic (Romania) Monica Niculescu	4	6	4

=== Top half ===
First round
1	(Netherlands) Michaëlla Krajicek (Israel) Shahar Pe'er	4	6	9
(Czech Republic) Nikola Fraňková (Hungary) Ágnes Szávay	6	3	7
(Serbia and Montenegro) Teodora Mirčić (France) Irena Pavlovic	6^{4}	6	6
(South Africa) Ghizela Schutte (Romania) Ágnes Szatmári	7^{7}	3	3
(Russia) Ekaterina Kirianova (Serbia and Montenegro) Vojislava Lukić	6	6
(Russia) Evgenia Grebenyuk (Czech Republic) Kateřina Kramperová	2	3
Alt	(China) Liu Wanting (China) Zhang Shuai	1	4
6	(Chinese Taipei) Chan Yung-jan (Canada) Aleksandra Wozniak	6	6
3	(Belarus) Victoria Azarenka (Belarus) Olga Govortsova	6	7
(Ecuador) Estefania Balda Álvarez (Thailand) Pichittra Thongdach	4	5
(Russia) Ekaterina Kosminskaya (Russia) Ekaterina Makarova	0	3
(Germany) Angelique Kerber (Germany) Tatjana Malek	6	6
(Italy) Giulia Gabba (Italy) Verdiana Verardi	6	6
WC	(United Kingdom) Hannah Grady (United Kingdom) Claire Peterzan	2	1
(United States) Yasmin Schnack (United States) Katrina Tsang	4	6	13
8	(Chinese Taipei) Hsu Wen-hsin (China) Sun Shengnan	6	4	11

Second round
1	(Netherlands) M Krajicek (Israel) S Pe'er	6	6
(Serbia and Montenegro) T Mirčić (France) I Pavlovic	3	2
(Russia) E Kirianova (Serbia and Montenegro) V Lukić	1	0
6	(Chinese Taipei) Y-j Chan (Canada) A Wozniak	6	6
3	(Belarus) V Azarenka (Belarus) O Govortsova	6	3	6
(Germany) A Kerber (Germany) T Malek	2	6	4
(Italy) G Gabba (Italy) V Verardi
(United States) Y Schnack (United States) K Tsang	w/o

Quarterfinals
1	(Netherlands) M Krajicek (Israel) S Pe'er	6	6
6	(Chinese Taipei) Y-j Chan (Canada) A Wozniak	2	4
3	(Belarus) V Azarenka (Belarus) O Govortsova	6	6
(Italy) G Gabba (Italy) V Verardi	0	2

Semifinals
1	(Netherlands) M Krajicek (Israel) S Pe'er	6^{3}	2
3	(Belarus) V Azarenka (Belarus) O Govortsova	7^{7}	6

=== Bottom half ===
First round
7	(Russia) Alisa Kleybanova (Russia) Irina Kotkina	6	6
(Slovenia) Maša Zec Peškirič (France) Ana-Maria Zubori	0	3
(Argentina) Betina Jozami (Argentina) Florencia Molinero	6	6
(Australia) Bojana Bobusic (Australia) Sophie Ferguson	3	2
(Japan) Ryōko Fuda (United States) Neha Uberoi	6	6
WC	(United Kingdom) Natasha Khan (United Kingdom) Laura Peterzan	3	0
(Australia) Lara Giltinan (Denmark) Caroline Wozniacki	1	6^{5}
4	(New Zealand) Marina Erakovic (Romania) Monica Niculescu	6	7^{7}
5	(Ukraine) Kateryna Bondarenko (Romania) Mădălina Gojnea	3	6	7
(India) Tara Iyer (United States) Elizabeth Kobak	6	0	5
WC	(United Kingdom) Katie O'Brien (United Kingdom) Melanie South	6	4	6
(Russia) Regina Kulikova (Russia) Evgeniya Rodina	3	6	4
(Japan) Yurika Sema (Netherlands) Nicole Thyssen	6	6
(Slovakia) Jana Juricová (Slovakia) Magdaléna Rybáriková	4	4
WC	(United Kingdom) Jade Curtis (United Kingdom) Lara Fakhoury	1	0
2	(Czech Republic) Veronika Chvojková (Czech Republic) Nicole Vaidišová	6	6

Second round
7	(Russia) A Kleybanova (Russia) I Kotkina	6	6
(Argentina) B Jozami (Argentina) F Molinero	1	1
(Japan) R Fuda (United States) N Uberoi	6	6^{2}	4
4	(New Zealand) M Erakovic (Romania) M Niculescu	3	7^{7}	6
5	(Ukraine) K Bondarenko (Romania) M Gojnea	6^{3}	3
WC	(United Kingdom) K O'Brien (United Kingdom) M South	7^{7}	6
(Japan) Y Sema (Netherlands) N Thyssen	7^{7}	4	5
2	(Czech Republic) V Chvojková (Czech Republic) N Vaidišová	6^{4}	6	7

Quarterfinals
7	(Russia) A Kleybanova (Russia) I Kotkina	2	7^{7}	0
4	(New Zealand) M Erakovic (Romania) M Niculescu	6	6^{5}	6
WC	(United Kingdom) K O'Brien (United Kingdom) M South	1	2
2	(Czech Republic) V Chvojková (Czech Republic) N Vaidišová	6	6

Semifinals
4	(New Zealand) M Erakovic (Romania) M Niculescu	6	7^{9}
2	(Czech Republic) V Chvojková (Czech Republic) N Vaidišová	4	6^{7}
