= Ian Flanagan =

British tennis player

- Country (sports): United Kingdom
- Born: 15 January 1982 (age 44)
- Prize money: $46,354

Singles
- Career record: 2–1 (Grand Slam, ATP Tour level, and Davis Cup)
- Career titles: 0
- Highest ranking: No. 503 (11 November 2004)

Doubles
- Career record: 1–1 (Grand Slam, ATP Tour level, and Davis Cup)
- Career titles: 0
- Highest ranking: No. 366 (26 November 2007)
- Last updated on: 20 August 2018.

Ian Flanagan (born 15 January 1982) is a Welsh former professional tennis player.

== Biography ==
Flanagan grew up in the village of Graianrhyd, and attended Ysgol Brynhyfryd.

At the age of four, he attended a tennis fun-day with his brother. This sparked an interest that culminated in him, at the age of 15, being the top junior tennis player in the world and Youth Olympics gold medalist in 1996. However, a severe bout of glandular fever between 1998 and 2000 threatened to derail his career.

In 2004, Flanagan staged a shock upset when he beat Mark Philippoussis 7–6, 7–6, in the opening round of the Stella Artois Championship at Queen's Club. Despite also beating the world no. 35, Victor Hănescu, in the second round of the tournament, before succumbing to Sébastien Grosjean in the last 16, Flanagan was denied a wildcard into Wimbledon. The victory raised his profile, and put him on a tennis players' special Weakest Link.
