= 2004 Wimbledon Championships – Girls' singles =

Girls' singles
- 2004 Wimbledon Championships

Final
- Champion: (Ukraine) Kateryna Bondarenko
- Runner-up: (Serbia and Montenegro) Ana Ivanovic
- Score: 6–4, 6–7^{(2–7)}, 6–2

Details
- Draw: 64 (8 Q / 8 WC )
- Seeds: 16

Events
Singles	men	women		boys	girls
Doubles	men	women	mixed	boys	girls
WC Singles	men	women	quad
WC Doubles	men	women	quad
Legends	men	women	seniors
← 2003 ·	Wimbledon Championships	· 2005 →

Kirsten Flipkens was the defending champion but did not complete in the Juniors this year.

Kateryna Bondarenko defeated Ana Ivanovic in the final, 6–4, 6–7^{(2–7)}, 6–2 to win the girls' singles tennis title at the 2004 Wimbledon Championships.

This Wimbledon Girls' Singles event featured four future singles world No. 1 players, in Ana Ivanovic, Caroline Wozniacki, Victoria Azarenka and Angelique Kerber. During the tournament, there were two clashes between them, with Azarenka defeating Kerber at an early stage and then losing in the semifinals to Ivanovic.

== Seeds ==
1. (Netherlands) Michaëlla Krajicek (semifinals)
2. (Czech Republic) Nicole Vaidišová (quarterfinals)
3. (Serbia and Montenegro) Ana Ivanovic (final)
4. (Israel) Shahar Pe'er (quarterfinals)
5. (Chinese Taipei) Chan Yung-jan (second round)
6. (Ukraine) Kateryna Bondarenko (champion)
7. (Romania) Monica Niculescu (first round)
8. (Russia) Alisa Kleybanova (quarterfinals)
9. (Belarus) Victoria Azarenka (semifinals)
10. (Belarus) Olga Govortsova (third round)
11. (New Zealand) Marina Erakovic (third round)
12. (Czech Republic) Veronika Chvojková (first round)
13. (United States) Jessica Kirkland (second round)
14. (Japan) Ryōko Fuda (first round)
15. (Russia) Irina Kotkina (third round)
16. (Romania) Mădălina Gojnea (first round)

Click on the seed number of a player to go to their draw section.

== Draw ==
=== Key ===
- Q = Qualifier
- WC = Wild card
- LL = Lucky loser
- Alt = Alternate
- SE = Special exempt
- PR = Protected ranking
- ITF = ITF entry
- JE = Junior exempt
- w/o = Walkover
- r = Retired
- d = Defaulted
- SR = Special ranking

=== Finals ===
Quarterfinals
1	(Netherlands) Michaëlla Krajicek	6	6
(Serbia and Montenegro) Vojislava Lukić	1	2
4	(Israel) Shahar Pe'er	3	6	1
6	(Ukraine) Kateryna Bondarenko	6	3	6
8	(Russia) Alisa Kleybanova	6^{1}	1
3	(Serbia and Montenegro) Ana Ivanovic	7^{7}	6
9	(Belarus) Victoria Azarenka	7^{7}	7
2	(Czech Republic) Nicole Vaidišová	6^{4}	5

Semifinals
1	(Netherlands) Michaëlla Krajicek	6^{1}	6	4
6	(Ukraine) Kateryna Bondarenko	7^{7}	1	6
3	(Serbia and Montenegro) Ana Ivanovic	6	1	12
9	(Belarus) Victoria Azarenka	0	6	10

Final
6	(Ukraine) Kateryna Bondarenko	6	6^{2}	6
3	(Serbia and Montenegro) Ana Ivanovic	4	7^{7}	2

=== Top half ===
==== Section 1 ====
First round
1	(Netherlands) Michaëlla Krajicek	6	6
(Hungary) Ágnes Szávay	3	1
LL	(Netherlands) Nicole Thyssen	7^{7}	6
(Argentina) Florencia Molinero	6^{3}	2
Q	(United States) Elizabeth Kobak	6	3
(United States) Yasmin Schnack	3	1
(Slovakia) Magdaléna Rybáriková	1	4
15	(Russia) Irina Kotkina	6	6
12	(Czech Republic) Veronika Chvojková	2	6^{5}
(Italy) Giulia Gabba	6	7^{7}
(Russia) Evgeniya Rodina	6	6
(India) Tara Iyer	1	3
WC	(Australia) Sophie Ferguson	6	6	6
WC	(United Kingdom) Hannah Grady	7	4	2
(Serbia and Montenegro) Vojislava Lukić	0	6	8
7	(Romania) Monica Niculescu	6	3	6

Second round
1	(Netherlands) M Krajicek	6	6
LL	(Netherlands) N Thyssen	1	0
Q	(United States) E Kobak	6^{3}	3
15	(Russia) I Kotkina	7^{7}	6
(Italy) G Gabba	3	1
(Russia) E Rodina	6	6
WC	(Australia) S Ferguson	3	6	3
(Serbia and Montenegro) V Lukić	6	1	6

Third round
1	(Netherlands) M Krajicek	6	6
15	(Russia) I Kotkina	2	2
(Russia) E Rodina	5	1
(Serbia and Montenegro) V Lukić	7	6

Quarterfinals
1	(Netherlands) M Krajicek	6	6
(Serbia and Montenegro) V Lukić	1	2

==== Section 2 ====
First round
4	(Israel) Shahar Pe'er	6	6
(Russia) Regina Kulikova	3	2
WC	(United States) Neha Uberoi	6	6
(Slovenia) Ana Jerman	2	4
Q	(Serbia and Montenegro) Teodora Mirčić	4	1
(Romania) Ágnes Szatmári	6	6
(Czech Republic) Kateřina Kramperová	6	6
14	(Japan) Ryōko Fuda	3	4
10	(Belarus) Olga Govortsova	6	6
(Germany) Maraike Biglmaier	4	2
(Chinese Taipei) Hsu Wen-hsin	6^{4}	6	2
(Russia) Evgenia Grebenyuk	7^{7}	4	6
Q	(United Kingdom) Katharine Baker	6	4	2
(United States) Katrina Tsang	2	6	6
WC	(United Kingdom) Katie O'Brien	2	3
6	(Ukraine) Kateryna Bondarenko	6	6

Second round
4	(Israel) S Pe'er	6	6
WC	(United States) N Uberoi	3	2
(Romania) Á Szatmári	6	6
(Czech Republic) K Kramperová	2	3
10	(Belarus) O Govortsova	6	6
(Russia) E Grebenyuk	2	4
(United States) K Tsang	0	1
6	(Ukraine) K Bondarenko	6	6

Third round
4	(Israel) S Pe'er	6	6
(Romania) Á Szatmári	1	1
10	(Belarus) O Govortsova	2	4
6	(Ukraine) K Bondarenko	6	6

Quarterfinals
4	(Israel) S Pe'er	3	6	1
6	(Ukraine) K Bondarenko	6	3	6

=== Bottom half ===
==== Section 3 ====
First round
8	(Russia) Alisa Kleybanova	6	6
WC	(United Kingdom) Lara Fakhoury	1	1
Q	(Japan) Yurika Sema	4	7	0
(Germany) Tatjana Malek	6	5	6
(Italy) Verdiana Verardi	3	6^{6}
(Czech Republic) Nikola Fraňková	6	7^{8}
Q	(Russia) Ekaterina Kirianova	6^{2}	4
11	(New Zealand) Marina Erakovic	7^{7}	6
16	(Romania) Mădălina Gojnea	5	6	3
(Russia) Ekaterina Kosminskaya	7	4	6
Q	(Australia) Bojana Bobusic	1	6	10
LL	(Denmark) Caroline Wozniacki	6	2	8
Q	(France) Irena Pavlovic	6	6
(Ecuador) Estefania Balda Álvarez	2	0
(Croatia) Sanja Ančić	0^{r}
3	(Serbia and Montenegro) Ana Ivanovic	5

Second round
8	(Russia) A Kleybanova	6	6
(Germany) T Malek	1	1
(Czech Republic) N Fraňková	4	4
11	(New Zealand) M Erakovic	6	6
(Russia) E Kosminskaya	6	6
Q	(Australia) B Bobusic	1	2
Q	(France) I Pavlovic	1	4
3	(Serbia and Montenegro) A Ivanovic	6	6

Third round
8	(Russia) A Kleybanova	6	6
11	(New Zealand) M Erakovic	1	3
(Russia) E Kosminskaya	6	1	1
3	(Serbia and Montenegro) A Ivanovic	4	6	6

Quarterfinals
8	(Russia) A Kleybanova	6^{1}	1
3	(Serbia and Montenegro) A Ivanovic	7^{7}	6

==== Section 4 ====
First round
5	(Chinese Taipei) Chan Yung-jan	7	6
Q	(France) Ana-Maria Zubori	5	4
(Canada) Aleksandra Wozniak	6	6
(China) Sun Shengnan	2	2
(Germany) Angelique Kerber	6	7
WC	(United States) Carly Gullickson	1	5
WC	(United Kingdom) Melanie South	1	3
9	(Belarus) Victoria Azarenka	6	6
13	(United States) Jessica Kirkland	6	6
(Slovenia) Maša Zec Peškirič	3	2
(South Africa) Ghizela Schutte	4	3
(Russia) Alla Kudryavtseva	6	6
(Slovakia) Jana Juricová	6^{3}	6	3
WC	(United Kingdom) Claire Peterzan	7^{7}	3	6
(Thailand) Pichittra Thongdach	3	0
2	(Czech Republic) Nicole Vaidišová	6	6

Second round
5	(Chinese Taipei) Y-j Chan	4	5
(Canada) A Wozniak	6	7
(Germany) A Kerber	6	5	3
9	(Belarus) V Azarenka	1	7	6
13	(United States) A Kirkland	5	4
(Russia) A Kudryavtseva	7	6
WC	(United Kingdom) C Peterzan	2	3
2	(Czech Republic) N Vaidišová	6	6

Third round
(Canada) A Wozniak	7	4	5
9	(Belarus) V Azarenka	5	6	7
(Russia) A Kudryavtseva	5	2
2	(Czech Republic) N Vaidišová	7	6

Quarterfinals
9	(Belarus) V Azarenka	7^{7}	7
2	(Czech Republic) N Vaidišová	6^{4}	5
