= 2004 Wimbledon Championships – Boys' doubles =

Boys' doubles
- 2004 Wimbledon Championships

Final
- Champions: (United States) Brendan Evans (United States) Scott Oudsema
- Runners-up: (Netherlands) Robin Haase (Serbia and Montenegro) Viktor Troicki
- Score: 6–4, 6–4

Events
Singles	men	women		boys	girls
Doubles	men	women	mixed	boys	girls
WC Singles	men	women	quad
WC Doubles	men	women	quad
Legends	men	women	seniors
← 2003 ·	Wimbledon Championships	· 2005 →

Florin Mergea and Horia Tecău were the defending champions, but they did not compete in the Juniors this year.

Brendan Evans and Scott Oudsema defeated Robin Haase and Viktor Troicki in the final, 6–4, 6–4 to win the boys' doubles tennis title at the 2004 Wimbledon Championships.

== Seeds ==
1. (United States) Alex Kuznetsov / (Germany) Mischa Zverev (quarterfinals)
2. (United States) Brendan Evans / (United States) Scott Oudsema (champion)
3. (South Korea) Jun Woong-sun / (South Korea) Kim Sun-yong (first round)
4. (El Salvador) Rafael Arévalo / (Netherlands) Coen van Keulen (semifinals)
5. (India) Karan Rastogi / (Chinese Taipei) Yi Chu-huan (quarterfinals)
6. (Spain) Guillermo Alcaide / (Ukraine) Sergei Bubka (semifinals)
7. (United States) Scoville Jenkins / (United Kingdom) Miles Kasiri (first round)
8. (Slovakia) Kamil Čapkovič / (Slovakia) Lukáš Lacko (quarterfinals)

== Draw ==
=== Key ===
- Q = Qualifier
- WC = Wild card
- LL = Lucky loser
- Alt = Alternate
- SE = Special exempt
- PR = Protected ranking
- ITF = ITF entry
- JE = Junior exempt
- w/o = Walkover
- r = Retired
- d = Defaulted
- SR = Special ranking

=== Finals ===
Semifinals
(Netherlands) Robin Haase (Serbia and Montenegro) Viktor Troicki	6	6
6	(Spain) Guillermo Alcaide (Ukraine) Sergei Bubka	3	3
4	(El Salvador) Rafael Arévalo (Netherlands) Coen van Keulen	3	6	4
2	(United States) Brendan Evans (United States) Scott Oudsema	6	3	6

Final
(Netherlands) Robin Haase (Serbia and Montenegro) Viktor Troicki	4	4
2	(United States) Brendan Evans (United States) Scott Oudsema	6	6

=== Top half ===
First round
1	(United States) Alex Kuznetsov (Germany) Mischa Zverev	6	6
(India) Tushar Liberhan (India) Divij Sharan	3	4
(United Kingdom) Jamie Baker (United Kingdom) Tom Rushby	4	4
(United States) Timothy Neilly (United States) Phillip Simmonds	6	6
(France) Jérémy Chardy (France) Fabrice Martin	6	6^{4}	4
(Germany) Daniel Müller (Germany) Sebastian Rieschick	3	7^{7}	6
(Netherlands) Robin Haase (Serbia and Montenegro) Viktor Troicki	6	6^{4}	7
7	(United States) Scoville Jenkins (United Kingdom) Miles Kasiri	4	7^{7}	5
3	(South Korea) Jun Woong-sun (South Korea) Kim Sun-yong	4	6^{0}
(United States) Nikita Kryvonos (Ukraine) Alexander Nedovesov	6	7^{7}
WC	(United Kingdom) Jack Baker (United Kingdom) James Lloyd	5	7	1
WC	(United Kingdom) Nick Cavaday (United Kingdom) Richard Wire	7	5	6
(Italy) Andrea Arnaboldi (Argentina) Juan Martín del Potro	3	2
(Australia) Lachlan Ferguson (Australia) Joel Kerley	6	6
(Slovakia) Peter Miklušičák (Croatia) Vilim Višak	3	4
6	(Spain) Guillermo Alcaide (Ukraine) Sergei Bubka	6	6

Second round
1	(United States) A Kuznetsov (Germany) M Zverev	6	7^{7}
(United States) T Neilly (United States) P Simmonds	1	6^{3}
(Germany) D Müller (Germany) S Rieschick	3	2
(Netherlands) R Haase (Serbia and Montenegro) V Troicki	6	6
(United States) N Kryvonos (Ukraine) A Nedovesov	7^{7}	6
WC	(United Kingdom) N Cavaday (United Kingdom) R Wire	6^{2}	5
(Australia) L Ferguson (Australia) J Kerley	6	3	3
6	(Spain) G Alcaide (Ukraine) S Bubka	2	6	6

Quarterfinals
1	(United States) A Kuznetsov (Germany) M Zverev	6^{3}	7^{7}	12
(Netherlands) R Haase (Serbia and Montenegro) V Troicki	7^{7}	6^{4}	14
(United States) N Kryvonos (Ukraine) A Nedovesov	2	7^{8}	2
6	(Spain) G Alcaide (Ukraine) S Bubka	6	6^{6}	6

Semifinals
(Netherlands) R Haase (Serbia and Montenegro) V Troicki	6	6
6	(Spain) G Alcaide (Ukraine) S Bubka	3	3

=== Bottom half ===
First round
8	(Slovakia) Kamil Čapkovič (Slovakia) Lukáš Lacko
(Italy) Fabio Fognini (Germany) Aljoscha Thron	w/o
(Belgium) Niels Desein (Finland) Juho Paukku	6	6
(Japan) Takanobu Fujii (Indonesia) Sunu-Wahya Trijati	2	3
WC	(United Kingdom) Matthew Brown (United Kingdom) Jamie Murray	7^{7}	6^{5}	7
(Australia) David Galic (Netherlands) Remko de Rijke	6^{1}	7^{7}	5
(New Zealand) G.D. Jones (New Zealand) William Ward	4	4
4	(El Salvador) Rafael Arévalo (Netherlands) Coen van Keulen	6	6
5	(India) Karan Rastogi (Chinese Taipei) Yi Chu-huan	6^{6}	6	6
(Austria) Martin Fischer (Austria) Philipp Oswald	7^{8}	1	2
(Argentina) Juan-Pablo Amado (United States) Vahid Mirzadeh	7	6
(Brazil) Thomaz Bellucci (Morocco) Mehdi Ziadi	5	3
WC	(United Kingdom) Dominic Inglot (United Kingdom) Faris Khatib	6^{4}	6	9
Alt	(Ghana) Salifu Mohammed (United States) Donald Young	7^{7}	3	7
(South Africa) Kevin Anderson (United States) Greg Ouellette	4	6^{7}
2	(United States) Brendan Evans (United States) Scott Oudsema	6	7^{9}

Second round
8	(Slovakia) K Čapkovič (Slovakia) L Lacko	7^{7}	6
(Belgium) N Desein (Finland) J Paukku	6^{3}	4
WC	(United Kingdom) M Brown (United Kingdom) J Murray	6	4	3
4	(El Salvador) R Arévalo (Netherlands) C van Keulen	3	6	6
5	(India) K Rastogi (Chinese Taipei) C-h Yi	6	6
(Argentina) J-P Amado (United States) V Mirzadeh	1	3
WC	(United Kingdom) D Inglot (United Kingdom) F Khatib	1	3
2	(United States) B Evans (United States) S Oudsema	6	6

Quarterfinals
8	(Slovakia) K Čapkovič (Slovakia) L Lacko	2	6	4
4	(El Salvador) R Arévalo (Netherlands) C van Keulen	6	2	6
5	(India) K Rastogi (Chinese Taipei) C-h Yi	2	2
2	(United States) B Evans (United States) S Oudsema	6	6

Semifinals
4	(El Salvador) R Arévalo (Netherlands) C van Keulen	3	6	4
2	(United States) B Evans (United States) S Oudsema	6	3	6
