= 2004 Wimbledon Championships – Men's singles =

Men's singles
- 2004 Wimbledon Championships

Final
- Champion: (Switzerland) Roger Federer
- Runner-up: (United States) Andy Roddick
- Score: 4–6, 7–5, 7–6^{(7–3)}, 6–4

Details
- Draw: 128 (16 Q / 8 WC )
- Seeds: 32

Events
Singles	men	women		boys	girls
Doubles	men	women	mixed	boys	girls
WC Singles	men	women	quad
WC Doubles	men	women	quad
Legends	men	women	seniors
← 2003 ·	Wimbledon Championships	· 2005 →

Defending champion Roger Federer defeated Andy Roddick in the final, 4–6, 7–5, 7–6^{(7–3)}, 6–4 to win the gentlemen's singles tennis title at the 2004 Wimbledon Championships. It was his second Wimbledon title and third major title overall. This tournament marked the beginning of Federer's record streak of 23 consecutive major semifinals and 36 consecutive major quarterfinals (in which he made 20 finals and won 14 titles). The final was a rematch of the previous year's semifinal.

This tournament marked the final professional appearance of 2001 champion and former world No. 2 Goran Ivanišević. He lost in the third round to 2002 champion Lleyton Hewitt. Wayne Ferreira made his 55th consecutive main draw major appearance, surpassing Stefan Edberg's all-time record.

This was the third year in Wimbledon history, after 1991 and 1997, that there was play on the Middle Sunday, due to bad weather in the first week.

== Seeds ==
1. (Switzerland) Roger Federer (champion)
2. (United States) Andy Roddick (final)
3. (Argentina) Guillermo Coria (second round)
4. (Argentina) David Nalbandian (withdrew)
5. (United Kingdom) Tim Henman (quarterfinals)
6. (Spain) Juan Carlos Ferrero (third round)
7. (Australia) Lleyton Hewitt (quarterfinals)
8. (Germany) Rainer Schüttler (third round)
9. (Spain) Carlos Moyá (fourth round)
10. (France) Sébastien Grosjean (semifinals)
11. (Australia) Mark Philippoussis (fourth round)
12. (Netherlands) Sjeng Schalken (quarterfinals)
13. (Thailand) Paradorn Srichaphan (first round)
14. (United States) Mardy Fish (second round)
15. (Chile) Nicolás Massú (first round)
16. (Czech Republic) Jiří Novák (first round)
17. (Sweden) Jonas Björkman (third round)
18. (Spain) Feliciano López (third round)
19. (Russia) Marat Safin (first round)
20. (Spain) Tommy Robredo (second round)
21. (Argentina) Juan Ignacio Chela (second round)
22. (Romania) Andrei Pavel (second round)
23. (Belarus) Max Mirnyi (first round)
24. (Chile) Fernando González (third round)
25. (Slovakia) Dominik Hrbatý (third round)
26. (United States) Taylor Dent (third round)
27. (United States) Robby Ginepri (fourth round)
28. (Croatia) Ivan Ljubičić (first round)
29. (Germany) Nicolas Kiefer (first round)
30. (United States) Vince Spadea (fourth round)
31. (Russia) Mikhail Youzhny (first round)
32. (Morocco) Hicham Arazi (third round)
33. (Peru) Luis Horna (first round)

Click on the seed number of a player to go to their draw section.

David Nalbandian withdrew due to injury. He was replaced in the draw by the highest-ranked non-seeded player Luis Horna, who became the #33 seed.

== Draw ==
=== Key ===
- Q = Qualifier
- WC = Wild card
- LL = Lucky loser
- Alt = Alternate
- ITF = ITF entry
- PR = Protected ranking
- SR = Special ranking
- SE = Special exempt
- JE = Junior exempt
- JR = Junior Accelerator Programme entrant
- CO = College Accelerator Programme entrant
- NG = Next Gen Accelerator Program entrant
- w/o = Walkover
- r = Retired
- d = Defaulted

=== Finals ===
Quarterfinals
1	(Switzerland) Roger Federer	6	6^{1}	6	6
7	(Australia) Lleyton Hewitt	1	7^{7}	0	4
(Germany) Florian Mayer	5	4	2
10	(France) Sébastien Grosjean	7	6	6
5	(United Kingdom) Tim Henman	6^{5}	4	2
(Croatia) Mario Ančić	7^{7}	6	6
12	(Netherlands) Sjeng Schalken	6^{4}	6^{9}	3
2	(United States) Andy Roddick	7^{7}	7^{11}	6

Semifinals
1	(Switzerland) Roger Federer	6	6	7^{8}
10	(France) Sébastien Grosjean	2	3	6^{6}
(Croatia) Mario Ančić	4	6	5	5
2	(United States) Andy Roddick	6	4	7	7

Final
1	(Switzerland) Roger Federer	4	7	7^{7}	6
2	(United States) Andy Roddick	6	5	6^{3}	4

=== Top half ===
==== Section 1 ====
First round
1	(Switzerland) R Federer	6	6	6
WC	(United Kingdom) A Bogdanovic	3	3	0
Q	(Austria) J Knowle	6	3	1	3
Q	(Colombia) A Falla	2	6	6	6
(Spain) A Martín	5	2	6	2
(France) F Santoro	7	6	3	6
PR	(Sweden) T Johansson	4	4	6	6	6
29	(Germany) N Kiefer	6	6	4	3	0
18	(Spain) F López	6	6	7
WC	(United Kingdom) R Bloomfield	4	2	5
(France) C Saulnier	7	4	7^{8}	7^{7}
(France) M Llodra	5	6	6^{6}	6^{3}
(Belgium) G Elseneer	7^{7}	7^{7}	7^{7}
WC	(United Kingdom) A Parmar	6^{5}	6^{5}	6^{3}
(Croatia) I Karlović	3	6	6	6
13	(Thailand) P Srichaphan	6	4	4	4

Second round
1	(Switzerland) R Federer	6	6	6
Q	(Colombia) A Falla	1	2	0
(France) F Santoro	5	2	1
PR	(Sweden) T Johansson	7	6	6
18	(Spain) F López	3	6	6	6^{3}	8
(France) C Saulnier	6	3	4	7^{7}	6
(Belgium) G Elseneer	4	4	6	6^{14}
(Croatia) I Karlović	6	6	3	7^{16}

Third round
1	(Switzerland) R Federer	6	6	6
PR	(Sweden) T Johansson	3	4	3
18	(Spain) F López	6^{12}	6^{3}	7^{7}	5
(Croatia) I Karlović	7^{14}	7^{7}	6^{2}	7

Fourth round
1	(Switzerland) R Federer	6	7^{7}	7^{7}
(Croatia) I Karlović	3	6^{3}	6^{5}

==== Section 2 ====
First round
9	(Spain) C Moyá	6	3	7	6^{6}	6
Q	(France) O Patience	4	6	5	7^{8}	1
(Spain) À Corretja	6	3	2	7	4
(Czech Republic) R Štěpánek	4	6	6	5	6
(Armenia) S Sargsian	6	6	4	6
(Spain) M López	4	3	6	2
(Russia) D Tursunov	4	7	6	7^{7}
19	(Russia) M Safin	6	5	3	6^{1}
31	(Russia) M Youzhny	3	6^{4}	2
WC	(Croatia) G Ivanišević	6	7^{7}	6
Q	(United Kingdom) J Delgado	1	3	3
(Italy) F Volandri	6	6	6
(Georgia (country)) I Labadze	6	6	3	6
(Belgium) K Vliegen	2	4	6	2
(Austria) J Melzer	2	4	2
7	(Australia) L Hewitt	6	6	6

Second round
9	(Spain) C Moyá	6	6	6^{5}	7
(Czech Republic) R Štěpánek	4	4	7^{7}	5
(Armenia) S Sargsian	3	6^{5}	6	6	13
(Russia) D Tursunov	6	7^{7}	3	4	15
WC	(Croatia) G Ivanišević	4	7^{10}	1	6	6
(Italy) F Volandri	6	6^{8}	6	3	4
(Georgia (country)) I Labadze	4	4	1
7	(Australia) L Hewitt	6	6	6

Third round
9	(Spain) C Moyá	6	6	7
(Russia) D Tursunov	1	4	5
WC	(Croatia) G Ivanišević	2	3	4
7	(Australia) L Hewitt	6	6	6

Fourth round
9	(Spain) C Moyá	4	2	6	6^{3}
7	(Australia) L Hewitt	6	6	4	7^{7}

==== Section 3 ====
First round
3	(Argentina) G Coria	6	6^{3}	6	6^{3}	6
(South Africa) W Moodie	4	7^{7}	3	7^{7}	3
(Germany) F Mayer	7^{7}	7^{7}	7^{7}
(Australia) W Arthurs	6^{4}	6^{5}	6^{4}
(Slovakia) K Kučera	6	6	6
(Spain) Ó Hernández	1	2	2
(South Africa) W Ferreira	5	7^{7}	7	6
28	(Croatia) I Ljubičić	7	6^{5}	5	2
17	(Sweden) J Björkman	5	6	7	6
(Netherlands) R Sluiter	7	1	5	1
(Czech Republic) J Vacek	3	6	3	2
(Chinese Taipei) Y-h Lu	6	4	6	6
(France) A Clément	2	6^{3}	6^{7}
(Sweden) J Johansson	6	7^{7}	7^{9}
Q	(Spain) I Navarro	3	2	3
14	(United States) M Fish	6	6	6

Second round
3	(Argentina) G Coria	6	3	3	4
(Germany) F Mayer	4	6	6	6
(Slovakia) K Kučera	6^{3}	3	1
(South Africa) W Ferreira	7^{7}	6	6
17	(Sweden) J Björkman	6	6	6
(Chinese Taipei) Y-h Lu	4	3	4
(Sweden) J Johansson	6^{8}	6	6	6
14	(United States) M Fish	7^{10}	3	4	4

Third round
(Germany) F Mayer	4	6	6	6
(South Africa) W Ferreira	6	4	1	4
17	(Sweden) J Björkman	7^{7}	6^{5}	6^{6}	3
(Sweden) J Johansson	6^{5}	7^{7}	7^{8}	6

Fourth round
(Germany) F Mayer	6	6^{5}	7^{7}	6
(Sweden) J Johansson	3	7^{7}	6^{5}	4

==== Section 4 ====
First round
10	(France) S Grosjean	6	6	6
(France) T Ascione	4	2	4
(Belgium) O Rochus	6^{5}	4	4
(France) G Carraz	7^{7}	6	6
Q	(Italy) D Bracciali	3	4	6	6	6
Q	(Czech Republic) J Hernych	6	6	2	3	3
(United States) J-M Gambill	6	7	6
23	(Belarus) M Mirnyi	3	5	4
27	(United States) R Ginepri	4	7	6	6
Q	(Serbia and Montenegro) J Tipsarević	6	5	3	3
(Spain) F Verdasco	6	6	6
Q	(United States) G Weiner	4	4	4
(Austria) S Koubek	4	6	6	6
(Argentina) J Acasuso	6	4	1	1
(France) J Boutter	4	6^{4}	3
6	(Spain) JC Ferrero	6	7^{7}	6

Second round
10	(France) S Grosjean	6	6	6
(France) G Carraz	1	2	2
Q	(Italy) D Bracciali	7^{7}	6^{6}	3	2
(United States) J-M Gambill	6^{4}	7^{8}	6	6
27	(United States) R Ginepri	6^{3}	6	6	6
(Spain) F Verdasco	7^{7}	4	4	3
(Austria) S Koubek	6	5	7	6^{6}	6
6	(Spain) JC Ferrero	4	7	5	7^{8}	8

Third round
10	(France) S Grosjean	7^{7}	6	6
(United States) J-M Gambill	6^{5}	3	2
27	(United States) R Ginepri	6	6	6
6	(Spain) JC Ferrero	3	4	1

Fourth round
10	(France) S Grosjean	6	6	7^{7}
27	(United States) R Ginepri	2	2	6^{4}

=== Bottom half ===
==== Section 5 ====
First round
5	(United Kingdom) T Henman	4	7^{8}	6	6
(Spain) R Ramírez Hidalgo	6	6^{6}	4	2
(Brazil) F Saretta	7	0	1	6^{9}
Q	(Switzerland) I Heuberger	5	6	6	7^{11}
(Spain) D Ferrer	7^{7}	6	6^{4}	7
(Romania) V Hănescu	6^{5}	4	7^{7}	5
Q	(Brazil) A Sá	1	4	2
32	(Morocco) H Arazi	6	6	6
24	(Chile) F González	6	6	6
(Argentina) M Vassallo Argüello	4	2	4
(Russia) I Andreev	2	6	6	6
(Netherlands) J van Lottum	6	2	0	3
(Netherlands) M Verkerk	4	6	6	7
(Russia) N Davydenko	6	3	4	5
Q	(Belgium) C Rochus	3	4	2
11	(Australia) M Philippoussis	6	6	6

Second round
5	(United Kingdom) T Henman	7	6	6
Q	(Switzerland) I Heuberger	5	3	2
(Spain) D Ferrer	7^{7}	4	3	6^{7}
32	(Morocco) H Arazi	6^{5}	6	6	7^{9}
24	(Chile) F González	7	6	5	6^{4}	6
(Russia) I Andreev	5	3	7	7^{7}	3
(Netherlands) M Verkerk	6	3	6^{5}	5
11	(Australia) M Philippoussis	4	6	7^{7}	7

Third round
5	(United Kingdom) T Henman	7^{8}	6	3	6
32	(Morocco) H Arazi	6^{6}	4	6	2
24	(Chile) F González	4	1	7^{7}	5
11	(Australia) M Philippoussis	6	6	6^{4}	7

Fourth round
5	(United Kingdom) T Henman	6	7	6^{3}	7^{7}
11	(Australia) M Philippoussis	2	5	7^{7}	6^{5}

==== Section 6 ====
First round
16	(Czech Republic) J Novák	3	4	4
(Belgium) X Malisse	6	6	6
(France) A Dupuis	6	6	6^{8}	4	6
PR	(Germany) T Haas	2	2	7^{10}	6	8
(Slovakia) K Beck	6	6^{3}	4	6	10
WC	(United Kingdom) J Marray	4	7^{7}	6	3	8
LL	(Italy) P Starace	4	4	4
20	(Spain) T Robredo	6	6	6
25	(Slovakia) D Hrbatý	6	6	6
(Spain) D Sánchez	2	4	2
WC	(United Kingdom) M Hilton	6	6	6
(Spain) A Costa	1	4	3
LL	(France) J Benneteau	6	7	6
(Czech Republic) T Berdych	3	5	4
(Croatia) M Ančić	6^{5}	6	6	6
33	(Peru) L Horna	7^{7}	4	3	4

Second round
(Belgium) X Malisse	3	6	6	6
PR	(Germany) T Haas	6	3	2	4
(Slovakia) K Beck	6	6	7^{7}
20	(Spain) T Robredo	3	2	6^{2}
25	(Slovakia) D Hrbatý	7	6	6
WC	(United Kingdom) M Hilton	5	4	2
LL	(France) J Benneteau	6	6^{8}	2	7	4
(Croatia) M Ančić	4	7^{10}	6	5	6

Third round
(Belgium) X Malisse	6	6	6
(Slovakia) K Beck	3	3	4
25	(Slovakia) D Hrbatý	5	3	5
(Croatia) M Ančić	7	6	7

Fourth round
(Belgium) X Malisse	5	1^{r}
(Croatia) M Ančić	7	3

==== Section 7 ====
First round
8	(Germany) R Schüttler	4	6	7^{7}	1	6
(Sweden) R Söderling	6	3	6^{5}	6	2
WC	(United Kingdom) G Rusedski	7	4	6	6
LL	(Italy) D Sanguinetti	5	6	2	2
(Spain) F Mantilla	7^{7}	4	7	6
PR	(Denmark) K Pless	6^{5}	6	5	1
WC	(Australia) T Reid	2	4	2
30	(United States) V Spadea	6	6	6
21	(Argentina) JI Chela	6	4	6	6
(Germany) L Burgsmüller	4	6	0	2
(Sweden) T Enqvist	4	7^{7}	6	7^{7}
(Spain) G Blanco	6	6^{2}	4	6^{1}
(United States) T Martin	4	6	7^{7}	4	9
(Argentina) G Cañas	6	3	6^{1}	6	7
WC	(United Kingdom) L Childs	2	1	3
12	(Netherlands) S Schalken	6	6	6

Second round
8	(Germany) R Schüttler	6^{5}	7^{12}	6^{5}	6	6
WC	(United Kingdom) G Rusedski	7^{7}	6^{10}	7^{7}	2	2
(Spain) F Mantilla	1	2	2
30	(United States) V Spadea	6	6	6
21	(Argentina) JI Chela	3	7^{7}	1	6	3
(Sweden) T Enqvist	6	6^{4}	6	3	6
(United States) T Martin	3	2	6	3
12	(Netherlands) S Schalken	6	6	4	6

Third round
8	(Germany) R Schüttler	4	2	3
30	(United States) V Spadea	6	6	6
(Sweden) T Enqvist	7	2	6	6^{8}	2
12	(Netherlands) S Schalken	5	6	3	7^{10}	6

Fourth round
30	(United States) V Spadea	2	5	6	2
12	(Netherlands) S Schalken	6	7	3	6

==== Section 8 ====
First round
15	(Chile) N Massú	2	4	4
(Germany) A Popp	6	6	6
PR	(Czech Republic) B Ulihrach	4	2	3
(Spain) A Montañés	6	6	6
(Denmark) K Carlsen	3	7^{7}	7^{7}	6^{0}	6
Q	(France) R Gasquet	6	6^{5}	6^{4}	7^{7}	4
Q	(Israel) A Ram	3	5	6^{8}
22	(Romania) A Pavel	6	7	7^{10}
26	(United States) T Dent	6	6	6
Q	(Paraguay) R Delgado	2	3	4
LL	(Italy) S Pescosolido	4	4	6	7^{7}	10
(Netherlands) D van Scheppingen	6	6	4	6^{5}	8
LL	(Austria) A Peya	6	6	6
(United States) J Salzenstein	2	4	2
Q	(Chinese Taipei) J Wang	3	5	4
2	(United States) A Roddick	6	7	6

Second round
(Germany) A Popp	6	6	6
(Spain) A Montañés	1	0	1
(Denmark) K Carlsen	7^{11}	6	6
22	(Romania) A Pavel	6^{9}	4	3
26	(United States) T Dent	6	6	7^{7}
LL	(Italy) S Pescosolido	3	3	6^{3}
LL	(Austria) A Peya	3	6^{2}	4
2	(United States) A Roddick	6	7^{7}	6

Third round
(Germany) A Popp	7	6	6
(Denmark) K Carlsen	5	4	4
26	(United States) T Dent	3	6^{6}	6^{1}
2	(United States) A Roddick	6	7^{8}	7^{7}

Fourth round
(Germany) A Popp	5	4	4
2	(United States) A Roddick	7	6	6

Preceded by 2004 French Open – Men's singles	Grand Slam men's singles	Succeeded by 2004 US Open – Men's singles
