= 2004 Wimbledon Championships – Boys' singles =

Boys' singles
- 2004 Wimbledon Championships

Final
- Champion: (France) Gaël Monfils
- Runner-up: (United Kingdom) Miles Kasiri
- Score: 7–5, 7–6^{(8-6)}

Details
- Draw: 64 (8 Q / 8 WC )
- Seeds: 16

Events
Singles	men	women		boys	girls
Doubles	men	women	mixed	boys	girls
WC Singles	men	women	quad
WC Doubles	men	women	quad
Legends	men	women	seniors
← 2003 ·	Wimbledon Championships	· 2005 →

Florin Mergea was the defending champion, but did not complete in the Juniors this year.

Gaël Monfils defeated Miles Kasiri in the final, 7–5, 7–6^{(8-6)} to win the boys' singles tennis title at the 2004 Wimbledon Championships.

== Seeds ==
1. (France) Gaël Monfils (champion)
2. (United Kingdom) Andy Murray (third round)
3. (France) Josselin Ouanna (third round)
4. (Slovakia) Kamil Čapkovič (third round)
5. (United States) Alex Kuznetsov (second round)
6. (Germany) Mischa Zverev (second round)
7. (United States) Brendan Evans (quarterfinals)
8. (Germany) Sebastian Rieschick (third round)
9. (Spain) Pablo Andújar (first round)
10. (South Korea) Kim Sun-yong (first round)
11. (United States) Scoville Jenkins (semifinals)
12. (India) Karan Rastogi (first round)
13. (Italy) Fabio Fognini (first round)
14. (United States) Scott Oudsema (first round)
15. (Netherlands) Coen van Keulen (first round)
16. (Netherlands) Remko de Rijke (third round)

Click on the seed number of a player to go to their draw section.

== Draw ==
=== Key ===
- Q = Qualifier
- WC = Wild card
- LL = Lucky loser
- Alt = Alternate
- SE = Special exempt
- PR = Protected ranking
- ITF = ITF entry
- JE = Junior exempt
- w/o = Walkover
- r = Retired
- d = Defaulted
- SR = Special ranking

=== Finals ===
Quarterfinals
1	(France) Gaël Monfils	7	6
7	(United States) Brendan Evans	5	2
(United Kingdom) Jamie Baker	4	6^{4}
Q	(France) Jérémy Chardy	6	7^{7}
(New Zealand) William Ward	4	3
(United Kingdom) Miles Kasiri	6	6
11	(United States) Scoville Jenkins	6	6
(South Korea) Jun Woong-sun	3	3

Semifinals
1	(France) Gaël Monfils	6	6
Q	(France) Jérémy Chardy	4	2
(United Kingdom) Miles Kasiri	7^{7}	7^{7}
11	(United States) Scoville Jenkins	6^{5}	6^{3}

Final
1	(France) Gaël Monfils	7	7^{8}
(United Kingdom) Miles Kasiri	5	6^{6}

=== Top half ===
==== Section 1 ====
First round
1	(France) Gaël Monfils	7^{7}	6
(United Kingdom) Tom Rushby	6^{2}	4
(United States) Phillip Simmonds	6^{5}	6^{7}
(Morocco) Mehdi Ziadi	7^{7}	7^{9}
WC	(United Kingdom) Jack Baker	2	3
Q	(Finland) Juho Paukku	6	6
Q	(United States) Greg Ouellette	6	3	4
16	(Netherlands) Remko de Rijke	3	6	6
12	(India) Karan Rastogi	4	4
(New Zealand) G.D. Jones	6	6
(Spain) Guillermo Alcaide	3
(Germany) Aljoscha Thron	1^{r}
(Argentina) Juan-Pablo Amado	6	3	6
WC	(United Kingdom) Faris Khatib	1	6	1
(Italy) Andrea Arnaboldi	2	0
7	(United States) Brendan Evans	6	6

Second round
1	(France) G Monfils	4	7^{7}	6
(Morocco) M Ziadi	6	6^{2}	2
Q	(Finland) J Paukku	4	3
16	(Netherlands) R de Rijke	6	6
(New Zealand) G.D. Jones	7	3	6
(Spain) G Alcaide	5	6	4
(Argentina) J-P Amado	4	4
7	(United States) B Evans	6	6

Third round
1	(France) G Monfils	6	6
16	(Netherlands) R de Rijke	2	4
(New Zealand) G.D. Jones	2	1
7	(United States) B Evans	6	6

Quarterfinals
1	(France) G Monfils	7	6
7	(United States) B Evans	5	2

==== Section 2 ====
First round
4	(Slovakia) Kamil Čapkovič	6	6
(Brazil) Thomaz Bellucci	3	2
Q	(South Africa) Kevin Anderson	6	3	6
(Australia) Joel Kerley	4	6	1
(United Kingdom) Jamie Baker	6	6
WC	(Solomon Islands) Michael Leong	2	0
(Ukraine) Sergei Bubka	7	4	6
14	(United States) Scott Oudsema	5	6	0
10	(South Korea) Kim Sun-yong	1	5
Q	(France) Jérémy Chardy	6	7
WC	(United Kingdom) Matthew Brown	2	4
(Croatia) Vilim Višak	6	6
WC	(United States) Donald Young	3	6	6
(Netherlands) Robin Haase	6	2	1
(United Kingdom) Jamie Murray	4	6	1
8	(Germany) Sebastian Rieschick	6	4	6

Second round
4	(Slovakia) K Čapkovič	4	6	8
Q	(South Africa) Kevin Anderson	6	3	6
(United Kingdom) J Baker	6	7^{7}
(Ukraine) Sergei Bubka	1	6^{1}
Q	(France) J Chardy	6	6
(Croatia) Vilim Višak	1	4
WC	(United States) Donald Young	2	4
8	(Germany) S Rieschick	6	6

Third round
4	(Slovakia) K Čapkovič	3	4
(United Kingdom) J Baker	6	6
Q	(France) J Chardy	6	2	6
8	(Germany) S Rieschick	2	6	2

Quarterfinals
(United Kingdom) J Baker	4	6^{4}
Q	(France) J Chardy	6	7^{7}

=== Bottom half ===
==== Section 3 ====
First round
5	(United States) Alex Kuznetsov	6	7^{7}
(Germany) Daniel Müller	2	6^{4}
WC	(Belgium) Niels Desein	6	6
WC	(United Kingdom) Richard Wire	3	2
(Slovakia) Lukáš Lacko	7^{7}	3	4
Q	(Germany) Roman Herold	6^{5}	6	6
(New Zealand) William Ward	2	6	6
9	(Spain) Pablo Andújar	6	2	4
15	(Netherlands) Coen van Keulen	4	4
(United States) Timothy Neilly	6	6
(El Salvador) Rafael Arévalo	0	6^{17}
(United Kingdom) Miles Kasiri	6	7^{19}
(Chinese Taipei) Yi Chu-huan	6	3	6
(India) Divij Sharan	1	6	1
(Australia) Lachlan Ferguson	6^{4}	2
3	(France) Josselin Ouanna	7^{7}	6

Second round
5	(United States) A Kuznetsov	4	6^{5}
WC	(Belgium) N Desein	6	7^{7}
Q	(Germany) R Herold	4	5
(New Zealand) W Ward	6	7
(United States) T Neilly	5	1
(United Kingdom) M Kasiri	7	6
(Chinese Taipei) C-h Yi	6^{1}	3
3	(France) J Ouanna	7^{7}	6

Third round
WC	(Belgium) N Desein	6	3	2
(New Zealand) W Ward	3	6	6
(United Kingdom) M Kasiri	6	5	7
3	(France) J Ouanna	3	7	5

Quarterfinals
(New Zealand) W Ward	4	3
(United Kingdom) M Kasiri	6	6

==== Section 4 ====
First round
6	(Germany) Mischa Zverev	6	6
LL	(Austria) Philipp Oswald	3	4
Q	(Japan) Takanobu Fujii	1	4
Q	(Austria) Martin Fischer	6	6
(Argentina) Juan Martín del Potro	6	7^{8}
WC	(United Kingdom) Nick Cavaday	4	6^{6}
(Slovakia) Peter Miklušičák	3	3
11	(United States) Scoville Jenkins	6	6
13	(Italy) Fabio Fognini	2	3
(South Korea) Jun Woong-sun	6	6
(Serbia and Montenegro) Viktor Troicki	6^{5}	7^{7}	6
(India) Tushar Liberhan	7^{7}	6^{2}	1
(Ukraine) Alexander Nedovesov	6	6
(United States) Vahid Mirzadeh	3	4
Q	(United States) Nikita Kryvonos	6	4	2
2	(United Kingdom) Andy Murray	3	6	6

Second round
6	(Germany) M Zverev	6	2	3
Q	(Austria) M Fischer	1	6	6
(Argentina) JM del Potro	3	4
11	(United States) S Jenkins	6	6
(South Korea) W-s Jun	7^{7}	6
(Serbia and Montenegro) V Troicki	6^{3}	3
(Ukraine) A Nedovesov	2	2
2	(United Kingdom) A Murray	6	6

Third round
Q	(Austria) M Fischer	6^{5}	3
11	(United States) S Jenkins	7^{7}	6
(South Korea) W-s Jun	7	6
2	(United Kingdom) A Murray	5	3

Quarterfinals
11	(United States) S Jenkins	6	6
(South Korea) W-s Jun	3	3
