= 2004 Wimbledon Championships – Mixed doubles =

Mixed doubles
- 2004 Wimbledon Championships

Final
- Champions: (Zimbabwe) Wayne Black (Zimbabwe) Cara Black
- Runners-up: (Australia) Todd Woodbridge (Australia) Alicia Molik
- Score: 3–6, 7–6^{(10–8)}, 6–4

Details
- Draw: 48 (5WC)
- Seeds: 16

Events
Singles	men	women		boys	girls
Doubles	men	women	mixed	boys	girls
WC Singles	men	women	quad
WC Doubles	men	women	quad
Legends	men	women	seniors
- Wimbledon Championships

Leander Paes and Martina Navratilova were the defending champions but lost in the third round to Wayne and Cara Black.

The Blacks defeated Todd Woodbridge and Alicia Molik in the final, 3–6, 7–6^{(10–8)}, 6–4 to win the mixed doubles tennis title at the 2004 Wimbledon Championships.

== Seeds ==
All seeds received a bye into the second round.

1. (India) Mahesh Bhupathi / (Russia) Elena Likhovtseva (quarterfinals)
2. (The Bahamas) Mark Knowles / (Spain) Virginia Ruano Pascual (second round)
3. (United States) Mike Bryan / (United States) Lisa Raymond (second round)
4. (Sweden) Jonas Björkman / (Australia) Rennae Stubbs (quarterfinals)
5. (Australia) Paul Hanley / (Japan) Ai Sugiyama (semifinals)
6. (Zimbabwe) Wayne Black / (Zimbabwe) Cara Black (champions)
7. (United States) Bob Bryan / (United States) Lindsay Davenport (semifinals)
8. (Australia) Todd Woodbridge / (Australia) Alicia Molik (final)
9. (India) Leander Paes / (United States) Martina Navratilova (third round)
10. (Czech Republic) Cyril Suk / (France) Marion Bartoli (second round)
11. (Israel) Jonathan Erlich / (United States) Liezel Huber (third round)
12. (Czech Republic) Leoš Friedl / (Slovakia) Janette Husárová (third round)
13. (Argentina) Mariano Hood / (Venezuela) María Vento-Kabchi (second round)
14. (Argentina) Gastón Etlis / (China) Sun Tiantian (third round)
15. (Canada) Daniel Nestor / (Russia) Lina Krasnoroutskaya (third round)
16. (Argentina) Lucas Arnold Ker / (Indonesia) Angelique Widjaja (second round)

Click on the seed number of a player to go to their draw section.

== Draw ==
Key

- Q = Qualifier
- WC = Wild card
- LL = Lucky loser
- Alt = Alternate
- ITF = ITF entry
- PR = Protected ranking
- SR = Special ranking
- SE = Special exempt
- JE = Junior exempt
- JR = Junior Accelerator Programme entrant
- CO = College Accelerator Programme entrant
- NG = Next Gen Accelerator Program entrant
- w/o = Walkover
- r = Retired
- d = Defaulted

=== Finals ===
Quarterfinals
1	(India) Mahesh Bhupathi (Russia) Elena Likhovtseva	2	4
7	(United States) Bob Bryan (United States) Lindsay Davenport	6	6
(Germany) Rainer Schüttler (Austria) Barbara Schett	4	6^{4}
6	(Zimbabwe) Wayne Black (Zimbabwe) Cara Black	6	7^{7}
5	(Australia) Paul Hanley (Japan) Ai Sugiyama	6	5	6
4	(Sweden) Jonas Björkman (Australia) Rennae Stubbs	4	7	3
8	(Australia) Todd Woodbridge (Australia) Alicia Molik	6	6
(Czech Republic) David Rikl (Czech Republic) Barbora Strýcová	1	4

Semifinals
7	(United States) Bob Bryan (United States) Lindsay Davenport	5	5
6	(Zimbabwe) Wayne Black (Zimbabwe) Cara Black	7	7
5	(Australia) Paul Hanley (Japan) Ai Sugiyama	4	6^{3}
8	(Australia) Todd Woodbridge (Australia) Alicia Molik	6	7^{7}

Final
6	(Zimbabwe) Wayne Black (Zimbabwe) Cara Black	3	7^{10}	6
8	(Australia) Todd Woodbridge (Australia) Alicia Molik	6	6^{8}	4

=== Top half ===
==== Section 1 ====
First round
(South Africa) C Haggard (China) Z Yan	7^{7}	6
(Belgium) T Vanhoudt (Croatia) J Kostanić	6^{2}	4
(Australia) M Hill (Italy) T Garbin	7	5	7
(United States) R Leach (Australia) N Pratt	5	7	5
(Czech Republic) P Vízner (Australia) L McShea	7	6
(Australia) T Perry (Serbia and Montenegro) J Janković	5	2
(Germany) K Braasch (Switzerland) P Schnyder	4	3
(Australia) W Arthurs (Venezuela) M Sequera	6	6

Second round
1	(India) M Bhupathi (Russia) E Likhovtseva	6	7^{7}
(South Africa) C Haggard (China) Z Yan	3	6^{5}
(Australia) M Hill (Italy) T Garbin	2	2
15	(Canada) D Nestor (Russia) L Krasnoroutskaya	6	6
10	(Czech Republic) C Suk (France) M Bartoli	6	3	4
(Czech Republic) P Vízner (Australia) L McShea	4	6	6
(Australia) W Arthurs (Venezuela) M Sequera	4	2
7	(United States) B Bryan (United States) L Davenport	6	6

Third round
1	(India) M Bhupathi (Russia) E Likhovtseva	6	7^{7}
15	(Canada) D Nestor (Russia) L Krasnoroutskaya	3	6^{3}
(Czech Republic) P Vízner (Australia) L McShea	2	3
7	(United States) B Bryan (United States) L Davenport	6	6

Quarterfinals
1	(India) M Bhupathi (Russia) E Likhovtseva	2	4
7	(United States) B Bryan (United States) L Davenport	6	6

==== Section 2 ====
First round
(Georgia (country)) I Labadze (Ukraine) T Perebiynis	6	2	2
(Germany) R Schüttler (Austria) B Schett	2	6	6
Alt	(Slovakia) D Hrbatý (Slovakia) H Nagyová	3	4
WC	(Israel) A Ram (Russia) A Rodionova	6	6
(Argentina) S Prieto (Switzerland) E Gagliardi	6	6
WC	(United Kingdom) A Parmar (United Kingdom) J O'Donoghue	3	4
(Zimbabwe) K Ullyett (Slovakia) D Hantuchová	6	7^{7}
WC	(United States) J Palmer (Spain) A Sánchez Vicario	2	6^{3}

Second round
3	(United States) M Bryan (United States) L Raymond	6	4	4
(Germany) R Schüttler (Austria) B Schett	3	6	6
WC	(Israel) A Ram (Russia) A Rodionova	6	6
13	(Argentina) M Hood (Venezuela) M Vento-Kabchi	4	4
9	(India) L Paes (United States) M Navratilova	6	6
(Argentina) S Prieto (Switzerland) E Gagliardi	1	3
(Zimbabwe) K Ullyett (Slovakia) D Hantuchová	4	2
6	(Zimbabwe) W Black (Zimbabwe) C Black	6	6

Third round
(Germany) R Schüttler (Austria) B Schett	7^{7}	3	6
WC	(Israel) A Ram (Russia) A Rodionova	6^{4}	6	4
9	(India) L Paes (United States) M Navratilova	6^{7}	7^{7}	11
6	(Zimbabwe) W Black (Zimbabwe) C Black	7^{9}	6^{5}	13

Quarterfinals
(Germany) R Schüttler (Austria) B Schett	4	6^{4}
6	(Zimbabwe) W Black (Zimbabwe) C Black	6	7^{7}

=== Bottom half ===
==== Section 3 ====
First round
(United States) S Humphries (United States) J Capriati	6	6
(Czech Republic) P Pála (Ukraine) E Tatarkova	2	2
Alt	(South Africa) J Coetzee (Slovenia) T Križan	5	6	3
Alt	(Poland) M Matkowski (United States) M Washington	7	4	6
(Argentina) JI Chela (Argentina) G Dulko	6	6
(Czech Republic) T Cibulec (United States) A Spears	4	2
(Belgium) O Rochus (United States) M Tu	6	6
WC	(United Kingdom) D Sherwood (United Kingdom) A Keothavong	4	0

Second round
5	(Australia) P Hanley (Japan) A Sugiyama	6	6
(United States) S Humphries (United States) J Capriati	4	2
Alt	(Poland) M Matkowski (United States) M Washington	6	6^{3}	7
11	(Israel) J Erlich (United States) L Huber	3	7^{7}	9
14	(Argentina) G Etlis (China) T Sun	6	7
(Argentina) JI Chela (Argentina) G Dulko	3	5
(Belgium) O Rochus (United States) M Tu	w/o
4	(Sweden) J Björkman (Australia) R Stubbs

Third round
5	(Australia) P Hanley (Japan) A Sugiyama	6	6
11	(Israel) J Erlich (United States) L Huber	4	4
14	(Argentina) G Etlis (China) T Sun	2	6	2
4	(Sweden) J Björkman (Australia) R Stubbs	6	4	6

Quarterfinals
5	(Australia) P Hanley (Japan) A Sugiyama	6	5	6
4	(Sweden) J Björkman (Australia) R Stubbs	4	7	3

==== Section 4 ====
First round
(Switzerland) Y Allegro (Switzerland) M Casanova	6	6
(The Bahamas) M Merklein (Spain) M Serna	4	2
WC	(United Kingdom) J Marray (United Kingdom) A Janes	6	6
(Argentina) M García (Luxembourg) C Schaul	4	4
(Czech Republic) D Rikl (Czech Republic) B Strýcová	6	6
(Czech Republic) M Damm (Czech Republic) L Průšová	1	3
(Germany) M Kohlmann (Austria) P Wartusch	2	6^{0}
(South Africa) R Koenig (Belgium) E Callens	6	7^{7}

Second round
8	(Australia) T Woodbridge (Australia) A Molik	6	6
(Switzerland) Y Allegro (Switzerland) M Casanova	3	2
WC	(United Kingdom) J Marray (United Kingdom) A Janes	3	4
12	(Czech Republic) L Friedl (Slovakia) J Husárová	6	6
16	(Argentina) L Arnold Ker (Indonesia) A Widjaja	6^{4}	5
(Czech Republic) D Rikl (Czech Republic) B Strýcová	7^{7}	7
(South Africa) R Koenig (Belgium) E Callens	6	6
2	(The Bahamas) M Knowles (Spain) V Ruano Pascual	3	2

Third round
8	(Australia) T Woodbridge (Australia) A Molik	4	7^{7}	6
12	(Czech Republic) L Friedl (Slovakia) J Husárová	6	6^{5}	4
(Czech Republic) D Rikl (Czech Republic) B Strýcová	6	6
(South Africa) R Koenig (Belgium) E Callens	4	4

Quarterfinals
8	(Australia) T Woodbridge (Australia) A Molik	6	6
(Czech Republic) D Rikl (Czech Republic) B Strýcová	1	4
