= 2004 Wimbledon Championships – Women's doubles =

Women's doubles
- 2004 Wimbledon Championships

Final
- Champions: (Zimbabwe) Cara Black (Australia) Rennae Stubbs
- Runners-up: (South Africa) Liezel Huber (Japan) Ai Sugiyama
- Score: 6–3, 7–6^{(7–5)}

Details
- Draw: 64 (4 Q / 6 WC )
- Seeds: 16

Events
Singles	men	women		boys	girls
Doubles	men	women	mixed	boys	girls
WC Singles	men	women	quad
WC Doubles	men	women	quad
Legends	men	women	seniors
← 2003 ·	Wimbledon Championships	· 2005 →

Kim Clijsters and Ai Sugiyama were the defending champions, however Clijsters did not compete.

Cara Black and Rennae Stubbs defeated Sugiyama and Liezel Huber in the final, 6–3, 7–6^{(7–5)} to win the ladies' doubles tennis title at the 2004 Wimbledon Championships.

Virginia Ruano Pascual and Paola Suárez had the chance to hold all four Grand Slam championship titles, but lost to Black and Stubbs in the semifinals, also snapping a streak of nine straight Grand Slam finals reached by Ruano Pascual and Suárez.

== Seeds ==
1. (Spain) Virginia Ruano Pascual / (Argentina) Paola Suárez (semifinals)
2. (Russia) Svetlana Kuznetsova / (Russia) Elena Likhovtseva (quarterfinals)
3. (United States) Martina Navratilova / (United States) Lisa Raymond (semifinals)
4. (Russia) Nadia Petrova / (United States) Meghann Shaughnessy (quarterfinals)
5. (South Africa) Liezel Huber / (Japan) Ai Sugiyama (final)
6. (Zimbabwe) Cara Black / (Australia) Rennae Stubbs (champions)
7. (Slovakia) Janette Husárová / (Spain) Conchita Martínez (third round)
8. (Venezuela) María Vento-Kabchi / (Indonesia) Angelique Widjaja (quarterfinals)
9. (Switzerland) Myriam Casanova / (Australia) Nicole Pratt (second round)
10. n/a
11. (France) Marion Bartoli / (France) Émilie Loit (quarterfinals)
12. (China) Li Ting / (China) Sun Tiantian (first round)
13. (Russia) Anastasia Myskina / (Russia) Vera Zvonareva (second round, withdrew)
14. (Italy) Silvia Farina Elia / (Italy) Francesca Schiavone (second round, withdrew)
15. (Belgium) Els Callens / (Hungary) Petra Mandula (third round)
16. (Switzerland) Emmanuelle Gagliardi / (Italy) Roberta Vinci (third round)
17. (Australia) Alicia Molik / (Spain) Magüi Serna (second round)

Click on the seed number of a player to go to their draw section.

== Draw ==
=== Key ===
- Q = Qualifier
- WC = Wild card
- LL = Lucky loser
- Alt = Alternate
- SE = Special exempt
- PR = Protected ranking
- ITF = ITF entry
- JE = Junior exempt
- w/o = Walkover
- r = Retired
- d = Defaulted
- SR = Special ranking

=== Finals ===
Quarterfinals
1	(Spain) Virginia Ruano Pascual (Argentina) Paola Suárez	5	6	6
8	(Venezuela) María Vento-Kabchi (Indonesia) Angelique Widjaja	7	4	3
4	(Russia) Nadia Petrova (United States) Meghann Shaughnessy	4	3
6	(Zimbabwe) Cara Black (Australia) Rennae Stubbs	6	6
11	(France) Marion Bartoli (France) Émilie Loit	2	4
3	(United States) Martina Navratilova (United States) Lisa Raymond	6	6
5	(South Africa) Liezel Huber (Japan) Ai Sugiyama	7^{7}	6
2	(Russia) Svetlana Kuznetsova (Russia) Elena Likhovtseva	6^{0}	3

Semifinals
1	(Spain) Virginia Ruano Pascual (Argentina) Paola Suárez	6^{7}	6	4
6	(Zimbabwe) Cara Black (Australia) Rennae Stubbs	7^{9}	4	6
3	(United States) Martina Navratilova (United States) Lisa Raymond	6^{4}	5
5	(South Africa) Liezel Huber (Japan) Ai Sugiyama	7^{7}	7

Final
6	(Zimbabwe) Cara Black (Australia) Rennae Stubbs	6	7^{7}
5	(South Africa) Liezel Huber (Japan) Ai Sugiyama	3	6^{5}

=== Top half ===
==== Section 1 ====
First round
1	(Spain) V Ruano Pascual (Argentina) P Suárez	6	6
LL	(United States) A Augustus (South Africa) N Grandin	2	2
(Czech Republic) O Blahotová (Czech Republic) G Navrátilová	6	3	3
(Japan) S Asagoe (Japan) R Fujiwara	4	6	6
Q	(Bulgaria) L Bacheva (Czech Republic) E Birnerová	3	1
(Argentina) G Dulko (Argentina) P Tarabini	6	6
(Czech Republic) I Benešová (Czech Republic) M Paštiková	2	4
14	(Italy) S Farina Elia (Italy) F Schiavone	6	6
17	(Australia) A Molik (Spain) M Serna	6	7
Q	(New Zealand) L Baker (Australia) N Sewell	3	5
WC	(United Kingdom) E Baltacha (United Kingdom) A Janes	3	2
WC	(France) T Golovin (France) M Pierce	6	6
(Indonesia) W Prakusya (Thailand) T Tanasugarn	6	6
(Australia) L McShea (Venezuela) M Sequera	1	3
(Sweden) Å Svensson (United States) M Tu	4	2
8	(Venezuela) M Vento-Kabchi (Indonesia) A Widjaja	6	6

Second round
1	(Spain) V Ruano Pascual (Argentina) P Suárez	7^{7}	6
(Japan) S Asagoe (Japan) R Fujiwara	6^{2}	1
(Argentina) G Dulko (Argentina) P Tarabini
14	(Italy) S Farina Elia (Italy) F Schiavone	w/o
17	(Australia) A Molik (Spain) M Serna	6^{5}	7^{7}	3
WC	(France) T Golovin (France) M Pierce	7^{7}	6^{5}	6
(Indonesia) W Prakusya (Thailand) T Tanasugarn	4	6	14
8	(Venezuela) M Vento-Kabchi (Indonesia) A Widjaja	6	3	16

Third round
1	(Spain) V Ruano Pascual (Argentina) P Suárez	6	3	6
(Argentina) G Dulko (Argentina) P Tarabini	3	6	3
WC	(France) T Golovin (France) M Pierce	6	6^{3}	1
8	(Venezuela) M Vento-Kabchi (Indonesia) A Widjaja	3	7^{7}	6

Quarterfinals
1	(Spain) V Ruano Pascual (Argentina) P Suárez	5	6	6
8	(Venezuela) M Vento-Kabchi (Indonesia) A Widjaja	7	4	3

==== Section 2 ====
First round
4	(Russia) N Petrova (United States) M Shaughnessy	6	6
(France) C Dhenin (Russia) E Kulikovskaya	2	3
(Japan) N Miyagi (United States) M Washington	6	4	2
(Croatia) J Kostanić (Chinese Taipei) J Lee	3	6	6
(Estonia) M Ani (Croatia) S Talaja	4	6	4
(United States) A Cargill (Australia) C Wheeler	6	3	6
(United States) T Ashley (United States) S Perry	4	4
15	(Belgium) E Callens (Hungary) P Mandula	6	6
12	(China) T Li (China) T Sun	2	3
Q	(Australia) E Dominikovic (Russia) A Rodionova	6	6
(Bosnia and Herzegovina) M Jugić-Salkić (Croatia) D Jurak	2	6	2
(Austria) B Schett (Switzerland) P Schnyder	6	4	6
(Slovakia) L Kurhajcová (Czech Republic) L Průšová	4	3
(Italy) T Garbin (Slovenia) T Križan	6	6
(United States) J Hopkins (United States) A Spears	2	3
6	(Zimbabwe) C Black (Australia) R Stubbs	6	6

Second round
4	(Russia) N Petrova (United States) M Shaughnessy	6	6
(Croatia) J Kostanić (Chinese Taipei) J Lee	2	2
(United States) A Cargill (Australia) C Wheeler	4	3
15	(Belgium) E Callens (Hungary) P Mandula	6	6
Q	(Australia) E Dominikovic (Russia) A Rodionova	1	4
(Austria) B Schett (Switzerland) P Schnyder	6	6
(Italy) T Garbin (Slovenia) T Križan	6^{3}	3
6	(Zimbabwe) C Black (Australia) R Stubbs	7^{7}	6

Third round
4	(Russia) N Petrova (United States) M Shaughnessy	6	6
15	(Belgium) E Callens (Hungary) P Mandula	3	0
(Austria) B Schett (Switzerland) P Schnyder	6^{5}	4
6	(Zimbabwe) C Black (Australia) R Stubbs	7^{7}	6

Quarterfinals
4	(Russia) N Petrova (United States) M Shaughnessy	4	3
6	(Zimbabwe) C Black (Australia) R Stubbs	6	6

=== Bottom half ===
==== Section 3 ====
First round
7	(Slovakia) J Husárová (Spain) C Martínez	6	6
WC	(Spain) A Medina Garrigues (Spain) A Sánchez Vicario	2	2
(Germany) B Rittner (Austria) P Wartusch	5	6	3
(Italy) R Grande (Italy) F Pennetta	7	3	6
(Republic of Ireland) K Liggan (Spain) A Parra Santonja	4	6	5
LL	(Austria) B Schwartz (Germany) J Wöhr	6	4	7
(Italy) ME Camerin (Russia) A Jidkova	4	1
11	(France) M Bartoli (France) É Loit	6	6
13	(Russia) A Myskina (Russia) V Zvonareva	6	6
(United States) S Reeves (Ukraine) E Tatarkova	4	2
(United States) J Russell (Italy) M Santangelo	6	5	6
(Greece) E Daniilidou (Slovenia) K Srebotnik	2	7	4
(Australia) B Stewart (Australia) S Stosur	6	6
(Czech Republic) D Chládková (Slovakia) H Nagyová	3	4
(United States) J Craybas (Germany) M Weingärtner	2	4
3	(United States) M Navratilova (United States) L Raymond	6	6

Second round
7	(Slovakia) J Husárová (Spain) C Martínez	3	6	6
(Italy) R Grande (Italy) F Pennetta	6	1	1
LL	(Austria) B Schwartz (Germany) J Wöhr	1	3
11	(France) M Bartoli (France) É Loit	6	6
13	(Russia) A Myskina (Russia) V Zvonareva	w/o
(United States) J Russell (Italy) M Santangelo
(Australia) B Stewart (Australia) S Stosur	3	1
3	(United States) M Navratilova (United States) L Raymond	6	6

Third round
7	(Slovakia) J Husárová (Spain) C Martínez	4	6	4
11	(France) M Bartoli (France) É Loit	6	3	6
(United States) J Russell (Italy) M Santangelo	5	3
3	(United States) M Navratilova (United States) L Raymond	7	6

Quarterfinals
11	(France) M Bartoli (France) É Loit	2	4
3	(United States) M Navratilova (United States) L Raymond	6	6

==== Section 4 ====
First round
5	(South Africa) L Huber (Japan) A Sugiyama	6	7
WC	(United Kingdom) H Crook (United Kingdom) A Hawkins	1	5
WC	(United Kingdom) H Collin (United Kingdom) A Keothavong	3	0
(United States) J Lehnhoff (United States) B Mattek	6	6
(Hungary) Z Gubacsi (Hungary) K Nagy	6^{10}	6^{5}
(China) Z Yan (China) J Zheng	7^{12}	7^{7}
(Italy) Ad Serra Zanetti (Italy) An Serra Zanetti	1	2
9	(Switzerland) M Casanova (Australia) N Pratt	6	6
16	(Switzerland) E Gagliardi (Italy) R Vinci	3	7	6
Q	(South Korea) M-r Jeon (Japan) Y Yoshida	6	5	4
(Ukraine) Y Beygelzimer (Belarus) T Poutchek	6	6
LL	(Republic of Ireland) C Curran (United Kingdom) J O'Donoghue	2	4
(France) N Dechy (Slovakia) D Hantuchová	6	6
WC	(United Kingdom) S Borwell (United Kingdom) E Webley-Smith	4	1
(South Korea) Y-j Cho (United States) L Granville	1	3
2	(Russia) S Kuznetsova (Russia) E Likhovtseva	6	6

Second round
5	(South Africa) L Huber (Japan) A Sugiyama	6	6
(United States) J Lehnhoff (United States) B Mattek	3	4
(China) Z Yan (China) J Zheng	6	4	6
9	(Switzerland) M Casanova (Australia) N Pratt	4	6	4
16	(Switzerland) E Gagliardi (Italy) R Vinci	6	6
(Ukraine) Y Beygelzimer (Belarus) T Poutchek	3	3
(France) N Dechy (Slovakia) D Hantuchová	3	2
2	(Russia) S Kuznetsova (Russia) E Likhovtseva	6	6

Third round
5	(South Africa) L Huber (Japan) A Sugiyama	6	7
(China) Z Yan (China) J Zheng	1	5
16	(Switzerland) E Gagliardi (Italy) R Vinci	6	3	2
3	(Russia) S Kuznetsova (Russia) E Likhovtseva	2	6	6

Quarterfinals
5	(South Africa) L Huber (Japan) A Sugiyama	7^{7}	6
3	(Russia) S Kuznetsova (Russia) E Likhovtseva	6^{0}	3
