= 2005 US Open – Men's singles qualifying =

Men's singles qualifying
- 2005 US Open

Events
Singles	men	women		boys	girls
Doubles	men	women	mixed	boys	girls
WC Singles	men	women	quad
WC Doubles	men	women	quad
Legends	men	women	mixed

Qualification
Singles	men	women
- US Open

The 2005 US Open men's singles qualifying was the qualifying competition for the 2005 US Open men's singles. Sixteen players qualified for the main draw.

== Seeds ==
1. (Czech Republic) Robin Vik (qualified)
2. (Italy) Daniele Bracciali (qualified)
3. (France) Arnaud Clément (qualified)
4. (Czech Republic) Lukáš Dlouhý (second round)
5. (France) Thierry Ascione (first round)
6. (Brazil) Flávio Saretta (second round)
7. (Germany) Björn Phau (qualifying competition; lucky loser)
8. (France) Gilles Simon (first round)
9. (South Africa) Wesley Moodie (qualified)
10. (Sweden) Jonas Björkman (qualified)
11. (Czech Republic) Michal Tabara (second round)
12. (Germany) Alexander Waske (first round)
13. (Switzerland) George Bastl (qualified)
14. (France) Antony Dupuis (qualifying competition)
15. (United Kingdom) Andy Murray (qualified)
16. (Chinese Taipei) Wang Yeu-tzuoo (second round)
17. (Belgium) Kristof Vliegen (first round)
18. (Monaco) Jean-René Lisnard (qualifying competition)
19. (Chinese Taipei) Lu Yen-hsun (qualifying competition)
20. (Germany) Simon Greul (first round)
21. (Thailand) Danai Udomchoke (qualifying competition)
22. (Ecuador) Giovanni Lapentti (qualifying competition)
23. (Croatia) Roko Karanušić (first round)
24. (Slovakia) Michal Mertiňák (qualifying competition)
25. (France) Julien Benneteau (qualifying competition)
26. (Spain) Álex Calatrava (first round)
27. (France) Olivier Patience (second round)
28. (Brazil) Marcos Daniel (second round)
29. (Brazil) André Sá (first round)
30. (Argentina) Juan Pablo Brzezicki (qualifying competition)
31. (Croatia) Saša Tuksar (second round)
32. (United States) Amer Delic (second round)

== Qualifiers ==
1. (Czech Republic) Robin Vik
2. (Italy) Daniele Bracciali
3. (France) Arnaud Clément
4. (Belgium) Gilles Elseneer
5. (Australia) Peter Luczak
6. (Germany) Tobias Summerer
7. (Chile) Paul Capdeville
8. (United States) Glenn Weiner
9. (South Africa) Wesley Moodie
10. (Sweden) Jonas Björkman
11. (Switzerland) Michael Lammer
12. (United States) Alex Bogomolov Jr.
13. (Switzerland) George Bastl
14. (Italy) Giorgio Galimberti
15. (United Kingdom) Andy Murray
16. (Israel) Noam Okun

== Lucky loser ==
1. (Germany) Björn Phau

== Qualifying draw ==
Key

- Q = Qualifier
- WC = Wild card
- LL = Lucky loser
- Alt = Alternate
- ITF = ITF entry
- PR = Protected ranking
- SR = Special ranking
- SE = Special exempt
- JE = Junior exempt
- JR = Junior Accelerator Programme entrant
- CO = College Accelerator Programme entrant
- NG = Next Gen Accelerator Program entrant
- w/o = Walkover
- r = Retired
- d = Defaulted

=== First qualifier ===
First round
1	(Czech Republic) Robin Vik	6	7
(Australia) Nathan Healey	2	5
WC	(United States) Travis Rettenmaier	6	6
(Netherlands Antilles) Jean-Julien Rojer	3	4
(South Africa) Rik de Voest	6	6
(Mexico) Santiago González	0	3
(United Kingdom) David Sherwood	6	6^{5}	1
31	(Croatia) Saša Tuksar	3	7^{7}	6

Second round
1	(Czech Republic) Robin Vik	7	6
WC	(United States) Travis Rettenmaier	5	2
(South Africa) Rik de Voest	7^{7}	3	6
31	(Croatia) Saša Tuksar	6^{5}	6	2

Qualifying competition
1	(Czech Republic) Robin Vik	3	6	6
(South Africa) Rik de Voest	6	2	3

=== Second qualifier ===
First round
2	(Italy) Daniele Bracciali	6	6
(Russia) Teymuraz Gabashvili	4	4
(Israel) Harel Levy	6	6
(Serbia and Montenegro) Dušan Vemic	4	2
(Germany) Michael Berrer	7^{7}	7
(Belarus) Vladimir Voltchkov	6^{5}	5
(Denmark) Kristian Pless	6	6
23	(Croatia) Roko Karanušić	4	2

Second round
2	(Italy) Daniele Bracciali	5	6	7^{7}
(Israel) Harel Levy	7	4	6^{3}
(Germany) Michael Berrer	6	6
(Denmark) Kristian Pless	1	4

Qualifying competition
2	(Italy) Daniele Bracciali	7^{7}	7^{7}
(Germany) Michael Berrer	6^{3}	6^{2}

=== Third qualifier ===
First round
3	(France) Arnaud Clément	6	6
Alt	(Chinese Taipei) Chen Ti	4	2
(Ukraine) Sergiy Stakhovsky	5	6	6
(France) Grégory Carraz	7	3	4
(Netherlands) Dennis van Scheppingen	7^{7}	7^{7}
(France) Nicolas Devilder	6^{3}	6^{4}
(Italy) Tomas Tenconi	4	4
21	(Thailand) Danai Udomchoke	6	6

Second round
3	(France) Arnaud Clément	1	6	6
(Ukraine) Sergiy Stakhovsky	6	4	4
(Netherlands) Dennis van Scheppingen	5	6^{4}
(Thailand) Danai Udomchoke	7	7^{7}

Qualifying competition
3	(France) Arnaud Clément	0	7	7^{7}
21	(Thailand) Danai Udomchoke	6	5	6^{4}

=== Fourth qualifier ===
First round
4	(Czech Republic) Lukáš Dlouhý	6	6
(Sweden) Marcus Sarstrand	3	4
(Belgium) Gilles Elseneer	6	6
(France) Jean-Michel Pequery	3	0
(India) Prakash Amritraj	7^{7}	6
(France) Nicolas Mahut	6^{4}	4
WC	(United States) Brendan Evans	4	4
24	(Slovakia) Michal Mertiňák	6	6

Second round
4	(Czech Republic) Lukáš Dlouhý	3	3
(Belgium) Gilles Elseneer	6	6
(India) Prakash Amritraj	3	1
24	(Slovakia) Michal Mertiňák	6	6

Qualifying competition
(Belgium) Gilles Elseneer	6	2	6
24	(Slovakia) Michal Mertiňák	4	6	4

=== Fifth qualifier ===
First round
5	(France) Thierry Ascione	6	3	2
(United Kingdom) Jonathan Marray	4	6	6
(Brazil) Thiago Alves	6	4	6
(Argentina) Cristian Villagrán	4	6	3
(Chile) Adrián García	6	6
(Brazil) Júlio Silva	4	0
(Australia) Peter Luczak	6	6
17	(Belgium) Kristof Vliegen	4	2

Second round
(United Kingdom) Jonathan Marray	4	2
(Brazil) Thiago Alves	6	6
(Chile) Adrián García	5	6	2
(Australia) Peter Luczak	7	4	6

Qualifying competition
(Brazil) Thiago Alves	1	4
(Australia) Peter Luczak	6	6

=== Sixth qualifier ===
First round
6	(Brazil) Flávio Saretta	6	6
(Mexico) Miguel Gallardo	1	1
(Germany) Tobias Summerer	4	6	6
(Italy) Federico Luzzi	6	1	1
WC	(United States) Zack Fleishman	6	7
(Argentina) Nicolás Todero	1	5
(United States) Brian Vahaly	7	2	2
19	(Chinese Taipei) Lu Yen-hsun	5	6	6

Second round
6	(Brazil) Flávio Saretta	6	3	5
(Germany) Tobias Summerer	2	6	7
WC	(United States) Zack Fleishman	6	4	4
19	(Chinese Taipei) Lu Yen-hsun	4	6	6

Qualifying competition
(Germany) Tobias Summerer	6	6
19	(Chinese Taipei) Lu Yen-hsun	3	1

=== Seventh qualifier ===
First round
7	(Germany) Björn Phau	6	6
WC	(United States) Jesse Levine	4	2
(Poland) Łukasz Kubot	7^{7}	6
(Australia) Chris Guccione	6^{5}	2
(Chile) Paul Capdeville	7^{7}	6
(Russia) Yuri Schukin	6^{5}	3
(United States) Alex Clayton	4	4
28	(Brazil) Marcos Daniel	6	6

Second round
7	(Germany) Björn Phau	6	7
(Poland) Łukasz Kubot	4	5
(Chile) Paul Capdeville	6	6
28	(Brazil) Marcos Daniel	4	3

Qualifying competition
7	(Germany) Björn Phau	4	5
(Chile) Paul Capdeville	6	7

=== Eighth qualifier ===
First round
8	(France) Gilles Simon	6	4	5
(Peru) Iván Miranda	4	6	7
(France) Sébastien de Chaunac	5	6	1
(United States) Glenn Weiner	7	4	6
(United Kingdom) Arvind Parmar	6	6
(Poland) Adam Chadaj	3	0
(United States) Hugo Armando	6	6
26	(Spain) Álex Calatrava	3	4

Second round
(Peru) Iván Miranda	7^{7}	2	6^{2}
(United States) Glenn Weiner	6^{3}	6	7^{7}
(United Kingdom) Arvind Parmar	3	4
(United States) Hugo Armando	6	6

Qualifying match
(United States) Glenn Weiner	6^{5}	6	6
(United States) Hugo Armando	7^{7}	3	4

=== Ninth qualifier ===
First round
9	(South Africa) Wesley Moodie	6	6
(Belgium) Jeroen Masson	2	2
(France) Édouard Roger-Vasselin	7	6
(Czech Republic) Pavel Šnobel	5	3
(Austria) Zbynek Mlynarik	4	7^{7}	6^{2}
(Canada) Frank Dancevic	6	6^{5}	7^{7}
(Japan) Takao Suzuki	3	3
18	(Monaco) Jean-René Lisnard	6	6

Second round
9	(South Africa) Wesley Moodie	6	7
(France) Édouard Roger-Vasselin	2	5
(Canada) Frank Dancevic	6	4	2
18	(Monaco) Jean-René Lisnard	1	6	6

Qualifying match
9	(South Africa) Wesley Moodie	6^{1}	6	6
18	(Monaco) Jean-René Lisnard	7^{7}	1	1

=== Tenth qualifier ===
First round
10	(Sweden) Jonas Björkman	6	7
(Argentina) Diego Hartfield	3	5
(Paraguay) Ramón Delgado	6	6
(Argentina) Juan Martín del Potro	3	2
(Italy) Stefano Galvani	7	6
(Sweden) Filip Prpic	5	3
(Australia) Marc Kimmich	2^{r}
27	(France) Olivier Patience	5

Second round
10	(Sweden) Jonas Björkman	6	6
(Paraguay) Ramón Delgado	4	3
(Italy) Stefano Galvani	6	6
27	(France) Olivier Patience	3	3

Qualifying competition
10	(Sweden) Jonas Björkman	6	6^{7}	6
(Italy) Stefano Galvani	1	7^{9}	0

=== Eleventh qualifier ===
First round
11	(Czech Republic) Michal Tabara	7	7^{7}
(Colombia) Alejandro Falla	5	6^{1}
(Switzerland) Michael Lammer	6	6
WC	(United States) John Paul Fruttero	2	4
WC	(United States) Wayne Odesnik	6	6
(Netherlands) Melvyn op der Heijde	4	3
(Germany) Denis Gremelmayr	6	6
20	(Germany) Simon Greul	4	1

Second round
11	(Czech Republic) Michal Tabara	6^{6}	6	5
(Switzerland) Michael Lammer	7^{8}	2	7
WC	(United States) Wayne Odesnik	2	3
(Germany) Denis Gremelmayr	6	6

Qualifying match
(Switzerland) Michael Lammer	6	6
(Germany) Denis Gremelmayr	4	2

=== Twelfth qualifier ===
First round
12	(Germany) Alexander Waske	4	6^{11}
(United States) Alex Bogomolov Jr.	6	7^{13}
(United States) Cecil Mamiit	6	7^{8}
(Czech Republic) Tomáš Cakl	2	6^{6}
(India) Harsh Mankad	6	6
WC	(United States) Tim Smyczek	3	2
(United Kingdom) Mark Hilton	4	5
25	(France) Julien Benneteau	6	7

Second round
(United States) Alex Bogomolov Jr.	3	6	7
(United States) Cecil Mamiit	6	2	5
(India) Harsh Mankad	3	6	4
25	(France) Julien Benneteau	6	3	6

Qualifying match
(United States) Alex Bogomolov Jr.	7^{7}	7
25	(France) Julien Benneteau	6^{5}	5

=== Thirteenth qualifier ===
First round
13	(Switzerland) George Bastl	6	1	7^{7}
(Argentina) Sergio Roitman	3	6	6^{5}
(Switzerland) Ivo Heuberger	3	6	6
(Sweden) Björn Rehnquist	6	2	1
(Argentina) Franco Squillari	6	6
(Australia) Robert Smeets	2	4
(France) Marc Gicquel	3	6	1
30	(Argentina) Juan Pablo Brzezicki	6	1	6

Second round
13	(Switzerland) George Bastl	6	2	6
(Switzerland) Ivo Heuberger	4	6	4
(Argentina) Franco Squillari	4	6	6^{5}
30	(Argentina) Juan Pablo Brzezicki	6	1	7^{7}

Qualifying match
13	(Switzerland) George Bastl	2	6	6
30	(Argentina) Juan Pablo Brzezicki	6	2	3

=== Fourteenth qualifier ===
First round
14	(France) Antony Dupuis	6	7^{7}
WC	(United States) Sam Querrey	4	6^{4}
(Italy) Andrea Stoppini	7^{7}	6
(United States) Jeff Morrison	6^{2}	2
(Italy) Simone Bolelli	7^{8}	7^{7}
(Brazil) Franco Ferreiro	6^{6}	6^{4}
(Italy) Giorgio Galimberti	5	7	6
29	(Brazil) André Sá	7	5	2

Second round
14	(France) Antony Dupuis	4	7^{7}	7^{7}
(Italy) Andrea Stoppini	6	6^{2}	6^{4}
(Italy) Simone Bolelli	4	4
(Italy) Giorgio Galimberti	6	6

Qualifying match
14	(France) Antony Dupuis	6^{6}	6^{2}
(Italy) Giorgio Galimberti	7^{8}	7^{7}

=== Fifteenth qualifier ===
First round
15	(United Kingdom) Andy Murray	6	6
(Israel) Dudi Sela	4	4
(Italy) Paolo Lorenzi	6	7^{7}
(Sweden) Jacob Adaktusson	2	6^{2}
(Russia) Igor Kunitsyn	6	4
(Slovakia) Viktor Bruthans	4	1^{r}
(Romania) Florin Mergea	7	3	4
22	(Ecuador) Giovanni Lapentti	5	6	6

Second round
15	(United Kingdom) Andy Murray	6	6
(Italy) Paolo Lorenzi	3	2
(Russia) Igor Kunitsyn	6	3	3
22	(Ecuador) Giovanni Lapentti	3	6	6

Qualifying match
15	(United Kingdom) Andy Murray	6	7^{7}
22	(Ecuador) Giovanni Lapentti	0	6^{5}

=== Sixteenth qualifier ===
First round
16	(Chinese Taipei) Wang Yeu-tzuoo	6	6
(United Kingdom) Jamie Delgado	3	3
(Israel) Noam Okun	6	1	6
(Canada) Frédéric Niemeyer	4	6	1
(Austria) Alexander Peya	6	3	6
(Czech Republic) Jan Vacek	1	6	1
(United Kingdom) Alex Bogdanovic	4	6^{7}
32	(United States) Amer Delic	6	7^{9}

Second round
16	(Chinese Taipei) Wang Yeu-tzuoo	3	6	4
(Israel) Noam Okun	6	1	6
(Austria) Alexander Peya	6	3	7^{9}
32	(United States) Amer Delic	4	6	6^{7}

Qualifying match
(Israel) Noam Okun	6	6^{7}	6
(Austria) Alexander Peya	4	7^{9}	2
