= 2005 US Open – Women's singles qualifying =

Women's singles qualifying
- 2005 US Open

Events
Singles	men	women		boys	girls
Doubles	men	women	mixed	boys	girls
WC Singles	men	women	quad
WC Doubles	men	women	quad
Legends	men	women	mixed

Qualification
Singles	men	women
- US Open

This article displays the qualifying draw for the Women's Singles at the 2005 US Open.

== Seeds ==
1. (Austria) Sybille Bammer (qualified)
2. (Spain) Lourdes Domínguez Lino (first round)
3. (Spain) María Sánchez Lorenzo (qualifying competition, lucky loser)
4. (Bulgaria) Tsvetana Pironkova (second round)
5. (Sweden) Sofia Arvidsson (first round)
6. (Czech Republic) Hana Šromová (second round)
7. (Germany) Sandra Klösel (qualified)
8. (Spain) Virginia Ruano Pascual (qualified)
9. (Switzerland) Emmanuelle Gagliardi (qualifying competition, lucky loser)
10. (Russia) Tatiana Panova (qualifying competition)
11. (Belarus) Anastasiya Yakimova (qualifying competition)
12. (Australia) Evie Dominikovic (first round)
13. (Israel) Tzipora Obziler (first round)
14. (Canada) Marie-Ève Pelletier (first round)
15. (France) Stéphanie Foretz (qualified)
16. (Uzbekistan) Varvara Lepchenko (first round)
17. (Finland) Emma Laine (qualified)
18. (India) Shikha Uberoi (qualifying competition)
19. (Hungary) Melinda Czink (first round)
20. (Estonia) Maret Ani (first round)
21. (Argentina) María Emilia Salerni (qualified)
22. (Spain) Marta Marrero (first round)
23. (Slovakia) Ľudmila Cervanová (qualifying competition)
24. (Russia) Galina Voskoboeva (second round)
25. (Ukraine) Viktoriya Kutuzova (qualified)
26. (Austria) Yvonne Meusburger (second round)
27. (United Kingdom) Elena Baltacha (first round)
28. (Germany) Martina Müller (qualified)
29. (Germany) Sabine Klaschka (first round)
30. (Romania) Edina Gallovits (qualifying competition)
31. (United States) Meilen Tu (second round)
32. (Brazil) Maria-Fernanda Alves (qualifying competition)

== Qualifiers ==
1. (Austria) Sybille Bammer
2. (Croatia) Ivana Lisjak
3. (Finland) Emma Laine
4. (United States) Tiffany Dabek
5. (China) Sun Tiantian
6. (Chinese Taipei) Hsieh Su-wei
7. (Germany) Sandra Klösel
8. (Spain) Virginia Ruano Pascual
9. (Ukraine) Viktoriya Kutuzova
10. (France) Pauline Parmentier
11. (Argentina) María Emilia Salerni
12. (Germany) Martina Müller
13. (Luxembourg) Anne Kremer
14. (Chinese Taipei) Chan Yung-jan
15. (France) Stéphanie Foretz
16. (United States) Vania King

== Lucky losers ==
1. (Spain) María Sánchez Lorenzo
2. (Switzerland) Emmanuelle Gagliardi

== Qualifying draw ==
Key

- Q = Qualifier
- WC = Wild card
- LL = Lucky loser
- Alt = Alternate
- ITF = ITF entry
- PR = Protected ranking
- SR = Special ranking
- SE = Special exempt
- JE = Junior exempt
- JR = Junior Accelerator Programme entrant
- CO = College Accelerator Programme entrant
- NG = Next Gen Accelerator Program entrant
- w/o = Walkover
- r = Retired
- d = Defaulted

=== First qualifier ===
First round
1	(Austria) Sybille Bammer	6	3	6
(China) Li Ting	2	6	3
(China) Yan Zi	6	6
(Czech Republic) Lenka Nemecková	3	3
(Germany) Vanessa Henke	2	6	4
(Russia) Ekaterina Makarova	6	3	6
(Ukraine) Yuliya Beygelzimer	6	5	3
18	(India) Shikha Uberoi	0	7	6

Second round
1	(Austria) Sybille Bammer	4	6	6
(China) Yan Zi	6	4	4
(Russia) Ekaterina Makarova	5	6	4
18	(India) Shikha Uberoi	7	3	6

Qualifying competition
1	(Austria) Sybille Bammer	7^{7}	6
18	(India) Shikha Uberoi	6^{5}	2

=== Second qualifier ===
First round
2	(Spain) Lourdes Domínguez Lino	2	6	2
(United States) Jennifer Hopkins	6	4	6
(Japan) Shiho Hisamatsu	1	1
WC	(United States) Neha Uberoi	6	6
(Uzbekistan) Akgul Amanmuradova	4	2
(Hungary) Rita Kuti-Kis	6	6
(Croatia) Ivana Lisjak	7^{7}	6
29	(Germany) Sabine Klaschka	6^{3}	1

Second round
(United States) Jennifer Hopkins	7	5	6
WC	(United States) Neha Uberoi	5	7	2
(Hungary) Rita Kuti-Kis	6	1	4
(Croatia) Ivana Lisjak	4	6	6

Qualifying competition
(United States) Jennifer Hopkins	3	6^{10}
(Croatia) Ivana Lisjak	6	7^{12}

=== Third qualifier ===
First round
3	(Spain) María Sánchez Lorenzo	3	6	6
(United Kingdom) Jane O'Donoghue	6	0	3
(Hungary) Ágnes Szávay	2	3
(Ukraine) Olga Savchuk	6	6
(Italy) Alice Canepa	6	6
(Hungary) Zsófia Gubacsi	3	2
(Canada) Maureen Drake	3	1
17	(Finland) Emma Laine	6	6

Second round
3	(Spain) María Sánchez Lorenzo	4	6	7^{7}
(Ukraine) Olga Savchuk	6	4	6^{3}
(Italy) Alice Canepa	6^{6}	0
17	(Finland) Emma Laine	7^{8}	6

Qualifying competition
3	(Spain) María Sánchez Lorenzo	4	4
17	(Finland) Emma Laine	6	6

=== Fourth qualifier ===
First round
4	(Bulgaria) Tsvetana Pironkova	6	6
(Czech Republic) Olga Blahotová	4	4
(United States) Tiffany Dabek	6	5	7
(Czech Republic) Kateřina Böhmová	3	7	5
(Germany) Stephanie Gehrlein	3	6^{2}
(Czech Republic) Lucie Hradecká	6	7^{7}
(Portugal) Frederica Piedade	4	2
32	(Brazil) Maria-Fernanda Alves	6	6

Second round
4	(Bulgaria) Tsvetana Pironkova	3	6	2
(United States) Tiffany Dabek	6	4	6
(Czech Republic) Lucie Hradecká	3	2
32	(Brazil) Maria-Fernanda Alves	6	6

Qualifying competition
(United States) Tiffany Dabek	4	6	6
32	(Brazil) Maria-Fernanda Alves	6	2	3

=== Fifth qualifier ===
First round
5	(Sweden) Sofia Arvidsson	4	4
(Ukraine) Olena Schmelzer	6	6
(Germany) Marlene Weingärtner	2	0
(China) Sun Tiantian	6	6
(Italy) Adriana Serra Zanetti	4	2
(Czech Republic) Libuše Prušová	6	6
(Slovakia) Eva Fislová	3	1
23	(Slovakia) Ľudmila Cervanová	6	6

Second round
(Ukraine) Olena Schmelzer	2	6^{4}
(China) Sun Tiantian	6	7^{7}
(Czech Republic) Libuše Prušová	6	2	0
23	(Slovakia) Ľudmila Cervanová	4	6	6

Qualifying competition
(China) Sun Tiantian	6	6
23	(Slovakia) Ľudmila Cervanová	1	2

=== Sixth qualifier ===
First round
6	(Czech Republic) Hana Šromová	7	6
(Japan) Saori Obata	5	3
WC	(United States) Krystina Marcio	1	3
(Chinese Taipei) Hsieh Su-wei	6	6
(Venezuela) Milagros Sequera	3	7^{7}	7
(Netherlands) Elise Tamaëla	6	6^{5}	5
(Slovakia) Dominika Nociarová	6	6
22	(Spain) Marta Marrero	0	2

Second round
6	(Czech Republic) Hana Šromová	6	6^{3}	1
(Chinese Taipei) Hsieh Su-wei	4	7^{7}	6
(Venezuela) Milagros Sequera	6	5	6
(Slovakia) Dominika Nociarová	2	7	0

Qualifying competition
(Chinese Taipei) Hsieh Su-wei	7	6
(Venezuela) Milagros Sequera	5	3

=== Seventh qualifier ===
First round
7	(Germany) Sandra Klösel	6	5	6
(France) Mathilde Johansson	2	7	4
(Lithuania) Lina Stančiūtė	0	3
(Germany) Angelika Bachmann	6	6
(Luxembourg) Claudine Schaul	5	7	7^{8}
(Romania) Delia Sescioreanu	7	5	6^{6}
(Germany) Adriana Barna	4	1
31	(United States) Meilen Tu	6	6

Second round
7	(Germany) Sandra Klösel	7	3	6
(Germany) Angelika Bachmann	5	6	0
(Luxembourg) Claudine Schaul	4	6	6
31	(United States) Meilen Tu	6	2	2

Qualifying competition
7	(Germany) Sandra Klösel	6	6
(Luxembourg) Claudine Schaul	4	3

=== Eighth qualifier ===
First round
8	(Spain) Virginia Ruano Pascual	6	6
(Spain) Paula García	2	2
(South Africa) Chanelle Scheepers	3	6	6
(Zimbabwe) Cara Black	6	3	2
(Russia) Elena Vesnina	2	6	6
(Russia) Maria Kondratieva	6	2	4
(New Zealand) Marina Erakovic	6	6
20	(Estonia) Maret Ani	3	2

Second round
8	(Spain) Virginia Ruano Pascual	6	6
(South Africa) Chanelle Scheepers	2	1
(Russia) Elena Vesnina	2	1
(New Zealand) Marina Erakovic	6	6

Qualifying competition
8	(Spain) Virginia Ruano Pascual	7	6
(New Zealand) Marina Erakovic	5	3

=== Ninth qualifier ===
First round
9	(Switzerland) Emmanuelle Gagliardi	5	6	6
(Belarus) Ekaterina Dzehalevich	7	3	0
(Japan) Ryōko Fuda	4	4
(Estonia) Kaia Kanepi	6	6
(Chinese Taipei) Chuang Chia-jung	6	4	1
(United States) Sunitha Rao	4	6	6
WC	(United States) Madison Brengle	1	2
25	(Ukraine) Viktoriya Kutuzova	6	6

Second round
9	(Switzerland) Emmanuelle Gagliardi	6	6
(Estonia) Kaia Kanepi	4	2
(United States) Sunitha Rao	1	2
25	(Ukraine) Viktoriya Kutuzova	6	6

Qualifying competition
9	(Switzerland) Emmanuelle Gagliardi	4	1
25	(Ukraine) Viktoriya Kutuzova	6	6

=== Tenth qualifier ===
First round
10	(Russia) Tatiana Panova	6	6
(Slovakia) Jarmila Gajdošová	4	4
(Ukraine) Mariya Koryttseva	5	3
WC	(United States) Megan Bradley	7	6
WC	(France) Pauline Parmentier	6	6
WC	(United States) Raquel Kops-Jones	4	4
(United States) Julie Ditty	2	7^{7}	2
24	(Russia) Galina Voskoboeva	6	6^{3}	6

Second round
10	(Russia) Tatiana Panova	3	6	6
WC	(United States) Megan Bradley	6	0	1
WC	(France) Pauline Parmentier	0	7^{7}	6
24	(Russia) Galina Voskoboeva	6	6^{5}	4

Qualifying competition
10	(Russia) Tatiana Panova	3	6	3
WC	(France) Pauline Parmentier	6	1	6

=== Eleventh qualifier ===
First round
11	(Belarus) Anastasiya Yakimova	6	6
(Russia) Nina Bratchikova	4	2
(Belarus) Tatiana Poutchek	4	6	7^{7}
(Belgium) Kirsten Flipkens	6	3	6^{1}
(United States) Lilia Osterloh	6	6
(United States) Teryn Ashley	1	2
(Bosnia and Herzegovina) Mervana Jugić-Salkić	2	6^{7}
21	(Argentina) María Emilia Salerni	6	7^{9}

Second round
11	(Belarus) Anastasiya Yakimova	6	6
(Belarus) Tatiana Poutchek	4	2
(United States) Lilia Osterloh	6^{4}	6^{3}
21	(Argentina) María Emilia Salerni	7^{7}	7^{7}

Qualifying competition
11	(Belarus) Anastasiya Yakimova	5	2
21	(Argentina) María Emilia Salerni	7	6

=== Twelfth qualifier ===
First round
12	(Australia) Evie Dominikovic	5	6^{5}
(Croatia) Silvija Talaja	7	7^{7}
(Puerto Rico) Vilmarie Castellvi	6	6
(France) Virginie Pichet	2	4
(Japan) Seiko Okamoto	7	7^{7}
(Croatia) Nika Ožegović	5	6^{0}
(Slovakia) Stanislava Hrozenská	2	4
28	(Germany) Martina Müller	6	6

Second round
(Croatia) Silvija Talaja	7^{7}	3	2
(Puerto Rico) Vilmarie Castellvi	6^{3}	6	6
(Japan) Seiko Okamoto	4	2
28	(Germany) Martina Müller	6	6

Qualifying competition
(Puerto Rico) Vilmarie Castellvi	3	6	1
28	(Germany) Martina Müller	6	1	6

=== Thirteenth qualifier ===
First round
13	(Israel) Tzipora Obziler	1	4
(South Africa) Natalie Grandin	6	6
(Canada) Stéphanie Dubois	6	6
(Spain) Conchita Martínez Granados	0	1
(Luxembourg) Anne Kremer	6	6
(Croatia) Matea Mezak	4	1
WC	(United States) Julia Cohen	2	4
26	(Austria) Yvonne Meusburger	6	6

Second round
(South Africa) Natalie Grandin	6	6
(Canada) Stéphanie Dubois	0	2
(Luxembourg) Anne Kremer	7^{7}	6
26	(Austria) Yvonne Meusburger	6^{5}	0

Qualifying competition
(South Africa) Natalie Grandin	6	0	2
(Luxembourg) Anne Kremer	4	6	6

=== Fourteenth qualifier ===
First round
14	(Canada) Marie-Ève Pelletier	3	2
WC	(United States) Tara Snyder	6	6
(Sweden) Hanna Nooni	3	2
(Slovakia) Ľubomíra Kurhajcová	6	6
(Czech Republic) Sandra Kleinová	2	3
(United States) Ahsha Rolle	6	6
(Chinese Taipei) Chan Yung-jan	6	6
27	(United Kingdom) Elena Baltacha	1	0

Second round
WC	(United States) Tara Snyder	6	2	5
(Slovakia) Ľubomíra Kurhajcová	3	6	7
(United States) Ahsha Rolle	2	3
(Chinese Taipei) Chan Yung-jan	6	6

Qualifying competition
(Slovakia) Ľubomíra Kurhajcová	1	4
(Chinese Taipei) Chan Yung-jan	6	6

=== Fifteenth qualifier ===
First round
15	(France) Stéphanie Foretz	6	6
(Czech Republic) Eva Hrdinová	3	2
(Ukraine) Kateryna Bondarenko	6	6
(Estonia) Margit Rüütel	0	1
(Germany) Kathrin Wörle	3	6	6
(Tunisia) Selima Sfar	6	1	3
(Belgium) Els Callens	4	6	6
19	(Hungary) Melinda Czink	6	1	2

Second round
15	(France) Stéphanie Foretz	6	7^{7}
(Ukraine) Kateryna Bondarenko	2	6^{5}
(Germany) Kathrin Wörle	6	6
(Belgium) Els Callens	3	1

Qualifying competition
15	(France) Stéphanie Foretz	6	4	6
(Germany) Kathrin Wörle	3	6	4

=== Sixteenth qualifier ===
First round
16	(Uzbekistan) Varvara Lepchenko	5	7^{7}	2
(Slovakia) Katarína Kachlíková	7	6^{1}	6
WC	(United States) Vania King	6	5	6
(Croatia) Ivana Abramovic	2	7	0
(Hungary) Kira Nagy	6	4	5
(Slovakia) Henrieta Nagyová	2	6	0^{r}
(China) Yuan Meng	3	6	4
30	(Romania) Edina Gallovits	6	1	6

Second round
(Slovakia) Katarína Kachlíková	7	3	3
WC	(United States) Vania King	5	6	6
(Hungary) Kira Nagy	0	6^{5}
30	(Romania) Edina Gallovits	6	7^{7}

Qualifying competition
WC	(United States) Vania King	6	6^{1}	6
30	(Romania) Edina Gallovits	4	7^{7}	4
