= 2005 Wimbledon Championships – Girls' doubles =

Girls' doubles
- 2005 Wimbledon Championships

Final
- Champions: (Belarus) Victoria Azarenka (Hungary) Ágnes Szávay
- Runners-up: (New Zealand) Marina Erakovic (Romania) Monica Niculescu
- Score: 6–7^{(5–7)}, 6–2, 6–0

Events
Singles	men	women		boys	girls
Doubles	men	women	mixed	boys	girls
WC Singles	men	women	quad
WC Doubles	men	women	quad
Legends	men	women	seniors
← 2004 ·	Wimbledon Championships	· 2006 →

Victoria Azarenka and Olga Govortsova were the defending champions, and decided not to play together. Govortsova competed with Alisa Kleybanova but lost in the semifinals to Azarenka and her partner Ágnes Szávay.

Azarenka and Szávay defeated Marina Erakovic and Monica Niculescu in the final, 6–7^{(5–7)}, 6–2, 6–0 to win the girls' doubles tennis title at the 2005 Wimbledon Championships.

== Seeds ==
1. (Belarus) Victoria Azarenka / (Hungary) Ágnes Szávay (champions)
2. (New Zealand) Marina Erakovic / (Romania) Monica Niculescu (final)
3. (Netherlands) Bibiane Schoofs / (Denmark) Caroline Wozniacki (semifinals)
4. (United States) Alexa Glatch / (United States) Vania King (first round)
5. (Romania) Raluca Olaru / (Kazakhstan) Amina Rakhim (quarterfinals)
6. (Chinese Taipei) Chan Yung-jan / (Czech Republic) Nikola Fraňková (second round)
7. (Slovakia) Dominika Cibulková / (Georgia (country)) Anna Tatishvili (second round)
8. (United States) Jennifer-Lee Heinser / (United States) Elizabeth Plotkin (quarterfinals)

== Draw ==
=== Key ===
- Q = Qualifier
- WC = Wild card
- LL = Lucky loser
- Alt = Alternate
- SE = Special exempt
- PR = Protected ranking
- ITF = ITF entry
- JE = Junior exempt
- w/o = Walkover
- r = Retired
- d = Defaulted
- SR = Special ranking

=== Finals ===
Semifinals
1	(Belarus) Victoria Azarenka (Hungary) Ágnes Szávay	6	6
(Belarus) Olga Govortsova (Russia) Alisa Kleybanova	2	3
3	(Netherlands) Bibiane Schoofs (Denmark) Caroline Wozniacki	4	4
2	(New Zealand) Marina Erakovic (Romania) Monica Niculescu	6	6

Final
1	(Belarus) Victoria Azarenka (Hungary) Ágnes Szávay	6^{5}	6	6
2	(New Zealand) Marina Erakovic (Romania) Monica Niculescu	7^{7}	2	0

=== Top half ===
First round
1	(Belarus) Victoria Azarenka (Hungary) Ágnes Szávay	6	6
Alt	(United States) Lyndsay Burdette (United States) Ashley Weinhold	1	2
(Russia) Ekaterina Kosminskaya (Russia) Alla Kudryavtseva	4	6	1
(Poland) Agnieszka Radwańska (Poland) Urszula Radwańska	6	2	6
(Bolivia) María Fernanda Álvarez Terán (Brazil) Ana Clara Duarte	3	0
(Romania) Mihaela Buzărnescu (Romania) Mădălina Gojnea	6	6
(United States) Yvette Hyndman (United States) Jennifer Stevens	2	2
6	(Chinese Taipei) Chan Yung-jan (Czech Republic) Nikola Fraňková	6	6
4	(United States) Alexa Glatch (United States) Vania King	4	7	4
(Belarus) Olga Govortsova (Russia) Alisa Kleybanova	6	5	6
(Egypt) Magy Aziz (The Bahamas) Jessica Sweeting	4	1
(Austria) Tamira Paszek (Netherlands) Renée Reinhard	6	6
(Argentina) Florencia Molinero (France) Irena Pavlovic	6	6
WC	(United Kingdom) Jade Curtis (Germany) Sabine Lisicki	1	4
(Canada) Mélanie Gloria (Canada) Valérie Tétreault	3	2
7	(Slovakia) Dominika Cibulková (Georgia (country)) Anna Tatishvili	6	6

Second round
1	(Belarus) V Azarenka (Hungary) Á Szávay	4	6	6
(Poland) A Radwańska (Poland) U Radwańska	6	1	0
(Romania) M Buzărnescu (Romania) M Gojnea	4	6	6
(Chinese Taipei) Y-j Chan (Czech Republic) N Fraňková	6	4	1
(Belarus) O Govortsova (Russia) A Kleybanova	6	6
(Austria) T Paszek (Netherlands) R Reinhard	4	1
(Argentina) F Molinero (France) I Pavlovic	6	6
(Slovakia) D Cibulková (Georgia (country)) A Tatishvili	1	2

Quarterfinals
1	(Belarus) V Azarenka (Hungary) Á Szávay	6	6
(Romania) M Buzărnescu (Romania) M Gojnea	0	1
(Belarus) O Govortsova (Russia) A Kleybanova	6	6
(Argentina) F Molinero (France) I Pavlovic	4	0

Semifinals
1	(Belarus) V Azarenka (Hungary) Á Szávay	6	6
(Belarus) O Govortsova (Russia) A Kleybanova	2	3

=== Bottom half ===
First round
5	(Romania) Raluca Olaru (Kazakhstan) Amina Rakhim	6	6
(Italy) Astrid Besser (Slovenia) Polona Reberšak	0	2
WC	(United Kingdom) Claire Peterzan (United Kingdom) Laura Peterzan	3	1
(Czech Republic) Kateřina Kramperová (Romania) Ágnes Szatmári	6	6
(United States) Ellah Nze (Russia) Anastasia Pivovarova	3	2
(Slovakia) Jarmila Gajdošová (Belgium) Aude Vermoezen	6	6
(Russia) Ekaterina Makarova (Russia) Evgeniya Rodina	6	2	5
3	(Netherlands) Bibiane Schoofs (Denmark) Caroline Wozniacki	4	6	7
8	(United States) Jennifer-Lee Heinser (United States) Elizabeth Plotkin	6	6
WC	(United Kingdom) Julia Bone (United Kingdom) Samantha Murray	3	3
WC	(United Kingdom) Natasha Khan (United Kingdom) Georgie Stoop	3	4
(Australia) Olivia Lukaszewicz (Australia) Shayna McDowell	6	6
(Russia) Evgenia Grebenyuk (Russia) Yaroslava Shvedova	6	6
(New Zealand) Ellen Barry (Russia) Maya Gaverova	2	4
(Japan) Ayumi Morita (Japan) Erika Sema	3	3
2	(New Zealand) Marina Erakovic (Romania) Monica Niculescu	6	6

Second round
5	(Romania) R Olaru (Kazakhstan) A Rakhim	4	6	6
(Czech Republic) K Kramperová (Romania) Á Szatmári	6	4	3
(Slovakia) J Gajdošová (Belgium) A Vermoezen	1	2
3	(Netherlands) B Schoofs (Denmark) C Wozniacki	6	6
8	(United States) J-L Heinser (United States) E Plotkin	4	6	6
(Australia) O Lukaszewicz (Australia) S McDowell	6	1	3
(Russia) E Grebenyuk (Russia) Y Shvedova	4	2
2	(New Zealand) M Erakovic (Romania) M Niculescu	6	6

Quarterfinals
5	(Romania) R Olaru (Kazakhstan) A Rakhim	3	6	2
3	(Netherlands) B Schoofs (Denmark) C Wozniacki	6	3	6
8	(United States) J-L Heinser (United States) E Plotkin	3	2
2	(New Zealand) M Erakovic (Romania) M Niculescu	6	6

Semifinals
3	(Netherlands) B Schoofs (Denmark) C Wozniacki	4	4
2	(New Zealand) M Erakovic (Romania) M Niculescu	6	6
