= 2005 Wimbledon Championships – Girls' singles =

Girls' singles
- 2005 Wimbledon Championships

Final
- Champion: (Poland) Agnieszka Radwańska
- Runner-up: (Austria) Tamira Paszek
- Score: 6–3, 6–4

Details
- Draw: 64 (8 Q / 8 WC )
- Seeds: 16

Events
Singles	men	women		boys	girls
Doubles	men	women	mixed	boys	girls
WC Singles	men	women	quad
WC Doubles	men	women	quad
Legends	men	women	seniors
← 2004 ·	Wimbledon Championships	· 2006 →

Kateryna Bondarenko was the defending champion, but was no longer eligible to compete in the juniors this year.

Agnieszka Radwańska defeated Tamira Paszek in the final, 6–3, 6–4 to win the girls' singles tennis title at the 2005 Wimbledon Championships.

== Seeds ==
1. (Belarus) Victoria Azarenka (semifinals)
2. (Hungary) Ágnes Szávay (semifinals)
3. (United States) Jessica Kirkland (quarterfinals)
4. n/a
5. (Slovakia) Dominika Cibulková (quarterfinals)
6. (Canada) Aleksandra Wozniak (quarterfinals)
7. (Slovakia) Jarmila Gajdošová (third round)
8. (Romania) Raluca Olaru (second round)
9. (Chinese Taipei) Chan Yung-jan (third round)
10. (Denmark) Caroline Wozniacki (first round)
11. (New Zealand) Marina Erakovic (third round)
12. (Russia) Ekaterina Makarova (quarterfinals)
13. (United States) Alexa Glatch (third round)
14. (Romania) Monica Niculescu (second round)
15. (United States) Vania King (second round)
16. (Netherlands) Bibiane Schoofs (first round)

Click on the seed number of a player to go to their draw section.

== Draw ==
=== Key ===
- Q = Qualifier
- WC = Wild card
- LL = Lucky loser
- Alt = Alternate
- SE = Special exempt
- PR = Protected ranking
- ITF = ITF entry
- JE = Junior exempt
- w/o = Walkover
- r = Retired
- d = Defaulted
- SR = Special ranking

=== Finals ===
Quarterfinals
1	(Belarus) Victoria Azarenka	6	6
5	(Slovakia) Dominika Cibulková	4	1
3/WC	(United States) Jessica Kirkland	3	1
(Austria) Tamira Paszek	6	6
6	(Canada) Aleksandra Wozniak	0	6	2
(Poland) Agnieszka Radwańska	6	4	6
12	(Russia) Ekaterina Makarova	0	7^{8}	1
2	(Hungary) Ágnes Szávay	6	6^{6}	6

Semifinals
1	(Belarus) Victoria Azarenka	5	6	3
(Austria) Tamira Paszek	7	4	6
(Poland) Agnieszka Radwańska	7^{7}	6
2	(Hungary) Ágnes Szávay	6^{1}	2

Final
(Austria) Tamira Paszek	3	4
(Poland) Agnieszka Radwańska	6	6

=== Top half ===
==== Section 1 ====
First round
1	(Belarus) Victoria Azarenka	6	7
(France) Irena Pavlovic	2	5
(Kazakhstan) Amina Rakhim	7^{7}	4	6
(Russia) Yaroslava Shvedova	6^{5}	6	2
(Georgia (country)) Anna Tatishvili	6	6
(Japan) Erika Sema	2	4
WC	(United Kingdom) Julia Bone	1	2
15	(United States) Vania King	6	6
9	(Chinese Taipei) Chan Yung-jan	4	6	6
Q	(Germany) Sabine Lisicki	6	2	0
Q	(Russia) Anastasia Revzina	4	6^{4}
(Romania) Mădălina Gojnea	6	7^{7}
(Egypt) Magy Aziz	6	7
LL	(Brazil) Ana Clara Duarte	2	5
(United States) Elizabeth Plotkin	0	3
5	(Slovakia) Dominika Cibulková	6	6

Second round
1	(Belarus) V Azarenka	6	6
(Kazakhstan) A Rakhim	3	1
(Georgia (country)) A Tatishvili	6	6
15	(United States) V King	4	4
9	(Chinese Taipei) Y-j Chan	6	6
(Romania) M Gojnea	1	0
(Egypt) M Aziz	1	3
5	(Slovakia) D Cibulková	6	6

Third round
1	(Belarus) V Azarenka	4	6	6
(Georgia (country)) A Tatishvili	6	1	3
9	(Chinese Taipei) Y-j Chan	7^{7}	4	1
5	(Slovakia) D Cibulková	6^{4}	6	6

Quarterfinals
1	(Belarus) V Azarenka	6	6
5	(Slovakia) D Cibulková	4	1

==== Section 2 ====
First round
3/WC	(United States) Jessica Kirkland	6	6
(Russia) Eugenia Grebenyuk	4	2
Q	(Belgium) Aude Vermoezen	6	6
Q	(Australia) Shayna McDowell	1	1
(Argentina) Florencia Molinero	6	7^{9}
WC	(United Kingdom) Georgie Stoop	1	6^{7}
(Czech Republic) Kateřina Kramperová	3	7^{7}	6
16	(Netherlands) Bibiane Schoofs	6	6^{2}	3
11	(New Zealand) Marina Erakovic	6	6
WC	(United Kingdom) Samantha Murray	3	0
(Russia) Evgeniya Rodina	6	6
(Canada) Valérie Tétreault	4	2
(Slovenia) Polona Reberšak	2	6	3
(Austria) Tamira Paszek	6	3	6
Q	(Poland) Urszula Radwańska	6	3	4
8	(Romania) Raluca Olaru	3	6	6

Second round
3/WC	(United States) J Kirkland	6^{4}	6	6
(Belgium) A Vermoezen	7^{7}	4	2
(Argentina) F Molinero	1	0
(Czech Republic) K Kramperová	6	6
11	(New Zealand) M Erakovic	6	6
(Russia) E Rodina	3	3
(Austria) T Paszek	6	6
8	(Romania) R Olaru	2	2

Third round
3/WC	(United States) J Kirkland	2	6	6
(Czech Republic) K Kramperová	6	0	2
11	(New Zealand) M Erakovic	4	2
(Austria) T Paszek	6	6

Quarterfinals
3/WC	(United States) J Kirkland	3	1
(Austria) T Paszek	6	6

=== Bottom half ===
==== Section 3 ====
First round
6	(Canada) Aleksandra Wozniak	7	6
(United States) Jennifer-Lee Heinser	5	2
WC	(United Kingdom) Jade Curtis	4	3
(Australia) Olivia Lukaszewicz	6	6
(Russia) Ekaterina Kosminskaya	6	6
(Germany) Dominice Ripoll	1	3
(Czech Republic) Nikola Fraňková	6	3	6
10	(Denmark) Caroline Wozniacki	3	6	3
14	(Romania) Monica Niculescu	6	6
(Bolivia) María Fernanda Álvarez Terán	3	1
(Poland) Agnieszka Radwańska	6	6
LL	(Italy) Corinna Dentoni	4	2
WC	(United Kingdom) Claire Peterzan	6	2	3
Q	(New Zealand) Ellen Barry	4	6	6
(Russia) Alisa Kleybanova	6	7^{8}
LL	(United States) Ellah Nze	3	6^{6}

Second round
6	(Canada) A Wozniak	6	6
(Australia) O Lukaszewicz	3	2
(Russia) E Kosminskaya	4	4
(Czech Republic) N Fraňková	6	6
14	(Romania) M Niculescu	0	5
(Poland) A Radwańska	6	7
Q	(New Zealand) E Barry	0	2
(Russia) A Kleybanova	6	6

Third round
6	(Canada) A Wozniak	5	6	6
(Czech Republic) N Fraňková	7	4	2
(Poland) A Radwańska	6	7
(Russia) A Kleybanova	1	5

Quarterfinals
6	(Canada) A Wozniak	0	6	2
(Poland) A Radwańska	6	4	6

==== Section 4 ====
First round
7	(Slovakia) Jarmila Gajdošová	6	6
(Netherlands) Renée Reinhard	2	0
Q	(Russia) Maya Gaverova	4	6	4
WC	(United Kingdom) Natasha Khan	6	2	6
(Belarus) Olga Govortsova	4	2
(Romania) Mihaela Buzărnescu	6	6
Q	(Canada) Mélanie Gloria	3	4
12	(Russia) Ekaterina Makarova	6	6
13	(United States) Alexa Glatch	5	7^{7}	13
(Russia) Alla Kudryavtseva	7	6^{3}	11
WC	(United Kingdom) Laura Peterzan	3	7	6
(Romania) Ágnes Szatmári	6	5	4
(Italy) Astrid Besser	7^{7}	6
(The Bahamas) Jessica Sweeting	6^{4}	3
(Japan) Ayumi Morita	4	6^{5}
2	(Hungary) Ágnes Szávay	6	7^{7}

Second round
7	(Slovakia) J Gajdošová	6	6
WC	(United Kingdom) N Khan	2	1
(Romania) M Buzărnescu	5	4
12	(Russia) E Makarova	7	6
13	(United States) A Glatch	4	7	6
WC	(United Kingdom) L Peterzan	6	5	4
(Italy) A Besser	4	7	1
2	(Hungary) Á Szávay	6	5	6

Third round
7	(Slovakia) J Gajdošová	6	6^{3}	0
12	(Russia) E Makarova	4	7^{7}	6
13	(United States) A Glatch	4	4
2	(Hungary) Á Szávay	6	6

Quarterfinals
12	(Russia) E Makarova	0	7^{8}	1
2	(Hungary) Á Szávay	6	6^{6}	6
