= 2005 Wimbledon Championships – Boys' singles =

Boys' singles
- 2005 Wimbledon Championships

Final
- Champion: (France) Jérémy Chardy
- Runner-up: (Netherlands) Robin Haase
- Score: 6–4, 6–3

Details
- Draw: 64 (8 Q / 7 WC )
- Seeds: 16

Events
Singles	men	women		boys	girls
Doubles	men	women	mixed	boys	girls
WC Singles	men	women	quad
WC Doubles	men	women	quad
Legends	men	women	seniors
← 2004 ·	Wimbledon Championships	· 2006 →

Jérémy Chardy defeated Robin Haase in the final, 6–4, 6–3 to win the boys' singles tennis title at the 2005 Wimbledon Championships.

Gaël Monfils was the defending champion, but was no longer eligible to compete in junior events.

== Seeds ==
1. n/a
2. (United States) Donald Young (semifinals)
3. (Argentina) Leonardo Mayer (third round)
4. (South Korea) Kim Sun-yong (second round)
5. (Croatia) Marin Čilić (quarterfinals)
6. (Belgium) Niels Desein (third round)
7. (Ukraine) Sergei Bubka (first round)
8. (Croatia) Petar Jelenić (first round)
9. (Australia) Carsten Ball (first round)
10. (United States) Sam Querrey (third round)
11. (Brazil) André Miele (first round)
12. (Brazil) Raony Carvalho (first round)
13. (Austria) Andreas Haider-Maurer (first round)
14. (Netherlands) Robin Haase (final)
15. (United States) Timothy Neilly (quarterfinals)
16. (Venezuela) David Navarrete (second round)
17. (Netherlands) Thiemo de Bakker (third round)

Click on the seed number of a player to go to their draw section.

== Draw ==
=== Key ===
- Q = Qualifier
- WC = Wild card
- LL = Lucky loser
- Alt = Alternate
- ITF = ITF entry
- PR = Protected ranking
- SR = Special ranking
- SE = Special exempt
- JE = Junior exempt
- JR = Junior Accelerator Programme entrant
- CO = College Accelerator Programme entrant
- NG = Next Gen Accelerator Program entrant
- w/o = Walkover
- r = Retired
- d = Defaulted

=== Finals ===
Quarterfinals
(United States) Jesse Levine	4	3
(United States) Tim Smyczek	6	6
14	(Netherlands) Robin Haase	7^{7}	5	6
5	(Croatia) Marin Čilić	6^{4}	7	3
(France) Jérémy Chardy	6	6
15	(United States) Timothy Neilly	1	2
(Netherlands) Antal van der Duim	3	2
2	(United States) Donald Young	6	6

Semifinals
(United States) Tim Smyczek	6^{5}	7^{7}	4
14	(Netherlands) Robin Haase	7^{7}	6^{4}	6
(France) Jérémy Chardy	6	7^{7}
2	(United States) Donald Young	4	6^{4}

Final
14	(Netherlands) Robin Haase	4	3
(France) Jérémy Chardy	6	6

=== Top half ===
==== Section 1 ====
First round
17	(Netherlands) Thiemo de Bakker	6	6
Q	(Croatia) Mikhail Karpol	2	4
(Switzerland) Robin Roshardt	6	0	3
(India) Vivek Shokeen	3	6	6
(Ukraine) Alexandr Dolgopolov	3	2
(United States) Jesse Levine	6	6
(Hong Kong) Martin Sayer	4	4
16	(Venezuela) David Navarrete	6	6
12	(Brazil) Raony Carvalho	3	2
(Netherlands) Igor Sijsling	6	6
(United States) Tim Smyczek	6	6
LL	(Morocco) Anas Fattar	3	1
Q	(Austria) Christoph Hodl	1	6	7
(Russia) Evgeny Kirillov	6	4	9
(Germany) Jochen Schoettler	6^{1}	0
6	(Belgium) Niels Desein	7^{7}	6

Second round
17	(Netherlands) T de Bakker	7	4	6
(India) V Shokeen	5	6	1
(United States) J Levine	6	3	6
16	(Venezuela) D Navarrete	3	6	4
(Netherlands) I Sijsling	7^{7}	6^{4}	4
(United States) T Smyczek	6^{2}	7^{7}	6
(Russia) E Kirillov	6^{1}	5
6	(Belgium) N Desein	7^{7}	7

Third round
17	(Netherlands) T de Bakker	6	5	4
(United States) J Levine	2	7	6
(United States) T Smyczek	1	6	6
6	(Belgium) N Desein	6	3	0

Quarterfinals
(United States) J Levine	4	3
(United States) T Smyczek	6	6

==== Section 2 ====
First round
3	(Argentina) Leonardo Mayer	6	5	6
Q	(Namibia) Jurgens Strydom	4	7	4
Q	(Czech Republic) Jiří Košler	5	6^{4}
(United States) Michael Shabaz	7	7^{7}
WC	(United Kingdom) Faris Khatib	6	7^{7}
(Brazil) Luis Henrique Grangeiro	4	6^{2}
(Canada) Philip Bester	4	7^{7}	3
14	(Netherlands) Robin Haase	6	6^{3}	6
10	(United States) Sam Querrey	4	6	6
WC	(United Kingdom) Scott Dickson	6	3	2
Q	(Australia) Patrick Nicholls	5	4
(The Bahamas) Ryan Sweeting	7	6
Q	(United States) Bryan Koniecko	7	5	6
WC	(United Kingdom) Andrew Kennaugh	5	7	2
(Indonesia) Elbert Sie	3	3
5	(Croatia) Marin Čilić	6	6

Second round
3	(Argentina) L Mayer	6	7^{7}
(United States) M Shabaz	2	6^{5}
WC	(United Kingdom) F Khatib	3	6^{5}
14	(Netherlands) R Haase	6	7^{7}
10	(United States) S Querrey	2	6	6
(The Bahamas) R Sweeting	6	3	1
Q	(United States) B Koniecko	5	1
5	(Croatia) M Čilić	7	6

Third round
3	(Argentina) L Mayer	1	5
14	(Netherlands) R Haase	6	7
10	(United States) S Querrey	4	7^{7}	4
5	(Croatia) M Čilić	6	6^{1}	6

Quarterfinals
14	(Netherlands) R Haase	7^{7}	5	6
5	(Croatia) M Čilić	6^{4}	7	3

=== Bottom half ===
==== Section 3 ====
First round
8	(Croatia) Petar Jelenić	4	2^{r}
LL	(Argentina) Emiliano Massa	6	5
(Belarus) Serguei Tarasevitch	5	6	5
(France) Jérémy Chardy	7	2	7
(India) Jeevan Nedunchezhiyan	7	4	1
(United Kingdom) Myles Blake	5	6	6
(United States) Kellen Damico	4	6	6
11	(Brazil) André Miele	6	2	4
15	(United States) Timothy Neilly	6	1	6
Q	(Japan) Kei Nishikori	2	6	4
(Italy) Andrea Arnaboldi	7^{7}	6^{6}	6
WC	(United Kingdom) Matthew Taylor	6^{4}	7^{8}	3
(Australia) Andrew Coelho	5	5
(Kuwait) Abdullah Maqdes	7	7
Q	(Canada) Peter Polansky	4	3
4	(South Korea) Kim Sun-yong	6	6

Second round
LL	(Argentina) E Massa	3	1
(France) J Chardy	6	6
(United Kingdom) M Blake	6	6
(United States) K Damico	4	4
15	(United States) T Neilly	6	6
(Italy) A Arnaboldi	2	4
(Kuwait) A Maqdes	7^{7}	3	6
4	(South Korea) S-y Kim	6^{4}	6	3

Third round
(France) J Chardy	6	6
(United Kingdom) M Blake	4	4
15	(United States) T Neilly	6	6
(Kuwait) A Maqdes	3	1

Quarterfinals
(France) J Chardy	6	6
15	(United States) T Neilly	1	2

==== Section 4 ====
First round
7	(Ukraine) Sergei Bubka	4	4
WC	(Czech Republic) Dušan Lojda	6	6
(Germany) Aljoscha Thron	5	6^{1}
(United States) Dylan Arnould	7	7^{7}
(India) Sanam Singh	6	6
WC	(United Kingdom) Christopher Llewellyn	0	2
(Netherlands) Antal van der Duim	7^{12}	3	6
9	(Australia) Carsten Ball	6^{10}	6	2
13	(Austria) Andreas Haider-Maurer	3	3
(Venezuela) Piero Luisi	6	6
(Switzerland) Alexander Sadecky	6	6
(United States) Jamie Hunt	3	4
(Russia) Pavel Chekhov	3	3
(Republic of Ireland) Tristan Farron-Mahon	6	6
WC	(United Kingdom) Chris Eaton	1	5
2	(United States) Donald Young	6	7

Second round
WC	(Czech Republic) D Lojda	6	7
(United States) D Arnould	4	5
(India) S Singh	2	3
(Netherlands) A van der Duim	6	6
(Venezuela) P Luisi	6	6
(Switzerland) A Sadecky	4	4
(Republic of Ireland) T Farron-Mahon	1	4
2	(United States) D Young	6	6

Third round
WC	(Czech Republic) D Lojda	4	2
(Netherlands) A van der Duim	6	6
(Venezuela) P Luisi	6^{8}	2
2	(United States) D Young	7^{10}	6

Quarterfinals
(Netherlands) A van der Duim	3	2
2	(United States) D Young	6	6
