= 2005 Wimbledon Championships – Boys' doubles =

Boys' doubles
- 2005 Wimbledon Championships

Final
- Champions: (United States) Jesse Levine (United States) Michael Shabaz
- Runners-up: (Australia) Samuel Groth (United Kingdom) Andrew Kennaugh
- Score: 6–4, 6–1

Events
Singles	men	women		boys	girls
Doubles	men	women	mixed	boys	girls
WC Singles	men	women	quad
WC Doubles	men	women	quad
Legends	men	women	seniors
← 2004 ·	Wimbledon Championships	· 2006 →

Brendan Evans and Scott Oudsema were the defending champions, but both were ineligible to compete in the juniors this year.

Jesse Levine and Michael Shabaz defeated Samuel Groth and Andrew Kennaugh in the final, 6–4, 6–1 to win the boys' doubles tennis title at the 2005 Wimbledon Championships.

== Seeds ==
1. (Brazil) Luis Henrique Grangeiro / (Brazil) André Miele (first round)
2. (United States) Timothy Neilly / (United States) Sam Querrey (first round)
3. (South Korea) Kim Sun-yong / (Germany) Aljoscha Thron (first round)
4. (Italy) Andrea Arnaboldi / (Belgium) Niels Desein (first round)
5. (Austria) Andreas Haider-Maurer / (Czech Republic) Dušan Lojda (first round)
6. (Netherlands) Thiemo de Bakker / (Netherlands) Antal van der Duim (semifinals)
7. (Argentina) Emiliano Massa / (Argentina) Leonardo Mayer (first round)
8. (Venezuela) Piero Luisi / (The Bahamas) Ryan Sweeting (first round)

== Draw ==
=== Key ===
- Q = Qualifier
- WC = Wild card
- LL = Lucky loser
- Alt = Alternate
- SE = Special exempt
- PR = Protected ranking
- ITF = ITF entry
- JE = Junior exempt
- w/o = Walkover
- r = Retired
- d = Defaulted
- SR = Special ranking

=== Finals ===
Semifinals
WC	(Australia) Samuel Groth (United Kingdom) Andrew Kennaugh	6	3	15
6	(Netherlands) Thiemo de Bakker (Netherlands) Antal van der Duim	3	6	13
WC	(United Kingdom) Christopher Llewellyn (Namibia) Jurgens Strydom	6^{4}	3
(United States) Jesse Levine (United States) Michael Shabaz	7^{7}	6

Final
WC	(Australia) Samuel Groth (United Kingdom) Andrew Kennaugh	4	1
(United States) Jesse Levine (United States) Michael Shabaz	6	6

=== Top half ===
First round
1	(Brazil) Luis Henrique Grangeiro (Brazil) André Miele	6^{4}	4
(Netherlands) Robin Haase (Netherlands) Igor Sijsling	7^{7}	6
(Australia) Andrew Coelho (Australia) Patrick Nicholls	6	6
(Russia) Pavel Chekhov (Russia) Evgeny Kirillov	3	4
(Kuwait) Abdullah Maqdes (India) Vivek Shokeen	4	6	9
(Austria) Christoph Hodl (Germany) Jochen Schoettler	6	3	7
WC	(Australia) Samuel Groth (United Kingdom) Andrew Kennaugh	5	6	7
5	(Austria) Andreas Haider-Maurer (Czech Republic) Dušan Lojda	7	4	5
4	(Italy) Andrea Arnaboldi (Belgium) Niels Desein	6	3	4
(France) Jérémy Chardy (Venezuela) David Navarrete	2	6	6
(Switzerland) Robin Roshardt (Switzerland) Alexander Sadecky	7^{7}	6
(United Kingdom) Myles Blake (Australia) Todd Ley	6^{4}	3
(Brazil) Raony Carvalho (Japan) Kei Nishikori	6	6
(Indonesia) Elbert Sie (Japan) Shuhei Uzawa	3	3
(United States) Bryan Koniecko (Hong Kong) Martin Sayer	4	4
6	(Netherlands) Thiemo de Bakker (Netherlands) Antal van der Duim	6	6

Second round
(Netherlands) R Haase (Netherlands) I Sijsling	6^{6}	4
(Australia) A Coelho (Australia) P Nicholls	7^{8}	6
(Kuwait) A Maqdes (India) V Shokeen	3	2
WC	(Australia) S Groth (United Kingdom) A Kennaugh	6	6
(France) J Chardy (Venezuela) D Navarrete	4	3
(Switzerland) R Roshardt (Switzerland) A Sadecky	6	6
(Brazil) R Carvalho (Japan) K Nishikori	6	2	3
6	(Netherlands) T de Bakker (Netherlands) A van der Duim	3	6	6

Quarterfinals
(Australia) A Coelho (Australia) P Nicholls	6^{5}	3
WC	(Australia) S Groth (United Kingdom) A Kennaugh	7^{7}	6
(Switzerland) R Roshardt (Switzerland) A Sadecky	4	4
6	(Netherlands) T de Bakker (Netherlands) A van der Duim	6	6

Semifinals
WC	(Australia) S Groth (United Kingdom) A Kennaugh	6	3	15
6	(Netherlands) T de Bakker (Netherlands) A van der Duim	3	6	13

=== Bottom half ===
First round
7	(Argentina) Emiliano Massa (Argentina) Leonardo Mayer	1	4
(United States) Dylan Arnould (United States) Jamie Hunt	6	6
Alt	(Egypt) Ali El Sherbini (Morocco) Anas Fattar	6	6^{5}	4
WC	(United Kingdom) Christopher Llewellyn (Namibia) Jurgens Strydom	4	7^{7}	6
(Croatia) Petar Jelenić (Croatia) Mikhail Karpol	4	1
WC	(United Kingdom) Chris Eaton (United Kingdom) Faris Khatib	6	6
(United States) Kellen Damico (United States) Tim Smyczek	4	6	6
3	(South Korea) Kim Sun-yong (Germany) Aljoscha Thron	6	3	4
8	(Venezuela) Piero Luisi (The Bahamas) Ryan Sweeting	7	4	4
(Canada) Philip Bester (Canada) Peter Polansky	5	6	6
WC	(Japan) Sho Aida (Czech Republic) Jiří Košler	3	4
(India) Jeevan Nedunchezhiyan (India) Sanam Singh	6	6
(United States) Jesse Levine (United States) Michael Shabaz	6	6
(Croatia) Marin Čilić (Republic of Ireland) Tristan Farron-Mahon	3	4
(Ukraine) Alexandr Dolgopolov (Belarus) Serguei Tarasevitch	3	6	6
2	(United States) Timothy Neilly (United States) Sam Querrey	6	3	4

Second round
(United States) D Arnould (United States) J Hunt	6^{3}	6^{5}
WC	(United Kingdom) C Llewellyn (Namibia) J Strydom	7^{7}	7^{7}
WC	(United Kingdom) C Eaton (United Kingdom) F Khatib	3	4
(United States) K Damico (United States) T Smyczek	6	6
(Canada) P Bester (Canada) P Polansky	7	7^{7}
(India) J Nedunchezhiyan (India) S Singh	5	6^{4}
(United States) J Levine (United States) M Shabaz	6	6
(Ukraine) A Dolgopolov (Belarus) S Tarasevitch	3	4

Quarterfinals
WC	(United Kingdom) C Llewellyn (Namibia) J Strydom	6	7^{7}
(United States) K Damico (United States) T Smyczek	3	6^{4}
(Canada) P Bester (Canada) P Polansky	7	4	2
(United States) J Levine (United States) M Shabaz	5	6	6

Semifinals
WC	(United Kingdom) C Llewellyn (Namibia) J Strydom	6^{4}	3
(United States) J Levine (United States) M Shabaz	7^{7}	6
