= 2005 US Open – Boys' singles =

Boys' singles
- 2005 US Open

Final
- Champion: (The Bahamas) Ryan Sweeting
- Runner-up: (France) Jérémy Chardy
- Score: 6–4, 6–4

Events
Singles	men	women		boys	girls
Doubles	men	women	mixed	boys	girls
WC Singles	men	women	quad
WC Doubles	men	women	quad
Legends	men	women	mixed
- US Open

The United States Open Tennis Championships is a hardcourt tennis tournament held annually at Flushing Meadows, starting on the last Monday in August and lasting for two weeks. The tournament consists of five main championship events: men's and women's singles, men's and women's doubles, and mixed doubles, with additional tournaments for seniors, juniors, and wheelchair players.

In 2005, Andy Murray was the defending champion in the boys' singles event, but did not complete in Juniors this year. The event was won by Ryan Sweeting of the Bahamas who beat Jérémy Chardy of France, 6–4, 6–4 in the final.

== Seeds ==
1. (United States) Donald Young (quarterfinals)
2. (Croatia) Marin Čilić (quarterfinals)
3. (Argentina) Leonardo Mayer (quarterfinals)
4. (Colombia) Santiago Giraldo (semifinals)
5. (United States) Alex Kuznetsov (third round)
6. (South Korea) Kim Sun-yong (semifinals)
7. (France) Jérémy Chardy (final)
8. (Belgium) Niels Desein (first round)
9. (Netherlands) Thiemo de Bakker (second round)
10. (United States) Timothy Neilly (second round)
11. (Croatia) Petar Jelenić (first round)
12. (Australia) Carsten Ball (first round)
13. (United States) Sam Querrey (third round)
14. (Russia) Evgeny Kirillov (third round)
15. (Brazil) André Miele (first round)
16. (United States) Jesse Levine (second round)

== Draw ==
Key

- Q = Qualifier
- WC = Wild card
- LL = Lucky loser
- Alt = Alternate
- ITF = ITF entry
- PR = Protected ranking
- SR = Special ranking
- SE = Special exempt
- JE = Junior exempt
- JR = Junior Accelerator Programme entrant
- CO = College Accelerator Programme entrant
- NG = Next Gen Accelerator Program entrant
- w/o = Walkover
- r = Retired
- d = Defaulted

=== Finals ===
Quarterfinals
1	(United States) Donald Young	6^{1}	6	6^{2}
6	(South Korea) Kim Sun-yong	7^{7}	2	7^{7}
3	(Argentina) Leonardo Mayer	4	5
(The Bahamas) Ryan Sweeting	6	7
(United States) Tim Smyczek	1	6	2
4	(Colombia) Santiago Giraldo	6	3	6
7	(France) Jérémy Chardy	4	6	6
2	(Croatia) Marin Čilić	6	4	2

Semifinals
6	(South Korea) Kim Sun-yong	4	0
(The Bahamas) Ryan Sweeting	6	6
4	(Colombia) Santiago Giraldo	6^{5}	2
7	(France) Jérémy Chardy	7^{7}	6

Final
(The Bahamas) Ryan Sweeting	6	6
7	(France) Jérémy Chardy	4	4

=== Top half ===
==== Section 1 ====
First round
1	(United States) Donald Young	3	6	6
(Canada) Philip Bester	6	1	3
(Venezuela) David Navarrete	6	5	6
(India) Vivek Shokeen	3	7	2
WC	(United States) Nathaniel Schnugg	3	4
LL	(India) Rupesh Roy	6	6
Q	(United States) Matt Bruch	6	4	6
15	(Brazil) André Miele	4	6	1
11	(Croatia) Petar Jelenić	4	6	1
(Kenya) Christian Vitulli	6	1	6
(United States) Michael Shabaz	5	7	6
(Russia) Valery Rudnev	7	5	3
(United States) Kellen Damico	4	6	3
(Germany) Jochen Schoettler	6	4	6
WC	(United States) Dylan Arnould	2	3
6	(South Korea) Kim Sun-yong	6	6

Second round
1	(United States) D Young	4	6	6
(Venezuela) D Navarrete	6	2	0
LL	(India) R Roy	6	4	3
Q	(United States) M Bruch	3	6	6
(Kenya) C Vitulli	4	6	7
(United States) M Shabaz	6	4	5
(Germany) J Schoettler	3	4
6	(South Korea) S-y Kim	6	6

Third round
1	(United States) D Young	6^{4}	7^{7}	6
Q	(United States) M Bruch	7^{7}	6^{4}	2
(Kenya) C Vitulli	5	4
6	(South Korea) S-y Kim	7	6

Quarterfinals
1	(United States) D Young	6^{1}	6	6^{2}
6	(South Korea) S-y Kim	7^{7}	2	7^{7}

==== Section 2 ====
First round
3	(Argentina) Leonardo Mayer	6	6
(Spain) Javier Garrapiz-Borderías	2	0
WC	(United States) Jamie Hunt	4	6^{4}
(Czech Republic) Dušan Lojda	6	7^{7}
(Croatia) Luka Belić	6	6
Q	(France) Kevin Botti	2	4
(Hong Kong) Martin Sayer	4	2
13	(United States) Sam Querrey	6	6
12	(Australia) Carsten Ball	6	3	6^{1}
(The Bahamas) Ryan Sweeting	2	6	7^{7}
(Italy) Andrea Arnaboldi	6	1	6
(United Kingdom) Andrew Kennaugh	3	6	1
(Slovakia) Lukáš Lacko	6	6
Q	(Japan) Kento Takeuchi	3	4
WC	(United States) Holden Seguso	6	6
8	(Belgium) Niels Desein	4	4

Second round
3	(Argentina) L Mayer	7	6
(Czech Republic) D Lojda	5	4
(Croatia) L Belić	3	3
13	(United States) S Querrey	6	6
(The Bahamas) R Sweeting	6	3	6
(Italy) A Arnaboldi	3	6	1
(Slovakia) L Lacko	6^{5}	1
WC	(United States) H Seguso	7^{7}	6

Third round
3	(Argentina) L Mayer	7^{7}	7^{7}
13	(United States) S Querrey	6^{4}	6^{3}
(The Bahamas) R Sweeting	6	6
WC	(United States) H Seguso	1	2

Quarterfinals
3	(Argentina) L Mayer	4	5
(The Bahamas) R Sweeting	6	7

=== Bottom half ===
==== Section 3 ====
First round
5	(United States) Alex Kuznetsov	6^{3}	6	6
(Croatia) Nikola Mektić	7^{7}	4	3
(United States) Dennis Lajola	6	6
Q	(Japan) Sho Aida	3	1
(United States) Tim Smyczek	6	1	6
(Russia) Pavel Chekhov	3	6	4
(Kuwait) Abdullah Maqdes	1	6^{3}
9	(Netherlands) Thiemo de Bakker	6	7^{7}
16	(United States) Jesse Levine	6	6
(India) Jeevan Nedunchezhiyan	4	4
Q	(Mexico) Miguel Ángel Reyes-Varela	2	4
(Venezuela) Piero Luisi	6	6
(Australia) James Lemke	5	2
(Croatia) Antonio Veić	7	6
Q	(Canada) Peter Polansky	2	2
4	(Colombia) Santiago Giraldo	6	6

Second round
5	(United States) A Kuznetsov	6	6
(United States) D Lajola	3	2
(United States) T Smyczek	6	7^{7}
9	(Netherlands) T de Bakker	1	6^{0}
16	(United States) J Levine	6	4	0
(Venezuela) P Luisi	4	6	6
(Croatia) A Veić	4	2
4	(Colombia) S Giraldo	6	6

Third round
5	(United States) A Kuznetsov	6^{3}	4
(United States) T Smyczek	7^{7}	6
(Venezuela) P Luisi	2	5
4	(Colombia) S Giraldo	6	7

Quarterfinals
(United States) T Smyczek	1	6	2
4	(Colombia) S Giraldo	6	3	6

==== Section 4 ====
First round
7	(France) Jérémy Chardy	6	6
Q	(Panama) Alberto González	1	3
WC	(United States) Johnny Hamui	4	2
Q	(Sweden) Karl Norberg	6	6
(Slovakia) Pavol Červenák	2	3
LL	(Japan) Kei Nishikori	6	6
LL	(Estonia) Jaak Põldma	5	6^{3}
10	(United States) Timothy Neilly	7	7^{7}
14	(Russia) Evgeny Kirillov	7^{7}	6
(Republic of Ireland) Tristan Farron-Mahon	6^{5}	3
(United States) Alex Clayton	5	6	6
(Ukraine) Ivan Sergeyev	7	3	3
WC	(United States) Wil Spencer	7	4	4
(Australia) Stephen Donald	5	6	1^{r}
WC	(United States) Michael McClune	2	2
2	(Croatia) Marin Čilić	6	6

Second round
7	(France) J Chardy	6	6
Q	(Sweden) K Norberg	3	3
LL	(Japan) K Nishikori	6	6
10	(United States) T Neilly	4	0
14	(Russia) E Kirillov	4	6	7^{7}
(United States) A Clayton	6	4	6^{4}
WC	(United States) W Spencer	6^{3}	4
2	(Croatia) M Čilić	7^{7}	6

Third round
7	(France) J Chardy	7	6
LL	(Japan) K Nishikori	5	1
14	(Russia) E Kirillov	6^{5}	4
2	(Croatia) M Čilić	7^{7}	6

Quarterfinals
7	(France) J Chardy	4	6	6
2	(Croatia) M Čilić	6	4	2
