= 2005 Wimbledon Championships – Mixed doubles =

Mixed doubles
- 2005 Wimbledon Championships

Final
- Champions: (India) Mahesh Bhupathi (France) Mary Pierce
- Runners-up: (Australia) Paul Hanley (Ukraine) Tatiana Perebiynis
- Score: 6–4, 6–2

Details
- Draw: 48 (5 WC )
- Seeds: 16

Events
Singles	men	women		boys	girls
Doubles	men	women	mixed	boys	girls
WC Singles	men	women	quad
WC Doubles	men	women	quad
Legends	men	women	seniors
← 2004 ·	Wimbledon Championships	· 2006 →

Wayne and Cara Black were the defending champions but lost in the second round to Mahesh Bhupathi and Mary Pierce.

Bhupathi and Pierce defeated Paul Hanley and Tatiana Perebiynis in the final, 6–4, 6–2 to win the mixed doubles tennis title at the 2005 Wimbledon Championships.

== Seeds ==
All seeds received a bye into the second round.

1. (United States) Bob Bryan / (Australia) Rennae Stubbs (second round)
2. (Zimbabwe) Wayne Black / (Zimbabwe) Cara Black (second round)
3. (Sweden) Jonas Björkman / (United States) Lisa Raymond (semifinals)
4. (Zimbabwe) Kevin Ullyett / (South Africa) Liezel Huber (semifinals)
5. (United States) Mike Bryan / (United States) Martina Navratilova (quarterfinals)
6. (Australia) Todd Woodbridge / (Australia) Samantha Stosur (quarterfinals)
7. (Czech Republic) Leoš Friedl / (Slovakia) Janette Husárová (third round)
8. (The Bahamas) Mark Knowles / (United States) Venus Williams (third round)
9. (Czech Republic) Pavel Vízner / (United States) Nicole Pratt (second round)
10. (Serbia and Montenegro) Nenad Zimonjić / (Slovenia) Katarina Srebotnik (third round)
11. (United States) Jared Palmer / (United States) Corina Morariu (second round)
12. (Belgium) Olivier Rochus / (Belgium) Kim Clijsters (quarterfinals)
13. (Austria) Julian Knowle / (Germany) Anna-Lena Grönefeld (third round)
14. (Slovakia) Dominik Hrbatý / (Russia) Elena Likhovtseva (third round)
15. (Czech Republic) Martin Damm / (Czech Republic) Květa Peschke (second round)
16. (Israel) Andy Ram / (Spain) Conchita Martínez (third round)

Click on the seed number of a player to go to their draw section.

== Draw ==
=== Key ===
- Q = Qualifier
- WC = Wild card
- LL = Lucky loser
- Alt = Alternate
- SE = Special exempt
- PR = Protected ranking
- ITF = ITF entry
- JE = Junior exempt
- w/o = Walkover
- r = Retired
- d = Defaulted
- SR = Special ranking

=== Finals ===
Quarterfinals
(Argentina) Mariano Hood (Argentina) Gisela Dulko	3	4
(Australia) Paul Hanley (Ukraine) Tatiana Perebiynis	6	6
5	(United States) Mike Bryan (United States) Martina Navratilova	6	4	7
4	(Zimbabwe) Kevin Ullyett (South Africa) Liezel Huber	3	6	9
6	(Australia) Todd Woodbridge (Australia) Samantha Stosur	2	6^{13}
3	(Sweden) Jonas Björkman (United States) Lisa Raymond	6	7^{15}
12	(Belgium) Olivier Rochus (Belgium) Kim Clijsters	1	5
(India) Mahesh Bhupathi (France) Mary Pierce	6	7

Semifinals
(Australia) Paul Hanley (Ukraine) Tatiana Perebiynis	6	6
4	(Zimbabwe) Kevin Ullyett (South Africa) Liezel Huber	3	4
3	(Sweden) Jonas Björkman (United States) Lisa Raymond	5	1
(India) Mahesh Bhupathi (France) Mary Pierce	7	6

Final
(Australia) Paul Hanley (Ukraine) Tatiana Perebiynis	4	2
(India) Mahesh Bhupathi (France) Mary Pierce	6	6

=== Top half ===
==== Section 1 ====
First round
(Romania) A Pavel (Romania) A Vanc	7	4	9
(Argentina) M Hood (Argentina) G Dulko	5	6	11
(Czech Republic) P Pála (Czech Republic) G Navrátilová	3	2
(United States) G Oliver (Russia) M Kirilenko	6	6
(Australia) P Hanley (Ukraine) T Perebiynis	6	7^{11}
Alt	(South Africa) R Koenig (Croatia) S Talaja	3	6^{9}
Alt	(Argentina) G Etlis (Australia) L McShea	7^{7}	2	5
(Sweden) S Aspelin (India) S Mirza	6^{5}	6	7

Second round
1	(United States) B Bryan (Australia) R Stubbs	4	6	5
(Argentina) M Hood (Argentina) G Dulko	6	3	7
(United States) G Oliver (Russia) M Kirilenko	7^{8}	3	2
14	(Slovakia) D Hrbatý (Russia) E Likhovtseva	6^{6}	6	6
11	(United States) J Palmer (United States) C Morariu	6	4	5
(Australia) P Hanley (Ukraine) T Perebiynis	2	6	7
(Sweden) S Aspelin (India) S Mirza	2	4
7	(Czech Republic) L Friedl (Slovakia) J Husárová	6	6

Third round
(Argentina) M Hood (Argentina) G Dulko	6	6
14	(Slovakia) D Hrbatý (Russia) E Likhovtseva	2	1
(Australia) P Hanley (Ukraine) T Perebiynis	6	5
7	(Czech Republic) L Friedl (Slovakia) J Husárová	4	2^{r}

Quarterfinals
(Argentina) M Hood (Argentina) G Dulko	3	4
(Australia) P Hanley (Ukraine) T Perebiynis	6	6

==== Section 2 ====
First round
WC	(United Kingdom) A Parmar (United Kingdom) J O'Donoghue	5	2
(Germany) M Kohlmann (Russia) A Myskina	7	6
(United States) J Thomas (United States) J Russell	6	4	5
(Czech Republic) C Suk (Serbia and Montenegro) J Janković	1	6	7
WC	(United Kingdom) J Baker (United Kingdom) C Curran	6	3	1
(United States) T Parrott (United States) A Frazier	3	6	6
WC	(United Kingdom) A Murray (Israel) S Pe'er	3	4
(Argentina) L Arnold Ker (Switzerland) E Gagliardi	6	6

Second round
4	(Zimbabwe) K Ullyett (South Africa) L Huber
(Germany) M Kohlmann (Russia) A Myskina	w/o
(Czech Republic) C Suk (Serbia and Montenegro) J Janković	w/o
16	(Israel) A Ram (Spain) C Martínez
9	(Czech Republic) P Vízner (Australia) N Pratt	6^{3}	3
(United States) T Parrott (United States) A Frazier	7^{7}	6
(Argentina) L Arnold Ker (Switzerland) E Gagliardi	w/o
5	(United States) M Bryan (United States) M Navratilova

Third round
4	(Zimbabwe) K Ullyett (South Africa) L Huber	4	6	8
16	(Israel) A Ram (Spain) C Martínez	6	3	6
(United States) T Parrott (United States) A Frazier	5	7^{7}	4
5	(United States) M Bryan (United States) M Navratilova	7	6^{4}	6

Quarterfinals
4	(Zimbabwe) K Ullyett (South Africa) L Huber	3	6	9
5	(United States) M Bryan (United States) M Navratilova	6	4	7

=== Bottom half ===
==== Section 3 ====
First round
(Argentina) M Rodríguez (Russia) A Jidkova	2	7^{7}	6
(Czech Republic) J Levinský (Russia) A Chakvetadze	6	6^{5}	8
(Australia) J Kerr (Russia) E Linetskaya	4	4
Alt	(United States) B MacPhie (United States) A Spears	6	6
(Israel) J Erlich (Australia) B Stewart	6	6
WC	(United Kingdom) J Delgado (United Kingdom) A Janes	4	4
(Switzerland) Y Allegro (Bulgaria) M Maleeva	5	2
(Spain) Á López Morón (Spain) A Medina Garrigues	7	6

Second round
6	(Australia) T Woodbridge (Australia) S Stosur	6	7^{7}
(Czech Republic) J Levinský (Russia) A Chakvetadze	1	6^{5}
Alt	(United States) B MacPhie (United States) A Spears	2	7	4
10	(Serbia and Montenegro) N Zimonjić (Slovenia) K Srebotnik	6	5	6
13	(Austria) J Knowle (Germany) A-L Grönefeld	6	6^{5}	6
(Israel) J Erlich (Australia) B Stewart	3	7^{7}	2
(Spain) Á López Morón (Spain) A Medina Garrigues	2	1
3	(Sweden) J Björkman (United States) L Raymond	6	6

Third round
6	(Australia) T Woodbridge (Australia) S Stosur	3	6	6
10	(Serbia and Montenegro) N Zimonjić (Slovenia) K Srebotnik	6	2	3
13	(Austria) J Knowle (Germany) AL Grönefeld	2	3
3	(Sweden) J Björkman (United States) L Raymond	6	6

Quarterfinals
6	(Australia) T Woodbridge (Australia) S Stosur	2	6^{13}
3	(Sweden) J Björkman (United States) L Raymond	6	7^{15}

==== Section 4 ====
First round
(United States) J Gimelstob (Slovenia) T Križan	0^{r}
(Australia) T Perry (Belgium) E Callens	4
(Australia) A Fisher (Croatia) J Kostanić	6	6
(Czech Republic) J Novák (Italy) T Garbin	3	4
(Argentina) M García (Italy) M Santangelo	6	6
(Argentina) S Prieto (Venezuela) M Vento-Kabchi	3	4
(India) M Bhupathi (France) M Pierce	6	6
WC	(United Kingdom) D Sherwood (United Kingdom) E Baltacha	3	4

Second round
8	(The Bahamas) M Knowles (United States) V Williams	6^{6}	6	6
(Australia) T Perry (Belgium) E Callens	7^{8}	4	4
(South Africa) A Fisher (Croatia) J Kostanić	1	3
12	(Belgium) O Rochus (Belgium) K Clijsters	6	6
15	(Czech Republic) M Damm (Czech Republic) K Peschke	6	1	2
(Argentina) M García (Italy) M Santangelo	4	6	6
(India) M Bhupathi (France) M Pierce	6	6
2	(Zimbabwe) W Black (Zimbabwe) C Black	3	4

Third round
8	(The Bahamas) M Knowles (United States) V Williams	6	3	5
12	(Belgium) O Rochus (Belgium) K Clijsters	3	6	7
(Argentina) M García (Italy) M Santangelo	3	6^{5}
(India) M Bhupathi (France) M Pierce	6	7^{7}

Quarterfinals
12	(Belgium) O Rochus (Belgium) K Clijsters	1	5
(India) M Bhupathi (France) M Pierce	6	7
