= 2005 US Open – Girls' doubles =

Girls' doubles
- 2005 US Open

Final
- Champions: (Czech Republic) Nikola Fraňková (Russia) Alisa Kleybanova
- Runners-up: (United States) Alexa Glatch (United States) Vania King
- Score: 7–5, 7–6^{(7–3)}

Events
| Singles | men | women | | boys | girls |
| Doubles | men | women | mixed | boys | girls |
| WC Singles | men | women | quad |
| WC Doubles | men | women | quad |
| Legends | men | women | mixed |
- US Open

Marina Erakovic and Michaëlla Krajicek were the defending champions, but Michaëlla Krajicek did not compete in the juniors that year.

Marina Erakovic played alongside Victoria Azarenka and withdrew from the quarterfinals.

Nikola Fraňková and Alisa Kleybanova won the tournament, defeating Alexa Glatch and Vania King in the final, 7–5, 7–6^{(7–3)}.

== Seeds ==
1. (Belarus) Victoria Azarenka / (New Zealand) Marina Erakovic (quarterfinals)
2. (United States) Alexa Glatch / (United States) Vania King (final)
3. (Romania) Mihaela Buzărnescu / (Romania) Alexandra Dulgheru (quarterfinals)
4. (Georgia (country)) Anna Tatishvili / (Denmark) Caroline Wozniacki (quarterfinals)
5. (Chinese Taipei) Wen-Hsin Hsu / (Kazakhstan) Amina Rakhim (semifinals)
6. (United States) Jennifer-Lee Heinser / (United States) Elizabeth Plotkin (first round)
7. (Czech Republic) Nikola Fraňková / (Russia) Alisa Kleybanova (champions)
8. (Poland) Agnieszka Radwańska / (Poland) Urszula Radwańska (first round)

== Draw ==
Key

- Q = Qualifier
- WC = Wild card
- LL = Lucky loser
- Alt = Alternate
- ITF = ITF entry
- PR = Protected ranking
- SR = Special ranking
- SE = Special exempt
- JE = Junior exempt
- JR = Junior Accelerator Programme entrant
- CO = College Accelerator Programme entrant
- NG = Next Gen Accelerator Program entrant
- w/o = Walkover
- r = Retired
- d = Defaulted

=== Finals ===
Semifinals
(Belarus) Mary Govortsova (Netherlands) Bibiane Schoofs | 6^{6} | 3
7 | (Czech Republic) Nikola Fraňková (Russia) Alisa Kleybanova | 7^{8} | 6
5 | (Chinese Taipei) Wen-Hsin Hsu (Kazakhstan) Amina Rakhim | 3 | 2
2 | (United States) Alexa Glatch (United States) Vania King | 6 | 6

Final
7 | (Czech Republic) Nikola Fraňková (Russia) Alisa Kleybanova | 7 | 7^{7}
2 | (United States) Alexa Glatch (United States) Vania King | 5 | 6^{3}

=== Top half ===
First round
1 | (Belarus) Victoria Azarenka (New Zealand) Marina Erakovic | 6 | 6
(United States) Andrea Remynse (United States) Yasmin Schnack | 2 | 1
(Slovakia) Dominika Cibulková (Russia) Ekaterina Kosminskaya | 3 | 0
(Netherlands) Marrit Boonstra (Netherlands) Renée Reinhard | 6 | 6
(United States) Julia Cohen (United States) Mary Gambale | 6 | 1 | 1
(Belarus) Mary Govortsova (Netherlands) Bibiane Schoofs | 4 | 6 | 6
(Chile) Liset Brito-Herrera (Brazil) Roxane Vaisemberg | 7 | 7
6 | (United States) Jennifer-Lee Heinser (United States) Elizabeth Plotkin | 5 | 5
3 | (Romania) Mihaela Buzărnescu (Romania) Alexandra Dulgheru | 6 | 6
(United States) Lauren Albanese (United States) Jennifer Stevens | 4 | 3
(United States) Yvette Hyndman (Canada) Jillian O'Neill | 6 | 6
(Austria) Anna Bartenstein (United States) Ellah Nze | 4 | 2
(Czech Republic) Kateřina Kramperová (Czech Republic) Kateřina Vaňková | 6 | 6
(Romania) Bianca-Ioana Bonifate (Brazil) Ana-Clara Duarte | 2 | 3
WC | (United States) Brittany Augustine (United States) Madison Brengle | 2 | 1
7 | (Czech Republic) Nikola Fraňková (Russia) Alisa Kleybanova | 6 | 6

Second round
1 | (Belarus) V Azarenka (New Zealand) M Erakovic | 6 | 6
(Netherlands) M Boonstra (Netherlands) R Reinhard | 1 | 1
(Belarus) M Govortsova (Netherlands) B Schoofs | 7 | 4 | 6
(Chile) L Brito-Herrera (Brazil) R Vaisemberg | 5 | 6 | 4
3 | (Romania) M Buzărnescu (Romania) A Dulgheru | 4 | 6 | 6
(United States) Y Hyndman (Canada) J O'Neill | 6 | 4 | 3
(Czech Republic) K Kramperová (Czech Republic) K Vaňková | 6 | 4 | 3
7 | (Czech Republic) N Fraňková (Russia) A Kleybanova | 4 | 6 | 6

Quarterfinals
1 | (Belarus) V Azarenka (New Zealand) M Erakovic
(Belarus) M Govortsova (Netherlands) B Schoofs | w/o
3 | (Romania) M Buzărnescu (Romania) A Dulgheru | 3 | 5
7 | (Czech Republic) N Fraňková (Russia) A Kleybanova | 6 | 7

Semifinals
(Belarus) M Govortsova (Netherlands) B Schoofs | 6^{6} | 3
7 | (Czech Republic) N Fraňková (Russia) A Kleybanova | 7^{8} | 6

=== Bottom half ===
First round
5 | (Chinese Taipei) Wen-Hsin Hsu (Kazakhstan) Amina Rakhim | 6 | 6
WC | (United States) Jamie Hampton (United States) Lyndsay Kinstler | 3 | 4
(United States) Ruo-Qi Li (Canada) Valérie Tétreault | 6 | 4 | 4
(Sweden) Michaela Johansson (Sweden) Johanna Larsson | 2 | 6 | 6
WC | (United States) Gail Brodsky (Belarus) Ksenia Milevskaya | 2 | 3
(Germany) Nina Henkel (Germany) Dominice Ripoll | 6 | 6
WC | (United States) Lindsay Burdette (United States) Mallory Burdette | 6 | 2 | 6^{5}
4 | (Georgia (country)) Anna Tatishvili (Denmark) Caroline Wozniacki | 2 | 6 | 7^{7}
8 | (Poland) Agnieszka Radwańska (Poland) Urszula Radwańska | 6 | 1 | 5
(Japan) Ayumi Morita (Japan) Erika Sema | 4 | 6 | 7
(United States) Megan Alexander (United States) Chelsey Gullickson | 2 | 0
(Romania) Sorana Cîrstea (Russia) Anastasia Pavlyuchenkova | 6 | 6
(United States) Kristen Mcvitty (United States) Ashley Weinhold | 2 | 6 | 6
(Italy) Astrid Besser (Netherlands) Stephanie Herz | 6 | 4 | 1
(United Kingdom) Jade Curtis (Canada) Sharon Fichman | 3 | 6 | 2
2 | (United States) Alexa Glatch (United States) Vania King | 6 | 4 | 6

Second round
5 | (Chinese Taipei) W-H Hsu (Kazakhstan) A Rakhim | 6 | 6
(Sweden) M Johansson (Sweden) J Larsson | 0 | 0
(Germany) N Henkel (Germany) D Ripoll | 2 | 3
4 | (Georgia (country)) A Tatishvili (Denmark) C Wozniacki | 6 | 6
(Japan) A Morita (Japan) E Sema | 6 | 6
(Romania) S Cîrstea (Russia) A Pavlyuchenkova | 1 | 4
(United States) K Mcvitty (United States) A Weinhold | 2 | 4
2 | (United States) A Glatch (United States) V King | 6 | 6

Quarterfinals
5 | (Chinese Taipei) W-H Hsu (Kazakhstan) A Rakhim | 5 | 6 | 7
4 | (Georgia (country)) A Tatishvili (Denmark) C Wozniacki | 7 | 0 | 5
(Japan) A Morita (Japan) E Sema | 4 | 3
2 | (United States) A Glatch (United States) V King | 6 | 6

Semifinals
5 | (Chinese Taipei) W-H Hsu (Kazakhstan) A Rakhim | 3 | 2
2 | (United States) A Glatch (United States) V King | 6 | 6
