= 2005 US Open – Girls' singles =

Girls' singles
- 2005 US Open

Final
- Champion: (Belarus) Victoria Azarenka
- Runner-up: (United States) Alexa Glatch
- Score: 6–3, 6–4

Events
| Singles | men | women | | boys | girls |
| Doubles | men | women | mixed | boys | girls |
| WC Singles | men | women | quad |
| WC Doubles | men | women | quad |
| Legends | men | women | mixed |
- US Open

The United States Open Tennis Championships is a hardcourt tennis tournament held annually at Flushing Meadows, starting on the last Monday in August and lasting for two weeks. The tournament consists of five main championship events: men's and women's singles, men's and women's doubles, and mixed doubles, with additional tournaments for seniors, juniors, and wheelchair players.

The event was won by Victoria Azarenka of Belarus who beat Alexa Glatch of the United States, 6–3, 6–4 in the final.

== Seeds ==
1. (Belarus) Victoria Azarenka (champion)
2. (Poland) Agnieszka Radwańska (second round)
3. (Slovakia) Dominika Cibulková (quarterfinals)
4. (Denmark) Caroline Wozniacki (first round)
5. (Romania) Alexandra Dulgheru (first round)
6. (New Zealand) Marina Erakovic (quarterfinals)
7. (United States) Alexa Glatch (final)
8. (United States) Mary Gambale (second round)
9. (Russia) Ekaterina Makarova (third round)
10. (United States) Vania King (third round)
11. (Chinese Taipei) Wen-Hsin Hsu (third round)
12. (Japan) Ayumi Morita (first round)
13. (Netherlands) Bibiane Schoofs (third round)
14. (Romania) Mihaela Buzărnescu (semifinals)
15. (United States) Jennifer-Lee Heinser (first round)
16. (Kazakhstan) Amina Rakhim (first round)

== Draw ==
Key

- Q = Qualifier
- WC = Wild card
- LL = Lucky loser
- Alt = Alternate
- ITF = ITF entry
- PR = Protected ranking
- SR = Special ranking
- SE = Special exempt
- JE = Junior exempt
- JR = Junior Accelerator Programme entrant
- CO = College Accelerator Programme entrant
- NG = Next Gen Accelerator Program entrant
- w/o = Walkover
- r = Retired
- d = Defaulted

=== Finals ===
Quarterfinals
1 | (Belarus) Victoria Azarenka | 5
6 | (Australia) Marina Erakovic | 2^{r}
14 | (Romania) Mihaela Buzărnescu | 6 | 7^{7}
Q | (Belarus) Olga Govortsova | 2 | 6^{3}
7 | (United States) Alexa Glatch | 6 | 6
3 | (Slovakia) Dominika Cibulková | 0 | 4
(Germany) Nina Henkel | 7 | 7
(United States) Elizabeth Plotkin | 5 | 5

Semifinals
1 | (Belarus) Victoria Azarenka | 3 | 6 | 6
14 | (Romania) Mihaela Buzărnescu | 6 | 2 | 2
7 | (United States) Alexa Glatch | 6 | 7
(Germany) Nina Henkel | 1 | 5

Final
1 | (Belarus) Victoria Azarenka | 6 | 6
7 | (United States) Alexa Glatch | 3 | 4

=== Top half ===
==== Section 1 ====
First round
1 | (Belarus) Victoria Azarenka | 6 | 6
SE | (Russia) Alexandra Panova | 2 | 1
Q | (United States) Jennifer Stevens | 3 | 2
(Czech Republic) Kateřina Kramperová | 6 | 6
(Netherlands) Renée Reinhard | 6 | 7^{7}
Q | (Russia) Anastasia Pavlyuchenkova | 3 | 6^{4}
(United States) Julia Cohen | 6 | 7
16 | (Kazakhstan) Amina Rakhim | 1 | 5
10 | (United States) Vania King | 6 | 6
Q | (Canada) Jillian O'Neill | 0 | 0
WC | (United States) Madison Brengle | 6 | 3 | 6
(Poland) Urszula Radwańska | 0 | 6 | 1
WC | (United States) Gail Brodsky | 6 | 6
(Germany) Dominice Ripoll | 1 | 4
(United States) Yasmin Schnack | 3 | 2
6 | (New Zealand) Marina Erakovic | 6 | 6

Second round
1 | (Belarus) V Azarenka | 6 | 6
(Czech Republic) K Kramperová | 1 | 2
(Netherlands) R Reinhard | 1 | 6 | 6
(United States) J Cohen | 6 | 4 | 0
10 | (United States) V King | 6 | 6
WC | (United States) M Brengle | 1 | 0
WC | (United States) G Brodsky | 1 | 1
6 | (New Zealand) M Erakovic | 6 | 6

Third round
1 | (Belarus) V Azarenka | 6 | 6
(Netherlands) R Reinhard | 0 | 0
10 | (United States) V King | 3 | 6 | 6^{2}
6 | (New Zealand) M Erakovic | 6 | 3 | 7^{7}

Quarterfinals
1 | (Belarus) V Azarenka | 5
6 | (New Zealand) M Erakovic | 2^{r}

==== Section 2 ====
First round
4 | (Denmark) Caroline Wozniacki | 2 | 6 | 4
WC | (United States) Jamie Hampton | 6 | 2 | 6
WC | (United States) Lauren Albanese | 6 | 3 | 1
(Russia) Yaroslava Shvedova | 1 | 6 | 6
(Netherlands) Stephanie Herz | 7^{7} | 2 | 2
(Georgia (country)) Anna Tatishvili | 6^{4} | 6 | 6
Q | (Austria) Anna Bartenstein | 1 | 4
14 | (Romania) Mihaela Buzărnescu | 6 | 6
12 | (Japan) Ayumi Morita | 4 | 4
Q | (Belarus) Olga Govortsova | 6 | 6
WC | (United States) Lindsay Burdette | 3 | 1
Q | (Sweden) Johanna Larsson | 6 | 6
(Brazil) Roxane Vaisemberg | 1 | 2
(Canada) Sharon Fichman | 6 | 6
(Chile) Liset Brito-Herrera | 6^{2} | 3
8 | (United States) Mary Gambale | 7^{7} | 6

Second round
WC | (United States) J Hampton | 6 | 3 | 0
(Russia) Y Shvedova | 3 | 6 | 6
(Georgia (country)) A Tatishvili | 2 | 4
14 | (Romania) M Buzărnescu | 6 | 6
Q | (Belarus) O Govortsova | 7^{8} | 6
Q | (Sweden) J Larsson | 6^{6} | 4
(Canada) S Fichman | 0 | 7 | 6
8 | (United States) M Gambale | 6 | 5 | 4

Third round
(Russia) Y Shvedova | 3 | 3
14 | (Romania) M Buzărnescu | 6 | 6
Q | (Belarus) O Govortsova | 6 | 6
(Canada) S Fichman | 4 | 4

Quarterfinals
14 | (Romania) M Buzărnescu | 6 | 7^{7}
Q | (Belarus) O Govortsova | 2 | 6^{3}

=== Bottom half ===
==== Section 3 ====
First round
7 | (United States) Alexa Glatch | 6 | 6
(Australia) Olivia Lukaszewicz | 3 | 1
(Italy) Astrid Besser | 4 | 3
(Canada) Valérie Tétreault | 6 | 6
LL | (Japan) Erika Sema | 7^{10} | 6
SE | (United Kingdom) Jade Curtis | 6^{8} | 3
Q | (United States) Kristen Mcvitty | 3 | 5
9 | (Russia) Ekaterina Makarova | 6 | 7
13 | (Netherlands) Bibiane Schoofs | 6 | 6
(Brazil) Ana-Clara Duarte | 2 | 4
(United States) Ellah Nze | 1 | 3
(Czech Republic) Kateřina Vaňková | 6 | 6
WC | (United States) Lyndsay Kinstler | 1 | 1
(Sweden) Michaela Johansson | 6 | 6
WC | (United States) Chelsey Gullickson | 5 | 3
3 | (Slovakia) Dominika Cibulková | 7 | 6

Second round
7 | (United States) A Glatch | 6 | 6
(Canada) V Tétreault | 2 | 1
LL | (Japan) E Sema | 1 | 2
9 | (Russia) E Makarova | 6 | 6
13 | (Netherlands) B Schoofs | 7^{7} | 5 | 6
(Czech Republic) K Vaňková | 6^{2} | 7 | 3
(Sweden) M Johansson | 6 | 3 | 3
3 | (Slovakia) D Cibulková | 3 | 6 | 6

Third round
7 | (United States) A Glatch | 7^{7} | 1 | 6
9 | (Russia) E Makarova | 6^{2} | 6 | 3
13 | (Netherlands) B Schoofs | 3 | 5
3 | (Slovakia) D Cibulková | 6 | 7

Quarterfinals
7 | (United States) A Glatch | 6 | 6
3 | (Slovakia) D Cibulková | 0 | 4

==== Section 4 ====
First round
5 | (Romania) Alexandra Dulgheru | 6 | 6^{6} | 4
(Russia) Alisa Kleybanova | 4 | 7^{8} | 6
(Germany) Nina Henkel | 6 | 6
Q | (Belarus) Ksenia Milevskaya | 2 | 1
Q | (United States) Ashley Weinhold | 6^{3} | 3
(Romania) Sorana Cîrstea | 7^{7} | 6
(United States) Andrea Remynse | 1 | 2
11 | (Chinese Taipei) Wen-Hsin Hsu | 6 | 6
15 | (United States) Jennifer-Lee Heinser | 2 | 5
(Czech Republic) Nikola Fraňková | 6 | 7
WC | (United States) Sarah Fansler | 5 | 6 | 2
Q | (Russia) Ekaterina Kosminskaya | 7 | 3 | 6
(United States) Elizabeth Plotkin | 7^{7} | 7^{7}
(Netherlands) Marrit Boonstra | 6^{2} | 6^{3}
LL | (United States) Megan Alexander | 1 | 0
2 | (Poland) Agnieszka Radwańska | 6 | 6

Second round
(Russia) A Kleybanova | 3 | 4
(Germany) N Henkel | 6 | 6
(Romania) S Cîrstea | 4 | 6 | 4
11 | (Chinese Taipei) W-H Hsu | 6 | 4 | 6
(Czech Republic) N Fraňková | 4 | 3
Q | (Russia) E Kosminskaya | 6 | 6
(United States) E Plotkin | 6 | 6
2 | (Poland) A Radwańska | 4 | 4

Third round
(Germany) N Henkel | 7 | 1 | 7
11 | (Chinese Taipei) W-H Hsu | 5 | 6 | 5
Q | (Russia) E Kosminskaya | 3 | 4
(United States) E Plotkin | 6 | 6

Quarterfinals
(Germany) N Henkel | 7 | 7
(United States) E Plotkin | 5 | 5
