= Ekaterina Kosminskaya =

Russian tennis player

- Native name: Екатерина Косминская
- Country (sports): Russia
- Born: 24 June 1988 (age 36); Moscow, Russia
- Plays: Right-handed (two-handed backhand)
- College: Penn Quakers

Singles

Grand Slam singles results
- Australian Open Junior: 2R (2005
- French Open Junior: 2R (2004)
- Wimbledon Junior: 3R (2005)
- US Open Junior: 3R (2004, 2005)

Doubles

Grand Slam doubles results
- Australian Open Junior: SF (2004)
- French Open Junior: 2R (2004)
- Wimbledon Junior: 1R (2004, 2005)
- US Open Junior: 1R (2004, 2005)

Ekaterina Kosminskaya (Russian: Екатерина Косминская; born 24 June 1988) is a former professional tennis player from Russia.

== Early life ==
Ekaterina was born to Petr and Irina Kosminskaya on 24 June 1988 in Moscow, Soviet Union. Boris Yeltsin received a scholarship for tennis from her foundation. Ekaterina Kosminskaya At age five or six she was sent by her parents to the Luzhniki per the attending the sports club there, coached by her Irina Granaturova.

== Career ==
Kosminskaya had a successful junior career, Her career-high world doubles ranking as a junior was world No. 10. In 2003 Kosminskaya won a prestigious tournament for juniors Orange Bowl partnering Marina Erakovic (Grade A). She has won 1 doubles titles on the ITF Women's Circuit.

She decided to follow the college route and was part of the Penn Quakers tennis team from 2006 to 2009.

== ITF junior results ==
=== Singles (2–0) ===
Legend (Win/Loss)
Category GA
Category G1
Category G2
Category G3
Category G4
Category G5

Result	No.	Date	Location	Grade	Surface	Opponent	Score
Win	1.	March 2003	Haslevangen, Norway	G4	Carpet	(Sweden) Michaela Johansson	6–2, 6–2
Win	2.	October 2003	Bangkok, Thailand	G2	Hard	(New Zealand) Marina Erakovic	7–6, 4–6, 6–4

=== Doubles (7–4) ===
Result	No.	Date	Location	Grade	Surface	Partner	Opponents	Score
Win	1.	May 2002	Alicante, Spain	G5	Hard	(Russia) Ekaterina Makarova	(South Africa) Susan Delport (South Africa) Mandy Septoe	2–6, 6–3, 6–3
Win	2.	January 2003	Västerås, Sweden	G4	Carpet	(Russia) Anna Chakvetadze	(United Kingdom) Georgia Smith (United Kingdom) Melanie South	6–4, 6–0
Win	3.	March 2003	Udmurtia, Russia	G4	Hard	(Russia) Ekaterina Makarova	(Russia) Alexandra Panova (Russia) Olga Panova	6–2, 5–7, 6–4
Win	4.	May 2003	Prato, Italy	G2	Clay	(Russia) Ekaterina Makarova	(Russia) Ekaterina Kirianova (Russia) Irina Kotkina	6–1, 6–4
Loss	1.	July 2003	Essen, Germany	G1	Clay	(Russia) Ekaterina Makarova	(Netherlands) Kelly de Beer (Czech Republic) Nikola Fraňková	3–6, 6–7
Loss	2.	August 2003	Domžale, Slovenia	G3	Clay	(Slovenia) Anja Poglajen	(Slovenia) Tina Obrez (Slovenia) Romina Raonic	6–2, 4–6, 1–6
Loss	3.	December 2003	Key Biscayne, Florida, USA	G1	Hard	(New Zealand) Marina Erakovic	(Czech Republic) Andrea Hlaváčková (Finland) Emma Laine	6–7, 4–6
Win	5.	December 2003	Orange Bowl, Miami, USA	GA	Hard	(New Zealand) Marina Erakovic	(Belarus) Victoria Azarenka (Belarus) Olga Govortsova	6–0, 4–6, 7–6
Win	6.	May 2004	Salsomaggiore Terme, Italy	G2	Clay	(Russia) Ekaterina Makarova	(Italy) Giulia Gabba (Italy) Verdiana Verardi	1–6, 6–2, 6–2
Loss	4.	May 2004	Charleroi, Belgium	G1	Clay	(Russia) Alla Kudryavtseva	(Canada) Stéphanie Dubois (United States) Yasmin Schnack	5–7, 3–6
Win	7.	Sep 2005	Lexington, USA	G1	Hard	(Russia) Alisa Kleybanova	(United States) Julia Cohen (Russia) Anastasia Pavlyuchenkova	7–5, 7–6
