= 2005 US Open (tennis) =

- Date: August 29 – September 11
- Edition: 125th
- Category: Grand Slam (ITF)
- Surface: Hardcourt
- Location: New York City, U.S.
- Venue: USTA Billie Jean King National Tennis Center

Champions

Men's singles
- (Switzerland) Roger Federer

Women's singles
- (Belgium) Kim Clijsters

Men's doubles
- (United States) Bob Bryan / (United States) Mike Bryan

Women's doubles
- (United States) Lisa Raymond / (Australia) Samantha Stosur

Mixed doubles
- (Slovakia) Daniela Hantuchová / (India) Mahesh Bhupathi

Wheelchair men's singles
- (Netherlands) Robin Ammerlaan

Wheelchair women's singles
- (Netherlands) Esther Vergeer

Wheelchair men's doubles
- (Netherlands) Robin Ammerlaan / (France) Michaël Jérémiasz

Wheelchair women's doubles
- (Netherlands) Korie Homan / (Netherlands) Esther Vergeer

Boys' singles
- (The Bahamas) Ryan Sweeting

Girls' singles
- (Belarus) Victoria Azarenka

Boys' doubles
- (United States) Alex Clayton / (United States) Donald Young

Girls' doubles
- (Czech Republic) Nikola Fraňková / (Russia) Alisa Kleybanova
- US Open

The 2005 US Open was the fourth and final Grand Slam of 2005. It was held between August 29, 2005, and September 11, 2005.

Roger Federer was successful in defending his 2004 title, defeating Andre Agassi in the final. Svetlana Kuznetsova was unsuccessful in her title defense, losing in the first round against compatriot Ekaterina Bychkova. Kim Clijsters won her first Grand Slam title after four previous Grand Slam final losses. It was the first of three US Open titles for Clijsters, also winning in 2009 and 2010. This was the first time that future US Open (Tennis) champion Andy Murray was featured in the tournament.

== Seniors ==
=== Men's singles ===
(Switzerland) Roger Federer defeating (United States) Andre Agassi, 6–3, 2–6, 7–6(1), 6–1

- It was Federer's 10th title of the year, and his 32nd overall. It was his 6th career Grand Slam title, and his 2nd (consecutive) US Open title.

=== Women's singles ===
(Belgium) Kim Clijsters defeating (France) Mary Pierce, 6–3, 6–1

- It was Clijsters's 7th title of the year, and her 28th overall. It was her 1st career Grand Slam title.

=== Men's doubles ===
(United States) Bob Bryan / (United States) Mike Bryan defeating (Sweden) Jonas Björkman / (Belarus) Max Mirnyi, 6–1, 6–4

=== Women's doubles ===
(United States) Lisa Raymond / (Australia) Samantha Stosur defeating (Russia) Elena Dementieva / (Italy) Flavia Pennetta, 6–2, 5–7, 6–3

=== Mixed doubles ===
(Slovakia) Daniela Hantuchová / (India) Mahesh Bhupathi defeating (Slovenia) Katarina Srebotnik / (Serbia and Montenegro) Nenad Zimonjić, 6–4, 6–2

== Juniors ==
=== Boys' singles ===
(The Bahamas) Ryan Sweeting defeating (France) Jérémy Chardy, 6–4, 6–4

=== Girls' singles ===
(Belarus) Victoria Azarenka defeating (United States) Alexa Glatch, 6–3, 6–4

=== Boys' doubles ===
(United States) Alex Clayton / (United States) Donald Young defeating (Australia) Carsten Ball / (Netherlands) Thiemo de Bakker, 7–6(3), 4–6, 7–5

=== Girls' doubles ===
(Czech Republic) Nikola Fraňková / (Russia) Alisa Kleybanova defeating (United States) Alexa Glatch / (United States) Vania King, 7–5, 7–6(3)

== Seeds ==
=== Top 10 seeds (singles) ===
Men's singles
1.	(Switzerland) Roger Federer	defeated	(United States) Andre Agassi (7th seed)	Final
2.	(Spain) Rafael Nadal	lost to	(United States) James Blake	3rd round
3.	(Australia) Lleyton Hewitt	lost to	(Switzerland) Roger Federer (1st seed)	Semifinal
4.	(United States) Andy Roddick	lost to	(Luxembourg) Gilles Müller	1st round
6.	(Russia) Nikolay Davydenko	lost to	(Thailand) Paradorn Srichaphan	2nd round
7.	(United States) Andre Agassi	lost to	(Switzerland) Roger Federer (1st seed)	Final
8.	(Argentina) Guillermo Coria	lost to	(United States) Robby Ginepri	Quarterfinal
9.	(Argentina) Gastón Gaudio	lost to	(United States) Brian Baker	1st round
10.	(Argentina) Mariano Puerta	lost to	(Switzerland) Stanislas Wawrinka	2nd round
11.	(Argentina) David Nalbandian	lost to	(Switzerland) Roger Federer (1st seed)	Quarterfinal
* Fifth seed Marat Safin (Russia) withdrew before the start of the tournament.
Women's singles
1.	(Russia) Maria Sharapova	lost to	(Belgium) Kim Clijsters (4th seed)	Semifinal
2.	(United States) Lindsay Davenport	lost to	(Russia) Elena Dementieva (6th seed)	Quarterfinal
3.	(France) Amélie Mauresmo	lost to	(France) Mary Pierce (12th seed)	Quarterfinal
4.	(Belgium) Kim Clijsters	defeated	(France) Mary Pierce (12th seed)	Final
5.	(Russia) Svetlana Kuznetsova	lost to	(Russia) Ekaterina Bychkova	1st round
6.	(Russia) Elena Dementieva	lost to	(France) Mary Pierce (12th seed)	Semifinal
7.	(Belgium) Justine Henin-Hardenne	lost to	(France) Mary Pierce (12th seed)	4th round
8.	(United States) Serena Williams	lost to	(United States) Venus Williams (10th seed)	4th round
9.	(Russia) Nadia Petrova	lost to	(Russia) Maria Sharapova (1st seed)	Quarterfinal
10.	(United States) Venus Williams	lost to	(Belgium) Kim Clijsters (4th seed)	Quarterfinal

More information on the top 32 seeds here.

=== Top 5 seeds (men's doubles) ===
Men's doubles
1.	(Sweden) Jonas Björkman (Belarus) Max Mirnyi	lost to	(United States) Mike Bryan (United States) Bob Bryan	Final
2.	(United States) Mike Bryan (United States) Bob Bryan	defeated	(Sweden) Jonas Björkman (Belarus) Max Mirnyi	Final
3.	(The Bahamas) Mark Knowles (Canada) Daniel Nestor	lost to	(United States) Paul Goldstein (United States) Jim Thomas	1st round
4.	(Zimbabwe) Wayne Black (Zimbabwe) Kevin Ullyett	lost to	(Sweden) Jonas Björkman (Belarus) Max Mirnyi	Semifinals
5.	(India) Leander Paes (Serbia and Montenegro) Nenad Zimonjić	lost to	(United States) Amer Delić (United States) Jeff Morrison	1st round

=== Top 5 seeds (women's doubles) ===
Women's doubles
1.	(Zimbabwe) Cara Black (Australia) Rennae Stubbs	lost to	(United States) Lisa Raymond (Australia) Samantha Stosur	Quarterfinals
2.	(Russia) Svetlana Kuznetsova (Australia) Alicia Molik	lost to	(Germany) Anna-Lena Grönefeld (United States) Martina Navratilova	Quarterfinals
3.	(Spain) Conchita Martínez (Spain) Virginia Ruano Pascual	lost to	(United States) Lisa Raymond (Australia) Samantha Stosur	Semifinals
4.	(Russia) Nadia Petrova (United States) Meghann Shaughnessy	lost to	(Russia) Elena Dementieva (Italy) Flavia Pennetta	3rd round
5.	(Slovakia) Daniela Hantuchová (Japan) Ai Sugiyama	lost to	(China) Yan Zi (China) Zheng Jie	3rd round

=== Top 5 seeds (mixed doubles) ===
Mixed doubles
1.	(Zimbabwe) Cara Black (Zimbabwe) Wayne Black	lost to	(Russia) Dinara Safina (Israel) Andy Ram	2nd round
2.	(Australia) Rennae Stubbs (United States) Bob Bryan	lost to	(United States) Corina Morariu (United States) Mike Bryan	Quarterfinals
3.	(Russia) Elena Likhovtseva (Canada) Daniel Nestor	lost to	(Slovenia) Katarina Srebotnik (Serbia and Montenegro) Nenad Zimonjić	2nd round
4.	(United States) Lisa Raymond (Sweden) Jonas Björkman	lost to	(Slovakia) Daniela Hantuchová (India) Mahesh Bhupathi	2nd round
5.	(Japan) Ai Sugiyama (Zimbabwe) Kevin Ullyett	lost to	(Slovakia) Daniela Hantuchová (India) Mahesh Bhupathi	Quarterfinals

== Withdrawals ==
Men's singles

- (Argentina) Guillermo Cañas → replaced by (Belgium) Dick Norman
- (Sweden) Joachim Johansson → replaced by (Slovakia) Karol Kučera
- (Russia) Marat Safin → replaced by (Germany) Björn Phau

Women's singles

- (Russia) Elena Bovina → replaced by (Switzerland) Emmanuelle Gagliardi
- (Netherlands) Michaëlla Krajicek → replaced by (Russia) Ekaterina Bychkova
- (Russia) Vera Zvonareva → replaced by (Spain) María Sánchez Lorenzo

== Highlights ==
- Day 1
  - Defending champion Svetlana Kuznetsova of Russia became the first defending women's champion to lose in the first round during the Open Era. She lost to Ekaterina Bychkova 6–3, 6–4. It marked the fourth time a women's defending champion was ousted in her first match.
  - Ninth-seeded Gastón Gaudio (2004 French Open champion) also lost in the first round. He was beaten by wildcard Brian Baker in straight sets: 7–6(9), 6–2, 6–4.
- Day 2
  - 2003 Champion Andy Roddick lost to Gilles Müller 7–6, 7–6, 7–6.
- Day 3
- Day 4
  - Indian teen sensation Sania Mirza became the first Indian woman to reach the 4th round of any Grand Slam.
- Day 5
- Day 6
  - American James Blake takes out No. 2 seed – and one of the candidates to win the title – Rafael Nadal of Spain. James Blake declared the player of the day for the 2nd time in the tournament.
- Day 7
  - Tenth seed Venus Williams beats her little sister and 2005 Australian Open champion Serena Williams to reach the quarter-finals, (7-6, 6–2). It was only the second time (after their second round meeting at the 1998 Australian Open) that the sisters met before the quarter-finals of a Grand Slam tournament.
- Day 8
  - Andre Agassi is stretched to five sets against Belgian Xavier Malisse.
- Day 9
  - Roger Federer loses his first set of the tournament against Nicolas Kiefer of Germany. He progresses in four sets.
  - Kim Clijsters of Belgium continues to dominate the hardcourt summer. Her victim in the quarter-final was Venus Williams. Clijsters wins 4–6, 7-5 and 6–1.
- Day 10
  - Both Andre Agassi and Robby Ginepri needed five difficult sets to beat James Blake and Guillermo Coria in their quarter-final matches.
  - Second seed Lindsay Davenport loses in three sets to Russian Elena Dementieva and for the first time since 1994 there are no American representatives in the women's semifinals.
- Day 11
  - Daniela Hantuchová and Mahesh Bhupathi are champions in Mixed doubles against Katarina Srebotnik and Nenad Zimonjić.
- Day 12
  - Twin brothers Mike and Bob Bryan, after being runners-up at the other three Grand Slams, are champions for the first time in the US Open in the men's doubles championship, winning the 1st seed Jonas Björkman and Max Mirnyi.
- Day 13
  - Kim Clijsters wins her first Grand Slam title after defeating Mary Pierce in 6–3, 6–1.
- Day 14
  - Roger Federer wins the title defeating Andre Agassi in four sets.

== Player of the day ==
- Day 1 – (United States) Brian Baker for upset defeat of (Argentina) Gastón Gaudio
- Day 2 – (United States) James Blake for a comeback after injury-marred 2004
- Day 3 – (India) Sania Mirza for winning the match despite bleeding toes
- Day 4 – (United States) Andre Agassi for second most wins in the US Open history
- Day 5 – (Czech Republic) Nicole Vaidišová for a personal best performance in a Grand Slam Tourney
- Day 6 – (United States) James Blake for defeating No. 2 seed (Spain) Rafael Nadal
- Day 7 – (United States) Venus Williams for defeating sister (United States) Serena Williams
- Day 8 – (Argentina) Guillermo Coria on winning the longest match (4 & 1/2 hours) of 2005 US open
- Day 9 – (Finland) Jarkko Nieminen for becoming the first Finnish man to reach the quarter-finals of a grand slam
- Day 10 – (France) Mary Pierce for a great comeback and making it to the US Open Semifinal for the 1st time
- Day 11 – (Slovakia) Daniela Hantuchová and (India) Mahesh Bhupathi for winning the mixed doubles title
- Day 12 – (United States) Mike and (United States) Bob Bryan for winning their first men's doubles title
- Day 13 – (Belgium) Kim Clijsters for capturing her first Grand Slam singles title
- Day 14 – (Switzerland) Roger Federer for capturing the men's singles title

== Notes ==
Preceded by 2005 Wimbledon Championships	Grand Slams	Succeeded by 2006 Australian Open
