= 2005 US Open – Men's doubles =

Men's doubles
- 2005 US Open

Final
- Champion: (United States) Bob Bryan (United States) Mike Bryan
- Runner-up: (Sweden) Jonas Björkman (Belarus) Max Mirnyi
- Score: 6–1, 6–4

Details
- Draw: 64
- Seeds: 16

Events
Singles	men	women		boys	girls
Doubles	men	women	mixed	boys	girls
WC Singles	men	women	quad
WC Doubles	men	women	quad
Legends	men	women	mixed
- US Open

Mark Knowles and Daniel Nestor were the defending champions, but lost in the first round to Paul Goldstein and Jim Thomas.

Bob Bryan and Mike Bryan won the title, defeating Jonas Björkman and Max Mirnyi 6–1, 6–4 in the final.

== Seeds ==
1. (Sweden) Jonas Björkman / (Belarus) Max Mirnyi (final)
2. (United States) Bob Bryan / (United States) Mike Bryan (champions)
3. (The Bahamas) Mark Knowles / (Canada) Daniel Nestor (first round)
4. (Zimbabwe) Wayne Black / (Zimbabwe) Kevin Ullyett (semifinals)
5. (India) Leander Paes / (Serbia and Montenegro) Nenad Zimonjić (first round)
6. (France) Michaël Llodra / (France) Fabrice Santoro (first round)
7. (India) Mahesh Bhupathi / (Czech Republic) Martin Damm (third round)
8. (Australia) Wayne Arthurs / (Australia) Paul Hanley (third round)
9. (Sweden) Simon Aspelin / (Australia) Todd Perry (quarterfinals)
10. (Czech Republic) František Čermák / (Czech Republic) Leoš Friedl (second round)
11. (Israel) Jonathan Erlich / (Israel) Andy Ram (quarterfinals)
12. (Czech Republic) Cyril Suk / (Czech Republic) Pavel Vízner (quarterfinals)
13. (Australia) Stephen Huss / (South Africa) Wesley Moodie (first round)
14. (Argentina) Gastón Etlis / (Argentina) Martín Rodríguez (first round)
15. (Chile) Fernando González / (Chile) Nicolás Massú (third round)
16. (Argentina) Lucas Arnold / (Czech Republic) Petr Pála (first round)

== Draw ==
Key

- Q = Qualifier
- WC = Wild card
- LL = Lucky loser
- Alt = Alternate
- ITF = ITF entry
- PR = Protected ranking
- SR = Special ranking
- SE = Special exempt
- JE = Junior exempt
- JR = Junior Accelerator Programme entrant
- CO = College Accelerator Programme entrant
- NG = Next Gen Accelerator Program entrant
- w/o = Walkover
- r = Retired
- d = Defaulted

=== Finals ===
Quarterfinals
1	(Sweden) Jonas Björkman (Belarus) Max Mirnyi	6	6
12	(Czech Republic) Cyril Suk (Czech Republic) Pavel Vízner	4	3
4	(Zimbabwe) Wayne Black (Zimbabwe) Kevin Ullyett	6	6
11	(Israel) Jonathan Erlich (Israel) Andy Ram	4	2
9	(Sweden) Simon Aspelin (Australia) Todd Perry	6	4	6^{14}
(United States) Paul Goldstein (United States) Jim Thomas	4	6	7^{16}
(France) Julien Benneteau (France) Nicolas Mahut	3	4
2	(United States) Bob Bryan (United States) Mike Bryan	6	6

Semifinals
1	(Sweden) Jonas Björkman (Belarus) Max Mirnyi	5	7	6
4	(Zimbabwe) Wayne Black (Zimbabwe) Kevin Ullyett	7	5	2
(United States) Paul Goldstein (United States) Jim Thomas	6	1	2
2	(United States) Bob Bryan (United States) Mike Bryan	3	6	6

Final
1	(Sweden) Jonas Björkman (Belarus) Max Mirnyi	1	4
2	(United States) Bob Bryan (United States) Mike Bryan	6	6

=== Top half ===
==== Section 1 ====
First round
1	(Sweden) J Björkman (Belarus) M Mirnyi	6	6
(Spain) A Martín (Czech Republic) T Zíb	0	3
WC	(United States) B Baker (United States) R Ram	1	6	3
WC	(United States) S Jenkins (United States) B Reynolds	6	3	6
(Germany) T Haas (Germany) A Waske	6^{6}	3
WC	(United States) A Kuznetsov (United States) S Oudsema	7^{8}	6
(Spain) F López (Spain) F Verdasco	7^{7}	3	7^{7}
14	(Argentina) G Etlis (Argentina) M Rodríguez	6^{4}	6	6^{3}
12	(Czech Republic) C Suk (Czech Republic) P Vízner	6	6
(Spain) Á Calatrava (Spain) D Ferrer	3	1
(Switzerland) Y Allegro (Italy) D Bracciali	6	6
(Morocco) Y El Aynaoui (Belgium) T Vanhoudt	3	3
(Romania) A Pavel (Germany) R Schüttler	6^{2}	2
(Czech Republic) J Hernych (United States) V Spadea	7^{7}	6
(Austria) J Knowle (Austria) J Melzer	3	7^{7}	6
6	(France) M Llodra (France) F Santoro	6	6^{0}	4

Second round
1	(Sweden) J Björkman (Belarus) M Mirnyi	6^{3}	6	6
WC	(United States) S Jenkins (United States) B Reynolds	7^{7}	2	1
WC	(United States) A Kuznetsov (United States) S Oudsema	7^{7}	4	4
(Spain) F López (Spain) F Verdasco	6^{1}	6	6
12	(Czech Republic) C Suk (Czech Republic) P Vízner	6	2	6
(Switzerland) Y Allegro (Italy) D Bracciali	3	6	3
(Czech Republic) J Hernych (United States) V Spadea	7^{7}	4	7
(Austria) J Knowle (Austria) J Melzer	6^{2}	6	5

Third round
1	(Sweden) J Björkman (Belarus) M Mirnyi	6	6
(Spain) F López (Spain) F Verdasco	3	4
12	(Czech Republic) C Suk (Czech Republic) P Vízner	7^{9}	6
(Czech Republic) J Hernych (United States) V Spadea	6^{7}	4

Quarterfinals
1	(Sweden) J Björkman (Belarus) M Mirnyi	6	6
12	(Czech Republic) C Suk (Czech Republic) P Vízner	4	3

==== Section 2 ====
First round
4	(Zimbabwe) W Black (Zimbabwe) K Ullyett	6	7
(Italy) G Galimberti (Thailand) P Srichaphan	3	5
(Italy) M Bertolini (Italy) F Volandri	6	6
WC	(United States) S Querrey (United States) D Young	2	4
(Argentina) JI Chela (Argentina) M Zabaleta	3	4
(Sweden) T Johansson (South Africa) R Koenig	6	6
(United States) J Palmer (United States) T Parrott	7	6
16	(Argentina) L Arnold (Czech Republic) P Pála	5	4
11	(Israel) J Erlich (Israel) A Ram	3
(Czech Republic) T Cibulec (Czech Republic) J Novák	2^{r}
(Romania) V Hănescu (Romania) R Sabău	2	7	6
(United States) J Gimelstob (Argentina) M Hood	6	5	4
(Australia) J Kerr (United States) G Oliver	6	6
(Czech Republic) T Berdych (Germany) F Mayer	4	4
WC	(United States) A Delic (United States) J Morrison	7^{8}	7^{7}
5	(India) L Paes (Serbia and Montenegro) N Zimonjić	6^{6}	6^{2}

Second round
4	(Zimbabwe) W Black (Zimbabwe) K Ullyett	6	6
(Italy) M Bertolini (Italy) F Volandri	2	0
(Sweden) T Johansson (South Africa) R Koenig	6	6
(United States) J Palmer (United States) T Parrott	3	2
11	(Israel) J Erlich (Israel) A Ram	6	6
(Romania) V Hănescu (Romania) R Sabău	0	2
(Australia) J Kerr (United States) G Oliver	5	5
WC	(United States) A Delic (United States) J Morrison	7	7

Third round
4	(Zimbabwe) W Black (Zimbabwe) K Ullyett	4	6	6
(Sweden) T Johansson (South Africa) R Koenig	6	0	1
11	(Israel) J Erlich (Israel) A Ram	7^{7}	6
WC	(United States) A Delic (United States) J Morrison	6^{3}	3

Quarterfinals
4	(Zimbabwe) W Black (Zimbabwe) K Ullyett	6	6
11	(Israel) J Erlich (Israel) A Ram	4	2

=== Bottom half ===
==== Section 3 ====
First round
7	(India) M Bhupathi (Czech Republic) M Damm	6	6
(France) G Monfils (France) C Saulnier	1	3
(Croatia) M Ančić (Croatia) I Ljubičić	6	7^{7}
(Czech Republic) D Škoch (Czech Republic) R Štěpánek	2	6^{0}
(Belgium) C Rochus (Switzerland) S Wawrinka	5	1
(Russia) I Andreev (Russia) N Davydenko	7	6
(Australia) A Fisher (United States) R Leach	7	2	6^{3}
9	(Sweden) S Aspelin (Australia) T Perry	5	6	7^{7}
13	(Australia) S Huss (South Africa) W Moodie	6^{7}	1
(Germany) L Burgsmüller (Russia) M Youzhny	7^{9}	6
WC	(United States) A Bogomolov Jr. (United States) T Rettenmaier	2	3
(Slovakia) K Beck (Czech Republic) J Levinský	6	6
WC	(United States) N Kryvonos (United States) D Zivkovic	4	4
(Argentina) J Acasuso (Argentina) S Prieto	6	6
(United States) P Goldstein (United States) J Thomas	4	6	6
3	(The Bahamas) M Knowles (Canada) D Nestor	6	4	2

Second round
7	(India) M Bhupathi (Czech Republic) M Damm	7^{7}	3	7^{8}
(Croatia) M Ančić (Croatia) I Ljubičić	6^{3}	6	6^{6}
(Russia) I Andreev (Russia) N Davydenko	1	1
9	(Sweden) S Aspelin (Australia) T Perry	6	6
(Germany) L Burgsmüller (Russia) M Youzhny	6	6
(Slovakia) K Beck (Czech Republic) J Levinský	4	2
(Argentina) J Acasuso (Argentina) S Prieto	0	3
(United States) P Goldstein (United States) J Thomas	6	6

Third round
7	(India) M Bhupathi (Czech Republic) M Damm	4	7^{7}	3
9	(Sweden) S Aspelin (Australia) T Perry	6	6^{3}	6
(Germany) L Burgsmüller (Russia) M Youzhny	6^{8}	2
(United States) P Goldstein (United States) J Thomas	7^{10}	6

Quarterfinals
9	(Sweden) S Aspelin (Australia) T Perry	6	4	6^{14}
(United States) P Goldstein (United States) J Thomas	4	6	7^{16}

==== Section 4 ====
First round
8	(Australia) W Arthurs (Australia) P Hanley	7	6
(Finland) J Nieminen (Netherlands) R Wassen	5	3
(Slovakia) D Hrbatý (Slovakia) M Mertiňák	4	6	6
(Poland) M Fyrstenberg (Poland) M Matkowski	6	3	4
(France) J Benneteau (France) N Mahut	6	6
(Argentina) M García (Peru) L Horna	4	4
(United States) R Ginepri (Luxembourg) G Müller	4	3
10	(Czech Republic) F Čermák (Czech Republic) L Friedl	6	6
15	(Chile) F González (Chile) N Massú	6	7^{7}
(Germany) P Kohlschreiber (Belgium) O Rochus	4	6^{0}
(Denmark) K Carlsen (South Africa) J Coetzee	6	6
(Italy) E Artoni (Argentina) ~~M Puerta~~	2	3
(Italy) D Sanguinetti (Italy) A Seppi	3	1
(Sweden) R Lindstedt (Sweden) R Söderling	6	6
(France) A Clément (France) S Grosjean	6^{5}	6	3
2	(United States) B Bryan (United States) M Bryan	7^{7}	1	6

Second round
8	(Australia) W Arthurs (Australia) P Hanley	6	6
(Slovakia) D Hrbatý (Slovakia) M Mertiňák	3	2
(France) J Benneteau (France) N Mahut	7	7^{8}
10	(Czech Republic) F Čermák (Czech Republic) L Friedl	5	6^{6}
15	(Chile) F González (Chile) N Massú	6	6
(Denmark) K Carlsen (South Africa) J Coetzee	4	4
(Sweden) R Lindstedt (Sweden) R Söderling	6	2	3
2	(United States) B Bryan (United States) M Bryan	4	6	6

Third round
8	(Australia) W Arthurs (Australia) P Hanley	4	6^{6}
(France) J Benneteau (France) N Mahut	6	7^{8}
15	(Chile) F González (Chile) N Massú	3	1
2	(United States) B Bryan (United States) M Bryan	6	6

Quarterfinals
(France) J Benneteau (France) N Mahut	3	4
2	(United States) B Bryan (United States) M Bryan	6	6
