= 2005 US Open – Mixed doubles =

Mixed doubles
- 2005 US Open

Final
- Champion: (Slovakia) Daniela Hantuchová (India) Mahesh Bhupathi
- Runner-up: (Slovenia) Katarina Srebotnik (Serbia and Montenegro) Nenad Zimonjić
- Score: 6–4, 6–2

Details
- Draw: 32
- Seeds: 8

Events
Singles	men	women		boys	girls
Doubles	men	women	mixed	boys	girls
WC Singles	men	women	quad
WC Doubles	men	women	quad
Legends	men	women	mixed
- US Open

Vera Zvonareva and Bob Bryan were the defending champions, but Zvonareva did not participate in this U.S. Open due to injury. Bryan partnered Rennae Stubbs, and the pair lost in the quarterfinals to Corina Morariu and Mike Bryan.

Daniela Hantuchová and Mahesh Bhupathi won the title, defeating Katarina Srebotnik and Nenad Zimonjić in the final 6–4, 6–2. With this win, Hantuchová completed the Career Grand Slam in Mixed Doubles, becoming the thirteenth player to complete this milestone.

== Seeds ==
1. (Zimbabwe) Cara Black / (Zimbabwe) Wayne Black (second round)
2. (Australia) Rennae Stubbs / (United States) Bob Bryan (quarterfinals)
3. (Russia) Elena Likhovtseva / (Canada) Daniel Nestor (second round)
4. (United States) Lisa Raymond / (Sweden) Jonas Björkman (second round)
5. (Japan) Ai Sugiyama / (Zimbabwe) Kevin Ullyett (quarterfinals)
6. (United States) Corina Morariu / (United States) Mike Bryan (semifinals)
7. (United States) Martina Navratilova / (India) Leander Paes (quarterfinals)
8. (Australia) Alicia Molik / (Australia) Todd Perry (second round)

== Draw ==
Key

- Q = Qualifier
- WC = Wild card
- LL = Lucky loser
- Alt = Alternate
- ITF = ITF entry
- PR = Protected ranking
- SR = Special ranking
- SE = Special exempt
- JE = Junior exempt
- JR = Junior Accelerator Programme entrant
- CO = College Accelerator Programme entrant
- NG = Next Gen Accelerator Program entrant
- w/o = Walkover
- r = Retired
- d = Defaulted

=== Finals ===
Quarterfinals
(Russia) Dinara Safina (Israel) Andy Ram	6	6
(Australia) Samantha Stosur (Australia) Paul Hanley	3	4
(Slovenia) Katarina Srebotnik (Serbia and Montenegro) Nenad Zimonjić	7	5	[11]
7	(United States) Martina Navratilova (India) Leander Paes	6^{2}	7	[9]
5	(Japan) Ai Sugiyama (Zimbabwe) Kevin Ullyett	2	5
(Slovakia) Daniela Hantuchová (India) Mahesh Bhupathi	6	7
6	(United States) Corina Morariu (United States) Mike Bryan	6	6
2	(Australia) Rennae Stubbs (United States) Bob Bryan	4	4

Semifinals
(Russia) Dinara Safina (Israel) Andy Ram	1	5
(Slovenia) Katarina Srebotnik (Serbia and Montenegro) Nenad Zimonjić	6	7
(Slovakia) Daniela Hantuchová (India) Mahesh Bhupathi	7	7
6	(United States) Corina Morariu (United States) Mike Bryan	6^{4}	5

Final
(Slovenia) Katarina Srebotnik (Serbia and Montenegro) Nenad Zimonjić	4	2
(Slovakia) Daniela Hantuchová (India) Mahesh Bhupathi	6	6

=== Section 1 ===
First round
1	(Zimbabwe) C Black (Zimbabwe) W Black	6^{7}	6	[10]
WC	(United States) A Frazier (United States) T Parrott	7	3	[8]
(Russia) D Safina (Israel) A Ram	6	6
(Slovakia) J Husárová (Czech Republic) L Friedl	1	4
(Australia) S Stosur (Australia) P Hanley	7	6
(Russia) M Kirilenko (United States) G Oliver	5	4
(Serbia and Montenegro) J Janković (Czech Republic) P Vízner	6^{5}	6	[6]
8	(Australia) A Molik (Australia) T Perry	7	2	[10]
3	(Russia) E Likhovtseva (Canada) D Nestor	6	6
WC	(United States) M Shaughnessy (United States) J Gimelstob	4	2
(Slovenia) K Srebotnik (Serbia and Montenegro) N Zimonjić	6	6
(Australia) B Stewart (Israel) J Erlich	4	2
(Spain) V Ruano Pascuall (Australia) S Huss	7	7
WC	(United States) L Osterloh (United States) K Kim	6^{1}	6^{8}
(France) T Golovin (France) F Santoro	3	2
7	(United States) M Navratilova (India) L Paes	6	6

Second round
(Zimbabwe) C Black (Zimbabwe) W Black	3	4
(Russia) D Safina (Israel) A Ram	6	6
(Australia) S Stosur (Australia) P Hanley	7	6
8	(Australia) A Molik (Australia) T Perry	6^{1}	4
3	(Russia) E Likhovtseva (Canada) D Nestor	6^{3}	3
(Slovenia) K Srebotnik (Serbia and Montenegro) N Zimonjić	7	6
(Spain) V Ruano Pascuall (Australia) S Huss	1	4
7	(United States) M Navratilova (India) L Paes	6	6

Quarterfinals
(Russia) D Safina (Israel) A Ram	6	6
(Australia) S Stosur (Australia) P Hanley	3	4
(Slovenia) K Srebotnik (Serbia and Montenegro) N Zimonjić	7	5	[11]
7	(United States) M Navratilova (India) L Paes	6^{2}	7	[9]

Semifinals
(Russia) D Safina (Israel) A Ram	1	5
(Slovenia) K Srebotnik (Serbia and Montenegro) N Zimonjić	6	7

=== Section 2 ===
First round
5	(Japan) A Sugiyama (Zimbabwe) K Ullyett	6	6
(Argentina) ME "Ma.E" Salerni (Argentina) M Rodríguez	2	3
(Spain) A Medina Garrigues (Argentina) G Etlis	6	6
WC	(United States) L Granville (United States) R Leach	4	3
(China) Sun TT (Sweden) S Aspelin	6	3	[9]
(Slovakia) D Hantuchová (India) M Bhupathi	4	6	[11]
WC	(United States) S Perry (United States) A Delić	1	5
4	(United States) L Raymond (Sweden) J Björkman	6	7
6	(United States) C Morariu (United States) M Bryan
WC	(United States) J Craybas (United States) J Morrison
(Czech Republic) F Čermák (Germany) AL Grönefeld	6^{5}	6	[10]
(Czech Republic) K Peschke (Czech Republic) M Damm	7	4	[7]
(Australia) N Pratt (Czech Republic) C Suk	1	6	[9]
(Czech Republic) N Vaidišová (The Bahamas) M Knowles	6	1	[11]
(Italy) T Garbin (Argentina) M Hood	2	1
2	(Australia) R Stubbs (United States) B Bryan	6	6

Second round
5	(Japan) A Sugiyama (Zimbabwe) K Ullyett	6	6
(Spain) A Medina Garrigues (Argentina) G Etlis	3	4
(Slovakia) D Hantuchová (India) M Bhupathi	6	7
4	(United States) L Raymond (Sweden) J Björkman	3	6^{2}
6	(United States) C Morariu (United States) M Bryan	2	6	[10]
(Czech Republic) F Čermák (Germany) AL Grönefeld	6	2	[7]
(Czech Republic) N Vaidišová (The Bahamas) M Knowles	3	6^{4}
2	(Australia) R Stubbs (United States) B Bryan	6	7

Quarterfinals
5	(Japan) A Sugiyama (Zimbabwe) K Ullyett	5	2
(Slovakia) D Hantuchová (India) M Bhupathi	7	6
6	(United States) C Morariu (United States) M Bryan	6	6
2	(Australia) R Stubbs (United States) B Bryan	4	4

Semifinals
(Slovakia) D Hantuchová (India) M Bhupathi	7	7
6	(United States) C Morariu (United States) M Bryan	6^{4}	5
