= Alex Clayton =

American tennis player

- Country (sports): United States
- Born: 23 November 1987 (age 37) Plantation, United States
- Height: 1.83 m (6 ft 0 in)
- Plays: Right-handed
- College: Stanford
- Prize money: $24,673

Singles
- Career record: 0–1 (at ATP Tour level, Grand Slam level, and in Davis Cup)
- Career titles: 0
- Highest ranking: No. 796 (10 July 2006)

Doubles
- Career record: 0–2 (at ATP Tour level, Grand Slam level, and in Davis Cup)
- Career titles: 1 ITF
- Highest ranking: No. 759 (27 November 2006)

Grand Slam doubles results
- US Open Junior: W (2005)
- Last updated on: 15 March 2021.

Alex Clayton (born 23 November 1987) is an American tennis player.

Clayton achieved a career high ATP singles ranking of 796 on 10 July 2006. He also has a career high ATP doubles ranking of 759, achieved on 27 November 2006.

Clayton won the 2005 US Open – Boys' doubles title with Donald Young.

Clayton played college tennis at Stanford University.

== Junior Grand Slam titles ==
=== Doubles: 1 (1 title) ===
Result	Year	Tournament	Surface	Partner	Opponents	Score
Winner	2005	(United States) US Open	Hard	(United States) Donald Young	(Australia) Carsten Ball (Netherlands) Thiemo de Bakker	7–6^{(7–3)}, 4–6, 7–5
