= Piero Luisi =

Venezuelan tennis player (born 1987)

- Full name: Piero Antonio Luisi
- Country (sports): Venezuela
- Born: March 13, 1987 (age 38); Valencia, Venezuela
- Plays: Right-handed
- Prize money: $39,891

Singles
- Career record: 7–5 (Davis Cup)
- Highest ranking: No. 471 (10 July 2006)

Doubles
- Career record: 5–3 (Davis Cup)
- Highest ranking: No. 393 (7 November 2011)
Medal record
Central American and Caribbean Games
Gold medal – first place	2010 Mayagüez	Men's Doubles

Piero Antonio Luisi (born 13 March 1987) is a Venezuelan former professional tennis player.

== Biography ==
The son of an Italian-born father, Luisi was raised in Valencia, Carabobo. A notable performer in junior tennis, he was the 2004 Orange Bowl doubles champion and was ranked as high as 12th in the ITF world rankings for singles. In 2005 he reached the third round of the boys' singles at both Wimbledon and the US Open.

While competing on the professional tour he reached a career best singles ranking of 471. During his career he appeared in a total of 12 Davis Cup ties for Venezuela, debuting in 2006. He won his only ITF Futures singles tournament in 2009 and featured in the qualifying draw for the 2010 U.S. Men's Clay Court Championships. In doubles he won 22 Futures events and had a career best ranking of 393 in the world.

Luisi was a doubles gold medalist for Venezuela at the 2010 Central American and Caribbean Games and also represented his country at the 2011 Pan American Games.
