= Amina Rakhim =

Kazakhstani tennis player

- Country (sports): Kazakhstan
- Born: 22 February 1989 (age 36) Almaty
- Turned pro: 2004
- Plays: Right (two-handed backhand)
- Prize money: $23,555

Singles
- Career record: 48–31
- Career titles: 1 ITF
- Highest ranking: No. 259 (10 September 2007)

Doubles
- Career record: 33–17
- Career titles: 4 ITF
- Highest ranking: No. 215 (25 February 2008)

Amina Rakhim (Russian: Амина Рахим; born 22 February 1989) is a Kazakhstani former professional tennis player.

She took part in the 2007 Bangalore Open but lost in the final qualifying round to Sun Shengnan. On 10 September 2007, she reached her career-high singles ranking of world No. 259. On 25 February 2008, she peaked at No. 215 in the doubles rankings.

In 2007, she won the biggest title of her career, winning a $50k doubles tournament. Her last professional match took place in Jersey, Great Britain in November 2008.

== ITF finals ==
$100,000 tournaments
$75,000 tournaments
$50,000 tournaments
$25,000 tournaments
$10,000 tournaments

=== Singles (1–3) ===
Result	No.	Date	Tournament	Surface	Opponent	Score
Loss	1.	21 May 2006	Pitești, Romania	Clay	(Serbia) Vojislava Lukić	6–7^{(3–7)}, 7–5, 4–6
Loss	2.	23 September 2006	Tbilisi, Georgia	Hard	(Russia) Anna Lapushchenkova	6–7^{(0–7)}, 2–6
Loss	3.	11 November 2006	Pune, India	Hard	(Thailand) Nungnadda Wannasuk	6–3, 3–6, 2–6
Win	1.	19 November 2006	Pune, India	Clay	(Uzbekistan) Akgul Amanmuradova	7–6^{(7–5)}, 4–2 ret.

=== Doubles (4–0) ===
Result	No.	Date	Tournament	Surface	Partner	Opponents	Score
Win	1.	20 May 2006	Pitești, Romania	Clay	(Romania) Raluca Ciulei	(Romania) Maria-Luiza Crăciun (Romania) Ioana Ivan	3–6, 6–1, 6–3
Win	2.	21 July 2006	Bucharest, Romania	Clay	(Romania) Raluca Ciulei	(Romania) Maria-Luiza Crăciun (Romania) Ágnes Szatmári	6–3, 6–1
Win	3.	17 September 2006	Tbilisi, Georgia	Hard	(Russia) Yulia Solonitskaya	(Russia) Varvara Galanina (Armenia) Liudmila Nikoyan	7–5, 6–1
Win	4.	22 July 2007	Dnipropetrovsk, Ukraine	Clay	(Australia) Arina Rodionova	(Croatia) Ivana Abramović (Croatia) Maria Abramović	7–5, 4–6, 6–2
