= Renée Reinhard =

Dutch professional tennis player

- Country (sports): Netherlands
- Born: 16 March 1990 (age 35); Naarden, Netherlands
- Prize money: $12,622

Singles
- Career record: 44–22
- Career titles: 2 ITF
- Highest ranking: No. 489 (7 July 2008)

Doubles
- Career record: 32–12
- Career titles: 5 ITF
- Highest ranking: No. 489 (7 July 2008)

Renée Reinhard (born 16 March 1990) is a former professional tennis player from the Netherlands.

== Biography ==
Reinhard comes from North Holland, born in Naarden and growing up in Alkmaar, where her mother worked as a tennis teacher. One of six children, she is the youngest of her three sisters, who also played tennis.

She starting playing tennis herself at the age of five, with a highlight of her junior career coming in 2004 when she won the European 14 & Under title.

Debuting on the ITF Circuit in 2006, Reinhard went on to win seven titles, two in singles and five in doubles.

In 2008, she featured in four ties for the Netherlands Fed Cup team. She registered Fed Cup singles wins over Claudine Schaul, Ana Catarina Nogueira and Dia Evtimova. Her only loss came against world No. 2, Ana Ivanovic, but she managed to take the Serbian player to three sets.

== ITF finals ==
=== Singles (2–2) ===
Result	No.	Date	Location	Surface	Opponent	Score
Win	1.	16 July 2006	Brussels, Belgium	Clay	(Netherlands) Marlot Meddens	2–6, 6–4, 7–6^{(4)}
Loss	1.	9 September 2007	Alphen a/d Rijn, Netherlands	Clay	(Netherlands) Arantxa Rus	6–4, 5–7, 6–7^{(2)}
Win	2.	14 January 2008	Stuttgart, Germany	Hard (i)	(Switzerland) Nicole Riner	2–6, 6–4, 6–4
Loss	2.	27 January 2008	Kaarst, Germany	Carpet (i)	(Portugal) Neuza Silva	3–6, 1–6

=== Doubles (5–3) ===
Result	No.	Date	Location	Surface	Partner	Opponents	Score
Win	1.	2 July 2006	Heerhugowaard, Netherlands	Clay	(Netherlands) Karen Nijssen	(Netherlands) Daniëlle Harmsen (Netherlands) Alexandra Poorta	7–5, 6–3
Loss	1.	3 December 2006	Tel Aviv, Israel	Hard	(Netherlands) Marrit Boonstra	(Austria) Eva-Maria Hoch (Montenegro) Ana Veselinović	4–6, 6–7
Win	2.	26 August 2007	Vlaardingen, Netherlands	Clay	(Netherlands) Daniëlle Harmsen	(Netherlands) Talitha de Groot (Russia) Anna Savitskaya	3–6, 6–4, 6–2
Win	3.	10 September 2007	Alphen a/d Rijn, Netherlands	Clay	(Netherlands) Daniëlle Harmsen	(South Africa) Kelly Anderson (United States) Kady Pooler	6–2, 6–4
Loss	2.	5 November 2007	Redbridge, UK	Hard	(Netherlands) Daniëlle Harmsen	(United Kingdom) Naomi Broady (Poland) Patrycja Sanduska	6–0, 1–6, [5–10]
Loss	3.	11 November 2007	Sunderland, UK	Hard	(Netherlands) Daniëlle Harmsen	(United Kingdom) Katharina Brown (United Kingdom) Elizabeth Thomas	3–6, 1–6
Win	4.	22 June 2008	Alkmaar, Netherlands	Clay	(Netherlands) Daniëlle Harmsen	(Serbia) Neda Kozić (Russia) Anastasia Poltoratskaya	6–2, 7–6^{(10)}
Win	5.	29 June 2008	Breda, Netherlands	Clay	(Netherlands) Daniëlle Harmsen	(Belarus) Ima Bohush (Ukraine) Lesia Tsurenko	w/o

== See also ==
- List of Netherlands Fed Cup team representatives
