= Jessica Lehnhoff =

Guatemalan-born, Swedish/American tennis player

- Full name: Jessica Lehnhoff
- Born: March 15, 1980 (age 45) Guatemala City, Guatemala
- Plays: Right-handed

Singles
- Career record: 78–55
- Career titles: 2 ITF
- Highest ranking: No. 166 (June 14, 2004)

Doubles
- Career record: 89–46
- Career titles: 10 ITF
- Highest ranking: No. 105 (July 12, 2004)

Grand Slam doubles results
- French Open: 1R (2004)
- Wimbledon: 2R (2004)
- US Open: 3R (2001)

Jessica Lehnhoff (born 15 March 1980) is a former University of Florida tennis player. Was ranked #1 in the nation in D1 singles & doubles. NCAA doubles Champion, NCAA singles finalist, 7x All-American, All-American champion in singles & doubles.Played on the WTA tour after her college career, reaching WTA rankings of 166 singles and 105 doubles. Round of 16 US OPEN doubles, losing to Martina Navratilova and Arantxa Sanchez-Vicario. Inducted into the University of Florida Hall of Fame in 2016.

== Biography ==
Lehnhoff grew up in Guatemala City, the youngest in a family of four siblings, who moved to Florida when she was aged 11. She holds citizenship in 3 countries (Sweden, Guatemala & USA). Growing up in Guatemala, she attended the "Colegio Austriaco" (Austrian school), where she and her brothers all learned how to speak German. One of her brothers, Alexander, played Davis Cup for Guatemala. Their mother, Anne-Marie is Swedish and their father Guatemalan/German. Their father Walter died in 1999, while Lehnhoff was a freshman at the University of Florida .

A right-handed player, she was highly rated as a junior. Lehnhoff was the top ranked player in the country (USA) for her age group in 1995, the year she won a doubles title at the Orange Bowl. Lehnhoff also won the singles titles at the Eddie Herr International tournament as well as the Orange Bowl under 14's, making her the top 14 and under junior player in the world. She ended her junior tennis career having been ranked No. 1 in the US in the 14's, 16's and 18's divisions having won numerous national titles including hard court nationals, clay court nationals and indoor nationals. She was also ranked top 10 in the world under 18's division, having won Grade A and Grade 1 tournaments. After graduating from Cooper City High School and later on, American Heritage in Delray Beach, she played collegiate tennis for the University of Florida Gators. Partnering Whitney Laiho, she won the doubles title at the 2001 NCAA Division I Women's Tennis Championships after being undefeated all year. The pair subsequently were given a wildcard into the women's doubles at the US Open and reached the third round. That year, she and Laiho received the National doubles team of the year award. She captained the Gators in her senior year (having been ranked No. 1 in the nation in both singles and doubles in division 1 tennis) and graduated in 2002 with a degree in TV and Film production, after which she turned professional. During her senior year at UF, Lehnhoff won the All-American titles in both singles and doubles for only the third time in collegiate history. She was an NCAA singles finalist that year.

As a professional, Lehnhoff reached a singles ranking of 166 in the world and won two ITF singles titles after only two years on tour. In 2004, she featured in the main draw of the French Open, Wimbledon Championships and US Open. At Wimbledon she partnered with Bethanie Mattek to reach the second round and as a result, made it to her best doubles ranking of 105. She was a quarterfinalist in doubles at the 2004 Challenge Bell, a WTA Tour tournament held in Quebec City, and won ten doubles titles on the pro circuit.

By 2007 she was retired from the tour (after undergoing two right wrist surgeries) but began playing Fed Cup tennis for her native Guatemala. Over two years she appeared in a total of eight ties and finished with an 8–5 overall record.

Lehnhoff owns and runs Lehnhoff Tennis International, a college placement company, assisting junior tennis players from Scandinavia to be recruited by American colleges. She has also coached top Swedish junior players as well as ATP and WTA players. She was inducted into the UF athletic hall of fame in 2016, alongside basketball player David Lee and olympian swimmer Ryan Lochte.

== ITF finals ==
Legend
$50,000 tournaments
$25,000 tournaments
$10,000 tournaments

=== Singles (2–0) ===
Result	No.	Date	Location	Surface	Opponent	Score
Win	1.	23 June 2002	Dallas, United States	Hard	(Indonesia) Wukirasih Sawondari	6–2, 6–1
Win	2.	23 November 2003	Nuriootpa, Australia	Hard	(Japan) Aiko Nakamura	7–6^{(2)}, 7–6^{(2)}

=== Doubles (10–5) ===
Result	No.	Date	Location	Surface	Partner	Opponents	Score
Win	1.	8 January 2002	Tallahassee, United States	Hard	(Canada) Vanessa Webb	(Croatia) Ivana Abramović (United States) Jacqueline Trail	6–4, 6–3
Win	2.	16 June 2002	Allentown, United States	Hard	(United States) Jennifer Russell	(United States) Tanner Cochran (United States) Kristen Schlukebir	6–4, 6–7^{(4)}, 7–6^{(4)}
Win	3.	23 June 2002	Dallas, United States	Hard	(United States) Julie Rotondi	(Indonesia) Liza Andriyani (Indonesia) Wukirasih Sawondari	6–1, 6–1
Win	4.	21 July 2002	Oyster Bay, United States	Hard	(United States) Jennifer Russell	(Kazakhstan) Irina Selyutina (Japan) Nana Smith	4–6, 6–4, 6–3
Win	5.	5 May 2003	Sea Island, United States	Clay	(United States) Jennifer Russell	(Australia) Lisa McShea (Australia) Christina Wheeler	6–3, 6–4
Win	6.	14 July 2003	Oyster Bay, United States	Hard	(United States) Jennifer Russell	(United States) Ansley Cargill (Republic of Ireland) Kelly Liggan	6–2, 6–3
Win	7.	22 July 2003	Lexington, United States	Hard	(Chinese Taipei) Janet Lee	(Australia) Bryanne Stewart (Australia) Christina Wheeler	6–3, 6–4
Win	8.	14 September 2003	Peachtree, United States	Hard	(United States) Lauren Kalvaria	(United States) Amanda Augustus (Canada) Mélanie Marois	4–6, 6–3, 6–1
Win	9.	24 November 2003	Mount Gambier, Australia	Hard	(Australia) Christina Wheeler	(Australia) Bryanne Stewart (Australia) Samantha Stosur	7–5, 6–2
Loss	1.	28 February 2004	St. Paul, United States	Hard (i)	(Australia) Trudi Musgrave	(New Zealand) Leanne Baker (Italy) Francesca Lubiani	7–6^{(3)}, 3–2 ret.
Loss	2.	4 April 2004	Augusta, United States	Hard	(United States) Julie Ditty	(Italy) Francesca Lubiani (United States) Mashona Washington	1–6, 3–6
Win	10.	16 May 2004	Charlottesville, United States	Clay	(Argentina) Erica Krauth	(Puerto Rico) Vilmarie Castellvi (United States) Sunitha Rao	6–0, 6–1
Loss	3.	17 August 2004	Bronx Open, United States	Hard	(Australia) Christina Wheeler	(China) Li Na (China) Liu Nannan	7–5, 3–6, 3–6
Loss	4.	18 February 2007	Montechoro, Portugal	Hard	(United States) Robin Stephenson	(Netherlands) Marrit Boonstra (Netherlands) Nicole Thyssen	3–6, 6–3, 2–6
Loss	5.	26 February 2007	Portimão, Portugal	Hard	(United States) Robin Stephenson	(Portugal) Neuza Silva (Netherlands) Nicole Thyssen	4–6, 2–6
