= Megan Bradley =

American tennis player

- Full name: Megan Christine Bradley-Rose
- Country (sports): United States
- Born: March 26, 1983 (age 41); Columbia, Missouri
- Prize money: $41,731

Singles
- Career record: 35–31
- Highest ranking: No. 313 (May 22, 2006)

Doubles
- Career record: 13–19
- Highest ranking: No. 221 (July 17, 2006)

Grand Slam doubles results
- US Open: 2R (2001, 2005)

Grand Slam mixed doubles results
- US Open: 1R (2001)

Megan Christine Bradley-Rose (born March 26, 1983) is a former American professional tennis player. She played collegiate tennis at the University of Miami in Coral Gables, Florida.

== Biography ==
Bradley was born in Columbia, Missouri in 1983. Her father Phil had been a college football player at the local University of Missouri, the first African-American quarter-back to represent the team. He later played Major League Baseball, including five seasons with the Seattle Mariners.

As a junior tennis player she had the distinction of finishing 1999 as the top ranked 16s player in the country and represented the United States that year at the World Youth Cup.

After attending Ransom Everglades School in Miami, Bradley started her collegiate tennis career at UCLA, playing one season as a freshman in 2001-02 and reaching an NCAA doubles final. Returning to Florida, she then played three seasons at the University of Miami. While at Miami she was an NCAA singles semi-finalist in 2003–04.

Bradley featured in the main draw of two editions of the US Open. At the 2001 US Open, she and partner Erin Burdette had a win over veteran Dutch pair Kristie Boogert and Miriam Oremans. She also competed in the mixed doubles draw with Justin Gimelstob. Four years later she returned to the main draw in the women's doubles partnering Kristi Miller and again made it to the second round.

She won her only professional ITF title in 2005, at an event in South Lake, Texas, beating Story Tweedie-Yates in the final.

Later completing a master's degree at the University of South Florida, Bradley worked in sports media for several years and was briefly an assistant coach at the University of Miami. From 2009 to 2012 she served as the head coach for Princeton.
