= Jonathan Stokke =

American tennis player

- Country (sports): United States
- Residence: Charleston, SC
- Born: 11 April 1984 (age 41) Long Beach, United States
- Plays: Right-handed (two-handed backhand)
- Official website: instagram.com/stokketennis

Doubles
- Career record: 0–2 (at ATP Tour level, Grand Slam level, and in Davis Cup)
- Highest ranking: No. 1255 (17 September 2001)

Grand Slam doubles results
- US Open: 1R (2001, 2002)

Coaching awards and records
- Awards ITA Carolina Region Assistant Coach of the Year (2013) Records Duke University 183-91; Wake Forest 24-27
- Last updated on: November 5, 2021.

Jonathan Stokke (born 11 April 1984) is an American tennis coach and former All-American player at Duke University. Jonathan currently resides in Charleston, SC where he coaches highly ranked junior players.

== Playing career ==
=== College ===
Stokke graduated from Duke in May, 2006, with a degree in sociology and a certificate in markets and management. In 2006, he earned All-America honors in doubles with teammate Joey Atas. He was a two-time All-ACC selection in 2003 and 2004 and was named the ACC Championship MVP in 2006. He is also the first player in program history to win the ITA National Arthur Ashe Sportsmanship & Leadership Award, claiming the honor in 2006. He also earned the USTA Sportsmanship Award that season. Stokke also picked up numerous academic honors, including a selection to the first ever All-ACC Academic Team and three seasons on the ACC Honor Roll.

In his career at Duke, Stokke played in four straight NCAA Championship tournaments and advanced to the NCAA Round of 16 three times. In 2006 he was a captain on Duke’s ACC championship team. For his career, Stokke had a 93-59 overall singles record and a 113-47 doubles mark. His 113 doubles victories rank him fifth on the all-time Duke list. He was 25-10 in singles and 28-9 in doubles in ACC matches. His 28 doubles wins place him third on the Duke career chart. He was ranked in the top 20 in the ITA in singles and top 10 in doubles during his playing career with the Blue Devils.

=== Professional ===
Stokke made his ATP main draw debut at the 2001 US Open in the doubles draw partnering Rajeev Ram. Stokke has a career high ATP doubles ranking of 1255 achieved on September 17, 2001.

== Coaching career ==
=== Current ===
Stokke currently works with highly ranked juniors in South Carolina.

=== Duke (2010-2020) ===
Stokke joined the Duke men's tennis staff in July, 2010, and served as the associate head coach. He served as an assistant coach for his first five campaigns on staff.

During his Duke tenure, he has been a part of five seasons with 20 or more wins, seven NCAA Team Championship appearances, four NCAA Round of 16 trips and one NCAA quarterfinal. Stokke has also been a part of five ITA Indoor Team Championship appearances and five times hosting an ITA Kick-Off Weekend.

A noted doubles coaching specialist, Stokke’s groups excelled in 2018. He helped Duke capture the doubles point 18 times as the Blue Devils went 14-4 (.778 winning percentage) in those 18 contests.

=== Wake Forest (2008-2010) ===
Stokke worked as an assistant women’s tennis coach at Wake Forest University for two years. Stokke directed the Demon Deacons to a 24-27 overall record and an NCAA Championship tournament selection in 2009. He saw two players earn spots on the 2010 All-ACC team, including Martina Pavelec, who also received the ITA Carolina Region Player to Watch award.

== Coaching Style ==
Jonathan Stokke is known for his analytical approach to coaching.
