= Erin Burdette =

American tennis player

- Country (sports): United States
- Born: April 19, 1983 (age 42) Macon, Georgia, U.S.
- Height: 5 ft 11 in (1.80 m)
- Plays: Right-handed
- Prize money: $12,075

Singles
- Highest ranking: No. 543 (July 24, 2000)

Doubles
- Highest ranking: No. 293 (September 17, 2001)

Grand Slam doubles results
- US Open: 2R (2001)

Erin Burdette (born April 19, 1983) is an American former professional tennis player.

== Biography ==
Burdette, a right-handed player, was born and raised in the state of Georgia. As a junior, she was a girls' doubles runner-up at the 2000 Australian Open, partnering Lauren Barnikow. She won her first professional singles title at El Paso in 2000.

At the 2001 US Open she and Megan Bradley received a wildcard into the women's doubles main draw, reaching the second round. They also played together in the girls' doubles and won their way through to the semi-finals.

The eldest of three sisters to play college tennis for Stanford, Burdette was a four-time All-American and featured in three NCAA championships winning teams. She was the 2005 NCAA doubles champion with Alice Barnes in 2005, beating Stanford teammate Amber Liu and Anne Yelsey in the final. Both of her sisters, Lindsay and Mallory, both also later won NCAA doubles championships.

She now works as a veterinarian in San Francisco.
