= Whitney Laiho =

American tennis player

- Full name: Whitney Laiho-Biles
- Country (sports): United States
- Born: May 8, 1980 (age 46)
- Height: 5-9

Singles
- Career titles: 0 WTA / 1 ITF
- Highest ranking: No. 675 (October 4, 1999)

Doubles
- Highest ranking: No. 632 (July 26, 1999)

Grand Slam doubles results
- US Open: 3R (2001)

Whitney Laiho-Biles (born May 8, 1980) is an American former tennis player.

== Biography ==
A right-handed player from Rhode Island, Laiho attended Middletown High School and was a top 50 ranked ITF junior. She made the girls' singles quarter-finals of the 1997 US Open.

Her first professional title came at the Baltimore USTA satellite in 1999, which she secured by beating Vilmarie Castellvi in the final.

Laiho was a five-time All-American tennis player for the University of Florida and most notably partnered with Jessica Lehnhoff to win the 2001 NCAA Division I women's doubles championship.

As the reigning NCAA doubles champions, Laiho and Lehnhoff earned a wildcard into the women's doubles main draw of the 2001 US Open. They became the first college pairing since 1983 to make the third round, where they were beaten by Martina Navratilova and Arantxa Sánchez Vicario.
