= 2001 US Open – Women's singles =

Women's singles
- 2001 US Open

Final
- Champion: (United States) Venus Williams
- Runner-up: (United States) Serena Williams
- Score: 6–2, 6–4
- Date: September 8, 2001

Details
- Draw: 128
- Seeds: 32

Events
Singles	men	women		boys	girls
Doubles	men	women	mixed	boys	girls
WC Singles	men	women	quad
WC Doubles	men	women	quad
Legends	men	women	mixed
- US Open

Defending champion Venus Williams defeated her sister Serena Williams in the final, 6–2, 6–4 to win the women's singles tennis title at the 2001 US Open. It was her second US Open singles title and fourth major singles title overall. Venus did not lose a set during the tournament. The championship match was the first of nine major finals contested by the Williams sisters, and the first US Open women's singles final to take place during American television prime time.

== Seeds ==
1. (Switzerland) Martina Hingis (semifinals)
2. (United States) Jennifer Capriati (semifinals)
3. (United States) Lindsay Davenport (quarterfinals)
4. (United States) Venus Williams (champion)
5. (Belgium) Kim Clijsters (quarterfinals)
6. (Belgium) Justine Henin (fourth round)
7. (United States) Monica Seles (fourth round)
8. (France) Amélie Mauresmo (quarterfinals)
9. (France) Nathalie Tauziat (fourth round)
10. (United States) Serena Williams (final)
11. (Russia) Elena Dementieva (fourth round)
12. (United States) Meghann Shaughnessy (third round)
13. (South Africa) Amanda Coetzer (first round)
14. (Federal Republic of Yugoslavia) Jelena Dokić (fourth round)
15. (Bulgaria) Magdalena Maleeva (second round)
16. (Italy) Silvia Farina Elia (first round)
17. (Germany) Anke Huber (third round)
18. (France) Sandrine Testud (fourth round)
19. (Austria) Barbara Schett (fourth round)
20. (Spain) Arantxa Sánchez Vicario (third round)
21. (Russia) Elena Likhovtseva (fourth round)
22. (Uzbekistan) Iroda Tulyaganova (second round)
23. (Spain) Magüi Serna (first round)
24. (Argentina) Paola Suárez (first round)
25. (Slovakia) Henrieta Nagyová (third round)
26. (Thailand) Tamarine Tanasugarn (first round)
27. (Spain) Ángeles Montolio (third round)
28. (United States) Chanda Rubin (third round)
29. (United States) Amy Frazier (first round)
30. (United States) Lisa Raymond (third round)
31. (Spain) Cristina Torrens Valero (first round)
32. (Italy) Francesca Schiavone (first round)

== Draw ==
Key

- Q = Qualifier
- WC = Wild card
- LL = Lucky loser
- Alt = Alternate
- ITF = ITF entry
- PR = Protected ranking
- SR = Special ranking
- SE = Special exempt
- JE = Junior exempt
- JR = Junior Accelerator Programme entrant
- CO = College Accelerator Programme entrant
- NG = Next Gen Accelerator Program entrant
- w/o = Walkover
- r = Retired
- d = Defaulted

=== Finals ===
Quarterfinals
1	(Switzerland) Martina Hingis	6	6
(Czech Republic) Dája Bedáňová	2	0
3	(United States) Lindsay Davenport	3	7^{9}	5
10	(United States) Serena Williams	6	6^{7}	7
5	(Belgium) Kim Clijsters	3	1
4	(United States) Venus Williams	6	6
8	(France) Amélie Mauresmo	3	4
2	(United States) Jennifer Capriati	6	6

Semifinals
1	(Switzerland) Martina Hingis	3	2
10	(United States) Serena Williams	6	6
4	(United States) Venus Williams	6	6
2	(United States) Jennifer Capriati	4	2

Final
10	(United States) Serena Williams	2	4
4	(United States) Venus Williams	6	6

=== Top half ===
==== Section 1 ====
First round
1	(Switzerland) M Hingis	6	6
WC	(United States) L Granville	2	0
(Russia) L Krasnoroutskaya	7	6
(United States) J Craybas	5	3
(Russia) T Panova	1	1
(Croatia) I Majoli	6	6
(Germany) B Rittner	6	6
29	(United States) A Frazier	1	2
20	(Spain) A Sánchez Vicario	6	3	7^{7}
(Hungary) P Mandula	3	6	6^{5}
WC	(United States) A Cargill	6^{4}	3
(Japan) A Sugiyama	7^{7}	6
Q	(Switzerland) M-G Mikaelian	4	3
(United States) L Osterloh	6	6
(Italy) A Serra-Zanetti	2	6	3
14	(Federal Republic of Yugoslavia) J Dokić	6	3	6

Second round
1	(Switzerland) M Hingis	6	6
(Russia) L Krasnoroutskaya	0	2
(Croatia) I Majoli	6	7
(Germany) B Rittner	4	5
20	(Spain) A Sánchez Vicario	6	6
(Japan) A Sugiyama	3	2
(United States) L Osterloh	3	3
14	(Federal Republic of Yugoslavia) J Dokić	6	6

Third round
1	(Switzerland) M Hingis	4	6	7^{7}
(Croatia) I Majoli	6	4	6^{5}
20	(Spain) A Sánchez Vicario	4	5
14	(Federal Republic of Yugoslavia) J Dokić	6	7

Fourth round
1	(Switzerland) M Hingis	6	6
14	(Federal Republic of Yugoslavia) J Dokić	4	0

==== Section 2 ====
First round
12	(United States) M Shaughnessy	3	6	7^{7}
(Italy) R Grande	6	3	6^{2}
(Spain) N Llagostera	0	4
(Sweden) Å Carlsson	6	6
(Czech Republic) D Bedáňová	6	6
(South Africa) J Kruger	1	2
(Croatia) S Talaja	7	6
24	(Argentina) P Suárez	5	2
26	(Thailand) T Tanasugarn	3	5
(Australia) R McQuillan	6	7
WC	(United States) A Liu	3	3
Q	(Greece) E Daniilidou	6	6
(Germany) B Lamade	4	6^{5}
Q	(Russia) E Kulikovskaya	6	7^{7}
(Australia) N Pratt	1	2
7	(United States) M Seles	6	6

Second round
12	(United States) M Shaughnessy	7^{7}	6
(Sweden) Å Carlsson	6^{4}	3
(Czech Republic) D Bedáňová	6	6
(Croatia) S Talaja	1	3
(Australia) R McQuillan	1	5
Q	(Greece) E Daniilidou	6	7
Q	(Russia) E Kulikovskaya	1	4
7	(United States) M Seles	6	6

Third round
12	(United States) M Shaughnessy	4	1
(Czech Republic) D Bedáňová	6	6
Q	(Greece) E Daniilidou	2	3
7	(United States) M Seles	6	6

Fourth round
(Czech Republic) D Bedáňová	7	4	6
7	(United States) M Seles	5	6	3

==== Section 3 ====
First round
3	(United States) L Davenport	6	6
(Germany) A Glass	2	3
(France) É Loit	6	7
(Italy) ME Camerin	3	5
(Netherlands) M Oremans	6	4	6
(Hungary) Z Gubacsi	4	6	3
Q	(Italy) G Pizzichini	1	7^{7}	1
27	(Spain) Á Montolio	6	6^{2}	6
21	(Russia) E Likhovtseva	4	7^{7}	6
Q	(Ukraine) T Perebiynis	6	6^{4}	1
(Russia) N Petrova	6	6^{3}	6
Q	(France) A Fusai	4	7^{7}	2
(Japan) S Asagoe	4	7	4
(France) V Razzano	6	5	6
Q	(Austria) B Schwartz	1	6	6
13	(South Africa) A Coetzer	6	4	4

Second round
3	(United States) L Davenport	6	6
(France) É Loit	0	2
(Netherlands) M Oremans	2	1
27	(Spain) Á Montolio	6	6
21	(Russia) E Likhovtseva	6	2	6
(Russia) N Petrova	4	6	4
(France) V Razzano	1	6^{4}
Q	(Austria) B Schwartz	6	7^{7}

Third round
3	(United States) L Davenport	6	6
27	(Spain) Á Montolio	3	2
21	(Russia) E Likhovtseva	6^{6}	7	6
Q	(Austria) B Schwartz	7^{8}	5	4

Fourth round
3	(United States) L Davenport	6	0	6
21	(Russia) E Likhovtseva	3	6	3

==== Section 4 ====
First round
10	(United States) S Williams	4	6	6
(Germany) A Barna	6	1	2
(Czech Republic) D Chládková	6	6
LL	(Germany) M Müller	1	2
(Slovakia) M Suchá	7^{7}	6
Q	(Italy) R Vinci	6^{4}	1
(Spain) E Bes	6	6
23	(Spain) M Serna	3	1
31	(Spain) C Torrens Valero	6	1	1
(Switzerland) M Vavrinec	2	6	6
(Luxembourg) A Kremer	0	2
(Belarus) T Poutchek	6	6
(Switzerland) P Schnyder	6	6
(Paraguay) R de los Ríos	4	1
(United States) M Irvin	3	3
6	(Belgium) J Henin	6	6

Second round
10	(United States) S Williams	6	6
(Czech Republic) D Chládková	1	1
(Slovakia) M Suchá	6	6
(Spain) E Bes	2	3
(Switzerland) M Vavrinec	7	4	6
(Belarus) T Poutchek	5	6	2
(Switzerland) P Schnyder	7^{9}	1	4
6	(Belgium) J Henin	6^{7}	6	6

Third round
10	(United States) S Williams	6	6
(Slovakia) M Suchá	1	0
(Switzerland) M Vavrinec	3	2
6	(Belgium) J Henin	6	6

Fourth round
10	(United States) S Williams	7	6
6	(Belgium) J Henin	5	0

=== Bottom half ===
==== Section 5 ====
First round
5	(Belgium) K Clijsters	6	6
(New Zealand) P Nola	1	1
(Colombia) C Castaño	7^{7}	6^{5}	3
WC	(United States) A Bradshaw	6^{3}	7^{7}	6
(Slovakia) D Hantuchová	7	4	2
(France) N Dechy	5	6	6
(Argentina) M Díaz Oliva	0	4
25	(Slovakia) H Nagyová	6	6
17	(Germany) A Huber	6	6
(Argentina) ME Salerni	2	4
WC	(United States) S Taylor	6	6^{4}	6
(Germany) M Weingärtner	3	7^{7}	1
(Switzerland) E Gagliardi	7	4	6^{2}
(Slovakia) K Habšudová	5	6	7^{7}
Q	(South Korea) Y-j Cho	3	5
11	(Russia) E Dementieva	6	7

Second round
5	(Belgium) K Clijsters	6	6
WC	(United States) A Bradshaw	3	2
(France) N Dechy	2	1
25	(Slovakia) H Nagyová	6	6
17	(Germany) A Huber	7^{7}	6
WC	(United States) S Taylor	6^{2}	4
(Slovakia) K Habšudová	6^{5}	7	0
11	(Russia) E Dementieva	7^{7}	5	6

Third round
5	(Belgium) K Clijsters	6	7
25	(Slovakia) H Nagyová	3	5
17	(Germany) A Huber	3	5
11	(Russia) E Dementieva	6	7

Fourth round
5	(Belgium) K Clijsters	7	4	6
11	(Russia) E Dementieva	5	6	2

==== Section 6 ====
First round
16	(Italy) S Farina Elia	2	4
(Slovenia) M Matevžič	6	6
(Indonesia) W Prakusya	6	6
LL	(Germany) G Arn	1	0
(Hungary) R Kuti-Kis	4	7	1
(Spain) G León García	6	5	6
Q	(Germany) N Dübbers	3	2
18	(France) S Testud	6	6
30	(United States) L Raymond	6	6
(Israel) A Smashnova	2	3
(United States) S Cacic	5	4
(United States) J Hopkins	7	6
(United States) M Tu	6	2	6
WC	(United States) A Harkleroad	4	6	0
Q	(Slovakia) L Dlhopolcová	2	3
4	(United States) V Williams	6	6

Second round
(Slovenia) M Matevžič	6	6
(Indonesia) W Prakusya	2	3
(Spain) G León García	7	4	4
18	(France) S Testud	5	6	6
30	(United States) L Raymond	6	6
(United States) J Hopkins	2	1
(United States) M Tu	2	2
4	(United States) V Williams	6	6

Third round
(Slovenia) M Matevžič	2	2
18	(France) S Testud	6	6
30	(United States) L Raymond	3	4
4	(United States) V Williams	6	6

Fourth round
18	(France) S Testud	4	0
4	(United States) V Williams	6	6

==== Section 7 ====
First round
8	(France) A Mauresmo	3	6	6
(Russia) A Myskina	6	1	4
(Slovakia) J Husárová	7^{7}	6
(Slovakia) Ľ Cervanová	6^{2}	4
Q	(Czech Republic) A Gerši	6	6
(Russia) E Bovina	3	2
(Germany) J Kandarr	4	6	3
28	(United States) C Rubin	6	3	6
22	(Uzbekistan) I Tulyaganova	6	6
(Spain) M Marrero	1	4
(Spain) A Medina Garrigues	2	1
Q	(Canada) J Nejedly	6	6
(Hungary) A Kapros	1	4
Q	(Slovenia) K Srebotnik	6	6
(Zimbabwe) C Black	6	3	2
9	(France) N Tauziat	4	6	6

Second round
8	(France) A Mauresmo	7^{8}	6
(Slovakia) J Husárová	6^{6}	2
Q	(Czech Republic) A Gerši	4	1
28	(United States) C Rubin	6	6
22	(Uzbekistan) I Tulyaganova	6	3	4
Q	(Canada) J Nejedly	1	6	6
Q	(Slovenia) K Srebotnik	5	6	3
9	(France) N Tauziat	7	1	6

Third round
8	(France) A Mauresmo	7	7
28	(United States) C Rubin	5	5
Q	(Canada) J Nejedly	1	6	3
9	(France) N Tauziat	6	3	6

Fourth round
8	(France) A Mauresmo	6	6^{1}	6
9	(France) N Tauziat	0	7^{7}	3

==== Section 8 ====
First round
15	(Bulgaria) M Maleeva	6	6
(Czech Republic) K Hrdličková	2	1
(Australia) A Molik	4	6	6
WC	(United States) B Mattek	6	2	4
(Tunisia) S Sfar	6	5	6
(Slovenia) T Pisnik	2	7	4
WC	(United States) A Stevenson	1	3
19	(Austria) B Schett	6	6
32	(Italy) F Schiavone	1	3
(Spain) V Ruano Pascual	6	6
Q	(Austria) E Fauth	6	7^{8}
(France) A-G Sidot	4	6^{6}
(Spain) MJ Martínez Sánchez	1	1
(Australia) E Dominikovic	6	6
Q	(Netherlands) A Hopmans	2	1
2	(United States) J Capriati	6	6

Second round
15	(Bulgaria) M Maleeva	3	6	3
(Australia) A Molik	6	3	6
(Tunisia) S Sfar	4	6^{5}
19	(Austria) B Schett	6	7^{7}
(Spain) V Ruano Pascual	5	6	6
Q	(Austria) E Fauth	7	2	4
(Australia) E Dominikovic	2	0
2	(United States) J Capriati	6	6

Third round
(Australia) A Molik	5	6	3
19	(Austria) B Schett	7	3	6
(Spain) V Ruano Pascual	4	4
2	(United States) J Capriati	6	6

Fourth round
19	(Austria) B Schett	3	3
2	(United States) J Capriati	6	6

Preceded by 2001 Wimbledon Championships – Women's singles	Grand Slam women's singles	Succeeded by 2002 Australian Open – Women's singles
