= 2001 US Open – Men's doubles =

Event

Men's doubles
- 2001 US Open

Final
- Champions: (Zimbabwe) Wayne Black (Zimbabwe) Kevin Ullyett
- Runners-up: (United States) Donald Johnson (United States) Jared Palmer
- Score: 7–6, 2–6, 6–3
- Date: September 8, 2001

Details
- Draw: 64
- Seeds: 16

Events
Singles	men	women		boys	girls
Doubles	men	women	mixed	boys	girls
WC Singles	men	women	quad
WC Doubles	men	women	quad
Legends	men	women	mixed
- US Open

The 2001 US Open was held between August 27 – September 9, 2001. It was the final Grand Slam event of 2001.

== Seeds ==
Champion seeds are indicated in bold text while text in italics indicates the round in which those seeds were eliminated.

1. (Sweden) Jonas Björkman / (Australia) Todd Woodbridge (third round)
2. (United States) Donald Johnson / (United States) Jared Palmer (final)
3. (Czech Republic) Jiří Novák / (Czech Republic) David Rikl (third round)
4. (Belarus) Max Mirnyi / (Australia) Sandon Stolle (semifinals)
5. (India) Mahesh Bhupathi / (India) Leander Paes (first round)
6. (Canada) Daniel Nestor / (Federal Republic of Yugoslavia) Nenad Zimonjić (third round)
7. (Czech Republic) Petr Pála / (Czech Republic) Pavel Vízner (third round)
8. (United States) Bob Bryan / (United States) Mike Bryan (second round)
9. (South Africa) Wayne Ferreira / (Russia) Yevgeny Kafelnikov (second round)
10. (The Bahamas) Mark Knowles / (United States) Brian MacPhie (quarterfinals)
11. (Australia) Wayne Arthurs / (Australia) Michael Hill (third round)
12. (South Africa) Ellis Ferreira / (United States) Rick Leach (quarterfinals)
13. (Australia) Joshua Eagle / (Australia) Andrew Florent (third round)
14. (Zimbabwe) **Wayne Black** / (Zimbabwe) **Kevin Ullyett (champions)**
15. (Netherlands) Paul Haarhuis / (Netherlands) Sjeng Schalken (semifinals)
16. (Argentina) Martín García / (Czech Republic) Cyril Suk (second round)

== Draw ==
Key

- Q = Qualifier
- WC = Wild card
- LL = Lucky loser
- Alt = Alternate
- ITF = ITF entry
- PR = Protected ranking
- SR = Special ranking
- SE = Special exempt
- JE = Junior exempt
- JR = Junior Accelerator Programme entrant
- CO = College Accelerator Programme entrant
- NG = Next Gen Accelerator Program entrant
- w/o = Walkover
- r = Retired
- d = Defaulted

=== Finals ===
Quarterfinals
15	(Netherlands) **Paul Haarhuis** **(Netherlands) Sjeng Schalken**	**6**	**6**
10	(The Bahamas) Mark Knowles (United States) Brian MacPhie	4	4
14	(Zimbabwe) **Wayne Black** **(Zimbabwe) Kevin Ullyett**	**6**	**7**
12	(South Africa) Ellis Ferreira (United States) Rick Leach	4	6^{4}
PR	(Italy) Massimo Bertolini (United States) Devin Bowen	6^{3}	4
4	(Belarus) **Max Mirnyi** **(Australia) Sandon Stolle**	**7**	**6**
(South Africa) John-Laffnie de Jager (South Africa) Robbie Koenig	2	**6**	1
2	(United States) **Donald Johnson** **(United States) Jared Palmer**	**6**	3	**6**

Semifinals
15	(Netherlands) Paul Haarhuis (Netherlands) Sjeng Schalken	3	4
14	(Zimbabwe) **Wayne Black** **(Zimbabwe) Kevin Ullyett**	**6**	**6**
4	(Belarus) Max Mirnyi (Australia) Sandon Stolle	4	**6**	3
2	(United States) **Donald Johnson** **(United States) Jared Palmer**	**6**	3	**6**

Final
14	(Zimbabwe) **Wayne Black** **(Zimbabwe) Kevin Ullyett**	**7**	2	**6**
2	(United States) Donald Johnson (United States) Jared Palmer	6^{9}	**6**	3

=== Top half ===
==== Section 1 ====
First round
1	(Sweden) **J Björkman** **(Australia) T Woodbridge**	**6**	**6**
(United States) S Humphries (Philippines) E Taino	4	2
(Japan) **T Shimada** **(South Africa) M Wakefield**	**6**	**6**
(Austria) J Knowle (Switzerland) L Manta	2	0
(Argentina) **L Arnold** **(Argentina) L Lobo**	0	**7**	**6**
(South Africa) B Haygarth (The Bahamas) M Merklein	**6**	5	2
15	(Netherlands) **P Haarhuis** **(Netherlands) S Schalken**	**6**	**6**
WC	(United States) M Russell (United States) C Woodruff	3	4
10	(The Bahamas) **M Knowles** **(United States) B MacPhie**	**7**	**6**
Q	(Federal Republic of Yugoslavia) D Petrović (Israel) A Ram	6^{5}	2
(North Macedonia) **A Kitinov** **(South Africa) Jason Weir-Smith**	**7**	**7**
(Argentina) G Etlis (Argentina) M Rodríguez	5	6^{8}
(France) **A Clément** **(France) N Escudé**	**7**	3	**6**
(Sweden) S Aspelin (Australia) A Kratzmann	6^{5}	**6**	1
7	(Czech Republic) **P Pála** **(Czech Republic) P Vízner**	**7**	**6**
(Spain) T Carbonell (Ecuador) N Lapentti	6^{6}	3

Second round
1	(Sweden) **J Björkman** **(Australia) T Woodbridge**	**7**	**6**
(Japan) T Shimada (South Africa) M Wakefield	5	2
(Argentina) L Arnold (Argentina) L Lobo	**7**	2	6^{5}
15	(Netherlands) **P Haarhuis** **(Netherlands) S Schalken**	6^{4}	**6**	**7**
10	(The Bahamas) **M Knowles** **(United States) B MacPhie**	6^{5}	**6**	**6**
(North Macedonia) A Kitinov (South Africa) Jason Weir-Smith	**7**	4	4
(France) A Clément (France) N Escudé
7	(Czech Republic) **P Pála** **(Czech Republic) P Vízner**	w/o

Third round
1	(Sweden) J Björkman (Australia) T Woodbridge	**6**	3	6^{5}
15	(Netherlands) **P Haarhuis** **(Netherlands) S Schalken**	1	**6**	**7**
10	(The Bahamas) **M Knowles** **(United States) B MacPhie**	**6**	**7**
7	(Czech Republic) P Pála (Czech Republic) P Vízner	3	6^{3}

Quarterfinals
15	(Netherlands) **P Haarhuis** **(Netherlands) S Schalken**	**6**	**6**
10	(The Bahamas) M Knowles (United States) B MacPhie	4	4

==== Section 2 ====
First round
3	(Czech Republic) **J Novák** **(Czech Republic) D Rikl**	3	**6**	**6**
(South Africa) C Haggard (Belgium) T Vanhoudt	**6**	2	3
(Australia) **D Macpherson** **(South Africa) G Stafford**	2	**6**	**6**
(Spain) J Balcells (Spain) A Portas	**6**	3	2
(Zimbabwe) **B Black** **(United States) J Stark**	**6**	**6**
(United States) J Gimelstob (United States) A O'Brien	4	0
14	(Zimbabwe) **W Black** **(Zimbabwe) K Ullyett**	**6**	**6**
WC	(United States) B Hawk (United States) R Kendrick	3	2
12	(South Africa) **E Ferreira** **(United States) R Leach**	**6**	**6**
Q	(South Africa) N Godwin (South Africa) M Ondruska	4	2
(Slovakia) **D Hrbatý** **(Belarus) V Voltchkov**	**6**	**6**
(Argentina) M Hood (Argentina) S Prieto	4	4
WC	(United States) **J Blake** **(United States) R Ginepri**	**6**	6^{4}	**6**
(Argentina) P Albano (Germany) M-K Goellner	3	**7**	1
6	(Canada) **D Nestor** **(Federal Republic of Yugoslavia) N Zimonjić**	**6**	**6**
Q	(Israel) N Behr (Israel) H Levy	4	3

Second round
3	(Czech Republic) **J Novák** **(Czech Republic) D Rikl**	**6**	**6**
(Australia) D Macpherson (South Africa) G Stafford	4	4
(Zimbabwe) B Black (United States) J Stark	1	6^{3}
14	(Zimbabwe) **W Black** **(Zimbabwe) K Ullyett**	**6**	**7**
12	(South Africa) **E Ferreira** **(United States) R Leach**	**6**	**6**
(Slovakia) D Hrbatý (Belarus) V Voltchkov	4	;3
WC	(United States) J Blake (United States) R Ginepri	3	6^{3}
6	(Canada) **D Nestor** **(Federal Republic of Yugoslavia) N Zimonjić**	**6**	**7**

Third round
3	(Czech Republic) J Novák (Czech Republic) D Rikl	**6**	2	4
14	(Zimbabwe) **W Black** **(Zimbabwe) K Ullyett**	2	**6**	**6**
12	(South Africa) **E Ferreira** **(United States) R Leach**	**6**	3	**6**
6	(Canada) D Nestor (Federal Republic of Yugoslavia) N Zimonjić	3	**6**	4

Quarterfinals
14	(Zimbabwe) **W Black** **(Zimbabwe) K Ullyett**	**6**	**7**
12	(South Africa) E Ferreira (United States) R Leach	4	6^{4}

=== Bottom half ===
==== Section 3 ====
First round
(Argentina) **S Roitman** **(Argentina) A Schneiter**	**7**	**6**
5	(India) M Bhupathi (India) L Paes	6^{4}	1
PR	(Italy) **M Bertolini** **(United States) D Bowen**	4	**6**	**6**
PR	(Spain) JI Carrasco (Czech Republic) D Škoch	**6**	2	2
WC	(United States) **M Fish** **(United States) J Morrison**	**6**	4	**6**
(Spain) G Puentes (Brazil) A Sá	4	**6**	3
9	(South Africa) **W Ferreira** **(Russia) Y Kafelnikov**	**6**	**6**
(United States) J Tarango (Czech Republic) D Vacek	4	2
13	(Australia) **J Eagle** **(Australia) A Florent**	**7**	**6**
(Sweden) J Landsberg (Sweden) P Nyborg	5	4
PR	(Australia) **B Ellwood** **(Canada) S Lareau**	**6**	**6**
(South Africa) D Adams (France) M Llodra	2	1
(Brazil) **J Oncins** **(Argentina) D Orsanic**	4	**7**	**6**
(Netherlands) J Siemerink (United States) J Waite	**6**	6^{6}	4
4	(Belarus) **M Mirnyi** **(Australia) S Stolle**	**6**	**6**
(Russia) A Olhovskiy (France) F Santoro	3	4

Second round
(Argentina) S Roitman (Argentina) A Schneiter	0	2
PR	(Italy) **M Bertolini** **(United States) D Bowen**	**6**	**6**
WC	(United States) **M Fish** **(United States) J Morrison**	**6**	**6**
9	(South Africa) W Ferreira (Russia) Y Kafelnikov	2	3
13	(Australia) **J Eagle** **(Australia) A Florent**	2	**6**	**6**
PR	(Australia) B Ellwood (Canada) S Lareau	**6**	4	4
(Brazil) J Oncins (Argentina) D Orsanic	6^{4}	1
4	(Belarus) **M Mirnyi** **(Australia) S Stolle**	**7**	**6**

Third round
PR	(Italy) **M Bertolini** **(United States) D Bowen**	**7**	6^{2}	**7**
WC	(United States) M Fish (United States) J Morrison	6^{8}	**7**	6^{3}
13	(Australia) J Eagle (Australia) A Florent	6^{2}	6^{4}
4	(Belarus) **M Mirnyi** **(Australia) S Stolle**	**7**	**7**

Quarterfinals
PR	(Italy) M Bertolini (United States) D Bowen	6^{3}	4
4	(Belarus) **M Mirnyi** **(Australia) S Stolle**	**7**	**6**

==== Section 4 ====
First round
8	(United States) **B Bryan** **(United States) M Bryan**	**6**	2
Q	(Italy) A Gaudenzi (Switzerland) M Rosset	2	0R
(South Africa) **J-L de Jager** **(South Africa) R Koenig**	**6**	**6**
(Czech Republic) P Luxa (Czech Republic) R Štěpánek	4	2
(Czech Republic) **T Cibulec** **(Czech Republic) L Friedl**	**6**	**7**
WC	(United States) T Dent (United States) P Goldstein	4	6^{5}
11	(Australia) **W Arthurs** **(Australia) M Hill**	**6**	**6**
(Australia) P Hanley (Australia) N Healey	4	4
16	(Argentina) **M García** **(Czech Republic) C Suk**	2	**6**	**7**
(Czech Republic) F Čermák (Czech Republic) O Fukárek	**6**	3	6^{2}
(Czech Republic) **M Damm** **(Germany) D Prinosil**	4	**6**	**6**
(Germany) K Braasch (Switzerland) I Heuberger	**6**	3	4
(South Africa) **M Barnard** **(United States) J Thomas**	**6**	**6**
WC	(United States) R Ram (United States) J Stokke	4	2
2	(United States) **D Johnson** **(United States) J Palmer**	**7**	**6**
WC	(United States) K Kim (United States) G Weiner	5	3

Second round
8	(United States) B Bryan (United States) M Bryan	**7**	2	3
(South Africa) **J-L de Jager** **(South Africa) Robbie Koenig**	6^{2}	**6**	**6**
(Czech Republic) T Cibulec (Czech Republic) L Friedl	3	4
11	(Australia) **W Arthurs** **(Australia) M Hill**	**6**	**6**
16	(Argentina) M García (Czech Republic) C Suk	5	1
(Czech Republic) **M Damm** **(Germany) D Prinosil**	**7**	**6**
(South Africa) M Barnard (United States) J Thomas	5	**6**	2
2	(United States) **D Johnson** **(United States) J Palmer**	**7**	3	**6**

Third round
(South Africa) **J-L de Jager** **(South Africa) Robbie Koenig**	**7**	**6**
11	(Australia) W Arthurs (Australia) M Hill	6^{6}	1
(Czech Republic) M Damm (Germany) D Prinosil	4	**7**	0
2	(United States) **D Johnson** **(United States) J Palmer**	**6**	5	**6**

Quarterfinals
(South Africa) J-L de Jager (South Africa) Robbie Koenig	2	**6**	1
2	(United States) **D Johnson** **(United States) J Palmer**	**6**	3	**6**
