= 2001 US Open – Mixed doubles =

Mixed doubles
- 2001 US Open

Final
- Champions: (Australia) Rennae Stubbs (Australia) Todd Woodbridge
- Runners-up: (United States) Lisa Raymond (India) Leander Paes
- Score: 6–4, 5–7, [11–9]
- Date: September 7, 2001

Details
- Draw: 32
- Seeds: 8

Events
Singles	men	women		boys	girls
Doubles	men	women	mixed	boys	girls
WC Singles	men	women	quad
WC Doubles	men	women	quad
Legends	men	women	mixed
- US Open

Arantxa Sánchez Vicario and Jared Palmer were the defending champions, but lost in the quarterfinals to Ai Sugiyama and Ellis Ferreira.

Rennae Stubbs and Todd Woodbridge won the title by defeating Lisa Raymond and Leander Paes 6–4, 5–7, [11–9] in the final.

This was the first US Open to introduce a super tie-break in lieu of the final tie-break set.

== Seeds ==
1. (Australia) Rennae Stubbs / (Australia) Todd Woodbridge (champions)
2. (United States) Lisa Raymond / (India) Leander Paes (final)
3. (United States) Kimberly Po-Messerli / (United States) Donald Johnson (semifinals)
4. (Spain) Arantxa Sánchez Vicario / (United States) Jared Palmer (quarterfinals)
5. (Japan) Ai Sugiyama / (South Africa) Ellis Ferreira (semifinals)
6. (Federal Republic of Yugoslavia) Jelena Dokic / (India) Mahesh Bhupathi (first round)
7. (France) Anne-Gaëlle Sidot / (Australia) Sandon Stolle (quarterfinals)
8. (Russia) Elena Likhovtseva / (United States) Brian MacPhie (first round)

== Draw ==
Key

- Q = Qualifier
- WC = Wild card
- LL = Lucky loser
- Alt = Alternate
- ITF = ITF entry
- PR = Protected ranking
- SR = Special ranking
- SE = Special exempt
- JE = Junior exempt
- JR = Junior Accelerator Programme entrant
- CO = College Accelerator Programme entrant
- NG = Next Gen Accelerator Program entrant
- w/o = Walkover
- r = Retired
- d = Defaulted

=== Finals ===
Semifinals
1	(Australia) Rennae Stubbs (Australia) Todd Woodbridge	6	6
5	(Japan) Ai Sugiyama (South Africa) Ellis Ferreira	3	4
3	(United States) Kimberly Po-Messerli (United States) Donald Johnson	6^{3}	4
2	(United States) Lisa Raymond (India) Leander Paes	7^{7}	6

Final
1	(Australia) Rennae Stubbs (Australia) Todd Woodbridge	6	5	[11]
2	(United States) Lisa Raymond (India) Leander Paes	4	7	[9]

=== Top half ===
First round
1	(Australia) R Stubbs (Australia) T Woodbridge	6	7^{7}
(United States) M Navratilova (Belarus) M Mirnyi	3	6^{3}
WC	(United States) J Capriati (United States) S Capriati	5	3
(Spain) V Ruano Pascual (Argentina) L Arnold Ker	7	6
(Spain) A Medina Garrigues (United States) J Tarango	4	6	[10]
(France) A Fusai (Zimbabwe) K Ullyett	6	2	[6]
(Argentina) P Suárez (Argentina) M García	5	2
7	(France) A-G Sidot (Australia) S Stolle	7	6
4	(Spain) A Sánchez Vicario (United States) J Palmer	6	6
WC	(United States) K Schlukebir (United States) P Goldstein	4	4
(Slovenia) K Srebotnik (Federal Republic of Yugoslavia) N Zimonjić	4	6	[7]
(Sweden) Å Carlsson (Czech Republic) P Vízner	6	3	[10]
(Slovakia) K Habšudová (Czech Republic) D Rikl	6	6
(Slovakia) J Husárová (Czech Republic) P Pála	1	3
(United States) M Shaughnessy (Czech Republic) C Suk	4	5
5	(Japan) A Sugiyama (South Africa) E Ferreira	6	7

Second round
1	(Australia) R Stubbs (Australia) T Woodbridge	6	6
(Spain) V Ruano Pascual (Argentina) L Arnold Ker	2	2
(Spain) A Medina Garrigues (United States) J Tarango	3	2
7	(France) A-G Sidot (Australia) S Stolle	6	6
4	(Spain) A Sánchez Vicario (United States) J Palmer	4	6	[10]
(Sweden) Å Carlsson (Czech Republic) P Vízner	6	3	[6]
(Slovakia) K Habšudová (Czech Republic) D Rikl	5	6	[4]
5	(Japan) A Sugiyama (South Africa) E Ferreira	7	2	[10]

Quarterfinals
1	(Australia) R Stubbs (Australia) T Woodbridge	6	7^{7}
7	(France) A-G Sidot (Australia) S Stolle	4	6^{1}
4	(Spain) A Sánchez Vicario (United States) J Palmer	5	6^{8}
5	(Japan) A Sugiyama (South Africa) E Ferreira	7	7^{10}

Semifinals
1	(Australia) R Stubbs (Australia) T Woodbridge	6	6
5	(Japan) A Sugiyama (South Africa) E Ferreira	3	4

=== Bottom half ===
First round
6	(Federal Republic of Yugoslavia) J Dokic (India) M Bhupathi	4	4
(Zimbabwe) C Black (Zimbabwe) W Black	6	6
(United States) N Arendt (United States) R Leach	6	2	[8]
(Australia) N Pratt (Australia) A Florent	4	6	[10]
WC	(United States) A Stevenson (United States) A O'Brien	3	6^{4}
(Netherlands) C Vis (South Africa) D Adams	6	7^{7}
WC	(United States) M Bradley (United States) J Gimelstob	3	2
3	(United States) K Po-Messerli (United States) D Johnson	6	6
8	(Russia) E Likhovtseva (United States) B MacPhie	5	6	[6]
(Argentina) P Tarabini (Australia) M Hill	7	2	[10]
WC	(United States) A Harkleroad (United States) J Blake	3	5
(Ukraine) E Tatarkova (The Bahamas) M Knowles	6	7
(Austria) B Schett (Australia) J Eagle	7	6
(Slovenia) T Križan (United States) B Bryan	5	3
(Belgium) E Callens (Belgium) T Vanhoudt	3	6^{4}
2	(United States) L Raymond (India) L Paes	6	7^{7}

Second round
(Zimbabwe) C Black (Zimbabwe) W Black	1	6	[10]
(Australia) N Pratt (Australia) A Florent	6	3	[7]
(Netherlands) C Vis (South Africa) D Adams	7^{7}	5	[9]
3	(United States) K Po-Messerli (United States) D Johnson	6^{3}	7	[11]
(Argentina) P Tarabini (Australia) M Hill	2	5
(Ukraine) E Tatarkova (The Bahamas) M Knowles	6	7
(Austria) B Schett (Australia) J Eagle	5	3
2	(United States) L Raymond (India) L Paes	7	6

Quarterfinals
(Zimbabwe) C Black (Zimbabwe) W Black	3	4
3	(United States) K Po-Messerli (United States) D Johnson	6	6
(Ukraine) E Tatarkova (The Bahamas) M Knowles	2	3
2	(United States) L Raymond (India) L Paes	6	6

Semifinals
3	(United States) K Po-Messerli (United States) D Johnson	6^{3}	4
2	(United States) L Raymond (India) L Paes	7^{7}	6
