= Rennae Stubbs =

Australian tennis player (born 1971)

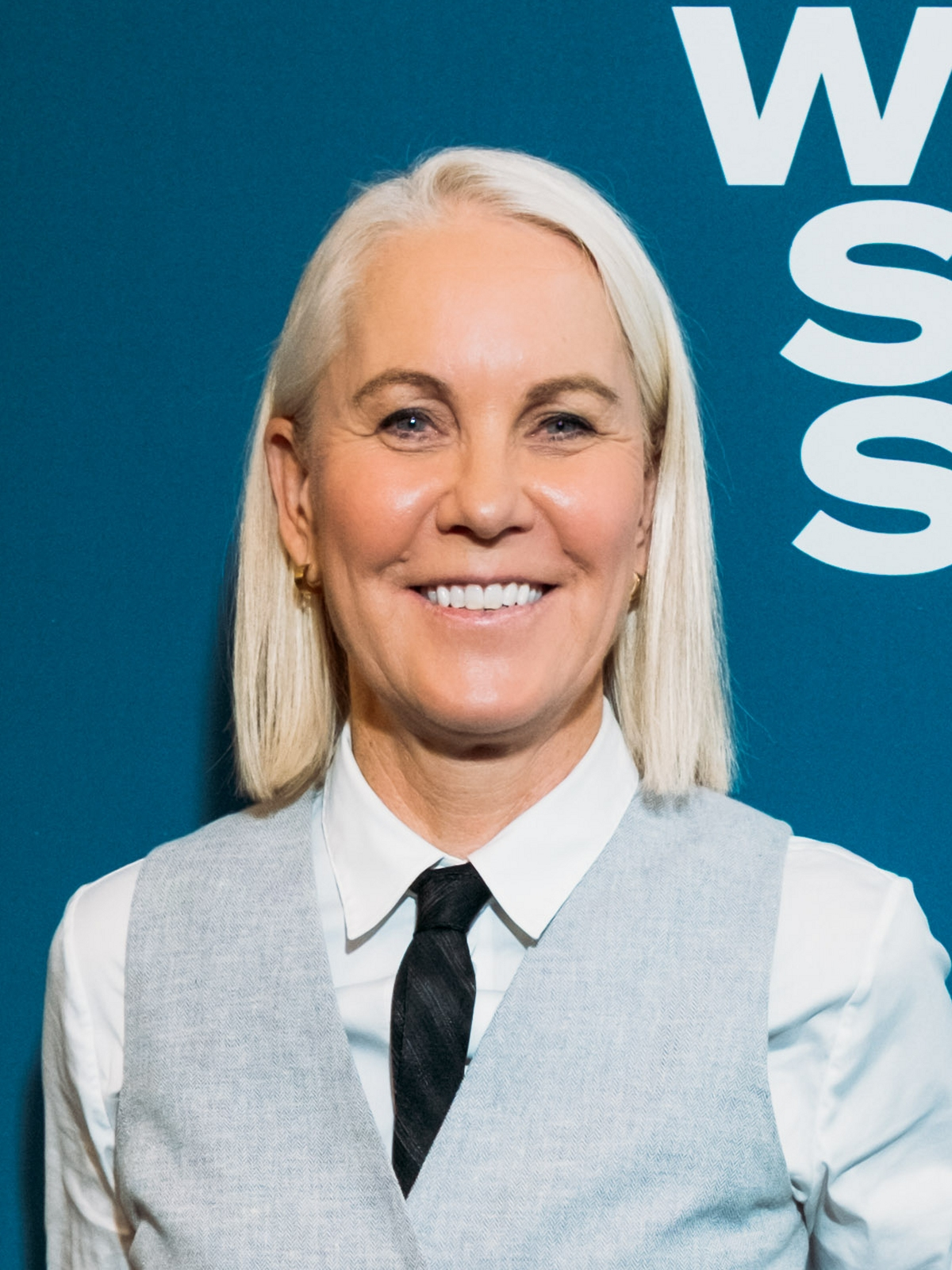
- Stubbs hosting at BOWS (2025)
- Country (sports): Australia
- Residence: Sydney, Australia and Tampa, Florida, US
- Born: 26 March 1971 (age 55) Sydney, Australia
- Height: 1.78 m (5 ft 10 in)
- Turned pro: 1992
- Retired: 2011
- Plays: Right-handed (one-handed backhand)
- Prize money: $5,198,172

Singles
- Career record: 20–176
- Career titles: 0 WTA, 2 ITF
- Highest ranking: No. 64 (14 October 1996)

Grand Slam singles results
- Australian Open: 2R (1989, 1992, 1996)
- French Open: 1R (1992, 1996)
- Wimbledon: 2R (1992, 1995)
- US Open: 1R (1995, 1996)

Doubles
- Career record: 809–361
- Career titles: 60 WTA, 10 ITF
- Highest ranking: No. 1 (21 August 2000)

Grand Slam doubles results
- Australian Open: W (2000)
- French Open: F (2002)
- Wimbledon: W (2001, 2004)
- US Open: W (2001)

Other doubles tournaments
- Tour Finals: W (2001)

Mixed doubles
- Career titles: 2

Grand Slam mixed doubles results
- Australian Open: W (2000)
- French Open: F (2000)
- Wimbledon: SF (2010)
- US Open: W (2001)

Rennae Stubbs OLY (born 26 March 1971) is an Australian former professional tennis player, coach and television commentator. She was ranked number 1 in the world in doubles, and the winner of 4 major doubles titles and 2 mixed doubles titles as well as 66 WTA doubles titles. She is the host of "The Rennae Stubbs Tennis Podcast". She worked at the Seven Network between 2011 and 2018 as an analyst and is now a full time commentator for ESPN tennis. She was an Australian Institute of Sport scholarship holder. In January 2019, Stubbs received the OLY post-nominal title at the Brisbane International tournament. She is also the longest-serving member of the Australian BJK Cup team.

== Playing career ==
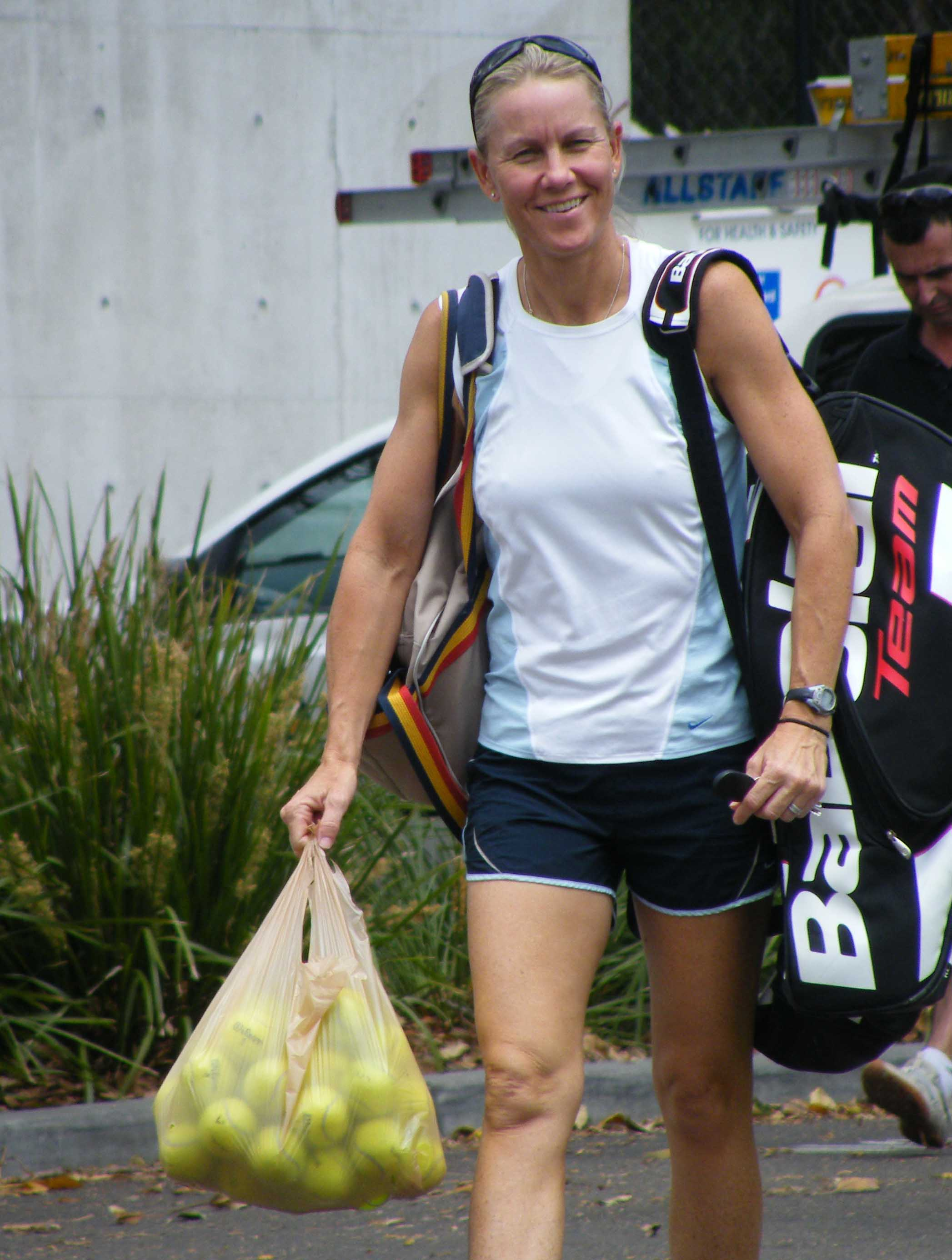
Stubbs at the NSW Tennis Open (2009).

Stubbs reached a singles ranking of number 64, her highest, on the WTA Tour. It was in doubles, however, that she was particularly outstanding, winning four major doubles titles and two mixed-doubles titles. She was ranked world number 1 in doubles in 2000. She represented Australia at four successive Summer Olympic Games: Atlanta 1996; Sydney 2000; Athens 2004; and Beijing 2008.

Stubbs has recorded more doubles triumphs than any other Australian woman—60 from 1992 to the conclusion of the 2010 WTA Tour—enjoying success with eleven different partners. In 2001, Stubbs won the season-ending WTA Championships with regular partner Lisa Raymond and the pair were named ITF World Champions.

Stubbs is the longest-serving member of the Australia Fed Cup team, having played for 17 years since 1992, with a 28–9 win–loss record in doubles; the second highest in Australian Fed Cup Team history behind Wendy Turnbull (29–8). She retired from Fed Cup play after the 2011 Fed Cup tie with Italy. Stubbs played on the WTA Tour for the rest of 2011 mostly with Casey Dellacqua and played her last tour match at the 2011 US Open with Dellacqua. She then finished her career winning the World TeamTennis title for the third time with the Washington Kastles, her fifth overall WTT title.

== Broadcasting ==
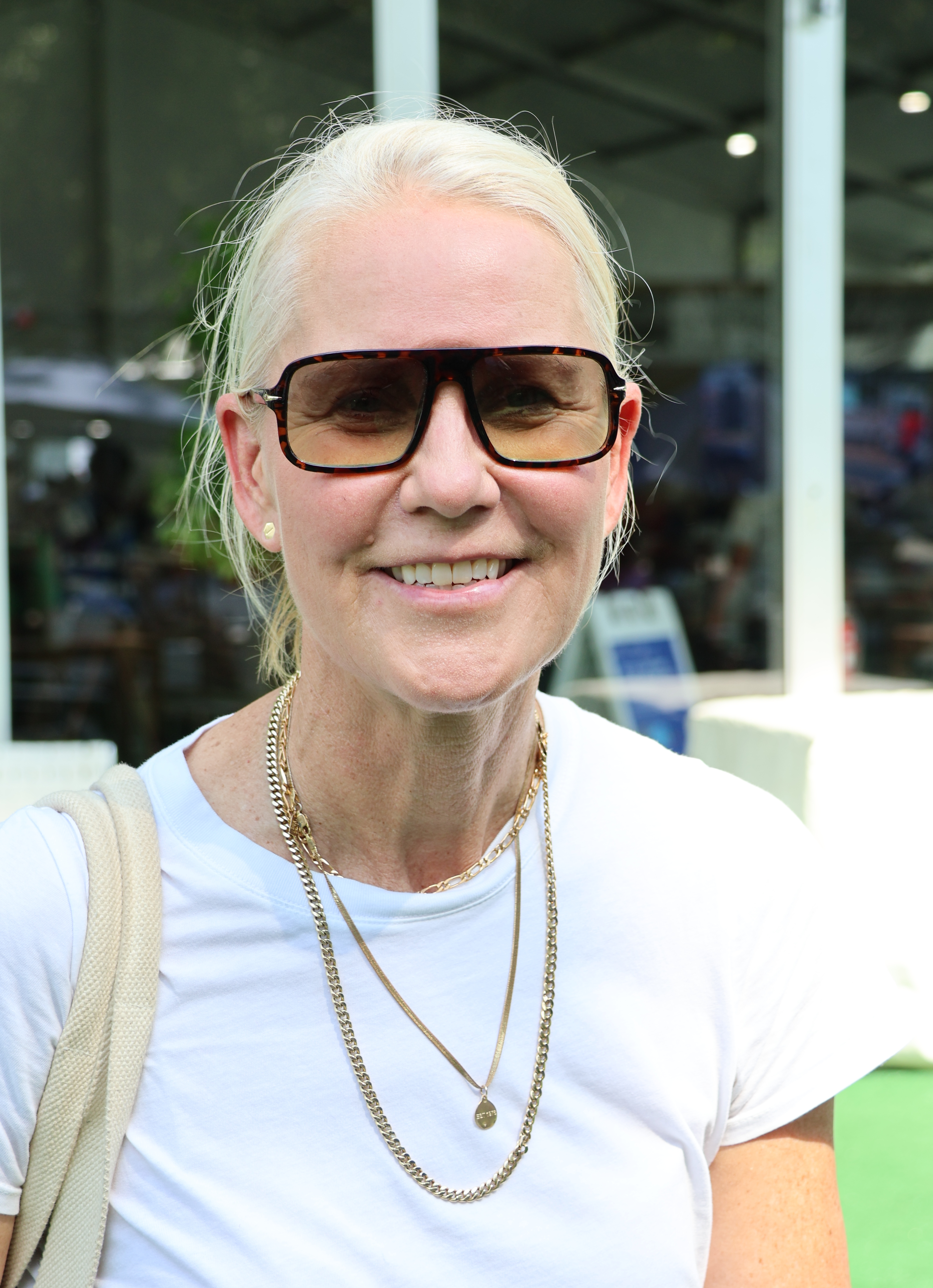
Stubbs (2023).

Stubbs transitioned from her playing days immediately into a successful television career as a commentator and host for TV Networks including, ESPN, Tennis Channel and Channel Seven Australia and as the host of her own sports show, The Power Hour on Amazon in 2024. She also worked as the lead female analyst at the 2012 London the 2016 Rio and the 2020 Tokyo and the Paris Olympics for NBC . She is currently hosting the podcast "The French Connection" with Sam Querrey for NBC Sports and Racquet.

In 2022, Embassy Row announced that Stubbs would host The Power Hour on Amazon Prime Video. On November 14, 2022, Stubbs made her debut on The Power Hour.

== Coaching ==
From August 2018 until spring 2019, Stubbs was coach of Karolína Plíšková. Stubbs subsequently was added to the coaching team of Samantha Stosur. Originally, she was only expected to finish out the 2019 season with Stosur, however, given Stosur's success at the end of 2019, the pair decided to continue on in 2020, starting in Australia. With Stubbs as her coach, Stosur won one major title, the 2021 US Open doubles, with playing partner Zhang Shuai. Stubbs also coached Genie Bouchard throughout 2020 where Bouchard improved her ranking from 330 to 120 on the WTA rankings.

For the 2022 US Open, Stubbs was the coach for Serena Williams as she contested her final major tournament. Williams lost in the third round.

== Grand Slam tournament finals ==
=== Doubles: 7 (4–3) ===
Result	Year	Championship	Surface	Partner	Opponents	Score
Loss	1995	US Open	Hard	(Netherlands) Brenda Schultz-McCarthy	(United States) Gigi Fernández (Belarus) Natasha Zvereva	7–5, 6–3
Win	2000	Australian Open	Hard	(United States) Lisa Raymond	(Switzerland) Martina Hingis (France) Mary Pierce	6–4, 5–7, 6–4
Win	2001	Wimbledon	Grass	(United States) Lisa Raymond	(Belgium) Kim Clijsters (Japan) Ai Sugiyama	6–4, 6–3
Win	2001	US Open	Hard	(United States) Lisa Raymond	(United States) Kimberly Po (France) Nathalie Tauziat	6–2, 5–7, 7–5
Loss	2002	French Open	Clay	(United States) Lisa Raymond	(Spain) Virginia Ruano Pascual (Argentina) Paola Suárez	6–4, 6–2
Win	2004	Wimbledon	Grass	(Zimbabwe) Cara Black	(South Africa) Liezel Huber (Japan) Ai Sugiyama	6–3, 7–6^{(7–5)}
Loss	2009	Wimbledon	Grass	(Australia) Samantha Stosur	(United States) Serena Williams (United States) Venus Williams	7–6^{(7–4)}, 6–4

=== Mixed doubles: 3 (2–1) ===
Result	Year	Championship	Surface	Partner	Opponents	Score
Win	2000	Australian Open	Hard	(United States) Jared Palmer	(Australia) Todd Woodbridge (Spain) Arantxa Sánchez Vicario	7–5, 7–6^{(7–3)}
Loss	2000	French Open	Clay	(Australia) Todd Woodbridge	(South Africa) David Adams (South Africa) Mariaan de Swardt	6–3, 3–6, 6–3
Win	2001	US Open	Hard	(Australia) Todd Woodbridge	(United States) Lisa Raymond (India) Leander Paes	6–4, 5–7, [11–9]

== WTA career finals ==
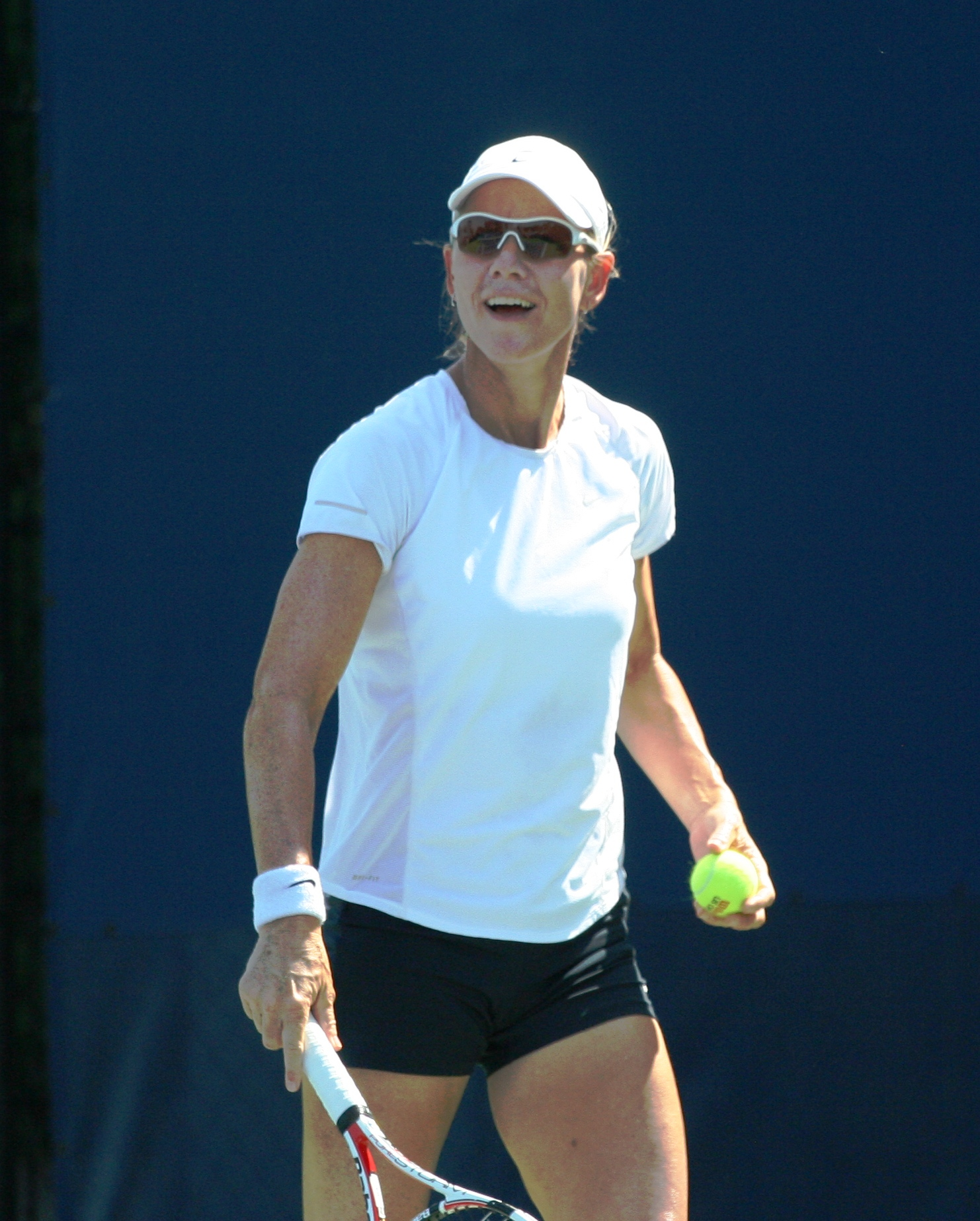
Stubbs at the US Open (2010).

=== Doubles: 103 (60–43) ===
Legend before 2009	Legend starting in 2009
Grand Slam tournaments (4–3)
WTA Championships (1–4)
Tier I (19–9)	Premier Mandatory (0–0)
Tier II (26–16)	Premier 5 (0–2)
Tier III (8–5)	Premier (1–2)
Tier IV & V (1–1)	International (0–0)
other (0–1)

Result	No.	Date	Tournament	Surface	Partner	Opponents	Score
Win	1.	9 February 1992	Asian Open Osaka, Japan	Carpet (i)	(Czech Republic) Helena Suková	(United States) Sandy Collins (Australia) Rachel McQuillan	3–6, 6–4, 7–5
Win	2.	3 May 1992	Hamburg Cup, Germany	Clay	(Germany) Steffi Graf	(Netherlands) Manon Bollegraf (Spain) Arantxa Sánchez Vicario	4–6, 6–3, 6–4
Win	3.	14 June 1992	Birmingham Classic, UK	Grass	(United States) Lori McNeil	(United States) Sandy Collins (South Africa) Elna Reinach	5–7, 6–3, 8–6
Win	4.	23 August 1992	Canadian Open	Hard	(United States) Lori McNeil	(United States) Gigi Fernández (Belarus) Natasha Zvereva	3–6, 7–5, 7–5
Loss	1.	17 January 1993	Sydney International, Australia	Hard	(United States) Lori McNeil	(United States) Pam Shriver (Australia) Elizabeth Smylie	7–6^{(4)}, 6–2
Loss	2.	1 February 1993	Pan Pacific Open, Japan	Carpet	(United States) Lori McNeil	(United States) Martina Navratilova (Czech Republic) Helena Suková	6–4, 6–3
Win	5.	15 March 1993	Indian Wells Masters, U.S.	Hard	(Czech Republic) Helena Suková	(United States) Ann Wunderlich (Canada) Patricia Hy	6–3, 6–4
Win	6.	2 May 1993	Hamburg Cup, Germany	Clay	(Germany) Steffi Graf	(Latvia) Larisa Neiland (Czech Republic) Jana Novotná	6–4, 7–6^{(5)}
Loss	3.	1 August 1993	Puerto Rico Open	Hard	(United States) Gigi Fernández	(United States) Ann Wunderlich (United States) Debbie Graham	5–7, 7–5, 7–5
Win	7.	10 February 1994	Asian Open Osaka, Japan	Carpet	(Latvia) Larisa Neiland	(United States) Pam Shriver (Australia) Elizabeth Smylie	6–4, 6–7^{(2)}, 7–5
Win	8.	22 May 1994	Internationaux de Strasbourg, France	Clay	(United States) Lori McNeil	(Argentina) Patricia Tarabini (Netherlands) Caroline Vis	6–3, 3–6, 6–2
Loss	4.	5 February 1995	Pan Pacific Open, Japan	Carpet	(United States) Lindsay Davenport	(United States) Gigi Fernández (Belarus) Natasha Zvereva	6–0, 6–3
Loss	5.	19 February 1995	Paris Indoor, France	Carpet (i)	(Netherlands) Manon Bollegraf	(United States) Meredith McGrath (Latvia) Larisa Neiland	6–4, 6–1
Loss	6.	22 May 1995	World Doubles Cup, Scotland	Clay	(Netherlands) Manon Bollegraf	(United States) Meredith McGrath (Latvia) Larisa Neiland	6–2, 7–6^{(2)}
Win	9.	12 June 1995	Birmingham Classic, UK	Grass	(Netherlands) Manon Bollegraf	(Australia) Nicole Bradtke (Australia) Kristine Kunce	3–6, 6–4, 6–4
Loss	7.	10 September 1995	US Open	Hard	(Netherlands) Brenda Schultz-McCarthy	(United States) Gigi Fernández (Belarus) Natasha Zvereva	7–5, 6–3
Loss	8.	5 November 1995	Tournoi de Québec, Canada	Carpet (i)	(United States) Lisa Raymond	(United States) Nicole Arendt (Netherlands) Manon Bollegraf	7–6^{(6)}, 4–6, 6–2
Loss	9.	3 March 1996	Generali Ladies Linz, Austria	Carpet	(Czech Republic) Helena Suková	(United States) Meredith McGrath (Netherlands) Manon Bollegraf	6–4, 6–4
Win	10.	3 November 1996	Ameritech Cup, U.S.	Carpet	(United States) Lisa Raymond	(United States) Angela Lettiere (Japan) Nana Miyagi	6–1, 6–1
Win	11.	17 November 1996	Championships of Philadelphia, U.S.	Carpet	(United States) Lisa Raymond	(United States) Nicole Arendt (United States) Lori McNeil	6–4, 3–6, 6–3
Win	12.	26 October 1997	Tournoi de Québec, Canada	Carpet (i)	(United States) Lisa Raymond	(France) Alexandra Fusai (France) Nathalie Tauziat	6–4, 5–7, 7–5
Win	13.	16 November 1997	Championships of Philadelphia, U.S.	Carpet (i)	(United States) Lisa Raymond	(United States) Lindsay Davenport (United States) Jana Novotná	6–3, 7–5
Win	14.	22 February 1998	Hanover Grand Prix, Germany	Carpet	(United States) Lisa Raymond	(Russia) Elena Likhovtseva (Netherlands) Caroline Vis	6–1, 6–7^{(4)}, 6–3
Loss	10.	5 April 1998	Family Circle Cup, U.S.	Clay	(United States) Lisa Raymond	(Spain) Conchita Martínez (Argentina) Patricia Tarabini	3–6, 6–4, 6–4
Loss	11.	14 June 1998	Birmingham Classic, UK	Grass	(United States) Lisa Raymond	(Belgium) Els Callens (France) Julie Halard-Decugis	2–6, 6–4, 6–4
Win	15.	16 August 1998	Boston Cup, U.S.	Hard	(United States) Lisa Raymond	(South Africa) Mariaan de Swardt (United States) Mary Joe Fernández	6–4, 6–4
Loss	12.	25 October 1998	Kremlin Cup, Russia	Carpet	(United States) Lisa Raymond	(France) Mary Pierce (Belarus) Natasha Zvereva	6–3, 6–4
Win	16.	28 February 1999	Oklahoma Cup, U.S.	Hard (i)	(United States) Lisa Raymond	(South Africa) Amanda Coetzer (South Africa) Jessica Steck	6–3, 6–4
Loss	13.	11 April 1999	Amelia Island Championships, U.S.	Clay	(United States) Lisa Raymond	(Spain) Conchita Martínez (Argentina) Patricia Tarabini	7–5, 0–6, 6–4
Loss	14.	15 August 1999	LA Championships, U.S.	Hard	(United States) Lisa Raymond	(Spain) Arantxa Sánchez Vicario (Latvia) Larisa Neiland	6–2, 6–7^{(5)}, 6–0
Win	17.	29 August 1999	New Haven Open, U.S.	Hard	(United States) Lisa Raymond	(Russia) Elena Likhovtseva (Czech Republic) Jana Novotná	7–6^{(1)}, 6–2
Win	18.	17 October 1999	Zurich Open, Switzerland	Hard (i)	(United States) Lisa Raymond	(France) Nathalie Tauziat (Belarus) Natasha Zvereva	6–2, 6–2
Win	19.	24 October 1999	Kremlin Cup, Russia	Carpet (i)	(United States) Lisa Raymond	(France) Julie Halard-Decugis (Germany) Anke Huber	6–1, 6–0
Win	20.	14 November 1999	Championships of Philadelphia, U.S.	Carpet (i)	(United States) Lisa Raymond	(United States) Chanda Rubin (France) Sandrine Testud	6–1, 7–6^{(2)}
Win	21.	30 January 2000	Australian Open	Hard	(United States) Lisa Raymond	(Switzerland) Martina Hingis (France) Mary Pierce	6–4, 5–7, 6–4
Win	22.	21 May 2000	Italian Open	Clay	(United States) Lisa Raymond	(Spain) Arantxa Sánchez Vicario (Spain) Magüi Serna	6–3, 4–6, 6–2
Win	23.	28 May 2000	Madrid Open, Spain	Clay	(United States) Lisa Raymond	(Spain) Gala León García (Spain) María Sánchez Lorenzo	6–1, 6–3
Loss	15.	25 June 2000	Eastbourne International, UK	Grass	(United States) Lisa Raymond	(Japan) Ai Sugiyama (France) Nathalie Tauziat	2–6, 6–3, 7–6^{(3)}
Win	24.	6 August 2000	Southern California Open, U.S.	Hard	(United States) Lisa Raymond	(United States) Lindsay Davenport (Russia) Anna Kournikova	4–6, 6–3, 7–6^{(6)}
Loss	16.	12 November 2000	Championships of Philadelphia, U.S.	Carpet	(United States) Lisa Raymond	(Switzerland) Martina Hingis (Russia) Anna Kournikova	6–2, 7–5
Loss	17.	14 January 2001	Sydney International, Australia	Hard	(United States) Lisa Raymond	(Russia) Anna Kournikova (Austria) Barbara Schett	6–2, 7–5
Win	25.	4 February 2001	Pan Pacific Open, Japan	Carpet	(United States) Lisa Raymond	(Russia) Anna Kournikova (Uzbekistan) Iroda Tulyaganova	7–6^{(5)}, 2–6, 7–6^{(6)}
Win	26.	4 March 2001	Scottsdale Classic, U.S.	Hard	(United States) Lisa Raymond	(Belgium) Kim Clijsters (United States) Meghann Shaughnessy	w/o
Loss	18.	1 April 2001	Miami Open, U.S.	Hard	(United States) Lisa Raymond	(Spain) Arantxa Sánchez Vicario (France) Nathalie Tauziat	6–0, 6–4
Win	27.	22 April 2001	Charleston Open, U.S.	Clay	(United States) Lisa Raymond	(Spain) Virginia Ruano Pascual (Argentina) Paola Suárez	5–7, 7–6^{(5)}, 6–3
Loss	19.	26 May 2001	Madrid Open, Spain	Clay	(United States) Lisa Raymond	(Spain) Virginia Ruano Pascual (Argentina) Paola Suárez	7–5, 2–6, 7–6^{(4)}
Win	28.	23 June 2001	Eastbourne International, UK	Grass	(United States) Lisa Raymond	(Zimbabwe) Cara Black (Russia) Elena Likhovtseva	6–2, 6–2
Win	29.	8 July 2001	Wimbledon, UK	Grass	(United States) Lisa Raymond	(Belgium) Kim Clijsters (Japan) Ai Sugiyama	6–4, 6–3
Win	30.	9 September 2001	US Open	Hard	(United States) Lisa Raymond	(United States) Kimberly Po (France) Nathalie Tauziat	6–2, 5–7, 7–5
Win	31.	4 November 2001	WTA Championships, Munich	Carpet	(United States) Lisa Raymond	(Zimbabwe) Cara Black (Russia) Elena Likhovtseva	7–5, 3–6, 6–3
Win	32.	13 January 2002	Sydney International, Australia	Hard	(United States) Lisa Raymond	(Switzerland) Martina Hingis (Russia) Anna Kournikova	w/o
Win	33.	3 February 2002	Pan Pacific Open, Japan	Carpet	(United States) Lisa Raymond	(Belgium) Els Callens (Italy) Roberta Vinci	6–1, 6–1
Win	34.	3 March 2002	Scottsdale Classic, U.S.	Hard	(United States) Lisa Raymond	(Zimbabwe) Cara Black (Russia) Elena Likhovtseva	6–3, 5–7, 7–6^{(4)}
Win	35.	16 March 2002	Indian Wells Masters, U.S.	Hard	(United States) Lisa Raymond	(Russia) Elena Dementieva (Slovakia) Janette Husárová	7–5, 6–0
Win	36.	1 April 2002	Miami Open, U.S.	Hard	(United States) Lisa Raymond	(Spain) Virginia Ruano Pascual (Argentina) Paola Suárez	7–6^{(4)}, 6–7^{(4)}, 6–3
Win	37.	21 April 2002	Family Circle Cup, U.S.	Clay	(United States) Lisa Raymond	(France) Alexandra Fusai (Netherlands) Caroline Vis	6–4, 3–6, 7–6^{(4)}
Loss	20.	9 June 2002	French Open	Clay	(United States) Lisa Raymond	(Spain) Virginia Ruano Pascual (Argentina) Paola Suárez	6–4, 6–2
Win	38.	22 June 2002	Eastbourne International, UK	Grass	(United States) Lisa Raymond	(Zimbabwe) Cara Black (Russia) Elena Likhovtseva	6–7^{(5)}, 7–6^{(6)}, 6–2
Win	39.	28 July 2002	Stanford Classic, U.S.	Hard	(United States) Lisa Raymond	(Slovakia) Janette Husárová (Spain) Conchita Martínez	6–1, 6–1
Loss	21.	12 January 2003	Sydney International, Australia	Hard	(Spain) Conchita Martínez	(Belgium) Kim Clijsters (Japan) Ai Sugiyama	6–3, 6–3
Win	40.	2 February 2003	Pan Pacific Open, Japan	Carpet	(Russia) Elena Bovina	(United States) Lisa Raymond (United States) Lindsay Davenport	6–3, 6–4
Win	41.	10 August 2003	LA Championships, U.S.	Hard	(France) Mary Pierce	(Russia) Elena Bovina (Belgium) Els Callens	6–3, 6–3
Win	42.	12 October 2003	Porsche Tennis Grand Prix, Germany	Hard (i)	(United States) Lisa Raymond	(Zimbabwe) Cara Black (United States) Martina Navratilova	6–2, 6–4
Loss	22.	2 November 2003	Championships of Philadelphia, U.S.	Hard (i)	(Zimbabwe) Cara Black	(United States) Lisa Raymond (United States) Martina Navratilova	6–3, 6–4
Win	43.	12 January 2004	Sydney International, Australia	Hard	(Zimbabwe) Cara Black	(Russia) Dinara Safina (United States) Meghann Shaughnessy	7–5, 3–6, 6–4
Win	44.	3 February 2004	Pan Pacific Open, Japan	Carpet (i)	(Zimbabwe) Cara Black	(Russia) Elena Likhovtseva (Bulgaria) Magdalena Maleeva	6–0, 6–1
Loss	23.	22 May 2004	Austrian Open	Clay	(Zimbabwe) Cara Black	(United States) Lisa Raymond (United States) Martina Navratilova	6–2, 7–5
Win	45.	21 June 2004	Wimbledon, UK	Grass	(Zimbabwe) Cara Black	(South Africa) Liezel Huber (Japan) Ai Sugiyama	6–3, 7–6^{(5)}
Win	46.	26 July 2004	San Diego Classic, U.S.	Hard	(Zimbabwe) Cara Black	(Spain) Virginia Ruano Pascual (Argentina) Paola Suárez	4–6, 6–1, 6–4
Win	47.	4 October 2004	Porsche Tennis Grand Prix, Germany	Hard (i)	(Zimbabwe) Cara Black	(Germany) Anna-Lena Grönefeld (Germany) Julia Schruff	6–3, 6–2
Win	48.	18 October 2004	Zürich Open, Switzerland	Hard (i)	(Zimbabwe) Cara Black	(Spain) Virginia Ruano Pascual (Argentina) Paola Suárez	6–4, 6–4
Loss	24.	8 November 2004	WTA Championships, Los Angeles	Hard (i)	(Zimbabwe) Cara Black	(Russia) Nadia Petrova (United States) Meghann Shaughnessy	7–5, 6–2
Loss	25.	2 April 2005	Miami Open, U.S.	Hard	(United States) Lisa Raymond	(Russia) Svetlana Kuznetsova (Australia) Alicia Molik	7–5, 6–7^{(5)}, 6–2
Win	49.	18 June 2005	Eastbourne International, UK	Grass	(United States) Lisa Raymond	(Russia) Elena Likhovtseva (Russia) Vera Zvonareva	6–3, 7–5
Win	50.	25 July 2005	[Stanford Classic, U.S.	Hard	(Zimbabwe) Cara Black	(Russia) Elena Likhovtseva (Russia) Vera Zvonareva	6–3, 7–5
Loss	26.	2 October 2005	Luxembourg Open	Hard (i)	(Zimbabwe) Cara Black	(Australia) Samantha Stosur (United States) Lisa Raymond	7–5, 6–1
Loss	27.	16 October 2005	Kremlin Cup	Carpet (i)	(Zimbabwe) Cara Black	(Australia) Samantha Stosur (United States) Lisa Raymond	6–2, 6–4
Win	51.	25 October 2005	Zürich Open	Hard (i)	(Zimbabwe) Cara Black	(Slovakia) Daniela Hantuchová (Japan) Ai Sugiyama	6–7^{(6)}, 7–6^{(4)}, 6–3
Win	52.	31 October 2005	Championships of Philadelphia, U.S.	Hard (i)	(Zimbabwe) Cara Black	(United States) Lisa Raymond (Australia) Samantha Stosur	6–4, 7–6^{(4)}
Loss	28.	13 November 2005	WTA Tour Championships, Los Angeles	Hard (i)	(Zimbabwe) Cara Black	(Australia) Samantha Stosur (United States) Lisa Raymond	6–7^{(5)}, 7–5, 6–4
Loss	29.	7 January 2006	Australian Women's Hardcourts	Hard	(Zimbabwe) Cara Black	(Russia) Dinara Safina (United States) Meghann Shaughnessy	6–2, 6–3
Win	53.	17 January 2006	Sydney International, Australia	Hard	(United States) Corina Morariu	(Argentina) Paola Suárez (Spain) Virginia Ruano Pascual	6–3, 5–7, 6–2
Loss	30.	5 February 2006	Pan Pacific Open, Japan	Carpet (i)	(Zimbabwe) Cara Black	(Australia) Samantha Stosur (United States) Lisa Raymond	6–2, 6–1
Loss	31.	12 February 2006	Paris Indoor, France	Carpet (i)	(Zimbabwe) Cara Black	(France) Émilie Loit (Czech Republic) Květa Peschke	7–6^{(5)}, 6–4
Win	54.	31 July 2006	San Diego Classic, U.S.	Hard	(Zimbabwe) Cara Black	(Germany) Anna-Lena Grönefeld (United States) Meghann Shaughnessy	6–2, 6–2
Loss	32.	8 October 2006	Porsche Tennis Grand Prix	Hard (i)	(Zimbabwe) Cara Black	(United States) Lisa Raymond (Australia) Samantha Stosur	6–3, 6–4
Win	55.	22 October 2006	Zürich Open, Switzerland	Hard (i)	(Zimbabwe) Cara Black	(South Africa) Liezel Huber (Slovenia) Katarina Srebotnik	7–5, 7–5
Loss	33.	12 November 2006	WTA Championships, Madrid	Hard (i)	(Zimbabwe) Cara Black	(United States) Lisa Raymond (Australia) Samantha Stosur	3–6, 6–3, 6–3
Loss	34.	4 February 2007	Pan Pacific Open, Japan	Carpet	(United States) Vania King	(United States) Lisa Raymond (Australia) Samantha Stosur	7–6^{(6)}, 3–6, 7–5
Loss	35.	23 June 2007	Eastbourne International, UK	Grass	(Czech Republic) Květa Peschke	(United States) Lisa Raymond (Australia) Samantha Stosur	6–7^{(5)}, 6–4, 6–3
Win	56.	19 August 2007	Los Angeles Classic, U.S.	Hard	(Czech Republic) Květa Peschke	(Australia) Alicia Molik (Italy) Mara Santangelo	6–0, 6–1
Win	57.	14 October 2007	Porsche Tennis Grand Prix	Hard (i)	(Czech Republic) Květa Peschke	(Chinese Taipei) Chan Yung-jan (Russia) Dinara Safina	6–7^{(5)}, 7–6^{(4)}, [10–2]
Win	58.	21 October 2007	Zürich Open, Switzerland	Carpet (i)	(Czech Republic) Květa Peschke	(United States) Lisa Raymond (Italy) Francesca Schiavone	7–5, 7–6^{(1)}
Win	59.	24 February 2008	Qatar Open	Hard	(Czech Republic) Květa Peschke	(Zimbabwe) Cara Black (United States) Liezel Huber	6–1, 5–7, [10–7]
Loss	36.	21 June 2008	Eastbourne International, UK	Grass	(Czech Republic) Květa Peschke	(Zimbabwe) Cara Black (United States) Liezel Huber	2–6, 6–0, [10–8]
Loss	37.	5 October 2008	Porsche Tennis Grand Prix	Hard (i)	(Czech Republic) Květa Peschke	(Switzerland) Patty Schnyder (Germany) Anna-Lena Grönefeld	6–2, 6–4
Loss	38.	11 November 2008	WTA Tour Championships, Doha	Hard	(Czech Republic) Květa Peschke	(Zimbabwe) Cara Black (United States) Liezel Huber	6–1, 7–5
Loss	39.	20 June 2009	Eastbourne International, UK	Grass	(Australia) Samantha Stosur	(Japan) Ai Sugiyama (Uzbekistan) Akgul Amanmuradova	6–4, 6–3
Loss	40.	4 July 2009	Wimbledon, UK	Grass	(Australia) Samantha Stosur	(United States) Serena Williams (United States) Venus Williams	7–6^{(4)}, 6–4
Loss	41.	23 August 2009	Canadian Open	Hard	(Australia) Samantha Stosur	(Spain) Nuria Llagostera Vives (Spain) María José Martínez Sánchez	2–6, 7–5, [11–9]
Win	60.	19 June 2010	Eastbourne International, UK	Grass	(United States) Lisa Raymond	(Czech Republic) Květa Peschke (Slovenia) Katarina Srebotnik	6–2, 2–6, [13–11]
Loss	42.	8 August 2010	San Diego Open, U.S.	Hard	(United States) Lisa Raymond	(Russia) Maria Kirilenko (China) Zheng Jie	6–4, 6–4
Loss	43.	15 August 2010	Cincinnati Masters, U.S.	Hard	(United States) Lisa Raymond	(Belarus) Victoria Azarenka (Russia) Maria Kirilenko	7–6^{(4)}, 7–6^{(8)}

== ITF Circuit finals ==
=== Singles: 3 (2–1) ===
$100,000 tournaments
$75,000 tournaments
$50,000 tournaments
$25,000 tournaments
$10,000 tournaments

Result	No.	Date	Tournament	Surface	Opponent	Score
Loss	1.	26 November 1989	ITF Bulleen, Australia	Hard	(Germany) Anke Huber	4–6, 1–6
Win	2.	19 November 1990	ITF Perth, Australia	Grass	(Australia) Kristin Godridge	6–1, 6–1
Win	3.	1 December 1991	ITF Mildura, Australia	Hard	(Australia) Michelle Jaggard-Lai	6–4, 1–6, 7–6

=== Doubles: 16 (10–6) ===
Result	No.	Date	Tournament	Surface	Partner	Opponents	Score
Loss	1.	6 March 1988	ITF Newcastle, Australia	Grass	(Australia) Kate McDonald	(Australia) Rachel McQuillan (Australia) Jo-Anne Faull	1–6, 3–6
Loss	2.	6 March 1988	ITF Canberra, Australia	Grass	(Australia) Rachel McQuillan	(Australia) Lisa O'Neill (Australia) Janine Thompson	3–6, 5–7
Win	3.	27 March 1988	ITF Melbourne, Australia	Hard	(Australia) Rachel McQuillan	(Australia) Kristin Godridge (Australia) Kate McDonald	6–4, 7–5
Win	4.	26 September 1988	ITF Bol, Yugoslavia	Clay	(Australia) Kate McDonald	(Czech Republic) Magdalena Šimková (Czech Republic) Eva Švíglerová	6–3, 6–1
Win	5.	9 October 1988	ITF Mali Lošinj, Croatia	Clay	(Australia) Kate McDonald	(Poland) Sylwia Czopek (Poland) Magdalena Feistel	6–3, 1–6, 6–2
Win	6.	16 October 1988	ITF Rabac, Croatia	Clay	(Australia) Kate McDonald	(Czech Republic) Alice Noháčová (Czech Republic) Andrea Strnadová	6–0, 6–4
Win	7.	30 October 1988	ITF Baden, Switzerland	Hard (i)	(Australia) Kate McDonald	(Poland) Katarzyna Nowak (Finland) Petra Thorén	6–2, 6–0
Win	8.	6 November 1988	ITF Lengnau, Switzerland	Carpet (i)	(Australia) Kate McDonald	(Czech Republic) Karin Baleková (Czech Republic) Andrea Strnadová	6–4, 2–6, 6–0
Loss	9.	19 February 1989	ITF Adelaide, Australia	Hard	(Australia) Kate McDonald	(Australia) Kristin Godridge (Australia) Janine Thompson	7–5, 2–6, 2–6
Loss	10.	26 February 1989	ITF Melbourne, Australia	Hard	(Australia) Kate McDonald	(Australia) Sally McCann (Australia) Janine Thompson	3–6, 2–6
Loss	11.	5 March 1989	ITF Canberra, Australia	Hard	(Australia) Kate McDonald	(Hong Kong) Paulette Moreno (Japan) Shiho Okada	4–6, 2–6
Win	12.	6 March 1989	ITF Newcastle, Australia	Grass	(Australia) Kate McDonald	(Australia) Sally McCann (Australia) Janine Thompson	7–6^{(5)}, 4–6, 6–3
Loss	13.	19 June 1989	ITF Brindisi, Italy	Clay	(Finland) Nanne Dahlman	(Argentina) Florencia Labat (United States) Erika deLone	3–6, 6–7
Win	14.	6 March 1988	ITF Cava Tirr, Italy	Clay	(Australia) Kate McDonald	(United States) Anne Grousbeck (Netherlands) Titia Wilmink	2–6, 6–1, 6–1
Win	15.	26 November 1990	ITF Perth, Australia	Grass	(Australia) Jo-Anne Faull	(Australia) Kristin Godridge (Australia) Kirrily Sharpe	6–2, 6–4
Win	16.	24 November 1991	ITF Nuriootpa, Australia	Hard	(Australia) Jo-Anne Faull	(Mexico) Lupita Novelo (United States) Terri O'Reilly	6–4, 7–5

== Grand Slam tournament performance timelines ==
Key
W	F	SF	QF	#R	RR	Q#	DNQ	A	NH

(W) winner; (F) finalist; (SF) semifinalist; (QF) quarterfinalist; (#R) rounds 4, 3, 2, 1; (RR) round-robin stage; (Q#) qualification round; (DNQ) did not qualify; (A) absent; (NH) not held; (SR) strike rate (events won / competed); (W–L) win–loss record.

=== Doubles ===
Tournament	1989	1990	1991	1992	1993	1994	1995	1996	1997	1998	1999	2000	2001	2002	2003	2004	2005	2006	2007	2008	2009	2010	2011	W–L
Australian Open	1R	2R	1R	A	QF	A	3R	2R	A	SF	SF	W	1R	SF	QF	1R	2R	QF	1R	QF	3R	SF	1R	41–19
French Open	A	1R	1R	3R	QF	3R	3R	3R	A	1R	1R	3R	SF	F	1R	3R	QF	QF	3R	3R	3R	3R	3R	39–21
Wimbledon	A	1R	2R	QF	QF	3R	3R	3R	A	SF	3R	SF	W	QF	1R	W	1R	SF	QF	3R	F	QF	1R	54–19
US Open	A	2R	1R	QF	QF	A	F	2R	3R	SF	3R	QF	W	3R	QF	3R	QF	QF	SF	1R	SF	QF	1R	54–20
Win–loss	0–1	2–4	1–4	10–3	12–4	4–2	12–4	6–4	2–1	15–3	9–4	18–4	19–4	17–4	8–4	11–4	9–4	17–4	11–4	9–4	13–4	12–4	2–4	188–79

=== Mixed doubles ===
Tournament	1990	1991	1992	1993	1994	1995	1996	1997	1998	1999	2000	2001	2002	2003	2004	2005	2006	2007	2008	2009	2010	2011	W–L
Australian Open	A	A	1R	1R	QF	2R	1R	A	1R	1R	W	SF	1R	SF	1R	QF	QF	2R	1R	1R	1R	2R	20–18
French Open	1R	1R	3R	3R	2R	3R	1R	A	2R	A	F	QF	1R	1R	2R	2R	QF	1R	1R	1R	1R	QF	15–20
Wimbledon	A	QF	3R	3R	A	1R	2R	A	1R	A	2R	2R	3R	1R	QF	2R	3R	2R	2R	3R	SF	1R	19–18
US Open	A	A	A	1R	1R	1R	QF	1R	SF	SF	SF	W	1R	2R	SF	QF	1R	1R	QF	QF	1R	A	26–17

== Personal life ==
In a 2006 newspaper interview, Stubbs identified herself as a lesbian.

Stubbs follows various sports and publicly supports the development of women’s sports.
