= 2001 US Open – Men's singles =

Men's singles
- 2001 US Open

Final
- Champion: (Australia) Lleyton Hewitt
- Runner-up: (United States) Pete Sampras
- Score: 7–6^{(7–4)}, 6–1, 6–1
- Date: September 9, 2001

Details
- Draw: 128
- Seeds: 32

Events
Singles	men	women		boys	girls
Doubles	men	women	mixed	boys	girls
WC Singles	men	women	quad
WC Doubles	men	women	quad
Legends	men	women	mixed
- US Open

Lleyton Hewitt defeated Pete Sampras in the final, 7–6^{(7–4)}, 6–1, 6–1 to win the men's singles tennis title at the 2001 US Open. It was his first major singles title. Hewitt was the first millennial male player to win a major title.

Marat Safin was the defending champion, but lost in the semifinals to Sampras in a rematch of the previous year's final.

This was the last major appearance of former world No. 1 and two-time US Open champion Pat Rafter; he lost in the fourth round to Sampras. This was also the last major appearance of two-time French Open champion and former world No. 3 Sergi Bruguera; he lost in the first round to Christophe Rochus. This was the first major main draw appearance of future Tour Finals champion David Nalbandian.

The high-profile quarterfinal match between Sampras and Andre Agassi saw Sampras and Agassi hold serve in every one of their 24 service games each. The match had no breaks of serve, and ended with Sampras winning 6–7^{(7–9)}, 7–6^{(7–2)}, 7–6^{(7–2)}, 7–6^{(7–5)}.

This was the first time the US Open used 32 seeds instead of 16, in order to better spread out the higher ranked players.

== Seeds ==
The seeded players are listed below. Lleyton Hewitt is the champion; others show the round in which they were eliminated.

1. (Brazil) Gustavo Kuerten (quarterfinals)
2. (United States) Andre Agassi (quarterfinals)
3. (Russia) Marat Safin (semifinals)
4. (Australia) Lleyton Hewitt (champion)
5. (Spain) Juan Carlos Ferrero (third round)
6. (Australia) Pat Rafter (fourth round)
7. (Russia) Yevgeny Kafelnikov (semifinals)
8. (France) Sébastien Grosjean (first round)
9. (United Kingdom) Tim Henman (third round)
10. (United States) Pete Sampras (finalist)
11. (Spain) Àlex Corretja (third round)
12. (France) Arnaud Clément (fourth round)
13. (Switzerland) Roger Federer (fourth round)
14. (Sweden) Thomas Johansson (fourth round)
15. (Croatia) Goran Ivanišević (third round)
16. (Germany) Tommy Haas (fourth round)
17. (Spain) Carlos Moyá (third round)
18. (United States) Andy Roddick (quarterfinals)
19. (Sweden) Thomas Enqvist (first round)
20. (United States) Jan-Michael Gambill (second round)
21. (France) Fabrice Santoro (second round)
22. (Romania) Andrei Pavel (second round)
23. (Slovakia) Dominik Hrbatý (second round)
24. (Netherlands) Sjeng Schalken (third round)
25. (Spain) Albert Portas (third round)
26. (Ecuador) Nicolás Lapentti (third round)
27. (Argentina) Guillermo Cañas (second round)
28. (Morocco) Hicham Arazi (third round)
29. (Germany) Nicolas Kiefer (first round)
30. (United Kingdom) Greg Rusedski (third round)
31. (France) Nicolas Escudé (second round)
32. (United States) Todd Martin (second round)

== Draw ==
Key

- Q = Qualifier
- WC = Wild card
- LL = Lucky loser
- Alt = Alternate
- ITF = ITF entry
- PR = Protected ranking
- SR = Special ranking
- SE = Special exempt
- JE = Junior exempt
- JR = Junior Accelerator Programme entrant
- CO = College Accelerator Programme entrant
- NG = Next Gen Accelerator Program entrant
- w/o = Walkover
- r = Retired
- d = Defaulted

=== Finals ===
Quarterfinals
1	(Brazil) Gustavo Kuerten	4	0	3
7	(Russia) Yevgeny Kafelnikov	6	6	6
4	(Australia) Lleyton Hewitt	6^{5}	6	6	3	6
18	(United States) Andy Roddick	7^{7}	3	4	6	4
(Argentina) Mariano Zabaleta	4	4	2
3	(Russia) Marat Safin	6	6	6
10	(United States) Pete Sampras	6^{7}	7^{7}	7^{7}	7^{7}
2	(United States) Andre Agassi	7^{9}	6^{2}	6^{2}	6^{5}

Semifinals
7	(Russia) Yevgeny Kafelnikov	1	2	1
4	(Australia) Lleyton Hewitt	6	6	6
3	(Russia) Marat Safin	3	6^{5}	3
10	(United States) Pete Sampras	6	7^{7}	6

Final
4	(Australia) Lleyton Hewitt	7^{7}	6	6
10	(United States) Pete Sampras	6^{4}	1	1

=== Top half ===
==== Section 1 ====
First round
1	(Brazil) G Kuerten	6	6	3	7
PR	(Czech Republic) D Vacek	4	4	6	5
(Spain) A Martín	6	3	2	5
(Denmark) K Pless	3	6	6	7
(Belarus) M Mirnyi	7^{8}	6	7^{7}
(Argentina) G Gaudio	6^{6}	3	6^{4}
(Australia) W Arthurs	1	3	7^{9}	2
27	(Argentina) G Cañas	6	6	6^{7}	6
23	(Slovakia) D Hrbatý	6	2	6	6
(Spain) Á Calatrava	2	6	2	3
WC	(United States) L Harper-Griffith	3	3	3
(Spain) A Costa	6	6	6
Q	(United States) J Gimelstob	6	6	4	4	6
(Czech Republic) M Tabara	4	3	6	6	2
WC	(United States) H Armando	4	4	3
15	(Croatia) G Ivanišević	6	6	6

Second round
1	(Brazil) G Kuerten	6	6	6
(Denmark) K Pless	3	4	4
(Belarus) M Mirnyi	6	3	7	6
27	(Argentina) G Cañas	3	6	5	3
23	(Slovakia) D Hrbatý	4	4	6^{5}
(Spain) A Costa	6	6	7^{7}
Q	(United States) J Gimelstob	3	3	3
15	(Croatia) G Ivanišević	6	6	6

Third round
1	(Brazil) G Kuerten	6^{5}	5	7^{7}	7^{7}	6
(Belarus) M Mirnyi	7^{7}	7	6^{4}	6^{3}	2
(Spain) A Costa	6	7^{7}	7^{7}
15	(Croatia) G Ivanišević	4	6^{4}	6^{2}

Fourth round
1	(Brazil) G Kuerten	6	6	7^{9}
(Spain) A Costa	4	4	6^{7}

==== Section 2 ====
First round
12	(France) A Clément	6	4	6	6
(Spain) G Blanco	2	6	3	4
(Czech Republic) J Vaněk	6^{5}	6	0	4
(Netherlands) J Siemerink	7^{7}	4	6	6
(Sweden) A Vinciguerra	6^{8}	3	6^{6}
(Spain) F Vicente	7^{10}	6	7^{8}
WC	(United States) M Fish	3	6^{3}	3
17	(Spain) C Moyá	6	7^{7}	6
31	(France) N Escudé	6	6	6
(South Korea) H-t Lee	2	1	2
WC	(United States) A Bogomolov Jr.	1	6	4	4
Q	(Argentina) D Nalbandian	6	3	6	6
(Germany) D Prinosil	4	2	4
Q	(Switzerland) G Bastl	6	6	6
(Switzerland) M Kratochvil	6	1	7	4	4
7	(Russia) Y Kafelnikov	1	6	5	6	6

Second round
12	(France) A Clément	6^{4}	6	7^{7}	6
(Netherlands) J Siemerink	7^{7}	4	6^{1}	1
(Spain) F Vicente	6	5	1	3
17	(Spain) C Moyá	3	7	6	6
31	(France) N Escudé	6	3	6	3	5
Q	(Argentina) D Nalbandian	4	6	4	6	7
Q	(Switzerland) G Bastl	6	7	1	4	3
7	(Russia) Y Kafelnikov	2	5	6	6	6

Third round
12	(France) A Clément	6^{3}	6	6	6
17	(Spain) C Moyá	7^{7}	4	4	0
Q	(Argentina) D Nalbandian	6	4	2	2
7	(Russia) Y Kafelnikov	3	6	6	6

Fourth round
12	(France) A Clément	3	4	3
7	(Russia) Y Kafelnikov	6	6	6

==== Section 3 ====
First round
4	(Australia) L Hewitt	6	6	7
(Sweden) M Gustafsson	3	2	5
(Spain) D Sánchez	3	4	2
WC	(United States) J Blake	6	6	6
(Russia) A Stoliarov	6	7^{7}	7
(Switzerland) M Rosset	2	6^{5}	5
Q	(Italy) C Caratti	1	4	6^{4}
25	(Spain) A Portas	6	6	7^{7}
19	(Sweden) T Enqvist	3	6	3	4
Q	(Germany) B Phau	6	4	6	6
(Czech Republic) J Novák	6	6	6
Q	(Switzerland) I Heuberger	2	3	4
(Spain) F Mantilla	6	6	6
(Argentina) J Acasuso	3	3	4
Q	(Netherlands) J van Lottum	2	2	6^{5}
16	(Germany) T Haas	6	6	7^{7}

Second round
4	(Australia) L Hewitt	6	3	2	6	6
WC	(United States) J Blake	4	6	6	3	0
(Russia) A Stoliarov	2	6^{6}	3
25	(Spain) A Portas	6	7^{8}	6
Q	(Germany) B Phau	1	1	2
(Czech Republic) J Novák	6	6	6
(Spain) F Mantilla	1	0	7^{7}	3
16	(Germany) T Haas	6	6	6^{5}	6

Third round
4	(Australia) L Hewitt	6	6	6
25	(Spain) A Portas	1	3	4
(Czech Republic) J Novák	3	4	2
16	(Germany) T Haas	6	6	6

Fourth round
4	(Australia) L Hewitt	3	7^{7}	6	6
16	(Germany) T Haas	6	6^{2}	4	2

==== Section 4 ====
First round
11	(Spain) À Corretja	7^{7}	6^{4}	6	6
(Netherlands) R Sluiter	6^{4}	7^{7}	4	2
(France) J Golmard	7	3	6	6
Q	(France) C Saulnier	5	6	3	4
(Italy) G Pozzi	3	4	6	6	6^{6}
Q	(United States) J Brasington	6	6	2	3	7^{8}
(Czech Republic) S Doseděl	4	1	2
18	(United States) A Roddick	6	6	6
32	(United States) T Martin	6	6	7
(United States) M Russell	4	4	5
(Spain) T Robredo	7^{7}	6	7^{10}
(Belgium) O Rochus	6^{4}	2	6^{8}
(South Africa) W Ferreira	6	3	6^{5}	6	4
(Belarus) V Voltchkov	4	6	7^{7}	1	6
(France) A Di Pasquale	6	3	6	6^{2}	0
5	(Spain) JC Ferrero	1	6	2	7^{7}	6

Second round
11	(Spain) À Corretja	7	7^{7}	7
(France) J Golmard	5	6^{4}	5
Q	(United States) J Brasington	2	1	7	6^{4}
18	(United States) A Roddick	6	6	5	7^{7}
32	(United States) T Martin	3	5	6	3
(Spain) T Robredo	6	7	3	6
(Belarus) V Voltchkov	6^{2}	1	4
5	(Spain) JC Ferrero	7^{7}	6	6

Third round
11	(Spain) À Corretja	4	2	2
18	(United States) A Roddick	6	6	6
(Spain) T Robredo	7^{7}	4	6	4	7^{7}
5	(Spain) JC Ferrero	6^{5}	6	4	6	6^{1}

Fourth round
18	(United States) A Roddick	6	6	6
(Spain) T Robredo	2	2	4

=== Bottom half ===
==== Section 5 ====
First round
8	(France) S Grosjean	4	3	4
(Argentina) M Zabaleta	6	6	6
(Morocco) K Alami	3	4	4
WC	(United States) T Dent	6	6	6
(Sweden) J Björkman	7^{7}	6	6
(Spain) J Balcells	6^{3}	2	2
(Morocco) Y El Aynaoui	7^{7}	5	4	3
30	(United Kingdom) G Rusedski	6^{4}	7	6	6
21	(France) F Santoro	7	6	6^{6}	7^{8}
PR	(Sweden) M Larsson	5	4	7^{8}	6^{6}
PR	(Denmark) K Carlsen	1	6	6	1^{r}
(Belgium) X Malisse	6	4	3	2
(Brazil) F Meligeni	2	6	6	6
(Russia) N Davydenko	6	2	3	4
Q	(Czech Republic) J Vacek	3	2	7^{7}	6	3
9	(United Kingdom) T Henman	6	6	6^{5}	3	6

Second round
(Argentina) M Zabaleta	6	6	6
WC	(United States) T Dent	3	3	4
(Sweden) J Björkman	5	5	7^{10}	6^{6}
30	(United Kingdom) G Rusedski	7	7	6^{8}	7^{8}
21	(France) F Santoro	0	6	3	2
(Belgium) X Malisse	6	3	6	6
(Brazil) F Meligeni	3	4	6	4
9	(United Kingdom) T Henman	6	6	3	6

Third round
(Argentina) M Zabaleta	6^{5}	6	7	7^{7}
30	(United Kingdom) G Rusedski	7^{7}	4	5	6^{2}
(Belgium) X Malisse	6^{6}	6	7	4	6
9	(United Kingdom) T Henman	7^{8}	3	5	6	4

Fourth round
(Argentina) M Zabaleta	6	7^{7}	7
(Belgium) X Malisse	4	6^{4}	5

==== Section 6 ====
First round
14	(Sweden) T Johansson	6	6	6
(Spain) G Puentes	1	2	2
(Brazil) A Simoni	4	6^{3}	6^{4}
(Italy) A Gaudenzi	6	7^{7}	7^{7}
(Austria) M Hipfl	6	5	2	0
(Chile) M Ríos	3	7	6	6
Q	(Philippines) E Taino	4	7	2	2
22	(Romania) A Pavel	6	5	6	6
28	(Morocco) H Arazi	6	6	4	5	6
(Argentina) A Calleri	3	3	6	7	3
(United States) C Woodruff	6	6	3	6
(France) A Dupuis	1	3	6	1
(Croatia) I Ljubičić	7^{9}	6	6
(Czech Republic) M Damm	6^{7}	3	4
Q	(France) S de Chaunac	4	2	2
3	(Russia) M Safin	6	6	6

Second round
14	(Sweden) T Johansson	4	6	6	6
(Italy) A Gaudenzi	6	2	3	3
(Chile) M Ríos	7	6	6
22	(Romania) A Pavel	5	4	0
28	(Morocco) H Arazi	6	7^{7}	7
(United States) C Woodruff	4	6^{1}	5
(Croatia) I Ljubičić	6^{5}	7^{7}	6^{5}	6^{5}
3	(Russia) M Safin	7^{7}	6^{2}	7^{7}	7^{7}

Third round
14	(Sweden) T Johansson	6	2	6	6
(Chile) M Ríos	4	6	3	2
28	(Morocco) H Arazi	5	4	6^{5}
3	(Russia) M Safin	7	6	7^{7}

Fourth round
14	(Sweden) T Johansson	2	6	4	6^{3}
3	(Russia) M Safin	6	2	6	7^{7}

==== Section 7 ====
First round
6	(Australia) P Rafter	7^{7}	6	7
WC	(United States) B Bryan	6^{3}	3	5
(Belgium) C Rochus	3	6	6	6
(Spain) S Bruguera	6	4	3	4
Q	(Thailand) P Srichaphan	4	4	1
(Italy) D Sanguinetti	6	6	6
(United States) M Chang	2	4	4
26	(Ecuador) N Lapentti	6	6	6
20	(United States) J-M Gambill	6	6	6
(France) C Pioline	2	2	4
(Russia) M Youzhny	6^{5}	6	6	6
(Czech Republic) B Ulihrach	7^{7}	2	3	3
(Netherlands) E Kempes	2	6	2	5
Q	(Brazil) A Sá	6	4	6	7
(France) J Boutter	4	6^{4}	6^{6}
10	(United States) P Sampras	6	7^{7}	7^{8}

Second round
6	(Australia) P Rafter	7	6	6
(Belgium) C Rochus	5	2	1
(Italy) D Sanguinetti	4	5	3
26	(Ecuador) N Lapentti	6	7	6
20	(United States) J-M Gambill	4	1	r
(Russia) M Youzhny	6	4
Q	(Brazil) A Sá	6^{4}	4	3
10	(United States) P Sampras	7^{7}	6	6

Third round
6	(Australia) P Rafter	7^{7}	6	6
26	(Ecuador) N Lapentti	6^{3}	2	2
(Russia) M Youzhny	3	2	2
10	(United States) P Sampras	6	6	6

Fourth round
6	(Australia) P Rafter	3	2	7^{7}	4
10	(United States) P Sampras	6	6	6^{5}	6

==== Section 8 ====
First round
13	(Switzerland) R Federer	6	6	6
(Germany) L Burgsmüller	4	4	4
(Israel) H Levy	3	5	4
WC	(United States) R Ginepri	6	7	6
(Austria) S Koubek	6	3	6	3	3
(Australia) A Ilie	2	6	1	6	6
(United Kingdom) M Lee	6	4	4	6	3
24	(Netherlands) S Schalken	3	6	6	3	6
29	(Germany) N Kiefer	7	4	0	r
(Germany) R Schüttler	5	6	1
Q	(Paraguay) R Delgado	4	6	6	6
(Spain) J Díaz	6	3	4	3
(Chile) N Massú	7^{15}	6	7^{7}
(Spain) F Clavet	6^{13}	3	6^{0}
Q	(United States) M Bryan	4	1	0
2	(United States) A Agassi	6	6	6

Second round
13	(Switzerland) R Federer	6	7	6
WC	(United States) R Ginepri	2	5	1
(Australia) A Ilie	2	6	3	0
24	(Netherlands) S Schalken	6	3	6	6
(Germany) R Schüttler	4	7^{7}	6^{7}	6	2
Q	(Paraguay) R Delgado	6	6^{5}	7^{9}	2	6
(Chile) N Massú	7^{7}	4	2	6^{1}
2	(United States) A Agassi	6^{4}	6	6	7^{7}

Third round
13	(Switzerland) R Federer	6	7	7^{7}
24	(Netherlands) S Schalken	4	5	6^{3}
Q	(Paraguay) R Delgado	5	6^{5}	3
2	(United States) A Agassi	7	7^{7}	6

Fourth round
13	(Switzerland) R Federer	1	2	4
2	(United States) A Agassi	6	6	6

Preceded by 2001 Wimbledon Championships – Men's singles	Grand Slam men's singles	Succeeded by 2002 Australian Open – Men's singles
