= 2005 US Open – Women's doubles =

Women's doubles
- 2005 US Open

Final
- Champion: (United States) Lisa Raymond (Australia) Samantha Stosur
- Runner-up: (Russia) Elena Dementieva (Italy) Flavia Pennetta
- Score: 6–2, 5–7, 6–3

Details
- Draw: 64 (7 WC )
- Seeds: 16

Events
Singles	men	women		boys	girls
Doubles	men	women	mixed	boys	girls
WC Singles	men	women	quad
WC Doubles	men	women	quad
Legends	men	women	mixed
← 2004 ·	US Open	· 2006 →

Lisa Raymond and Samantha Stosur defeated Elena Dementieva and Flavia Pennetta in the final, 6–2, 5–7, 6–3 to win the women's doubles tennis title at the 2005 US Open.

Virginia Ruano Pascual and Paola Suárez were the reigning champions, but Suárez withdrew due to a back injury. Ruano Pascual partnered Conchita Martínez, but lost in the semifinals to Raymond and Stosur.

== Seeds ==
1. (Zimbabwe) Cara Black / (Australia) Rennae Stubbs (quarterfinals)
2. (Russia) Svetlana Kuznetsova / (Australia) Alicia Molik (quarterfinals)
3. (Spain) Conchita Martínez / (Spain) Virginia Ruano Pascual (semifinals)
4. (Russia) Nadia Petrova / (United States) Meghann Shaughnessy (third round)
5. (Slovakia) Daniela Hantuchová / (Japan) Ai Sugiyama (third round)
6. (United States) Lisa Raymond / (Australia) Samantha Stosur (champions)
7. (Germany) Anna-Lena Grönefeld / (United States) Martina Navratilova (semifinals)
8. (United States) Corina Morariu / (Switzerland) Patty Schnyder (quarterfinals)
9. (Spain) Anabel Medina Garrigues / (Russia) Dinara Safina (first round)
10. (Japan) Shinobu Asagoe / (Slovenia) Katarina Srebotnik (third round)
11. (France) Émilie Loit / (Australia) Nicole Pratt (third round)
12. (China) Li Ting / (China) Sun Tiantian (third round)
13. (Czech Republic) Květa Peschke / (Czech Republic) Barbora Strýcová (first round)
14. (Russia) Elena Dementieva / (Italy) Flavia Pennetta (final)
15. (Slovakia) Janette Husárová / (Italy) Francesca Schiavone (first round)
16. (Argentina) Gisela Dulko / (Russia) Maria Kirilenko (third round)

=== Key ===
- Q = Qualifier
- WC = Wild card
- LL = Lucky loser
- Alt = Alternate
- ITF = ITF entry
- PR = Protected ranking
- SR = Special ranking
- SE = Special exempt
- JE = Junior exempt
- JR = Junior Accelerator Programme entrant
- CO = College Accelerator Programme entrant
- NG = Next Gen Accelerator Program entrant
- w/o = Walkover
- r = Retired
- d = Defaulted

== Draw ==
=== Finals ===
Quarter-Finals
1	(Zimbabwe) Cara Black (Australia) Rennae Stubbs	7	4	4
6	(United States) Lisa Raymond (Australia) Samantha Stosur	5	6	6
3	(Spain) Conchita Martínez (Spain) Virginia Ruano Pascual	6	6
(China) Yan Zi (China) Zheng Jie	3	4
8	(United States) Corina Morariu (Switzerland) Patty Schnyder	3	6	3
14	(Russia) Elena Dementieva (Italy) Flavia Pennetta	6	3	6
7	(Germany) Anna-Lena Grönefeld (United States) Martina Navratilova	6^{5}	7	7
2	(Russia) Svetlana Kuznetsova (Australia) Alicia Molik	7	5	5

Semi-Finals
6	(United States) Lisa Raymond (Australia) Samantha Stosur	7	4	7
3	(Spain) Conchita Martínez (Spain) Virginia Ruano Pascual	5	6	6^{2}
14	(Russia) Elena Dementieva (Italy) Flavia Pennetta	6	6
7	(Germany) Anna-Lena Grönefeld (United States) Martina Navratilova	2	4

Final
6	(United States) Lisa Raymond (Australia) Samantha Stosur	6	5	6
14	(Russia) Elena Dementieva (Italy) Flavia Pennetta	2	7	3

=== Top half ===
==== Section one ====
First round
1	(Zimbabwe) C Black (Australia) R Stubbs	6	6
(Australia) L McShea (United States) A Spears	1	3
(United States) L Granville (United States) C Gullickson	3	4
(United States) J Craybas (United States) M Tu	6	6
(Puerto Rico) K Brandi (France) C Dhenin	5	2
(Madagascar) D Randriantefy (Israel) A Smashnova	7	6
(Japan) R Fujiwara (China) N Li	7	6
15	(Slovakia) J Husárová (Italy) F Schiavone	6^{5}	3
10	(Japan) S Asagoe (Slovenia) K Srebotnik	6	6
(United States) J Hopkins (United States) M Washington	0	1
WC	(United States) A Haynes (United States) B Mattek	2	6	4
(Russia) E Likhovtseva (Bulgaria) M Maleeva	6	4	6
(Russia) V Dushevina (Israel) S Pe'er	7	5	6
(France) M Bartoli (Venezuela) M Sequera	5	7	4
(Greece) E Daniilidou (United States) J Russell	2	3
6	(United States) L Raymond (Australia) S Stosur	6	6

Second round
1	(Zimbabwe) C Black (Australia) R Stubbs	6	6
(United States) J Craybas (United States) M Tu	4	3
(Madagascar) D Randriantefy (Israel) A Smashnova	4	5
(Japan) R Fujiwara (China) N Li	6	7
10	(Japan) S Asagoe (Slovenia) K Srebotnik	6	6
(Russia) E Likhovtseva (Bulgaria) M Maleeva	2	4
(Russia) V Dushevina (Israel) S Pe'er	3	2
6	(United States) L Raymond (Australia) S Stosur	6	6

Third round
1	(Zimbabwe) C Black (Australia) R Stubbs	6	7
(Japan) R Fujiwara (China) N Li	4	6^{3}
10	(Japan) S Asagoe (Slovenia) K Srebotnik	1	3
6	(United States) L Raymond (Australia) S Stosur	6	6

Quarterfinals
1	(Zimbabwe) C Black (Australia) R Stubbs	7	4	4
6	(United States) L Raymond (Australia) S Stosur	5	6	6

==== Section two ====
First round
3	(Spain) C Martínez (Spain) V Ruano Pascual	6	7
(Italy) R Grande (Thailand) T Tanasugarn	3	5
(Croatia) J Kostanić (Croatia) S Mamić	7	3	3
(France) S Cohen-Aloro (Tunisia) S Sfar	6^{10}	6	6
(Czech Republic) Z Ondrášková (Slovakia) M Suchá	3	4
(Czech Republic) D Chládková (France) V Razzano	6	6
(Czech Republic) I Benešová (Ukraine) Y Beygelzimer	4	7	1
16	(Argentina) G Dulko (Russia) M Kirilenko	6	6^{3}	6
9	(Spain) A Medina Garrigues (Russia) D Safina	2	3
(China) Z Yan (China) J Zheng	6	6
(Chinese Taipei) C-j Chuang (Japan) A Morigami	6	6
WC	(United States) M Irvin (United States) J Jackson	4	3
(United States) A Frazier (Russia) A Jidkova	7	4	7
(France) S Foretz (Czech Republic) N Vaidišová	5	6	6^{4}
WC	(United States) A Glatch (United States) V King	5	0
5	(Slovakia) D Hantuchová (Japan) A Sugiyama	7	6

Second round
3	(Spain) C Martínez (Spain) V Ruano Pascual	7	6
(France) S Cohen-Aloro (Tunisia) S Sfar	5	2
(Czech Republic) D Chládková (France) V Razzano	2	6	4
16	(Argentina) G Dulko (Russia) M Kirilenko	6	3	6
(China) Z Yan (China) J Zheng	6	6
(Chinese Taipei) C-j Chuang (Japan) A Morigami	3	1
(United States) A Frazier (Russia) A Jidkova	6	3	3
5	(Slovakia) D Hantuchová (Japan) A Sugiyama	2	6	6

Third round
3	(Spain) C Martínez (Spain) V Ruano Pascual	4	6	6
16	(Argentina) G Dulko (Russia) M Kirilenko	6	4	2
(China) Z Yan (China) J Zheng	6	3	7
5	(Slovakia) D Hantuchová (Japan) A Sugiyama	3	6	5

Quarterfinals
3	(Spain) C Martínez (Spain) V Ruano Pascual	6	6
(China) Z Yan (China) J Zheng	3	4

=== Bottom half ===
==== Section three ====
First round
8	(United States) C Morariu (Switzerland) P Schnyder	7	6
(Czech Republic) K Koukalová (Czech Republic) L Šafářová	5	2
WC	(United States) M Bradley (United States) K Miller	6	6
(Colombia) C Castaño (Spain) L Pous Tió	4	2
(Bosnia and Herzegovina) M Jugić-Salkić (Czech Republic) M Paštiková	6	6
WC	(United States) T Ashley (United States) J Kirkland	4	3
(India) S Mirza (Australia) B Stewart	2	4
11	(France) É Loit (Australia) N Pratt	6	6
14	(Russia) E Dementieva (Italy) F Pennetta	6	6
(Russia) A Chakvetadze (France) T Golovin	3	2
(Spain) RM Andrés Rodríguez (Argentina) M Díaz Oliva	1	4
(Spain) M Marrero (Italy) A Serra Zanetti	6	6
(Serbia and Montenegro) J Janković (Slovenia) T Križan	6	5	6
(Latvia) L Dekmeijere (Bulgaria) S Karatantcheva	4	7	3
(Argentina) ME Salerni (Venezuela) M Vento-Kabchi	3	7	5
4	(Russia) N Petrova (United States) M Shaughnessy	6	6^{4}	7

Second round
8	(United States) C Morariu (Switzerland) P Schnyder	6	6
WC	(United States) M Bradley (United States) K Miller	2	3
(Bosnia and Herzegovina) M Jugić-Salkić (Czech Republic) M Paštiková	3	2
11	(France) É Loit (Australia) N Pratt	6	6
14	(Russia) E Dementieva (Italy) F Pennetta	6	6
(Spain) M Marrero (Italy) A Serra Zanetti	3	4
(Serbia and Montenegro) J Janković (Slovenia) T Križan	0	r
4	(Russia) N Petrova (United States) M Shaughnessy	1

Third round
8	(United States) C Morariu (Switzerland) P Schnyder	6	3	6
11	(France) É Loit (Australia) N Pratt	3	6	4
14	(Russia) E Dementieva (Italy) F Pennetta	7	6
4	(Russia) N Petrova (United States) M Shaughnessy	6^{4}	3

Quarterfinals
8	(United States) C Morariu (Switzerland) P Schnyder	3	6	3
14	(Russia) E Dementieva (Italy) F Pennetta	6	3	6

==== Section four ====
First round
7	(Germany) A-L Grönefeld (United States) M Navratilova	6	6
WC	(United States) A Harkleroad (United States) L Lee-Waters	2	2
WC	(United States) A Rolle (United States) N Uberoi	6	2	6
(Belgium) E Callens (Italy) M Santangelo	1	6	4
(Poland) M Domachowska (Croatia) S Talaja	7	4	2
(Chinese Taipei) J Lee (China) S Peng	6^{5}	6	6
(Switzerland) E Gagliardi (Germany) M Weingärtner	6	5	0
12	(China) T Li (China) T Sun	2	7	6
13	(Czech Republic) K Peschke (Czech Republic) B Strýcová	6^{4}	5
(Italy) ME Camerin (Italy) T Garbin	7	7
(Italy) S Farina Elia (Italy) R Vinci	3	7	6
(Japan) N Miyagi (Russia) A Myskina	6	6^{9}	2
(Czech Republic) E Birnerová (Romania) A Vanc	2	6	6
(Spain) L Domínguez Lino (Spain) N Llagostera Vives	6	3	4
(Russia) E Linetskaya (Russia) G Voskoboeva	6^{3}	2
2	(Russia) S Kuznetsova (Australia) A Molik	7	6

Second round
7	(Germany) A-L Grönefeld (United States) M Navratilova	6	6
WC	(United States) A Rolle (United States) N Uberoi	1	0
(Chinese Taipei) J Lee (China) S Peng	3	4
12	(China) T Li (China) T Sun	6	6
(Italy) ME Camerin (Italy) T Garbin	2	0
(Italy) S Farina Elia (Italy) R Vinci	6	6
(Czech Republic) E Birnerová (Romania) A Vanc	2	2
2	(Russia) S Kuznetsova (Australia) A Molik	6	6

Third round
7	(Germany) A-L Grönefeld (United States) M Navratilova	2	7	6
12	(China) T Li (China) T Sun	6	6^{5}	1
(Italy) S Farina Elia (Italy) R Vinci	3	3
2	(Russia) S Kuznetsova (Australia) A Molik	6	6

Quarterfinals
7	(Germany) A-L Grönefeld (United States) M Navratilova	6^{5}	7	7
2	(Russia) S Kuznetsova (Australia) A Molik	7	5	5
