= Kristi Miller =

American tennis player

- Full name: Kristi Miller-North
- Country (sports): United States
- Born: December 22, 1985 (age 40)
- Plays: Right-handed
- Prize money: $17,293

Singles
- Career record: 26–24
- Highest ranking: No. 645 (May 25, 2009)

Doubles
- Career record: 23–16
- Career titles: 3 ITF
- Highest ranking: No. 291 (July 24, 2006)

Grand Slam doubles results
- US Open: 2R (2005)

Kristi Miller-North (born December 22, 1985) is an American former professional tennis player. She was raised in Marysville, Michigan and played collegiate tennis for Georgia Tech.

Miller made history in 2005 as Georgia Tech's first female All-American and was a winner of the 2005–06 Honda Sports Award. In 2006–07, she was a member of Georgia Tech's NCAA championship winning team. They secured the title by beating UCLA in the championship match at home in Athens and contributed with a win over Riza Zalameda in No. 1 singles.

A right-handed player, Miller competed briefly on the professional tour after graduation and won three ITF titles in doubles. Her best performance on tour came while she was still at Georgia Tech in 2005, when she teamed up with Megan Bradley to make the second round of the US Open women's doubles.

== ITF Circuit finals ==
=== Singles: 2 (0–2) ===
Outcome	No.	Date	Tournament	Surface	Opponent	Score
Runner-up	1.	July 24, 2005	ITF Evansville, United States	Hard	(United States) Sarah Taylor	6–7^{(8)} 1–6
Runner-up	2.	October 5, 2008	ITF Les Franqueses del Vallès, Spain	Hard	(Germany) Justine Ozga	6–4, 3–6, 6–7^{(3)}

=== Doubles: 4 (3–1) ===
Outcome	No.	Date	Tournament	Surface	Partner	Opponents	Score
Runner-up	1.	July 19, 2005	ITF Evansville, United States	Hard	(United States) Christian Tara	(Indonesia) Wynne Prakusya (Indonesia) Romana Tedjakusuma	0–6, 1–6
Winner	1.	July 14, 2008	ITF Atlanta, United States	Hard	(United States) Sanaz Marand	(United States) Whitney Jones (United States) Tiya Rolle	6–2, 6–4
Winner	2.	September 14, 2008	ITF Lleida, Spain	Clay	(North Macedonia) Aleksandra Josifoska	(United Kingdom) Natasha Khan (Spain) Lucía Sainz	6–4, 7–5
Winner	3.	October 6, 2008	ITF Barcelona, Spain	Clay	(Spain) Lucía Sainz	(France) Samantha Schoeffel (Netherlands) Bibiane Schoofs	6–7^{(5)}, 7–6^{(6)}, [10–7]
