= 2001 US Open – Women's doubles =

Women's doubles
- 2001 US Open

Final
- Champions: (United States) Lisa Raymond (Australia) Rennae Stubbs
- Runners-up: (United States) Kimberly Po-Messerli (France) Nathalie Tauziat
- Score: 6–2, 5–7, 7–5
- Date: September 9, 2001

Details
- Draw: 64 (4 Q / 5 WC )
- Seeds: 16

Events
Singles	men	women		boys	girls
Doubles	men	women	mixed	boys	girls
WC Singles	men	women	quad
WC Doubles	men	women	quad
Legends	men	women	mixed
- US Open

Julie Halard-Decugis and Ai Sugiyama were the defending champions, but did not compete this year.

Lisa Raymond and Rennae Stubbs won the title, defeating Kimberly Po-Messerli and Nathalie Tauziat 6–2, 5–7, 7–5 in the final. It was the 3rd doubles Grand Slam title and the 6th doubles title of the year for the pair. It was also the 24th doubles title overall for Raymond and the 30th doubles title overall for Stubbs, in their respective careers.

== Seeds ==
1. (United States) Lisa Raymond / (Australia) Rennae Stubbs (champions)
2. (Spain) Virginia Ruano Pascual / (Argentina) Paola Suárez (third round)
3. (Zimbabwe) Cara Black / (Russia) Elena Likhovtseva (semifinal)
4. (United States) Kimberly Po-Messerli / (France) Nathalie Tauziat (final)
5. (withdrew)
6. (United States) Nicole Arendt / (Netherlands) Caroline Vis (first round)
7. (United States) Martina Navratilova / (Spain) Arantxa Sánchez Vicario (quarterfinals)
8. (France) Alexandra Fusai / (Italy) Rita Grande (first round)
9. (United States) Serena Williams / (United States) Venus Williams (third round)
10. (Slovenia) Tina Križan / (Slovenia) Katarina Srebotnik (quarterfinals)
11. (United States) Nicole Pratt / (Ukraine) Elena Tatarkova (first round)
12. (Spain) Conchita Martínez / (Spain) Anabel Medina Garrigues (first round)
13. (Belgium) Justine Henin / (United States) Meghann Shaughnessy (second round)
14. (France) Émilie Loit / (France) Anne-Gaëlle Sidot (first round)
15. (Germany) Anke Huber / (Austria) Barbara Schett (second round)
16. (Spain) Magüi Serna / (Argentina) Patricia Tarabini (second round)

== Draw ==
Key

- Q = Qualifier
- WC = Wild card
- LL = Lucky loser
- Alt = Alternate
- ITF = ITF entry
- PR = Protected ranking
- SR = Special ranking
- SE = Special exempt
- JE = Junior exempt
- JR = Junior Accelerator Programme entrant
- CO = College Accelerator Programme entrant
- NG = Next Gen Accelerator Program entrant
- w/o = Walkover
- r = Retired
- d = Defaulted

=== Finals ===
Quarterfinals
1	(United States) Lisa Raymond (Australia) Rennae Stubbs	7^{11}	6
(United States) Jennifer Capriati (Switzerland) Martina Hingis	6^{9}	4
3	(Zimbabwe) Cara Black (Russia) Elena Likhovtseva	6	6
10	(Slovenia) Tina Križan (Slovenia) Katarina Srebotnik	3	3
(Belgium) Els Callens (United States) Chanda Rubin	3	6^{4}
4	(United States) Kimberly Po-Messerli (France) Nathalie Tauziat	6	7^{7}
7	(United States) Martina Navratilova (Spain) Arantxa Sánchez Vicario	2	6	4
(France) Sandrine Testud (Italy) Roberta Vinci	6	4	6

Semifinals
1	(United States) Lisa Raymond (Australia) Rennae Stubbs	6	6
3	(Zimbabwe) Cara Black (Russia) Elena Likhovtseva	3	4
4	(United States) Kimberly Po-Messerli (France) Nathalie Tauziat	4	7	6
(France) Sandrine Testud (Italy) Roberta Vinci	6	5	0

Final
1	(United States) Lisa Raymond (Australia) Rennae Stubbs	6	5	7
4	(United States) Kimberly Po-Messerli (France) Nathalie Tauziat	2	7	5

=== Top half ===
==== Section 1 ====
First round
1	(United States) L Raymond (Australia) R Stubbs	6	6
Q	(Brazil) J Cortez (Spain) G Riera	1	0
(Sweden) Å Carlsson (Bulgaria) M Maleeva	4	0^{r}
(Hungary) P Mandula (Austria) P Wartusch	6	0
(Indonesia) Y Basuki (Indonesia) W Prakusya	1	6	2
(Canada) S Jeyaseelan (Russia) L Krasnoroutskaya	6	0	6
WC	(United States) A Cargill (United States) L Granville	4	0
13	(Belgium) J Henin (United States) M Shaughnessy	6	6
12	(Spain) C Martínez (Spain) A Medina Garrigues	6	3	2
(United States) A Frazier (United States) K Schlukebir	4	6	6
(United States) J Capriati (Switzerland) M Hingis	6	6
(South Africa) K Grant (United States) L Osterloh	1	3
(Australia) R McQuillan (France) V Razzano	4	4
(Czech Republic) K Hrdličková (Germany) B Rittner	6	6
(France) C Dhenin (Argentina) M Díaz Oliva	6	3	6
LL	(Germany) V Henke (Australia) B Stewart	2	6	3

Second round
1	(United States) L Raymond (Australia) R Stubbs	6	6
(Hungary) P Mandula (Austria) P Wartusch	1	1
(Canada) S Jeyaseelan (Russia) L Krasnoroutskaya	6	6
13	(Belgium) J Henin (United States) M Shaughnessy	4	4
(United States) A Frazier (United States) K Schlukebir	2	2
(United States) J Capriati (Switzerland) M Hingis	6	6
(Czech Republic) K Hrdličková (Germany) B Rittner	6	6^{5}	6
(France) C Dhenin (Argentina) M Díaz Oliva	2	7^{7}	2

Third round
1	(United States) L Raymond (Australia) R Stubbs	6	6
(Canada) S Jeyaseelan (Russia) L Krasnoroutskaya	4	2
(United States) J Capriati (Switzerland) M Hingis	6	6
(Czech Republic) K Hrdličková (Germany) B Rittner	1	2

Quarterfinals
1	(United States) L Raymond (Australia) R Stubbs	7^{11}	6
(United States) J Capriati (Switzerland) M Hingis	6^{9}	4

==== Section 2 ====
First round
3	(Zimbabwe) C Black (Russia) E Likhovtseva	6	6
(Slovenia) M Matevžič (Federal Republic of Yugoslavia) D Zarić	2	0
(France) N Dechy (France) A Mauresmo	4	6	6
(Austria) S Plischke (United Kingdom) J Pullin	6	3	4
Q	(Australia) E Dominikovic (United States) M Irvin	4	6	6
(Japan) R Hiraki (Russia) A Jidkova	6	4	2
(Russia) E Dementieva (Slovakia) J Husárová	6	6
14	(France) É Loit (France) A-G Sidot	2	3
10	(Slovenia) T Križan (Slovenia) K Srebotnik	5	6	6
(United States) E deLone (Australia) A Ellwood	7	3	3
(Federal Republic of Yugoslavia) J Dokic (Russia) N Petrova	6	7^{10}
Q	(United States) D Buth (Netherlands) A van Exel	4	6^{8}
(Japan) S Asagoe (Japan) Y Yoshida	1	4
(Czech Republic) D Bedáňová (Argentina) ME Salerni	6	6
(South Africa) A Coetzer (United States) L McNeil	4	6	6
6	(United States) N Arendt (Netherlands) C Vis	6	3	4

Second round
3	(Zimbabwe) C Black (Russia) E Likhovtseva	6	7
(France) N Dechy (France) A Mauresmo	4	5
Q	(Australia) E Dominikovic (United States) M Irvin
(Russia) E Dementieva (Slovakia) J Husárová	d
10	(Slovenia) T Križan (Slovenia) K Srebotnik	6	0	7^{7}
(Federal Republic of Yugoslavia) J Dokic (Russia) N Petrova	3	6	6^{4}
(Czech Republic) D Bedáňová (Argentina) ME Salerni	6	6
(South Africa) A Coetzer (United States) L McNeil	2	3

Third round
3	(Zimbabwe) C Black (Russia) E Likhovtseva	7^{7}	6
Q	(Australia) E Dominikovic (United States) M Irvin	6^{2}	3
10	(Slovenia) T Križan (Slovenia) K Srebotnik	6	6
(Czech Republic) D Bedáňová (Argentina) ME Salerni	3	0

Quarterfinals
3	(Zimbabwe) C Black (Russia) E Likhovtseva	6	6
10	(Slovenia) T Križan (Slovenia) K Srebotnik	3	3

=== Bottom half ===
==== Section 3 ====
First round
8	(France) A Fusai (Italy) R Grande	2	6	3
(Belgium) E Callens (United States) C Rubin	6	4	6
(Russia) E Bovina (Slovakia) D Hantuchová	6	1	2
(Italy) S Farina Elia (Uzbekistan) I Tulyaganova	3	6	6
WC	(United States) A Bradshaw (United States) J Hopkins	6^{5}	3
(Germany) A Glass (Germany) M Weingärtner	7^{7}	6
(Italy) G Casoni (South Africa) J Kruger	3	0
9	(United States) S Williams (United States) V Williams	6	6
16	(Spain) M Serna (Argentina) P Tarabini	6	6
(Slovakia) K Habšudová (Slovenia) T Pisnik	4	4
(Belgium) L Courtois (Australia) A Molik	2	6	6
(Croatia) I Majoli (Slovakia) H Nagyová	6	3	2
(South Africa) L Huber (Argentina) L Montalvo	6	6
(Denmark) E Dyrberg (Hungary) K Marosi-Aracama	1	2
(South Africa) N de Villiers (Kazakhstan) I Selyutina	3	6	1
4	(United States) K Po-Messerli (France) N Tauziat	6	4	6

Second round
(Belgium) E Callens (United States) C Rubin	7^{7}	6
(Italy) S Farina Elia (Uzbekistan) I Tulyaganova	6^{5}	4
(Germany) A Glass (Germany) M Weingärtner	1	3
9	(United States) S Williams (United States) V Williams	6	6
16	(Spain) M Serna (Argentina) P Tarabini	4	1
(Belgium) L Courtois (Australia) A Molik	6	6
(South Africa) L Huber (Argentina) L Montalvo	4	1
4	(United States) K Po-Messerli (France) N Tauziat	6	6

Third round
(Belgium) E Callens (United States) C Rubin	6	4	7
9	(United States) S Williams (United States) V Williams	2	6	5
(Belgium) L Courtois (Australia) A Molik	3	3
4	(United States) K Po-Messerli (France) N Tauziat	6	6

Quarterfinals
(Belgium) E Callens (United States) C Rubin	3	6^{4}
4	(United States) K Po-Messerli (France) N Tauziat	6	7^{7}

==== Section 4 ====
First round
7	(United States) M Navratilova (Spain) A Sánchez Vicario	7	6
(Germany) B Lamade (Switzerland) P Schnyder	5	3
(Bulgaria) L Bacheva (Spain) C Torrens Valero	1	3
(Ukraine) T Perebiynis (Belarus) T Poutchek	6	6
WC	(United States) A Harkleroad (United States) B Mattek	2	5
WC	(United States) W Laiho (United States) J Lehnhoff	6	7
(Switzerland) E Gagliardi (United States) M Tu	6	7
11	(United States) N Pratt (Ukraine) E Tatarkova	4	5
15	(Germany) A Huber (Austria) B Schett	6	6
(Spain) E Bes (Spain) L Domínguez Lino	2	3
(France) S Testud (Italy) R Vinci	3	6	7
(Australia) L McShea (Japan) N Miyagi	6	3	5
(Netherlands) K Boogert (Netherlands) M Oremans	6	4	4
WC	(United States) M Bradley (United States) E Burdette	4	6	6
Q	(United States) J Embry (United States) A Spears	3	2
2	(Spain) V Ruano Pascual (Argentina) P Suárez	6	6

Second round
7	(United States) M Navratilova (Spain) A Sánchez Vicario	6	7
(Ukraine) T Perebiynis (Belarus) T Poutchek	3	5
WC	(United States) W Laiho (United States) J Lehnhoff	6	6^{3}	6
(Switzerland) E Gagliardi (United States) M Tu	3	7^{7}	3
15	(Germany) A Huber (Austria) B Schett	2	2
(France) S Testud (Italy) R Vinci	6	6
WC	(United States) M Bradley (United States) E Burdette	1	2
2	(Spain) V Ruano Pascual (Argentina) P Suárez	6	6

Third round
7	(United States) M Navratilova (Spain) A Sánchez Vicario	6	6
WC	(United States) W Laiho (United States) J Lehnhoff	3	0
(France) S Testud (Italy) R Vinci	6	7^{7}
2	(Spain) V Ruano Pascual (Argentina) P Suárez	3	6^{1}

Quarterfinals
7	(United States) M Navratilova (Spain) A Sánchez Vicario	2	6	4
(France) S Testud (Italy) R Vinci	6	4	6
