= 2001 US Open (tennis) =

- Date: August 27 – September 9
- Edition: 121st
- Category: Grand Slam (ITF)
- Surface: Hardcourt
- Location: New York City, U.S.

Champions

Men's singles
- (Australia) Lleyton Hewitt

Women's singles
- (United States) Venus Williams

Men's doubles
- (Zimbabwe) Wayne Black / (Zimbabwe) Kevin Ullyett

Women's doubles
- (United States) Lisa Raymond / (Australia) Rennae Stubbs

Mixed doubles
- (Australia) Todd Woodbridge / (Australia) Rennae Stubbs

Boys' singles
- (Luxembourg) Gilles Müller

Girls' singles
- (France) Marion Bartoli

Boys' doubles
- (Czech Republic) Tomáš Berdych / (Switzerland) Stéphane Bohli

Girls' doubles
- (Russia) Galina Fokina / (Russia) Svetlana Kuznetsova
- US Open

The 2001 US Open was held between August 27 and September 9, 2001. It was the final Grand Slam event of 2001.

Marat Safin was unsuccessful in his title defence, being defeated in the semifinals by Pete Sampras in a rematch of the 2000 final, while Venus Williams was successful in her title defense, beating her sister Serena in the women's final. 20-year-old Australian Lleyton Hewitt won the men's title, defeating Sampras in the final. It was the second consecutive US Open final defeat for Sampras.

== Seniors ==
=== Men's singles ===
(Australia) Lleyton Hewitt defeated (United States) Pete Sampras, 7–6^{(7–4)}, 6–1, 6–1

- It was Hewitt's 8th title of the year, and his 10th overall. It was his first career Grand Slam title, and he became the youngest male ever to be ranked number one, at the age of 20.

=== Women's singles ===
(United States) Venus Williams defeated (United States) Serena Williams, 6–2, 6–4

- It was Venus's 6th title of the year, and her 21st overall. It was her 4th career Grand Slam title, and her 2nd US Open title.

=== Men's doubles ===
(Zimbabwe) Wayne Black / (Zimbabwe) Kevin Ullyett defeated (United States) Donald Johnson / (United States) Jared Palmer, 7–6, 2–6, 6–3

=== Women's doubles ===
(United States) Lisa Raymond / (Australia) Rennae Stubbs defeated (United States) Kimberly Po / (France) Nathalie Tauziat, 6–2, 5–7, 7–5

=== Mixed doubles ===
(Australia) Rennae Stubbs / (Australia) Todd Woodbridge defeated (United States) Lisa Raymond / (India) Leander Paes, 6–4, 5–7, [11–9]

• It was Stubbs' 2nd and last career Grand Slam mixed doubles title and her 1st and only title at the US Open.
• It was Woodbridge's 7th and last career Grand Slam mixed doubles title and his 3rd title at the US Open.

== Juniors ==
=== Boys' singles ===
(Luxembourg) Gilles Müller defeated (Chinese Taipei) Yeu-Tzuoo Wang, 7–6(5), 6–2.

=== Girls' singles ===
(France) Marion Bartoli defeated (Russia) Svetlana Kuznetsova, (Note: Kuznetsova won the 2004 women's singles crown, and reached the 2007 final.) 4–6, 6–3, 6–4.

=== Boys' doubles ===
(Czech Republic) Tomáš Berdych / (Switzerland) Stéphane Bohli defeated (United States) Brendan Evans / (United States) Brett Joelson, 6–4, 6–4.

=== Girls' doubles ===
(Russia) Galina Fokina / (Russia) Svetlana Kuznetsova defeated (Federal Republic of Yugoslavia) Jelena Janković (Note: Janković reached the 2008 women's final.) / (Croatia) Matea Mezak, 7–5, 6–3.

== Notes ==
| Preceded by 2001 Wimbledon Championships | Grand Slams | Succeeded by 2002 Australian Open |
