= 2005 Wimbledon Championships – Men's singles qualifying =

Men's singles qualifying
- 2005 Wimbledon Championships

Events
Singles	men	women		boys	girls
Doubles	men	women	mixed	boys	girls
WC Singles	men	women	quad
WC Doubles	men	women	quad
Legends	men	women	seniors

Qualification
Singles	men	women
Doubles	men	women
- Wimbledon Championships

Players and pairs who neither have high enough rankings nor receive wild cards may participate in a qualifying tournament held one week before the annual Wimbledon Tennis Championships.

== Seeds ==
1. (Italy) Andreas Seppi (qualified)
2. (France) Arnaud Clément (qualified)
3. (United States) Justin Gimelstob (qualifying competition, lucky loser)
4. (United States) Paul Goldstein (qualifying competition, lucky loser)
5. (United States) Jeff Morrison (qualified)
6. (France) Antony Dupuis (qualified)
7. (Ecuador) Giovanni Lapentti (withdrew)
8. (France) Grégory Carraz (first round)
9. (Czech Republic) Robin Vik (first round)
10. (Belgium) Dick Norman (qualified)
11. (Italy) Daniele Bracciali (qualifying competition, lucky loser)
12. (Belgium) Kristof Vliegen (first round)
13. (United States) Jan-Michael Gambill (qualifying competition)
14. (Spain) Rubén Ramírez Hidalgo (first round)
15. (South Africa) Wesley Moodie (qualifying competition)
16. (Czech Republic) Lukáš Dlouhý (first round)
17. (Serbia and Montenegro) Novak Djokovic (qualified)
18. (France) Gilles Simon (qualifying competition)
19. (Spain) Fernando Vicente (qualifying competition)
20. (France) Nicolas Mahut (qualifying competition)
21. (Sweden) Michael Ryderstedt (qualifying competition)
22. (France) Jo-Wilfried Tsonga (withdrew)
23. (Switzerland) George Bastl (qualified)
24. (Slovakia) Michal Mertiňák (second round)
25. (United States) Amer Delić (qualifying competition)
26. (France) Olivier Patience (first round)
27. (Israel) Noam Okun (qualified)
28. (Chinese Taipei) Lu Yen-hsun (qualified)
29. (Germany) Alexander Waske (first round)
30. (Australia) Peter Luczak (first round)
31. (Paraguay) Ramón Delgado (second round)
32. (Brazil) André Sá (first round)

== Qualifiers ==
1. (Italy) Andreas Seppi
2. (France) Arnaud Clément
3. (Switzerland) George Bastl
4. (United Kingdom) Jamie Delgado
5. (United States) Jeff Morrison
6. (France) Antony Dupuis
7. (Thailand) Danai Udomchoke
8. (Belgium) Gilles Elseneer
9. (Croatia) Roko Karanušić
10. (Belgium) Dick Norman
11. (Chile) Adrián García
12. (Chinese Taipei) Lu Yen-hsun
13. (Israel) Noam Okun
14. (Finland) Tuomas Ketola
15. (Serbia and Montenegro) Novak Djokovic
16. (Germany) Tobias Summerer

== Lucky losers ==
1. (United States) Justin Gimelstob
2. (United States) Paul Goldstein
3. (Italy) Daniele Bracciali

== Qualifying draw ==
=== First qualifier ===
First round
1	(Italy) Andreas Seppi	7	6
(Italy) Paolo Lorenzi	5	0
(South Africa) Rik de Voest	6	6
(Brazil) Marcos Daniel	4	4
(Argentina) Juan Pablo Guzmán	2	3
(Belgium) Jeroen Masson	6	6
(Greece) Vasilis Mazarakis	2	6	5
18	(France) Gilles Simon	6	3	7

Second round
1	(Italy) Andreas Seppi	5	6	6
(South Africa) Rik de Voest	7	4	2
(Belgium) Jeroen Masson	6	2	2
18	(France) Gilles Simon	3	6	6

Qualifying competition
1	(Italy) Andreas Seppi	2	5	6	6	7
18	(France) Gilles Simon	6	7	2	2	5

=== Second qualifier ===
First round
2	(France) Arnaud Clément	6	6
(Spain) Marc López	2	2
Alt	(Chinese Taipei) Chen Ti	2	6^{3}
(United States) Alex Bogomolov Jr.	6	7^{7}
WC	(United Kingdom) Matthew Smith	7^{7}	3	6
(Brazil) Thiago Alves	6^{4}	6	8
(Brazil) Franco Ferreiro	5	3
25	(United States) Amer Delic	7	6

Second round
2	(France) Arnaud Clément	6	6
(United States) Alex Bogomolov Jr.	3	4
(Brazil) Thiago Alves	3	6^{5}
25	(United States) Amer Delic	6	7^{7}

Qualifying competition
2	(France) Arnaud Clément	7^{8}	6	6
25	(United States) Amer Delic	6^{6}	4	4

=== Third qualifier ===
First round
3	(United States) Justin Gimelstob	6	6
(Romania) Victor Ioniță	3	2
(Romania) Florin Mergea	4	6^{4}
(Belarus) Vladimir Voltchkov	6	7^{7}
(Czech Republic) Tomáš Cakl	7^{7}	0	0^{r}
(Sweden) Marcus Sarstrand	6^{4}	6	4
(France) Jean-Christophe Faurel	5	7^{8}	4
23	(Switzerland) George Bastl	7	6^{6}	6

Second round
3	(United States) Justin Gimelstob	6	0	6
(Belarus) Vladimir Voltchkov	4	6	3
(Sweden) Marcus Sarstrand	0	3
23	(Switzerland) George Bastl	6	6

Qualifying competition
3	(United States) Justin Gimelstob	0^{r}
23	(Switzerland) George Bastl	1

=== Fourth qualifier ===
First round
4	(United States) Paul Goldstein	6	7
(Argentina) Martín Vassallo Argüello	1	5
PR	(Sweden) Jacob Adaktusson	6	6
(Argentina) Cristian Villagrán	3	0
(United Kingdom) Jamie Delgado	6	7^{9}
(Japan) Takao Suzuki	1	6^{7}
(Australia) Chris Guccione	4	7^{7}	23
26	(France) Olivier Patience	6	6^{3}	21

Second round
4	(United States) Paul Goldstein	6	7
PR	(Sweden) Jacob Adaktusson	2	5
(United Kingdom) Jamie Delgado	6	7
(Australia) Chris Guccione	4	5

Qualifying competition
4	(United States) Paul Goldstein	6	7	1	5	2
(United Kingdom) Jamie Delgado	2	5	6	7	6

=== Fifth qualifier ===
First round
5	(United States) Jeff Morrison	6	6
WC	(United Kingdom) James Auckland	1	4
(United States) Robert Kendrick	6	5	12
(France) Jérôme Golmard	3	7	14
PR	(Sweden) Björn Rehnquist	2	3
WC	(United Kingdom) Andrew Banks	6	6
(Colombia) Alejandro Falla	5	6	6
32	(Brazil) André Sá	7	3	4

Second round
5	(United States) Jeff Morrison	7^{7}	6
(France) Jérôme Golmard	6^{2}	4
WC	(United Kingdom) Andrew Banks	6^{5}	5
(Colombia) Alejandro Falla	7^{7}	7

Qualifying competition
5	(United States) Jeff Morrison	6	3	7	4	6
(Colombia) Alejandro Falla	3	6	5	6	3

=== Sixth qualifier ===
First round
6	(France) Antony Dupuis	6	6
(Romania) Gabriel Moraru	4	4
(Italy) Leonardo Azzaro	2	6	8
(Japan) Gouichi Motomura	6	2	6
(Israel) Harel Levy	7	2	4
(Italy) Federico Luzzi	5	6	6
WC	(Serbia and Montenegro) Nenad Zimonjić	7^{9}	3	9
31	(Paraguay) Ramón Delgado	6^{7}	6	11

Second round
6	(France) Antony Dupuis	7	6
(Italy) Leonardo Azzaro	5	2
(Italy) Federico Luzzi	6	7^{8}
31	(Paraguay) Ramón Delgado	4	6^{6}

Qualifying competition
6	(France) Antony Dupuis	6^{4}	7^{7}	6	6
(Italy) Federico Luzzi	7^{7}	6^{1}	3	3

=== Seventh qualifier ===
First round
Alt	(Australia) Paul Baccanello	4	4
(Russia) Igor Kunitsyn	6	6
(Sweden) Filip Prpic	6	6
(Brazil) Júlio Silva	1	1
(Thailand) Danai Udomchoke	6	6
(France) Marc Gicquel	2	1
(Austria) Werner Eschauer	2	5
24	(Slovakia) Michal Mertiňák	6	7

Second round
(Russia) Igor Kunitsyn	6	4	2
(Sweden) Filip Prpic	3	6	6
(Thailand) Danai Udomchoke	6	6
24	(Slovakia) Michal Mertiňák	3	1

Qualifying competition
(Sweden) Filip Prpic	5	4	1
(Thailand) Danai Udomchoke	7	6	6

=== Eighth qualifier ===
First round
8	(France) Grégory Carraz	3	5
(Italy) Stefano Galvani	6	7
WC	(Austria) Julian Knowle	2	1
(Belgium) Gilles Elseneer	6	6
(France) Nicolas Devilder	3	6	7
WC	(United Kingdom) Arvind Parmar	6	4	9
(Argentina) Diego Hartfield	6	6
Alt	(Mexico) Alejandro Hernández	3	1

Second round
(Italy) Stefano Galvani	6	3	3
(Belgium) Gilles Elseneer	3	6	6
WC	(United Kingdom) Arvind Parmar	7^{7}	6
(Argentina) Diego Hartfield	6^{5}	3

Qualifying competition
(Belgium) Gilles Elseneer	6	3	7^{7}	6
WC	(United Kingdom) Arvind Parmar	1	6	6^{5}	0

=== Ninth qualifier ===
First round
9	(Czech Republic) Robin Vik	6	6^{3}	4
(Croatia) Roko Karanušić	4	7^{7}	6
(Spain) Gorka Fraile	2	3
(Spain) Daniel Gimeno Traver	6	6
WC	(United Kingdom) Neil Bamford	3	4
(Czech Republic) Jan Minář	6	6
(Serbia and Montenegro) Dušan Vemić	6	3	4
20	(France) Nicolas Mahut	4	6	6

Second round
(Croatia) Roko Karanušić	6	0	6
(Spain) Daniel Gimeno Traver	4	6	3
(Czech Republic) Jan Minář	2	3
20	(France) Nicolas Mahut	6	6

Qualifying competition
(Croatia) Roko Karanušić	1	6	6	6
20	(France) Nicolas Mahut	6	4	2	4

=== Tenth qualifier ===
First round
10	(Belgium) Dick Norman	6^{4}	6	6
(Austria) Daniel Köllerer	7^{7}	4	4
(Mexico) Miguel Gallardo Valles	2	4
(Belgium) Steve Darcis	6	6
(Norway) Jan Frode Andersen	2	3
(France) Sébastien de Chaunac	6	6
(Israel) Dudi Sela	6	6^{6}	0
19	(Spain) Fernando Vicente	0	7^{8}	6

Second round
10	(Belgium) Dick Norman	6	7
(Belgium) Steve Darcis	3	5
(France) Sébastien de Chaunac	3	6^{5}
19	(Spain) Fernando Vicente	6	7^{7}

Qualifying competition
10	(Belgium) Dick Norman	6	6	6
19	(Spain) Fernando Vicente	4	0	2

=== Eleventh qualifier ===
First round
11	(Italy) Daniele Bracciali	6	4
(Chile) Paul Capdeville	0	1^{r}
(Georgia (country)) Irakli Labadze	6	6
(Poland) Łukasz Kubot	4	4
(Chile) Adrián García	6	7^{9}
(United States) Matías Boeker	2	6^{7}
(Switzerland) Ivo Heuberger	1	6	6
29	(Germany) Alexander Waske	6	4	4

Second round
11	(Italy) Daniele Bracciali	6	2
(Georgia (country)) Irakli Labadze	4	0^{r}
(Chile) Adrián García	1	6	8
(Switzerland) Ivo Heuberger	6	2	6

Qualifying competition
11	(Italy) Daniele Bracciali	6^{8}	6	7	6^{7}	0^{r}
(Chile) Adrián García	7^{10}	3	5	7^{9}	1

=== Twelfth qualifier ===
First round
12/WC	(Belgium) Kristof Vliegen	3	1^{r}
(Italy) Uros Vico	6	3
WC	(United Kingdom) Lee Childs	4	6	8
(Canada) Frank Dancevic	6	3	10
(Germany) Michael Berrer	6	6
(Slovakia) Ladislav Švarc	4	2
(Argentina) Nicolás Todero	4	1
28	(Chinese Taipei) Lu Yen-hsun	6	6

Second round
(Italy) Uros Vico	6^{4}	7^{7}	11
(Canada) Frank Dancevic	7^{7}	6^{1}	9
(Germany) Michael Berrer	3	6	4
28	(Chinese Taipei) Lu Yen-hsun	6	4	6

Qualifying competition
(Italy) Uros Vico	6^{6}	5	3
28	(Chinese Taipei) Lu Yen-hsun	7^{8}	7	6

=== Thirteenth qualifier ===
First round
13	(United States) Jan-Michael Gambill	6	6
(Russia) Yuri Schukin	1	2
(Italy) Andrea Stoppini	7	7
(Austria) Alexander Peya	5	5
(France) Jean-Michel Pequery	6	6
(Belgium) Stefan Wauters	2	3
(Spain) Iván Navarro	5	3
27	(Israel) Noam Okun	7	6

Second round
13	(United States) Jan-Michael Gambill	7^{7}	7^{11}
(Italy) Andrea Stoppini	6^{5}	6^{9}
(France) Jean-Michel Pequery	6	3	4
27	(Israel) Noam Okun	3	6	6

Qualifying competition
13	(United States) Jan-Michael Gambill	2	4^{r}
27	(Israel) Noam Okun	6	5

=== Fourteenth qualifier ===
First round
14	(Spain) Rubén Ramírez Hidalgo	3	6	1
(Czech Republic) Pavel Šnobel	6	4	6
(United States) Glenn Weiner	6^{6}	5
(Ukraine) Sergiy Stakhovsky	7^{8}	7
(Finland) Tuomas Ketola	6	6
(Austria) Oliver Marach	4	2
(Denmark) Kristian Pless	6	6
30	(Australia) Peter Luczak	2	4

Second round
(Czech Republic) Pavel Šnobel	6^{5}	6	3
(Ukraine) Sergiy Stakhovsky	7^{7}	4	6
(Finland) Tuomas Ketola	6	6
(Denmark) Kristian Pless	4	3

Qualifying competition
(Ukraine) Sergiy Stakhovsky	4	4	6	2
(Finland) Tuomas Ketola	6	6	3	6

=== Fifteenth qualifier ===
First round
15	(South Africa) Wesley Moodie	6	6
(Austria) Zbynek Mlynarik	2	0
(Costa Rica) Juan Antonio Marín	6	7
(Italy) Giorgio Galimberti	4	5
(Chinese Taipei) Wang Yeu-tzuoo	6	6
(Pakistan) Aisam-ul-Haq Qureshi	4	2
(United States) Brian Baker	1^{r}
17	(Serbia and Montenegro) Novak Djokovic	1

Second round
15	(South Africa) Wesley Moodie	6	7
(Costa Rica) Juan Antonio Marín	2	5
(Chinese Taipei) Wang Yeu-tzuoo	4	4
17	(Serbia and Montenegro) Novak Djokovic	6	6

Qualifying competition
15	(South Africa) Wesley Moodie	6	0	7^{7}	6^{4}	3
17	(Serbia and Montenegro) Novak Djokovic	4	6	6^{2}	7^{7}	6

=== Sixteenth qualifier ===
First round
16	(Czech Republic) Lukáš Dlouhý	6	1	3
(Canada) Frédéric Niemeyer	2	6	6
(United States) Brian Vahaly	3	2
(Germany) Tobias Summerer	6	6
(Switzerland) Marco Chiudinelli	6	6^{4}	6
(United States) Bobby Reynolds	4	7^{7}	3
(Argentina) Sergio Roitman	6	4	2
21	(Sweden) Michael Ryderstedt	4	6	6

Second round
(Canada) Frédéric Niemeyer	5	4
(Germany) Tobias Summerer	7	6
(Switzerland) Marco Chiudinelli	0	2^{r}
21	(Sweden) Michael Ryderstedt	6	4

Qualifying competition
(Germany) Tobias Summerer	6	6	6
21	(Sweden) Michael Ryderstedt	3	4	2
