= 2005 Wimbledon Championships – Women's doubles qualifying =

Women's doubles qualifying
- 2005 Wimbledon Championships

Events
Singles	men	women		boys	girls
Doubles	men	women	mixed	boys	girls
WC Singles	men	women	quad
WC Doubles	men	women	quad
Legends	men	women	seniors

Qualification
Singles	men	women
Doubles	men	women
- Wimbledon Championships

Players and pairs who neither have high enough rankings nor receive wild cards may participate in a qualifying tournament held one week before the annual Wimbledon Tennis Championships.

== Seeds ==
1. (Canada) Maureen Drake / (United States) Carly Gullickson (first round)
2. (Ukraine) Alona Bondarenko / (Russia) Anastasia Rodionova (qualified)
3. (Poland) Klaudia Jans / (Poland) Alicja Rosolska (first round)
4. (Latvia) Līga Dekmeijere / (Germany) Jasmin Wöhr (first round)
5. (Bosnia and Herzegovina) Mervana Jugić-Salkić / (Germany) Martina Müller (first round)
6. (Ukraine) Yuliana Fedak / (United States) Lilia Osterloh (qualifying competition, lucky losers)
7. (United States) Teryn Ashley / (United States) Lindsay Lee-Waters (first round)
8. (France) Caroline Dhenin / (France) Stéphanie Foretz (first round)

== Qualifiers ==
1. (Australia) Evie Dominikovic / (Japan) Aiko Nakamura
2. (Ukraine) Alona Bondarenko / (Russia) Anastasia Rodionova
3. (Japan) Rika Fujiwara / (Japan) Saori Obata
4. (Belarus) Tatiana Poutchek / (Belarus) Anastasiya Yakimova

== Lucky losers ==
1. (Ukraine) Yuliana Fedak / (United States) Lilia Osterloh
2. (Argentina) Erica Krauth / (Canada) Marie-Ève Pelletier
3. (Romania) Edina Gallovits / (United States) Angela Haynes

== Qualifying draw ==
=== First qualifier ===
First round
1	(Canada) Maureen Drake (United States) Carly Gullickson	2	6	7
(Australia) Evie Dominikovic (Japan) Aiko Nakamura	6	3	9
(Romania) Edina Gallovits (United States) Angela Haynes	7^{7}	6
8	(France) Caroline Dhenin (France) Stéphanie Foretz	6^{3}	2

Qualifying competition
(Australia) Evie Dominikovic (Japan) Aiko Nakamura	6	6
(Romania) Edina Gallovits (United States) Angela Haynes	1	0

=== Second qualifier ===
First round
2	(Ukraine) Alona Bondarenko (Russia) Anastasia Rodionova	6	7
(Brazil) Maria Fernanda Alves (Spain) Laura Pous Tió	1	5
(Argentina) Erica Krauth (Canada) Marie-Ève Pelletier	1	7^{7}	11
7	(United States) Teryn Ashley (United States) Lindsay Lee-Waters	6	6^{4}	9

Qualifying competition
2	(Ukraine) Alona Bondarenko (Russia) Anastasia Rodionova	6	6
(Argentina) Erica Krauth (Canada) Marie-Ève Pelletier	2	3

=== Third qualifier ===
First round
3	(Poland) Klaudia Jans (Poland) Alicja Rosolska	1	3
(Japan) Rika Fujiwara (Japan) Saori Obata	6	6
(France) Séverine Beltrame (France) Camille Pin	6	7^{7}
5	(Bosnia and Herzegovina) Mervana Jugić-Salkić (Germany) Martina Müller	4	6^{2}

Qualifying competition
(Japan) Rika Fujiwara (Japan) Saori Obata	6	6
(France) Séverine Beltrame (France) Camille Pin	1	3

=== Fourth qualifier ===
First round
4	(Latvia) Līga Dekmeijere (Germany) Jasmin Wöhr	5	2
(Belarus) Tatiana Poutchek (Belarus) Anastasiya Yakimova	7	6
WC	(United Kingdom) Hannah Collin (United Kingdom) Karen Paterson	2	0
6	(Ukraine) Yuliana Fedak (United States) Lilia Osterloh	6	6

Qualifying competition
(Belarus) Tatiana Poutchek (Belarus) Anastasiya Yakimova	6	6
6	(Ukraine) Yuliana Fedak (United States) Lilia Osterloh	1	2
