= 2005 Wimbledon Championships – Men's doubles qualifying =

Men's doubles qualifying
- 2005 Wimbledon Championships

Events
Singles	men	women		boys	girls
Doubles	men	women	mixed	boys	girls
WC Singles	men	women	quad
WC Doubles	men	women	quad
Legends	men	women	seniors

Qualification
Singles	men	women
Doubles	men	women
- Wimbledon Championships

Players and pairs who neither have high enough rankings nor receive wild cards may participate in a qualifying tournament held one week before the annual Wimbledon Tennis Championships.

== Seeds ==
1. (Czech Republic) Lukáš Dlouhý / (Czech Republic) David Škoch (qualifying competition, lucky losers)
2. (United States) Huntley Montgomery / (United States) Tripp Phillips (first round)
3. (Sweden) Robert Lindstedt / (Austria) Alexander Peya (qualified)
4. (United States) James Blake / (The Bahamas) Mark Merklein (qualifying competition)
5. (Australia) Stephen Huss / (South Africa) Wesley Moodie (qualified)
6. (Poland) Łukasz Kubot / (United States) Jason Marshall (first round)
7. (United States) Brandon Coupe / (South Africa) Rik de Voest (first round)
8. n/a

== Qualifiers ==
1. (Finland) Tuomas Ketola / (Canada) Frédéric Niemeyer
2. (Paraguay) Ramón Delgado / (Brazil) André Sá
3. (Sweden) Robert Lindstedt / (Austria) Alexander Peya
4. (Australia) Stephen Huss / (South Africa) Wesley Moodie

== Lucky losers ==
1. (Czech Republic) Lukáš Dlouhý / (Czech Republic) David Škoch
2. (United Kingdom) Ross Hutchins / (United Kingdom) Martin Lee

== Qualifying draw ==
=== First qualifier ===
First round
1	(Czech Republic) Lukáš Dlouhý (Czech Republic) David Škoch	6	2	6
(Brazil) Marcos Daniel (Israel) Noam Okun	2	6	3
Alt	(Romania) Florin Mergea (Romania) Gabriel Moraru	4	4
Alt	(Finland) Tuomas Ketola (Canada) Frédéric Niemeyer	6	6

Qualifying competition
1	(Czech Republic) Lukáš Dlouhý (Czech Republic) David Škoch	3	4	6^{4}
Alt	(Finland) Tuomas Ketola (Canada) Frédéric Niemeyer	6	6	7^{7}

=== Second qualifier ===
First round
2	(United States) Huntley Montgomery (United States) Tripp Phillips	3	3
(Paraguay) Ramón Delgado (Brazil) André Sá	6	6
WC	(United Kingdom) Ross Hutchins (United Kingdom) Martin Lee	7^{8}	6
7	(United States) Brandon Coupe (South Africa) Rik de Voest	6^{6}	2

Qualifying competition
(Paraguay) Ramón Delgado (Brazil) André Sá	6	6	6
WC	(United Kingdom) Ross Hutchins (United Kingdom) Martin Lee	3	4	1

=== Third qualifier ===
First round
3	(Sweden) Robert Lindstedt (Austria) Alexander Peya	6	7^{7}
Alt	(United States) Bobby Reynolds (United States) Brian Vahaly	4	6^{2}
(United States) Jan-Michael Gambill (United States) Paul Goldstein	4	6	8
6	(Poland) Łukasz Kubot (United States) Jason Marshall	6	1	6

Qualifying competition
3	(Sweden) Robert Lindstedt (Austria) Alexander Peya	6	6^{4}	6	6
(United States) Jan-Michael Gambill (United States) Paul Goldstein	0	7^{7}	0	4

=== Fourth qualifier ===
First round
4	(United States) James Blake (The Bahamas) Mark Merklein	6	6^{5}	6
Alt	(Brazil) Franco Ferreiro (Spain) Fernando Vicente	1	7^{7}	4
PR	(Australia) Scott Draper (Australia) Peter Luczak	4	5
5	(Australia) Stephen Huss (South Africa) Wesley Moodie	6	7

Qualifying competition
4	(United States) James Blake (The Bahamas) Mark Merklein	5	6^{2}	6^{2}
5	(Australia) Stephen Huss (South Africa) Wesley Moodie	7	7^{7}	7^{7}
