= 2005 Wimbledon Championships – Women's singles qualifying =

Women's singles qualifying
- 2005 Wimbledon Championships

Details
- Draw: 96
- Seeds: 24

Events
Singles	men	women		boys	girls
Doubles	men	women	mixed	boys	girls
WC Singles	men	women	quad
WC Doubles	men	women	quad
Legends	men	women	seniors

Qualification
Singles	men	women
Doubles	men	women
- Wimbledon Championships

Players and pairs who neither have high enough rankings nor receive wild cards may participate in a qualifying tournament held one week before the annual Wimbledon Tennis Championships.

== Seeds ==
1. (Spain) Laura Pous Tió (second round)
2. (France) Stéphanie Cohen-Aloro (second round)
3. (United States) Lindsay Lee-Waters (first round)
4. (Canada) Marie-Ève Pelletier (second round)
5. (United States) Jamea Jackson (qualified)
6. (Russia) Ekaterina Bychkova (first round)
7. (Czech Republic) Eva Birnerová (qualifying competition, lucky loser)
8. (France) Camille Pin (first round)
9. (France) Séverine Beltrame (qualifying competition, lucky loser)
10. (Germany) Sandra Klösel (first round)
11. (Czech Republic) Sandra Kleinová (first round)
12. (Belarus) Anastasiya Yakimova (second round)
13. (Russia) Galina Voskoboeva (first round)
14. (Italy) Mara Santangelo (qualified)
15. (Israel) Tzipora Obziler (second round)
16. (United States) Chanda Rubin (withdrew)
17. (Romania) Edina Gallovits (second round)
18. (Finland) Emma Laine (first round)
19. (Hungary) Melinda Czink (qualifying competition, lucky loser)
20. (Bulgaria) Tsvetana Pironkova (qualifying competition)
21. (Austria) Yvonne Meusburger (second round)
22. (India) Shikha Uberoi (second round)
23. (Czech Republic) Hana Šromová (first round)
24. (Brazil) Maria Fernanda Alves (first round)

== Qualifiers ==
1. (Czech Republic) Kateřina Böhmová
2. (Sweden) Sofia Arvidsson
3. (United States) Ashley Harkleroad
4. (Belgium) Els Callens
5. (United States) Jamea Jackson
6. (United States) Meilen Tu
7. (Japan) Saori Obata
8. (Italy) Mara Santangelo
9. (Germany) Sabine Klaschka
10. (Ukraine) Kateryna Bondarenko
11. (Ukraine) Julia Vakulenko
12. (Belarus) Tatiana Poutchek

== Lucky losers ==
1. (Czech Republic) Eva Birnerová
2. (France) Séverine Beltrame
3. (Hungary) Melinda Czink

== Qualifying draw ==
=== First qualifier ===
First round
1	(Spain) Laura Pous Tió	6	6
(Hungary) Zsófia Gubacsi	4	0
(Czech Republic) Kateřina Böhmová	6	6
(United States) Jennifer Hopkins	3	1
(Hungary) Kira Nagy	6	2	5
(Netherlands) Michelle Gerards	4	6	7
(Italy) Nathalie Viérin	6	4	3
21	(Austria) Yvonne Meusburger	4	6	6

Second round
1	(Spain) Laura Pous Tió	4	2
(Czech Republic) Kateřina Böhmová	6	6
(Netherlands) Michelle Gerards	4	7	8
21	(Austria) Yvonne Meusburger	6	5	6

Qualifying competition
(Czech Republic) Kateřina Böhmová	7^{9}	6
(Netherlands) Michelle Gerards	6^{7}	0

=== Second qualifier ===
First round
2	(France) Stéphanie Cohen-Aloro	7^{7}	6
(Canada) Maureen Drake	6^{1}	3
(Japan) Ryōko Fuda	2	0
(Sweden) Sofia Arvidsson	6	6
(Argentina) Vanina García Sokol	2	3
(Portugal) Frederica Piedade	6	6
(Spain) Paula García	6	6
WC	(United Kingdom) Anna Hawkins	4	2

Second round
2	(France) Stéphanie Cohen-Aloro	2	2
(Sweden) Sofia Arvidsson	6	6
(Portugal) Frederica Piedade	6	6
(Spain) Paula García	2	1

Qualifying competition
(Sweden) Sofia Arvidsson	6	6
(Portugal) Frederica Piedade	0	1

=== Third qualifier ===
First round
3	(United States) Lindsay Lee-Waters	4	3
(Belgium) Kirsten Flipkens	6	6
(Russia) Lioudmila Skavronskaia	3	7	4
(Bosnia and Herzegovina) Mervana Jugić-Salkić	6	5	6
(United States) Ashley Harkleroad	6	3	6
(Czech Republic) Lucie Hradecká	1	6	2
WC	(United Kingdom) Jade Curtis	3	0
15	(Israel) Tzipora Obziler	6	6

Second round
(Belgium) Kirsten Flipkens	6	6
(Bosnia and Herzegovina) Mervana Jugić-Salkić	0	2
(United States) Ashley Harkleroad	6	6
15	(Israel) Tzipora Obziler	4	2

Qualifying competition
(Belgium) Kirsten Flipkens	5	2
(United States) Ashley Harkleroad	7	6

=== Fourth qualifier ===
First round
4	(Canada) Marie-Ève Pelletier	6	6
WC	(United Kingdom) Hannah Collin	2	2
Alt	(Japan) Seiko Okamoto	6	6
(Romania) Delia Sescioreanu	1	2
(Germany) Stephanie Gehrlein	2	7	6
(United States) Teryn Ashley	6	5	1
(Belgium) Els Callens	6	6
24	(Brazil) Maria Fernanda Alves	2	2

Second round
4	(Canada) Marie-Ève Pelletier	6	4	3
Alt	(Japan) Seiko Okamoto	1	6	6
(Germany) Stephanie Gehrlein	3	7^{10}	3
(Belgium) Els Callens	6	6^{8}	6

Qualifying competition
Alt	(Japan) Seiko Okamoto	6^{2}	4
(Belgium) Els Callens	7^{7}	6

=== Fifth qualifier ===
First round
5	(United States) Jamea Jackson	6	6
(Czech Republic) Lenka Němečková	1	3
(Croatia) Nika Ožegović	6	3	6
(Germany) Martina Müller	3	6	2
(Estonia) Maret Ani	3	6	5
(Ukraine) Viktoriya Kutuzova	6	3	7
(South Africa) Natalie Grandin	3	2
22	(India) Shikha Uberoi	6	6

Second round
5	(United States) Jamea Jackson	6	6
(Croatia) Nika Ožegović	4	2
(Ukraine) Viktoriya Kutuzova	6	7
22	(India) Shikha Uberoi	4	5

Qualifying competition
5	(United States) Jamea Jackson	7	6
(Ukraine) Viktoriya Kutuzova	5	2

=== Sixth qualifier ===
First round
6	(Russia) Ekaterina Bychkova	6	3	4
(Austria) Sybille Bammer	2	6	6
WC	(United Kingdom) Emily Webley-Smith	5	3
(United States) Meilen Tu	7	6
(Slovakia) Stanislava Hrozenská	1	3
(Argentina) Clarisa Fernández	6	6
(Hungary) Virág Németh	4
13	(Russia) Galina Voskoboeva	3^{r}

Second round
(Austria) Sybille Bammer	3	3
(United States) Meilen Tu	6	6
(Argentina) Clarisa Fernández	6	6
(Hungary) Virág Németh	3	2

Qualifying competition
(United States) Meilen Tu	6	6
(Argentina) Clarisa Fernández	2	2

=== Seventh qualifier ===
First round
7	(Czech Republic) Eva Birnerová	6	6
WC	(United States) Carly Gullickson	2	2
(Slovakia) Ľubomíra Kurhajcová	6	6
(Slovakia) Henrieta Nagyová	2	3
(Czech Republic) Libuše Průšová	3	5
(United States) Jessica Kirkland	6	7
(Japan) Saori Obata	6	6
23	(Czech Republic) Hana Šromová	1	2

Second round
7	(Czech Republic) Eva Birnerová	6	6
(Slovakia) Ľubomíra Kurhajcová	3	1
(United States) Jessica Kirkland	1	0
(Japan) Saori Obata	6	6

Qualifying competition
7	(Czech Republic) Eva Birnerová	4	6	2
(Japan) Saori Obata	6	4	6

=== Eighth qualifier ===
First round
8	(France) Camille Pin	3	3
(Germany) Kathrin Wörle	6	6
(Ukraine) Olga Savchuk	3	3
PR	(Germany) Jana Kandarr	6	6
(Ukraine) Yuliya Beygelzimer	6	6^{4}	1
(United States) Sunitha Rao	4	7^{7}	6
(Czech Republic) Eva Hrdinová	2	6	2
14	(Italy) Mara Santangelo	6	3	6

Second round
(Germany) Kathrin Wörle	6^{2}	6	6
PR	(Germany) Jana Kandarr	7^{7}	2	8
(United States) Sunitha Rao
14	(Italy) Mara Santangelo	w/o

Qualifying competition
PR	(Germany) Jana Kandarr	3	3
14	(Italy) Mara Santangelo	6	6

=== Ninth qualifier ===
First round
9	(France) Séverine Beltrame	6	2	6
(Romania) Magda Mihalache	4	6	3
WC	(United Kingdom) Melanie South	7	3	4
(Hungary) Rita Kuti-Kis	5	6	6
(Netherlands) Elise Tamaëla	7^{11}	1	5
(Germany) Sabine Klaschka	6^{9}	6	7
(Russia) Anastasia Rodionova	5	6	3
17	(Romania) Edina Gallovits	7	2	6

Second round
9	(France) Séverine Beltrame	4	6	6
(Hungary) Rita Kuti-Kis	6	3	4
(Germany) Sabine Klaschka	6	6
17	(Romania) Edina Gallovits	4	3

Qualifying competition
9	(France) Séverine Beltrame	6	4	3
(Germany) Sabine Klaschka	3	6	6

=== Tenth qualifier ===
First round
10	(Germany) Sandra Klösel	3	0
(Puerto Rico) Vilmarie Castellvi	6	6
(Japan) Shiho Hisamatsu	6	6^{4}	6
(Spain) Conchita Martínez Granados	3	7^{7}	0
(Croatia) Silvija Talaja	6	7^{7}
(Sweden) Hanna Nooni	1	6^{4}
WC	(Ukraine) Kateryna Bondarenko	6	2	6
18	(Finland) Emma Laine	3	6	0

Second round
(Puerto Rico) Vilmarie Castellvi	6	6
(Japan) Shiho Hisamatsu	4	2
(Croatia) Silvija Talaja	5	3
WC	(Ukraine) Kateryna Bondarenko	7	6

Qualifying competition
(Puerto Rico) Vilmarie Castellvi	5	2
WC	(Ukraine) Kateryna Bondarenko	7	6

=== Eleventh qualifier ===
First round
11	(Czech Republic) Sandra Kleinová	3	0^{r}
(Ukraine) Julia Vakulenko	6	2
(Croatia) Ivana Abramović	6	1	7
(South Africa) Chanelle Scheepers	4	6	5
WC	(United Kingdom) Karen Paterson	3	1
(Italy) Adriana Serra Zanetti	6	6
(Hungary) Anikó Kapros	5	4
20	(Bulgaria) Tsvetana Pironkova	7	6

Second round
(Ukraine) Julia Vakulenko	7^{7}	3
(Croatia) Ivana Abramović	6^{5}	0^{r}
(Italy) Adriana Serra Zanetti	2	4
20	(Bulgaria) Tsvetana Pironkova	6	6

Qualifying competition
(Ukraine) Julia Vakulenko	6	6
20	(Bulgaria) Tsvetana Pironkova	3	3

=== Twelfth qualifier ===
First round
12	(Belarus) Anastasiya Yakimova	6	6
(Canada) Stéphanie Dubois	2	2
(Germany) Vanessa Henke	4	2
(Belarus) Tatiana Poutchek	6	6
(Croatia) Matea Mezak	3	7	6
(Czech Republic) Olga Blahotová	6	5	3
(Slovakia) Zuzana Kučová	1	2
19	(Hungary) Melinda Czink	6	6

Second round
12	(Belarus) Anastasiya Yakimova	3	5
(Belarus) Tatiana Poutchek	6	7
(Croatia) Matea Mezak	4	6	1
19	(Hungary) Melinda Czink	6	3	6

Qualifying competition
(Belarus) Tatiana Poutchek	6	6
19	(Hungary) Melinda Czink	3	2
