= 2005 Davis Cup World Group play-offs =

2005 tennis competition

The World Group play-offs were the main play-offs of 2005 Davis Cup. Winners advanced to the World Group, and loser were relegated in the Zonal Regions I.

== Teams ==
Bold indicates team has qualified for the 2006 Davis Cup World Group.

From World Group

- **Spain**
- **Switzerland**
- **Austria**
- Czech Republic
- **Chile**
- **Sweden**
- **Belarus**
- **United States**

From Americas Group I

- Canada
- Ecuador

From Asia/Oceania Group I

- Pakistan
- India

From Europe/Africa Group I

- Great Britain
- Belgium
- Italy
- **Germany**

== Results ==
**Seeded teams**

- Austria
- Belarus
- Chile
- Czech Republic
- Spain
- Sweden
- Switzerland
- United States

**Unseeded teams**

- Belgium
- Canada
- Ecuador
- Germany
- Great Britain
- India
- Italy
- Pakistan

Home team	Score	Visiting team	Location	Venue	Door	Surface
**Austria**	4–1	Ecuador	Pörtschach	Werzer Arena	Outdoor	Hard
Canada	2–3	**Belarus**	Toronto	Rexall Centre	Outdoor	Hard
**Chile**	5–0	Pakistan	Santiago	Estadio Nacional	Outdoor	Clay
Czech Republic	2–3	**Germany**	Liberec	Tipsport Arena (Liberec)	Indoor	Clay
Italy	2–3	**Spain**	Torre del Greco	Sporting Club Oplonti	Outdoor	Clay
India	1–3	**Sweden**	New Delhi	R.K. Khanna Tennis Complex	Outdoor	Grass
**Switzerland**	5–0	Great Britain	Geneva	Palexpo	Indoor	Clay
Belgium	1–4	**United States**	Leuven	Sportplaza Leuven	Indoor	Clay

- Austria, Belarus, Chile, Spain, Sweden, Switzerland and United States will remain in the World Group in 2006.
- Germany are promoted to the World Group in 2006.
- Belgium, Canada, Ecuador, Great Britain, India, Italy and Pakistan will remain in Zonal Group I in 2006.
- Czech Republic are relegated to Zonal Group I in 2006.

== Playoff results ==
=== Austria vs. Ecuador ===
Austria
4
Werzer Arena, Pörtschach, Austria
23–25 September 2005
Hard

Ecuador
1

			1	2	3	4	5
1	(Austria) (Ecuador)	**Jürgen Melzer**; Giovanni Lapentti	**6**; 1	**6**; 0	**6**; 2
2	(Austria) (Ecuador)	Stefan Koubek; **Nicolás Lapentti**	**7**; 5	**6**; 4	4; **6**	6^{5} **7^{7}**	5; **7**
3	(Austria) (Ecuador)	**Julian Knowle / Jürgen Melzer**; Giovanni Lapentti / Nicolás Lapentti	2; **6**	**6**; 4	**6**; 0	**6**; 3
4	(Austria) (Ecuador)	**Jürgen Melzer**; Nicolás Lapentti	**7**; 5	**6**; 4	**7**; 5
5	(Austria) (Ecuador)	**Stefan Koubek**; Carlos Avellán	**6**; 3	**6**; 2

=== Canada vs. Belarus ===
Canada
2
Rexall Centre, Toronto, Ontario, Canada
23–25 September 2005
Hard

Belarus
3

			1	2	3	4	5
1	(Canada) (Belarus)	**Frank Dancevic**; Vladimir Voltchkov	5; **7**	**6**; 4	4; **6**	**7^{7}** 6^{3}	**6**; 3
2	(Canada) (Belarus)	Daniel Nestor; **Max Mirnyi**	**7^{7}** 6^{4}	5; **7**	1; 2			**retired**
3	(Canada) (Belarus)	**Daniel Nestor / Frédéric Niemeyer**; Max Mirnyi / Vladimir Voltchkov	**7**; 5	**6**; 2	3; **6**	**7^{8}** 6^{6}
4	(Canada) (Belarus)	Frank Dancevic; **Max Mirnyi**	**6**; 4	3; **6**	4; **6**	**6**; 3	4; **6**
5	(Canada) (Belarus)	Frédéric Niemeyer; **Vladimir Voltchkov**	2; **6**	**7^{7}** 6^{2}	3; **6**	4; **6**

=== Chile vs. Pakistan ===
Chile
5
Estadio Nacional, Santiago, Chile
23–25 September 2005
Clay

Pakistan
0

			1	2	3	4	5
1	(Chile) (Pakistan)	**Fernando González**; Aqeel Khan	**6**; 0	**6**; 0	**6**; 1
2	(Chile) (Pakistan)	**Nicolás Massú**; Aisam-ul-Haq Qureshi	**6**; 2	**7^{7}** 6^{4}	**6**; 1
3	(Chile) (Pakistan)	**Fernando González / Nicolás Massú**; Aqeel Khan / Aisam-ul-Haq Qureshi	**6**; 1	**6**; 3	**6**; 0
4	(Chile) (Pakistan)	**Paul Capdeville**; Shahzad Khan	**6**; 0	**6**; 1
5	(Chile) (Pakistan)	**Adrián García**; Aqeel Khan	**6**; 2	**6**; 4

=== Czech Republic vs. Germany ===
Czech Republic
2
Tipsport Arena (Liberec), Liberec, Czech Republic
23–25 September 2005
Clay (i)

Germany
3

			1	2	3	4	5
1	(Czech Republic) (Germany)	**Tomáš Berdych**; Tommy Haas	4; **6**	4; **6**	**6**; 1	**7^{11}** 6^{9}	**6**; 3
2	(Czech Republic) (Germany)	Tomáš Zíb; **Nicolas Kiefer**	6^{4} **7^{7}**	**6**; 4	4; **6**	2; **6**
3	(Czech Republic) (Germany)	František Čermák / Leoš Friedl; **Tommy Haas / Alexander Waske**	**6**; 4	5; **7**	2; **2**	6; **6**	4; **4**
4	(Czech Republic) (Germany)	**Tomáš Berdych**; Nicolas Kiefer	6^{5} **7^{7}**	**6**; 3	2; **6**	**6**; 4	**7**; 5
5	(Czech Republic) (Germany)	Tomáš Zíb; **Tommy Haas**	**7^{7}** 6^{3}	5; **7**	2; **6**	0; **6**

=== Italy vs. Spain ===
Italy
2
Sporting Club Oplonti, Torre del Greco, Italy
23–25 September 2005
Clay

Spain
3

			1	2	3	4	5
1	(Italy) (Spain)	**Andreas Seppi**; Juan Carlos Ferrero	5; **7**	3; **6**	**6**; 0	**6**; 3	**6**; 2
2	(Italy) (Spain)	Daniele Bracciali; **Rafael Nadal**	3; **6**	2; **6**	1; **6**
3	(Italy) (Spain)	**Daniele Bracciali / Giorgio Galimberti**; Rafael Nadal / Feliciano López	4; **6**	**6**; 4	**6**; 2	4; **6**	**9**; 7
4	(Italy) (Spain)	Andreas Seppi; **Rafael Nadal**	1; **6**	2; **6**	**7**; 5	4; **6**
5	(Italy) (Spain)	Daniele Bracciali; **Juan Carlos Ferrero**	3; **6**	0; **6**	3; **6**

=== India vs. Sweden ===
India
1
R.K. Khanna Tennis Complex, New Delhi, India
23–25 September 2005
Grass

Sweden
3

			1	2	3	4	5
1	(India) (Sweden)	Prakash Amritraj; **Jonas Björkman**	4; **6**	4; **6**	4; **6**
2	(India) (Sweden)	Rohan Bopanna; **Thomas Johansson**	6^{3} **7^{7}**	6^{2} **7^{7}**	6^{4} **7^{7}**
3	(India) (Sweden)	**Mahesh Bhupathi / Leander Paes**; Simon Aspelin / Jonas Björkman	3; **6**	**6**; 3	**6**; 4	**6**; 3
4	(India) (Sweden)	Prakash Amritraj; **Thomas Johansson**	4; **6**	3; **6**	2; **6**
5	(India) (Sweden)	Rohan Bopanna; Jonas Björkman						**not** **played**

=== Switzerland vs. Great Britain ===
Switzerland
5
Palexpo, Geneva, Switzerland
23–25 September 2005
Clay (i)

Great Britain
0

			1	2	3	4	5
1	(Switzerland) (United Kingdom)	**Roger Federer**; Alan Mackin	**6**; 0	**6**; 0	**6**; 2
2	(Switzerland) (United Kingdom)	**Stanislas Wawrinka**; Andy Murray	**6**; 3	**7^{7}** 6^{5}	**6**; 4
3	(Switzerland) (United Kingdom)	**Yves Allegro / Roger Federer**; Andy Murray / Greg Rusedski	**7**; 5	2; **6**	**7^{7}** 6^{1}	**6**; 2
4	(Switzerland) (United Kingdom)	**George Bastl**; David Sherwood	**6**; 3	**6**; 0
5	(Switzerland) (United Kingdom)	**Stanislas Wawrinka**; Alan Mackin	**7**; 5	**7^{7}** 6^{5}

=== Belgium vs. United States ===
Belgium
1
Sportplaza Leuven, Leuven, Belgium
23–25 September 2005
Clay (i)

United States
4

			1	2	3	4	5
1	(Belgium) (United States)	**Olivier Rochus**; James Blake	**6**; 4	**7**; 5	**6**; 1
2	(Belgium) (United States)	Christophe Rochus; **Andy Roddick**	1; **6**	2; **6**	3; **6**
3	(Belgium) (United States)	Olivier Rochus / Kristof Vliegen; **Bob Bryan / Mike Bryan**	3; **6**	**7^{7}** 6^{2}	1; **6**	3; **6**
4	(Belgium) (United States)	Olivier Rochus; **Andy Roddick**	**7^{7}** 6^{4}	6^{4} **7^{7}**	6^{5} **7^{7}**	**6**; 4	3; **3**
5	(Belgium) (United States)	Steve Darcis; **James Blake**	5; **7**	1; **6**
