= William Barker (tennis) =

British tennis player (born 1981)

- Country (sports): United Kingdom
- Born: 21 March 1981 (age 44); Solihull, England
- Prize money: $11,543

Doubles
- Career record: 0–2
- Highest ranking: No. 244 (25 July 2005)

Grand Slam doubles results
- Wimbledon: 1R (2005)

William Barker (born 21 March 1981) is a British former professional tennis player.

Barker played collegiate tennis for Rice University in the United States, forming a doubles partnership with twin brother Richard. The pair had 35 consecutive wins in their junior year, culminating in a semifinal loss at the NCAA Division I Championships.

On the professional tour, Barker had a best doubles ranking of 244 in the world and partnered his brother in the main draw of the 2005 Wimbledon Championships, where the wildcard pairing were defeated in the first round by top seeds Jonas Björkman and Max Mirnyi.
