= Jayant Mistry =

British wheelchair tennis player

- Country (sports): Great Britain
- Born: 29 August 1966 (age 59) Leicester, Great Britain
- Turned pro: 1992
- Retired: 2007
- Plays: Right-handed (one-handed backhand)

Singles
- Career titles: 20
- Highest ranking: No. 8 (14 August 2000)

Other tournaments
- Paralympic Games: 3R (1996, 2000, 2004)

Doubles
- Career titles: 48
- Highest ranking: No. 2 (27 May 2002)

Grand Slam doubles results
- Wimbledon: W (2005)

Other doubles tournaments
- Masters Doubles: W (2005)
- Paralympic Games: 4th (2000)

Jayant Mistry (born 29 August 1966) is a retired British wheelchair tennis player of Indian descent who competed in international level events. He is a former British no.1 player in the singles and a former World no. 2 in the men's doubles. He competed at four Paralympic Games and was a semifinalist in the men's doubles at the 2000 Summer Paralympics.

He was the first British player to win the wheelchair men's doubles title at the 2005 Wimbledon Championships alongside Michaël Jeremiasz and the first British man to win a men's title at the Wimbledon Championships since Fred Perry in 1936, they were runner-ups at the 2006 Wimbledon Championships a year later.

Mistry was born with spina bifida and his left leg shorter than his right. He had his right foot amputated aged twelve and has a prosthetic.
