= Richard Barker (tennis) =

British tennis player

- Full name: Richard Barker
- Country (sports): Great Britain
- Born: 21 March 1981 (age 43); Solihull, England
- Turned pro: 2004
- Retired: 2005
- Prize money: $14,671

Doubles
- Career record: 0–2
- Career titles: 0
- Highest ranking: No. 161 (11 July 2005)

Grand Slam doubles results
- Wimbledon: 1R (2005)

Richard Barker (born 21 March 1981) is a British former professional tennis player.

== Biography ==
Barker was a doubles specialist, often partnering with twin brother William. The brothers were born in the West Midlands town of Solihull and went to King Edward's School in Birmingham. At the age of 12, Barker was the British 12 and Under singles champion, but soon after the twins decided to focus on education and stayed away from tennis for four years. In order to pursue both academia and tennis, they opted to move to the United States and attend Rice University. In their junior year the pair put together a streak of 35 consecutive wins, a run which ended in the semifinals of the NCAA Division I Championships. For their performances that season they were named the ITA's "doubles team of the year". He graduated with a degree in mathematical analysis and began competing professionally in the second half of 2004.

In 2005 the twins were runners-up at the Surbiton Challenger, played in the main draw of the Nottingham Open and competed at the Wimbledon Championships. At Wimbledon they entered the draw as wildcards and were eliminated in the first round by the tournament's top seeds, Jonas Björkman and Max Mirnyi. Straight after his Wimbledon appearance, Barker won a Challenger title at Forest Hills, partnering American Huntley Montgomery, after which he attained his career best ranking of 161. This was however to be his final professional tournament. Both brothers retired from tennis, as they didn't see a future for the doubles format. To counter this, they were the driving force behind a class-action lawsuit which sought an injection to stop the ATP's planned changes to doubles. The lawsuit, which gained support from several high-profile doubles players including the Bryan brothers, was filed in a U.S. District Court in Houston during the 2005 US Open. At the end of the year the ATP announced that the third set would be replaced by a first-to-10 tiebreak while also removing ad-scoring.

He lives with wife Lauren in Houston and is an executive director at J.P. Morgan.

== Challenger titles ==
=== Doubles: (1) ===
No.	Year	Tournament	Surface	Partner	Opponents	Score
1.	2005	Forest Hills, U.S.	Grass	(United States) Huntley Montgomery	(South Africa) Rik de Voest (Australia) Nathan Healey	3–6, 7–5, 7–6^{(6)}
