= Dan Kiernan =

British tennis player

- Full name: Daniel Kiernan
- Country (sports): Great Britain
- Born: 27 March 1980 (age 44); Consett, Durham, England
- Prize money: $30,760

Singles
- Highest ranking: No. 709 (1 March 2004)

Doubles
- Career record: 1–5
- Highest ranking: No. 150 (15 August 2005)

Grand Slam doubles results
- Wimbledon: 2R (2005)

Daniel Kiernan (born 27 March 1980) is a British former professional tennis player.

== Biography ==
Kiernan, who is originally from the town of Consett near Newcastle, played collegiate tennis in the United States for Louisiana State University.

Mostly a doubles player, Kiernan began on the Challenger circuit in 2003 and went on to finish runner-up in four doubles finals during his career.

Kiernan made main draw appearances in ATP Tour tournaments in 2004 at Queen's Club and Nottingham, both with David Sherwood, partnering with the same player to make his Wimbledon debut that year.

In 2005 he reached his best doubles ranking of 150 and made the second round of Wimbledon, when he and James Auckland teamed up to win their first round match over Kevin Kim and Lee Hyung-taik, from two-sets down. Their second round opponents were the second seeded Bryan brothers, who they took a set off before losing in four. He also partnered with Jonathan Marray for his third ATP Tour main draw at the 2005 Nottingham Open, in what was his final year on the professional tour.

Kiernan now runs the SotoTennis Academy in Spain.
