= 2005 Wimbledon Championships =

- Date: 20 June – 3 July 2005
- Edition: 119th
- Category: Grand Slam (ITF)
- Draw: 128S / 64D / 48XD
- Prize money: £10,085,510
- Surface: Grass
- Location: Church Road; SW19, Wimbledon, London, United Kingdom
- Venue: All England Lawn Tennis and Croquet Club

Champions

Men's singles
- (Switzerland) Roger Federer

Women's singles
- (United States) Venus Williams

Men's doubles
- (Australia) Stephen Huss / (South Africa) Wesley Moodie

Women's doubles
- (Zimbabwe) Cara Black / (South Africa) Liezel Huber

Mixed doubles
- (India) Mahesh Bhupathi / (France) Mary Pierce

Wheelchair men's doubles
- (France) Michaël Jeremiasz / (United Kingdom) Jayant Mistry

Boys' singles
- (France) Jérémy Chardy

Girls' singles
- (Poland) Agnieszka Radwańska

Boys' doubles
- (United States) Jesse Levine / (United States) Michael Shabaz

Girls' doubles
- (Belarus) Victoria Azarenka / (Hungary) Ágnes Szávay
| ← 2004 · | Wimbledon Championships | · 2006 → |

The 2005 Wimbledon Championships was a tennis tournament played on grass courts at the All England Lawn Tennis and Croquet Club in Wimbledon, London in the United Kingdom. It was the 119th edition of the Wimbledon Championships and were held from 20 June to 3 July 2005. It was the third Grand Slam tennis event of the year.

Roger Federer successfully defended the men's singles crown defeating Andy Roddick in the final for the second consecutive year. Maria Sharapova was unsuccessful in her 2004 title defence, being defeated in the semifinals by eventual champion Venus Williams. Williams and Lindsay Davenport played the longest women's final in history.

== Point and prize money distribution ==
=== Point distribution ===
Below are the tables with the point distribution for each discipline of the tournament.

==== Senior points ====
| Event | W | F | SF | QF | Round of 16 | Round of 32 | Round of 64 | Round of 128 | Q | Q3 | Q2 | Q1 |
| Men's singles | 1000 | 700 | 450 | 250 | 150 | 75 | 35 | 5 | 12 | 8 | 4 | 0 |
| Men's doubles | 1000 | 700 | 450 | 250 | 150 | 75 | 0 | — | 12 | — | 0 | 0 |
| Women's singles | 650 | 456 | 292 | 162 | 90 | 56 | 32 | 2 | 30 | 21 | 12.5 | 4 |
| Women's doubles | 650 | 456 | 292 | 162 | 90 | 56 | 0 | — | 30 | — | 0 | 0 |

=== Prize distribution ===
The total prize money for 2005 championships was £10,085,510. The winner of the men's title earned £630,000 while the women's singles champion earned £600,000.

| Event | W | F | SF | QF | Round of 16 | Round of 32 | Round of 64 | Round of 128 |
| Men's singles | £630,000 | | | | | | | |
| Women's singles | £600,000 | | | | | | | |
| Men's doubles * | £218,500 | | | | | | | — |
| Women's doubles * | £203,250 | | | | | | | — |
| Mixed doubles * | £90,000 | | | | | | | — |

_{* per team}

== Champions ==
=== Seniors ===
==== Men's singles ====
(Switzerland) Roger Federer defeated (United States) Andy Roddick, 6–2, 7–6^{(7–2)}, 6–4

==== Women's singles ====
(United States) Venus Williams defeated (United States) Lindsay Davenport, 4–6, 7–6^{(7–4)}, 9–7

==== Men's doubles ====
(Australia) Stephen Huss / (South Africa) Wesley Moodie defeated (United States) Bob Bryan / (United States) Mike Bryan, 7–6^{(7–4)}, 6–3, 6–7^{(2–7)}, 6–3

==== Women's doubles ====
(Zimbabwe) Cara Black / (South Africa) Liezel Huber defeated (Russia) Svetlana Kuznetsova / (France) Amélie Mauresmo, 6–2, 6–1

==== Mixed doubles ====
(India) Mahesh Bhupathi / (France) Mary Pierce defeated (Australia) Paul Hanley / (Ukraine) Tatiana Perebiynis, 6–4, 6–2

=== Juniors ===
==== Boys' singles ====
(France) Jérémy Chardy defeated (Netherlands) Robin Haase, 6–4, 6–3

==== Girls' singles ====
(Poland) Agnieszka Radwańska defeated (Austria) Tamira Paszek, 6–3, 6–4

==== Boys' doubles ====
(United States) Jesse Levine / (United States) Michael Shabaz defeated (Australia) Sam Groth / (United Kingdom) Andrew Kennaugh, 6–4, 6–1

==== Girls' doubles ====
(Belarus) Victoria Azarenka / (Hungary) Ágnes Szávay defeated (New Zealand) Marina Erakovic / (Romania) Monica Niculescu, 6–7^{(5–7)}, 6–2, 6–0

=== Other events ===
==== Wheelchair men's doubles ====
(France) Michaël Jeremiasz / (United Kingdom) Jayant Mistry defeated (Australia) David Hall / (Austria) Martin Legner, 4–6, 6–3, 7–6

== Singles seeds ==
=== Men's singles ===
1. (Switzerland) Roger Federer (champion)
2. (United States) Andy Roddick (final, lost to Roger Federer)
3. (Australia) Lleyton Hewitt (semifinals, lost to Roger Federer)
4. (Spain) Rafael Nadal (second round, lost to Gilles Müller)
5. (Russia) Marat Safin (third round, lost to Feliciano López)
6. (United Kingdom) Tim Henman (second round, lost to Dmitry Tursunov)
7. (Argentina) Guillermo Cañas (withdrew)
8. (Russia) Nikolay Davydenko (second round, lost to Jonas Björkman)
9. (France) Sébastien Grosjean (quarterfinals, lost to Andy Roddick)
10. (Croatia) Mario Ančić (fourth round, lost to Feliciano López)
11. (Sweden) Joachim Johansson (third round, lost to Fernando González)
12. (Sweden) Thomas Johansson (semifinals, lost to Andy Roddick)
13. (Spain) Tommy Robredo (first round, lost to Fernando Verdasco)
14. (Czech Republic) Radek Štěpánek (second round, lost to Andy Murray)
15. (Argentina) Guillermo Coria (fourth round, lost to Roger Federer)
16. (Argentina) Mariano Puerta (first round, lost to Lars Burgsmüller)
17. (Spain) David Ferrer (first round, lost to Guillermo García López)
18. (Argentina) David Nalbandian (quarterfinals, lost to Thomas Johansson)
19. (Germany) Tommy Haas (first round, lost to Janko Tipsarević)
20. (Croatia) Ivan Ljubičić (first round, lost to Jürgen Melzer)
21. (Chile) Fernando González (quarterfinals, lost to Roger Federer)
22. (Slovakia) Dominik Hrbatý (second round, lost to Gaël Monfils)
23. (Spain) Juan Carlos Ferrero (fourth round, lost to Roger Federer)
24. (United States) Taylor Dent (fourth round, lost to Lleyton Hewitt)
25. (Germany) Nicolas Kiefer (third round, lost to Roger Federer)
26. (Spain) Feliciano López (quarterfinals, lost to Lleyton Hewitt)
27. (France) Richard Gasquet (fourth round, lost to David Nalbandian)
28. (Czech Republic) Jiří Novák (third round, lost to Max Mirnyi)
29. (Chile) Nicolás Massú (second round, lost to Justin Gimelstob)
30. (Sweden) Robin Söderling (first round, lost to Igor Andreev)
31. (Russia) Mikhail Youzhny (fourth round, lost to Fernando González)
32. (Italy) Filippo Volandri (first round, lost to Wayne Arthurs)
33. (Belgium) Olivier Rochus (second round, lost to Max Mirnyi)

=== Women's singles ===
1. (United States) Lindsay Davenport (final, lost to Venus Williams)
2. (Russia) Maria Sharapova (semifinals, lost to Venus Williams)
3. (France) Amélie Mauresmo (semifinals, lost to Lindsay Davenport)
4. (United States) Serena Williams (third round, lost to Jill Craybas)
5. (Russia) Svetlana Kuznetsova (quarterfinals, lost to Lindsay Davenport)
6. (Russia) Elena Dementieva (fourth round, lost to Anastasia Myskina)
7. (Belgium) Justine Henin-Hardenne (first round, lost to Eleni Daniilidou)
8. (Russia) Nadia Petrova (quarterfinals, lost to Maria Sharapova)
9. (Russia) Anastasia Myskina (quarterfinals, lost to Amélie Mauresmo)
10. (Switzerland) Patty Schnyder (first round, lost to Antonella Serra Zanetti)
11. (Russia) Vera Zvonareva (second round, lost to Květa Peschke)
12. (France) Mary Pierce (quarterfinals, lost to Venus Williams)
13. (Russia) Elena Likhovtseva (fourth round, lost to Amélie Mauresmo)
14. (United States) Venus Williams (champion)
15. (Belgium) Kim Clijsters (fourth round, lost to Lindsay Davenport)
16. (France) Nathalie Dechy (fourth round, lost to Maria Sharapova)
17. (Serbia and Montenegro) Jelena Janković (third round, lost to Anastasia Myskina)
18. (France) Tatiana Golovin (first round, lost to Alona Bondarenko)
19. (Serbia and Montenegro) Ana Ivanovic (third round, lost to Mary Pierce)
20. (Slovakia) Daniela Hantuchová (third round, lost to Venus Williams)
21. (Italy) Francesca Schiavone (first round, lost to Kristina Brandi)
22. (Italy) Silvia Farina Elia (third round, lost to Elena Likhovtseva)
23. (Japan) Ai Sugiyama (first round, lost to Roberta Vinci)
24. (Japan) Shinobu Asagoe (first round, lost to Magdalena Maleeva)
25. (Croatia) Karolina Šprem (first round, lost to Tamarine Tanasugarn)
26. (Italy) Flavia Pennetta (fourth round, lost to Mary Pierce)
27. (Czech Republic) Nicole Vaidišová (third round, lost to Svetlana Kuznetsova)
28. (United States) Amy Frazier (first round, lost to Mashona Washington)
29. (France) Marion Bartoli (second round, lost to Rika Fujiwara)
30. (Russia) Dinara Safina (third round, lost to Lindsay Davenport)
31. (Spain) Anabel Medina Garrigues (first round, lost to Katarina Srebotnik)
32. (France) Virginie Razzano (second round, lost to Cara Black)

== Main draw wild card entries ==
The following players received wild cards into the main draw senior events.

Men's singles

1. (United States) James Blake
2. (United Kingdom) Alex Bogdanovic
3. (United Kingdom) Josh Goodall
4. (United Kingdom) Alan Mackin
5. (United Kingdom) Jonathan Marray
6. (United Kingdom) Andy Murray
7. (Australia) Mark Philippoussis
8. (United Kingdom) David Sherwood

Women's singles

1. (United Kingdom) Elena Baltacha
2. (Zimbabwe) Cara Black
3. (United Kingdom) Sarah Borwell
4. (United Kingdom) Amanda Janes
5. (United Kingdom) Anne Keothavong
6. (United Kingdom) Rebecca Llewellyn
7. (United Kingdom) Katie O'Brien
8. (United Kingdom) Jane O'Donoghue

Men's doubles

1. (United Kingdom) James Auckland / (United Kingdom) Dan Kiernan
2. (United Kingdom) Andrew Banks / (United Kingdom) Alan Mackin
3. (United Kingdom) Richard Barker / (United Kingdom) William Barker
4. (United Kingdom) Alex Bogdanovic / (United Kingdom) Josh Goodall
5. (United Kingdom) Mark Hilton / (United Kingdom) Jonathan Marray
6. (United Kingdom) Andy Murray / (United Kingdom) David Sherwood

Women's doubles

1. (United Kingdom) Elena Baltacha / (United Kingdom) Jane O'Donoghue
2. (United Kingdom) Sarah Borwell / (United Kingdom) Emily Webley-Smith
3. (United Kingdom) Claire Curran / (South Africa) Natalie Grandin
4. (United Kingdom) Anna Hawkins / (United Kingdom) Rebecca Llewellyn
5. (United Kingdom) Amanda Janes / (United Kingdom) Anne Keothavong
6. (United Kingdom) Katie O'Brien / (United Kingdom) Melanie South

Mixed doubles

1. (United Kingdom) Jamie Baker / (United Kingdom) Claire Curran
2. (United Kingdom) Jamie Delgado / (United Kingdom) Amanda Janes
3. (United Kingdom) Andy Murray / (Israel) Shahar Pe'er
4. (United Kingdom) Arvind Parmar / (United Kingdom) Jane O'Donoghue
5. (United Kingdom) David Sherwood / (United Kingdom) Elena Baltacha

== Qualifier entries ==
=== Men's singles ===
1. (Italy) Andreas Seppi
2. (France) Arnaud Clément
3. (Switzerland) George Bastl
4. (United Kingdom) Jamie Delgado
5. (United States) Jeff Morrison
6. (France) Antony Dupuis
7. (Thailand) Danai Udomchoke
8. (Belgium) Gilles Elseneer
9. (Croatia) Roko Karanušić
10. (Belgium) Dick Norman
11. (Chile) Adrián García
12. (Chinese Taipei) Lu Yen-hsun
13. (Israel) Noam Okun
14. (Finland) Tuomas Ketola
15. (Serbia and Montenegro) Novak Djokovic
16. (Germany) Tobias Summerer

The following players received entry into the lucky loser spot:

1. (United States) Justin Gimelstob
2. (Italy) Daniele Bracciali
3. (United States) Paul Goldstein

=== Women's singles ===
1. (Czech Republic) Kateřina Böhmová
2. (Sweden) Sofia Arvidsson
3. (United States) Ashley Harkleroad
4. (Belgium) Els Callens
5. (United States) Jamea Jackson
6. (United States) Meilen Tu
7. (Japan) Saori Obata
8. (Italy) Mara Santangelo
9. (Germany) Sabine Klaschka
10. (Ukraine) Kateryna Bondarenko
11. (Ukraine) Julia Vakulenko
12. (Belarus) Tatiana Poutchek

The following players received entry into the lucky loser spot:

1. (Czech Republic) Eva Birnerová
2. (France) Séverine Beltrame
3. (Hungary) Melinda Czink

=== Men's doubles ===
1. (Finland) Tuomas Ketola / (Canada) Frédéric Niemeyer
2. (Paraguay) Ramón Delgado / (Brazil) André Sá
3. (Sweden) Robert Lindstedt / (Austria) Alexander Peya
4. (Australia) Stephen Huss / (South Africa) Wesley Moodie (champions)

The following teams received entry into the lucky loser spot:

1. (Czech Republic) Lukáš Dlouhý / (Czech Republic) David Škoch
2. (United Kingdom) Ross Hutchins / (United Kingdom) Martin Lee

=== Women's doubles ===
1. (Australia) Evie Dominikovic / (Japan) Aiko Nakamura
2. (Ukraine) Alona Bondarenko / (Russia) Anastasia Rodionova
3. (Japan) Rika Fujiwara / (Japan) Saori Obata
4. (Belarus) Tatiana Poutchek / (Belarus) Anastasiya Yakimova

The following teams received entry into the lucky loser spot:

1. (Ukraine) Yuliana Fedak / (United States) Lilia Osterloh
2. (Argentina) Erica Krauth / (Canada) Marie-Ève Pelletier
3. (Romania) Edina Gallovits / (United States) Angela Haynes

== Withdrawals ==
Men's Singles

- (United States) Andre Agassi → replaced by (United States) Justin Gimelstob
- (Argentina) Guillermo Cañas → replaced by (United States) Paul Goldstein
- (Argentina) Juan Ignacio Chela → replaced by (Sweden) Thomas Enqvist
- (Spain) Albert Costa → replaced by (Australia) Scott Draper
- (United States) Mardy Fish → replaced by (Spain) Albert Montañés
- (Argentina) Gastón Gaudio → replaced by (Serbia and Montenegro) Janko Tipsarević
- (Argentina) Edgardo Massa → replaced by (Germany) Björn Phau
- (Spain) Carlos Moyá → replaced by (Czech Republic) Bohdan Ulihrach
- (Netherlands) Sjeng Schalken → replaced by (Italy) Daniele Bracciali
- (Argentina) Mariano Zabaleta → replaced by (Czech Republic) Ivo Minář

Women's Singles

- (Russia) Elena Bovina → replaced by (Czech Republic) Eva Birnerová
- (Australia) Alicia Molik → replaced by (Hungary) Melinda Czink
- (Argentina) Paola Suárez → replaced by (France) Séverine Beltrame

| Preceded by 2005 French Open | Grand Slams | Succeeded by 2005 US Open |
