= Amanda Keen =

English tennis player

- Full name: Amanda Janes Keen
- Country (sports): United Kingdom
- Born: 15 January 1978 (age 47)
- Turned pro: 2000
- Retired: 2007
- Prize money: $137,563

Singles
- Career record: 157–162
- Career titles: 0 WTA, 4 ITF
- Highest ranking: No. 207 (19 March 2007)

Grand Slam singles results
- Wimbledon: 1R (2004, 2005)

Doubles
- Career record: 28–54
- Career titles: 0 WTA, 1 ITF
- Highest ranking: No. 294 (6 June 2005)

Grand Slam doubles results
- Wimbledon: 1R (2003, 2005, 2006)

Grand Slam mixed doubles results
- Wimbledon: 2R (2004)
Medal record
Representing Great Britain
Women's Tennis
Summer Universiade
Bronze medal – third place	2001 Beijing	Women's Singles

Amanda Janes Keen (born 15 January 1978) is a former English tennis player who competed on the WTA Tour. She twice competed at Wimbledon and had a career-best ranking of no. 207.

Keen is the daughter of Christine Truman, winner of the 1959 French Open. Since her retirement from the tennis tour, she has been a coach and also teaches English at a high school.

== ITF finals ==
=== Singles (4–2) ===
$25,000 tournaments
$10,000 tournaments

Outcome	No.	Date	Tournament	Surface	Opponent	Score
Winner	1.	20 January 2003	Hull, United Kingdom	Hard (i)	(Russia) Anna Bastrikova	6–3, 6–1
Winner	2.	7 March 2004	Buchen, Germany	Hard	(Czech Republic) Eva Hrdinová	6–3, 6-2
Winner	3.	11 July 2004	Felixstowe, United Kingdom	Grass	(Serbia and Montenegro) Teodora Mirčić	6–2, 6–1
Winner	4.	9 April 2006	Bath, United Kingdom	Hard (i)	(Netherlands) Nicole Thyssen	6–3, 6–0
Runner-up	5.	13 May 2006	Monzón, Spain	Hard	(United States) Diana Ospina	4–6, 2–6
Runner-up	6.	26 September 2006	Nottingham, United Kingdom	Hard	(United Kingdom) Katie O'Brien	7–5, 6–7^{(3)}, 4–6

=== Doubles (1–0) ===
Outcome	No.	Date	Tournament	Surface	Partner	Opponents	Score
Winner	1.	21 May 2005	Tenerife, Spain	Hard	(United Kingdom) Anne Keothavong	(Germany) Julia Babilon (Germany) Adriana Barna	7–6^{(5)}, 3–6, 6–3
