= David Sherwood =

British tennis player and coach

- Full name: David Sherwood
- Country (sports): (United Kingdom) Great Britain
- Residence: Sheffield, England
- Born: 6 May 1980 (age 46) Sheffield, England
- Height: 6 ft 4 in (1.93 m)
- Turned pro: 1998
- Retired: 21 January 2008
- Plays: Right-handed
- Prize money: $126,338

Singles
- Career record: 1–3
- Career titles: 0
- Highest ranking: No. 214 (25 July 2005)

Grand Slam singles results
- Wimbledon: 2R (2005)
- US Open: Q1 (2005)

Doubles
- Career record: 2–10
- Career titles: 0
- Highest ranking: No. 174 (1 December 2003)

Grand Slam doubles results
- Wimbledon: 1R (1999, 2002, 2003, 2004, 2005)

Grand Slam mixed doubles results
- Wimbledon: 1R (2002, 2003, 2004, 2005)

Team competitions
- Davis Cup: World Group Play-Off (2005)
- Last updated on: 16 October 2021.

David Sherwood is a British tennis coach and retired tennis player. In his only live Davis Cup match, Sherwood played doubles with Andy Murray beating the Israeli World No 4 doubles team of Jonathan Erlich and Andy Ram,

== Early and personal life ==
Sherwood is the son of Sheila Sherwood who won a silver medal in the long jump at the 1968 Summer Olympics in Mexico City and John Sherwood, who won a bronze medal in the 400m hurdles, and at the same Olympics.

== Career ==
In 1997 he won the Australian Open boys' doubles title with fellow Brit James Trotman. They defeated South African pairing Jaco van der Westhuizen and Wesley Whitehouse 7–6, 6–3 in the final.

Sherwood, won futures tournaments in Wrexham and Edinburgh, and also reached the semi-final in Mulhouse and the final in Plaisir, France.

By 2003, Sherwood had acquired a reputation for a lackadaisical attitude, a party loving life style and negatively influencing younger players. While at a Jamaica Futures event in November 2003, Sherwood delivered an on-court barrage at his Lawn Tennis Association coach. Back in the UK, he missed a training session claiming he was ill, despite living five minutes away from the LTA's headquarters with an on-site doctor. Next day, the LTA's team manager Mark Petchey expelled him from the LTA.

With the support of his parents, Sherwood put his tennis career back on track. By November 2004, Mark Petchey was funding his coaching throughout the winter.

In March 2005 Sherwood played doubles with Andy Murray in their joint Davis Cup debuts for the Europe/Africa Zone Group I match against Israel. Surprisingly, Sherwood/Murray beat the World No 4 doubles team of Jonathan Erlich and Andy Ram, to help Great Britain win 3–2. He entered the singles at Wimbledon in 2005, and defeated Ricardo Mello in the first round before losing to Feliciano López.

In September 2005, at the World Group Play-off against Switzerland, Sherwood was beaten in the first singles dead rubber, with Great Britain losing 5–0.

Since retiring from playing in 2008, Sherwood became a nationally recognised Lawn Tennis Association coach, coaching many prominent players in the country.

== ATP Challenger and ITF Futures finals ==
=== Singles: 9 (3–6) ===
Legend ATP Challenger (0–0) ITF Futures (3–6)	Finals by surface Hard (3–6) Clay (0–0) Grass (0–0) Carpet (0–0)

Result	W–L	Date	Tournament	Tier	Surface	Opponent	Score
Loss	0–1	Mar 2002	India F1, Chennai	Futures	Hard	(Slovakia) Branislav Sekáč	6–7^{(3–7)}, 3–6
Loss	0–2	Sep 2002	Great Britain F8, Sunderland	Futures	Hard	(United Kingdom) Mark Hilton	3–6, 5–7
Win	1–2	Oct 2003	Great Britain F11, Edinburgh	Futures	Hard	(United Kingdom) Mark Hilton	6–4, 6–3
Win	2–2	Aug 2004	Great Britain F3, Wrexham	Futures	Hard	(United Kingdom) Mark Hilton	7–6^{(7–5)}, 6–4
Loss	2–3	Sep 2004	France F15, Plaisir	Futures	Hard	(France) Julien Varlet	3–6, 4–6
Win	3–3	Oct 2004	Great Britain F5, Edinburgh	Futures	Hard	(United Kingdom) Tom Burn	6–4, 6–1
Loss	3–4	Oct 2004	Great Britain F6, Glasgow	Futures	Hard	(United Kingdom) Richard Bloomfield	7–6^{(7–4)}, 2–6, 6–7^{(6–8)}
Loss	3–5	Oct 2004	Great Britain F7, Sunderland	Futures	Hard	(Germany) Alexander Flock	2–6, 3–6
Loss	3–6	Jan 2005	India F1, Mumbai	Futures	Hard	(Germany) Simon Greul	6–4, 3–6, 2–6

=== Doubles: 31 (16–15) ===
Legend ATP Challenger (0–2) ITF Futures (16–13)	Finals by surface Hard (16–11) Clay (0–1) Grass (0–2) Carpet (0–1)

Result	W–L	Date	Tournament	Tier	Surface	Partner	Opponents	Score
Win	1–0	Oct 1998	Great Britain F8, Glasgow	Futures	Hard	(United Kingdom) James Davidson	(United Kingdom) Ross Matheson (United Kingdom) Tom Spinks	6–4, 5–7, 6–4
Loss	1–1	Oct 1998	Great Britain F10, Edinburgh	Futures	Hard	(United Kingdom) James Davidson	(Australia) Ashley Naumann (United States) Andrew Rueb	3–6, 2–6
Loss	1–2	Feb 1999	Great Britain F2, Chigwell	Futures	Carpet	(United Kingdom) Tom Spinks	(Czech Republic) Leoš Friedl (Slovenia) Borut Urh	6–7, 1–6
Loss	1–3	Aug 2000	Great Britain F7, Hampstead	Futures	Hard	(United Kingdom) Simon Dickson	(United Kingdom) James Davidson (United Kingdom) Oliver Freelove	2–4, 1–4, 0–4
Win	2–3	Mar 2002	India F1, Chennai	Futures	Hard	(United Kingdom) Jonathan Marray	(India) Rohan Bopanna (India) Vijay Kannan	3–6, 7–6^{(8–6)}, 7–6^{(10–8)}
Loss	2–4	May 2002	Jamaica F4, Montego Bay	Futures	Hard	(United Kingdom) Jonathan Marray	(Greece) Konstantinos Economidis (Greece) Nikos Rovas	4–6, 2–6
Win	3–4	May 2002	Jamaica F6, Montego Bay	Futures	Hard	(United Kingdom) Jonathan Marray	(Canada) Simon Larose (United States) Kiantki Thomas	4–6, 2–1 ret.
Loss	3–5	Sep 2002	Great Britain F7, Glasgow	Futures	Hard	(United Kingdom) Jonathan Marray	(Australia) Luke Bourgeois (Australia) Alun Jones	1–6, 2–6
Win	4–5	Sep 2002	Great Britain F8, Sunderland	Futures	Hard	(United Kingdom) Jonathan Marray	(Austria) Johannes Ager (United Kingdom) Alan Mackin	7–6^{(7–2)}, 4–6, 6–4
Loss	4–6	Oct 2002	Great Britain F9, Edinburgh	Futures	Hard	(United Kingdom) Jonathan Marray	(Czech Republic) Jakub Hasek (South Africa) Wesley Moodie	3–6, 6–3, 3–6
Loss	4–7	Nov 2002	USA F28, Costa Mesa	Futures	Hard	(United Kingdom) Richard Bloomfield	(United States) Prakash Amritraj (United States) Rajeev Ram	2–6, 0–3 ret
Win	5–7	Feb 2003	Great Britain F3, Southampton	Futures	Hard	(United Kingdom) Jonathan Marray	(Japan) Satoshi Iwabuchi (Japan) Michihisa Onoda	6–3, 7–5
Loss	5–8	Apr 2003	Qatar F1, Doha	Futures	Hard	(United Kingdom) Jonathan Marray	(France) Benjamin Cassaigne (Netherlands) Rogier Wassen	6–3, 6–7^{(6–8)}, 3–6
Win	6–8	Apr 2003	Qatar F2, Doha	Futures	Hard	(United Kingdom) Jonathan Marray	(Germany) Ivo Klec (Pakistan) Aisam Qureshi	3–6, 6–2, 7–6^{(7–3)}
Loss	6–9	Jul 2003	Bristol, United Kingdom	Challenger	Grass	(United Kingdom) Daniel Kiernan	(France) Jean-François Bachelot (France) Nicolas Mahut	6–7^{(4–7)}, 7–5, 6–7^{(5–7)}
Loss	6–10	Jul 2003	Manchester, United Kingdom	Challenger	Grass	(United Kingdom) Daniel Kiernan	(United Kingdom) Arvind Parmar (United Kingdom) Martin Lee	3–6, 6–2, 2–6
Win	7–10	Aug 2003	Great Britain F8, London	Futures	Hard	(United Kingdom) Daniel Kiernan	(United Kingdom) Jonathan Marray (United Kingdom) Jamie Delgado	walkover
Loss	7–11	Sep 2003	Great Britain F9, Sunderland	Futures	Hard	(United Kingdom) Daniel Kiernan	(United Kingdom) Jonathan Marray (United Kingdom) Mark Hilton	3–6, 3–6
Win	8–11	Sep 2003	Great Britain F10, Glasgow	Futures	Hard	(United Kingdom) Daniel Kiernan	(United Kingdom) Andy Murray (United Kingdom) Guy Thomas	6–7^{(2–7)}, 6–0, 6–0
Win	9–11	Oct 2003	Great Britain F11, Edinburgh	Futures	Hard	(United Kingdom) Daniel Kiernan	(United Kingdom) Aidan Graveson (United Kingdom) Thomas Greenland	6–2, 6–3
Win	10–11	Oct 2003	Jamaica F10, Montego Bay	Futures	Hard	(United Kingdom) Daniel Kiernan	(Hungary) György Balázs (Hungary) László Fonó	7–6^{(7–5)}, 6–2
Win	11–11	Oct 2003	Jamaica F11, Montego Bay	Futures	Hard	(United Kingdom) Daniel Kiernan	(Jamaica) Dustin Brown (Jamaica) Ryan Russell	6–4, 2–0 ret.
Win	12–11	Nov 2003	Jamaica F12, Montego Bay	Futures	Hard	(United Kingdom) Daniel Kiernan	(United Kingdom) Jonathan Marray (United Kingdom) Mark Hilton	6–3, 6–4
Loss	12–12	May 2004	Great Britain F1, Bournemouth	Futures	Clay	(United Kingdom) Oliver Freelove	(United Kingdom) James Auckland (United States) Thomas Blake	4–6, 3–6
Win	13–12	Sep 2004	France F14, Mulhouse	Futures	Hard	(United Kingdom) Jonathan Marray	(France) Josselin Ouanna (France) Alexandre Sidorenko	6–2, 6–1
Win	14–12	Oct 2004	Great Britain F6, Glasgow	Futures	Hard	(United Kingdom) Daniel Kiernan	(United Kingdom) Richard Bloomfield (United Kingdom) Chris Lewis	6–4, 6–4
Win	15–12	Oct 2004	Great Britain F7, Sunderland	Futures	Hard	(United Kingdom) Daniel Kiernan	(United Kingdom) Josh Goodall (United Kingdom) Miles Kasiri	6–4, 6–4
Win	16–12	Mar 2005	France F4, Lille	Futures	Hard	(India) Mustafa Ghouse	(France) Patrice Atias (France) Frederic Jeanclaude	6–4, 6–7^{(4–7)}, 7–6^{(7–3)}
Loss	16–13	Oct 2005	France F16, Nevers	Futures	Hard	(United Kingdom) Kyle Spencer	(France) Julien Jeanpierre (France) Jean-Michel Pequery	4–6, 7–6^{(9–7)}, 5–7
Loss	16–14	Nov 2005	Belgium F1, Sint-Katelijne-Waver	Futures	Hard	(United Kingdom) Richard Bloomfield	(Russia) Kirill Ivanov-Smolensky (Russia) Denis Matsukevich	5–7, 2–6
Loss	16–15	Mar 2006	Great Britain F4, Manchester	Futures	Hard	(United Kingdom) Martin Lee	(France) Jean-François Bachelot (Pakistan) Aisam Qureshi	1–6, 6–3, 2–6

== Junior Grand Slam finals ==
=== Doubles: 1 (1 title) ===
Result	Year	Tournament	Surface	Partnet	Opponents	Score
Win	1997	Australian Open	Hard	(United Kingdom) James Trotman	(South Africa) Jaco Van Der Westhuizen (South Africa) Wesley Whitehouse	7–6, 6–3
