= 2005 Wimbledon Championships – Women's singles =

Women's singles
- 2005 Wimbledon Championships

Final
- Champion: (United States) Venus Williams
- Runner-up: (United States) Lindsay Davenport
- Score: 4–6, 7–6^{(7–4)}, 9–7

Details
- Draw: 128 (12Q / 8WC)
- Seeds: 32

Events
Singles	men	women		boys	girls
Doubles	men	women	mixed	boys	girls
WC Singles	men	women	quad
WC Doubles	men	women	quad
Legends	men	women	seniors
- Wimbledon Championships

Venus Williams defeated Lindsay Davenport in the final, 4–6, 7–6^{(7–4)}, 9–7 to win the ladies' singles tennis title at the 2005 Wimbledon Championships. It was her third Wimbledon singles title and fifth major singles title overall. At two hours and 45 minutes, it was the longest Wimbledon women's final in history. Williams was the first woman in the Open Era, and the first since Helen Wills in 1935, to win the title after being championship point down. The final was a rematch of the 2000 final.

Maria Sharapova was the defending champion, but lost to Williams in the semifinals.

The first week of the tournament was headlined by two major upsets. Justine Henin-Hardenne's first round defeat marked the first time in the Open Era that the reigning French Open champion lost her opening match at Wimbledon, while Serena Williams' loss in the third round was her earliest exit at any major since the 1999 French Open.

== Seeds ==
1. (United States) Lindsay Davenport (final)
2. (Russia) Maria Sharapova (semifinals)
3. (France) Amélie Mauresmo (semifinals)
4. (United States) Serena Williams (third round)
5. (Russia) Svetlana Kuznetsova (quarterfinals)
6. (Russia) Elena Dementieva (fourth round)
7. (Belgium) Justine Henin-Hardenne (first round)
8. (Russia) Nadia Petrova (quarterfinals)
9. (Russia) Anastasia Myskina (quarterfinals)
10. (Switzerland) Patty Schnyder (first round)
11. (Russia) Vera Zvonareva (second round)
12. (France) Mary Pierce (quarterfinals)
13. (Russia) Elena Likhovtseva (fourth round)
14. (United States) Venus Williams (champion)
15. (Belgium) Kim Clijsters (fourth round)
16. (France) Nathalie Dechy (fourth round)

17. (Serbia and Montenegro) Jelena Janković (third round)
18. (France) Tatiana Golovin (first round)
19. (Serbia and Montenegro) Ana Ivanovic (third round)
20. (Slovakia) Daniela Hantuchová (third round)
21. (Italy) Francesca Schiavone (first round)
22. (Italy) Silvia Farina Elia (third round)
23. (Japan) Ai Sugiyama (first round)
24. (Japan) Shinobu Asagoe (first round)
25. (Croatia) Karolina Šprem (first round)
26. (Italy) Flavia Pennetta (fourth round)
27. (Czech Republic) Nicole Vaidišová (third round)
28. (United States) Amy Frazier (first round)
29. (France) Marion Bartoli (second round)
30. (Russia) Dinara Safina (third round)
31. (Spain) Anabel Medina Garrigues (first round)
32. (France) Virginie Razzano (second round)

Click on the seed number of a player to go to their draw section.

== Draw ==
Key

- Q = Qualifier
- WC = Wild card
- LL = Lucky loser
- Alt = Alternate
- ITF = ITF entry
- PR = Protected ranking
- SR = Special ranking
- SE = Special exempt
- JE = Junior exempt
- JR = Junior Accelerator Programme entrant
- CO = College Accelerator Programme entrant
- NG = Next Gen Accelerator Program entrant
- w/o = Walkover
- r = Retired
- d = Defaulted

=== Finals ===
Quarterfinals
1	(United States) Lindsay Davenport	7^{7}	6
5	(Russia) Svetlana Kuznetsova	6^{1}	3
3	(France) Amélie Mauresmo	6	6
9	(Russia) Anastasia Myskina	3	4
12	(France) Mary Pierce	0	6^{10}
14	(United States) Venus Williams	6	7^{12}
8	(Russia) Nadia Petrova	6^{6}	3
2	(Russia) Maria Sharapova	7^{8}	6

Semifinals
1	(United States) Lindsay Davenport	6^{5}	7^{7}	6
3	(France) Amélie Mauresmo	7^{7}	6^{4}	4
14	(United States) Venus Williams	7^{7}	6
2	(Russia) Maria Sharapova	6^{2}	1

Final
1	(United States) Lindsay Davenport	6	6^{4}	7
14	(United States) Venus Williams	4	7^{7}	9

=== Top half ===
==== Section 1 ====
First round
1	(United States) L Davenport	6	6
(Russia) A Jidkova	0	2
(Spain) M Marrero	2	3
Q	(United States) J Jackson	6	6
(Czech Republic) B Strýcová	6	7
(United States) L Osterloh	3	5
(Croatia) S Mamić	3	4
30	(Russia) D Safina	6	6
23	(Japan) A Sugiyama	2	6	4
(Italy) R Vinci	6	2	6
(United States) A Spears	0	6	2
(Luxembourg) A Kremer	6	2	6
(United States) M Irvin	7^{7}	6
Q	(Japan) S Obata	6^{4}	3
WC	(United Kingdom) K O'Brien	2	3
15	(Belgium) K Clijsters	6	6

Second round
1	(United States) L Davenport	6	6
Q	(United States) J Jackson	0	3
(Czech Republic) B Strýcová	2	2
30	(Russia) D Safina	6	6
(Italy) R Vinci	6	6
(Luxembourg) A Kremer	3	2
(United States) M Irvin	1	1
15	(Belgium) K Clijsters	6	6

Third round
1	(United States) L Davenport	6	6
30	(Russia) D Safina	2	1
(Italy) R Vinci	3	4
15	(Belgium) K Clijsters	6	6

Fourth round
1	(United States) L Davenport	6	6^{4}	6
15	(Belgium) K Clijsters	3	7^{7}	3

==== Section 2 ====
First round
10	(Switzerland) P Schnyder	4	7^{9}	3
(Italy) A Serra Zanetti	6	6^{7}	6
(Ukraine) T Perebiynis	3	6^{5}
Q	(Sweden) S Arvidsson	6	7^{7}
(Russia) M Kirilenko	6	7^{7}
Q	(Belgium) E Callens	2	6^{3}
(Bulgaria) M Maleeva	6	7^{8}
24	(Japan) S Asagoe	2	6^{6}
27	(Czech Republic) N Vaidišová	6	3	6
(Croatia) J Kostanić	3	6	3
(Australia) S Stosur	6^{1}	4
(Czech Republic) M Paštiková	7^{7}	6
(Japan) A Morigami	3	6	6
(India) S Mirza	6	3	8
WC	(United Kingdom) R Llewellyn	0	1
5	(Russia) S Kuznetsova	6	6

Second round
(Italy) A Serra Zanetti	7	2	7
Q	(Sweden) S Arvidsson	5	6	5
(Russia) M Kirilenko	2	3
(Bulgaria) M Maleeva	6	6
27	(Czech Republic) N Vaidišová	7	6
(Czech Republic) M Paštiková	5	3
(India) S Mirza	4	7^{7}	4
5	(Russia) S Kuznetsova	6	6^{4}	6

Third round
(Italy) A Serra Zanetti	3	2
(Bulgaria) M Maleeva	6	6
27	(Czech Republic) N Vaidišová	5	7^{7}	2
5	(Russia) S Kuznetsova	7	6^{5}	6

Fourth round
(Bulgaria) M Maleeva	4	3
5	(Russia) S Kuznetsova	6	6

==== Section 3 ====
First round
3	(France) A Mauresmo	6	6
LL	(Hungary) M Czink	3	2
(Spain) M Sánchez Lorenzo	6	4	6
(Poland) M Domachowska	4	6	2
WC	(United Kingdom) S Borwell	6^{11}	3
(United States) S Perry	7^{13}	6
(Thailand) T Tanasugarn	6	6
25	(Croatia) K Šprem	2	2
22	(Italy) S Farina Elia	6	6
(Slovakia) M Suchá	4	2
(Venezuela) M Vento-Kabchi	7^{7}	4	6
(Venezuela) M Sequera	6^{1}	6	4
(United States) M Shaughnessy	6	1	6
(Germany) J Schruff	1	6	2
(Israel) A Smashnova	2	2
13	(Russia) E Likhovtseva	6	6

Second round
3	(France) A Mauresmo	6	6
(Spain) M Sánchez Lorenzo	1	3
(United States) S Perry	7^{7}	6
(Thailand) T Tanasugarn	6^{1}	2
22	(Italy) S Farina Elia	6	5	6
(Venezuela) M Vento-Kabchi	1	7	3
(United States) M Shaughnessy	3	6^{4}
13	(Russia) E Likhovtseva	6	7^{7}

Third round
3	(France) A Mauresmo	6	6
(United States) S Perry	0	2
22	(Italy) S Farina Elia	7	4	4
13	(Russia) E Likhovtseva	5	6	6

Fourth round
3	(France) A Mauresmo	6	6
13	(Russia) E Likhovtseva	4	0

==== Section 4 ====
First round
9	(Russia) A Myskina	5	7^{7}	6
Q	(Czech Republic) K Böhmová	7	6^{4}	4
(Australia) E Dominikovic	7	3	4
(Japan) A Nakamura	5	6	6
(Argentina) M Díaz Oliva	6	6
WC	(United Kingdom) A Keothavong	3	4
(Russia) A Chakvetadze	4	2
17	(Serbia and Montenegro) J Janković	6	6
28	(United States) A Frazier	4	6	4
(United States) M Washington	6	4	6
(Tunisia) S Sfar	6	4	9
(France) É Loit	2	6	7
WC	(United Kingdom) E Baltacha	3	2
Q	(Germany) S Klaschka	6	6
(Czech Republic) I Benešová	2	3
6	(Russia) E Dementieva	6	6

Second round
9	(Russia) A Myskina	6	6
(Japan) A Nakamura	4	3
(Argentina) M Díaz Oliva	3	5
17	(Serbia and Montenegro) J Janković	6	7
(United States) M Washington	6	3	6
(Tunisia) S Sfar	3	6	3
Q	(Germany) S Klaschka	6	3	6
6	(Russia) E Dementieva	2	6	8

Third round
9	(Russia) A Myskina	6	5	10
17	(Serbia and Montenegro) J Janković	0	7	8
(United States) M Washington	5	1
6	(Russia) E Dementieva	7	6

Fourth round
9	(Russia) A Myskina	1	7^{11}	7
6	(Russia) E Dementieva	6	6^{9}	5

=== Bottom half ===
==== Section 5 ====
First round
7	(Belgium) J Henin-Hardenne	6^{6}	6	5
(Greece) E Daniilidou	7^{8}	2	7
(Czech Republic) K Koukalová	1	2
(United States) L Granville	6	6
(Argentina) G Dulko	6	6
(Ukraine) Y Fedak	2	4
(Switzerland) E Gagliardi	1	2
26	(Italy) F Pennetta	6	6
19	(Serbia and Montenegro) A Ivanovic	6	6
(Russia) V Dushevina	4	3
(Czech Republic) D Chládková	3	6	1
(France) S Foretz	6	4	6
Q	(Ukraine) J Vakulenko	6	6
(Italy) T Garbin	2	4
(Czech Republic) L Šafářová	3	4
12	(France) M Pierce	6	6

Second round
(Greece) E Daniilidou	6	6
(United States) L Granville	2	0
(Argentina) G Dulko	2	4
26	(Italy) F Pennetta	6	6
19	(Serbia and Montenegro) A Ivanovic	6	6
(France) S Foretz	4	3
Q	(Ukraine) J Vakulenko	6	6^{7}	7
12	(France) M Pierce	4	7^{9}	9

Third round
(Greece) E Daniilidou	4	3
26	(Italy) F Pennetta	6	6
19	(Serbia and Montenegro) A Ivanovic	1	4
12	(France) M Pierce	6	6

Fourth round
26	(Italy) F Pennetta	3	1
12	(France) M Pierce	6	6

==== Section 6 ====
First round
14	(United States) V Williams	6	6
LL	(Czech Republic) E Birnerová	2	4
(Australia) N Pratt	3	6	6
(Slovakia) L Cervanová	6	3	1
Q	(United States) M Tu	3	3
(Israel) S Pe'er	6	6
(Russia) E Linetskaia	6	2	2
20	(Slovakia) D Hantuchová	3	6	6
29	(France) M Bartoli	6	6
(Japan) R Fujiwara	2	2
Q	(United States) A Harkleroad	4	6	4
(United States) J Craybas	6	4	6
Q	(Italy) M Santangelo	6	6
Q	(Belarus) T Poutchek	3	2
(United States) A Haynes	7^{14}	4	2
4	(United States) S Williams	6^{12}	6	6

Second round
14	(United States) V Williams	7	6
(Australia) N Pratt	5	3
(Israel) S Pe'er	2	6	3
20	(Slovakia) D Hantuchová	6	2	6
29	(France) M Bartoli	1	4
(United States) J Craybas	6	6
Q	(Italy) M Santangelo	6	3	2
4	(United States) S Williams	2	6	6

Third round
14	(United States) V Williams	7	6
20	(Slovakia) D Hantuchová	5	3
(United States) J Craybas	6	7^{7}
4	(United States) S Williams	3	6^{4}

Fourth round
14	(United States) V Williams	6	6
(United States) J Craybas	0	2

==== Section 7 ====
First round
8	(Russia) N Petrova	4	6	6
(Spain) V Ruano Pascual	6	3	2
(Luxembourg) C Schaul	2	1
LL	(France) S Beltrame	6	6
(Czech Republic) Z Ondrášková	3	3
WC	(Zimbabwe) C Black	6	6
(Colombia) C Castaño	7^{8}	3	4
32	(France) V Razzano	6^{6}	6	6
21	(Italy) F Schiavone	3	6	7
(Puerto Rico) K Brandi	6	3	9
(Spain) C Martínez	6	7^{7}
Q	(Ukraine) K Bondarenko	1	6^{4}
(Czech Republic) K Peschke	7	6
(Madagascar) D Randriantefy	5	1
(Germany) M Weingärtner	6	4	0
11	(Russia) V Zvonareva	2	6	6

Second round
8	(Russia) N Petrova	6	6
LL	(France) S Beltrame	1	2
WC	(Zimbabwe) C Black	6	7^{7}
32	(France) V Razzano	4	6^{5}
(Puerto Rico) K Brandi	2	3
(Spain) C Martínez	6	6
(Czech Republic) K Peschke	1	6	6
11	(Russia) V Zvonareva	6	4	3

Third round
8	(Russia) N Petrova	6	6
WC	(Zimbabwe) C Black	4	3
(Spain) C Martínez	4	1
(Czech Republic) K Peschke	6	6

Fourth round
8	(Russia) N Petrova	6^{5}	7^{9}	6
(Czech Republic) K Peschke	7^{7}	6^{7}	3

==== Section 8 ====
First round
16	(France) N Dechy	7^{7}	6
(Italy) ME Camerin	6^{1}	1
WC	(United Kingdom) J O'Donoghue	1	6	6
(Germany) A-L Grönefeld	6	1	4
(Russia) T Panova	7	6
(United States) L Raymond	5	3
(Ukraine) A Bondarenko	6	3	7
18	(France) T Golovin	3	6	5
31	(Spain) A Medina Garrigues	3	3
(Slovenia) K Srebotnik	6	6
(South Korea) Y-j Cho	6	6
(Spain) A Parra-Santonja	3	3
WC	(United Kingdom) A Janes	5	7^{8}	5
(Bulgaria) S Karatantcheva	7	6^{6}	7
(Spain) N Llagostera Vives	2	2
2	(Russia) M Sharapova	6	6

Second round
16	(France) N Dechy	6	6
WC	(United Kingdom) J O'Donoghue	2	1
(Russia) T Panova	3	6	3
(Ukraine) A Bondarenko	6	2	6
(Slovenia) K Srebotnik	7	6
(South Korea) Y-j Cho	5	4
(Bulgaria) S Karatantcheva	0	1
2	(Russia) M Sharapova	6	6

Third round
16	(France) N Dechy	6	6
(Ukraine) A Bondarenko	1	4
(Slovenia) K Srebotnik	2	4
2	(Russia) M Sharapova	6	6

Fourth round
16	(France) N Dechy	4	2
2	(Russia) M Sharapova	6	6

== Championship match statistics ==
Category	(United States) V. Williams	(United States) Davenport
1st serve %	96/130 (74%)	80/118 (68%)
1st serve points won	64 of 96 = 67%	49 of 80 = 61%
2nd serve points won	16 of 34 = 47%	20 of 38 = 53%
Total service points won	80 of 130 = 61.54%	69 of 118 = 58.47%
Aces	4	5
Double faults	10	5
Winners	64	49
Unforced errors	29	27
Net points won	19 of 24 = 79%	9 of 13 = 69%
Break points converted	4 of 8 = 50%	4 of 12 = 33%
Return points won	49 of 118 = 42%	50 of 130 = 38%
Total points won	129	119

Preceded by 2005 French Open – Women's singles	Grand Slam women's singles	Succeeded by 2005 US Open – Women's singles
