= 2005 Wimbledon Championships – Wheelchair men's doubles =

Wheelchair men's doubles
- 2005 Wimbledon Championships

Final
- Champions: (France) Michaël Jérémiasz (United Kingdom) Jayant Mistry
- Runners-up: (Australia) David Hall (Austria) Martin Legner
- Score: 4–6, 6–3, 7–6^{(8–6)}

Events
Singles	men	women		boys	girls
Doubles	men	women	mixed	boys	girls
WC Singles	men	women	quad
WC Doubles	men	women	quad
Legends	men	women	seniors
Wimbledon Championships	· 2006 →

Michaël Jérémiasz and Jayant Mistry defeated David Hall and Martin Legner in the final, 4–6, 6–3, 7–6 to win the inaugural gentlemen's doubles wheelchair tennis title at the 2005 Wimbledon Championships.

== Draw ==
=== Key ===
- Q = Qualifier
- WC = Wild card
- LL = Lucky loser
- Alt = Alternate
- ITF = ITF entry
- PR = Protected ranking
- SR = Special ranking
- SE = Special exempt
- JE = Junior exempt
- JR = Junior Accelerator Programme entrant
- CO = College Accelerator Programme entrant
- NG = Next Gen Accelerator Program entrant
- w/o = Walkover
- r = Retired
- d = Defaulted

=== Finals ===
Semifinals
(France) Michaël Jeremiasz (United Kingdom) Jayant Mistry	6	6
(Czech Republic) Miroslav Brychta (France) Lahcen Majdi	3	4
(Australia) David Hall (Austria) Martin Legner	6	0	6
(Netherlands) Maikel Scheffers (Netherlands) Ronald Vink	2	6	1

Final
(France) Michaël Jeremiasz (United Kingdom) Jayant Mistry	4	6	7^{8}
(Australia) David Hall (Austria) Martin Legner	6	3	6^{6}
3rd place playoff
(Czech Republic) Miroslav Brychta (France) Lahcen Majdi	5	3
(Netherlands) Maikel Scheffers (Netherlands) Ronald Vink	7	6
