= 2005 Wimbledon Championships – Men's singles =

Men's singles
- 2005 Wimbledon Championships

Final
- Champion: (Switzerland) Roger Federer
- Runner-up: (United States) Andy Roddick
- Score: 6–2, 7–6^{(7–2)}, 6–4

Details
- Draw: 128 (16Q / 8WC)
- Seeds: 32

Events
Singles	men	women		boys	girls
Doubles	men	women	mixed	boys	girls
WC Singles	men	women	quad
WC Doubles	men	women	quad
Legends	men	women	seniors
- Wimbledon Championships

Two-time defending champion Roger Federer defeated Andy Roddick in a rematch of the previous year's final, 6–2, 7–6^{(7–2)}, 6–4 to win the gentlemen's singles tennis title at the 2005 Wimbledon Championships. It was his third Wimbledon title and fifth major title overall. It was the second of three years that Federer defeated Roddick in the final (following 2004 and preceding 2009). It was also the pair's third straight meeting at Wimbledon, after the 2003 semifinals and the 2004 final.

This marked the first major appearance of future world No. 1, two-time Olympic gold medalist and two-time Wimbledon champion Andy Murray, and the first Wimbledon appearance of future world No. 1, Olympic gold medalist, and seven-time Wimbledon champion Novak Djokovic. Both players were defeated in the third round: Djokovic lost to Sébastien Grosjean in four sets, while Murray lost to David Nalbandian after leading two sets to love; it would be the only professional match that Murray lost from two sets up. By reaching the third round, Djokovic entered the top 100 in the ATP rankings for the first time in his career.

== Seeds ==
1. (Switzerland) Roger Federer (champion)
2. (United States) Andy Roddick (final)
3. (Australia) Lleyton Hewitt (semifinals)
4. (Spain) Rafael Nadal (second round)
5. (Russia) Marat Safin (third round)
6. (United Kingdom) Tim Henman (second round)
7. (Argentina) Guillermo Cañas (withdrew)
8. (Russia) Nikolay Davydenko (second round)
9. (France) Sébastien Grosjean (quarterfinals)
10. (Croatia) Mario Ančić (fourth round)
11. (Sweden) Joachim Johansson (third round)
12. (Sweden) Thomas Johansson (semifinals)
13. (Spain) Tommy Robredo (first round)
14. (Czech Republic) Radek Štěpánek (second round)
15. (Argentina) Guillermo Coria (fourth round)
16. (Argentina) ~~Mariano Puerta (first round)~~
17. (Spain) David Ferrer (first round)
18. (Argentina) David Nalbandian (quarterfinals)
19. (Germany) Tommy Haas (first round)
20. (Croatia) Ivan Ljubičić (first round)
21. (Chile) Fernando González (quarterfinals)
22. (Slovakia) Dominik Hrbatý (second round)
23. (Spain) Juan Carlos Ferrero (fourth round)
24. (United States) Taylor Dent (fourth round)
25. (Germany) Nicolas Kiefer (third round)
26. (Spain) Feliciano López (quarterfinals)
27. (France) Richard Gasquet (fourth round)
28. (Czech Republic) Jiří Novák (third round)
29. (Chile) Nicolás Massú (second round)
30. (Sweden) Robin Söderling (first round)
31. (Russia) Mikhail Youzhny (fourth round)
32. (Italy) Filippo Volandri (first round)
33. (Belgium) Olivier Rochus (second round)

Click on the seed number of a player to go to their draw section.

Guillermo Cañas withdrew due to injury. He was replaced in the draw by the highest-ranked non-seeded player Olivier Rochus, who became the #33 seed.

== Draw ==
Key

- Q = Qualifier
- WC = Wild card
- LL = Lucky loser
- Alt = Alternate
- ITF = ITF entry
- PR = Protected ranking
- SR = Special ranking
- SE = Special exempt
- JE = Junior exempt
- JR = Junior Accelerator Programme entrant
- CO = College Accelerator Programme entrant
- NG = Next Gen Accelerator Program entrant
- w/o = Walkover
- r = Retired
- d = Defaulted

=== Finals ===
Quarterfinals
1	(Switzerland) Roger Federer	7	6	7^{7}
21	(Chile) Fernando González	5	2	6^{2}
3	(Australia) Lleyton Hewitt	7	6	7^{7}
26	(Spain) Feliciano López	5	4	6^{2}
12	(Sweden) Thomas Johansson	7^{7}	6	6
18	(Argentina) David Nalbandian	6^{5}	2	2
9	(France) Sébastien Grosjean	6	2	1	6	3
2	(United States) Andy Roddick	3	6	6	3	6

Semifinals
1	(Switzerland) Roger Federer	6	6	7^{7}
3	(Australia) Lleyton Hewitt	3	4	6^{4}
12	(Sweden) Thomas Johansson	7^{8}	2	6^{10}	6^{5}
2	(United States) Andy Roddick	6^{6}	6	7^{12}	7^{7}

Final
1	(Switzerland) Roger Federer	6	7^{7}	6
2	(United States) Andy Roddick	2	6^{2}	4

=== Top half ===
==== Section 1 ====
First round
1	(Switzerland) R Federer	6	6	6
(France) P-H Mathieu	4	2	4
(Czech Republic) I Minář	6	6	6
(Czech Republic) M Tabara	4	4	4
WC	(United Kingdom) J Goodall	3	6^{4}	3
(Italy) A di Mauro	6	7^{7}	6
(France) J Benneteau	3	6^{5}	7	6	4
25	(Germany) N Kiefer	6	7^{7}	5	3	6
23	(Spain) JC Ferrero	7^{7}	6	6
Q	(United Kingdom) J Delgado	6^{2}	1	4
(Sweden) T Enqvist	3	7^{7}	5	4
(South Korea) H-t Lee	6	6^{4}	7	6
(Germany) F Mayer	6	7	6
(Spain) S Ventura Bertomeu	4	5	2
(Spain) F Verdasco	6	6	7
13	(Spain) T Robredo	1	2	5

Second round
1	(Switzerland) R Federer	6	6	6
(Czech Republic) I Minář	4	4	1
(Italy) A di Mauro	3	5	3
25	(Germany) N Kiefer	6	7	6
23	(Spain) JC Ferrero	6	3	4	6	6
(South Korea) H-t Lee	4	6	6	3	3
(Germany) F Mayer	7^{8}	7	6
(Spain) F Verdasco	6^{6}	5	3

Third round
1	(Switzerland) R Federer	6	6^{5}	6	7
25	(Germany) N Kiefer	2	7^{7}	1	5
23	(Spain) JC Ferrero	3	6	6	6
(Germany) F Mayer	6	2	1	1

Fourth round
1	(Switzerland) R Federer	6	6	7^{8}
23	(Spain) JC Ferrero	3	4	6^{6}

==== Section 2 ====
First round
11	(Sweden) J Johansson	7^{7}	6	7
(Spain) A Montañés	6^{5}	4	5
(Spain) A Martín	3	6	2	1
(United Kingdom) G Rusedski	6	4	6	6
(Argentina) J Acasuso	5	3	3
(Czech Republic) T Zíb	7	6	6
WC	(United Kingdom) A Mackin	3	4	4
21	(Chile) F González	6	6	6
31	(Russia) M Youzhny	6	3	6	6
(Cyprus) M Baghdatis	2	6	1	4
(Spain) Ó Hernández	4	1^{r}
(France) J-R Lisnard	6	2
(Sweden) J Björkman	6	6	4	2	6
Q	(United States) J Morrison	3	3	6	6	2
PR	(Australia) S Draper	6^{4}	4	3
8	(Russia) N Davydenko	7^{7}	6	6

Second round
11	(Sweden) J Johansson	7^{12}	3	6	7^{7}
(United Kingdom) G Rusedski	6^{10}	6	4	6^{5}
(Czech Republic) T Zíb	4	6^{6}	3
21	(Chile) F González	6	7^{8}	6
31	(Russia) M Youzhny	1	7	6	6
(France) J-R Lisnard	6	5	3	4
(Sweden) J Björkman	6^{4}	1
8	(Russia) N Davydenko	7^{7}	2^{r}

Third round
11	(Sweden) J Johansson	4	4	2
21	(Chile) F González	6	6	6
31	(Russia) M Youzhny	7	6	3	7^{11}
(Sweden) J Björkman	5	3	6	6^{9}

Fourth round
21	(Chile) F González	7^{7}	7^{7}	6
31	(Russia) M Youzhny	6^{3}	6^{5}	3

==== Section 3 ====
First round
3	(Australia) L Hewitt	6	6	6
(Belgium) C Rochus	3	3	1
(Czech Republic) J Hernych	1	6	7^{8}	7^{7}
WC	(United States) J Blake	6	4	6^{6}	6^{4}
LL	(United States) J Gimelstob	6	6	7^{7}
Q	(Chile) A García	3	4	6^{5}
(Armenia) S Sargsian	6^{7}	3	4
29	(Chile) N Massú	7^{9}	6	6
24	(United States) T Dent	7^{7}	7^{7}	4	6^{7}	6
Q	(Belgium) D Norman	6^{4}	6^{4}	6	7^{9}	1
(United States) K Kim	6^{4}	6	6	6
WC	(United Kingdom) A Bogdanovic	7^{7}	1	4	2
Q	(France) A Dupuis	6^{5}	5	6	6^{4}
(Czech Republic) T Berdych	7^{7}	7	3	7^{7}
(Germany) L Burgsmüller	6	6	6
16	(Argentina) ~~M Puerta~~	1	1	4

Second round
3	(Australia) L Hewitt	6	7	3	6
(Czech Republic) J Hernych	2	5	6	3
LL	(United States) J Gimelstob	6	4	7^{7}	7^{7}
29	(Chile) N Massú	3	6	6^{5}	6^{0}
24	(United States) T Dent	6	6	6
(United States) K Kim	3	4	4
(Czech Republic) T Berdych	6	6	6
(Germany) L Burgsmüller	3	3	1

Third round
3	(Australia) L Hewitt	7^{7}	6	7
LL	(United States) J Gimelstob	6^{5}	4	5
24	(United States) T Dent	6	7^{7}	6
(Czech Republic) T Berdych	3	6^{5}	3

Fourth round
3	(Australia) L Hewitt	6	6	6^{7}	6
24	(United States) T Dent	4	4	7^{9}	3

==== Section 4 ====
First round
10	(Croatia) M Ančić	6	7	6
Q	(Germany) T Summerer	3	5	1
Q	(Thailand) D Udomchoke	5	6	4	6	8
(Austria) S Koubek	7	4	6	3	6
(France) G Monfils	3	6	6	7^{16}
Q	(Israel) N Okun	6	4	4	6^{14}
(France) C Saulnier	6^{0}	0	2
22	(Slovakia) D Hrbatý	7^{7}	6	6
26	(Spain) F López	5	7^{10}	6^{5}	6	6
(Germany) B Phau	7	6^{8}	7^{7}	2	4
WC	(United Kingdom) D Sherwood	6	6	6
(Brazil) R Mello	3	4	4
(Slovakia) K Beck	5	4	2
WC	(Australia) M Philippoussis	7	6	6
(Thailand) P Srichaphan	2	4	4
5	(Russia) M Safin	6	6	6

Second round
10	(Croatia) M Ančić	7^{8}	3	6	6
Q	(Thailand) D Udomchoke	6^{6}	6	3	3
(France) G Monfils	6	6	2	7
22	(Slovakia) D Hrbatý	3	3	6	5
26	(Spain) F López	6	6	6
WC	(United Kingdom) D Sherwood	2	4	2
WC	(Australia) M Philippoussis	6^{4}	6^{4}	4
5	(Russia) M Safin	7^{7}	7^{7}	6

Third round
10	(Croatia) M Ančić	6	6	6
(France) G Monfils	3	3	1
26	(Spain) F López	6	7^{7}	6
5	(Russia) M Safin	4	6^{4}	3

Fourth round
10	(Croatia) M Ančić	4	4	2
26	(Spain) F López	6	6	6

=== Bottom half ===
==== Section 5 ====
First round
33	(Belgium) O Rochus	6	6	6
LL	(United States) P Goldstein	4	2	2
(Belarus) M Mirnyi	6	6	6
(Germany) R Schüttler	3	3	4
(Switzerland) S Wawrinka	2	7^{9}	5	1
(France) F Santoro	6	6^{7}	7	6
(Netherlands) P Wessels	6^{4}	3	4
28	(Czech Republic) J Novák	7^{7}	6	6
19	(Germany) T Haas	2	1^{r}
(Serbia and Montenegro) J Tipsarević	6	2
Q	(Chinese Taipei) Y-h Lu	7^{7}	0	6	3	6
Q	(France) A Clément	6^{4}	6	1	6	3
(Romania) A Pavel	6	4	6	6
Q	(Croatia) R Karanušić	2	6	2	4
(Czech Republic) B Ulihrach	3	2	2
12	(Sweden) T Johansson	6	6	6

Second round
33	(Belgium) O Rochus	6^{4}	2	6^{3}
(Belarus) M Mirnyi	7^{7}	6	7^{7}
(France) F Santoro	1	6	6^{4}	3
28	(Czech Republic) J Novák	6	4	7^{7}	6
(Serbia and Montenegro) J Tipsarević	2	6	6	4	7
Q	(Chinese Taipei) Y-h Lu	6	3	2	6	5
(Romania) A Pavel	6	6^{4}	4	6^{4}
12	(Sweden) T Johansson	3	7^{7}	6	7^{7}

Third round
(Belarus) M Mirnyi	5	7	6	7^{7}
28	(Czech Republic) J Novák	7	5	4	6^{2}
(Serbia and Montenegro) J Tipsarević	2	3	1
12	(Sweden) T Johansson	6	6	6

Fourth round
(Belarus) M Mirnyi	4	5	4
12	(Sweden) T Johansson	6	7	6

==== Section 6 ====
First round
14	(Czech Republic) R Štěpánek	6^{5}	6	6	6
(United States) R Ginepri	7^{7}	3	4	2
WC	(United Kingdom) A Murray	6	6	6
Q	(Switzerland) G Bastl	4	2	2
PR	(Slovakia) K Kučera	4	6	6	6
(Peru) L Horna	6	3	3	4
(Netherlands) R Sluiter	2	2	5
18	(Argentina) D Nalbandian	6	6	7
27	(France) R Gasquet	6	3	6	6
(Germany) P Kohlschreiber	3	6	3	2
Q	(Belgium) G Elseneer	6	7^{11}	6
(Italy) P Starace	3	6^{9}	3
(Spain) F Mantilla	4^{r}
(Luxembourg) G Müller	5
(United States) V Spadea	4	3	0
4	(Spain) R Nadal	6	6	6

Second round
14	(Czech Republic) R Štěpánek	4	4	4
WC	(United Kingdom) A Murray	6	6	6
PR	(Slovakia) K Kučera	2	4	3
18	(Argentina) D Nalbandian	6	6	6
27	(France) R Gasquet	7^{9}	7^{7}	6^{3}	6
Q	(Belgium) G Elseneer	6^{7}	6^{3}	7^{7}	2
(Luxembourg) G Müller	6	4	6	6
4	(Spain) R Nadal	4	6	3	4

Third round
WC	(United Kingdom) A Murray	7^{7}	6	0	4	1
18	(Argentina) D Nalbandian	6^{4}	1	6	6	6
27	(France) R Gasquet	7^{7}	6	6
(Luxembourg) G Müller	6^{3}	3	3

Fourth round
18	(Argentina) D Nalbandian	6	7^{7}	6
27	(France) R Gasquet	4	6^{3}	0

==== Section 7 ====
First round
6	(United Kingdom) T Henman	3	6^{5}	6	7	6
(Finland) J Nieminen	6	7^{7}	4	5	2
(Spain) N Almagro	6^{2}	6^{4}	1
PR	(Russia) D Tursunov	7^{7}	7^{7}	6
PR	(Germany) A Popp	6	6	2	6
(France) J Haehnel	2	3	6	4
(Australia) W Arthurs	6	6	6
32	(Italy) F Volandri	3	4	4
17	(Spain) D Ferrer	3	2	6^{7}
(Spain) G García López	6	6	7^{9}
(Argentina) J Mónaco	3	6^{5}	3
Q	(Serbia and Montenegro) N Djokovic	6	7^{7}	6
(Romania) V Hănescu	6^{2}	7^{7}	6	5	6
(Denmark) K Carlsen	7^{7}	6^{4}	3	7	4
(France) M Llodra	6	5	6	6^{5}	4
9	(France) S Grosjean	3	7	4	7^{7}	6

Second round
6	(United Kingdom) T Henman	6	2	6	3	6
PR	(Russia) D Tursunov	3	6	3	6	8
PR	(Germany) A Popp	6	6^{4}	3	7^{7}	14
(Australia) W Arthurs	3	7^{7}	6	6^{4}	12
(Spain) G García López	6	6	6^{5}	6^{3}	4
Q	(Serbia and Montenegro) N Djokovic	3	3	7^{7}	7^{7}	6
(Romania) V Hănescu	3	4	2
9	(France) S Grosjean	6	6	6

Third round
PR	(Russia) D Tursunov	5	7^{7}	6	6
PR	(Germany) A Popp	7	6^{5}	2	2
Q	(Serbia and Montenegro) N Djokovic	5	4	7	4
9	(France) S Grosjean	7	6	5	6

Fourth round
PR	(Russia) D Tursunov	4	7^{7}	3	6	1
9	(France) S Grosjean	6	6^{5}	6	3	6

==== Section 8 ====
First round
15	(Argentina) G Coria	6	6	6
(Germany) T Behrend	1	2	2
WC	(United Kingdom) J Marray	3	6	6	1	4
(Belgium) X Malisse	6	3	2	6	6
(Spain) A Calatrava	6	7^{7}	6
Q	(Finland) T Ketola	4	6^{4}	4
(Austria) J Melzer	6	6	6
20	(Croatia) I Ljubičić	4	4	4
30	(Sweden) R Söderling	7^{7}	5	1	5
(Russia) I Andreev	6^{3}	7	6	7
(Italy) D Sanguinetti	6	6	6
Q	(Italy) A Seppi	3	2	1
LL	(Italy) D Bracciali	6^{4}	7^{10}	3	7^{7}	12
(Croatia) I Karlović	7^{7}	6^{8}	6	6^{5}	10
(Czech Republic) J Vaněk	1	6^{4}	2
2	(United States) A Roddick	6	7^{7}	6

Second round
15	(Argentina) G Coria	3	6	7	6^{3}	6
(Belgium) X Malisse	6	3	5	7^{7}	4
(Spain) Á Calatrava	4	4	1
(Austria) J Melzer	6	6	6
(Russia) I Andreev	6	6	3	6
(Italy) D Sanguinetti	4	2	6	3
LL	(Italy) D Bracciali	5	3	7^{7}	6	3
2	(United States) A Roddick	7	6	6^{3}	4	6

Third round
15	(Argentina) G Coria	3	3	6	6	6
(Austria) J Melzer	6	6	2	2	4
(Russia) I Andreev	2	2	6^{4}
2	(United States) A Roddick	6	6	7^{7}

Fourth round
15	(Argentina) G Coria	3	6^{1}	4
2	(United States) A Roddick	6	7^{7}	6

Preceded by 2005 French Open – Men's singles	Grand Slam men's singles	Succeeded by 2005 US Open – Men's singles
