= 2005 Wimbledon Championships – Women's doubles =

Women's doubles
- 2005 Wimbledon Championships

Final
- Champions: (Zimbabwe) Cara Black (South Africa) Liezel Huber
- Runners-up: (Russia) Svetlana Kuznetsova (France) Amélie Mauresmo
- Score: 6–2, 6–1

Details
- Draw: 64 (4Q / 6WC)
- Seeds: 16

Events
Singles	men	women		boys	girls
Doubles	men	women	mixed	boys	girls
WC Singles	men	women	quad
WC Doubles	men	women	quad
Legends	men	women	seniors
- Wimbledon Championships

Cara Black and Rennae Stubbs were the defending champions, but did not play together. Stubbs partnered with Lisa Raymond but lost in the first round to Stéphanie Cohen-Aloro and Selima Sfar.

Black competed with Liezel Huber and defeated Svetlana Kuznetsova and Amélie Mauresmo in the final, 6–2, 6–1 to win the ladies' doubles tennis title at the 2005 Wimbledon Championships.

== Seeds ==
1. (Spain) Virginia Ruano Pascual / (Argentina) Paola Suárez (withdrew)
2. (Zimbabwe) Cara Black / (South Africa) Liezel Huber (champions)
3. (United States) Lisa Raymond / (Australia) Rennae Stubbs (first round)
4. (Russia) Nadia Petrova / (United States) Meghann Shaughnessy (quarterfinals)
5. (Russia) Elena Likhovtseva / (Russia) Vera Zvonareva (quarterfinals)
6. (Slovakia) Janette Husárová / (Spain) Conchita Martínez (third round)
7. (Slovakia) Daniela Hantuchová / (Japan) Ai Sugiyama (quarterfinals)
8. (Germany) Anna-Lena Grönefeld / (United States) Martina Navratilova (semifinals)
9. (Spain) Anabel Medina Garrigues / (Russia) Dinara Safina (third round)
10. (Japan) Shinobu Asagoe / (Slovenia) Katarina Srebotnik (third round)
11. (Australia) Bryanne Stewart / (Australia) Samantha Stosur (semifinals)
12. (United States) Lindsay Davenport / (United States) Corina Morariu (second round)
13. (Argentina) Gisela Dulko / (Venezuela) María Vento-Kabchi (first round)
14. (Greece) Eleni Daniilidou / (Australia) Nicole Pratt (second round)
15. (France) Émilie Loit / (Czech Republic) Barbora Strýcová (third round)
16. (Czech Republic) Gabriela Navrátilová / (Czech Republic) Michaela Paštiková (second round)
17. (Belgium) Els Callens / (Switzerland) Emmanuelle Gagliardi (third round)

Click on the seed number of a player to go to their draw section.

Paola Suárez suffered a hip injury, leading Virginia Ruano Pascual and Suárez to withdraw from the tournament. They were replaced in the draw by the highest-ranked non-seeded pair Els Callens and Emmanuelle Gagliardi, who became the #17 seeds.

== Draw ==
Key

- Q = Qualifier
- WC = Wild card
- LL = Lucky loser
- Alt = Alternate
- ITF = ITF entry
- PR = Protected ranking
- SR = Special ranking
- SE = Special exempt
- JE = Junior exempt
- JR = Junior Accelerator Programme entrant
- CO = College Accelerator Programme entrant
- NG = Next Gen Accelerator Program entrant
- w/o = Walkover
- r = Retired
- d = Defaulted

=== Finals ===
Quarterfinals
(Russia) Vera Dushevina (Israel) Shahar Pe'er	6^{5}	4
8	(Germany) Anna-Lena Grönefeld (United States) Martina Navratilova	7^{7}	6
(Russia) Svetlana Kuznetsova (France) Amélie Mauresmo	6	6^{4}	6
5	(Russia) Elena Likhovtseva (Russia) Vera Zvonareva	3	7^{7}	1
11	(Australia) Bryanne Stewart (Australia) Samantha Stosur	3	6	6
4	(Russia) Nadia Petrova (United States) Meghann Shaughnessy	6	4	4
7	(Slovakia) Daniela Hantuchová (Japan) Ai Sugiyama	3	2
2	(Zimbabwe) Cara Black (South Africa) Liezel Huber	6	6

Semifinals
8	(Germany) Anna-Lena Grönefeld (United States) Martina Navratilova	4	4
(Russia) Svetlana Kuznetsova (France) Amélie Mauresmo	6	6
11	(Australia) Bryanne Stewart (Australia) Samantha Stosur	0	2
2	(Zimbabwe) Cara Black (South Africa) Liezel Huber	6	6

Final
(Russia) Svetlana Kuznetsova (France) Amélie Mauresmo	2	1
2	(Zimbabwe) Cara Black (South Africa) Liezel Huber	6	6

=== Top half ===
==== Section 1 ====
First round
17	(Belgium) E Callens (Switzerland) E Gagliardi	6	7^{7}
(Italy) S Farina Elia (Italy) R Vinci	3	6^{4}
(Argentina) M Díaz Oliva (Slovakia) M Suchá	5	6	1
WC	(United Kingdom) E Baltacha (United Kingdom) J O'Donoghue	7	1	6
(United States) J Craybas (Germany) M Weingärtner	6^{4}	6^{9}
(Russia) V Duchevina (Israel) S Pe'er	7^{7}	7^{11}
(France) N Dechy (Croatia) K Šprem	6^{6}	4
16	(Czech Republic) G Navrátilová (Czech Republic) M Paštiková	7^{8}	6
10	(Japan) S Asagoe (Slovenia) K Srebotnik	6	3	6
(Spain) M Marrero (Spain) A Parra Santonja	0	6	3
(Luxembourg) A Kremer (Israel) A Smashnova	3	6	2
Q	(Australia) E Dominikovic (Japan) A Nakamura	6	3	6
(Czech Republic) D Chládková (France) V Razzano	6	6
(Russia) E Linetskaya (Czech Republic) N Vaidišová	4	3
Q	(Japan) R Fujiwara (Japan) S Obata	3	3
5	(Germany) A-L Grönefeld (United States) M Navratilova	6	6

Second round
17	(Belgium) E Callens (Switzerland) E Gagliardi	6	6
WC	(United Kingdom) E Baltacha (United Kingdom) J O'Donoghue	1	2
(Russia) V Duchevina (Israel) S Pe'er	6	6^{7}	8
16	(Czech Republic) G Navrátilová (Czech Republic) M Paštiková	2	7^{9}	6
10	(Japan) S Asagoe (Slovenia) K Srebotnik	3	6	6
Q	(Australia) E Dominikovic (Japan) A Nakamura	6	2	3
(Czech Republic) D Chládková (France) V Razzano	1	4
5	(Germany) A-L Grönefeld (United States) M Navratilova	6	6

Third round
17	(Belgium) E Callens (Switzerland) E Gagliardi	7	3	5
(Russia) V Duchevina (Israel) S Pe'er	5	6	7
10	(Japan) S Asagoe (Slovenia) K Srebotnik	3	3
8	(Germany) A-L Grönefeld (United States) M Navratilova	6	6

Quarterfinals
(Russia) V Duchevina (Israel) S Pe'er	6^{5}	4
8	(Germany) A-L Grönefeld (United States) M Navratilova	7^{7}	6

==== Section 2 ====
First round
3	(United States) L Raymond (Australia) R Stubbs	4	6	2
(France) S Cohen-Aloro (Tunisia) S Sfar	6	3	6
(Australia) L McShea (United States) A Spears	6^{4}	6	6
Q	(Belarus) T Poutchek (Belarus) A Yakimova	7^{7}	1	1
(Russia) S Kuznetsova (France) A Mauresmo	7	6
(Slovakia) L Cervanová (Czech Republic) K Koukalová	5	2
(United States) L Granville (Chinese Taipei) J Lee	3	6	6
13	(Argentina) G Dulko (Venezuela) M Vento-Kabchi	6	4	0
12	(United States) L Davenport (United States) C Morariu	7	6
(Serbia and Montenegro) J Janković (Croatia) J Kostanić	5	3
(Italy) ME Camerin (Italy) T Garbin	0	4
(France) M Bartoli (Venezuela) M Sequera	6	6
(United States) J Hopkins (United States) M Washington	7^{7}	6
(Czech Republic) I Benešová (Russia) G Voskoboeva	6^{5}	1
Q	(Ukraine) A Bondarenko (Russia) A Rodionova	2	5
5	(Russia) E Likhovtseva (Russia) V Zvonareva	6	7

Second round
(France) S Cohen-Aloro (Tunisia) S Sfar	1	2
(Australia) L McShea (United States) A Spears	6	6
(Russia) S Kuznetsova (France) A Mauresmo	6	6
(United States) L Granville (Chinese Taipei) J Lee	1	2
12	(United States) L Davenport (United States) C Morariu	6^{2}	6	4
(France) M Bartoli (Venezuela) M Sequera	7^{7}	3	6
(United States) J Hopkins (United States) M Washington	7^{7}	2	1
5	(Russia) E Likhovtseva (Russia) V Zvonareva	6^{5}	6	6

Third round
(Australia) L McShea (United States) A Spears	6^{3}	2
(Russia) S Kuznetsova (France) A Mauresmo	7^{7}	6
(France) M Bartoli (Venezuela) M Sequera	4	6	3
5	(Russia) E Likhovtseva (Russia) V Zvonareva	6	3	6

Quarterfinals
(Russia) S Kuznetsova (France) A Mauresmo	6	6^{4}	6
5	(Russia) E Likhovtseva (Russia) V Zvonareva	3	7^{7}	1

=== Bottom half ===
==== Section 3 ====
First round
6	(Slovakia) J Husárová (Spain) C Martínez	6	1	6
(Czech Republic) E Birnerová (Romania) A Vanc	2	6	1
(Spain) N Llagostera Vives (Spain) M Sánchez Lorenzo	6	6
(Puerto Rico) K Brandi (Czech Republic) L Šafářová	3	1
WC	(United Kingdom) K O'Brien (United Kingdom) M South	3	2
(Ukraine) Y Beygelzimer (Italy) A Serra Zanetti	6	6
WC	(United Kingdom) A Janes (United Kingdom) A Keothavong	0	3
11	(Australia) B Stewart (Australia) S Stosur	6	6
14	(Greece) E Daniilidou (Australia) N Pratt	7	6
(Czech Republic) K Peschke (Germany) J Schruff	5	4
(Italy) F Pennetta (Italy) F Schiavone	2	4
(Serbia and Montenegro) A Ivanovic (Slovenia) T Križan	6	6
(Colombia) C Castaño (Croatia) S Mamić	6	2	2
(Poland) M Domachowska (Croatia) S Talaja	4	6	6
WC	(United Kingdom) C Curran (South Africa) N Grandin	4	6^{3}
4	(Russia) N Petrova (United States) M Shaughnessy	6	7^{7}

Second round
6	(Slovakia) J Husárová (Spain) C Martínez	6	6
(Spain) N Llagostera Vives (Spain) M Sánchez Lorenzo	2	3
(Ukraine) Y Beygelzimer (Italy) A Serra Zanetti	1	1
11	(Australia) B Stewart (Australia) S Stosur	6	6
14	(Greece) E Daniilidou (Australia) N Pratt	3	1
(Serbia and Montenegro) A Ivanovic (Slovenia) T Križan	6	6
(Poland) M Domachowska (Croatia) S Talaja	3	1
4	(Russia) N Petrova (United States) M Shaughnessy	6	6

Third round
6	(Slovakia) J Husárová (Spain) C Martínez	6^{8}	7^{7}	1
11	(Australia) B Stewart (Australia) S Stosur	7^{10}	6^{5}	6
(Serbia and Montenegro) A Ivanovic (Slovenia) T Križan	1	3
4	(Russia) N Petrova (United States) M Shaughnessy	6	6

Quarterfinals
11	(Australia) B Stewart (Australia) S Stosur	3	6	6
4	(Russia) N Petrova (United States) M Shaughnessy	6	4	4

==== Section 4 ====
First round
7	(Slovakia) D Hantuchová (Japan) A Sugiyama	7^{7}	6
LL	(Argentina) E Krauth (Canada) M-È Pelletier	6^{1}	1
(Japan) N Miyagi (Russia) A Myskina	6	6
WC	(United Kingdom) A Hawkins (United Kingdom) R Llewellyn	4	0
LL	(Ukraine) Y Fedak (United States) L Osterloh	4	1
(United States) J Russell (Italy) M Santangelo	6	6
(Bulgaria) S Karatantcheva (Thailand) T Tanasugarn	4	2
9	(Spain) A Medina Garrigues (Russia) D Safina	6	6
15	(France) É Loit (Czech Republic) B Strýcová	6	7
(Madagascar) D Randriantefy (United States) M Tu	3	5
(Russia) A Jidkova (Ukraine) T Perebiynis	6	6
(Russia) A Chakvetadze (India) S Mirza	2	1
(Japan) A Morigami (Australia) T Musgrave	6	7
LL	(Romania) E Gallovits (United States) A Haynes	1	5
WC	(United Kingdom) S Borwell (United Kingdom) E Webley-Smith	1	2
2	(Zimbabwe) C Black (South Africa) L Huber	6	6

Second round
7	(Slovakia) D Hantuchová (Japan) A Sugiyama	7	7^{7}
(Japan) N Miyagi (Russia) A Myskina	5	6^{5}
(United States) J Russell (Italy) M Santangelo	1	6^{7}
9	(Spain) A Medina Garrigues (Russia) D Safina	6	7^{9}
15	(France) É Loit (Czech Republic) B Strýcová	3	6	7
(Russia) A Jidkova (Ukraine) T Perebiynis	6	4	5
(Japan) A Morigami (Australia) T Musgrave	2	1
2	(Zimbabwe) C Black (South Africa) L Huber	6	6

Third round
7	(Slovakia) D Hantuchová (Japan) A Sugiyama	6	2
9	(Spain) A Medina Garrigues (Russia) D Safina	2	1
15	(France) É Loit (Czech Republic) B Strýcová	1	5
2	(Zimbabwe) C Black (South Africa) L Huber	6	7

Quarterfinals
11	(Slovakia) D Hantuchová (Japan) A Sugiyama	3	2
4	(Zimbabwe) C Black (South Africa) L Huber	6	6
