= 2005 Wimbledon Championships – Men's doubles =

Men's doubles
- 2005 Wimbledon Championships

Final
- Champions: (Australia) Stephen Huss (South Africa) Wesley Moodie
- Runners-up: (United States) Bob Bryan (United States) Mike Bryan
- Score: 7–6^{(7–4)}, 6–3, 6–7^{(2–7)}, 6–3

Details
- Draw: 64 (4Q / 7WC)
- Seeds: 16

Events
Singles	men	women		boys	girls
Doubles	men	women	mixed	boys	girls
WC Singles	men	women	quad
WC Doubles	men	women	quad
Legends	men	women	seniors
- Wimbledon Championships

Jonas Björkman and Todd Woodbridge were the two-time defending champions but did not play together. Björkman partnered with Max Mirnyi and Woodbridge partnered with Mahesh Bhupathi but both pairs lost to Stephen Huss and Wesley Moodie, in the semifinals and the second round respectively.

Huss and Moodie defeated Bob and Mike Bryan in the final, 7–6^{(7–4)}, 6–3, 6–7^{(2–7)}, 6–3, to win the gentlemen's doubles title at the 2005 Wimbledon Championships In doing so, Huss and Moodie became the first qualifiers to win the men's doubles title.

== Seeds ==
1. (Sweden) Jonas Björkman / (Belarus) Max Mirnyi (semifinal)
2. (United States) Bob Bryan / (United States) Mike Bryan (final)
3. (The Bahamas) Mark Knowles / (France) Michaël Llodra (Quarterfinal)
4. (Zimbabwe) Wayne Black / (Zimbabwe) Kevin Ullyett (semifinal)
5. (India) Leander Paes / (Serbia and Montenegro) Nenad Zimonjić (Quarterfinal)
6. (India) Mahesh Bhupathi / (Australia) Todd Woodbridge (second round)
7. (Australia) Wayne Arthurs / (Australia) Paul Hanley (first round)
8. (Sweden) Simon Aspelin / (Australia) Todd Perry (first round)
9. (Czech Republic) František Čermák / (Czech Republic) Leoš Friedl (third round)
10. (Czech Republic) Martin Damm / (Argentina) Mariano Hood (second round)
11. (Czech Republic) Cyril Suk / (Czech Republic) Pavel Vízner (third round)
12. (Chile) Fernando González / (Chile) Nicolás Massú (second round)
13. (Austria) Julian Knowle / (Austria) Jürgen Melzer (third round)
14. (Argentina) Gastón Etlis / (Argentina) Martín Rodríguez (third round)
15. (Israel) Jonathan Erlich / (Israel) Andy Ram (third round)
16. (Switzerland) Yves Allegro / (Germany) Michael Kohlmann (first round)

Click on the seed number of a player to go to their draw section.

== Draw ==
Key

- Q = Qualifier
- WC = Wild card
- LL = Lucky loser
- Alt = Alternate
- ITF = ITF entry
- PR = Protected ranking
- SR = Special ranking
- SE = Special exempt
- JE = Junior exempt
- JR = Junior Accelerator Programme entrant
- CO = College Accelerator Programme entrant
- NG = Next Gen Accelerator Program entrant
- w/o = Walkover
- r = Retired
- d = Defaulted

=== Finals ===
Quarterfinals
1	(Sweden) Jonas Björkman (Belarus) Max Mirnyi	7	6	6
(Germany) Rainer Schüttler (Germany) Alexander Waske	5	3	2
3	(The Bahamas) Mark Knowles (France) Michaël Llodra	4	4	4
Q	(Australia) Stephen Huss (South Africa) Wesley Moodie	6	6	6
(India) Leander Paes (Serbia and Montenegro) Nenad Zimonjić	5	6^{8}	6^{8}
4	(Zimbabwe) Wayne Black (Zimbabwe) Kevin Ullyett	7	7^{10}	7^{10}
(Slovakia) Dominik Hrbatý (Slovakia) Michal Mertiňák	6^{2}	4	6^{1}
2	(United States) Bob Bryan (United States) Mike Bryan	7^{7}	6	7^{7}

Semifinals
1	(Sweden) Jonas Björkman (Belarus) Max Mirnyi	6	2	4	6^{4}
Q	(Australia) Stephen Huss (South Africa) Wesley Moodie	2	6	6	7^{7}
4	(Zimbabwe) Wayne Black (Zimbabwe) Kevin Ullyett	6	3	4	4
2	(United States) Bob Bryan (United States) Mike Bryan	4	6	6	6

Final
Q	(Australia) Stephen Huss (South Africa) Wesley Moodie	7^{7}	6	6^{2}	6
2	(United States) Bob Bryan (United States) Mike Bryan	6^{4}	3	7^{7}	3

=== Top half ===
==== Section 1 ====
First round
1	(Sweden) J Björkman (Belarus) M Mirnyi	6	6	6
WC	(United Kingdom) R Barker (United Kingdom) W Barker	3	2	1
(Australia) J Kerr (United States) J Thomas	6	6	7^{8}
(Australia) A Fisher (South Africa) C Haggard	4	4	6^{6}
(Croatia) I Ljubičić (Italy) U Vico	3	4	4
(Romania) V Hănescu (Romania) A Pavel	6	6	6
(Argentina) J Acasuso (Spain) A Martín	3	2	3
13	(Austria) J Knowle (Austria) J Melzer	6	6	6
11	(Czech Republic) C Suk (Czech Republic) P Vízner	6	6^{8}	7^{8}	7^{7}
(United States) J Gimelstob (United States) B MacPhie	3	7^{10}	6^{6}	6^{3}
(Poland) M Fyrstenberg (Poland) M Matkowski	6	6	6
(Argentina) J Mónaco (Spain) F Verdasco	3	2	4
(Czech Republic) J Hernych (Czech Republic) T Zíb	0	7^{7}	7^{9}	4	6
(Czech Republic) J Novák (Czech Republic) P Pála	6	6^{4}	6^{7}	6	3
(Germany) R Schüttler (Germany) A Waske	5	5	7^{7}	7	7
7	(Australia) W Arthurs (Australia) P Hanley	7	7	6^{5}	5	5

Second round
1	(Sweden) J Björkman (Belarus) M Mirnyi	6	6	5	4	6
(Australia) A Fisher (South Africa) C Haggard	0	3	7	6	4
(Romania) V Hănescu (Romania) A Pavel	6^{2}	6^{5}	5
13	(Austria) J Knowle (Austria) J Melzer	7^{7}	7^{7}	7
11	(Czech Republic) C Suk (Czech Republic) P Vízner	6	5	7^{10}	1	7
(Poland) M Fyrstenberg (Poland) M Matkowski	4	7	6^{8}	6	5
(Czech Republic) J Hernych (Czech Republic) T Zíb	4	7^{7}	7^{7}	2	5
(Germany) R Schüttler (Germany) A Waske	6	6^{1}	6^{2}	6	7

Third round
1	(Sweden) J Björkman (Belarus) M Mirnyi	6^{1}	4	6	6	6
13	(Austria) J Knowle (Austria) J Melzer	7^{7}	6	3	4	3
11	(Czech Republic) C Suk (Czech Republic) P Vízner	4	4	6^{6}
(Germany) R Schüttler (Germany) A Waske	6	6	7^{8}

Quarterfinals
1	(Sweden) J Björkman (Belarus) M Mirnyi	7	6	6
(Germany) R Schüttler (Germany) A Waske	5	3	2

==== Section 2 ====
First round
3	(The Bahamas) M Knowles (France) M Llodra	6	6	6
(South Africa) R Koenig (Argentina) S Prieto	2	4	3
(Italy) G Galimberti (Italy) D Sanguinetti	6^{3}	2	3
Q	(Sweden) R Lindstedt (Austria) A Peya	7^{7}	6	6
WC	(United Kingdom) M Hilton (United Kingdom) J Marray	6^{4}	6	7^{7}	7
(France) J Benneteau (France) N Mahut	7^{7}	4	6^{3}	5
(Croatia) I Karlović (Netherlands) R Wassen	7	6	6
16	(Switzerland) Y Allegro (Germany) M Kohlmann	5	3	4
9	(Czech Republic) F Čermák (Czech Republic) L Friedl	7^{7}	6	6
Q	(Paraguay) R Delgado (Brazil) A Sá	6^{4}	3	1
WC	(United Kingdom) A Banks (United Kingdom) A Mackin	5	6^{2}	3
Q	(Finland) T Ketola (Canada) F Niemeyer	7	7^{7}	6
(France) C Saulnier (Belgium) T Vanhoudt	7^{7}	3	2	3
Q	(Australia) S Huss (South Africa) W Moodie	6^{5}	6	6	6
(United States) G Oliver (United States) J Palmer	4	2	7^{7}	3
6	(India) M Bhupathi (Australia) T Woodbridge	6	6	6^{5}	6

Second round
3	(The Bahamas) M Knowles (France) M Llodra	6	7^{7}	6
Q	(Sweden) R Lindstedt (Austria) A Peya	4	6^{1}	4
WC	(United Kingdom) M Hilton (United Kingdom) J Marray	6	3	6	1	5
(Croatia) I Karlović (Netherlands) R Wassen	4	6	2	6	7
9	(Czech Republic) F Čermák (Czech Republic) L Friedl	3	6	7^{7}	6
Q	(Finland) T Ketola (Canada) F Niemeyer	6	3	6^{2}	3
Q	(Australia) S Huss (South Africa) W Moodie	6	7^{7}	6
6	(India) M Bhupathi (Australia) T Woodbridge	3	6^{3}	3

Third round
3	(The Bahamas) M Knowles (France) M Llodra	6	6	5	6
(Croatia) I Karlović (Netherlands) R Wassen	4	4	7	4
9	(Czech Republic) F Čermák (Czech Republic) L Friedl	2	3	4
Q	(Australia) S Huss (South Africa) W Moodie	6	6	6

Quarterfinals
3	(The Bahamas) M Knowles (France) M Llodra	4	4	4
Q	(Australia) S Huss (South Africa) W Moodie	6	6	6

=== Bottom half ===
==== Section 3 ====
First round
5	(India) L Paes (Serbia and Montenegro) N Zimonjić	7^{7}	6^{5}	6	6
(Argentina) L Arnold Ker (Italy) D Bracciali	6^{3}	7^{7}	3	3
(South Africa) J Coetzee (Brazil) R Mello	3	1	7^{7}	6	2
(United States) R Leach (United States) T Parrott	6	6	6^{3}	3	6
(Argentina) M García (Peru) L Horna	3	2	6	3
(Slovakia) K Beck (Czech Republic) J Levinský	6	6	3	6
WC	(United Kingdom) A Murray (United Kingdom) D Sherwood	1	4	4
10	(Czech Republic) M Damm (Argentina) M Hood	6	6	6
14	(Argentina) G Etlis (Argentina) M Rodríguez	6	6	7^{7}
(Italy) E Artoni (Argentina) ~~M Puerta~~	2	1	6^{2}
LL	(United Kingdom) R Hutchins (United Kingdom) M Lee	6	7^{7}	6
(France) J-F Bachelot (France) A Clément	3	6^{2}	2
WC	(United Kingdom) A Bogdanovic (United Kingdom) J Goodall	2	4	4
(Czech Republic) T Berdych (Germany) F Mayer	6	6	6
(Italy) M Bertolini (Italy) F Volandri	1	2	2
4	(Zimbabwe) W Black (Zimbabwe) K Ullyett	6	6	6

Second round
5	(India) L Paes (Serbia and Montenegro) N Zimonjić	3	6	6	7^{7}
(United States) R Leach (United States) T Parrott	6	3	4	6^{3}
(Slovakia) K Beck (Czech Republic) J Levinský	7^{7}	6^{2}	2	6	6
10	(Czech Republic) M Damm (Argentina) M Hood	6^{3}	7^{7}	6	4	4
14	(Argentina) G Etlis (Argentina) M Rodríguez	3	6	0
(France) J-F Bachelot (France) A Clément	6	4	0^{r}
(Czech Republic) T Berdych (Germany) F Mayer	4	1	2
4	(Zimbabwe) W Black (Zimbabwe) K Ullyett	6	6	6

Third round
5	(India) L Paes (Serbia and Montenegro) N Zimonjić	7	6	6
(Slovakia) K Beck (Czech Republic) J Levinský	5	3	4
14	(Argentina) G Etlis (Argentina) M Rodríguez	4	2	6	6^{3}
4	(Zimbabwe) W Black (Zimbabwe) K Ullyett	6	6	3	7^{7}

Quarterfinals
(India) L Paes (Serbia and Montenegro) N Zimonjić	5	6^{8}	6^{8}
4	(Zimbabwe) W Black (Zimbabwe) K Ullyett	7	7^{10}	7^{10}

==== Section 4 ====
First round
8	(Sweden) S Aspelin (Australia) T Perry	6	7^{8}	6^{5}	3	3
(Slovakia) D Hrbatý (Slovakia) M Mertiňák	2	6^{6}	7^{7}	6	6
(Spain) F López (Spain) R Nadal	6	7^{7}	7^{11}
(Czech Republic) T Cibulec (Czech Republic) D Rikl	3	6^{3}	6^{9}
(Luxembourg) G Müller (Belgium) C Rochus	4	5	6	6	2
(Belgium) X Malisse (Belgium) O Rochus	6	7	3	3	6
LL	(Czech Republic) L Dlouhý (Czech Republic) D Škoch	6	4	6^{5}	3
12	(Chile) F González (Chile) N Massú	3	6	7^{7}	6
15	(Israel) J Erlich (Israel) A Ram	6	6^{5}	6	6
WC	(United Kingdom) J Delgado (United Kingdom) A Parmar	4	7^{7}	4	2
(Sweden) J Landsberg (Sweden) R Söderling	6	6	6
(Spain) Á López Morón (Spain) T Robredo	3	2	4
(United States) K Kim (South Korea) H-t Lee	7^{7}	6	4	3	4
WC	(United Kingdom) J Auckland (United Kingdom) D Kiernan	6^{3}	1	6	6	6
(Spain) D Ferrer (Spain) S Ventura Bertomeu	7	3	2	0
2	(United States) B Bryan (United States) M Bryan	5	6	6	6

Second round
(Slovakia) D Hrbatý (Slovakia) M Mertiňák
(Spain) F López (Spain) R Nadal	w/o
(Belgium) X Malisse (Belgium) O Rochus	6	7^{9}	6
12	(Chile) F González (Chile) N Massú	1	6^{7}	2
15	(Israel) J Erlich (Israel) A Ram
(Sweden) J Landsberg (Sweden) R Söderling	w/o
WC	(United Kingdom) J Auckland (United Kingdom) D Kiernan	3	6	3	4
2	(United States) B Bryan (United States) M Bryan	6	3	6	6

Third round
(Slovakia) D Hrbatý (Slovakia) M Mertiňák	6	6	6
(Belgium) X Malisse (Belgium) O Rochus	1	3	3
15	(Israel) J Erlich (Israel) A Ram	3	6^{0}	3
2	(United States) B Bryan (United States) M Bryan	6	7^{7}	6

Quarterfinals
(Slovakia) D Hrbatý (Slovakia) M Mertiňák	6^{2}	4	6^{1}
2	(United States) B Bryan (United States) M Bryan	7^{7}	6	7^{7}
