= 1999 Croatian Bol Ladies Open – Singles =

Singles
- 1999 Croatian Bol Ladies Open

Final
- Champion: (United States) Corina Morariu
- Runner-up: (France) Julie Halard-Decugis
- Score: 6–2, 6–0

Events
Singles	Doubles
← 1998 ·	Croatian Bol Ladies Open	· 2000 →

The 1999 Croatian Bol Ladies Open singles was the singles event of the sixth edition of the Croatian Bol Ladies Open, a WTA Tier IV tournament and the most prestigious women's tennis tournament held in Croatia. Mirjana Lučić was the two-time defending champion, but she did not compete this year.

Corina Morariu won the title after losing in the final the previous two years, defeating first seed Julie Halard-Decugis.

== Seeds ==
1. (France) Julie Halard-Decugis (final)
2. (Croatia) Iva Majoli (second round)
3. (Zimbabwe) Cara Black (first round)
4. (United States) Corina Morariu (champion)
5. (France) Sarah Pitkowski (semifinals)
6. (France) Amélie Cocheteux (first round)
7. (Romania) Cătălina Cristea (first round)
8. (United States) Meghann Shaughnessy (second round)

== Draw ==
=== Key ===
- Q = Qualifier
- WC = Wild card
- LL = Lucky loser
- Alt = Alternate
- SE = Special exempt
- PR = Protected ranking
- ITF = ITF entry
- JE = Junior exempt
- w/o = Walkover
- r = Retired
- d = Defaulted
- SR = Special ranking

=== Finals ===
Semifinals
1	(France) Julie Halard-Decugis	6	6
5	(France) Sarah Pitkowski	3	4
4	(United States) Corina Morariu	6	6
(Spain) Conchita Martínez Granados	2	0

Final
1	(France) Julie Halard-Decugis	2	0
4	(United States) Corina Morariu	6	6

=== Top half ===
First round
1	(France) J Halard-Decugis	6	6
(Kazakhstan) I Selyutina	1	1
(Italy) An Serra Zanetti	6	6
(Italy) Ad Serra Zanetti	2	3
(Austria) B Schwartz	2	4
(Spain) C Torrens Valero	6	6
(Croatia) S Talaja	7^{7}	7^{7}
7	(Romania) C Cristea	6^{2}	6^{3}
3	(Zimbabwe) C Black	3	6^{3}
(Romania) A Vanc	6	7^{7}
LL	(Australia) A Grahame	3	7^{9}	5
(Czech Republic) S Kleinová	6	6^{7}	7
(Argentina) M Díaz Oliva	2	6	7^{7}
(Slovenia) T Križan	6	0	6^{5}
(Slovakia) J Husárová	2	2
5	(France) S Pitkowski	6	6

Second round
1	(France) J Halard-Decugis	6	4	6
(Italy) An Serra Zanetti	1	6	2
(Spain) C Torrens Valero	3	7^{7}	6
(Croatia) S Talaja	6	6^{5}	4
(Romania) A Vanc	2	6	4
(Czech Republic) S Kleinová	6	2	6
(Argentina) M Díaz Oliva	2	0
5	(France) S Pitkowski	6	6

Quarterfinals
1	(France) J Halard-Decugis	6	6^{5}	6
(Spain) C Torrens Valero	2	7^{7}	4
(Czech Republic) S Kleinová	2	1
5	(France) S Pitkowski	6	6

Semifinals
1	(France) J Halard-Decugis	6	6
5	(France) S Pitkowski	3	4

=== Bottom half ===
First round
8	(United States) M Shaughnessy	6	6
(Italy) T Garbin	1	4
(Czech Republic) A Gerši	0	6	7
WC	(Slovenia) T Pisnik	6	4	5
Q	(Argentina) L Masante	7	6
WC	(Croatia) I Bračun	5	3
Q	(Czech Republic) R Kučerová	2	2
4	(United States) C Morariu	6	6
6	(France) A Cocheteux	4	5
(Romania) R Sandu	6	7
Q	(United Kingdom) L Ahl	5	0
(Spain) C Martínez Granados	7	6
(Croatia) J Kostanić	6	1	6
(Slovenia) K Srebotnik	4	6	2
Q	(Czech Republic) Z Hejdová	2	4
2	(Croatia) I Majoli	6	6

Second round
8	(United States) M Shaughnessy	5	3
(Czech Republic) A Gerši	7	6
Q	(Argentina) L Masante	4	0	r
4	(United States) C Morariu	6	3
(Romania) R Sandu	4	2
(Spain) C Martínez Granados	6	6
(Croatia) J Kostanić	6	7
2	(Croatia) I Majoli	2	5

Quarterfinals
(Czech Republic) A Gerši	1	4
4	(United States) C Morariu	6	6
(Spain) C Martínez Granados	7^{7}	7
(Croatia) J Kostanić	6^{4}	5

Semifinals
4	(United States) C Morariu	6	6
(Spain) C Martínez Granados	2	0

== Qualifying ==
=== Seeds ===
1. n.a.
2. (Czech Republic) Michaela Paštiková (second round)
3. (United Kingdom) Lucie Ahl (qualifier)
4. (Australia) Amanda Grahame (qualifying competition, lucky loser)
5. (Poland) Katarzyna Straczy (qualifying competition)
6. (Germany) Syna Schmidle (second round)
7. (Czech Republic) Renata Kučerová (qualifier)
8. (Argentina) Luciana Masante (qualifier)
9. (Croatia) Marijana Kovačević (qualifying competition)

=== Qualifiers ===
1. (Czech Republic) Renata Kučerová
2. (United Kingdom) Lucie Ahl
3. (Argentina) Luciana Masante
4. (Czech Republic) Zuzana Hejdová

=== Lucky losers ===
1. (Australia) Amanda Grahame

== Qualifying draw ==
=== Key ===
- Q = Qualifier
- WC = Wild card
- LL = Lucky loser
- Alt = Alternate
- SE = Special exempt
- PR = Protected ranking
- ITF = ITF entry
- JE = Junior exempt
- w/o = Walkover
- r = Retired
- d = Defaulted
- SR = Special ranking

=== First qualifier ===
First round
9	(Croatia) Marijana Kovačević	6	6
(Croatia) Kristina Pojatina	2	5
WC	(Croatia) Ana Masleša	4	6	4
(Poland) Agnieszka Abram	6	3	6
(Czech Republic) Blanka Kumbárová	6	6
(Austria) Nicole Remis	4	1
(Germany) Eva Belbl	7^{7}	1	2
7	(Czech Republic) Renata Kučerová	6^{4}	6	6

Second round
9	(Croatia) Marijana Kovačević	6	6
(Poland) Agnieszka Abram	2	0
(Czech Republic) Blanka Kumbárová	0	4
7	(Czech Republic) Renata Kučerová	6	6

Qualifying competition
9	(Croatia) Marijana Kovačević	1	2
7	(Czech Republic) Renata Kučerová	6	6

=== Second qualifier ===
First round
3	(United Kingdom) Lucie Ahl	6	7
(Australia) Louise Pleming	1	5
Alt	(Croatia) Iva Kirac
(Czech Republic) Gabriela Navrátilová	w/o
(Slovenia) Ana Škafar	6	3	6
(Croatia) Ivana Kekež	3	6	1
(Slovenia) Vida Mulec	2	4
6	(Germany) Syna Schmidle	6	6

Second round
3	(United Kingdom) Lucie Ahl	6	6
(Czech Republic) Gabriela Navrátilová	4	0
(Slovenia) Ana Škafar	6	6
6	(Germany) Syna Schmidle	3	2

Qualifying competition
3	(United Kingdom) Lucie Ahl	6	6
(Slovenia) Ana Škafar	4	4

=== Third qualifier ===
First round
8	(Argentina) Luciana Masante	6	6
WC	(Croatia) Ivana Abramović	2	3
(Poland) Anna Mogilnicka	0	0
(Slovenia) Nives Ćulum	6	6
WC	(Croatia) Danira Penić	w/o
(Croatia) Maja Murić
(Germany) Nina Nittinger	6^{5}	4
4	(Australia) Amanda Grahame	7^{7}	6

Second round
8	(Argentina) Luciana Masante	2	6	6
(Slovenia) Nives Ćulum	6	4	1
WC	(Croatia) Danira Penić	4	5
4	(Australia) Amanda Grahame	6	7

Qualifying competition
8	(Argentina) Luciana Masante	6	7
4	(Australia) Amanda Grahame	2	5

=== Fourth qualifier ===
First round
5	(Poland) Katarzyna Strączy	6	6
(Ukraine) Irina Nossenko	0	2
(Germany) Denise Hofer	6	4	6
(Germany) Jennifer Tinnacher	0	6	1
(Czech Republic) Zuzana Hejdová	6	4	6
(Croatia) Ivana Višić	2	6	1
(Germany) Magdalena Kučerová
2	(Czech Republic) Michaela Paštiková	w/o

Second round
5	(Poland) Katarzyna Strączy	6	6^{4}	6
(Germany) Denise Hofer	1	7^{7}	2
(Czech Republic) Zuzana Hejdová	6	6
2	(Czech Republic) Michaela Paštiková	4	3

Qualifying competition
5	(Poland) Katarzyna Strączy	4	6	2
(Czech Republic) Zuzana Hejdová	6	1	6
