= 1999 Croatian Bol Ladies Open – Doubles =

Doubles
- 1999 Croatian Bol Ladies Open

Final
- Champion: (Croatia) Jelena Kostanić (Czech Republic) Michaela Paštiková
- Runner-up: (United States) Meghann Shaughnessy (Romania) Andreea Vanc
- Score: 7–5, 6–7^{(1–7)}, 6–2

Events
Singles	Doubles
← 1998 ·	Croatian Bol Ladies Open	· 2000 →

The 1999 Croatian Bol Ladies Open doubles was the doubles event of the sixth edition of the Croatian Bol Ladies Open, a WTA Tier IV tournament and the most prestigious women's tennis tournament held in Croatia. Laura Montalvo and Paola Suárez were the defending champions, Montalvo having won the last three doubles competitions in Bol, but neither competed this year.

Home player Jelena Kostanić teamed up with Czech Michaela Paštiková to win the tournament, defeating Meghann Shaughnessy and Andreea Vanc, 7–5, 6–7^{(1–7)}, 6–2.

== Seeds ==
1. (Romania) Cătălina Cristea / (United States) Corina Morariu (first round)
2. (Zimbabwe) Cara Black / (Kazakhstan) Irina Selyutina (quarterfinals)
3. (Slovenia) Tina Križan / (Slovenia) Katarina Srebotnik (first round)
4. (France) Sarah Pitkowski / (Australia) Louise Pleming (quarterfinals)

== Draw ==
=== Key ===
- Q = Qualifier
- WC = Wild card
- LL = Lucky loser
- Alt = Alternate
- SE = Special exempt
- PR = Protected ranking
- ITF = ITF entry
- JE = Junior exempt
- w/o = Walkover
- r = Retired
- d = Defaulted
- SR = Special ranking

First round
1	(Romania) C Cristea (United States) C Morariu	4	4
(Germany) S Schmidle (Austria) B Schwartz	6	6
(Australia) A Grahame (Germany) N Nittinger	5	6	7
(United Kingdom) L Ahl (Romania) R Sandu	7	4	5
4	(France) S Pitkowski (Australia) L Pleming	6	1	6
(Argentina) M Díaz Oliva (Argentina) L Masante	4	6	2
(Croatia) M Kovačević (Croatia) I Višić	6^{3}	1
(Croatia) J Kostanić (Czech Republic) M Paštiková	7^{7}	6
(Slovenia) N Ćulum (Slovenia) V Mulec	6	1	6
(Croatia) I Kekež (Slovenia) A Škafar	1	6	3
(Slovenia) T Pisnik (Croatia) S Talaja	3	6	7
3	(Slovenia) T Križan (Slovenia) K Srebotnik	6	2	5
(United States) M Shaughnessy (Romania) A Vanc	6	6
(Czech Republic) S Kleinová (Austria) N Remis	1	0
(Czech Republic) R Kučerová (Czech Republic) G Navrátilová	1	6^{3}
2	(Zimbabwe) C Black (Kazakhstan) I Selyutina	6	7^{7}

Quarterfinals
(Germany) S Schmidle (Austria) B Schwartz	6	6
(Australia) A Grahame (Germany) N Nittinger	1	1
4	(France) S Pitkowski (Australia) L Pleming	5	4
(Croatia) J Kostanić (Czech Republic) M Paštiková	7	6
(Slovenia) N Ćulum (Slovenia) V Mulec	1	0
(Slovenia) T Pisnik (Croatia) S Talaja	6	6
(United States) M Shaughnessy (Romania) A Vanc	4	6	6
2	(Zimbabwe) C Black (Kazakhstan) I Selyutina	6	4	3

Semifinals
(Germany) S Schmidle (Austria) B Schwartz
(Croatia) J Kostanić (Czech Republic) M Paštiková	w/o
(Slovenia) T Pisnik (Croatia) S Talaja	4	4
(United States) M Shaughnessy (Romania) A Vanc	6	6

Final
(Croatia) J Kostanić (Czech Republic) M Paštiková	7	6^{1}	6
(United States) M Shaughnessy (Romania) A Vanc	5	7^{7}	2
