= 1999 Croatian Bol Ladies Open =

- Date: 26 April – 2 May
- Edition: 6th
- Category: Tier IV
- Draw: 32S / 16D
- Prize money: $142,500
- Surface: Clay / outdoor
- Location: Bol, Croatia

Champions

Singles
- (United States) Corina Morariu

Doubles
- (Croatia) Jelena Kostanić / (Czech Republic) Michaela Paštiková
← 1998 ·	Croatian Bol Ladies Open	· 2000 →

The 1999 Croatian Bol Ladies Open was a women's tennis tournament played on outdoor clay courts in Bol, Croatia that was part of the Tier IV category of the 1999 WTA Tour. It was the sixth edition of the tournament and was held from 26 April until 2 May 1999. Fourth-seeded Corina Morariu won the singles title and earned $22,000 first-prize money.

== Finals ==
=== Singles ===
(United States) Corina Morariu defeated (France) Julie Halard-Decugis 6–2, 6–0

- It was Morariu's only singles title of her career.

=== Doubles ===
(Croatia) Jelena Kostanić / (Czech Republic) Michaela Paštiková defeated (United States) Meghann Shaughnessy / (Romania) Andreea Vanc 7–5, 6–7^{(1–7)}, 6–2

== Entrants ==
=== Seeds ===
Country	Player	Rank	Seed
FRA	Julie Halard-Decugis	21	1
CRO	Iva Majoli	32	2
ZIM	Cara Black	35	3
USA	Corina Morariu	38	4
FRA	Sarah Pitkowski	36	5
FRA	Amélie Cocheteux	58	6
ROU	Cătălina Cristea	69	7
USA	Meghann Shaughnessy	68	8

=== Other entrants ===
The following players received wildcards into the singles main draw:

- (Slovenia) Tina Pisnik
- (Croatia) Ivana Bračun

The following players received entry from the singles qualifying draw:

- (Argentina) Luciana Masante
- (Czech Republic) Renata Kučerová
- (United Kingdom) Lucie Ahl
- (Czech Republic) Zuzana Hejdová

The following player received entry as a lucky loser:

- (Australia) Amanda Grahame

== See also ==
- 1999 Croatia Open
