= Lenka Tvarošková =

Slovak tennis player

- Country (sports): Slovakia
- Born: 14 February 1982 (age 43); Bratislava, Czechoslovakia
- Prize money: $148,625

Singles
- Career record: 240–239
- Career titles: 1 ITF
- Highest ranking: No. 215 (8 June 2009)

Grand Slam singles results
- Wimbledon: Q1 (2009)
- US Open: Q1 (2009)

Doubles
- Career record: 242–203
- Career titles: 16 ITF
- Highest ranking: No. 127 (5 October 2009)

Lenka Tvarošková (born 14 February 1982) is a Slovak former tennis player.

Tvarošková won one singles title and 16 doubles titles on the ITF Women's Circuit in her career. On 8 June 2009, she reached her best singles ranking of world No. 215. On 5 October 2009, she peaked at No. 127 in the doubles rankings.

Her last match on the ITF Circuit took place in Dubrovnik, Croatia in the doubles draw of a $10k event in October 2012.

== ITF Circuit finals ==
Legend
$50,000 tournaments
$25,000 tournaments
$10,000 tournaments

=== Singles: 5 (1 title, 4 runner-ups) ===
Result	No.	Date	Tournament	Surface	Opponent	Score
Loss	1.	May 2002	ITF Zadar, Croatia	Clay	(Croatia) Ivana Abramović	6–2, 2–6, 5–7
Win	2.	Jul 2002	ITF Monteroni, Italy	Clay	(Slovenia) Kim Kambic	6–3, 6–2
Loss	3.	Nov 2003	ITF Taizhou, China	Hard	(China) Xie Yanze	1–6, 4–6
Loss	4.	Apr 2004	ITF Cavtat, Croatia	Clay	(Czech Republic) Lucie Hradecká	5–7, 0–6
Loss	5.	Jun 2004	ITF Båstad, Sweden	Clay	(Czech Republic) Lucie Šafářová	2–6, 0–6

=== Doubles: 32 (16 titles, 16 runner-ups) ===
Result	No.	Date	Tournament	Surface	Partner	Opponents	Score
Loss	1.	16 July 2000	ITF Sezze, Italy	Clay	(Federal Republic of Yugoslavia) Dina Milosevic	(Italy) Silvia Disderi (Italy) Maria-Letizia Zavagli	4–6, 6–0, 6–7^{(4)}
Loss	2.	24 June 2001	ITF Algiers, Algeria	Clay	(Moldova) Evghenia Ablovatchi	(South Africa) Chanelle Scheepers (South Africa) Karin Vermeulen	6–7^{(2)}, 4–6
Loss	3.	19 August 2001	ITF Valašské Meziříčí, Czech Republic	Clay	(Germany) Isabel Collischonn	(Czech Republic) Petra Raclavská (Czech Republic) Blanka Kumbárová	6–3, 5–7, 2–6
Win	4.	2 September 2001	ITF Mostar, Bosnia and Herzegovina	Clay	(Germany) Maria Jedlickova	(Slovenia) Mojca Mileta (Ukraine) Kateryna Bondarenko	6–4, 6–4
Loss	5.	4 March 2002	ITF Makarska, Croatia	Clay	(Croatia) Ivana Abramović	(Slovenia) Tina Hergold (Israel) Yevgenia Savranska	7–5, 3–6, 5–7
Loss	6.	15 April 2002	ITF Hvar, Croatia	Clay	(Ukraine) Olena Antypina	(Austria) Daniela Klemenschits (Austria) Sandra Klemenschits	6–4, 3–6, 0–6
Win	7.	26 May 2002	ITF Olecko, Poland	Clay	(Slovakia) Martina Babáková	(Czech Republic) Eva Erbová (Romania) Liana Ungur	6–2, 3–6, 6–2
Loss	8.	16 June 2002	ITF Kędzierzyn-Koźle, Poland	Clay	(Slovakia) Martina Babáková	(Ukraine) Valeria Bondarenko (Ukraine) Mariya Koryttseva	3–6, 0–6
Win	9.	7 July 2002	ITF Monteroni, Italy	Clay	(Slovakia) Zuzana Zemenová	(Czech Republic) Iveta Gerlová (Romania) Christiane Hoppmann	6–4, 3–6, 6–4
Win	10.	14 July 2002	Bella Cup, Poland	Clay	(Poland) Anna Bieleń-Żarska	(Czech Republic) Iveta Gerlová (Czech Republic) Zuzana Černá	7–5, 4–6, 6–4
Loss	11.	4 August 2002	ITF Pétange, Luxembourg	Clay	(Slovakia) Dominika Diešková	(Czech Republic) Iveta Gerlová (Czech Republic) Zuzana Černá	6–1, 1–6, 3–6
Win	12.	11 August 2002	ITF Gdynia, Poland	Clay	(Slovakia) Zuzana Zemenová	(Belarus) Darya Kustova (Ukraine) Olena Antypina	3–6, 6–7^{(3)}
Loss	13.	1 September 2002	ITF Bielefeld, Germany	Clay	(Slovakia) Martina Babáková	(Germany) Lisa Fritz (Germany) Lydia Steinbach	5–7, 4–6
Loss	14.	16 March 2003	ITF Amiens, France	Clay (i)	(Slovakia) Martina Babáková	(France) Karla Mraz (France) Aurélie Védy	4–5 ret.
Loss	15.	25 January 2004	Open de l'Isère, France	Hard (i)	(Germany) Antonia Matic	(Germany) Martina Müller (Germany) Stefanie Weis	2–6, 1–6
Loss	16.	15 March 2004	ITF Rome, Italy	Clay	(Czech Republic) Zuzana Hejdová	(Italy) Alice Canepa (Italy) Emily Stellato	6–4, 1–6, 5–7
Loss	17.	5 April 2004	ITF Cavtat, Croatia	Clay	(Serbia and Montenegro) Ljiljana Nanušević	(Croatia) Nadja Pavić (Croatia) Ivana Višić	6–7^{(1)}, 6–7^{(6)}
Loss	18.	24 May 2005	ITF Campobasso, Italy	Clay	(Slovakia) Katarína Kachlíková	(Italy) Giulia Casoni (Morocco) Bahia Mouhtassine	0–6, 5–7
Win	19.	20 June 2005	ITF Périgueux, France	Clay	(Slovakia) Katarína Kachlíková	(Uzbekistan) Akgul Amanmuradova (Germany) Antonia Matic	7–5, 6–1
Loss	20.	11 July 2006	Bella Cup, Poland	Clay	(Romania) Edina Gallovits-Hall	(Slovenia) Andreja Klepač (Belarus) Ekaterina Dzehalevich	6–7^{(5)}, 4–6
Loss	21.	14 February 2007	ITF Prague, Czech Republic	Hard (i)	(Slovakia) Katarína Kachlíková	(Czech Republic) Petra Cetkovská (Czech Republic) Veronika Chvojková	2–6, 3–6
Win	22.	26 March 2007	ITF Patras, Greece	Hard	(Poland) Olga Brózda	(Bosnia and Herzegovina) Mervana Jugić-Salkić (Greece) Anna Koumantou	6–3, 3–1 ret.
Win	23.	21 March 2008	ITF Noida, India	Hard	(Serbia) Teodora Mirčić	(South Africa) Kelly Anderson (South Africa) Chanelle Scheepers	6–2, 6–7^{(7)}, [10–6]
Win	24.	21 June 2008	ITF Istanbul, Turkey	Hard	(Serbia) Teodora Mirčić	(Switzerland) Stefania Boffa (Czech Republic) Nikola Fraňková	7–5, 7–6^{(4)}
Win	25.	23 June 2008	ITF Kristinehamn, Sweden	Clay	(Austria) Patricia Mayr-Achleitner	(Belgium) Tamaryn Hendler (Finland) Emma Laine	6–3, 6–4
Win	26.	22 November 2008	ITF Phoenix, Mauritius	Hard	(Serbia) Teodora Mirčić	(South Africa) Kelly Anderson (South Africa) Natalie Grandin	6–4, 3–6, [10–4]
Win	27.	13 June 2009	ITF Szczecin, Poland	Clay	(Czech Republic) Michaela Paštiková	(United States) Christina McHale (United States) Asia Muhammad	6–2, 7–5
Win	28.	14 June 2010	ITF Bratislava, Slovakia	Clay	(Slovakia) Katarína Kachlíková	(Canada) Gabriela Dabrowski (Slovakia) Chantal Škamlová	6–4, 7–6
Loss	29.	3 October 2011	ITF Solin, Croatia	Clay	(Slovakia) Karin Morgošová	(Czech Republic) Martina Borecká (Czech Republic) Petra Krejsová	6–3, 4–6, [3–10]
Win	30.	15 October 2011	ITF Bol, Croatia	Clay	(Slovakia) Karin Morgošová	(France) Morgane Pons (France) Alice Tisset	6–2, 6–0
Win	31.	25 March 2012	ITF Gonesse, France	Clay (i)	(Slovakia) Karin Morgošová	(France) Brandy Mina (France) Sherazad Reix	7–6^{(4)}, 6–1
Win	32.	23 July 2012	Palić Open, Serbia	Clay	(Slovakia) Karin Morgošová	(Hungary) Csilla Borsányi (Hungary) Ágnes Bukta	5–7, 6–4, [10–8]
