= Zuzana Váleková =

Slovak tennis player

- Country (sports): Slovakia
- Born: 23 August 1979 (age 45); Czechoslovakia
- Retired: 2002
- Prize money: $71,819

Singles
- Career record: 136–112
- Career titles: 2 ITF
- Highest ranking: No. 204 (13 April 1998)

Grand Slam singles results
- US Open: Q1 (1998)

Doubles
- Career record: 148–68
- Career titles: 19 ITF
- Highest ranking: No. 96 (1 November 1999)

Grand Slam doubles results
- Australian Open: 1R (2000)

Zuzana Váleková (Slovak pronunciation: [ˈzuzana ˈʋaːlekɔʋa]; born 23 August 1979) is a former Slovak tennis player.

Váleková won two singles and 19 doubles titles on the ITF Women's Circuit in her career. On 13 April 1998, she reached her best singles ranking of world No. 204. On 1 November 1999, she peaked at No. 96 in the doubles rankings.

Váleková retired from tennis in 2002.

== ITF finals ==
=== Singles: 9 (2–7) ===
$100,000 tournaments
$75,000 tournaments
$50,000 tournaments
$25,000 tournaments
$10,000 tournaments

Result	No.	Date	Tournament	Surface	Opponent	Score
Loss	1.	6 May 1996	Nitra, Slovakia	Clay	(Zimbabwe) Cara Black	w/o
Loss	2.	25 August 1996	Valašské Meziříčí, Czech Republic	Clay	(Czech Republic) Petra Kučová	6–0, 3–6, 2–6
Loss	3.	22 September 1996	Biograd, Croatia	Clay	(Croatia) Maja Palaveršić	6–4, 2–6, 1–6
Loss	4.	29 September 1996	Šibenik, Croatia	Clay	(Slovakia) Eva Šestáková	6–7, 3–6
Win	1.	10 November 1997	Rio de Janeiro, Brazil	Clay	(Slovakia) Ľudmila Cervanová	6–3, 4–6, 6–1
Loss	5.	16 March 1998	Reims, France	Clay	(France) Laurence Andretto	2–6, 1–6
Loss	6.	23 March 1998	Makarska, Croatia	Clay	(Russia) Nadia Petrova	4–6, 2–6
Loss	7.	8 November 1999	Stupava, Slovakia	Hard (i)	(Czech Republic) Ludmila Richterová	3–6, 1–6
Win	2.	14 February 2000	Faro, Portugal	Hard	(France) Camille Pin	6–4, 6–3

=== Doubles: 31 (19–12) ===
Result	No.	Date	Tournament	Surface	Partner	Opponents	Score
Loss	1.	6 May 1996	Nitra, Slovakia	Clay	(Slovakia) Gabriela Voleková	(Bulgaria) Teodora Nedeva (Belarus) Vera Zhukovets	w/o
Loss	2.	25 August 1996	Valašské Meziříčí, Czech Republic	Clay	(Slovakia) Ľudmila Cervanová	(Czech Republic) Gabriela Chmelinová (Czech Republic) Sabine Radevicová	7–6, 3–6, 3–6
Win	3.	15 September 1996	Zadar, Croatia	Clay	(Slovakia) Ľudmila Cervanová	(Czech Republic) Blanka Kumbárová (Czech Republic) Petra Plačková	6–3, 6–4
Loss	4.	22 September 1996	Biograd, Croatia	Clay	(Slovakia) Ľudmila Cervanová	(Slovakia) Michaela Hasanová (Slovakia) Martina Nedelková	6–2, 4–6, 5–7
Loss	5.	17 November 1996	São Paulo, Brazil	Clay	(Slovakia) Ľudmila Cervanová	(Zimbabwe) Cara Black (Kazakhstan) Irina Selyutina	6–4, 4–6, 3–6
Win	6.	7 April 1997	Hvar, Croatia	Clay	(Slovakia) Patrícia Marková	(United Kingdom) Julie Pullin (United Kingdom) Amanda Wainwright	7–6^{(7–3)}, 6–4
Win	7.	17 April 1997	Dubrovnik, Croatia	Clay	(Slovakia) Patrícia Marková	(Czech Republic) Milena Nekvapilová (Czech Republic) Hana Šromová	2–6, 7–5, 6–4
Win	8.	23 June 1997	Plzeň, Czech Republic	Clay	(Slovakia) Ľudmila Cervanová	(Czech Republic) Petra Kučová (Czech Republic) Eva Krejčová	5–7, 6–1, 6–2
Win	9.	4 August 1997	Carthage, Tunisia	Clay	(Spain) Alicia Ortuño	(Spain) Eva Bes (Spain) Elena Salvador	4–6, 6–4, 6–4
Win	10.	10 November 1997	Rio de Janeiro, Brazil	Clay	(Slovakia) Patrícia Marková	(Czech Republic) Monika Maštalířová (Argentina) Paula Racedo	6–0, 6–7^{(4–7)}, 6–2
Win	11.	19 January 1998	Miami, United States	Clay	(United States) Lilia Osterloh	(Switzerland) Aliénor Tricerri (Russia) Alina Jidkova	6–4, 6–4
Loss	12.	23 March 1998	Makarska, Croatia	Clay	(Slovakia) Ľudmila Cervanová	(Croatia) Jelena Kostanić Tošić (Slovenia) Katarina Srebotnik	3–6, 1–6
Loss	13.	31 August 1998	Sofia, Bulgaria	Clay	(Romania) Magda Mihalache	(Bulgaria) Lubomira Bacheva (Netherlands) Maaike Koutstaal	1–6, 5–7
Win	14.	23 November 1998	Lima, Peru	Clay	(Slovenia) Katarina Srebotnik	(Italy) Alice Canepa (Spain) Conchita Martínez Granados	6–7^{(4–7)}, 7–5, 6–4
Win	15.	30 November 1998	Bogotá, Colombia	Clay	(Slovenia) Katarina Srebotnik	(Colombia) Mariana Mesa (Colombia) Fabiola Zuluaga	6–3, 6–4
Win	16.	30 November 1998	Cali, Colombia	Clay	(Slovenia) Katarina Srebotnik	(Argentina) Laura Montalvo (Spain) Alicia Ortuño	2–6, 6–3, 6–2
Win	17.	11 January 1999	Miami, United States	Hard	(Slovenia) Katarina Srebotnik	(Czech Republic) Olga Vymetálková (Czech Republic) Gabriela Chmelinová	4–6, 6–4, 7–5
Win	18.	18 January 1999	Boca Raton, United States	Hard	(Slovenia) Katarina Srebotnik	(United States) Dawn Buth (United States) Rebecca Jensen	4–6, 6–4, 6–1
Win	19.	25 January 1999	Clearwater, United States	Hard	(Slovenia) Katarina Srebotnik	(United States) Karin Miller (United States) Jean Okada	6–2, 6–0
Win	20.	21 June 1999	Sopot, Poland	Clay	(Romania) Magda Mihalache	(Czech Republic) Lenka Cenková (Belarus) Nadejda Ostrovskaya	6–2, 6–4
Loss	21.	2 August 1999	Kharkiv, Ukraine	Clay	(Russia) Ekaterina Sysoeva	(Belarus) Nadejda Ostrovskaya (Ukraine) Tatiana Perebiynis	7–5, 3–6, 3–6
Loss	22.	23 August 1999	Bucharest, Romania	Clay	(Belarus) Nadejda Ostrovskaya	(Spain) Lourdes Domínguez Lino (Spain) Anabel Medina Garrigues	5–7, 2–6
Win	23.	4 October 1999	Batumi, Georgia	Carpet (i)	(Romania) Magda Mihalache	(Romania) Cătălina Cristea (South Africa) Surina De Beer	6–4, 3–6, 6–4
Loss	24.	11 October 1999	Welwyn, Great Britain	Carpet (i)	(Romania) Magda Mihalache	(Slovenia) Maja Matevžič (Serbia and Montenegro) Dragana Zarić	6–7^{(1–7)}, 7–5, 2–6
Loss	25.	18 October 1999	Southampton, Great Britain	Carpet (i)	(Romania) Magda Mihalache	(United Kingdom) Julie Pullin (United Kingdom) Lorna Woodroffe	3–6, 2–6
Win	26.	27 March 2000	Amiens, France	Clay (i)	(Romania) Magda Mihalache	(Argentina) Mariana Díaz Oliva (Switzerland) Aliénor Tricerri	6–2, 6–4
Win	27.	17 July 2000	Puchheim, Germany	Clay	(Bulgaria) Svetlana Krivencheva	(Germany) Angelika Bachmann (Austria) Melanie Schnell	7–5, 3–6, 7–5
Win	28.	18 June 2001	Lenzerheide, Switzerland	Clay	(Germany) Kirstin Freye	(Argentina) Erica Krauth (Argentina) Vanesa Krauth	3–6, 6–3, 6–2
Win	29.	25 June 2001	Mont-de-Marsan, France	Clay	(Netherlands) Anousjka van Exel	(Czech Republic) Renata Kučerová (Czech Republic) Hana Šromová	6–1, 6–1
Loss	30.	15 October 2001	Cairns, Australia	Hard	(Netherlands) Mariëlle Hoogland	(Australia) Lisa McShea (Australia) Trudi Musgrave	4–6, 3–6
Loss	31.	29 October 2001	Mackay, Australia	Hard	(Netherlands) Mariëlle Hoogland	(Australia) Lisa McShea (Australia) Trudi Musgrave	2–6, 3–6
