= Milena Nekvapilová =

Czech tennis player

- Country (sports): Czech Republic
- Born: 9 May 1977 (age 47); Czechoslovakia
- Turned pro: 1994
- Retired: 2009
- Plays: Right-handed (two-handed backhand)
- Prize money: $70,969

Singles
- Career record: 165–138
- Career titles: 4 ITF
- Highest ranking: No. 214 (17 November 1997)

Grand Slam singles results
- US Open: Q1 (1998)

Doubles
- Career record: 184–108
- Career titles: 21 ITF
- Highest ranking: No. 146 (22 February 1999)

Milena Nekvapilová (born 9 May 1977) is a Czech former tennis player.

She has career-high WTA rankings of 214 in singles, achieved on 17 November 1997, and 146 in doubles, set on 22 February 1999. Nekvapilová won four singles titles and 21 doubles titles on the ITF Women's Circuit.

She made her WTA Tour main-draw debut in the doubles event of the 1999 Belgian Open partnering Hana Šromová.

Nekvapilová retired from professional tennis in 2009.

== ITF finals ==
$100,000 tournaments
$75,000 tournaments
$50,000 tournaments
$25,000 tournaments
$10,000 tournaments

=== Singles: 8 (4–4) ===
Result	W-L	Date	Tournament	Surface	Opponent	Score
Win	1–0	13 April 1997	ITF Hvar, Croatia	Clay	(Czech Republic) Helena Vildová	7–6^{(2)}, 6–4
Win	2–0	20 April 1997	ITF Dubrovnik, Croatia	Clay	(New Zealand) Pavlina Nola	6–2, 0–6, 6–2
Win	3–0	15 June 1997	ITF Kędzierzyn-Koźle, Poland	Clay	(Czech Republic) Zuzana Hejdová	6–3, 2–6, 6–3
Loss	3–1	22 June 1997	ITF Doksy, Czech Republic	Clay	(Czech Republic) Kateřina Kroupová-Šišková	3–6, 6–3, 6–7^{(3)}
Loss	3–2	14 June 1998	ITF Kędzierzyn-Koźle, Poland	Clay	(Czech Republic) Zuzana Ondrášková	6–0, 1–6, 2–6
Loss	3–3	21 June 1998	ITF Doksy, Czech Republic	Clay	(Czech Republic) Jana Hlaváčková	6–3, 2–6, 2–6
Win	4–3	13 June 1999	ITF Doksy, Czech Republic	Clay	(Germany) Veronika Martinek	6–1, 7–6^{(5)}
Loss	4–4	19 August 2001	ITF Valašské Meziříčí, Czech Republic	Clay	(Poland) Katarzyna Strączy	6–7^{(3)}, 6–4, 2–6

=== Doubles: 41 (21–20) ===
Result	No.	Date	Tournament	Surface	Partner	Opponents	Score
Win	1.	26 September 1994	ITF Bratislava, Slovakia	Clay	(Czech Republic) Martina Špačková	(Czech Republic) Libuše Průšová (Czech Republic) Alena Vašková	7–6^{(6)}, 6–3
Loss	1.	17 July 1995	Toruń, Poland	Clay	(Czech Republic) Jana Macurová	(Czech Republic) Monika Maštalířová (Ukraine) Natalia Nemchinova	3–6, 6–7^{(2)}
Win	2.	7 August 1995	Paderborn, Germany	Clay	(Czech Republic) Sylva Nesvadbová	(Russia) Anna Linkova (Czech Republic) Monika Maštalířová	6–1, 6–4
Win	3.	14 August 2005	Wahlscheid, Germany	Clay	(Czech Republic) Sylva Nesvadbová	(Germany) Angelika Rösch (Ukraine) Tanja Tsiganii	2–6, 6–4, 6–4
Win	4.	4 September 2005	Poreč, Croatia	Clay	(Czech Republic) Sylva Nesvadbová	(Croatia) Kristina Pojatina (Croatia) Petra Rihtaric	6–4, 6–1
Win	5.	11 September 2005	Umag, Croatia	Clay	(Czech Republic) Sylva Nesvadbová	(Czech Republic) Karin Baleková (Czech Republic) Petra Plačková	6–4, 6–4
Loss	2.	27 November 1995	Salzburg, Austria	Carpet (i)	(Czech Republic) Sylva Nesvadbová	(Austria) Evelyn Fauth (Austria) Barbara Schwartz	7–6^{(1)}, 6–7^{(6)}, 3–6
Loss	3.	4 December 1995	Přerov, Czech Republic	Carpet (i)	(Czech Republic) Sylva Nesvadbová	(Czech Republic) Olga Vymetálková (Slovakia) Martina Nedelková	5–7, 6–3, 6–4
Loss	4.	17 December 1995	Ostrava, Czech Republic	Carpet (i)	(Czech Republic) Olga Vymetálková	(Czech Republic) Monika Kratochvílová (Slovakia) Martina Nedelková	4–6, 6–3, 3–6
Win	6.	24 February 1996	Nuremberg, Germany	Carpet (i)	(Czech Republic) Sylva Nesvadbová	(Slovakia) Michaela Hasanová (Slovakia) Martina Nedelková	6–4, 7–5
Loss	5.	28 July 1996	Valladolid, Spain	Hard	(Czech Republic) Monika Maštalířová	(Israel) Shiri Burstein (Israel) Limor Gabai	2–6, 4–6
Loss	6.	14 December 1996	Přerov, Czech Republic	Hard (i)	(Czech Republic) Hana Šromová	(Czech Republic) Kateřina Šišková (Czech Republic) Eva Melicharová	2–6, 6–7^{(5)}
Loss	7.	25 January 1997	Istanbul, Turkey	Hard (i)	(Czech Republic) Monika Maštalířová	(Czech Republic) Jana Ondrouchová (Czech Republic) Hana Šromová	2–6, 1–6
Win	7.	28 February 1997	Jaffa, Israel	Hard	(Czech Republic) Hana Šromová	(Hungary) Nóra Köves (Slovakia) Patrícia Marková	6–4, 6–2
Loss	8.	8 March 1997	Tel Aviv, Israel	Hard	(Czech Republic) Hana Šromová	(Netherlands) Henriëtte van Aalderen (Netherlands) Andrea van den Hurk	6–0, 3–6, 4–6
Loss	9.	19 April 1997	Dubrovnik, Croatia	Clay	(Czech Republic) Hana Šromová	(Slovakia) Patrícia Marková (Slovakia) Zuzana Váleková	6–2, 5–7, 4–6
Win	8.	26 April 1997	Prostějov, Czech Republic	Clay	(Czech Republic) Sylva Nesvadbová	(Czech Republic) Olga Vymetálková (Czech Republic) Hana Šromová	6–2, 7–6^{(6)}
Win	9.	18 May 1997	Prešov, Slovakia	Clay	(Czech Republic) Hana Šromová	(Czech Republic) Olga Vymetálková (Czech Republic) Jana Macurová	2–6, 6–4, 6–2
Win	10.	31 May 1997	Warsaw, Poland	Clay	(Czech Republic) Hana Šromová	(Czech Republic) Olga Vymetálková (Czech Republic) Jana Ondrouchová	w/o
Win	11.	14 June 1997	Kędzierzyn-Koźle, Poland	Clay	(Czech Republic) Jana Macurová	(Czech Republic) Libuše Průšová (Czech Republic) Zuzana Průšová	6–4, 6–2
Win	12.	26 October 1997	Joué-lès-Tours, France	Hard (i)	(Czech Republic) Hana Šromová	(Denmark) Eva Dyrberg (Denmark) Maiken Pape	5–7, 6–3, 6–4
Win	13.	2 April 1998	Athens, Greece	Clay	(Czech Republic) Hana Šromová	(Czech Republic) Jana Macurová (Czech Republic) Gabriela Chmelinová	6–3, 7–5
Loss	10.	13 June 1998	Kędzierzyn-Koźle, Poland	Clay	(Czech Republic) Hana Šromová	(Poland) Katharzyna Teodorowicz (Poland) Anna Bieleń-Żarska	6–7^{(5)}, 1–6
Loss	11.	15 June 1998	Doksy, Czech Republic	Clay	(Czech Republic) Hana Šromová	(Czech Republic) Zuzana Lešenarová (Czech Republic) Lucie Šteflová	3–6, 7–5, 2–6
Win	14.	15 August 1998	Bratislava, Slovakia	Clay	(Czech Republic) Hana Šromová	(Czech Republic) Lenka Němečková (Slovakia) Katarína Studeníková	6–2, 6–4
Win	15.	22 May 1999	Salzburg, Austria	Clay	(Czech Republic) Hana Šromová	(Belgium) Cindy Schuurmans (Czech Republic) Magdalena Zděnovcová	6–3, 6–4
Win	16.	12 June 1999	Doksy, Czech Republic	Clay	(Czech Republic) Gabriela Chmelinová	(Australia) Rochelle Rosenfield (Poland) Anna Bieleń-Żarska	2–6, 6–3, 6–4
Loss	12.	3 June 2000	Doksy, Czech Republic	Clay	(Czech Republic) Jana Macurová	(Czech Republic) Andrea Plačková (Czech Republic) Pavlina Slitrová	3–6, 4–6
Win	17.	24 June 2000	Sopot, Poland	Clay	(Czech Republic) Hana Šromová	(Germany) Marketa Kochta (Czech Republic) Ludmila Richterová	6–3, 6–2
Win	18.	2 June 2001	Doksy, Czech Republic	Clay	(Czech Republic) Hana Šromová	(Czech Republic) Olga Vymetálková (Czech Republic) Gabriela Chmelinová	2–6, 6–4, 6–1
Win	19.	23 June 2001	Gorizia, Italy	Clay	(Czech Republic) Hana Šromová	(Ukraine) Tatiana Kovalchuk (Romania) Andreea Ehritt-Vanc	5–7, 6–1, 6–1
Loss	13.	15 July 2001	Darmstadt, Germany	Clay	(Czech Republic) Hana Šromová	(Germany) Magdalena Kučerová (Germany) Lydia Steinbach	1–6, 2–6
Loss	14.	11 August 2001	Rimini, Italy	Clay	(Czech Republic) Hana Šromová	(Hungary) Petra Mandula (Austria) Patricia Wartusch	2–6, 1–6
Loss	15.	22 October 2001	Opole, Poland	Carpet (i)	(Czech Republic) Hana Šromová	(Germany) Magdalena Kučerová (Germany) Lydia Steinbach	3–6, 2–6
Win	20.	5 November 2001	Cairo, Egypt	Clay	(Czech Republic) Hana Šromová	(Czech Republic) Zuzana Hejdová (Slovakia) Gabriela Voleková	6–3, 6–2
Loss	16.	28 July 2002	Český Krumlov, Czech Republic	Clay	(Czech Republic) Gabriela Chmelinová	(Slovenia) Tina Hergold (Hungary) Katalin Marosi	6–7^{(2)}, 5–7
Loss	17.	24 August 2002	Valašské Meziříčí, Czech Republic	Clay	(Czech Republic) Hana Šromová	(Czech Republic) Renata Kučerová (Czech Republic) Gabriela Chmelinová	4–6, 1–6
Loss	18.	28 September 2002	Sopron, Hungary	Clay	(Czech Republic) Hana Šromová	(Austria) Daniela Klemenschits (Austria) Sandra Klemenschits	7–6^{(2)}, 2–6, 2–6
Loss	19.	5 October 2002	Trenčianske Teplice, Slovakia	Clay	(Czech Republic) Hana Šromová	(Czech Republic) Jana Macurová (Czech Republic) Gabriela Chmelinová	1–2 ret.
Loss	20.	30 August 2003	Maribor, Slovenia	Clay	(Czech Republic) Lucie Kriegsmannová	(Czech Republic) Iveta Gerlová (Slovakia) Zuzana Zemenová	0–6, 1–6
Win	21.	4 October 2003	ITF Trenčianske Teplice, Slovakia	Clay	(Slovakia) Zuzana Zemenová	(Czech Republic) Blanka Kumbárová (Czech Republic) Tereza Szafnerová	1–6, 6–1, 7–5
