= Anna Bieleń-Żarska =

Polish tennis player (born 1979)

- Country (sports): Poland
- Born: 22 July 1979 (age 47) Kędzierzyn-Koźle, Poland
- Height: 1.74 m (5 ft 9 in)
- Retired: 2005
- Prize money: $108,692

Singles
- Career record: 229–202
- Career titles: 4 ITF
- Highest ranking: No. 146 (3 April 2000)

Grand Slam singles results
- Australian Open: Q1 (2000, 2001)
- French Open: Q2 (2000)
- Wimbledon: Q1 (2000)
- US Open: Q2 (2000)

Doubles
- Career record: 81–88
- Career titles: 5 ITF
- Highest ranking: No. 176 (30 July 2001)

Team competitions
- Fed Cup: 6–7
Medal record
Representing Poland
Summer Universiade
| Silver medal – second place | 1999 Palma de Mallorca | Women's doubles |

Anna Bieleń-Żarska (born 22 July 1979) is a former Polish tennis player.

Bieleń-Żarska was born in Kędzierzyn-Koźle. She won four singles and five doubles titles on the ITF Women's Circuit. On 3 April 2000, she reached her best singles ranking of world No. 146. On 30 July 2001, she peaked at No. 176 in the doubles rankings.

== ITF finals ==
=== Singles: 10 (4–6) ===
$100,000 tournaments
$75,000 tournaments
$50,000 tournaments
$25,000 tournaments
$10,000 tournaments

| Result | No. | Date | Location | Surface | Opponent | Score |
|---|---|---|---|---|---|---|
| Win | 1. | 1 September 1996 | Warsaw, Poland | Clay | (Czech Republic) Zuzana Lešenarová | 6–1, 6–3 |
| Loss | 1. | 11 May 1997 | Nitra, Slovakia | Clay | (Czech Republic) Jana Macurová | 4–6, 6–4, 3–6 |
| Loss | 2. | 26 October 1997 | Jūrmala, Latvia | Carpet (i) | (Germany) Mirja Wagner | 4–6, 6–3, 1–6 |
| Loss | 3. | 24 August 1998 | Plzeň, Czech Republic | Clay | (Czech Republic) Libuše Průšová | 4–6, 3–6 |
| Win | 2. | 20 September 1998 | Biograd na Moru, Croatia | Clay | (Russia) Anastasia Myskina | 6–4, 5–7, 7–6 |
| Win | 3. | 14 June 1999 | Poznań, Poland | Clay | (Slovakia) Stanislava Hrozenská | 7–5, 6–3 |
| Win | 4. | 27 June 1999 | Sopot, Poland | Clay | (Romania) Magda Mihalache | 6–2, 6–3 |
| Loss | 4. | 3 October 1999 | Porto, Portugal | Clay | (Bulgaria) Desislava Topalova | 6–7, 6–4, 5–7 |
| Loss | 5. | 8 November 1999 | Rungsted, Denmark | Carpet (i) | (Belarus) Nadejda Ostrovskaya | 4–6, 6–2, 3–6 |
| Loss | 6. | 10 June 2002 | Kędzierzyn-Koźle, Poland | Clay | (Uruguay) Ana Lucía Migliarini de León | 6–2, 1–6, 6–7^{(4–7)} |

=== Doubles: 13 (5–8) ===
| Result | No. | Date | Location | Surface | Partner | Opponents | Score |
|---|---|---|---|---|---|---|---|
| Loss | 1. | 1 September 1996 | Warsaw, Poland | Clay | (Czech Republic) Pavlína Bartůňková | (Australia) Sally-Ann Cuttler (Australia) Anna Klim | 2–6, 6–2, 4–6 |
| Loss | 2. | 20 October 1996 | Šiauliai, Lithuania | Carpet (i) | (Poland) Katarzyna Teodorowicz | (Ukraine) Natalia Bondarenko (Belarus) Marina Stets | 1–6, 4–6 |
| Loss | 3. | 8 June 1997 | Bytom, Poland | Clay | (Poland) Katarzyna Teodorowicz | (Czech Republic) Kateřina Kroupová-Šišková (Czech Republic) Jana Ondrouchová | 4–6, 2–6 |
| Win | 1. | 21 December 1997 | Cascais, Portugal | Carpet (i) | (Germany) Kirstin Freye | (Germany) Angelika Bachmann (Romania) Magda Mihalache | 6–7, 6–0, 6–4 |
| Win | 2. | 14 June 1998 | Kędzierzyn-Koźle, Poland | Clay | (Poland) Katarzyna Teodorowicz | (Czech Republic) Milena Nekvapilová (Czech Republic) Hana Šromová | 7–6, 6–1 |
| Loss | 4. | 23 August 1998 | Valašské Meziříčí, Czech Republic | Clay | (Poland) Katarzyna Teodorowicz | (Germany) Magdalena Kučerová (Czech Republic) Jana Pospíšilová | 3–6, 6–4, 6–7 |
| Loss | 5. | 7 September 1998 | Zadar, Croatia | Clay | (Czech Republic) Libuše Průšová | (France) Camille Pin (Croatia) Ivana Višić | 6–7^{(3–7)}, 6–7^{(4–7)} |
| Win | 3. | 1 March 1999 | Buchen, Germany | Carpet (i) | (Hungary) Adrienn Hegedűs | (Germany) Angelika Bachmann (Germany) Lisa Fritz | 6–4, 6–2 |
| Win | 4. | 6 June 1999 | Kędzierzyn-Koźle, Poland | Clay | (Poland) Katarzyna Teodorowicz | (Ukraine) Alona Bondarenko (Ukraine) Valeria Bondarenko | 5–7, 6–4, 6–1 |
| Loss | 6. | 7 June 1999 | Doksy, Czech Republic | Clay | (Australia) Rochelle Rosenfield | (Czech Republic) Gabriela Chmelinová (Czech Republic) Milena Nekvapilová | 6–2, 3–6, 4–6 |
| Loss | 7. | 16 August 1999 | Valašské Meziříčí, Czech Republic | Clay | (Czech Republic) Libuše Průšová | (Czech Republic) Gabriela Chmelinová (Czech Republic) Petra Kučová | 5–7, 6–2, 3–6 |
| Loss | 8. | 12 June 2000 | Marseille, France | Clay | (Bulgaria) Svetlana Krivencheva | (Italy) Alice Canepa (Argentina) Mariana Díaz Oliva | 2–6, 3–6 |
| Win | 5. | 14 July 2002 | Toruń, Poland | Clay | (Slovakia) Lenka Tvarošková | (Czech Republic) Zuzana Černá (Czech Republic) Iveta Gerlová | 7–5, 4–6, 6–4 |
