= Eva Krejčová =

Czech tennis player

- Full name: Eva Krejčová
- Country (sports): Czech Republic
- Born: 12 November 1976 (age 48) Rokycany, Czechoslovakia
- Plays: Right-handed
- Prize money: $107,150

Singles
- Career titles: 5 ITF
- Highest ranking: No. 184 (10 September 2001)

Doubles
- Highest ranking: No. 255 (12 February 2001)

Eva Krejčová (born 12 November 1976) is a Czech former professional tennis player.

== Biography ==
Born in Rokycany, Krejčová is the only child of Ilona and Zbynen. At the age of 10 she was introduced to tennis by her father.

Krejčová, a right-handed player, made her WTA Tour main draw debut at the Prague Open in 1993 and was beaten in the first round by Germany's Silke Frankl.

In 1994 she won the first of her five ITF singles titles, at Staré Splavy in her home country.

A regular competitor in the qualifying events of grand slam tournaments, including 10 in a row between 2000 and 2002, she was never able to make a main draw.

She retired from professional tennis after the 2002 US Open qualifying tournament.

== ITF finals ==
$25,000 tournaments
$10,000 tournaments

=== Singles (5–5) ===
Result	No.	Date	Tournament	Surface	Opponent	Score
Loss	1.	7 February 1993	Rungsted, Denmark	Carpet	(Germany) Cora Hofmann	3–6, 3–6
Loss	2.	13 December 1993	Přerov, Czech Republic	Hard	(Czech Republic) Petra Langrová	2–6, 6–7^{(2)}
Win	1.	20 June 1994	Staré Splavy, Czech Republic	Clay	(France) Virginie Massart	1–6, 6–0, 6–4
Loss	3.	27 June 1994	Průhonice, Czech Republic	Clay	(Czech Republic) Klára Bláhová	6–7^{(2)}, 4–6
Win	2.	13 October 1996	Nicosia, Cyprus	Clay	(Netherlands) Maaike Koutstaal	6–2, 7–6^{(6)}
Win	3.	19 October 1997	Nicosia, Cyprus	Clay	(Hungary) Kira Nagy	6–3, 2–6, 6–4
Loss	4.	22 March 1998	Canberra, Australia	Grass	(Australia) Amanda Grahame	3–6, 4–6
Loss	5.	29 March 1998	Bendigo, Australia	Grass	(Australia) Amanda Grahame	3–6, 2–6
Win	4.	25 September 2000	Saga, Japan	Grass	(Japan) Rika Fujiwara	7–6^{(3)}, 6–2
Win	5.	29 July 2001	Les Contamines, France	Hard	(France) Lea Ghirardi	6–1, 6–2

=== Doubles (2–4) ===
Result	No.	Date	Location	Surface	Partner	Opponents	Score
Loss	1.	27 June 1994	Průhonice, Czech Republic	Clay	(Czech Republic) Eva Erbová	(Czech Republic) Monika Kratochvílová (Czech Republic) Martina Hautová	3–6, 6–4, 1–6
Win	1.	12 December 1994	Přerov, Czech Republic	Hard (i)	(Czech Republic) Olga Hostáková	(Russia) Anna Linkova (Slovakia) Henrieta Nagyová	6–4, 6–4
Loss	2.	23 June 1997	Plzeň, Czech Republic	Clay	(Czech Republic) Petra Raclavská	(Slovakia) Ľudmila Cervanová (Slovakia) Zuzana Váleková	7–5, 1–6, 2–6
Loss	3.	19 October 1997	Nicosia, Cyprus	Clay	(Slovakia) Ľudmila Cervanová	(Italy) Katia Altilia (Denmark) Charlotte Aagaard	4–6, 5–7
Loss	4.	1 October 2000	Saga, Japan	Carpet	(South Africa) Nannie de Villiers	(United States) Amanda Augustus (Australia) Amy Jensen	4–6, 3–6
Win	2.	3 September 2000	Plzeň, Czech Republic	Clay	(Czech Republic) Helena Vildová	(Czech Republic) Gabriela Chmelinová (Czech Republic) Alena Vašková	5–3, 4–1, 4–2
