= Alena Vašková =

Czech tennis player

- Country (sports): Czech Republic
- Born: 8 November 1975 (age 50) Rožnov pod Radhoštěm, Czechoslovakia
- Height: 1.75 m (5 ft 9 in)
- Turned pro: 1992
- Retired: 2005
- Plays: Right-handed (two-handed backhand)
- Prize money: $236,165

Singles
- Career record: 276–207
- Career titles: 8 ITF
- Highest ranking: No. 115 (9 July 2001)

Grand Slam singles results
- Australian Open: Q3 (2003)
- French Open: Q3 (2002)
- Wimbledon: Q3 (2003)
- US Open: 1R (2000, 2003)

Doubles
- Career record: 120–101
- Career titles: 11 ITF
- Highest ranking: No. 135 (22 April 2002)

Team competitions
- Fed Cup: 0–2

Alena Vašková (married Neštická; born 8 November 1975) is a Czech retired tennis player.

She won eight singles and eleven doubles titles on the ITF Circuit. On 9 July 2001, she reached her best singles ranking of world No. 115. On 22 April 2002, she peaked at No. 135 in the doubles rankings.

In 2001, Vašková made two appearances for the Czech Republic in Fed Cup competition.

== WTA career finals ==
=== Doubles: 1 (runner-up) ===
| Result | Date | Tournament | Surface | Partner | Opponents | Score |
|---|---|---|---|---|---|---|
| Loss | Sep 2001 | Bell Challenge, Canada | Carpet (i) | (Czech Republic) Klára Koukalová | (United States) Samantha Reeves (Italy) Adriana Serra Zanetti | 5–7, 6–4, 3–6 |

== ITF Circuit finals ==
$50,000 tournaments
$25,000 tournaments
$10,000 tournaments

=== Singles: 14 (8–6) ===
| Result | No. | Date | Tournament | Surface | Opponent | Score |
|---|---|---|---|---|---|---|
| Loss | 1. | 14 August 1994 | ITF Szczecin, Poland | Clay | (Poland) Magdalena Grzybowska | 5–7, 2–6 |
| Loss | 2. | 16 October 1994 | ITF Burgdorf, Switzerland | Clay | (Czech Republic) Adriana Gerši | 4–6, 4–6 |
| Win | 3. | 23 October 1994 | ITF Langenthal, Switzerland | Clay | (France) Anne-Sophie Bittighoffer | 6–3, 7–6 |
| Loss | 4. | 11 December 1994 | ITF Vítkovice, Czech Republic | Hard (i) | (Czech Republic) Lenka Cenková | 4–6, 7–5, 4–6 |
| Win | 5. | 27 August 1995 | ITF Valašské Meziříčí, Czech Republic | Clay | (Czech Republic) Jana Macurová | 7–5, 5–7, 7–5 |
| Loss | 6. | 18 August 1996 | ITF Wahlscheid, Germany | Clay | (Spain) Magüi Serna | 2–6, 3–6 |
| Win | 7. | 9 November 1998 | ITF Biel, Switzerland | Carpet (i) | (Czech Republic) Zuzana Ondrášková | 6–3, 6–1 |
| Win | 8. | 20 December 1998 | ITF Průhonice, Czech Republic | Carpet (i) | (Germany) Anca Barna | 6–4, 6–3 |
| Win | 9. | 17 July 2000 | ITF Puchheim, Germany | Clay | (Germany) Vanessa Henke | 6–1, 6–1 |
| Win | 10. | 25 September 2000 | ITF Verona, Italy | Clay | (Czech Republic) Michaela Paštiková | 6–3, 6–0 |
| Win | 11. | 3 September 2000 | ITF Plzeň, Czech Republic | Clay | (Hungary) Adrienn Hegedűs | 5–4^{(7)}, 4–2, 4–1 |
| Loss | 12. | 5 May 2002 | ITF Cagnes-sur-Mer, France | Clay | (France) Émilie Loit | 5–7, 6–3, 4–6 |
| Loss | 13. | 19 May 2002 | ITF Szczecin, Poland | Clay | (Ukraine) Yuliya Beygelzimer | 6–2, 3–6, 3–6 |
| Win | 14. | 13 July 2003 | ITF Darmstadt, Germany | Clay | (Germany) Lydia Steinbach | 6–3, 6–1 |

=== Doubles: 19 (11–8) ===
| Result | No. | Date | Tournament | Surface | Partner | Opponents | Score |
|---|---|---|---|---|---|---|---|
| Loss | 1. | 5 August 1991 | ITF Klagenfurt, Austria | Clay | (Czechoslovakia) Katerina Vlčková | (Czechoslovakia) Ivana Havrlíková (Czechoslovakia) Pavlína Rajzlová | 7–5, 2–6, 4–6 |
| Loss | 2. | 14 June 1993 | ITF Maribor, Slovenia | Clay | (Czech Republic) Markéta Štusková | (Czech Republic) Martina Hautová (Czech Republic) Lenka Němečková | 7–6^{(4)}, 1–6, 5–7 |
| Win | 3. | 22 August 1993 | ITF Szczecin, Poland | Clay | (Czech Republic) Dominika Gorecká | (Poland) Anna Moll (Belgium) Vanessa Matthys | 6–4, 7–5 |
| Loss | 4. | 29 August 1993 | ITF Gryfino, Poland | Clay | (Poland) Monika Starosta | (Poland) Aleksandra Olsza (Ukraine) Elena Tatarkova | 6–7^{(4)}, 6–4, 5–7 |
| Loss | 5. | 13 September 1993 | ITF Zadar, Croatia | Clay | (Poland) Aleksandra Olsza | (Slovakia) Simona Nedorostová (Slovenia) Tjaša Jezernik | 6–3, 5–7, 4–6 |
| Win | 6. | 11 October 1993 | ITF Burgdorf, Switzerland | Hard (i) | (Czech Republic) Lenka Cenková | (Switzerland) Geraldine Dondit (Switzerland) Natalie Tschan | 1–6, 6–4, 6–3 |
| Win | 7. | 16 May 1994 | ITF Katowice, Poland | Clay | (Czech Republic) Lenka Cenková | (Slovakia) Nora Kovařčíková (Slovakia) Zuzana Nemšáková | w/o |
| Loss | 8. | 13 June 1994 | ITF Prostějov, Czech Republic | Clay | (Czech Republic) Lenka Cenková | (Czech Republic) Martina Hautová (Czech Republic) Monika Kratochvílová | 4–6, 2–6 |
| Win | 9. | 29 August 1994 | ITF Bad Nauheim, Germany | Clay | (Germany) Renata Kochta | (Russia) Evgenia Kulikovskaya (Ukraine) Natalia Nemchinova | 6–3, 1–6, 6–4 |
| Loss | 10. | 26 September 1994 | ITF Bratislava, Slovakia | Clay | (Czech Republic) Libuše Průšová | (Czech Republic) Milena Nekvapilová (Czech Republic) Martina Špačková | 6–7^{(6)}, 3–6 |
| Win | 11. | 14 July 1996 | ITF Puchheim, Germany | Clay | (Czech Republic) Eva Martincová | (Germany) Sabine Haas (Czech Republic) Pavlína Rajzlová | 6–2, 5–7, 6–1 |
| Win | 12. | 12 August 1996 | ITF Lohmar, Germany | Clay | (Czech Republic) Jana Pospíšilová | (Czech Republic) Michaela Paštiková (Czech Republic) Jitka Schönfeldová | 6–7^{(1)}, 6–3, 6–3 |
| Win | 13. | 24 November 1996 | ITF Nuriootpa, Australia | Hard | (Czech Republic) Eva Martincová | (Australia) Rachel McQuillan (Australia) Kirrily Sharpe | 6–3, 6–4 |
| Win | 14. | 1 September 1997 | ITF Olsztyn, Poland | Clay | (Czech Republic) Jana Ondrouchová | (Poland) Dominika Olszewska (Czech Republic) Renata Kučerová | 6–2, 6–3 |
| Win | 15. | 13 October 1997 | ITF Saint-Raphaël, France | Hard (i) | (Czech Republic) Hana Šromová | (Germany) Susi Lohrmann (Austria) Kerstin Marent | 6–3, 6–3 |
| Win | 16. | 9 November 1998 | ITF Bossonnens, Switzerland | Hard (i) | (Czech Republic) Zuzana Hejdová | (Czech Republic) Dája Bedáňová (Czech Republic) Zuzana Ondrášková | 6–4, 7–6^{(5)} |
| Loss | 17. | 5 December 1999 | ITF Port Pirie, Australia | Hard | (Czech Republic) Eva Martincová | (Australia) Kerry-Anne Guse (Australia) Lisa McShea | 4–6, 1–6 |
| Win | 18. | 8 October 2000 | ITF Makarska, Croatia | Clay | (Czech Republic) Eva Martincová | (Croatia) Maja Palaveršić (Slovenia) Maja Matevžič | 4–2, 4–1, 2–4, 4–2 |
| Loss | 19. | 9 October 2000 | ITF Plzen, Czech Republic | Clay (i) | (Czech Republic) Gabriela Chmelinová | (Czech Republic) Eva Krejčová (Czech Republic) Helena Vildová | 3–5, 1–4, 2–4 |
