= Magda Mihalache =

Romanian tennis player

- Country (sports): Romania
- Born: 6 July 1981 (age 43); Brăila, Socialist Republic of Romania
- Turned pro: 1996
- Retired: 2015
- Plays: Right-handed (two-handed backhand)
- Prize money: $148,682

Singles
- Career record: 286–238
- Career titles: 5 ITF
- Highest ranking: No. 176 (9 May 2005)

Grand Slam singles results
- Australian Open: Q2 (2006)
- French Open: Q1 (2006)
- Wimbledon: Q1 (2005)
- US Open: Q1 (1999)

Doubles
- Career record: 143–113
- Career titles: 12 ITF
- Highest ranking: No. 120 (1 November 1999)

Grand Slam doubles results
- Australian Open: 1R (2000)

Team competitions
- Fed Cup: 7–5

Magda Mihalache (born 6 July 1981) is a retired Romanian tennis player.

In May 2005, she reached her highest WTA ranking of 176 in singles whilst her best doubles ranking was 120 in November 1999. She was coached by Dietmar Rau. Mihalache won five singles and twelve doubles titles on the ITF Women's Circuit.

Playing for Romania at the Fed Cup, Mihalache has a win–loss record of 7–5.

== ITF finals ==
=== Singles (5–10) ===
| Legend $100,000 tournaments $75,000 tournaments $50,000 tournaments $25,000 tournaments $10,000 tournaments | Finals by surface Hard (2–0) Clay (3–10) Grass (0–0) Carpet (0–0) |

| Result | No. | Date | Tournament | Surface | Opponent | Score |
|---|---|---|---|---|---|---|
| Loss | 1. | 22 September 1996 | Bossonnens, Switzerland | Clay | (Germany) Camilla Kremer | 3–6, 3–6 |
| Loss | 2. | 14 September 1997 | Cluj, Romania | Clay | (Slovakia) Martina Suchá | 5–7, 6–3, 4–6 |
| Loss | 3. | 27 June 1999 | Sopot, Poland | Clay | (Poland) Anna Bieleń-Żarska | 2–6, 3–6 |
| Loss | 4. | 2 April 2000 | Amiens, France | Clay (i) | (Netherlands) Kim de Weille | 2–6, 3–6 |
| Win | 1. | 6 April 2003 | Istanbul, Turkey | Hard (i) | (Russia) Elena Vesnina | 4–6, 6–2, 6–2 |
| Win | 2. | 13 April 2003 | Antalya, Turkey | Clay | (Germany) Annette Kolb | 7–5, 6–1 |
| Loss | 5. | 30 May 2004 | Campobasso, Italy | Clay | (India) Sania Mirza | 3–6, 4–6 |
| Win | 3. | 11 July 2004 | Darmstadt, Germany | Clay | (Sweden) Åsa Svensson | 6–1, 3–6, 7–5 |
| Loss | 6. | 3 April 2005 | Rome, Italy | Clay | (Switzerland) Romina Oprandi | 4–6, 4–6 |
| Loss | 7. | 10 April 2005 | Rome, Italy | Clay | (Bulgaria) Tsvetana Pironkova | 5–7, 5–7 |
| Win | 4. | 17 April 2005 | Civitavecchia, Italy | Clay | (Estonia) Maret Ani | 1–6, 7–5, 6–4 |
| Loss | 8. | 23 July 2006 | Darmstadt, Germany | Clay | (Romania) Monica Niculescu | 0–6, 1–6 |
| Loss | 9. | 7 August 2006 | Hechingen, Germany | Clay | (Germany) Tatjana Malek | 2–6, 3–6 |
| Win | 5. | 21 October 2006 | Lagos, Nigeria | Hard | (Romania) Ágnes Szatmári | 6–1, 3–6, 6–4 |
| Loss | 10. | 10 September 2007 | Sofia, Bulgaria | Clay | (Montenegro) Danica Krstajić | 6–3, 2–6, 2–6 |

=== Doubles (12–15) ===
| Legend $100,000 tournaments $75,000 tournaments $50,000 tournaments $25,000 tournaments $10,000 tournaments | Finals by surface Hard (3–2) Clay (7–10) Grass (0–0) Carpet (2–3) |

| Result | No. | Date | Tournament | Surface | Partner | Opponents | Score |
|---|---|---|---|---|---|---|---|
| Loss | 1. | 28 July 1997 | Horb, Germany | Clay | (Romania) Alice Pirsu | (Germany) Julia Abe (Australia) Renee Reid | 3–6, 3–6 |
| Loss | 2. | 1 September 1997 | Cluj-Napoca, Romania | Clay | (Romania) Alice Pirsu | (Czech Republic) Olga Vymetálková (Czech Republic) Blanka Kumbárová | 6–7^{(3)}, 6–4, 4–6 |
| Loss | 3. | 8 September 1997 | Cluj-Napoca, Romania | Clay | (Czech Republic) Olga Vymetálková | (Czech Republic) Pavlina Bartunková (Czech Republic) Helena Fremuthová | 4–6, 4–6 |
| Loss | 4. | 15 September 1997 | Cluj-Napoca, Romania | Clay | (Germany) Adriana Barna | (Ukraine) Tatiana Kovalchuk (Ukraine) Anna Zaporozhanova | 4–6, 7–5, 3–6 |
| Loss | 5. | 15 December 1997 | Cascais, Portugal | Clay | (Germany) Angelika Bachmann | (Belgium) Kirstin Freye (Poland) Anna Bieleń-Żarska | 7–6^{(4)}, 0–6, 4–6 |
| Loss | 6. | 31 August 1998 | Sofia, Bulgaria | Clay | (Slovakia) Zuzana Váleková | (Bulgaria) Lubomira Bacheva (Netherlands) Maaike Koutstaal | 1–6, 5–7 |
| Loss | 7. | 8 February 1999 | Birmingham, England | Hard (i) | (Germany) Angelika Bachmann | (Netherlands) Kim de Weille (South Africa) Surina De Beer | 4–6, 1–6 |
| Loss | 8. | 29 March 1999 | Pontevedra, Spain | Hard | (Romania) Oana Elena Golimbioschi | (United States) Dawn Buth (United States) Rebecca Jensen | 6–7^{(7)}, 6–7^{(5)} |
| Loss | 9. | 3 May 1999 | Athens, Greece | Clay | (South Africa) Surina De Beer | (Australia) Evie Dominikovic (Australia) Bryanne Stewart | 5–7, 4–6 |
| Win | 1. | 24 May 1999 | Warsaw, Poland | Clay | (Croatia) Jelena Kostanić Tošić | (South Korea) Cho Yoon-jeong (South Korea) Park Sung-hee | 6–1, 6–3 |
| Win | 2. | 21 June 1999 | Sopot, Poland | Clay | (Slovakia) Zuzana Váleková | (Czech Republic) Lenka Cenková (Belarus) Nadejda Ostrovskaya | 6–2, 6–4 |
| Win | 3. | 26 July 1999 | Edinburgh, Scotland | Clay | (Hungary) Petra Mandula | (Australia) Trudi Musgrave (United Kingdom) Lorna Woodroffe | 3–6, 6–4, 6–3 |
| Win | 4. | 4 October 1999 | Batumi, Georgia | Carpet (i) | (Slovakia) Zuzana Váleková | (Romania) Cătălina Cristea (South Africa) Surina De Beer | 6–4, 3–6, 6–4 |
| Loss | 10. | 11 October 1999 | Welwyn, England | Carpet (i) | (Slovakia) Zuzana Váleková | (Slovenia) Maja Matevžič (Serbia) Dragana Zarić | 6–7^{(1)}, 7–5, 2–6 |
| Loss | 11. | 18 October 1999 | Southampton, England | Carpet (i) | (Slovakia) Zuzana Váleková | (United Kingdom) Julie Pullin (United Kingdom) Lorna Woodroffe | 3–6, 2–6 |
| Win | 5. | 27 March 2000 | Amiens, France | Clay (i) | (Slovakia) Zuzana Váleková | (Argentina) Mariana Díaz Oliva (Switzerland) Aliénor Tricerri | 6–2, 6–4 |
| Win | 6. | 17 April 2000 | Filothei, Greece | Clay | (Switzerland) Aliénor Tricerri | (Hungary) Kinga Berecz (Hungary) Adrienn Hegedűs | 6–2, 5–7, 7–5 |
| Loss | 12. | 21 May 2000 | Casale Monferrato, Italy | Clay | (Bulgaria) Biljana Pawlowa-Dimitrova | (France) Chloé Carlotti (Slovakia) Eva Fislová | 1–6, 4–6 |
| Win | 7. | 14 August 2000 | Istanbul, Turkey | Hard | (Hong Kong) Tong Ka-po | (Russia) Maria Goloviznina (Russia) Evgenia Kulikovskaya | 6–1, 6–2 |
| Win | 8. | 11 June 2001 | Grado, Italy | Clay | (Croatia) Jelena Kostanić Tošić | (Czech Republic) Renata Kučerová (Czech Republic) Eva Martincová | 5–7, 6–3, 7–5 |
| Win | 9. | 5 February 2002 | Redbridge, England | Hard (i) | (Russia) Ekaterina Sysoeva | (United Kingdom) Helen Crook (China) Sun Tiantian | 4–6, 6–4, 6–4 |
| Loss | 13. | 29 April 2002 | Maglie, Italy | Carpet (i) | (Romania) Edina Gallovits-Hall | (China) Yan Zi (China) Zheng Jie | 4–6, 1–6 |
| Win | 10. | 18 February 2003 | Buchen, Germany | Carpet (i) | (Germany) Syna Schmidle | (Belgium) Leslie Butkiewicz (Netherlands) Kim Kilsdonk | 6–2, 6–3 |
| Win | 11. | 24 March 2003 | Athens, Greece | Clay | (Romania) Ruxandra Marin | (Czech Republic) Zuzana Černá (Germany) Caroline Korsawe | 6–2, 6–3 |
| Loss | 14. | 7 July 2006 | Båstad, Sweden | Clay | (Romania) Mihaela Buzărnescu | (Argentina) Erica Krauth (France) Aurélie Védy | 6–2, 4–6, 4–6 |
| Win | 12. | 9 October 2006 | Lagos, Nigeria | Hard | (Germany) Laura Siegemund | (Italy) Lisa Sabino (Thailand) Montinee Tangphong | 6–3, 6–3 |
| Loss | 15. | 18 June 2007 | Fontanafredda, Italy | Clay | (Germany) Carmen Klaschka | (Bosnia and Herzegovina) Mervana Jugić-Salkić (Serbia) Teodora Mirčić | 2–6, 1–6 |
