= Blanka Kumbárová =

Czech tennis player

- Country (sports): Czech Republic
- Born: 22 June 1976 (age 49)
- Prize money: $38,593

Singles
- Career record: 83–153
- Career titles: 1 ITF
- Highest ranking: No. 374 (9 May 1994)

Doubles
- Career record: 170–130
- Career titles: 13 ITF
- Highest ranking: No. 222 (15 September 1997)

Blanka Kumbárová (born 22 June 1976) is a Czech former professional tennis player.

Kumbárová featured as a lucky loser at the 1998 Polish Open, which was her only WTA Tour main-draw appearance.

== ITF finals ==
=== Singles (1–2) ===
Outcome	No.	Date	Tournament	Surface	Opponent	Score
Runner-up	1.	14 June 1993	Maribor, Slovenia	Clay	(Czech Republic) Lenka Němečková	0–6, 2–6
Winner	1.	2 August 1993	Staré Splavy, Czech Republic	Clay	(Czech Republic) Monika Kratochvílová	6–0, 7–5
Runner-up	2.	18 April 1994	Bol, Croatia	Clay	(Croatia) Ivona Horvat	0–6, 2–6

=== Doubles (13–9) ===
Outcome	No.	Date	Tournament	Surface	Partner	Opponents	Score
Runner-up	1.	16 May 1994	Bol, Croatia	Clay	(Czech Republic) Martina Hautová	(Bulgaria) Antoaneta Pandjerova (Bulgaria) Teodora Nedeva	3–6, 5–7
Runner-up	2.	26 September 1994	Mali Lošinj, Croatia	Clay	(Poland) Aleksandra Olsza	(Russia) Olga Ivanova (Ukraine) Natalia Nemchinova	3–6, 7–6^{(5)}, 6–7^{(5)}
Runner-up	3.	15 September 1996	Zadar, Croatia	Clay	(Czech Republic) Petra Plačková	(Slovakia) Zuzana Váleková (Slovakia) Ľudmila Cervanová	3–6, 4–6
Winner	1.	7 October 1996	Nicosia, Cyprus	Clay	(Czech Republic) Petra Raclavská	(Hungary) Nóra Köves (Hungary) Andrea Noszály	7–5, 6–2
Winner	2.	21 October 1996	Jūrmala, Latvia	Carpet	(Czech Republic) Helena Fremuthová	(Ukraine) Natalia Bondarenko (Belarus) Marina Stets	0–6, 7–6^{(1)}, 6–3
Runner-up	4.	18 August 1997	Valašské Meziříčí, Czech Republic	Clay	(Czech Republic) Petra Plačková	(Czech Republic) Kateřina Kroupová-Šišková (Czech Republic) Jana Ondrouchová	7–5, 6–7^{(6)}, 6–7^{(2)}
Winner	3.	1 September 1997	Cluj-Napoca, Romania	Clay	(Czech Republic) Olga Vymetálková	(Romania) Magda Mihalache (Romania) Alice Pirsu	7–6^{(3)}, 4–6, 6–4
Runner-up	5.	12 April 1998	Dubrovnik, Croatia	Clay	(Czech Republic) Michaela Paštiková	(Czech Republic) Helena Vildová (Czech Republic) Eva Melicharová	7–5, 4–6, 4–6
Runner-up	6.	6 September 1998	Hechingen, Germany	Clay	(Czech Republic) Linda Faltynková	(Germany) Jasmin Wöhr (Germany) Silke Meier	2–6, 2–6
Runner-up	7.	27 September 1998	Šibenik, Croatia	Hard	(Czech Republic) Olga Vymetálková	(Slovenia) Katarina Srebotnik (Croatia) Marijana Kovačević	3–6, 1–6
Runner-up	8.	4 October 1998	Supetar, Croatia	Clay	(Czech Republic) Renata Kučerová	(Czech Republic) Olga Blahotová (Czech Republic) Petra Kučová	1–6, 2–6
Winner	4.	18 January 1999	Båstad, Sweden	Hard (i)	(Czech Republic) Renata Kučerová	(Finland) Hanna-Katri Aalto (Finland) Kirsi Lampinen	6–4, 6–3
Winner	5.	14 February 2000	Pécs, Hungary	Clay	(Czech Republic) Petra Raclavská	(Hungary) Kinga Berecz (Czech Republic) Zuzana Ondrášková	7–5, 6–2
Winner	6.	28 January 2001	Båstad, Sweden	Hard (i)	(Czech Republic) Helena Vildová	(Czech Republic) Lenka Cenková (Germany) Adriana Jerabek	6–1, 6–3
Winner	7.	10 July 2001	Torun, Poland	Clay	(Czech Republic) Petra Raclavská	(Czech Republic) Gabriela Chmelinová (Czech Republic) Lenka Novotná	7–6^{(5)}, 6–3
Winner	8.	6 August 2001	Kędzierzyn-Koźle, Poland	Clay	(Czech Republic) Petra Raclavská	(Ukraine) Alona Bondarenko (Ukraine) Valeria Bondarenko	6–1, 6–2
Winner	9.	19 August 2001	Valašské Meziříčí, Czech Republic	Clay	(Czech Republic) Petra Raclavská	(Germany) Isabel Collischonn (Slovakia) Lenka Tvarošková	3–6, 7–5, 6–2
Winner	10.	15 October 2001	Makarska, Croatia	Clay	(Czech Republic) Petra Raclavská	(Croatia) Ivana Abramović (Italy) Raffaella Bindi	6–4, 7–5
Winner	11.	29 April 2002	Dubrovnik, Croatia	Clay	(Czech Republic) Jana Macurová	(Australia) Melissa Dowse (Slovakia) Linda Smolenaková	1–6, 6–4, 6–4
Winner	12.	30 July 2002	Bad Saulgau, Germany	Clay	(Czech Republic) Gabriela Chmelinová	(Ukraine) Jana Macurová (Germany) Lenka Novotná	6–2, 6–0
Runner-up	9.	4 October 2003	Trenčianske Teplice, Slovakia	Clay	(Czech Republic) Tereza Szafnerová	(Czech Republic) Milena Nekvapilová (Slovakia) Zuzana Zemenová	6–1, 1–6, 5–7
Winner	13.	7 June 2004	Staré Splavy, Czech Republic	Clay	(Czech Republic) Tereza Szafnerová	(Czech Republic) Jana Děrkasová (Czech Republic) Tereza Hladíková	6–4, 6–4
