= Ivana Višić =

Croatian tennis player (born 1980)

- Full name: Ivana Višić Vervoort
- Country (sports): Croatia
- Born: 7 October 1980 (age 44)
- Plays: Right-handed
- Prize money: $20,995

Singles
- Career record: 69–87
- Highest ranking: No. 406 (29 September 2003)

Grand Slam singles results
- Australian Open Junior: 2R (1998)
- French Open Junior: 1R (1998)
- Wimbledon Junior: 2R (1997)
- US Open Junior: 1R (1997)

Doubles
- Career record: 51–67
- Career titles: 2 ITF
- Highest ranking: No. 397 (30 March 1998)

Grand Slam doubles results
- Australian Open Junior: SF (1998)
- French Open Junior: 2R (1998)
- Wimbledon Junior: 1R (1997) (1998)
- US Open Junior: SF (1997)

Ivana Višić Vervoort (born 7 October 1980) is a Croatian former professional tennis player.

A top-10 junior, Višić was a girls' doubles semi-finalist at both the Australian Open and US Open.

Višić reached a career-high singles ranking of 406 in the world while competing on the professional tour and appeared in the doubles main draw of two WTA Tour tournaments. In 1998, she and Kristina Pojatina were lucky loser entrants at the Makarska International Championships and then in 1999, she partnered with Marijana Kovačević at the Croatian Bol Ladies Open, losing in the first round on both occasions.

During her career, she won two doubles titles on the ITF Women's Circuit.

== ITF finals ==
=== Singles: 1 (0–1) ===
Outcome	No.	Date	Tournament	Surface	Opponent	Score
Runner-up	1.	27 October 2002	Seville, Spain	Clay	(Spain) Marta Fraga	5–7, 4–6

=== Doubles: 5 (2–3) ===
Outcome	No.	Date	Tournament	Surface	Partner	Opponents	Score
Winner	1.	13 September 1998	Zadar, Croatia	Clay	(France) Camille Pin	(Czech Republic) Libuše Průšová (Poland) Anna Bieleń-Żarska	7–6^{(3)}, 7–6^{(4)}
Runner-up	1.	10 September 2000	Zadar, Croatia	Clay	(Croatia) Marijana Kovačević	(Croatia) Petra Dizdar (Croatia) Mia Marovic	2–6, 3–6
Runner-up	2.	7 July 2002	Amsterdam, Netherlands	Clay	(Czech Republic) Lenka Šnajdrová	(Australia) Christina Horiatopoulos (United States) Amanda Augustus	6–7^{(4)}, 4–6
Runner-up	3.	9 February 2003	Vale do Lobo, Portugal	Hard	(Italy) Giorgia Mortello	(Italy) Giulia Meruzzi (Italy) Silvia Disderi	0–6, 2–6
Winner	2.	3 April 2004	Cavtat, Croatia	Clay	(Croatia) Nadja Pavić	(Slovakia) Lenka Tvarošková (Serbia and Montenegro) Ljiljana Nanušević	7–6^{(1)}, 7–6^{(6)}
