= Michaela Paštiková =

Czech tennis player

- Country (sports): Czech Republic
- Residence: Prague, Czech Republic
- Born: 27 March 1980 (age 46) Šumperk, Czechoslovakia
- Height: 1.76 m (5 ft 9 in)
- Turned pro: 1996
- Retired: 2014
- Plays: Right (two-handed backhand)
- Prize money: $543,500

Singles
- Career record: 351–297
- Career titles: 0 WTA, 8 ITF
- Highest ranking: No. 89 (31 January 2005)

Grand Slam singles results
- Australian Open: 2R (2005)
- French Open: 1R (2005)
- Wimbledon: 2R (2005)
- US Open: 2R (2005)

Doubles
- Career record: 288–206
- Career titles: 1 WTA, 19 ITF
- Highest ranking: No. 35 (25 July 2005)

Grand Slam doubles results
- Australian Open: SF (2005)
- French Open: 2R (2005)
- Wimbledon: 2R (2005)
- US Open: 2R (2005)

Team competitions
- Fed Cup: 0–2

Michaela Paštiková (born 27 March 1980) is a former tennis player from the Czech Republic.

On 31 January 2005, Paštiková achieved her career-high singles ranking of world No. 89. On 25 July 2005, she peaked at No. 35 of the WTA doubles rankings.

Her father introduced her to the game at age three and she was coached by Jiri Fencl. Paštiková preferred playing on clay surfaces. Father, Vladimir, is a teacher and tennis coach, mother, Zdena, is a nurse; Michaela has a younger sister named Marketa.

Paštiková retired from professional tennis 2014.

== WTA Tour finals ==
=== Doubles: 4 (1 title, 3 runner-ups) ===
Legend
Tier I
Tier II
Tier III (0–1)
Tier IV & V (1–2)

| Result | Date | Tournament | Surface | Partner | Opponents | Score |
|---|---|---|---|---|---|---|
| Loss | Jul 1998 | Prague Open, Czech Republic | Clay | (Czech Republic) Květa Peschke | (Italy) Silvia Farina Elia (Slovakia) Karina Habšudová | 6–2, 1–6, 1–6 |
| Win | Apr 1999 | Bol Open, Croatia | Clay | (Croatia) Jelena Kostanić | (United States) Meghann Shaughnessy (Romania) Andreea Vanc | 7–5, 6–7^{(1)}, 6–2 |
| Loss | Jan 2005 | Canberra International, Australia | Hard | (Czech Republic) Gabriela Chmelinová | (Italy) Tathiana Garbin (Slovenia) Tina Križan | 5–7, 6–1, 4–6 |
| Loss | Jul 2005 | Internazionali di Modena, Italy | Clay | (Czech Republic) Gabriela Chmelinová | (Ukraine) Yuliya Beygelzimer (Bosnia and Herzegovina) Mervana Jugić-Salkić | 2–6, 0–6 |

== ITF Circuit finals ==
$100,000 tournaments
$75,000 tournaments
$50,000 tournaments
$25,000 tournaments
$10,000 tournaments

=== Singles: 13 (8–5) ===
| Result | No. | Date | Tournament | Surface | Opponent | Score |
|---|---|---|---|---|---|---|
| Win | 1. | 15 September 1996 | ITF Zadar, Croatia | Clay | (Czech Republic) Magdalena Zděnovcová | 4–6, 6–3, 6–3 |
| Win | 2. | 29 June 1997 | ITF Plzeň, Czech Republic | Clay | (Czech Republic) Kateřina Šišková | 6–2, 6–7, 6–4 |
| Loss | 1. | 8 December 1997 | ITF Ostrava, Czech Republic | Carpet (i) | (Slovakia) Katarína Studeníková | 3–6, 3–6 |
| Win | 3. | 31 May 1998 | ITF Warsaw, Poland | Clay | (Spain) Rosa María Andrés Rodríguez | 7–5, 6–3 |
| Loss | 2. | 7 June 1999 | ITF Galatina, Italy | Clay | (Spain) Rosa María Andrés Rodríguez | 1–6, 1–6 |
| Loss | 3. | 25 September 2000 | ITF Verona, Italy | Clay | (Czech Republic) Alena Vašková | 3–6, 0–6 |
| Win | 4. | 2 February 2003 | ITF Rockford, United States | Hard (i) | (Slovenia) Petra Rampre | 6–3, 3–6, 6–4 |
| Win | 5. | 23 February 2003 | ITF Columbus, United States | Hard (i) | (United States) Teryn Ashley | 3–6, 7–5, 7–5 |
| Win | 6. | 16 March 2003 | ITF Kaunas, Lithuania | Carpet (i) | (Czech Republic) Magdalena Zděnovcová | 6–3, 6–3 |
| Loss | 4. | 16 June 2003 | ITF Gorizia, Italy | Clay | (Colombia) Catalina Castaño | 6–7, 4–6 |
| Loss | 5. | 25 July 2004 | ITF Innsbruck, Austria | Clay | (Belgium) Kirsten Flipkens | 2–6, 3–6 |
| Win | 7. | 21 November 2004 | ITF Prague, Czech Republic | Hard (i) | (Germany) Sandra Klösel | 6–3, 6–2 |
| Win | 8. | 30 September 2007 | Royal Cup, Montenegro | Clay | (Slovakia) Martina Suchá | 5–7, 7–5, 7–6 |

=== Doubles: 45 (19–26) ===
| Result | No. | Date | Tournament | Surface | Partner | Opponents | Score |
|---|---|---|---|---|---|---|---|
| Loss | 1. | 23 June 1996 | ITF Staré Splavy, Czech Republic | Clay | (Czech Republic) Nikola Hübnerová | (Slovakia) Ľudmila Cervanová (Slovakia) Michaela Hasanová | 7–6^{(7)}, 6–7^{(1)}, 5–7 |
| Loss | 2. | 12 August 1996 | ITF Lohmar, Germany | Clay | (Czech Republic) Jitka Schönfeldová | (Czech Republic) Jana Pospíšilová (Czech Republic) Alena Vašková | 7–6^{(1)}, 3–6, 3–6 |
| Loss | 3. | 8 December 1997 | ITF Vítkovice, Czech Republic | Carpet (i) | (Czech Republic) Libuše Průšová | (Germany) Magdalena Kučerová (Germany) Gabriela Kučerová | 3–6, 4–6 |
| Loss | 4. | 19 January 1998 | ITF Bastad, Sweden | Hard (i) | (Czech Republic) Gabriela Chmelinová | (Denmark) Charlotte Aagaard (Denmark) Maiken Pape | 6–7^{(5)}, 3–6 |
| Loss | 5. | 12 April 1998 | ITF Dubrovnik, Croatia | Clay | (Czech Republic) Blanka Kumbárová | (Czech Republic) Helena Vildová (Czech Republic) Eva Melicharová | 7–5, 4–6, 4–6 |
| Win | 6. | 3 May 1998 | ITF Sofia, Bulgaria | Clay | (Czech Republic) Olga Vymetálková | (Bulgaria) Teodora Nedeva (Bulgaria) Desislava Topalova | 7–5, 7–6^{(5)} |
| Win | 7. | 6 September 1998 | ITF Spoleto, Italy | Clay | (Croatia) Jelena Kostanić Tošić | (Japan) Hiroko Mochizuki (Japan) Ryoko Takemura | 6–3, 6–4 |
| Loss | 8. | 27 September 1999 | ITF Porto, Portugal | Clay | (Czech Republic) Alicia Ortuño | (Spain) Lourdes Domínguez Lino (Spain) María José Martínez Sánchez | 6–3, 2–6, 1–6 |
| Loss | 9. | 1 November 1999 | ITF Hull, United Kingdom | Hard (i) | (Germany) Jasmin Wöhr | (United Kingdom) Julie Pullin (United Kingdom) Lorna Woodroffe | 4–6, 3–6 |
| Loss | 10. | 27 March 2000 | ITF Quartu Sant'Elena, Italy | Clay | (Czech Republic) Helena Vildová | (Bulgaria) Svetlana Krivencheva (Bulgaria) Antoaneta Pandjerova | 5–7, 6–7^{(7)} |
| Loss | 11. | 3 April 2000 | ITF Cagliari, Italy | Clay | (Germany) Jasmin Wöhr | (Spain) Lourdes Domínguez Lino (Spain) Alicia Ortuño | 5–7, 6–3, 3–6 |
| Win | 12. | 23 April 2000 | ITF Prostějov, Czech Republic | Clay | (Germany) Jasmin Wöhr | (Czech Republic) Helena Vildová (Czech Republic) Magdalena Zděnovcová | 3–6, 6–1, 7–6^{(10)} |
| Win | 13. | 30 September 2001 | ITF Verona, Italy | Clay | (Estonia) Maret Ani | (Spain) Lourdes Domínguez Lino (Spain) Conchita Martínez Granados | 6–7^{(4)}, 6–4, 7–6^{(5)} |
| Loss | 14. | 5 February 2002 | Midland Classic, United States | Hard (i) | (Bulgaria) Maria Geznenge | (Chinese Taipei) Janet Lee (Ukraine) Elena Tatarkova | 1–6, 3–6 |
| Loss | 15. | 20 October 2002 | Open de Touraine, France | Hard (i) | (Germany) Jasmin Wöhr | (Ukraine) Valeria Bondarenko (Ukraine) Alona Bondarenko | 6–7^{(4)}, 6–4, 3–6 |
| Loss | 16. | 2 February 2003 | ITF Rockford, United States | Hard | (Italy) Valentina Sassi | (Netherlands) Debby Haak (Netherlands) Seda Noorlander | 5–7, 4–6 |
| Win | 17. | 7 April 2003 | ITF Dinan, France | Clay (i) | (Czech Republic) Gabriela Chmelinová | (Russia) Gulnara Fattakhetdinova (Russia) Galina Fokina | 1–6, 6–2, 6–3 |
| Loss | 18. | 8 December 2003 | ITF Ostrava, Czech Republic | Carpet (i) | (Czech Republic) Iveta Benešová | (Czech Republic) Libuše Průšová (Czech Republic) Barbora Strýcová | 2–6, 4–6 |
| Win | 19. | 15 December 2003 | ITF Valašské Meziříčí, Czech Republic | Hard (i) | (Czech Republic) Iveta Benešová | (Estonia) Maret Ani (Czech Republic) Libuše Průšová | w/o |
| Win | 20. | 26 July 2004 | ITF Modena, Italy | Clay | (Czech Republic) Gabriela Chmelinová | (Bulgaria) Lubomira Bacheva (Czech Republic) Eva Birnerová | 6–2, 6–3 |
| Loss | 21. | 13 September 2004 | ITF Denain, France | Clay | (Bulgaria) Lubomira Bacheva | (Ukraine) Yuliana Fedak (Germany) Anna-Lena Grönefeld | 6–1, 1–6, 2–6 |
| Win | 22. | 15 November 2004 | ITF Prague, Czech Republic | Hard (i) | (Czech Republic) Gabriela Chmelinová | (Czech Republic) Lucie Hradecká (Czech Republic) Sandra Kleinová | 6–3, 6–3 |
| Loss | 23. | 23 November 2004 | ITF Poitiers, France | Hard (i) | (Czech Republic) Gabriela Chmelinová | (France) Stéphanie Cohen-Aloro (Tunisia) Selima Sfar | 5–7, 4–6 |
| Win | 24. | 28 June 2005 | ITF Fano, Italy | Clay | (Czech Republic) Gabriela Chmelinová | (Austria) Stefanie Haidner (Italy) Valentina Sulpizio | 6–2, 6–0 |
| Loss | 25. | 31 January 2006 | ITF Rockford, United States | Hard | (United States) Abigail Spears | (Brazil) Maria Fernanda Alves (Argentina) María Emilia Salerni | 6–0, 4–6, 2–6 |
| Loss | 26. | 24 February 2006 | ITF St. Paul, United States | Hard (i) | (Czech Republic) Eva Hrdinová | (United States) Julie Ditty (Venezuela) Milagros Sequera | 6–4, 6–7^{(5)}, 2–6 |
| Win | 27. | 12 June 2006 | Zagreb Ladies Open, Croatia | Clay | (Czech Republic) Hana Šromová | (Czech Republic) Olga Vymetálková (Czech Republic) Lucie Hradecká | w/o |
| Loss | 28. | 15 August 2006 | Bronx Open, United States | Hard | (Czech Republic) Lucie Hradecká | (United States) Julie Ditty (South Africa) Natalie Grandin | 1–6, 6–7^{(2)} |
| Loss | 29. | 26 September 2006 | ITF Biella, Italy | Hard | (Czech Republic) Lucie Hradecká | (Czech Republic) Barbora Strýcová (Czech Republic) Renata Voráčová | 3–6, 2–6 |
| Loss | 30. | 23 October 2006 | Slovak Open | Hard (i) | (Czech Republic) Lucie Hradecká | (Poland) Alicja Rosolska (Poland) Klaudia Jans | 1–6, 3–6 |
| Loss | 31. | 3 April 2007 | ITF Pelham, United States | Clay | (Czech Republic) Hana Šromová | (United States) Carly Gullickson (Australia) Nicole Kriz | 2–6, 6–2, 0–6 |
| Win | 32. | 14 April 2007 | ITF Jackson, United States | Clay | (Czech Republic) Eva Hrdinová | (Japan) Junri Namigata (Japan) Yurika Sema | 7–6^{(5)}, 7–6^{(3)} |
| Loss | 33. | 11 June 2007 | ITF Zlín, Czech Republic | Hard | (Czech Republic) Hana Šromová | (Czech Republic) Lucie Hradecká (Czech Republic) Renata Voráčová | 2–6, 6–2, 4–6 |
| Win | 34. | 6 August 2007 | Ladies Open Hechingen, Germany | Clay | (Germany) Kathrin Wörle-Scheller | (Croatia) Darija Jurak (Bosnia and Herzegovina) Sandra Martinović | 6–4, 6–4 |
| Win | 35. | 21 August 2007 | ITF Maribor, Slovenia | Clay | (Croatia) Darija Jurak | (Serbia) Ana Jovanović (Germany) Laura Siegemund | 1–6, 6–4, 6–1 |
| Loss | 36. | 3 December 2007 | ITF Přerov, Czech Republic | Hard (i) | (Czech Republic) Gabriela Chmelinová | (Czech Republic) Veronika Chvojková (Czech Republic) Kateřina Vaňková | 6–3, 4–6 [10–12] |
| Win | 37. | 6 April 2008 | ITF Pelham, United States | Clay | (United States) Ahsha Rolle | (South Korea) Lee Ye-ra (Japan) Remi Tezuka | 7–5, 6–2 |
| Loss | 38. | 13 April 2008 | ITF Jackson, United States | Clay | (United States) Christina Fusano | (Argentina) Soledad Esperón (Argentina) María Irigoyen | 6–1, 3–6 [6–10] |
| Win | 39. | 20 April 2008 | ITF Palm Beach Gardens, United States | Clay | (Brazil) Maria Fernanda Alves | (Russia) Ekaterina Afinogenova (United States) Lauren Albanese | 3–6, 6–3, [10–5] |
| Win | 40. | 27 April 2008 | ITF Dothan Classic, United States | Clay | (United States) Tetiana Luzhanska | (Brazil) Maria Fernanda Alves (Canada) Stéphanie Dubois | 6–1, 6–3 |
| Win | 41. | 23 February 2009 | Clearwater Open, United States | Hard | (Czech Republic) Lucie Hradecká | (Italy) Maria Elena Camerin (Belgium) Yanina Wickmayer | w/o |
| Win | 42. | 13 June 2009 | ITF Szczecin, Poland | Clay | (Slovakia) Lenka Tvarošková | (United States) Christina McHale (United States) Asia Muhammad | 6–2, 7–5 |
| Loss | 43. | 13 July 2009 | ITF Darmstadt, Germany | Clay | (Russia) Anastasia Meglinskaya | (Germany) Korina Perkovic (Germany) Valentina Stephan | 5–7, 4–6 |
| Loss | 44. | 11 August 2009 | ITF Trnava, Slovak Republic | Clay | (Czech Republic) Darina Šeděnková | (Austria) Sandra Klemenschits (Czech Republic) Vladimíra Uhlířová | 4–6, 2–6 |
| Win | 45. | 2 November 2009 | Open Nantes Atlantique, France | Hard (i) | (Czech Republic) Lucie Hradecká | (Czech Republic) Vladimíra Uhlířová (Czech Republic) Renata Voráčová | 6–4, 6–4 |
