= Jelena Kostanić Tošić =

Croatian tennis player (born 1981)

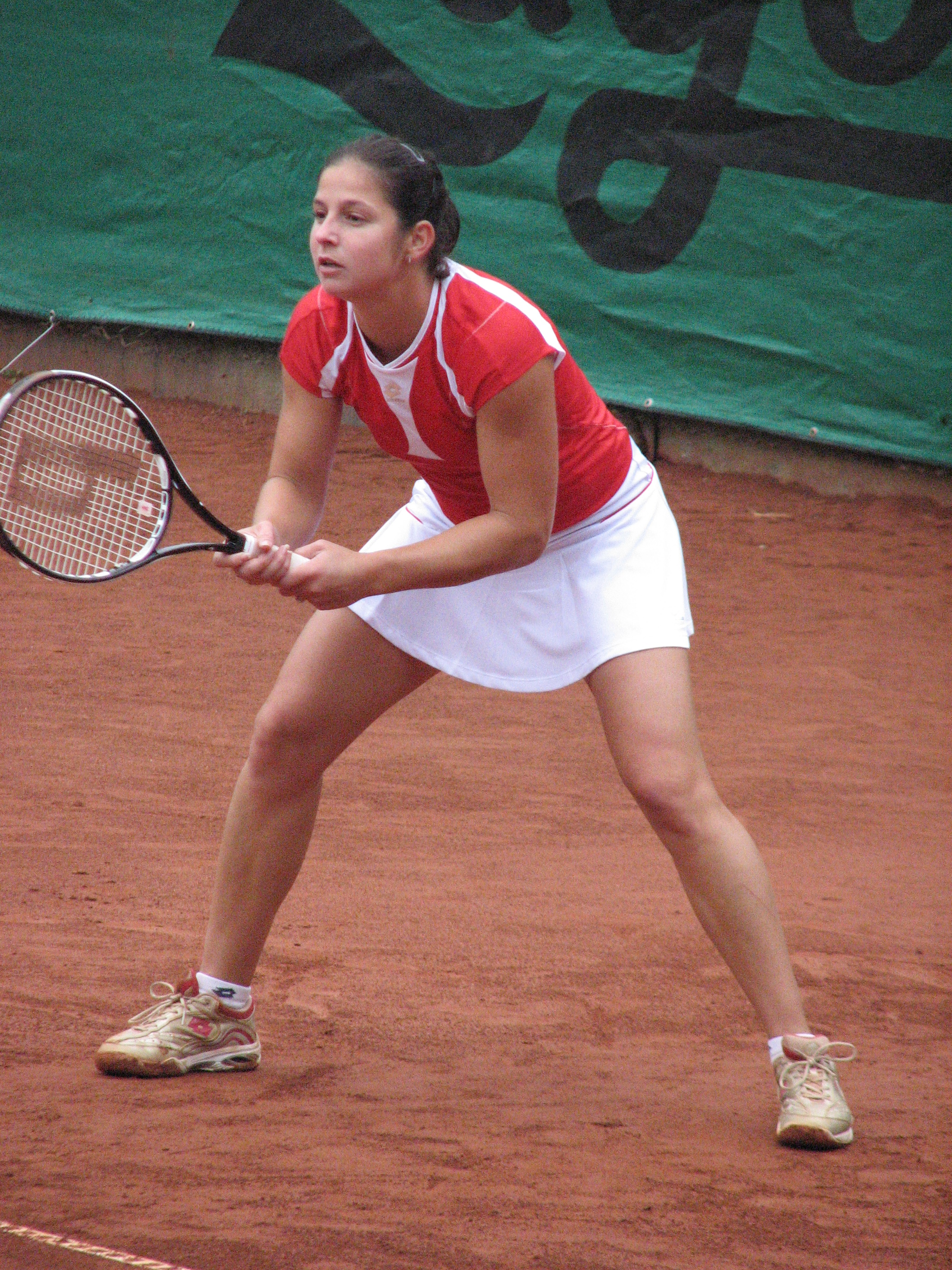
- Country (sports): Croatia
- Residence: Zagreb, Croatia
- Born: 6 July 1981 (age 45) Split, SFRY
- Height: 1.68 m (5 ft 6 in)
- Turned pro: July 1999
- Retired: September 2010
- Plays: Left (two-handed backhand)
- Prize money: $1,577,765

Singles
- Career record: 328–261
- Career titles: 0 WTA, 4 ITF
- Highest ranking: No. 32 (26 July 2004)

Grand Slam singles results
- Australian Open: 3R (2000, 2006, 2007)
- French Open: 2R (2002, 2003, 2004, 2005)
- Wimbledon: 1R (2000, 2002, 2003, 2004, 2005, 2006, 2007)
- US Open: 3R (2004)

Doubles
- Career record: 198–179
- Career titles: 8 WTA, 10 ITF
- Highest ranking: No. 30 (4 October 2004)

Grand Slam doubles results
- Australian Open: 2R (2003, 2004, 2007, 2008)
- French Open: 2R (2003, 2004)
- Wimbledon: 2R (2002, 2004)
- US Open: QF (2008)

Team competitions
- Fed Cup: 19–20

Jelena Kostanić Tošić (née Kostanić; born 6 July 1981) is a former professional tennis player from Croatia.

On 26 July 2004, she reached a career-high singles ranking of world No. 32. On 4 October 2004, she reached her highest doubles ranking of No. 30. Kostanić Tošić won eight doubles titles on the WTA Tour and four singles and ten doubles titles on the ITF Women's Circuit. As a junior, she won the 1998 Australian Open.

She married Croatian table tennis player Roko Tošić on 8 July 2006 (until 6 January 2007 she competed as Jelena Kostanić).

At the 2008 Australian Open, Tošić was defeated in the first round by the eventual champion, Maria Sharapova, in straight sets.

Playing for Croatia Fed Cup team, Kostanić Tošić has a win–loss record of 19–20.

Her last tournament on the professional tour was the 2010 US Open.

== Personal ==
Jelena started playing tennis at age seven. She was eventually coached by Alan Maric; off-court trainer was Slaven Hrvoj. Father Slobodan is an external bank auditor; mother Smiljana is a dental nurse; sister Marina is a student of economics. Entire family plays recreational tennis on private court.

== WTA Tour finals ==
=== Singles: 3 (3 runner-ups) ===
Legend
Tier I
Tier II
Tier III (0–1)
Tier IV & V (0–2)

Result	No.	Date	Tournament	Surface	Opponent	Score
Loss	1.	Aug 2003	Nordic Light Open, Finland	Clay	(Israel) Anna Smashnova	6–4, 4–6, 0–6
Loss	2.	Feb 2006	Pattaya Open, Thailand	Hard	(Israel) Shahar Pe'er	3–6, 1–6
Loss	3.	Feb 2006	Bangalore Open, India	Hard	(Italy) Mara Santangelo	6–3, 6–7^{(5)}, 3–6

=== Doubles: 16 (8 titles, 8 runner-ups) ===
Legend
Tier I (0–0)
Tier II (0–0)
Tier III (5–4)
Tier IV & V (3–4)

Result	No.	Date	Tournament	Surface	Partner	Opponents	Score
Win	1.	Apr 1999	Bol Ladies Open, Croatia	Clay	(Czech Republic) Michaela Paštiková	(United States) Meghann Shaughnessy (Romania) Andreea Vanc	7–5, 6–7^{(1)}, 6–2
Win	2.	Nov 1999	Kuala Lumpur International, Malaysia	Hard	(Slovenia) Tina Pisnik	(Japan) Rika Hiraki (Japan) Yuka Yoshida	3–6, 6–2, 6–4
Loss	1.	Apr 2000	Budapest Grand Prix, Hungary	Clay	(Federal Republic of Yugoslavia) Sandra Načuk	(Bulgaria) Lubomira Bacheva (Spain) Cristina Torrens Valero	0–6, 2–6
Win	3.	May 2002	J&S Cup Warsaw, Poland	Clay	(Slovakia) Henrieta Nagyová	(Russia) Evgenia Kulikovskaya (Croatia) Silvija Talaja	6–1, 6–1
Win	4.	May 2002	Internationaux de Strasbourg, France	Clay	(United States) Jennifer Hopkins	(France) Caroline Dhenin (Slovenia) Maja Matevžič	0–6, 6–4, 6–4
Loss	2.	May 2003	Internationaux de Strasbourg, France	Clay	(United States) Laura Granville	(Canada) Sonya Jeyaseelan (Croatia) Maja Matevžič	4–6, 4–6
Win	5.	Jan 2004	Auckland Open, New Zealand	Hard	(Bosnia and Herzegovina) Mervana Jugić-Salkić	(Spain) Virginia Ruano Pascual (Argentina) Paola Suárez	7–6^{(6)}, 3–6, 6–1
Win	6.	Jan 2004	Canberra International, Australia	Hard	(Luxembourg) Claudine Schaul	(France) Caroline Dhenin (Australia) Lisa McShea	6–4, 7–6^{(3)}
Loss	3.	Jun 2004	Rosmalen Championships, Netherlands	Grass	(Luxembourg) Claudine Schaul	(Australia) Lisa McShea (Venezuela) Milagros Sequera	6–7^{(3)}, 3–6
Loss	4.	May 2005	Prague Open, Czech Republic	Clay	(Czech Republic) Barbora Záhlavová-Strýcová	(Australia) Nicole Pratt (France) Émilie Loit	7–6^{(6)}, 4–6, 4–6
Loss	5.	Sep 2005	Slovenia Open	Hard	(Slovenia) Katarina Srebotnik	(Spain) Anabel Medina Garrigues (Italy) Roberta Vinci	4–6, 7–5, 2–6
Loss	6.	Jan 2006	Hobart International, Australia	Hard	(United States) Jill Craybas	(France) Émilie Loit (Australia) Nicole Pratt	2–6, 1–6
Loss	7.	Oct 2006	Guangzhou International, China	Hard	(United States) Vania King	(China) Li Ting (China) Sun Tiantian	4–6, 6–2, 5–7
Win	7.	Oct 2006	Japan Open	Hard	(United States) Vania King	(Chinese Taipei) Chan Yung-jan (Chinese Taipei) Chuang Chia-jung	7–6^{(2)}, 5–7, 6–2
Win	8.	Oct 2006	Bangkok Open, Thailand	Hard	(United States) Vania King	(Argentina) Mariana Díaz Oliva (South Africa) Natalie Grandin	7–5, 2–6, 7–5
Loss	8.	Feb 2008	Copa Colsanitas, Colombia	Clay	(Germany) Martina Müller	(Czech Republic) Iveta Benešová (United States) Bethanie Mattek-Sands	3–6, 3–6

== ITF finals ==
Legend
$100,000 tournaments
$75,000 tournaments
$50,000 tournaments
$25,000 tournaments
$10,000 tournaments

=== Singles: 10 (4–6) ===
Result	No.	Date	Tournament	Surface	Opponent	Score
Loss	1.	29 September 1997	ITF Zadar, Croatia	Clay	(Slovenia) Katarina Srebotnik	6–4, 4–6, 4–6
Loss	2.	5 April 1998	ITF Hvar, Croatia	Clay	(Russia) Nadia Petrova	2–6, 2–6
Win	1.	20 September 1998	ITF Otočec, Slovenia	Clay	(Germany) Anca Barna	6–4, 7–6
Win	2.	28 February 1999	ITF Bushey, United Kingdom	Carpet (i)	(United Kingdom) Lorna Woodroffe	7–6, 6–3
Win	3.	24 May 1999	ITF Warsaw, Poland	Clay	(Czech Republic) Libuše Průšová	4–6, 6–3, 6–2
Win	4.	1 July 2001	ITF Fontanafredda, Italy	Clay	(Morocco) Bahia Mouhtassine	6–4, 6–3
Loss	3.	16 October 2005	Open de Touraine, France	Hard (i)	(France) Émilie Loit	2–6, 1–6
Loss	4.	20 April 2008	Open de Saint-Malo, France	Clay	(France) Stéphanie Cohen-Aloro	2–6, 5–7
Loss	5.	15 June 2008	ITF Zlín, Czech Republic	Clay	(Germany) Anna-Lena Grönefeld	3–6, 6–4, 1–6
Loss	6.	20 July 2008	ITF Biella, Italy	Clay	(Italy) Mara Santangelo	3–6, 1–6

=== Doubles: 12 (10–2) ===
Result	No.	Date	Tournament	Surface	Partner	Opponents	Score
Win	1.	21 April 1997	ITF Biograd, Croatia	Clay	(Slovenia) Katarina Srebotnik	(Italy) Katia Altilia (Denmark) Charlotte Aagaard	6–4, 6–2
Win	2.	29 April 1997	ITF Zadar, Croatia	Clay	(Slovenia) Katarina Srebotnik	(Netherlands) Yvette Basting (Netherlands) Susanne Trik	7–5, 7–5
Win	3.	23 March 1998	ITF Makarska, Croatia	Clay	(Slovenia) Katarina Srebotnik	(Slovakia) Ľudmila Cervanová (Slovakia) Zuzana Váleková	6–3, 6–1
Win	4.	5 April 1998	ITF Hvar, Croatia	Clay	(Slovenia) Katarina Srebotnik	(Czech Republic) Helena Vildová (Bulgaria) Antoaneta Pandjerova	7–5, 6–3
Win	5.	6 September 1998	ITF Spoleto, Italy	Clay	(Czech Republic) Michaela Paštiková	(Japan) Hiroko Mochizuki (Japan) Ryoko Takemura	6–3, 6–4
Win	6.	24 May 1999	ITF Warsaw, Poland	Clay	(Romania) Magda Mihalache	(South Korea) Cho Yoon-jeong (South Korea) Park Sung-hee	6–1, 6–3
Win	7.	11 June 2001	ITF Grado, Italy	Clay	(Romania) Magda Mihalache	(Czech Republic) Renata Kučerová (Czech Republic) Eva Martincová	5–7, 6–3, 7–5
Loss	1.	24 November 2002	ITF Zagreb, Croatia	Hard (i)	(Croatia) Matea Mezak	(Bosnia and Herzegovina) Mervana Jugić-Salkić (Croatia) Karolina Šprem	2–6, 4–6
Win	8.	16 October 2005	Open de Touraine, France	Hard	(Croatia) Matea Mezak	(Hungary) Zsófia Gubacsi (Belarus) Darya Kustova	6–4, 6–4
Win	9.	11 December 2006	Dubai Tennis Challenge, United Arab Emirates	Hard	(Bosnia and Herzegovina) Mervana Jugić-Salkić	(Ukraine) Kateryna Bondarenko (Ukraine) Valeria Bondarenko	6–3, 6–0
Loss	2.	11 May 2008	Zagreb Ladies Open, Croatia	Clay	(France) Stéphanie Foretz	(Hungary) Melinda Czink (United States) Sunitha Rao	4–6, 2–6
Win	10.	13 July 2008	Zagreb Ladies Open, Croatia	Clay	(Estonia) Maret Ani	(Ukraine) Yuliya Beygelzimer (Switzerland) Stefanie Vögele	6–4, 6–2

== Grand Slam performance timelines ==
Key
W	F	SF	QF	#R	RR	Q#	DNQ	A	NH

(W) winner; (F) finalist; (SF) semifinalist; (QF) quarterfinalist; (#R) rounds 4, 3, 2, 1; (RR) round-robin stage; (Q#) qualification round; (DNQ) did not qualify; (A) absent; (NH) not held; (SR) strike rate (events won / competed); (W–L) win–loss record.

=== Singles ===
Tournament	1999	2000	2001	2002	2003	2004	2005	2006	2007	2008
Australian Open	A	3R	1R	2R	1R	1R	2R	3R	3R	1R
French Open	A	1R	A	2R	2R	2R	2R	1R	1R	A
Wimbledon	A	1R	A	1R	1R	1R	1R	1R	1R	A
US Open	2R	2R	A	1R	1R	3R	1R	2R	2R	1R

=== Doubles ===
Tournament	1999	2000	2001	2002	2003	2004	2005	2006	2007	2008	2009
Australian Open	A	1R	1R	A	2R	2R	1R	1R	2R	2R	1R
French Open	A	1R	A	A	2R	2R	1R	1R	1R	A	A
Wimbledon	A	1R	A	2R	1R	2R	1R	1R	1R	A	A
US Open	1R	2R	A	1R	1R	2R	1R	2R	1R	QF	A
