= Zuzana Hejdová =

Czech tennis player

- Country (sports): Czech Republic
- Born: 29 April 1977 (age 47); Czechoslovakia
- Turned pro: 1995
- Retired: 2005
- Prize money: $92,999

Singles
- Career record: 231–252
- Career titles: 2 ITF
- Highest ranking: No. 222 (4 August 2003)

Grand Slam singles results
- US Open: Q1 (2003)

Doubles
- Career record: 178–181
- Career titles: 10 ITF
- Highest ranking: No. 140 (29 September 2003)

Zuzana Hejdová (born 29 April 1977) is a former Czech tennis player.

Hejdová won two singles and ten doubles titles on the ITF Circuit in her career. On 4 August 2003, she reached her best singles ranking of world No. 222. On 29 September 2003, she peaked at No. 140 in the doubles rankings.

== ITF Circuit finals ==
=== Singles (2–2) ===
Legend $25,000 tournaments $10,000 tournaments	Finals by surface Hard (0–1) Clay (2–1)

Result	Date	Tournament	Surface	Opponent	Score
Loss	Jun 1997	ITF Kędzierzyn-Koźle, Poland	Clay	(Czech Republic) Milena Nekvapilová	3–6, 6–2, 3–6
Win	Jun 2000	ITF Vaduz, Liechtenstein	Clay	(New Zealand) Shelley Stephens	6–7^{(4–7)}, 6–2, 6–2
Win	Jul 2000	ITF Amersfoort, Netherlands	Clay	(Netherlands) Anousjka van Exel	w/o
Loss	Apr 2002	ITF Coatzacoalcos, Mexico	Hard	(Russia) Anastasia Rodionova	3–6, 6–4, 4–6

=== Doubles (10–15) ===
Legend $50,000 tournaments $25,000 tournaments $10,000 tournaments	Finals by surface Hard (1–1) Clay (9–12) Carpet (0–2)

Outcome	No.	Date	Location	Surface	Partner	Opponents	Score
Runner-up	1.	8 May 1995	Nitra, Slovakia	Clay	(Czech Republic) Romana Černošková	(Slovakia) Zuzana Nemšáková (Slovakia) Tatiana Zelenayová	3–6, 3–6
Winner	1.	7 July 1997	Fiumicino, Italy	Clay	(Czech Republic) Jana Macurová	(Sweden) Sofia Finér (Russia) Anna Linkova	6–1, 6–1
Winner	2.	20 July 1998	Camaiore, Italy	Clay	(Croatia) Marijana Kovačević	(Colombia) Giana Gutiérrez (Brazil) Eugenia Maia	6–2, 6–0
Winner	3.	9 November 1998	Bossonnens, Switzerland	Hard (i)	(Czech Republic) Alena Vašková	(Czech Republic) Dája Bedáňová (Czech Republic) Zuzana Ondrášková	6–4, 7–6^{(7–5)}
Runner-up	2.	10 April 2000	Hvar, Croatia	Clay	(Czech Republic) Petra Kučová	(Croatia) Marijana Kovačević (Italy) Mara Santangelo	3–6, 6–4, 3–6
Runner-up	3.	5 June 2000	Vaduz, Liechtenstein	Clay	(Czech Republic) Jana Macurová	(New Zealand) Rewa Hudson (New Zealand) Shelley Stephens	2–6, 6–2, 2–6
Runner-up	4.	24 July 2000	Horb, Germany	Clay	(Australia) Kristen van Elden	(Poland) Patrycja Bandurowska (Argentina) María Emilia Salerni	3–6, 4–6
Runner-up	5.	28 August 2000	Bad Saulgau, Germany	Clay	(Czech Republic) Petra Novotniková	(New Zealand) Liz Finlayson (New Zealand) Rewa Hudson	0–6, 4–6
Winner	4.	25 September 2000	Makarska 3, Croatia	Clay	(Netherlands) Natasha Galouza	(Romania) Ramona But (Romania) Edina Gallovits	7–5, 6–3
Runner-up	6.	26 March 2001	Bari, Italy	Clay	(Slovakia) Eva Fislová	(Germany) Julia Schruff (Germany) Rita Tarjan	6–3, 5–7, 4–6
Runner-up	7.	2 April 2001	Makarska 1, Croatia	Clay	(Bosnia and Herzegovina) Mervana Jugić-Salkić	(Czech Republic) Gabriela Navrátilová (Czech Republic) Petra Kučová	6–1, 2–6, 3–6
Runner-up	8.	5 November 2001	Cairo 2, Egypt	Clay	(Slovakia) Gabriela Voleková	(Czech Republic) Milena Nekvapilová (Czech Republic) Hana Šromová	3–6, 2–6
Runner-up	9.	3 December 2001	Průhonice, Czech Republic	Carpet (i)	(Czech Republic) Renata Kučerová	(Czech Republic) Olga Blahotová (Czech Republic) Gabriela Navrátilová	2–6, 3–6
Runner-up	10.	11 February 2002	Bergamo, Italy	Hard (i)	(Czech Republic) Renata Kučerová	(Italy) Silvia Disderi (Austria) Stefanie Haidner	5–7, 3–6
Runner-up	11.	11 March 2002	Makarska 2, Croatia	Clay	(Italy) Silvia Disderi	(Slovenia) Tina Hergold (Israel) Yevgenia Savransky	3–6, 5–7
Winner	5.	18 November 2002	Deauville, France	Clay (i)	(Czech Republic) Zuzana Černá	(Bulgaria) Maria Geznenge (Bulgaria) Antoaneta Pandjerova	6–4, 7–5
Winner	6.	9 June 2003	Vaduz, Liechtenstein	Clay	(Hungary) Zsófia Gubacsi	(Czech Republic) Petra Cetkovská (Czech Republic) Jana Hlaváčková	6–4, 6–4
Winner	7.	7 July 2003	Toruń, Poland	Clay	(Ukraine) Olena Antypina	(Australia) Mireille Dittmann (Sweden) Helena Ejeson	6–3, 6–3
Runner-up	12.	20 October 2003	Opole, Poland	Carpet (i)	(Czech Republic) Hana Šromová	(Czech Republic) Olga Blahotová (Czech Republic) Gabriela Navrátilová	4–6, 3–6
Runner-up	13.	17 November 2003	Deauville, France	Clay (i)	(Bulgaria) Maria Geznenge	(France) Pauline Parmentier (France) Aurélie Védy	7–5, 2–6, 1–6
Runner-up	14.	15 March 2004	Rome 2, Italy	Clay	(Slovakia) Lenka Tvarošková	(Italy) Alice Canepa (Italy) Emily Stellato	6–4, 1–6, 5–7
Winner	8.	21 June 2004	Båstad, Sweden	Clay	(Germany) Vanessa Henke	(Australia) Mireille Dittmann (Sweden) Hanna Nooni	2–6, 6–2, 6–3
Winner	9.	20 June 2005	Davos, Switzerland	Clay	(Germany) Andrea Petkovic	(Czech Republic) Petra Cetkovská (Bosnia and Herzegovina) Sandra Martinović	6–3, 6–2
Runner-up	15.	5 July 2005	Toruń, Poland	Clay	(Poland) Joanna Sakowicz	(Belarus) Nadejda Ostrovskaya (Israel) Yevgenia Savransky	1–6, 5–7
Winner	10.	12 July 2005	Garching, Germany	Clay	(Austria) Eva-Maria Hoch	(Slovakia) Lenka Dlhopolcová (Germany) Laura Siegemund	4–6, 6–4, 6–3
