= Gabriela Chmelinová =

Czech tennis player

Gabriela Navratilova-Chmelinová
- Country (sports): Czech Republic
- Born: 2 June 1976 (age 50) Czechoslovakia
- Height: 1.75 m (5 ft 9 in)
- Turned pro: 1992
- Retired: 2008, 2016
- Plays: Right (two-handed backhand)
- Prize money: $345,020

Singles
- Career record: 283–242
- Career titles: 6 ITF
- Highest ranking: No. 258 (23 June 2003)

Doubles
- Career record: 474–238
- Career titles: 55 ITF
- Highest ranking: No. 32 (25 July 2005)

Grand Slam doubles results
- Australian Open: SF (2005)
- French Open: 2R (2005, 2007)
- Wimbledon: 2R (2005)
- US Open: 1R (2003, 2004, 2006, 2007, 2008)

Grand Slam mixed doubles results
- Wimbledon: 1R (2005)

Gabriela Chmelinová (née Navrátilová; born 2 June 1976) is a Czech former tennis player.

In her career, Chmelinová won six singles titles and 55 doubles titles on the ITF Circuit. On 23 June 2003, she reached her best singles ranking of world No. 258. On 25 July 2005, she peaked at No. 55 in the doubles rankings.

Until 2003, Navrátilová played mainly on the ITF Women's Circuit in Europe, garnering over 60 titles. From 2004, she began to play exclusively in doubles and became a more active participant on the WTA Tour. She reached six finals and the semifinals of the 2005 Australian Open, partnering with Michaela Paštiková. She announced her retirement in November 2008.

In November 2014, in a comeback in an ITF tournament in Poland, she reached the final, partnered with Karolína Muchová. In 2016, Chmelinová retired again and finally from professional tour.

She is related to Martina Navratilova by her paternal grandfather.

== WTA Tour finals ==
=== Doubles: 6 (6 runner-ups) ===
Legend Tier I / Premier M & Premier 5 Tier II / Premier (0–1) Tier III, IV & V / International (0–5)	Finals by surface Hard (0–1) Clay (0–4) Carpet (0–1)

Result	Date	Tournament	Surface	Partner	Opponents	Score
Loss	Mar 2004	Mexican Open	Clay	(Czech Republic) Olga Blahotová	(Australia) Lisa McShea (Venezuela) Milagros Sequera	6–2, 6–7^{(5–7)}, 4–6
Loss	Mar 2004	Portugal Open	Clay	(Czech Republic) Olga Blahotová	(Switzerland) Emmanuelle Gagliardi (Slovakia) Janette Husárová	3–6, 2–6
Loss	Jan 2005	Canberra International, Australia	Hard	(Czech Republic) Michaela Paštiková	(Italy) Tathiana Garbin (Slovenia) Tina Križan	5–7, 6–1, 4–6
Loss	Jul 2005	Internazionali di Modena, Italy	Clay	(Czech Republic) Michaela Paštiková	(Ukraine) Yuliya Beygelzimer (Bosnia and Herzegovina) Mervana Jugić-Salkić	2–6, 0–6
Loss	Feb 2007	Open Gaz de France, Paris	Carpet (i)	(Czech Republic) Vladimíra Uhlířová	(Zimbabwe) Cara Black (South Africa) Liezel Huber	2–6, 0–6
Loss	Apr 2007	Budapest Grand Prix, Hungary	Clay	(Germany) Martina Müller	(Hungary) Ágnes Szávay (Czech Republic) Vladimíra Uhlířová	5–7, 2–6

== ITF finals ==
Legend
$100,000 tournaments
$75,000 tournaments
$50,000 tournaments
$25,000 tournaments
$10,000 tournaments

=== Singles: 12 (6–6) ===
Result	No.	Date	Öocation	Surface	Opponent	Score
Win	1.	24 June 1996	Bastad, Sweden	Clay	(Sweden) Sofia Finér	6–3, 6–3
Win	2.	13 January 1997	Helsinki, Finland	Hard (i)	(Netherlands) Stephanie Rottier	3–6, 6–4, 2–2 ret.
Loss	3.	12 January 1998	Reykjavík, Iceland	Carpet (i)	(France) Karolina Jagieniak	6–7^{(1)}, 0–6
Win	4.	22 June 1998	Bastad, Sweden	Clay	(Sweden) Maria Persson	6–2, 7–6^{(4)}
Win	5.	19 July 1999	Brussels, Belgium	Clay	(Hungary) Eszter Molnár	7–5, 6–0
Win	6.	31 January 2000	Mallorca, Spain	Clay	(Spain) Paula García	6–1, 2–6, 6–3
Loss	7.	31 July 2000	Toruń, Poland	Clay	(Czech Republic) Zuzana Ondrášková	0–6, 4–6
Loss	8.	18 September 2000	Makarska, Croatia	Clay	(Bosnia and Herzegovina) Mervana Jugić-Salkić	4–6, 2–6
Win	9.	14 October 2001	Makarska, Croatia	Clay	(Czech Republic) Dominika Luzarová	5–7, 6–3, 7–5
Loss	10.	9 September 2002	Prešov, Slovakia	Clay	(Slovakia) Dominika Nociarová	3–6, 5–7
Loss	11.	15 September 2002	Tbilisi, Georgia	Clay	(Serbia and Montenegro) Katarina Mišić	6–3, 3–6, 1–6
Loss	12.	11 November 2002	Puebla, Mexico	Hard	(Czech Republic) Olga Blahotová	1–6, 6–4, 6–7^{(3)}

=== Doubles: 87 (55–32) ===
Result	No.	Date	Tournament	Surface	Partner	Opponents	Score
Loss	1.	16 August 1993	Bergisch Gladbach, Germany	Clay	(Slovakia) Simona Nedorostova	(Czech Republic) Monika Kratochvílová (Slovakia) Patrícia Marková	3–6, 2–6
Win	2.	28 August 1995	ITF Massa, Italy	Clay	(Czech Republic) Sabine Radevicová	(United States) Ingrid Kurta (Netherlands) Martine Vosseberg	6–2, 6–4
Win	3.	18 September 1995	ITF Cluj-Napoca, Romania	Clay	(Czech Republic) Sabine Radevicová	(Czech Republic) Olga Blahotová (Czech Republic) Alena Havrlíková	6–3, 3–6, 6–2
Loss	4.	25 March 1996	Makarska, Croatia	Clay	(Slovakia) Simona Nedorostová	(Slovakia) Michaela Hasanová (Slovakia) Martina Nedelková	3–6, 3–6
Win	5.	19 August 1996	Valašské Meziříčí, Czech Republic	Clay	(Czech Republic) Sabine Radevicová	(Slovakia) Zuzana Váleková (Slovakia) Ľudmila Cervanová	4–6, 6–4, 6–4
Loss	6.	2 December 1996	Ostrava, Czech Republic	Carpet (i)	(Slovakia) Sabine Radevicová	(Switzerland) Angela Bürgis (Czech Republic) Nikola Hubnerová	6–1, 6–7^{(3)}, 1–6
Win	7.	13 January 1997	Helsinki, Finland	Hard (i)	(Czech Republic) Olga Blahotová	(Netherlands) Maaike Koutstaal (Russia) Anna Linkova	6–2, 6–1
Win	8.	16 June 1997	Doksy, Czech Republic	Clay	(Czech Republic) Jana Matsurová	(Czech Republic) Kateřina Kroupová-Šišková (Czech Republic) Jana Ondrouchová	6–2, 6–2
Loss	9.	12 January 1998	Reykjavík, Iceland	Carpet (i)	(Czech Republic) Olga Blahotová	(Netherlands) Kim Kilsdonk (Netherlands) Jolanda Mens	4–6, 7–5, 5–7
Loss	10.	19 January 1998	Bastad, Sweden	Hard (i)	(Czech Republic) Michaela Paštiková	(Denmark) Charlotte Aagaard (Denmark) Maiken Pape	6–7^{(5)}, 3–6
Win	11.	2 February 1998	Istanbul, Turkey	Carpet (i)	(Hungary) Adrienn Hegedűs	(Czech Republic) Olga Blahotová (Czech Republic) Hana Šromová	6–4, 4–6, 6–2
Loss	12.	30 March 1998	Athens, Greece	Clay	(Czech Republic) Jana Macurová	(Czech Republic) Milena Nekvapilová (Czech Republic) Hana Šromová	3–6, 5–7
Loss	13.	22 June 1998	Bastad, Sweden	Clay	(Czech Republic) Helena Fremuthová	(Sweden) Jenny Lindstrom (Sweden) Anna-Karin Svensson	6–7^{(1)}, 3–6
Loss	14.	27 July 1998	Bella Cup, Poland	Clay	(Czech Republic) Petra Plačková	(Czech Republic) Olga Blahotová (Czech Republic) Jana Macurová	6–7^{(2)}, 0–6
Loss	15.	24 August 1998	Plzeň, Czech Republic	Clay	(Czech Republic) Veronika Raimrová	(Czech Republic) Olga Blahotová (Czech Republic) Jana Macurová	6–1, 2–6, 1–6
Loss	16.	11 January 1999	Miami, United States	Hard	(Czech Republic) Olga Blahotová	(Slovenia) Katarina Srebotnik (Slovakia) Zuzana Váleková	6–4, 4–6, 5–7
Win	17.	22 February 1999	Faro, Portugal	Hard	(Czech Republic) Olga Blahotová	(Spain) Marina Escobar (Netherlands) Debby Haak	6–2, 3–6, 6–4
Win	18.	1 March 1999	Albufeira, Portugal	Hard	(Czech Republic) Olga Blahotová	(Georgia (country)) Nino Louarsabishvili (Sweden) Kristina Triska	6–3, 6–2
Win	19.	5 April 1999	Makarska, Croatia	Clay	(Czech Republic) Olga Blahotová	(Germany) Gréta Arn (Hungary) Petra Mandula	0–6, 6–3, 7–6^{(3)}
Loss	20.	12 April 1999	Hvar, Croatia	Clay	(Czech Republic) Petra Kučová	(Germany) Esther Brunn (Germany) Jasmin Halbauer	2–6, 3–6
Win	21.	7 June 1999	Doksy, Czech Republic	Clay	(Czech Republic) Milena Nekvapilová	(Australia) Rochelle Rosenfield (Poland) Anna Bieleń-Żarska	2–6, 6–3, 6–4
Win	22.	19 July 1999	Brussels, Belgium	Clay	(Czech Republic) Olga Blahotová	(Slovakia) Andrea Šebová (Slovakia) Silvia Uríčková	6–3, 6–0
Win	23.	2 August 1999	Bella Cup, Poland	Clay	(Czech Republic) Petra Kučová	(Poland) Patrycja Bandurowska (Argentina) Vanesa Krauth	6–4, 6–3
Win	24.	16 August 1999	Valašské Meziříčí, Czech Republic	Clay	(Czech Republic) Petra Kučová	(Czech Republic) Libuše Průšová (Poland) Anna Bieleń-Żarska	7–5, 2–6, 6–3
Win	25.	27 August 1999	Fiumicino, Italy	Clay	(Czech Republic) Olga Blahotová	(Austria) Stefanie Haidner (Hungary) Katalin Miskolczi	6–3, 6–3
Win	26.	11 October 1999	Plzeň, Czech Republic	Clay	(Czech Republic) Olga Blahotová	(Slovakia) Alena Paulenková (Czech Republic) Magdalena Zděnovcová	6–1, 6–2
Loss	27.	25 October 1999	Minsk, Belarus	Carpet (i)	(Czech Republic) Jana Macurová	(Belarus) Tatiana Poutchek (Belarus) Marina Stets	4–6, 2–6
Win	28.	8 November 1999	Stupava, Slovakia	Hard (i)	(Czech Republic) Hana Šromová	(Slovakia) Alena Paulenková (Slovakia) Radka Zrubáková	6–1, 6–0
Win	29.	15 November 1999	Schlieren, Switzerland	Carpet (i)	(Czech Republic) Olga Blahotová	(Czech Republic) Hana Šromová (Czech Republic) Helena Vildová	6–2, 4–6, 7–5
Win	30.	22 November 1999	Mallorca, Spain	Clay	(Czech Republic) Petra Kučová	(Spain) Patricia Aznar (Spain) Yolanda Clemot	6–0, 6–3
Win	31.	29 November 1999	Mallorca, Spain	Clay	(Czech Republic) Petra Kučová	(Spain) Beatriz Cabrera Rosendo (Sweden) Helena Ejeson	6–0, 7–5
Loss	32.	10 January 2000	Boca Raton, United States	Hard	(Czech Republic) Olga Blahotová	(Japan) Maiko Inoue (China) Li Ting	6–4, 2–6, 3–6
Win	33.	7 February 2000	Mallorca, Spain	Clay	(Czech Republic) Jana Macurová	(Slovakia) Alena Paulenková (Slovakia) Andrea Šebová	6–2, 6–1
Win	34.	13 March 2000	Lisbon, Portugal	Clay	(Czech Republic) Olga Blahotová	(Russia) Ekaterina Kozhokina (Russia) Marina Samoilenko	6–1, 6–0
Loss	35.	3 April 2000	Makarska, Croatia	Clay	(Czech Republic) Petra Kučová	(Germany) Inga Albers (Netherlands) Natasha Galouza	1–6, 2–6
Loss	36.	31 July 2000	Bella Cup, Poland	Clay	(Czech Republic) Jana Macurová	(Czech Republic) Iveta Benešová (Czech Republic) Lenka Novotná	1–6, 4–6
Loss	37.	9 October 2000	Plzeň, Czech Republic	Clay (i)	(Czech Republic) Alena Vašková	(Czech Republic) Eva Krejčová (Czech Republic) Helena Vildová	3–5, 1–4, 2–4
Loss	38.	13 November 2000	Stupava, Slovakia	Hard (i)	(Czech Republic) Olga Blahotová	(Germany) Susi Bensch (Germany) Stefanie Weis	1–4, 4–5^{(2)}, 3–5
Win	39.	27 November 2000	Mallorca, Spain	Clay	(Czech Republic) Lenka Novotná	(Argentina) Erica Krauth (Argentina) Vanesa Krauth	4–1, 4–2, 5–3
Win	40.	11 December 2000	Mallorca, Spain	Clay	(Czech Republic) Olga Blahotová	(Czech Republic) Iveta Benešová (Czech Republic) Lenka Novotná	5–3, 2–4, 0–4, 4–1, 4–2
Win	41.	12 February 2001	Faro, Portugal	Hard	(Czech Republic) Olga Blahotová	(Austria) Daniela Klemenschits (Austria) Sandra Klemenschits	6–0, 6–2
Win	42.	2 April 2001	Makarska, Croatia	Clay	(Czech Republic) Petra Kučová	(Czech Republic) Zuzana Hejdová (Bosnia and Herzegovina) Mervana Jugić-Salkić	1–6, 6–2, 6–3
Win	43.	16 April 2001	Hvar, Croatia	Clay	(Czech Republic) Petra Kučová	(Netherlands) Natasha Galouza (Netherlands) Lotty Seelen	3–6, 6–1, 6–3
Win	44.	30 April 2001	Nitra, Slovakia	Clay	(Czech Republic) Petra Kučová	(Slovakia) Kristína Michalaková (Slovakia) Katarína Kachlíková	6–4, 6–0
Loss	45.	28 May 2001	Doksy, Czech Republic	Clay	(Czech Republic) Olga Blahotová	(Czech Republic) Milena Nekvapilová (Czech Republic) Hana Šromová	6–2, 4–6, 1–6
Loss	46.	10 July 2001	Bella Cup, Poland	Clay	(Czech Republic) Lenka Novotná	(Czech Republic) Blanka Kumbárová (Czech Republic) Petra Kučová	6–7^{(5)}, 3–6
Win	47.	21 August 2001	Maribor, Slovenia	Clay	(Czech Republic) Olga Blahotová	(Serbia and Montenegro) Katarina Mišić (Spain) Mariam Ramon Climent	6–2, 6–2
Loss	48.	27 August 2001	Bad Saulgau, Germany	Clay	(Czech Republic) Lenka Novotná	(Czech Republic) Renata Kučerová (Czech Republic) Zuzana Kučová	w/o
Win	49.	1 October 2001	Plzeň, Czech Republic	Clay	(Czech Republic) Olga Blahotová	(Austria) Daniela Klemenschits (Austria) Sandra Klemenschits	6–2, 6–3
Win	50.	8 October 2001	Makarska, Croatia	Clay	(Czech Republic) Dominika Luzarová	(Czech Republic) Lenka Novotná (Czech Republic) Pavlina Tichá	6–2, 7–5
Win	51.	3 December 2001	Prague, Czech Republic	Carpet (i)	(Czech Republic) Olga Blahotová	(Czech Republic) Renata Kučerová (Czech Republic) Zuzana Hejdová	6–2, 6–3
Loss	52.	25 February 2002	Albufeira, Portugal	Hard	(Slovakia) Dominika Diešková	(Netherlands) Natasha Galouza (Netherlands) Susanne Trik	1–6, 5–7
Win	53.	17 March 2002	Cholet, France	Clay	(Belgium) Caroline Maes	(Belgium) Leslie Butkiewicz (Belgium) Patty Van Acker	4–1 ret.
Loss	54.	13 May 2002	Szczecin, Poland	Clay	(Czech Republic) Olga Blahotová	(Venezuela) Milagros Sequera (Canada) Vanessa Webb	7–6^{(5)}, 5–7, 3–6
Win	55.	21 May 2002	Rijeka, Croatia	Clay	(Czech Republic) Dominika Luzarová	(Austria) Yvonne Meusburger (Austria) Jenny Zika	6–3, 3–6, 6–3
Win	56.	10 June 2002	Vaduz, Liechtenstein	Clay	(Czech Republic) Olga Blahotová	(Ukraine) Yevgenia Savranska (Germany) Stefanie Weis	7–5, 6–1
Loss	57.	22 July 2002	Český Krumlov, Czech Republic	Clay	(Czech Republic) Milena Nekvapilová	(Slovenia) Tina Hergold (Hungary) Katalin Marosi	6–7^{(2)}, 5–7
Win	58.	30 July 2002	Bad Saulgau, Germany	Clay	(Czech Republic) Blanka Kumbárová	(Czech Republic) Jana Macurová (Germany) Lenka Novotná	6–2, 6–0
Win	59.	18 August 2002	Valašské Meziříčí, Czech Republic	Clay	(Czech Republic) Renata Kučerová	(Czech Republic) Milena Nekvapilová (Czech Republic) Hana Šromová	6–4, 6–1
Win	60.	2 September 2002	Denain, France	Clay	(Czech Republic) Olga Blahotová	(Ukraine) Yuliya Beygelzimer (Luxembourg) Claudine Schaul	6–3, 6–0
Win	61.	15 September 2002	Tbilisi, Georgia	Clay	(Czech Republic) Eva Birnerová	(Russia) Goulnara Fattakhetdinova (Russia) Maria Kondratieva	6–4, 6–0
Win	62.	29 September 2002	Trenčianske Teplice, Slovakia	Clay	(Czech Republic) Jana Macurová	(Czech Republic) Milena Nekvapilová (Czech Republic) Hana Šromová	2–1 ret
Loss	63.	21 October 2002	Opole, Poland	Carpet (i)	(Czech Republic) Olga Blahotová	(Czech Republic) Eva Martincová (Czech Republic) Magdalena Zděnovcová	5–7, 6–7^{(5)}
Win	64.	11 November 2002	Puebla, Mexico	Hard	(Czech Republic) Olga Blahotová	(Argentina) Jorgelina Cravero (Mexico) Melissa Torres Sandoval	6–1, 4–6, 7–6^{(4)}
Win	65.	18 November 2002	Mexico City	Hard	(Czech Republic) Olga Blahotová	(Slovenia) Tina Hergold (Canada) Vanessa Webb	3–6, 6–3, 6–4
Loss	66.	27 January 2003	Ortisei, Italy	Carpet (i)	(Czech Republic) Olga Blahotová	(Germany) Vanessa Henke (Luxembourg) Claudine Schaul	1–6, 2–6
Win	67.	7 April 2003	Dinan, France	Clay (i)	(Czech Republic) Michaela Paštiková	(Russia) Goulnara Fattakhetdinova (Russia) Galina Fokina	1–6, 6–2, 6–3
Win	68.	21 April 2003	Hvar, Croatia	Clay (i)	(Czech Republic) Jana Macurová	(Turkey) İpek Şenoğlu (Czech Republic) Vladimíra Uhlířová	6–4, 3–6, 6–1
Win	69.	20 October 2003	Opole, Poland	Carpet (i)	(Czech Republic) Olga Blahotová	(Czech Republic) Zuzana Hejdová (Czech Republic) Hana Šromová	6–4, 6–3
Win	70.	2 November 2003	Mumbai, India	Hard	(Czech Republic) Hana Šromová	(India) Rushmi Chakravarthi (India) Sai Jayalakshmy Jayaram	6–1, 6–1
Loss	71.	25 November 2003	Prague, Czech Republic	Carpet (i)	(Czech Republic) Olga Blahotová	(Bosnia and Herzegovina) Mervana Jugić-Salkić (Croatia) Darija Jurak	5–7, 7–6^{(6)}, 3–6
Win	72.	26 January 2004	Belfort, France	Hard (i)	(Czech Republic) Olga Blahotová	(Netherlands) Kim Kilsdonk (France) Sophie Lefèvre	6–3, 6–2
Win	73.	2 February 2004	Ortisei, Italy	Carpet (i)	(Czech Republic) Olga Blahotová	(Bulgaria) Lubomira Bacheva (Germany) Angelika Rösch	6–1, 6–3
Loss	74.	17 February 2004	Redbridge, Great Britain	Hard (i)	(Czech Republic) Olga Blahotová	(Republic of Ireland) Claire Curran (Netherlands) Kim Kilsdonk	3–6, 6–3, 6–7^{(10)}
Win	75.	5 July 2004	Bella Cup, Poland	Clay	(Hungary) Kira Nagy	(Germany) Angelique Kerber (Poland) Marta Leśniak	6–4, 7–6^{(2)}
Win	76.	19 July 2004	Les Contamines, France	Hard	(France) Caroline Dhenin	(Australia) Evie Dominikovic (Hungary) Rita Kuti-Kis	6–4, 6–3
Win	77.	26 July 2004	Modena, Italy	Clay	(Czech Republic) Michaela Paštiková	(Bulgaria) Lubomira Bacheva (Czech Republic) Eva Birnerová	6–2, 6–3
Win	78.	15 November 2004	Prague, Czech Republic	Hard (i)	(Czech Republic) Michaela Paštiková	(Czech Republic) Lucie Hradecká (Czech Republic) Sandra Kleinová	6–3, 6–3
Loss	79.	23 November 2004	Poitiers, France	Hard (i)	(Czech Republic) Michaela Paštiková	(France) Stéphanie Cohen-Aloro (Tunisia) Selima Sfar	5–7, 4–6
Win	80.	28 June 2005	Fano, Italy	Clay	(Czech Republic) Michaela Paštiková	(Austria) Stefanie Haidner (Italy) Valentina Sulpizio	6–2, 6–0
Loss	81.	22 November 2005	ITF Opole, Poland	Carpet (i)	(Czech Republic) Lucie Hradecká	(Switzerland) Timea Bacsinszky (Belarus) Nadejda Ostrovskaya	4–6, 6–7^{(5)}
Win	82.	5 December 2005	Přerov Cup, Czech Republic	Carpet (i)	(Czech Republic) Lucie Hradecká	(Germany) Gréta Arn (Estonia) Margit Rüütel	3–6, 6–4, 6–4
Win	83.	13 December 2005	Dubai Tennis Challenge, United Arab Emirates	Hard	(Czech Republic) Hana Šromová	(Russia) Ekaterina Makarova (Russia) Olga Panova	7–5, 6–4
Win	84.	14 August 2006	ITF Rimini, Italy	Clay	(Bosnia and Herzegovina) Mervana Jugić-Salkić	(Belarus) Ekaterina Dzehalevich (Russia) Ekaterina Lopes	6–3, 1–6, 6–2
Loss	85.	3 December 2007	Přerov Cup, Czech Republic	Hard (i)	(Czech Republic) Michaela Paštiková	(Czech Republic) Veronika Chvojková (Czech Republic) Kateřina Vaňková	6–3, 4–6 [10–12]
Loss	86.	17 November 2008	ITF Odense, Denmark	Carpet (i)	(Bosnia and Herzegovina) Mervana Jugić-Salkić	(United Kingdom) Sarah Borwell (United States) Courtney Nagle	4–6, 4–6
Loss	87.	23 November 2014	ITF Zawada, Poland	Carpet (i)	(Czech Republic) Karolína Muchová	(Ukraine) Anhelina Kalinina (Ukraine) Anna Shkudun	0–6, 6–7^{(3)}

== Grand Slam doubles performance timeline ==
Key
W	F	SF	QF	#R	RR	Q#	DNQ	A	NH

(W) winner; (F) finalist; (SF) semifinalist; (QF) quarterfinalist; (#R) rounds 4, 3, 2, 1; (RR) round-robin stage; (Q#) qualification round; (DNQ) did not qualify; (A) absent; (NH) not held; (SR) strike rate (events won / competed); (W–L) win–loss record.

Tournament	2003	2004	2005	2006	2007	2008	Career W-L
Australian Open	A	A	SF	1R	1R	2R	5–4
French Open	A	1R	2R	1R	2R	1R	2–5
Wimbledon	A	1R	2R	1R	1R	1R	1–5
US Open	1R	1R	A	1R	1R	1R	0–5
Win–loss	0–1	0–3	6–3	0–4	1–4	1–4	8–19
