= Renata Kučerová =

Czech tennis player

- Full name: Renata Kučerová
- Country (sports): Czech Republic
- Born: 15 July 1979 (age 45); Czechoslovakia
- Retired: 2005
- Prize money: $67,755

Singles
- Career record: 119–121
- Career titles: 2 ITF
- Highest ranking: No. 177 (31 January 2000)

Grand Slam singles results
- Australian Open: Q2 (2000)
- French Open: Q1 (2000)
- Wimbledon: —
- US Open: Q1 (1999)

Doubles
- Career record: 70–50
- Career titles: 5 ITF
- Highest ranking: No. 284 (4 March 2002)

Renata Kučerová (born 15 July 1979) is a former Czech tennis player.

Kučerová won two singles and five doubles titles on the ITF tour in her career. On 31 January 2000, she reached her best singles ranking of world number 177. On 4 March 2002, she peaked at world number 284 in the doubles rankings.

== ITF finals (7–9) ==
=== Singles (2–2) ===
Legend $100,000 tournaments $75,000 tournaments $50,000 tournaments $25,000 tournaments $10,000 tournaments	Finals by surface Hard (1–0) Clay (0–2) Grass (0–0) Carpet (1–0)

Outcome	No.	Date	Tournament	Surface	Opponent	Score
Winner	1.	8 February 1999	Rogaška Slatina, Slovenia	Carpet (i)	(Czech Republic) Radka Pelikánová	7–6^{(7–0)}, 6–3
Runner-up	1.	10 July 2000	Darmstadt, Germany	Clay	(Germany) Miriam Schnitzer	4–6, 3–6
Winner	2.	11 December 2000	Prague-Průhonice, Czech Republic	Hard (i)	(France) Elsa Morel	4–1, 4–0, 4–1
Runner-up	2.	1 October 2001	Plzeň, Czech Republic	Clay	(Germany) Angelika Bachmann	2–6, 6–3, 2–6

=== Doubles (5–7) ===
Legend $100,000 tournaments $75,000 tournaments $50,000 tournaments $25,000 tournaments $10,000 tournaments	Finals by surface Hard (1–1) Clay (3–5) Grass (0–0) Carpet (1–1)

Outcome	No.	Date	Tournament	Surface	Partner	Opponents	Score
Winner	1.	14 July 1997	Toruń, Poland	Clay	(Slovakia) Martina Suchá	(Czech Republic) Petra Kučová (Slovakia) Lenka Zacharová	6–3, 6–3
Runner-up	1.	1 September 1997	Olsztyn, Poland	Clay	(Poland) Dominika Olszewska	(Czech Republic) Jana Ondrouchová (Czech Republic) Alena Vašková	2–6, 3–6
Runner-up	2.	28 September 1998	Supetar, Croatia	Clay	(Czech Republic) Blanka Kumbárová	(Czech Republic) Olga Blahotová (Czech Republic) Petra Kučová	1–6, 2–6
Winner	2.	30 November 1998	Přerov, Czech Republic	Carpet (i)	(Czech Republic) Libuše Průšová	(Czech Republic) Olga Blahotová (Czech Republic) Eva Martincová	6–7^{(3–7)}, 6–1, 6–2
Winner	3.	18 January 1999	Båstad 1, Sweden	Hard (i)	(Czech Republic) Blanka Kumbárová	(Finland) Hanna-Katri Aalto (Finland) Kirsi Lampinen	6–4, 6–3
Runner-up	3.	11 June 2001	Grado, Italy	Clay	(Czech Republic) Eva Martincová	(Croatia) Jelena Kostanić (Romania) Magda Mihalache	7–5, 3–6, 5–7
Runner-up	4.	25 June 2001	Mont-de-Marsan, France	Clay	(Czech Republic) Hana Šromová	(Netherlands) Anousjka van Exel (Slovakia) Zuzana Váleková	1–6, 1–6
Winner	4.	27 August 2001	Bad Saulgau, Germany	Clay	(Slovakia) Zuzana Kučová	(Czech Republic) Gabriela Navrátilová (Czech Republic) Lenka Novotná	w/o
Runner-up	5.	3 December 2001	Prague-Průhonice, Czech Republic	Carpet (i)	(Czech Republic) Zuzana Hejdová	(Czech Republic) Olga Blahotová (Czech Republic) Gabriela Navrátilová	2–6, 3–6
Runner-up	6.	11 February 2002	Bergamo, Italy	Hard (i)	(Czech Republic) Zuzana Hejdová	(Italy) Silvia Disderi (Austria) Stefanie Haidner	5–7, 3–6
Runner-up	7.	3 June 2002	Staré Splavy, Czech Republic	Clay	(Austria) Stefanie Haidner	(Czech Republic) Eva Erbová (Czech Republic) Lenka Novotná	6–7^{(5–7)}, 0–6
Winner	5.	19 August 2002	Valašské Meziříčí, Czech Republic	Clay	(Czech Republic) Gabriela Navrátilová	(Czech Republic) Milena Nekvapilová (Czech Republic) Hana Šromová	6–4, 6–1
