= Casey Dellacqua career statistics =

Career finals
Discipline	Type	Won	Lost	Total
Singles	Grand Slam	–	–	–
Singles	Summer Olympics	–	–	–
Singles	WTA Finals (Note: Formerly known as: Virginia Slims Championships (until 1995); WTA Tour Championships (until 2014))	–	–	–
Singles	WTA Elite (Note: Elite tier: WTA Tournament of Champions (2009–14); WTA Elite Trophy (2015–present))	–	–	–
Singles	WTA 1000 (Note: Formerly known as: Category 4 & 5 & 6 (until 1990); Tier I (until 2009); WTA Premier Mandatory and 5 (until 2021))	–	–	–
Singles	WTA 500 (Note: Formerly known as: Category 3 (until 1990); Tier II (until 2009); WTA Premier (until 2021))	–	–	–
Singles	WTA 250 (Note: Formerly known as: Category 1 & 2 (until 1990); Tier III & IV & V (until 2009); WTA International (until 2021))	–	–	–
Singles	Total	–	–	–
Doubles	Grand Slam	0	7	7
Doubles	Summer Olympics	–	–	–
Doubles	WTA Finals	–	–	–
Doubles	WTA Elite	–	–	–
Doubles	WTA 1000	1	1	2
Doubles	WTA 500	1	5	6
Doubles	WTA 250	5	0	5
Doubles	Total	7	13	20
Mixed doubles	Grand Slam	1	0	1
Mixed doubles	Total	1	0	1
Total		8	13	21

This is a list of the main career statistics of professional Australian tennis player, Casey Dellacqua. To date, Dellacqua has won eight career doubles titles: one mixed doubles title, partnering with Scott Lipsky, at the 2011 French Open, and seven WTA Tour doubles titles including one Premier Mandatory title with Yaroslava Shvedova at the 2015 Madrid Open. Other highlights of Dellacqua's career include reaching the doubles finals of all four Grand Slam events; a quarterfinal finish in singles at the 2014 Indian Wells Open and fourth round appearances at the 2008 Australian Open, 2014 Australian Open, and US Open, respectively. Dellacqua achieved a career-high singles ranking of world No. 26, on 29 September 2014, and later a career-high doubles ranking of No. 3, on 1 February 2016.

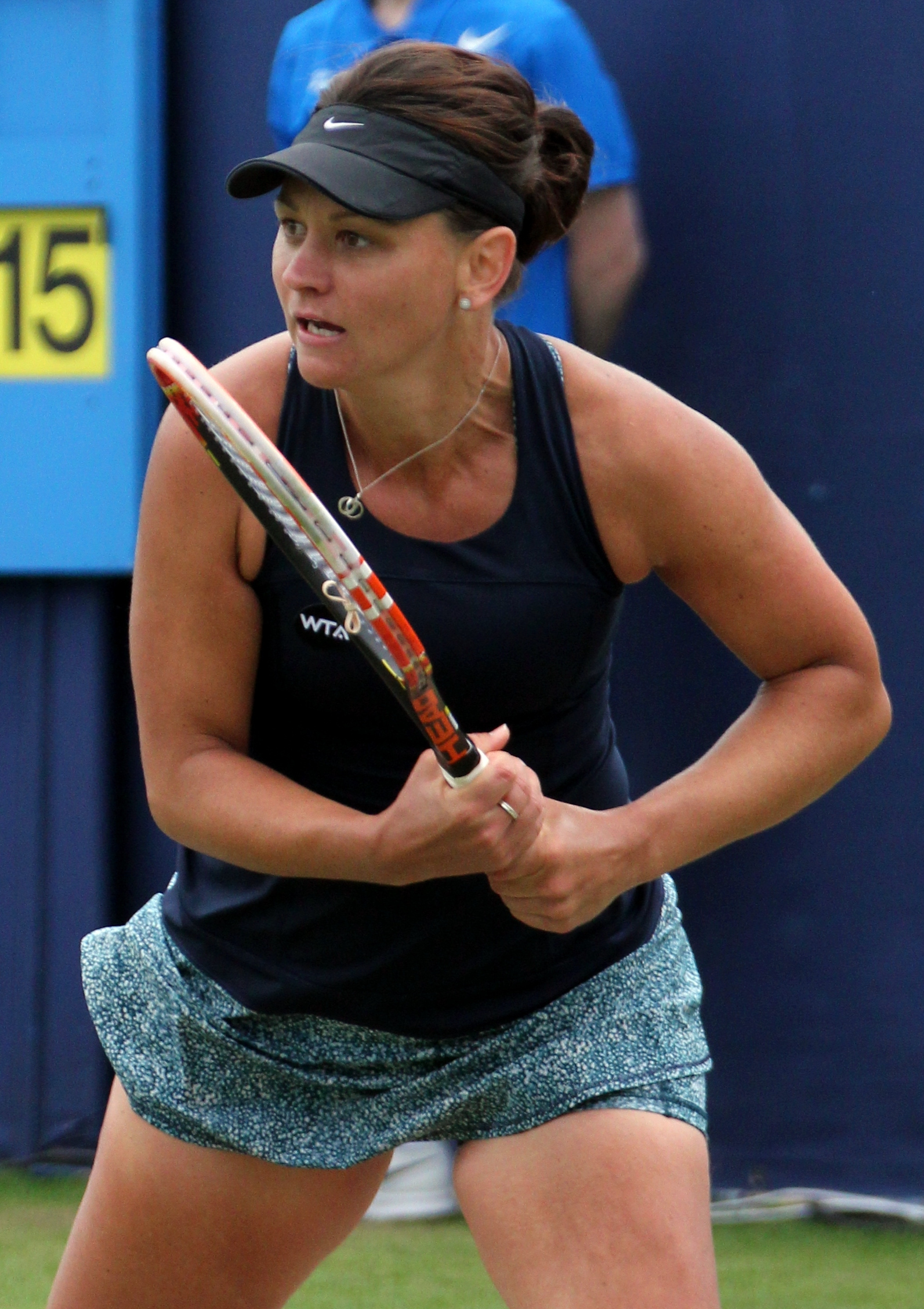
Dellacqua at the 2015 Eastbourne International.

== Performance timelines ==
Key
W	F	SF	QF	#R	RR	Q#	P#	DNQ	A	Z#	PO	G	S	B	NMS	NTI	P	NH

(W) winner; (F) finalist; (SF) semifinalist; (QF) quarterfinalist; (#R) rounds 4, 3, 2, 1; (RR) round-robin stage; (Q#) qualification round; (P#) preliminary round; (DNQ) did not qualify; (A) absent; (Z#) Davis/Fed Cup Zonal Group (with number indication) or (PO) play-off; (G) gold, (S) silver or (B) bronze Olympic/Paralympic medal; (NMS) not a Masters tournament; (NTI) not a Tier I tournament; (P) postponed; (NH) not held; (SR) strike rate (events won / competed); (W–L) win–loss record.
To avoid confusion and double counting, these charts are updated at the conclusion of a tournament or when the player's participation has ended.

Only main-draw results in WTA Tour, Grand Slam tournaments, Billie Jean King Cup (Fed Cup), Hopman Cup and Olympic Games are included in win–loss records.

=== Singles ===
Tournament	2003	2004	2005	2006	2007	2008	2009	2010	2011	2012	2013	2014	2015	SR	W–L	Win%
Grand Slam tournaments
Australian Open	1R	1R	1R	1R	1R	4R	1R	3R	A	2R	1R	4R	2R		9–11	
French Open	A	A	A	Q1	1R	3R	A	A	1R	1R	Q2	2R	1R		3–6	
Wimbledon	Q1	A	A	Q1	1R	3R	A	1R	Q1	1R	Q3	2R	3R		5–6	
US Open	A	A	A	Q1	2R	1R	A	A	1R	2R	1R	4R	1R		5–7	
Win–loss	0–1	0–1	0–1	0–1	1–4	7–4	0–1	2–2	0–2	2–4	0–2	8–4	3–4		22–30	
National representation
Summer Olympics	NH	A	NH			2R	NH			A	NH				1–1	
WTA 1000 + former^{†} tournaments
Dubai / Qatar Open (Note: The first Premier 5 event of the year has switched back and forth between the Dubai Tennis Championships and the Qatar Total Open since 2009. Dubai was classified as a Premier 5 event from 2009 to 2011 before being succeeded by Doha for the 2012–2014 period. In 2015, Dubai regained its Premier 5 status while Doha was demoted to Premier status. The Premier 5 tournaments were reclassified as WTA 1000 tournaments in 2021.)	NMS					A	1R	A	A	Q2	A	A	2R		0–0	
Indian Wells Open	A	A	A	A	A	4R	A	A	A	1R	1R	QF	A		6–4	
Miami Open	A	A	A	A	A	1R	A	1R	A	A	Q1	3R	2R		2–4	
Berlin / Madrid Open (Note: In 2009, the Berlin Open was replaced by the Madrid Open. The Premier Mandatory tournaments were reclassified as WTA 1000 tournaments in 2021.)	A	A	A	A	A	1R	A	A	Q1	A	A	A	2R		1–1	
Italian Open	A	A	A	A	A	A	A	A	Q1	A	A	2R	A		1–1	
Canadian Open	A	A	A	A	A	A	A	A	A	A	A	2R	Q2		1–1	
Cincinnati Open	NMS						A	A	3R	A	A	1R	1R		2–3	
Pan Pacific / Wuhan Open (Note: In 2014, the Toray Pan Pacific Open was downgraded to a Premier event and replaced by the Wuhan Open. The Premier 5 tournaments were reclassified as WTA 1000 tournaments in 2021.)	A	A	A	A	A	Q2	A	A	A	Q1	2R	3R	Q1		2–1	
China Open	NH	NMS					A	A	A	Q1	A	1R	1R		0–2	
Charleston Open^{†}	A	A	A	A	A	2R	NMS									
Career statistics
Tournaments	1	2	2	4	12	17	3	5	5	14	8	17	10	Career total: 100		
Overall win–loss	0–1	0–2	1–2	3–4	6–12	17–17	0–3	2–5	3–5	10–13	1–8	26–17	10–14		78–99	
Win %	0%	0%	33%	43%	33%	50%	0%	29%	38%	43%	11%	60%	42%	44%		
Year-end ranking	275	234	223	157	78	55	1004	226	156	88	131	29	112			

=== Doubles ===
Tournament	2003	2004	2005	2006	2007	2008	2009	2010	2011	2012	2013	2014	2015	2016	2017	2018	SR	W–L	Win%
Grand Slam tournaments
Australian Open	2R	2R	1R	2R	1R	1R	SF	1R	A	1R	F	2R	2R	A	QF	2R		17–14	
French Open	A	A	A	A	A	F	A	A	3R	2R	1R	QF	F	A	F	A		21–7	
Wimbledon	A	A	A	A	A	SF	A	1R	1R	2R	F	QF	QF	A	QF	A		19–8	
US Open	A	1R	A	A	2R	1R	A	A	1R	1R	F	1R	F	A	2R	A		12–9	
Win–loss	1–1	1–2	0–1	1–1	1–2	9–4	3–1	0–2	2–3	2–4	15–4	7–4	14–4	0–0	12–4	1–1		69–38	
National representation
Summer Olympics	NH	A	NH			1R	NH			1R	NH			A	NH			0–2	
Year-end championships
WTA Finals	did not qualify												A	DNQ	QF	DNQ		0–1	
WTA 1000 + former^{†} tournaments
Indian Wells Open	absent									QF	SF	QF	A	A	1R	A		7–4	
Miami Open	absent										1R	1R	1R	A	2R	A		1–4	
Madrid Open	not held						A	A	SF	A	A	A	W	A	A	A		8–1	
Italian Open	absent								1R	A	A	QF	2R	A	A	A		3–3	
Canadian Open	absent											1R	1R	A	1R	A		0–3	
Cincinnati Open	absent											1R	F	A	QF	A		5–3	
Pan Pacific / Wuhan Open	not held											1R	2R	A	SF	A		3–1	
China Open	NH	not Tier I					absent					2R	SF	A	2R	A		2–2	
Career statistics
Tournaments	2	6	3	5	10	14	2	4	9	15	10	10	8	0	18	3	103		
Titles	0	0	0	0	0	0	0	0	0	0	2	1	1	0	3	0	7		
Finals	0	0	0	0	0	1	1	0	0	0	5	2	5	0	6	0	20		
Overall win–loss	0–2	4–5	1–3	3–5	4–9	16–14	6–2	1–4	10–9	9–15	26–8	20–13	21–12	0–0	12–5	5–3		138–107	
Win %	0%	44%	25%	38%	31%	53%	75%	20%	53%	38%	76%	61%	64%	0%	70%	63%	56%		
Year-end ranking	224	117	141	121	123	21	65	251	56	67	10	35	5	273	10				

=== Mixed doubles ===
Tournament	2003	2004	2005	2006	2007	2008	2009	2010	2011	2012	2013	2014	2015	2016	2017	2018	W–L
Australian Open	A	1R	A	1R	2R	A	A	1R	A	2R	1R	1R	QF	A	2R	2R	6–10
French Open	A	A	A	A	A	A	A	A	W	A	1R	1R	A	A	SF	A	8–3
Wimbledon	A	A	A	A	A	3R	A	A	2R	A	3R	QF	2R	A	2R	A	7–6
US Open	A	A	A	A	A	2R	A	A	A	A	1R	2R	A	A	1R	A	2–4
Win–loss	0–0	0–1	0–0	0–1	1–1	3–2	0–0	0–1	6–1	1–1	1–4	3–4	3–2	0–0	4–4	1–1	23–23

== Significant finals ==
=== Grand Slams ===
==== Doubles: 7 (7 runner-ups) ====
Result	Year	Championship	Surface	Partner	Opponents	Score
Loss	2008	French Open	Clay	(Italy) Francesca Schiavone	(Spain) Anabel Medina Garrigues (Spain) Virginia Ruano Pascual	6–2, 5–7, 4–6
Loss	2013	Australian Open	Hard	(Australia) Ashleigh Barty	(Italy) Sara Errani (Italy) Roberta Vinci	2–6, 6–3, 2–6
Loss	2013	Wimbledon	Grass	(Australia) Ashleigh Barty	(Chinese Taipei) Hsieh Su-wei (China) Peng Shuai	6–7^{(1–7)}, 1–6
Loss	2013	US Open	Hard	(Australia) Ashleigh Barty	(Czech Republic) Andrea Hlaváčková (Czech Republic) Lucie Hradecká	7–6^{(7–4)}, 1–6, 4–6
Loss	2015	French Open (2)	Clay	(Kazakhstan) Yaroslava Shvedova	(United States) Bethanie Mattek-Sands (Czech Republic) Lucie Šafářová	6–3, 4–6, 2–6
Loss	2015	US Open (2)	Hard	(Kazakhstan) Yaroslava Shvedova	(Switzerland) Martina Hingis (India) Sania Mirza	3–6, 3–6
Loss	2017	French Open (3)	Clay	(Australia) Ashleigh Barty	(United States) Bethanie Mattek-Sands (Czech Republic) Lucie Šafářová	2–6, 1–6

==== Mixed doubles: 1 (title) ====
Result	Year	Championship	Surface	Partner	Opponents	Score
Win	2011	French Open	Clay	(United States) Scott Lipsky	(Slovenia) Katarina Srebotnik (Serbia) Nenad Zimonjić	7–6^{(8–6)}, 4–6, [10–7]

=== WTA 1000 ===
==== Doubles: 2 (1 title, 1 runner-up) ====
Result	Year	Tournament	Surface	Partner	Opponents	Score
Win	2015	Madrid Open	Clay	(Kazakhstan) Yaroslava Shvedova	(Spain) Garbiñe Muguruza (Spain) Carla Suárez Navarro	6–3, 6–7^{(4–7)}, [10–5]
Loss	2015	Cincinnati Open	Hard	(Kazakhstan) Yaroslava Shvedova	(Chinese Taipei) Chan Hao-ching (Chinese Taipei) Chan Yung-jan	5–7, 4–6

== WTA Tour finals ==
=== Doubles: 20 (7 titles, 13 runner-ups) ===
Legend Grand Slam tournaments (0–7) WTA 1000 (Premier 5 / Premier M) (1–1) WTA 500 (Premier) (1–5) WTA 250 (International) (5–0)	Finals by surface Hard (2–6) Clay (3–4) Grass (2–3)

Result	W–L	Date	Tournament	Tier	Surface	Partner	Opponents	Score
Loss	1.	6 June 2008	French Open, France	Grand Slam	Clay	(Italy) Francesca Schiavone	(Spain) Anabel Medina Garrigues (Spain) Virginia Ruano Pascual	6–2, 5–7, 4–6
Loss	2.	16 January 2009	Sydney International, Australia	Premier	Hard	(France) Nathalie Dechy	(Chinese Taipei) Hsieh Su-wei (China) Peng Shuai	0–6, 1–6
Loss	3.	25 January 2013	Australian Open, Australia	Grand Slam	Hard	(Australia) Ashleigh Barty	(Italy) Sara Errani (Italy) Roberta Vinci	2–6, 6–3, 2–6
Win	1.	3 February 2013	Pattaya Open, Thailand	International	Hard	(Japan) Kimiko Date-Krumm	(Uzbekistan) Akgul Amanmuradova (Russia) Alexandra Panova	6–3, 6–2
Win	2.	16 June 2013	Birmingham Classic, UK	International	Grass	(Australia) Ashleigh Barty	(Zimbabwe) Cara Black (New Zealand) Marina Erakovic	7–5, 6–4
Loss	4.	6 July 2013	Wimbledon Championships, UK	Grand Slam	Grass	(Australia) Ashleigh Barty	(Chinese Taipei) Hsieh Su-wei (China) Peng Shuai	6–7^{(1–7)}, 1–6
Loss	5.	9 September 2013	US Open, United States	Grand Slam	Hard	(Australia) Ashleigh Barty	(Czech Republic) Andrea Hlaváčková (Czech Republic) Lucie Hradecká	7–6^{(7–4)}, 1–6, 4–6
Win	3.	24 May 2014	Internationaux de Strasbourg, France	International	Clay	(Australia) Ashleigh Barty	(Argentina) Tatiana Búa (Chile) Daniela Seguel	4–6, 7–5, [10–4]
Loss	6.	15 June 2014	Birmingham Classic, UK	Premier	Grass	(Australia) Ashleigh Barty	(United States) Raquel Kops-Jones (United States) Abigail Spears	6–7^{(1–7)}, 1–6
Loss	7.	12 April 2015	Charleston Open, United States	Premier	Clay	(Croatia) Darija Jurak	(Switzerland) Martina Hingis (India) Sania Mirza	0–6, 4–6
Win	4.	9 May 2015	Madrid Open, Spain	Premier M	Clay	(Kazakhstan) Yaroslava Shvedova	(Spain) Garbiñe Muguruza (Spain) Carla Suárez Navarro	6–3, 6–7^{(4–7)}, [10–5]
Loss	8.	7 June 2015	French Open, France	Grand Slam	Clay	(Kazakhstan) Yaroslava Shvedova	(United States) Bethanie Mattek-Sands (Czech Republic) Lucie Šafářová	6–3, 4–6, 2–6
Loss	9.	23 August 2015	Cincinnati Open, United States	Premier 5	Hard	(Kazakhstan) Yaroslava Shvedova	(Chinese Taipei) Chan Hao-ching (Chinese Taipei) Chan Yung-jan	5–7, 4–6
Loss	10.	13 September 2015	US Open, New York	Grand Slam	Hard	(Kazakhstan) Yaroslava Shvedova	(Switzerland) Martina Hingis (India) Sania Mirza	3–6, 3–6
Win	5.	4 March 2017	Malaysian Open, Kuala Lumpur	International	Hard	(Australia) Ashleigh Barty	(United States) Nicole Melichar (Japan) Makoto Ninomiya	7–6 ^{(7–5)}, 6–3
Win	6.	27 May 2017	Internationaux de Strasbourg, France (2)	International	Clay	(Australia) Ashleigh Barty	(Chinese Taipei) Chan Hao-ching (Chinese Taipei) Chan Yung-jan	6–4, 6–2
Loss	11.	11 June 2017	French Open, France	Grand Slam	Clay	(Australia) Ashleigh Barty	(United States) Bethanie Mattek-Sands (Czech Republic) Lucie Šafářová	2–6, 1–6
Win	7.	25 June 2017	Birmingham Classic, UK (2)	Premier	Grass	(Australia) Ashleigh Barty	(Chinese Taipei) Chan Hao-ching (China) Zhang Shuai	6–1, 2–6, [10–8]
Loss	12.	1 July 2017	Eastbourne International, UK	Premier	Grass	(Australia) Ashleigh Barty	(Chinese Taipei) Chan Yung-jan (Switzerland) Martina Hingis	3–6, 5–7
Loss	13.	26 August 2017	Connecticut Open, United States	Premier	Hard	(Australia) Ashleigh Barty	(Canada) Gabriela Dabrowski (China) Xu Yifan	6–3, 3–6, [8–10]

== ITF Circuit finals ==
=== Singles: 27 (22 titles, 5 runner-ups) ===
Legend $50,000 tournaments $25,000 tournaments $10,000 tournaments	Finals by surface Hard (17–4) Clay (2–1) Grass (3–0)

Result	W–L	Date	Tournament	Tier	Surface	Opponent	Score
Win	1.	2 November 2003	ITF Dalby, Australia	25,000	Hard	(Netherlands) Anousjka van Exel	6–3, 2–6, 7–5
Win	2.	7 March 2004	Warrnambool, Australia	10,000	Grass	(Australia) Nicole Sewell	6–3, 3–6, 6–2
Loss	1.	1 May 2005	Hamanako, Japan	25,000	Hard	(Japan) Ryōko Fuda	1–4 ret.
Win	3.	25 September 2005	Mackay, Australia	25,000	Hard	(Argentina) María José Argeri	1–6, 6–3, 6–0
Win	4.	2 October 2005	Rockhampton, Australia	25,000	Hard	(Australia) Beti Sekulovski	6–1, 6–4
Win	5.	13 November 2005	Port Pirie, Australia	25,000	Hard	(Australia) Cindy Watson	6–3, 7–5
Loss	2.	8 October 2006	Traralgon, Australia	25,000	Hard	(United States) Raquel Kops-Jones	4–6, 2–6
Loss	3.	15 October 2006	Melbourne, Australia	25,000	Hard	(New Zealand) Marina Erakovic	1–6, 6–0, 4–6
Win	6.	12 November 2006	Mount Gambier, Australia	25,000	Hard	(South Africa) Natalie Grandin	6–1, 6–4
Win	7.	19 November 2006	Port Pirie, Australia	25,000	Hard	(South Africa) Natalie Grandin	6–4, 6–2
Win	8.	18 February 2007	Melbourne, Australia	25,000	Clay	(Australia) Christina Wheeler	6–3, 6–1
Win	9.	18 March 2007	Perth, Australia	25,000	Hard	(Japan) Yurika Sema	6–2, 6–1
Win	10.	25 March 2007	Kalgoorlie, Australia	25,000	Hard	(Slovenia) Maša Zec-Peškirič	6–2, 6–4
Loss	4.	17 April 2007	Calvià, Spain	25,000	Clay	(Spain) María José Martínez Sánchez	1–6, 7–6, 5–7
Loss	5.	13 May 2007	Fukuoka, Japan	50,000	Hard	(Chinese Taipei) Chan Yung-jan	4–6, 4–6
Win	11.	19 August 2007	Bronx, United States	50,000	Hard	(United States) Ahsha Rolle	7–5, 2–0 ret.
Win	12.	21 February 2010	Mildura, Australia	25,000	Grass	(Australia) Sally Peers	7–5, 6–0
Win	13.	10 April 2011	Bundaberg, Australia	25,000	Clay	(Australia) Olivia Rogowska	6–2, 6–3
Win	14.	18 September 2011	Cairns, Australia	25,000	Hard	(Poland) Sandra Zaniewska	6–4, 7–6^{(7–3)}
Win	15.	25 September 2011	Darwin, Australia	25,000	Hard	(Japan) Akiko Omae	6–1, 6–2
Win	16.	9 October 2011	Esperance, Australia	25,000	Hard	(Australia) Olivia Rogowska	6–2, 6–1
Win	17.	16 October 2011	Kalgoorlie, Australia	25,000	Hard	(Australia) Monique Adamczak	6–2, 6–2
Win	18.	20 November 2011	Traralgon, Australia	25,000	Hard	(New Zealand) Sacha Jones	7–5, 7–6^{(8–6)}
Win	19.	18 December 2011	Bendigo, Australia	25,000	Hard	(Australia) Isabella Holland	6–2, 6–2
Win	20.	13 May 2012	Fukuoka, Japan	50,000	Grass	(Australia) Monique Adamczak	6–4, 6–1
Win	21.	27 October 2013	Bendigo, Australia	50,000	Hard	(Thailand) Noppawan Lertcheewakarn	6–4, 6–4
Win	22.	3 November 2013	Bendigo, Australia	50,000	Hard	(Australia) Tammi Patterson	6–3, 6–1

=== Doubles: 33 (23 titles, 10 runner-ups) ===
Legend $100,000 tournaments $75,000 tournaments $50,000 tournaments $25,000 tournaments $10,000 tournaments	Finals by surface Hard (14–7) Clay (4–1) Grass (4–2) Carpet (1–0)

Result	W–L	Date	Tournament	Tier	Surface	Partnering	Opponents	Score
Runner-up	1.	11 March 2002	ITF Benalla, Australia	10,000	Grass	(Germany) Svenja Weidemann	(Australia) Nicole Kriz (Australia) Sarah Stone	5–7, 1–6
Winner	1.	1 November 2003	ITF Dalby, Australia	25,000	Hard	(Australia) Evie Dominikovic	(United States) Elizabeth Schmidt (Netherlands) Anousjka Van Exel	6–7, 6–2, 6–1
Winner	2.	28 February 2004	Bendigo International, Australia	25,000	Hard	(Australia) Nicole Sewell	(Israel) Shahar Pe'er (Indonesia) Wynne Prakusya	6–2, 1–6, 6–2
Loss	2.	6 March 2004	Warrnambool, Australia	10,000	Grass	(Australia) Jaslyn Hewitt	(New Zealand) Eden Marama (New Zealand) Paula Marama	3–6, 6–4, 2–6
Winner	3.	24 July 2004	Schenectady, United States	50,000	Hard	(Australia) Nicole Sewell	(United States) Ansley Cargill (United States) Julie Ditty	3–6, 7–6, 6–2
Loss	3.	1 August 2004	Lexington Challenger, United States	25,000	Hard	(Australia) Nicole Sewell	(Republic of Ireland) Claire Curran (South Africa) Natalie Grandin	6–7, 4–6
Loss	4.	23 October 2004	Rockhampton, Australia	25,000	Hard	(Australia) Nicole Sewell	(Australia) Daniella Dominikovic (Australia) Evie Dominikovic	5–7, 2–6
Winner	4.	3 November 2004	Port Pirie, Australia	25,000	Hard	(United States) Sunitha Rao	(Australia) Daniella Dominikovic (Australia) Evie Dominikovic	4–6, 6–3, 7–6
Winner	5.	26 February 2007	Bendigo International, Australia	50,000	Hard	(Australia) Trudi Musgrave	(Australia) Beti Sekulovski (Australia) Cindy Watson	6–4, 7–6
Winner	6.	4 June 2005	Galatina, Italy	25,000	Clay	(Australia) Lucia Gonzalez	(Slovakia) Jarmila Gajdošová (Belarus) Tatiana Poutchek	6–4, 6–3
Runner-up	5.	13 August 2005	Wuxi, China	25,000	Hard	(Australia) Sophie Ferguson	(South Korea) Jeon Mi-ra (Indonesia) Wynne Prakusya	2–6, 6–7
Winner	7.	24 September 2005	Mackay, Australia	25,000	Hard	(Australia) Daniella Dominikovic	(Australia) Monique Adamczak (Australia) Olivia Lukaszewicz	7–6, 7–6
Winner	8.	1 October 2005	Rockhampton, Australia	25,000	Hard	(Australia) Daniella Dominikovic	(Australia) Beti Sekulovski (Sweden) Aleksandra Sndovic	6–4, 6–2
Winner	9.	15 October 2005	Lyneham, Australia	25,000	Clay	(Australia) Daniella Dominikovic	(Australia) Alison Bai (Australia) Jenny Swift	6–4, 6–3
Runner-up	6.	19 November 2005	Nuriootpa, South Australia, Australia	25,000	Hard	(Australia) Trudi Musgrave	(Germany) Gréta Arn (Russia) Anastasia Rodionova	4–6, 6–1, 5–7
Winner	10.	4 March 2006	Las Vegas Open, United States	75,000	Hard	(Australia) Nicole Pratt	(Brazil) Maria Fernanda Alves (Ukraine) Tatiana Perebiynis	w/o
Winner	11.	9 June 2006	Surbiton Trophy, Great Britain	25,000	Grass	(Australia) Trudi Musgrave	(Thailand) Tamarine Tanasugarn (Chinese Taipei) Hsieh Su-wei	6–3, 6–3
Runner-up	7.	7 October 2006	Traralgon, Australia	25,000	Hard	(United States) Sunitha Rao	(United States) Raquel Kops-Jones (Australia) Christina Horiatopoulos	2–6, 6–7
Winner	12.	14 October 2006	Melbourne, Australia	25,000	Hard	(United States) Sunitha Rao	(Australia) Daniella Dominikovic (Australia) Evie Dominikovic	6–3, 6–2
Winner	13.	17 March 2007	Perth, Australia	25,000	Hard	(Australia) Emily Hewson	(Australia) Trudi Musgrave (Australia) Christina Wheeler	6–4, 4–6, 6–2
Runner-up	8.	29 July 2007	Lexington Challenger, United States	50,000	Hard	(South Africa) Natalie Grandin	(Hungary) Melinda Czink (United States) Lindsay Lee-Waters	2–6, 6–7
Winner	14.	21 February 2010	Mildura, Australia	25,000	Grass	(Australia) Jessica Moore	(Australia) Jarmila Groth (Australia) Jade Hopper	6–2, 7–6
Winner	15.	7 March 2010	Sydney, Australia	25,000	Hard	(Australia) Jessica Moore	(Australia) Sophie Ferguson (Australia) Trudi Musgrave	w/o
Winner	16.	27 February 2011	Mildura, Australia	25,000	Grass	(Australia) Olivia Rogowska	(Japan) Rika Fujiwara (Japan) Kumiko Iijima	4–6, 7–6, [10–4]
Winner	17.	4 March 2011	Sydney, Australia	25,000	Hard	(Australia) Olivia Rogowska	(Japan) Rika Fujiwara (Japan) Kumiko Iijima	3–6, 7–6, [10–4]
Winner	18.	3 April 2011	Ipswich, Australia	25,000	Clay	(Australia) Olivia Rogowska	(Japan) Miki Miyamura (Japan) Mari Tanaka	6–4, 6–4
Winner	19.	10 April 2011	Bundaberg, Australia	25,000	Clay	(Australia) Olivia Rogowska	(Australia) Daniella Dominikovic (Poland) Sandra Zaniewska	7–5, 6–4
Winner	20.	9 October 2011	Esperance, Australia	25,000	Hard	(Australia) Olivia Rogowska	(Australia) Monique Adamczak (Poland) Sandra Zaniewska	6–3, 6–2
Winner	21.	16 October 2011	Kalgoorlie, Australia	25,000	Hard	(Australia) Olivia Rogowska	(China) Xu Yifan (China) Zhang Kailin	6–1, 6–1
Runner-up	9.	20 May 2012	Prague Open, Czech Republic	100,000	Clay	(Uzbekistan) Akgul Amanmuradova	(France) Alizé Cornet (France) Virginie Razzano	2–6, 3–6
Winner	22.	9 June 2012	Nottingham Trophy, UK	75,000	Grass	(Greece) Eleni Daniilidou	(United Kingdom) Laura Robson (United Kingdom) Heather Watson	6–4, 6–2
Winner	23.	25 November 2012	Toyota World Challenge, Japan	75,000	Carpet (i)	(Australia) Ashleigh Barty	(Japan) Miki Miyamura (Thailand) Varatchaya Wongteanchai	6–1, 6–2
Runner-up	10.	28 February 2016	ITF Port Pirie, Australia	25,000	Hard	(Australia) Ashleigh Barty	(Chinese Taipei) Lee Ya-hsuan (Japan) Riko Sawayanagi	4–6, 5–7

== Junior Grand Slam tournament finals ==
=== Doubles: 1 (title) ===
Result	Year	Tournament	Surface	Partner	Opponents	Score
Win	2003	Australian Open	Hard	(Australia) Adriana Szili	(Czech Republic) Petra Cetkovská (Czech Republic) Barbora Strýcová	6–3, 4–4 ret.

== Fed Cup participation ==
=== Singles: 11 (6–5) ===
Edition	Round	Date	Location	Against	Surface	Opponent	W/L	Score
2006	Z1 PO	Apr 2006	Seoul, Korea	India	Hard (o)	(India) Shikha Uberoi	L	3–6, 2–6
2007	WG2 PO	Jul 2007	Ashmore, Australia	Ukraine	Hard (o)	(Ukraine) Yuliana Fedak	W	6–4, 6–2
2008	Z1	Feb 2008	Bangkok, Thailand	New Zealand	Hard (o)	(New Zealand) Sacha Jones	W	4–6, 6–4, 4–1 ret.
2008	Z1	Feb 2008	Bangkok, Thailand	Indonesia	Hard (o)	(Indonesia) Sandy Gumulya	L	6–7, 6–7
2008	Z1	Feb 2008	Bangkok, Thailand	India	Hard (o)	(India) Sunitha Rao	W	6–3, 7–5
2009	Z1	Feb 2009	Perth, Australia	Chinese Taipei	Hard (o)	(Chinese Taipei) Hwang I-hsuan	W	6–1, 6–1
2010	WG2 QF	Feb 2010	Adelaide, Australia	Spain	Hard (o)	(Spain) Anabel Medina Garrigues	L	2–6, 3–6
2014	WG QF	Feb 2014	Hobart, Australia	Russia	Hard (o)	(Russia) Irina Khromacheva	W	6–0, 6–2
2014	WG SF	Apr 2014	Brisbane, Australia	Germany	Hard (o)	(Germany) Angelique Kerber	L	1–6, 0–6
2015	WG PO	Apr 2015	's-Hertogenbosch, Netherlands	Netherlands	Clay (i)	(Netherlands) Arantxa Rus	W	7–5, 6–3
2015	WG PO	Apr 2015	's-Hertogenbosch, Netherlands	Netherlands	Clay (i)	(Netherlands) Kiki Bertens	L	2–6, 3–6

=== Doubles: 17 (13–4) ===
Edition	Round	Date	Location	Against	Surface	Partner	Opponents	W/L	Score
2008	Z1	Jan 2008	Bangkok, Thailand	New Zealand	Hard (o)	Rennae Stubbs	(New Zealand) Leanne Baker (New Zealand) Marina Erakovic	W	7–5, 6–2
2008	Z1	Jan 2008	Bangkok, Thailand	Indonesia	Hard (o)	Rennae Stubbs	(Indonesia) Vivien Silfany-Tony (Indonesia) Lavinia Tananta	W	6–2, 6–1
2008	Z1	Jan 2008	Bangkok, Thailand	India	Hard (o)	Rennae Stubbs	(India) Sunitha Rao (India) Shikha Uberoi	W	7–6, 6–0
2009	Z1	Feb 2009	Perth, Australia	(South Korea) Korea	Hard (o)	Rennae Stubbs	(South Korea) Chang Kyung-mi (South Korea) Jin-A Lee	W	6–0, 6–2
2009	Z1	Feb 2009	Perth, Australia	Thailand	Hard (o)	Rennae Stubbs	(Thailand) Noppawan Lertcheewakarn (Thailand) Varatchaya Wongteanchai	W	6–4, 6–2
2009	Z1 PO	Feb 2009	Perth, Australia	New Zealand	Hard (o)	Rennae Stubbs	(New Zealand) Shona Lee (New Zealand) Kairangi Vano	W	6–2, 6–2
2012	WG2	Feb 2012	Fribourg, Switzerland	Switzerland	Clay (i)	Jelena Dokić	(Switzerland) Belinda Bencic (Switzerland) Amra Sadiković	W	7–5, 6–4
2012	PO	22 April 2012	Stuttgart, Germany	Germany	Clay (i)	Jarmila Gajdošová	(Germany) Julia Görges (Germany) Andrea Petkovic	L	3–6, 4–6
2013	WG QF	10 February 2013	Ostrava, Czech Republic	Czech Republic	Hard (i)	Ashleigh Barty	(Czech Republic) Andrea Hlaváčková (Czech Republic) Lucie Hradecká	L	0–6, 6–7
2014	WG QF	9 February 2014	Hobart, Australia	Russia	Hard (o)	Ashleigh Barty	(Russia) Irina Khromacheva (Russia) Valeria Solovyeva	W	6–1, 6–3
2014	WG SF	20 April 2014	Brisbane, Australia	Germany	Hard (o)	Ashleigh Barty	(Germany) Julia Görges (Germany) Anna-Lena Grönefeld	W	6–2, 6–7, [10–2]
2015	WG QF	8 February 2015	Stuttgart, Germany	Germany	Hard (i)	Olivia Rogowska	(Germany) Julia Görges (Germany) Sabine Lisicki	L	7–6, 6–7, [6–10]
2015	PO	19 April 2015	's-Hertogenbosch, Netherlands	Netherlands	Clay (i)	Olivia Rogowska	(Netherlands) Richèl Hogenkamp (Netherlands) Michaëlla Krajicek	L	2–6, 6–7^{(3–7)}
2016	WG2	7 February 2016	Bratislava, Slovakia	Slovakia	Hard (i)	Samantha Stosur	(Slovakia) Jana Čepelová (Slovakia) Daniela Hantuchová	W	5–7, 6–1, 6–2
2017	WG2	12 February 2017	Kharkiv, Ukraine	Ukraine	Hard (i)	Ashleigh Barty	(Ukraine) Nadiia Kichenok (Ukraine) Olga Savchuk	W	6–2, 2–6, [10–8]
2017	PO2	22 April 2017	Zrenjanin, Serbia	Serbia	Hard (i)	Ashleigh Barty	(Serbia) Ivana Jorović (Serbia) Nina Stojanović	W	6–1, 7–5
2018	WG2	11 February 2018	Canberra, Australia	Ukraine	Grass (o)	Ashleigh Barty	(Ukraine) Lyudmyla Kichenok (Ukraine) Nadiia Kichenok	W	6–3, 6–4

== See also ==
- WTA Tour records
- Casey Dellacqua
- Australia Fed Cup team
