= 2001 ITF Women's Circuit =

Details

Achievements (singles)

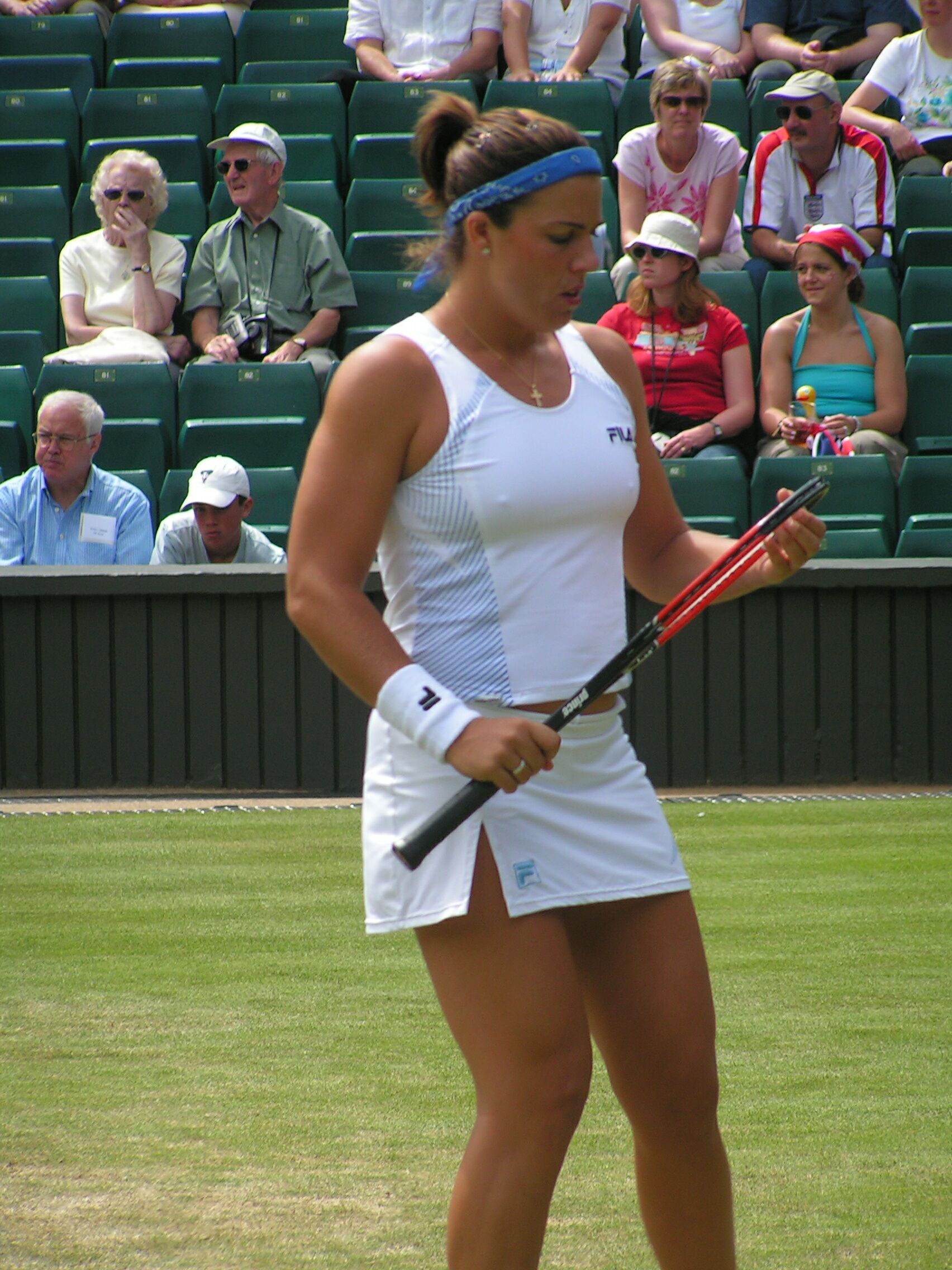
Jennifer Capriati the 2001 ITF world seniors champion.

The ITF Women's Circuit is the second-tier tour for women's professional tennis organised by the International Tennis Federation, and is the tier below the WTA Tour. In 2001, the ITF Women's circuit included tournaments with prize money ranging from $10,000 to $75,000. In addition to the traditional tournament format, there were also two four-week circuits (in Australia and Mexico) worth $40,000 each in prize money and two four-week development circuits (both held in India) each worth $20,000.

The ITF world champions for 2001 were Jennifer Capriati (senior singles), Lisa Raymond / Rennae Stubbs (senior doubles), Svetlana Kuznetsova (junior singles) and Petra Cetkovská (junior doubles).

== Schedule ==
=== Key ===
$100,000 tournaments
$75,000 tournaments
$40,000 and $50,000 tournaments
$20,000 and $25,000 tournaments
$10,000 tournaments

=== January ===
Week of	Tournament	Winner	Runners-up	Semifinalists	Quarterfinalists
January 1	São Paulo, Brazil $25,000 – Hard; Singles Draw – Doubles Draw	(Argentina) Clarisa Fernández; 6–3, 6–1	(Netherlands) Seda Noorlander	(Brazil) Bruna Colósio (Hungary) Adrienn Hegedűs	(Brazil) Vanessa Menga (Brazil) Miriam D'Agostini (Uruguay) Daniela Olivera (Argentina) Romina Ottoboni
January 1	São Paulo, Brazil $25,000 – Hard; Singles Draw – Doubles Draw	(Argentina) Clarisa Fernández (Argentina) Romina Ottoboni; 6–1, 7–6(6)	(Brazil) Vanessa Menga (Brazil) Miriam D'Agostini	(Brazil) Bruna Colósio (Hungary) Adrienn Hegedűs	(Brazil) Vanessa Menga (Brazil) Miriam D'Agostini (Uruguay) Daniela Olivera (Argentina) Romina Ottoboni
January 1	Tallahassee, Florida, United States $10,000 – Hard; Singles Draw – Doubles Draw	(United States) Jacqueline Trail; 6–4, 6–4	(South Korea) Jeon Mi-ra	(United States) Melissa Middleton (France) Camille Pin	(United States) Tory Zawacki (Romania) Edina Gallovits (Russia) Lioudmila Skavronskaia (South Korea) Jin-Hee Kim
January 1	Tallahassee, Florida, United States $10,000 – Hard; Singles Draw – Doubles Draw	(Netherlands) Mariëlle Hoogland (Netherlands) Anousjka van Exel; 7–6(6), 6–2	(Indonesia) Romana Tedjakusuma (India) Jyotsna Vasisht	(United States) Melissa Middleton (France) Camille Pin	(United States) Tory Zawacki (Romania) Edina Gallovits (Russia) Lioudmila Skavronskaia (South Korea) Jin-Hee Kim
January 8	No tournaments this week				
January 15	Boca Raton, Florida, United States $10,000 – Hard; Singles Draw – Doubles Draw	(Argentina) Gisela Dulko; 4–6, 7–5, 7–6(5)	(United States) Jolene Watanabe	(United States) Jacqueline Trail (United Kingdom) Rachel Viollet	(South Korea) Chae Kyung-yee (Indonesia) Romana Tedjakusuma (France) Camille Pin (United States) Karin Miller
January 15	Boca Raton, Florida, United States $10,000 – Hard; Singles Draw – Doubles Draw	(Russia) Evgenia Kulikovskaya (United States) Jolene Watanabe; 6–1, 6–0	(United States) Jacqueline Trail (United States) Melissa Middleton	(United States) Jacqueline Trail (United Kingdom) Rachel Viollet	(South Korea) Chae Kyung-yee (Indonesia) Romana Tedjakusuma (France) Camille Pin (United States) Karin Miller
January 22	Båstad, Sweden $10,000 – Hard; Singles Draw – Doubles Draw	(Germany) Martina Müller; 6–2, 6–0	(Estonia) Margit Rüütel	(Germany) Adriana Jerabek (Switzerland) Laura Bao	(Germany) Syna Schmidle (Germany) Karina Karner (Sweden) Jenny Lindstrom (Austria) Nina Egger
January 22	Båstad, Sweden $10,000 – Hard; Singles Draw – Doubles Draw	(Czech Republic) Blanka Kumbárová (Czech Republic) Helena Vildová; 6–1, 6–3	(Czech Republic) Lenka Cenková (Germany) Adriana Jerabek	(Germany) Adriana Jerabek (Switzerland) Laura Bao	(Germany) Syna Schmidle (Germany) Karina Karner (Sweden) Jenny Lindstrom (Austria) Nina Egger
January 22	Miami, United States $10,000 – Hard; Singles Draw – Doubles Draw	(Argentina) Gisela Dulko; 5–7, 6–3, 7–6(3)	(United States) Jane Chi	(Netherlands) Anousjka van Exel (Czech Republic) Hana Šromová	(Ukraine) Tatiana Kovalchuk (Czech Republic) Olga Blahotová (United States) Karin Miller (China) Sun Tiantian
January 22	Miami, United States $10,000 – Hard; Singles Draw – Doubles Draw	(Russia) Evgenia Kulikovskaya (United States) Jolene Watanabe; 6–2, 6–4	(United States) Jane Chi (Russia) Lioudmila Skavronskaia	(Netherlands) Anousjka van Exel (Czech Republic) Hana Šromová	(Ukraine) Tatiana Kovalchuk (Czech Republic) Olga Blahotová (United States) Karin Miller (China) Sun Tiantian
January 22	Jersey, Great Britain $10,000 – Hard; Singles Draw – Doubles Draw	(United Kingdom) Anne Keothavong; 6–3, 6–2	(France) Élodie Le Bescond	(United Kingdom) Annabel Blow (Russia) Oksana Karyshkova	(Greece) Evagelia Roussi (United Kingdom) Emily Webley-Smith (United Kingdom) Elena Baltacha (Croatia) Jelena Pandžić
January 22	Jersey, Great Britain $10,000 – Hard; Singles Draw – Doubles Draw	(United Kingdom) Nicola Payne (United Kingdom) Nicola Woodhouse; 4–6, 6–2, 6–2	(United States) Kirsty Blumberg (Japan) Ayami Takase	(United Kingdom) Annabel Blow (Russia) Oksana Karyshkova	(Greece) Evagelia Roussi (United Kingdom) Emily Webley-Smith (United Kingdom) Elena Baltacha (Croatia) Jelena Pandžić
January 29	Clearwater, Florida, United States $25,000 – Hard; Singles Draw – Doubles Draw	(Hungary) Anikó Kapros; 6–3, 6–2	(Russia) Alina Jidkova	(Indonesia) Romana Tedjakusuma (Ukraine) Tatiana Kovalchuk	(United States) Jacqueline Trail (France) Camille Pin (United States) Sandra Cacic (Czech Republic) Klára Koukalová
January 29	Clearwater, Florida, United States $25,000 – Hard; Singles Draw – Doubles Draw	(Brazil) Joana Cortez (Argentina) Clarisa Fernández; 6–1, 7–5	(Russia) Evgenia Kulikovskaya (United States) Jolene Watanabe	(Indonesia) Romana Tedjakusuma (Ukraine) Tatiana Kovalchuk	(United States) Jacqueline Trail (France) Camille Pin (United States) Sandra Cacic (Czech Republic) Klára Koukalová
January 29	Majorca, Spain $10,000 – Clay; Singles Draw – Doubles Draw	(Czech Republic) Veronika Raimrová; 6–1, 2–6, 6–2	(Spain) Ainhoa Goñi Blanco	(Hungary) Eszter Molnár (Czech Republic) Renata Voráčová	(Czech Republic) Jana Macurová (Russia) Dinara Safina (Spain) Rosa María Andrés Rodríguez (Slovakia) Katarína Bašternáková
January 29	Majorca, Spain $10,000 – Clay; Singles Draw – Doubles Draw	(Italy) Germana Di Natale (Romania) Andreea Vanc; 7–5, 3–6, 6–4	(Russia) Raissa Gourevitch (Russia) Dinara Safina	(Hungary) Eszter Molnár (Czech Republic) Renata Voráčová	(Czech Republic) Jana Macurová (Russia) Dinara Safina (Spain) Rosa María Andrés Rodríguez (Slovakia) Katarína Bašternáková
January 29	Tipton, Great Britain $10,000 – Hard; Singles Draw – Doubles Draw	(France) Anne-Laure Heitz; 6–4, 3–6, 7–6(2)	(Germany) Lydia Steinbach	(Germany) Magdalena Kučerová (United Kingdom) Hannah Collin	(Greece) Eleni Daniilidou (United Kingdom) Anne Keothavong (United Kingdom) Cristelle Grier (France) Élodie Le Bescond
January 29	Tipton, Great Britain $10,000 – Hard; Singles Draw – Doubles Draw	(United Kingdom) Helen Crook (United Kingdom) Victoria Davies; 2–6, 6–4, 6–4	(Greece) Eleni Daniilidou (Bulgaria) Maria Geznenge	(Germany) Magdalena Kučerová (United Kingdom) Hannah Collin	(Greece) Eleni Daniilidou (United Kingdom) Anne Keothavong (United Kingdom) Cristelle Grier (France) Élodie Le Bescond
January 29	Istanbul, Turkey $10,000 – Hard; Singles Draw – Doubles Draw	(Hungary) Melinda Czink; 5–7, 6–1, 6–2	(Czech Republic) Magdalena Zděnovcová	(Bulgaria) Radoslava Topalova (Romania) Raluca Ciochină	(Romania) Ioana Gașpar (Belarus) Olga Borisova (Russia) Goulnara Fattakhetdinova (Czech Republic) Lucie Šteflová
January 29	Istanbul, Turkey $10,000 – Hard; Singles Draw – Doubles Draw	(Turkey) Duygu Akşit Oal (Belarus) Elena Yaryshka; 3–6	(Russia) Maria Kondratieva (Russia) Svetlana Mossiakova	(Bulgaria) Radoslava Topalova (Romania) Raluca Ciochină	(Romania) Ioana Gașpar (Belarus) Olga Borisova (Russia) Goulnara Fattakhetdinova (Czech Republic) Lucie Šteflová
January 29	Wellington, New Zealand $10,000 – Hard; Singles Draw – Doubles Draw	(Chinese Taipei) Hsieh Su-wei; 6–2, 6–4	(New Zealand) Shelley Stephens	(New Zealand) Ilke Gers (New Zealand) Leanne Baker	(New Zealand) Nicola Kaiwai (Germany) Annette Kolb (Australia) Monique Adamczak (Australia) Sarah Stone
January 29	Wellington, New Zealand $10,000 – Hard; Singles Draw – Doubles Draw	(Australia) Donna McIntyre (New Zealand) Shelley Stephens; 7–5, 0–6, 6–2	(Chinese Taipei) Hsieh Su-wei (Germany) Annette Kolb	(New Zealand) Ilke Gers (New Zealand) Leanne Baker	(New Zealand) Nicola Kaiwai (Germany) Annette Kolb (Australia) Monique Adamczak (Australia) Sarah Stone

=== February ===
Week of	Tournament	Winner	Runners-up	Semifinalists	Quarterfinalists
February 5	Redbridge, Great Britain $25,000 – Hard; Singles Draw – Doubles Draw	(Denmark) Eva Dyrberg; 6–2, 6–2	(Luxembourg) Claudine Schaul	(Slovenia) Maja Matevžič (Kazakhstan) Irina Selyutina	(United Kingdom) Lorna Woodroffe (Russia) Maria Goloviznina (Germany) Magdalena Kučerová (United Kingdom) Julie Pullin
February 5	Redbridge, Great Britain $25,000 – Hard; Singles Draw – Doubles Draw	(United Kingdom) Julie Pullin (United Kingdom) Lorna Woodroffe; 6–1, 6–3	(Slovenia) Tina Križan (Kazakhstan) Irina Selyutina	(Slovenia) Maja Matevžič (Kazakhstan) Irina Selyutina	(United Kingdom) Lorna Woodroffe (Russia) Maria Goloviznina (Germany) Magdalena Kučerová (United Kingdom) Julie Pullin
February 5	Rockford, Illinois, United States $10,000 – Hard; Singles Draw – Doubles Draw	(United States) Jill Craybas; 6–4, 6–3	(Italy) Adriana Serra Zanetti	(Argentina) Clarisa Fernández (South Korea) Cho Yoon-jeong	(United States) Jane Chi (Ukraine) Elena Tatarkova (United States) Dawn Buth (Russia) Alina Jidkova
February 5	Rockford, Illinois, United States $10,000 – Hard; Singles Draw – Doubles Draw	(United States) Kristen Schlukebir (United States) Katie Schlukebir; 7–6(4), 6–1	(Bulgaria) Svetlana Krivencheva (Ukraine) Elena Tatarkova	(Argentina) Clarisa Fernández (South Korea) Cho Yoon-jeong	(United States) Jane Chi (Ukraine) Elena Tatarkova (United States) Dawn Buth (Russia) Alina Jidkova
February 5	Majorca, Spain $10,000 – Clay; Singles Draw – Doubles Draw	(Hungary) Eszter Molnár; 6–3, 6–4	(Slovakia) Katarína Bašternáková	(Spain) Maria-Rosa Sitja-Gibert (Spain) Rosa María Andrés Rodríguez	(Czech Republic) Renata Voráčová (Bulgaria) Elena Pampoulova (Austria) Daniela Klemenschits (Spain) Ainhoa Goñi Blanco
February 5	Majorca, Spain $10,000 – Clay; Singles Draw – Doubles Draw	(Spain) Rosa María Andrés Rodríguez (Russia) Dinara Safina; 6–3, 6–4	(Romania) Oana Elena Golimbioschi (Romania) Andreea Vanc	(Spain) Maria-Rosa Sitja-Gibert (Spain) Rosa María Andrés Rodríguez	(Czech Republic) Renata Voráčová (Bulgaria) Elena Pampoulova (Austria) Daniela Klemenschits (Spain) Ainhoa Goñi Blanco
February 12	Midland, Michigan, United States $75,000 – Hard; Singles Draw – Doubles Draw	(South Korea) Cho Yoon-jeong; 6–3, 6–1	(United States) Tara Snyder	(Czech Republic) Alena Vašková (Netherlands) Yvette Basting	(Czech Republic) Michaela Paštiková (Italy) Adriana Serra Zanetti (United States) Mashona Washington (United States) Marissa Irvin
February 12	Midland, Michigan, United States $75,000 – Hard; Singles Draw – Doubles Draw	(Netherlands) Yvette Basting (Ukraine) Elena Tatarkova; 3–6, 7–6(4), 6–4	(Slovenia) Jennifer Hopkins (Slovenia) Petra Rampre	(Czech Republic) Alena Vašková (Netherlands) Yvette Basting	(Czech Republic) Michaela Paštiková (Italy) Adriana Serra Zanetti (United States) Mashona Washington (United States) Marissa Irvin
February 12	Sutton, Great Britain $25,000 – Hard; Singles Draw – Doubles Draw	(Kazakhstan) Irina Selyutina; 6–3, 6–1	(Serbia and Montenegro) Dragana Zarić	(United Kingdom) Anne Keothavong (Netherlands) Amanda Hopmans	(Denmark) Eva Dyrberg (United Kingdom) Julie Pullin (United Kingdom) Lucie Ahl (Hungary) Adrienn Hegedűs
February 12	Sutton, Great Britain $25,000 – Hard; Singles Draw – Doubles Draw	(Greece) Eleni Daniilidou (Germany) Lydia Steinbach; 6–0, 6–4	(Netherlands) Amanda Hopmans (Belgium) Patty Van Acker	(United Kingdom) Anne Keothavong (Netherlands) Amanda Hopmans	(Denmark) Eva Dyrberg (United Kingdom) Julie Pullin (United Kingdom) Lucie Ahl (Hungary) Adrienn Hegedűs
February 12	India Development Circuit; India Development Circuit $20,000 – Hard; Singles Draw – Doubles Draw; Singles Draw – Doubles Draw; Singles Draw – Doubles Draw; Singles Draw – Doubles Draw	(India) Archana Venkataraman; 4–6, 6–2, 7–5	(India) Sonal Phadke	(India) Samrita Sekar (India) Radhika Tulpule	(India) Nandini Perumal (India) Tara Kanbargimath (Sweden) Nina Wennerström (India) Yamini Thukkaiandi
February 12	India Development Circuit; India Development Circuit $20,000 – Hard; Singles Draw – Doubles Draw; Singles Draw – Doubles Draw; Singles Draw – Doubles Draw; Singles Draw – Doubles Draw	(India) Rushmi Chakravarthi (India) Sai Jayalakshmy Jayaram; 6–1, 6–2	(India) Archana Venkataraman (India) Arthi Venkataraman	(India) Samrita Sekar (India) Radhika Tulpule	(India) Nandini Perumal (India) Tara Kanbargimath (Sweden) Nina Wennerström (India) Yamini Thukkaiandi
February 12	India Development Circuit; India Development Circuit $20,000 – Hard; Singles Draw – Doubles Draw; Singles Draw – Doubles Draw; Singles Draw – Doubles Draw; Singles Draw – Doubles Draw	(India) Radhika Mandke; 6–7(4), 6–4, 6–3	(India) Nandita Chandrasekar	(Sweden) Nina Wennerström (Australia) Jordanna Seymour	(India) Sonal Phadke (India) Liza Pereira (India) Sheethal Goutham (India) Chirashanthi Rajur
February 12	India Development Circuit; India Development Circuit $20,000 – Hard; Singles Draw – Doubles Draw; Singles Draw – Doubles Draw; Singles Draw – Doubles Draw; Singles Draw – Doubles Draw	(India) Sheethal Goutham (India) Liza Pereira; 7–6(3), 6–2	(India) Archana Venkataraman (India) Arthi Venkataraman	(Sweden) Nina Wennerström (Australia) Jordanna Seymour	(India) Sonal Phadke (India) Liza Pereira (India) Sheethal Goutham (India) Chirashanthi Rajur
February 12	India Development Circuit; India Development Circuit $20,000 – Hard; Singles Draw – Doubles Draw; Singles Draw – Doubles Draw; Singles Draw – Doubles Draw; Singles Draw – Doubles Draw	(India) Radhika Tulpule; 6–4, 7–6(5)	(India) Sonal Phadke	(India) Sheethal Goutham (Sweden) Nina Wennerström	(India) Radhika Mandke (India) Iciri Rai (India) Medhini Sharma (India) Liza Pereira
February 12	India Development Circuit; India Development Circuit $20,000 – Hard; Singles Draw – Doubles Draw; Singles Draw – Doubles Draw; Singles Draw – Doubles Draw; Singles Draw – Doubles Draw	(India) Sheethal Goutham (India) Liza Pereira; 6–3, 7–5	(India) Radhika Mandke (India) Sonal Phadke	(India) Sheethal Goutham (Sweden) Nina Wennerström	(India) Radhika Mandke (India) Iciri Rai (India) Medhini Sharma (India) Liza Pereira
February 12	India Development Circuit; India Development Circuit $20,000 – Hard; Singles Draw – Doubles Draw; Singles Draw – Doubles Draw; Singles Draw – Doubles Draw; Singles Draw – Doubles Draw	(India) Sheethal Goutham; 6–1, 6–2	(Sweden) Nina Wennerström	(India) Yamini Thukkaiandi (India) Sonal Phadke	(India) Lata Assudani (Australia) Jordanna Seymour (India) Radhika Tulpule (India) Arthi Venkataraman
February 12	India Development Circuit; India Development Circuit $20,000 – Hard; Singles Draw – Doubles Draw; Singles Draw – Doubles Draw; Singles Draw – Doubles Draw; Singles Draw – Doubles Draw	(India) Yamini Thukkaiandi (India) Arthi Venkataraman; 6–2, 6–4	(India) Sheethal Goutham (India) Liza Pereira	(India) Yamini Thukkaiandi (India) Sonal Phadke	(India) Lata Assudani (Australia) Jordanna Seymour (India) Radhika Tulpule (India) Arthi Venkataraman
February 12	Faro, Portugal $10,000 – Hard; Singles Draw – Doubles Draw	(Japan) Miho Saeki; 6–3, 6–1	(Italy) Alberta Brianti	(Argentina) Eugenia Chialvo (Czech Republic) Olga Blahotová	(Czech Republic) Gabriela Navrátilová (Spain) Carolina Rofriguez-Magdalena (Morocco) Lamia Essaadi (Austria) Sandra Klemenschits
February 12	Faro, Portugal $10,000 – Hard; Singles Draw – Doubles Draw	(Czech Republic) Olga Blahotová (Czech Republic) Gabriela Navrátilová; 6–0, 6–2	(Austria) Sandra Klemenschits (Austria) Daniela Klemenschits	(Argentina) Eugenia Chialvo (Czech Republic) Olga Blahotová	(Czech Republic) Gabriela Navrátilová (Spain) Carolina Rofriguez-Magdalena (Morocco) Lamia Essaadi (Austria) Sandra Klemenschits
February 19	Vale do Lobo, Portugal $10,000 – Hard; Singles Draw – Doubles Draw	(Russia) Ekaterina Kozhokina; 6–4, 4–6, 6–3	(United Kingdom) Julie Pullin	(Sweden) Kristina Triska (Japan) Miho Saeki	(Czech Republic) Gabriela Navrátilová (France) Edith Nunes-Bersot (Czech Republic) Gabriela Navrátilová (Belgium) Leslie Butkiewicz
February 19	Vale do Lobo, Portugal $10,000 – Hard; Singles Draw – Doubles Draw	(France) Carine Bornu (Switzerland) Aliénor Tricerri; 6–3, 6–3	(United Kingdom) Alice Barnes (United Kingdom) Julie Pullin	(Sweden) Kristina Triska (Japan) Miho Saeki	(Czech Republic) Gabriela Navrátilová (France) Edith Nunes-Bersot (Czech Republic) Gabriela Navrátilová (Belgium) Leslie Butkiewicz
February 26	Minneapolis, United States $50,000 – Hard; Singles Draw – Doubles Draw	(United States) Dawn Buth; 4–6, 7–5, 6–4	(Netherlands) Yvette Basting	(Netherlands) Amanda Hopmans (Belgium) Laurence Courtois	(Ukraine) Tatiana Perebiynis (United States) Jane Chi (Czech Republic) Michaela Paštiková (Czech Republic) Lenka Němečková
February 26	Minneapolis, United States $50,000 – Hard; Singles Draw – Doubles Draw	(Netherlands) Yvette Basting (Ukraine) Elena Tatarkova; 7–5, 7–6(0)	(Belgium) Laurence Courtois (Australia) Alicia Molik	(Netherlands) Amanda Hopmans (Belgium) Laurence Courtois	(Ukraine) Tatiana Perebiynis (United States) Jane Chi (Czech Republic) Michaela Paštiková (Czech Republic) Lenka Němečková
February 26	Bendigo, Australia $25,000 – Clay; Singles Draw – Doubles Draw	(Australia) Annabel Ellwood; 3–6, 6–2, 6–4	(Australia) Christina Wheeler	(Australia) Mireille Dittmann (Australia) Michelle Summerside	(Germany) Annette Kolb (Australia) Melissa Dowse (New Zealand) Shelley Stephens (Hong Kong) Tong Ka-po
February 26	Bendigo, Australia $25,000 – Clay; Singles Draw – Doubles Draw	(New Zealand) Shelley Stephens (New Zealand) Leanne Baker; 6–3, 6–2	(Netherlands) Debby Haak (Netherlands) Jolanda Mens	(Australia) Mireille Dittmann (Australia) Michelle Summerside	(Germany) Annette Kolb (Australia) Melissa Dowse (New Zealand) Shelley Stephens (Hong Kong) Tong Ka-po

=== March ===
Week of	Tournament	Winner	Runners-up	Semifinalists	Quarterfinalists
March 5	Australia Circuit $40,000 – Grass; Singles Draw – Doubles Draw; Singles Draw – Doubles Draw; Singles Draw – Doubles Draw; Singles Draw – Doubles Draw	(Japan) Miho Saeki; 3–6, 6–1, 6–2	(Australia) Kristen van Elden	(New Zealand) Leanne Baker (Australia) Rochelle Rosenfield	(India) Manisha Malhotra (United States) Annica Cooper (Romania) Diana Gherghi (New Zealand) Shelley Stephens
March 5	Australia Circuit $40,000 – Grass; Singles Draw – Doubles Draw; Singles Draw – Doubles Draw; Singles Draw – Doubles Draw; Singles Draw – Doubles Draw	(Netherlands) Debby Haak (Netherlands) Jolanda Mens; 6–4, 6–3	(Australia) Beti Sekulovski (Australia) Nicole Sewell	(New Zealand) Leanne Baker (Australia) Rochelle Rosenfield	(India) Manisha Malhotra (United States) Annica Cooper (Romania) Diana Gherghi (New Zealand) Shelley Stephens
March 5	Australia Circuit $40,000 – Grass; Singles Draw – Doubles Draw; Singles Draw – Doubles Draw; Singles Draw – Doubles Draw; Singles Draw – Doubles Draw	(Australia) Beti Sekulovski; 6–2, 6–2	(Australia) Kristen van Elden	(India) Manisha Malhotra (Australia) Emily Hewson	(New Zealand) Shelley Stephens (Japan) Remi Uda (India) Rushmi Chakravarthi (New Zealand) Leanne Baker
March 5	Australia Circuit $40,000 – Grass; Singles Draw – Doubles Draw; Singles Draw – Doubles Draw; Singles Draw – Doubles Draw; Singles Draw – Doubles Draw	(Australia) Sarah Stone (Australia) Kristen van Elden; 3–6, 7–6(4), 6–4	(Australia) Beti Sekulovski (Australia) Nicole Sewell	(India) Manisha Malhotra (Australia) Emily Hewson	(New Zealand) Shelley Stephens (Japan) Remi Uda (India) Rushmi Chakravarthi (New Zealand) Leanne Baker
March 5	Australia Circuit $40,000 – Grass; Singles Draw – Doubles Draw; Singles Draw – Doubles Draw; Singles Draw – Doubles Draw; Singles Draw – Doubles Draw	(Japan) Miho Saeki; 6–1, 6–2	(Australia) Kristen van Elden	(New Zealand) Leanne Baker (New Zealand) Shelley Stephens	(Australia) Nicole Sewell (Australia) Beti Sekulovski (India) Manisha Malhotra (Australia) Monique Adamczak
March 5	Australia Circuit $40,000 – Grass; Singles Draw – Doubles Draw; Singles Draw – Doubles Draw; Singles Draw – Doubles Draw; Singles Draw – Doubles Draw	(Australia) Monique Adamczak (Australia) Samantha Stosur; 6–3, 7–5	(Netherlands) Debby Haak (Australia) Jolanda Mens	(New Zealand) Leanne Baker (New Zealand) Shelley Stephens	(Australia) Nicole Sewell (Australia) Beti Sekulovski (India) Manisha Malhotra (Australia) Monique Adamczak
March 5	Australia Circuit $40,000 – Grass; Singles Draw – Doubles Draw; Singles Draw – Doubles Draw; Singles Draw – Doubles Draw; Singles Draw – Doubles Draw	(Japan) Miho Saeki; 6–4, 6–4	(Australia) Samantha Stosur	(Thailand) Suchanun Viratprasert (Australia) Nicole Sewell	(Australia) Kristen van Elden (Australia) Monique Adamczak (India) Manisha Malhotra (South Africa) Giselle Swart
March 5	Australia Circuit $40,000 – Grass; Singles Draw – Doubles Draw; Singles Draw – Doubles Draw; Singles Draw – Doubles Draw; Singles Draw – Doubles Draw	(Romania) Simona Arghire (Japan) Remi Uda; 6–3, 6–3	(Australia) Nadia Johnston (India) Manisha Malhotra	(Thailand) Suchanun Viratprasert (Australia) Nicole Sewell	(Australia) Kristen van Elden (Australia) Monique Adamczak (India) Manisha Malhotra (South Africa) Giselle Swart
March 5	Mexico Circuit $40,000 – Hard; Singles Draw – Doubles Draw; Singles Draw – Doubles Draw; Singles Draw – Doubles Draw; Singles Draw – Doubles Draw	(Austria) Petra Russegger; 6–0, 6–3	(Netherlands) Anousjka van Exel	(Argentina) Melisa Arévalo (United States) Alyssa Cohen	(Uruguay) Daniela Olivera (Portugal) Ana Catarina Nogueira (United States) Melissa Middleton (Mexico) Erika Valdés
March 5	Mexico Circuit $40,000 – Hard; Singles Draw – Doubles Draw; Singles Draw – Doubles Draw; Singles Draw – Doubles Draw; Singles Draw – Doubles Draw	(Argentina) Luciana Masante (Uruguay) Daniela Olivera; 6–4, 7–5	(Argentina) Melisa Arévalo (Spain) Conchita Martínez Granados	(Argentina) Melisa Arévalo (United States) Alyssa Cohen	(Uruguay) Daniela Olivera (Portugal) Ana Catarina Nogueira (United States) Melissa Middleton (Mexico) Erika Valdés
March 5	Mexico Circuit $40,000 – Hard; Singles Draw – Doubles Draw; Singles Draw – Doubles Draw; Singles Draw – Doubles Draw; Singles Draw – Doubles Draw	(Austria) Petra Russegger; 4–6, 6–1, 7–5	(Spain) Conchita Martínez Granados	(Uruguay) Daniela Olivera (Austria) Bianca Kamper	(Argentina) Melisa Arévalo (Russia) Anna Nefedova (Germany) Ines Heise (Argentina) Luciana Masante
March 5	Mexico Circuit $40,000 – Hard; Singles Draw – Doubles Draw; Singles Draw – Doubles Draw; Singles Draw – Doubles Draw; Singles Draw – Doubles Draw	(Argentina) Luciana Masante (Uruguay) Daniela Olivera; 6–2, 6–2	(Austria) Bianca Kamper (Austria) Nadine Schlotterer	(Uruguay) Daniela Olivera (Austria) Bianca Kamper	(Argentina) Melisa Arévalo (Russia) Anna Nefedova (Germany) Ines Heise (Argentina) Luciana Masante
March 5	Mexico Circuit $40,000 – Hard; Singles Draw – Doubles Draw; Singles Draw – Doubles Draw; Singles Draw – Doubles Draw; Singles Draw – Doubles Draw	(Austria) Petra Russegger; 2–6, 6–4, 6–2	(Uruguay) Daniela Olivera	(Spain) Conchita Martínez Granados (Serbia and Montenegro) Marina Petrovic	(Austria) Nadine Schlotterer (Mexico) Erika Valdés (Argentina) Melisa Arévalo (United States) Alyssa Cohen
March 5	Mexico Circuit $40,000 – Hard; Singles Draw – Doubles Draw; Singles Draw – Doubles Draw; Singles Draw – Doubles Draw; Singles Draw – Doubles Draw	(United States) Elizabeth Schmidt (Netherlands) Anousjka van Exel; 0–6, 6–2, 6–4	(Austria) Bianca Kamper (Austria) Isabella Mitterlehner	(Spain) Conchita Martínez Granados (Serbia and Montenegro) Marina Petrovic	(Austria) Nadine Schlotterer (Mexico) Erika Valdés (Argentina) Melisa Arévalo (United States) Alyssa Cohen
March 5	Mexico Circuit $40,000 – Hard; Singles Draw – Doubles Draw; Singles Draw – Doubles Draw; Singles Draw – Doubles Draw; Singles Draw – Doubles Draw	(Spain) Conchita Martínez Granados; 2–6, 6–4, 6–1	(Uruguay) Daniela Olivera	(United Kingdom) Helen Crook (Russia) Anna Nefedova	(Austria) Petra Russegger (Austria) Nadine Schlotterer (Serbia and Montenegro) Marina Petrovic (United States) Melissa Middleton
March 5	Mexico Circuit $40,000 – Hard; Singles Draw – Doubles Draw; Singles Draw – Doubles Draw; Singles Draw – Doubles Draw; Singles Draw – Doubles Draw	(Argentina) Melisa Arévalo (Spain) Conchita Martínez Granados; 7–6(3), 0–6, 6–1	(United States) Courtenay Chapmen (United States) Melissa Middleton	(United Kingdom) Helen Crook (Russia) Anna Nefedova	(Austria) Petra Russegger (Austria) Nadine Schlotterer (Serbia and Montenegro) Marina Petrovic (United States) Melissa Middleton
March 5	Ortisei, Italy $25,000 – Hard; Singles Draw – Doubles Draw	(Slovenia) Maja Matevžič; 6–7(3), 6–3, 6–3	(Russia) Ekaterina Kozhokina	(Italy) Flavia Pennetta (Italy) Maria Paola Zavagli	(Austria) Evelyn Fauth (Bulgaria) Antoaneta Pandjerova (Denmark) Eva Dyrberg (Czech Republic) Zuzana Ondrášková
March 5	Ortisei, Italy $25,000 – Hard; Singles Draw – Doubles Draw	(Germany) Angelika Bachmann (Denmark) Eva Dyrberg; 3–6, 6–4, 6–2	(Russia) Ekaterina Kozhokina (Republic of Ireland) Kelly Liggan	(Italy) Flavia Pennetta (Italy) Maria Paola Zavagli	(Austria) Evelyn Fauth (Bulgaria) Antoaneta Pandjerova (Denmark) Eva Dyrberg (Czech Republic) Zuzana Ondrášková
March 5	Hangzhou, China $25,000 – Hard; Singles Draw – Doubles Draw	(China) Liu Nannan; 7–6(2), 3–6, 7–5	(Japan) Rika Fujiwara	(South Korea) Choi Young-ja (China) Zheng Jie	(China) Yan Zi (Czech Republic) Renata Voráčová (Japan) Akiko Morigami (Czech Republic) Milena Nekvapilová
March 5	Hangzhou, China $25,000 – Hard; Singles Draw – Doubles Draw	(China) Li Na (China) Lui-Li Shen; 6–3, 6–3	(Slovakia) Lenka Dlhopolcová (Japan) Remi Tezuka	(South Korea) Choi Young-ja (China) Zheng Jie	(China) Yan Zi (Czech Republic) Renata Voráčová (Japan) Akiko Morigami (Czech Republic) Milena Nekvapilová
March 5	Buchen, Germany $10,000 – Carpet; Singles Draw – Doubles Draw	(Netherlands) Mariëlle Hoogland; 6–3, 6–2	(Germany) Stefanie Weis	(Germany) Stephanie Gehrlein (Czech Republic) Lenka Novotná	(Austria) Sandra Klemenschits (Belgium) Patty Van Acker (Finland) Petra Puheloinen (Germany) Bianca Cremer
March 5	Buchen, Germany $10,000 – Carpet; Singles Draw – Doubles Draw	(Austria) Sandra Klemenschits (Austria) Daniela Klemenschits; 7–6(5), 7–6(8)	(Hungary) Adrienn Hegedűs (Hungary) Eszter Molnár	(Germany) Stephanie Gehrlein (Czech Republic) Lenka Novotná	(Austria) Sandra Klemenschits (Belgium) Patty Van Acker (Finland) Petra Puheloinen (Germany) Bianca Cremer
12 March	Kaohsiung, Taiwan; Hard $10; Singles and doubles draws	(Chinese Taipei) Hsieh Su-wei; 6–4, 3–6, 6–3	(Chinese Taipei) Chuang Chia-jung	(Indonesia) Angelique Widjaja (Sweden) Diana Majkić	(South Korea) Yoo Seon-ja (South Korea) Choi Jin-young (Japan) Ayami Takase (Chinese Taipei) Weng Tzu-ting
12 March	Kaohsiung, Taiwan; Hard $10; Singles and doubles draws	(Indonesia) Dea Sumantri (Indonesia) Angelique Widjaja; 6–3, 6–2	(South Korea) Chae Kyung-yee (South Korea) Kim Jin-hee	(Indonesia) Angelique Widjaja (Sweden) Diana Majkić	(South Korea) Yoo Seon-ja (South Korea) Choi Jin-young (Japan) Ayami Takase (Chinese Taipei) Weng Tzu-ting
19 March	La Cañada, United States; Hard $25,000; Singles and doubles draws	(Australia) Cindy Watson; 6–1, 6–3	(France) Camille Pin	(United States) Tracy Almeda-Singian (United Kingdom) Julie Pullin	(United Kingdom) Rachel Viollet (Austria) Marion Maruska (South Korea) Kim Eun-ha (Canada) Marie-Ève Pelletier
19 March	La Cañada, United States; Hard $25,000; Singles and doubles draws	(United Kingdom) Julie Pullin (United Kingdom) Lorna Woodroffe; 6–2, 6–4	(Japan) Rika Hiraki (South Korea) Kim Eun-ha	(United States) Tracy Almeda-Singian (United Kingdom) Julie Pullin	(United Kingdom) Rachel Viollet (Austria) Marion Maruska (South Korea) Kim Eun-ha (Canada) Marie-Ève Pelletier
19 March	Rome, Italy; Clay $10,000; Singles and doubles draws	(Russia) Dinara Safina; 7–5, 6–0	(Bulgaria) Maria Geznenge	(Italy) Gloria Pizzichini (Spain) Paula García	(Slovakia) Eva Fislová (Romania) Oana Elena Golimbioschi (Italy) Alberta Brianti (Italy) Elisa Villa
19 March	Rome, Italy; Clay $10,000; Singles and doubles draws	(Slovakia) Zuzana Kučová (Czech Republic) Iveta Benešová; 4–6, 6–4, 6–4	(Italy) Claudia Ivone (Italy) Roberta Vinci	(Italy) Gloria Pizzichini (Spain) Paula García	(Slovakia) Eva Fislová (Romania) Oana Elena Golimbioschi (Italy) Alberta Brianti (Italy) Elisa Villa
19 March	Cholet, France; Clay (i) $10,000; Singles and doubles draws	(Germany) Vanessa Henke; 6–7^{(1)}, 6–3, 6–3	(France) Sophie Erre	(Italy) Nathalie Viérin (Socialist Federal Republic of Yugoslavia) Katarina Mišić	(France) Élodie Le Bescond (Belgium) Patty Van Acker (Russia) Anastasia Rodionova (Italy) Germana Di Natale
19 March	Cholet, France; Clay (i) $10,000; Singles and doubles draws	(Ukraine) Yuliya Beygelzimer (Russia) Anastasia Rodionova; 6–1, 7–6^{(5)}	(Greece) Eleni Daniilidou (Italy) Germana Di Natale	(Italy) Nathalie Viérin (Socialist Federal Republic of Yugoslavia) Katarina Mišić	(France) Élodie Le Bescond (Belgium) Patty Van Acker (Russia) Anastasia Rodionova (Italy) Germana Di Natale
26 March	Stone Mountain, United States; Hard $25,000; Singles and doubles draws	(Austria) Marion Maruska; 6–3, 6–3	(Australia) Alicia Molik	(France) Camille Pin (United States) Samantha Reeves	(Australia) Evie Dominikovic (United States) Marissa Irvin (Canada) Marie-Ève Pelletier (United States) Tracy Almeda-Singian
26 March	Stone Mountain, United States; Hard $25,000; Singles and doubles draws	(Japan) Rika Fujiwara (South Korea) Jeon Mi-ra; 7–5, 6–3	(Australia) Alicia Molik (Australia) Bryanne Stewart	(France) Camille Pin (United States) Samantha Reeves	(Australia) Evie Dominikovic (United States) Marissa Irvin (Canada) Marie-Ève Pelletier (United States) Tracy Almeda-Singian
26 March	Bari, Italy; Clay $10,000; Singles and doubles draws	(Estonia) Margit Rüütel; 3–6, 6–3, 6–1	(Slovakia) Eva Fislová	(Romania) Magda Mihalache (Bulgaria) Maria Geznenge	(Croatia) Lana Popadić (Romania) Andreea Ehritt-Vanc (Socialist Federal Republic of Yugoslavia) Ana Timotić (Italy) Claudia Ivone
26 March	Bari, Italy; Clay $10,000; Singles and doubles draws	(Germany) Julia Schruff (Germany) Rita Tarjan; 3–6, 7–5, 6–4	(Slovakia) Eva Fislová (Czech Republic) Zuzana Hejdová	(Romania) Magda Mihalache (Bulgaria) Maria Geznenge	(Croatia) Lana Popadić (Romania) Andreea Ehritt-Vanc (Socialist Federal Republic of Yugoslavia) Ana Timotić (Italy) Claudia Ivone
26 March	Amiens, France; Clay (i) $10,000; Singles and doubles draws	(France) Sophie Erre; 6–7^{(3)}, 6–3, 7–6^{(6)}	(Croatia) Jelena Pandžić	(Spain) Maria-Rosa Sitja-Gibert (France) Stéphanie Rizzi	(France) Julie Coin (Belgium) Leslie Butkiewicz (Germany) Magdalena Kučerová (France) Elsa Morel
26 March	Amiens, France; Clay (i) $10,000; Singles and doubles draws	(France) Olivia Cappelletti (France) Julie Coin; 7–5, 6–1	(Germany) Bianca Cremer (Croatia) Jelena Pandžić	(Spain) Maria-Rosa Sitja-Gibert (France) Stéphanie Rizzi	(France) Julie Coin (Belgium) Leslie Butkiewicz (Germany) Magdalena Kučerová (France) Elsa Morel
26 March	Santiago, Chile; Clay $10,000; Singles and doubles draws	(Brazil) Joana Cortez; 6–3, 6–3	(Argentina) Vanina García Sokol	(Argentina) Romina Ottoboni (Brazil) Carla Tiene	(Paraguay) Larissa Schaerer (Uruguay) Ana Lucía Migliarini de León (Argentina) Sabrina Eisenberg (Ecuador) Mariana Correa
26 March	Santiago, Chile; Clay $10,000; Singles and doubles draws	(Argentina) Celeste Contín (Argentina) Romina Ottoboni; 6–1, 6–3	(Brazil) Marcela Evangelista (Brazil) Letícia Sobral	(Argentina) Romina Ottoboni (Brazil) Carla Tiene	(Paraguay) Larissa Schaerer (Uruguay) Ana Lucía Migliarini de León (Argentina) Sabrina Eisenberg (Ecuador) Mariana Correa

=== April ===
Week of	Tournament	Winner	Runners-up
2 April	West Palm Beach, United States; Clay $75,000; Singles and doubles draws	(Slovakia) Henrieta Nagyová; 3–6, 6–3, 6–1	(Sweden) Åsa Svensson
2 April	West Palm Beach, United States; Clay $75,000; Singles and doubles draws	(Australia) Rachel McQuillan (Australia) Lisa McShea; 6–3, 6–3	(Japan) Rika Hiraki (Japan) Nana Smith
2 April	Dubai, United Arab Emirates; Hard $75,000; Singles and doubles draws	(Greece) Eleni Daniilidou; 6–4, 6–4	(Hungary) Anikó Kapros
2 April	Dubai, United Arab Emirates; Hard $75,000; Singles and doubles draws	(Belgium) Laurence Courtois (Netherlands) Seda Noorlander; 6–3, 6–0	(France) Caroline Dhenin (Hungary) Katalin Marosi
2 April	Juárez, Mexico; Clay $25,000; Singles and doubles draws	(Italy) Nathalie Viérin; 6–3, 2–6, 6–3	(Denmark) Eva Dyrberg
2 April	Juárez, Mexico; Clay $25,000; Singles and doubles draws	(Spain) Alicia Ortuño (Venezuela) Milagros Sequera; 6–4, 2–6, 6–2	(Argentina) Erica Krauth (Argentina) Vanesa Krauth
2 April	Makarska, Croatia; Clay $10,000; Singles and doubles draws	(Russia) Gulnara Fattakhetdinova; 6–3, 4–6, 6–2	(Hungary) Barbara Orlay
2 April	Makarska, Croatia; Clay $10,000; Singles and doubles draws	(Czech Republic) Petra Raclavská (Czech Republic) Gabriela Chmelinová; 1–6, 6–2, 6–3	(Czech Republic) Zuzana Hejdová (Bosnia and Herzegovina) Mervana Jugić-Salkić
2 April	Athens, Greece; Clay $10,000; Singles and doubles draws	(Socialist Federal Republic of Yugoslavia) Ana Timotić; 7–5, 6–3	(Belarus) Elena Yaryshka
2 April	Athens, Greece; Clay $10,000; Singles and doubles draws	(Austria) Daniela Klemenschits (Austria) Sandra Klemenschits; 6–3, 7–5	(Croatia) Marijana Kovačević (Bulgaria) Biljana Pawlowa-Dimitrova

== Tournament breakdown by region ==
Region	Number of events	Total prize money
Africa	9	$105,000
Asia	44	$700,000
Europe	154	$2,780,000
North America*	62	$1,605,000
Oceania	12	$225,000
South America	15	$195,000
Total	296	$5,610,000

- Including Central America and the Caribbean

== Singles titles by nation ==
Rank	Nation	Titles won
1.	Czech Republic	24
2.	France	18
3.	Germany	16
3.	United States	16
5.	Japan	15
6.	Argentina	14
=	Russia	14
8.	Australia	13
=	Spain	13
=	Italy	13
11.	India	12
12.	Austria	9
=	China	9
=	Hungary	9
=	Chinese Taipei	9
16.	Kazakhstan	7
=	Netherlands	7
18.	Brazil	5
=	Korea	5
=	Slovakia	5

This list displays only the top 20 nations in singles titles wins.
