= Nicola Payne =

Nicola Payne may refer to:

- Nicola Payne, List of unsolved murders in the United Kingdom, went missing 1991
- Nicola Payne (rower) (born 1966), New Zealand rower
- Nicola Payne (cricketer) (born 1969), international cricketer for the Netherlands and New Zealand
- Nicola Payne (tennis), British tennis player in 1999 Wimbledon Championships – Women's Singles Qualifying and 2001 ITF Women's Circuit
