= Aleksandra Srndovic =

Swedish tennis player

- Country (sports): Sweden
- Born: 18 November 1982 (age 42)
- Prize money: $56,080

Singles
- Highest ranking: No. 323 (17 July 2006)

Doubles
- Highest ranking: No. 309 (24 October 2005)

Aleksandra Srndovic (born 18 November 1982) is a Swedish former professional tennis player.

Srndovic twice featured in the doubles main draw of the Nordic Light Open, in 2007 and 2008, both partnering Debbrich Feys. She has been a squad member of the Sweden Fed Cup team.

== ITF finals ==
$25,000 tournaments
$10,000 tournaments

=== Singles: 3 (2–1) ===
| Result | No. | Date | Tournament | Surface | Opponent | Score |
|---|---|---|---|---|---|---|
| Win | 1. | 15 September 2003 | Chieti, Italy | Clay | (Poland) Klaudia Jans-Ignacik | 7–5, 6–1 |
| Loss | 1. | 13 October 2003 | Castel Gandolfo, Italy | Clay | (Austria) Betina Pirker | 6–3, 4–6, 1–6 |
| Loss | 2. | 28 June 2004 | Heerhugowaard, Netherlands | Clay | (Bosnia and Herzegovina) Sandra Martinović | 2–6, 1–6 |

=== Doubles: 13 (6–7) ===
| Result | No. | Date | Tournament | Surface | Partner | Opponents | Score |
|---|---|---|---|---|---|---|---|
| Win | 1. | 13 September 1998 | Póvoa de Varzim, Portugal | Hard | (Spain) Marta Marrero | (Portugal) Ana Gaspar (Portugal) Frederica Piedade | 6–1, 6–0 |
| Loss | 1. | 22 April 2001 | Cagliari, Italy | Clay | (Russia) Vera Zvonareva | (Italy) Giulia Meruzzi (Romania) Andreea Ehritt-Vanc | 1–6, 3–6 |
| Win | 2. | 13 August 2001 | Koksijde, Belgium | Clay | (Czech Republic) Lenka Snajdrová | (Croatia) Jelena Pandžić (North Macedonia) Marina Lazarovska | 6–2, 6–4 |
| Win | 3. | 21 January 2002 | Båstad, Sweden | Hard | (Hungary) Eszter Molnár | (Romania) Liana Ungur (Greece) Christina Zachariadou | 2–6, 6–2, 7–5 |
| Win | 4. | 31 March 2003 | Istanbul, Turkey | Hard | (Belarus) Elena Yaryshka | (Sweden) Anna Erikson (Sweden) Jenny Lindström | 4–6, 6–4, 6–2 |
| Win | 5. | 13 October 2003 | Castel Gandolfo, Italy | Clay | (Austria) Betina Pirker | (Czech Republic) Sandra Záhlavová (Italy) Valentina Sulpizio | 6–3, 4–6, 7–6 |
| Win | 6. | 4 July 2004 | Heerhugowaard, Netherlands | Clay | (Australia) Kristen van Elden | (Netherlands) Daniëlle Harmsen (Netherlands) Susanne Trik | 6–1, 6–2 |
| Loss | 2. | 25 July 2004 | Ancona, Italy | Clay | (Croatia) Nadja Pavic | (Romania) Oana Elena Golimbioschi (France) Aurélie Védy | 3–6, 3–6 |
| Loss | 3. | 5 February 2005 | Wellington, New Zealand | Hard | (Australia) Beti Sekulovski | (South Korea) Chang Kyung-mi (Japan) Maki Arai | 6–3, 4–6, 4–6 |
| Loss | 4. | 13 February 2005 | Blenheim, New Zealand | Hard | (Australia) Beti Sekulovski | (South Korea) Chang Kyung-mi (Japan) Maki Arai | 4–6, 6–7 |
| Loss | 5. | 30 August 2005 | Alphen aan den Rijn, Netherlands | Clay | (Czech Republic) Veronika Raimrová | (Netherlands) Mireille Bink (Netherlands) Susanne Trik | 2–6, 6–3, 2–6 |
| Loss | 6. | 27 September 2005 | Rockhampton, Australia | Hard | (Australia) Beti Sekulovski | (Australia) Casey Dellacqua (Australia) Daniella Jeflea | 4–6, 2–6 |
| Loss | 7. | 10 July 2006 | Brussels, Belgium | Clay | (Brazil) Joana Cortez | (Czech Republic) Iveta Gerlová (Germany) Carmen Klaschka | 3–6, 2–6 |
