= Andrea van den Hurk =

Dutch tennis player

- Country (sports): Netherlands
- Born: 2 February 1979 (age 46); Haarlem, Netherlands
- Retired: 2004
- Plays: Right-handed
- Prize money: $45,581

Singles
- Career record: 118–122
- Career titles: 0
- Highest ranking: No. 347 (27 September 1999)

Doubles
- Career record: 128–87
- Career titles: 13 ITF
- Highest ranking: No. 146 (17 July 2000)

Andrea van den Hurk (born 2 February 1979) is a former tennis player from the Netherlands.

A right-handed player from Haarlem, Van den Hurk competed on the professional tour from 1996 to 2004.

She was most successful as a doubles player, with 13 ITF titles and a best ranking of 146 in the world, which she reached in 2000. On the WTA Tour, she featured in the main draw of five doubles tournaments, three of which came in 2000 partnering Debby Haak.

== ITF finals ==
Legend
$25,000 tournaments
$10,000 tournaments

=== Singles (0–2) ===
Outcome	No.	Date	Location	Surface	Opponent	Score
Runner-up	1.	28 June 1998	Velp, Netherlands	Hard	(Netherlands) Yvette Basting	1–6, 7–5, 2–6
Runner-up	2.	16 October 2000	Gwalior, India	Clay	(India) Sai Jayalakshmy Jayaram	1–4, 0–4

=== Doubles (13–10) ===
Outcome	No.	Date	Location	Surface	Partner	Opponents	Score
Winner	1.	17 November 1996	Cairo, Egypt	Hard	(Netherlands) Maaike Koutstaal	(Slovenia) Katarina Srebotnik (South Africa) Jessica Steck	w/o
Winner	2.	3 March 1997	Tel Aviv, Israel	Hard	(Netherlands) Henriëtte van Aalderen	(Czech Republic) Milena Nekvapilová (Czech Republic) Hana Šromová	0–6, 6–3, 6–4
Runner-up	3.	14 February 1998	Birmingham, Great Britain	Hard (i)	(Netherlands) Henriëtte van Aalderen	(Germany) Kirstin Freye (United States) Jean Okada	4–6, 4–6
Winner	4.	28 June 1998	Velp, Netherlands	Clay	(Netherlands) Claudia Reimering	(Netherlands) Jolanda Mens (Netherlands) Kim Kilsdonk	6–4, 6–4
Runner-up	5.	5 July 1998	Alkmaar, Netherlands	Clay	(Netherlands) Carlijin Buis	(Netherlands) Yvette Basting (Netherlands) Henriëtte van Aalderen	0–6, 1–6
Runner-up	6.	7 November 1998	Moulins, France	Hard (i)	(Netherlands) Debby Haak	(Switzerland) Diane Asensio (Uzbekistan) Iroda Tulyaganova	5–7, 6–2, 2–6
Winner	7.	15 March 1999	Petroupoli, Greece	Clay	(Netherlands) Jolanda Mens	(Hungary) Adrienn Hegedűs (Germany) Vanessa Henke	6–4, 6–3
Runner-up	8.	13 June 1999	Biel, Switzerland	Clay	(Netherlands) Debby Haak	(Australia) Mireille Dittmann (Australia) Natalie Dittmann	5–7, 6–1, 1–6
Winner	9.	25 July 1999	Valladolid, Spain	Hard	(Netherlands) Debby Haak	(Czech Republic) Lenka Cenková (Germany) Meike Fröhlich	2–6, 6–3, 7–6
Runner-up	10.	1 August 1999	Les Contamines, France	Hard	(Colombia) Giana Gutiérrez	(France) Caroline Dhenin (Czech Republic) Eva Melicharová	4–6, 2–6
Winner	11.	5 September 1999	Spoleto, Italy	Clay	(Netherlands) Debby Haak	(Argentina) Clarisa Fernández (Italy) Francesca Schiavone	6–1, 6–1
Winner	12.	12 September 1999	Fano, Italy	Clay	(Netherlands) Debby Haak	(Hungary) Katalin Marosi (Spain) Alicia Ortuño	6–1, 6–4
Winner	13.	19 September 1999	Reggio Calabria, Italy	Clay	(Netherlands) Debby Haak	(Italy) Alice Canepa (Italy) Tathiana Garbin	6–1, 6–1
Runner-up	14.	12 June 2000	Lenzerheide, Switzerland	Clay	(Netherlands) Yvette Basting	(Germany) Mia Buric (Germany) Bianka Lamade	5–7, 3–6
Winner	15.	30 July 2000	Dublin, Ireland	Carpet	(Australia) Catherine Barclay	(Australia) Trudi Musgrave (United Kingdom) Lorna Woodroffe	6–4, 7–5
Runner-up	16.	19 November 2000	Manila, Philippines	Clay	(Germany) Catherine Turinsky	(South Korea) Chae Kyung-yee (South Korea) Kim Jin-hee	2–4, 2–4, 0–4
Winner	17.	8 July 2001	Amsterdam, Netherlands	Clay	(South Africa) Mareze Joubert	(Indonesia) Romana Tedjakusuma (Japan) Remi Tezuka	6–2, 6–3
Winner	18.	31 March 2002	Athens, Greece	Clay	(Netherlands) Jolanda Mens	(Serbia and Montenegro) Ana Četnik (Serbia and Montenegro) Dragica Joksimović	7–5, 6–1
Runner-up	19.	21 July 2002	Campos do Jordão, Brazil	Hard	(Netherlands) Jolanda Mens	(Brazil) Bruna Colósio (Brazil) Carla Tiene	1–6, 6–4, 4–6
Runner-up	20.	2 March 2003	Bendigo, Australia	Hard	(Australia) Nicole Sewell	(Australia) Mireille Dittmann (Australia) Cindy Watson	6–7^{(2)}, 6–3, 4–6
Winner	21.	10 March 2003	Benalla, Australia	Grass	(Australia) Nicole Sewell	(India) Rushmi Chakravarthi (Japan) Ryoko Takemura	6–3, 4–6, 6–2
Winner	22.	24 March 2003	Albury, Australia	Grass	(Australia) Nicole Sewell	(Chinese Taipei) Chuang Chia-jung (New Zealand) Ilke Gers	2–6, 6–1, 6–4
Runner-up	23.	13 July 2003	Vancouver, Canada	Hard	(Australia) Nicole Sewell	(United States) Amanda Augustus (Canada) Mélanie Marois	6–7^{(4)}, 4–6
