= Nicole Rencken =

South African tennis player

- Country (sports): South Africa
- Born: 12 June 1981 (age 44) Durban, South Africa
- Plays: Right-handed
- Prize money: $48,425

Singles
- Career record: 119–114
- Career titles: 0
- Highest ranking: No. 283 (7 July 2003)

Doubles
- Career record: 122–102
- Career titles: 10 ITF
- Highest ranking: No. 164 (4 December 2000)

Team competitions
- Fed Cup: 7–4

Nicole Rencken (born 12 June 1981) is a former professional tennis player from South Africa.

== Career ==
Rencken was runner-up in the girls' doubles at the 1999 Australian Open, partnering Natalie Grandin.

On the professional circuit, she reached a best singles ranking of 283 and won ten ITF titles in doubles.

Both of her WTA Tour main-draw appearances were in doubles, in Oklahoma City in 2001, and then the following year at the Madrid Open.

From 2002 to 2004, Rencken played nine Fed Cup ties for South Africa, including a World Group Play-off against the Czech Republic in 2003.

== ITF Circuit finals ==
$25,000 tournaments
$10,000 tournaments

=== Singles: 1 (runner-up) ===
| Result | No. | Date | Tournament | Surface | Opponent | Score |
|---|---|---|---|---|---|---|
| Loss | 1. | 8 June 2003 | ITF Hilton Head, United States | Hard | (Czech Republic) Ludmila Richterová | 1–6, 0–6 |

=== Doubles: 18 (10 titles, 8 runner-ups) ===
| Result | No. | Date | Tournament | Surface | Partner | Opponents | Score |
|---|---|---|---|---|---|---|---|
| Win | 1. | 18 July 1999 | ITF Frinton, Great Britain | Grass | (South Africa) Natalie Grandin | (New Zealand) Leanne Baker (Australia) Nicole Sewell | 6–2, 3–6, 6–1 |
| Loss | 2. | 12 March 2000 | ITF Warrnambool, Australia | Grass | (South Africa) Natalie Grandin | (Australia) Jenny Belobrajdic (Australia) Kristen van Elden | 3–6, 4–6 |
| Loss | 3. | 19 March 2000 | ITF Benalla, Australia | Grass | (South Africa) Natalie Grandin | (Australia) Kylie Hunt (South Africa) Mareze Joubert | 3–6, 2–6 |
| Win | 4. | 26 March 2000 | ITF Wodonga, Australia | Grass | (South Africa) Natalie Grandin | (Australia) Kylie Hunt (South Africa) Mareze Joubert | 6–4, 6–4 |
| Loss | 5. | 2 April 2000 | ITF Corona, Australia | Grass | (South Africa) Natalie Grandin | (Australia) Cindy Watson (Australia) Christina Wheeler | 3–6, 6–7^{(11–13)} |
| Win | 6. | 21 May 2000 | ITF Edinburgh, Scotland | Clay | (South Africa) Natalie Grandin | (Tunisia) Selima Sfar (United Kingdom) Lorna Woodroffe | 0–6, 6–3, 6–4 |
| Win | 7. | 28 May 2000 | ITF Guimarães, Portugal | Hard | (South Africa) Natalie Grandin | (Portugal) Angela Cardoso (Portugal) Carlota Santos | 7–6^{(9–7)}, 2–6, 6–2 |
| Win | 8. | 11 June 2000 | ITF Pretoria, South Africa | Hard | (South Africa) Natalie Grandin | (South Africa) Chanelle Scheepers (South Africa) Carien Venter | 7–6^{(7–4)}, 6–2 |
| Loss | 9. | 18 June 2000 | ITF Benoni, South Africa | Hard | (South Africa) Natalie Grandin | (South Africa) Lucinda Gibbs (South Africa) Giselle Swart | 6–2, 4–6, 4–6 |
| Loss | 10. | 13 August 2000 | Ladies Open Hechingen, Germany | Clay | (South Africa) Natalie Grandin | (Brazil) Miriam D'Agostini (Germany) Angelika Rösch | 6–7^{(3–7)}, 2–6 |
| Win | 11. | 20 August 2000 | ITF London, England | Hard | (South Africa) Natalie Grandin | (Germany) Susi Bensch (India) Manisha Malhotra | 6–2, 5–7, 7–6^{(7–6)} |
| Loss | 12. | 5 November 2000 | ITF Gold Coast, Australia | Hard | (South Africa) Natalie Grandin | (United States) Amanda Augustus (Australia) Amy Jensen | 4–6, 3–6 |
| Win | 13. | 8 July 2001 | ITF Camaiore, Italy | Clay | (Argentina) Melisa Arévalo | (Croatia) Petra Dizdar (Croatia) Mia Marovic | 4–5 ret. |
| Loss | 14. | 1 June 2003 | ITF Houston, United States | Hard (i) | (Republic of Ireland) Yvonne Doyle | (Japan) Seiko Okamoto (Japan) Remi Tezuka | 7–5, 4–6, 3–6 |
| Win | 15. | 8 June 2003 | ITF Hilton Head, United States | Hard | (Republic of Ireland) Yvonne Doyle | (United States) Beau Jones (Latvia) Anžela Žguna | 6–3, 7–5 |
| Win | 16. | 27 April 2004 | ITF Bournemouth, England | Clay | (Australia) Jaslyn Hewitt | (Russia) Raissa Gourevitch (Russia) Ekaterina Kozhokina | 6–1, 7–6^{(7–3)} |
| Win | 17. | 4 May 2004 | ITF Edinburgh, Scotland | Clay | (United Kingdom) Anna Hawkins | (Russia) Raissa Gourevitch (Russia) Ekaterina Kozhokina | 7–6^{(7–3)}, 6–2 |
| Loss | 18. | 15 August 2004 | ITF Hampstead, England | Hard | (United Kingdom) Anna Hawkins | (India) Rushmi Chakravarthi (India) Sania Mirza | 3–6, 2–6 |

== See also ==
- List of South Africa Fed Cup team representatives
