= Mireille Dittmann =

Australian tennis player

- Country (sports): Australia
- Born: 10 January 1974 (age 51)
- Plays: Right-handed
- Prize money: $116,505

Singles
- Career record: 241–283
- Career titles: 2 ITF
- Highest ranking: No. 197 (12 August 2002)

Doubles
- Career record: 111–173
- Career titles: 5 ITF
- Highest ranking: No. 187 (21 July 2003)

Mireille Dittmann (born 10 January 1974) is a former professional tennis player from Australia.

== Biography ==
A right-handed player from Victoria, Dittmann had a career-high singles ranking of 197.

She qualified for the main draw of two WTA Tour tournaments in 2001, at Bali and Shanghai. In 2002, she featured in the Shanghai main draw again and lost her first-round match to Anna Kournikova, in front of a large centre court crowd who had come to see the high profile Russian.

In the 2002 season, she competed in the qualifying draws of all four Grand Slam tournaments.

== ITF Circuit finals ==
$25,000 tournaments
$10,000 tournaments

=== Singles: 10 (2–8) ===
| Result | No. | Date | Tournament | Surface | Opponent | Score |
|---|---|---|---|---|---|---|
| Loss | 1. | 7 March 1994 | ITF Mildura, Australia | Grass | (Australia) Shannon Peters | 1–6, 2–6 |
| Win | 1. | 30 March 1997 | ITF Warrnambool, Australia | Grass | (United Kingdom) Lorna Woodroffe | 3–6, 7–6, 6–4 |
| Loss | 2. | 10 August 1997 | ITF Catania, Italy | Clay | (Italy) Antonella Serra Zanetti | 6–2, 4–6, 4–6 |
| Loss | 3. | 17 August 1998 | ITF Mascali, Italy | Clay | (Romania) Andreea Ehritt-Vanc | 6–2, 3–6, 1–6 |
| Loss | 4. | 13 June 1999 | ITF Biel, Switzerland | Clay | (Switzerland) Laura Bao | 5–7, 4–6 |
| Win | 2. | 6 February 2000 | ITF Wellington, New Zealand | Hard | (New Zealand) Leanne Baker | 7–6^{(5)}, 1–6, 7–6^{(3)} |
| Loss | 5. | 12 March 2000 | ITF Warrnambool, Australia | Grass | (Japan) Akiko Morigami | 4–6, 7–5, 1–6 |
| Loss | 6. | 28 October 2001 | ITF Home Hill, Australia | Hard | (Japan) Akiko Morigami | 6–0, 4–6, 1–6 |
| Loss | 7. | 6 February 2005 | ITF Wellington, New Zealand | Hard | (New Zealand) Leanne Baker | 6–2, 1–6, 1–6 |
| Loss | 8. | 13 February 2005 | ITF Blenheim, New Zealand | Hard | (South Korea) Chang Kyung-mi | 7–5, 3–6, 6–7^{(2)} |

=== Doubles: 11 (5–6) ===
| Result | No. | Date | Tournament | Surface | Partner | Opponents | Score |
|---|---|---|---|---|---|---|---|
| Win | 1. | 22 August 1993 | ITF Koksijde, Belgium | Clay | (Australia) Natalie Dittmann | (Czech Republic) Jitka Dubcová (Czech Republic) Ivana Havrlíková | 7–5, 2–6, 6–3 |
| Win | 2. | 18 August 1996 | ITF Koksijde, Belgium | Clay | (Australia) Natalie Dittmann | (Spain) Cristina de Subijana (Spain) Rosa María Pérez | 6–4, 6–1 |
| Loss | 1. | 17 August 1998 | ITF Carrabba, Italy | Clay | (Australia) Natalie Dittmann | (Russia) Ekaterina Sysoeva (Japan) Ayami Takase | 2–6, 0–6 |
| Win | 3. | 13 June 1999 | ITF Biel, Switzerland | Clay | (Australia) Natalie Dittmann | (Netherlands) Debby Haak (Netherlands) Andrea van den Hurk | 7–5, 1–6, 6–1 |
| Loss | 2. | 15 August 1999 | Open Saint Gaudens, France | Clay | (United Kingdom) Nicola Payne | (Colombia) Giana Gutiérrez (Argentina) Sabrina Valenti | 3–6, 2–6 |
| Win | 4. | 6 February 2000 | ITF Wellington, New Zealand | Hard | (Australia) Kristen van Elden | (Australia) Jenny Belobrajdic (Hong Kong) Tong Ka-po | 7–6^{(6)}, 6–4 |
| Win | 5. | 2 March 2003 | ITF Bendigo, Australia | Hard | (Australia) Cindy Watson | (Australia) Nicole Sewell (Netherlands) Andrea van den Hurk | 7–6^{(2)}, 3–6, 6–4 |
| Loss | 3. | 7 July 2003 | Bella Cup, Poland | Clay | (Sweden) Helena Ejeson | (Czech Republic) Zuzana Hejdová (Ukraine) Olena Antypina | 3–6, 3–6 |
| Loss | 4. | 28 March 2004 | ITF Yarrawonga, Australia | Grass | (Australia) Kristen van Elden | (Australia) Emily Hewson (Australia) Nicole Kriz | 3–6, 2–6 |
| Loss | 5. | 22 June 2004 | ITF Båstad, Sweden | Clay | (Sweden) Hanna Nooni | (Czech Republic) Zuzana Hejdová (Germany) Vanessa Henke | 6–2, 2–6, 3–6 |
| Loss | 6. | 24 September 2004 | ITF Canberra, Australia | Clay | (Australia) Cindy Watson | (Australia) Daniella Jeflea (Australia) Evie Dominikovic | 3–6, 1–6 |
