= Kristen van Elden =

Australian tennis player (born 1981)

- Country (sports): Australia
- Born: 18 September 1981 (age 44)
- Prize money: $45,730

Singles
- Career record: 100–102
- Career titles: 1 ITF
- Highest ranking: No. 262 (18 March 2002)

Doubles
- Career record: 77–71
- Career titles: 9 ITF
- Highest ranking: No. 293 (17 March 2003)

Kristen van Elden (born 18 September 1981) is a former professional tennis player from Australia.

== Biography ==
A former scholarship holder at the Victorian Institute of Sport, van Elden had a best ranking on the professional tour of 262 in the world.

She competed mainly on the ITF Women's Circuit, with most of her titles coming in doubles.

Her only WTA Tour main-draw appearance came at the 2004 Ordina Open in the Netherlands, where she and Russia's Galina Fokina teamed up to make the quarterfinals of the doubles.

== ITF Circuit finals ==
$25,000 tournaments
$10,000 tournaments

=== Singles (1–4) ===
Result	No.	Date	Tournament	Surface	Opponent	Score
Loss	1.	19 March 2000	ITF Benalla, Australia	Grass	(Australia) Jenny Belobrajdic	3–6, 1–6
Loss	2.	18 March 2001	ITF Benalla, Australia	Grass	(Japan) Miho Saeki	6–3, 1–6, 2–6
Loss	3.	25 March 2001	ITF Wodonga, Australia	Grass	(Australia) Beti Sekulovski	2–6, 2–6
Loss	4.	1 April 2001	ITF Corowa, Australia	Grass	(Japan) Miho Saeki	1–6, 2–6
Win	1.	16 July 2001	ITF Frinton, England	Grass	(Russia) Ekaterina Sysoeva	3–6, 6–4, 7–5

=== Doubles (9–4) ===
Result	No.	Date	Tournament	Surface	Partner	Opponents	Score
Win	1.	6 February 2000	ITF Wellington, New Zealand	Hard	(Australia) Mireille Dittmann	(Australia) Jenny Belobrajdic (Hong Kong) Tong Ka-po	7–6^{(6)}, 6–4
Win	2.	12 March 2000	ITF Warrnambool, Australia	Grass	(Australia) Jenny Belobrajdic	(South Africa) Natalie Grandin (South Africa) Nicole Rencken	6–3, 6–4
Loss	1.	12 June 2000	ITF Hoorn, Netherlands	Clay	(Romania) Diana Gherghi	(Argentina) Eugenia Chialvo (Argentina) Paula Racedo	6–4, 2–6, 0–6
Win	3.	26 June 2000	ITF Velp, Netherlands	Clay	(Australia) Jenny Belobrajdic	(Germany) Camilla Kremer (Hungary) Katalin Miskolczi	6–1, 6–2
Loss	2.	24 July 2000	ITF Horb, Germany	Clay	(Czech Republic) Zuzana Hejdová	(Poland) Patrycja Bandurowska (Argentina) María Emilia Salerni	3–6, 4–6
Win	4.	19 March 2001	ITF Wodonga, Australia	Grass	(Australia) Sarah Stone	(Australia) Beti Sekulovski (Australia) Nicole Sewell	3–6, 7–6^{(4)}, 6–4
Win	5.	24 June 2001	ITF Velp, Netherlands	Clay	(Australia) Beti Sekulovski	(Netherlands) Natasha Galouza (Netherlands) Lotty Seelen	1–6, 6–4, 7–6^{(3)}
Win	6.	24 March 2002	ITF Yarrawonga, Australia	Grass	(Australia) Jenny Belobrajdic	(Australia) Lauren Cheung (Australia) Kim Coventry	6–4, 6–2
Loss	3.	30 June 2002	ITF Fontanafredda, Italy	Clay	(Netherlands) Susanne Trik	(Belgium) Leslie Butkiewicz (Belgium) Patty Van Acker	5–7, 3–6
Win	7.	1 February 2003	ITF Wellington, New Zealand	Hard	(Australia) Lauren Breadmore	(Chinese Taipei) Chuang Chia-jung (New Zealand) Ilke Gers	6–4, 6–1
Win	8.	3 February 2004	ITF Wellington, New Zealand	Hard	(New Zealand) Shelley Stephens	(Australia) Emily Hewson (Australia) Nicole Kriz	6–1, 3–6, 6–3
Loss	4.	28 March 2004	ITF Yarrawonga, Australia	Grass	(Australia) Mireille Dittmann	(Australia) Emily Hewson (Australia) Nicole Kriz	3–6, 2–6
Win	9..	4 July 2004	ITF Heerhugowaard, Netherlands	Clay	(Sweden) Aleksandra Srndovic	(Netherlands) Daniëlle Harmsen (Netherlands) Susanne Trik	6–1, 6–2
