= Nicole Kriz =

Australian tennis player

- Country (sports): Australia
- Residence: Sydney
- Born: 13 December 1983 (age 41); Bankstown, New South Wales
- Height: 1.64 m (5 ft 5 in)
- Turned pro: 2001
- Retired: 2010
- Plays: Right (one-handed backhand)
- Prize money: $86,177

Singles
- Career record: 114–119
- Career titles: 2 ITF
- Highest ranking: No. 332 (4 August 2008)

Doubles
- Career record: 202–115
- Career titles: 23 ITF
- Highest ranking: No. 104 (9 July 2007)

Grand Slam doubles results
- Australian Open: 1R (2008, 2009, 2010)
- Wimbledon: Q1 (2007)

Nicole Kriz (born 13 December 1983) is an Australian former tennis player. Her career-high WTA doubles ranking is No. 104, achieved on 9 July 2007. Her career-high singles ranking is world No. 332, which she reached on 4 August 2008.

== Early life ==
Kriz was born on 13 December 1983, in Bankstown, New South Wales, Australia, to Mike and Seija Kriz. She was educated at the Presbyterian Ladies' College, Sydney, in Croydon, leaving at the end of Year 10, in 1999, to focus on her tennis career.

Kriz won the $25k Australian Challenger event in Berri, beating top-100 player Marina Erakovic in the final. She also defeated the No. 2 seed Monique Adamczak in the semifinals. Both wins were by third set tiebreakers.

Kriz retired from pro tour in 2010.

== WTA Tour finals ==
=== Doubles: 1 (runner-up) ===
Legend Grand Slam tournaments Premier M & Premier 5 Premier International (0–1)	Finals by surface Hard (0–1) Clay (0–0) Grass (0–0) Carpet (0–0)

Result	Date	Tier	Tournament	Surface	Partner	Opponents	Score
Loss	27 September 2009	International	Korea Open, South Korea	Hard	(United States) Carly Gullickson	(Chinese Taipei) Chan Yung-jan (United States) Abigail Spears	3–6, 4–6

=== WTA Tour highlights (doubles) ===
- 2007 – SF: Tier IV Prague, Czech Republic w/ (New Zealand) Leanne Baker
- 2007 – QF: Tier IV Fes, Morocco w/ (New Zealand) Leanne Baker
- 2007 – QF: Tier III Acapulco, Mexico w/ (New Zealand) Leanne Baker
- 2007 – QF: Tier III Bogotá, Colombia w/ (New Zealand) Leanne Baker
- 2007 – QF: Tier IV Auckland, New Zealand w/ Leanne Baker

== ITF Circuit finals ==
$50,000 tournaments
$25,000 tournaments
$10,000 tournaments

=== Singles: 3 (2 titles, 1 runner-up) ===
Outcome	No.	Date	Tournament	Surface	Opponent	Score
Runner-up	1.	23 September 2001	ITF Ibaraki, Japan	Hard	(Australia) Samantha Stosur	0–6, 1–6
Winner	1.	10 August 2003	ITF Rebecq, Belgium	Clay	(Montenegro) Danica Krstajić	3–6, 6–0, 6–1
Winner	2.	17 February 2008	ITF Berri, Australia	Grass	(Australia) Marina Erakovic	6–4, 4–6, 7–6^{(3)}

=== Doubles: 35 (23 titles, 12 runner-ups) ===
Outcome	No.	Date	Tournament	Surface	Partner	Opponents	Score
Winner	1.	18 September 2000	ITF Greenville, United States	Clay	(Belarus) Evgenia Subbotina	(United States) Kristy Blumberg (United States) Elizabeth Schmidt	6–2, 6–2
Winner	2.	25 September 2000	ITF Raleigh, United States	Clay	(Belarus) Evgenia Subbotina	(United States) Anne Plessinger (United States) Jacqueline Trail	7–5, 6–1
Runner-up	1.	3 February 2002	ITF Wellington, New Zealand	Hard	(Australia) Sarah Stone	(Chinese Taipei) Chan Chin-wei (Chinese Taipei) Chuang Chia-jung	6–4, 6–7^{(3)}, 2–6
Winner	3.	11 March 2002	ITF Benalla, Australia	Grass	(Australia) Sarah Stone	(Australia) Casey Dellacqua (Germany) Svenja Weidemann	7–5, 6–1
Winner	4.	23 March 2002	Bendigo International, Australia	Grass	(Australia) Sarah Stone	(Australia) Rochelle Rosenfield (Germany) Madita Suer	3–6, 7–5, 6–3
Winner	5.	4 August 2002	ITF Dublin, Ireland	Carpet	(United Kingdom) Anna Hawkins	(United Kingdom) Rebecca Rankin (Serbia) Višnja Vuletić	6–2, 7–5
Winner	6.	25 August 2002	ITF Westende, Belgium	Clay	(Belgium) Leslie Butkiewicz	(Ukraine) Valeria Bondarenko (Lithuania) Edita Liachovičiūtė	6–1, 7–6^{(4)}
Runner-up	2.	21 September 2003	ITF Sunderland, England	Hard	(Netherlands) Kim Kilsdonk	(Republic of Ireland) Claire Curran (Sweden) Helena Ejeson	2–6, 1–6
Winner	7.	28 September 2003	GB Pro-Series Glasgow, UK	Hard	(Netherlands) Kim Kilsdonk	(New Zealand) Leanne Baker (Italy) Francesca Lubiani	7–5, 6–2
Runner-up	3.	3 February 2004	ITF Wellington, New Zealand	Grass	(Australia) Emily Hewson	(New Zealand) Shelley Stephens (Australia) Kristen van Elden	1–6, 6–3, 3–6
Runner-up	4.	21 March 2004	ITF Yarrawonga, Australia	Grass	(Australia) Emily Hewson	(Australia) Beti Sekulovski (Australia) Cindy Watson	3–6, 6–4, 4–6
Winner	8.	28 March 2004	ITF Yarrawonga, Australia	Grass	(Australia) Emily Hewson	(Australia) Mireille Dittmann (Australia) Kristen van Elden	6–3, 6–2
Runner-up	5.	9 May 2004	Fukuoka International, Japan	Carpet	(Australia) Monique Adamczak	(Japan) Rika Fujiwara (Japan) Saori Obata	2–6, 4–6
Runner-up	6.	17 October 2004	ITF Mackay, Australia	Hard	(Australia) Monique Adamczak	(Australia) Daniella Dominikovic (Australia) Evie Dominikovic	w/o
Runner-up	7.	20 March 2005	ITF Yarrawonga, Australia	Grass	(Australia) Emily Hewson	(Australia) Lara Picone (Russia) Julia Efremova	4–6, 3–6
Runner-up	8.	17 March 2006	ITF Canberra, Australia	Clay	(New Zealand) Leanne Baker	(Australia) Monique Adamczak (Australia) Christina Horiatopoulos	6–7, 1–6
Winner	9.	25 June 2006	ITF Fort Worth, United States	Hard	(United States) Christina Fusano	(Argentina) Maria-Victoria Domina (United States) Story Tweedie-Yates	2–6, 6–4, 6–1
Winner	10.	23 July 2006	ITF Hamilton, Canada	Clay	(United States) Story Tweedie-Yates	(Argentina) Soledad Esperón (Canada) Aleksandra Wozniak	6–4, 6–1
Winner	11.	6 August 2006	Vancouver Open, Canada	Hard	(United States) Story Tweedie-Yates	(United States) Jennifer Magley (United States) Courtney Nagle	7–5, 6–3
Winner	12.	8 October 2006	ITF Troy, United States	Hard	(New Zealand) Leanne Baker	(South Africa) Chanelle Scheepers (United States) Neha Uberoi	6–7^{(1)}, 7–5, 6–3
Winner	13.	29 October 2006	ITF Augusta, United States	Hard	(New Zealand) Leanne Baker	(South Africa) Chanelle Scheepers (United States) Neha Uberoi	7–6^{(3)}, 6–1
Runner-up	9.	19 November 2006	ITF Port Pirie, Australia	Hard	(Australia) Christina Horiatopoulos	(South Africa) Natalie Grandin (United States) Raquel Kops-Jones	2–6, 1–6
Winner	14.	7 April 2007	ITF Pelham, United States	Clay	(United States) Carly Gullickson	(Czech Republic) Michaela Paštiková (Czech Republic) Hana Šromová	6–2, 2–6, 6–0
Runner-up	10.	13 May 2007	ITF Catania, Italy	Clay	(New Zealand) Leanne Baker	(Belgium) Debbrich Feys (Belarus) Darya Kustova	4–6, 4–6
Winner	15.	7 February 2008	ITF Mildura, Australia	Grass	(New Zealand) Marina Erakovic	(Australia) Monique Adamczak (Australia) Christina Wheeler	6–4, 6–4
Winner	16.	17 February 2008	ITF Berri, Australia	Grass	(New Zealand) Marina Erakovic	(Australia) Shannon Golds (Australia) Emelyn Starr	2–6, 7–6^{(4)}, [10–3]
Winner	17.	13 July 2008	ITF Allentown, United States	Hard	(United States) Carly Gullickson	(Chinese Taipei) Chan Chin-wei (South Africa) Natalie Grandin	6–2, 6–3
Winner	18.	2 August 2008	Vancouver Open, Canada	Hard	(United States) Carly Gullickson	(United States) Christina Fusano (Japan) Junri Namigata	6–7^{(4)}, 6–1, [10–5]
Winner	19.	3 May 2009	ITF Charlottesville, United States	Clay	(United States) Carly Gullickson	(United States) Angela Haynes (Russia) Alina Jidkova	7–5, 3–6, [10–7]
Runner-up	11.	31 May 2009	Carson Challenger, United States	Hard	(Australia) Monique Adamczak	(United States) Laura Granville (United States) Riza Zalameda	3–6, 4–6
Winner	20.	24 July 2009	ITF Kharkiv, Ukraine	Clay	(Australia) Monique Adamczak	(Ukraine) Kristina Antoniychuk (Ukraine) Irina Buryachok	6–3, 7–6^{(4)}
Winner	21.	14 August 2009	ITF Koksijde, Belgium	Clay	(Australia) Shannon Golds	(Sweden) Johanna Larsson (United Kingdom) Anna Smith	7–6^{(3)}, 6–2
Winner	22.	18 September 2009	ITF Darwin, Australia	Clay	(Australia) Alicia Molik	(Australia) Tyra Calderwood (Australia) Olivia Rogowska	6–3, 6–4
Winner	23.	3 October 2009	ITF Hamanako, Japan	Carpet	(United States) Carly Gullickson	(Indonesia) Yayuk Basuki (Chinese Taipei) Hwang I-hsuan	4–6, 7–6^{(2)}, [10–5]
Runner-up	12.	3 April 2010	ITF Pelham, United States	Clay	(Chinese Taipei) Chan Chin-wei	(United States) Mallory Cecil (United States) Jamie Hampton	4–6, 3–6

=== Top five career singles wins ===
1. 138– (Australia) Samantha Stosur – 2003
2. 150– (New Zealand) Marina Erakovic – 2008
3. 168– (United Kingdom) Melanie South – 2006
4. 173– (Australia) Monique Adamczak – 2008
5. 181– (Japan) Junri Namigata – 2008

== See also ==
- List of Old Girls of PLC Sydney
