= Emily Hewson =

Australian tennis player

- Country (sports): Australia
- Residence: Sydney, Australia
- Born: 31 July 1982 (age 43)
- Turned pro: 2001
- Plays: Right (one-handed backhand)
- Prize money: $66,262

Singles
- Career record: 137–131
- Career titles: 2 ITF
- Highest ranking: No. 314 (23 July 2007)

Grand Slam singles results
- Australian Open: Q1 (2008)

Doubles
- Career record: 89–91
- Career titles: 4 ITF
- Highest ranking: No. 204 (25 February 2008)

Emily Hewson (born 31 July 1982) is an Australian former tennis player.

Her highest WTA singles ranking is 314, reached on 23 July 2007. Her career-high in doubles is 204, which she achieved on 25 February 2008.

In her career, Hewson won two singles and four doubles titles on the ITF Women's Circuit.

== ITF Circuit finals ==
Legend
$25,000 tournaments
$10,000 tournaments

=== Singles: 5 (2 titles, 3 runner-ups) ===
Result	No.	Date	Tournament	Surface	Opponent	Score
Win	1.	28 March 2004	ITF Yarrawonga, Australia	Grass	(Canada) Kavitha Krishnamurthy	6–7^{(4–7)}, 7–6^{(8–6)}, 6–3
Win	2.	26 September 2004	ITF Hiroshima, Japan	Grass	(Japan) Yurika Sema	6–1, 7–6^{(8–6)}
Loss	3.	20 March 2005	ITF Yarrawonga, Australia	Grass	(New Zealand) Marina Erakovic	3–6, 6–4, 4–6
Loss	4.	30 July 2005	ITF Dublin, Ireland	Carpet	(Netherlands) Suzanne van Hartingsveldt	3–6, 2–6
Loss	5.	3 September 2005	ITF Gladstone, Australia	Hard	(Australia) Daniella Jeflea	4–6, 3–6

=== Doubles: 11 (4 titles, 7 runner-ups) ===
Outcome	No.	Date	Tournament	Surface	Partner	Opponents	Score
Runner-up	1.	13 May 2001	ITF Swansea, Wales	Clay	(Russia) Maria Bobedova	(Russia) Natalia Egorova (Russia) Ekaterina Sysoeva	6–4, 6–7^{(5–7)}, 0–6
Runner-up	2.	27 May 2001	ITF Tel Aviv, Israel	Hard	(South Africa) Natasha van der Merwe	(Russia) Irina Kornienko (Greece) Maria Pavlidou	w/o
Runner-up	3.	5 August 2001	ITF Dublin, Ireland	Carpet	(Australia) Bree Calderwood	(Republic of Ireland) Yvonne Doyle (Republic of Ireland) Karen Nugent	4–6, 2–6
Runner-up	4.	21 March 2004	ITF Wellington, New Zealand	Grass	(Australia) Nicole Kriz	(Australia) Shelley Stephens (Australia) Kristen van Elden	1–6, 6–3, 3–6
Runner-up	5.	21 March 2004	ITF Yarrawonga, Australia	Grass	(Australia) Nicole Kriz	(New Zealand) Beti Sekulovski (Australia) Cindy Watson	3–6, 6–4, 4–6
Winner	6.	28 March 2004	ITF Yarrawonga, Australia	Grass	(Australia) Nicole Kriz	(Australia) Mireille Dittmann (Australia) Kristen van Elden	6–3, 6–2
Runner-up	7.	20 March 2005	ITF Yarrawonga, Australia	Grass	(Australia) Nicole Kriz	(Australia) Lara Picone (Russia) Julia Efremova	4–6, 3–6
Winner	8.	16 March 2007	ITF Perth, Australia	Hard	(Australia) Casey Dellacqua	(Australia) Trudi Musgrave (Australia) Christina Wheeler	6–4, 4–6, 6–2
Winner	9.	23 March 2007	ITF Kalgoorlie, Australia	Grass	(Australia) Christina Wheeler	(Indonesia) Vivien Silfany-Tony (Indonesia) Lavinia Tananta	6–4, 6–3
Runner-up	10.	9 November 2007	ITF Port Pirie, Australia	Hard	(Australia) Daniella Dominikovic	(United Kingdom) Sarah Borwell (United States) Courtney Nagle	2–6, 2–6
Winner	11.	23 August 2008	ITF Trecastagni, Italy	Hard	(Turkey) Pemra Özgen	(Italy) Valeria Casillo (Italy) Lilly Raffa	w/o
