= Daniella Jeflea =

Australian tennis player

- Country (sports): Australia
- Residence: Sydney
- Born: 12 January 1987 (age 38) Sydney
- Turned pro: 2003
- Plays: Right (two-handed backhand)
- Prize money: $98,831

Singles
- Career record: 106–101
- Career titles: 0 WTA, 1 ITF
- Highest ranking: No. 324 (3 October 2005)

Doubles
- Career record: 131–87
- Career titles: 10 ITF
- Highest ranking: No. 127 (10 October 2011)

Daniella Jeflea (née Dominikovic; born 12 January 1987) is an Australian former tennis player.

Her highest singles ranking is world No. 324, which she achieved on 3 October 2005. In October 2011, she peaked at No. 127 in the WTA doubles rankings.

She is the younger sister of retired player Evie Dominikovic.

== ITF Circuit finals ==
$25,000 tournaments
$10,000 tournaments

=== Singles (1–1) ===
Result	Date	Location	Surface	Opponent	Score
Loss	6 March 2005	Warrnambool, Australia	Grass	(New Zealand) Marina Erakovic	3–6, 6–4, 4–6
Win	28 August 2006	Gladstone, Australia	Hard	(Australia) Emily Hewson	6–4, 6–3

=== Doubles (10–10) ===
Result	No.	Date	Location	Surface	Partner	Opponents	Score
Win	1.	25 November 2002	Mount Gambier, Australia	Hard	(Australia) Evie Dominikovic	(United Kingdom) Jane O'Donoghue (South Africa) Chanelle Scheepers	w/o
Win	2.	24 September 2004	Canberra, Australia	Clay	(Australia) Evie Dominikovic	(Australia) Mireille Dittmann (Australia) Cindy Watson	6–3, 6–1
Win	3.	11 October 2004	Mackay, Australia	Hard	(Australia) Evie Dominikovic	(Australia) Monique Adamczak (Australia) Nicole Kriz	w/o
Win	4.	18 October 2004	Rockhampton, Australia	Hard	(Australia) Evie Dominikovic	(Australia) Casey Dellacqua (Australia) Nicole Sewell	7–5, 6–2
Loss	1.	8 November 2004	Port Pirie, Australia	Hard	(Australia) Evie Dominikovic	(Australia) Casey Dellacqua (United States) Sunitha Rao	6–4, 3–6, 6–7
Loss	2.	15 November 2004	Nuriootpa, Australia	Hard	(Australia) Evie Dominikovic	(South Korea) Cho Yoon-jeong (South Korea) Kim Jin-hee	5–7, 2–6
Loss	3.	12 June 2005	Grado, Italy	Clay	(Belarus) Darya Kustova	(Russia) Maria Kondratieva (Belarus) Tatsiana Uvarova	1–6, 6–3, 5–7
Win	5.	24 September 2005	Mackay, Australia	Hard	(Australia) Casey Dellacqua	(Australia) Monique Adamczak (Australia) Olivia Lukaszewicz	7–6, 7–6
Win	6.	1 October 2005	Rockhampton, Australia	Hard	(Australia) Casey Dellacqua	(Australia) Beti Sekulovski (Sweden) Aleksandra Sndovic	6–4, 6–2
Win	7.	15 October 2005	Lyneham, Australia	Clay	(Australia) Casey Dellacqua	(Australia) Alison Bai (Australia) Jenny Swift	6–4, 6–3
Win	8.	28 August 2006	Gladstone, Australia	Hard	(Australia) Shayna McDowell	(Australia) Renee Lampret (Australia) Jenny Swift	4–6, 6–4, 6–4
Loss	4.	9 October 2006	Melbourne, Australia	Hard	(Australia) Evie Dominikovic	(Australia) Casey Dellacqua (United States) Sunitha Rao	3–6, 2–6
Loss	5.	12 November 2006	Mount Gambier, Australia	Hard	(Australia) Sophie Ferguson	(South Africa) Natalie Grandin (Australia) Christina Wheeler	4–6, 6–4, 4–6
Loss	6.	9 November 2007	Port Pirie, Australia	Hard	(Australia) Emily Hewson	(United Kingdom) Sarah Borwell (United States) Courtney Nagle	2–6, 2–6
Loss	7.	17 October 2010	Mount Gambier, Australia	Hard	(Poland) Sandra Zaniewska	(Australia) Alison Bai (Brazil) Ana-Clara Duarte	w/o
Win	9.	7 November 2010	Kalgoorlie, Australia	Hard	(Australia) Jessica Moore	(Hungary) Tímea Babos (Australia) Monika Wejnert	6–4, 2–6, [10–6]
Win	10.	12 November 2010	Esperance, Australia	Hard	(Australia) Jessica Moore	(Japan) Chiaki Okadaue (Japan) Remi Tezuka	7–6^{(7–5)}, 6–3
Loss	8.	10 April 2011	Bundaberg, Australia	Clay	(Poland) Sandra Zaniewska	(Australia) Casey Dellacqua (Australia) Olivia Rogowska	5–7, 4–6
Loss	9.	28 May 2011	Gaziantep, Turkey	Hard	(Turkey) Melis Sezer	(Armenia) Ani Amiraghyan (Turkey) Başak Eraydın	2–6, 3–6
Loss	10.	18 June 2011	Istanbul, Turkey	Hard	(Turkey) Melis Sezer	(Poland) Marta Domachowska (Serbia) Teodora Mirčić	4–6, 2–6
