= Nicole Sewell =

Australian tennis player

- Country (sports): Australia
- Born: 1981 (age 43–44) Perth, Western Australia
- Plays: Right-handed
- Prize money: $67,573

Singles
- Career record: 77–113
- Career titles: 0
- Highest ranking: No. 380 (24 June 2002)

Doubles
- Career record: 128–117
- Career titles: 11 ITF
- Highest ranking: No. 107 (10 January 2005)

Grand Slam doubles results
- Australian Open: 2R (2003, 2004)
- Wimbledon: 1R (2003, 2004)
- US Open: 1R (2004)

Nicole Sewell (born 1981) is a former professional tennis player from Australia.

== Biography ==
A right-handed player from Perth, Sewell was most prominent on the doubles circuit, with 11 ITF titles and a best ranking of 107 in the world. She made most of her Grand Slam and WTA Tour main-draw appearances partnering Casey Dellacqua.

She is the daughter of former East Fremantle and Footscray footballer Jim Sewell.

== ITF finals ==
=== Singles (1–1) ===
$50,000 tournaments
$25,000 tournaments
$10,000 tournaments

Result	No.	Date	Tournament	Surface	Opponent	Score
Win	1.	10 March 2002	Warrnambool, Australia	Grass	(Australia) Lisa McShea	6–4, 3–6, 7–6^{(5)}
Loss	1.	7 March 2004	Warrnambool, Australia	Grass	(Australia) Casey Dellacqua	3–6, 6–3, 2–6

=== Doubles (11–12) ===
Result	No.	Date	Tournament	Surface	Partner	Opponents	Score
Loss	1.	3 May 1999	Poza Rica, Mexico	Hard	(Australia) Nadia Johnston	(Argentina) Paula Racedo (Switzerland) Aliénor Tricerri	1–6, 6–7^{(5)}
Loss	2.	17 May 1999	Ciudad Juárez, Mexico	Hard	(Australia) Kylie Hunt	(Mexico) Melody Falcó (Dominican Republic) Joelle Schad	6–3, 1–6, 3–6
Win	1.	11 July 1999	Felixstowe, United Kingdom	Grass	(New Zealand) Leanne Baker	(United Kingdom) Victoria Davies (United Kingdom) Kate Warne-Holland	6–1, 6–4
Loss	3.	17 September 1999	Frinton, United Kingdom	Grass	(New Zealand) Leanne Baker	(South Africa) Natalie Grandin (South Africa) Nicole Rencken	2–6, 6–3, 1–6
Win	2.	25 June 2000	Alkmaar, Netherlands	Clay	(South Africa) Mareze Joubert	(Argentina) Erica Krauth (Argentina) Vanessa Krauth	W/O
Loss	4.	23 July 2000	Frinton, United Kingdom	Grass	(South Africa) Mareze Joubert	(United Kingdom) Helen Crook (United Kingdom) Victoria Davies	2–6, 4–6
Win	3.	13 August 2000	Bath, United Kingdom	Clay	(South Africa) Mareze Joubert	(Australia) Jenny Belobrajdic (Japan) Ayami Takase	6–2, 6–2
Loss	5.	19 March 2001	Wodonga, Australia	Grass	(Australia) Beti Sekulovski	(Australia) Sarah Stone (Australia) Kristen van Elden	6–3, 6–7^{(4)}, 4–6
Loss	6.	1 April 2001	Benalla, Australia	Grass	(Australia) Beti Sekulovski	(Netherlands) Debby Haak (Netherlands) Jolanda Mens	4–6, 3–6
Loss	7.	28 October 2001	Home Hill, Australia	Hard	(Australia) Beti Sekulovski	(Australia) Lisa McShea (Australia) Trudi Musgrave	5–7, 4–6
Win	4.	23 June 2002	Lenzerheide, Switzerland	Clay	(Australia) Samantha Stosur	(Belgium) Leslie Butkiewicz (Belgium) Patty Van Acker	6–4, 6–3
Loss	8.	30 June 2002	Båstad, Sweden	Clay	(Australia) Samantha Stosur	(Germany) Andrea Glass (Czech Republic) Dominika Luzarová	4–6, 1–6
Win	5.	14 July 2002	Felixstowe, United Kingdom	Grass	(United States) Amanda Augustus	(Australia) Christina Horiatopoulos (Australia) Sarah Stone	7–6^{(5)}, 6–4
Win	6.	20 October 2002	Mackay, Australia	Hard	(South Africa) Natalie Grandin	(Australia) Sarah Stone (Australia) Samantha Stosur	6–3, 1–6, 6–4
Loss	9.	2 March 2003	Bendigo, Australia	Hard	(Netherlands) Andrea van den Hurk	(Australia) Mireille Dittmann (Australia) Cindy Watson	6–7^{(2)}, 6–3, 4–6
Winner	7.	10 March 2003	Benalla, Australia	Grass	(Netherlands) Andrea van den Hurk	(Japan) Rushmi Chakravarthi (Japan) Ryoko Takemura	6–3, 4–6, 6–2
Winner	8.	24 March 2003	Albury, Australia	Grass	(Netherlands) Andrea van den Hurk	(Chinese Taipei) Chuang Chia-jung (New Zealand) Ilke Gers	2–6, 6–1, 6–4
Loss	10.	13 July 2003	Vancouver, Canada	Hard	(Netherlands) Andrea van den Hurk	(United States) Amanda Augustus (Canada) Mélanie Marois	6–7^{(4)}, 4–6
Winner	9.	28 February 2004	Bendigo, Australia	Hard	(Australia) Casey Dellacqua	(Israel) Shahar Pe'er (Indonesia) Wynne Prakusya	6–2, 1–6, 6–2
Win	10.	6 June 2004	Surbiton, United Kingdom	Grass	(New Zealand) Leanne Baker	(South Africa) Surina De Beer (Republic of Ireland) Karen Nugent	2–6, 7–5, 7–6^{(6)}
Winner	11.	24 July 2004	Schenectady, United States	Hard	(Australia) Casey Dellacqua	(United States) Ansley Cargill (United States) Julie Ditty	3–6, 7–6, 6–2
Loss	11.	1 August 2004	Lexington, United States	Hard	(Australia) Casey Dellacqua	(Republic of Ireland) Claire Curran (South Africa) Natalie Grandin	6–7, 4–6
Loss	12.	23 October 2004	Rockhampton, Australia	Hard	(Australia) Casey Dellacqua	(Australia) Daniella Dominikovic (Australia) Evie Dominikovic	5–7, 2–6
