= Cindy Watson =

Australian tennis player

- Country (sports): Australia
- Born: 24 March 1978 (age 48) Australia
- Turned pro: 1999
- Retired: 2007
- Plays: Right-handed (two-handed backhand)
- Prize money: $189,446

Singles
- Career record: 233-214
- Career titles: 7 ITF
- Highest ranking: No. 131 (28 October 2002)

Grand Slam singles results
- Australian Open: 3R (2002)
- French Open: Q2 (2002)
- Wimbledon: Q2 (2002)
- US Open: Q1 (1999, 2002)

Doubles
- Career record: 115-142
- Career titles: 6 ITF
- Highest ranking: No. 108 (8 August 2005)

Grand Slam doubles results
- Australian Open: 2R (2005)

Cindy Watson (born 24 March 1978) is a retired tennis player from Australia.

== Career statistics ==
Her highest singles ranking is world No. 131, (achieved on 28 October 2002) and her highest doubles ranking is No. 108 (reached on 8 August 2005). Watson won 13 titles on the ITF Circuit in her career: seven in singles and six in doubles. Watson has taken part in many WTA Tour events.

== Biography ==
Her biggest career highlight is reaching the third round of the 2002 Australian Open. She defeated María José Martínez Sánchez and Emmanuelle Gagliardi in the first and second rounds, respectively, before falling to fourth seed Kim Clijsters, 1–6, 2–6 in the third round.

Watson played on two other Grand Slam tournaments- she fell in the first rounds of the 1999 Australian Open to Mary Pierce and of the 2005 Australian Open to Sania Mirza.

== ITF Circuit finals ==
=== Singles: 15 (7–8) ===
$50,000 tournaments
$25,000 tournaments
$10,000 tournaments

Result	No.	Date	Tournament	Surface	Opponent	Score
Loss	1.	19 July 1996	ITF Ilkley, United Kingdom	Grass	(South Africa) Surina De Beer	4–6, 6–7^{(5)}
Loss	2.	11 August 1996	ITF Southsea, United Kingdom	Grass	(United Kingdom) Lucie Ahl	3–6, 3–6
Win	1.	11 May 1997	ITF Maryborough, Australia	Hard	(Australia) Renee Reid	6–4, 6–2
Win	2.	7 June 1998	ITF Little Rock, United States	Hard	(South Korea) Choi Ju-yeon	5–7, 6–4, 6–3
Loss	3.	5 July 1998	ITF Edmond, United States	Hard	(Canada) Cristina Popescu	6–3, 4–6, 2–6
Loss	4.	18 October 1998	ITF Kooralbyn, Australia	Hard	(Australia) Lisa McShea	4–6, 7–5, 6–7
Win	3.	15 November 1998	ITF Bendigo, Australia	Hard	(Australia) Catherine Barclay	3–6, 6–0, 7–5
Win	4.	19 May 2001	ITF La Cañada Flintridge, United States	Hard	(France) Camille Pin	6–1, 6–3
Loss	5.	29 October 2001	ITF Mackay, Australia	Hard	(Australia) Christina Wheeler	3–6, 2–6
Win	5.	2 December 2001	ITF Mount Gambier, Australia	Hard	(Ukraine) Tatiana Perebiynis	6–3, 6–4
Loss	6.	3 March 2002	ITF Bendigo, Australia	Hard	(Japan) Yuka Yoshida	1–6, 6–7
Win	6.	8 February 2004	ITF Wellington, New Zealand	Hard	(Australia) Lauren Breadmore	6–4, 6–1
Loss	7.	9 March 2004	ITF Benalla, Australia	Grass	(New Zealand) Eden Marama	3–6, 6–4, 4–6
Win	7.	18 May 2004	ITF El Paso, United States	Hard	(United States) Angela Haynes	6–3, 7–6^{(3)}
Loss	8.	13 November 2005	ITF Port Pirie, Australia	Hard	(Australia) Casey Dellacqua	3–6, 5–7

=== Doubles: 14 (6–8) ===
Result	No.	Date	Tournament	Surface	Partner	Opponents	Score
Loss	1.	28 July 1996	ITF Dublin, Ireland	Grass	(Australia) Kylie Moulds	(Australia) Amy Jensen (Australia) Sarah Stanley	4–6, 4–6
Win	1.	28 July 1997	ITF Ilkley, United Kingdom	Grass	(Australia) Trudi Musgrave	(Australia) Gail Biggs (Russia) Julia Lutrova	6–1, 6–1
Loss	2.	22 February 1999	ITF Bendigo, Australia	Hard	(Australia) Trudi Musgrave	(Australia) Kerry-Anne Guse (Australia) Lisa McShea	4–6, 1–6
Win	2.	2 April 2000	Corowa, Australia	Grass	(Australia) Christina Wheeler	(South Africa) Natalie Grandin (South Africa) Nicole Rencken	6–3, 7–6^{(11)}
Loss	3.	3 July 2000	Edmond, United States	Hard	(United States) Jacqueline Trail	(South Korea) Chang Kyung-mi (Malaysia) Khoo Chin-bee	4–6, 4–6
Win	3.	31 July 2000	Harrisonburg, United States	Clay	(Japan) Rika Fujiwara	(United States) Lauren Kalvaria (United States) Gabriela Lastra	6–4, 5–7, 7–5
Loss	4.	2 December 2001	Mount Gambier, Australia	Hard	(Australia) Amanda Grahame	(Australia) Evie Dominikovic (Australia) Samantha Stosur	4–6, 4–6
Loss	5.	25 February 2002	Bendigo, Australia	Hard	(Australia) Trudi Musgrave	(Australia) Sarah Stone (Australia) Samantha Stosur	4–6, 3–6
Win	4.	2 March 2003	Bendigo, Australia	Hard	(Australia) Mireille Dittmann	(Australia) Nicole Sewell (Netherlands) Andrea van den Hurk	7–6^{(2)}, 3–6, 6–4
Win	5.	21 March 2004	Yarrawonga, Australia	Grass	(Australia) Beti Sekulovski	(Australia) Emily Hewson (Australia) Nicole Kriz	6–3, 4–6, 6–4
Loss	6.	24 September 2004	Canberra, Australia	Clay	(Australia) Mireille Dittmann	(Australia) Daniella Jeflea (Australia) Evie Dominikovic	3–6, 1–6
Loss	7.	26 February 2005	Bendigo, Australia	Hard	(Australia) Beti Sekulovski	(Australia) Casey Dellacqua (Australia) Trudi Musgrave	4–6, 6–7
Win	6.	1 May 2005	ITF Lafayette, United States	Clay	(Australia) Beti Sekulovski	(Brazil) Maria Fernanda Alves (Canada) Marie-Ève Pelletier	4–6, 6–4, 6–3
Loss	8.	26 February 2006	ITF Gosford, Australia	Hard	(Australia) Beti Sekulovski	(Chinese Taipei) Latisha Chan (Chinese Taipei) Chuang Chia-jung	2–6, 3–6
