= Beti Sekulovski =

Australian tennis player

- Country (sports): Australia
- Born: 17 May 1983 (age 43) Melbourne
- Plays: Right-handed
- Prize money: $60,970

Singles
- Career record: 103–86
- Career titles: 4 ITF
- Highest ranking: No. 273 (5 August 2002)

Doubles
- Career record: 89–78
- Career titles: 4 ITF
- Highest ranking: No. 120 (17 October 2005)

Grand Slam doubles results
- Australian Open: 2R (2005)

Beti Sekulovski (born 17 May 1983) is a former professional tennis player from Australia.

== Biography ==
Sekulovski was born in Melbourne, to parents who emigrated from Macedonia.

On the professional tour, she had a highest singles ranking of 273 and was ranked 120 in the world for doubles.

She made two main-draw appearances in the women's doubles at the Australian Open, both times as a wildcard pairing with Cindy Watson.

Since retiring, she has worked as a tennis coach and is currently coaching Jaimee Fourlis.

In addition, Sekulovski appeared in the 2004 film, Wimbledon, starring Kirsten Dunst.

== ITF Circuit finals ==
=== Singles: 7 (4 titles, 3 runner-ups) ===
$50,000 tournaments
$25,000 tournaments
$10,000 tournaments

Outcome	No.	Date	Tournament	Surface	Opponent	Score
Winner	1.	25 March 2001	ITF Wodonga, Australia	Grass	(Australia) Kristen van Elden	6–2, 6–2
Runner-up	1.	23 September 2001	ITF Osaka, Japan	Hard	(Australia) Samantha Stosur	2–6, 6–3, 5–7
Winner	2.	24 March 2002	ITF Yarrawonga, Australia	Grass	(Australia) Lisa McShea	7–6^{(4)}, 1–6, 6–4
Winner	3.	29 August 2005	ITF Saitama, Japan	Hard	(Japan) Mari Tanaka	3–6, 6–4, 6–3
Winner	4.	7 September 2005	ITF Kyoto, Japan	Carpet	(China) Huang Lei	6–2, 3–0 ret.
Runner-up	2.	2 October 2005	ITF Rockhampton, Australia	Hard	(Australia) Casey Dellacqua	1–6, 4–6
Runner-up	3.	16 October 2005	ITF Lyneham, Australia	Clay	(Australia) Lauren Breadmore	5–7, 4–6

=== Doubles: 14 (4 titles, 10 runner-ups) ===
Outcome	No.	Date	Tournament	Surface	Partner	Opponents	Score
Runner-up	1.	19 March 2001	ITF Wodonga, Australia	Grass	(Australia) Nicole Sewell	(Australia) Sarah Stone (Australia) Kristen van Elden	6–3, 6–7^{(4)}, 4–6
Runner-up	2.	1 April 2001	ITF Benalla, Australia	Grass	(Australia) Nicole Sewell	(Netherlands) Debby Haak (Netherlands) Jolanda Mens	4–6, 3–6
Winner	1.	24 June 2001	ITF Velp, Netherlands	Clay	(Australia) Kristen van Elden	(Netherlands) Natasha Galouza (Netherlands) Lotty Seelen	1–6, 6–4, 7–6^{(3)}
Winner	2.	16 July 2001	ITF Frinton, United Kingdom	Grass	(Australia) Sarah Stone	(Republic of Ireland) Yvonne Doyle (Republic of Ireland) Karen Nugent	7–6^{(5)}, 6–4
Runner-up	3.	16 September 2001	ITF Ibaraki, Japan	Hard	(Australia) Sarah Stone	(Australia) Samantha Stosur (Australia) Melissa Dowse	4–6, 7–5, 2–6
Runner-up	4.	23 September 2001	ITF Osaka, Japan	Hard	(Australia) Sarah Stone	(Australia) Samantha Stosur (Australia) Melissa Dowse	7–5, 3–6, 3–6
Runner-up	5.	28 October 2001	ITF Home Hill, Australia	Hard	(Australia) Nicole Sewell	(Australia) Lisa McShea (Australia) Trudi Musgrave	5–7, 4–6
Winner	3.	21 March 2004	ITF Yarrawonga, Australia	Grass	(Australia) Cindy Watson	(Australia) Emily Hewson (Australia) Nicole Kriz	6–3, 4–6, 6–4
Runner-up	6.	5 February 2005	ITF Wellington, New Zealand	Hard	(Sweden) Aleksandra Srndovic	(South Korea) Chang Kyung-mi (Japan) Maki Arai	6–3, 4–6, 4–6
Runner-up	7.	13 February 2005	ITF Blenheim, New Zealand	Hard	(Sweden) Aleksandra Srndovic	(South Korea) Chang Kyung-mi (Japan) Maki Arai	4–6, 6–7
Runner-up	8.	26 February 2005	ITF Bendigo, Australia	Hard	(Australia) Cindy Watson	(Australia) Casey Dellacqua (Australia) Trudi Musgrave	4–6, 6–7
Winner	4.	1 May 2005	ITF Lafayette, United States	Clay	(Australia) Cindy Watson	(Brazil) Maria Fernanda Alves (Canada) Marie-Ève Pelletier	4–6, 6–4, 6–3
Runner-up	9.	27 September 2005	ITF Rockhampton, Australia	Hard	(Sweden) Aleksandra Srndovic	(Australia) Casey Dellacqua (Australia) Daniella Jeflea	4–6, 2–6
Runner-up	10.	26 February 2006	ITF Gosford, Australia	Hard	(Australia) Cindy Watson	(Chinese Taipei) Chan Yung-jan (Chinese Taipei) Chuang Chia-jung	2–6, 3–6
