= 1997 Fed Cup Europe/Africa Zone Group I – Knockout Stage =

The Knockout Stage of the 1997 Fed Cup Europe/Africa Zone Group I was the final stage of the Zonal Competition involving teams from Europe and Africa. Those that qualified for this stage placed first and second in their respective pools.

Placing	Pool A	Pool B	Pool C	Pool D
1	Russia	Italy	Belarus	Slovenia
2	Greece	Sweden	Hungary	Israel
3	Bulgaria	Romania	Poland	Latvia
4		Ukraine	Finland	Georgia

The eight teams were then randomly drawn into two two-stage knockout tournaments, with the winners advancing to the World Group II Play-offs.

== Draw ==
Semifinals
Russia	2
Israel	1
Sweden	1
Belarus	2
Italy	3
Greece	0
Hungary	2
Slovenia	1

Finals
Russia	3
Belarus	0
Italy	2
Hungary	1

=== Semifinals ===
==== Russia vs. Israel ====
Russia
2
Bari T.C., Bari, Italy
25 April 1997
Red clay (outdoors)

Israel
1

			1	2	3
1	(Russia) (Israel)	Anna Kournikova; Hila Rosen	1; 6	6^{3} 7^{7}
2	(Russia) (Israel)	Elena Likhovtseva; Anna Smashnova	6; 4	6; 0
3	(Russia) (Israel)	Anna Kournikova / Elena Likhovtseva; Tzipora Obziler / Hila Rosen	7^{7} 6^{1}	3; 6	7; 5

==== Sweden vs. Belarus ====
Sweden
1
Bari T.C., Bari, Italy
25 April 1997
Red clay (outdoors)

Belarus
2

			1	2	3
1	(Sweden) (Belarus)	Anna-Karin Svensson; Olga Barabanschikova	5; 7	3; 6
2	(Sweden) (Belarus)	Maria Strandlund; Natasha Zvereva	4; 6	3; 6
3	(Sweden) (Belarus)	Sofia Finér / Annica Lindstedt; Tatiana Ignatieva / Tatiana Poutchek	6; 4	2; 6	7; 5

==== Italy vs. Greece ====
Italy
3
Bari T.C., Bari, Italy
25 April 1997
Red clay (outdoors)

Greece
0

			1	2	3
1	(Italy) (Greece)	Gloria Pizzichini; Christina Zachariadou	6; 0	6; 3
2	(Italy) (Greece)	Silvia Farina; Christína Papadáki	2; 6	6; 3	9; 7
3	(Italy) (Greece)	Giulia Casoni / Francesca Lubiani; Christína Papadáki / Christina Zachariadou	6; 4	7; 5

==== Hungary vs. Slovenia ====
Hungary
2
Bari T.C., Bari, Italy
25 April 1997
Red clay (outdoors)

Slovenia
1

			1	2	3
1	(Hungary) (Slovenia)	Anna Földényi; Tina Križan	6; 4	6; 4
2	(Hungary) (Slovenia)	Katalin Marosi; Barbara Mulej	6; 1	6; 4
3	(Hungary) (Slovenia)	Anna Földényi / Katalin Marosi; Tina Križan / Katarina Srebotnik	1; 6	2; 6

=== Finals ===
==== Russia vs. Belarus ====
Russia
3
Bari T.C., Bari, Italy
26 April 1997
Red clay (outdoors)

Belarus
0

			1	2	3
1	(Russia) (Belarus)	Elena Makarova; Olga Barabanschikova	6; 2	6; 4
2	(Russia) (Belarus)	Elena Likhovtseva; Natasha Zvereva	6; 4	7^{7} 6^{1}
3	(Russia) (Belarus)	Anna Kournikova / Elena Likhovtseva; Olga Barabanschikova / Tatiana Poutchek	6; 3	7; 5

- Russia advanced to the World Group II Play-offs, where they were drawn against South Korea. They won 4–1, and thus proceeded to the 1998 World Group II.

==== Italy vs. Hungary ====
Italy
2
Bari T.C., Bari, Italy
26 April 1997
Red clay (outdoors)

Hungary
1

			1	2	3
1	(Italy) (Hungary)	Francesca Lubiani; Anna Földényi	5; 7	5; 7
2	(Italy) (Hungary)	Gloria Pizzichini; Katalin Marosi	6; 4	6; 1
3	(Italy) (Hungary)	Giulia Casoni / Gloria Pizzichini; Anna Földényi / Katalin Marosi	6; 3	6; 3

- Italy advanced to the World Group II Play-offs, where they were drawn against Indonesia. They won 5–0, and thus proceeded to the 1998 World Group II.

== See also ==
- Fed Cup structure
