= 1997 Fed Cup Europe/Africa Zone Group I – Pool D =

Group D of the 1997 Fed Cup Europe/Africa Zone Group I was one of four pools in the Europe/Africa Zone Group I of the 1997 Fed Cup. Three teams competed in a round robin competition, with the top two teams advancing to the knockout stage.

	(Slovenia) SLO	(Israel) ISR	(Latvia) LAT	(Georgia (country)) GEO	RR; W–L	Set; W–L	Game; W–L	Standings
Slovenia		3–0	3–0	3–0	3–0	18–1	117–56	1
Israel	0–3		2–1	3–0	2–1	11–9	96–86	2
Latvia	0–3	1–2		3–0	1–2	9–10	76–83	3
Georgia	0–3	0–3	0–3		0–3	0–18	44–108	4

== Slovenia vs. Latvia ==
Slovenia
3
Bari T.C., Bari, Italy
22 April 1997
Red clay (outdoors)

Latvia
0

			1	2	3
1	(Slovenia) (Latvia)	Tina Križan; Anna Barinova	6; 4	6; 1
2	(Slovenia) (Latvia)	Barbara Mulej; Larisa Neiland	6; 2	6; 0
3	(Slovenia) (Latvia)	Tina Križan / Katarina Srebotnik; Anna Barinova / Agnese Blumberga	6; 4	6; 2

== Israel vs. Georgia ==
Israel
3
Bari T.C., Bari, Italy
22 April 1997
Red clay (outdoors)

Georgia
0

			1	2	3
1	(Israel) (Georgia (country))	Hila Rosen; Sofia Managadze	6; 3	6; 1
2	(Israel) (Georgia (country))	Anna Smashnova; Nino Louarsabishvili	6; 4	6; 4
3	(Israel) (Georgia (country))	Tzipora Obziler / Hila Rosen; Irina Kakoulia / Nino Louarsabishvili	6; 2	6; 0

== Slovenia vs. Georgia ==
Slovenia
3
Bari T.C., Bari, Italy
23 April 1997
Red clay (outdoors)

Georgia
0

			1	2	3
1	(Slovenia) (Georgia (country))	Tina Križan; Sofia Managadze	6; 4	6; 1
2	(Slovenia) (Georgia (country))	Barbara Mulej; Nino Louarsabishvili	6; 4	6; 1
3	(Slovenia) (Georgia (country))	Tina Križan / Barbara Mulej; Irina Kakoulia / Nino Louarsabishvili	6; 1	6; 2

== Israel vs. Latvia ==
Israel
2
Bari T.C., Bari, Italy
23 April 1997
Red clay (outdoors)

Latvia
1

			1	2	3
1	(Israel) (Latvia)	Hila Rosen; Agnese Blumberga	6; 1	1; 6	6; 2
2	(Israel) (Latvia)	Anna Smashnova; Anna Barinova	6; 4	6; 2
3	(Israel) (Latvia)	Nataly Cahana / Tzipora Obziler; Agnese Blumberga / Larisa Neiland	2; 6	3; 6

== Slovenia vs. Israel ==
Slovenia
3
Bari T.C., Bari, Italy
24 April 1997
Red clay (outdoors)

Israel
0

			1	2	3
1	(Slovenia) (Israel)	Tina Križan; Hila Rosen	7^{7} 6^{4}	6; 3
2	(Slovenia) (Israel)	Barbara Mulej; Anna Smashnova	7; 5	5; 7	8; 6
3	(Slovenia) (Israel)	Tina Križan / Katarina Srebotnik; Nataly Cahana / Tzipora Obziler	6; 3	6; 0

== Latvia vs. Georgia ==
Latvia
3
Bari T.C., Bari, Italy
24 April 1997
Red clay (outdoors)

Georgia
0

			1	2	3
1	(Latvia) (Georgia (country))	Agnese Blumberga; Sofia Managadze	6; 4	6; 1
2	(Latvia) (Georgia (country))	Larisa Neiland; Nino Louarsabishvili	6; 4	6; 1
3	(Latvia) (Georgia (country))	Anna Barinova / Larisa Neiland; Nino Louarsabishvili / Sofia Managadze	6; 1	6; 2

- Georgia failed to win any ties in the pool, and thus was relegated to Group II in 1998, where they placed first in their pool of six, and thus advanced back to Group I for 1999.

== See also ==
- Fed Cup structure
