= 1997 Fed Cup Europe/Africa Zone Group I – Pool B =

Group B of the 1997 Fed Cup Europe/Africa Zone Group I was one of four pools in the Europe/Africa Zone Group I of the 1997 Fed Cup. Three teams competed in a round robin competition, with the top two teams advancing to the knockout stage.

	(Italy) ITA	(Sweden) SWE	(Romania) ROU	(Ukraine) UKR	RR; W–L	Set; W–L	Game; W–L	Standings
Italy		3–0	2–1	3–0	3–0	16–5	117–71	1
Sweden	0–3		3–0	2–1	2–1	13–9	102–102	2
Romania	1–2	0–3		3–0	1–2	10–11	99–94	3
Ukraine	0–3	1–2	0–3		0–3	3–17	62–113	4

== Italy vs. Romania ==
Italy
2
Bari T.C., Bari, Italy
22 April 1997
Red clay (outdoors)

Romania
1

			1	2	3
1	(Italy) (Romania)	Gloria Pizzichini; Alina Tecșor	2; 6	2; 6
2	(Italy) (Romania)	Silvia Farina; Raluca Sandu	3; 6	7^{8} 6^{6}	6; 3
3	(Italy) (Romania)	Giulia Casoni / Silvia Farina; Alice Pirsu / Raluca Sandu	6; 3	6; 1

== Sweden vs. Ukraine ==
Sweden
2
Bari T.C., Bari, Italy
22 April 1997
Red clay (outdoors)

Ukraine
1

			1	2	3
1	(Sweden) (Ukraine)	Anna-Karin Svensson; Natalia Nemchinova	6; 4	6; 1
2	(Sweden) (Ukraine)	Maria Strandlund; Tatiana Kovalchuk	6; 2	4; 6	2; 6
3	(Sweden) (Ukraine)	Maria Strandlund / Anna-Karin Svensson; Tatiana Kovalchuk / Natalia Nemchinova	6; 3	6; 4

== Italy vs. Ukraine ==
Italy
3
Bari T.C., Bari, Italy
23 April 1997
Red clay (outdoors)

Ukraine
0

			1	2	3
1	(Italy) (Ukraine)	Francesca Lubiani; Natalia Nemchinova	6; 2	6; 2
2	(Italy) (Ukraine)	Silvia Farina; Tatiana Kovalchuk	6; 2	6; 4
3	(Italy) (Ukraine)	Giulia Casoni / Gloria Pizzichini; Tatiana Kovalchuk / Natalia Nemchinova	6; 0	6; 3

== Sweden vs. Romania ==
Sweden
3
Bari T.C., Bari, Italy
23 April 1997
Red clay (outdoors)

Romania
0

			1	2	3
1	(Sweden) (Romania)	Anna-Karin Svensson; Alina Tecșor	6; 1	7^{7} 6^{5}
2	(Sweden) (Romania)	Maria Strandlund; Raluca Sandu	7; 5	1; 6	6; 3
3	(Sweden) (Romania)	Sofia Finér / Annica Lindstedt; Raluca Sandu / Alina Tecșor	6; 4	6; 2

== Italy vs. Sweden ==
Italy
3
Bari T.C., Bari, Italy
24 April 1997
Red clay (outdoors)

Sweden
0

			1	2	3
1	(Italy) (Sweden)	Gloria Pizzichini; Anna-Karin Svensson	6^{7} 7^{9}	6; 2	6; 1
2	(Italy) (Sweden)	Silvia Farina; Maria Strandlund	6^{5} 7^{7}	6; 1	6; 1
3	(Italy) (Sweden)	Giulia Casoni / Francesca Lubiani; Sofia Finér / Annica Lindstedt	6; 2	7^{7} 6^{5}

== Romania vs. Ukraine ==
Romania
3
Bari T.C., Bari, Italy
24 April 1997
Red clay (outdoors)

Ukraine
0

			1	2	3
1	(Romania) (Ukraine)	Alina Tecșor; Natalia Nemchinova	6; 4	6; 3
2	(Romania) (Ukraine)	Raluca Sandu; Tatiana Kovalchuk	6; 1	6; 2
3	(Romania) (Ukraine)	Alice Pirsu / Alina Tecșor; Anastasia Ponomarenko / Elena Jirnova	4; 6	7; 5	6; 2

== See also ==
- Fed Cup structure
