= Olga Glouschenko =

Belarusian tennis player

Olga Glouschenko Вольга Глаўшчанка
- Country (sports): Belarus
- Born: 25 January 1978 (age 47) Minsk, Byelorussian SSR, Soviet Union
- Turned pro: 1994
- Retired: 2000
- Prize money: $20,559

Singles
- Career record: 80–63
- Highest ranking: No. 366 (28 October 1996)

Doubles
- Career record: 57–49
- Career titles: 2 ITF
- Highest ranking: No. 220 (26 January 1998)

Team competitions
- Fed Cup: 1–0

Olga Glouschenko (Belarusian: Вольга Глаўшчанка; Russian: Ольга Глущенко; born 25 January 1978) is a Belarusian former professional tennis player.

Playing for Belarus at the Fed Cup, Glouschenko has a win–loss record of 1–0.

== ITF Circuit finals ==
$100,000 tournaments
$75,000 tournaments
$50,000 tournaments
$25,000 tournaments
$10,000 tournaments

=== Singles: 1 (0–1) ===
Outcome	No.	Date	Location	Surface	Opponent	Score
Runner-up	1.	27 October 1997	Minsk, Belarus	Hard (i)	(Belarus) Nadejda Ostrovskaya	6–4, 4–6, 2–6

=== Doubles: 6 (2–4) ===
Outcome	No.	Date	Tournament	Surface	Partner	Opponents	Score
Runner-up	1.	29 January 1996	Ourense, Spain	Hard (i)	(Belarus) Tatiana Poutchek	(Netherlands) Annemarie Mikkers (Netherlands) Henriëtte van Aalderen	1–6, 3–6
Runner-up	2.	28 September 1997	Bucharest, Romania	Clay	(Belarus) Tatiana Poutchek	(Hungary) Virág Csurgó (Slovakia) Janette Husárová	0–6, 0–6
Winner	3.	13 October 1997	Šiauliai, Lithuania	Carpet (i)	(Belarus) Tatiana Poutchek	(Belarus) Nadejda Ostrovskaya (Belarus) Vera Zhukovets	7–5, 6–3
Winner	4.	28 September 1998	Tbilisi, Georgia	Clay	(Belarus) Tatiana Poutchek	(Georgia (country)) Margalita Chakhnashvili (Georgia (country)) Sophia Managadze	6–2, 6–4
Runner-up	5.	1 November 1998	Minsk, Belarus	Clay	(Belarus) Tatiana Poutchek	(Russia) Ekaterina Paniouchkina (Australia) Anastasia Rodionova	5–7, 7–5, 3–6
Runner-up	6.	15 November 1998	Ramat Hasharon, Israel	Hard	(Belarus) Tatiana Poutchek	(Belgium) Kim Clijsters (Belgium) Justine Henin	2–6, 0–6

== Fed Cup participation ==
=== Doubles ===
Edition	Stage	Date	Location	Against	Surface	Partner	Opponents	W/L	Score
1996 Fed Cup; Europe/Africa Zone Group I	P/O	26 April 1996	Murcia, Spain	(Croatia) Croatia	Clay	(Belarus) Olga Barabanschikova	(Croatia) Maja Murić (Croatia) Silvija Talaja	W	1–0 ret.
