= Julie Pullin =

British tennis player

- Country (sports): United Kingdom; England
- Residence: Brighton & Hove, Sussex
- Born: 5 November 1975 (age 50) Cuckfield, Sussex
- Height: 1.73 m (5 ft 8 in)
- Turned pro: 1993
- Retired: 2003
- Plays: Left-handed
- Prize money: $421,976

Singles
- Career record: 302–283
- Career titles: 0 WTA, 8 ITF
- Highest ranking: No. 125 (10 April 2000)

Grand Slam singles results
- Australian Open: 2R (2000)
- Wimbledon: 1R (1994, 1995, 1997, 1998, 1999, 2000, 2001, 2002, 2003)

Doubles
- Career record: 255–183
- Career titles: 27 ITF
- Highest ranking: 67 (2 February 1998)

Grand Slam doubles results
- Australian Open: 2R (1998)
- French Open: 2R (2001)
- Wimbledon: 2R (2000)
- US Open: 1R (1997, 1998, 2000, 2001)

Julie Pullin (born 5 November 1975), now Julie Hobbs, is a retired British tennis player who turned professional in 1993. She won eight singles titles and 25 doubles titles on the ITF circuit, many with compatriot Lorna Woodroffe.

She reached her career-high WTA singles ranking of 125 in April 2000, after she achieved her best performance in a Grand Slam championship, qualifying and reaching the second round of the Australian Open for the first time. Pullin had defeated Slovak 15th seed Martina Suchá in the first round of qualifying 6–4, 7–5, Gloria Pizzichini 6–4, 6–0 in the second and American Samantha Reeves in the final round 6–2, 7–6. She defeated another American, Jane Chi, 6–1, 6–3 in the first round proper, before narrowly losing to Chinese wild card Yi Jing-Qian, 3–6, 6–2, 7–9. It was the only tournament where Pullin won a main-draw Grand Slam match in singles.

She reached the second round of the Wimbledon ladies' doubles tournament once in 2000, with Woodroffe, beating Dawn Buth and Julie Scott 6–4, 6–1, before losing to the 14th seeded Anke Huber and Barbara Schett in the second round.

Julie Pullin announced her retirement in 2003, after playing her last professional singles match in the first round at Wimbledon, losing 1–6, 3–6 to Lina Krasnoroutskaya.

== Personal life ==
Pullin was born in Cuckfield in Sussex to her father Alan and her tennis coach mother Andrea. She has two brothers, Roger and Keith, and a sister, Vicki. She was coached during her career by Leighton Alfred.

Her married name is now Hobbs, and under that name she is now the head coach at the Pavilion and Avenue Tennis Club in Hove.

== WTA career finals ==
=== Doubles: 1 (0–1) ===
Legend
Grand Slam
Tier I
Tier II
Tier III
Tier IV & V

Result	W-L	Date	Tournament	Surface	Partner	Opponents	Score
Loss	0–1	May 1997	Cardiff, UK	Clay	(United Kingdom) Lorna Woodroffe	(Australia) Kerry-Anne Guse (United States) Debbie Graham	3–6, 4–6

== ITF finals ==
=== Singles: 18 (8–10) ===
$100,000 tournaments
$75,000 tournaments
$50,000 tournaments
$25,000 tournaments
$10,000 tournaments

Result	No.	Date	Location	Surface	Opponent	Score
Win	1.	23 March 1992	Harare, Zimbabwe	Hard	(Zimbabwe) Julia Muir	6–1, 6–1
Win	2.	6 April 1992	Gaborone, Botswana	Hard	(South Africa) Estelle Gevers	6–2, 2–6, 6–4
Loss	3.	5 July 1993	Frinton, Great Britain	Grass	(United Kingdom) Lucie Ahl	1–6, 6–3, 1–6
Win	4.	9 August 1993	College Park, United States	Hard	(United States) Vickie Paynter	6–4, 3–6, 6–2
Loss	5.	27 September 1993	Bracknell, Great Britain	Hard	(Russia) Svetlana Parkhomenko	5–7, 2–6
Loss	6.	4 March 1996	Haifa, Israel	Hard	(Israel) Hila Rosen	4–6, 3–6
Loss	7.	4 May 1996	Hatfield, Great Britainm	Clay	(South Africa) Jessica Steck	6–7^{(5–7)}, 6–7^{(3–7)}
Loss	8.	8 July 1996	Easton, United States	Hard	(United States) Stephanie Mabry	3–6, 3–6
Loss	9.	29 September 1996	Telford, Great Britain	Hard (i)	(United Kingdom) Lucie Ahl	3–6, 7–6, 3–6
Win	10.	27 April 1997	Bournemouth, Great Britain	Clay	(United Kingdom) Joanne Ward	6–0, 6–3
Win	11.	14 February 1998	Birmingham, Great Britain	Hard (i)	(United Kingdom) Joanne Ward	6–1, 1–6, 6–3
Win	12.	9 August 1998	Lexington, United States	Hard	(United Kingdom) Abigail Tordoff	6–4, 6–4
Loss	13.	7 November 1999	Hull, Great Britain	Hard (i)	(Republic of Ireland) Yvonne Doyle	4–6, 5–7
Loss	14.	20 February 2000	Redbridge, Great Britain	Hard (i)	(Russia) Elena Bovina	6–2, 0–6, 1–6
Loss	15.	30 October 2000	Hull, Great Britain	Hard	(United Kingdom) Louise Latimer	2–4, 2–4, 1–4
Loss	16.	19 February 2001	Algarve, Portugal	Hard	(Russia) Ekaterina Kozhokina	4–6, 6–4, 3–6
Win	17.	9 October 2001	Cardiff, Great Britain	Carpet (i)	(Denmark) Eva Dyrberg	6–1, 6–7^{(1–7)}, 6–2
Win	18.	5 May 2002	Gifu, Japan	Hard	(Japan) Shinobu Asagoe	4–6, 6–4, 6–3

=== Doubles: 46 (27–19) ===
Result	No.	Date	Location	Surface	Partner	Opponents	Score
Win	1.	10 February 1992	Swindon, Great Britain	Carpet	(United Kingdom) Lorna Woodroffe	(United States) Jacqueline Geller (United States) Tina Samara	6–4, 6–4
Loss	2.	4 May 1992	Lee-on-the-Solent, Great Britain	Clay	(United Kingdom) Lorna Woodroffe	(United Kingdom) Alison Smith (United Kingdom) Tamsin Wainwright	1–6, 4–6
Loss	3.	25 October 1993	Jakarta, Indonesia	Hard	(Australia) Robyn Mawdsley	(Japan) Ei Iida (Japan) Nana Smith	4–6, 5–7
Win	4.	5 February 1996	Sunderland, Great Britain	Hard	(United Kingdom) Lorna Woodroffe	(Australia) Melissa Beadman (Estonia) Helen Laupa	6–4, 7–5
Loss	5.	18 February 1996	Sheffield, Great Britain	Hard (i)	(United Kingdom) Lorna Woodroffe	(United Kingdom) Lucie Ahl (United Kingdom) Joanne Ward	6–7, 3–6
Win	6.	4 March 1996	Haifa, Israel	Hard	(United Kingdom) Kate Warne-Holland	(Israel) Hila Rosen (Israel) Shiri Burstein	6–2, 6–4
Loss	7.	22 April 1996	Edinburgh, Great Britain	Clay	(United Kingdom) Lorna Woodroffe	(United Kingdom) Helen Crook (United Kingdom) Victoria Davies	2–6, 0–6
Win	8.	29 September 1996	Telford, Great Britain	Hard (i)	(United Kingdom) Lorna Woodroffe	(Russia) Natalia Egorova (Netherlands) Henriëtte van Aalderen	6–2, 7–6^{(7–4)}
Win	9.	6 October 1996	Nottingham, Great Britain	Hard (i)	(United Kingdom) Lorna Woodroffe	(United Kingdom) Emily Bond (United Kingdom) Ekaterina Roubanova	6–2, 6–4
Win	10.	28 October 1996	Edinburgh, Great Britain	Hard	(United Kingdom) Lorna Woodroffe	(Dominican Republic) Joelle Schad (Germany) Syna Schmidle	6–3, 6–4
Win	11.	16 February 1997	Birmingham, Great Britain	Hard	(United Kingdom) Lorna Woodroffe	(United Kingdom) Shirli-Ann Siddall (United Kingdom) Amanda Wainwright	6–2, 6–4
Win	12.	23 February 1997	Redbridge, Great Britain	Hard (i)	(United Kingdom) Lorna Woodroffe	(Australia) Kerry-Anne Guse (United Kingdom) Clare Wood	2–6, 6–4, 6–4
Loss	13.	7 April 1997	Hvar, Croatia	Clay	(United Kingdom) Amanda Wainwright	(Slovakia) Patrícia Marková (Slovakia) Zuzana Váleková	6–7^{(3–7)}, 4–6
Loss	14.	27 April 1997	Bournemouth, Great Britain	Clay	(United Kingdom) Lorna Woodroffe	(United Kingdom) Amanda Wainwright (United Kingdom) Shirli-Ann Siddall	3–6, 5–7
Win	15.	14 July 1997	Clearwater, United States	Hard (i)	(United Kingdom) Amanda Wainwright	(Canada) Maureen Drake (United States) Lindsay Lee-Waters	6–4, 6–4
Loss	16.	27 July 1997	Peachtree City, United States	Hard	(United Kingdom) Amanda Wainwright	(Canada) Sonya Jeyaseelan (Japan) Kaoru Shibata	4–6, 1–6
Win	17.	19 October 1997	Southampton, Great Britain	Carpet (i)	(United Kingdom) Lorna Woodroffe	(Czech Republic) Lenka Cenková (Federal Republic of Yugoslavia) Sandra Načuk	6–2, 6–1
Win	18.	2 November 1997	Edinburgh, Great Britain	Hard (i)	(United Kingdom) Lorna Woodroffe	(Netherlands) Amanda Hopmans (Netherlands) Seda Noorlander	6–3, 6–1
Win	19.	26 July 1998	Peachtree City, United States	Hard	(United Kingdom) Lorna Woodroffe	(Canada) Vanessa Webb (United States) Keri Phebus	3–6, 6–2, 6–4
Loss	20.	2 August 1998	Winnipeg, Canada	Hard	(Canada) Renata Kolbovic	(Canada) Vanessa Webb (United States) Keri Phebus	6–4, 4–6, 6–7
Win	21.	23 August 1998	The Bronx, United States	Hard	(United Kingdom) Lorna Woodroffe	(Greece) Christína Papadáki (France) Sarah Pitkowski-Malcor	6–3, 6–1
Win	22.	5 June 1999	Surbiton, Great Britain	Grass	(United Kingdom) Lorna Woodroffe	(Japan) Rika Hiraki (United States) Linda Wild	w/o
Loss	23.	9 August 1999	Lexington, United States	Hard	(South Korea) Kim Eun-ha	(France) Alexandra Fusai (Argentina) Florencia Labat	4–6, 1–6
Win	24.	18 October 1999	Southampton, Great Britain	Carpet (i)	(United Kingdom) Lorna Woodroffe	(Romania) Magda Mihalache (Slovakia) Zuzana Váleková	6–3, 6–2
Win	25.	7 November 1999	Hull, Great Britain	Hard (i)	(United Kingdom) Lorna Woodroffe	(Czech Republic) Michaela Paštiková (Germany) Jasmin Wöhr	6–4, 6–3
Loss	26.	20 February 2000	Redbridge, Great Britain	Hard (i)	(United Kingdom) Lorna Woodroffe	(France) Alexandra Fusai (Slovenia) Tina Križan	6–7^{(4–7)}, 6–3, 6–7^{(1–7)}
Loss	27.	21 February 2000	Bushey, Great Britain	Carpet (i)	(United Kingdom) Lorna Woodroffe	(Australia) Annabel Ellwood (Belarus) Nadejda Ostrovskaya	1–6, 1–6
Win	28.	6 March 2000	Haikou, China	Hard	(Germany) Gréta Arn	(South Korea) Chae Kyung-yee (Japan) Ryoko Takemura	7–5, 6–4
Win	29.	22 October 2000	Cardiff, Great Britain	Carpet (i)	(United Kingdom) Lorna Woodroffe	(Italy) Giulia Casoni (Belgium) Laurence Courtois	0–6, 6–1, 6–3
Win	30.	30 October 2000	Hull, Great Britain	Hard (i)	(United Kingdom) Lorna Woodroffe	(Germany) Mia Buric (Germany) Syna Schmidle	4–1, 1–4, 4–1, 5–4(4)
Win	31.	11 February 2001	Redbridge, Great Britain	Hard (i)	(United Kingdom) Lorna Woodroffe	(Kazakhstan) Irina Selyutina (Slovenia) Tina Križan	6–1, 6–3
Loss	32.	19 February 2001	Algarve, Portugal	Hard	(United Kingdom) Alice Barnes	(France) Carine Bornu (Switzerland) Aliénor Tricerri	3–6, 3–6
Win	33.	25 March 2001	La Cañada, United States	Hard	(United Kingdom) Lorna Woodroffe	(Japan) Rika Hiraki (South Korea) Kim Eun-ha	6–2, 6–4
Loss	34.	6 May 2001	Gifu, Japan	Hard	(United Kingdom) Lorna Woodroffe	(Indonesia) Wynne Prakusya (South Korea) Kim Eun-ha	6–1, 4–6, 6–7^{(2–7)}
Loss	35.	13 May 2001	Fukuoka, Japan	Hard	(United Kingdom) Lorna Woodroffe	(Japan) Rika Hiraki (United States) Nana Smith	0–6, 6–7^{(3–7)}
Win	36.	20 May 2001	Edinburgh, Great Britain	Clay	(United Kingdom) Lorna Woodroffe	(United Kingdom) Helen Crook (United Kingdom) Victoria Davies	6–2, 6–1
Win	37.	4 June 2001	Surbiton, Great Britain	Grass	(United Kingdom) Lorna Woodroffe	(South Africa) Kim Grant (United States) Lilia Osterloh	7–6^{(7–3)}, 7–5
Win	38.	15 July 2001	Felixstowe, Great Britain	Grass	(Australia) Trudi Musgrave	(South Africa) Natalie Grandin (South Africa) Kim Grant	7–5, 6–4
Loss	39.	29 July 2001	Pamplona, Spain	Clay	(Australia) Trudi Musgrave	(Italy) Giulia Casoni (Italy) Roberta Vinci	6–7^{(2–7)}, 4–6
Win	40.	5 August 2001	Alghero, Italy	Hard	(Australia) Trudi Musgrave	(Estonia) Maret Ani (Brazil) Joana Cortez	6–4, 7–5
Loss	41.	16 September 2001	Peachtree City, United States	Hard	(Australia) Trudi Musgrave	(United States) Allison Bradshaw (United States) Jennifer Russell	6–7^{(1–7)}, 2–6
Loss	42.	19 March 2002	La Cañada, United States	Hard	(United Kingdom) Lorna Woodroffe	(South Africa) Kim Grant (United States) Abigail Spears	6–4, 5–7, 1–6
Loss	43.	12 May 2002	Fukuoka, Japan	Hard	(United Kingdom) Lorna Woodroffe	(Japan) Shinobu Asagoe (South Korea) Cho Yoon-jeong	2–6, 4–6
Win	44.	9 June 2002	Surbiton, Great Britain	Grass	(United Kingdom) Lorna Woodroffe	(South Africa) Nannie de Villiers (Kazakhstan) Irina Selyutina	6–2, 6–2
Loss	45.	8 October 2002	Cardiff, Great Britain	Hard (i)	(Argentina) Mariana Díaz Oliva	(France) Marion Bartoli (Canada) Vanessa Webb	4–6, 2–6
Win	46.	17 November 2002	Port Pirie, Australia	Hard	(Australia) Trudi Musgrave	(United States) Amanda Augustus (United States) Gabriela Lastra	7–6^{(7–1)}, 6–2

Preceded by Louise Latimer; Lucie Ahl; Lucie Ahl	British Tennis number one 10 April 2000 – 16 April 2000; 6 August 2001 – 17 March 2002; 6 May 2002 – 22 September 2002	Succeeded by Louise Latimer; Lucie Ahl; Elena Baltacha
