= Amanda Hopmans =

Dutch tennis player

- Country (sports): Netherlands
- Born: 11 February 1976 (age 49) Goirle, Netherlands
- Height: 1.67 m (5 ft 5 1/2 in)
- Turned pro: 1994
- Retired: 2003
- Plays: Right-handed
- Prize money: $331,012

Singles
- Career record: 223–162
- Career titles: 0 WTA, 8 ITF
- Highest ranking: No. 72 (1 November 1999)

Grand Slam singles results
- Australian Open: 1R (2000, 2001)
- French Open: 1R (1999, 2000, 2001)
- Wimbledon: 2R (1999)
- US Open: 2R (1999)

Doubles
- Career record: 129–90
- Career titles: 0 WTA, 11 ITF
- Highest ranking: No. 88 (25 September 2000)

Grand Slam doubles results
- Australian Open: 1R (1999, 2000, 2001)
- French Open: 1R (2000, 2002)
- Wimbledon: 1R (2000)
- US Open: 2R (2000)

Team competitions
- Fed Cup: 13–7

Amanda Hopmans (born 11 February 1976) is a former professional tennis player from the Netherlands. She turned professional in February 1994, and on 1 November 1999, she achieved her career-high ranking of world No. 72.

Her biggest career result was in 2000, when she reached her only WTA Tour final at the J&S Cup, held in Warsaw. In the final, she lost to Henrieta Nagyová in three sets.

Hopmans retired from tennis in 2003.

== WTA career finals ==
Legend
Tier I
Tier II
Tier III
Tier IV & V

=== Singles: 1 (runner-up) ===
Result	No.	Date	Tournament	Surface	Opponent	Score
Loss	1.	May 2000	Warsaw Open, Poland	Clay	(Slovakia) Henrieta Nagyová	6–2, 4–6, 5–7

=== Doubles: 1 (runner-up) ===
Result	No.	Date	Tournament	Surface	Partner	Opponents	Score
Loss	1.	Apr 2000	Estoril Open, Portugal	Clay	(Spain) Cristina Torrens Valero	(Slovenia) Tina Križan (Slovenia) Katarina Srebotnik	0–6, 6–7^{(9–11)}

== ITF Circuit finals ==
$100,000 tournaments
$75,000 tournaments
$50,000 tournaments
$25,000 tournaments
$10,000 tournaments

=== Singles: 11 (8–3) ===
Result	No.	Date	Tournament	Surface	Opponent	Score
Win	1.	17 July 1995	ITF Frinton-on-Sea, United Kingdom	Grass	(Russia) Julia Lutrova	6–2, 7–6^{(7–1)}
Loss	2.	17 September 1995	Umag, Croatia	Clay	(Czech Republic) Sylva Nesvadbová	3–6, 4–6
Win	3.	10 October 1995	Telford, United Kingdom	Hard (i)	(United Kingdom) Claire Taylor	6–4, 6–3
Win	4.	22 September 1997	Bucharest, Romania	Clay	(Germany) Sandra Klösel	4–6, 6–2, 7–5
Win	5.	11 October 1998	Batumi, Georgia	Carpet	(Russia) Anastasia Myskina	6–2, 7–5
Loss	6.	5 December 1998	New Delhi, India	Hard	(Italy) Tathiana Garbin	3–6, 2–6
Win	7.	11 October 1999	Rhodes, Greece	Clay	(Hungary) Anna Földényi	6–3, 6–0
Loss	8.	1 July 2001	Båstad, Sweden	Clay	(Serbia and Montenegro) Ana Timotić	6–3, 3–6, 0–6
Win	9.	6 August 2001	Hechingen, Germany	Clay	(Serbia and Montenegro) Katarina Mišić	7–5, 6–1
Win	10.	9 March 2003	Cairo, Egypt	Clay	(Portugal) Frederica Piedade	7–6, 6–4
Win	11.	16 March 2003	Cairo, Egypt	Clay	(Netherlands) Mariëlle Hoogland	6–1, 4–6, 6–4

=== Doubles: 22 (11–11) ===
Result	No.	Date	Tournament	Surface	Partner	Opponents	Score
Win	1.	3 April 1994	ITF Gaborone, Botswana	Hard	(Spain) Magüi Serna	(Austria) Evelyn Fauth (Czech Republic) Radka Surova	6–3, 6–1
Win	2.	17 July 1994	Olsztyn, Poland	Clay	(Netherlands) Mariëlle Bruens	(United States) Corina Morariu (Slovakia) Henrieta Nagyová	6–4, 5–7, 7–5
Loss	3.	28 August 1994	Istanbul, Turkey	Hard	(Romania) Maria Popescu	(Indonesia) Natalia Soetrisno (Indonesia) Suzanna Wibowo	6–7, 4–6
Loss	4.	17 October 1994	Langenthal, Switzerland	Carpet (i)	(Netherlands) Henriëtte van Aalderen	(Israel) Shiri Burstein (Israel) Hila Rosen	5–7, 4–6
Loss	5.	22 May 1995	Ratzeburg, Germany	Clay	(Russia) Anna Linkova	(Israel) Nelly Barkan (Germany) Claudia Timm	2–6, 1–6
Loss	6.	7 July 1996	Vaihingen, Germany	Clay	(Netherlands) Seda Noorlander	(Czech Republic) Lenka Cenková (Czech Republic) Adriana Gerši	6–2, 3–6, ret.
Loss	7.	6 October 1996	Lerida, Spain	Clay	(Belgium) Patty Van Acker	(Germany) Kirstin Freye (Austria) Barbara Schwartz	2–6, 1–6
Win	8.	26 May 1997	Barcelona, Spain	Clay	(Netherlands) Kim de Weille	(Hungary) Katalin Marosi (Argentina) Veronica Stele	6–4, 5–7, 6–4
Win	9.	14 July 1997	Getxo, Spain	Clay	(Belgium) Patty Van Acker	(Spain) Alicia Ortuño (Israel) Hila Rosen	7–5, 4–6, 7–5
Loss	10.	2 November 1997	Edinburgh, United Kingdom	Hard (i)	(Netherlands) Seda Noorlander	(United Kingdom) Julie Pullin (United Kingdom) Lorna Woodroffe	3–6, 1–6
Win	11.	22 March 1998	Reims, France	Clay	(Belgium) Daphne van de Zande	(Spain) Eva Bes (Spain) Conchita Martínez Granados	6–4, 6–3
Win	12.	27 July 1998	Pamplona, Spain	Hard (i)	(Spain) Eva Bes	(Germany) Meike Fröhlich (Tunisia) Selima Sfar	w/o
Loss	13.	14 September 1998	Bordeaux, France	Carpet	(Germany) Sandra Klösel	(Hungary) Anna Foldenyi (Hungary) Rita Kuti-Kis	2–6, 3–6
Loss	14.	5 October 1998	Batumi, Georgia	Hard	(Austria) Melanie Schnell	(Russia) Evgenia Kulikovskaya (Russia) Ekaterina Sysoeva	4–6, 6–3, 0–6
Win	15.	5 December 1998	New Delhi, India	Hard	(Czech Republic) Lenka Cenková	(Slovenia) Tina Križan (Austria) Karin Kschwendt	w/o
Win	16.	11 October 1999	Rhodes, Greece	Clay	(Italy) Tathiana Garbin	(Czech Republic) Lenka Cenková (Spain) Alicia Ortuño	4–6, 6–0, 7–6^{(7–3)}
Loss	17.	12 February 2001	Sutton, United Kingdom	Hard (i)	(Belgium) Patty Van Acker	(Greece) Eleni Daniilidou (Germany) Lydia Steinbach	0–6, 4–6
Loss	18.	14 October 2001	Poitiers, France	Hard (i)	(Bulgaria) Lubomira Bacheva	(Netherlands) Kristie Boogert (Belgium) Laurence Courtois	1–6, 5–7
Loss	19.	27 January 2002	Fullerton, United States	Hard	(Italy) Giulia Casoni	(United States) Melissa Middleton (United States) Brie Rippner	6–2, 4–6, 5–7
Win	20.	3 February 2002	ITF Rockford, United States	Hard (i)	(Italy) Giulia Casoni	(United States) Melissa Middleton (United States) Brie Rippner	6–4, ret.
Win	21.	15 October 2002	ITF Southampton, United Kingdom	Hard (i)	(Serbia and Montenegro) Dragana Zarić	(Latvia) Līga Dekmeijere (Republic of Ireland) Yvonne Doyle	6–2, 6–1
Win	22.	16 March 2003	ITF Cairo, Egypt	Clay	(Netherlands) Mariëlle Hoogland	(Austria) Susanne Filipp (Slovakia) Andrea Masaryková	7–5, 6–4
