= Nelly Barkan =

Israeli tennis player

- Native name: נלי ברקן
- Country (sports): Soviet Union; Israel
- Born: November 18, 1973 (age 52)
- Turned pro: 1991
- Retired: 1997
- Plays: Right-handed (two-handed backhand)
- Prize money: $32,819

Singles
- Career record: 122–69
- Career titles: 0 WTA, 5 ITF
- Highest ranking: No. 304 (July 24, 1995)

Doubles
- Career record: 81–46
- Career titles: 0 WTA, 10 ITF
- Highest ranking: No. 220 (October 7, 1995)

Nelly Barkan (Hebrew: נלי ברקן; born 18 November 1973) is an Israeli former professional tennis player.

Barkan made her WTA main draw debut at the 1993 Citizen Cup in the doubles event partnering Olga Lugina.

== ITF Circuit finals ==
=== Singles: 7 (5–2) ===
Legend
$100,000 tournaments
$75,000 tournaments
$50,000 tournaments
$25,000 tournaments
$10,000 tournaments

Result	No.	Date	Tournament	Surface	Opponent	Score
Loss	1.	2 September 1991	Burgas, Bulgaria	Hard	(Soviet Union) Irina Sukhova	3–6, 6–2, 3–6
Win	2.	16 August 1992	Rebecq, Belgium	Clay	(Commonwealth of Independent States) Elena Likhovtseva	6–3, 6–0
Loss	3.	27 June 1994	Velp, Netherlands	Clay	(Czech Republic) Veronika Šafářová	4–6, 5–7
Win	4.	3 April 1995	Tiberias, Israel	Hard	(Belarus) Jana Sokolenko	6–4, 6–3
Win	5.	29 May 1995	Jaffa, Israel	Hard	(Israel) Shiri Burstein	4–6, 6–3, 6–1
Win	6.	5 June 1995	Haifa, Israel	Hard	(Israel) Tzipora Obziler	6–2, 6–2
Win	7.	26 June 1995	Velp, Netherlands	Clay	(Czech Republic) Jana Ondrouchová	6–0, 7–6^{(5)}

=== Doubles: 16 (10–6) ===
Legend
$100,000 tournaments
$75,000 tournaments
$50,000 tournaments
$25,000 tournaments
$10,000 tournaments

Result	No.	Date	Tournament	Surface	Partner	Opponents	Score
Win	1.	29 July 1991	A Coruña, Spain	Clay	(Soviet Union) Olga Lugina	(Netherlands) Hanneke Ketelaars (Greece) Christina Zachariadou	7–6^{(4)}, 6–3
Loss	2.	25 August 1991	Koksijde, Belgium	Clay	(Soviet Union) Olga Lugina	(Belgium) Laurence Courtois (Belgium) Nancy Feber	6–4, 0–6, 4–6
Win	3.	14 October 1991	Burgdorf, Switzerland	Carpet	(Soviet Union) Olga Lugina	(Switzerland) Michèle Strebel (Switzerland) Natalie Tschan	6–4, 1–6, 6–4
Loss	4.	10 August 1992	Rebecq, Belgium	Clay	(Commonwealth of Independent States) Maria Marfina	(Bulgaria) Svetlana Krivencheva (Commonwealth of Independent States) Elena Likhovtseva	5–7, 2–6
Loss	5.	7 September 1992	Varna, Bulgaria	Clay	(Commonwealth of Independent States) Aida Khalatian	(Commonwealth of Independent States) Maria Marfina (Commonwealth of Independent States) Karina Kuregian	4–6, 4–6
Win	6.	19 October 1992	Lyss, Switzerland	Hard (i)	(Bulgaria) Svetlana Krivencheva	(Netherlands) Gaby Coorengel (Netherlands) Amy van Buuren	7–6^{(7–4)}, 3–6, 6–4
Win	7.	24 May 1993	Ramat HaSharon, Israel	Hard	(Ukraine) Tessa Shapovalova	(Bulgaria) Galia Angelova (Bulgaria) Teodora Nedeva	6–2, 7–6^{(5)}
Win	8.	9 August 1993	Rebecq, Belgium	Clay	(Ukraine) Olga Lugina	(Argentina) Mariana Diaz-Oliva (Argentina) Valentina Solari	6–1, 7–6^{(1)}
Loss	9.	22 May 1994	Ratzeburg, Germany	Clay	(Moldova) Svetlana Komleva	(Paraguay) Magalí Benítez (Ecuador) María Dolores Campana	6–3, 5–7, 6–7^{(6)}
Win	10.	20 June 1994	Staré Splavy, Czech Republic	Clay	(Netherlands) Martine Vosseberg	(Czech Republic) Martina Hautová (Czech Republic) Monika Kratochvílová	6–4, 6–3
Win	11.	3 April 1995	Tiberias, Israel	Hard	(Ukraine) Tessa Shapovalova	(Israel) Nataly Cahana (Israel) Oshri Shashua	6–4, 6–1
Win	12.	22 May 1995	Ratzeburg, Germany	Clay	(Germany) Claudia Timm	(Netherlands) Amanda Hopmans (Russia) Anna Linkova	6–2, 6–1
Win	13.	29 May 1995	Jaffa, Israel	Hard	(Ukraine) Tessa Shapovalova	(Israel) Limor Gabai (Israel) Pamela Zingman	6–4, 6–3
Win	14.	5 June 1995	Haifa, Israel	Hard	(Ukraine) Tessa Shapovalova	(Israel) Limor Gabai (Israel) Pamela Zingman	6–4, 6–4
Loss	15.	26 June 1995	Velp, Netherlands	Clay	(Russia) Anna Linkova	(Netherlands) Henriëtte van Aalderen (Netherlands) Stephanie Gomperts	1–6, 0–6
Loss	16.	24 June 1996	Velp, Netherlands	Clay	(Netherlands) Martine Vosseberg	(Netherlands) Mariëlle Bruens (Netherlands) Debby Haak	6–3, 4–6, 2–6
