= Tessa Shapovalova =

Ukrainian tennis player and coach

- Country (sports): Soviet Union; CIS; Ukraine
- Residence: Vaughan, Ontario Canada
- Born: 14 March 1969 (age 57) Lviv, Ukrainian SSR
- Plays: Left
- Prize money: $9,633

Singles
- Career record: 31–31
- Highest ranking: No. 445 (23 March 1992)

Doubles
- Career record: 33–20
- Career titles: 4 ITF
- Highest ranking: No. 301 (4 December 1995)

Coaching career (2010-Present)
- Denis Shapovalov (2016-2021) Tennis Academy 2010-Present

Coaching achievements
- Coachee singles titles total: 1

Tessa Shapovalova (Hebrew: טסה שפובלובה; Russian: Тесса Шаповалова born 14 March 1969) is an Israeli tennis coach and former professional player.

Shapovalova is the mother of pro tennis player Denis Shapovalov.

Shapovalova was born in Lviv, Ukraine, then part of the Soviet Union. She was on the Soviet national tennis team, but moved to Tel Aviv with Denis' father (Viktor Shapovalov) when the Soviet Union was collapsing. She eventually became a tennis coach there. She is Jewish.

Shapovalova has two children, Evgeniy and Denis, born in Israel. The family moved from Israel to Canada before Denis's first birthday.

She got a job as a tennis coach at the Richmond Hill Country Club where Denis Shapovalov started to play. Eventually, Denis couldn't get enough court time, so his mother left her job and opened a tennis academy in Vaughan called Tessa Tennis. Tessa is still coaching at her academy while Denis lives in the Bahamas. She traveled with her son as his coach for a number of years even though they hired former world no. 8 Mikhail Youzhny as Shapovalov's coach. Before she retired from travel with her son in 2021. Until in 2021 when she retired as being Denis’ full time travel coach. In 2025 she transferred ownership of her academy in Concord Vaughan to long time academy coach Vitaly Gorin, this transfer renamed the academy to Concord Tennis Academy. However, she still works with her students at the academy nearly everyday.

== Career finals ==
=== Singles Finals (0–1) ===
Outcome	No.	Date	Tournament	Surface	Opponent	Score
Runner-up	1.	29 July 1991	Haifa, Israel	Hard	(South Africa) Tessa Price	2–6, 0–6

=== Doubles Finals (4–1) ===
Outcome	No.	Date	Tournament	Surface	Partner	Opponents	Score
Winner	1.	24 May 1993	Ramat HaSharon, Israel	Hard	(Israel) Nelly Barkan	(Bulgaria) Galia Angelova (Bulgaria) Teodora Nedeva	6–2, 7–6^{(5)}
Winner	2.	3 April 1995	Tiberias, Israel	Hard	(Israel) Nelly Barkan	(Israel) Nataly Cahana (Israel) Oshri Shashua	6–4, 6–1
Winner	3.	29 May 1995	Jaffa, Israel	Hard	(Israel) Nelly Barkan	(Israel) Limor Gabai (Israel) Pamela Zingman	6–4, 6–3
Winner	4.	5 June 1995	Haifa, Israel	Hard	(Israel) Nelly Barkan	(Israel) Limor Gabai (Israel) Pamela Zingman	6–4, 6–4
Runner-up	5.	20 November 1995	Cairo, Egypt	Clay	(France) Kildine Chevalier	(Bulgaria) Teodora Nedeva (Bulgaria) Antoaneta Pandjerova	7–5, 3–6, 0–6
