= Henriëtte van Aalderen =

Dutch tennis player

- Full name: Henriëtte van Aalderen-Sprée
- Country (sports): Netherlands
- Born: 14 April 1976 (age 48); Amsterdam, Netherlands
- Prize money: $23,297

Singles
- Career record: 75–52
- Career titles: 3 ITF
- Highest ranking: No. 365 (12 January 1998)

Doubles
- Career record: 89–41
- Career titles: 12 ITF
- Highest ranking: No. 212 (29 April 1996)

Henriëtte van Aalderen-Sprée (born 14 April 1976) is a Dutch former professional tennis player.

Born in Amsterdam, Van Aalderen competed in professional tournaments during the 1990s. She won three ITF singles titles and 12 ITF doubles titles. Her only WTA Tour main-draw appearance came in the doubles at Rosmalen in 1996, partnering Annemarie Mikkers.

== ITF Circuit finals ==
$25,000 tournaments
$10,000 tournaments

=== Singles (3–1) ===
Result	No.	Date	Location	Surface	Opponent	Score
Loss	1.	2 August 1994	Burgas, Bulgaria	Hard	(Bulgaria) Pavlina Nola	5–7, 0–6
Win	1.	16 January 1995	Ourense, Spain	Hard (i)	(Netherlands) Stephanie Gomperts	4–6, 6–2, 7–6
Win	2.	21 January 1996	Pontevedra, Spain	Hard (i)	(Italy) Alessia Lombardi	7–5, 6–3
Win	3.	19 January 1997	Pontevedra, Spain	Hard (i)	(Spain) Lourdes Domínguez Lino	6–4, 6–2

=== Doubles (12–6) ===
Result	No.	Date	Location	Surface	Partner	Opponents	Score
Win	1.	24 January 1994	Pontevedra, Spain	Carpet (i)	(Slovakia) Patrícia Marková	(Spain) Marta Cano (Spain) Cristina De Subijana	6–3, 6–2
Win	2.	27 June 1994	Velp, Netherlands	Clay	(Netherlands) Nancy van Erp	(Italy) Ginevra Mugnaini (Italy) Alessia Sciarpelletti	6–2, 7–5
Win	3.	8 August 1994	Rebecq, Belgium	Clay	(Spain) Elisa Peñalvo López	(Netherlands) Stephanie Gomperts (Netherlands) Sandra van der Aa	0–6, 7–6^{(3)}, 6–2
Loss	1.	26 September 1994	Burgas, Bulgaria	Clay	(Slovakia) Patrícia Marková	(Bulgaria) Antoaneta Pandjerova (Bulgaria) Teodora Nedeva	6–2, 4–6, 0–6
Loss	2.	17 October 1994	Langenthal, Switzerland	Carpet (i)	(Netherlands) Amanda Hopmans	(Israel) Shiri Burstein (Israel) Hila Rosen	5–7, 4–6
Win	4.	16 January 1995	Ourense, Spain	Hard (i)	(Netherlands) Stephanie Gomperts	(Spain) Paula Hermida (Belarus) Olga Barabanschikova	7–5, 6–1
Loss	3.	12 June 1995	Bossonnens, Switzerland	Clay	(Netherlands) Stephanie Gomperts	(Netherlands) Debby Haak (Belgium) Patty Van Acker	7–6, 3–6, 5–7
Win	5.	19 June 1995	Cureglia, Switzerland	Clay	(Netherlands) Stephanie Gomperts	(Germany) Sabine Haas (Denmark) Sandra Olsen	7–5, 6–3
Win	6.	26 June 1995	Velp, Netherlands	Clay	(Netherlands) Stephanie Gomperts	(Russia) Anna Linkova (Israel) Nelly Barkan	6–1, 6–0
Win	7.	30 October 1995	Nicosia, Cyprus	Clay	(Netherlands) Vanessa Brilleman	(Israel) Nataly Cahana (Israel) Oshri Shashua	3–6, 7–6^{(2)}, 6–4
Win	8.	20 January 1996	Pontevedra, Spain	Hard (i)	(Netherlands) Annemarie Mikkers	(France) Laurence Bois (Italy) Emanuela Brusati	6–2, 6–2
Win	9.	29 January 1996	Ourense, Spain	Hard (i)	(Netherlands) Annemarie Mikkers	(Belarus) Olga Glouschenko (Belarus) Tatiana Poutchek	6–1, 6–3
Win	10.	10 August 1996	Rebecq, Belgium	Clay	(Netherlands) Carlijn Buis	(United States) Meredith Geiger (Australia) Kylie Moulds	6–0, 6–2
Loss	4.	29 September 1996	Telford, Great Britain	Hard (i)	(Russia) Natalia Egorova	(United Kingdom) Julie Pullin (United Kingdom) Lorna Woodroffe	2–6, 6–7
Win	11.	8 March 1997	Tel Aviv, Israel	Hard	(Netherlands) Andrea van den Hurk	(Czech Republic) Milena Nekvapilová (Czech Republic) Hana Šromová	0–6, 6–3, 6–4
Loss	5.	31 August 1997	Orbetello, Italy	Clay	(Netherlands) Kim de Weille	(Czech Republic) Kateřina Kroupová-Šišková (Germany) Silke Meier	3–6, 6–2, 2–6
Loss	6.	14 February 1998	Birmingham, Great Britain	Hard (i)	(Netherlands) Andrea van den Hurk	(Germany) Kirstin Freye (United States) Jean Okada	4–6, 4–6
Win	12.	5 July 1998	Alkmaar, Netherlands	Clay	(Netherlands) Yvette Basting	(Netherlands) Carlijn Buis (Netherlands) Andrea van den Hurk	6–0, 6–1
—	–	12 July 1998	Amersfoort, Netherlands	Clay	(Netherlands) Yvette Basting	(Colombia) Giana Gutiérrez (Netherlands) Debby Haak	DNP
