= Monika Maštalířová =

Czech tennis player

- Country (sports): Czech Republic
- Born: 22 January 1977 (age 48)
- Plays: Right-handed
- Prize money: $31,017

Singles
- Career titles: 1 ITF
- Highest ranking: No. 412 (1 August 1994)

Doubles
- Career titles: 10 ITF
- Highest ranking: No. 178 (18 May 1998)

Monika Maštalířová (born 22 January 1977) is a Czech former professional tennis player.

Maštalířová reached a career high singles ranking of 412, competing in ITF Circuit tournaments, with all of her WTA Tour main draw appearances coming in doubles. She won 10 ITF doubles titles during her career.

From 2001 to 2004, Maštalířová played college tennis at Lynn University in Boca Raton, Florida. She was a member of Lynn's 2001 NCAA Division II Championship winning team and in 2003 was named SSC Player of the Year.

== ITF finals ==
$25,000 tournaments
$10,000 tournaments

=== Singles: 4 (1–3) ===
Result	No.	Date	Tournament	Surface	Opponent	Score
Loss	1.	7 June 1993	Plovdiv, Bulgaria	Clay	(Argentina) Laura Montalvo	0–6, 4–6, 4–6
Win	1.	30 May 1994	Plovdiv, Bulgaria	Clay	(Bulgaria) Dora Djilianova	6–2, 6–4
Loss	2.	12 June 1994	Burgas, Bulgaria	Clay	(France) Caroline Dhenin	6–1, 0–6, 6–7^{(7–4)}
Loss	3.	12 June 1995	Bytom, Poland	Clay	(Russia) Evgenia Kulikovskaya	4–6, 2–6

=== Doubles: 18 (10–8) ===
Result	No.	Date	Tournament	Surface	Partner	Opponents	Score
Loss	1.	12 June 1994	Burgas, Bulgaria	Clay	(Bulgaria) Angelina Petrova	(France) Caroline Dhenin (Federal Republic of Yugoslavia) Natalja Vojnović	4–6, 7–6^{(7–5)}, 6–7^{(4–7)}
Win	1.	15 May 1995	Prešov, Slovakia	Clay	(Czech Republic) Eva Erbová	(Slovakia) Katarina Valkyova (Poland) Anna Bielen-Zarska	6–3, 7–5
Win	2.	17 July 1995	Toruń, Poland	Clay	(Ukraine) Natalia Nemchinova	(Czech Republic) Jana Macurová (Czech Republic) Milena Nekvapilová	6–3, 7–6
Loss	2.	7 August 1995	Paderborn, Germany	Clay	(Russia) Anna Linkova	(Czech Republic) Milena Nekvapilová (Czech Republic) Sylva Nesvadbová	1–6, 4–6
Win	3.	13 May 1996	Prešov, Slovakia	Clay	(Bulgaria) Teodora Nedeva	(Slovakia) Ľudmila Cervanová (Slovakia) Martina Nedelková	6–4, 6–3
Loss	3.	28 July 1996	Valladolid, Spain	Hard	(Czech Republic) Milena Nekvapilová	(Israel) Shiri Burstein (Israel) Limor Gabai	2–6, 4–6
Win	4.	5 August 1996	Paderborn, Germany	Clay	(Czech Republic) Sylva Nesvadbová	(Czech Republic) Ivana Havrlíková (Czech Republic) Denisa Sobotková	6–3, 3–6, 6–1
Loss	4.	25 January 1997	Istanbul, Turkey	Hard	(Czech Republic) Milena Nekvapilová	(Czech Republic) Jana Ondrouchová (Czech Republic) Hana Šromová	2–6, 1–6
Win	5.	8 September 1997	La Paz, Bolivia	Clay	(Mexico) Karin Palme	(Argentina) Mariana Lopez Palacios (Argentina) Laura Montalvo	4–6, 6–3, 6–2
Win	6.	15 September 1997	Santiago, Chile	Clay	(Switzerland) Aliénor Tricerri	(Argentina) Mariana Lopez Palacios (Argentina) Laura Montalvo	6–4, 6–3
Win	7.	6 October 1997	Montevideo, Uruguay	Clay	(Argentina) Paula Racedo	(Paraguay) Laura Bernal (Brazil) Vanessa Menga	6–1, 4–6, 6–4
Loss	5.	18 October 1997	Asunción, Paraguay	Clay	(Argentina) Paula Racedo	(Paraguay) Larissa Schaerer (Brazil) Vanessa Menga	w/o
Loss	6.	10 November 1997	Rio de Janeiro, Brazil	Clay	(Argentina) Paula Racedo	(Slovakia) Patrícia Marková (Slovakia) Zuzana Váleková	0–6, 7–6^{(4–7)}, 2–6
Loss	7.	23 March 1998	Corowa, Australia	Grass	(Japan) Tomoe Hotta	(Australia) Lisa McShea (Australia) Alicia Molik	0–6, 0–6
Win	8.	27 April 1998	Caboolture, Australia	Clay	(Australia) Lisa McShea	(Australia) Melissa Beadman (Australia) Bryanne Stewart	2–6, 7–6^{(7–5)}, 7–5
Win	9.	10 May 1998	Maryborough, Australia	Clay	(Australia) Lisa McShea	(Thailand) Suvimol Duangchan (Thailand) Marissa Niroj	6–4, 6–0
Win	10.	10 August 1998	Koksijde, Belgium	Clay	(Argentina) Luciana Masante	(Netherlands) Lotty Seelen (Slovakia) Katarina Valkyova	6–3, 7–5
Loss	8.	11 July 1999	Darmstadt, Germany	Clay	(Czech Republic) Ludmila Richterová	(Hungary) Petra Mandula (Belarus) Tatiana Poutchek	3–6, 1–6
