= Anna Linkova =

Russian tennis player

Anna Linkova Анна Линкова
- Full name: Anna Linkova
- Country (sports): Russia
- Born: 22 January 1977 (age 48); Soviet Union
- Prize money: $25,811

Singles
- Career record: 93–65
- Career titles: 1 ITF
- Highest ranking: No. 338 (27 January 1997)

Grand Slam singles results
- French Open Junior: 1R (1994)
- Wimbledon Junior: 2R (1994)

Doubles
- Career record: 61–59
- Career titles: 1 ITF
- Highest ranking: No. 247 (21 July 1997)

Grand Slam doubles results
- French Open Junior: 2R (1994)
- Wimbledon Junior: 2R (1994)

Anna Linkova (Russian: Анна Линкова; born 22 January 1977) is a former Russian tennis player.

Linkova won one singles and one doubles title on the ITF tour in her career. On 27 January 1997, she reached her best singles ranking of world number 338. On 21 July 1997, she peaked at world number 247 in the doubles rankings.

Linkova made her WTA tour debut at the 1995 Moscow Ladies Open – Doubles.

== ITF finals ==
=== Singles (1–2) ===
Legend $100,000 tournaments $75,000 tournaments $50,000 tournaments $25,000 tournaments $10,000 tournaments	Finals by surface Hard (1–1) Clay (0–0) Grass (0–0) Carpet (0–1)

Result	No.	Date	Tournament	Surface	Opponent	Score
Win	1.	11 October 1993	Moscow, Russia	Hard (i)	(Russia) Julia Lutrova	7–5, 1–6, 7–6^{(8–6)}
Loss	1.	9 October 1995	Jūrmala, Latvia	Hard (i)	(Ukraine) Natalia Biletskaya	6–7^{(3–7)}, 5–7
Loss	2.	23 October 1995	Samara, Russia	Carpet (i)	(Ukraine) Natalia Nemchinova	4–6, 6–3, 6–7^{(3–7)}

=== Doubles (1–14) ===
Legend $100,000 tournaments $75,000 tournaments $50,000 tournaments $25,000 tournaments $10,000 tournaments	Finals by surface Hard (1–3) Clay (0–9) Grass (0–1) Carpet (0–1)

Result	No.	Date	Tournament	Surface	Partner	Opponents	Score
Loss	1.	21 February 1994	Amadora, Portugal	Hard	(Russia) Alina Jidkova	(Bulgaria) Teodora Nedeva (Bulgaria) Antoaneta Pandjerova	3–6, 1–6
Loss	2.	12 December 1994	Přerov, Czech Republic	Hard (i)	(Slovakia) Henrieta Nagyová	(Czech Republic) Olga Hostáková (Czech Republic) Eva Krejčová	4–6, 4–6
Loss	3.	22 May 1995	Ratzeburg, Germany	Clay	(Netherlands) Amanda Hopmans	(Israel) Nelly Barkan (Germany) Claudia Timm	2–6, 1–6
Loss	4.	26 June 1995	Velp, Netherlands	Clay	(Israel) Nelly Barkan	(Netherlands) Henriëtte van Aalderen (Netherlands) Stephanie Gomperts	1–6, 0–6
Loss	5.	24 July 1995	Heerhugowaard, Netherlands	Clay	(Ukraine) Natalia Chasovaya	(Netherlands) Stephanie Gomperts (Netherlands) Stephanie Rottier	4–6, 1–6
Loss	6.	31 July 1995	Horb am Neckar, Germany	Clay	(Bulgaria) Pavlina Nola	(Czech Republic) Ivana Havrlíková (Czech Republic) Monika Kratochvílová	2–6, 5–7
Loss	7.	7 August 1995	Paderborn, Germany	Clay	(Czech Republic) Monika Maštalířová	(Czech Republic) Milena Nekvapilová (Czech Republic) Sylva Nesvadbová	1–6, 4–6
Loss	8.	23 October 1995	Samara, Russia	Carpet (i)	(Ukraine) Natalia Nemchinova	(Russia) Natalia Egorova (Russia) Maria Marfina	1–6, 0–6
Win	1.	30 October 1995	Moscow, Russia	Hard (i)	(Ukraine) Natalia Nemchinova	(Belarus) Natalia Noreiko (Belarus) Marina Stets	6–2, 2–6, 6–3
Loss	9.	6 May 1996	Le Touquet, France	Clay	(Belgium) Patty Van Acker	(France) Nathalie Herreman (France) Karine Quentrec	1–6, 1–6
Loss	10.	26 August 1996	Sochi, Russia	Clay	(Russia) Olga Ivanova	(Brazil) Miriam D'Agostini (Dominican Republic) Joelle Schad	4–6, 3–6
Loss	11.	13 January 1997	Helsinki, Finland	Hard (i)	(Netherlands) Maaike Koutstaal	(Czech Republic) Olga Blahotová (Czech Republic) Gabriela Navrátilová	2–6, 1–6
Loss	12.	23 June 1997	Milan, Italy	Grass	(Russia) Maria Goloviznina	(Japan) Tomoe Hotta (Japan) Yoriko Yamagishi	3–6, 7–5, 4–6
Loss	13.	30 June 1997	Sezze, Italy	Clay	(Romania) Andreea Vanc	(Italy) Laura Garrone (Italy) Elena Savoldi	3–6, 0–6
Loss	14.	7 July 1997	Fiumicino, Italy	Clay	(Sweden) Sofia Finér	(Czech Republic) Zuzana Hejdová (Czech Republic) Jana Macurová	1–6, 1–6
