= Kim Grant (tennis) =

South African tennis player

- Country (sports): South Africa
- Residence: Atherton, United States
- Born: 1 May 1971 (age 53); Klerksdorp, South Africa
- Height: 1.69 m (5 ft 7 in)
- Turned pro: 1992
- Retired: 2010
- Plays: Right-handed (two-handed backhand)
- Prize money: $160,324

Singles
- Career record: 92–159
- Career titles: 0
- Highest ranking: No. 414 (31 July 1995)

Doubles
- Career record: 200–247
- Career titles: 0 WTA, 10 ITF
- Highest ranking: No. 76 (6 May 2002)

Grand Slam doubles results
- Australian Open: 2R (2002)
- French Open: 1R (2001 & 2002)
- Wimbledon: 1R (2000, 2001 & 2002)
- US Open: 2R (2002 & 2003)

Kim Grant (born 1 May 1971) is a former professional South African tennis player. Her career-high WTA rankings are 414 in singles, achieved on 31 July 1995, and 76 in doubles, set on 6 May 2002.

== WTA Tour career finals ==
=== Doubles: 1 runner-up ===
Legend
Grand Slam tournaments (0)
WTA Championships (0)
Tier I (0)
Tier II (0)
Tier III (0-1)
Tier IV & V (0)

Result	Date	Tournament	Surface	Partner	Opponents	Score
Loss	May 2000	Strasbourg, France	Clay	(Venezuela) María Alejandra Vento	(Argentina) Florencia Labat (Canada) Sonya Jeyaseelan	4–6, 3–6

== ITF Circuit finals ==
$100,000 tournaments
$75,000 tournaments
$50,000 tournaments
$25,000 tournaments
$10,000 tournaments

=== Singles (0–1) ===
Result	No.	Date	Tournament	Surface	Opponent	Score
Loss	1.	24 October 1994	Negril, Jamaica	Hard	(Slovakia) Radka Zrubáková	0–6, 2–6

=== Doubles (10–12) ===
$100,000 tournaments
$75,000 tournaments
$50,000 tournaments
$25,000 tournaments
$10,000 tournaments

Result	No.	Date	Tournament	Surface	Partner	Opponents	Score
Loss	1.	22 March 1993	Harare, Zimbabwe	Hard	(South Africa) Michelle Anderson	(Zimbabwe) Paula Iversen (United States) Claire Sessions Bailey	1–6, 3–6
Loss	2.	9 May 1994	Acapulco, Mexico	Clay	(United States) Ditta Huber	(Chile) Paula Cabezas (Puerto Rico) Emilie Viqueira	6–3, 2–6, 1–6
Win	3.	24 October 1994	Negril, Jamaica	Hard	(United States) Claire Sessions Bailey	(Namibia) Elizma Nortje (Colombia) Ximena Rodríguez	6–2, 6–7^{(6–8)}, 6–3
Win	4.	9 January 1995	Mission, United States	Hard	(United States) Claire Sessions Bailey	(Israel) Shiri Burstein (Israel) Hila Rosen	7–6^{(7–5)}, 6–2
Loss	5.	16 January 1995	San Antonio, United States	Hard	(United States) Claire Sessions Bailey	(Israel) Shiri Burstein (Israel) Hila Rosen	2–6, 3–6
Loss	6.	30 October 1995	Freeport, Bahamas	Hard	(United States) Claire Sessions Bailey	(United States) Rebecca Jensen (Jamaica) Iwalani McCalla	2–6, 4–6
Win	7.	5 January 1998	San Antonio, United States	Hard	(United States) Mashona Washington	(Slovakia) Andrea Šebová (Slovakia) Silvia Uricková	4–6, 7–6^{(7–3)}, 6–2
Loss	8.	20 April 1998	Indian Hill, United States	Hard	(United States) Jolene Watanabe-Giltz	(United States) Erika deLone (United States) Katie Schlukebir	4–6, 6–4, 3–6
Loss	9.	5 April 1999	Fresno, United States	Hard	(Sweden) Kristina Triska	(United States) Erika deLone (Australia) Annabel Ellwood	5–7, 5–7
Loss	10.	30 May 1999	El Paso, United States	Hard	(United States) Sara Walker	(India) Manisha Malhotra (United States) Julie Scott	2–6, 4–6
Win	11.	21 June 1999	Easton, United States	Hard	(United States) Lindsay Lee	(United States) Holly Parkinson (United States) Julie Scott	6–4, 7–6^{(9–7)}
Win	12.	5 July 1999	Edmond, United States	Hard	(United States) Stephanie Mabry	(United States) Lauren Kalvaria (United States) Gabriela Lastra	6–4, 6–1
Loss	13.	13 September 1999	Hopewell, United States	Hard	(United States) Dawn Buth	(China) Li Fang (Russia) Alina Jidkova	3–6, 3–6
Loss	14.	4 June 2001	Surbiton, United Britain	Grass	(United States) Lilia Osterloh	(United Kingdom) Julie Pullin (United Kingdom) Lorna Woodroffe	6–7, 5–7
Loss	15.	15 July 2001	Felixstowe, Great Britain	Grass	(South Africa) Natalie Grandin	(Australia) Trudi Musgrave (United Kingdom) Julie Pullin	5–7, 4–6
Win	16.	19 March 2002	La Canada, United States	Hard	(United States) Abigail Spears	(United Kingdom) Julie Pullin (United Kingdom) Lorna Woodroffe	4–6, 7–5, 6–1
Win	17.	29 October 2002	Nottingham, Great Britain	Hard (i)	(United States) Lilia Osterloh	(United Kingdom) Lucie Ahl (Tunisia) Selima Sfar	6–1, 6–2
Win	18.	27 April 2003	Taranto, Italy	Clay	(South Africa) Natalie Grandin	(Austria) Nicole Remis (Romania) Delia Sescioreanu	6–2, 6–1
Loss	19.	8 July 2003	College Park, United States	Hard	(Puerto Rico) Kristina Brandi	(United States) Jennifer Russell (Australia) Lisa McShea	2–6, 6–4, 5–7
Loss	20.	20 October 2003	Paducah, United States	Hard	(United States) Samantha Reeves	(China) Yan Zi (China) Zheng Jie	2–6, 3–6
Win	21.	2 June 2007	Carson, United States	Hard	(United States) Sunitha Rao	(United States) Angela Haynes (United States) Lindsay Lee-Waters	6–4, 6–4
Win	22.	7 July 2007	Southlake, United States	Hard	(South Africa) Surina De Beer	(Canada) Stéphanie Dubois (Canada) Valérie Tétreault	4–6, 6–4, 6–4
