= Shiri Burstein =

Israeli tennis player

- Native name: שירי בורשטין
- Country (sports): Israel
- Born: 5 December 1974 (age 50)
- Prize money: $29,596

Singles
- Career titles: 2 ITF
- Highest ranking: No. 336 (24 July 1995)

Doubles
- Career titles: 6 ITF
- Highest ranking: No. 186 (17 February 1997)

Team competitions
- Fed Cup: 1–5

Shiri Burstein (Hebrew: שירי בורשטין; born 5 December 1974) is an Israeli former professional tennis player.

Burstein represented Israel in a total of five Fed Cup ties across 1994 and 1995, mostly as a doubles player.

On the professional tour, Burstein reached a best singles ranking of 336, winning two ITF tournaments. She won a further six ITF titles in doubles, with a best ranking of 186 in the world.

== ITF finals ==
$25,000 tournaments
$10,000 tournaments

=== Singles: 5 (2–3) ===
Outcome	No.	Date	Tournament	Surface	Opponent	Score
Runner-up	1.	18 May 1992	Haifa, Israel	Hard	(Israel) Limor Zaltz	2–6, 6–2, 5–7
Runner-up	2.	15 March 1993	Jaffa, Israel	Hard	(Georgia (country)) Nino Louarsabishvili	1–6, 2–6
Winner	1.	22 August 1994	Haifa, Israel	Hard	(Germany) Nina Nittinger	7–6^{(0)}, 6–0
Winner	2.	9 January 1995	Mission, United States	Hard	(United States) Sara Pritchard	6–1, 6–7^{(5)}, 6–4
Runner-up	3.	29 May 1995	Jaffa, Israel	Hard	(Israel) Nelly Barkan	6–4, 3–6, 1–6

=== Doubles: 11 (6–5) ===
Outcome	No.	Date	Tournament	Surface	Partner	Opponents	Score
Winner	1.	22 August 1994	Haifa 1, Israel	Hard	(Israel) Hila Rosen	(Israel) Nataly Cahana (Israel) Tzipora Obziler	6–0, 6–4
Winner	2.	29 August 1994	Haifa 2, Israel	Hard	(Israel) Hila Rosen	(Israel) Nataly Cahana (Israel) Tzipora Obziler	7–5, 7–5
Winner	3.	17 October 1994	Langenthal, Switzerland	Carpet	(Israel) Hila Rosen	(Netherlands) Amanda Hopmans (Netherlands) Henriëtte van Aalderen	7–5, 6–4
Runner-up	1.	13 November 1994	Cairo, Egypt	Clay	(Israel) Hila Rosen	(Czech Republic) Jindra Gabrisová (Czech Republic) Dominika Gorecká	1–6, 6–3, 1–6
Runner-up	2.	9 January 1995	Mission, United States	Hard	(Israel) Hila Rosen	(South Africa) Kim Grant (United States) Claire Sessions Bailey	6–7^{(6)}, 2–6
Winner	4.	16 January 1995	San Antonio, United States	Hard	(Israel) Hila Rosen	(South Africa) Kim Grant (United States) Claire Sessions Bailey	6–2, 6–3
Runner-up	3.	4 March 1996	Haifa, Israel	Hard	(Israel) Hila Rosen	(United Kingdom) Julie Pullin (United Kingdom) Kate Warne-Holland	2–6, 4–6
Winner	5.	17 March 1996	Tel Aviv, Israel	Hard	(Israel) Hila Rosen	(Israel) Limor Gabai (Israel) Tzipora Obziler	6–3, 7–6
Winner	6.	28 July 1996	Valladolid, Spain	Hard	(Israel) Limor Gabai	(Czech Republic) Milena Nekvapilová (Czech Republic) Monika Maštalířová	6–2, 6–4
Runner-up	4.	24 November 1996	Ismailia, Egypt	Clay	(Netherlands) Debby Haak	(Bulgaria) Teodora Nedeva (Slovenia) Katarina Srebotnik	4–6, 4–6
Runner-up	5.	4 May 1997	Azeméis, Portugal	Clay	(Israel) Limor Gabai	(Spain) Paula Hermida (Canada) Aneta Soukup	0–6, 4–6

== See also ==
- List of Israel Fed Cup team representatives
