= Tatiana Poutchek =

Belarusian tennis player

Tatiana Poutchek Таццяна Пучак
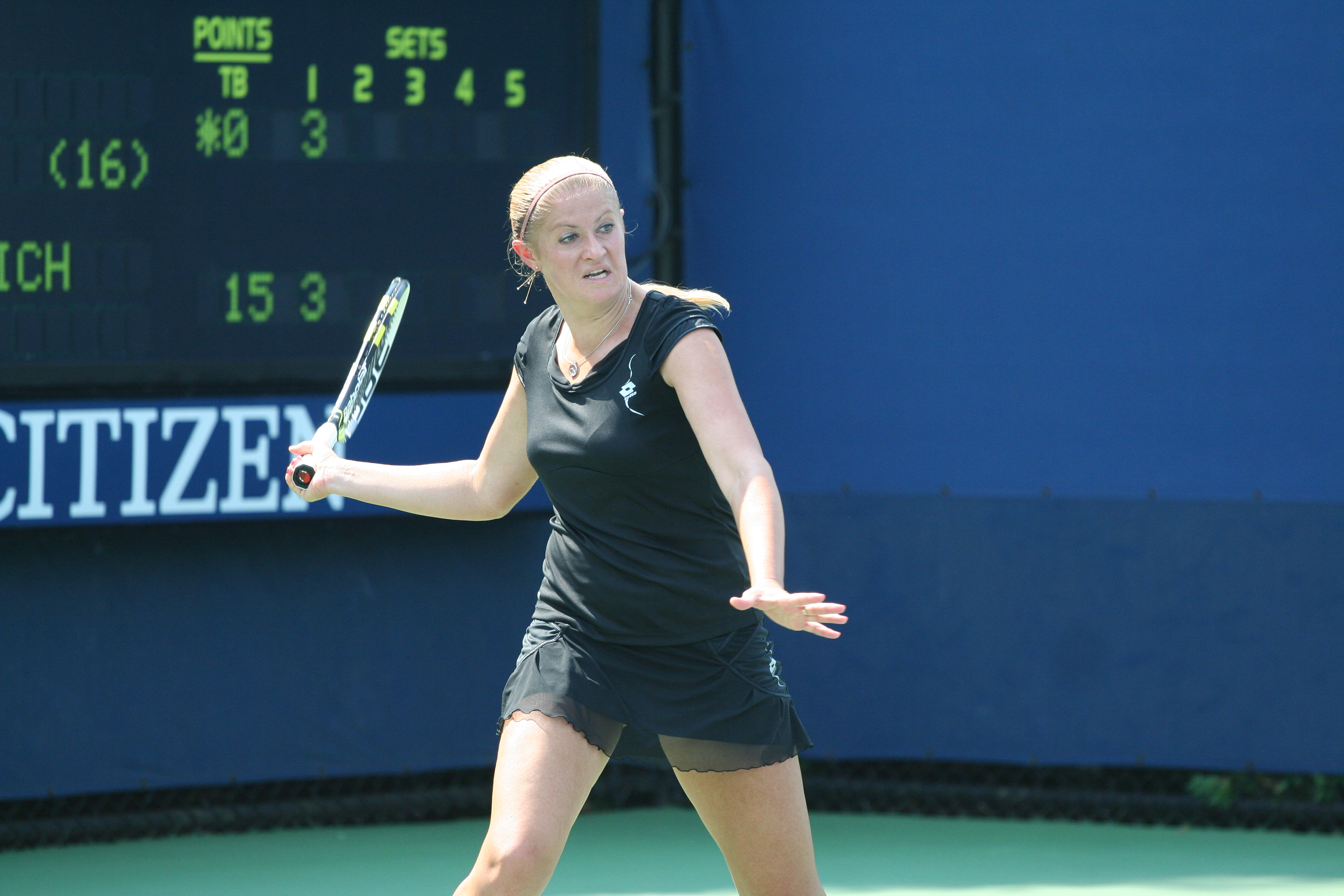
- Country (sports): Belarus
- Residence: Minsk, Belarus
- Born: 9 January 1979 (age 47) Minsk, Byelorussian SSR, Soviet Union
- Height: 1.76 m (5 ft 9 in)
- Turned pro: 1998
- Retired: 2012
- Plays: Right-handed (two-handed backhand)
- Prize money: $1,366,302

Singles
- Career record: 431–390
- Career titles: 3 ITF
- Highest ranking: No. 55 (22 July 2002)

Grand Slam singles results
- Australian Open: 3R (2003)
- French Open: 2R (2001, 2007)
- Wimbledon: 2R (2002, 2007)
- US Open: 2R (2001)

Doubles
- Career record: 387–337
- Career titles: 8 WTA, 20 ITF
- Highest ranking: No. 25 (29 September 2008)

Grand Slam doubles results
- Australian Open: 2R (2004, 2008, 2009)
- French Open: 2R (2000, 2001, 2007, 2008)
- Wimbledon: 3R (2009)
- US Open: 3R (2008)

Grand Slam mixed doubles results
- French Open: 1R (2008)
- Wimbledon: 2R (2008)
- US Open: 1R (2008)

Tatiana Poutchek (Belarusian: Таццяна Мікалаеўна Пучак; Russian: Татьяна Николаевна Пучек; born 9 January 1979) is a retired tennis player and current captain of the Belarus Billie Jean King Cup team. Her career-high ranking is No. 55 in the world, achieved on 22 July 2002.

Many of Poutchek's greatest career results came in Tashkent reaching one singles final and seven doubles finals winning five.

In 2002, she made her only WTA Tour singles final there, losing to Marie-Gayanay Mikaelian. In doubles, she won eight titles on the WTA Tour (five in Tashkent, two in Guangzhou, and one in Baku) between 2002 and 2010, and 20 titles on the ITF Women's Circuit between 1997 and 2009.

== WTA career finals ==
=== Singles: 1 (runner-up) ===
Legend
Tier I (0/0)
Tier II (0/0)
Tier III (0/0)
Tier IV & V (0/1)

Result	Date	Tournament	Surface	Opponent	Score
Loss	Jun 2002	Tashkent Open, Uzbekistan	Hard	(Switzerland) Marie-Gayanay Mikaelian	4–6, 4–6

=== Doubles: 15 (8 titles, 7 runner-ups) ===
Legend: Before 2009	Starting in 2009
Tier I (0/1)	Premier M (0/0)
Tier II (0/1)	Premier 5 (0/0)
Tier III (1/1)	Premier (0/0)
Tier IV & V (3/3)	International (4/1)

Result	No.	Date	Tournament	Surface	Partner	Opponents	Score
Loss	1.	Jun 2001	Tashkent Open, Uzbekistan	Hard	(Ukraine) Tatiana Perebiynis	(Hungary) Petra Mandula (Austria) Patricia Wartusch	1–6, 4–6
Win	1.	Jun 2002	Tashkent Open, Uzbekistan	Hard	(Ukraine) Tatiana Perebiynis	(Germany) Mia Buric (Russia) Galina Fokina	7–5, 6–2
Loss	2.	Feb 2003	Bangalore Open, India	Hard	(Russia) Eugenia Kulikovskaya	(Russia) Elena Likhovtseva (Uzbekistan) Iroda Tulyaganova	4–6, 4–6
Win	2.	Oct 2003	Tashkent Open, Uzbekistan	Hard	(Ukraine) Yuliya Beygelzimer	(China) Li Ting (China) Sun Tiantian	6–3, 7–6^{(0)}
Win	3.	Oct 2006	Tashkent Open, Uzbekistan	Hard	(Belarus) Victoria Azarenka	(Italy) Maria-Elena Camerin (Switzerland) Emmanuelle Gagliardi	w/o
Loss	3.	Jul 2007	Cincinnati Open, United States	Hard	(Russia) Alina Jidkova	(United States) Bethanie Mattek (India) Sania Mirza	6–7^{(4)}, 5–7
Loss	4.	Oct 2007	Tashkent Open, Uzbekistan	Hard	(Australia) Anastasia Rodionova	(Belarus) Ekaterina Dzehalevich (Belarus) Anastasia Yakimova	6–2, 4–6, [7–10]
Loss	5.	Oct 2007	Kremlin Cup, Russia	Hard	(Belarus) Victoria Azarenka	(Zimbabwe) Cara Black (United States) Liezel Huber	6–4, 1–6, [7–10]
Loss	6.	Jan 2008	Sydney International, Australia	Hard	(Ukraine) Tatiana Perebiynis	(China) Yan Zi (China) Zheng Jie	4–6, 6–7^{(5)}
Win	4.	Sep 2008	Guangzhou Open, China	Hard	(Ukraine) Mariya Koryttseva	(China) Sun Tiantian (China) Yan Zi	6–4, 4–6, [10–8]
Win	5.	Sep 2009	Guangzhou Open, China	Hard	(Belarus) Olga Govortsova	(Japan) Kimiko Date (China) Sun Tiantian	3–6, 6–2, [10–8]
Win	6.	Sep 2009	Tashkent Open, Uzbekistan	Hard	(Belarus) Olga Govortsova	(Russia) Vitalia Diatchenko (Belarus) Ekaterina Dzehalevich	6–2, 6–7^{(1)}, [10–8]
Loss	7.	Aug 2010	Copenhagen Open, Denmark	Hard	(Russia) Vitalia Diatchenko	(Germany) Julia Görges (Germany) Anna-Lena Grönefeld	4–6, 4–6
Win	7.	Sep 2010	Tashkent Open, Uzbekistan	Hard	(Russia) Alexandra Panova	(Romania) Alexandra Dulgheru (Slovakia) Magdaléna Rybáriková	6–3, 6–4
Win	8.	Jul 2011	Baku Cup, Azerbaijan	Hard	(Ukraine) Mariya Koryttseva	(Romania) Monica Niculescu (Kazakhstan) Galina Voskoboeva	6–3, 2–6, [10–8]

== ITF Circuit finals ==
Legend
$100,000 tournaments
$75,000 tournaments
$50,000 tournaments
$25,000 tournaments
$10,000 tournaments

=== Singles: 10 (3–7) ===
Result	No.	Date	Tournament	Surface	Opponent	Score
Loss	1.	8 September 1996	ITF Donetsk, Ukraine	Clay	(Ukraine) Tatiana Kovalchuk	5–7, 0–1 ret.
Loss	2.	24 August 1998	ITF Skiathos, Greece	Carpet	(Greece) Eleni Daniilidou	3–6, 4–6
Loss	3.	9 May 1999	ITF Beersheba, Israel	Hard	(Israel) Hila Rosen	2–6, 1–6
Loss	4.	3 October 1999	ITF Tbilisi, Georgia	Clay	(Germany) Julia Abe	2–6, 0–6
Loss	5.	6 March 2000	ITF Ortisei, Italy	Hard (i)	(Belarus) Nadejda Ostrovskaya	6–4, 1–6, 6–7^{(6)}
Win	1.	2 October 2000	Batumi Ladies Open, Georgia	Carpet (i)	(Belarus) Nadejda Ostrovskaya	4–1, 4–1, 2–4, 1–4, 5–4^{(4)}
Win	2.	24 September 2001	Batumi Ladies Open, Georgia	Carpet (i)	(Belarus) Nadejda Ostrovskaya	7–5, 4–6, 6–3
Loss	6.	13 July 2003	ITF Vittel, France	Clay	(Czech Republic) Eva Birnerová	4–6, 4–6
Win	3.	8 May 2005	ITF Warsaw, Poland	Clay	(Ukraine) Oxana Lyubtsova	6–0, 4–6, 6–2
Loss	7.	15 August 2006	Bronx Open, United States	Hard	(Russia) Olga Puchkova	3–6, 1–6

=== Doubles: 44 (20–24) ===
Result	No.	Date	Tournament	Surface	Partner	Opponents	Score
Loss	1.	29 January 1996	ITF Ourense, Spain	Hard (i)	(Belarus) Olga Glouschenko	(Netherlands) Annemarie Mikkers (Netherlands) Henriëtte van Aalderen	1–6, 3–6
Loss	2.	18 February 1996	ITF Faro, Portugal	Hard	(United States) Lesley Kramer	(Germany) Katrin Kilsch (Germany) Claudia Kohde-Kilsch	7–5, 2–6, 0–6
Loss	3.	28 September 1997	ITF Bucharest, Romania	Clay	(Belarus) Olga Glouschenko	(Hungary) Virág Csurgó (Slovakia) Janette Husárová	0–6, 0–6
Win	1.	13 October 1997	ITF Šiauliai, Lithuania	Carpet (i)	(Belarus) Olga Glouschenko	(Belarus) Nadejda Ostrovskaya (Belarus) Vera Zhukovets	7–5, 6–3
Loss	4.	24 August 1998	ITF Skiathos, Greece	Carpet	(North Macedonia) Marina Lazarovska	(Greece) Eleni Daniilidou (Greece) Evagelia Roussi	6–3, 4–6, 2–6
Win	2.	28 September 1998	ITF Tbilisi, Georgia	Clay	(Belarus) Olga Glouschenko	(Georgia (country)) Margalita Chakhnashvili (Georgia (country)) Sophia Managadze	6–2, 6–4
Loss	5.	1 November 1998	ITF Minsk, Belarus	Clay	(Belarus) Olga Glouschenko	(Australia) Anastasia Rodionova (Russia) Ekaterina Paniouchkina	5–7, 7–5, 3–6
Loss	6.	15 November 1998	ITF Ramat Hasharon, Israel	Hard	(Belarus) Olga Glouschenko	(Belgium) Kim Clijsters (Belgium) Justine Henin	2–6, 0–6
Loss	7.	15 March 1999	ITF Ashkelon, Israel	Hard	(Belarus) Nadejda Ostrovskaya	(Australia) Rachel McQuillan (Australia) Louise Pleming	3–6, 2–6
Loss	8.	25 April 1999	ITF Gelos, France	Clay	(France) Sophie Georges	(Australia) Trudi Musgrave (Australia) Bryanne Stewart	6–1, 4–6, 3–6
Win	3.	3 May 1999	ITF Beersheba, Israel	Hard	(Belarus) Nadejda Ostrovskaya	(Israel) Nataly Cahana (Israel) Tzipora Obziler	6–1, 6–4
Win	4.	24 May 1999	ITF Budapest, Hungary	Clay	(Italy) Alice Canepa	(Spain) Eva Bes (Spain) Mariam Ramón Climent	6–3, 6–0
Win	5.	11 July 1999	ITF Darmstadt, Germany	Clay	(Hungary) Petra Mandula	(Czech Republic) Ludmila Richterová (Czech Republic) Monika Maštalířová	6–3, 6–1
Win	6.	25 October 1999	ITF Minsk, Belarus	Carpet (i)	(Belarus) Marina Stets	(Czech Republic) Jana Macurová (Czech Republic) Gabriela Navrátilová	6–4, 6–2
Loss	9.	13 December 1999	ITF Průhonice, Czech Republic	Hard (i)	(Belarus) Nadejda Ostrovskaya	(Slovakia) Martina Suchá (Czech Republic) Helena Vildová	3–6, 6–2, 2–6
Loss	10.	10 April 2000	ITF Maglie, Italy	Carpet	(Bulgaria) Svetlana Krivencheva	(Italy) Alice Canepa (Italy) Maria Paola Zavagli	1–6, 4–6
Loss	11.	3 July 2000	ITF Civitanova, Italy	Clay	(Russia) Evgenia Kulikovskaya	(Spain) Rosa María Andrés Rodríguez (Spain) Conchita Martínez Granados	2–6, 3–6
Win	7.	8 October 2000	Batumi Ladies Open, Georgia	Carpet (i)	(Ukraine) Tatiana Perebiynis	(Argentina) Mariana Díaz Oliva (Denmark) Eva Dyrberg	1–4, 4–2, 4–1, 4–2
Win	8.	24 September 2001	Batumi Ladies Open, Georgia	Carpet (i)	(Hungary) Katalin Marosi	(Belarus) Nadejda Ostrovskaya (Russia) Anastasia Rodionova	6–3, 7–6^{(3)}
Loss	12.	2 May 2003	Open Saint-Gaudens, France	Clay	(Australia) Anastasia Rodionova	(Russia) Evgenia Kulikovskaya (Ukraine) Tatiana Perebiynis	6–7^{(8)}, 3–6
Win	9.	13 July 2003	ITF Vittel, France	Clay	(Ukraine) Yuliya Beygelzimer	(Czech Republic) Eva Birnerová (Czech Republic) Libuše Průšová	6–3, 6–2
Win	10.	18 August 2003	Bronx Open, United States	Hard	(Ukraine) Yuliya Beygelzimer	(Italy) Mara Santangelo (Tunisia) Selima Sfar	6–4, 7–5
Loss	13.	14 September 2003	ITF Denain, France	Clay	(Ukraine) Yuliya Beygelzimer	(Italy) Mara Santangelo (Italy) Antonella Serra Zanetti	5–7, 3–6
Loss	14.	2 November 2003	ITF Poitiers, France	Hard (i)	(Ukraine) Yuliya Beygelzimer	(France) Caroline Dhenin (Germany) Bianka Lamade	5–7, 2–6
Loss	15.	10 November 2003	ITF Eugene, United States	Hard	(Russia) Alina Jidkova	(United States) Teryn Ashley (United States) Shenay Perry	6–3, 2–6, 4–6
Win	11.	7 June 2004	ITF Vaduz, Liechtenstein	Clay	(Australia) Anastasia Rodionova	(Hungary) Kira Nagy (Sweden) Maria Wolfbrandt	6–3, 6–4
Win	12.	3 April 2005	ITF Augusta, United States	Hard	(Australia) Anastasia Rodionova	(Japan) Rika Fujiwara (Japan) Saori Obata	7–6^{(3)}, 6–0
Win	13.	5 April 2005	ITF Tunica Resorts, United States	Clay	(Australia) Anastasia Rodionova	(Romania) Edina Gallovits (Uzbekistan) Varvara Lepchenko	6–2, 6–4
Loss	16.	26 April 2005	ITF Taranto, Italy	Clay	(Belarus) Nadejda Ostrovskaya	(Bosnia and Herzegovina) Mervana Jugić-Salkić (Croatia) Darija Jurak	3–6, 7–6^{(3)}, 3–6
Loss	17.	7 May 2005	ITF Warsaw, Poland	Clay	(Australia) Anastasia Rodionova	(Poland) Karolina Kosińska (Poland) Alicja Rosolska	6–4, 2–6, 6–7^{(3)}
Loss	18.	23 July 2005	ITF Galatina, Italy	Clay	(Australia) Jarmila Wolfe	(Australia) Casey Dellacqua (Australia) Lucia Gonzalez	4–6, 3–6
Win	14.	7 August 2005	ITF Washington, United States	Clay	(Ukraine) Olena Antypina	(United States) Jennifer Hopkins (China) Yan Zi	6–4, 6–4
Loss	19.	16 August 2005	Bronx Open, United States	Hard	(Belarus) Anastasiya Yakimova	(China) Li Ting (China) Sun Tiantian	6–2, 2–6, 4–6
Win	15.	15 November 2005	ITF Tucson, United States	Hard	(Belarus) Victoria Azarenka	(Brazil) Maria Fernanda Alves (Hungary) Melinda Czink	4–6, 7–6, 6–1
Loss	20.	30 January 2006	ITF Ortisei, Italy	Carpet (i)	(Belarus) Anastasiya Yakimova	(Czech Republic) Lucie Hradecká (Czech Republic) Vladimíra Uhlířová	4–6, 2–6
Win	16.	14 May 2006	ITF Jounieh Open, Lebanon	Clay	(Belarus) Anastasiya Yakimova	(Argentina) María José Argeri (Brazil) Letícia Sobral	6–4, 7–6^{(5)}
Loss	21.	26 November 2006	ITF Poitiers, France	Hard (i)	(Belarus) Darya Kustova	(Ukraine) Yuliya Beygelzimer (Ukraine) Yuliana Fedak	5–7, 3–6
Loss	22.	4 February 2007	ITF Ortisei, Italy	Carpet (i)	(Belarus) Darya Kustova	(Czech Republic) Olga Vymetálková (Ukraine) Mariya Koryttseva	3–6, 6–4, 3–6
Win	17.	4 March 2007	Las Vegas Open, United States	Hard	(Belarus) Victoria Azarenka	(Estonia) Maret Ani (Italy) Alberta Brianti	6–2, 6–4
Win	18.	13 May 2007	ITF Jounieh Open, Lebanon	Clay	(Belarus) Anastasiya Yakimova	(Romania) Mădălina Gojnea (Romania) Monica Niculescu	7–5, 6–0
Win	19.	10 November 2008	ITF Minsk, Belarus	Hard (i)	(Russia) Alisa Kleybanova	(Ukraine) Lesia Tsurenko (Russia) Anastasia Poltoratskaya	6–1, 6–2
Win	20.	8 March 2009	ITF Fort Walton Beach, U.S.	Hard	(Russia) Alexandra Panova	(Russia) Ekaterina Bychkova (Belarus) Ekaterina Dzehalevich	6–2, 6–2
Loss	23.	14 April 2009	ITF Civitavecchia, Italy	Clay	(Belarus) Darya Kustova	(Argentina) Erica Krauth (France) Aurélie Védy	1–6, 1–6
Loss	24.	21 November 2009	Bratislava Open, Slovakia	Hard (i)	(Australia) Arina Rodionova	(Sweden) Sofia Arvidsson (Netherlands) Michaëlla Krajicek	3–6, 4–6

== Grand Slam doubles performance timeline ==
Key
W	F	SF	QF	#R	RR	Q#	DNQ	A	NH

(W) winner; (F) finalist; (SF) semifinalist; (QF) quarterfinalist; (#R) rounds 4, 3, 2, 1; (RR) round-robin stage; (Q#) qualification round; (DNQ) did not qualify; (A) absent; (NH) not held; (SR) strike rate (events won / competed); (W–L) win–loss record.

Tournament	2000	2001	2002	2003	2004	2005	2006	2007	2008	2009	2010	2011
Australian Open	1R	1R	1R	1R	2R	1R	A	A	2R	2R	1R	1R
French Open	2R	2R	1R	1R	1R	A	1R	2R	2R	1R	1R	1R
Wimbledon	1R	2R	2R	1R	2R	1R	1R	A	1R	3R	1R	2R
US Open	1R	2R	1R	2R	1R	A	A	2R	3R	1R	1R	2R
