= Nadezhda Ostrovskaya =

Belarusian tennis player

Nadezhda Ostrovskaya Надзея Астроўская
- Country (sports): Belarus
- Born: 29 October 1980 (age 45) Minsk, Soviet Union
- Height: 1.77 m (5 ft 10 in)
- Turned pro: October 1995
- Retired: December 2005
- Prize money: $277,754

Singles
- Career record: 233–193
- Career titles: 10 ITF
- Highest ranking: No. 96 (15 January 2001)

Grand Slam singles results
- Australian Open: 1R (2001)
- French Open: Q3 (2003)
- Wimbledon: 1R (2000)
- US Open: Q1 (2000, 2001, 2002, 2003)

Doubles
- Career record: 227–130
- Career titles: 19 ITF
- Highest ranking: No. 78 (15 April 2002)

Grand Slam doubles results
- Australian Open: 2R (2002)
- French Open: 1R (2002)
- Wimbledon: 1R (2002)
- US Open: 1R (2000)

Team competitions
- Fed Cup: 13–9

Nadejda Ostrovskaya (Belarusian: Надзея Астроўская, romanized: Nadzieya Astrowskaya; born 29 October 1980) is a Belarusian former tennis player.

She won ten singles and 19 doubles titles on the ITF Women's Circuit. On 15 January 2001, she reached her best singles ranking of world No. 96. On 15 April 2002, she peaked at No. 78 in the doubles rankings.

Playing for Belarus Fed Cup team, Ostrovskaya has a win–loss record of 13–9.

== ITF Circuit finals ==
=== Singles: 17 (10–7) ===
Legend $75,000 tournaments $25,000 tournaments $10,000 tournaments	Finals by surface Hard (5–3) Clay (1–1) Carpet (4–3)

Result	No.	Date	Tournament	Surface	Opponent	Score
Win	1.	28 October 1996	ITF Minsk, Belarus	Hard (i)	(Russia) Lioudmila Skavronskaia	6–2, 6–4
Loss	1.	13 October 1997	ITF Šiauliai, Lithuania	Carpet (i)	(Belarus) Marina Stets	3–6, 6–4, 1–6
Win	2.	27 October 1997	ITF Minsk, Belarus	Hard (i)	(Belarus) Olga Glouschenko	4–6, 6–4, 6–2
Loss	2.	16 March 1998	ITF Jaffa, Israel	Hard	(Israel) Tzipora Obziler	3–6, 3–6
Loss	3.	27 April 1998	ITF Guimarães, Portugal	Hard	(United States) Sandra de Silva	2–6, 4–6
Win	3.	13 July 1998	ITF Kharkiv, Ukraine	Clay	(Russia) Elena Voropaeva	7–5, 6–0
Loss	4.	31 August 1998	ITF Sofia, Bulgaria	Clay	(Bulgaria) Dessislava Topalova	4–6, 6–4, 2–6
Win	4.	26 October 1998	ITF Minsk, Belarus	Carpet (i)	(Belarus) Marina Stets	6–1, 6–1
Win	5.	1 February 1999	ITF Istanbul, Turkey	Hard (i)	(Ukraine) Tatiana Perebiynis	6–2, 6–2
Loss	5.	9 August 1999	ITF Istanbul, Turkey	Hard	(Israel) Tzipora Obziler	0–6, 5–7
Win	6.	25 October 1999	ITF Minsk, Belarus	Carpet (i)	(Russia) Ekaterina Kozhokina	7–5, 6–1
Win	7.	8 November 1999	ITF Rungsted, Denmark	Carpet (i)	(Poland) Anna Bieleń-Żarska	6–4, 2–6, 6–3
Win	8.	21 February 2000	ITF Bushey, United Kingdom	Carpet (i)	(France) Sophie Erre	3–6, 6–3, 7–6^{(5)}
Win	9.	6 March 2000	ITF Ortisei, Italy	Hard (i)	(Belarus) Tatiana Poutchek	4–6, 6–1, 7–6^{(6)}
Loss	6.	2 October 2000	Batumi Ladies Open, Georgia	Carpet (i)	(Belarus) Tatiana Poutchek	1–4, 1–4, 4–2, 4–1, 4–5^{(4–6)}
Loss	7.	24 September 2001	Batumi Ladies Open, Georgia	Carpet (i)	(Belarus) Tatiana Poutchek	5–7, 6–4, 3–6
Win	10.	23 September 2002	Batumi Ladies Open, Georgia	Hard	(Ukraine) Alona Bondarenko	1–6, 6–2, 6–4

=== Doubles: 37 (19–18) ===
Legend $75,000 tournaments $50,000 tournaments $25,000 tournaments $10,000 tournaments	Finals by surface Hard (7–5) Clay (8–10) Carpet (4–3)

Result	No.	Date	Tier	Tournament	Surface	Partner	Opponents	Score
Win	1.	28 October 1996	10,000	ITF Minsk, Belarus	Hard (i)	(Belarus) Vera Zhukovets	(Belarus) Natalia Nareiko (Russia) Dasha Ovsiannikova	6–3, 7–6^{(10)}
Win	2.	25 August 1997	10,000	ITF Kyiv, Ukraine	Clay	(Belarus) Vera Zhukovets	(Russia) Irina Kornienko (Latvia) Elena Krutko	6–1, 6–3
Loss	1.	13 October 1997	10,000	ITF Šiauliai, Lithuania	Carpet (i)	(Belarus) Vera Zhukovets	(Belarus) Olga Glouschenko (Belarus) Tatiana Poutchek	5–7, 3–6
Win	3.	20 October 1997	10,000	ITF Jūrmala, Latvia	Carpet (i)	(Belarus) Vera Zhukovets	(Ukraine) Natalia Bondarenko (Belarus) Marina Stets	3–6, 6–3, 6–4
Loss	2.	23 March 1998	10,000	ITF Ashkelon, Israel	Hard	(Czech Republic) Lucie Šteflová	(Israel) Limor Gabai (United Kingdom) Kate Warne-Holland	6–3, 5–7, 5–7
Win	4.	13 July 1998	10,000	ITF Kharkiv, Ukraine	Clay	(Ukraine) Tatiana Kovalchuk	(Ukraine) Natalia Bondarenko (Ukraine) Natalia Nemchinova	6–1, 3–6, 6–1
Loss	3.	1 February 1999	10,000	ITF Istanbul, Turkey	Hard (i)	(Switzerland) Aliénor Tricerri	(Ukraine) Tatiana Perebiynis (Uzbekistan) Iroda Tulyaganova	3–6, 4–6
Loss	4.	15 March 1999	25,000	ITF Ashkelon, Israel	Hard	(Belarus) Tatiana Poutchek	(Australia) Rachel McQuillan (Australia) Louise Pleming	3–6, 2–6
Win	5.	3 May 1999	25,000	ITF Beersheba, Israel	Hard	(Belarus) Tatiana Poutchek	(Israel) Nataly Cahana (Israel) Tzipora Obziler	6–1, 6–4
Loss	5.	21 June 1999	25,000	ITF Sopot, Poland	Clay	(Czech Republic) Lenka Cenková	(Romania) Magda Mihalache (Slovakia) Zuzana Váleková	2–6, 4–6
Win	6.	2 August 1999	25,000	ITF Kharkiv, Ukraine	Clay	(Ukraine) Tatiana Perebiynis	(Russia) Ekaterina Sysoeva (Slovakia) Zuzana Váleková	5–7, 6–3, 6–3
Win	7.	9 August 1999	10,000	ITF Istanbul, Turkey	Hard	(Russia) Ekaterina Paniouchkina	(Armenia) Liudmila Nikoyan (Russia) Ekaterina Sysoeva	6–0, 6–2
Loss	6.	23 August 1999	25,000	ITF Bucharest, Romania	Clay	(Slovakia) Zuzana Váleková	(Spain) Lourdes Domínguez Lino (Spain) Anabel Medina Garrigues	5–7, 2–6
Loss	7.	20 September 1999	25,000	ITF Sofia, Bulgaria	Clay	(Hungary) Katalin Marosi	(Spain) Rosa María Andrés Rodríguez (Spain) Conchita Martínez Granados	w/o
Loss	8.	27 September 1999	25,000	ITF Tbilisi, Georgia	Clay	(Russia) Ekaterina Sysoeva	(Russia) Maria Goloviznina (Russia) Ekaterina Paniouchkina	0–6, 2–6
Loss	9.	13 December 1999	25,000	ITF Průhonice, Czech Republic	Hard (i)	(Belarus) Tatiana Poutchek	(Slovakia) Martina Suchá (Czech Republic) Helena Vildová	3–6, 6–2, 2–6
Win	8.	7 February 2000	25,000	ITF Ljubljana, Slovenia	Carpet (i)	(Hungary) Adrienn Hegedűs	(Czech Republic) Olga Blahotová (Czech Republic) Hana Šromová	7–5, 6–3
Win	9.	21 February 2000	25,000	ITF Bushey, United Kingdom	Carpet (i)	(Australia) Annabel Ellwood	(United Kingdom) Julie Pullin (United Kingdom) Lorna Woodroffe	6–1, 6–1
Win	10.	31 July 2000	50,000	ITF Ettenheim, Germany	Clay	(Ukraine) Anna Zaporozhanova	(Argentina) Mariana Díaz Oliva (Argentina) María Emilia Salerni	6–4, 6–2
Win	11.	15 July 2001	50,000	ITF Modena, Italy	Clay	(Russia) Galina Fokina	(Argentina) Eugenia Chialvo (Spain) Conchita Martínez Granados	6–3, 6–2
Loss	10.	24 September 2001	75,000	Batumi Ladies Open, Georgia	Carpet (i)	(Russia) Anastasia Rodionova	(Hungary) Katalin Marosi-Aracama (Belarus) Tatiana Poutchek	3–6, 6–7^{(3)}
Win	12.	11 February 2003	25,000	ITF Southampton, UK	Hard (i)	(Belarus) Olga Barabanschikova	(Italy) Giulia Casoni (Italy) Roberta Vinci	6–3, 6–4
Win	13.	18 February 2003	25,000	ITF Redbridge, UK	Hard (i)	(Belarus) Olga Barabanschikova	(Serbia and Montenegro) Katarina Mišić (Serbia and Montenegro) Dragana Zarić	6–4, 1–6, 7–5
Loss	11.	14 September 2003	25,000	ITF Tbilisi, Georgia	Clay	(Russia) Galina Voskoboeva	(Belarus) Darya Kustova (Ukraine) Elena Tatarkova	6–2, 2–6, 6–7^{(5)}
Loss	12.	3 May 2004	25,000	ITF Catania, Italy	Clay	(Ukraine) Mariya Koryttseva	(France) Stéphanie Foretz (France) Virginie Razzano	2–6, 1–6
Win	14.	10 May 2004	25,000	ITF Stockholm, Sweden	Clay	(Serbia and Montenegro) Dragana Zarić	(Sweden) Sofia Arvidsson (Sweden) Hanna Nooni	7–6^{(3)}, 6–3
Loss	13.	31 May 2004	25,000	ITF Galatina, Italy	Clay	(Germany) Kathrin Wörle	(Italy) Giulia Casoni (Czech Republic) Vladimíra Uhlířová	4–6, 0–6
Loss	14.	27 September 2004	25,000	ITF Belgrade, Serbia and Montenegro	Clay	(Russia) Ekaterina Bychkova	(Italy) Giulia Casoni (Croatia) Darija Jurak	0–6, 2–6
Loss	15.	22 November 2004	25,000	ITF Opole, Poland	Carpet (i)	(Belarus) Ekaterina Dzehalevich	(Czech Republic) Lucie Hradecká (Czech Republic) Eva Hrdinová	5–7, 3–6
Loss	16.	26 April 2005	25,000	ITF Taranto, Italy	Clay	(Belarus) Tatiana Poutchek	(Bosnia and Herzegovina) Mervana Jugić-Salkić (Croatia) Darija Jurak	3–6, 7–6^{(3)}, 3–6
Win	15.	27 June 2005	25,000	ITF Båstad, Sweden	Clay	(Ukraine) Olena Antypina	(Argentina) Erica Krauth (Sweden) Hanna Nooni	7–5, 3–6, 6–3
Win	16.	4 July 2005	25,000	Bella Cup, Poland	Clay	(Israel) Yevgenia Savranska	(Czech Republic) Zuzana Hejdová (Poland) Joanna Sakowicz-Kostecka	6–1, 7–5
Win	17.	18 July 2005	25,000	ITF Les Contamines, France	Hard	(Israel) Yevgenia Savransky	(Russia) Nina Bratchikova (Russia) Ekaterina Kosminskaya	6–1, 2–6, 6–4
Loss	17.	23 August 2005	25,000	ITF Moscow, Russia	Clay	(Israel) Yevgenia Savransky	(Russia) Ekaterina Kozhokina (Belarus) Darya Kustova	2–6, 4–6
Win	18.	27 September 2005	50,000	Batumi Ladies Open, Georgia	Hard	(Belarus) Anastasiya Yakimova	(Russia) Anna Bastrikova (Russia) Nina Bratchikova	2–6, 6–2, 7–6^{(9)}
Loss	18.	12 October 2005	25,000	ITF Jersey, UK	Hard (i)	(Republic of Ireland) Kelly Liggan	(Czech Republic) Veronika Chvojková (Slovakia) Stanislava Hrozenská	6–4, 2–6, 5–7
Win	19.	21 November 2005	25,000	ITF Opole, Poland	Carpet (i)	(Switzerland) Timea Bacsinszky	(Czech Republic) Lucie Hradecká (Czech Republic) Gabriela Navrátilová	6–4, 7–6^{(5)}
