= Natalia Nemchinova =

Ukrainian tennis player

Natalia Nemchinova Наталія Нємчинова
- Country (sports): Ukraine
- Born: 10 June 1975 (age 49)
- Turned pro: 1991
- Retired: 2000
- Prize money: $17,569

Singles
- Career record: 42–57
- Career titles: 0 WTA, 1 ITF
- Highest ranking: No. 441 (9 September 1996)

Doubles
- Career record: 77–56
- Career titles: 10 ITF
- Highest ranking: No. 247 (21 August 1995)

Team competitions
- Fed Cup: 0–5

Natalia Nemchinova (Ukrainian: Наталія Нємчинова, born 10 June 1975) is a retired tennis player from Ukraine.

Playing for Ukraine at the Fed Cup, Nemchinova has a win–loss record of 0–5.

== ITF finals ==
$100,000 tournaments
$75,000 tournaments
$50,000 tournaments
$25,000 tournaments
$10,000 tournaments

=== Singles (1–0) ===
Result	No.	Date	Tournament	Surface	Opponent	Score
Win	1.	23 October 1995	Samara, Russia	Carpet (i)	(Russia) Anna Linkova	6–4, 3–6, 7–6^{(7–3)}

=== Doubles (10–5) ===
Result	No.	Date	Tournament	Surface	Partner	Opponents	Score
Win	1.	11 October 1993	Moscow, Russia	Hard (i)	(Russia) Jana Dorodnova	(Belarus) Natalia Noreiko (Belarus) Marina Stets	6–7^{(5–7)}, 6–2, 6–3
Loss	2.	23 May 1994	Łódź, Poland	Clay	(Russia) Evgenia Kulikovskaya	(Argentina) Valeria Strappa (Argentina) Valentina Solari	6–3, 5–7, 4–6
Win	3.	30 May 1994	Bytom, Poland	Clay	(Russia) Evgenia Kulikovskaya	(Ukraine) Talina Beiko (Ukraine) Tanja Tsiganii	6–2, 3–6, 6–2
Win	4.	22 August 1994	Horb, Germany	Clay	(Russia) Evgenia Kulikovskaya	(Czech Republic) Martina Hautová (Slovakia) Simona Nedorostová	6–2, 6–2
Loss	5.	29 August 1994	Bad Nauheim, Germany	Clay	(Russia) Evgenia Kulikovskaya	(Germany) Renata Kochta (Czech Republic) Alena Vašková	3–6, 6–1, 4–6
Win	6.	26 September 1994	Mali Lošinj, Croatia	Clay	(Russia) Olga Ivanova	(Czech Republic) Blanka Kumbárová (Poland) Aleksandra Olsza	6–3, 6–7^{(5–7)}, 7–6^{(7–5)}
Win	7.	5 June 1995	Łódź, Poland	Clay	(Russia) Evgenia Kulikovskaya	(Bulgaria) Teodora Nedeva (Greece) Christina Zachariadou	6–7^{(2–7)}, 6–3, 6–3
Loss	8.	12 June 1995	Bytom, Poland	Clay	(Russia) Evgenia Kulikovskaya	(Bulgaria) Teodora Nedeva (Poland) Katharzyna Teodorowicz	2–6, 2–6
Win	9.	10 July 1995	Olsztyn, Poland	Clay	(Belarus) Marina Stets	(Poland) Katarzyna Malec (Poland) Katarzyna Teodorowicz	6–2, 6–2
Win	10.	17 July 1995	Toruń, Poland	Clay	(Czech Republic) Monika Maštalířová	(Czech Republic) Jana Macurová (Czech Republic) Milena Nekvapilová	6–3, 7–6
Loss	11.	23 October 1995	Samara, Russia	Carpet (i)	(Russia) Anna Linkova	(Russia) Natalia Egorova (Russia) Maria Marfina	1–6, 0–6
Win	12.	30 October 1995	Moscow, Russia	Hard (i)	(Russia) Anna Linkova	(Belarus) Natalia Noreiko (Belarus) Marina Stets	6–2, 2–6, 6–3
Win	13.	20 May 1996	Olsztyn, Poland	Clay	(Belarus) Marina Stets	(Germany) Cornelia Grünes (Australia) Loretta Sheales	0–6, 6–0, 7–5
Win	14.	8 September 1996	Donetsk, Ukraine	Clay	(Russia) Maria Marfina	(Ukraine) Angelina Zdorovitskaia (Ukraine) Anna Zaporozhanova	6–4, 6–2
Loss	15.	13 July 1998	Kharkiv, Ukraine	Clay	(Ukraine) Natalia Bondarenko	(Ukraine) Tatiana Kovalchuk (Belarus) Nadejda Ostrovskaya	1–6, 6–3, 1–6
