= Nataly Cahana =

Israeli tennis player

- Full name: Nataly Cahana-Fleishman
- Native name: נטלי כהנא-פליישמן
- Country (sports): Israel
- Born: 2 December 1978 (age 47)
- Height: 5 ft 5 in (165 cm)
- Plays: Right-handed
- Prize money: $35,695

Singles
- Career record: 93–96
- Career titles: 1 ITF
- Highest ranking: No. 232 (3 May 1999)

Doubles
- Career record: 83–78
- Career titles: 5 ITF
- Highest ranking: No. 179 (5 July 1999)

Team competitions
- Fed Cup: 8–2

Nataly Cahana-Fleishman (Hebrew: נטלי כהנא-פליישמן; born 2 December 1978) is an Israeli former professional tennis player.

== Biography ==
Cahana, a right-handed player from Haifa, competed on the professional tour in the 1990s, primarily on the ITF Circuit.

She reached a best singles ranking of 232 and won a $25k title in Caracas in 1998. As a doubles player, she was ranked as high as 179 in the world and won five ITF titles.

From 1996 to 1999 she featured in eight Fed Cup ties for Israel, mostly in doubles.

Her only WTA Tour main-draw appearance came at the 1999 Tashkent Open, where she and partner Julia Abe made the quarterfinals of the doubles.

In the early 2000s, she played American college tennis for Old Dominion University (ODU) in Norfolk, Virginia. A two-time All-American, she made four NCAA Championship appearances in a row and finished with a team record of 231 career wins, across singles and doubles. In 2007, she began serving ODU as an assistant coach.

== ITF finals ==
$25,000 tournaments
$10,000 tournaments

=== Singles: 3 (1–2) ===
Result	No.	Date	Tournament	Surface	Opponent	Score
Loss	1.	17 March 1996	ITF Tel Aviv, Israel	Hard	(Israel) Hila Rosen	1–6, 1–6
Loss	2.	8 March 1997	ITF Tel Aviv, Israel	Hard	(Switzerland) Miroslava Vavrinec	3–6, 6–7
Loss	1.	4 October 1998	ITF Caracas, Venezuela	Hard	(Austria) Sybille Bammer	6–1, 3–6, 6–3

=== Doubles: 13 (5–8) ===
Result	No.	Date	Tournament	Surface	Partner	Opponents	Score
Loss	1.	22 August 1993	ITF Haifa, Israel	Hard	(Israel) Tzipora Obziler	(Israel) Shiri Burstein (Israel) Hila Rosen	0–6, 4–6
Loss	2.	29 August 1993	ITF Haifa, Israel	Hard	(Israel) Tzipora Obziler	(Israel) Shiri Burstein (Israel) Hila Rosen	5–7, 5–7
Win	1.	4 December 1994	ITF Beersheba, Israel	Hard	(Israel) Oshri Shashua	(North Macedonia) Ivona Mihailova (North Macedonia) Irena Mihailova	2–6, 6–4, 6–0
Loss	3.	3 April 1995	ITF Tiberias, Israel	Hard	(Israel) Oshri Shashua	(Israel) Nelly Barkan (Ukraine) Tessa Shapovalova	4–6, 1–6
Loss	4.	13 August 1995	ITF Southsea, United Kingdom	Grass	(Israel) Oshri Shashua	(United Kingdom) Karen Cross (United Kingdom) Jane Wood	4–6, 5–7
Loss	5.	30 October 1995	ITF Nicosia, Cyprus	Clay	(Israel) Oshri Shashua	(Netherlands) Vanessa Brilleman (Netherlands) Henriëtte van Aalderen	6–3, 6–7^{(2)}, 4–6
Loss	6.	14 July 1996	ITF Vigo, Spain	Clay	(Israel) Hila Rosen	(Spain) Alicia Ortuño (Argentina) Veronica Stele	2–6, 4–6
Win	2.	17 August 1997	ITF Catania, Italy	Hard	(Netherlands) Martine Vosseberg	(Italy) Emanuela Brusati (Italy) Sara Ventura	7–5, 4–6, 6–4
Win	3.	5 October 1997	ITF Coatzacoalcos, Mexico	Hard	(Netherlands) Martine Vosseberg	(United States) Katie Schlukebir (United States) Melissa Zimpfer	4–6, 2–6
Loss	4.	22 November 1997	ITF Jaffa, Israel	Hard	(Netherlands) Maaike Koutstaal	(Israel) Tzipora Obziler (Israel) Anna Smashnova	6–2, 6–1
Win	5.	10 August 1998	ITF İstanbul, Turkey	Hard	(Greece) Eleni Daniilidou	(Turkey) Duygu Akşit Oal (Turkey) Gülberk Gültekin	3–6, 6–3, 6–3
Loss	7.	3 May 1999	ITF Beersheba, Israel	Hard	(Israel) Tzipora Obziler	(Belarus) Nadejda Ostrovskaya (Belarus) Tatiana Poutchek	1–6, 4–6
Loss	8.	31 January 2000	ITF İstanbul, Turkey	Hard	(Serbia and Montenegro) Katarina Mišić	(Belarus) Elena Yaryshka (Russia) Irina Kornienko	3–6, 6–3, 4–6

== See also ==
- List of Israel Fed Cup team representatives
