= Tzipora Obziler =

Israeli tennis player

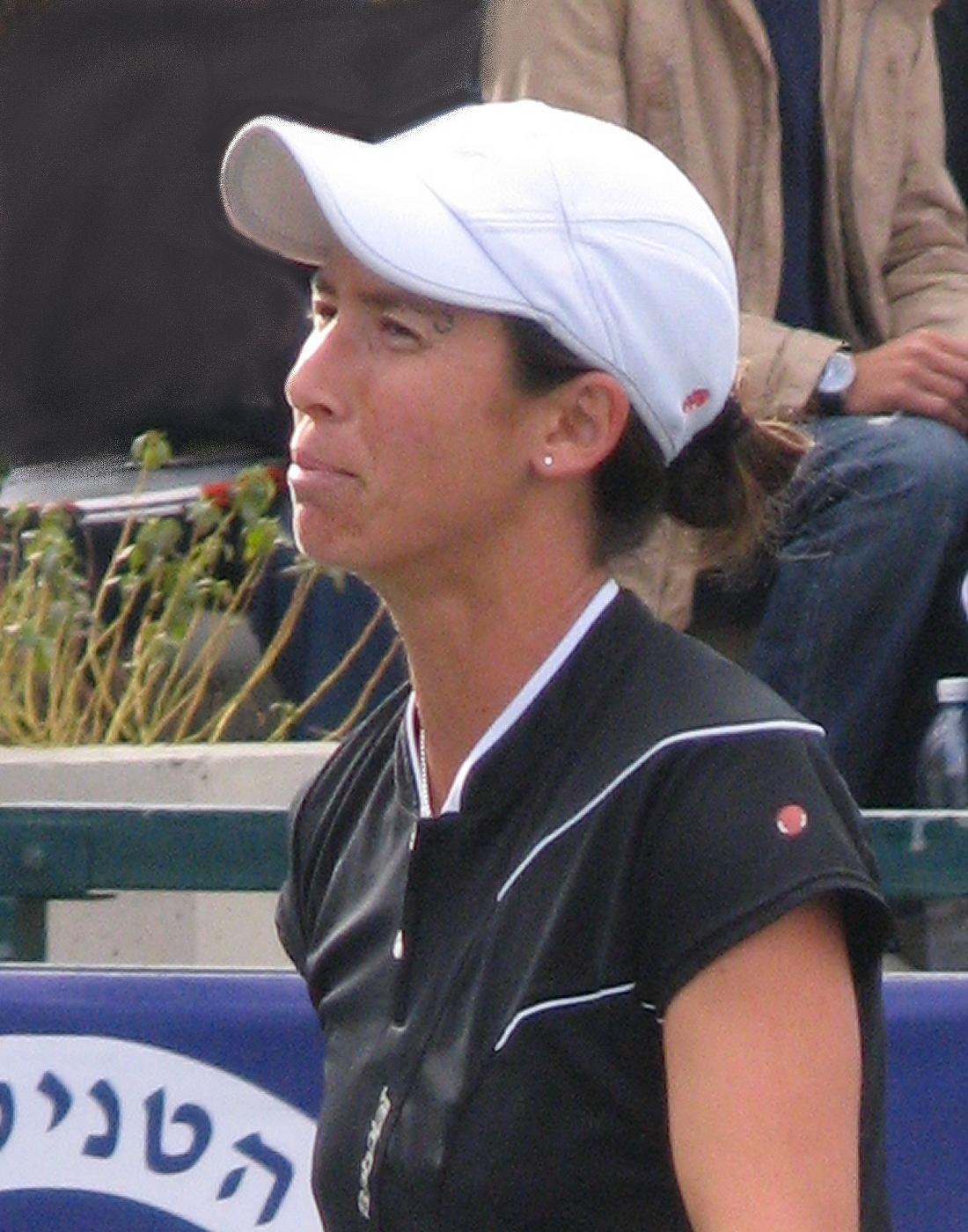
- Native name: ציפורה אובזילר
- Country (sports): Israel
- Residence: Givatayim, Israel
- Born: 19 April 1973 (age 53) Givatayim
- Height: 1.72 m (5 ft 7 1/2 in)
- Turned pro: April 1997
- Retired: August 2009
- Plays: Right-handed (two-handed backhand)
- Prize money: $595,265

Singles
- Career record: 370–229
- Career titles: 0 WTA, 14 ITF
- Highest ranking: No. 75 (9 July 2007)

Grand Slam singles results
- Australian Open: 2R (2004, 2005)
- French Open: 2R (2007)
- Wimbledon: 1R (2007, 2008)
- US Open: 2R (2004)

Other tournaments
- Olympic Games: 1R (2008)

Doubles
- Career record: 151–111
- Career titles: 14 ITF
- Highest ranking: No. 149 (10 April 2000)

Grand Slam doubles results
- Australian Open: 1R (2008)
- French Open: 1R (2007)
- Wimbledon: 1R (2007)

Other doubles tournaments
- Olympic Games: 1R (2008)

Tzipora "Tzipi" Obziler (Hebrew: ציפורה אובזילר; born 19 April 1973) is an Israeli former professional tennis player.

She reached her career-high singles world ranking of No. 75 in on 8 July 2007, and career-high doubles ranking of No. 149 on 10 April 2000.

== Early and personal life ==
She was born in Givatayim, Israel, and is Jewish.

Obziler speaks Hebrew and English. After graduating from high school, she served two years in the Israel Defense Forces (IDF; the Israeli Army). Obziler attended classes at Old Dominion University in Norfolk, Virginia.

She and her girlfriend Hadas have a daughter together. Obziler took a break from professional tennis when the baby was born, and came back to play in 2008. Obziler is studying for a bachelor's degree in education and society, with a specialization in sports, at Ono Academic College.

== Tennis career ==
She won 14 singles and 14 doubles titles on the ITF Women's Circuit. Despite her late run, she played her best tennis over the last few years and qualified for several Grand Slam events.

She started playing tennis at age 10, with friends. In 1997, she won ITF tournaments in singles in Jaffa and Antalya. In 1998, she repeated in Jaffa. In 1999, she won in Guimaraes and Azemeis (both Portugal), and two tournaments in Istanbul, Turkey. In 2000, she won tournaments in Ashkelon and Beersheba in Israel.

In 2002, she won in Mumbai, India, and Nonthaburi, Thailand. In November, she defeated world No. 62, Emmanuelle Gagliardi of Switzerland, in France. In 2003 in India, she had an upset win over world No. 36, Elena Likhovtseva of Russia, in straight sets.

In 2004, she played world No. 1, Justine Henin-Hardenne, in the US Open, winning a set but losing in the second round. In 2005, she won both the singles and doubles (with Shahar Pe'er) titles in Raanana, Israel. She also upset world No. 47, Émilie Loit of France, in the Australian Open in two sets.

In 2006, she managed to get further than round two of a WTA Tour event in her first events of the year at Auckland and at Guangzhou in late September. At the Auckland Open, she reached the quarterfinals with two good wins over Jamea Jackson and the fifth-seeded world No. 27, Katarina Srebotnik of Slovenia, before falling to Daniela Hantuchová. In Guangzhou, she reached semifinals of the tournament, along the way defeating world No. 51, Elena Vesnina of Russia, and world No. 20, Li Na of China, before falling to the fourth-seeded Anabel Medina Garrigues in three sets.

Other than that, she qualified for the Australian Open and various WTA Tour events, she won an ITF title in Washington, D.C., and finally an ITF doubles title in Antalya-Manavgat partnering Romina Oprandi.

In 2007, she beat 56th-ranked Aiko Nakamura of Japan in the round of 16 of the Pattaya City tournament in Thailand. She also made it to the semifinals in Bangalore and Patras. In August at the US Open, she lost in the first round to world No. 86, Caroline Wozniacki of Denmark. On 30 September 2007, she reached her first final on the WTA Tour, in which she lost to Virginie Razzano at the Guangzhou International Women's Open.

She represented Israel at the 2008 Summer Olympics in Beijing, in both singles and (with Shahar Pe'er) doubles.

On 13 August 2009, Obziler convened a press conference to announce her retirement from professional tennis.

== Federation Cup ==
Obziler was 48–30 in Federation Cup matches for the Israel Fed Cup team between 1994 and 2007, including wins in 12 of her most recent 13 matches. Obziler was part of Israel's Federation Cup team that won 10 ties in a row to reach the competition's quarterfinals in 2008 – Israel's greatest Federation Cup achievement in history. Obziler is second ever in the amount of ties played, at 61. She shares the record with compatriot Anna Smashnova.

== WTA career finals ==
=== Singles: 1 (runner-up) ===
Legend
Grand Slam tournaments
Tier I
Tier II
Tier III
Tier IV & V (0–1)

Result	W/L	Date	Tournament	Surface	Opponent	Score
Loss	0–1	Sep 2007	Guangzhou International Open, China	Hard	(France) Virginie Razzano	0–6, 3–6

== ITF Circuit finals ==
=== Singles (14–11) ===
$75,000 tournaments
$50,000 tournaments
$25,000 tournaments
$10,000 tournaments

Result	No.	Date	Tournament	Surface	Opponent	Score
Loss	1.	5 November 1990	Ashkelon, Israel	Clay	(Israel) Ilana Berger	1–6, 3–6
Loss	2.	14 September 1992	Haifa, Israel	Hard	(Israel) Yael Segal	3–6, 2–6
Loss	3.	29 August 1994	Haifa, Israel	Hard	(Israel) Hila Rosen	1–6, 5–7
Loss	4.	5 June 1995	Haifa, Israel	Hard	(Israel) Nelly Barkan	2–6, 2–6
Win	5.	24 February 1997	Jaffa, Israel	Hard	(Hungary) Nóra Köves	7–5, 6–4
Win	6.	2 June 1997	Antalya, Turkey	Hard	(Turkey) Gülberk Gültekin	6–0, 6–4
Loss	7.	17 November 1997	Jaffa, Israel	Hard	(Israel) Anna Smashnova	3–6, 2–6
Loss	8.	14 December 1997	Ismailia, Egypt	Clay	(Tunisia) Selima Sfar	7–5, 5–7, 4–6
Win	9.	16 March 1998	Jaffa, Israel	Hard	(Belarus) Nadejda Ostrovskaya	6–3, 6–3
Loss	10.	1 June 1998	Tashkent, Uzbekistan	Hard	(Austria) Patricia Wartusch	3–6, 2–6
Win	11.	24 May 1999	Guimarães, Portugal	Hard	(Spain) Paula Hermida	6–0, 6–4
Win	12.	30 May 1999	Oliveira de Azeméis, Portugal	Hard	(Romania) Raluca Ciochină	6–1, 6–1
Win	13.	21 June 1999	Istanbul, Turkey	Hard	(Romania) Daniela Cocos	6–0, 6–2
Loss	14.	26 July 1999	Edinburgh, United Kingdom	Clay	(Hungary) Petra Mandula	0–6, 6–4, 5–7
Win	15.	8 August 1999	Istanbul, Turkey	Hard	(Belarus) Nadejda Ostrovskaya	6–0, 7–5
Win	16.	30 October 2000	Ashkelon, Israel	Hard	(Ukraine) Tetiana Luzhanska	4–1, 1–3, 4–1, 4–1
Win	17.	20 November 2000	Beersheba, Israel	Hard	(Israel) Yevgenia Savransky	4–1, 4–0, 2–4, 4–0
Loss	18.	7 July 2002	Los Gatos, United States	Hard	(United States) Ashley Harkleroad	2–6, 2–6
Win	19.	24 November 2002	Mumbai, India	Hard	(Germany) Adriana Barna	6–2, 6–2
Win	20.	1 December 2002	Nonthaburi, Thailand	Hard	(Croatia) Ivana Abramović	6–4, 6–4
Loss	21.	6 April 2004	Dinan, France	Clay (i)	(Switzerland) Timea Bacsinszky	2–6, 1–6
Win	22.	30 May 2005	Ra'anana, Israel	Hard	(Georgia (country)) Margalita Chakhnashvili	6–0, 6–2
Loss	23.	5 December 2005	Ra'anana, Israel	Hard	(Georgia (country)) Margalita Chakhnashvili	3–6, 5–7
Win	24.	1 August 2006	Washington, United States	Hard	(France) Camille Pin	7–5, 2–5 ret.
Win	25.	17 March 2008	Tenerife, Spain	Hard	(Spain) Carla Suárez Navarro	6–2, 6–3

=== Doubles (14–13) ===
Result	No.	Date	Tournament	Surface	Partner	Opponents	Score
Loss	1.	17 May 1993	Tortosa, Spain	Clay	(Israel) Limor Zaltz	(Argentina) Maria Inés Araiz (Argentina) María Fernanda Landa	6–4, 3–6, 4–6
Loss	2.	31 May 1993	Cáceres, Spain	Hard	(Israel) Limor Zaltz	(United States) Eleni Rossides (Austria) Heidi Sprung	6–0, 2–6, 2–6
Loss	3.	9 August 1993	College Park, United States	Hard	(Israel) Limor Zaltz	(United States) Susan Gilchrist (United States) Vickie Paynter	2–6, 3–6
Loss	4.	22 August 1993	Haifa, Israel	Hard	(Israel) Nataly Cahana	(Israel) Shiri Burstein (Israel) Hila Rosen	0–6, 4–6
Loss	5.	29 August 1993	Haifa, Israel	Hard	(Israel) Nataly Cahana	(Israel) Shiri Burstein (Israel) Hila Rosen	5–7, 5–7
Loss	6.	10 October 1994	Burgdorf, Switzerland	Carpet (i)	(Israel) Ilana Berger	(Czech Republic) Lenka Cenková (Czech Republic) Adriana Gerši	6–4, 3–6, 4–6
Loss	7.	11 March 1996	Tel Aviv, Israel	Hard	(Israel) Limor Gabai	(Israel) Shiri Burstein (Israel) Hila Rosen	3–6, 6–7^{(2)}
Loss	8.	20 April 1997	Bari, Italy	Clay	(Israel) Anna Smashnova	(Socialist Federal Republic of Yugoslavia) Sandra Načuk (Socialist Federal Republic of Yugoslavia) Dragana Zarić	4–6, 2–6
Loss	9.	17 November 1997	Jaffa, Israel	Hard	(Israel) Anna Smashnova	(Israel) Nataly Cahana (Netherlands) Maaike Koutstaal	2–6, 1–6
Loss	10.	3 May 1999	Beersheba, Israel	Hard	(Israel) Nataly Cahana	(Belarus) Nadejda Ostrovskaya (Belarus) Tatiana Poutchek	1–6, 4–6
Win	11.	24 May 1999	Guimarães, Portugal	Hard	(Republic of Ireland) Kelly Liggan	(Italy) Sabina Da Ponte (Colombia) Giana Gutiérrez	6–3, 6–1
Win	12.	31 May 1999	Azeméis, Portugal	Hard	(Republic of Ireland) Kelly Liggan	(Colombia) Mariana Mesa (Argentina) Jorgelina Torti	6–4, 4–6, 7–6^{(6)}
Win	13.	19 July 1999	Dublin, Ireland	Carpet	(South Africa) Surina De Beer	(United Kingdom) Hannah Collin (Slovenia) Tina Hergold	7–5, 4–6, 6–2
Win	14.	1 November 1999	Jaffa, Israel	Hard	(Israel) Hila Rosen	(Netherlands) Kristie Boogert (Netherlands) Michelle Gerards	6–4, 1–6, 6–4
Loss	15.	14 February 2000	Midland, United States	Hard (i)	(South Africa) Surina De Beer	(South Africa) Nannie de Villiers (Japan) Rika Hiraki	1–6, 6–1, 1–6
Win	16.	27 March 2000	Norcross, United States	Hard	(Germany) Julia Abe	(South Africa) Jessica Steck (United States) Lindsay Lee-Waters	5–7, 7–6^{(7)}, 6–4
Win	17.	19 May 2002	Tel Aviv, Israel	Hard	(Israel) Hila Rosen	(Australia) Lauren Breadmore (United Kingdom) Natalie Neri	4–6, 6–3, 6–2
Win	18.	1 December 2002	Mumbai, India	Hard	(Serbia and Montenegro) Katarina Mišić	(New Zealand) Shelley Stephens (Germany) Scarlett Werner	6–3, 4–6, 7–5
Win	19.	8 November 2004	Ramat HaSharon, Israel	Hard	(Israel) Danielle Steinberg	(Turkey) Pemra Özgen (Spain) Gabriela Velasco Andreu	7–5, 6–3
Win	20.	21 November 2004	Deauville, France	Clay	(Hungary) Virág Németh	(Germany) Vanessa Henke (Czech Republic) Květa Peschke	6–4, 6–1
Win	21.	5 December 2004	Ra'anana, Israel	Hard	(Israel) Shahar Pe'er	(Morocco) Bahia Mouhtassine (Turkey) İpek Şenoğlu	6–3, 6–0
Win	22.	30 May 2005	Ra'anana, Israel	Hard	(Israel) Shahar Pe'er	(Austria) Daniela Klemenschits (Austria) Sandra Klemenschits	7–6^{(2)}, 1–6, 6–2
Win	23.	7 May 2006	Antalya, Turkey	Clay	(Switzerland) Romina Oprandi	(Croatia) Matea Mezak (Turkey) İpek Şenoğlu	4–6, 6–4, 6–0
Loss	24.	18 November 2006	Deauville, France	Clay (i)	(Italy) Silvia Disderi	(Ukraine) Yuliya Beygelzimer (Ukraine) Yuliana Fedak	5–7, 4–6
Win	25.	19 March 2007	Ra'anana, Israel	Hard	(Israel) Evgenia Linetskaya	(Slovakia) Martina Babáková (Argentina) Veronica Spiegel	6–1, 6–2
Loss	26.	17 March 2008	Tenerife, Spain	Hard	(Bosnia and Herzegovina) Mervana Jugić-Salkić	(France) Julie Coin (France) Violette Huck	4–6, 3–6
Win	27.	31 March 2008	Patras, Greece	Clay	(Belarus) Anastasiya Yakimova	(Spain) María José Martínez Sánchez (Spain) Arantxa Parra Santonja	7–5, 6–1

== See also ==
- List of select Jewish tennis players
