= Hila Rosen =

Israeli tennis player (born 1977)

- Full name: Hila Rosen-Glickstein
- Native name: הילה רוזן
- Country (sports): Israel
- Born: 5 September 1977 (age 48) Haifa, Israel
- Plays: Right-handed
- Prize money: $115,448

Singles
- Career titles: 0 WTA / 7 ITF
- Highest ranking: No. 138 (7 June 1999)

Doubles
- Career record: 0 WTA / 8 ITF
- Highest ranking: No. 157 (6 April 1998)

Hila Rosen-Glickstein (Hebrew: הילה רוזן-גליקשטין; born 5 September 1977) is an Israeli tennis player.

== Biography ==
Born on 5 September 1977, in Haifa, Rosen played in a total of 32 Fed Cup ties for Israel. She debuted in 1994 and had one of her career best wins in the 1997 Fed Cup when she beat Russia's Anna Kournikova.

At age 20, she turned professional, reaching a top ranking of 138 in the world in 1999. She made the round of 16 at the 2000 Tashkent Open and was a regular in grand slam qualifying draws.

In 2002, she made her final Fed Cup appearance, which was a World Group play-off against the United States.

Admitted into the Israel Bar Association in 2006, Rosen is a partner at M. Firon & Co, a law firm in Tel Aviv.

== ITF Circuit finals ==
=== Singles: 10 (7–3) ===
$100,000 tournaments
$75,000 tournaments
$50,000 tournaments
$25,000 tournaments
$10,000 tournaments

Result	No.	Date	Tournament	Surface	Opponent	Score
Win	1.	29 August 1994	Haifa, Israel	Hard	(Israel) Tzipora Obziler	6–1, 7–5
Win	2.	13 November 1995	Cairo, Egypt	Clay	(Austria) Ulrike Priller	6–3, 6–2
Loss	3.	15 January 1996	Woodlands, United States	Hard	(United Kingdom) Claire Taylor	3–6, 6–7^{(5)}
Win	4.	9 March 1996	Haifa, Israel	Hard	(United Kingdom) Julie Pullin	6–4, 6–3
Win	5.	17 March 1996	Tel Aviv, Israel	Hard	(Israel) Nataly Cahana	6–1, 6–1
Loss	6.	22 July 1996	Valladolid, Spain	Hard	(Spain) Magüi Serna	3–6, 1–6
Win	7.	16 November 1997	Mount Gambier, Australia	Hard	(Poland) Aleksandra Olsza	6–1, 6–3
Win	8.	2 August 1998	Winnipeg, Canada	Hard	(Germany) Marketa Kochta	1–6, 6–4, 7–6
Loss	9.	12 April 1999	Las Vegas, United States	Hard	(United States) Erika deLone	3–6, 2–6
Win	10.	9 May 1999	Beersheba, Israel	Hard	(Belarus) Tatiana Poutchek	6–2, 6–1

=== Doubles: 17: (8–9) ===
$100,000 tournaments
$75,000 tournaments
$50,000 tournaments
$25,000 tournaments
$10,000 tournaments

Result	No.	Date	Tournament	Surface	Partner	Opponents	Score
Win	1.	22 August 1994	Haifa 1, Israel	Hard	(Israel) Shiri Burstein	(Israel) Nataly Cahana (Israel) Tzipora Obziler	6–0, 6–4
Win	2.	29 August 1994	Haifa 2, Israel	Hard	(Israel) Shiri Burstein	(Israel) Nataly Cahana (Israel) Tzipora Obziler	7–5, 7–5
Win	3.	17 October 1994	Langenthal, Switzerland	Carpet	(Israel) Shiri Burstein	(Netherlands) Amanda Hopmans (Netherlands) Henriëtte van Aalderen	7–5, 6–4
Loss	4.	13 November 1994	Cairo, Egypt	Clay	(Israel) Shiri Burstein	(Czech Republic) Jindra Gabrisova (Czech Republic) Dominika Gorecká	1–6, 6–3, 1–6
Loss	5.	9 January 1995	Mission, United States	Hard	(Israel) Shiri Burstein	(South Africa) Kim Grant (United States) Claire Sessions Bailey	6–7^{(6)}, 2–6
Win	6.	16 January 1995	San Antonio, United States	Hard	(Israel) Shiri Burstein	(South Africa) Kim Grant (United States) Claire Sessions Bailey	6–2, 6–3
Loss	7.	13 November 1995	Cairo, Egypt	Clay	(Israel) Limor Gabai	(Bulgaria) Antoaneta Pandjerova (Bulgaria) Teodora Nedeva	6–3, 1–6, 6–7^{(8)}
Loss	8.	4 March 1996	Haifa, Israel	Hard	(Israel) Shiri Burstein	(United Kingdom) Julie Pullin (United Kingdom) Kate Warne-Holland	2–6, 4–6
Win	9.	17 March 1996	Tel Aviv, Israel	Hard	(Israel) Shiri Burstein	(Israel) Limor Gabai (Israel) Tzipora Obziler	6–3, 7–6
Loss	10.	14 July 1996	Vigo, Spain	Clay	(Israel) Nataly Cahana	(Spain) Alicia Ortuño (Argentina) Veronica Stele	2–6, 4–6
Loss	11.	16 February 1997	Rogaska Slatina, Slovenia	Carpet (i)	(Serbia and Montenegro) Dragana Zarić	(Austria) Barbara Schwartz (Austria) Patricia Wartusch	1–6, 4–6
Loss	12.	2 June 1997	Tashkent, Uzbekistan	Hard	(Spain) Alicia Ortuño	(United States) Erika deLone (Australia) Nicole Pratt	3–6, 1–6
Loss	13.	14 July 1997	Getxo, Spain	Clay	(Spain) Alicia Ortuño	(Netherlands) Amanda Hopmans (Belgium) Patty Van Acker	5–7, 6–4, 5–7
Win	14.	1 November 1997	Ramat HaSharon, Israel	Hard	(Germany) Kirstin Freye	(Slovenia) Petra Rampre (Slovenia) Katarina Srebotnik	6–1, 6–1
Loss	15.	21 February 1998	Redbridge, United Kingdom	Hard (i)	(Germany) Kirstin Freye	(Hungary) Virág Csurgó (Ukraine) Elena Tatarkova	5–7, 3–6
Win	16.	7 November 1999	Jaffa, Israel	Hard	(Israel) Tzipora Obziler	(Netherlands) Kristie Boogert (Netherlands) Michelle Gerards	6–4, 1–6, 6–4
Win	17.	26 May 2002	Tel Aviv, Israel	Hard	(Israel) Tzipora Obziler	(Australia) Lauren Breadmore (United Kingdom) Natalie Neri	4–6, 6–3, 6–2
