= Tennis at the 2017 Island Games =

- Dates: June 24 – 30
- Host city: Gotland, Sweden
- Venue: Slite; Rackethallen, Visby
- Level: Senior

Tennis at the 2017 Island Games was held on clay courts at Slite and Rackethallen, Visby, Gotland, Sweden in June 2017.

== Medal table ==
* Host nation (Gotland)

Rank	Nation	Gold	Silver	Bronze	Total
1	Jersey	3	1	1	5
2	Isle of Man	2	1	1	4
3	Guernsey	1	1	4	6
4	Menorca	1	1	2	4
5	Gotland*	0	2	1	3
6	Bermuda	0	1	1	2
7	Saare County	0	0	2	2
7	Åland	0	0	2	2
Totals (8 entries)		7	7	14	28

== Results ==
Event	Gold	Silver	Bronze
Men’s singles	Stuart Parker; Jersey	Patrick Ogier; Guernsey	Miguel Alberti Fuster; Menorca
Men’s singles	Stuart Parker; Jersey	Patrick Ogier; Guernsey	Priit Suluste; Saare County
Men’s doubles	Jersey; Stuart Parker; Michael Watkins	Bermuda; Gavin Manders; David Thomas	Saare County; Kert Kilumets; Priit Suluste
Men’s doubles	Jersey; Stuart Parker; Michael Watkins	Bermuda; Gavin Manders; David Thomas	Guernsey; Patrick Ogier; Nico Robinson
Men’s team	Jersey; Jeremy Cross; Stuart Parker; Michael Watkins; Scott Weaver	Gotland; Alec Arho-Havrén; Björn Carlnäs; Filip Engström; Karl Lindberg; Joakim Ulfvebrand	Bermuda; Samuel Butler; Jovan Jordan-Whitter; Gavin Manders; David Thomas
Men’s team	Jersey; Jeremy Cross; Stuart Parker; Michael Watkins; Scott Weaver	Gotland; Alec Arho-Havrén; Björn Carlnäs; Filip Engström; Karl Lindberg; Joakim Ulfvebrand	Guernsey; Patrick Ogier; Nico Robinson; Pieter Robinson; Rob West
Women’s singles	Gemma Negre-Sánchez; Menorca	Laura Feely; Isle of Man	Tsvetelina Havrén; Gotland
Women’s singles	Gemma Negre-Sánchez; Menorca	Laura Feely; Isle of Man	Joanna Dyer; Guernsey
Women’s doubles	Isle of Man; Karen Faragher; Laura Feely	Jersey; Natasha Forrest; Eva Hurst	Åland Islands; Linda Jansson; Malin Ringbom
Women’s doubles	Isle of Man; Karen Faragher; Laura Feely	Jersey; Natasha Forrest; Eva Hurst	Menorca; Tamara Cansado Pons; Sandra Moll Andreu
Mixed doubles	Guernsey; Joanna Dyer; Rob West	Gotland; Alec Arho-Havrén; Tsvetelina Havrén	Isle of Man; Sean Drewry; Karen Faragher
Mixed doubles	Guernsey; Joanna Dyer; Rob West	Gotland; Alec Arho-Havrén; Tsvetelina Havrén	Åland Islands; Peter Forsström; Linda Jansson
Women’s team	Isle of Man; Karen Fargher; Laura Feely; Katie Harris; Elena Snidal; Hannah Sindal	Menorca; Tamara Cansado Pons; Sandra Moll Andreu; Gemma Negre-Sánchez; Belén Vidal Gornes	Jersey; Rebecca Edwards; Natasha Forrest; Eva Hurst; Antonija Sokic
Women’s team	Isle of Man; Karen Fargher; Laura Feely; Katie Harris; Elena Snidal; Hannah Sindal	Menorca; Tamara Cansado Pons; Sandra Moll Andreu; Gemma Negre-Sánchez; Belén Vidal Gornes	Guernsey; Lauren Barker; Helen Bonner-Morgan; Joanna Dyer; Natalie Le Cras
