= Olga Vymetálková =

Czech tennis player

- Country (sports): Czech Republic
- Born: 24 January 1976 (age 50) Czechoslovakia
- Turned pro: 1994
- Retired: 2012
- Prize money: $239,599

Singles
- Career record: 301–257
- Career titles: 6 ITF
- Highest ranking: No. 143 (20 March 2006)

Grand Slam singles results
- Australian Open: Q1 (2002, 2003, 2004, 2006)
- French Open: Q1 (2002, 2003, 2006)
- Wimbledon: Q2 (2003)
- US Open: Q2 (2002, 2004)

Doubles
- Career record: 345–181
- Career titles: 40 ITF
- Highest ranking: No. 82 (13 September 2004)

Grand Slam doubles results
- Australian Open: 1R (2005)
- French Open: 1R (2004)
- Wimbledon: 1R (2004)
- US Open: 1R (2004)

Olga Vymetálková (née Blahotová; born 24 January 1976) is a Czech former tennis player.

She won six singles and 40 doubles titles on the ITF Women's Circuit during her career. On 20 March 2006, Vymetálková reached her best singles ranking of world No. 143. On 13 September 2004, she peaked at No 82 in the WTA doubles rankings.

Vymetálková retired from professional tennis 2012.

== WTA career finals ==
=== Doubles: 2 (runner-ups) ===
Legend Grand Slam (0–0) Tier I (0–0) Tier II (0–0) Tier III, IV & V (0–2)	Finals by surface Hard (0–0) Clay (0–2) Grass (0–0) Carpet (0–0)

Result	Date	Tournament	Surface	Partner	Opponents	Score
Loss	Mar 2004	Mexican Open	Clay	(Czech Republic) Gabriela Chmelinová	(Australia) Lisa McShea (Venezuela) Milagros Sequera	6–2, 6–7^{(5)}, 4–6
Loss	Mar 2004	Portugal Open	Clay	(Czech Republic) Gabriela Chmelinová	(Switzerland) Emmanuelle Gagliardi (Slovakia) Janette Husárová	3–6, 2–6

== ITF Circuit finals ==
Legend
$100,000 tournaments
$75,000 tournaments
$50,000 tournaments
$25,000 tournaments
$10,000 tournaments

=== Singles: 16 (6–10) ===
Result	No.	Date	Tournament	Surface	Opponent	Score
Loss	1.	16 September 1996	ITF Cluj, Romania	Clay	(Germany) Antonela Voina	3–6, 4–6
Loss	2.	27 April 1998	ITF Sofia, Bulgaria	Clay	(Bulgaria) Maria Geznenge	6–4, 2–6, 1–6
Loss	3.	31 August 1998	ITF Hechingen, Germany	Clay	(Germany) Angelika Rösch	4–6, 7–5, 5–7
Win	4.	6 September 1999	ITF Zadar, Croatia	Clay	(Bosnia and Herzegovina) Mervana Jugić-Salkić	6–3, 6–4
Win	5.	27 September 1999	ITF Fiumicino, Italy	Clay	(Hungary) Katalin Miskolczi	6–2, 6–4
Loss	6.	16 January 2000	ITF Boca Raton, United States	Hard	(United States) Lindsay Lee-Waters	2–6, 6–3, 3–6
Win	7.	10 September 2001	ITF Sofia, Bulgaria	Clay	(Russia) Maria Goloviznina	7–6^{(3)}, 6–4
Loss	8.	15 July 2002	ITF Valladolid, Spain	Hard	(Italy) Francesca Lubiani	2–6, 4–6
Win	9.	11 November 2002	ITF Puebla, Mexico	Hard	(Czech Republic) Gabriela Chmelinová	6–1, 4–6, 7–6^{(3)}
Win	10.	17 November 2002	ITF Mexico City	Hard	(United States) Sunitha Rao	7–6^{(2)}, 6–3
Loss	11.	19 April 2005	ITF Bari, Italy	Clay	(Croatia) Darija Jurak	3–6, 2–6
Loss	12.	22 May 2005	ITF Caserta, Italy	Clay	(Croatia) Ivana Lisjak	3–6, 5–7
Loss	13.	5 September 2005	ITF Madrid, Italy	Hard	(Spain) Matilde Muñoz Gonzalves	3–6, 2–6
Win	14.	9 October 2005	ITF Juárez, Mexico	Clay	(Portugal) Frederica Piedade	7–6^{(2)}, 6–2
Loss	15.	16 October 2005	ITF Victoria, Mexico	Hard	(Canada) Aleksandra Wozniak	6–2, 0–6, 4–6
Loss	16.	9 January 2007	ITF Tampa, United States	Hard	(Russia) Alina Jidkova	2–6, 2–6

=== Doubles: 73 (40–33) ===
Result	No.	Date	Tournament	Surface	Partner	Opponents	Score
Loss	1.	13 September 1993	ITF Cluj, Romania	Clay	(Czech Republic) Petra Filipova	(Romania) Isabela Martin (France) Michaela Vulpe-Drissler	5–7, 7–5, 1–6
Win	2.	12 September 1994	ITF Cluj, Romania	Clay	(Czech Republic) Petra Filipova	(Hungary) Kati Kocsis (Hungary) Réka Vidáts	4–6, 6–2, 6–4
Loss	3.	21 August 1995	ITF Valašské Meziříčí, Czech Republic	Clay	(Czech Republic) Jana Macurová	(Czech Republic) Alena Havrlíková (Czech Republic) Jana Lubasová	6–7^{(2)}, 3–6
Loss	4.	18 September 1995	ITF Cluj, Romania	Clay	(Czech Republic) Alena Havrlíková	(Czech Republic) Gabriela Chmelinová (Czech Republic) Sabine Radevicová	3–6, 6–3, 2–6
Win	5.	9 October 1995	ITF Burgdorf, Switzerland	Carpet (i)	(Czech Republic) Jana Macurová	(Netherlands) Debby Haak (Netherlands) Martine Vosseberg	6–1, 6–3
Win	6.	16 October 1995	ITF Langenthal, Switzerland	Carpet (i)	(Czech Republic) Jana Macurová	(Netherlands) Debby Haak (United States) Kristin Osmond	5–7, 6–4, 6–3
Loss	7.	November 13, 1995	Bad Gögging, Germany	Carpet (i)	(Czech Republic) Jana Macurová	(Czech Republic) Eva Melicharová (Czech Republic) Helena Vildová	5–7, 3–6
Win	8.	December 4, 1995	Přerov, Czech Republic	Carpet (i)	(Slovakia) Martina Nedelková	(Czech Republic) Sylva Nesvadbová (Czech Republic) Milena Nekvapilová	5–7, 6–3, 6–4
Loss	9.	December 11, 1995	Vítkovice, Czech Republic	Carpet (i)	(Czech Republic) Milena Nekvapilová	(Czech Republic) Monika Kratochvílová (Slovakia) Martina Nedelková	4–6, 6–3, 3–6
Win	10.	April 22, 1996	Bari, Italy	Clay	(Czech Republic) Jana Macurová	(Italy) Germana Di Natale (Romania) Andreea Ehritt-Vanc	6–4, 4–6, 7–5
Loss	11.	July 29, 1996	Horb, Germany	Clay	(Czech Republic) Monika Kratochvílová	(Czech Republic) Jana Ondrouchová (Czech Republic) Hana Šromová	2–6, 3–6
Win	12.	January 13, 1997	Helsinki, Finland	Hard (i)	(Czech Republic) Gabriela Chmelinová	(Netherlands) Maaike Koutstaal (Russia) Anna Linkova	6–2, 6–1
Loss	13.	March 3, 1997	Buchen, Germany	Clay	(Czech Republic) Jana Macurová	(Germany) Nina Duebbers (Germany) Lisa Fritz	7–5, 3–6, 4–6
Loss	14.	April 21, 1997	Prostějov, Czech Republic	Clay	(Czech Republic) Hana Šromová	(Czech Republic) Sylva Nesvadbová (Czech Republic) Milena Nekvapilová	2–6, 6–7^{(6)}
Win	15.	May 5, 1997	Nitra, Slovakia	Clay	(Czech Republic) Jana Macurová	(Slovakia) Andrea Šebová (Slovakia) Gabriela Voleková	6–0, 0–6, 7–6^{(4)}
Loss	16.	May 12, 1997	Prešov, Slovakia	Clay	(Czech Republic) Jana Macurová	(Czech Republic) Milena Nekvapilová (Czech Republic) Hana Šromová	6–2, 4–6, 2–6
Loss	17.	May 26, 1997	Warsaw, Poland	Clay	(Czech Republic) Jana Ondrouchová	(Czech Republic) Milena Nekvapilová (Czech Republic) Hana Šromová	w/o
Win	18.	September 1, 1997	Cluj, Romania	Clay	(Czech Republic) Blanka Kumbárová	(Romania) Magda Mihalache (Romania) Alice Pirsu	7–6^{(3)}, 4–6, 6–4
Loss	19.	September 8, 1997	Cluj, Romania	Clay	(Romania) Magda Mihalache	(Czech Republic) Pavlina Bartunková (Czech Republic) Helena Fremuthová	4–6, 4–6
Loss	20.	November 2, 1997	Stockholm, Sweden	Hard (i)	(Czech Republic) Jana Macurová	(Sweden) Annica Lindstedt (Sweden) Anna-Karin Svensson	6–3, 5–7, 3–6
Loss	21.	January 12, 1998	Reykjavík, Iceland	Carpet (i)	(Czech Republic) Gabriela Chmelinová	(Netherlands) Kim Kilsdonk (Netherlands) Jolanda Mens	4–6, 7–5, 5–7
Loss	22.	February 2, 1998	Istanbul, Turkey	Hard (i)	(Czech Republic) Hana Šromová	(Hungary) Adrienn Hegedűs (Czech Republic) Gabriela Chmelinová	4–6, 6–4, 2–6
Win	23.	May 3, 1998	Sofia, Bulgaria	Clay	(Czech Republic) Michaela Paštiková	(Bulgaria) Teodora Nedeva (Bulgaria) Desislava Topalova	7–5, 7–6^{(5)}
Win	24.	May 25, 1998	Warsaw, Poland	Clay	(Czech Republic) Jana Ondrouchová	(Italy) Alice Canepa (Italy) Alessia Lombardi	7–6^{(4)}, 6–4
Win	25.	July 27, 1998	Toruń, Poland	Clay	(Czech Republic) Jana Macurová	(Czech Republic) Gabriela Chmelinová (Czech Republic) Petra Plačková	7–6^{(2)}, 6–0
Win	26.	August 24, 1998	Plzeň, Czech Republic	Clay	(Czech Republic) Jana Macurová	(Czech Republic) Gabriela Chmelinová (Czech Republic) Veronika Raimrová	1–6, 6–2, 6–1
Loss	27.	September 21, 1998	Šibenik, Croatia	Hard (i)	(Czech Republic) Blanka Kumbárová	(Croatia) Marijana Kovačević (Slovenia) Katarina Srebotnik	3–6, 1–6
Win	28.	August 28, 1998	Supetar, Croatia	Clay	(Czech Republic) Petra Kučová	(Czech Republic) Blanka Kumbárová (Czech Republic) Renata Kučerová	6–1, 6–2
Loss	29.	November 30, 1998	Přerov, Czech Republic	Carpet (i)	(Czech Republic) Eva Martincová	(Czech Republic) Renata Kučerová (Czech Republic) Libuše Průšová	7–6^{(3)}, 1–6, 2–6
Loss	30.	January 11, 1999	Miami, United States	Hard	(Czech Republic) Gabriela Chmelinová	(Slovenia) Katarina Srebotnik (Slovakia) Zuzana Váleková	6–4, 4–6, 5–7
Win	31.	February 22, 1999	Faro, Portugal	Hard	(Czech Republic) Gabriela Chmelinová	(Spain) Marina Escobar (Netherlands) Debby Haak	6–2, 3–6, 6–4
Win	32.	March 1, 1999	Albufeira, Portugal	Hard	(Czech Republic) Gabriela Chmelinová	(Georgia (country)) Nino Louarsabishvili (Sweden) Kristina Triska	6–3, 6–2
Win	33.	April 5, 1999	Makarska, Croatia	Clay	(Czech Republic) Gabriela Chmelinová	(Germany) Gréta Arn (Hungary) Petra Mandula	0–6, 6–3, 7–6^{(3)}
Win	34.	July 19, 1999	Brussels, Belgium	Clay	(Czech Republic) Gabriela Chmelinová	(Slovakia) Andrea Šebová (Slovakia) Silvia Uríčková	6–3, 6–0
Winner	35.	August 16, 1999	Maribor, Slovenia	Clay	(Czech Republic) Hana Šromová	(Slovakia) Andrea Šebová (Slovakia) Silvia Uríčková	6–4, 6–3
Winner	36.	August 30, 1999	Zadar, Croatia	Clay	(Czech Republic) Jana Macurová	(Netherlands) Natasha Galouza (Italy) Mara Santangelo	6–1, 6–3
Win	37.	September 27, 1999	Fiumicino, Italy	Clay	(Czech Republic) Gabriela Chmelinová	(Austria) Stefanie Haidner (Hungary) Katalin Miskolczi	6–3, 6–3
Win	38.	October 11, 1999	Plzeň, Czech Republic	Clay	(Czech Republic) Gabriela Chmelinová	(Slovakia) Alena Paulenková (Czech Republic) Magdalena Zděnovcová	6–1, 6–2
Winner	39.	November 15, 1999	Schlieren, Switzerland	Carpet (i)	(Czech Republic) Gabriela Chmelinová	(Czech Republic) Hana Šromová (Czech Republic) Helena Vildová	6–2, 4–6, 7–5
Loss	40.	January 10, 2000	Boca Raton, United States	Hard	(Czech Republic) Gabriela Chmelinová	(Japan) Maiko Inoue (China) Li Ting	6–4, 2–6, 3–6
Loss	41.	7 February 2000	Ljubljana, Slovenia	Carpet (i)	(Czech Republic) Hana Šromová	(Hungary) Adrienn Hegedűs (Belarus) Nadejda Ostrovskaya	5–7, 3–6
Winner	42.	March 13, 2000	Lisbon, Portugal	Clay	(Czech Republic) Gabriela Chmelinová	(Russia) Ekaterina Kozhokina (Russia) Marina Samoilenko	6–1, 6–0
Loss	43.	November 13, 2000	Stupava, Slovakia	Hard (i)	(Czech Republic) Gabriela Chmelinová	(Germany) Susi Bensch (Germany) Stefanie Weis	1–4, 4–5^{(2)}, 3–5
Winner	44.	December 11, 2000	Mallorca, Spain	Clay	(Czech Republic) Gabriela Chmelinová	(Czech Republic) Iveta Benešová (Czech Republic) Lenka Novotná	5–3, 2–4, 0–4, 4–1, 4–2
Winner	45.	February 12, 2001	Faro, Portugal	Hard	(Czech Republic) Gabriela Chmelinová	(Austria) Daniela Klemenschits (Austria) Sandra Klemenschits	6–0, 6–2
Loss	46.	May 28, 2001	Doksy, Czech Republic	Clay	(Czech Republic) Gabriela Chmelinová	(Czech Republic) Milena Nekvapilová (Czech Republic) Hana Šromová	6–2, 4–6, 1–6
Winner	47.	August 21, 2001	Maribor, Slovenia	Clay	(Czech Republic) Gabriela Chmelinová	(Serbia and Montenegro) Katarina Mišić (Spain) Mariam Ramon Climent	6–2, 6–2
Winner	48.	September 10, 2001	Sofia, Bulgaria	Clay	(Czech Republic) Magdalena Zděnovcová	(Ukraine) Olena Antypina (Ukraine) Yuliana Fedak	6–3, 6–3
Winner	49.	October 1, 2001	Plzeň, Czech Republic	Clay	(Czech Republic) Gabriela Chmelinová	(Austria) Daniela Klemenschits (Austria) Sandra Klemenschits	6–2, 6–3
Winner	50.	December 3, 2001	Prague, Czech Republic	Carpet (i)	(Czech Republic) Gabriela Chmelinová	(Czech Republic) Renata Kučerová (Czech Republic) Zuzana Hejdová	6–2, 6–3
Loss	51.	March 18, 2002	Juárez, Mexico	Clay	(Czech Republic) Magdalena Zděnovcová	(Russia) Maria Kondratieva (Australia) Anastasia Rodionova	3–6, 0–6
Loss	52.	May 13, 2002	Szczecin, Poland	Clay	(Czech Republic) Gabriela Chmelinová	(Venezuela) Milagros Sequera (Canada) Vanessa Webb	7–6^{(5)}, 5–7, 3–6
Winner	53.	June 10, 2002	Vaduz, Liechtenstein	Clay	(Czech Republic) Gabriela Chmelinová	(Ukraine) Yevgenia Savranska (Germany) Stefanie Weis	7–5, 6–1
Win	54.	September 2, 2002	Denain, France	Clay	(Czech Republic) Gabriela Chmelinová	(Ukraine) Yuliya Beygelzimer (Luxembourg) Claudine Schaul	6–3, 6–0
Loss	55.	October 21, 2002	Opole, Poland	Carpet (i)	(Czech Republic) Gabriela Chmelinová	(Czech Republic) Eva Martincová (Czech Republic) Magdalena Zděnovcová	5–7, 6–7^{(5)}
Win	56.	November 11, 2002	Puebla, Mexico	Hard	(Czech Republic) Gabriela Chmelinová	(Argentina) Jorgelina Cravero (Mexico) Melissa Torres Sandoval	6–1, 4–6, 7–6^{(4)}
Win	57.	18 November 2002	ITF Mexico City	Hard	(Czech Republic) Gabriela Chmelinová	(Slovenia) Tina Hergold (Canada) Vanessa Webb	3–6, 6–3, 6–4
Loss	58.	27 January 2003	ITF Ortisei, Italy	Carpet (i)	(Czech Republic) Gabriela Chmelinová	(Germany) Vanessa Henke (Luxembourg) Claudine Schaul	1–6, 2–6
Loss	59.	14 September 2003	ITF Bordeaux, France	Clay	(Czech Republic) Iveta Benešová	(Estonia) Maret Ani (Czech Republic) Libuše Průšová	3–6, 4–6
Win	60.	20 October 2003	ITF Opole, Poland	Carpet (i)	(Czech Republic) Gabriela Chmelinová	(Czech Republic) Zuzana Hejdová (Czech Republic) Hana Šromová	6–4, 6–3
Loss	61.	25 November 2003	ITF Prague, Czech Republic	Carpet (i)	(Czech Republic) Gabriela Chmelinová	(Bosnia and Herzegovina) Mervana Jugić-Salkić (Croatia) Darija Jurak	5–7, 7–6^{(6)}, 3–6
Winner	62.	26 January 2004	ITF Belfort, France	Hard (i)	(Czech Republic) Gabriela Chmelinová	(Netherlands) Kim Kilsdonk (France) Sophie Lefèvre	6–3, 6–2
Winner	63.	2 February 2004	ITF Ortisei, Italy	Carpet (i)	(Czech Republic) Gabriela Chmelinová	(Bulgaria) Lubomira Bacheva (Germany) Angelika Rösch	6–1, 6–3
Loss	64.	17 February 2004	ITF Redbridge, UK	Hard (i)	(Czech Republic) Gabriela Chmelinová	(Republic of Ireland) Claire Curran (Netherlands) Kim Kilsdonk	3–6, 6–3, 6–7^{(10)}
Win	65.	11 October 2004	ITF Juárez, Mexico	Hard	(France) Kildine Chevalier	(Brazil) Larissa Carvalho (Brazil) Jenifer Widjaja	6–3, 6–2
Win	66.	22 May 2005	ITF Caserta, Italy	Clay	(Argentina) Soledad Esperón	(Croatia) Ivana Lisjak (Croatia) Nadja Pavić	7–5, 7–5
Loss	67.	4 October 2005	ITF Juárez, Mexico	Clay	(Argentina) Soledad Esperón	(Argentina) María José Argeri (Brazil) Letícia Sobral	6–7^{(1)}, 3–6
Loss	68.	15 November 2005	Czech Indoor Open, Czech Republic	Hard (i)	(Czech Republic) Eva Hrdinová	(Czech Republic) Lucie Hradecká (Czech Republic) Libuše Průšová	3–6, 6–3, 3–6
Loss	69.	4 December 2005	ITF Palm Beach Gardens, United States	Clay	(Czech Republic) Kateřina Böhmová	(Chinese Taipei) Chan Chin-wei (Chinese Taipei) Hsieh Su-wei	6–7^{(2–7)}, 5–7
Win	70.	22 February 2006	Biberach Open, Germany	Hard (i)	(Czech Republic) Lucie Hradecká	(Croatia) Darija Jurak (Czech Republic) Renata Voráčová	6–2, 4–6, 6–7^{(4)}
Loss	71.	12 June 2006	Zagreb Ladies Open, Croatia	Clay	(Czech Republic) Lucie Hradecká	(Czech Republic) Michaela Paštiková (Czech Republic) Hana Šromová	w/o
Loss	72.	14 January 2007	ITF Tampa, United States	Hard	(Czech Republic) Andrea Hlaváčková	(Germany) Angelika Bachmann (United States) Tetiana Luzhanska	5–7, 2–6
Win	73.	4 February 2007	ITF Ortisei, Italy	Carpet (i)	(Ukraine) Mariya Koryttseva	(Belarus) Darya Kustova (Belarus) Tatiana Poutchek	6–3, 4–6, 6–3
