= Jana Lubasová =

Czech tennis player

- Country (sports): Czech Republic
- Born: 22 November 1979 (age 45)
- Prize money: $14,594

Singles
- Career record: 58–52
- Highest ranking: No. 360 (25 Sep 1995)

Doubles
- Career record: 35–26
- Career titles: 5 ITF
- Highest ranking: No. 258 (25 Sep 1995)

Jana Lubasová (born 22 November 1979) is a Czech former professional tennis player.

Lubasová had a career high singles ranking of 360 in the world and qualified for the main draw of one WTA Tour tournament, the 1995 Prague Open. As a doubles player she had a top ranking of 258, winning five ITF titles.

In 2007 she was a doubles world champion in the sport of racketlon.

== ITF finals ==
=== Singles: 2 (0–2) ===
Outcome	No.	Date	Tournament	Surface	Opponent	Score
Runner-up	1.	25 June 1995	Staré Splavy, Czech Republic	Clay	(Czech Republic) Libuše Průšová	0–6, 1–6
Runner-up	2.	27 July 1997	Lido di Camaiore, Italy	Clay	(Italy) Federica Fortuni	3–6, 6–4, 3–6

=== Doubles: 5 (5–0) ===
Outcome	No.	Date	Tournament	Surface	Partner	Opponents	Score
Winner	1.	29 January 1995	Båstad, Sweden	Hard	(Czech Republic) Sandra Kleinová	(Finland) Linda Jansson (Sweden) Anna-Karin Svensson	6–4, 7–6
Winner	2.	2 July 1995	Båstad 2, Sweden	Clay	(Czech Republic) Karolina Bakalarová	(Denmark) Sandra Olsen (Germany) Claudia Timm	6–3, 6–2
Winner	3.	27 August 1995	Valašské Meziříčí, Czech Republic	Clay	(Czech Republic) Alena Havrlíková	(Czech Republic) Olga Blahotová (Czech Republic) Jana Macurová	7–6^{(2)}, 6–3
Winner	4.	9 May 1998	Prešov, Slovakia	Clay	(Czech Republic) Magdalena Zděnovcová	(Ukraine) Tatiana Kovalchuk (Ukraine) Anna Zaporozhanova	6–2, 6–4
Winner	5.	18 July 1998	Civitanova Marche, Italy	Clay	(Czech Republic) Magdalena Zděnovcová	(Colombia) Giana Gutiérrez (Netherlands) Debby Haak	6–3, 6–4
