= Nanne Dahlman =

Finnish tennis player

- Country (sports): Finland
- Born: 7 September 1970 (age 54); Helsinki, Finland
- Height: 1.63 m (5 ft 4 in)
- Plays: Left-handed (two-handed backhand)
- Prize money: $344,314

Singles
- Career record: 190-144
- Career titles: 0 WTA, 7 ITF
- Highest ranking: No. 59 (1 February 1993)

Grand Slam singles results
- Australian Open: 3R (1993, 1996)
- French Open: 1R (1991, 1992, 1993)
- Wimbledon: 2R (1992, 1993)
- US Open: 3R (1992)

Doubles
- Career record: 99-106
- Career titles: 0 WTA, 6 ITF
- Highest ranking: No. 52 (24 June 1996)

Grand Slam doubles results
- Australian Open: 3R (1996)
- French Open: 2R (1995, 1996)
- Wimbledon: 1R (1993, 1995, 1996)
- US Open: 1R (1992, 1994, 1995, 1996)

Nanne Dahlman (born 7 September 1970) is a retired Finnish professional tennis player, active in the 1990s.

She reached the third round of three grand slam tournaments:

- US Open 1992 (lost to Steffi Graf)
- Australian Open 1993 (lost to Nathalie Tauziat)
- Australian Open 1996 (lost to Lindsay Davenport)

She never won a WTA tournament, but she won 13 ITF tournaments.

== ITF finals ==
=== Singles (7–3) ===
$100,000 tournaments
$75,000 tournaments
$50,000 tournaments
$25,000 tournaments
$10,000 tournaments

Result	No.	Date	Tournament	Surface	Opponent	Score
Win	1.	30 January 1989	Danderyd, Sweden	Hard	(Sweden) Helena Dahlström	4–6, 6–1, 6–4
Loss	2.	6 February 1989	Stavanger, Norway	Hard	(Sweden) Anna-Karin Olsson	3–6, 3–6
Win	3.	29 May 1989	Florence, Italy	Clay	(France) Isabelle Crudo	6–3, 7–6^{(8–6)}
Loss	4.	5 June 1989	Milan, Italy	Clay	(New Zealand) Ruth Seeman	6–7, 3–6
Win	5.	29 January 1990	Danderyd, Sweden	Hard	(Sweden) Maria Strandlund	6–3, 6–3
Loss	6.	19 April 1993	Bari, Italy	Clay	(France) Lea Ghirardi	6–4, 5–7, 1–6
Win	7.	5 July 1993	Lohja, Finland	Clay	(Denmark) Karin Ptaszek	6–2, 7–5
Win	8.	4 July 1994	Lohja, Finland	Clay	(Belgium) Gaelle Taton	6–3, 6–2
Win	9.	5 February 1995	Coburg, Germany	Hard (i)	(Czech Republic) Helena Vildová	3–6, 6–3, 6–3
Win	10.	3 July 1995	Lohja, Finland	Clay	(Denmark) Karin Ptaszek	7–6^{(7–4)}, 6–1

=== Doubles (6-5) ===
Result	No.	Date	Tournament	Surface	Partner	Opponents	Score
Loss	1.	5 September 1988	Agliana, Italy	Clay	(Finland) Anne Aallonen	(Italy) Marzia Grossi (Italy) Barbara Romanò	6–4, 6–7, 4–6
Loss	2.	17 April 1989	Caserta, Italy	Hard	(Australia) Kate McDonald	(Soviet Union) Eugenia Maniokova (Soviet Union) Natalia Medvedeva	4–6, 4–6
Win	3.	29 May 1989	Florence, Italy	Clay	(South Africa) Michelle Anderson	(Italy) Nathalie Baudone (Italy) Caterina Nozzoli	6–3, 6–3
Loss	4.	19 June 1989	Brindisi, Italy	Clay	(Australia) Rennae Stubbs	(Argentina) Florencia Labat (United States) Erika deLone	3–6, 6–7
Loss	5.	14 August 1989	Budapest, Hungary	Clay	(West Germany) Silke Frankl	(Czechoslovakia) Hana Fukárková (Czechoslovakia) Denisa Krajčovičová	6–4, 3–6, 3–6
Win	6.	28 August 1989	Arzachena, Italy	Hard	(Finland) Anne Aallonen	(Spain) Rosa Bielsa (Spain) Janet Souto	6–1, 6–1
Win	7.	2 September 1991	Arzachena, Italy	Hard	(Czechoslovakia) Jana Pospíšilová	(Israel) Ilana Berger (Australia) Louise Pleming	3–6, 6–3, 6–1
Win	8.	27 June 1994	Plovdiv, Bulgaria	Clay	(Slovakia) Janette Husárová	(Czech Republic) Kateřina Šišková (Czech Republic) Lenka Němečková	6–4, 6–4
Win	9.	16 January 1995	Turku, Finland	Hard	(Finland) Petra Thorén	(Finland) Linda Jansson (Sweden) Anna-Karin Svensson	6–3, 6–4
Win	10.	12 August 1996	Bronx, United States	Hard	(United Kingdom) Clare Wood	(South Africa) Liezel Horn (Greece) Christína Papadáki	6–2, 6–3
Loss	11.	3 November 1996	Stockholm, Sweden	Hard (i)	(Sweden) Maria Strandlund	(Czech Republic) Sandra Kleinová (Czech Republic) Helena Vildová	5–7, 4–6
