= Debby Haak =

Dutch tennis player

- Country (sports): Netherlands
- Born: 25 February 1977 (age 48)
- Plays: Right-handed
- Prize money: $41,679

Singles
- Career record: 97–106
- Career titles: 0
- Highest ranking: No. 388 (19 October 1998)

Doubles
- Career record: 187–109
- Career titles: 17 ITF
- Highest ranking: No. 154 (12 June 2000)

Debby Haak (born 25 February 1977) is a former tennis player from the Netherlands. She turned professional at the age of 18.

She made her WTA Tour main-draw debut at the 2000 Heineken Trophy after she received a wild card into the doubles draw. In her career, she won 17 ITF doubles titles and achieved a highest doubles ranking of 154 in the world.

== ITF finals ==
$50,000 tournaments
$25,000 tournaments
$10,000 tournaments

=== Singles (0–2) ===
Result	No.	Date	Tournament	Surface	Opponent	Score
Loss	1.	4 August 1996	Catania, Italy	Clay	(Italy) Giulia Casoni	6–4, 3–6, 4–6
Loss	2.	18 August 1996	Nicolosi, Italy	Clay	(Czech Republic) Lucie Steflová	6–7, 2–6

=== Doubles (17–22) ===
Result	No.	Date	Tournament	Surface	Partner	Opponents	Score
Win	1.	12 June 1995	Bossonnens, Switzerland	Clay	(Belgium) Patty Van Acker	(Netherlands) Stephanie Gomperts (Netherlands) Henriëtte van Aalderen	6–7, 6–3, 7–5
Loss	2.	9 October 1995	Burgdorf, Switzerland	Carpet (i)	(Netherlands) Martine Vosseberg	(Czech Republic) Jana Macurová (Czech Republic) Olga Vymetálková	1–6, 3–6
Loss	3.	16 October 1995	Langenthal, Switzerland	Carpet (i)	(United States) Kristin Osmond	(Czech Republic) Jana Macurová (Czech Republic) Olga Vymetálková	7–5, 4–6, 3–6
Win	4.	23 June 1996	Klosters, Switzerland	Clay	(Belgium) Patty Van Acker	(Germany) Silke Frankl (Austria) Ursula Svetlik	6–3, 7–6
Win	5.	24 June 1996	Velp, Netherlands	Clay	(Netherlands) Marielle Bruens	(Israel) Nelly Barkan (Netherlands) Martine Vosseberg	3–6, 6–4, 6–2
Win	6.	7 July 1996	Heerhugowaard, Netherlands	Clay	(Netherlands) Marielle Bruens	(Germany) Sabine Gerke (Australia) Anna Klim	1–6, 6–0, 6–2
Loss	7	14 July 1996	Amersfoort, Netherlands	Clay	(Netherlands) Marielle Bruens	(Japan) Tomoe Hotta (Denmark) Sandra Olsen	3–6, 4–6
Loss	8.	5 August 1996	Catania, Italy	Clay	(Netherlands) Franke Joosten	(Italy) Tathiana Garbin (San Marino) Francesca Guardigli	2–6, 5–7
Loss	9.	15 September 1996	Marseille, France	Clay	(Italy) Alice Canepa	(Denmark) Sofie Albinus (Denmark) Karin Ptaszek	7–5, 5–7, 4–6
Loss	10.	24 November 1996	Ismailia, Egypt	Clay	(Israel) Shiri Burstein	(Bulgaria) Teodora Nedeva (Slovenia) Katarina Srebotnik	4–6, 4–6
Win	11.	13 July 1997	Amersfoort, Netherlands	Clay	(Spain) Eva Bes	(Australia) Anna Klim (Czech Republic) Zuzana Lešenarová	4–3 ret.
Loss	12.	7 September 1997	Bad Nauheim, Germany	Clay	(Netherlands) Maaike Koutstaal	(Sweden) Annica Lindstedt (Argentina) Luciana Masante	2–6, 2–6
Loss	13.	19 April 1998	Galatina, Italy	Clay	(Slovakia) Silvia Uríčková	(Spain) Rosa María Andrés Rodríguez (Spain) Noelia Serra	4–6, 1–6
Win	14.	10 May 1998	Elvas, Portugal	Hard	(Spain) Rosa María Andrés Rodríguez	(Spain) Marina Escobar (Spain) Paula Hermida	w/o
Loss	15.	19 July 1998	Civitanova, Italy	Clay	(Colombia) Giana Gutiérrez	(Czech Republic) Magdalena Zděnovcová (Czech Republic) Jana Lubasová	3–6, 4–6
Win	16.	20 September 1998	Constanța, Romania	Clay	(Netherlands) Jolanda Mens	(Georgia (country)) Nino Louarsabishvili (Romania) Alice Pirsu	6–3, 7–6
Loss	17.	7 November 1998	Moulins, France	Hard (i)	(Netherlands) Andrea van den Hurk	(Switzerland) Diane Asensio (Uzbekistan) Iroda Tulyaganova	5–7, 6–2, 2–6
Loss	18.	28 February 1999	Faro, Portugal	Hard (i)	(Spain) Marina Escobar	(Czech Republic) Gabriela Chmelinová (Czech Republic) Olga Vymetálková	2–6, 6–3, 4–6
Loss	19.	25 April 1999	Bari, Italy	Clay	(Colombia) Giana Gutiérrez	(Netherlands) Lotty Seelen (Netherlands) Susanne Trik	4–6, 3–6
Loss	20.	13 June 1999	Biel, Switzerland	Clay	(Netherlands) Andrea van den Hurk	(Australia) Mireille Dittmann (Australia) Natalie Dittmann	5–7, 6–1, 1–6
Win	21.	21 June 1999	Alkmaar, Netherlands	Clay	(Austria) Stefanie Haidner	(Italy) Jolanda Mens (Netherlands) Anouk Sterk	6–4, 1–6, 6–3
Win	22.	5 July 1999	Amersfoort, Netherlands	Clay	(Netherlands) Natasha Galouza	(Austria) Stefanie Haidner (Hungary) Adrienn Hegedűs	7–6^{(7–2)}, 6–4
Win	23.	25 July 1999	Valladolid, Spain	Hard	(Netherlands) Andrea van den Hurk	(Czech Republic) Lenka Cenková (Germany) Meike Fröhlich	2–6, 6–3, 7–6
Win	24.	5 September 1999	Spoleto, Italy	Clay	(Netherlands) Andrea van den Hurk	(Argentina) Clarisa Fernández (Italy) Francesca Schiavone	6–1, 6–1
Win	25.	30 August 1999	Fano, Italy	Clay	(Netherlands) Andrea van den Hurk	(Hungary) Katalin Marosi (Spain) Alicia Ortuño	6–1, 6–4
Win	26.	19 September 1999	Reggio Calabria, Italy	Clay	(Netherlands) Andrea van den Hurk	(Italy) Alice Canepa (Italy) Tathiana Garbin	6–1, 6–1
Win	27.	31 January 2000	Mallorca, Spain	Clay	(Austria) Stefanie Haidner	(France) Aurélie Védy (Sweden) Maria Wolfbrandt	6–4, 3–6, 6–4
Win	28.	22 April 2000	San Severo, Italy	Clay	(Netherlands) Lotty Seelen	(Romania) Oana-Elena Golimbioschi (Bulgaria) Svetlana Krivencheva	6–4, 6–3
Loss	29.	4 March 2001	Bendigo, Australia	Hard	(Netherlands) Jolanda Mens	(New Zealand) Leanne Baker (New Zealand) Shelley Stephens	3–6, 2–6
Loss	30.	18 March 2001	Benalla, Australia	Grass	(Netherlands) Jolanda Mens	(Australia) Monique Adamczak (Australia) Samantha Stosur	3–6, 5–7
Win	31.	1 April 2001	Benalla, Australia	Grass	(Netherlands) Jolanda Mens	(Australia) Beti Sekulovski (Australia) Nicole Sewell	6–4, 6–3
Loss	32.	17 June 2001	Raalte, Netherlands	Clay	(Netherlands) Jolanda Mens	(Federal Republic of Yugoslavia) Milica Koprivica (Netherlands) Anouk Sterk	2–6, 7–5, 6–7^{(2–7)}
Loss	33.	1 July 2001	Alkmaar, Netherlands	Clay	(Netherlands) Jolanda Mens	(Netherlands) Susanne Trik (Netherlands) Anouk Sterk	4–6, 4–6
Loss	34.	26 August 2001	Enschede, Netherlands	Clay	(Netherlands) Jolanda Mens	(Netherlands) Natalia Galouza (Netherlands) Lotty Seelen	0–6, 6–2, 5–7
Loss	35.	9 September 2001	Denain, France	Clay	(Netherlands) Jolanda Mens	(France) Émilie Loit (Kazakhstan) Irina Selyutina	1–6, 3–6
Loss	36.	30 June 2002	Rabat, Morocco	Clay	(Netherlands) Jolanda Mens	(Russia) Gulnara Fattakhetdinova (Russia) Maria Kondratieva	3–6, 5–7
Loss	37.	19 August 2002	Enschede, Netherlands	Clay	(Austria) Daniela Klemenschits	(Austria) Daniela Kix (Germany) Annette Kolb	1–6, 5–7
Loss	38.	8 December 2002	Nonthaburi, Thailand	Hard	(United States) Amanda Augustus	(Croatia) Ivana Abramović (Japan) Remi Tezuka	2–6, 1–6
Win	39.	2 February 2003	Rockford, Illinois, United States	Hard (i)	(Netherlands) Seda Noorlander	(Czech Republic) Michaela Paštiková (Italy) Valentina Sassi	7–5, 6–4

== Unplayed final ==
Outcome	No.	Date	Tournament	Surface	Partner	Opponents	Score
NP	—	12 July 1998	Amersfoort, Netherlands	Clay	(Colombia) Giana Gutiérrez	(Netherlands) Yvette Basting (Netherlands) Henriëtte van Aalderen	NP
