= Magdalena Zděnovcová =

Czech tennis player

- Country (sports): Czech Republic
- Born: 17 May 1978 (age 46); Czechoslovakia
- Turned pro: 1995
- Retired: 2006
- Prize money: $91,856

Singles
- Career record: 222–151
- Career titles: 3 ITF
- Highest ranking: No. 195 (15 September 2003)

Grand Slam singles results
- French Open: Q2 (2003)
- Wimbledon: Q1 (2002, 2003)
- US Open: Q3 (2003)

Doubles
- Career record: 121–104
- Career titles: 8 ITF
- Highest ranking: No. 189 (18 December 2000)

Magdalena Zděnovcová (born 17 May 1978) is a former Czech tennis player.

Zděnovcová, who won a total of eleven ITF tournaments in her career, reached a singles ranking high of world No. 195 in September 2003.

== ITF finals ==
Legendc
$25,000 tournaments
$10,000 tournaments

=== Singles (3–10) ===
Result	No.	Date	Location	Surface	Opponent	Score
Loss	1.	15 September 1996	Zadar, Croatia	Clay	(Czech Republic) Michaela Paštiková	6–4, 3–6, 3–6
Win	1.	2 February 1997	Rungsted, Denmark	Carpet (i)	(Germany) Kirstin Freye	7–6^{(7–5)}, 7–6^{(7–1)}
Loss	2.	9 March, 1997	Buchen, Germany	Carpet (i)	(Germany) Miriam Schnitzer	2–6, 6–4, 5–7
Win	2.	14 June 1998	Lenzerheide, Switzerland	Clay	(Belgium) Patty Van Acker	1–6, 7–6^{(7–2)}, 6–4
Loss	3.	19 July 1998	Civitanova Marche, Italy	Clay	(Czech Republic) Zuzana Ondrášková	2–6, 2–6
Win	3.	30 January 2000	Båstad, Sweden	Hard (i)	(Czech Republic) Helena Vildová	6–3, 0–6, 6–4
Loss	4.	23 July 2000	Brussels, Belgium	Clay	(Netherlands) Anousjka van Exel	4–6, 0–6
Loss	5.	19 November 2000	Stupava, Slovakia	Hard (i)	(Romania) Ioana Gașpar	3–5, 4–5^{(2)}, 2–4
Loss	6.	4 February 2001	Istanbul, Turkey	Hard (i)	(Hungary) Melinda Czink	7–5, 1–6, 2–6
Loss	7.	29 July 2001	Pamplona, Spain	Hard (i)	(Germany) Nina Dübbers	3–6, 6–3, 1–6
Loss	8.	9 December 2001	Prague, Czech Republic	Hard (i)	(Czech Republic) Libuše Průšová	3–6, 3–6
Loss	9.	16 February 2003	Southampton, England	Hard (i)	(Croatia) Karolina Šprem	1–6, 0–3 ret.
Loss	10.	16 March 2003	Kaunas, Lithuania	Hard (i)	(Czech Republic) Michaela Paštiková	3–6, 3–6

=== Doubles (8–9) ===
Outcome	No.	Date	Location	Surface	Partner	Opponents	Score
Winner	1.	18 August 1996	Nicolosi, Italy	Hard	(Czech Republic) Lucie Steflová	(Netherlands) Franke Joosten (Netherlands) Annemarie Mikkers	6–3, 6–4
Runner-up	1.	19 April 1998	Cagnes-sur-Mer, France	Hard	(Netherlands) Yvette Basting	(United Kingdom) Helen Crook (United Kingdom) Victoria Davies	3–6, 3–6
Winner	2.	9 May 1998	Prešov, Slovakia	Clay	(Czech Republic) Jana Lubasová	(Ukraine) Tatiana Kovalchuk (Ukraine) Anna Zaporozhanova	6–2, 6–4
Winner	3.	31 May 1998	Salzburg, Austria	Clay	(Czech Republic) Lucie Steflová	(Germany) Christina Fitz (Germany) Stefanie Weis	6–1, 6–4
Winner	4.	18 July 1998	Civitanova, Italy	Clay	(Czech Republic) Jana Lubasová	(Colombia) Giana Gutiérrez (Netherlands) Debby Haak	6–3, 6–4
Runner-up	2.	23 May 1999	Salzburg, Austria	Clay	(Belgium) Cindy Schuurmans	(Czech Republic) Milena Nekvapilová (Czech Republic) Hana Šromová	3–6, 4–6
Runner-up	3.	20 June 1998	Istanbul, Turkey	Hard	(Slovakia) Andrea Šebová	(Italy) Giulia Casoni (Germany) Kirstin Freye	3–6, 3–6
Runner-up	4.	17 October 1999	Plzeň, Czech Republic	Clay	(Slovakia) Alena Paulenková	(Czech Republic) Gabriela Chmelinová (Czech Republic) Olga Vymetálková	1–6, 2–6
Runner-up	5.	25 November 1999	Deauville, France	Clay (i)	(Netherlands) Maaike Koutstaal	(France) Chloé Carlotti (France) Virginie Pichet	5–7, 4–6
Winner	5.	29 January 2000	Båstad, Sweden	Hard (i)	(Czech Republic) Helena Vildová	(Sweden) Frida Engblom (Sweden) Erika Ohlsson	6–4, 6–2
Runner-up	6.	23 April 2000	Prostějov, Czech Republic	Clay	(Czech Republic) Helena Vildová	(Czech Republic) Michaela Paštiková (Germany) Jasmin Wöhr	6–3, 1–6, 6–7^{(10–12)}
Winner	6.	22 July 2000	Brussels, Belgium	Clay	(Slovakia) Silvia Uricková	(Argentina) Geraldine Aizenberg (New Zealand) Shelley Stephens	7–6^{(8–6)}, 3–6, 6–1
Runner-up	7.	26 May 2001	Guimarães, Portugal	Hard	(Czech Republic) Lenka Cenková	(Russia) Galina Fokina (Brazil) Vanessa Menga	2–6, 1–6
Winner	7.	16 September 2001	Sofia, Bulgaria	Clay	(Czech Republic) Olga Blahotová	(Ukraine) Olena Schmelzer (Ukraine) Yuliana Fedak	6–3, 6–3
Runner-up	8.	24 March 2002	Juárez, Mexico	Clay	(Czech Republic) Olga Blahotová	(Russia) Maria Kondratieva (Russia) Anastasia Rodionova	3–6, 0–6
Winner	8.	26 October 2002	Opole, Poland	Carpet (i)	(Czech Republic) Eva Martincová	(Czech Republic) Olga Blahotová (Czech Republic) Gabriela Chmelinová	7–5, 7–6^{(7–5)}
Runner-up	9.	2 March 2003	Ostrava, Czech Republic	Hard (i)	(Czech Republic) Galina Voskoboeva	(Italy) Roberta Vinci (Serbia and Montenegro) Dragana Zarić	2–6, 4–6
