= Sofie Albinus =

Danish tennis player

- Country (sports): Denmark
- Born: 21 September 1972 (age 53)
- Plays: Right-handed (double-handed backhand)
- Prize money: $55,432

Singles
- Career record: 106–74
- Career titles: 0 WTA, 7 ITF
- Highest ranking: No. 163 (3 February 1992)

Doubles
- Career record: 78–45
- Career titles: 0 WTA, 9 ITF
- Highest ranking: No. 120 (20 August 1990)

Grand Slam doubles results
- French Open: 2R (1990)
- Wimbledon: 1R (1990)
- US Open: 1R (1990)

Team competitions
- Fed Cup: 13–11

Sofie Albinus (born 21 September 1972) is a former professional Danish tennis player.

Albinus, on 3 February 1992, reached her best singles ranking of world number 163. On 20 August 1990, she peaked at world number 120 in the doubles rankings.

Playing for Denmark at the Fed Cup, Albinus has a win–loss record of 13–11.

== ITF finals ==
=== Singles (7–2) ===
$100,000 tournaments
$75,000 tournaments
$50,000 tournaments
$25,000 tournaments
$10,000 tournaments

Result	No.	Date	Tournament	Surface	Opponent	Score
Loss	1.	26 June 1989	Guadalajara, Mexico	Clay	(Venezuela) María Vento-Kabchi	2–3 ret.
Win	2.	18 February 1991	Lisbon, Portugal	Clay	(Italy) Cristina Salvi	6–4, 7–6^{(5)}
Win	3.	25 February 1991	Lisbon, Portugal	Clay	(France) Agnès Zugasti	6–7^{(2)}, 6–3, 7–5
Win	4.	18 March 1991	Bol, Yugoslavia	Clay	(Socialist Federal Republic of Yugoslavia) Nadin Ercegović	6–2, 6–4
Win	5.	24 June 1991	Ronneby, Sweden	Clay	(Sweden) Annika Narbe	6–2, 6–3
Loss	6.	13 January 1992	Helsinki, Finland	Carpet (i)	(Sweden) Åsa Carlsson	3–6, 3–6
Win	7.	3 February 1992	Hørsholm, Denmark	Carpet	(Germany) Cora Hofmann	6–3, 6–3
Win	8.	7 July 1996	Lohja, Finland	Clay	(Finland) Petra Thorén	6–1, 1–6, 6–1
Win	9.	15 September 1996	Marseille, France	Clay	(Italy) Emanuela Sangiorgi	6–0, 6–2

=== Doubles (9–2) ===
Result	No.	Date	Tournament	Surface	Partner	Opponents	Score
Loss	1.	6 March 1989	Ashkelon, Israel	Hard	(Denmark) Lone Vandborg	(Netherlands) Marianne van der Torre (Netherlands) Caroline Vis	1–6, 1–6
Win	2.	24 July 1989	Haifa, Israel	Hard	(Denmark) Lone Vandborg	(Sweden) Malin Nilsson (Sweden) Eva Lena Olsson	6–1, 6–4
Loss	3.	10 July 1989	Greensboro, United States	Clay	(United States) Shawn Foltz	(United States) Courtney Allen (United States) Renata Baranski	6–2, 3–6, 3–6
Win	4.	13 November 1989	Santiago, Chile	Clay	(France) Noëlle van Lottum	(Brazil) Luciana Della Casa (Italy) Giulia Toschi	6–2, 6–2
Win	5.	13 August 1990	Brasília, Brazil	Clay	(United Kingdom) Samantha Smith	(Brazil) Luciana Tella (Brazil) Andrea Vieira	7–6^{(7–2)}, 4–6, 6–3
Win	6.	11 February 1991	Lisbon, Portugal	Clay	(Denmark) Merete Balling-Stockmann	(Czechoslovakia) Klára Bláhová (Czechoslovakia) Monika Kratochvílová	6–4, 6–4
Win	7.	18 March 1991	Bol, Yugoslavia	Clay	(Denmark) Merete Balling-Stockmann	(Socialist Federal Republic of Yugoslavia) Ivona Horvat (Czechoslovakia) Eva Martincová	6–2, 6–3
Win	8.	9 February 1992	Horsholm, Denmark	Carpet (i)	(Denmark) Tine Scheuer-Larsen	(Belgium) Katrien de Craemer (Belgium) Nancy Feber	6–3, 6–4
Win	9.	31 January 1994	Rungsted, Denmark	Carpet	(Denmark) Henriette Kjær Nielsen	(Sweden) Camilla Persson (Sweden) Anna-Karin Svensson	W\O
Win	10.	4 February 1996	Rungsted, Denmark	Carpet (i)	(Denmark) Maiken Pape	(Sweden) Sofia Finér (Sweden) Annica Lindstedt	3–6, 6–3, 6–4
Win	11.	15 September 1996	Marseille, France	Clay	(Denmark) Karin Ptaszek	(Italy) Alice Canepa (Netherlands) Debby Haak	5–7, 7–5, 6–4
