= Henriette Kjær Nielsen =

Danish tennis player (born 1970)

- Country (sports): Denmark
- Born: 6 January 1970 (age 55)
- Prize money: $8,351

Singles
- Career record: 12–18
- Highest ranking: No. 501 (14 August 1989)

Doubles
- Career record: 38–16
- Career titles: 5 ITF
- Highest ranking: No. 211 (14 August 1989)

Henriette Kjær Nielsen (born 6 January 1970) is a Danish former professional tennis player.

Kjær Nielsen was a member of the Denmark Federation Cup team between 1988 and 1992, featuring in a total of seven ties, all as a doubles player. Most notably, in 1988 she teamed up with Tine Scheuer-Larsen to win the deciding rubber against Argentina's Bettina Fulco and Mercedes Paz, which gave Denmark a berth in the World Group quarter-finals.

== ITF Circuit finals ==
=== Doubles: 6 (5–1) ===
Result	No.	Date	Tournament	Surface	Partner	Opponents	Score
Win	1.	18 September 1988	ITF Caracas, Venezuela	Hard	(Denmark) Anja Michailoff	(Switzerland) Andrea Martinelli (Republic of Ireland) Lesley O'Halloran	6–1, 2–6, 6–1
Loss	1.	25 September 1988	ITF Medellín, Colombia	Clay	(Denmark) Anja Michailoff	(Brazil) Gisele Faria (Brazil) Luciana Tella	6–0, 4–6, 3–6
Win	2.	1 May 1989	ITF Sezze, Italy	Clay	(Switzerland) Natalie Tschan	(Hungary) Virág Csurgó (Hungary) Nóra Köves	6–0, 3–6, 6–3
Win	3.	25 June 1989	ITF Querétaro, Mexico	Hard	(Denmark) Lone Vandborg	(United States) Leslie Hakala (United States) Vincenza Procacci	6–4, 2–6, 7–6
Win	4.	2 July 1989	ITF Guadalajara, Mexico	Clay	(Denmark) Lone Vandborg	(United States) Alysia May (United States) Kimberly Po	6–3, 3–6, 6–2
Win	5.	31 January 1994	ITF Rungsted, Denmark	Carpet (i)	(Denmark) Sofie Albinus	(Sweden) Camilla Persson (Sweden) Anna-Karin Svensson	w/o
