= Dragana Zarić =

Serbian tennis player

Dragana Zarić Martinov Драгана Зарић Мартинов
- Country (sports): Yugoslavia; Serbia and Montenegro; Serbia
- Residence: Vršac, Serbia; Abu Dhabi, UAE
- Born: 1 August 1977 (age 47); Vršac, SR Serbia, SFR Yugoslavia
- Height: 1.70 m (5 ft 7 in)
- Turned pro: 1994
- Retired: 2006
- Plays: Right (two-handed backhand)
- Prize money: $165,828

Singles
- Career record: 233–164
- Career titles: 4 ITF
- Highest ranking: No. 157 (2 April 2001)

Grand Slam singles results
- Australian Open: Q1 (2001, 2002)
- French Open: Q3 (2001)
- Wimbledon: Q1 (2001)
- US Open: Q2 (2001)

Doubles
- Career record: 218–122
- Career titles: 24 ITF
- Highest ranking: No. 82 (10 June 2002)

Grand Slam doubles results
- Australian Open: 3R (2003)
- French Open: 3R (2002)
- Wimbledon: QF (2001)
- US Open: 1R (2001)

Grand Slam mixed doubles results
- Wimbledon: 1R (2002)

Team competitions
- Fed Cup: 33–19

Dragana Zarić Martinov (Serbian Cyrillic: Драгана Зарић Мартинов, born 1 August 1977) is a Serbian former professional tennis player.

Her career-high rankings are No. 157 in singles, achieved in the spring of 2001, and No. 82 in doubles, reached summer 2002. She won four titles in singles and 24 in doubles at tournaments of the ITF Women's Circuit. She also played for the Yugoslavia Fed Cup team, from 1995 until 2005.

Zarić started her professional career in 1994, and in 1995, she won her first ITF title in Nicosia, Cyprus. In 1998, she played her first WTA Tour qualifying draws in Maria Lankowitz and Istanbul, but lost. She kicked off the 2001 season with attempts to qualify on a couple of WTA and all Grand Slam tournaments, but failed to pass the qualifying rounds. In doubles, the same year, she got to the finals of the Budapest Grand Prix and the quarterfinals at the Wimbledon Championships.

Zarić retired from pro tennis 2006.

== WTA Tour finals ==
=== Doubles: 1 (runner-up) ===
Result	Date	Tournament	Tier	Surface	Partner	Opponents	Score
Loss	Apr 2001	Budapest Grand Prix, Hungary	Tier V	Clay	(Hungary) Zsófia Gubacsi	(Slovakia) Janette Husárová (Italy) Tathiana Garbin	1–6, 3–6

== ITF Circuit finals ==
Legend
$100,000 tournaments
$75,000 tournaments
$50,000 tournaments
$25,000 tournaments
$10,000 tournaments

=== Singles: 13 (4–9) ===
Result	No.	Date	Tournament	Surface	Opponent	Score
Loss	1.	20 March 1995	ITF Castellón de la Plana, Spain	Clay	(Japan) Miho Saeki	1–6, 6–1, 6–7^{(2)}
Loss	2.	16 October 1995	ITF Joué-lès-Tours, France	Hard	(France) Emmanuelle Curutchet	6–7^{(6)}, 6–7^{(5)}
Win	3.	30 October 1995	ITF Nicosia, Cyprus	Clay	(Bulgaria) Antoaneta Pandjerova	6–2, 6–3
Loss	4.	12 May 1997	ITF Novi Sad, Serbia	Clay	(Italy) Tathiana Garbin	4–6, 1–6
Loss	5.	1 March 1998	ITF Bushey, United Kingdom	Carpet (i)	(Ukraine) Elena Tatarkova	2–6, 6–4, 0–6
Loss	6.	30 April 2000	ITF Bournemouth, United Kingdom	Clay	(Tunisia) Selima Sfar	5–7, 2–6
Win	7.	7 May 2000	ITF Hatfield, United Kingdom	Clay	(France) Camille Pin	7–6^{(4)}, 6–4
Loss	8.	8 May 2000	ITF Swansea, United Kingdom	Clay	(Australia) Christina Wheeler	4–6, 6–7^{(4)}
Win	9.	22 October 2000	ITF Cardiff, United Kingdom	Carpet (i)	(Belgium) Laurence Courtois	7–5, 5–7, 6–4
Loss	10.	18 February 2001	ITF Sutton, United Kingdom	Hard (i)	(Kazakhstan) Irina Selyutina	3–6, 1–6
Loss	11.	17 February 2002	ITF Sutton, United Kingdom	Hard (i)	(Czech Republic) Zuzana Ondrášková	6–7^{(5)}, 4–6
Loss	12.	10 October 2004	Royal Cup, Montenegro	Clay	(Hungary) Miljana Adanko	3–6, 3–6
Win	13.	16 October 2004	ITF Herceg Novi, Montenegro	Clay	(Slovenia) Maša Zec Peškirič	6–7^{(4)}, 6–4, 7–6^{(5)}

=== Doubles: 40 (24–16) ===
Result	No.	Date	Tournament	Surface	Partner	Opponents	Score
Loss	1.	24 April 1995	ITF Bari, Italy	Clay	(Federal Republic of Yugoslavia) Marina Gojković	(Italy) Alice Canepa (Italy) Giulia Casoni	0–6, 0–6
Loss	2.	20 November 1995	ITF Le Havre, France	Clay (i)	(North Macedonia) Marina Lazarovska	(Czech Republic) Markéta Štusková (Austria) Patricia Wartusch	4–6, 5–7
Win	3.	4 March 1996	ITF Buchen, Germany	Carpet (i)	(North Macedonia) Marina Lazarovska	(Germany) Lisa Fritz (Russia) Katerina Tikhankina	6–4, 4–6, 6–4
Loss	4.	7 April 1996	ITF Athens, Greece	Clay	(Germany) Marlene Weingärtner	(Sweden) Annica Lindstedt (Sweden) Anna-Karin Svensson	0–6, 2–6
Win	5.	5 May 1996	ITF Balaguer, Spain	Clay	(Greece) Ariadne Katsoulis	(Spain) Patricia Aznar (Spain) Yolanda Clemot-Lerendegui	7–5, 6–4
Win	6.	26 January 1997	ITF Bastad, Sweden	Hard (i)	(Sweden) Annica Lindstedt	(Sweden) Anna-Karin Svensson (Belgium) Patty Van Acker	6–7, 7–6, 6–3
Loss	7.	2 February 1997	ITF Rungsted, Denmark	Carpet (i)	(Croatia) Kristina Pojatina	(Finland) Linda Jansson (Sweden) Annica Lindstedt	6–4, 5–7, 4–6
Loss	8.	16 February 1997	ITF Rogaska Slatina, Slovenia	Carpet (i)	(Israel) Hila Rosen	(Austria) Barbara Schwartz (Austria) Patricia Wartusch	1–6, 4–6
Win	9.	20 April 1997	ITF Bari, Italy	Clay	(Federal Republic of Yugoslavia) Sandra Načuk	(Israel) Tzipora Obziler (Israel) Anna Smashnova	6–4, 6–2
Loss	10.	12 May 1997	ITF Novi Sad, Serbia	Clay	(Bulgaria) Teodora Nedeva	(Italy) Tathiana Garbin (San Marino) Francesca Guardigli	4–6, 4–6
Win	11.	25 May 1997	ITF Skopje, Macedonia	Clay	(Bulgaria) Teodora Nedeva	(Italy) Laura Fodorean (Italy) Katia Altilia	6–3, 6–2
Loss	12.	21 September 1997	ITF Sofia, Bulgaria	Clay	(Federal Republic of Yugoslavia) Sandra Načuk	(Germany) Sandra Klösel (Austria) Karin Kschwendt	4–6, 4–6
Win	13.	17 May 1998	ITF Novi Sad, Serbia	Clay	(Federal Republic of Yugoslavia) Tatjana Ječmenica	(Bulgaria) Antoaneta Pandjerova (Bulgaria) Desislava Topalova	6–2, 7–5
Loss	14.	14 September 1998	ITF Otočec, Slovenia	Clay	(Hungary) Nóra Köves	(Slovenia) Katarina Srebotnik (Germany) Jasmin Wöhr	2–6, 3–6
Win	15.	15 February 1999	ITF Redbridge, United Kingdom	Hard (i)	(Hungary) Nóra Köves	(Czech Republic) Lenka Němečková (Austria) Patricia Wartusch	6–1, 6–4
Win	16.	1 March 1999	ITF Biel, Switzerland	Hard (i)	(Hungary) Nóra Köves	(Switzerland) Laura Bao (Switzerland) Marylene Losey	6–2, 6–2
Win	17.	17 October 1999	ITF Welwyn, United Kingdom	Hard (i)	(Slovenia) Maja Matevžič	(Romania) Magda Mihalache (Slovakia) Zuzana Váleková	7–6^{(1)}, 5–7, 6–2
Win	18.	8 May 2000	ITF Swansea, United Kingdom	Clay	(Hungary) Nóra Köves	(Russia) Natalia Egorova (Russia) Ekaterina Sysoeva	2–6, 6–4, 6–3
Loss	19.	25 June 2000	ITF Gorizia, Italy	Clay	(Slovenia) Maja Matevžič	(Brazil) Vanessa Menga (Spain) Alicia Ortuño	6–4, 4–6, 1–6
Win	20.	9 October 2000	ITF Welwyn, United Kingdom	Hard (i)	(New Zealand) Shelley Stephens	(Italy) Antonella Serra Zanetti (Italy) Adriana Serra Zanetti	4–0, 5–3, 4–1
Win	21.	16 September 2001	ITF Bordeaux, France	Clay	(Federal Republic of Yugoslavia) Sandra Načuk	(Spain) Conchita Martínez Granados (Italy) Antonella Serra Zanetti	6–2, 7–6^{(6)}
Loss	22.	4 November 2001	ITF Bolton, United Kingdom	Hard (i)	(Federal Republic of Yugoslavia) Sandra Načuk	(Russia) Maria Goloviznina (Morocco) Bahia Mouhtassine	4–6, 3–6
Win	23.	12 February 2002	ITF Sutton, United Kingdom	Carpet (i)	(Austria) Sylvia Plischke	(Estonia) Maret Ani (Russia) Galina Fokina	7–5, 6–3
Win	24.	13 May 2002	ITF Bromma, Sweden	Clay	(Federal Republic of Yugoslavia) Katarina Mišić	(Brazil) Joana Cortez (United States) Tiffany Dabek	6–4, 6–4
Win	25.	21 May 2002	ITF Turin, Italy	Clay	(Federal Republic of Yugoslavia) Katarina Mišić	(Argentina) Erica Krauth (Hungary) Katalin Marosi	7–6^{(5)}, 6–3
Win	26.	12 August 2002	ITF Aosta, Italy	Clay	(Federal Republic of Yugoslavia) Katarina Mišić	(Brazil) Maria Fernanda Alves (Romania) Andreea Ehritt-Vanc	7–5, 7–6^{(6)}
Win	27.	15 October 2002	ITF Southampton, United Kingdom	Hard (i)	(Netherlands) Amanda Hopmans	(Latvia) Līga Dekmeijere (Republic of Ireland) Yvonne Doyle	6–2, 6–1
Loss	28.	27 October 2002	ITF Saint-Raphaël, France	Hard (i)	(Federal Republic of Yugoslavia) Katarina Mišić	(Bulgaria) Antoaneta Pandjerova (Bulgaria) Desislava Topalova	6–4, 3–6, 1–6
Loss	29.	18 February 2003	ITF Redbridge, United Kingdom	Hard (i)	(Federal Republic of Yugoslavia) Katarina Mišić	(Belarus) Olga Barabanschikova (Belarus) Nadejda Ostrovskaya	4–6, 6–1, 5–7
Win	30.	2 March 2003	ITF Ostrava, Czech Republic	Hard (i)	(Italy) Roberta Vinci	(Kazakhstan) Galina Voskoboeva (Czech Republic) Magdalena Zděnovcová	6–2, 6–4
Loss	31.	23 June 2003	ITF Fontanafredda, Italy	Clay	(Bulgaria) Maria Geznenge	(China) Li Ting (China) Sun Tiantian	4–6, 3–6
Loss	32.	30 June 2003	ITF Stuttgart, Germany	Clay	(Bulgaria) Maria Geznenge	(Germany) Antonia Matic (Germany) Angelika Rösch	1–6, 6–7^{(2)}
Win	33.	21 September 2003	ITF Sofia, Bulgaria	Clay	(Bulgaria) Desislava Topalova	(Austria) Daniela Klemenschits (Austria) Sandra Klemenschits	6–3, 7–5
Win	34.	10 May 2004	ITF Stockholm, Sweden	Clay	(Belarus) Nadejda Ostrovskaya	(Sweden) Sofia Arvidsson (Sweden) Hanna Nooni	7–6^{(3)}, 6–3
Loss	35.	5 July 2004	ITF Darmstadt, Germany	Clay	(Serbia and Montenegro) Katarina Mišić	(Germany) Vanessa Henke (Germany) Martina Müller	1–6, 5–7
Win	36.	10 October 2004	ITF Podgorica, Montenegro	Clay	(Serbia and Montenegro) Katarina Mišić	(Czech Republic) Janette Bejlková (Bulgaria) Biljana Pawlowa-Dimitrova	6–1, 6–2
Win	37.	16 October 2004	ITF Herceg Novi, Montenegro	Clay	(Serbia and Montenegro) Katarina Mišić	(Slovenia) Alja Zec Peškirič (Slovenia) Maša Zec Peškirič	6–1, 6–2
Win	38.	29 November 2004	ITF Cairo, Egypt	Clay	(Serbia and Montenegro) Katarina Mišić	(Russia) Galina Fokina (Russia) Raissa Gourevitch	7–5, 6–4
Win	39.	6 December 2004	ITF Cairo, Egypt	Clay	(Serbia and Montenegro) Katarina Mišić	(Russia) Galina Fokina (Russia) Raissa Gourevitch	6–2, 6–2
Loss	40.	30 January 2005	ITF Sunderland, United Kingdom	Hard (i)	(Serbia and Montenegro) Katarina Mišić	(Sweden) Sofia Arvidsson (Germany) Martina Müller	2–6, 3–6
