= Karin Ptaszek =

Danish tennis player

- Country (sports): Denmark
- Born: 24 December 1971 (age 53)
- Plays: Right-handed
- Prize money: $46,280

Singles
- Career record: 144–102
- Career titles: 0 WTA, 3 ITF
- Highest ranking: No. 265 (31 January 1994)

Doubles
- Career record: 68 - 55
- Career titles: 0 WTA, 6 ITF
- Highest ranking: No. 230 (10 October 1994)

Team competitions
- Fed Cup: 23–16

Karin Ptaszek (born 24 December 1971) is a Danish former professional tennis player.

Playing for Denmark at the Fed Cup, Ptaszek has a win–loss record of 23–16.

== ITF finals ==
=== Singles (3–6) ===
$100,000 tournaments
$75,000 tournaments
$50,000 tournaments
$25,000 tournaments
$10,000 tournaments

Result	No.	Date	Tournament	Surface	Opponent	Score
Loss	1.	26 September 1988	Bogotá, Colombia	Clay	(Brazil) Luciana Tella	4–6, 6–4, 2–6
Loss	2.	1 July 1991	Båstad, Sweden	Clay	(Sweden) Anneli Ornstedt	1–6, 0–6
Loss	3.	5 July 1993	Lohja, Finland	Clay	(Finland) Nanne Dahlman	2–6, 5–7
Win	4.	17 January 1994	Turku, Finland	Clay	(Sweden) Maria-Farnes Capistrano	6–2, 6–2
Loss	5.	30 January 1995	Rungsted, Denmark	Carpet (i)	(Czech Republic) Sandra Kleinová	2–6, 7–6, 1–6
Loss	6.	3 July 1995	Lohja, Finland	Clay	(Finland) Nanne Dahlman	6–7^{(4)}, 1–6
Win	7.	10 July 1995	Olsztyn, Poland	Clay	(Austria) Sandra Mantler	6–1, 6–1
Loss	8.	22 January 1996	Båstad, Sweden	Clay	(Sweden) Anna-Karin Svensson	5–7, 3–6
Win	9.	29 January 1996	Rungsted, Denmark	Carpet (i)	(Germany) Heike Thoms	6–0, 6–4

=== Doubles (6–4) ===
Result	No.	Date	Tournament	Surface	Partner	Opponents	Score
Loss	1.	18 September 1989	Bangkok, Thailand	Hard	(Hong Kong) Paulette Moreno	(United Kingdom) Valda Lake (New Zealand) Claudine Toleafoa	6–7, 6–1, 5–7
Loss	2.	7 July 1991	Båstad, Sweden	Clay	(Hungary) Antonia Homolya	(Netherlands) Sandra van der Aa (Netherlands) Seda Noorlander	3–6, 4–6
Loss	3.	26 October 1992	Madeira, Portugal	Hard	(Sweden) Marianne Vallin	(Belgium) Els Callens (Germany) Julia Jehs	1–6, 3–6
Win	4.	24 January 1994	Båstad, Sweden	Hard	(Czech Republic) Gabriela Netíková	(Germany) Tanja Karsten (Germany) Michaela Seibold	6–3, 5–7, 6–0
Win	5.	27 March 1994	Brest, France	Hard	(Belgium) Els Callens	(Italy) Susanna Attili (Italy) Elena Savoldi	6–4, 6–1
Loss	6.	30 January 1995	Rungsted, Denmark	Carpet (i)	(Denmark) Anja Kostecki	(Finland) Linda Jansson (Sweden) Anna-Karin Svensson	3–6, 1–6
Win	7.	30 October 1995	Stockholm, Sweden	Hard	(Sweden) Anna-Karin Svensson	(Sweden) Sofia Finér (Sweden) Annica Lindstedt	6–1, 6–3
Win	8.	21 January 1996	Turku, Finland	Carpet (i)	(Sweden) Anna-Karin Svensson	(Sweden) Sofia Finér (Sweden) Annica Lindstedt	6–2, 6–4
Win	9.	27 January 1996	Bastad, Sweden	Hard (i)	(Sweden) Anna-Karin Svensson	(Sweden) Sofia Finér (Sweden) Annica Lindstedt	6–3, 6–4
Win	10.	15 September 1996	Marseille, France	Clay	(Denmark) Sofie Albinus	(Italy) Alice Canepa (Netherlands) Debby Haak	5–7, 7–5, 6–4
