= Patty Van Acker =

Belgian tennis player

- Country (sports): Belgium
- Born: 21 October 1976 (age 48); Bruges, Belgium
- Height: 1.65 m (5 ft 5 in)
- Plays: Right-handed (two-handed backhand)
- Prize money: $102,675

Singles
- Career record: 221–177
- Career titles: 8 ITF
- Highest ranking: No. 146 (10 May 1999)

Doubles
- Career record: 92–91
- Career titles: 5 ITF
- Highest ranking: No. 195 (29 July 2002)

Patty Van Acker (born 21 October 1976) is a former tennis player from Belgium.

== Biography ==
A right-handed player from Bruges, Van Acker turned professional at the age of 18.

She made her WTA Tour main-draw singles debut at the 1999 Internazionali di Palermo, as a lucky loser from the qualifiers. At the 2000 Antwerp Open, she featured as a wildcard in the main draw. In her career, she won eight singles titles and five doubles titles ITF Circuit. She reached a highest singles ranking of 146 in the world.

Van Acker now works as a tennis trainer at the Challenger Tennis Academy in Aartrijke.

== ITF Circuit finals ==
=== Singles: 14 (8–6) ===
$50,000 tournaments
$25,000 tournaments
$10,000 tournaments

Result	No.	Date	Tournament	Surface	Opponent	Score
Loss	1.	8 May 1995	ITF Le Touquet, France	Clay	(France) Amélie Cocheteux	2–6, 1–6
Win	1.	24 July 1995	ITF Heerhugowaard, Netherlands	Clay	(Czech Republic) Zuzana Lešenarová	6–4, 6–2
Win	2.	7 August 1995	ITF Rebecq, Belgium	Clay	(Belgium) Caroline Wuillot	6–4, 4–6, 6–1
Win	3.	7 April 1996	ITF Moulins, France	Hard	(France) Isabelle Taesch	6–1, 4–6, 6–4
Loss	2.	12 May 1996	ITF Le Touquet, France	Clay	(Italy) Germana Di Natale	3–6, 6–7
Win	4.	23 June 1996	ITF Klosters, Switzerland	Clay	(Germany) Kerstin Taube	6–2, 6–2
Win	5.	26 January 1997	ITF Båstad, Sweden	Hard	(Sweden) Anna-Karin Svensson	4–6, 7–5, 6–1
Loss	3.	10 May 1998	ITF Quartu Sant'Elena, Italy	Hard	(Germany) Meike Fröhlich	4–6, 6–3, 1–6
Win	6.	31 May 1998	ITF San Severino, Italy	Clay	(Slovenia) Maja Matevžič	7–5, 6–3
Loss	4.	14 June 1998	ITF Lenzerheide, Switzerland	Clay	(Czech Republic) Magdalena Zděnovcová	6–1, 6–7, 4–6
Win	7.	9 August 1998	ITF Paderborn, Germany	Clay	(Sweden) Maria Wolfbrandt	6–0, 6–4
Loss	5.	30 August 1998	ITF Middelkerke, Belgium	Clay	(Argentina) Luciana Masante	7–5, 3–6, 4–6
Win	8.	20 August 2000	ITF London, England	Hard	(South Africa) Mareze Joubert	6–4, 6–1
Loss	6.	24 March 2002	ITF Cholet, France	Clay	(Germany) Sandra Klösel	7–6^{(7–2)}, 4–6, 4–6

=== Doubles: 13 (5–8) ===
Result	No.	Date	Tournament	Surface	Partner	Opponents	Score
Win	1.	12 June 1995	ITF Bossonnens, Switzerland	Clay	(Netherlands) Debby Haak	(Netherlands) Stephanie Gomperts (Netherlands) Henriëtte van Aalderen	6–7, 6–3, 7–5
Loss	1.	11 May 1996	ITF Le Touquet, France	Clay	(Russia) Anna Linkova	(France) Nathalie Herreman (France) Karine Quentrec	1–6, 1–6
Win	2.	23 June 1996	ITF Klosters, Switzerland	Clay	(Netherlands) Debby Haak	(Germany) Silke Frankl (Austria) Ursula Svetlik	6–3, 7–6
Loss	2.	6 October 1996	ITF Lerida, Spain	Clay	(Netherlands) Amanda Hopmans	(Germany) Kirstin Freye (Austria) Barbara Schwartz	2–6, 1–6
Loss	3.	25 January 1997	ITF Bastad, Sweden	Hard (i)	(Sweden) Anna-Karin Svensson	(Sweden) Annica Lindstedt (Federal Republic of Yugoslavia) Dragana Zarić	7–6, 6–7, 3–6
Win	3.	19 July 1997	ITF Getxo, Spain	Clay	(Netherlands) Amanda Hopmans	(Spain) Alicia Ortuño (Israel) Hila Rosen	7–5, 4–6, 7–5
Loss	4.	9 April 2000	ITF Dinan, France	Clay (i)	(France) Stéphanie Foretz	(Germany) Vanessa Henke (Germany) Syna Schmidle	7–6^{(7–2)}, 4–6, 2–6
Loss	5.	17 February 2001	ITF Sutton, England	Hard (i)	(Netherlands) Amanda Hopmans	(Greece) Eleni Daniilidou (Germany) Lydia Steinbach	0–6, 4–6
Win	4.	23 September 2001	ITF Glasgow, Scotland	Hard (i)	(Belgium) Leslie Butkiewicz	(Sweden) Helena Ejeson (Czech Republic) Eva Erbová	6–2, 6–2
Loss	6.	23 March 2002	ITF Cholet, France	Clay	(Belgium) Leslie Butkiewicz	(Belgium) Caroline Maes (Czech Republic) Gabriela Navrátilová	1–4 ret.
Loss	7.	13 April 2002	ITF Dinan, France	Clay (i)	(Ukraine) Yuliya Beygelzimer	(France) Caroline Dhenin (France) Émilie Loit	3–6, 1–6
Loss	8.	22 June 2002	ITF Lenzerheide, Switzerland	Clay	(Belgium) Leslie Butkiewicz	(Australia) Nicole Sewell (Australia) Samantha Stosur	4–6, 3–6
Win	5.	30 June 2002	ITF Fontanafredda, Italy	Clay	(Belgium) Leslie Butkiewicz	(Netherlands) Susanne Trik (Australia) Kristen van Elden	7–5, 6–3
