= Maria Wolfbrandt =

Swedish tennis player

- Country (sports): Sweden
- Born: 18 March 1979 (age 46)
- Turned pro: 1994
- Retired: 2007
- Plays: Right-handed (two-handed backhand)
- Prize money: $83,969

Singles
- Career record: 249–174
- Career titles: 10 ITF
- Highest ranking: No. 219 (3 February 2003)

Doubles
- Career record: 117–93
- Career titles: 11 ITF
- Highest ranking: No. 180 (25 August 2003)

Maria Wolfbrandt (born 18 March 1979) is a former professional tennis player from Sweden.

She won ten singles and eleven doubles titles on the ITF Circuit. On 3 February 2003, she achieved her best singles ranking of world No. 219. On 25 August 2003, she peaked at No. 180 in the doubles rankings.

Playing for Sweden in Fed Cup, Wolfbrandt has a win–loss record of 5–3.

She retired from professional tennis 2007.

== ITF Circuit finals ==
$50,000 tournaments
$25,000 tournaments
$10,000 tournaments

=== Singles: 17 (10–7) ===
| Result | Date | Tournament | Surface | Opponent | Score |
|---|---|---|---|---|---|
| Win | 15 January 1996 | ITF Turku, Finland | Hard (i) | (Sweden) Sofia Finér | 4–6, 6–2, 6–1 |
| Loss | 19 January 1998 | ITF Båstad, Sweden | Hard (i) | (Russia) Maria Goloviznina | 3–6, 5–7 |
| Win | 29 June 1998 | ITF Lohja, Finland | Clay | (Sweden) Maria Persson | 6–3, 7–5 |
| Loss | 3 August 1998 | ITF Paderborn, Germany | Clay | (Belgium) Patty Van Acker | 0–6, 4–6 |
| Win | 21 June 1999 | ITF Båstad, Sweden | Clay | (Sweden) Diana Majkic | 6–3, 6–1 |
| Win | 5 June 2000 | ITF Antalya, Turkey | Clay | (Switzerland) Aliénor Tricerri | 6–2, 6–0 |
| Win | 26 June 2000 | ITF Båstad, Sweden | Clay | (Denmark) Charlotte Aagaard | 6–2, 6–0 |
| Loss | 14 August 2000 | ITF Koksijde, Belgium | Clay | (Netherlands) Anousjka van Exel | 3–6, 4–6 |
| Win | 11 September 2000 | ITF Madrid, Spain | Clay | (Spain) Carolina Rodriguez | 6–1, 6–1 |
| Win | 25 September 2000 | ITF Lerida, Spain | Clay | (France) Séverine Beltrame | 6–3, 6–4 |
| Win | 16 October 2000 | ITF Chieti, Italy | Clay | (Switzerland) Laura Bao | 3–5, 5–4, 2–4, 5–4, 5–3 |
| Loss | 4 March 2002 | ITF Makarska, Croatia | Clay | (Slovenia) Tina Hergold | 6–3, 3–6, 5–7 |
| Win | 29 April 2002 | ITF Warsaw, Poland | Clay | (Czech Republic) Iveta Gerlová | 6–2, 6–4 |
| Win | 28 May 2002 | ITF Warsaw, Poland | Clay | (Czech Republic) Iveta Gerlová | 6–3, 4–6, 6–4 |
| Loss | 30 June 2002 | ITF Båstad, Sweden | Clay | (Sweden) Sofia Arvidsson | 5–7, 4–6 |
| Loss | 3 May 2004 | ITF Mérida, Mexico | Hard | (Argentina) Andrea Benítez | 4–6, 3–6 |
| Loss | 21 June 2004 | ITF Périgueux, France | Clay | (Brazil) Maria Fernanda Alves | 3–6, 3–6 |

=== Doubles: 20 (11–9) ===
| Result | Date | Tournament | Surface | Partner | Opponents | Score |
|---|---|---|---|---|---|---|
| Loss | 3 July 1995 | ITF Lohja, Finland | Clay | (Sweden) Maria-Farnes Capistrano | (Sweden) Sofia Finér (Sweden) Annica Lindstedt | 5–7, 4–6 |
| Win | 21 June 1999 | ITF Båstad, Sweden | Clay | (Finland) Minna Rautajoki | (Finland) Hanna-Katri Aalto (Finland) Kirsi Lampinen | 1–6, 6–2, 6–4 |
| Loss | 21 June 1999 | ITF Tallinn, Estonia | Clay | (Finland) Minna Rautajoki | (Russia) Irina Kornienko (Russia) Ekaterina Sysoeva | 1–6, 1–6 |
| Win | 23 August 1999 | ITF Hechingen, Germany | Clay | (Germany) Jennifer Tinnacher | (Germany) Gréta Arn (Hungary) Eszter Molnár | 6–4, 6–3 |
| Win | 4 October 1999 | ITF Girona, Spain | Clay | (Italy) Mara Santangelo | (Spain) Marina Escobar (Spain) Rocio Gonzalez | 6–7^{(3–7)}, 6–1, 6–3 |
| Loss | 31 January 2000 | ITF Mallorca, Spain | Clay | (France) Aurélie Védy | (Austria) Stefanie Haidner (Netherlands) Debby Haak | 4–6, 6–3, 4–6 |
| Win | 5 June 2000 | ITF Antalya, Turkey | Clay | (Austria) Susanne Filipp | (Belarus) Elena Yaryshka (Poland) Agata Kurowska | 6–2, 6–4 |
| Win | 5 June 2000 | ITF Tallinn, Estonia | Clay | (Poland) Agata Kurowska | (Estonia) Kaia Kanepi (Germany) Scarlett Werner | 7–6 ^{(7–5)}, 6–4 |
| Loss | 26 June 2000 | ITF Båstad, Sweden | Clay | (Austria) Susanne Filipp | (Sweden) Sofia Arvidsson (Germany) Kristina Jarkenstedt | 4–6, 5–7 |
| Win | 30 October 2000 | ITF Stockholm, Sweden | Hard (i) | (Sweden) Jenny Lindström | (Sweden) Sofia Arvidsson (Germany) Kristina Jarkenstedt | 4–0, 5–3, 4–0 |
| Win | 28 January 2002 | ITF Mallorca, Spain | Clay | (Austria) Jennifer Schmidt | (Denmark) Karina Jacobsgaard (Russia) Irena Nossenko | 7–6^{(7–3)}, 7–5 |
| Loss | 4 February 2002 | ITF Mallorca, Spain | Clay | (Austria) Jennifer Schmidt | (Spain) Rosa María Andrés Rodríguez (Spain) Mariam Ramon Climent | 2–6, 3–6 |
| Loss | 18 February 2002 | ITF Las Palmas, Spain | Clay | (Austria) Jennifer Schmidt | (Spain) Rosa María Andrés Rodríguez (Russia) Dinara Safina | 1–6, 2–6 |
| Win | 28 May 2002 | ITF Warsaw, Poland | Clay | (Sweden) Jenny Lindström | (Russia) Maria Boboedova (Australia) Lauren Breadmore | 6–3, 6–2 |
| Winner | 27 October 2002 | ITF Cairo, Egypt | Clay | (Hungary) Kira Nagy | (India) Rushmi Chakravarthi (India) Sai Jayalakshmy Jayaram | 6–2, 6–1 |
| Win | 21 July 2003 | ITF Innsbruck, Austria | Clay | (Hungary) Kira Nagy | (Hungary) Melinda Czink (Italy) Mara Santangelo | 6–4, 4–6, 6–4 |
| Loss | 23 February 2004 | ITF Las Palmas, Spain | Clay | (Hungary) Eszter Molnár | (Argentina) María José Argeri (Brazil) Letícia Sobral | 3–6, 3–6 |
| Win | 17 May 2004 | ITF Gdynia, Poland | Clay | (Germany) Stefanie Weis | (Ukraine) Natalia Bogdanova (Ukraine) Valeria Bondarenko | 3–6, 6–3, 7–5 |
| Loss | 7 June 2004 | ITF Vaduz, Liechtenstein | Clay | (Hungary) Kira Nagy | (Belarus) Tatiana Poutchek (Australia) Anastasia Rodionova | 3–6, 4–6 |
| Loss | 12 July 2004 | ITF Vittel, France | Clay | (Russia) Maria Goloviznina | (France) Séverine Beltrame (France) Stéphanie Cohen-Aloro | 1–6, 3–6 |
