= Anna-Karin Svensson =

Swedish tennis player (born 1974)

- Full name: Anna-Karin Svensson
- Country (sports): Sweden
- Born: 8 May 1974 (age 52)
- Retired: 1998
- Prize money: $23,814

Singles
- Career record: 61–51
- Career titles: 1 ITF
- Highest ranking: No. 280 (17 March 1997)

Doubles
- Career record: 97–36
- Career titles: 14 ITF
- Highest ranking: No. 160 (28 October 1996)

Team competitions
- Fed Cup: 6–4

Anna-Karin Svensson (born 8 May 1974) is a former professional tennis player from Sweden.

== Biography ==
Svensson played on the professional tour in the 1990s, with a best ranking in singles of 280 in the world. As a doubles player, she had a breakthrough year in 1996 when she won seven ITF titles, to reach a career-high ranking of 160.

Across 1996 and 1997 she featured in eight Fed Cup ties for Sweden. In Fed Cup play, she had a 4–4 record in singles and won both of her two doubles matches.

== ITF finals ==
Legend
$25,000 tournaments
$10,000 tournaments

=== Singles (1–3) ===
Result	No.	Date	Tournament	Surface	Opponent	Score
Loss	1.	2 April 1995	Nairobi, Kenya	Hard	(North Macedonia) Ivona Mihailova	4–6, 2–6
Loss	2.	30 October 1995	Stockholm, Sweden	Hard (i)	(Sweden) Åsa Svensson	1–6, 2–6
Win	3.	22 January 1996	Båstad, Sweden	Clay	(Denmark) Karin Ptaszek	7–5, 6–3
Loss	4.	26 January 1997	Båstad, Sweden	Hard	(Belgium) Patty Van Acker	6–4, 5–7, 1–6

=== Doubles (14–10) ===
Result	No.	Date	Tournament	Surface	Partner	Opponents	Score
Loss	1.	7 February 1993	Rungsted, Denmark	Carpet	(Sweden) Camilla Persson	(Luxembourg) Christine Goy (Belgium) Vanessa Matthys	2–6, 2–6
Loss	2.	5 September 1993	Burgas, Bulgaria	Hard	(Sweden) Camilla Persson	(Bulgaria) Svetlana Krivencheva (Ukraine) Elena Tatarkova	7–5, 2–6, 3–6
Loss	3.	6 February 1994	Rungsted, Denmark	Carpet	(Sweden) Camilla Persson	(Denmark) Sofie Albinus (Denmark) Henriette Kjær Nielsen	w/o
Win	4.	10 July 1994	Lohja, Finland	Clay	(Sweden) Camilla Persson	(Finland) Linda Jansson (Finland) Katrina Saarinen	6–4, 6–3
Loss	5.	29 August 1994	London, England	Grass	(Finland) Linda Jansson	(Germany) Sabine Gerke (United States) Kristine Kurth	4–6, 4–6
Loss	6.	31 October 1994	Jūrmala, Latvia	Hard (i)	(Finland) Linda Jansson	(Belarus) Natalia Noreiko (Belarus) Marina Stets	1–6, 5–7
Loss	7.	16 January 1995	Turku, Finland	Hard	(Finland) Linda Jansson	(Finland) Nanne Dahlman (Finland) Petra Thorén	3–6, 4–6
Loss	8.	23 January 1995	Båstad, Sweden	Hard	(Finland) Linda Jansson	(Czech Republic) Sandra Kleinová (Czech Republic) Jana Lubasová	4–6, 6–7
Win	9.	30 January 1995	Rungsted, Denmark	Carpet (i)	(Finland) Linda Jansson	(Denmark) Anja Kostecki (Denmark) Karin Ptaszek	6–3, 6–1
Loss	10.	25 September 1995	Telford, United Kingdom	Hard (i)	(United Kingdom) Kaye Hand	(United Kingdom) Samantha Smith (United Kingdom) Jane Wood	6–4, 6–7^{(8–6)}, 3–6
Win	11.	30 October 1995	Stockholm, Sweden	Hard	(Denmark) Karin Ptaszek	(Sweden) Sofia Finér (Sweden) Annica Lindstedt	6–1, 6–3
Win	12.	21 January 1996	Turku, Finland	Carpet (i)	(Denmark) Karin Ptaszek	(Sweden) Sofia Finér (Sweden) Annica Lindstedt	6–2, 6–4
Win	13.	27 January 1996	Båstad, Sweden	Hard (i)	(Denmark) Karin Ptaszek	(Sweden) Sofia Finér (Sweden) Annica Lindstedt	6–3, 6–4
Winner	14.	31 March 1996	Caen, France	Clay (i)	(Sweden) Annica Lindstedt	(United Kingdom) Claire Taylor (United Kingdom) Amanda Wainwright	6–4, 7–6
Winner	15.	7 April 1996	Athens, Greece	Clay	(Sweden) Annica Lindstedt	(Federal Republic of Yugoslavia) Dragana Zarić (Germany) Marlene Weingärtner	6–0, 6–2
Winner	16.	30 June 1996	Båstad, Sweden	Clay	(Sweden) Annica Lindstedt	(Germany) Tanja Karsten (Czech Republic) Karin Baleková	6–2, 6–4
Win	17.	19 August 1996	Kyiv, Ukraine	Clay	(Hungary) Réka Vidáts	(Ukraine) Natalia Medvedeva (Ukraine) Anna Zaporozhanova	7–5, 6–3
Winner	18.	20 October 1996	Flensburg, Germany	Carpet (i)	(Sweden) Annica Lindstedt	(Czech Republic) Květa Peschke (Poland) Magdalena Feistel	6–4, 6–2
Loss	19.	25 January 1997	Båstad, Sweden	Hard (i)	(Belgium) Patty Van Acker	(Sweden) Annica Lindstedt (Federal Republic of Yugoslavia) Dragana Zarić	7–6, 6–7, 3–6
Loss	20.	30 March 1997	Dinard, France	Clay	(France) Magalie Lamarre	(Italy) Germana di Natale (Italy) Federica Fortuni	4–6, 5–7
Winner	21.	29 June 1997	Båstad, Sweden	Clay	(Sweden) Annica Lindstedt	(Sweden) Sofia Finér (Finland) Linda Jansson	w/o
Winner	22.	21 July 1997	Valladolid, Spain	Hard	(Sweden) Sofia Finér	(Slovenia) Petra Rampre (Belgium) Daphne van de Zande	6–4, 6–3
Winner	23.	2 November 1997	Stockholm, Sweden	Carpet (i)	(Sweden) Annica Lindstedt	(Czech Republic) Olga Vymetálková (Czech Republic) Jana Macurová	3–6, 7–5, 6–3
Winner	24.	22 June 1998	Båstad, Sweden	Clay	(Sweden) Jenny Lindstrom	(Czech Republic) Gabriela Chmelinová (Czech Republic) Helena Fremuthová	7–6^{(7–1)}, 6–3

== See also ==
- List of Sweden Fed Cup team representatives
