= Zuzana Lešenarová =

Czech tennis player

- Country (sports): Czech Republic
- Born: 1 August 1977 (age 47); Nový Jičín, Czechoslovakia
- Retired: 2003
- Prize money: $45,425

Singles
- Career record: 131–92
- Career titles: 3 ITF
- Highest ranking: 290 (18 June 2001)

Grand Slam singles results
- US Open: 1R (1999)

Doubles
- Career record: 63–51
- Career titles: 2 ITF
- Highest ranking: 268 (25 February 2002)
Medal record
Women's tennis
Representing Czech Republic
Summer Universiade
Bronze medal – third place	1999 Mallorca	Women's Singles
- Last updated on: 06 January 2021.

Zuzana Lešenarová (born 1 August 1977 Nový Jičín) is a Czech former tennis player.

Lešenarová has won 3 singles and 2 doubles titles on the ITF tour during her career. On 18 June 2001, she reached her best singles ranking of world number 290. On 25 February 2002, she peaked at world number 268 in the doubles rankings.

In 1999, she played for the Czech Republic at the 1999 Universiade in Mallorca (Spain) where she won the bronze medal in Women's Singles.

Lešenarová made her WTA main draw debut at the 1999 US Open, receiving a wildcard in the women's singles draw. She lost in the first round to Sandra Klösel.

== Biography ==
Began playing tennis at age 5 with her parents. Coached by her father, Miroslav. Father, Miroslav, is a technician and coaches Zuzana; mother, Helena, is a teacher; has an older sister, Hana, who is a journalist. Graduated from high school in May 1995. Enjoys skiing and playing the violin. Most memorable experience was winning a downhill skiing competition in 1988. Favorite city to visit is Paris. Self-described as an extrovert. Immediate goal is to finish college at the University of San Diego and receive her bachelor's degree.

== ITF Circuit finals ==
=== Singles: 8 (3 titles, 5 runner–ups) ===
Legend $100,000 tournaments $80,000 tournaments $60,000 tournaments $25,000 tournaments $10,000 tournaments	Finals by surface Hard (1–0) Clay (2–5) Grass (0–0) Carpet (0–0)

Result	W–L	Date	Tournament	Tier	Surface	Opponent	Score
Win	1–0	Oct 1993	ITF Makarska, Croatia	10,000	Clay	(Czech Republic) Veronika Šafářová	7–5, 7–5
Loss	1–1	Jul 1995	ITF Toruń, Poland	10,000	Clay	(Czech Republic) Jana Macurová	2–6, 4–6
Loss	1–2	Jul 1995	ITF Heerhugowaard, Netherlands	10,000	Clay	(Belgium) Patty Van Acker	4–6, 2–6
Loss	1–3	Mar 1996	ITF Makarska, Croatia	10,000	Clay	(Croatia) Silvija Talaja	7–5, 4–6, 2–6
Loss	1–4	Sep 1996	ITF Warsaw, Poland	10,000	Clay	(Poland) Anna Bieleń-Żarska	1–6, 3–6
Win	2–4	Oct 1996	ITF Joué-lès-Tours, France	10,000	Hard	(France) Axelle Thomas	6–3, 4–6, 6–2
Win	3–4	Nov 1996	ITF Mallorca, Spain	10,000	Clay	(Spain) Rosa María Andrés Rodríguez	6–4, 6–0
Loss	3–5	Jun 1999	ITF Velp, Netherlands	10,000	Clay	(Hungary) Eszter Molnár	6–7^{(3)}, 3–6

=== Doubles: 7 (2 titles, 5 runner–ups) ===
Result	W–L	Date	Tournament	Tier	Surface	Partner	Opponents	Score
Loss	0–1	Sep 1994	ITF Poreč, Croatia	10,000	Clay	(Czech Republic) Karolina Petříková	(Argentina) Veronica Stele (Argentina) Cintia Tortorella	3–6, 2–6
Loss	0–2	Oct 1996	ITF Joué-lès-Tours, France	10,000	Hard	(Federal Republic of Yugoslavia) Katarina Markovski	(France) Elsa Morel (France) Edith Nunes	6–1, 3–6, 5–7
Win	1–2	Nov 1996	ITF Mallorca, Spain	10,000	Clay	(Czech Republic) Lucie Steflová	(Spain) Eva Bes (Spain) Marina Escobar	3–6, 6–2, 6–3
Loss	1–3	Jul 1997	ITF Amersfoort, Netherlands	10,000	Clay	(Australia) Anna Klim	(Spain) Eva Bes (Netherlands) Debby Haak	3–4 ret.
Win	2–3	Jun 1998	ITF Stare Splavy, Czech Republic	10,000	Clay	(Czech Republic) Lucie Steflová	(Czech Republic) Milena Nekvapilová (Czech Republic) Hana Šromová	6–3, 5–7, 6–2
NP	—	Jul 2000	ITF Amersfoort, Netherlands	10,000	Clay	(Romania) Diana Gherghi	(Netherlands) Marielle Hoogland (Netherlands) Anousjka van Exel	NP
Loss	2–4	Apr 2001	ITF Allentown, United States	25,000	Hard (i)	(United States) Amanda Augustus	(Australia) Lisa McShea (Kazakhstan) Irina Selyutina	5–7, 3–6
Loss	2–5	Apr 2001	ITF Jackson, United States	25,000	Clay	(Austria) Nicole Melch	(United States) Amanda Augustus (Kazakhstan) Irina Selyutina	3–6, 3–6
