= Sofia Finér =

Swedish tennis player (born 1976)

Sofia Tillström
- Full name: Sofia Tillström (Finér)
- Country (sports): Sweden
- Born: 15 May 1976 (age 49)
- Prize money: $19,644

Singles
- Highest ranking: No. 289 (23 June 1997)

Doubles
- Highest ranking: No. 254 (27 October 1997)

Sofia Tillström (born 15 May 1976) is a former professional tennis player from Sweden. She competed during her career as Sofia Finér.

== Career ==
Finér played on the professional tour in the 1990s, reaching a best singles ranking of 289 in the world, with two ITF titles. As a doubles player she had a top ranking of 254 and won three doubles titles on the ITF circuit.

In 1997 she featured as a doubles player in three Fed Cup ties. Partnering Annica Lindstedt, the pair won two of their three matches together for Sweden.

Now known as Sofia Tillström, she is the COO of Good to Great Tennis Academy in Stockholm. Her ex-husband is former ATP Tour player Mikael Tillström.

== ITF finals ==
=== Singles (2–3) ===
Legend
$25,000 tournaments
$10,000 / $15,000 tournaments

Result	No.	Date	Tournament	Surface	Opponent	Score
Loss	1.	16 January 1995	Turku, Finland	Hard (i)	(Czech Republic) Sandra Kleinová	4–6, 6–7
Loss	2.	21 January 1996	Turku, Finland	Hard (i)	(Sweden) Maria Wolfbrandt	6–4, 2–6, 1–6
Loss	3.	24 June 1996	Bastad, Sweden	Clay	(Czech Republic) Gabriela Chmelinová	3–6, 3–6
Win	4.	6 October 1996	Nottingham, United Kingdom	Hard (i)	(United Kingdom) Lorna Woodroffe	6–3, 6–2
Win	5.	9 June 1997	Camucia, Italy	Hard	(Italy) Federica Fortuni	6–3, 6–1

=== Doubles (3–6) ===
Result	No.	Date	Tournament	Surface	Partner	Opponents	Score
Win	1.	3 July 1995	Lohja, Finland	Clay	(Sweden) Annica Lindstedt	(Sweden) Maria-Farnes Capistrano (Sweden) Maria Wolfbrandt	7–5, 6–4
Win	2.	2 October 1995	Nottingham, United Kingdom	Hard	(Sweden) Annica Lindstedt	(United Kingdom) Samantha Smith (United Kingdom) Jane Wood	7–6^{(9–7)}, 7–5
Loss	3.	30 October 1995	Stockholm, Sweden	Hard	(Sweden) Annica Lindstedt	(Denmark) Karin Ptaszek (Sweden) Anna-Karin Svensson	1–6, 3–6
Loss	4.	21 January 1996	Turku, Finland	Carpet (i)	(Sweden) Annica Lindstedt	(Denmark) Karin Ptaszek (Sweden) Anna-Karin Svensson	2–6, 4–6
Loss	5.	27 January 1996	Bastad, Sweden	Hard (i)	(Sweden) Annica Lindstedt	(Denmark) Karin Ptaszek (Sweden) Anna-Karin Svensson	3–6, 4–6
Loss	6.	4 February 1996	Rungsted, Denmark	Carpet (i)	(Sweden) Annica Lindstedt	(Denmark) Sofie Albinus (Denmark) Maiken Pape	6–3, 3–6, 4–6
Loss	7.	29 June 1997	Bastad, Sweden	Clay	(Finland) Linda Jansson	(Sweden) Annica Lindstedt (Sweden) Anna-Karin Svensson	W/O
Loss	8.	7 July 1997	Fiumicino, Italy	Clay	(Russia) Anna Linkova	(Czech Republic) Zuzana Hejdová (Czech Republic) Jana Macurová	1–6, 1–6
Win	9.	21 July 1997	Valladolid, Spain	Hard	(Sweden) Anna-Karin Svensson	(Slovenia) Petra Rampre (Belgium) Daphne van de Zande	6–4, 6–3

== See also ==
- List of Sweden Fed Cup team representatives
