= Anna Klim =

Australian tennis player

- Country (sports): Australia
- Born: 6 December 1975 (age 49)
- Prize money: $15,698

Singles
- Highest ranking: No. 447 (13 Apr 1998)

Grand Slam singles results
- Australian Open: Q1 (1996)

Doubles
- Career record: 1 ITF
- Highest ranking: No. 316 (23 Jun 1997)

Anna Klim (born 6 December 1975), now Anna Eagle, is an Australian former professional tennis player.

Klim is a native of Poland and emigrated to Australia with her family as a child. Her younger brother is two-time Olympic gold medal winning swimmer Michael Klim. She was a student at Wesley College, Melbourne.

Active on the professional tour in the 1990s, Klim made a career high singles ranking of 447. She qualified for a WTA Tour main draw in 1995 at the Surabaya Women's Open and featured in qualifying for the 1996 Australian Open.

== ITF finals ==
=== Doubles: 3 (1–2) ===
Outcome	No.	Date	Tournament	Surface	Partner	Opponents	Score
Runner-up	1.	Jul 1996	ITF Heerhugowaard, Netherlands	Clay	(Germany) Sabine Gerke	(Netherlands) Mariëlle Bruens (Netherlands) Debby Haak	6–1, 0–6, 2–6
Winner	1.	Sep 1996	ITF Warsaw, Poland	Clay	(Australia) Sally-Ann Cuttler	(Czech Republic) Pavlina Bartunková (Poland) Anna Bieleń-Żarska	6–2, 2–6, 6–4
Runner-up	2.	Jul 1997	ITF Amersfoort, Netherlands	Clay	(Czech Republic) Zuzana Lešenarová	(Spain) Eva Bes (Netherlands) Debby Haak	3–4 ret.
