= Eszter Molnár =

Hungarian tennis player

- Country (sports): Hungary
- Born: 27 November 1978 (age 46); Hungary
- Retired: 2005
- Prize money: $62,204

Singles
- Career record: 177–134
- Career titles: 7 ITF
- Highest ranking: No. 252 (11 June 2001)

Doubles
- Career record: 81–71
- Career titles: 4 ITF
- Highest ranking: No. 192 (18 February 2002)

Eszter Molnár (born 27 November 1978) is a Hungarian former professional tennis player. In her career, she won a total of 11 ITF titles and reached a doubles ranking high of world No. 192 on 18 February 2002.

== ITF Circuit finals ==
=== Singles: 12 (7 titles, 5 runner-ups) ===
Legend $100,000 tournaments $75,000 tournaments $50,000 tournaments $25,000 tournaments $10,000 tournaments	Finals by surface Hard (2–0) Clay (5–5) Grass (0–0) Carpet (0–0)

Result	No.	Date	Tier	Tournament	Surface	Opponent	Score
Loss	1.	21 September 1998	10,000	ITF Šibenik, Croatia	Clay	(Slovenia) Katarina Srebotnik	1–6, 2–6
Win	1.	12 October 1998	10,000	ITF Nicosia, Cyprus	Clay	(Denmark) Charlotte Aagaard	6–1, 6–4
Win	2.	24 May 1999	10,000	ITF Kędzierzyn-Koźle, Poland	Clay	(Russia) Daria Panova	6–3, 7–6^{(7–4)}
Win	3.	21 June 1999	10,000	ITF Velp, Netherlands	Clay	(Czech Republic) Zuzana Lešenarová	7–6^{(7–3)}, 6–3
Loss	2.	19 July 1999	10,000	ITF Brussels, Belgium	Clay	(Czech Republic) Gabriela Chmelinová	5–7, 0–6
Win	4.	16 August 1999	10,000	ITF Valašské Meziříčí, Czech Republic	Clay	(Czech Republic) Karolina Petrikova	6–3, 6–4
Loss	3.	23 August 1999	10,000	ITF Hechingen, Germany	Clay	(Germany) Sabine Klaschka	6–7^{(4–7)}, 2–6
Win	5.	5 February 2001	10,000	ITF Mallorca, Spain	Clay	(Slovakia) Katarína Bašternáková	6–3, 6–4
Loss	4.	21 May 2001	25,000	ITF Sofia, Bulgaria	Clay	(Czech Republic) Lenka Dlhopolcová	3–6, 1–6
Win	6.	21 January 2002	10,000	ITF Båstad, Sweden	Hard (i)	(Denmark) Karina Jacobsgaard	6–7^{(5–7)}, 6–4, 6–0
Loss	5.	10 February 2002	10,000	ITF Lecce, Italy	Clay (i)	(Ukraine) Yuliya Beygelzimer	2–6, 1–6
Win	7.	18 February 2002	10,000	ITF Istanbul, Turkey	Hard (i)	(Austria) Daniela Kix	6–2, 6–1

=== Doubles: 13 (4 titles, 9 runner-ups) ===
Legend $100,000 tournaments $75,000 tournaments $50,000 tournaments $25,000 tournaments $10,000 tournaments	Finals by surface Hard (1–2) Clay (2–6) Grass (0–0) Carpet (1–1)

Result	No.	Date	Tier	Tournament	Surface	Partner	Opponents	Score
Runner-up	1.	23 August 1999	10,000	ITF Hechingen, Germany	Clay	(Germany) Gréta Arn	(Germany) Jennifer Tinnacher (Sweden) Maria Wolfbrandt	4–6, 3–6
Runner-up	2.	31 July 2000	25,000	Saint-Gaudens, France	Clay	(Croatia) Maja Palaveršić	(Bulgaria) Svetlana Krivencheva (Ukraine) Elena Tatarkova	6–3, 5–7, 3–6
Runner-up	3.	18 September 2000	10,000	Makarska, Croatia	Clay	(Romania) Oana Elena Golimbioschi	(Netherlands) Anouk Sterk (Netherlands) Anouk Sinnige	4–6, 6–7^{(2)}
Runner-up	4.	5 March 2001	10,000	Buchen, Germany	Carpet (i)	(Hungary) Adrienn Hegedűs	(Austria) Daniela Klemenschits (Austria) Sandra Klemenschits	6–7^{(5–7)}, 6–7^{(8–10)}
Runner-up	5.	16 July 2001	25,000	Valladolid, Spain	Hard	(Hungary) Adrienn Hegedűs	(Germany) Nina Dübbers (Italy) Francesca Lubiani	2–6, 6–7^{(4–7)}
Winner	1.	12 November 2001	10,000	Stupava, Slovakia	Carpet (i)	(Russia) Galina Fokina	(Czech Republic) Petra Cetkovská (Czech Republic) Libuše Průšová	6–3, 6–4
Winner	2.	21 January 2002	10,000	Båstad, Sweden	Hard (i)	(Sweden) Aleksandra Srndovic	(Romania) Liana Ungur (Greece) Christina Zachariadou	2–6, 6–2, 7–5
Winner	3.	10 February 2002	10,000	Lecce, Italy	Clay (i)	(Ukraine) Yuliya Beygelzimer	(Czech Republic) Eva Erbova (Slovenia) Tina Hergold	7–6^{(9–7)}, 6–4
Runner-up	6.	24 February 2002	10,000	Istanbul, Turkey	Hard (i)	(Turkey) İpek Şenoğlu	(Russia) Goulnara Fattakhetdinova (Italy) Giorgia Mortello	5–7, 1–6
Winner	4.	19 August 2002	25,000	Maribor, Slovenia	Clay	(Slovenia) Tina Hergold	(Ukraine) Alona Bondarenko (Russia) Olga Kalyuzhnaya	6–1, 6–1
Runner-up	7.	30 September 2002	10,000	Ciampino, Italy	Clay	(Romania) Oana Elena Golimbioschi	(Italy) Alice Canepa (Italy) Emily Stellato	1–6, 6–4, 2–6
Runner-up	8.	31 March 2003	10,000	Napoli, Italy	Clay	(Romania) Oana Elena Golimbioschi	(Austria) Stefanie Haidner (Brazil) Vanessa Menga	6–7^{(6–8)}, 3–6
Runner-up	9.	23 February 2004	10,000	Las Palmas, Spain	Clay	(Sweden) Maria Wolfbrandt	(Argentina) María José Argeri (Brazil) Letícia Sobral	3–6, 3–6
