= Maiken Pape =

Danish footballer & tennis player (born 1978)

Personal information
- Full name: Maiken With Pape
- Date of birth: 20 February 1978 (age 48)
- Position: Striker

Senior career*
Years	Team	Apps	(Gls)
–2005	BK Skjold		
2005–2008	Brøndby IF		
2009–2014	Stabæk	31	(20)

International career^{‡}
2006–2014	Denmark	23	(10)
- * Club domestic league appearances and goals ‡ National team caps and goals as of 18 December 2007

Maiken With Pape (born 20 February 1978) is a Danish retired international football striker and former professional tennis player.

In January 2009, she signed to play for Stabæk in Norway. She has previously played for Brøndby.

== Football career statistics ==
Statistics accurate as of match played 8 June 2013

Club	Season	Division	League		Cup		Total	
Club	Season	Division	Apps	Goals	Apps	Goals	Apps	Goals
2009	Stabæk	Toppserien	15	9	1	0	16	9
2010	Stabæk	Toppserien	14	11	1	0	15	11
2011	Stabæk	Toppserien	0	0	0	0	0	0
2012	Stabæk	Toppserien	0	0	1	0	1	0
2013	Stabæk	Toppserien	2	0	0	0	2	0
Career Total			31	20	3	0	34	20

== Tennis ==
Maiken Pape
- Country (sports): Denmark
- Born: 20 February 1978 (age 48)
- Turned pro: 1994
- Retired: 1999
- Prize money: $1,890

Singles
- Career record: 1-3

Doubles
- Career record: 18–6
- Career titles: 0 WTA, 4 ITF
- Highest ranking: No. 484 (15 December 1997)

Pape also has a career high WTA doubles ranking of 484 achieved on 15 December 1997. Pape has won 4 ITF doubles titles. Pape was in the early 1990s, with moderate success, a professional tennis player.

Pape retirement from professional Tennis career in 1999.

== ITF Circuit finals ==
$100,000 tournaments
$75,000 tournaments
$50,000 tournaments
$25,000 tournaments
$10,000 tournaments

=== Doubles: 5 (4-1) ===
Result	No	Date	Tournament	Surface	Partner	Opponents	Score
Win	1.	4 February 1996	Rungsted, Denmark	Carpet (i)	(Denmark) Sofie Albinus	(Sweden) Sofia Finér (Sweden) Annica Lindstedt	3–6, 6–3, 6–4
Win	2.	22 December 1996	Cape Town, South Africa	Hard	(Denmark) Charlotte Aagaard	(South Africa) Natalie Grandin (South Africa) Alicia Pillay	5–7, 6–2, 6–3
Loss	1.	20 October 1997	Joué-lès-Tours, France	Hard (i)	(Denmark) Eva Dyrberg	(Czech Republic) Milena Nekvapilová (Czech Republic) Hana Šromová	7–5, 3–6, 4–6
Win	3.	19 January 1998	Bastad, Sweden	Hard (i)	(Denmark) Charlotte Aagaard	(Czech Republic) Gabriela Chmelinová (Czech Republic) Michaela Paštiková	7–6^{(7–5)}, 6–3
Win	4.	2 November 1998	Rungsted, Denmark	Hard (i)	(Denmark) Charlotte Aagaard	(Turkey) Gülberk Gültekin (Germany) Karina Karner	6–4, 6–2

== Personal life ==
Pape is in a relationship with fellow former football player, Katrine Pedersen.
