= Annica Lindstedt =

Swedish tennis player

- Country (sports): Sweden
- Born: 13 April 1978 (age 46)
- Turned pro: 1994
- Retired: 1998
- Prize money: $20,446

Singles
- Career record: 47–31
- Career titles: 3 ITF
- Highest ranking: No. 401 (17 June 1996)

Doubles
- Career record: 77–24
- Career titles: 15 ITF
- Highest ranking: No. 139 (5 January 1998)

Annica Lindstedt (born 13 April 1978) is a Swedish former professional tennis player. During her career, she won three singles titles and 15 doubles titles on the ITF Women's Circuit.

== Career highlights ==
On 5 January 1998, Lindstedt reached her highest doubles ranking: world number 139. Her highest singles ranking was on 17 June 1996, when she became world number 401. In her career, she won $20,446. In October 1996, with her partner Anna-Karin Svensson, she won the $25k event in Flensburg. In September 1997, she won the $25,000 Kyiv, partnering with Germany's Caroline Schneider.

== ITF Circuit finals ==
Legend
$100,000 tournaments
$75,000 tournaments
$50,000 tournaments
$25,000 tournaments
$10,000 tournaments

=== Singles: (3-1) ===
Result	No.	Date	Tournament	Surface	Opponent	Score
Win	1.	26 June 1995	Båstad, Sweden	Clay	(Germany) Claudia Timm	6–1, 6–4
Win	2.	26 May 1996	Olsztyn, Poland	Clay	(Poland) Ewa Radzikowska	6–3, 6–3
Loss	3.	23 June 1997	Båstad, Sweden	Clay	(Hungary) Nóra Köves	6–4, 6–7^{(4–7)}, 2–6
Win	4.	20 July 1997	Bella Cup Toruń, Poland	Clay	(Poland) Sylwia Rynarzewska	6–1, 6–0

=== Doubles (15-5) ===
Result	No.	Date	Tournament	Surface	Partner	Opponents	Score
Win	1.	3 July 1995	Lohja, Finland	Clay	(Sweden) Sofia Finér	(Sweden) Maria-Farnes Capistrano (Sweden) Maria Wolfbrandt	7–5, 6–4
Win	2.	2 October 1995	Nottingham, United Kingdom	Hard (i)	(Sweden) Sofia Finér	(United Kingdom) Samantha Smith (United Kingdom) Jane Wood	7–6^{(9–7)}, 7–5
Loss	3.	30 October 1995	Stockholm, Sweden	Hard (i)	(Sweden) Sofia Finér	(Denmark) Karin Ptaszek (Sweden) Anna-Karin Svensson	1–6, 3–6
Loss	4.	21 January 1996	Turku, Finland	Carpet (i)	(Sweden) Sofia Finér	(Denmark) Karin Ptaszek (Sweden) Anna-Karin Svensson	2–6, 4–6
Loss	5.	27 January 1996	Bastad, Sweden	Hard (i)	(Sweden) Sofia Finér	(Denmark) Karin Ptaszek (Sweden) Anna-Karin Svensson	3–6, 4–6
Loss	6.	4 February 1996	Rungsted, Denmark	Carpet (i)	(Sweden) Sofia Finér	(Denmark) Sofie Albinus (Denmark) Maiken Pape	6–3, 3–6, 4–6
Win	7.	31 March 1996	Caen, France	Clay (i)	(Sweden) Anna-Karin Svensson	(United Kingdom) Claire Taylor (United Kingdom) Amanda Wainwright	6–4, 7–6
Win	8.	7 April 1996	Athens, Greece	Clay	(Sweden) Anna-Karin Svensson	(Federal Republic of Yugoslavia) Dragana Zarić (Germany) Marlene Weingärtner	6–0, 6–2
Win	9.	30 June 1996	Bastad, Sweden	Clay	(Sweden) Anna-Karin Svensson	(Germany) Tanja Karsten (Czech Republic) Karin Baleková	6–2, 6–4
Win	10.	20 October 1996	Flensburg, Germany	Carpet (i)	(Sweden) Anna-Karin Svensson	(Czech Republic) Květa Peschke (Poland) Magdalena Feistel	6–4, 6–2
Win	11.	26 January 1997	Bastad, Sweden	Hard (i)	(Federal Republic of Yugoslavia) Dragana Zarić	(Sweden) Anna-Karin Svensson (Belgium) Patty Van Acker	6–7, 7–6, 6–3
Win	12.	2 February 1997	Rungsted, Denmark	Carpet (i)	(Finland) Linda Jansson	(Croatia) Kristina Pojatina (Federal Republic of Yugoslavia) Dragana Zarić	4–6, 7–5, 6–4
Win	13.	9 February 1997	Reykjavík, Iceland	Carpet (i)	(Finland) Linda Jansson	(Hungary) Adrienn Hegedűs (Hungary) Nóra Köves	4–6, 6–1, 6–2
Win	14.	29 June 1997	Bastad, Sweden	Clay	(Sweden) Anna-Karin Svensson	(Sweden) Sofia Finér (Finland) Linda Jansson	w/o
Win	15.	7 July 1997	Lohja, Finland	Clay	(Netherlands) Annemarie Mikkers	(Finland) Hanna-Katri Aalto (Finland) Kirsi Lampinen	6–1, 6–1
Loss	16.	4 August 1997	Rebecq, Belgium	Clay	(Netherlands) Annemarie Mikkers	(Netherlands) Kim Kilsdonk (Netherlands) Jolanda Mens	3–6, 4–6
Win	17.	11 August 1997	Koksijde, Belgium	Clay	(Netherlands) Annemarie Mikkers	(France) Kildine Chevalier (France) Laetitia Sanchez	6–1, 7–5
Win	18.	7 September 1997	Bad Nauheim, Germany	Clay	(Argentina) Luciana Masante	(Netherlands) Debby Haak (Netherlands) Maaike Koutstaal	6–2, 6–2
Win	19.	14 September 1997	Kyiv, Ukraine	Clay	(Germany) Caroline Schneider	(Ukraine) Natalia Medvedeva (Ukraine) Angelina Zdorovitskaia	6–1, 6–2
Win	20.	2 November 1997	Stockholm, Sweden	Carpet (i)	(Sweden) Anna-Karin Svensson	(Czech Republic) Olga Vymetálková (Czech Republic) Jana Macurová	3–6, 7–5, 6–3
