= Petra Thorén =

Finnish tennis player

- Full name: Petra Maria Thorén
- Country (sports): Finland
- Born: August 8, 1969 (age 56)
- Retired: 1996
- Prize money: $247,349

Singles
- Career record: 180–150
- Career titles: 5 ITF
- Highest ranking: No. 73 (23 March 1992)

Grand Slam singles results
- Australian Open: 2R (1990, 1993)
- French Open: 3R (1991)
- Wimbledon: 2R (1992)
- US Open: 1R (1991, 1992)

Doubles
- Career record: 98–73
- Career titles: 1 ITF
- Highest ranking: No. 112 (25 April 1994)

Grand Slam doubles results
- Australian Open: 2R (1991)
- French Open: 1R (1993)
- US Open: 1R (1991)

Petra Maria Thorén (born 8 August 1969) is a former tennis player from Finland.

Thorén won five singles titles and one doubles title on the ITF Women's Circuit. On 23 March 1992, she reached her best singles ranking of world No. 73. On 25 April 1994, she peaked at No. 112 in the WTA doubles rankings.

Playing for Finland Fed Cup team, Thorén has a win–loss record of 18–17 in Fed Cup competition.

== ITF finals ==
$25,000 tournaments
$10,000 tournaments

=== Singles (5–4) ===
Result	No.	Date	Location	Surface	Opponent	Score
Loss	1.	26 January 1987	Stavanger, Norway	Carpet (i)	(Sweden) Maria Strandlund	6–7, 2–6
Win	2.	25 April 1988	Sutton, United Kingdom	Clay	(Italy) Marina Bottazzi	7–5, 6–1
Win	3.	9 May 1988	Lee-on-Solent, United Kingdom	Clay	(United States) Melissa Mazzotta	6–2, 6–3
Win	4.	23 January 1989	Helsinki, Finland	Hard (i)	(Finland) Anne Aallonen	6–3, 2–6, 6–4
Win	5.	15 May 1989	Jaffa, Israel	Hard	(Brazil) Luciana Tella	7–5, 6–2
Loss	6.	12 June 1989	Modena, Italy	Clay	(Argentina) Florencia Labat	6–3, 3–6, 2–6
Loss	7.	23 April 1990	Ramat HaSharon, Israel	Hard	(South Africa) Mariaan de Swardt	1–6, 4–6
Win	8.	29 November 1993	Ramat HaSharon, Israel	Hard	(Israel) Anna Smashnova	6–3, 6–3
Loss	9.	7 July 1996	Lohja, Finland	Clay	(Denmark) Sofie Albinus	1–6, 6–1, 1–6

=== Doubles (1–4) ===
Result	No.	Date	Location	Surface	Partner	Opponents	Score
Loss	1.	29 February 1988	Jaffa, Israel	Hard	(Israel) Dalia Koriat	(Sweden) Eva Lena Olsson (Sweden) Lena Sandin	6–4, 5–7, 2–6
Loss	2.	30 October 1988	Baden, Switzerland	Hard (i)	(Poland) Katarzyna Nowak	(Australia) Kate McDonald (Australia) Rennae Stubbs	2–6, 0–6
Loss	3.	13 June 1993	Ashkelon, Israel	Hard	(Israel) Yael Segal	(Netherlands) Seda Noorlander (Netherlands) Sandra van der Aa	4–6, 4–6
Win	4.	16 January 1995	Turku, Finland	Hard (i)	(Finland) Nanne Dahlman	(Finland) Linda Jansson (Sweden) Anna-Karin Svensson	6–3, 6–4
Loss	5.	27 August 1995	Sochi, Russia	Hard	(Russia) Natalia Egorova	(United States) Corina Morariu (Ukraine) Elena Tatarkova	3–6, 5–7
