= Sandra Kleinová =

Czech tennis player

- Full name: Sandra Kleinová
- Country (sports): Czech Republic
- Residence: Prague, Czech Republic
- Born: 8 May 1978 (age 46); Prague, Czechoslovakia
- Height: 1.77 m (5 ft 9 1/2 in)
- Turned pro: 1993
- Retired: 2007
- Plays: Right-handed (two-handed backhand)
- Prize money: $770,761

Singles
- Career record: 333–349
- Career titles: 6 ITF
- Highest ranking: No. 41 (5 January 1998)

Grand Slam singles results
- Australian Open: 3R (1997)
- French Open: 2R (2003)
- Wimbledon: 2R (2004)
- US Open: 2R (2000)

Doubles
- Career record: 54–85
- Career titles: 4 ITF
- Highest ranking: No. 209 (12 June 2000)

Sandra Kleinová (born 8 May 1978) is a retired Czech tennis player.

Born in Prague, Kleinová reached the Fed Cup final in Nagoya in 1995. She was part of the Czech Republic Fed Cup team in 1997.

Her highest WTA singles ranking is 41st, which she reached in 1998, and her career high in doubles was at 209, set on 12 June 2000.

Kleinová was again part of the Czech Republic Fed Cup team in 2002. She defeated Elena Dementieva in the first round of Wimbledon in 2004.

== WTA career finals ==
=== Singles: 1 (runner-up) ===
Legend
Tier I (0)
Tier II (0)
Tier III (0)
Tier IV & V (1)

| Result | No. | Date | Tournament | Surface | Opponent | Score |
|---|---|---|---|---|---|---|
| Loss | 1. | Sep 1995 | Nagoya, Japan | Carpet (i) | (United States) Linda Wild | 4–6, 2–6 |

== ITF finals ==
Legend
$50,000 tournaments
$25,000 tournaments
$10,000 tournaments

=== Singles (6–4) ===
| Result | No. | Date | Tournament | Surface | Opponent | Score |
|---|---|---|---|---|---|---|
| Win | 1. | 16 January 1995 | Turku, Finland | Hard (i) | (Sweden) Sofia Finér | 6–4, 7–6^{(4)} |
| Win | 2. | 30 January 1995 | Rungsted, Denmark | Carpet (i) | (Denmark) Karin Ptaszek | 6–2, 6–7, 6–1 |
| Loss | 1. | 20 February 1995 | Newcastle, United Kingdom | Carpet (i) | (Russia) Olga Ivanova | 1–6, 1–6 |
| Win | 3. | 21 February 1999 | Redbridge, UK | Hard (i) | (United Kingdom) Louise Latimer | 6–2, 6–1 |
| Win | 4. | 19 December 1999 | Průhonice, Czech Republic | Hard (i) | (Germany) Adriana Jerabek | 6–2, 6–3 |
| Loss | 2. | 28 July 2002 | Český Krumlov, Czech Republic | Clay | (Czech Republic) Libuše Průšová | 6–3, 4–6, 3–6 |
| Loss | 3. | 22 September 2002 | Biella, Italy | Clay | (Italy) Flavia Pennetta | 3–6, 2–6 |
| Loss | 4. | 13 October 2002 | Cardiff, United Kingdom | Hard (i) | (France) Stéphanie Cohen-Aloro | 1–6, 1–6 |
| Win | 5. | 30 January 2005 | Belfort, France | Hard (i) | (Bulgaria) Tsvetana Pironkova | 6–4, 6–3 |
| Win | 6. | 9 October 2005 | Bolton, United Kingdom | Hard (i) | (Russia) Yaroslava Shvedova | 0–6, 6–3, 6–3 |

=== Doubles (4–2) ===
| Result | No. | Date | Tournament | Surface | Partner | Opponents | Score |
|---|---|---|---|---|---|---|---|
| Win | 1. | 11 December 1994 | Vítkovice, Czech Republic | Hard (i) | (Czech Republic) Denisa Chládková | (Czech Republic) Jindra Gabrišová (Czech Republic) Dominika Gorecká | 6–4, 0–6, 7–6 |
| Win | 2. | 23 January 1995 | Båstad, Sweden | Hard (i) | (Czech Republic) Jana Lubasová | (Finland) Linda Jansson (Sweden) Anna-Karin Svensson | 6–4, 7–6 |
| Loss | 3. | 20 February 1995 | Newcastle, United Kingdom | Carpet (i) | (Czech Republic) Ludmila Varmužová | (Netherlands) Seda Noorlander (Greece) Christína Papadáki | 6–7^{(3)}, 3–6 |
| Win | 4. | 3 November 1996 | Stockholm, Sweden | Hard (i) | (Czech Republic) Helena Vildová | (Finland) Nanne Dahlman (Sweden) Maria Strandlund | 7–5, 6–4 |
| Win | 5. | 1 December 2002 | Průhonice, Czech Republic | Carpet (i) | (Slovakia) Ľubomíra Kurhajcová | (Czech Republic) Libuše Průšová (Czech Republic) Renata Voráčová | 7–6^{(12)}, 6–3 |
| Loss | 6. | 21 November 2004 | Prague, Czech Republic | Hard (i) | (Czech Republic) Lucie Hradecká | (Czech Republic) Gabriela Chmelinová (Czech Republic) Michaela Paštiková | 3–6, 3–6 |
