= Jana Macurová =

Czech tennis player

- Full name: Jana Macurová
- Country (sports): Czech Republic
- Born: 14 October 1978 (age 46); Czechoslovakia
- Turned pro: 1994
- Retired: 2004
- Prize money: $56,950

Singles
- Career record: 200–141
- Career titles: 0 WTA, 6 ITF
- Highest ranking: 276 (8 September 1997)

Doubles
- Career record: 132–72
- Career titles: 0 WTA, 15 ITF
- Highest ranking: 200 (6 May 1996)

Jana Macurová (born 14 October 1978) is a former professional Czech tennis player.

Macurová received a career high singles ranking of world no. 276 and reached No. 200 in doubles during her professional career. She won 21 ITF titles during her career.

== ITF Circuit finals ==
$100,000 tournaments
$75,000/$80,000 tournaments
$50,000 tournaments
$25,000 tournaments
$10,000 tournaments

=== Singles (6–9) ===
Result	No.	Date	Tournament	Surface	Opponent	Score
Win	1.	23 July 1995	Toruń, Poland	Clay	(Czech Republic) Zuzana Lešenarová	6–2, 6–4
Loss	2.	13 August 1995	Paderborn, Germany	Clay	(Czech Republic) Ivana Havrlíková	3–6, 5–7
Loss	3.	27 August 1995	Valašské Meziříčí, Czech Republic	Clay	(Czech Republic) Alena Vašková	5–7, 7–5, 5–7
Loss	4.	9 October 1995	Burgdorf, Switzerland	Carpet	(Germany) Heike Thoms	1–6, 6–3, 2–6
Win	5.	16 October 1995	Langenthal, Switzerland	Carpet	(Germany) Renata Kochta	6–4, 7–6^{(3)}
Loss	6.	18 February 1996	Sheffield, United Kingdom	Hard (i)	(Russia) Evgenia Kulikovskaya	2–6, 3–6
Loss	7.	28 April 1996	Bari, Italy	Clay	(Italy) Antonella Serra Zanetti	6-3, 2-6, 5-7
Loss	8.	8 December 1996	Vítkovice, Czech Republic	Carpet (i)	(Czech Republic) Květa Peschke	2–6, 3–6
Win	9.	11 May 1997	Nitra, Slovakia	Clay	(Poland) Anna Bieleń-Żarska	6–4, 4–6, 6–3
Win	10.	18 May 1997	Prešov, Slovakia	Clay	(Czech Republic) Jana Ondrouchová	2-6, 6-2, 6-3
Loss	11.	10 August 1997	Paderborn, Germany	Clay	(Czech Republic) Jitka Schönfeldová	1–6, 6–7^{(3)}
Win	12.	27 July 1998	Toruń, Poland	Clay	(Germany) Cornelia Grünes	3–6, 6–4, 6–1
Win	13.	28 May 2001	Staré Splavy, Czech Republic	Clay	(Czech Republic) Hana Šromová	6–2, 4–6, 6–3
Loss	14.	2 September 2001	Bucharest, Romania	Clay	(Germany) Antonela Voina	6-3, 2-6, 2-6
Loss	15.	14 July 2002	Toruń, Poland	Clay	(Ukraine) Mariya Koryttseva	3–6, 0–6

=== Doubles (15–15) ===
Result	No.	Date	Tournament	Surface	Partner	Opponents	Score
Loss	1.	17 July 1995	Toruń, Poland	Clay	(Czech Republic) Milena Nekvapilová	(Czech Republic) Monika Maštalířová (Ukraine) Natalia Nemchinova	3–6, 6–7^{(2)}
Loss	2.	21 August 1995	Valašské Meziříčí, Czech Republic	Clay	(Czech Republic) Olga Vymetálková	(Czech Republic) Alena Havrlíková (Czech Republic) Jana Lubasová	6–7^{(2)}, 3–6
Win	3.	9 October 1995	Burgdorf, Switzerland	Carpet (i)	(Czech Republic) Olga Vymetálková	(Netherlands) Debby Haak (Netherlands) Martine Vosseberg	6–1, 6–3
Win	4.	16 October 1995	Langenthal, Switzerland	Carpet (i)	(Czech Republic) Olga Vymetálková	(Netherlands) Debby Haak (United States) Kristin Osmond	5–7, 6–4, 6–3
Loss	5.	13 November 1995	Bad Gögging, Germany	Carpet (i)	(Czech Republic) Olga Vymetálková	(Czech Republic) Eva Melicharová (Czech Republic) Helena Vildová	5–7, 3–6
Win	6.	22 April 1996	Bari, Italy	Clay	(Czech Republic) Olga Vymetálková	(Italy) Germana Di Natale (Romania) Andreea Ehritt-Vanc	6–4, 4–6, 7–5
Loss	7.	5 August 1996	Budapest, Hungary	Clay	(Czech Republic) Květa Hrdličková	(Germany) Syna Schreiber (Germany) Fruzsina Siklosi	2–6, 1–6
Loss	8.	3 March 1997	Buchen, Germany	Clay	(Czech Republic) Olga Vymetálková	(Germany) Nina Duebbers (Germany) Lisa Fritz	7–5, 3–6, 4–6
Win	9.	5 May 1997	Nitra, Slovakia	Clay	(Czech Republic) Olga Vymetálková	(Slovakia) Andrea Šebová (Slovakia) Gabriela Voleková	6–0, 0–6, 7–6^{(4)}
Loss	10.	12 May 1997	Prešov, Slovakia	Clay	(Czech Republic) Olga Vymetálková	(Czech Republic) Milena Nekvapilová (Czech Republic) Hana Šromová	6–2, 4–6, 2–6
Win	11.	14 June 1997	Kędzierzyn-Koźle, Poland	Clay	(Czech Republic) Milena Nekvapilová	(Czech Republic) Libuše Průšová (Czech Republic) Zuzana Průšová	6–4, 6–2
Win	12.	16 June 1997	Staré Splavy, Czech Republic	Clay	(Czech Republic) Gabriela Chmelinová	(Czech Republic) Kateřina Kroupová-Šišková (Czech Republic) Jana Ondrouchová	6–2, 6–2
Win	13.	7 July 1997	Fiumicino, Italy	Clay	(Czech Republic) Zuzana Hejdová	(Sweden) Sofia Finér (Russia) Anna Linkova	6–1, 6–1
Loss	14.	2 November 1997	Stockholm, Sweden	Hard (i)	(Czech Republic) Olga Vymetálková	(Sweden) Annica Lindstedt (Sweden) Anna-Karin Svensson	6–3, 5–7, 3–6
Loss	15.	30 March 1998	Athens, Greece	Clay	(Czech Republic) Gabriela Chmelinová	(Czech Republic) Milena Nekvapilová (Czech Republic) Hana Šromová	3–6, 5–7
Win	16.	27 July 1998	Toruń, Poland	Clay	(Czech Republic) Olga Vymetálková	(Czech Republic) Gabriela Chmelinová (Czech Republic) Petra Plačková	7–6^{(2)}, 6–0
Win	17.	24 August 1998	Plzeň, Czech Republic	Clay	(Czech Republic) Olga Vymetálková	(Czech Republic) Gabriela Chmelinová (Czech Republic) Veronika Raimrová	1–6, 6–2, 6–1
Win	18.	30 August 1999	Zadar, Croatia	Clay	(Czech Republic) Olga Vymetálková	(Netherlands) Natasha Galouza (Italy) Mara Santangelo	6–1, 6–3
Loss	19.	25 October 1999	Minsk, Belarus	Carpet (i)	(Czech Republic) Gabriela Chmelinová	(Belarus) Tatiana Poutchek (Belarus) Marina Stets	4–6, 2–6
Win	20.	7 February 2000	Mallorca, Spain	Clay	(Czech Republic) Gabriela Chmelinová	(Slovakia) Alena Paulenková (Slovakia) Andrea Šebová	6–2, 6–1
Loss	21.	3 June 2000	Staré Splavy, Czech Republic	Clay	(Czech Republic) Milena Nekvapilová	(Czech Republic) Andrea Plačková (Czech Republic) Pavlina Slitrová	3–6, 4–6
Loss	22.	5 June 2000	Vaduz, Liechtenstein	Clay	(Czech Republic) Zuzana Hejdová	(New Zealand) Rewa Hudson (New Zealand) Shelley Stephens	2–6, 6–2, 2–6
Loss	23.	31 July 2000	Toruń, Poland	Clay	(Czech Republic) Gabriela Chmelinová	(Czech Republic) Iveta Benešová (Czech Republic) Lenka Novotná	1–6, 4–6
Win	24.	29 April 2002	Dubrovnik, Croatia	Clay	(Czech Republic) Blanka Kumbárová	(Australia) Melissa Dowse (Slovakia) Linda Smolenaková	1–6, 6–4, 6–4
Loss	25.	30 July 2002	Bad Saulgau, Germany	Clay	(Czech Republic) Lenka Novotná	(Czech Republic) Gabriela Chmelinová (Czech Republic) Blanka Kumbárová	2–6, 0–6
Win	26.	29 September 2002	Trenčianske Teplice, Slovakia	Clay	(Czech Republic) Gabriela Chmelinová	(Czech Republic) Milena Nekvapilová (Czech Republic) Hana Šromová	2–1 ret.
Win	27.	13 October 2002	Makarska, Croatia	Clay	(Czech Republic) Lenka Novotná	(Serbia) Ana Timotić (Slovakia) Zuzana Zemenová	1–6, 6–3, 6–3
Win	28.	21 April 2003	Hvar, Croatia	Clay (i)	(Czech Republic) Gabriela Chmelinová	(Turkey) İpek Şenoğlu (Czech Republic) Vladimíra Uhlířová	6–4, 3–6, 6–1
Loss	29.	28 April 2003	Pula, Croatia	Clay	(Slovakia) Zuzana Zemenová	(Austria) Daniela Klemenschits (Austria) Sandra Klemenschits	2–6, 2–6
Loss	30.	8 June 2000	Staré Splavy, Czech Republic	Clay	(Czech Republic) Lenka Novotná	(Czech Republic) Iveta Gerlová (Czech Republic) Lucie Kriegsmannová	5–7, 3–6
