= Linda Jansson =

Finnish tennis player

- Country (sports): Finland
- Born: 10 September 1974 (age 50); Åland
- Prize money: $15,356

Singles
- Highest ranking: No. 488 (30 October 1995)

Doubles
- Highest ranking: No. 233 (17 July 1995)

Linda Jansson (born 10 September 1974) is a Finnish former professional tennis player.

== Biography ==
Jansson comes from Åland, a Swedish speaking autonomous region of Finland.

As a professional player she was most successful in doubles, with a best ranking of 233 and six ITF titles. She played the doubles rubber in ten Fed Cup ties for Finland, including a World Group quarterfinal against Australia in 1993, which was the team's best ever run in the competition. Outside of tennis, she also competed in the sport of racketlon and was the world champion in 2006, by which stage she was competing for Sweden.

Since retiring she has remained involved in tennis, as an administrator and coach in Sweden. She has served on the board of the Swedish Tennis Federation and was a tournament director for the WTA Tour event Nordic Light Open.

== ITF finals ==
=== Singles (0–2) ===
Result	No.	Date	Tournament	Surface	Opponent	Score
Loss	1.	19 March 1995	Gaborone, Botswana	Hard	(Zimbabwe) Cara Black	4–6, 2–6
Loss	2.	15 October 1995	La Paz, Bolivia	Clay	(Colombia) Carmiña Giraldo	2–6, 4–6

=== Doubles (6–7) ===
Result	No.	Date	Tournament	Surface	Partner	Opponents	Score
Loss	1.	17 January 1994	Turku, Finland	Carpet (i)	(Finland) Katrina Saarinen	(Czech Republic) Radka Suraková (Czech Republic) Helena Vildová	5–7, 3–6
Loss	2.	10 July 1994	Lohja, Finland	Clay	(Finland) Katrina Saarinen	(Sweden) Camilla Persson (Sweden) Anna-Karin Svensson	4–6, 3–6
Loss	3.	29 August 1994	London, United Kingdom	Grass	(Sweden) Anna-Karin Svensson	(Germany) Sabine Gerke (United States) Kristine Kurth	4–6, 4–6
Loss	4.	31 October 1994	Jūrmala, Latvia	Hard (i)	(Sweden) Anna-Karin Svensson	(Belarus) Natalia Noreiko (Belarus) Marina Stets	1–6, 5–7
Loss	5.	16 January 1995	Turku, Finland	Hard (i)	(Sweden) Anna-Karin Svensson	(Finland) Nanne Dahlman (Finland) Petra Thorén	3–6, 4–6
Loss	6.	23 January 1995	Båstad, Sweden	Hard (i)	(Sweden) Anna-Karin Svensson	(Czech Republic) Sandra Kleinová (Czech Republic) Jana Lubasová	4–6, 6–7
Win	1.	30 January 1995	Rungsted, Denmark	Carpet (i)	(Sweden) Anna-Karin Svensson	(Denmark) Anja Kostecki (Denmark) Karin Ptaszek	6–3, 6–1
Win	2.	8 October 1995	Lima, Peru	Hard	(Sweden) Maria-Farnes Capistrano	(Chile) Bárbara Castro (Chile) María-Alejandra Quezada	6–2, 2–6, 6–3
Win	3.	15 October 1995	La Paz, Bolivia	Clay	(Sweden) Maria-Farnes Capistrano	(Paraguay) Laura Bernal (Argentina) Paula Racedo	7–5, 6–2
Win	4.	9 September 1996	Bangkok, India	Hard	(Malaysia) Khoo Chin-bee	(South Korea) Kim Hye-jeong (Thailand) Chotika Wannachinda	6–2, 4–6, 6–3
Win	5.	2 February 1997	Rungsted, Denmark	Carpet (i)	(Sweden) Annica Lindstedt	(Croatia) Kristina Pojatina (Federal Republic of Yugoslavia) Dragana Zarić	4–6, 7–5, 6–4
Win	6.	9 February 1997	Reykjavík, Iceland	Carpet (i)	(Sweden) Annica Lindstedt	(Hungary) Adrienn Hegedűs (Hungary) Nóra Köves	4–6, 6–1, 6–2
Loss	7.	29 June 1997	Bastad, Sweden	Clay	(Sweden) Sofia Finér	(Sweden) Annica Lindstedt (Sweden) Anna-Karin Svensson	w/o
