= 2000 Sanex Trophy – Singles =

Singles
- 2000 Sanex Trophy

Final
- Champion: (Israel) Anna Smashnova
- Runner-up: (Belgium) Dominique Van Roost
- Score: 6–2, 7–5

Details
- Draw: 32 (2WC/4Q/2PR)
- Seeds: 8

Events
Singles	Doubles
← 1999 ·	WTA Knokke-Heist	· 2001 →

María Sánchez Lorenzo was the defending champion, but did not compete this year.

Anna Smashnova won the title by defeating Dominique Van Roost 6–2, 7–5 in the final.

== Seeds ==
1. (Belgium) Dominique Van Roost (final)
2. (Belgium) Sabine Appelmans (quarterfinals)
3. (Spain) Magüi Serna (semifinals)
4. (France) Sarah Pitkowski (quarterfinals)
5. (Hungary) Rita Kuti-Kis (first round)
6. (Israel) Anna Smashnova (champion)
7. (Belarus) ~~Natasha Zvereva~~ (withdrew)
8. (Spain) Marta Marrero (semifinals)
9. (Belarus) Olga Barabanschikova (first round)

== Draw ==
=== Key ===
- Q = Qualifier
- WC = Wild card
- LL = Lucky loser
- Alt = Alternate
- SE = Special exempt
- PR = Protected ranking
- ITF = ITF entry
- JE = Junior exempt
- w/o = Walkover
- r = Retired
- d = Defaulted
- SR = Special ranking

=== Finals ===
Semifinals
1	(Belgium) Dominique Van Roost	6	6
3	(Spain) Magüi Serna	3	0
6	(Israel) Anna Smashnova	6	6
8	(Spain) Marta Marrero	3	1

Final
1	(Belgium) Dominique Van Roost	2	5
6	(Israel) Anna Smashnova	6	7

=== Top half ===
First round
1	(Belgium) D Van Roost	6	6
PR	(Germany) M Babel	3	1
(Spain) A Medina Garrigues	6	6
WC	(United Kingdom) H Collin	3	2
(Czech Republic) S Kleinová	6	6
PR	(Czech Republic) R Bobková	1	0
Q	(Madagascar) D Randriantefy	6	6
9	(Belarus) O Barabanschikova	3	4
3	(Spain) M Serna	6	7^{7}
(France) É Loit	0	6^{5}
(Netherlands) A Hopmans	3	2^{r}
(Belgium) J Henin	6	1
WC	(Germany) S Werner	4	6	6^{5}
(Austria) P Wartusch	6	2	7^{7}
(Belgium) E Callens	6	7^{7}
5	(Hungary) R Kuti-Kis	2	6^{3}

Second round
1	(Belgium) D Van Roost	6	6
(Spain) A Medina Garrigues	1	4
(Czech Republic) S Kleinová	3	4
Q	(Madagascar) D Randriantefy	6	6
3	(Spain) M Serna	6	7^{7}
(Belgium) J Henin	4	6^{3}
(Austria) P Wartusch	6	6
(Belgium) E Callens	1	4

Quarterfinals
1	(Belgium) D Van Roost	6	6
Q	(Madagascar) D Randriantefy	1	2
3	(Spain) M Serna	6
(Austria) P Wartusch	0^{r}

Semifinals
1	(Belgium) D Van Roost	6	6
3	(Spain) M Serna	3	0

=== Bottom half ===
First round
6	(Israel) A Smashnova	6	6
(Bulgaria) P Nola	3	2
(Germany) A Glass	6	5	5
(Switzerland) E Gagliardi	2	7	7
(Netherlands) S Noorlander	6	6
(Switzerland) M Vavrinec	4	3
(Spain) C Torrens Valero	2	6	0
4	(France) S Pitkowski	6	2	6
8	(Spain) M Marrero	6	6
Q	(Slovakia) M Suchá	3	4
(Belgium) L Courtois	4	6	7
(Germany) B Rittner	6	3	5
(Germany) M Weingärtner	6	6
Q	(Uzbekistan) I Tulyaganova	4	2
(Italy) G Casoni	6	4	4
2	(Belgium) S Appelmans	3	6	6

Second round
6	(Israel) A Smashnova	6	6
(Switzerland) E Gagliardi	2	2
(Netherlands) S Noorlander	5	6	4
4	(France) S Pitkowski	7	4	6
8	(Spain) M Marrero	3	7	6
(Belgium) L Courtois	6	5	1
(Germany) M Weingärtner	4	3
2	(Belgium) S Appelmans	6	6

Quarterfinals
6	(Israel) A Smashnova	6	6
4	(France) S Pitkowski	1	1
8	(Spain) M Marrero	6	5	6
2	(Belgium) S Appelmans	3	7	3

Semifinals
6	(Israel) A Smashnova	6	6
8	(Spain) M Marrero	3	1

== Qualifying ==
=== Qualifying seeds ===
1. (Italy) Francesca Schiavone (qualifying competition)
2. (Uzbekistan) Iroda Tulyaganova (qualified)
3. (Spain) Nuria Llagostera Vives (qualifying competition)
4. (Denmark) Eva Dyrberg (first round)
5. (Netherlands) Yvette Basting (first round)
6. (Slovakia) Martina Suchá (qualified)
7. (United States) Samantha Reeves (qualifying competition)
8. (Spain) Mariam Ramón Climent (second round)

=== Qualifiers ===
1. (Slovakia) Martina Suchá
2. (Spain) Anabel Medina Garrigues
3. (Madagascar) Dally Randriantefy
4. (Uzbekistan) Iroda Tulyaganova

=== Protected ranking ===
1. (Germany) Meike Babel
2. (Czech Republic) Radka Bobková

=== Qualifying draw ===
==== First qualifier ====
First round
1	(Italy) Francesca Schiavone	6	6
(Germany) Nicole Seitenbecher	1	1
(Czech Republic) Lenka Němečková	6	6
(Australia) Natalie Dittman	0	0
(Czech Republic) Zuzana Hejdová	3	3
(Austria) Sybille Bammer	6	6
(Greece) Eleni Daniilidou	1	3
6	(Slovakia) Martina Suchá	6	6

Second round
1	(Italy) Francesca Schiavone	5	7	6
(Czech Republic) Lenka Němečková	7	5	4
(Austria) Sybille Bammer	7^{7}	5	5
6	(Slovakia) Martina Suchá	6^{3}	7	7

Qualifying competition
1	(Italy) Francesca Schiavone	6	2	5
6	(Slovakia) Martina Suchá	4	6	7

==== Second qualifier ====
First round
3	(Spain) Nuria Llagostera Vives	6	6
(Australia) Catherine Barclay	4	4
WC	(Belgium) Nele Landrieux	0	5
WC	(Spain) Julia Gandia	6	7
(Spain) Anabel Medina Garrigues	6	6
(Slovenia) Tina Hergold	3	3
WC	(Netherlands) Michelle Gerards	7^{7}	2	3
8	(Spain) Mariam Ramón Climent	6^{4}	6	6

Second round
3	(Spain) Nuria Llagostera Vives	6	6
(Spain) Julia Gandia	2	0
(Spain) Anabel Medina Garrigues	6	6
8	(Spain) Mariam Ramón Climent	1	2

Qualifying competition
3	(Spain) Nuria Llagostera Vives	1	2
(Spain) Anabel Medina Garrigues	6	6

==== Third qualifier ====
First round
5	(Netherlands) Yvette Basting	1	0
(Austria) Evelyn Fauth	6	6
(Czech Republic) Eva Martincová	6	6
(Germany) Julia Babilon	1	3
(Germany) Caroline Schneider	1	0
(Madagascar) Dally Randriantefy	6	6
(Germany) Marketa Kochta	6	6
4	(Denmark) Eva Dyrberg	2	2

Second round
(Austria) Evelyn Fauth	6	2	6
(Czech Republic) Eva Martincová	3	6	3
(Madagascar) Dally Randriantefy	6	6
(Germany) Marketa Kochta	3	2

Qualifying competition
(Austria) Evelyn Fauth	4	1
(Madagascar) Dally Randriantefy	6	6

==== Fourth qualifier ====
First round
7	(United States) Samantha Reeves	6	6
(Netherlands) Andrea van den Hurk	3	2
WC	(Luxembourg) Claudine Schaul	6	5	4
(Italy) Flavia Pennetta	2	7	6
(Germany) Gréta Arn	6	6
WC	(Belgium) Evy Last	1	2
(Belgium) Elke Clijsters	3	3
2	(Uzbekistan) Iroda Tulyaganova	6	6

Second round
7	(United States) Samantha Reeves	6	6
(Italy) Flavia Pennetta	1	1
(Germany) Gréta Arn	1	4
2	(Uzbekistan) Iroda Tulyaganova	6	6

Qualifying competition
7	(United States) Samantha Reeves	6	4	2
2	(Uzbekistan) Iroda Tulyaganova	2	6	6
