= 2000 Sanex Trophy =

- Date: 17–23 July
- Edition: 2nd
- Category: Tier IV
- Draw: 32S / 16D
- Prize money: $110,000
- Surface: Clay / outdoor
- Location: Knokke-Heist, Belgium

Champions

Singles
- (Israel) Anna Smashnova

Doubles
- (Italy) Giulia Casoni / (Uzbekistan) Iroda Tulyaganova
← 1999 ·	WTA Knokke-Heist	· 2001 →

The 2000 Sanex Trophy was a women's tennis tournament played on outdoor clay courts in Knokke-Heist, Belgium that was part of the Tier IV category of the 2000 WTA Tour. It was the second edition of the tournament and was held from 17 July until 23 July 2000. Sixth-seeded Anna Smashnova won the singles title and earned $16,000 first-prize money.

== Finals ==
=== Singles ===
(Israel) Anna Smashnova defeated (Belgium) Dominique van Roost, 6–2, 7–5

- It was Smashnova's 1st WTA singles title of the year and the 2nd of her career.

=== Doubles ===
(Italy) Giulia Casoni / (Uzbekistan) Iroda Tulyaganova defeated (Australia) Catherine Barclay / (Denmark) Eva Dyrberg, 2–6, 6–4, 6–4
