= 2000 Sanex Trophy – Doubles =

Doubles
- 2000 Sanex Trophy

Final
- Champions: (Italy) Giulia Casoni (Uzbekistan) Iroda Tulyaganova
- Runners-up: (Australia) Catherine Barclay (Denmark) Eva Dyrberg
- Score: 2–6, 6–4, 6–4

Details
- Draw: 16 (1WC/1Q)
- Seeds: 4

Events
Singles	Doubles
← 1999 ·	WTA Knokke-Heist	· 2001 →

Eva Martincová and Elena Wagner were the defending champions, but Wagner did not compete this year. Martincová teamed up with Émilie Loit and lost in first round to Meike Babel and Laurence Courtois.

Giulia Casoni and Iroda Tulyaganova won the title by defeating Catherine Barclay and Eva Dyrberg 2–6, 6–4, 6–4 in the final.

== Seeds ==
1. (Belgium) Sabine Appelmans / (Germany) Barbara Rittner (first round)
2. (France) Émilie Loit / (Czech Republic) Eva Martincová (first round)
3. (Netherlands) Amanda Hopmans / (Spain) Cristina Torrens Valero (quarterfinals)
4. (Italy) Giulia Casoni / (Uzbekistan) Iroda Tulyaganova (champions)

== Draw ==
=== Key ===
- Q = Qualifier
- WC = Wild card
- LL = Lucky loser
- Alt = Alternate
- SE = Special exempt
- PR = Protected ranking
- ITF = ITF entry
- JE = Junior exempt
- w/o = Walkover
- r = Retired
- d = Defaulted
- SR = Special ranking

=== Draw ===
First round
1	(Belgium) S Appelmans (Germany) B Rittner	6	2	1
(Slovenia) T Hergold (Germany) M Kochta	2	6	6
Q	(Germany) G Arn (Germany) C Schneider	3	2
(Switzerland) E Gagliardi (Austria) P Wartusch	6	6
3	(Netherlands) A Hopmans (Spain) C Torrens Valero	6	6
(Hungary) V Csurgó (Hungary) R Kuti-Kis	2	3
(Australia) C Barclay (Denmark) E Dyrberg	6	6
(Netherlands) D Haak (Netherlands) A van den Hurk	3	4
WC	(United Kingdom) H Collin (Greece) E Daniilidou	6	2	3
(Belarus) O Barabanschikova (France) S Pitkowski	4	6	6
(Netherlands) Y Basting (Italy) F Pennetta	3	7^{7}	1
4	(Italy) G Casoni (Uzbekistan) I Tulyaganova	6	6^{2}	6
(Czech Republic) R Bobková (Spain) M Ramón Climent	7	4	6
(Spain) M Marrero (Netherlands) S Noorlander	5	6	4
(Germany) M Babel (Belgium) L Courtois	5	6	6
2	(France) É Loit (Czech Republic) E Martincová	7	4	4

Quarterfinals
(Slovenia) T Hergold (Germany) M Kochta	w/o
(Switzerland) E Gagliardi (Austria) P Wartusch
3	(Netherlands) A Hopmans (Spain) C Torrens Valero	1	6	3
(Australia) C Barclay (Denmark) E Dyrberg	6	3	6
(Belarus) O Barabanschikova (France) S Pitkowski	6^{3}	2
4	(Italy) G Casoni (Uzbekistan) I Tulyaganova	7^{7}	6
(Czech Republic) R Bobková (Spain) M Ramón Climent	5	6	2
(Germany) M Babel (Belgium) L Courtois	7	2	6

Semifinals
(Slovenia) T Hergold (Germany) M Kochta	3	2
(Australia) C Barclay (Denmark) E Dyrberg	6	6
4	(Italy) G Casoni (Uzbekistan) I Tulyaganova	6	6
(Germany) M Babel (Belgium) L Courtois	1	1

Final
(Australia) C Barclay (Denmark) E Dyrberg	6	4	4
4	(Italy) G Casoni (Uzbekistan) I Tulyaganova	2	6	6

== Qualifying ==
=== Qualifying seeds ===
1. (Germany) Gréta Arn / (Germany) Caroline Schneider (qualified)
2. (Spain) Nuria Llagostera Vives / (Italy) Francesca Schiavone (first round)

=== Qualifiers ===
1. (Germany) Gréta Arn / (Germany) Caroline Schneider

=== Qualifying draw ===
First round
1	(Germany) Gréta Arn (Germany) Caroline Schneider	8
(Germany) Andrea Glass (Germany) Scarlett Werner	4
(Austria) Evelyn Fauth (Switzerland) Miroslava Vavrinec	8
2	(Spain) Nuria Llagostera Vives (Italy) Francesca Schiavone	6

Qualifying competition
1	(Germany) Gréta Arn (Germany) Caroline Schneider	5	6	6
(Austria) Evelyn Fauth (Switzerland) Miroslava Vavrinec	7	3	0
