= 2002 NASDAQ-100 Open – Women's singles =

Women's singles
- 2002 NASDAQ-100 Open

Final
- Champion: (United States) Serena Williams
- Runner-up: (United States) Jennifer Capriati
- Score: 7–5, 7–6^{(7–4)}

Details
- Draw: 96 (9WC/12Q/2LL)
- Seeds: 32

Events
Singles	men	women
Doubles	men	women
← 2001 ·	Miami Open	· 2003 →

Serena Williams defeated Jennifer Capriati in the final, 7–5, 7–6^{(7–4)} to win the women's singles tennis title at the 2002 Miami Open. Serena became the second player in the Open Era, after Steffi Graf, to defeat the world's top-three ranked players at the same event; defeating world No. 3 Martina Hingis in the quarterfinals, No. 2 Venus Williams in the semifinals, and No. 1 Capriati in the final. Serena did not lose a set during the tournament.

Venus Williams was the defending champion, but lost to her sister, Serena Williams, in the semifinals.

== Seeds ==
All seeds received a bye into the second round.

1. (United States) Jennifer Capriati (finals)
2. (United States) Venus Williams (semifinals)
3. (Switzerland) Martina Hingis (quarterfinals)
4. (Belgium) Kim Clijsters (quarterfinals)
5. (United States) Monica Seles (semifinals)
6. (Belgium) Justine Henin (second round)
7. (Federal Republic of Yugoslavia) Jelena Dokić (third round)
8. (United States) Serena Williams (champion)
9. (Italy) Silvia Farina Elia (fourth round)
10. (United States) Meghann Shaughnessy (third round)
11. (Spain) Arantxa Sánchez Vicario (fourth round)
12. (Russia) Elena Dementieva (quarterfinals)
13. (Slovakia) Daniela Hantuchová (second round)
14. (South Africa) Amanda Coetzer (fourth round)
15. (Uzbekistan) Iroda Tulyaganova (fourth round)
16. (Bulgaria) Magdalena Maleeva (third round)
17. (United States) Lisa Raymond (third round)
18. (Thailand) Tamarine Tanasugarn (third round)
19. (Austria) Barbara Schett (third round)
20. (Czech Republic) Dája Bedáňová (second round)
21. (Spain) Ángeles Montolio (second round)
22. (Italy) Francesca Schiavone (second round)
23. (United States) Alexandra Stevenson (fourth round)
24. (Japan) Ai Sugiyama (third round)
25. (Italy) Rita Grande (second round)
26. (Luxembourg) Anne Kremer (fourth round)
27. (Slovakia) Henrieta Nagyová (second round)
28. (Russia) Tatiana Panova (quarterfinals)
29. (Spain) Cristina Torrens Valero (second round)
30. (Switzerland) Patty Schnyder (second round)
31. (France) Nathalie Dechy (second round)
32. (Russia) Anastasia Myskina (third round)

== Draw ==
=== Key ===
- Q = Qualifier
- WC = Wild card
- LL = Lucky loser
- Alt = Alternate
- SE = Special exempt
- PR = Protected ranking
- ITF = ITF entry
- JE = Junior exempt
- w/o = Walkover
- r = Retired
- d = Defaulted
- SR = Special ranking

=== Finals ===
Quarter-finals
1	(United States) Jennifer Capriati	6	6
28	(Russia) Tatiana Panova	2	0
4	(Belgium) Kim Clijsters	6	3	3
5	(United States) Monica Seles	4	6	6
8	(United States) Serena Williams	6	6
3	(Switzerland) Martina Hingis	4	0
12	(Russia) Elena Dementieva	7	3	2
2	(United States) Venus Williams	5	6	6

Semi-finals
1	(United States) Jennifer Capriati	4	6	7^{7}
5	(United States) Monica Seles	6	3	6^{4}
8	(United States) Serena Williams	6	6
2	(United States) Venus Williams	2	2

Final
1	(United States) Jennifer Capriati	5	6^{4}
8	(United States) Serena Williams	7	7^{7}

=== Top half ===
==== Section 1 ====
First round
(Greece) E Daniilidou	7	6
WC	(Russia) A Kounikova	5	3
(United States) A Frazier	4	2
(Hungary) G Arn	6	6
(United States) B Rippner	6^{0}	3
(Hungary) P Mandula	7	6
WC	(United States) A Harkleroad	4	4
(Germany) M Müller	6	6

Second round
1	(United States) J Capriati	6	6
(Greece) E Daniilidou	0	3
(Hungary) G Arn	6	2	2
32	(Russia) A Myskina	3	6	6
24	(Japan) A Sugiyama	6	7
(Hungary) P Mandula	3	5
(Germany) M Müller	3	2
15	(Uzbekistan) I Tulyaganova	6	6

Third round
1	(United States) J Capriati	3	7	6
32	(Russia) A Myskina	6	5	2
24	(Japan) A Sugiyama	6	4	5
15	(Uzbekistan) I Tulyaganova	3	6	7

Fourth round
1	(United States) J Capriati	7	5	6
15	(Uzbekistan) I Tulyaganova	5	7	1

==== Section 2 ====
First round
(Czech Republic) K Hrdličková	6	6
WC	(United States) CA Avants	1	1
(Indonesia) W Prakusya	7	7
(Slovakia) M Suchá	5	5
(Switzerland) M-G Mikaelian	6	7
(Slovakia) J Husárová	4	5
(Israel) A Smashnova	6	6
(Germany) B Lamade	4	1

Second round
11	(Spain) A Sánchez Vicario	6	6
(Czech Republic) K Hrdličková	4	3
(Indonesia) W Prakusya	2	4
17	(United States) L Raymond	6	6
28	(Russia) T Panova	2	6	7
(Switzerland) M-G Mikaelian	6	1	5
(Israel) A Smashnova	6^{6}	6	6
6	(Belgium) J Henin	7	3	4

Third round
11	(Spain) A Sánchez Vicario	6	7
17	(United States) L Raymond	2	6^{2}
28	(Russia) T Panova	2	7	6
(Israel) A Smashnova	6	5	1

Fourth round
11	(Spain) A Sánchez Vicario	1	6^{8}
28	(Russia) T Panova	6	7

==== Section 3 ====
First round
(France) S Foretz	6	6
(Italy) A Serra Zanetti	3	4
(Argentina) P Suárez	5	6	6
LL	(Netherlands) M Oremans	7	4	2
(Slovenia) T Pisnik	6	6
(Czech Republic) A Gerši	1	3
(Zimbabwe) C Black	6	6
(Slovenia) M Matevžič	0	4

Second round
4	(Belgium) K Clijsters	6	6
(France) S Foretz	2	3
(Argentina) P Suárez	6	6
25	(Italy) R Grande	3	3
22	(Italy) F Schiavone	4	1
(Slovenia) T Pisnik	6	6
(Zimbabwe) C Black	4	6	6
13	(Slovakia) D Hantuchová	6	4	1

Third round
4	(Belgium) K Clijsters	6	6
(Argentina) P Suárez	4	4
(Slovenia) T Pisnik	4	5
(Zimbabwe) C Black	7	7

Fourth round
4	(Belgium) K Clijsters	6	6
(Zimbabwe) C Black	4	2

==== Section 4 ====
First round
(Italy) T Garbin	4	1
(Russia) E Likhovtseva	6	6
(Tunisia) S Sfar	2	2
(Spain) M Marrero	6	6
WC	(United States) S Reeves	3	6	6
LL	(Croatia) S Talaja	6	2	2
WC	(Spain) C Martínez	7	6
(United States) J Hopkins	5	2

Second round
9	(Italy) S Farina Elia	6	6
(Russia) E Likhovtseva	1	4
(Spain) M Marrero	4	1
18	(Thailand) R Tanasugarn	6	6
30	(Switzerland) P Schnyder	4	0
WC	(United States) S Reeves	6	6
WC	(Spain) C Martínez	7	4	3
5	(United States) M Seles	5	6	6

Third round
9	(Italy) S Farina Elia	6	6
18	(Thailand) R Tanasugarn	3	2
WC	(United States) S Reeves	3	2
5	(United States) M Seles	6	6

Fourth round
9	(Italy) S Farina Elia	6^{4}	4
5	(United States) M Seles	7	6

=== Bottom half ===
==== Section 5 ====
First round
(United States) L Osterloh	5	7	6
(Spain) V Ruano Pascual	6	5	3
WC	(Croatia) M Lučić	2	4
WC	(Slovenia) K Srebotnik	6	6
(United States) M Irvin	6	7
(Russia) E Bovina	2	6^{1}
Q	(Canada) V Webb	6	6
(Spain) M Serna	3	2

Second round
8	(United States) S Williams	7	6
(United States) L Osterloh	5	1
WC	(Slovenia) K Srebotnik	7	6
29	(Spain) C Torrens Valero	5	4
20	(Czech Republic) D Bedáňová	6^{5}	2
(United States) M Irvin	7	6
Q	(Canada) V Webb	4	4
10	(United States) M Shaughnessy	6	6

Third round
8	(United States) S Williams	6	6
WC	(Slovenia) K Srebotnik	1	0
(United States) M Irvin	4	6	6
10	(United States) M Shaughnessy	6	3	4

Fourth round
8	(United States) S Williams	6	6
(United States) M Irvin	1	4

==== Section 6 ====
First round
Q	(Russia) V Zvonareva	6	2	5
(Croatia) I Majoli	2	6	7
(Australia) R McQuillan	3	4
Q	(Australia) E Dominikovic	6	6
(Belarus) T Poutchek	6	6^{6}	7
(United States) M Tu	4	7	5
Q	(Chinese Taipei) J Lee	6	2	7
(Paraguay) R Neffa-de los Ríos	3	6	6^{1}

Second round
16	(Bulgaria) M Maleeva	6	5	6
(Croatia) I Majoli	1	7	0
Q	(Australia) E Dominikovic	3	2
23	(United States) A Stevenson	6	6
31	(France) N Dechy	3	6	0
(Belarus) T Poutchek	6	0	6
Q	(Chinese Taipei) J Lee	1	0
3	(Switzerland) M Hingis	6	6

Third round
16	(Bulgaria) M Maleeva	3	5
23	(United States) A Stevenson	6	7
(Belarus) T Poutchek	0	1
3	(Switzerland) M Hingis	6	6

Fourth round
23	(United States) A Stevenson	2	0
3	(Switzerland) M Hingis	6	6

==== Section 7 ====
First round
(United States) K Brandi	1	1
(Germany) M Weingärtner	6	6
(Ukraine) T Perebiynis	6	6
(Australia) A Molik	1	4
WC	(Argentina) G Dulko	4
WC	(United States) S Taylor	1	r
(Switzerland) E Gagliardi	6	6
(Germany) J Kandarr	0	3

Second round
7	(Federal Republic of Yugoslavia) J Dokić	6	6
(Germany) M Weingärtner	3	2
(Ukraine) T Perebiynis	6	2	5
26	(Luxembourg) A Kremer	3	6	7
19	(Austria) B Schett	6	6
WC	(Argentina) G Dulko	1	2
(Switzerland) E Gagliardi	0	4
12	(Russia) E Dementieva	6	6

Third round
7	(Federal Republic of Yugoslavia) J Dokić	3	1
26	(Luxembourg) A Kremer	6	6
19	(Austria) B Schett	6^{3}	2
12	(Russia) E Dementieva	7	6

Fourth round
26	(Luxembourg) A Kremer	6	5	6^{14}
12	(Russia) E Dementieva	1	7	7

==== Section 8 ====
First round
(Sweden) Å Svensson	3	7	2
(Spain) G León García	6	6^{0}	6
(Germany) B Rittner	6	6
(United States) M Washington	1	2
(Argentina) M Díaz Oliva	7	6^{5}	6
(Colombia) F Zuluaga	6^{4}	7	4
(Denmark) E Dyrberg	6	6
(Australia) N Pratt	2	3

Second round
14	(South Africa) A Coetzer	6	6
(Spain) G León García	3	4
(Germany) B Rittner	6^{4}	6	7
21	(Spain) Á Montolio	7	2	6^{4}
27	(Slovakia) H Nagyová	3	3
(Argentina) M Díaz Oliva	6	6
(Denmark) E Dyrberg	6	2	1
2	(United States) V Williams	4	6	6

Third round
14	(South Africa) A Coetzer	2	6	7
(Germany) B Rittner	6	3	5
(Argentina) M Díaz Oliva	2	0	r
2	(United States) V Williams	6	1

Fourth round
14	(South Africa) A Coetzer	2	0
2	(United States) V Williams	6	6

== Qualifying ==
=== Qualifying seeds ===
1. (Russia) Alina Jidkova (first round)
2. (Croatia) Silvija Talaja (qualifying competition, Lucky loser)
3. (France) Céline Beigbeder (qualifying competition)
4. (Netherlands) Miriam Oremans (qualifying competition, Lucky loser)
5. (Hungary) Zsófia Gubacsi (qualifying competition)
6. (Denmark) Eva Dyrberg (qualified)
7. (Czech Republic) Květa Hrdličková (qualified)
8. (France) Virginie Razzano (first round)
9. (Germany) Gréta Arn (qualified)
10. (Kazakhstan) Irina Selyutina (qualifying competition)
11. (Argentina) María Emilia Salerni (first round)
12. (Canada) Jana Nejedly (first round)
13. (France) Émilie Loit (qualifying competition)
14. (Indonesia) Wynne Prakusya (qualified)
15. (Japan) Saori Obata (first round)
16. (United States) Jill Craybas (qualifying competition)
17. (Chinese Taipei) Janet Lee (qualified)
18. (Tunisia) Selima Sfar (qualified)
19. (Bulgaria) Lubomira Bacheva (first round)
20. (France) Stéphanie Foretz (qualified)
21. (United States) Mashona Washington (qualified)
22. (Hungary) Anikó Kapros (first round)
23. (Australia) Evie Dominikovic (qualified)
24. (Belgium) Els Callens (first round)

=== Qualifiers ===
1. (Ukraine) Tatiana Perebiynis
2. (Australia) Evie Dominikovic
3. (France) Stéphanie Foretz
4. (Tunisia) Selima Sfar
5. (United States) Mashona Washington
6. (Denmark) Eva Dyrberg
7. (Czech Republic) Květa Hrdličková
8. (Indonesia) Wynne Prakusya
9. (Germany) Gréta Arn
10. (Russia) Vera Zvonareva
11. (Canada) Vanessa Webb
12. (Chinese Taipei) Janet Lee

=== Lucky losers ===
1. (Croatia) Silvija Talaja
2. (Netherlands) Miriam Oremans

=== Qualifying draw ===
==== First qualifier ====
First round				Qualifying competition
1	(Russia) Alina Jidkova	5	3
	(Canada) Maureen Drake	7	6	(Canada) Maureen Drake	6	4	3
	(Ukraine) Tatiana Perebiynis	6	6	(Ukraine) Tatiana Perebiynis	2	6	6
19	(Bulgaria) Lubomira Bacheva	3	2

==== Second qualifier ====
First round					Qualifying competition
2	(Croatia) Silvija Talaja	6	6
	(Switzerland) Miroslava Vavrinec	1	2		2	(Croatia) Silvija Talaja	4	3
	(Canada) Marie-Ève Pelletier	4	6	2	23	(Australia) Evie Dominikovic	6	6
23	(Australia) Evie Dominikovic	6	4	6

==== Third qualifier ====
First round					Qualifying competition
3	(France) Céline Beigbeder	6	6^{2}	6
WC	(United States) Ansley Cargill	3	7^{7}	1	3	(France) Céline Beigbeder	6	1	3
	(Netherlands) Kristie Boogert	5	2		20	(France) Stéphanie Foretz	4	6	6
20	(France) Stéphanie Foretz	7	6

==== Fourth qualifier ====
First round				Qualifying competition
4	(Netherlands) Miriam Oremans	6	6
	(Croatia) Maja Palaveršić	3	2	4	(Netherlands) Miriam Oremans	6^{4}	7^{7}	4
WC	(United States) Shenay Perry	1	0	18	(Tunisia) Selima Sfar	7^{7}	6^{3}	6
18	(Tunisia) Selima Sfar	6	6

==== Fifth qualifier ====
First round				Qualifying competition
5	(Hungary) Zsófia Gubacsi	6	6
	(Czech Republic) Klára Koukalová	3	3	5	(Hungary) Zsófia Gubacsi	3	2
	(Czech Republic) Sandra Kleinová	5	5	21	(United States) Mashona Washington	6	6
21	(United States) Mashona Washington	7	7

==== Sixth qualifier ====
First round					Qualifying competition
6	(Denmark) Eva Dyrberg	6	6
	(Germany) Andrea Glass	2	4		6	(Denmark) Eva Dyrberg	4	7^{9}	6
	(Argentina) Clarisa Fernández	7	3	6		(Argentina) Clarisa Fernández	6	6^{7}	4
15	(Japan) Saori Obata	5	6	3

==== Seventh qualifier ====
First round					Qualifying competition
7	(Czech Republic) Květa Hrdličková	6	6^{3}	6
WC	(United States) Melissa Middleton	2	7^{7}	4	7	(Czech Republic) Květa Hrdličková	7	6
	(Russia) Evgenia Kulikovskaya	3	6	6		(Russia) Evgenia Kulikovskaya	5	4
22	(Hungary) Anikó Kapros	6	1	2

==== Eighth qualifier ====
First round					Qualifying competition
8	(France) Virginie Razzano	1	0
	(Ukraine) Julia Vakulenko	6	6			(Ukraine) Julia Vakulenko	3	6	1
	(Czech Republic) Lenka Němečková	6^{5}	7	3	14	(Indonesia) Wynne Prakusya	6	2	6
14	(Indonesia) Wynne Prakusya	7^{7}	5	6

==== Ninth qualifier ====
First round					Qualifying competition
9	(Germany) Gréta Arn	6	3	6
	(United States) Erika deLone	4	6	2	9	(Germany) Gréta Arn	6	4	6
WC	(United States) Amber Liu	2	2		13	(France) Émilie Loit	1	6	3
13	(France) Émilie Loit	6	6

==== Tenth qualifier ====
First round				Qualifying competition
10	(Kazakhstan) Irina Selyutina	7^{8}	6
	(Colombia) Catalina Castaño	6^{6}	0	10	(Kazakhstan) Irina Selyutina	0	4
WC	(Russia) Vera Zvonareva	6	7	WC	(Russia) Vera Zvonareva	6	6
24	(Belgium) Els Callens	4	5

==== Eleventh qualifier ====
First round				Qualifying competition
11	(Argentina) María Emilia Salerni	4	1
	(Canada) Vanessa Webb	6	6		(Canada) Vanessa Webb	2	6	6
WC	(United States) Ally Baker	3	4	16	(United States) Jill Craybas	6	3	4
16	(United States) Jill Craybas	6	6

==== Twelfth qualifier ====
First round					Qualifying competition
12	(Canada) Jana Nejedly	2	6	2
	(Italy) Antonella Serra Zanetti	6	2	6		(Italy) Antonella Serra Zanetti	1	2
	(Australia) Cindy Watson	6^{6}	6	3	17	(Chinese Taipei) Janet Lee	6	6
17	(Chinese Taipei) Janet Lee	7^{8}	4	6
