= 2001 Sanex Trophy – Doubles =

Doubles
- 2001 Sanex Trophy

Final
- Champions: (Spain) Virginia Ruano Pascual (Spain) Magüi Serna
- Runners-up: (Romania) Ruxandra Dragomir Ilie (Romania) Andreea Ehritt-Vanc
- Score: 6–4, 6–3

Details
- Draw: 16 (1WC/1Q/1LL)
- Seeds: 4

Events
Singles	Doubles
- WTA Knokke-Heist

Giulia Casoni and Iroda Tulyaganova were the defending champions, but none competed this year. Tulyaganova chose to focus on the singles tournament, winning the title.

Virginia Ruano Pascual and Magüi Serna won the title by defeating Ruxandra Dragomir Ilie and Andreea Ehritt-Vanc 6–4, 6–3 in the final.

== Seeds ==
1. (Spain) Virginia Ruano Pascual / (Spain) Magüi Serna (champions)
2. (Federal Republic of Yugoslavia) Jelena Dokic / (Italy) Silvia Farina Elia (semifinals)
3. (Spain) María José Martínez Sánchez / (Spain) Anabel Medina Garrigues (first round)
4. (Bulgaria) ~~Lubomira Bacheva~~ / (Spain) ~~Cristina Torrens Valero~~ (withdrew)

== Draw ==
Key

- Q = Qualifier
- WC = Wild card
- LL = Lucky loser
- Alt = Alternate
- ITF = ITF entry
- PR = Protected ranking
- SR = Special ranking
- SE = Special exempt
- JE = Junior exempt
- JR = Junior Accelerator Programme entrant
- CO = College Accelerator Programme entrant
- NG = Next Gen Accelerator Program entrant
- w/o = Walkover
- r = Retired
- d = Defaulted

=== Draw ===
First round
1	(Spain) V Ruano Pascual (Spain) M Serna	6	6
(Paraguay) R de los Ríos (Argentina) M Díaz Oliva	1	4
(South Africa) N Grandin (Netherlands) A Hopmans	6	4	6
Q	(Germany) Ad Barna (Germany) M Müller	2	6	3
LL	(Belgium) P Van Acker (Netherlands) A van den Hurk	2	5
WC	(Spain) M Marrero (Spain) G Riera	6	7
(Germany) M Buric (Germany) K Freye	3	1
(Brazil) J Cortez (Spain) M Ramon Climent	6	6
(South Africa) J Kruger (Belarus) T Poutchek	6	6
(United Kingdom) H Crook (United Kingdom) V Davies	0	1
(Romania) R Dragomir Ilie (Romania) A Vanc	6	5	6
3	(Spain) MJ Martínez Sánchez (Spain) A Medina Garrigues	3	7	1
(New Zealand) L Baker (India) M Malhotra	2	6	4
(Russia) E Kozhokina (Australia) C Wheeler	6	3	6
(Greece) E Daniilidou (France) C Dhenin	5	2
2	(Federal Republic of Yugoslavia) J Dokic (Italy) S Farina Elia	7	6

Quarterfinals
1	(Spain) V Ruano Pascual (Spain) M Serna	6	6
(South Africa) N Grandin (Netherlands) A Hopmans	1	2
WC	(Spain) M Marrero (Spain) G Riera	7	7^{9}
(Brazil) J Cortez (Spain) M Ramon Climent	5	6^{7}
(South Africa) J Kruger (Belarus) T Poutchek	3	6	1
(Romania) R Dragomir Ilie (Romania) A Vanc	6	4	6
(Russia) E Kozhokina (Australia) C Wheeler	3	4
2	(Federal Republic of Yugoslavia) J Dokic (Italy) S Farina Elia	6	6

Semifinals
1	(Spain) V Ruano Pascual (Spain) M Serna	6	7^{7}
WC	(Spain) M Marrero (Spain) G Riera	0	6^{4}
(Romania) R Dragomir Ilie (Romania) A Vanc	7	6
2	(Federal Republic of Yugoslavia) J Dokic (Italy) S Farina Elia	5	1

Final
1	(Spain) V Ruano Pascual (Spain) M Serna	6	6
(Romania) R Dragomir Ilie (Romania) A Vanc	4	3
