= 2001 Ericsson Open – Women's singles =

Women's singles
- 2001 Ericsson Open

Final
- Champion: (United States) Venus Williams
- Runner-up: (United States) Jennifer Capriati
- Score: 4–6, 6–1, 7–6^{(7–4)}

Details
- Draw: 96
- Seeds: 32

Events
Singles	men	women
Doubles	men	women
← 2000 ·	Ericsson Open	· 2002 →

Venus Williams defeated Jennifer Capriati in the final, 4–6, 6–1, 7–6^{(7–4)} to win the women's singles tennis title at the 2001 Miami Open. Williams saved eight championship points in the third set.

Martina Hingis was the defending champion, but lost in the semifinals to Venus Williams.

== Seeds ==
A champion seed is indicated in bold text while text in italics indicates the round in which that seed was eliminated. All thirty-two seeds received a bye to the second round.

1. (Switzerland) Martina Hingis (semifinals)
2. (United States) Lindsay Davenport (quarterfinals)
3. (United States) **Venus Williams (champion)**
4. (United States) Jennifer Capriati (final)
5. (United States) Serena Williams (quarterfinals)
6. (South Africa) Amanda Coetzer (fourth round)
7. (Russia) Elena Dementieva (semifinals)
8. (France) Nathalie Tauziat (fourth round)
9. (Spain) Arantxa Sánchez Vicario (fourth round)
10. (Germany) Anke Huber (quarterfinals)
11. (Belgium) Kim Clijsters (fourth round)
12. (Bulgaria) Magdalena Maleeva (second round)
13. (France) Sandrine Testud (fourth round)
14. (Belgium) Justine Henin (third round)
15. (United States) Amy Frazier (third round)
16. (Austria) Barbara Schett (second round)
17. (United States) Meghann Shaughnessy (second round)
18. (United States) Lisa Raymond (third round)
19. (Thailand) Tamarine Tanasugarn (fourth round)
20. (Spain) Magüi Serna (fourth round)
21. (Federal Republic of Yugoslavia) Jelena Dokić (quarterfinals)
22. (Russia) Elena Likhovtseva (second round)
23. (Spain) Gala León García (third round)
24. (Luxembourg) Anne Kremer (third round)
25. (Slovakia) Henrieta Nagyová (third round)
26. (France) Anne-Gaëlle Sidot (second round)
27. (Switzerland) Patty Schnyder (second round)
28. (France) Nathalie Dechy (second round)
29. (Russia) Tatiana Panova (third round)
30. (United States) Kristina Brandi (second round)
31. (Zimbabwe) Cara Black (second round)
32. (Croatia) Silvija Talaja (third round)

== Draw ==
=== Key ===
- Q = Qualifier
- WC = Wild card
- LL = Lucky loser
- Alt = Alternate
- SE = Special exempt
- PR = Protected ranking
- ITF = ITF entry
- JE = Junior exempt
- w/o = Walkover
- r = Retired
- d = Defaulted
- SR = Special ranking

=== Finals ===
Quarterfinals
1	(Switzerland) Martina Hingis	7	6
10	(Germany) Anke Huber	5	0
3	(United States) Venus Williams	6	6
21	(Federal Republic of Yugoslavia) Jelena Dokić	2	3
5	(United States) Serena Williams	1	6^{5}
4	(United States) Jennifer Capriati	6	7^{7}
7	(Russia) Elena Dementieva	6	1
2	(United States) Lindsay Davenport	3	0^{r}

Semifinals
1	(Switzerland) Martina Hingis	3	6^{6}
3	(United States) Venus Williams	6	7^{8}
4	(United States) Jennifer Capriati	6	6
7	(Russia) Elena Dementieva	2	0

Final
3	(United States) Venus Williams	4	6	7^{7}
4	(United States) Jennifer Capriati	6	1	6^{4}

=== Top half ===
==== Section 1 ====
First round
(Italy) R Grande	6	7
(Austria) S Plischke	4	5
(Israel) A Smashnova	5	2
Q	(United States) J Craybas	7	6
Q	(China) J-Q Yi	4	2
(Germany) A Glass	6	6
Q	(Australia) A Molik	2	4
(Spain) Á Montolio	6	6

Second round
1	(Switzerland) M Hingis	6	6
(Italy) R Grande	2	2
Q	(United States) J Craybas	3	5
29	(Russia) T Panova	6	7
20	(Spain) M Serna	6	6
(Germany) A Glass	3	2
(Spain) Á Montolio	6	2	5
15	(United States) A Frazier	2	6	7

Third round
1	(Switzerland) M Hingis	6	6
29	(Russia) T Panova	1	0
20	(Spain) M Serna	6	6
15	(United States) A Frazier	2	1

Fourth round
1	(Switzerland) M Hingis	6	6
20	(Spain) M Serna	3	4

==== Section 2 ====
First round
(Czech Republic) D Chládková	6	6
(Belarus) T Poutchek	2	0
(Germany) M Weingärtner	6	7^{7}
(Russia) N Petrova	1	6^{5}
(South Africa) J Kruger	0	3
Q	(France) S Foretz	6	6
Q	(Ukraine) T Perebiynis	6	2	6
(Russia) A Myskina	3	6	1

Second round
10	(Germany) A Huber	7^{7}	7^{7}
(Czech Republic) D Chládková	6^{5}	6^{2}
(Germany) M Weingärtner	4	7	3
24	(Luxembourg) A Kremer	6	5	6
25	(Slovakia) H Nagyová	3	6	6
Q	(France) S Foretz	6	4	4
Q	(Ukraine) T Perebiynis	2	6^{3}
8	(France) N Tauziat	6	7^{7}

Third round
10	(Germany) A Huber	6	6
24	(Luxembourg) A Kremer	4	3
25	(Slovakia) H Nagyová	2	0^{r}
8	(France) N Tauziat	6	5

Fourth round
10	(Germany) A Huber	2	6	6
8	(France) N Tauziat	6	4	4

==== Section 3 ====
First round
(Netherlands) M Oremans	4	6	6
WC	(United States) A Harkleroad	6	4	3
(United States) M Tu	5	4
Q	(United States) S Cacic	7	6
(United States) B Rippner	0	0
(Italy) T Garbin	6	6
WC	(Russia) E Bovina	6	7^{7}
(Romania) R Dragomir-Ilie	1	6^{5}

Second round
3	(United States) V Williams	6	6
(Netherlands) M Oremans	2	0
Q	(United States) S Cacic	6	6
27	(Switzerland) P Schnyder	2	4
22	(Russia) E Likhovtseva	2	3
(Italy) T Garbin	6	6
WC	(Russia) E Bovina	2	2
14	(Belgium) J Henin	6	6

Third round
3	(United States) V Williams	6	6
Q	(United States) S Cacic	2	2
(Italy) T Garbin	6	6
14	(Belgium) J Henin	3	1

Fourth round
3	(United States) V Williams	7	7^{7}
(Italy) T Garbin	5	6^{2}

==== Section 4 ====
First round
(Italy) F Schiavone	1	2
(Spain) M Marrero	6	6
(Canada) S Jeyaseelan	2	1
(Switzerland) M Vavrinec	6	6
Q	(Spain) M J Martínez	3	4
(Croatia) I Majoli	6	6
(Hungary) R Kuti-Kis	1	5
WC	(United States) M Irvin	6	7

Second round
12	(Bulgaria) M Maleeva	4	3
(Spain) M Marrero	6	6
(Switzerland) M Vavrinec	6	3	4
21	(Federal Republic of Yugoslavia) J Dokić	3	6	6
30	(United States) K Brandi	4	4
(Croatia) I Majoli	6	6
WC	(United States) M Irvin	1	7^{7}	3
6	(South Africa) A Coetzer	6	6^{5}	6

Third round
(Spain) M Marrero	2	1
21	(Federal Republic of Yugoslavia) J Dokić	6	6
(Croatia) I Majoli	3	3
6	(South Africa) A Coetzer	6	6

Fourth round
21	(Federal Republic of Yugoslavia) J Dokić	6	7
6	(South Africa) A Coetzer	3	5

=== Bottom half ===
==== Section 5 ====
First round
(Bulgaria) P Nola	7	6
(France) S Pitkowski	5	0
(Uzbekistan) I Tulyaganova	6	1
(China) F Li	1	0^{r}
(Slovakia) K Habšudová	6	7^{7}
WC	(Croatia) M Lučić	3	6^{3}
(Spain) V Ruano Pascual	6	6
(Japan) S Asagoe	3	0

Second round
5	(United States) S Williams	6	6
(Bulgaria) P Nola	1	4
(Uzbekistan) I Tulyaganova	7^{14}	6
26	(France) A-G Sidot	6^{12}	3
23	(Spain) G León García	4	6	6
(Slovakia) K Habšudová	6	2	1
(Spain) V Ruano Pascual	2	6	5
11	(Belgium) K Clijsters	6	2	7

Third round
5	(United States) S Williams	3	6	6
(Uzbekistan) I Tulyaganova	6	3	2
23	(Spain) G León García	3	1
11	(Belgium) K Clijsters	6	6

Fourth round
5	(United States) S Williams	6	6
11	(Belgium) K Clijsters	0	2

==== Section 6 ====
First round
(Czech Republic) K Hrdličková	6	2	6
(Germany) J Kandarr	2	6	3
Q	(France) V Razzano	3	2
Q	(Hungary) A Kapros	6	6
Q	(Argentina) M Díaz Oliva	7	3	6
(Sweden) Å Carlsson	5	6	2
(United States) J Hopkins	6	6
WC	(Argentina) G Dulko	3	3

Second round
16	(Austria) B Schett	4	5
(Czech Republic) K Hrdličková	6	7
Q	(Hungary) A Kapros	6^{4}	1
19	(Thailand) T Tanasugarn	7^{7}	6
31	(Zimbabwe) C Black	6^{4}	6^{6}
Q	(Argentina) M Díaz Oliva	7^{7}	7^{8}
(United States) J Hopkins	4	0
4	(United States) J Capriati	6	6

Third round
(Czech Republic) K Hrdličková	2	6	4
19	(Thailand) T Tanasugarn	6	4	6
Q	(Argentina) M Díaz Oliva	1	1
4	(United States) J Capriati	6	6

Fourth round
19	(Thailand) T Tanasugarn	4	0
4	(United States) J Capriati	6	6

==== Section 7 ====
First round
(South Africa) M de Swardt	6^{4}	4
WC	(United States) A Stevenson	7^{7}	6
WC	(Slovakia) D Hantuchová	6	6^{7}	4
(Canada) J Nejedly	1	7^{9}	6
Q	(Croatia) M Palaveršić	3	2
(Australia) N Pratt	6	6
(Slovenia) T Pisnik	7^{7}	3	0
(Germany) B Rittner	6^{3}	6	6

Second round
7	(Russia) E Dementieva	6	2
WC	(United States) A Stevenson	2	0^{r}
(Canada) J Nejedly	3	4
32	(Croatia) S Talaja	6	6
17	(United States) M Shaughnessy	2	6	2
(Australia) N Pratt	6	2	6
(Germany) B Rittner	2	6	0
9	(Spain) A Sánchez Vicario	6	2	6

Third round
7	(Russia) E Dementieva	6	6
32	(Croatia) S Talaja	4	2
(Australia) N Pratt	0	6^{4}
9	(Spain) A Sánchez Vicario	6	7^{7}

Fourth round
7	(Russia) E Dementieva	6	6
9	(Spain) A Sánchez Vicario	1	2

==== Section 8 ====
First round
WC	(United States) M Washington	7	6
(Czech Republic) A Gerši	5	1
(Japan) A Sugiyama	7^{7}	6
Q	(Russia) L Krasnoroutskaya	6^{3}	0
(France) É Loit	6^{3}	2
(United States) L Osterloh	7^{7}	6
(Paraguay) R de los Ríos	4	4
(Czech Republic) D Bedáňová	6	6

Second round
13	(France) S Testud	6	6
WC	(United States) M Washington	1	3
(Japan) A Sugiyama	1	1^{r}
18	(United States) L Raymond	6	4
28	(France) N Dechy	2	6^{5}
(United States) L Osterloh	6	7^{7}
(Czech Republic) D Bedáňová	1	1^{r}
2	(United States) L Davenport	6	4

Third round
13	(France) S Testud	6	5	6
18	(United States) L Raymond	3	7	4
(United States) L Osterloh	2	0
2	(United States) L Davenport	6	6

Fourth round
13	(France) S Testud	3	1
2	(United States) L Davenport	6	6

== Qualifying ==
=== Seeds ===
1. (Australia) Rachel McQuillan (first round)
2. (Russia) Lina Krasnoroutskaya (champion)
3. (Argentina) Mariana Díaz Oliva (qualified)
4. (Australia) Evie Dominikovic (qualifying competition)
5. (United States) Dawn Buth (first round)
6. (Bulgaria) Lubomira Bacheva (qualifying competition)
7. (Czech Republic) Sandra Kleinová (first round)
8. (Russia) Alina Jidkova (qualifying competition)
9. (Netherlands) Kristie Boogert (first round)
10. (Slovakia) Janette Husárová (first round)
11. (Venezuela) María Vento (qualifying competition)
12. (Colombia) Catalina Castaño (first round)
13. (United States) Allison Bradshaw (first round)
14. (United States) Sandra Cacic (qualified)
15. (Tunisia) Selima Sfar (first round)
16. (Netherlands) Amanda Hopmans (first round)
17. (Slovakia) Ľudmila Cervanová (first round)
18. (United States) Jill Craybas (qualified)
19. (France) Virginie Razzano (qualified)
20. (Slovakia) Martina Suchá (first round)
21. (Germany) Bianka Lamade (qualifying competition)
22. (Belarus) Olga Barabanschikova (first round)
23. (Spain) María José Martínez Sánchez (qualified)
24. (Federal Republic of Yugoslavia) Sandra Načuk (first round)

=== Qualifiers ===
1. (Hungary) Anikó Kapros
2. (Russia) Lina Krasnoroutskaya
3. (Argentina) Mariana Díaz Oliva
4. (Spain) María José Martínez Sánchez
5. (France) Stéphanie Foretz
6. (Ukraine) Tatiana Perebiynis
7. (Australia) Alicia Molik
8. (Croatia) Maja Palaveršić
9. (France) Virginie Razzano
10. (China) Yi Jing-Qian
11. (United States) Jill Craybas
12. (United States) Sandra Cacic

=== Qualifying draw ===
==== First qualifier ====
First round					Qualifying competition
1	(Australia) Rachel McQuillan	3	0
WC	(Hungary) Anikó Kapros	6	6		WC	(Hungary) Anikó Kapros	6	6
	(Venezuela) Milagros Sequera	6	6^{3}	6		(Venezuela) Milagros Sequera	2	1
16	(Netherlands) Amanda Hopmans	1	7^{7}	1

==== Second qualifier ====
First round					Qualifying competition
2	(Russia) Lina Krasnoroutskaya	6	6
	(Indonesia) Wynne Prakusya	4	1		2	(Russia) Lina Krasnoroutskaya	6	6
WC	(United States) Sunitha Rao	3	6	6	WC	(United States) Sunitha Rao	1	2
13	(United States) Allison Bradshaw	6	0	3

==== Third qualifier ====
First round				Qualifying competition
3	(Argentina) Mariana Díaz Oliva	7	6
	(Hungary) Katalin Marosi-Aracama	5	1	3	(Argentina) Mariana Díaz Oliva	6	6
	(Germany) Gréta Arn	6	6		(Germany) Gréta Arn	2	3
22	(Belarus) Olga Barabanschikova	3	3

==== Fourth qualifier ====
First round					Qualifying competition
4	(Australia) Evie Dominikovic	6	3	6
	(Belgium) Laurence Courtois	3	6	3	4	(Australia) Evie Dominikovic	6	2	3
WC	(Federal Republic of Yugoslavia) Jelena Janković	1	0^{r}		23	(Spain) María José Martínez Sánchez	1	6	6
23	(Spain) María José Martínez Sánchez	6	4

==== Fifth qualifier ====
First round					Qualifying competition
5	(United States) Dawn Buth	6	1	3
	(United States) Erika deLone	3	6	6	(United States) Erika deLone	6	2	3
	(France) Stéphanie Foretz	6	6		(France) Stéphanie Foretz	4	6	6
24	(Federal Republic of Yugoslavia) Sandra Načuk	4	0

==== Sixth qualifier ====
First round					Qualifying competition
6	(Bulgaria) Lubomira Bacheva	6	2	6
	(Chinese Taipei) Janet Lee	3	6	2	6	(Bulgaria) Lubomira Bacheva	5	5
WC	(Ukraine) Tatiana Perebiynis	6	6		WC	(Ukraine) Tatiana Perebiynis	7	7
15	(Tunisia) Selima Sfar	1	2

==== Seventh qualifier ====
First round				Qualifying competition
7	(Czech Republic) Sandra Kleinová	5	1
	(Slovenia) Katarina Srebotnik	7	6	(Slovenia) Katarina Srebotnik	6^{2}	6	2
	(Australia) Alicia Molik	6	6	(Australia) Alicia Molik	7^{7}	1	6
17	(Slovakia) Ľudmila Cervanová	0	1

==== Eighth qualifier ====
First round					Qualifying competition
8	(Russia) Alina Jidkova	3	1
	(United States) Tara Snyder	6	1^{r}		8	(Russia) Alina Jidkova	2	7	6^{4}
Alt	(Croatia) Maja Palaveršić	4	6	7	Alt	(Croatia) Maja Palaveršić	6	5	7^{7}
20	(Slovakia) Martina Suchá	6	2	5

==== Ninth qualifier ====
First round					Qualifying competition
9	(Netherlands) Kristie Boogert	6	4	3
	(Belgium) Els Callens	2	6	6		(Belgium) Els Callens	5	4
	(Japan) Yuka Yoshida	4	2		19	(France) Virginie Razzano	7	6
19	(France) Virginie Razzano	6	6

==== Tenth qualifier ====
First round					Qualifying competition
10	(Slovakia) Janette Husárová	6	4	4
	(China) Yi Jing-Qian	4	6	6		(China) Yi Jing-Qian	6	7^{7}
	(Japan) Saori Obata	6	6^{5}	3^{r}	21	(Germany) Bianka Lamade	2	6^{3}
21	(Germany) Bianka Lamade	3	7^{7}	2

==== Eleventh qualifier ====
First round				Qualifying competition
11	(Venezuela) María Vento	6	7
WC	(Russia) Vera Zvonareva	2	5	11	(Venezuela) María Vento	1	4
	(Germany) Anca Barna	3	2	18	(United States) Jill Craybas	6	6
18	(United States) Jill Craybas	6	6

==== Twelfth qualifier ====
First round				Qualifying competition
12	(Colombia) Catalina Castaño	4	6^{3}
WC	(United States) Bethanie Mattek	6	7^{7}	WC	(United States) Bethanie Mattek	5	4
	(Spain) Lourdes Domínguez Lino	5	0	14	(United States) Sandra Cacic	7	6
14	(United States) Sandra Cacic	7	6
