= 2001 Sanex Trophy – Singles =

Singles
- 2001 Sanex Trophy

Final
- Champion: (Uzbekistan) Iroda Tulyaganova
- Runner-up: (Spain) Gala León García
- Score: 6–2, 6–3

Details
- Draw: 32 (2WC/4Q)
- Seeds: 8

Events
Singles	Doubles
← 2000 ·	WTA Knokke-Heist	· 2002 →

Anna Smashnova was the defending champion, but did not compete this year.

Iroda Tulyaganova won the title by defeating Gala León García 6–2, 6–3 in the final.

== Seeds ==
1. (Belgium) Kim Clijsters (semifinals)
2. (Italy) Silvia Farina Elia (second round)
3. (Federal Republic of Yugoslavia) Jelena Dokic (first round)
4. (Spain) Ángeles Montolio (quarterfinals)
5. (Spain) Magüi Serna (quarterfinals)
6. (Switzerland) Patty Schnyder (first round, retired)
7. (Italy) Francesca Schiavone (first round)
8. (Argentina) Mariana Díaz Oliva (first round)

== Draw ==
=== Key ===
- Q = Qualifier
- WC = Wild card
- LL = Lucky loser
- Alt = Alternate
- SE = Special exempt
- PR = Protected ranking
- ITF = ITF entry
- JE = Junior exempt
- w/o = Walkover
- r = Retired
- d = Defaulted
- SR = Special ranking

=== Finals ===
Semifinals
1	(Belgium) Kim Clijsters	0	4
(Uzbekistan) Iroda Tulyaganova	6	6
(Spain) Marta Marrero	3	3
(Spain) Gala León García	6	6

Final
(Uzbekistan) Iroda Tulyaganova	6	6
(Spain) Gala León García	2	3

=== Top half ===
First round
1	(Belgium) K Clijsters	6	6
(Slovakia) Ľ Cervanová	3	4
Q	(Ukraine) J Vakulenko	6	3	6^{1}
(Spain) V Ruano Pascual	1	6	7^{7}
(Austria) B Schwartz	4	7^{7}	6
WC	(Belgium) E Callens	6	6^{2}	2
(Bulgaria) L Bacheva	4	4
5	(Spain) M Serna	6	6
4	(Spain) Á Montolio	6	6
(Czech Republic) S Kleinová	3	2
(Belarus) T Poutchek	2	4
Q	(Germany) M Müller	6	6
(Uzbekistan) T Tulyaganova	6	7^{7}
WC	(Greece) E Daniilidou	3	6^{4}
(Spain) MJ Martínez Sánchez	1	6
6	(Switzerland) P Schnyder	6	4	r

Second round
1	(Belgium) K Clijsters	6	6
(Spain) V Ruano Pascual	2	3
(Austria) B Schwartz
5	(Spain) M Serna	w/o
4	(Spain) Á Montolio	6	6
Q	(Germany) M Müller	4	2
(Uzbekistan) T Tulyaganova	6	6
(Spain) MJ Martínez Sánchez	1	4

Quarterfinals
1	(Belgium) K Clijsters	6	4	6
5	(Spain) M Serna	1	6	3
4	(Spain) Á Montolio	2	4
(Uzbekistan) T Tulyaganova	6	6

Semifinals
1	(Belgium) K Clijsters	0	4
(Uzbekistan) T Tulyaganova	6	6

=== Bottom half ===
First round
8	(Argentina) M Díaz Oliva	2	0
(Spain) C Torrens Valero	6	6
(South Africa) J Kruger	2	0
(Spain) A Medina Garrigues	6	6
(Spain) M Marrero	6	6
(Germany) M Schnitzer	1	4
(Czech Republic) D Chládková	6	6
3	(Federal Republic of Yugoslavia) J Dokic	4	2
7	(Italy) F Schiavone	4	3
(Netherlands) A Hopmans	6	6
(Spain) G León García	7	6
(Romania) R Dragomir	5	2
Q	(France) C Dhenin	3	3
(Paraguay) R de los Ríos	6	6
Q	(Australia) J Hewitt	4	2
2	(Italy) S Farina Elia	6	6

Second round
(Spain) C Torrens Valero	6	6
(Spain) A Medina Garrigues	2	3
(Spain) M Marrero	6	6
(Czech Republic) D Chládková	1	3
(Netherlands) A Hopmans	4	2
(Spain) G León García	6	6
(Paraguay) R de los Ríos	6	6
2	(Italy) S Farina Elia	3	1

Quarterfinals
(Spain) C Torrens Valero	3	1
(Spain) M Marrero	6	6
(Spain) G León García	6	6
(Paraguay) R de los Ríos	3	3

Semifinals
(Spain) M Marrero	3	3
(Spain) G León García	6	6
