= 2001 Sanex Trophy =

- Date: 16–22 July
- Edition: 3rd
- Category: Tier IV
- Draw: 32S / 16D
- Prize money: $150,000
- Surface: Clay / outdoor
- Location: Knokke-Heist, Belgium

Champions

Singles
- (Uzbekistan) Iroda Tulyaganova

Doubles
- (Spain) Virginia Ruano Pascual (Spain) Magüi Serna
← 2000 ·	WTA Knokke-Heist	· 2002 →

The 2001 Sanex Trophy was a women's tennis tournament played on outdoor clay courts in Knokke-Heist, Belgium that was part of the Tier IV category of the 2001 WTA Tour. It was the third and last edition of the tournament and was held from 16 July until 22 July 2001. Unseeded Iroda Tulyaganova won the singles title and earned $23,500 first-prize money.

== Finals ==
=== Singles ===
(Uzbekistan) Iroda Tulyaganova defeated (Spain) Gala León García, 6–2, 6–3

- It was Tulyaganova's 2nd singles title of the year and the 3rd of her career.

=== Doubles ===
(Spain) Virginia Ruano Pascual / (Spain) Magüi Serna defeated (Romania) Ruxandra Dragomir Ilie / (Romania) Andreea Ehritt-Vanc, 6–4, 6–3
