= 2002 Australian Open – Women's doubles =

Women's doubles
- 2002 Australian Open

Final
- Champions: (Switzerland) Martina Hingis (Russia) Anna Kournikova
- Runners-up: (Slovakia) Daniela Hantuchová (Spain) Arantxa Sánchez Vicario
- Score: 6–2, 6–7^{(4–7)}, 6–1

Details
- Draw: 64
- Seeds: 16

Events
Singles	men	women		boys	girls
Doubles	men	women	mixed	boys	girls
WC Singles	men	women	quad
WC Doubles	men	women	quad
Legends	men	women	mixed
- Australian Open

Martina Hingis and Anna Kournikova defeated Daniela Hantuchová and Arantxa Sánchez Vicario in the final, 6–2, 6–7^{(4–7)}, 6–1 to win the women's doubles tennis title at the 2002 Australian Open. It was the pair's second Australian Open doubles title, after 1999.

Serena Williams and Venus Williams were the reigning champions, but Serena withdrew due to injury, and Venus did not participate.

== Seeds ==
1. (United States) Lisa Raymond / (Australia) Rennae Stubbs (semifinals)
2. (Zimbabwe) Cara Black / (Russia) Elena Likhovtseva (first round)
3. (Spain) Virginia Ruano Pascual / (Argentina) Paola Suárez (third round)
4. (Belgium) Kim Clijsters / (Japan) Ai Sugiyama (third round)
5. (United States) Nicole Arendt / (South Africa) Liezel Huber (third round)
6. (France) Sandrine Testud / (Italy) Roberta Vinci (third round)
7. (Belgium) Els Callens / (Australia) Nicole Pratt (third round)
8. (Switzerland) Martina Hingis / (Russia) Anna Kournikova (champions)
9. (Slovenia) Tina Križan / (Slovenia) Katarina Srebotnik (quarterfinals)
10. (South Africa) Amanda Coetzer / (United States) Lori McNeil (quarterfinals)
11. (Retired)
12. (Italy) Silvia Farina Elia / (Austria) Barbara Schett (second round)
13. (Slovakia) Daniela Hantuchová / (Spain) Arantxa Sánchez Vicario (final)
14. (Spain) María José Martínez Sánchez / (Spain) Anabel Medina Garrigues (second round)
15. (Spain) Conchita Martínez / (Spain) Magüi Serna (semifinals)
16. (Chinese Taipei) Janet Lee / (Indonesia) Wynne Prakusya (second round)
17. (France) Alexandra Fusai / (Netherlands) Caroline Vis (second round)

== Draw ==
Key

- Q = Qualifier
- WC = Wild card
- LL = Lucky loser
- Alt = Alternate
- ITF = ITF entry
- PR = Protected ranking
- SR = Special ranking
- SE = Special exempt
- JE = Junior exempt
- JR = Junior Accelerator Programme entrant
- CO = College Accelerator Programme entrant
- NG = Next Gen Accelerator Program entrant
- w/o = Walkover
- r = Retired
- d = Defaulted

=== Finals ===
Quarterfinals
1	(United States) Lisa Raymond (Australia) Rennae Stubbs	7^{10}	6
(Czech Republic) Dája Bedáňová (Czech Republic) Květa Hrdličková	6^{8}	4
(Japan) Shinobu Asagoe (Japan) Rika Fujiwara	4	2
8	(Switzerland) Martina Hingis (Russia) Anna Kournikova	6	6
9	(Slovenia) Tina Križan (Slovenia) Katarina Srebotnik	6^{3}	1
13	(Slovakia) Daniela Hantuchová (Spain) Arantxa Sánchez Vicario	7^{7}	6
10	(South Africa) Amanda Coetzer (United States) Lori McNeil	0	2
15	(Spain) Conchita Martínez (Spain) Magüi Serna	6	6

Semifinals
1	(United States) Lisa Raymond (Australia) Rennae Stubbs	7^{7}	1	0
8	(Switzerland) Martina Hingis (Russia) Anna Kournikova	6^{5}	6	6
13	(Slovakia) Daniela Hantuchová (Spain) Arantxa Sánchez Vicario	7	6
15	(Spain) Conchita Martínez (Spain) Magüi Serna	5	2

Final
8	(Switzerland) Martina Hingis (Russia) Anna Kournikova	6	6^{4}	6
13	(Slovakia) Daniela Hantuchová (Spain) Arantxa Sánchez Vicario	2	7^{7}	1

=== Top half ===
==== Section 1 ====
First round
1	(United States) L Raymond (Australia) R Stubbs	6	6
(Denmark) E Dyrberg (Czech Republic) E Martincová	2	2
(South Africa) J Kruger (Germany) M Weingärtner	3	3
(Russia) G Fokina (Belarus) N Ostrovskaya	6	6
(Slovakia) K Habšudová (Paraguay) R de los Ríos	3	6	3
(Greece) E Daniilidou (Australia) A Molik	6	3	6
(Australia) R McQuillan (Australia) L McShea	4	4
14	(Spain) MJ Martínez Sánchez (Spain) A Medina Garrigues	6	6
12	(Italy) S Farina Elia (Austria) B Schett	7	6
(Australia) E Dominikovic (United States) M Irvin	5	4
(Czech Republic) D Bedáňová (Czech Republic) K Hrdličková	6	6
(Russia) A Rodionova (Germany) C Schneider	1	3
(United States) S Reeves (Italy) Ad Serra Zanetti	5	3
(Argentina) ME Salerni (Argentina) P Tarabini	7	6
(United States) K Schlukebir (Ukraine) E Tatarkova	6^{3}	6	2
7	(Belgium) E Callens (Australia) N Pratt	7^{7}	3	6

Second round
1	(United States) L Raymond (Australia) R Stubbs	6	6
(Russia) G Fokina (Belarus) N Ostrovskaya	3	1
(Greece) E Daniilidou (Australia) A Molik	w/o
14	(Spain) MJ Martínez Sánchez (Spain) A Medina Garrigues
12	(Italy) S Farina Elia (Austria) B Schett	7^{7}	2	4
(Czech Republic) D Bedáňová (Czech Republic) K Hrdličková	6^{5}	6	6
(Argentina) ME Salerni (Argentina) P Tarabini	7^{8}	4	3
7	(Belgium) E Callens (Australia) N Pratt	6^{6}	6	6

Third round
1	(United States) L Raymond (Australia) R Stubbs	6	7
(Greece) E Daniilidou (Australia) A Molik	2	5
(Czech Republic) D Bedáňová (Czech Republic) K Hrdličková	2	6	6
7	(Belgium) E Callens (Australia) N Pratt	6	2	3

Quarterfinals
1	(United States) L Raymond (Australia) R Stubbs	7^{10}	6
(Czech Republic) D Bedáňová (Czech Republic) K Hrdličková	6^{8}	4

==== Section 2 ====
First round
3	(Spain) V Ruano Pascual (Argentina) P Suárez	6	7^{7}
(United States) A Augustus (United States) J Embry	3	6^{2}
(Australia) T Musgrave (Russia) T Panova	2	4
(Germany) M Müller (Germany) B Rittner	6	6
WC	(Australia) B Stewart (Australia) S Stosur	4	3
(Japan) S Asagoe (Japan) R Fujiwara	6	6
(South Africa) N de Villiers (Kazakhstan) I Selyutina	6	3	3
16	(Chinese Taipei) J Lee (Indonesia) W Prakusya	1	6	6
17	(France) A Fusai (Netherlands) C Vis	6	6
(Japan) H Inoue (New Zealand) S Stephens	1	4
(Germany) A Barna (Slovakia) J Husárová	2	1
(Netherlands) K Boogert (Netherlands) M Oremans	6	6
WC	(Australia) A Grahame (Australia) C Watson	0	4
(Bulgaria) M Maleeva (Sweden) Å Svensson	6	6
(Australia) A Ellwood (Ukraine) T Perebiynis	2	2
8	(Switzerland) M Hingis (Russia) A Kournikova	6	6

Second round
3	(Spain) V Ruano Pascual (Argentina) P Suárez	7^{7}	6
(Germany) M Müller (Germany) B Rittner	6^{2}	3
(Japan) S Asagoe (Japan) R Fujiwara	4	7^{7}	6
16	(Chinese Taipei) J Lee (Indonesia) W Prakusya	6	6^{5}	2
17	(France) A Fusai (Netherlands) C Vis	4	2
(Netherlands) K Boogert (Netherlands) M Oremans	6	6
(Bulgaria) M Maleeva (Sweden) Å Svensson	3	1
8	(Switzerland) M Hingis (Russia) A Kournikova	6	6

Third round
3	(Spain) V Ruano Pascual (Argentina) P Suárez	0	4
(Japan) S Asagoe (Japan) R Fujiwara	6	6
(Netherlands) K Boogert (Netherlands) M Oremans	3	5
8	(Switzerland) M Hingis (Russia) A Kournikova	6	7

Quarterfinals
(Japan) S Asagoe (Japan) R Fujiwara	4	2
8	(Switzerland) M Hingis (Russia) A Kournikova	6	6

=== Bottom half ===
==== Section 3 ====
First round
5	(United States) N Arendt (South Africa) L Huber	6	7
(Hungary) P Mandula (Austria) P Wartusch	4	5
(United States) E deLone (France) V Razzano	7^{7}	1	7
(Slovenia) M Matevžič (Federal Republic of Yugoslavia) D Zarić	6^{3}	6	5
(Bulgaria) L Bacheva (Belarus) T Poutchek	5	0
(Japan) R Hiraki (Japan) M Miyagi	7	6
(Russia) A Jidkova (Romania) A Vanc	4	6	6
9	(Slovenia) T Križan (Slovenia) K Srebotnik	6	3	8
13	(Slovakia) D Hantuchová (Spain) A Sánchez Vicario	6	6
(Russia) A Myskina (Slovenia) T Pisnik	4	4
(Switzerland) E Gagliardi (United States) M Tu	3	6	6
(Germany) B Lamade (Switzerland) P Schnyder	6	3	2
(Argentina) C Fernández (United States) A Frazier	6	6
(Croatia) I Majoli (Italy) F Schiavone	2	3
(Argentina) M Díaz Oliva (Hungary) K Marosi-Aracama	2	1
4	(Belgium) K Clijsters (Japan) A Sugiyama	6	6

Second round
5	(United States) N Arendt (South Africa) L Huber	6	6
(United States) E deLone (France) V Razzano	4	2
(Japan) R Hiraki (Japan) M Miyagi	4	4
9	(Slovenia) T Križan (Slovenia) K Srebotnik	6	6
13	(Slovakia) D Hantuchová (Spain) A Sánchez Vicario	6	6
(Switzerland) E Gagliardi (United States) M Tu	4	2
(Argentina) C Fernández (United States) A Frazier	4	0
4	(Belgium) K Clijsters (Japan) A Sugiyama	6	6

Third round
5	(United States) N Arendt (South Africa) L Huber	3	6^{6}
9	(Slovenia) T Križan (Slovenia) K Srebotnik	6	7^{8}
13	(Slovakia) D Hantuchová (Spain) A Sánchez Vicario	w/o
4	(Belgium) K Clijsters (Japan) A Sugiyama

Quarterfinals
9	(Slovenia) T Križan (Slovenia) K Srebotnik	6^{3}	1
13	(Slovakia) D Hantuchová (Spain) A Sánchez Vicario	7^{7}	6

==== Section 4 ====
First round
6	(France) S Testud (Italy) R Vinci	6	6
(Spain) E Bes (Czech Republic) L Němečková	3	1
(Spain) M Marrero (Spain) C Torrens Valero	3	3
WC	(Australia) C Barclay (Australia) C Wheeler	6	6
(United States) L Osterloh (United Kingdom) J Pullin	3	1
(Italy) T Garbin (Italy) R Grande	6	6
WC	(Australia) J Hewitt (Australia) A Szili	3	4
10	(South Africa) A Coetzer (United States) L McNeil	6	6
15	(Spain) C Martínez (Spain) M Serna	7^{7}	6
(Slovakia) H Nagyová (Uzbekistan) I Tulyaganova	6^{4}	4
(France) N Dechy (France) É Loit	0	6	6
(Brazil) J Cortez (Italy) An Serra Zanetti	6	0	2
(Russia) E Bovina (United States) A Stevenson	7^{7}	3	4
(South Africa) N Grandin (Netherlands) A van Exel	6^{3}	6	6
(South Africa) K Grant (United States) A Spears	6	3	6
2	(Zimbabwe) C Black (Russia) E Likhovtseva	4	6	2

Second round
6	(France) S Testud (Italy) R Vinci	7	6
WC	(Australia) C Barclay (Australia) C Wheeler	5	0
(Italy) T Garbin (Italy) R Grande
10	(South Africa) A Coetzer (United States) L McNeil	w/o
15	(Spain) C Martínez (Spain) M Serna	6	6
(France) N Dechy (France) É Loit	3	4
(South Africa) N Grandin (Netherlands) A van Exel	7^{7}	6
(South Africa) K Grant (United States) A Spears	6^{4}	1

Third round
6	(France) S Testud (Italy) R Vinci	7^{7}	5	2
10	(South Africa) A Coetzer (United States) L McNeil	6^{2}	7	6
15	(Spain) C Martínez (Spain) M Serna	6	6
(South Africa) N Grandin (Netherlands) A van Exel	2	1

Quarterfinals
10	(South Africa) A Coetzer (United States) L McNeil	0	2
15	(Spain) C Martínez (Spain) M Serna	6	6
