= Christina Wheeler =

Australian tennis player

- Country (sports): Australia
- Residence: Melbourne, Australia
- Born: 15 April 1982 (age 42); Korosten, Ukraine
- Height: 1.61 m (5 ft 3 in)
- Turned pro: 2000
- Retired: 2008
- Plays: Right-handed (two-handed backhand)
- Prize money: $357,140

Singles
- Career record: 221–208
- Career titles: 3 ITF
- Highest ranking: 147 (26 May 2003)

Grand Slam singles results
- Australian Open: 1R (2001, 2002, 2008)
- French Open: 2R (2002)
- Wimbledon: 1R (2004)
- US Open: Q3 (2003)

Doubles
- Career record: 193–144
- Career titles: 10 ITF
- Highest ranking: 91 (8 July 2002)

Grand Slam doubles results
- Australian Open: 2R (2002, 2005, 2006)
- French Open: 1R (2002, 2004)
- Wimbledon: 2R (2002, 2004)
- US Open: 2R (2003)

Christina Wheeler (born 15 April 1982) is an Australian retired tennis player.

Her highest WTA singles ranking is 147, which she reached on 26 May 2003. Her career high in doubles is 91, achieved on 8 July 2002. Wheeler won three ITF singles titles and ten ITF doubles titles.

She retired from professional circuit in 2008.

== WTA career finals ==
=== Doubles: 1 (runner-up) ===
Legend
Tier I (0–0)
Tier II (0–0)
Tier III (0–0)
Tier IV & V (0-1)

Result	Date	Tournament	Surface	Partner	Opponents	Score
Loss	Jan 2002	Hobart International, Australia	Hard	(Australia) Catherine Barclay	(Italy) Tathiana Garbin (Italy) Rita Grande	2–6, 6–7^{(7–3)}

== ITF Circuit finals ==
=== Singles: 11 (3–8) ===
Legend $100,000 tournaments $75,000 tournaments $50,000 tournaments $25,000 tournaments $10,000 tournaments	Finals by surface Hard (1–5) Clay (2–3) Grass (0–0) Carpet (0–0)

Result	No.	Date	Tournament	Surface	Opponent	Score
Win	1.	8 May 2000	ITF Swansea, United Kingdom	Clay	(Serbia and Montenegro) Dragana Zarić	6–4, 7–6^{(7–4)}
Loss	2.	13 November 2000	ITF Port Pirie, Australia	Hard	(Australia) Evie Dominikovic	4–6, 4–6
Loss	3.	26 February 2001	ITF Bendigo, Australia	Hard	(Australia) Annabel Ellwood	6–3, 2–6, 4–6
Win	4.	29 October 2001	ITF Mackay, Australia	Hard	(Australia) Cindy Watson	6–3, 6–2
Loss	5.	5 May 2003	ITF Sea Island, United States	Hard	(Russia) Maria Sharapova	4–6, 3–6
Loss	6.	13 May 2003	ITF Charlottesville, United States	Clay	(Puerto Rico) Kristina Brandi	6–4, 4–6, 2–6
Loss	7.	18 February 2007	ITF Melbourne, Australia	Clay	(Australia) Casey Dellacqua	3–6, 1–6
Loss	8.	17 June 2007	ITF Campobasso, Italy	Clay	(Hungary) Kira Nagy	2–6, 0–6
Loss	9.	12 November 2007	ITF Sunderland, England	Hard	(France) Iryna Brémond	1–6, 0–6
Loss	10.	23 March 2008	ITF Sorrento, Italy	Hard	(United Kingdom) Melanie South	5–7, 7–6^{(8–6)}, 4–6
Win	11.	21 April 2008	ITF Naples, Italy	Clay	(Switzerland) Lisa Sabino	6–4, 7–6^{(7–4)}

=== Doubles: 27 (10–17) ===
Legend $100,000 tournaments $75,000 tournaments $50,000 tournaments $25,000 tournaments $10,000 tournaments	Finals by surface Hard (4–9) Clay (4–7) Grass (2–1) Carpet (0–0)

Result	No.	Date	Tournament	Surface	Partner	Opponents	Score
Win	1.	2 April 2000	ITF Corowa, Australia	Grass	(Australia) Cindy Watson	(South Africa) Natalie Grandin (South Africa) Nicole Rencken	6–3, 7–6^{(13–11)}
Loss	2.	19 November 2001	ITF Nuriootpa, Australia	Hard	(Australia) Catherine Barclay	(Australia) Evie Dominikovic (Australia) Samantha Stosur	1–6, 7–6^{(7–5)}, 4–6
Win	3.	6 April 2002	ITF Jackson, United States	Clay	(Australia) Lisa McShea	(Argentina) Gisela Dulko (Venezuela) Milagros Sequera	6–2, 6–4
Win	4.	10 September 2002	Peachtree, United States	Hard	(United States) Jennifer Russell	(United States) Ally Baker (Puerto Rico) Kristina Brandi	6–2, 7–6^{(7–3)}
Loss	5.	24 September 2002	Albuquerque, United States	Hard	(Ukraine) Tatiana Perebiynis	(Italy) Francesca Lubiani (Venezuela) Milagros Sequera	6–1, 5–7, 5–7
Loss	6.	15 October 2002	Sedona, United States	Hard	(Venezuela) Milagros Sequera	(United States) Jennifer Russell (United States) Mashona Washington	6–7^{(3–7)}, 5–7
Loss	7.	15 April 2003	Jackson, United States	Clay	(Australia) Lisa McShea	(United States) Teryn Ashley (United States) Abigail Spears	1–6, 3–6
Win	8.	22 April 2003	Dothan, United States	Clay	(Venezuela) Milagros Sequera	(United States) Julie Ditty (United States) Varvara Lepchenko	5–7, 6–1, 6–2
Loss	9.	5 May 2003	Sea Island, United States	Clay	(Australia) Lisa McShea	(United States) Jennifer Russell (United States) Jessica Lehnhoff	3–6, 4–6
Loss	10.	18 May 2003	Charlottesville, United States	Clay	(United States) Julie Ditty	(United States) Bethanie Mattek-Sands (United States) Lilia Osterloh	5–7, 1–6
Loss	11.	22 July 2003	Lexington, United States	Hard	(Australia) Bryanne Stewart	(Chinese Taipei) Janet Lee (United States) Jessica Lehnhoff	3–6, 4–6
Win	12.	24 November 2003	Mount Gambier, Australia	Hard	(United States) Jessica Lehnhoff	(Australia) Bryanne Stewart (Australia) Samantha Stosur	7–5, 6–2
Win	13.	4 May 2004	Raleigh, United States	Clay	(United States) Ansley Cargill	(Canada) Marie-Ève Pelletier (Netherlands) Anousjka Van Exel	6–4, 6–4
Loss	14.	17 August 2004	Bronx, United States	Hard	(United States) Jessica Lehnhoff	(China) Li Na (China) Liu Nannan	7–5, 3–6, 3–6
Loss	15.	10 May 2005	Charlottesville, United States	Clay	(United States) Samantha Reeves	(United States) Ashley Harkleroad (United States) Lindsay Lee-Waters	4–6, 5–7
Win	16.	10 July 2006	Felixstowe, United Kingdom	Grass	(Australia) Trudi Musgrave	(United Kingdom) Sarah Borwell (United Kingdom) Jane O'Donoghue	6–2, 6–4
Win	17.	13 November 2006	Mount Gambier, Australia	Hard	(South Africa) Natalie Grandin	(Australia) Daniella Jeflea (Australia) Sophie Ferguson	6–4, 4–6, 6–4
Loss	18.	27 November 2006	Nuriootpa, Australia	Hard	(Australia) Trudi Musgrave	(South Africa) Natalie Grandin (United States) Raquel Kops-Jones	2–6, 6–7^{(3–7)}
Loss	19.	16 March 2007	Perth, Australia	Hard	(Australia) Trudi Musgrave	(Australia) Casey Dellacqua (Australia) Emily Hewson	4–6, 6–4, 2–6
Win	20.	23 March 2007	Kalgoorlie, Australia	Hard	(Australia) Emily Hewson	(Indonesia) Vivien Silfany-Tony (Indonesia) Lavinia Tananta	6–4, 6–3
Loss	21.	4 June 2007	Grado, Italy	Clay	(Montenegro) Ana Veselinović	(Italy) Stefania Chieppa (Belarus) Darya Kustova	5–7, 3–6
Loss	22.	11 June 2007	Campobasso, Italy	Clay	(United States) Story Tweedie-Yates	(Argentina) María José Argeri (Brazil) Letícia Sobral	5–7, 3–6
Loss	23.	5 November 2007	Toronto, Canada	Hard	(Brazil) Maria Fernanda Alves	(Canada) Gabriela Dabrowski (Canada) Sharon Fichman	3–6, 0–6
Loss	24.	7 February 2008	Mildura, Australia	Grass	(Australia) Monique Adamczak	(New Zealand) Marina Erakovic (Australia) Nicole Kriz	4–6, 4–6
Win	25.	7 April 2008	ITF Biarritz, France	Clay	(Germany) Martina Müller	(Argentina) Jorgelina Cravero (Argentina) Betina Jozami	7–6^{(7–5)}, 3–6, [10–8]
Loss	26.	16 May 2008	ITF Caserta, Italy	Clay	(Australia) Sophie Ferguson	(China) Han Xinyun (China) Xu Yifan	6–4, 4–6, [8–10]
Loss	27.	2 June 2008	ITF Grado, Italy	Hard	(Mauritius) Marinne Giraud	(Colombia) Mariana Duque Mariño (Austria) Melanie Klaffner	1–6, 2–6

== Highest ranked player victories ==
No. 34 - (Russia) Tatiana Panova, 2001 No. 43 - (United States) Amy Frazier, 2003 No. 54 - (Russia) Anna Kournikova, 2002 No. 63 - (Italy) Sara Errani, 2008 No. 64 - (Chinese Taipei) Chan Yung-jan, 2008
