= Tathiana Garbin =

Italian tennis player

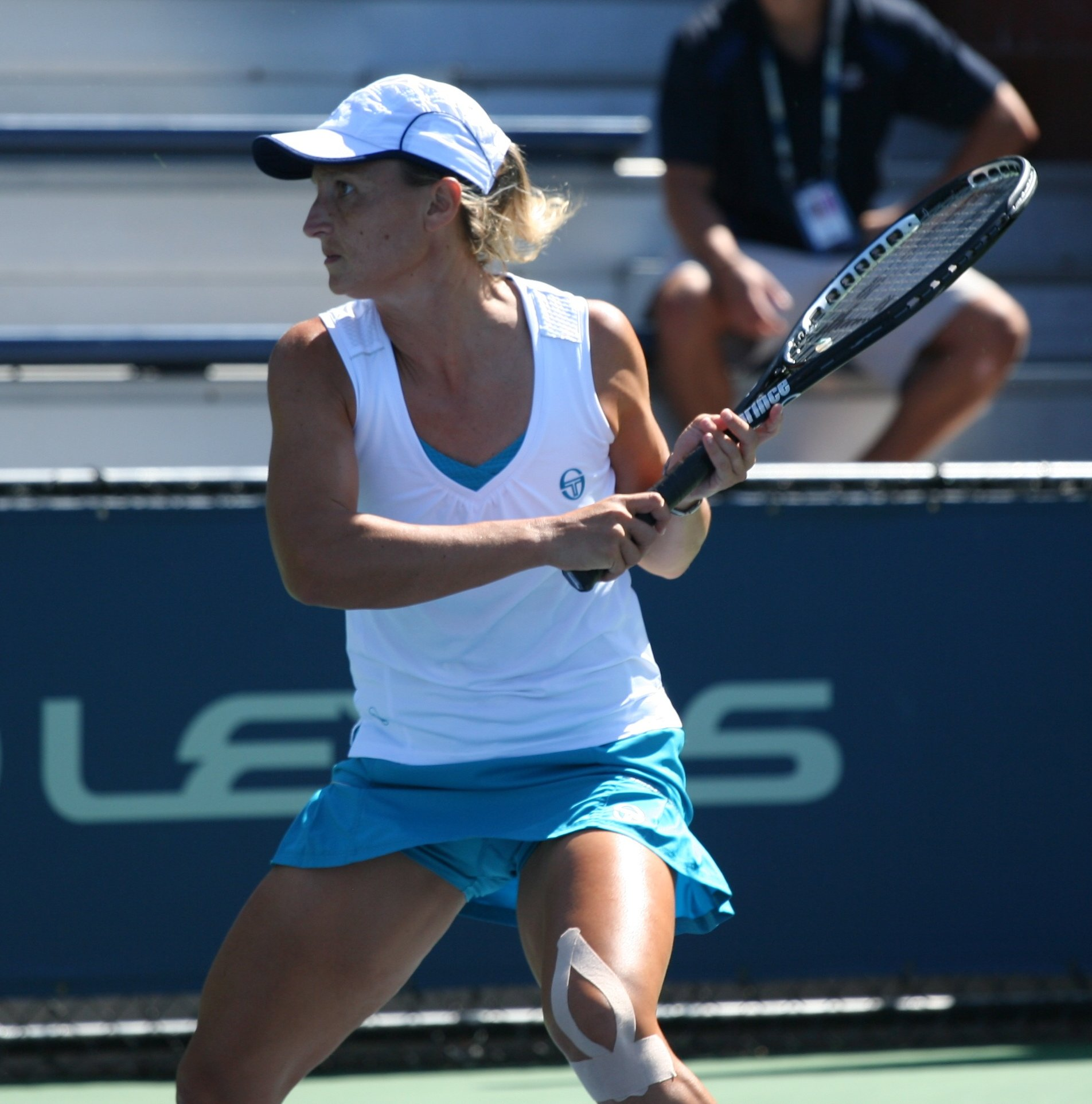
- Country (sports): Italy
- Residence: Bologna
- Born: 30 June 1977 (age 49) Mestre
- Height: 1.72 m (5 ft 8 in)
- Turned pro: 1996
- Retired: 2011
- Plays: Right (one handed-backhand)
- Prize money: $2,661,973

Singles
- Career record: 427–335
- Career titles: 1
- Highest ranking: No. 22 (21 May 2007)

Grand Slam singles results
- Australian Open: 3R (2007, 2010)
- French Open: 4R (2007)
- Wimbledon: 2R (2006, 2007, 2009)
- US Open: 3R (2000, 2008)

Doubles
- Career record: 282–239
- Career titles: 11
- Highest ranking: No. 25 (27 August 2001)

Grand Slam doubles results
- Australian Open: 3R (2000)
- French Open: 3R (2002, 2003)
- Wimbledon: QF (2009)
- US Open: 3R (2000, 2004, 2007, 2010)
Medal record
Representing Italy
Mediterranean Games
Gold medal – first place	1997 Bari	Singles
Silver medal – second place	1997 Bari	Doubles

Tathiana Garbin (Italian pronunciation: [taˈtjaːna ɡarˈbin]; born 30 June 1977) is an Italian former tennis player. She was gold medalist at the 1997 Mediterranean Games and the team captain who led the Italian national team (comprising Jasmine Paolini, Sara Errani, Martina Trevisan, Elisabetta Cocciaretto and Lucia Bronzetti) to the 2023 Billie Jean King Cup final and to victory in the 2024 Billie Jean King Cup and 2025 Billie Jean King Cup.

She was best known for her upset of the defending champion and the reigning world No. 1, Justine Henin, in the second round of the 2004 French Open. The winner of one singles and 11 doubles WTA Tour titles, she reached her highest singles ranking of world No. 22 on 21 May 2007, and her highest doubles ranking of No. 25 on 27 August 2001. Other high–ranked players whom she defeated include Jelena Dokić, Chanda Rubin, Flavia Pennetta, Agnieszka Radwańska, Nadia Petrova, Marion Bartoli, and Samantha Stosur.

== WTA Tour finals ==
=== Singles: 5 (1 title, 4 runner-ups) ===
Legend
Tier I
Tier II
Tier III (0–1)
Tier IV & V (1–3)

Result	Date	Tournament	Surface	Opponent	Score
Loss	Feb 2000	Copa Colsanitas, Colombia	Clay	(Austria) Patricia Wartusch	6–4, 1–6, 4–6
Win	Apr 2000	Budapest Grand Prix, Hungary	Clay	(Netherlands) Kristie Boogert	6–2, 7–6^{(4)}
Loss	Jul 2005	Internazionali di Modena, Italy	Clay	(Israel) Anna Smashnova	6–6 ret.
Loss	Jul 2006	Palermo Ladies Open, Italy	Clay	(Spain) Anabel Medina Garrigues	4–6, 4–6
Loss	Feb 2007	Copa Colsanitas, Colombia	Clay	(Italy) Roberta Vinci	7–6^{(5)}, 4–6, 3–0 ret.

=== Doubles: 18 (11 titles, 7 runner-ups) ===
Before 2009	Starting in 2009
Tier I (0–2)	Premier Mandatory
Tier II (0–1)	Premier 5
Tier III (2–0)	Premier (0–1)
Tier IV & V (3–2)	International (6–1)

Result	No.	Date	Tournament	Surface	Partner	Opponents	Score
Win	1.	14 May 2000	Warsaw Open, Poland	Clay	(Slovakia) Janette Husárová	(Uzbekistan) Iroda Tulyaganova (Ukraine) Anna Zaporozhanova	6–3, 6–1
Win	2.	25 February 2001	Copa Colsanitas, Colombia	Clay	(Slovakia) Janette Husárová	(Argentina) Laura Montalvo (Argentina) Paola Suárez	6–4, 2–6, 6–4
Win	3.	22 April 2001	Budapest Grand Prix, Hungary	Clay	(Slovakia) Janette Husárová	(Hungary) Zsófia Gubacsi (Serbia and Montenegro) Dragana Zarić	6–1, 6–3
Win	4.	15 July 2001	Palermo Ladies Open, Italy	Clay	(Slovakia) Janette Husárová	(Spain) Anabel Medina Garrigues (Spain) María José Martínez Sánchez	4–6, 6–2, 6–4
Win	5.	12 January 2002	Hobart International, Australia	Hard	(Italy) Rita Grande	(Australia) Catherine Barclay (Australia) Christina Wheeler	6–2, 7–6^{(3)}
Win	6.	5 May 2002	Bol Ladies Open, Croatia	Clay	(Indonesia) Angelique Widjaja	(Russia) Elena Bovina (Slovakia) Henrieta Nagyová	7–5, 3–6, 6–4
Loss	1.	14 July 2002	French Community Championships, Belgium	Clay	(Spain) Arantxa Sánchez Vicario	(Austria) Barbara Schwartz (Germany) Jasmin Wöhr	2–6, 6–0, 4–6
Loss	2.	24 August 2002	Connecticut Open, United States	Hard	(Slovakia) Janette Husárová	(Slovakia) Daniela Hantuchová (Spain) Arantxa Sánchez Vicario	3–6, 6–1, 5–7
Win	7.	11 January 2003	Canberra International, Australia	Hard	(France) Émilie Loit	(Czech Republic) Dája Bedáňová (Russia) Dinara Safina	6–3, 3–6, 6–4
Win	8.	16 January 2005	Canberra International, Australia	Hard	(Slovenia) Tina Križan	(Czech Republic) Gabriela Navrátilová (Czech Republic) Michaela Paštiková	7–5, 1–6, 6–4
Loss	3.	13 May 2007	German Open	Clay	(Italy) Roberta Vinci	(United States) Lisa Raymond (Australia) Samantha Stosur	3–6, 4–6
Loss	4.	20 May 2007	Italian Open	Clay	(Italy) Roberta Vinci	(France) Nathalie Dechy (Italy) Mara Santangelo	4–6, 1–6
Loss	5.	15 January 2010	Sydney International, Australia	Hard	(Russia) Nadia Petrova	(Zimbabwe) Cara Black (United States) Liezel Huber	1–6, 6–3, [3–10]
Loss	6.	17 April 2010	Barcelona Open, Spain	Clay	(Switzerland) Timea Bacsinszky	(Italy) Sara Errani (Italy) Roberta Vinci	1–6, 6–3, [2–10]
Win	9.	11 July 2010	Budapest Grand Prix, Hungary	Clay	(Switzerland) Timea Bacsinszky	(Romania) Sorana Cîrstea (Spain) Anabel Medina Garrigues	6–3, 6–3
Win	10.	18 July 2010	Prague Open, Czech Republic	Clay	(Switzerland) Timea Bacsinszky	(Romania) Monica Niculescu (Hungary) Ágnes Szávay	7–5, 7–6^{(4)}
Loss	7.	25 July 2010	Gastein Ladies, Austria	Clay	(Switzerland) Timea Bacsinszky	(Czech Republic) Lucie Hradecká (Spain) Anabel Medina Garrigues	7–6^{(2)}, 1–6, [5–10]
Win	11.	24 October 2010	Luxembourg Open	Hard (i)	(Switzerland) Timea Bacsinszky	(Czech Republic) Iveta Benešová (Czech Republic) Barbora Záhlavová-Strýcová	6–4, 6–4

== ITF Circuit finals ==
Legend
$100,000 tournaments
$75,000 tournaments
$50,000 tournaments
$25,000 tournaments
$10,000 tournaments

=== Singles: 17 (10–7) ===
Outcome	No.	Date	Tournament	Surface	Opponent	Score
Winner	1.	11 August 1996	ITF Catania, Italy	Clay	(Italy) Sabina da Ponte	6–3, 4–6, 7–5
Winner	2.	12 May 1997	ITF Novi Sad, Serbia	Clay	(Serbia) Dragana Zarić	6–4, 6–1
Winner	3.	5 December 1998	ITF New Delhi, India	Hard	(Netherlands) Amanda Hopmans	6–3, 6–2
Winner	4.	11 July 1999	ITF Civitanova, Italy	Clay	(Argentina) Mariana Díaz Oliva	6–4, 4–6, 6–1
Winner	5.	13 December 1999	ITF Manila, Philippines	Hard	(Indonesia) Wynne Prakusya	6–7, 6–0, 6–2
Runner-up	6.	13 December 1999	ITF New Delhi, India	Hard	(Hungary) Katalin Marosi	2–6, 1–1 ret.
Runner-up	7.	9 April 2000	Dubai Challenge, UAE	Hard	(Czech Republic) Adriana Gerši	4–6, 3–6
Winner	8.	29 April 2001	ITF Caserta, Italy	Clay	(Spain) María José Martínez Sánchez	3–6, 7–6, 6–2
Winner	9.	10 August 2003	ITF Cuneo, Italy	Clay	(Bulgaria) Lubomira Bacheva	6–3, 6–1
Runner-up	10.	5 June 2005	ITF Prostejov, Czech Republic	Clay	(Czech Republic) Lucie Šafářová	4–6, 6–3, 3–6
Runner-up	11.	23 April 2006	ITF Bari, Italy	Clay	(France) Alizé Cornet	2–6, 6–3, 2–6
Runner-up	12.	19 June 2006	Zagreb Ladies Open, Croatia	Clay	(Hungary) Kira Nagy	6–7, 6–3, 6–7
Runner-up	13.	1 October 2006	ITF Biella, Italy	Clay	(France) Stéphanie Foretz	5–7, 1–3 ret.
Winner	14.	19 June 2006	Zagreb Ladies Open, Croatia	Clay	(Russia) Ekaterina Lopes	6–3, 7–5
Winner	15.	8 June 2008	ITF Rome, Italy	Clay	(Austria) Yvonne Meusburger	6–4, 4–6, 7–6
Winner	16.	6 July 2008	International Cuneo, Italy	Clay	(Romania) Sorana Cîrstea	6–3, 6–1
Runner-up	17.	20 September 2009	Allianz Cup, Bulgaria	Clay	(Romania) Alexandra Dulgheru	7–6^{(4)}, 5–7, 1–6

=== Doubles: 17 (11–6) ===
Outcome	No.	Date	Tournament	Surface	Partner	Opponents	Score
Winner	1.	5 August 1996	ITF Catania, Italy	Clay	(San Marino) Francesca Guardigli	(Netherlands) Debby Haak (Netherlands) Frauke Joosten	6–2, 7–5
Runner-up	2.	13 January 1997	ITF Pontevedra, Spain	Hard (i)	(Italy) Sara Ventura	(Spain) Alicia Ortuño (Portugal) Sofia Prazeres	6–4, 1–6, 4–6
Winner	3.	12 May 1997	ITF Novi Sad, Serbia and Montenegro	Clay	(San Marino) Francesca Guardigli	(Bulgaria) Teodora Nedeva (Serbia and Montenegro) Dragana Zarić	6–4, 6–4
Runner-up	4.	26 May 1997	ITF Salzburg, Austria	Clay (i)	(Italy) Laura dell'Angelo	(Italy) Caroline Schneider (Austria) Patricia Wartusch	6–1, 3–6, 3–6
Runner-up	5.	26 January 1998	ITF Dinan, France	Clay (i)	(Romania) Oana Elena Golimbioschi	(France) Camille Pin (France) Aurélie Védy	w/o
Winner	6.	6 April 1998	ITF Athens, Greece	Clay	(Italy) Alice Canepa	(Romania) Alice Pirsu (Romania) Andreea Ehritt-Vanc	5–7, 6–2, 6–4
Winner	7.	5 July 1998	ITF Orbetello, Italy	Clay	(Italy) Alice Canepa	(United States) Melissa Mazzotta (Colombia) Fabiola Zuluaga	6–2, 6–3
Runner-up	8.	19 September 1999	ITF Reggio Calabria, Italy	Clay	(Italy) Alice Canepa	(Netherlands) Debby Haak (Netherlands) Andrea van den Hurk	1–6, 1–6
Winner	9.	11 October 1999	ITF Rhodes, Greece	Clay	(Netherlands) Amanda Hopmans	(Czech Republic) Lenka Cenková (Spain) Alicia Ortuño	4–6, 6–0, 7–6^{(3)}
Runner-up	10.	13 December 1998	ITF New Delhi, India	Hard	(India) Nirupama Sanjeev	(Japan) Rika Hiraki (United Kingdom) Lorna Woodroffe	2–5 ret.
Winner	11.	3 April 2000	Dubai Challenge, UAE	Hard	(Hungary) Katalin Marosi	(Germany) Angelika Bachmann (Slovenia) Tina Križan	7–6^{(5)}, 6–3
Winner	12.	12 June 2009	Open de Marseille, France	Clay	(Argentina) María Emilia Salerni	(Russia) Elena Bovina (Switzerland) Timea Bacsinszky	6–7^{(4)}, 6–3, [10–7]
Winner	13.	18 September 2009	Allianz Cup, Bulgaria	Clay	(Switzerland) Timea Bacsinszky	(Croatia) Petra Martić (Slovenia) Polona Hercog	6–2, 7–6^{(4)}
Winner	14.	27 September 2009	Open de Saint-Malo, France	Clay	(Switzerland) Timea Bacsinszky	(Slovenia) Andreja Klepač (France) Aurélie Védy	6–3, ret.
Runner-up	15.	4 October 2009	ITF Athens, Greece	Hard	(Switzerland) Timea Bacsinszky	(Greece) Eleni Daniilidou (Germany) Jasmin Wöhr	2–6, 7–5, [4–10]
Winner	16.	31 October 2009	ITF Ortisei, Italy	Carpet (i)	(Switzerland) Timea Bacsinszky	(Kazakhstan) Galina Voskoboeva (Czech Republic) Barbora Strýcová	6–2, 6–2
Winner	17	17 October 2010	ITF Torhout, Belgium	Hard	(Switzerland) Timea Bacsinszky	(Netherlands) Michaëlla Krajicek (Belgium) Yanina Wickmayer	6–4, 6–2

== Grand Slam performance timelines ==
Key
W	F	SF	QF	#R	RR	Q#	DNQ	A	NH

(W) winner; (F) finalist; (SF) semifinalist; (QF) quarterfinalist; (#R) rounds 4, 3, 2, 1; (RR) round-robin stage; (Q#) qualification round; (DNQ) did not qualify; (A) absent; (NH) not held; (SR) strike rate (events won / competed); (W–L) win–loss record.

=== Singles ===
Tournament	1998	1999	2000	2001	2002	2003	2004	2005	2006	2007	2008	2009	2010	2011	W-L
Australian Open	LQ	1R	1R	1R	2R	2R	1R	2R	1R	3R	2R	2R	3R	1R	9–13
French Open	LQ	A	3R	2R	2R	2R	3R	2R	3R	4R	1R	3R	2R	A	16–11
Wimbledon	LQ	LQ	1R	1R	1R	1R	1R	1R	2R	2R	1R	2R	1R	A	3–11
US Open	LQ	LQ	3R	A	1R	2R	2R	1R	2R	1R	3R	2R	1R	A	8–10

=== Doubles ===
Tournament	1998	1999	2000	2001	2002	2003	2004	2005	2006	2007	2008	2009	2010	2011	W-L
Australian Open	A	1R	3R	2R	2R	2R	1R	2R	2R	2R	2R	1R	2R	2R	11–13
French Open	A	A	1R	1R	3R	3R	2R	2R	1R	1R	1R	1R	1R	A	6–11
Wimbledon	1R	A	1R	3R	1R	2R	2R	1R	3R	1R	1R	QF	2R	A	10–12
US Open	A	A	3R	A	1R	1R	3R	2R	1R	3R	2R	1R	3R	A	10–10
