= Catherine Barclay =

Australian tennis player

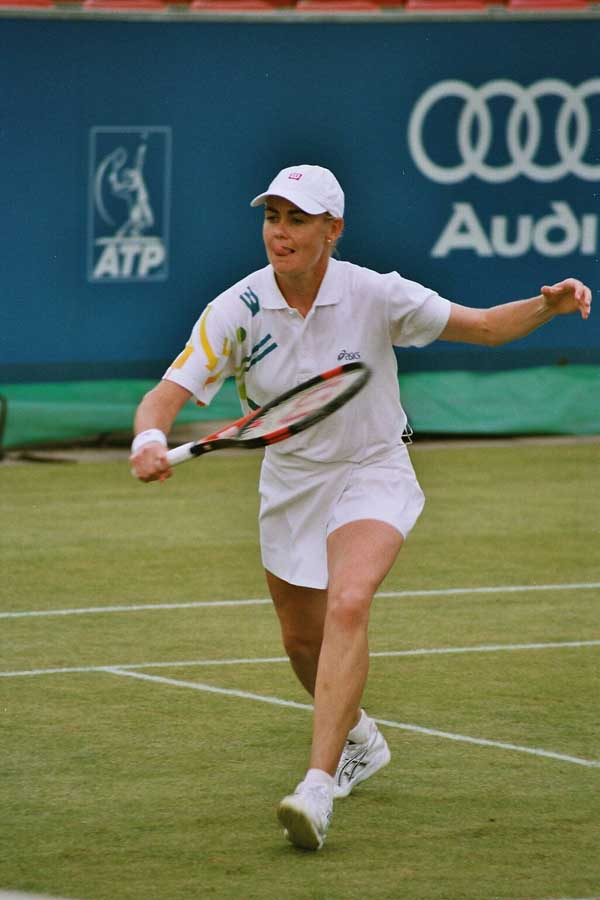
- Country (sports): Australia
- Residence: Sydney, New South Wales
- Born: 12 June 1973 (age 52) Sydney
- Height: 1.71 m (5 ft 7 in)
- Plays: Right-handed
- Prize money: $417,206

Singles
- Career record: 149–166
- Career titles: 3 ITF
- Highest ranking: No. 157 (23 November 1998)

Grand Slam singles results
- Australian Open: 1R (1991, 1998, 1999)

Doubles
- Career record: 304–185
- Career titles: 2 WTA, 30 ITF
- Highest ranking: No. 32 (20 July 1998)

Grand Slam doubles results
- Australian Open: 3R (1996)
- French Open: 3R (1993, 1998)
- Wimbledon: QF (1998)
- US Open: 2R (1996, 1998)

Catherine Barclay (born 12 June 1973) is a former professional tennis player from Australia.

Barclay's parents were the owners of a tennis facility in Sydney, and she began playing tennis at the age of eight.

In her junior career, she was a winner of the Wimbledon girls' doubles.

In her professional career, she won three ITF titles in singles and thirty in doubles. She was a quarterfinalist in the Wimbledon women's doubles and mixed doubles. In the 2002 season, she won two double titles on the WTA Tour.

On 30 August 2000, she was awarded the Australian Sports Medal for her strong commitment to tennis.

Catherine Barclay retired in 2004.

In 2003, she married field hockey player Christopher Reitz of Germany, and they reside in Sydney, Australia.

== WTA Tour finals ==
=== Doubles: 8 (2 titles, 6 runner-ups) ===
Legend
Grand Slam tournaments
Premier M & Premier 5
Premier
International (2–6)

Result	W/L	Date	Tournament	Surface	Partner	Opponents	Score
Loss	0–1	Jun 1994	Birmingham Classic, UK	Grass	(Australia) Kerry-Anne Guse	(United States) Zina Garrison (Soviet Union) Larisa Savchenko	4–6, 4–6
Loss	0–2	Jul 1997	Warsaw Cup, Poland	Clay	(Germany) Meike Babel	(Romania) Ruxandra Dragomir (Argentina) Inés Gorrochategui	4–6, 0–6
Loss	0–3	Apr 1999	Japan Open, Tokyo	Hard	(Australia) Kerry-Anne Guse	(United States) Corina Morariu (United States) Kimberly Po	3–6, 2–6
Loss	0–4	Jun 2000	Rosmalen Open, Netherlands	Grass	(Slovakia) Karina Habšudová	(United States) Erika deLone (Australia) Nicole Pratt	6–7^{(4–7)}, 3–4 ret.
Loss	0–5	Jul 2000	Knokke-Heist Championships, Belgium	Clay	(Denmark) Eva Dyrberg	(Italy) Giulia Casoni (Uzbekistan) Iroda Tulyaganova	6–2, 4–6, 4–6
Loss	0–6	Jan 2002	Hobart International, Australia	Hard	(Australia) Christina Wheeler	(Italy) Tathiana Garbin (Italy) Rita Grande	2–6, 6–7^{(3–7)}
Win	1–6	Apr 2002	Budapest Grand Prix, Hungary	Clay	(France) Émilie Loit	(Russia) Elena Bovina (Hungary) Zsófia Gubacsi	4–6, 6–3, 6–3
Win	2–6	Jun 2002	Rosmalen Open, Netherlands	Grass	(Germany) Martina Müller	(Germany) Bianka Lamade (Bulgaria) Magdalena Maleeva	6–4, 7–5

== ITF Circuit finals ==
Legend
$75,000 tournaments
$50,000 tournaments
$25,000 tournaments
$10,000 tournaments

=== Singles: 10 (3–7) ===
Result	No.	Date	Tournament	Surface	Opponent	Score
Loss	1.	14 October 1990	ITF Matsuyama, Japan	Hard	(Japan) Rika Hiraki	4–6, 2–6
Loss	2.	17 May 1992	ITF Barcelona, Spain	Clay	(Argentina) Paola Suárez	4–6, 1–6
Win	3.	21 March 1993	ITF Canberra, Australia	Grass	(Australia) Jane Taylor	6–4, 4–6, 6–2
Loss	4.	28 March 1993	ITF Bendigo, Australia	Grass	(Australia) Jane Taylor	6–4, 0–6, 6–7
Win	5.	11 October 1993	ITF Kuroshio, Japan	Hard	(Japan) Hiroko Mochizuki	2–6, 6–1, 6–2
Win	6.	6 November 1994	ITF Saga, Japan	Grass	(Australia) Annabel Ellwood	6–2, 7–5
Loss	7.	4 May 1997	ITF Balaguer, Spain	Clay	(Spain) Noelia Serra	6–3, 3–6, 3–6
Loss	8.	21 September 1997	Taipei Challenger, Taiwan	Hard	(Australia) Kerry-Anne Guse	4–6, 6–7
Loss	9.	25 October 1998	ITF Gold Coast, Australia	Hard	(Australia) Alicia Molik	4–6, 6–7
Loss	10.	15 November 1998	Bendigo International, Australia	Hard	(Australia) Cindy Watson	6–3, 0–6, 5–7

=== Doubles: 45 (30–15) ===
Result	No.	Date	Tournament	Surface	Partner	Opponents	Score
Win	1.	12 February 1990	ITF Adelaide, Australia	Hard	(Australia) Kerry-Anne Guse	(Australia) Maija Avotins (Australia) Joanne Limmer	6–0, 6–0
Loss	2.	13 May 1990	ITF Swansea, United Kingdom	Clay	(Australia) Louise Stacey	(Australia) Nicole Pratt (Australia) Kirrily Sharpe	1–6, 2–6
Loss	3.	20 May 1990	ITF Bournemouth, United Kingdom	Clay	(Australia) Louise Stacey	(Australia) Nicole Pratt (Australia) Kirrily Sharpe	1–6, 2–6
Loss	4.	30 September 1990	ITF Kuroshio, Japan	Clay	(Australia) Angie Cunningham	(Japan) Naoko Kinoshita (Japan) Emiko Takahashi	4–6, 6–4, 2–6
Loss	5.	14 October 1990	ITF Matsuyama, Japan	Clay	(Australia) Angie Cunningham	(Australia) Kerry-Anne Guse (Australia) Kristine Kunce	7–6, 3–6, ret.
Loss	6.	6 May 1991	ITF Lee-on-the-Solent, United Kingdom	Clay	(Australia) Robyn Mawdsley	(Germany) Anke Marchl (Germany) Christina Singer	6–4, 6–7, 1–6
Win	7.	25 November 1991	ITF Mildura, Australia	Hard	(Australia) Louise Stacey	(Netherlands) Ingelise Driehuis (Australia) Louise Pleming	6–4, 6–3
Loss	8.	18 May 1992	ITF Tortosa, Spain	Clay	(Canada) Martina Crha	(Sweden) Maria-Farnes Capistrano (Poland) Katarzyna Teodorowicz-Lisowska	6–4, 2–6, 5–7
Win	9.	16 November 1992	ITF Mount Gambier, Australia	Clay	(Australia) Louise Stacey	(Czechoslovak Socialist Republic) Janette Husárová (Czechoslovak Socialist Republic) Eva Martincová	7–6^{(7)}, 6–7^{(4)}, 7–6^{(3)}
Win	10.	6 December 1992	ITF Mildura, Australia	Hard	(Australia) Louise Stacey	(Australia) Michelle Jaggard-Lai (Australia) Elizabeth Smylie	6–3, 6–4
Win	11.	7 March 1993	ITF Mildura, Australia	Grass	(Australia) Kirrily Sharpe	(Australia) Kate McDonald (Australia) Jane Taylor	6–1, 6–2
Win	12.	14 November 1993	Bendigo International, Australia	Hard	(Australia) Kerry-Anne Guse	(Australia) Jo-Anne Faull (Australia) Kirrily Sharpe	6–2, 3–6, 7–6
Win	13.	5 December 1993	ITF Mildura, Australia	Hard	(Australia) Kerry-Anne Guse	(Australia) Jo-Anne Faull (Australia) Kirrily Sharpe	6–3, 6–2
Win	14.	30 October 1994	ITF Tarakan, Indonesia	Hard	(Australia) Kerry-Anne Guse	(Japan) Yone Kamio (Japan) Naoko Kijimuta	6–2, 6–3
Win	15.	21 November 1994	ITF Mount Gambier, Australia	Hard	(United States) Shannan McCarthy	(Croatia) Maja Murić (Australia) Louise Pleming	6–3, 6–4
Loss	16.	11 December 1994	ITF Nuriootpa, Australia	Hard	(Australia) Kerry-Anne Guse	(Australia) Kristin Godridge (Australia) Kirrily Sharpe	2–6, 7–6, 4–6
Loss	17.	12 December 1994	ITF Mildura, Australia	Grass	(Australia) Louise Pleming	(France) Catherine Tanvier (Canada) Vanessa Webb	6–7, 6–4, 3–6
Win	18.	8 May 1995	ITF Szczecin, Poland	Clay	(United Kingdom) Shirli-Ann Siddall	(Australia) Kristin Godridge (Australia) Kirrily Sharpe	5–7, 7–5, 7–6^{(4)}
Loss	19.	23 July 1995	ITF Wilmington, United States	Hard	(United States) Audra Keller	(South Africa) Tessa Price (United Kingdom) Clare Wood	6–3, 1–6, 1–6
Win	20.	4 December 1995	ITF Port Pirie, Australia	Hard	(Australia) Jenny Byrne	(South Africa) Mareze Joubert (Australia) Joanne Limmer	6–1, 6–3
Win	21.	5 May 1996	ITF Seoul, South Korea	Hard	(Australia) Kerry-Anne Guse	(Thailand) Benjamas Sangaram (South Korea) Choi Young-ja	6–1, 6–2
Win	22.	6 May 1996	ITF Seoul, South Korea	Clay	(Australia) Kerry-Anne Guse	(Japan) Yuko Hosoki (Japan) Yuka Tanaka	4–6, 6–0, 6–3
Loss	23.	10 November 1996	ITF Mount Gambier, Australia	Hard	(Australia) Kirrily Sharpe	(Australia) Lisa McShea (Australia) Joanne Limmer	4–6, 6–2, 5–7
Win	24.	17 November 1996	ITF Port Pirie, Australia	Hard	(Australia) Kirrily Sharpe	(Australia) Lisa McShea (Australia) Joanne Limmer	7–6, 7–6
Win	25.	15 December 1996	ITF Hope Island, Australia	Hard	(Australia) Kerry-Anne Guse	(Australia) Lisa McShea (Australia) Joanne Limmer	6–4, 6–4
Win	26.	8 June 1997	Surbiton Trophy, United Kingdom	Grass	(Australia) Kerry-Anne Guse	(United States) Debbie Graham (Australia) Kristine Kunce	3–6, 6–4, 7–6
Win	27.	14 September 1997	ITF Seoul, South Korea	Hard	(Australia) Kerry-Anne Guse	(South Korea) Park Sung-hee (Chinese Taipei) Wang Shi-ting	4–6, 6–4, 6–1
Loss	28.	15 September 1997	Taipei Challenger, Taiwan	Hard	(Australia) Kerry-Anne Guse	(South Korea) Choi Young-ja (South Korea) Kim Eun-ha	6–1, 4–6, 3–6
Win	29.	10 November 1997	ITF Mount Gambier, Australia	Hard	(South Korea) Kim Eun-ha	(Australia) Renee Reid (Hungary) Réka Vidáts	6–3, 6–2
Win	30.	30 November 1997	ITF Nuriootpa, Australia	Hard	(Australia) Kerry-Anne Guse	(South Africa) Nannie de Villiers (Australia) Lisa McShea	6–3, 7–5
Win	31.	15 February 1998	Midland Classic, United States	Hard (i)	(Australia) Kerry-Anne Guse	(Belarus) Olga Barabanschikova (United States) Erika deLone	6–2, 6–4
Win	32.	22 February 1998	ITF Rochester, United States	Hard (i)	(Australia) Kerry-Anne Guse	(South Africa) Nannie de Villiers (United States) Ginger Helgeson-Nielsen	6–4, 6–4
Win	33.	26 April 1998	ITF Shenzhen, China	Hard	(South Korea) Kim Eun-ha	(Australia) Gail Biggs (Japan) Tomoe Hotta	6–3, 6–2
Win	34.	3 May 1998	Kangaroo Cup, Japan	Grass	(Australia) Kerry-Anne Guse	(South Korea) Cho Yoon-jeong (South Korea) Park Sung-hee	7–6^{(3)}, 6–4
Win	35.	11 October 1998	ITF Saga, Japan	Grass	(Australia) Alicia Molik	(Australia) Evie Dominikovic (Australia) Bryanne Stewart	7–6, 6–4
Loss	36.	18 October 1998	ITF Seoul, South Korea	Clay	(South Korea) Choi Young-ja	(Japan) Shinobu Asagoe (Germany) Kirstin Freye	2–6, 6–7
Win	37.	25 October 1998	ITF Gold Coast, Australia	Hard	(Australia) Kerry-Anne Guse	(Australia) Lisa McShea (Australia) Trudi Musgrave	6–4, 6–2
Win	38.	15 November 1998	Bendigo International, Australia	Hard	(Australia) Kerry-Anne Guse	(United States) Dawn Buth (Canada) Vanessa Webb	6–7, 6–3, 6–1
Win	39.	22 November 1998	ITF Port Pirie, Australia	Hard	(Australia) Trudi Musgrave	(Australia) Amanda Grahame (Australia) Bryanne Stewart	5–7, 7–5, 6–2
Loss	40.	29 November 1998	ITF Nuriootpa, Australia	Hard	(Australia) Trudi Musgrave	(Australia) Danielle Jones (Canada) Vanessa Webb	3–6, 5–7
Loss	41.	28 March 1999	ITF Atlanta, United States	Hard	(United States) Katie Schlukebir	(Czech Republic) Lenka Němečková (United States) Meilen Tu	3–6, 3–6
Win	42.	3 October 1999	ITF Seoul, South Korea	Hard	(South Korea) Kim Eun-ha	(Thailand) Tamarine Tanasugarn (South Korea) Park Sung-hee	4–6, 6–4, 6–2
Win	43.	9 October 1999	ITF Saga, Japan	Grass	(Canada) Vanessa Webb	(South Korea) Kim Eun-ha (Slovenia) Petra Rampre	6–7, 6–3, 6–2
Win	44.	30 July 2000	ITF Dublin, Ireland	Carpet	(Netherlands) Andrea van den Hurk	(Australia) Trudi Musgrave (United Kingdom) Lorna Woodroffe	6–4, 7–5
Loss	45.	19 November 2001	ITF Nuriootpa, Australia	Hard	(Australia) Christina Wheeler	(Australia) Evie Dominikovic (Australia) Samantha Stosur	1–6, 7–6^{(5)}, 4–6
