= Giulia Casoni =

Italian tennis player

- Country (sports): Italy
- Residence: Ferrara, Italy
- Born: 19 April 1978 (age 46); Ferrara
- Height: 1.69 m (5 ft 6 1/2 in)
- Turned pro: 1993
- Retired: 2006
- Plays: Right-handed (two-handed backhand)
- Prize money: US$ 326,936

Singles
- Career record: 269–233
- Career titles: 0 WTA, 4 ITF
- Highest ranking: 83 (8 January 2001)

Grand Slam singles results
- Australian Open: 1R (2001)
- French Open: 3R (2000)
- Wimbledon: 1R (2000, 2001)
- US Open: 3R (2000)

Doubles
- Career record: 225–127
- Career titles: 3 WTA, 27 ITF
- Highest ranking: 51 (19 February 2001)

Grand Slam doubles results
- Australian Open: 2R (2001)
- French Open: 2R (2000)
- Wimbledon: 1R (2000, 2001)
- US Open: 1R (2000, 2001)

Giulia Casoni (Italian pronunciation: [ˈdʒuːlja kaˈzoːni -ˈsoː-]; born 19 April 1978) is an Italian former professional tennis player.

As a junior player, she won 1996 French Open in doubles, while her best professional results include singles quarterfinals at the Internazionali Femminili di Palermo in 1999 and Tier I Italian Open in 2000, and three WTA Tour doubles titles. She was a member of Italy Fed Cup team from 2000 to 2001, and won three doubles titles at WTA tournaments.

Casoni defeated players such as Dominique Monami, Katarina Srebotnik, Mariya Koryttseva, Francesca Schiavone, Émilie Loit and Nuria Llagostera Vives. She also won four singles and 27 doubles titles on the ITF Women's Circuit.

Casoni retired from tennis in 2006, after struggling with a knee injury.

== Personal life ==
Casoni was born to Ilario and Angela Casoni, and has a brother Lorenzo.

== WTA Tour finals ==
=== Doubles: 4 (3 titles, 1 runner-up) ===
Legend
Grand Slam tournaments
Tier I 5 (0–0)
Tier II (0–0)
Tier III, IV & V (3–1)

| Result | Date | Tournament | Surface | Partner | Opponents | Score |
|---|---|---|---|---|---|---|
| Loss | Jul 1994 | Palermo, Italy | Clay | (Italy) Alice Canepa | (Romania) Ruxandra Dragomir (Italy) Laura Garrone | 1–6, 0–6 |
| Win | Jul 2000 | Knokke-Heist, Belgium | Clay | (Uzbekistan) Iroda Tulyaganova | (Australia) Catherine Barclay (Denmark) Eva Dyrberg | 2–6, 6–4, 6–4 |
| Win | Jan 2001 | Gold Coast, Australia | Hard | (Slovakia) Janette Husárová | (United States) Katie Schlukebir (United States) Meghann Shaughnessy | 7–6^{(11–9)}, 7–5 |
| Win | Jul 2005 | Palermo, Italy | Clay | (Ukraine) Mariya Koryttseva | (Poland) Klaudia Jans (Poland) Alicja Rosolska | 4–6, 6–3, 7–5 |

== Junior Grand Slam finals ==
=== Girls' doubles: 1 (title) ===
| Outcome | Year | Tournament | Surface | Partner | Opponents | Score |
|---|---|---|---|---|---|---|
| Winner | 1996 | French Open | Clay | (Italy) Alice Canepa | (Russia) Anna Kournikova (Czech Republic) Ludmilla Varmuzova | 6–2, 5–7, 7–5 |

== ITF Circuit finals ==
$50,000 tournaments
$25,000 tournaments
$10,000 tournaments

=== Singles (4–6) ===
| Result | No. | Date | Tournament | Surface | Opponent | Score |
|---|---|---|---|---|---|---|
| Loss | 1. | 28 August 1994 | Alghero, Italy | Hard | (United States) Corina Morariu | 5–7, 6–7^{(5)} |
| Win | 2. | 18 June 1995 | Fontanafredda, Italy | Clay | (Italy) Monica Guglielmi | 7–6, 7–6 |
| Win | 3. | 4 August 1996 | Catania, Italy | Clay | (Netherlands) Debby Haak | 4–6, 6–3, 6–4 |
| Win | 4. | 31 March 1997 | Makarska, Croatia | Clay | (Hungary) Anna Földényi | 3–6, 6–2, 6–4 |
| Loss | 5. | 3 August 1997 | Catania, Italy | Clay | (Italy) Antonella Serra Zanetti | 7–6^{(3)}, 3–6, 3–6 |
| Loss | 6. | 8 December 1997 | Espinho, Portugal | Clay | (Italy) Maria Paola Zavagli | 5–7, 6–7^{(8)} |
| Loss | 7. | 7 February 1998 | Birkenhead, United Kingdom | Hard (i) | (Hungary) Petra Mandula | 0–6, 6–2, 3–6 |
| Loss | 8. | 13 December 1998 | Mallorca, Spain | Clay | (Spain) Rosa María Andrés Rodríguez | 7–5, 4–6, 3–6 |
| Win | 9. | 20 June 1999 | Istanbul, Turkey | Hard | (Germany) Petra Begerow | 7–5, 1–6, 6–4 |
| Loss | 10. | 19 April 2000 | Cagnes-sur-Mer, France | Hard | (Uzbekistan) Iroda Tulyaganova | 2–6, 3–6 |

=== Doubles (27–10) ===
| Result | No. | Date | Tournament | Surface | Partner | Opponents | Score |
|---|---|---|---|---|---|---|---|
| Win | 1. | 5 September 1993 | Fontanafredda, Italy | Clay | (Italy) Alice Canepa | (Italy) Germana di Natale (Italy) Giulia Toschi | 7–6, 6–1 |
| Loss | 2. | 21 August 1994 | Koksijde, Belgium | Clay | (Italy) Sara Ventura | (Italy) Francesca Lubiani (Italy) Maria Paola Zavagli | 6–7, 5–7 |
| Win | 3. | 24 April 1995 | Bari, Italy | Clay | (Italy) Alice Canepa | (Federal Republic of Yugoslavia) Marina Gojković (Serbia) Dragana Zarić | 6–0, 6–0 |
| Loss | 4. | 12 June 1995 | Massa, Italy | Clay | (Italy) Alice Canepa | (Switzerland) Emmanuelle Gagliardi (Italy) Marzia Grossi | 6–3, 4–6, 5–7 |
| Win | 5. | 18 March 1996 | Reims, France | Clay | (Italy) Flora Perfetti | (Australia) Siobhan Drake-Brockman (France) Catherine Tanvier | 6–3, 4–6, 6–0 |
| Win | 6. | 27 July 1997 | Camaiore, Italy | Clay | (Italy) Federica Fortuni | (Australia) Cindy Dock (Australia) Jenny-Anne Fetch | 6–4, 6–1 |
| Win | 7. | 3 August 1997 | Muri Antichi, Italy | Clay | (Italy) Federica Fortuni | (Ukraine) Natalia Bondarenko (Bulgaria) Biljana Pawlowa-Dimitrova | 7–6, 6–2 |
| Win | 8. | 10 August 1997 | Catania, Italy | Clay | (Italy) Sabina Da Ponte | (China) Ding Ding (China) Ni Wei | 6–4, 6–2 |
| Win | 9. | 8 December 1997 | Espinho, Portugal | Clay | (Italy) Maria Paola Zavagli | (Spain) Tamara Aranda (Spain) Julia Carballal | 6–2, 6–4 |
| Win | 10. | 7 February 1998 | Birkenhead, United Kingdom | Hard (i) | (Ukraine) Anna Zaporozhanova | (Russia) Natalia Egorova (Russia) Olga Ivanova | 6–3, 6–2 |
| Loss | 11. | 24 August 1998 | Milan, Italy | Grass | (Croatia) Marijana Kovačević | (Japan) Hiroko Mochizuki (Japan) Ryoko Takemura | 6–4, 6–7^{(5)}, 4–6 |
| Loss | 12. | 27 September 1998 | Lecce, Italy | Clay | (Italy) Stefania Chieppa | (Italy) Katia Altilia (Austria) Stefanie Haidner | 0–6, 2–6 |
| Win | 13. | 13 December 1998 | Mallorca, Spain | Clay | (Italy) Katia Altilia | (Spain) Paula Garcia (Republic of Ireland) Kelly Liggan | 6–3, 7–6^{(4)} |
| Loss | 14. | 7 June 1999 | Galatina, İtaly | Clay | (Italy) Maria Paola Zavagli | (Argentina) Mariana Díaz Oliva (Argentina) Erica Krauth | 1–6, 3–6 |
| Win | 15. | 20 June 1999 | Istanbul, Turkey | Hard | (Germany) Kirstin Freye | (Slovakia) Andrea Šebová (Czech Republic) Magdalena Zděnovcová | 6–3, 6–3 |
| Win | 16. | 6 March 2000 | Urtijëi, Italy | Hard (i) | (Italy) Antonella Serra Zanetti | (Germany) Angelika Bachmann (Denmark) Eva Dyrberg | 6–3, 4–6, 2–6 |
| Win | 17. | 10 April 2000 | Cagnes-sur-Mer, France | Hard (i) | (Germany) Angelika Bachmann | (Uzbekistan) Iroda Tulyaganova (Ukraine) Anna Zaporozhanova | 7–5, 6–1 |
| Loss | 18. | 22 October 2000 | Cardiff, United Kingdom | Carpet (i) | (Belgium) Laurence Courtois | (United Kingdom) Julie Pullin (United Kingdom) Lorna Woodroffe | 6–0, 1–6, 3–6 |
| Win | 19. | 29 July 2001 | Pamplona, Spain | Hard | (Italy) Roberta Vinci | (Australia) Trudi Musgrave (United Kingdom) Julie Pullin | 7–6, 6–4 |
| Win | 20. | 3 September 2001 | Fano, Italy | Clay | (Hungary) Katalin Marosi | (Spain) Eva Bes (Spain) Gisela Riera | 6–3, 6–4 |
| Loss | 21. | 27 January 2002 | Fullerton, United States | Hard | (Netherlands) Amanda Hopmans | (United States) Melissa Middleton (United States) Brie Rippner | 6–2, 4–6, 5–7 |
| Win | 22. | 3 February 2002 | Rockford, United States | Hard (i) | (Netherlands) Amanda Hopmans | (United States) Melissa Middleton (United States) Brie Rippner | 6–4, ret. |
| Loss | 23. | 11 February 2003 | Southampton, United Kingdom | Hard (i) | (Italy) Roberta Vinci | (Belarus) Olga Barabanschikova (Belarus) Nadejda Ostrovskaya | 3–6, 4–6 |
| Win | 24. | 7 September 2003 | Fano, Italy | Clay | (Spain) Conchita Martínez Granados | (Spain) Gala León García (Argentina) María Emilia Salerni | 6–3, 6–3 |
| Win | 25. | 5 October 2003 | Caserta, Italy | Clay | (Estonia) Maret Ani | (Spain) Rosa María Andrés Rodríguez (Morocco) Bahia Mouhtassine | 7–5, 7–5 |
| Loss | 26. | 23 May 2004 | Caserta, Italy | Clay | (Czech Republic) Vladimíra Uhlířová | (Romania) Andreea Ehritt-Vanc (Spain) Rosa María Andrés Rodríguez | 1–6, 6–4, 4–6 |
| Win | 27. | 31 May 2004 | Galatina, Italy | Clay | (Czech Republic) Vladimíra Uhlířová | (Belarus) Nadejda Ostrovskaya (Germany) Kathrin Wörle | 6–4, 6–0 |
| Loss | 28. | 9 August 2004 | Martina Franca, Italy | Clay | (Italy) Nina Bratchikova | (France) Aurélie Védy (Germany) Jasmin Wöhr | 1–6, 6–3, 6–7 |
| Win | 29. | 28 September 2004 | Belgrade, Serbia | Clay | (Croatia) Darija Jurak | (Russia) Ekaterina Bychkova (Belarus) Nadejda Ostrovskaya | 6–0, 6–2 |
| Win | 30. | 19 December 2004 | Bergamo, Italy | Hard | (Italy) Francesca Lubiani | (Czech Republic) Lenka Němečková (Germany) Julia Schruff | 6–2, 6–3 |
| Win | 31. | 13 February 2005 | Redbridge, United Kingdom | Hard (i) | (Italy) Francesca Lubiani | (Belarus) Darya Kustova (Russia) Ekaterina Makarova | 6–4, 6–3 |
| Win | 32. | 7 May 2005 | Catania, Italy | Clay | (Italy) Alberta Brianti | (Italy) Giulia Gabba (Italy) Valentina Sulpizio | 6–3, 6–3 |
| Win | 33. | 28 May 2005 | Campobasso, Italy | Clay | (Morocco) Bahia Mouhtassine | (Slovakia) Katarína Kachlíková (Slovakia) Lenka Tvarošková | 6–0, 7–5 |
| Win | 34. | 12 June 2005 | Gorizia, Italy | Clay | (Italy) Valentina Sulpizio | (Ukraine) Olena Antypina (Russia) Nina Bratchikova | 6–2, 6–0 |
| Win | 35. | 14 August 2005 | Rimini, Italy | Clay | (Ukraine) Mariya Koryttseva | (Belarus) Darya Kustova (Russia) Ekaterina Makarova | 6–2, 6–4 |
| Win | 36. | 19 February 2006 | Saguenay, Canada | Hard (i) | (Italy) Alberta Brianti | (United States) Raquel Atawo (United States) Aleke Tsoubanos | 6–4, 7–6^{(4)} |
| Win | 37. | 26 February 2006 | Saint-Georges, Canada | Hard (i) | (Italy) Alberta Brianti | (Czech Republic) Veronika Chvojková (Slovakia) Dominika Cibulková | 6–2, 3–6, 6–1 |
