= Eva Dyrberg =

Danish former tennis player

- Country (sports): Denmark
- Residence: Copenhagen, Denmark
- Born: 17 February 1980 (age 46) Copenhagen, Denmark
- Height: 1.75 m (5 ft 9 in)
- Turned pro: 1999
- Retired: 2009
- Plays: Right-handed (two-handed backhand)
- Prize money: US$225,826

Singles
- Career record: 140–95
- Career titles: 0 WTA, 4 ITF
- Highest ranking: 77 (20 May 2002)

Grand Slam singles results
- Australian Open: 1R (2002, 2003)
- French Open: 1R (2002)
- Wimbledon: 1R (2002)
- US Open: 1R (2002)

Doubles
- Career record: 61–63
- Career titles: 0 WTA, 5 ITF
- Highest ranking: 90 (9 October 2000)

Grand Slam doubles results
- Australian Open: 1R (2001, 2002)
- French Open: 1R (2001)
- Wimbledon: 2R (2000)
- US Open: 2R (2000)

Eva Dyrberg (born 17 February 1980) is a Danish former tennis player. As a junior player, she won 1998 Wimbledon Championships with Jelena Kostanić and 1998 US Open with Kim Clijsters. In 1998, Dyrberg was also ranked World No. 1 in junior doubles and was named ITF Junior Girls Doubles World Champion. During her professional career, she won four singles and five doubles events organized by the International Tennis Federation, defeating players such as Magdalena Maleeva, Tathiana Garbin, Maria Elena Camerin, Nicole Pratt, and reaching one doubles final at WTA Tour, at Sanex Trophy in 2000. She retired from professional tennis after the 2003 Australian Open.

== Personal life ==
Dyrberg was born to Christian and Gunhild Dyrberg, and has a sister Anne. She began playing tennis aged six, admiring Steffi Graf. Dyrberg earned her high school degree in 1999. She was coached by Ola Kristiansson and former WTA Tour player Tine Scheuer-Larsen. Eva forms couple with the Investment Banker, Per Harald Dyrberg Mortensen.

== Award ==
- 1998 – ITF Junior Girls Doubles World Champion

== WTA finals ==
=== Doubles (1–0) ===
Legend
Grand Slam (0/0)
WTA Tour Championship (0/0)
Tier I (0/0)
Tier II (0/0)
Tier III (0/0)
Tier IV (0/1)

Result	No.	Date	Tournament	Surface	Partner	Opponents	Score
Loss	1.	23 July 2000	Knokke-Heist, Belgium	Clay	(Australia) Catherine Barclay	(Italy) Giulia Casoni (Uzbekistan) Iroda Tulyaganova	6–2, 4–6, 4–6

== ITF finals ==
=== Singles: 7 (4–3) ===
Legend
$100,000 tournaments
$75,000 tournaments
$50,000 tournaments
$25,000 tournaments
$10,000 tournaments

Outcome	No.	Date	Tournament	Surface	Opponent	Result
Winner	1.	2 November 1998	Rungsted, Denmark	Hard (i)	(Estonia) Maret Ani	6–3, 6–4
Winner	2.	15 March 1999	Ashkelon, İsrael	Hard	(Ukraine) Tatiana Perebiynis	6–4, 6–4
Winner	3.	13 March 2000	Lisbon, Portugal	Clay	(Russia) Marina Samoilenko	6–3, 6–0
Winner	4.	5 February 2001	Redbridge, Great Britain	Hard (i)	(Luxembourg) Claudine Schaul	6–2, 6–2
Runner-up	1.	2 April 2001	Ciudad Juárez, Mexico	Clay	(Italy) Nathalie Viérin	3–6, 6–2, 3–6
Runner-up	2.	9 October 2001	Cardiff, Great Britain	Carpet (i)	(United Kingdom) Julie Pullin	1–6, 7–6^{(7–1)}, 2–6
Runner-up	3.	15 October 2001	Southampton, Great Britain	Hard (i)	(Kazakhstan) Irina Selyutina	6–2, 4–6, 6–3

=== Doubles: 8 (5–3) ===
Outcome	No.	Date	Tournament	Surface	Partner	Opponents	Result
Runner-up	1.	20 October 1997	Joué-lès-Tours, France	Hard (i)	(Denmark) Maiken Pape	(Czech Republic) Milena Nekvapilová (Czech Republic) Hana Šromová	7–5, 3–6, 4–6
Winner	1.	28 September 1998	Glasgow, Great Britain	Carpet (i)	(Germany) Lydia Steinbach	(United Kingdom) Helen Crook (United Kingdom) Victoria Davies	6–4, 5–7, 6–3
Winner	2.	5 July 1999	Civitanova Marche, Italy	Clay	(Slovakia) Daniela Hantuchová	(Spain) Rosa María Andrés Rodríguez (Spain) Conchita Martínez Granados	7–6^{(7–3)}, 4–6, 6–4
Winner	3.	29 November 1999	Cergy Pontoise, France	Hard (i)	(Germany) Jasmin Wöhr	(Germany) Anca Barna (Germany) Adriana Barna	2–6, 6–2, 6–4
Runner-up	2.	6 March 2000	Urtijëi, Italy	Hard (i)	(Germany) Angelika Bachmann	(Italy) Giulia Casoni (Italy) Antonella Serra Zanetti	3–6, 6–4, 6–2
Runner-up	3.	2 October 2000	Batumi, Georgia	Carpet (i)	(Argentina) Mariana Díaz Oliva	(Ukraine) Tatiana Perebiynis (Belarus) Tatiana Poutchek	4–1, 2–4, 1–4, 2–4
Winner	4.	5 March 2001	Urtijëi, Italy	Hard (i)	(Germany) Angelika Bachmann	(Russia) Ekaterina Kozhokina (Republic of Ireland) Kelly Liggan	3–6, 6–4, 6–2
Winner	5.	23 July 2001	Ettenheim, Germany	Clay	(Slovenia) Maja Matevžič	(Hungary) Katalin Marosi (Kazakhstan) Irina Selyutina	W/O

== Grand Slam girls' doubles finals: 2 (2–0) ==
Result	Year	Tournament	Surface	Partner	Opponents	Result
Win	1998	Wimbledon	Grass	(Croatia) Jelena Kostanić	(Slovenia) Petra Rampre (Uzbekistan) Iroda Tulyaganova	6–2, 7–6
Win	1998	US Open	Hard	(Belgium) Kim Clijsters	(Australia) Jelena Dokić (Australia) Evie Dominikovic	7–6, 6–4

Preceded by Irina Selytina & Cara Black	ITF Junior Girls Doubles World Champion; 1998	Succeeded by Daniela Bedáňová
