= WTA Knokke-Heist =

Defunct tennis tournament
- Tour: WTA Tour
- Founded: 1999
- Abolished: 2002
- Editions: 4
- Location: Knokke, Belgium (1999–2001); Brussels, Belgium (2002)
- Category: Tier IVa (1999); Tier IV (2000–2002)
- Surface: Clay / outdoor

The WTA Knokke-Heist, also known by its sponsored name Sanex Trophy, was a women's tennis tournament played on outdoor clay courts in Knokke-Heist, Belgium. As a Tier IVa and Tier IV category event it was part of the WTA Tour. The last edition of the tournament was held in Brussels and named French Community Championships.

== Past finals ==
=== Singles ===
Year	Champion	Runner-up	Score
1999	(Spain) María Sánchez Lorenzo	(Czech Republic) Denisa Chládková	6–7^{(2–7)}, 6–4, 6–2
2000	(Israel) Anna Smashnova	(Belgium) Dominique van Roost	6–2, 7–5
2001	(Uzbekistan) Iroda Tulyaganova	(Spain) Gala León García	6–2, 6–3
2002	(Switzerland) Myriam Casanova	(Spain) Arantxa Sánchez	4–6, 6–2, 6–1

=== Doubles ===
Year	Champions	Runners-up	Score
1999	(Czech Republic) Eva Martincová (Germany) Elena Wagner	(Russia) Evgenia Koulikovskaya (Federal Republic of Yugoslavia) Sandra Naćuk	3–6, 6–3, 6–3
2000	(Italy) Giulia Casoni (Uzbekistan) Iroda Tulyaganova	(Australia) Catherine Barclay (Denmark) Eva Dyrberg	2–6, 6–4, 6–4
2001	(Spain) Virginia Ruano Pascual (Spain) Magüi Serna	(Romania) Ruxandra Dragomir (Romania) Andreea Ehritt-Vanc	6–4, 6–3
2002	(Austria) Barbara Schwartz (Germany) Jasmin Wöhr	(Italy) Tathiana Garbin (Spain) Arantxa Sánchez	6–2, 0–6, 6–4

== See also ==
- Belgian Open – women's tournament (1987–2001)
