= Iroda Tulyaganova =

Uzbekistani tennis player (born 1982)

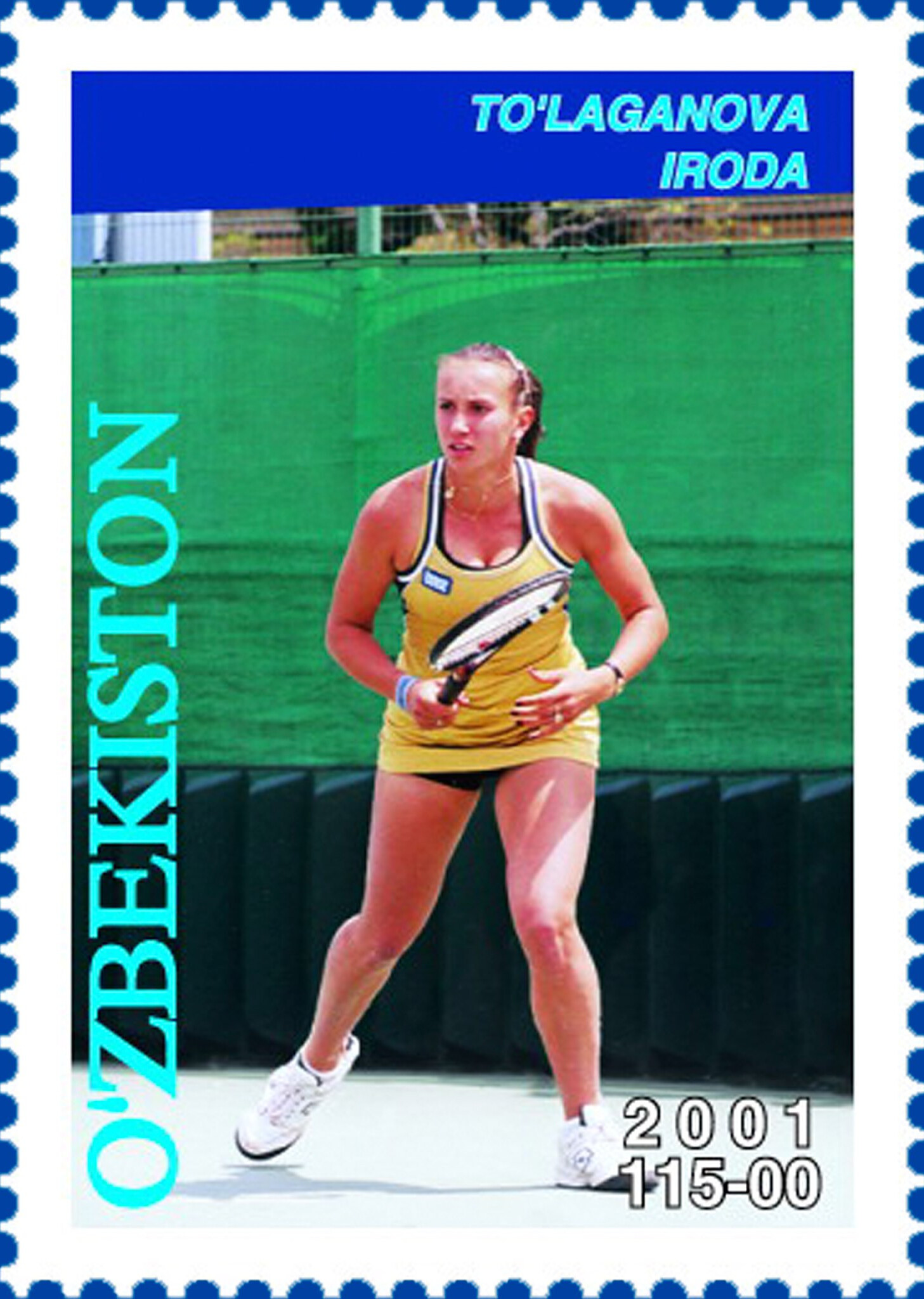
- Tulyaganova on a 2001 Uzbekistan stamp
- Country (sports): Uzbekistan
- Residence: Tashkent, Uzbekistan
- Born: 7 January 1982 (age 44) Tashkent, Uzbek SSR, Soviet Union
- Height: 1.70 m (5 ft 7 in)
- Turned pro: 1999
- Retired: 2010
- Plays: Right (two–handed backhand)
- Prize money: $973,334

Singles
- Career record: 205–142
- Career titles: 3 WTA, 3 ITF
- Highest ranking: No. 16 (17 June 2002)

Grand Slam singles results
- Australian Open: 3R (2002)
- French Open: 3R (2002)
- Wimbledon: 3R (2001)
- US Open: 2R (2000)

Doubles
- Career record: 102–91
- Career titles: 4 WTA, 4 ITF
- Highest ranking: No. 28 (23 September 2002)

Grand Slam doubles results
- Australian Open: 1R (2001, 2002)
- French Open: 3R (2003)
- Wimbledon: 2R (2002)
- US Open: 3R (2002)
Medal record
Asian Games
Gold medal – first place	2002 Busan	Singles
Bronze medal – third place	2002 Busan	Mixed doubles

Iroda Tulyaganova (Uzbek: Ирода Тўлаганов, romanized: Iroda To'laganova; born 7 January 1982) is a former professional tennis player from Uzbekistan.

Tulyaganova had a career-high WTA rankings of 16 in singles (reached in June 2002) and 28 in doubles (September 2002). She won three singles titles and four doubles titles on the WTA Tour.

Tulyaganova retired from professional tennis in 2010.

== Career ==
She returned to the main tour in 2006 after a long injury absence, and in Kolkata in September 2006, she reached the semifinals as a qualifier, leaping more than 120 places in the rankings to No. 222 after her success. The following week, she reached the final of her home event in Tashkent, beating a string of players including top 60-ranked Olga Poutchkova. She also won the women's singles gold medal in the 2002 Asian Games in Busan by defeating Tamarine Tanasugarn of Thailand, and the mixed-doubles bronze medal in the same event.

== WTA Tour finals ==
=== Singles: 7 (3 titles, 4 runner-ups) ===
Legend
Tier I (0–0)
Tier II (0–0)
Tier III, IV & V (3–4)

Result	W–L	Date	Tournament	Surface	Opponent	Score
Win	1–0	Jun 2000	Tashkent, Uzbekistan	Hard	(Italy) Francesca Schiavone	6–3, 2–6, 6–3
Loss	1–1	Oct 2000	Shanghai, China	Hard	(United States) Meghann Shaughnessy	6–7^{(2–7)}, 5–7
Win	2–1	Jul 2001	Vienna, Austria	Clay	(Switzerland) Patty Schnyder	6–3, 6–2
Win	3–1	Jul 2001	Knokke-Heist, Belgium	Clay	(Spain) Gala León García	6–2, 6–3
Loss	3–2	Jun 2002	Vienna, Austria	Clay	(Israel) Anna Smashnova	4–6, 1–6
Loss	3–3	Feb 2003	Hyderabad, India	Hard	(Thailand) Tamarine Tanasugarn	4–6, 4–6
Loss	3–4	Oct 2006	Tashkent, Uzbekistan	Hard	(China) Sun Tiantian	2–6, 4–6

=== Doubles: 7 (4 titles, 3 runner-ups) ===
Legend
Tier I (0–0)
Tier II (0–1)
Tier III, IV & V (4–2)

Result	W–L	Date	Tournament	Surface	Partner	Opponents	Score
Loss	0–1	May 2000	Warsaw, Poland	Clay	(Ukraine) Anna Zaporozhanova	(Italy) Tathiana Garbin (Slovakia) Janette Husárová	3–6, 1–6
Loss	0–2	Jun 2000	Tashkent, Uzbekistan	Hard	(Ukraine) Anna Zaporozhanova	(China) Li Na (China) Li Ting	6–3, 2–6, 4–6
Win	1–2	Jul 2000	Knokke-Heist, Belgium	Clay	(Italy) Giulia Casoni	(Australia) Catherine Barclay (Denmark) Eva Dyrberg	2–6, 6–4, 6–4
Loss	1–3	Feb 2001	Tokyo, Japan	Hard	(Russia) Anna Kournikova	(United States) Lisa Raymond (Australia) Rennae Stubbs	6–7^{(5–7)}, 6–2, 6–7^{(6–8)}
Win	2–3	May 2001	Strasbourg, France	Clay	(Italy) Silvia Farina Elia	(South Africa) Amanda Coetzer (United States) Lori McNeil	6–1, 7–6^{(7–0)}
Win	3–3	Nov 2001	Pattaya City, Thailand	Hard	(Sweden) Åsa Carlsson	(South Africa) Liezel Huber (Indonesia) Wynne Prakusya	4–6, 6–3, 6–3
Win	4–3	Feb 2003	Hyderabad, India	Hard	(Russia) Elena Likhovtseva	(Russia) Evgenia Kulikovskaya (Belarus) Tatiana Poutchek	6–4, 6–4

== ITF Circuit finals ==
$100,000 tournaments
$75,000 tournaments
$50,000 tournaments
$25,000 tournaments
$10,000 tournaments

=== Singles (3–2) ===
Result	No.	Date	Tournament	Surface	Opponent	Score
Win	1.	9 May 1999	Seoul, South Korea	Clay	(Japan) Shiho Hisamatsu	6–2, 6–2
Win	2.	3 October 1999	Seoul, South Korea	Hard	(Thailand) Tamarine Tanasugarn	6–0, 6–2
Win	3.	19 April 2000	Cagnes-sur-Mer, France	Hard	(Italy) Giulia Casoni	6–2, 6–3
Loss	4.	4 June 2006	Galatina, Italy	Clay	(Romania) Corina-Claudia Corduneanu	3–6, 4–6
Loss	5.	6 November 2006	Shenzhen, China	Hard	(China) Yuan Meng	6–4, 5–7, 1–6

=== Doubles (4–4) ===
Result	No.	Date	Tournament	Surface	Partner	Opponents	Score
Win	1.	7 November 1998	Moulins, France	Hard (i)	(Switzerland) Diane Asensio	(Netherlands) Debby Haak (Netherlands) Andrea van den Hurk	7–5, 2–6, 6–2
Win	2.	15 November 1998	Le Havre, France	Clay	(Belgium) Cindy Schuurmans	(France) Chloé Carlotti (France) Stéphanie Foretz	6–2, 7–5
Loss	3.	22 November 1998	Deauville, France	Carpet (i)	(Bulgaria) Lubomira Bacheva	(France) Emmanuelle Curutchet (France) Samantha Schoeffel	1–6, 6–2, 6–7
Win	4.	7 February 1999	Istanbul, Turkey	Hard (i)	(Ukraine) Tatiana Perebiynis	(Belarus) Nadejda Ostrovskaya (Switzerland) Aliénor Tricerri	6–3, 6–4
Win	5.	9 May 1999	Seoul, South Korea	Clay	(France) Samantha Schoeffel	(South Korea) Choi Young-ja (South Korea) Kim Eun-sook	6–3, 4–6, 6–4
Loss	6.	10 April 2000	Cagnes-sur-Mer, France	Hard (i)	(Ukraine) Anna Zaporozhanova	(Germany) Angelika Bachmann (Italy) Giulia Casoni	5–7, 1–6
Loss	7.	5 November 2006	Shanghai, China	Hard	(Uzbekistan) Akgul Amanmuradova	(China) Ji Chunmei (China) Sun Shengnan	4–6, 5–7
Loss	8.	5 November 2006	Shenzhen, China	Hard	(Uzbekistan) Akgul Amanmuradova	(Chinese Taipei) Hsieh Su-wei (Russia) Alla Kudryavtseva	0–2 ret.
