= 1998 Páginas Amarillas Open – Singles =

Singles
- 1998 Páginas Amarillas Open
- 1997 Champion: (Czech Republic) Jana Novotná

Final
- Champion: (Switzerland) Patty Schnyder
- Runner-up: (Belgium) Dominique Van Roost
- Score: 3–6, 6–4, 6–0

Events
Singles	Doubles
- Páginas Amarillas Open

Jana Novotná was the defending champion but did not compete that year.

Patty Schnyder won in the final 3–6, 6–4, 6–0 against Dominique Van Roost.

== Seeds ==
A champion seed is indicated in bold text while text in italics indicates the round in which that seed was eliminated. The top two seeds received a bye to the second round.

1. (France) Sandrine Testud (semifinals)
2. (Belgium) Dominique Van Roost (final)
3. (Switzerland) **Patty Schnyder (champion)**
4. (Austria) Barbara Schett (semifinals)
5. (Spain) Virginia Ruano Pascual (first round)
6. (Argentina) Florencia Labat (first round)
7. (Spain) Magüi Serna (quarterfinals)
8. (United States) Kimberly Po (second round)

== Draw ==
Key

- Q = Qualifier
- WC = Wild card
- LL = Lucky loser
- Alt = Alternate
- ITF = ITF entry
- PR = Protected ranking
- SR = Special ranking
- SE = Special exempt
- JE = Junior exempt
- JR = Junior Accelerator Programme entrant
- CO = College Accelerator Programme entrant
- NG = Next Gen Accelerator Program entrant
- w/o = Walkover
- r = Retired
- d = Defaulted

=== Final ===
Final
3	(Switzerland) **Patty Schnyder**	3	**6**	**6**
2	(Belgium) Dominique Van Roost	**6**	4	0

=== Section 1 ===
First round
Q	(Spain) N Montero	5	1
(Spain) **M Sánchez Lorenzo**	**7**	**6**
Q	(Bulgaria) P Stoyanova	3	1
(United States) **C Rubin**	**6**	**6**
(Israel) **A Smashnova**	**7**	**7**
5	(Spain) V Ruano Pascual	6	5
3	(Switzerland) **P Schnyder**	**6**
(Puerto Rico) K Brandi	0	r
WC	(Spain) A Salas Lozano	5	3
(Germany) **M Babel**	**7**	**6**
(Italy) **L Golarsa**	**6**	**6**
(Czech Republic) D Chládková	1	1
(Japan) Y Yoshida	1	4
7	(Spain) **M Serna**	**6**	**6**

Second round
1	(France) **S Testud**	**6**	**6**
(Spain) M Sánchez Lorenzo	4	4
(United States) **C Rubin**	3	**6**	**6**
(Israel) A Smashnova	**6**	3	2
3	(Switzerland) **P Schnyder**	4	**6**	**6**
(Germany) M Babel	**6**	0	2
(Italy) L Golarsa	3	0
7	(Spain) **M Serna**	**6**	**6**

Quarterfinals
1	(France) **S Testud**	**6**	**6**
(United States) C Rubin	4	3
3	(Switzerland) **P Schnyder**	3	**7**	**6**
7	(Spain) M Serna	**6**	6	4

Semifinals
1	(France) S Testud	4	5
3	(Switzerland) **P Schnyder**	**6**	**7**

=== Section 2 ===
First round
6	(Argentina) F Labat	2	5
(United States) **T Snyder**	**6**	**7**
Q	(Italy) **T Garbin**	**7**	**6**
(Australia) N Pratt	5	3
WC	(Germany) **J Kandarr**	2	**6**	**6**
(Spain) C Torrens Valero	**6**	4	1
(Russia) E Makarova	3	1
4	(Austria) **B Schett**	**6**	**6**
8	(United States) **K Po**	2	**6**	**6**
(Canada) P Hy-Boulais	**6**	4	1
(Austria) B Schwartz	1	2
Q	(Netherlands) **K Boogert**	**6**	**6**
(Australia) R McQuillan	4	4
(Spain) **G León García**	**6**	**6**

Second round
(United States) **T Snyder**	**7**	**6**
Q	(Italy) T Garbin	5	3
WC	(Germany) J Kandarr	2	6
4	(Austria) **B Schett**	**6**	**7**
8	(United States) K Po	**6**	0	2
Q	(Netherlands) **K Boogert**	4	**6**	**6**
(Spain) G León García	5	1
2	(Belgium) **D Van Roost**	**7**	**6**

Quarterfinals
(United States) T Snyder	2	2
4	(Austria) **B Schett**	**6**	**6**
Q	(Netherlands) K Boogert	0	6
2	(Belgium) **D Van Roost**	**6**	**7**

Semifinals
4	(Austria) B Schett	2	2
2	(Belgium) **D Van Roost**	**6**	**6**
