= 1998 Páginas Amarillas Open – Doubles =

Doubles
- 1998 Páginas Amarillas Open
- 1997 Champions: (United States) Mary Joe Fernández (Spain) Arantxa Sánchez Vicario

Final
- Champions: (Argentina) Florencia Labat (Belgium) Dominique Van Roost
- Runners-up: (Australia) Rachel McQuillan (Australia) Nicole Pratt
- Score: 6–3, 6–1

Events
Singles	Doubles
← 1997 ·	Páginas Amarillas Open	· 1999 →

Mary Joe Fernández and Arantxa Sánchez Vicario were the defending champions but did not compete that year.

Florencia Labat and Dominique Van Roost won in the final 6–3, 6–1 against Rachel McQuillan and Nicole Pratt.

== Seeds ==
Champion seeds are indicated in bold text while text in italics indicates the round in which those seeds were eliminated.

1. (United States) Debbie Graham / (United States) Kimberly Po (quarterfinals)
2. (Argentina) **Florencia Labat** / (Belgium) **Dominique Van Roost (champions)**
3. (Australia) Rachel McQuillan / (Australia) Nicole Pratt (final)
4. (Germany) Meike Babel / (Italy) Laura Golarsa (quarterfinals)

== Draw ==
=== Key ===
- Q = Qualifier
- WC = Wild card
- LL = Lucky loser
- Alt = Alternate
- SE = Special exempt
- PR = Protected ranking
- ITF = ITF entry
- JE = Junior exempt
- w/o = Walkover
- r = Retired
- d = Defaulted
- SR = Special ranking

First round
1	(United States) **D Graham** (United States) **K Po**	**6**	**6**
(United Kingdom) H Crook (United Kingdom) V Davies	3	2
(Spain) **G León García** (Spain) **C Torrens Valero**	3	**6**	**7**
(Australia) L Pleming (United States) A Wunderlich	**6**	1	5
3	(Australia) **R McQuillan** (Australia) **N Pratt**	**7**	**6**
(Argentina) M-F Landa (Hungary) K Marosi	6	1
(Germany) C Schneider (Slovenia) K Srebotnik	3	6
Q	(Germany) **J Kandarr** (Russia) **E Makarova**	**6**	**7**
(Spain) **M Escobar** (Spain) **M Ramón Climent**	**6**	**6**
(United States) T Snyder (Bulgaria) P Stoyanova	4	3
(Argentina) B Fulco-Villella (United States) M Mazzotta	1	2
4	(Germany) **M Babel** (Italy) **L Golarsa**	**6**	**6**
(Spain) A Salas Lozano (Spain) E Salvador	2	4
(Hungary) **V Csurgo** (Japan) **Y Yoshida**	**6**	**6**
(Argentina) M Paz (Spain) M Serna	3	4
2	(Argentina) **F Labat** (Belgium) **D Van Roost**	**6**	**6**

Quarterfinals
1	(United States) D Graham (United States) K Po	5	4
(Spain) **G León García** (Spain) **C Torrens Valero**	**7**	**6**
3	(Australia) **R McQuillan** (Australia) **N Pratt**	**6**	**6**
Q	(Germany) J Kandarr (Russia) E Makarova	1	4
(Spain) **M Escobar** (Spain) **M Ramón Climent**	**6**	**6**
4	(Germany) M Babel (Italy) L Golarsa	2	3
(Hungary) V Csurgo (Japan) Y Yoshida	3	4
2	(Argentina) **F Labat** (Belgium) **D Van Roost**	**6**	**6**

Semifinals
(Spain) G León García (Spain) C Torrens Valero	6	2
3	(Australia) **R McQuillan** (Australia) **N Pratt**	**7**	**6**
(Spain) M Escobar (Spain) M Ramón Climent	3	2
2	(Argentina) **F Labat** (Belgium) **D Van Roost**	**6**	**6**

Final
3	(Australia) Rachel McQuillan (Australia) Nicole Pratt	3	1
2	(Argentina) **Florencia Labat** (Belgium) **Dominique Van Roost**	**6**	**6**
