= Marina Escobar =

Spanish tennis player (born 1977)

- Full name: Marina Escobar Martínez
- Country (sports): Spain
- Born: 2 February 1977 (age 48)
- Prize money: $29,555

Singles
- Highest ranking: No. 325 (24 August 1998)

Doubles
- Career titles: 5 ITF
- Highest ranking: No. 140 (26 October 1998)

Grand Slam doubles results
- Wimbledon: Q1 (1998)

Marina Escobar Martínez (born 2 February 1977) is a Spanish former professional tennis player.

== Biography ==
Escobar, who had a best singles ranking of 325, was most prominent as a doubles player, winning five ITF titles in the late 1990s. She reached a career high doubles ranking of 140 and took part in the qualifying draw for the 1998 Wimbledon Championships.

Her best performance on the WTA Tour came at the 1998 Madrid Open, where she partnered with Mariam Ramón Climent to make the doubles semi-finals.

In 2001, while attending the University of Málaga, she represented Spain at the Summer Universiade, held in Beijing.

== ITF finals ==
$25,000 tournaments
$10,000 tournaments

=== Singles: 1 (0–1) ===
Result	No.	Date	Tournament	Surface	Opponent	Score
Loss	1.	22 April 1996	Azeméis, Portugal	Hard	(Sweden) Kristina Triska	6–4, 1–6, 2–6

=== Doubles: 12 (5–7) ===
Result	No.	Date	Tournament	Surface	Partner	Opponents	Score
Loss	1.	29 January 1996	Mallorca, Spain	Clay	(Spain) Conchita Martinez Granados	(Spain) Rosa María Andrés Rodríguez (Spain) Laura García	7–5, 0–6, 2–6
Win	1.	23 June 1996	Camucia, Italy	Clay	(Spain) Eva Bes	(Italy) Katia Altilia (Italy) Paola Tampieri	6–4, 6–7, 6–2
Loss	2.	24 November 1996	Mallorca, Spain	Clay	(Spain) Eva Bes	(Czech Republic) Zuzana Lešenarová (Czech Republic) Lucie Steflová	6–3, 2–6, 3–6
Loss	3.	31 August 1997	Athens, Greece	Clay	(Spain) Rosa María Andrés Rodríguez	(Russia) Evgenia Kulikovskaya (Federal Republic of Yugoslavia) Sandra Načuk	4–6, 3–6
Win	2.	24 November 1997	Mallorca, Spain	Clay	(Spain) Rosa María Andrés Rodríguez	(Austria) Melanie Schnell (Hungary) Katalin Marosi	6–4, 6–2
Win	3.	3 May 1998	Guimarães, Portugal	Hard	(Spain) Paula Hermida	(Brazil) Bruna Colósio (Portugal) Cristina Correia	7–6, 6–4
Loss	4.	10 May 1998	Elvas, Portugal	Hard	(Spain) Paula Hermida	(Spain) Rosa María Andrés Rodríguez (Netherlands) Debby Haak	W/O
Win	4.	22 June 1998	Santander, Spain	Clay	(Spain) Lourdes Domínguez Lino	(Colombia) Juliana Garcia (Colombia) Mariana Mesa Pineda	6–1, 7–6^{(1)}
Loss	5.	28 February 1999	Faro, Portugal	Hard	(Netherlands) Debby Haak	(Czech Republic) Gabriela Chmelinová (Czech Republic) Olga Vymetálková	2–6, 6–3, 4–6
Win	5.	27 September 1999	Lerida, Spain	Clay	(Spain) Rocío González	(Croatia) Lana Miholcek (Netherlands) Susanne Trik	2–6, 7–6^{(2)}, 6–0
Loss	6.	4 October 1999	Girona, Spain	Clay	(Spain) Rocío González	(Sweden) Maria Wolfbrandt (Italy) Mara Santangelo	7–6^{(3)}, 1–6, 3–6
Loss	7.	31 July 2000	Vigo, Spain	Clay	(Spain) Regina Temez	(Spain) Patricia Aznar (Spain) Yolanda Clemot	2–6, 1–6
