= Paola Tampieri =

Italian tennis player

- Country (sports): Italy
- Born: 26 April 1975 (age 49)
- Prize money: $25,846

Singles
- Career record: 74–66
- Career titles: 1 ITF
- Highest ranking: No. 256 (11 July 1994)

Doubles
- Career record: 17–33
- Highest ranking: No. 406 (8 June 1992)

Paola Tampieri (born 26 April 1975) is an Italian former professional tennis player.

Tampieri competed on the professional tour in the 1990s and had a best singles world ranking of 256. She was a main draw qualifier at the 1992 Italian Open and won an ITF title at Orbetello in 1996.

== ITF finals ==
=== Singles: 1 (1–1) ===
Result	No.	Date	Tournament	Surface	Opponent	Score
Loss	1.	29 August 1993	Lecce, Italy	Clay	(Italy) Gabriella Boschiero	3–6, 4–6
Win	2.	30 June 1996	Orbetello, Italy	Clay	(Romania) Andreea Ehritt-Vanc	6–1, 7–6^{(2)}

=== Doubles: 1 (0–1) ===
Result	No.	Date	Tournament	Surface	Partner	Opponents	Score
Loss	1.	23 June 1996	Camucia, Italy	Clay	(Italy) Katia Altilia	(Spain) Eva Bes (Spain) Marina Escobar	4–6, 7–6, 2–6
