= Eva Bes =

Spanish tennis player (born 1973)

- Full name: Eva Bes Ostáriz
- Country (sports): Spain
- Born: 14 January 1973 (age 52); Zaragoza, Spain
- Height: 1.70 m (5 ft 7 in)
- Turned pro: 1989
- Retired: 2003
- Plays: Right-handed (two-handed backhand)
- Prize money: $387,864

Singles
- Career record: 295–224
- Career titles: 6 ITF
- Highest ranking: No. 90 (4 March 2002)

Grand Slam singles results
- Australian Open: 1R (2002)
- French Open: 3R (2002)
- Wimbledon: 1R (2002)
- US Open: 2R (2001)

Doubles
- Career record: 248–142
- Career titles: 29 ITF
- Highest ranking: No. 71 (22 May 2000)

Grand Slam doubles results
- Australian Open: 1R (1999, 2000, 2001, 2002)
- French Open: 2R (2000, 2001, 2002)
- Wimbledon: 2R (2001)
- US Open: 1R (1999, 2000, 2001, 2002)

Eva Bes Ostáriz (born 14 January 1973) is a former professional tennis player from Spain.

Over her career, she won a total of 35 titles (29 in doubles) on the ITF Circuit. On 4 March 2002, she reached a career-high singles ranking of world No. 90. On 22 May 2000, she peaked at No. 71 in the WTA doubles rankings.

As a junior, Bes was the 1991 French Open girls' doubles champion.

She retired from professional tennis in 2003.

== Personal ==
Coached by her brother, Pablo Bes, Eva's favorite surface has been clay; best shot is forehand. Father Rafael is a doctor; mother, MaPilar, is a housewife; Eva has three brothers, Rafael, Pablo and Jorge, two of whom are tennis coaches. She admired Gabriel Urpi, her first coach. Favorite tournament has been Roland Garros.

== WTA Tour finals ==
=== Doubles: 2 (2 runner-ups) ===
Legend
Grand Slam tournaments
Premier M & Premier 5
Premier
International (0–2)

| Result | Date | Tournament | Surface | Partner | Opponents | Score |
|---|---|---|---|---|---|---|
| Loss | Jun 1999 | Tashkent Open, Uzbekistan | Clay | (Spain) Gisela Riera | (Russia) Evgenia Kulikovskaya (Austria) Patricia Wartusch | 6–7^{(3–7)}, 0–6 |
| Loss | Aug 2002 | Nordic Light Open, Sweden | Hard | (Spain) María José Martínez Sánchez | (Russia) Svetlana Kuznetsova (Spain) Arantxa Sánchez Vicario | 3–6, 7–6^{(7–5)}, 3–6 |

== ITF Circuit finals ==
$75,000 tournaments
$50,000 tournaments
$25,000 tournaments
$10,000 tournaments

=== Singles: 14 (6–8) ===
| Result | No. | Date | Tournament | Surface | Opponent | Score |
|---|---|---|---|---|---|---|
| Loss | 1. | 26 March 1990 | ITF Madrid, Spain | Clay | (Spain) Ninoska Souto | 3–6, 0–6 |
| Loss | 2. | 28 May 1990 | ITF Lisbon, Portugal | Clay | (Spain) Ana Segura | 4–6, 0–6 |
| Loss | 3. | 5 August 1991 | ITF Vigo, Spain | Clay | (France) Catherine Mothes-Jobkel | 3–6, 0–6 |
| Win | 4. | 17 February 1992 | ITF Barcelona, Spain | Clay | (Netherlands) Claire Wegink | 7–6, 6–4 |
| Loss | 5. | 11 March 1996 | ITF Zaragoza, Spain | Clay | (Spain) Conchita Martínez Granados | 6–3, 1–6, 3–6 |
| Loss | 6. | 30 September 1996 | ITF Lerida, Spain | Clay | (Spain) Ana Alcázar | 3–6, 6–1, 2–6 |
| Win | 7. | 18 November 1996 | ITF Mallorca, Spain | Clay | (Spain) Laura Pena | 6–3, 7–5 |
| Win | 8. | 23 June 1997 | ITF Velp, Netherlands | Clay | (Netherlands) Jolanda Mens | 6–4, 6–7^{(2–7)}, 7–5 |
| Win | 9. | 30 June 1997 | ITF Hoorn, Netherlands | Clay | (Netherlands) Yvette Basting | 6–2, 6–3 |
| Loss | 10. | 22 September 1997 | ITF Thessaloniki, Greece | Grass | (France) Amélie Mauresmo | 0–6, 0–6 |
| Loss | 11. | 1 December 1997 | ITF Mallorca, Spain | Clay | (Spain) Conchita Martínez Granados | 3–6, 7–5, 3–6 |
| Loss | 12. | 26 July 1999 | ITF Bytom, Poland | Clay | (Austria) Patricia Wartusch | 2–6, 4–6 |
| Win | 13. | 17 July 2000 | ITF Fontanafredda, Italy | Clay | (Italy) Gloria Pizzichini | 6–4, 6–1 |
| Win | 14. | 24 June 2001 | ITF Gorizia, Italy | Clay | (Romania) Raluca Sandu | 6–0, 1–6, 6–3 |

=== Doubles: 49 (29–20) ===
| Result | No. | Date | Tournament | Surface | Partner | Opponents | Score |
|---|---|---|---|---|---|---|---|
| Loss | 1. | 11 September 1989 | ITF Pamplona, Spain | Hard | (Spain) Virginia Ruano Pascual | (Brazil) Cláudia Chabalgoity (Spain) Ana Segura | 3–6, 0–6 |
| Loss | 2. | 16 April 1990 | ITF Marsa, Malta | Clay | (Spain) Silvia Ramón-Cortés | (Soviet Union) Viktoria Milvidskaia (Soviet Union) Anna Mirza | 2–6, 6–7 |
| Win | 3. | 14 May 1990 | ITF Cascais, Portugal | Clay | (Spain) Virginia Ruano Pascual | (Netherlands) Simone Schilder (Netherlands) Caroline Vis | 3–6, 6–2, 6–1 |
| Loss | 4. | 30 July 1990 | ITF Vigo, Spain | Clay | (Spain) Virginia Ruano Pascual | (Spain) María José Llorca (Spain) Ana Segura | 3–6, 4–6 |
| Win | 5. | 5 November 1990 | ITF Lleida, Spain | Clay | (Spain) Virginia Ruano Pascual | (Spain) Ana Larrakoetxea (Spain) Silvia Ramón-Cortés | 6–2, 1–6, 7–5 |
| Loss | 6. | 18 March 1991 | ITF Alicante, Spain | Clay | (Spain) Virginia Ruano Pascual | (Spain) Rosa Bielsa (Spain) Silvia Ramón-Cortés | 3–6, 6–0, 5–7 |
| Win | 7. | 8 April 1991 | ITF Turin, Italy | Clay | (Spain) Virginia Ruano Pascual | (Czechoslovakia) Lucie Steflová (Czechoslovakia) Helena Vildová | 6–7, 6–1, 6–3 |
| Win | 8. | 6 May 1991 | ITF Porto, Portugal | Clay | (Spain) Virginia Ruano Pascual | (South Africa) Mariaan de Swardt (Israel) Yael Segal | 6–3, 7–5 |
| Win | 9. | 5 August 1991 | ITF Vigo, Spain | Clay | (Spain) Virginia Ruano Pascual | (Finland) Anne Aallonen (United Kingdom) Belinda Borneo | 7–6^{(8–6)}, 7–5 |
| Win | 10. | 20 July 1992 | ITF Bilbao, Spain | Clay | (Spain) Virginia Ruano Pascual | (United States) Jessica Emmons (Australia) Clare Thompson | 6–2, 6–4 |
| Loss | 11. | 22 February 1993 | ITF Valencia, Spain | Clay | (Spain) Virginia Ruano Pascual | (Netherlands) Gaby Coorengel (Netherlands) Amy van Buuren | 4–6, 0–6 |
| Win | 12. | 26 April 1993 | ITF Porto, Portugal | Clay | (Spain) Eva Jiménez | (Spain) Vanessa Castellano (Spain) Alicia Ortuño | 5–7, 6–1, 6–3 |
| Win | 13. | 23 May 1994 | ITF Barcelona, Spain | Clay | (Spain) Silvia Ramón-Cortés | (Netherlands) Maaike Koutstaal (Australia) Kirrily Sharpe | 6–1, 6–3 |
| Win | 14. | 13 March 1995 | ITF Zaragoza, Spain | Clay | (Spain) Patricia Aznar | (Czech Republic) Monika Kratochvílová (Slovakia) Martina Nedelková | 6–4, 2–6, 6–2 |
| Win | 15. | 12 June 1995 | ITF Barcelona, Spain | Clay | (Spain) Patricia Aznar | (Argentina) Laura Montalvo (Spain) Silvia Ramón-Cortés | 6–3, 2–6, 6–4 |
| Loss | 16. | 4 September 1995 | ITF Cáceres, Spain | Clay | (Spain) Patricia Aznar | (Spain) Alicia Ortuño (Spain) Cristina Torrens Valero | 2–6, 3–6 |
| Loss | 17. | 2 October 1995 | ITF Lerida, Spain | Clay | (Spain) Patricia Aznar | (France) Karine Quentrec (Spain) Virginia Ruano Pascual | 6–7, 0–6 |
| Win | 18. | 18 February 1996 | ITF Cali, Colombia | Clay | (Spain) Paula Hermida | (Brazil) Miriam D'Agostini (Paraguay) Larissa Schaerer | 6–3, 2–6, 6–3 |
| Loss | 19. | 17 March 1996 | ITF Zaragoza, Spain | Clay | (Spain) Laura García-Pacual | (Spain) Nuria Montero (Spain) Elisa Penalvo | 6–3, 3–6, 5–7 |
| Win | 20. | 23 June 1996 | ITF Camucia, Italy | Clay | (Spain) Marina Escobar | (Italy) Katia Altilia (Italy) Paola Tampieri | 6–4, 6–7, 6–2 |
| Loss | 21. | 24 November 1996 | ITF Mallorca, Spain | Clay | (Spain) Marina Escobar | (Czech Republic) Zuzana Lešenarová (Czech Republic) Lucie Steflová | 6–3, 2–6, 3–6 |
| Loss | 22. | 25 May 1997 | ITF Zaragoza, Spain | Clay | (Spain) Lourdes Domínguez Lino | (Netherlands) Kim de Weille (Hungary) Nóra Köves | 6–7^{(4–7)}, 4–6 |
| Win | 23. | 13 July 1997 | ITF Amersfoort, Netherlands | Clay | (Netherlands) Debby Haak | (Australia) Anna Klim (Czech Republic) Zuzana Lešenarová | 4–3 ret. |
| Loss | 24. | 4 August 1997 | ITF Carthage, Tunisia | Clay | (Spain) Elena Salvador | (Spain) Alicia Ortuño (Slovakia) Zuzana Váleková | 6–4, 4–6, 4–6 |
| Loss | 25. | 1 September 1997 | ITF Spoleto, Italy | Clay | (Spain) Ana Alcázar | (Czech Republic) Kateřina Kroupová-Šišková (Czech Republic) Jana Pospíšilová | 1–6, 0–6 |
| Loss | 26. | 22 March 1998 | ITF Reims, France | Clay | (Spain) Conchita Martínez Granados | (Netherlands) Amanda Hopmans (Belgium) Daphne van de Zande | 4–6, 3–6 |
| Loss | 27. | 20 July 1998 | ITF Valladolid, Spain | Hard | (Spain) Rosa María Andrés Rodríguez | (Spain) Gisela Riera (Tunisia) Selima Sfar | 6–7^{(5–7)}, 6–7^{(3–7)} |
| Win | 28. | 27 July 1998 | ITF Pamplona, Spain | Hard (i) | (Netherlands) Amanda Hopmans | (Germany) Meike Fröhlich (Tunisia) Selima Sfar | w/o |
| Win | 29. | 21 September 1998 | ITF Bucharest, Romania | Clay | (Spain) Rosa María Andrés Rodríguez | (Czech Republic) Lenka Cenková (Austria) Karin Kschwendt | 4–6, 7–6^{(8–6)}, 6–0 |
| Loss | 30. | 19 October 1998 | ITF Montevideo, Uruguay | Clay | (Argentina) María Fernanda Landa | (Argentina) Laura Montalvo (Argentina) Paola Suarez | 2–6, 2–6 |
| Win | 31. | 2 November 1998 | ITF Mogi das Cruzes, Brazil | Clay | (Argentina) María Fernanda Landa | (Argentina) Luciana Masante (Spain) Alicia Ortuño | 4–6, 6–2, 6–2 |
| Loss | 32. | 16 November 1998 | ITF Buenos Aires, Argentina | Clay | (Argentina) María Fernanda Landa | (Netherlands) Seda Noorlander (Slovenia) Katarina Srebotnik | 6–7^{(5–7)}, 3–6 |
| Loss | 33. | 24 May 1999 | ITF Budapest, Hungary | Clay | (Spain) Mariam Ramón Climent | (Italy) Alice Canepa (Belarus) Tatiana Poutchek | 3–6, 0–6 |
| Win | 34. | 4 July 1999 | ITF Mont-de-Marsan, France | Clay | (Argentina) María Fernanda Landa | (Colombia) Giana Gutiérrez (Argentina) Romina Ottoboni | 6–4, 6–4 |
| Win | 35. | 25 July 1999 | ITF Ettenheim, Germany | Clay | (Spain) Lourdes Domínguez Lino | (Austria) Patricia Wartusch (Germany) Jasmin Wöhr | 7–5, 6–4 |
| Win | 36. | 1 August 1999 | ITF Bytom, Poland | Clay | (Poland) Magdalena Grzybowska | (Spain) Gisela Riera (Romania) Raluca Sandu | 6–4, 7–5 |
| Win | 37. | 20 March 2000 | ITF Taranto, Italy | Clay | (Spain) Gisela Riera | (France) Stéphanie Foretz (Italy) Antonella Serra Zanetti | 6–7^{(2–7)}, 6–2, 6–2 |
| Win | 38. | 17 April 2000 | ITF Gelos, France | Clay | (Spain) Marta Marrero | (Spain) Lourdes Domínguez Lino (Spain) Anabel Medina Garrigues | 6–3, 6–4 |
| Win | 39. | 15 May 2000 | ITF Porto, Portugal | Clay | (Spain) Gisela Riera | (Spain) Conchita Martínez Granados (Spain) Rosa María Andrés Rodríguez | 6–3, 6–3 |
| Winner | 40. | 3 July 2000 | ITF Mont-de-Marsan, France | Clay | (Spain) Alicia Ortuño | (Argentina) Eugenia Chialvo (Argentina) Jorgelina Cravero | 6–2, 6–2 |
| Loss | 41. | 24 July 2000 | ITF Liège, Belgium | Clay | (Spain) Gisela Riera | (Hungary) Virág Csurgó (Hungary) Petra Mandula | 6–7^{(3–7)}, 1–6 |
| Winner | 42. | 18 September 2000 | ITF Lecce, Italy | Clay | (Spain) Alicia Ortuño | (Germany) Angelika Rösch (Germany) Syna Schmidle | 6–4, 6–0 |
| Winner | 43. | 2 October 2000 | ITF Girona, Spain | Clay | (Spain) Lourdes Domínguez Lino | (Spain) Mariam Ramon Climent (Spain) Gisela Riera | 4–2, 5–4^{(5–3)}, 4–2 |
| Loss | 44. | 16 April 2001 | ITF Gelos, France | Clay | (Spain) Lourdes Domínguez Lino | (Germany) Vanessa Henke (Germany) Syna Schmidle | 2–6, 3–6 |
| Winner | 45. | 23 April 2001 | ITF Caserta, Italy | Clay | (Spain) Lourdes Domínguez Lino | (Spain) María José Martínez Sánchez (Spain) Gisela Riera | 6–1, 7–6^{(7–5)} |
| Winner | 46. | 30 April 2001 | ITF Taranto, Italy | Clay | (Argentina) Eugenia Chialvo | (Italy) Antonella Serra Zanetti (Italy) Roberta Vinci | 6–2, 1–6, 6–3 |
| Loss | 47. | 3 September 2001 | ITF Fano, Italy | Clay | (Spain) Gisela Riera | (Italy) Giulia Casoni (Hungary) Katalin Marosi | 3–6, 4–6 |
| Winner | 48. | 1 October 2001 | ITF Girona, Spain | Clay | (Spain) Lourdes Domínguez Lino | (Italy) Maria Elena Camerin (Spain) Nuria Llagostera Vives | 6–2, 4–6, 6–1 |
| Win | 49. | 22 September 2002 | ITF Biella, Italy | Clay | (Bulgaria) Lubomira Bacheva | (Spain) María José Martínez Sánchez (Spain) Anabel Medina Garrigues | 7–5, 2–6, 7–6^{(7–5)} |

== Junior Grand Slam finals ==
=== Girls' doubles (1–0) ===
| Outcome | Year | Championship | Surface | Partner | Opponents | Score |
|---|---|---|---|---|---|---|
| Winner | 1991 | French Open | Clay | (Argentina) Inés Gorrochategui | (Czechoslovakia) Zdeňka Málková (Czechoslovakia) Eva Martincová | 6–1, 6–3 |

== See also ==
- List of French Open champions
