= Marta Cano =

Spanish tennis player (born 1975)

- Country (sports): Spain
- Born: 27 September 1975 (age 49)
- Prize money: $21,609

Singles
- Career record: 84–78
- Career titles: 0
- Highest ranking: No. 356 (12 January 1998)

Doubles
- Career record: 62–44
- Career titles: 7 ITF
- Highest ranking: No. 213 (5 August 1996)

Marta Cano (born 27 September 1975) is a Spanish former professional tennis player.

Cano competed on the professional tour in the 1990s and reached a career high singles ranking of 356 in the world.

Her only WTA Tour main draw appearance came in doubles, at the 1997 Madrid Open. She had a best doubles ranking of 213 and won seven doubles titles on the ITF Women's Circuit.

== ITF finals ==
Legend
$25,000 tournaments
$10,000 tournaments

=== Singles: 3 (0–3) ===
Result	No.	Date	Tournament	Surface	Opponent	Score
Loss	1.	4 June 1995	ITF Sevilla, Spain	Clay	(Chile) Paula Cabezas	1–6, 3–6
Loss	2.	25 June 1995	ITF Elvas, Portugal	Hard	(Spain) Alicia Ortuño	6–4, 2–6, 6–7^{(3)}
Loss	3.	1 June 1997	ITF Barcelona, Spain	Clay	(Hungary) Katalin Marosi	2–6, 3–6

=== Doubles: 13 (7–6) ===
Result	No.	Date	Tournament	Surface	Partner	Opponents	Score
Loss	1.	30 January 1994	ITF Pontevedra, Spain	Carpet (i)	(Spain) Cristina de Subijana	(Slovakia) Patrícia Marková (Netherlands) Henriëtte van Aalderen	3–6, 2–6
Loss	2.	25 September 1994	ITF Marseille, France	Clay	(Spain) Cristina de Subijana	(France) Catherine Tanvier (Dominican Republic) Madeleine Sánchez	3–6, 2–6
Win	1.	8 May 1995	ITF Balaguer, Spain	Clay	(Spain) Nuria Montero	(Spain) Rosa María Pérez (Spain) Maria Sánchez Lorenzo	6–1, 6–2
Win	2.	14 May 1995	ITF Mollet, Spain	Clay	(Spain) Nuria Montero	(Argentina) Mariana Eberle (Brazil) Vanessa Menga	7–5, 6–4
Win	3.	4 June 1995	ITF Sevilla, Spain	Clay	(Spain) Nuria Montero	(Japan) Hiroko Mochizuki (Spain) Misumi Miyauchi	6–7^{(4)}, 6–4, 6–4
Win	4.	17 September 1995	ITF Marseille, France	Clay	(Spain) Nuria Montero	(France) Nathalie Callen (France) Patricia Mongauzi	6–4, 6–1
Win	5.	12 May 1996	ITF Santander, Spain	Clay	(Spain) Nuria Montero	(Portugal) Joana Pedroso (Spain) Ana Salas Lozano	6–4, 6–4
Win	6.	2 June 1996	ITF Barcelona, Spain	Clay	(Spain) Nuria Montero	(Austria) Désirée Leupold (Spain) Gisela Riera	7–5, 3–6, 6–1
Loss	3.	21 July 1996	ITF Bilbao, Spain	Clay	(Spain) Nuria Montero	(Spain) Alicia Ortuño (Argentina) Veronica Stele	3–6, 4–6
Loss	4.	1 December 1996	ITF Mallorca, Spain	Clay	(Spain) Nuria Montero	(Slovakia) Michaela Hasanová (Slovakia) Martina Nedelková	3–6, 5–7
Win	7.	11 May 1997	ITF Tortosa, Spain	Clay	(Spain) Nuria Montero	(Brazil) Miriam D'Agostini (Argentina) Veronica Stele	6–3, 1–6, 6–4
Loss	5.	14 September 1997	ITF Mollerusa, Spain	Clay	(Spain) Gala León García	(Spain) Patricia Aznar (Spain) Paula Hermida	7–5, 3–6, 3–6
Loss	6.	7 December 1997	ITF Mallorca, Spain	Clay	(Spain) Conchita Martínez Granados	(Hungary) Katalin Marosi (Austria) Melanie Schnell	4–6, 6–4, 5–7
