= Nuria Montero =

Spanish tennis player (born 1978)

- Country (sports): Spain
- Born: 8 October 1978 (age 46)
- Prize money: $21,157

Singles
- Career record: 77–58
- Career titles: 1 ITF
- Highest ranking: No. 297 (26 January 1998)

Doubles
- Career record: 74–32
- Career titles: 11 ITF
- Highest ranking: No. 193 (30 September 1996)

Nuria Montero (born 8 October 1978) is a Spanish former professional tennis player.

Montero reached a career-best singles ranking of 297 and made her only WTA Tour main-draw appearance as a qualifier at the 1998 Madrid Open. She was beaten in the first round by María Sánchez Lorenzo, after securing qualifying wins over Conchita Martínez Granados, Syna Schmidle and Alicia Ortuño, the latter in a walkover.

As a doubles player, Montero had a career-high ranking of 193, and won eleven titles on the ITF Circuit.

== ITF Circuit finals ==
Legend
$25,000 tournaments
$10,000 tournaments

=== Singles: 3 (1 title, 2 runner-ups) ===
Result	No.	Date	Tournament	Surface	Opponent	Score
Win	1.	11 May 1997	ITF Tortosa, Spain	Clay	(Argentina) Veronica Stele	6–3, 6–1
Loss	1.	13 July 1997	ITF Vigo, Spain	Clay	(Spain) Conchita Martínez Granados	2–6, 4–6
Loss	2.	14 September 1997	ITF Mollerussa, Spain	Clay	(Hungary) Kira Nagy	1–6, 0–6

=== Doubles: 14 (11 titles, 3 runner-ups) ===
Result	No.	Date	Tournament	Surface	Partner	Opponents	Score
Win	1.	8 May 1995	ITF Balaguer, Spain	Clay	(Spain) Marta Cano	(Spain) Rosa María Pérez (Spain) Maria Sánchez Lorenzo	6–1, 6–2
Win	2.	14 May 1995	ITF Mollet, Spain	Clay	(Spain) Marta Cano	(Argentina) Mariana Eberle (Brazil) Vanessa Menga	7–5, 6–4
Win	3.	4 June 1995	ITF Sevilla, Spain	Clay	(Spain) Marta Cano	(Japan) Hiroko Mochizuki (Spain) Misumi Miyauchi	6–7^{(4)}, 6–4, 6–4
Win	4.	17 September 1995	ITF Marseille, France	Clay	(Spain) Marta Cano	(France) Nathalie Callen (France) Patricia Mongauzi	6–4, 6–1
Win	5.	17 March 1996	ITF Zaragoza, Spain	Clay	(Spain) Elisa Penalvo	(Spain) Eva Bes (Spain) Laura García-Pacual	3–6, 6–3, 7–5
Win	6.	12 May 1996	ITF Santander, Spain	Clay	(Spain) Marta Cano	(Portugal) Joana Pedroso (Spain) Ana Salas Lozano	6–4, 6–4
Win	7.	2 June 1996	ITF Barcelona, Spain	Clay	(Spain) Marta Cano	(Austria) Désirée Leupold (Spain) Gisela Riera	7–5, 3–6, 6–1
Loss	1.	21 July 1996	ITF Bilbao, Spain	Clay	(Spain) Marta Cano	(Spain) Alicia Ortuño (Argentina) Veronica Stele	3–6, 4–6
Loss	2.	1 December 1996	ITF Mallorca, Spain	Clay	(Spain) Marta Cano	(Slovakia) Michaela Hasanová (Slovakia) Martina Nedelková	3–6, 5–7
Win	8.	4 May 1997	ITF Balaguer, Spain	Clay	(Spain) Lourdes Domínguez Lino	(Argentina) Celeste Contin (Spain) Conchita Martínez Granados	0–6, 6–2, 6–4
Win	9.	11 May 1997	ITF Tortosa, Spain	Clay	(Spain) Marta Cano	(Brazil) Miriam D'Agostini (Argentina) Veronica Stele	6–3, 1–6, 6–4
Win	10.	13 July 1997	ITF Vigo, Spain	Clay	(Spain) Lourdes Domínguez Lino	(Spain) Conchita Martínez Granados (Spain) Gisela Riera	6–3, 6–0
Win	11.	5 October 1997	ITF Lerida, Spain	Clay	(Spain) Lourdes Domínguez Lino	(Netherlands) Carlijn Buis (Spain) Noelia Serra	6–7^{(1)}, 6–2, 6–1
Loss	3.	12 October 1997	ITF Gerona, Spain	Clay	(Spain) Lourdes Domínguez Lino	(Spain) Conchita Martínez Granados (Spain) Gisela Riera	6–2, 3–6, 4–6
