= Patricia Aznar =

Spanish tennis player (born 1975)

- Country (sports): Spain
- Born: 19 February 1975 (age 50)
- Prize money: US$35,833

Singles
- Career record: 124–109
- Career titles: 0
- Highest ranking: No. 310 (15 January 1996)

Doubles
- Career record: 81–65
- Career titles: 8 ITF
- Highest ranking: No. 167 (27 November 1995)

Patricia Aznar (born 19 February 1975) is a Spanish former professional tennis player.

Aznar won eight titles during her career on the ITF Women's Circuit, all in doubles, which included a $50,000 tournament in Barcelona in 1995. She made her only WTA Tour main-draw appearance at the 1996 Madrid Open, partnering Eva Bes in the doubles.

== ITF finals ==
$50,000 tournaments
$25,000 tournaments
$10,000 tournaments

=== Singles: 4 (4 runner-ups) ===
Result	No.	Date	Tournament	Surface	Opponent	Score
Loss	1	6 March 1995	ITF Alicante, Spain	Clay	(Japan) Miho Saeki	5–7, 6–4, 2–6
Loss	2	29 April 1996	ITF Balaguer, Spain	Clay	(Spain) Ana Salas Lozano	2–6, 4–6
Loss	3	17 May 1998	ITF Tortosa, Spain	Clay	(Morocco) Bahia Mouhtassine	6–7, 2–6
Loss	4	22 June 1998	ITF Santander, Spain	Clay	(Spain) Lourdes Domínguez Lino	6–1, 3–6, 6–7^{(3)}

=== Doubles: 14 (8 titles, 6 runner-ups) ===
Result	No.	Date	Tournament	Surface	Partner	Opponents	Score
Win	1	13 March 1995	ITF Zaragoza, Spain	Clay	(Spain) Eva Bes	(Czech Republic) Monika Kratochvílová (Slovakia) Martina Nedelková	6–4, 2–6, 6–2
Loss	1	27 March 1995	ITF Alicante, Spain	Clay	(Spain) Elisa Peñalvo López	(Bulgaria) Teodora Nedeva (Japan) Miho Saeki	3–6, 1–6
Win	2	12 June 1995	ITF Barcelona, Spain	Clay	(Spain) Eva Bes	(Argentina) Laura Montalvo (Spain) Silvia Ramón-Cortés	6–3, 2–6, 6–4
Loss	2	4 September 1995	ITF Cáceres, Spain	Clay	(Spain) Eva Bes	(Spain) Alicia Ortuño (Spain) Cristina Torrens Valero	2–6, 3–6
Loss	3	2 October 1995	ITF Lerida, Spain	Clay	(Spain) Eva Bes	(France) Karine Quentrec (Spain) Virginia Ruano Pascual	6–7, 0–6
Loss	4	5 May 1996	ITF Balaguer, Spain	Clay	(Spain) Yolanda Clemot	(Federal Republic of Yugoslavia) Dragana Zarić (Greece) Ariadne Katsoulis	5–7, 4–6
Win	3	14 September 1997	ITF Madrid, Spain	Clay	(Spain) Paula Hermida	(Spain) Marta Cano (Spain) Gala León García	5–7, 6–3, 6–3
Win	4	20 October 1997	ITF Ceuta, Spain	Hard	(Spain) Alicia Ortuño	(Spain) Ainhoa Goñi (Spain) Yaiza Goñi	w/o
Win	5	11 May 1998	ITF Tortosa, Spain	Clay	(Spain) Cynthia Perez	(Spain) María José Martínez Sánchez (Spain) Anabel Medina Garrigues	6–0, 6–3
Win	6	28 September 1998	ITF Lerida, Spain	Clay	(Spain) Mariam Ramón Climent	(Denmark) Charlotte Aagaard (Denmark) Maria Rasmussen	6–2, 6–0
Loss	5	5 July 1999	ITF Vigo, Spain	Clay	(Spain) Ana Salas Lozano	(Spain) Lourdes Domínguez Lino (Spain) Anabel Medina Garrigues	5–7, 1–6
Loss	6	22 November 1999	ITF Mallorca, Spain	Clay	(Spain) Yolanda Clemot	(Czech Republic) Gabriela Chmelinová (Czech Republic) Petra Kučová	0–6, 3–6
Win	7	31 July 2000	ITF Vigo, Spain	Clay	(Spain) Yolanda Clemot	(Spain) Marina Escobar (Spain) Regina Temez	6–2, 6–1
Win	8	1 October 2000	ITF Lerida, Spain	Clay	(Spain) Bárbara Navarro	(Federal Republic of Yugoslavia) Ana Timotić (Germany) Caroline-Ann Basu	6–1, 6–3
