= Lourdes Domínguez Lino =

Spanish tennis player (born 1981)

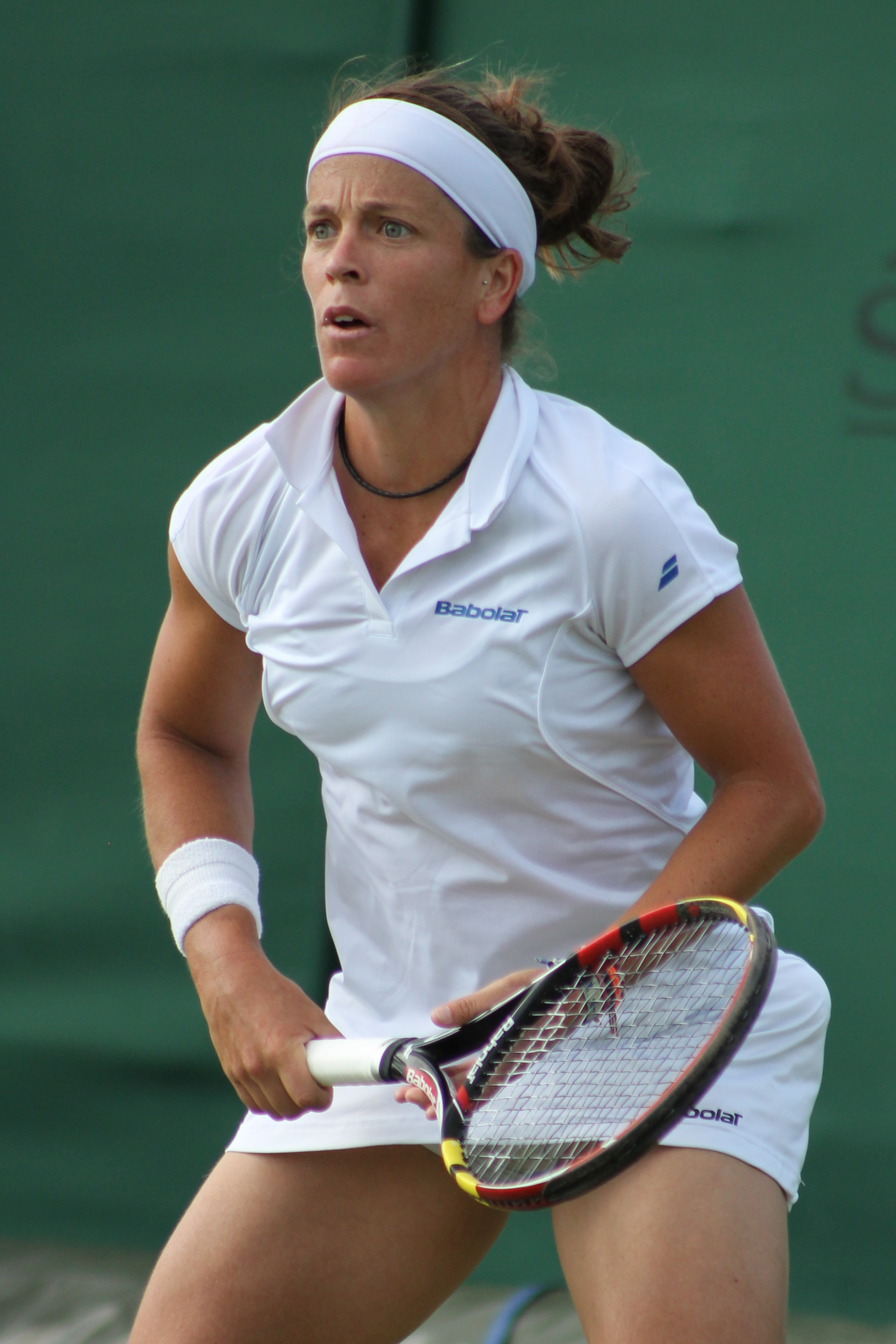
- Dominguez Lino at the 2015 Wimbledon Championships
- Country (sports): Spain
- Residence: Barcelona, Spain
- Born: 31 March 1981 (age 45) Pontevedra, Spain
- Height: 1.63 m (5 ft 4 in)
- Turned pro: 1996
- Retired: 2016
- Plays: Right-handed (one-handed backhand)
- Prize money: US$ 2,434,215

Singles
- Career record: 568–411
- Career titles: 2
- Highest ranking: No. 40 (11 September 2006)

Grand Slam singles results
- Australian Open: 2R (2007, 2009, 2011)
- French Open: 3R (2009)
- Wimbledon: 2R (2011, 2012, 2014)
- US Open: 3R (2010)

Doubles
- Career record: 377–215
- Career titles: 6
- Highest ranking: No. 45 (6 March 2006)

Grand Slam doubles results
- Australian Open: 2R (2006)
- French Open: 3R (2005)
- Wimbledon: 2R (2006, 2007, 2012)
- US Open: 1R (2000, 2001, 2005, 2006, 2007)

Team competitions
- Fed Cup: 7–8

Lourdes Domínguez Lino (Spanish pronunciation: [ˈluɾðes ðoˈmiŋɡeθ ˈlino]; (Note: In isolation, Domínguez is pronounced [doˈmiŋɡeθ].) born 31 March 1981) is a former tennis player from Spain. She reached career-high rankings of world No. 40 in singles and 45 in doubles.

== Biography ==
=== Tennis career ===
In the 1999 Roland Garros, she won the junior girls' singles, defeating Stéphanie Foretz in the final.

In 2000, she played her first WTA Tour main draw at Madrid. In 2002, she won her first main draw match at Bogotá. In Porto, she defeated then-No. 33 Cristina Torrens Valero. In August, Lino was suspended from the tour for three months, after testing positive for cocaine that March.

In 2005, she reached the top 100 for the first time. In Bogotá, she made it to the final as a qualifier, losing to Flavia Pennetta. She ended at No. 77 in the world in singles and No. 63 in doubles.

She won her first WTA Tour title in Bogotá by defeating then-world No. 18, Flavia Pennetta. She reached the final of Budapest, losing to Anna Smashnova, and ended the year at No. 52 in singles.

In 2007, she reached the semifinals at Bogotá and the quarterfinals at Estoril, Palermo, and Bad Gastein. She ended at No. 72 in the world in singles.

In 2011, she won her second WTA title, defeating Mathilde Johansson in the final at Bogotá. After this, she reached quarterfinals at Acapulco.

In November 2016, she announced her retirement from professional tour.

== Grand Slam performance timelines ==
Key
W	F	SF	QF	#R	RR	Q#	DNQ	A	NH

(W) winner; (F) finalist; (SF) semifinalist; (QF) quarterfinalist; (#R) rounds 4, 3, 2, 1; (RR) round-robin stage; (Q#) qualification round; (DNQ) did not qualify; (A) absent; (NH) not held; (SR) strike rate (events won / competed); (W–L) win–loss record.

=== Singles ===
Tournament	2000	2001	2002	2003	2004	2005	2006	2007	2008	2009	2010	2011	2012	2013	2014	2015	2016	W–L
Australian Open	A	A	A	A	A	Q2	1R	2R	1R	2R	Q3	2R	1R	1R	1R	Q1	1R	3–9
French Open	A	A	Q3	A	A	Q3	1R	1R	Q1	3R	Q3	1R	2R	1R	1R	2R	1R	4–9
Wimbledon	A	A	A	A	A	A	1R	1R	Q2	1R	A	2R	2R	1R	2R	Q2	Q1	3–7
US Open	Q1	Q1	A	A	Q1	Q1	1R	2R	1R	1R	3R	A	2R	1R	Q1	1R	Q1	4–8
Win–loss	0–0	0–0	0–0	0–0	0–0	0–0	0–4	2–4	0–2	3–4	2–1	2–3	3–4	0–4	1–3	1–2	0–2	14–33

=== Doubles ===
Tournament	2000	2001	2002	2003	2004	2005	2006	2007	2008	2009	2010	2011	2012	2013	2014	W–L
Australian Open	A	A	A	A	A	A	2R	1R	1R	A	A	1R	1R	1R	1R	1–7
French Open	A	A	2R	A	A	3R	2R	2R	A	2R	A	2R	1R	1R	A	7–8
Wimbledon	A	A	A	A	A	A	2R	2R	A	1R	A	1R	2R	1R	A	3–6
US Open	1R	1R	A	A	A	1R	1R	1R	A	A	A	A	A	1R	A	0–6
Win–loss	0–1	0–1	1–1	0–0	0–0	2–2	3–4	2–4	0–1	1–2	0–0	1–3	1–3	0–4	0–1	11–27

== WTA Tour finals ==
=== Singles: 5 (2 titles, 3 runner-ups) ===
Legend Grand Slam tournaments Premier M & Premier 5 Premier International (2–3)	Finals by surface Hard (0–0) Grass (0–0) Clay (2–3) Carpet (0–0)

Result	W–L	Date	Tournament	Tier	Surface	Opponent	Score
Loss	0–1	Feb 2005	Copa Colsanitas, Colombia	Tier III (Note: In 2009, the Tier II were reclassified as WTA Premier tournaments, while the Tier III, Tier IV and Tier V tournaments were reclassified as WTA International tournaments.)	Clay	(Italy) Flavia Pennetta	6–7^{(4–7)}, 4–6
Win	1–1	Feb 2006	Copa Colsanitas, Colombia	Tier III	Clay	(Italy) Flavia Pennetta	7–6^{(7–3)}, 6–4
Loss	1–2	Jul 2006	Budapest Grand Prix, Hungary	Tier IV	Clay	(Israel) Anna Smashnova	1–6, 3–6
Win	2–2	Feb 2011	Copa Colsanitas, Colombia (2)	International	Clay	(France) Mathilde Johansson	2–6, 6–3, 6–2
Loss	2–3	Apr 2013	Marrakech Grand Prix, Morocco	International	Clay	(Italy) Francesca Schiavone	1–6, 3–6

=== Doubles: 13 (6 titles, 7 runner-ups) ===
Legend Grand Slam tournaments Premier M & Premier 5 Premier International (6–7)	Finals by surface Hard (0–0) Grass (0–0) Clay (6–7) Carpet (0–0)

Result	W–L	Date	Tournament	Tier	Surface	Partner	Opponents	Score
Loss	0–1	May 2005	Rabat Grand Prix, Morocco	Tier III	Clay	(Spain) Nuria Llagostera Vives	(France) Émilie Loit (Czech Republic) Barbora Záhlavová-Strýcová	6–3, 6–7^{(6–8)}, 5–7
Loss	0–2	Aug 2005	Budapest Grand Prix, Hungary	Tier IV	Clay	(Spain) Marta Marrero	(France) Émilie Loit (Slovenia) Katarina Srebotnik	1–6, 6–3, 2–6
Win	1–2	Feb 2007	Copa Colsanitas, Colombia	Tier III	Clay	(Argentina) Paola Suárez	(Italy) Roberta Vinci (Italy) Flavia Pennetta	1–6, 6–3, [11–9]
Win	2–2	Mar 2007	Mexican Open, Acapulco	Tier III	Clay	(Spain) Arantxa Parra Santonja	(Australia) Nicole Pratt (France) Émilie Loit	6–3, 6–3
Loss	2–3	Apr 2007	Estoril Open, Portugal	Tier IV	Clay	(Spain) Arantxa Parra Santonja	(Russia) Anastasia Rodionova (Romania) Andreea Ehritt-Vanc	3–6, 2–6
Loss	2–4	Jun 2007	Barcelona Ladies Open, Spain	Tier IV	Clay	(Italy) Flavia Pennetta	(Spain) Arantxa Parra Santonja (Spain) Nuria Llagostera Vives	6–7^{(3–7)}, 6–2, [10–12]
Win	3–4	Jun 2008	Barcelona Ladies Open, Spain	Tier IV	Clay	(Spain) Arantxa Parra Santonja	(Spain) María José Martínez Sánchez (Spain) Nuria Llagostera Vives	4–6, 7–5, [10–4]
Loss	3–5	Mar 2009	Mexican Open, Acapulco	International	Clay	(Spain) Arantxa Parra Santonja	(Spain) María José Martínez Sánchez (Spain) Nuria Llagostera Vives	3–6, 3–6
Loss	3–6	Feb 2011	Mexican Open, Acapulco	International	Clay	(Spain) Arantxa Parra Santonja	(Ukraine) Mariya Koryttseva (Romania) Ioana Raluca Olaru	5–7, 7–5, [10–6]
Win	4–6	Jul 2011	Båstad Open, Sweden	International	Clay	(Spain) María José Martínez Sánchez	(Spain) Arantxa Parra Santonja (Spain) Nuria Llagostera Vives	6–3, 6–3
Loss	4–7	Mar 2012	Mexican Open, Acapulco	International	Clay	(Spain) Arantxa Parra Santonja	(Italy) Sara Errani (Italy) Roberta Vinci	2–6, 1–6
Win	5–7	Mar 2013	Mexican Open, Acapulco (2)	International	Clay	(Spain) Arantxa Parra Santonja	(Colombia) Catalina Castaño (Colombia) Mariana Duque Mariño	6–4, 7–6^{(7–1)}
Win	6–7	Apr 2013	Katowice Open, Poland	International	Clay (i)	(Spain) Lara Arruabarrena	(Romania) Raluca Olaru (Russia) Valeria Solovyeva	6–4, 7–5

== ITF Circuit finals ==
Legend
$100,000 tournaments
$75,000 tournaments
$50,000 tournaments
$25,000 tournaments
$10,000 tournaments

=== Singles: 30 (17 titles, 13 runner-ups) ===
Result	W–L	Date	Tournament	Tier	Surface	Opponent	Score
Loss	1.	19 January 1997	ITF Pontevedra, Spain	10,000	Hard (i)	(Netherlands) Henriëtte van Aalderen	4–6, 2–6
Loss	2.	25 May 1997	ITF Zaragoza, Spain	10,000	Clay	(Netherlands) Kim de Weille	4–6, 3–6
Win	1.	8 February 1998	ITF Mallorca, Spain	10,000	Clay	(Germany) Julia Abe	6–2, 6–3
Win	2.	22 June 1998	ITF Santander, Spain	10,000	Clay	(Spain) Patricia Aznar	1–6, 6–3, 7–6^{(3)}
Loss	3.	16 August 1998	ITF Koksijde, Belgium	10,000	Clay	(Belgium) Kim Clijsters	3–6, 4–6
Win	3.	23 August 1998	ITF Brussels, Belgium	10,000	Clay	(Belgium) Evy Last	2–6, 6–3, 6–2
Win	4.	13 September 1998	ITF Fano, Italy	10,000	Clay	(Italy) Laura Dell'Angelo	6–1, 6–1
Win	5.	10 May 1999	ITF Tortosa, Spain	10,000	Clay	(Italy) Anna Floris	6–1, 6–4
Win	6.	4 July 1999	ITF Mont-de-Marsan, France	25,000	Clay	(Argentina) María Fernanda Landa	6–3, 6–4
Loss	4.	18 July 1999	ITF Getxo, Spain	25,000	Clay	(Spain) Marta Marrero	2–6, 7–6, 4–6
Win	7.	4 June 2000	ITF Modena, Italy	25,000	Clay	(Spain) María José Martínez Sánchez	4–6, 6–4, 7–5
Loss	5.	18 July 1999	ITF Orbetello, Italy	25,000	Clay	(Spain) Nuria Llagostera Vives	4–6, 2–6
Win	8.	8 October 2000	ITF Girona, Spain	25,000	Clay	(Argentina) Luciana Masante	0–4, 4–5, 4–0
Loss	6.	28 July 2003	ITF Pontevedra, Spain	10,000	Hard	(Argentina) María José Argeri	3–6, 6–2, 2–6
Win	9.	21 March 2004	ITF Rome, Italy	10,000	Clay	(Spain) Marta Fraga	6–1, 6–2
Loss	7.	26 September 2004	ITF Jounieh Open, Lebanon	50,000	Clay	(Spain) Nuria Llagostera Vives	6–2, 0–6, 4–6
Win	10.	14 August 2005	ITF Rimini, Italy	50,000	Clay	(Ukraine) Mariya Koryttseva	0–6, 6–0, 6–3
Loss	8.	25 September 2005	ITF Jounieh Open, Lebanon	75,000	Clay	(Ukraine) Mariya Koryttseva	5–7, 5–7
Loss	9.	2 October 2005	ITF Porto, Portugal	25,000	Clay	(Austria) Tina Schiechtl	6–7, 6–7
Win	11.	30 October 2005	ITF Sant Cugat, Spain	25,000	Clay	(Hungary) Rita Kuti-Kis	4–6, 6–0, 6–2
Loss	10.	10 May 2008	ITF Jounieh Open, Lebanon	50,000	Clay	(United Kingdom) Anne Keothavong	4–6, 1–6
Loss	11.	3 August 2008	ITF Rimini, Italy	75,000	Clay	(Germany) Anna-Lena Grönefeld	1–6, 2–6
Win	12.	14 September 2008	ITF Athens Open, Greece	100,000	Clay	(Romania) Sorana Cîrstea	6–4, 6–4
Win	13.	31 May 2010	ITF Rome, Italy	50,000	Clay	(Switzerland) Romina Oprandi	5–7, 6–3, 6–3
Win	14.	17 June 2012	Open de Marseille, France	100,000	Clay	(France) Pauline Parmentier	6–3, 6–3
Loss	12.	28 September 2014	ITF Juárez, Mexico	25,000	Clay	(Spain) Laura Pous Tió	4–6, 1–6
Loss	13.	12 October 2014	ITF Monterrey, Mexico	50,000	Hard	(Belgium) An-Sophie Mestach	3–6, 5–7
Win	15.	8 March 2015	ITF Curitiba, Brazil	25,000	Clay	(Montenegro) Danka Kovinić	4–6, 6–2, 6–3
Win	16.	21 June 2015	Open de Montpellier, France	50,000	Clay	(Spain) Sílvia Soler Espinosa	6–4, 6–3
Win	17.	11 October 2015	Abierto Tampico, Mexico	50,000	Hard	(France) Alizé Lim	7–5, 6–4

=== Doubles: 59 (36 titles, 23 runner-ups) ===
Result	No.	Date	Tournament	Tier	Surface	Partner	Opponents	Score
Win	1.	4 May 1997	Balaguer, Spain	10,000	Clay	(Spain) Nuria Montero	(Argentina) Celeste Contin (Spain) Conchita Martínez Granados	0–6, 6–2, 6–4
Loss	1.	25 May 1997	Zaragoza, Spain	10,000	Clay	(Spain) Eva Bes	(Netherlands) Kim de Weille (Hungary) Nóra Köves	6–7^{(4)}, 4–6
Win	2.	7 July 1997	Vigo, Spain	10,000	Clay	(Spain) Nuria Montero	(Spain) Gisela Riera (Spain) Conchita Martínez Granados	6–3, 6–0
Win	3.	5 October 1997	Lleida, Spain	10,000	Clay	(Spain) Nuria Montero	(Netherlands) Carlijn Buis (Spain) Noelia Serra	6–7^{(1)}, 6–2, 6–1
Loss	2.	12 October 1997	Girona, Spain	10,000	Clay	(Spain) Nuria Montero	(Spain) Conchita Martínez Granados (Spain) Gisela Riera	6–2, 3–6, 4–6
Win	4.	26 January 1998	Ourense, Spain	10,000	Hard	(Spain) Elena Salvador	(Italy) Sabina Da Ponte (Italy) Monica Scartoni	6–4, 6–4
Loss	3.	18 May 1998	Zaragoza, Spain	10,000	Clay	(Argentina) Veronica Stele	(Spain) Gisela Riera (Switzerland) Aliénor Tricerri	4–6, 1–6
Win	5.	22 June 1998	Santander, Spain	10,000	Clay	(Spain) Marina Escobar	(Colombia) Juliana Garcia (Colombia) Mariana Mesa	6–1, 7–6^{(1)}
Win	6.	6 July 1998	Vigo, Spain	10,000	Clay	(Spain) Elena Salvador	(Argentina) Paula Racedo (Brazil) Vanessa Menga	6–1, 4–6, 6–2
Win	7.	18 July 1998	Getxo, Spain	25,000	Clay	(Brazil) Vanessa Menga	(Japan) Tomoe Hotta (Slovenia) Petra Rampre	3–6, 6–4, 7–5
Loss	4.	23 August 1998	Brussels, Belgium	10,000	Clay	(Argentina) Luciana Masante	(Belgium) Kim Clijsters (Belgium) Cindy Schuurmans	6–7, 5–7
Win	8.	7 September 1998	Fano, Italy	10,000	Clay	(Italy) Laura Dell'Angelo	(Slovakia) Patrícia Marková (Slovenia) Petra Rampre	7–6, 2–6, 6–3
Win	9.	11 October 1998	Girona, Spain	10,000	Clay	(Spain) Rosa María Andrés Rodríguez	(Spain) Marta Marrero (Spain) María José Martínez Sánchez	4–6, 6–1, 7–6
Win	10.	7 February 1999	Mallorca, Spain	10,000	Clay	(Spain) Rosa María Andrés Rodríguez	(Italy) Alice Canepa (Argentina) María Fernanda Landa	6–1, 6–1
Win	11.	23 May 1999	Zaragoza, Spain	10,000	Clay	(Colombia) Mariana Mesa	(Argentina) Melisa Arévalo (Argentina) Jorgelina Torti	w/o
Win	12.	5 July 1999	Vigo, Spain	10,000	Clay	(Spain) Anabel Medina Garrigues	(Spain) Patricia Aznar (Spain) Ana Salas Lozano	7–5, 6–1
Win	13.	25 July 1999	Ettenheim, Germany	25,000	Clay	(Spain) Eva Bes	(Austria) Patricia Wartusch (Germany) Jasmin Wöhr	7–5, 6–4
Win	14.	23 August 1999	Bucharest, Romania	25,000	Clay	(Spain) Anabel Medina Garrigues	(Belarus) Nadejda Ostrovskaya (Slovakia) Zuzana Váleková	7–5, 6–2
Win	15.	27 September 1999	Porto, Portugal	25,000	Clay	(Spain) María José Martínez Sánchez	(Spain) Alicia Ortuño (Czech Republic) Michaela Paštiková	3–6, 6–2, 6–1
Win	16.	3 April 2000	Cagliari, Italy	25,000	Clay	(Spain) Alicia Ortuño	(Czech Republic) Michaela Paštiková (Germany) Jasmin Wöhr	7–5, 3–6, 6–3
Loss	5.	17 April 2000	Gelos, France	25,000	Clay	(Spain) Anabel Medina Garrigues	(Spain) Eva Bes (Spain) Marta Marrero	3–6, 4–6
Win	17.	3 June 2000	Modena, Italy	25,000	Clay	(Spain) María José Martínez Sánchez	(Slovenia) Tina Hergold (Slovenia) Maja Matevžič	6–4, 4–6, 6–3
Loss	6.	12 June 2000	Grado Tennis Cup, Italy	25,000	Clay	(Spain) María José Martínez Sánchez	(Brazil) Vanessa Menga (Spain) Alicia Ortuño	6–3, 5–7, 1–6
Loss	7.	10 July 2000	Getxo, Spain	25,000	Clay	(Spain) María José Martínez Sánchez	(Croatia) Maja Palaveršić (Spain) Alicia Ortuño	1–6, 2–6
Loss	8.	17 July 2000	Le Touquet, France	25,000	Clay	(Argentina) Eugenia Chialvo	(Germany) Bianka Lamade (Germany) Jasmin Wöhr	3–6, 5–7
Win	18.	4 September 2000	Denain, France	50,000	Clay	(Spain) María José Martínez Sánchez	(Russia) Elena Bovina (Argentina) Mariana Díaz Oliva	6–4, 6–0
Loss	9.	11 September 2000	Bordeaux, France	75,000	Clay	(Spain) María Sánchez Lorenzo	(France) Virginie Razzano (Austria) Melanie Schnell	6–2, 5–7, 3–6
Loss	10.	1 October 2000	Verona, Italy	25,000	Clay	(Argentina) Eugenia Chialvo	(Italy) Maria Elena Camerin (Romania) Andreea Ehritt-Vanc	6–7, 2–6
Win	19.	2 October 2000	Girona, Spain	25,000	Clay	(Spain) Eva Bes	(Spain) Mariam Ramon Climent (Spain) Gisela Riera	4–2, 5–4^{(5–3)}, 4–2
Loss	11.	16 April 2001	Gelos, France	25,000	Clay	(Spain) Eva Bes	(Germany) Vanessa Henke (Germany) Syna Schmidle	2–6, 3–6
Win	20.	23 April 2001	Caserta, Italy	50,000	Clay	(Spain) Eva Bes	(Spain) María José Martínez Sánchez (Spain) Gisela Riera	6–1, 7–6^{(5)}
Loss	12.	30 July 2001	Saint-Gaudens, France	50,000	Clay	(Spain) Gisela Riera	(France) Sarah Pitkowski-Malcor (Kazakhstan) Irina Selyutina	2–6, 3–6
Loss	13.	30 September 2001	Verona, Italy	25,000	Clay	(Spain) Conchita Martínez Granados	(Estonia) Maret Ani (Czech Republic) Michaela Paštiková	7–6^{(4)}, 4–6, 6–7^{(5)}
Win	21.	1 October 2001	Girona, Spain	50,000	Clay	(Spain) Eva Bes	(Italy) Maria Elena Camerin (Spain) Nuria Llagostera Vives	6–2, 4–6, 6–1
Win	22.	16 June 2002	Open de Marseille, France	50,000	Clay	(Spain) Conchita Martínez Granados	(Germany) Sandra Klösel (Germany) Vanessa Henke	7–5, 4–6, 6–0
Loss	14.	2 March 2003	Las Palmas, Spain	10,000	Clay	(Spain) Mariam Ramón Climent	(Spain) María José Sánchez Alayeto (Spain) Marta Fraga	6–2, 5–7, 3–6
Win	23.	6 October 2003	Juárez, Mexico	50,000	Clay	(Spain) Nuria Llagostera Vives	(Czech Republic) Jana Hlaváčková (Czech Republic) Hana Šromová	4–6, 6–2, 6–3
Loss	15.	14 February 2004	Mallorca, Spain	10,000	Clay	(Spain) Laura Pous Tió	(Serbia and Montenegro) Ana Timotić (Spain) Rosa María Andrés Rodríguez	6–3, 4–6, 4–6
Win	24.	28 March 2004	Elda, Spain	10,000	Clay	(Portugal) Frederica Piedade	(Czech Republic) Andrea Hlaváčková (Czech Republic) Jana Hlaváčková	w/o
Win	25.	25 April 2004	Poza Rica, Mexico	25,000	Hard	(Portugal) Frederica Piedade	(Argentina) Jorgelina Cravero (Turkey) İpek Şenoğlu	7–5, 6–0
Loss	16.	30 April 2004	Coatzacoalcos, Mexico	25,000	Hard	(Spain) Laura Pous Tió	(Argentina) Soledad Esperón (Argentina) Flavia Mignola	0–6, 1–6
Win	26.	28 June 2004	Mont-de-Marsan, France	25,000	Clay	(Spain) Paula García	(Russia) Nina Bratchikova (Portugal) Frederica Piedade	6–3, 3–6, 6–4
Win	27.	31 August 2004	Save CupMestre, Italy	25,000	Clay	(Spain) Rosa María Andrés Rodríguez	(Hungary) Katalin Marosi (Brazil) Marina Tavares	6–1, 6–2
Win	28.	23 October 2004	Seville, Spain	25,000	Clay	(Spain) Laura Pous Tió	(Hungary) Kira Nagy (Hungary) Virág Németh	6–2, 6–3
Win	29.	20 November 2004	Barcelona, Spain	25,000	Clay	(Spain) Laura Pous Tió	(Russia) Nina Bratchikova (Russia) Ekaterina Kozhokina	6–2, 6–3
Win	30.	27 March 2005	San Luis Potosí, Mexico	25,000	Clay	(Argentina) Clarisa Fernández	(Brazil) Joana Cortez (Japan) Tomoko Yonemura	6–2, 6–2
Loss	17.	7 August 2005	Martina Franca, Italy	50,000	Clay	(Spain) Conchita Martínez Granados	(Hungary) Zsófia Gubacsi (Ukraine) Mariya Koryttseva	1–6, 3–6
Win	31.	7 October 2005	Barcelona Ladies Open, Spain	75,000	Clay	(Spain) María Sánchez Lorenzo	(Spain) Conchita Martínez Granados (Spain) María José Martínez Sánchez	7–5, 6–7^{(4)}, 7–6^{(3)}
Win	32.	30 October 2005	ITF Sant Cugat, Spain	25,000	Clay	(Spain) Arantxa Parra Santonja	(Spain) Conchita Martínez Granados (Spain) María José Martínez Sánchez	6–4, 6–3
Loss	18.	18 July 2008	Internazionali di Biella, Italy	100,000	Clay	(Spain) Arantxa Parra Santonja	(Czech Republic) Barbora Strýcová (Czech Republic) Renata Voráčová	6–4, 0–6, [5–10]
Win	33.	7 September 2008	Denain Open, France	75,000	Clay	(Estonia) Maret Ani	(France) Stéphanie Cohen-Aloro (Canada) Marie-Ève Pelletier	6–0, 7–5
Loss	19.	21 September 2008	Sofia Cup, Bulgaria	100,000	Clay	(Spain) Arantxa Parra Santonja	(Estonia) Maret Ani (Czech Republic) Renata Voráčová	6–7^{(4)}, 6–7^{(9)}
Loss	20.	10 July 2010	Open de Biarritz, France	100,000	Clay	(Romania) Monica Niculescu	(Canada) Sharon Fichman (Germany) Julia Görges	5–7, 4–6
Win	34.	2 June 2014	Open de Marseille, France	100,000	Clay	(Spain) Beatriz García Vidagany	(Ukraine) Yuliya Beygelzimer (Ukraine) Olga Savchuk	6–1, 6–2
Loss	21.	11 July 2014	Open de Biarritz, France	100,000	Clay	(Brazil) Teliana Pereira	(Argentina) Florencia Molinero (Liechtenstein) Stephanie Vogt	2–6, 2–6
Win	35.	12 October 2014	Internacional de Monterrey, México	50,000	Hard	(Colombia) Mariana Duque Mariño	(Belgium) Elise Mertens (Netherlands) Arantxa Rus	6–3, 7–6^{(4)}
Win	36.	10 April 2015	Open Medellín, Colombia	50,000	Clay	(Luxembourg) Mandy Minella	(Colombia) Mariana Duque Mariño (Israel) Julia Glushko	7–5, 4–6, [10–5]
Loss	22.	5 June 2016	Open de Marseille, France	100,000	Clay	(Slovakia) Jana Čepelová	(Chinese Taipei) Hsieh Su-wei (United States) Nicole Melichar	6–1, 3–6, [3–10]
Loss	23.	19 June 2016	Open de Montpellier, France	25,000	Clay	(Switzerland) Jil Teichmann	(India) Prarthana Thombare (Netherlands) Eva Wacanno	5–7, 6–2, [9–11]

== See also ==
- List of sportspeople sanctioned for doping offences
