= Paula Hermida =

Spanish tennis player (born 1977)

- Full name: Paula Hermida Velo
- Country (sports): Spain
- Born: 24 October 1977 (age 48) Ferrol, Spain
- Retired: 2001
- Prize money: $92,380

Singles
- Career record: 212-129
- Career titles: 10 ITF
- Highest ranking: No. 148 (13 May 1996)

Doubles
- Career record: 56-65
- Career titles: 5 ITF
- Highest ranking: No. 230 (24 July 1995)

Paula Hermida Velo (born 24 October 1977) is a Spanish former professional tennis player.

== Biography ==
Hermida comes from the Galician city of Ferrol and was coached by her father. She won the Spanish Junior Championships as an 11-year old in 1988.

As a professional she won 10 ITF singles titles, reaching a best ranking of 148 in the world. She featured in the main draw of the Birmingham Classic WTA Tour tournament in 1996 and during her career played in the qualifying event at all four grand slams.

Retiring from professional tennis in 2001, Hermida went on to compete in the sport of padel tennis.

== ITF finals ==
=== Singles (10–6) ===
$100,000 tournaments
$75,000 tournaments
$50,000 tournaments
$25,000 tournaments
$10,000 tournaments

Result	No.	Date	Tournament	Surface	Opponent	Score
Win	1.	24 January 1994	Pontevedra, Spain	Carpet	(Italy) Germana Di Natale	7–6, 3–6, 6–2
Loss	2.	31 July 1994	A Coruña, Spain	Clay	(Luxembourg) Anne Kremer	5–7, 1–6
Win	3.	23 January 1995	Pontevedra Spain	Hard	(Belarus) Olga Barabanschikova	6–1, 6–7^{(5)}, 6–4
Win	4.	13 February 1995	Faro, Portugal	Hard	(France) Amelie Cocheteux	7–5, 6–3
Win	5.	20 February 1995	Carvoeiro, Portugal	Hard	(France) Vanina Casanova	6–1, 6–3
Win	6.	4 September 1995	Cáceres, Spain	Clay	(Spain) Alicia Ortuño	6–3, 6–2
Loss	7.	3 December 1995	Limoges, France	Hard (i)	(Bulgaria) Elena Pampoulova	5–7, 3–6
Loss	8.	14 April 1997	Elvas, Portugal	Hard	(Spain) Alicia Ortuño	4–6, 3–6
DNP	—	4 May 1997	Azeméis, Portugal	Clay	(Spain) Alicia Ortuño	—
Win	9.	9 February 1998	Faro, Portugal	Hard	(Portugal) Sofia Prazeres	6–4, 6–4
Win	10.	30 March 1998	Pontevedra, Spain	Hard	(Bulgaria) Maria Geznenge	6–1, 6–2
Win	11.	18 May 1998	Azeméis, Portugal	Hard	(Kazakhstan) Irina Selyutina	6–1, 6–1
Loss	12.	24 May 1999	Guimarães, Portugal	Hard	(Israel) Tzipora Obziler	0–6, 4–6
Win	13.	22 August 1999	Alghero, Italy	Clay	(Italy) Flavia Pennetta	6–4, 6–4
Win	14.	4 October 1999	Vila do Conde, Portugal	Hard	(Slovakia) Stanislava Hrozenská	6–2, 6–2
Loss	15.	17 October 1999	Welwyn, United Kingdom	Hard (i)	(France) Laurence Andretto	0–6, 3–6
Loss	16.	23 July 2000	Valladolid, Spain	Hard	(Spain) María José Martínez Sánchez	4–6, 2–6

=== Doubles (5–4) ===
Result	No.	Date	Tournament	Surface	Partner	Opponents	Score
Loss	1.	31 July 1994	A Coruña, Spain	Clay	(Spain) Sandra de Rafael	(France) Olivia de Camaret (Tunisia) Selima Sfar	6–4, 2–6, 3–6
Loss	2.	16 January 1995	Ourense, Spain	Hard	(Belarus) Olga Barabanschikova	(Netherlands) Stephanie Gomperts (Netherlands) Henriëtte van Aalderen	5–7, 1–6
Win	3.	23 January 1995	Pontevedra, Spain	Hard	(Belarus) Olga Barabanschikova	(Italy) Katia Altilia (France) Stephanie Content	6–3, 6–3
Loss	4.	20 February 1995	Carvoeiro, Portugal	Hard	(Italy) Katia Altilia	(Germany) Renata Kochta (Germany) Martina Pawlik	5–7, 4–6
Win	5.	18 February 1996	Cali, Colombia	Clay	(Spain) Eva Bes	(Brazil) Miriam D'Agostini (Paraguay) Larissa Schaerer	6–3, 2–6, 6–3
Win	6.	4 May 1997	Azeméis, Portugal	Clay	(Canada) Aneta Soukup	(Israel) Shiri Burstein (Israel) Limor Gabai	6–0, 6–4
Win	7.	14 September 1997	Madrid, Spain	Clay	(Spain) Patricia Aznar	(Spain) Marta Cano (Spain) Gala León García	5–7, 6–3, 6–3
Win	8.	3 May 1998	Guimarães, Portugal	Hard	(Spain) Marina Escobar	(Brazil) Bruna Colósio (Portugal) Cristina Correia	7–6, 6–4
Loss	9.	10 May 1998	Elvas, Portugal	Hard	(Spain) Marina Escobar	(Spain) Rosa María Andrés Rodríguez (Netherlands) Debby Haak	W/O
