= Ana Alcázar =

Spanish tennis player (born 1979)

- Country (sports): Spain
- Born: 8 June 1979 (age 46)
- Turned pro: 1994
- Retired: 1999
- Prize money: $61,848

Singles
- Career record: 88 - 49
- Career titles: 6 ITF
- Highest ranking: No. 119 (8 June 1998)

Grand Slam singles results
- Australian Open: Q2 (1998)
- French Open: 1R (1998)

Doubles
- Career record: 21 – 22
- Highest ranking: No. 252 (16 February 1998)

Ana Alcázar (born 8 June 1979) is a former Spanish female tennis player.

She has won six singles titles in her ITF career. On 8 June 1998, she reached her best singles ranking of world number 119. On 16 February 1998, she peaked at world number 252 in the doubles rankings.

== ITF finals ==
=== Singles finals (6–2) ===
$100,000 tournaments
$75,000 tournaments
$50,000 tournaments
$25,000 tournaments
$10,000 tournaments

Result	No.	Date	Tournament	Surface	Opponent	Score
Win	1.	4 April 1994	Murcia, Spain	Clay	(Spain) Gisela Riera	6–3, 6–3
Win	2.	17 April 1995	Murcia, Spain	Clay	(France) Amélie Cocheteux	6–0, 6–1
Loss	1.	27 May 1996	Barcelona, Spain	Clay	(Germany) Syna Schmidle	3–6, 2–6
Loss	2.	5 August 1996	Budapest, Hungary	Clay	(Slovenia) Barbara Mulej	6–2, 4–6, 1–6
Win	3.	30 September 1996	Lerida, Spain	Clay	(Spain) Eva Bes	6–3, 1–6, 6–2
Win	4.	30 June 1997	Vaihingen, Germany	Clay	(Germany) Sandra Klösel	6–3, 6–4
Win	5.	15 September 1997	Sofia, Bulgaria	Clay	(New Zealand) Pavlina Nola	2–6, 6–3, 6–1
Win	6.	29 September 1997	Otočec, Slovenia	Clay	(Austria) Barbara Schwartz	6–3, 6–2

=== Doubles finals (0–2) ===
$100,000 tournaments
$75,000 tournaments
$50,000 tournaments
$25,000 tournaments
$10,000 tournaments

Result	No.	Date	Tournament	Surface	Partner	Opponents	Score
Loss	1.	25 April 1994	Lerida, Spain	Clay	(Spain) Rosa María Andrés Rodríguez	(Spain) Rosa María Pérez (Argentina) Valentina Solari	7–6^{(7–5)}, 6–7^{(4–7)}, 5–7
Loss	2.	1 September 1997	Spoleto, Italy	Clay	(Spain) Eva Bes	(Czech Republic) Kateřina Kroupová-Šišková (Czech Republic) Jana Pospíšilová	1–6, 0–6

Sporting positions
Preceded by (Russia) Anna Kournikova	Orange Bowl Girls' Singles Champion; Category: 18 and under 1996	Succeeded by (Slovenia) Tina Pisnik
Preceded by (France) Nathalie Dechy	Orange Bowl Girls' Singles Champion; Category: 14 and under 1995	Succeeded by (Russia) Elena Dementieva
