= Eva Jiménez =

Spanish tennis player (born 1975)

Eva Jiménez Sanz
- Full name: Eva Jiménez Sanz
- Country (sports): Spain
- Born: 19 May 1975 (age 50)
- College: USC; University of Miami
- Prize money: $36,582

Singles
- Highest ranking: No. 137 (7 February 1994)

Doubles
- Highest ranking: No. 171 (14 June 1993)

Eva Jiménez Sanz (born 19 May 1975) is a Spanish former professional tennis player.

== Biography ==
Jiménez competed on the professional tour in the 1990s, reaching the best singles ranking of 180 in the world. At the 1993 Mediterranean Games, Jiménez partnered with Virginia Ruano Pascual to win a bronze medal in the women's doubles event. She was a quarter-finalist at a WTA Tour tournament in Curitiba in 1993 and featured in the qualifying draw of the 1994 US Open.

Following her retirement from professional tennis, Jiménez played at college level in the United States, first at USC and then the University of Miami. She now lives in Madrid.

== ITF finals ==
=== Singles (1–2) ===
Legend
$25,000 tournaments
$10,000 / $15,000 tournaments

Outcome	No.	Date	Tournament	Surface	Opponent	Score
Runner-up	1.	16 March 1992	Zaragoza, Spain	Clay	(Austria) Barbara Schett	4–6, 4–6
Winner	2.	23 March 1992	Santander, Spain	Clay	(Slovenia) Tina Vukasovič	6–2, 6–2
Runner-up	3.	2 August 1993	Munich, Germany	Clay	(Czech Republic) Eva Martincová	6–7, 1–6

=== Doubles (2–2) ===
Outcome	No.	Date	Tournament	Surface	Partner	Opponents	Score
Winner	1.	25 March 1991	Bilbao, Spain	Clay	(Spain) Cristina Torrens Valero	(Germany) Cora Linneman (Spain) Ana Larrakoetxea	7–5, 7–6^{(4)}
Runner-up	2.	13 May 1991	Balaguer, Spain	Clay	(Spain) Cristina Torrens Valero	(Germany) Cora Linneman (Spain) Ana Larrakoetxea	7–5, 3–6, 3–6
Runner-up	3.	16 September 1991	Capua, Italy	Clay	(Spain) María del Carmen García	(Czechoslovakia) Janette Husárová (Czechoslovakia) Monika Kratochvílová	1–6, 1–6
Winner	4.	26 April 1993	Porto, Portugal	Clay	(Spain) Eva Bes	(Spain) Vanessa Castellano (Spain) Alicia Ortuño	5–7, 6–1, 6–3
