= Alicia Ortuño =

Spanish tennis player (born 1976)

- Country (sports): Spain
- Born: 2 May 1976 (age 49) Barcelona, Spain
- Turned pro: 1990
- Retired: 2002
- Prize money: $168,690

Singles
- Career record: 213–176
- Career titles: 0 WTA, 6 ITF
- Highest ranking: No. 155 (20 July 1998)

Grand Slam singles results
- Australian Open: Q2 (1996)
- French Open: Q2 (1998)
- Wimbledon: Q1 (1998)
- US Open: Q1 (1998, 1999)

Doubles
- Career record: 196–119
- Career titles: 1 WTA, 24 ITF
- Highest ranking: No. 82 (1 November 1999)

Grand Slam doubles results
- Australian Open: 1R (1999, 2000)
- French Open: 3R (1999)
- Wimbledon: 1R (1999)
- US Open: 1R (1999)

Alicia Ortuño (Spanish pronunciation: [aˈliθja oɾˈtuɲo]; born 2 May 1976) is a former professional tennis player from Spain. From 1990 to 2001, she won 30 titles on the ITF Women's Circuit, and one doubles title on the WTA Tour. She appeared in six Grand Slam events.

== Career highlights ==
On 1 November 1999, Ortuño reached her highest doubles ranking of world No. 82. Her highest singles ranking came on 20 July 1998, when she became world No. 155.

In 1994, Ortuño partnered with Cristina Torrens Valero to win her first ITF doubles title in the $25k Barcelona tournament. In 1999, Ortuño and Torrens-Valero partnered again to win the doubles title of the WTA Tour Estoril Open.

=== Grand Slam appearances ===
From 1996–1999, Ortuño competed in six Grand Slam tournaments: twice at the Australian Open, once at the French Open, once at Wimbledon and twice at the US Open.

== WTA career finals ==
=== Doubles: 1 (1 title) ===
Legend
Tier I
Tier II
Tier III
Tier IV & V (1–0)

| Result | Date | Tournament | Surface | Partner | Opponents | Score |
|---|---|---|---|---|---|---|
| Win | Apr 1999 | Estoril Open, Portugal | Clay | (Spain) Cristina Torrens Valero | (Hungary) Anna Földényi (Hungary) Rita Kuti-Kis | 7–6^{(7–4)}, 3–6, 6–3 |

== ITF Circuit finals ==
$100,000 tournaments
$75,000 tournaments
$50,000 tournaments
$25,000 tournaments
$10,000 tournaments

=== Singles: 10 (6–4) ===
| Result | No. | Date | Tournament | Surface | Opponent | Score |
|---|---|---|---|---|---|---|
| Win | 1. | 19 June 1995 | ITF Elvas, Portugal | Hard | (Spain) Marta Cano | 4–6, 6–2, 7–6^{(3)} |
| Loss | 2. | 4 September 1995 | ITF Cáceres, Spain | Clay | (Spain) Paula Hermida | 3–6, 2–6 |
| Win | 3. | 5 February 1996 | ITF Carvoeiro Portugal | Hard | (Italy) Emanuela Brusati | 6–4, 6–3 |
| Win | 4. | 20 January 1997 | Ourense, Spain | Hard (i) | (Netherlands) Linda Sentis | 6–3, 6–2 |
| Win | 5. | 14 April 1997 | Elvas, Portugal | Hard | (Spain) Paula Hermida | 6–4, 6–3 |
| Loss | 6. | 25 August 1997 | Orbetello, Italy | Clay | (Czech Republic) Radka Bobková | 2–6, 4–6 |
| Loss | 7. | 1 September 1997 | Spoleto, Italy | Clay | (Italy) Laura Garrone | w/o |
| Loss | 8. | 20 April 1998 | Espinho, Portugal | Clay | (Spain) Mariam Ramon Climent | 0–6, 2–6 |
| Win | 9. | 9 November 1998 | San Salvador, El Salvador | Clay | (Switzerland) Aliénor Tricerri | 6–1, 6–0 |
| Win | 10. | 20 November 2000 | ITF Manila, Philippines | Clay | (South Korea) Chae Kyung-yee | 5–3, 4–2 |

=== Doubles: 38 (24–14) ===
| Result | No. | Date | Tournament | Surface | Partner | Opponents | Score |
|---|---|---|---|---|---|---|---|
| Loss | 1. | 22 March 1993 | ITF Madrid, Spain | Clay | (Spain) Vanessa Castellano | (Czech Republic) Dominika Gorecká (Czech Republic) Lenka Němečková | 4–6, 4–6 |
| Loss | 2. | 26 April 1993 | Porto, Portugal | Clay | (Spain) Vanessa Castellano | (Spain) Eva Bes (Spain) Eva Jiménez | 7–5, 1–6, 3–6 |
| Loss | 3. | 14 March 1994 | Zaragoza, Spain | Clay | (Slovakia) Patrícia Marková | (Czech Republic) Jindra Gabrisova (Czech Republic) Dominika Gorecká | 5–7, 7–5, 4–6 |
| Win | 4. | 2 May 1994 | Balaguer, Spain | Clay | (Spain) Cristina Torrens Valero | (Spain) Rosa María Pérez (Argentina) Valentina Solari | 6–1, 6–1 |
| Win | 5. | 9 May 1994 | Mollet, Spain | Clay | (Spain) Cristina Torrens Valero | (Argentina) Mariana Randrup (Argentina) Cintia Tortorella | 6–4, 6–0 |
| Win | 6. | 30 May 1994 | Barcelona, Spain | Hard | (Spain) Cristina Torrens Valero | (Switzerland) Emmanuelle Gagliardi (Czech Republic) Petra Kučová | 3–6, 6–2, 6–2 |
| Win | 7. | 4 September 1995 | Cáceres, Spain | Clay | (Spain) Cristina Torrens Valero | (Spain) Patricia Aznar (Spain) Eva Bes | 6–2, 6–3 |
| Win | 8. | 16 June 1996 | Salzburg, Austria | Clay | (Argentina) Veronica Stele | (Switzerland) Emmanuelle Gagliardi (Portugal) Sofia Prazeres | 6–0, 6–4 |
| Win | 9. | 14 July 1996 | Vigo, Spain | Clay | (Argentina) Veronica Stele | (Israel) Nataly Cahana (Israel) Hila Rosen | 6–2, 6–4 |
| Win | 10. | 21 July 1996 | Bilbao, Spain | Clay | (Argentina) Veronica Stele | (Spain) Marta Cano (Spain) Nuria Montero | 6–3, 6–4 |
| Loss | 11. | 2 September 1996 | Spoleto, Italy | Clay | (Dominican Republic) Joelle Schad | (Brazil) Miriam D'Agostini (Portugal) Sofia Prazeres | 5–7, 4–6 |
| Win | 12. | 13 January 1997 | Pontevedra, Spain | Hard (i) | (Portugal) Sofia Prazeres | (Italy) Tathiana Garbin (Italy) Sara Ventura | 4–6, 6–1, 6–4 |
| Win | 13. | 20 January 1997 | Ourense, Spain | Hard (i) | (Portugal) Sofia Prazeres | (Netherlands) Linda Sentis (Netherlands) Susanne Trik | 6–2, 6–3 |
| Loss | 14. | 14 April 1997 | Elvas, Portugal | Hard | (Brazil) Miriam D'Agostini | (Canada) Aneta Soukup (Norway) Tina Samara | 4–6, 5–7 |
| Loss | 15. | 2 June 1997 | Tashkent, Uzbekistan | Hard | (Israel) Hila Rosen | (United States) Erika deLone (Australia) Nicole Pratt | 3–6, 1–6 |
| Loss | 16. | 14 July 1997 | Getxo, Spain | Clay | (Israel) Hila Rosen | (Netherlands) Amanda Hopmans (Belgium) Patty Van Acker | 5–7, 6–4, 5–7 |
| Win | 17. | 4 August 1997 | Carthage, Tunisia | Clay | (Slovakia) Zuzana Váleková | (Spain) Eva Bes (Spain) Elena Salvador | 4–6, 6–4, 6–4 |
| Win | 18. | 20 October 1997 | Ceuta, Spain | Hard | (Spain) Patricia Aznar | (Spain) Ainhoa Goñi (Spain) Yaiza Goñi | w/o |
| Win | 19. | 26 July 1998 | Dublin, Ireland | Hard | (Germany) Kirstin Freye | (Australia) Lisa McShea (Australia) Trudi Musgrave | w/o |
| Loss | 20. | 2 November 1998 | Mogi das Cruzes, Brazil | Clay | (Argentina) Luciana Masante | (Spain) Eva Bes (Argentina) María Fernanda Landa | 6–4, 2–6, 2–6 |
| Win | 21. | 9 November 1998 | San Salvador, El Salvador | Clay | (United Kingdom) Joanne Moore | (United States) Susie Starrett (Switzerland) Aliénor Tricerri | 6–3, 3–6, 6–1 |
| Win | 22. | 22 November 1998 | Caracas, Venezuela | Hard | (Brazil) Vanessa Menga | (Canada) Maureen Drake (Germany) Caroline Schneider | 6–3, 5–7, 6–3 |
| Loss | 23. | 7 December 1998 | Cali, Colombia | Clay | (Argentina) Laura Montalvo | (Slovenia) Katarina Srebotnik (Slovakia) Zuzana Váleková | 6–2, 3–6, 2–6 |
| Win | 24. | 26 April 1999 | Espinho, Portugal | Clay | (Hungary) Katalin Marosi | (Italy) Francesca Lubiani (Italy) Maria Paola Zavagli | 6–3, 6–4 |
| Loss | 25. | 12 July 1999 | Getxo, Spain | Clay | (Spain) Gisela Riera | (Spain) Conchita Martínez Granados (Spain) Rosa María Andrés Rodríguez | 6–7^{(4)}, 4–6 |
| Loss | 26. | 30 August 1999 | Fano, Italy | Clay | (Hungary) Katalin Marosi | (Netherlands) Debby Haak (Netherlands) Andrea van den Hurk | 1–6, 4–6 |
| Loss | 27. | 27 September 1999 | Porto, Portugal | Clay | (Czech Republic) Michaela Paštiková | (Spain) Lourdes Domínguez Lino (Spain) María José Martínez Sánchez | 6–3, 2–6, 1–6 |
| Loss | 28. | 11 October 1999 | Rhodes, Greece | Clay | (Czech Republic) Lenka Cenková | (Italy) Tathiana Garbin (Netherlands) Amanda Hopmans | 6–4, 0–6, 6–7^{(3)} |
| Win | 29. | 3 April 2000 | Cagliari, Italy | Clay | (Spain) Lourdes Domínguez Lino | (Czech Republic) Michaela Paštiková (Germany) Jasmin Wöhr | 7–5, 3–6, 6–3 |
| Win | 30. | 12 June 2000 | Grado, Italy | Clay | (Brazil) Vanessa Menga | (Spain) Lourdes Domínguez Lino (Spain) María José Martínez Sánchez | 3–6, 7–5, 6–1 |
| Win | 31. | 19 June 2000 | Grado, Italy | Clay | (Brazil) Vanessa Menga | (Spain) Maja Matevžič (Serbia and Montenegro) Dragana Zarić | 4–6, 6–4, 6–1 |
| Win | 32. | 3 July 2000 | Mont-de-Marsan, France | Clay | (Spain) Eva Bes | (Argentina) Eugenia Chialvo (Argentina) Jorgelina Cravero | 6–2, 6–2 |
| Win | 33. | 10 July 2000 | Getxo, Spain | Clay | (Croatia) Maja Palaveršić | (Spain) Lourdes Domínguez Lino (Spain) María José Martínez Sánchez | 6–1, 6–2 |
| Win | 34. | 17 July 2000 | Valladolid, Spain | Clay | (Spain) María José Martínez Sánchez | (Australia) Trudi Musgrave (United Kingdom) Lorna Woodroffe | 6–2, 6–4 |
| Win | 35. | 7 August 2000 | Carthage, Tunisia | Clay | (Brazil) Vanessa Menga | (Austria) Bianca Kamper (Russia) Ekaterina Kozhokina | 6–2, 6–1 |
| Loss | 36. | 4 September 2000 | Fano, Italy | Clay | (Greece) Eleni Daniilidou | (Spain) Conchita Martínez Granados (Spain) Rosa María Andrés Rodríguez | 2–6, 4–6 |
| Win | 37. | 18 September 2000 | Lecce, Italy | Clay | (Spain) Eva Bes | (Germany) Angelika Rösch (Germany) Syna Schmidle | 6–4, 6–0 |
| Win | 38. | 2 April 2001 | ITF Juárez, Mexico | Clay | (Venezuela) Milagros Sequera | (Argentina) Erica Krauth (Argentina) Vanesa Krauth | 6–4, 2–6, 6–2 |
