= Désirée Leupold =

Austrian tennis player

- Country (sports): Austria
- Born: 11 November 1972 (age 52)
- Prize money: $14,246

Singles
- Highest ranking: No. 375 (3 December 1990)

Doubles
- Highest ranking: No. 357 (10 April 1995)

Désirée Leupold (born 11 November 1972) is an Austrian former professional tennis player.

Leupold played on the professional tour in the 1990s and reached a best singles ranking of 375 in the world. She featured in four WTA Tour main draws as a doubles player, otherwise spending her career on the ITF Circuit.

== ITF finals ==
$25,000 tournaments
$10,000 tournaments

=== Singles: 2 (0–2) ===
Result	No.	Date	Tournament	Surface	Opponent	Score
Loss	1.	4 June 1990	Lisbon, Portugal	Clay	(West Germany) Katja Oeljeklaus	6–0, 2–6, 1–6
Loss	2.	19 November 1990	Florianópolis, Brazil	Clay	(Brazil) Andrea Vieira	4–6, 4–6

=== Doubles: 5 (0–5) ===
Result	No.	Date	Tournament	Surface	Partner	Opponents	Score
Loss	1.	25 April 1994	Neudörfl, Austria	Clay	(Austria) Sandra Reichel	(Czech Republic) Monika Kratochvílová (Czech Republic) Zdeňka Málková	0–6, 6–4, 1–6
Loss	2.	6 June 1994	Elvas, Portugal	Hard	(Spain) Janet Souto	(Belgium) Ann Devries (Portugal) Sofia Prazeres	2–6, 6–4, 5–7
Loss	3.	20 November 1995	Mallorca 3, Spain	Clay	(Portugal) Joana Pedroso	(Hungary) Kira Nagy (Hungary) Andrea Noszály	4–6, 6–7
Loss	4.	27 November 1995	Mallorca 4, Spain	Clay	(Portugal) Joana Pedroso	(Italy) Laura Fodorean (Romania) Maria Popescu	4–6, 0–6
Loss	5.	27 May 1996	Barcelona, Spain	Clay	(Spain) Gisela Riera	(Spain) Marta Cano (Spain) Nuria Montero	5–7, 6–3, 1–6
