= Conchita Martínez Granados =

Spanish tennis player (born 1976)

- Country (sports): Spain
- Residence: Barcelona
- Born: 20 January 1976 (age 49); Barcelona
- Height: 1.71 m (5 ft 7 in)
- Turned pro: 1992
- Retired: 2007
- Plays: Right-handed (two-handed backhand)
- Prize money: $618,599

Singles
- Career record: 376–283
- Career titles: 0 WTA, 12 ITF
- Highest ranking: No. 66 (5 May 2003)

Grand Slam singles results
- Australian Open: 2R (2006)
- French Open: 2R (2002, 2006)
- Wimbledon: 2R (2003)
- US Open: 1R (2002, 2003, 2006)

Doubles
- Career record: 116–144
- Career titles: 17 ITF
- Highest ranking: No. 82 (23 June 2003)

Grand Slam doubles results
- Australian Open: 3R (2003)
- French Open: 1R (2000, 2001, 2003, 2004, 2006)
- Wimbledon: 1R (2003)
- US Open: 2R (2002, 2004)

Conchita Martínez Granados (born 20 January 1976) is a former professional female tennis player from Spain.

== WTA Tour finals ==
=== Singles (0–1) ===
Legend
Tier I (0–0)
Tier II (0–0)
Tier III (0–1)
Tier IV & V (0–0)

Result	No.	Date	Tournament	Surface	Opponent	Score
Loss	1.	May 2003	Croatian Bol Ladies Open	Clay	(Russia) Vera Zvonareva	1–6, 3–6

=== Doubles (0–3) ===
Legend
Tier I (0–0)
Tier II (0–0)
Tier III (0–1)
Tier IV & V (0–2)

Result	No.	Date	Tournament	Surface	Partner	Opponents	Score
Loss	1.	Jul 2002	Morocco Open	Clay	(Argentina) Gisela Dulko	(Hungary) Petra Mandula (Austria) Patricia Wartusch	2–6, 1–6
Loss	2.	Apr 2003	Budapest, Hungary	Clay	(Ukraine) Tatiana Perebiynis	(Hungary) Petra Mandula (Ukraine) Elena Tatarkova	3–6, 1–6
Loss	3.	Feb 2005	Mexican Open	Clay	(Spain) Rosa María Andrés Rodríguez	(Russia) Alina Jidkova (Ukraine) Tatiana Perebiynis	5–7, 3–6

== ITF Circuit finals ==
Legend
$75,000 tournaments
$50,000 tournaments
$40,000 tournaments
$25,000 tournaments
$10,000 tournaments

=== Singles (12–8) ===
Result	No.	Date	Tournament	Surface	Opponent	Score
Loss	1.	8 May 1995	Bossonnens, Switzerland	Clay	(Austria) Barbara Schwartz	6–3, 1–6, 3–6
Win	1.	21 August 1995	Brussels, Belgium	Clay	(Spain) Magüi Serna	6–0, 6–4
Loss	2.	29 January 1996	Mallorca, Spain	Clay	(Austria) Sandra Mantler	5–7, 7–6, 0–6
Win	2.	11 March 1996	Zaragoza, Spain	Clay	(Spain) Eva Bes	3–6, 6–1, 6–3
Win	3.	13 July 1997	Vigo, Spain	Clay	(Spain) Nuria Montero	6–2, 6–4
Loss	3.	5 October 1997	Lerida, Spain	Clay	(Netherlands) Kim de Weille	6–7, 2–6
Loss	4.	2 November 1997	Mogi das Cruzes, Brazil	Clay	(Argentina) Mariana Díaz Oliva	0–6, 0–6
Win	4.	1 December 1997	Mallorca, Spain	Clay	(Spain) Eva Bes	6–3, 5–7, 6–3
Loss	5.	11 October 1998	Santiago, Chile	Clay	(Argentina) Paola Suárez	6–3, 4–6, 1–6
Win	5.	6 November 2000	Granada, Spain	Clay	(Spain) Vanessa Devesa	1–4, 3–1, 5–4
Win	6.	5 March 2001	Saltillo, Mexico	Hard	(Uruguay) Daniela Olivera	2–6, 6–4, 6–1
Loss	6.	19 March 2001	Matamoros, Mexico	Hard	(Austria) Petra Russegger	6–4, 1–6, 5–7
Win	7.	23 September 2001	São José dos Campos, Brazil	Clay	(Netherlands) Seda Noorlander	7–5, 6–4
Win	8.	29 April 2002	Maglie, Italy	Clay	(Russia) Ekaterina Sysoeva	6–1, 6–1
Win	9.	19 May 2002	Bromma, Sweden	Hard	(Australia) Amanda Grahame	6–7, 6–3, 6–2
Win	10.	16 June 2002	Marseille, France	Clay	(France) Émilie Loit	6–2, 3–6, 7–5
Loss	7.	22 June 2004	Fontanafredda, Italy	Clay	(Russia) Lioudmila Skavronskaia	1–6, 3–6
Win	11.	6 June 2005	Marseille, France	Clay	(Canada) Marie-Ève Pelletier	6–1, 6–1
Loss	8.	10 July 2005	Cuneo, Italy	Clay	(Spain) Laura Pous Tió	3–6, 2–6
Win	12.	22 October 2005	Seville, Spain	Clay	(Serbia and Montenegro) Ana Timotić	6–2, 6–2

=== Doubles (17–24) ===
Result	No.	Date	Tournament	Surface	Partner	Opponents	Score
Win	1.	10 May 1993	Barcelona, Spain	Clay	(Germany) Claudia Timm	(Spain) Ana Salas Lozano (Argentina) María Fernanda Landa	7–5, 1–6, 6–2
Loss	1.	29 January 1996	Mallorca, Spain	Clay	(Spain) Marina Escobar	(Spain) Rosa María Andrés Rodríguez (Spain) Laura García	7–5, 0–6, 2–6
Loss	2.	4 May 1997	Balaguer, Spain	Clay	(Argentina) Celeste Contín	(Spain) Nuria Montero (Spain) Lourdes Domínguez Lino	6–0, 2–6, 4–6
Loss	3.	7 July 1997	Vigo, Spain	Clay	(Spain) Gisela Riera	(Spain) Lourdes Domínguez Lino (Spain) Nuria Montero	3–6, 0–6
Win	2.	6 October 1997	Gerona, Spain	Clay	(Spain) Gisela Riera	(Spain) Lourdes Domínguez Lino (Spain) Nuria Montero	2–6, 6–3, 6–4
Loss	4.	3 November 1997	Suzano, Brazil	Clay	(Spain) Gisela Riera	(Paraguay) Laura Bernal (Paraguay) Larissa Schaerer	6–3, 3–6, 6–7^{(4)}
Loss	5.	7 December 1997	Mallorca, Spain	Clay	(Spain) Marta Cano	(Hungary) Katalin Marosi (Austria) Melanie Schnell	4–6, 6–4, 5–7
Loss	6.	15 February 1998	Mallorca, Spain	Clay	(Italy) Alice Canepa	(Germany) Eva Belbl (Germany) Silke Frankl	3–6, 3–6
Loss	7.	22 March 1998	Reims, France	Clay	(Spain) Eva Bes	(Netherlands) Amanda Hopmans (Belgium) Daphne van de Zande	4–6, 3–6
Loss	8.	23 November 1998	Lima, Peru	Clay	(Italy) Alice Canepa	(Slovenia) Katarina Srebotnik (Slovakia) Zuzana Váleková	7–6^{(4)}, 5–7, 4–6
Loss	9.	5 July 1999	Civitanova, Italy	Clay	(Spain) Rosa María Andrés Rodríguez	(Denmark) Eva Dyrberg (Slovakia) Daniela Hantuchová	6–7^{(3)}, 6–4, 4–6
Win	3.	12 July 1999	Getxo, Spain	Clay	(Spain) Rosa María Andrés Rodríguez	(Spain) Gisela Riera (Spain) Alicia Ortuño	7–6^{(4)}, 6–4
Win	4.	30 August 1999	Denain, France	Clay	(Spain) Rosa María Andrés Rodríguez	(Spain) Mariam Ramón Climent (Argentina) Luciana Masante	6–1, 6–4
Win	5.	20 September 1999	Sofia, Bulgaria	Clay	(Spain) Rosa María Andrés Rodríguez	(Hungary) Katalin Marosi (Belarus) Nadejda Ostrovskaya	w/o
Loss	10.	15 May 2000	Porto, Portugal	Clay	(Spain) Rosa María Andrés Rodríguez	(Spain) Eva Bes (Spain) Gisela Riera	3–6, 3–6
Win	6.	3 July 2000	Civitanova, Italy	Clay	(Spain) Rosa María Andrés Rodríguez	(Russia) Evgenia Kulikovskaya (Belarus) Tatiana Poutchek	6–2, 6–3
Win	7.	23 July 2000	Fontanafredda, Italy	Clay	(Spain) Rosa María Andrés Rodríguez	(Slovenia) Maja Matevžič (Italy) Antonella Serra Zanetti	4–6, 6–2, 6–4
Win	8.	4 September 2000	Fano, Italy	Clay	(Spain) Rosa María Andrés Rodríguez	(Greece) Eleni Daniilidou (Spain) Alicia Ortuño	6–2, 6–4
Loss	11.	6 November 2000	Granada, Spain	Clay	(Serbia and Montenegro) Branka Bojović	(Argentina) Erica Krauth (Argentina) Vanessa Krauth	0–4, 2–4, 1–4
Loss	12.	10 December 2000	Bogotá, Colombia	Hard	(Argentina) Clarisa Fernández	(Brazil) Joana Cortez (Argentina) Mariana Díaz Oliva	6–3, 1–6, 2–6
Win	9.	5 March 2001	Saltillo, Mexico	Hard	(Argentina) Melisa Arévalo	(United States) Courtenay Chapman (United States) Melissa Middleton	7–6^{(3)}, 0–6, 6–1
Loss	13.	26 March 2001	Ciudad Victoria, Mexico	Hard	(Argentina) Melisa Arévalo	(Uruguay) Daniela Olivera (Argentina) Luciana Masante	4–6, 5–7
Win	10.	15 April 2001	San Luis Potosí, Mexico	Clay	(Argentina) Eugenia Chialvo	(Brazil) Joana Cortez (Argentina) Clarisa Fernández	6–7^{(3)}, 6–1, 6–1
Loss	14.	22 April 2001	Coatzacoalcos, Mexico	Hard	(Argentina) Eugenia Chialvo	(Argentina) Erica Krauth (Argentina) Vanesa Krauth	1–6, 4–6
Loss	15.	21 July 2001	Modena, Italy	Clay	(Argentina) Eugenia Chialvo	(Russia) Galina Fokina (Belarus) Nadejda Ostrovskaya	3–6, 2–6
Loss	16.	16 September 2001	Bordeaux, France	Clay	(Italy) Antonella Serra Zanetti	(Serbia) Sandra Načuk (Serbia) Dragana Zarić	2–6, 6–7^{(6)}
Loss	17.	17 September 2001	São José dos Campos, Brazil	Clay	(Brazil) Joana Cortez	(Brazil) Vanessa Menga (Uruguay) Daniela Olivera	6–4, 5–7, 3–6
Loss	18.	30 September 2001	Verona, Italy	Clay	(Spain) Lourdes Domínguez Lino	(Estonia) Maret Ani (Czech Republic) Michaela Paštiková	7–6^{(4)}, 4–6, 6–7^{(5)}
Win	11.	6 May 2002	Edinburgh, United Kingdom	Clay	(Republic of Ireland) Kelly Liggan	(United Kingdom) Victoria Davies (Czech Republic) Eva Martincová	5–7, 6–0, 6–1
Win	12.	16 June 2002	Marseille, France	Clay	(Spain) Lourdes Domínguez Lino	(Germany) Sandra Klösel (Germany) Vanessa Henke	7–5, 4–6, 6–0
Loss	19.	14 July 2002	Modena, Italy	Clay	(Argentina) Gisela Dulko	(Ukraine) Yuliana Fedak (Russia) Galina Fokina	1–6, 3–6
Win	13.	7 September 2003	Fano, Italy	Clay	(Italy) Giulia Casoni	(Spain) Gala León García (Argentina) María Emilia Salerni	6–3, 6–3
Win	14.	5 October 2003	Girona, Spain	Clay	(Spain) María José Martínez Sánchez	(Bulgaria) Lubomira Bacheva (Italy) Roberta Vinci	7–5, 6–3
Win	15.	25 April 2004	Bari, Italy	Clay	(Spain) Rosa María Andrés Rodríguez	(Germany) Martina Müller (Czech Republic) Vladimíra Uhlířová	6–2, 5–7, 6–2
Loss	20.	7 June 2004	Marseille, France	Clay	(France) Kildine Chevalier	(Israel) Shahar Peer (Russia) Elena Vesnina	1–6, 1–6
Loss	21.	7 August 2005	Martina Franca, Italy	Clay	(Spain) Lourdes Domínguez Lino	(Hungary) Zsófia Gubacsi (Ukraine) Mariya Koryttseva	1–6, 3–6
Win	16.	18 September 2005	Bordeaux, France	Clay	(Spain) María José Martínez Sánchez	(Germany) Julia Schruff (Germany) Jasmin Wöhr	7–5, 6–2
Loss	22.	3 October 2005	Barcelona, Spain	Clay	(Spain) María José Martínez Sánchez	(Spain) Lourdes Domínguez Lino (Spain) María Sánchez Lorenzo	5–7, 7–6^{(4)}, 6–7^{(3)}
Loss	23.	30 October 2005	Sant Cugat, Spain	Clay	(Spain) María José Martínez Sánchez	(Spain) Lourdes Domínguez Lino (Spain) Arantxa Parra Santonja	4–6, 3–6
Win	17.	18 June 2006	Marseille, France	Clay	(Spain) María José Martínez Sánchez	(France) Séverine Beltrame (France) Stéphanie Cohen-Aloro	7–5, 6–4
Loss	24.	30 June 2007	Getxo, Spain	Clay	(Argentina) María Emilia Salerni	(Spain) Nuria Llagostera Vives (Spain) Laura Pous Tió	2–6, 1–6

== Grand Slam performance timelines ==
Key
W	F	SF	QF	#R	RR	Q#	DNQ	A	NH

(W) winner; (F) finalist; (SF) semifinalist; (QF) quarterfinalist; (#R) rounds 4, 3, 2, 1; (RR) round-robin stage; (Q#) qualification round; (DNQ) did not qualify; (A) absent; (NH) not held; (SR) strike rate (events won / competed); (W–L) win–loss record.

=== Singles ===
Tournament	1998	1999	2000	2001	2002	2003	2004	2005	2006	2007	W–L
Australian Open	Q1	1R	Q1	Q1	A	1R	1R	Q2	2R	A	1–4
French Open	Q3	Q1	Q2	1R	2R	1R	1R	Q2	2R	Q2	2–5
Wimbledon	Q1	A	A	A	A	2R	Q1	Q1	1R	A	1–2
US Open	Q3	Q1	Q1	Q1	1R	1R	Q1	Q1	1R	A	0–3
Win–loss	0–0	0–1	0–0	0–1	1–2	1–4	0–2	0–0	2–4	0–0	4–14
