= Kira Nagy =

Hungarian tennis player (born 1977)

- Country (sports): Hungary
- Residence: Budapest, Hungary
- Born: 29 December 1977 (age 48) Budapest
- Height: 1.76 m (5 ft 9 in)
- Turned pro: 1994
- Retired: 2014
- Plays: Right (two-handed backhand)
- Prize money: $388,234

Singles
- Career record: 416–284
- Career titles: 18 ITF
- Highest ranking: No. 122 (31 July 2006)

Grand Slam singles results
- US Open: 1R (2000, 2007)

Doubles
- Career record: 153–148
- Career titles: 10 ITF
- Highest ranking: No. 96 (19 July 2004)

Grand Slam doubles results
- French Open: 1R (2004)
- Wimbledon: 1R (2004)
- US Open: 1R (2004)

Kira Nagy (born 29 December 1977) is a former tennis player from Hungary. During her professional years, she won 18 singles titles and ten doubles titles at tournaments of the ITF Women's Circuit.

Nagy was coached 1991–1995 by Miklos Hornok, and later by Otto Temesvari and Miklos Jancso.

She won her first match on the WTA Tour in 2007 at the Palermo Ladies Open, defeating German player Tatjana Malek 6–2, 7–5, before losing to Émilie Loit.

Nagy competed in the 2007 US Open, where she drew Venus Williams in the first round, losing 2–6, 1–6. This was her second Grand Slam tournament, after qualifying for the US Open in 2000.

She retired from pro tour 2014.

== ITF Circuit finals ==
Legend
$100,000 tournaments
$75,000 tournaments
$50,000 tournaments
$25,000 tournaments
$10,000 tournaments

=== Singles: 33 (18 titles, 15 runner-ups) ===
Result	No.	Date	Tournament	Surface	Opponent	Score
Win	1.	Oct 1994	ITF Mali Lošinj, Croatia	Clay	(Czech Republic) Radka Surová	6–4, 6–2
Lost	1.	Oct 1994	ITF Nicosia, Cyprus	Clay	(Czech Republic) Lenka Cenková	6–2, 6–3
Loss	2.	Nov 1994	ITF Le Havre, France	Clay	(Netherlands) Lara Bitter	6–3, 7–5
Win	2.	Nov 1995	ITF Mallorca, Spain	Clay (i)	(Hungary) Andrea Noszály	6–4, 6–3
Loss	3.	Dec 1995	ITF Mallorca, Spain	Clay (i)	(Spain) Magüi Serna	6–4, 6–3
Win	3.	Sep 1997	ITF Madrid, Spain	Clay	(Spain) Nuria Montero	6–1, 6–0
Loss	4.	Oct 1997	ITF Nicosia, Cyprus	Clay	(Czech Republic) Eva Krejčová	6–3, 2–6, 6–4
Win	4.	Apr 1998	ITF Athens, Greece	Clay	(Greece) Christína Papadáki	7–5, 2–6, 6–3
Win	5.	Apr 1998	Dubai Tennis Challenge, United Arab Emirates	Hard	(Indonesia) Wynne Prakusya	6–4, 6–1
Loss	5.	Jul 1998	ITF Getxo, Spain	Clay	(Spain) Ángeles Montolio	7–6^{(7)}, 7–6^{(7)}
Win	6.	Nov 1999	ITF Monterrey, Mexico	Hard	(United States) Ansley Cargill	6–4, 6–2
Win	7.	Nov 1999	ITF Campos, Brazil	Clay	(Brazil) Miriam D'Agostini	5–7, 6–3, 6–2
Win	8.	May 2000	ITF Guimarães, Portugal	Hard	(Morocco) Bahia Mouhtassine	6–0, 5–7, 7–6
Win	9.	Jun 2000	ITF Lenzerheide, Switzerland	Clay	(Ukraine) Julia Vakulenko	6–2, 3–6, 7–6
Win	10.	Oct 2001	Open de Touraine, France	Hard (i)	(France) Anne-Laure Heitz	1–6, 6–4, 6–0
Loss	6.	Oct 2002	ITF Cairo, Egypt	Hard (i)	(Czech Republic) Barbora Záhlavová-Strýcová	6–2, 6–0
Win	11.	Sep 2003	ITF Jounieh Open, Lebanon	Clay	(Serbia and Montenegro) Ana Timotić	6–1, 7–5
Win	12.	Nov 2003	ITF Mexico City	Hard	(Hungary) Melinda Czink	6–2, 6–3
Loss	7.	Oct 2004	ITF Sevilla, Spain	Clay	(Spain) Laura Pous Tió	7–5, 6–1
Loss	8.	Jan 2005	Dubai Tennis Challenge, United Arab Emirates	Hard	(Austria) Sandra Klemenschits	6–4, 6–1
Loss	9.	Mar 2005	ITF San Luis Potosí, Mexico	Clay	(Austria) Yvonne Meusburger	7–5, 5–7, 6–3
Loss	10.	Apr 2005	ITF Taranto, Italy	Clay	(Italy) Mara Santangelo	6–1, 6–0
Loss	11.	Jun 2005	ITF Stuttgart, Germany	Clay	(Germany) Vanessa Henke	6–2, 0–6, 6–4
Loss	12.	Sep 2005	Save Cup, Italy	Clay	(Slovakia) Magdaléna Rybáriková	6–2, 7–5
Loss	13.	Nov 2005	ITF Mexico City	Clay	(Switzerland) Romina Oprandi	6–3, 6–0
Win	13.	Apr 2006	ITF Poza Rica, Mexico	Hard	(Hungary) Zsófia Gubacsi	6–4, 6–2
Win	14.	Jun 2006	Zagreb Ladies Open, Croatia	Clay	(Italy) Tathiana Garbin	7–6, 3–6, 7–6
Win	15.	Jul 2006	ITF Rome, Italy	Clay	(France) Alizé Cornet	6–2, 6–7, 6–4
Win	16.	Jun 2007	Zagreb Ladies Open, Croatia	Clay	(Croatia) Ivana Lisjak	2–6, 7–6, 6–2
Win	17.	Jun 2007	ITF Campobasso, Italy	Clay	(Australia) Christina Wheeler	6–2, 6–0
Win	18.	Jul 2007	ITF Istanbul, Turkey	Hard	(Brazil) Maria Fernanda Alves	6–7, 7–5, 6–1
Loss	14.	Oct 2007	ITF Sant Cugat del Vallès, Spain	Clay	(Spain) Nuria Llagostera Vives	6–2, 6–4
Loss	15.	Nov 2007	ITF Sintra, Portugal	Clay	(Germany) Kathrin Wörle	6–3, 6–2

=== Doubles: 22 (10 titles, 12 runner-ups) ===
Result	No.	Date	Tournament	Surface	Partner	Opponents	Score
Win	1.	Nov 1995	ITF Mallorca, Spain	Clay	(Hungary) Andrea Noszály	(Austria) Désirée Leupold (Portugal) Joana Pedroso	6–4, 7–6
Loss	1.	Jun 1996	ITF Maribor, Slovenia	Clay	(Hungary) Andrea Noszály	(Romania) Alida Gallovits (Romania) Alice Pirsu	4–6, 5–7
Win	2.	Oct 2002	ITF Cairo, Egypt	Clay	(Sweden) Maria Wolfbrandt	(India) Rushmi Chakravarthi (India) Sai Jayalakshmy Jayaram	6–2, 6–1
Win	3.	Jul 2003	ITF Innsbruck, Austria	Clay	(Sweden) Maria Wolfbrandt	(Hungary) Melinda Czink (Italy) Mara Santangelo	6–4, 4–6, 6–4
Win	4.	Sep 2003	ITF Jounieh Open, Lebanon	Clay	(Germany) Isabel Collischonn	(Germany) Antonia Matic (Germany) Stefanie Weis	6–4, 7–6
Win	5.	Oct 2003	Dubai Tennis Challenge, United Arab Emirates	Hard	(Hungary) Zsófia Gubacsi	(Italy) Flavia Pennetta (Italy) Adriana Serra Zanetti	2–6, 6–2, 6–2
Loss	2.	Feb 2004	ITF Warsaw, Poland	Hard (i)	(Hungary) Zsófia Gubacsi	(Poland) Klaudia Jans (Poland) Alicja Rosolska	4–6, 3–6
Loss	3.	Mar 2004	ITF Athens, Greece	Hard	(Hungary) Zsófia Gubacsi	(Latvia) Līga Dekmeijere (Germany) Martina Müller	2–6, 6–1, 4–6
Loss	4.	Jun 2004	ITF Vaduz, Liechtenstein	Clay	(Sweden) Maria Wolfbrandt	(Belarus) Tatiana Poutchek (Australia) Anastasia Rodionova	3–6, 4–6
Win	6.	Jul 2004	Bella Cup Toruń, Poland	Clay	(Czech Republic) Gabriela Chmelinová	(Germany) Angelique Kerber (Poland) Marta Leśniak	6–4, 7–6
Win	7.	Sep 2004	ITF Sofia, Bulgaria	Clay	(Hungary) Virág Németh	(Romania) Gabriela Niculescu (Czech Republic) Sandra Záhlavová	2–6, 6–2, 7–5
Loss	5.	Oct 2004	ITF Seville, Spain	Clay	(Hungary) Virág Németh	(Spain) Lourdes Domínguez Lino (Spain) Laura Pous Tió	2–6, 3–6
Win	8.	Sep 2005	Save Cup Mestre, Italy	Clay	(Hungary) Rita Kuti-Kis	(Italy) Elisa Balsamo (Italy) Emily Stellato	7–5, 6–4
Loss	6.	Mar 2006	ITF Poza Rica, Mexico	Hard	(Hungary) Zsófia Gubacsi	(Czech Republic) Renata Voráčová (Croatia) Matea Mezak	2–6, 0–1 ret.
Loss	7.	May 2006	ITF Galatina, Italy	Clay	(Italy) Valentina Sassi	(Montenegro) Danica Krstajić (Czech Republic) Renata Voráčová	4–6, 0–6
Loss	8.	Jul 2006	ITF Rome, Italy	Clay	(Croatia) Darija Jurak	(Croatia) Matea Mezak (Croatia) Nika Ožegović	2–6, 3–6
Loss	9.	Sep 2006	ITF Bordeaux, France	Clay	(Germany) Jasmin Wöhr	(France) Stéphanie Foretz (Germany) Julia Schruff	6–7, 5–7
Win	9.	Aug 2007	ITF Coimbra, Portugal	Hard	(Portugal) Neuza Silva	(Poland) Magdalena Kiszczyńska (Belgium) Yanina Wickmayer	6–3, 3–6, 7–5
Loss	10.	Sep 2007	ITF Lecce, Italy	Clay	(Italy) Valentina Sassi	(France) Claire de Gubernatis (Germany) Tatjana Priachin	3–6, 2–6
Loss	11.	Oct 2007	ITF Sant Cugat, Spain	Clay	(France) Aurélie Védy	(Spain) Nuria Llagostera Vives (Spain) María José Martínez Sánchez	4–6, 1–6
Win	10.	May 2008	ITF Florence, Italy	Clay	(Italy) Valentina Sassi	(Kyrgyzstan) Ksenia Palkina (Italy) Martina Caciotti	6–2, 6–3
Loss	12.	Sep 2008	Maribor Open, Slovenia	Clay	(Belarus) Anastasiya Yakimova	(Germany) Carmen Klaschka (Germany) Andrea Petkovic	0–6, 6–2, [3–10]

== ITF Junior Circuit ==
Category G2
Category G3
Category G4
Category G5

=== Singles (3–2) ===
Outcome	No.	Date	Tournament	Grade	Surface	Opponent	Score
Runner-up	1.	2 April 1994	Bat Yam, Israel	G4	Hard	(Israel) Nataly Cahana	4–6, 6–4, 5–7
Runner-up	2.	7 April 1994	Beersheba, Israel	G5	Hard	(Hungary) Réka Vidáts	4–6, 1–6
Winner	1.	17 April 1994	Umag, Croatia	G3	Clay	(Hungary) Réka Vidáts	7–5, ret.
Winner	2.	1 May 1994	St. Pölten, Austria	G3	Clay	(Austria) Nina Schwarz	1–6, 6–2, 6–4
Winner	3.	5 March 1995	Nürnberg, Germany	G2	Carpet (i)	(Belarus) Olga Barabanschikova	5–7, 6–1, 6–1

=== Doubles (0–2) ===
Outcome	No.	Date	Tournament	Grade	Surface	Partner	Opponents	Score
Runner-up	1.	2 April 1994	Bat Yam, Israel	G4	Hard	(Hungary) Melinda Petkes	(Israel) Nataly Cahana (Israel) Hila Rosen	4–6, 1–6
Runner-up	2.	7 April 1994	Beersheba, Israel	G5	Hard	(Hungary) Melinda Petkes	(Slovakia) Martina Ondrejková (Slovakia) Zuzana Váleková	6–7, 3–6
