= Joana Pedroso =

Portuguese tennis player (born 1974)

- Country (sports): Portugal
- Born: 6 February 1974 (age 51)
- Prize money: $16,112

Singles
- Career record: 28–82
- Highest ranking: No. 488 (3 September 1990)

Doubles
- Career record: 59–69
- Career titles: 2 ITF
- Highest ranking: No. 266 (20 May 1996)

Joana Pedroso (born 6 February 1974) is a Portuguese former professional tennis player.

Pedroso was runner-up in the 1994 national singles championships to Sofia Prazeres, which whom she partnered to three national doubles championships. She was also a two-time national champion in mixed doubles.

While competing on the professional tour in the 1990s, Pedroso reached career best rankings of 488 in singles and 266 in doubles. She won two doubles titles on the ITF Women's Circuit. Between 1993 and 1997 she featured in 18 Fed Cup ties for Portugal, winning seven singles and nine doubles matches, from a total of 30 rubbers.

== ITF finals ==
=== Doubles: 6 (2–4) ===
Outcome	No.	Date	Tournament	Surface	Partner	Opponents	Score
Winner	1.	13 February 1994	Faro, Portugal	Hard	(France) Edith Nunes	(France) Olivia De Camaret (France) Severine Arpajou	7–5, 7–6^{(5)}
Winner	2.	25 June 1995	Elvas, Portugal	Hard	(Italy) Germana Di Natale	(United States) Bonnie Bleecker (Portugal) Manuela Costa	5–7, 7–5, 6–3
Runner-up	1.	26 November 1995	Mallorca 3, Spain	Clay	(Austria) Désirée Leupold	(Hungary) Kira Nagy (Hungary) Andrea Noszály	4–6, 6–7
Runner-up	2.	3 December 1995	Mallorca 4, Spain	Clay	(Austria) Désirée Leupold	(Italy) Laura Fodorean (Romania) Maria Popescu	4–6, 0–6
Runner-up	3.	12 May 1996	Santander, Spain	Clay	(Spain) Ana Salas Lozano	(Spain) Marta Cano (Spain) Nuria Montero	4–6, 4–6
Runner-up	4.	4 August 1996	Caserta, Italy	Clay	(Germany) Inga Bertschmann	(Netherlands) Marielle Bruens (Morocco) Bahia Mouhtassine	4–6, 4–6
