= Rosa María Pérez =

Spanish tennis player (born 1977)

- Country (sports): Spain
- Born: 8 April 1977 (age 48)
- Prize money: $15,876

Singles
- Career record: 52–59
- Career titles: 1 ITF
- Highest ranking: No. 340 (1 May 1995)

Doubles
- Career record: 30–35
- Career titles: 1 ITF
- Highest ranking: No. 341 (8 Aug 1994)

Rosa María Pérez (born 8 April 1977) is a Spanish former professional tennis player. She has also played on the Padel Pro Tour.

Pérez, a native of Alicante, achieved a career high singles ranking of 340 in the world, with her only WTA Tour main draw appearance coming as a qualifier at the 1995 Championships of Spain.

From 2000 to 2003, Pérez competed in varsity tennis for Texas Christian University.

== ITF finals ==
=== Singles: 2 (1–1) ===
Result	No.	Date	Tournament	Surface	Opponent	Score
Win	1.	8 May 1994	Balaguer, Spain	Clay	(France) Amélie Oudéa-Castéra	6–4, 6–4
Loss	1.	14 May 1995	Balaguer, Spain	Clay	(Brazil) Patrícia Segala	6–3, 3–6, 2–6

=== Doubles: 4 (1–3) ===
Result	No.	Date	Tournament	Surface	Partner	Opponents	Score
Win	1.	1 May 1994	Lerida, Spain	Clay	(Argentina) Valentina Solari	(Spain) Ana Alcázar (Spain) Rosa María Andrés Rodríguez	6–7^{(5)}, 7–6^{(4)}, 7–5
Loss	1.	8 May 1994	Balaguer, Spain	Clay	(Argentina) Valentina Solari	(Spain) Alicia Ortuño (Spain) Cristina Torrens Valero	1–6, 1–6
Loss	2.	14 May 1995	Balaguer, Spain	Clay	(Spain) Maria Sánchez Lorenzo	(Spain) Nuria Montero (Spain) Marta Cano	1–6, 2–6
Loss	3.	18 August 1996	Koksijde, Belgium	Clay	(Spain) Cristina de Subijana	(Australia) Natalie Dittmann (Australia) Mireille Dittmann	4–6, 1–6
