= Ana Salas Lozano =

Spanish tennis player (born 1972)

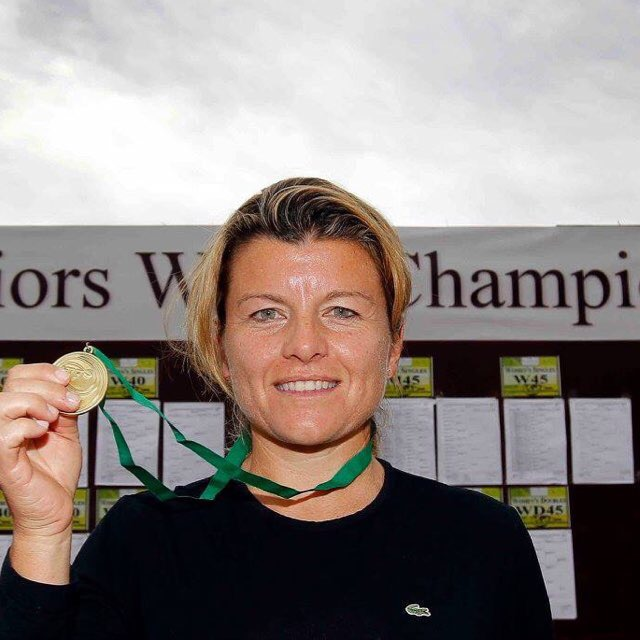
- Country (sports): Spain
- Born: 12 July 1972 (age 52); Madrid, Spain
- Plays: Right-handed
- Prize money: $77,416

Singles
- Career titles: 4 ITF
- Highest ranking: No. 275 (19 April 1999)

Doubles
- Career titles: 0
- Highest ranking: No. 326 (5 January 1998)

Ana Salas Lozano (born 12 July 1972) is a Spanish former professional tennis player.

A right-handed player from Madrid, Salas reached a best singles ranking on tour of 275, with four ITF titles.

In 1998 she received a wildcard into the main draw of her home WTA Tour tournament, the Madrid Open, where she was beaten in the first round by Meike Babel.

== ITF finals ==
Legend
$25,000 tournaments
$10,000 tournaments

=== Singles (4–4) ===
Result	No.	Date	Tournament	Surface	Opponent	Score
Win	1.	29 April 1996	Balaguer, Spain	Clay	(Spain) Patricia Aznar	6–2, 6–4
Loss	1.	26 October 1997	Ceuta, Spain	Hard	(Morocco) Bahia Mouhtassine	2–6, 6–2, 5–7
Loss	2.	4 May 1998	Elvas, Portugal	Hard	(Spain) Rosa María Andrés Rodríguez	1–6, 3–6
Loss	3.	7 March 1999	Albufeira, Portugal	Hard	(Spain) Laura Pena	3–6, 1–6
Win	2.	27 March 2000	Pontevedra, Spain	Hard	(Argentina) Vanesa Krauth	6–1, 6–4
Loss	4.	8 May 2000	Tortosa, Spain	Clay	(Argentina) Vanesa Krauth	6–2, 3–6, 1–6
Win	3.	14 September 2003	Madrid, Spain	Clay	(Russia) Alisa Kleybanova	6–4, 6–1
Win	4.	13 June 2005	Montemor-o-Novo, Portugal	Hard	(Germany) Laura Zelder	7–5, 4–6, 6–2

=== Doubles (0–4) ===
Result	No.	Date	Tournament	Surface	Partner	Opponents	Score
Loss	1.	10 May 1993	Barcelona, Spain	Clay	(Spain) María Fernanda Landa	(Spain) Conchita Martínez Granados (Germany) Claudia Timm	5–7, 6–1, 2–6
Loss	2.	6 May 1996	Santander, Spain	Clay	(Portugal) Joana Pedroso	(Spain) Marta Cano (Spain) Nuria Montero	4–6, 4–6
Loss	3.	13 May 1996	Tortosa, Spain	Clay	(Spain) Yolanda Clemot	(Portugal) Ana Gaspar (Republic of Ireland) Gina Niland	4–6, 2–6
Loss	4.	5 July 1999	Vigo, Spain	Clay	(Spain) Patricia Aznar	(Spain) Lourdes Domínguez Lino (Spain) Anabel Medina Garrigues	5–7, 1–6
