= Camucia =

Coordinates: 43°16′N 11°58′E

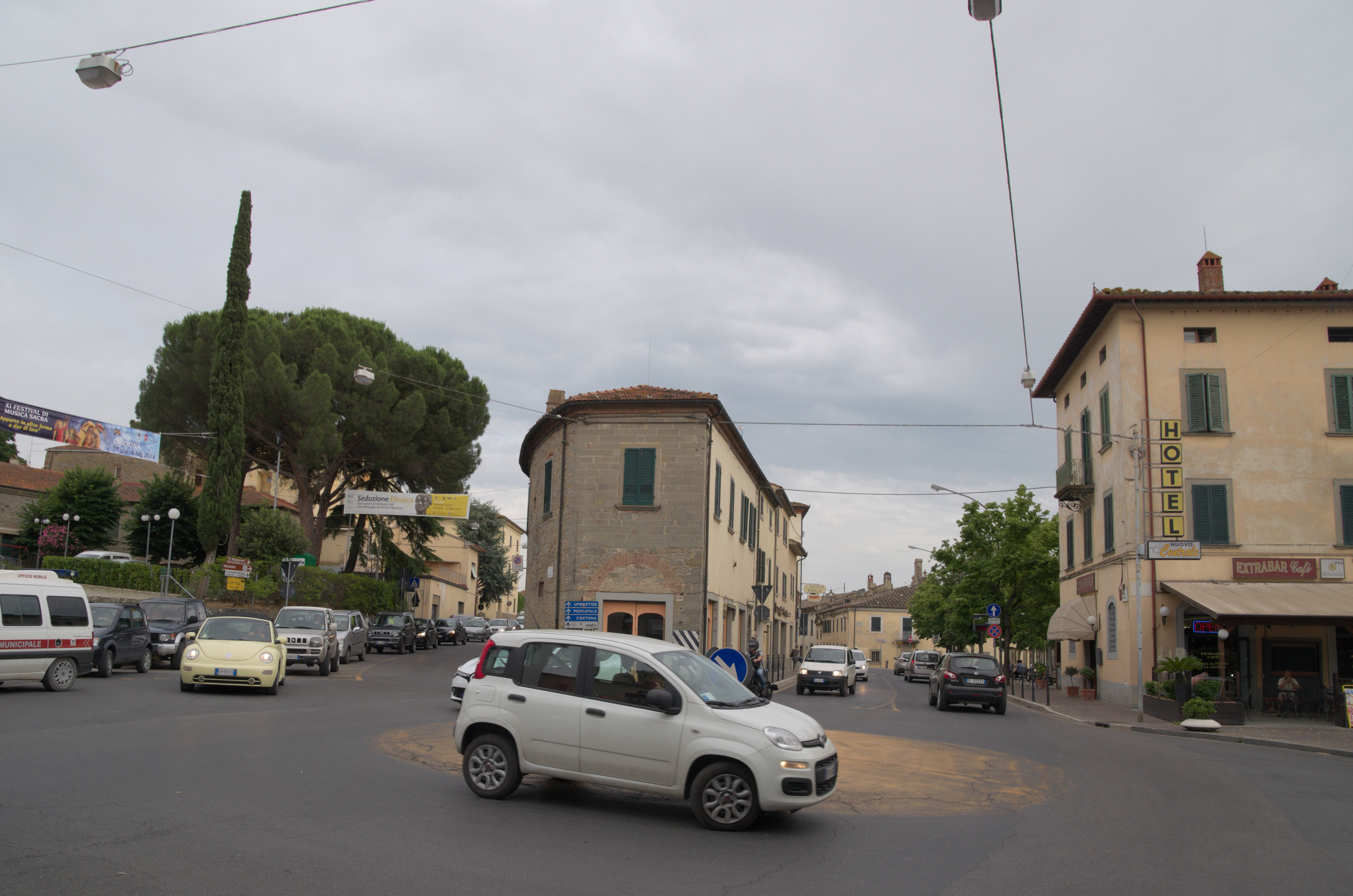
Camucia center beside the Chiesa di Cristo Re

Camucia (Italian pronunciation: [kamuˈtʃiːa]) is a small town in Tuscany in central Italy. It is a frazione of Cortona. Sitting at the base of the hill on which Cortona lies, it serves as the railway station for the historic town, on the main Florence - Rome line.
