= 1998 Páginas Amarillas Open =

- Date: 18–23 May
- Edition: 3rd
- Category: Tier III
- Surface: Clay / outdoor
- Location: Madrid, Spain

Champions

Singles
- (Switzerland) Patty Schnyder

Doubles
- (Argentina) Florencia Labat / (Belgium) Dominique Van Roost
- WTA Madrid Open

The 1998 Páginas Amarillas Open was a women's tennis tournament played on outdoor clay courts in Madrid in Spain that was part of Tier III of the 1998 WTA Tour. It was the third edition of the tournament and was held from 18 May through 23 May 1998. Third-seeded Patty Schnyder won the singles title.

== Finals ==
=== Singles ===
(Switzerland) Patty Schnyder defeated (Belgium) Dominique Van Roost 3–6, 6–4, 6–0

- It was Schnyder's 4th title of the year and the 4th of her career.

=== Doubles ===
(Argentina) Florencia Labat / (Belgium) Dominique Van Roost defeated (Australia) Rachel McQuillan / (Australia) Nicole Pratt 6–3, 6–1

- It was Labat's only title of the year and the 6th of her career. It was Van Roost's 2nd title of the year and the 7th of her career.
