= Cristina Torrens Valero =

Spanish tennis player (born 1974)

- Country (sports): Spain
- Residence: Valencia, Spain
- Born: 12 September 1974 (age 51) Pamplona, Spain
- Height: 1.71 m (5 ft 7 1/2 in)
- Turned pro: 1989
- Retired: 2004
- Plays: Right-handed (two-handed backhand)
- Prize money: $1,000,722

Singles
- Career record: 309–292
- Career titles: 2 WTA, 6 ITF
- Highest ranking: No. 27 (4 March 2002)

Grand Slam singles results
- Australian Open: 2R (1998, 2003)
- French Open: 3R (1999, 2001)
- Wimbledon: 3R (2000)
- US Open: 2R (1996, 2002)

Doubles
- Career record: 102–143
- Career titles: 2 WTA, 5 ITF
- Highest ranking: No. 66 (29 January 2001)

Grand Slam doubles results
- Australian Open: 1R (2000, 2001, 2002)
- French Open: 3R (1999)
- Wimbledon: 2R (1999)
- US Open: 2R (2000)

Team competitions
- Fed Cup: 3–3

Cristina Torrens Valero (born 12 September 1974) is a former professional female tennis player from Spain. She won two singles and two doubles titles on the WTA Tour. Cristina reached her career-high singles ranking of world No. 27 on 4 March 2002.

In 1993, Torrens Valero helped Spain recapture the Fed Cup title.

== WTA Tour finals ==
=== Singles: 5 (2 titles, 3 runner-ups) ===
Legend
Tier I (0–0)
Tier II (0–0)
Tier III (1–0)
Tier IV & V (1–3)

Result	W/L	Date	Tournament	Surface	Opponent	Score
Loss	0–1	Apr 1999	Budapest Grand Prix, Hungary	Clay	(France) Sarah Pitkowski	2–6, 2–6
Win	1–1	May 1999	Warsaw Open, Poland	Clay	(Argentina) Inés Gorrochategui	7–5, 7–6
Loss	1–2	May 2000	Belgium Open, Antwerp	Clay	(South Africa) Amanda Coetzer	6–4, 2–6, 3–6
Loss	1–3	Jul 2001	Palermo Ladies Open, Italy	Clay	(Spain) Anabel Medina Garrigues	4–6, 4–6
Win	2–3	Jul 2001	Warsaw Open, Poland	Clay	(Spain) Gala León García	6–2, 6–2

=== Doubles: 4 (2 titles, 2 runner-ups) ===
Legend
Tier I (0–1)
Tier II (0–0)
Tier III (0–1)
Tier IV & V (2–1)

Result	W/L	Date	Tournament	Surface	Partner	Opponents	Score
Win	1–1	Apr 1999	Estoril Open, Portugal	Clay	(Spain) Alicia Ortuño	(Hungary) Anna Foldenyi (Hungary) Rita Kuti-Kis	7–6, 3–6, 6–3
Loss	1–1	Apr 2000	Estoril Open, Portugal	Clay	(Netherlands) Amanda Hopmans	(Slovenia) Tina Križan (Slovenia) Katarina Srebotnik	0–6, 6–7^{(9)}
Win	2–1	Apr 2000	Budapest Grand Prix, Hungary	Clay	(Bulgaria) Lubomira Bacheva	(Croatia) Jelena Kostanić (Federal Republic of Yugoslavia) Sandra Načuk	6–0, 6–2
Loss	2–2	Oct 2000	Luxembourg Open	Carpet (i)	(Bulgaria) Lubomira Bacheva	(France) Alexandra Fusai (France) Nathalie Tauziat	3–6, 6–7^{(0–7)}

== ITF Circuit finals ==
$50,000 tournaments
$25,000 tournaments
$10,000 tournaments

=== Singles: 12 (6–6) ===
Result	No.	Date	Tournament	Surface	Opponent	Score
Loss	1.	25 February 1991	ITF Valencia, Spain	Clay	(Czechoslovakia) Eva Melicharová	5–7, 2–6
Win	1.	19 May 1991	ITF Balaguer, Spain	Clay	(Sweden) Marianne Vallin	7–5, 6–4
Win	2.	6 June 1993	ITF Cáceres, Spain	Hard	(Israel) Limor Zaltz	6–3, 7–6^{(5)}
Win	3.	7 February 1994	ITF Faro, Portugal	Hard	(Spain) Mariam Ramón Climent	6–3, 6–4
Loss	2.	5 June 1994	ITF Hebron, Spain	Hard	(Spain) Ángeles Montolio	3–6, 2–6
Win	4.	26 June 1994	ITF Valladolid, Spain	Clay	(Spain) Virginia Ruano Pascual	6–3, 6–3
Loss	3.	18 September 1995	ITF Bucharest, Romania	Clay	(Switzerland) Emanuela Zardo	3–6, 4–6
Loss	4.	5 May 1996	ITF Szczecin, Poland	Clay	(Czech Republic) Lenka Cenková	2–6, 4–6
Win	5.	13 May 1996	ITF Athens Open, Greece	Clay	(Spain) Gala León García	6–4, 6–4
Loss	5.	20 June 1999	Open de Marseille, France	Clay	(Spain) Ángeles Montolio	4–6, 5–7
Loss	6.	6 July 2003	ITF Orbetello, Italy	Clay	(Slovakia) Ľubomíra Kurhajcová	5–7, 1–6
Win	6.	1 September 2003	ITF Fano, Italy	Clay	(Colombia) Catalina Castaño	6–3, 5–7, 6–3

=== Doubles: 9 (5–4) ===
Result	No.	Date	Tournament	Surface	Partner	Opponents	Score
Win	1.	25 March 1991	ITF Bilbao, Spain	Clay	(Spain) Eva Jiménez	(Germany) Cora Linneman (Spain) Ana Larrakoetxea	7–5, 7–6^{(4)}
Loss	1.	13 May 1991	ITF Balaguer, Spain	Clay	(Spain) Eva Jiménez	(Germany) Cora Linneman (Spain) Ana Larrakoetxea	7–5, 3–6, 3–6
Win	2.	2 May 1994	ITF Balaguer, Spain	Clay	(Spain) Alicia Ortuño	(Spain) Rosa María Pérez (Argentina) Valentina Solari	6–1, 6–1
Win	3.	9 May 1994	ITF Mollet, Spain	Clay	(Spain) Alicia Ortuño	(Argentina) Mariana Randrup (Argentina) Cintia Tortorella	6–4, 6–0
Win	4.	30 May 1994	ITF Barcelona, Spain	Hard	(Spain) Alicia Ortuño	(Switzerland) Emmanuelle Gagliardi (Czech Republic) Petra Kučová	3–6, 6–2, 6–2
Loss	2.	18 July 1994	ITF Bilbao, Spain	Clay	(Spain) Yolanda Clemot	(Romania) Cătălina Cristea (Netherlands) Hanneke Ketelaars	2–6, 1–6
Loss	3.	1 August 1994	ITF Munich, Germany	Clay	(Spain) Silvia Ramón-Cortés	(Italy) Carin Bakkum (Czech Republic) Helena Vildová	6–7, 0–6
Win	5.	4 September 1995	ITF Cáceres, Spain	Clay	(Spain) Alicia Ortuño	(Spain) Patricia Aznar (Spain) Eva Bes	6–2, 6–3
Loss	4.	19 September 1999	ITF Bordeaux, France	Clay	(Bulgaria) Lubomira Bacheva	(Sweden) Åsa Carlsson (France) Émilie Loit	2–6, 6–7

== Grand Slam singles performance ==
Key
W	F	SF	QF	#R	RR	Q#	DNQ	A	NH

(W) winner; (F) finalist; (SF) semifinalist; (QF) quarterfinalist; (#R) rounds 4, 3, 2, 1; (RR) round-robin stage; (Q#) qualification round; (DNQ) did not qualify; (A) absent; (NH) not held; (SR) strike rate (events won / competed); (W–L) win–loss record.

Tournament	1996	1997	1998	1999	2000	2001	2002	2003	2004	SR
Australian Open	A	1R	2R	1R	1R	1R	1R	2R	1R	2–8
French Open	A	1R	1R	3R	1R	3R	2R	1R	Q1	5–7
Wimbledon	A	2R	1R	1R	3R	2R	1R	1R	Q1	4–7
US Open	2R	1R	1R	1R	1R	1R	2R	1R	Q1	2–8
Win–loss	1–1	1–4	1–4	2–4	2–4	3–4	2–4	1–4	0–1	13–30
