= Martina Nedelková =

Slovak tennis player

- Country (sports): Slovakia
- Born: 21 October 1977 (age 48) Piešťany, Slovakia
- Plays: Right-handed
- College: VCU Rams
- Prize money: US$ 13,488

Singles
- Highest ranking: No. 441 (7 October 1996)

Martina Nedelková (born 21 October 1977) is a former professional Slovak tennis player. On 7 October 1996, she reached her highest WTA singles ranking of 441.

== Personal life ==
Martina was born on 21 October 1977 in Piešťany. Nedelková started playing tennis in Piešťany with coach Ivo Doležálek. Martina currently lives in the USA, where she remained after successful studies and works as a tennis coach.

== Career ==
Nedelková had a successful junior career, Her career-high world ranking as a junior was world No. 1. In 1994 Nedelková won a prestigious tournaments for juniors Osaka Mayor's Cup and Trofeo Bonfiglio (Grade A) She has won six doubles titles on the ITF Women's Circuit.

She decided to follow the college route and was part of the VCU Rams tennis team from 1998 to 2001.

== ITF Junior Circuit finals ==
Legend
Category GA
Category G1
Category G2
Category G3
Category G4
Category G5

=== Singles (1–3) ===
Outcome	No.	Date	Location	Grade	Surface	Opponent	Score
Runner-up	1.	August 1993	Bratislava, Slovakia	G3	Clay	(Slovakia) Michaela Hasanová	2–6, 0–6
Runner-up	2.	August 1993	Villach, Austria	G5	Clay	(Slovakia) Lenka Zacharová	6–1, 3–6, 6–7
Winner	1.	January 1994	Barranquilla, Colombia	G1	Clay	(Colombia) Giana Gutiérrez	6–4, 1–6, 6–2
Runner-up	3.	August 1994	Bratislava, Slovakia	G3	Clay	(Slovakia) Henrieta Nagyová	1–6, 2–6

=== Doubles (7–2) ===
Outcome	No.	Date	Location	Grade	Surface	Partner	Opponents	Score
Winner	1.	August 1993	Villach, Austria	G5	Clay	(Slovakia) Lenka Zacharová	(Germany) Stephanie Kovacic (Austria) Barbara Schwartz	6–1, 6–4
Winner	2.	January 1994	Abierto Juvenil Mexicano, Mexico	G2	Clay	(Slovakia) Michaela Hasanová	(Georgia (country)) Nino Louarsabishvili (Georgia (country)) Anastasia Pozdniakova	7–6, 6–3
Winner	3.	January 1994	Copa del Cafe, Costa Rica	G2	Clay	(Slovakia) Michaela Hasanová	(Mexico) Monica Bonilla (Slovakia) Henrieta Nagyová	6–2, 7–5
Winner	4.	January 1994	Caracas, Venezuela	GA	Clay	(Slovakia) Michaela Hasanová	(Brazil) Miriam D'Agostini (Brazil) Marcia Komlos	6–2, 4–6, 6–1
Winner	5.	January 1994	Barranquilla, Colombia	G1	Clay	(Slovakia) Michaela Hasanová	(Colombia) Mariana Mesa (Austria) Barbara Schwartz	7–5, 6–2
Runner-up	1.	February 1994	Přerov, Czech Republic	G2	Clay	(Slovakia) Tatiana Zelenayová	(Czech Republic) Lenka Cenková (Czech Republic) Libuše Průšová	6–7, 5–7
Runner-up	2.	May 1994	Florence, Italy	G1	Clay	(Slovakia) Michaela Hasanová	(Slovakia) Henrieta Nagyová (Slovakia) Tatiana Zelenayová	6–4, 4–6, 0–6
Winner	6.	May 1994	Trofeo Bonfiglio, Italy	GA	Clay	(Slovakia) Michaela Hasanová	(Colombia) Carmiña Giraldo (Colombia) Mariana Mesa	1–6, 6–3, 6–4
Winner	7.	October 1994	Osaka Mayor's Cup, Japan	GA	Hard	(Slovakia) Tatiana Zelenayová	(Japan) Nami Urabe (Japan) Futaba Kubota	6–4, 3–6, 6–1
