= 1999 Copa Colsanitas – Singles =

Singles
- 1999 Copa Colsanitas

Final
- Champion: (Colombia) Fabiola Zuluaga
- Runner-up: (Greece) Christína Papadáki
- Score: 6–1, 6–3

Events
| Singles | Doubles |
| ← 1998 · | Copa Colsanitas | · 2000 → |

The 1999 Copa Colsanitas singles was the singles event of the second edition of the Copa Colsanitas; a WTA Tier IV tournament and the most prestigious women's tennis tournament held in Colombia and Hispanic America. Paola Suárez was the defending champion but lost in the semifinals to Christína Papadáki.

Fabiola Zuluaga won in the final 6–1, 6–3 against Papadáki.

== Seeds ==
1. (China) Li Fang (quarterfinals)
2. (Argentina) Florencia Labat (first round)
3. (United States) Meghann Shaughnessy (semifinals)
4. (Argentina) Paola Suárez (semifinals)
5. (Colombia) Fabiola Zuluaga (champion)
6. (Netherlands) Seda Noorlander (second round)
7. (Argentina) Mariana Díaz Oliva (second round)
8. (Germany) Jana Kandarr (first round)

== Draw ==
=== Key ===
- Q = Qualifier
- WC = Wild card
- LL = Lucky loser
- Alt = Alternate
- SE = Special exempt
- PR = Protected ranking
- ITF = ITF entry
- JE = Junior exempt
- w/o = Walkover
- r = Retired
- d = Defaulted
- SR = Special ranking

=== Finals ===
Semifinals
5 | (Colombia) Fabiola Zuluaga | 2 | 6 | 6
3 | (United States) Meghann Shaughnessy | 6 | 3 | 4
4 | (Argentina) Paola Suárez | 3 | 5
(Greece) Christína Papadáki | 6 | 7

Final
5 | (Colombia) Fabiola Zuluaga | 6 | 6
(Greece) Christína Papadáki | 1 | 3

=== Top half ===
First round
1 | (China) Li F | 6 | 6
Q | (Argentina) L Masante | 1 | 4
(Spain) M Ramón Climent | 6 | 4 | 3
(Spain) E Bes | 2 | 6 | 6
(Spain) G Riela Roura | 6 | 6
Q | (Argentina) R Ottoboni | 2 | 1
(Spain) C Torrens Valero | 2 | 3
5 | (Colombia) F Zuluaga | 6 | 6
3 | (United States) M Shaughnessy | 6 | 6
(United States) S Reeves | 4 | 2
(France) K Jagieniak | 7^{7} | 6
WC | (Colombia) M Mesa | 6^{1} | 2
WC | (Colombia) C Castaño | 3 | 1
(Paraguay) L Schaerer | 6 | 6
(Argentina) I Gorrochategui | 7 | 6
8 | (Germany) J Kandarr | 5 | 4

Second round
1 | (China) Li F | 3 | 6 | 6
(Spain) E Bes | 6 | 2 | 1
(Spain) G Riera Roura | 1 | 2
5 | (Colombia) F Zuluaga | 6 | 6
3 | (United States) M Shaughnessy | 7^{8} | 6
(France) K Jagieniak | 6^{6} | 4
(Paraguay) L Schaerer | 6 | 7^{7}
(Argentina) I Gorrochategui | 1 | 6^{5}

Quarterfinals
1 | (China) Li F | 6 | 0 | 4
5 | (Colombia) F Zuluaga | 2 | 6 | 6
3 | (United States) M Shaughnessy | 6 | 7^{7}
(Paraguay) L Schaerer | 4 | 6^{4}

Semifinals
5 | (Colombia) F Zuluaga | 2 | 6 | 6
3 | (United States) M Shaughnessy | 6 | 3 | 4

=== Bottom half ===
First round
6 | (Netherlands) S Noorlander | 3
(France) N van Lottum | 2 | r
(Brazil) V Menga | 6 | 6
(Spain) C Martínez Granados | 4 | 0
LL | (Italy) A Canepa | 2 | 4
Q | (Argentina) C Contín | 6 | 6
(Spain) A Ortuño | 6 | 3 | 1
4 | (Argentina) P Suárez | 4 | 6 | 6
7 | (Argentina) M Díaz Oliva | 6 | 6
Q | (Spain) C Arribas | 4 | 3
(Hungary) R Kuti-Kis | 3 | 6 | 2
(Italy) T Garbin | 6 | 4 | 6
(Slovakia) Ľ Cervanová | 6 | 2 | 7^{7}
(Austria) M Maruska | 2 | 6 | 6^{3}
(Greece) C Papadáki | 6 | 6
2 | (Argentina) F Labat | 2 | 2

Second round
6 | (Netherlands) S Noorlander | 6 | 3 | 4
(Brazil) V Menga | 0 | 6 | 6
Q | (Argentina) C Contín | 3 | 6^{3}
4 | (Argentina) P Suárez | 6 | 7^{7}
7 | (Argentina) M Díaz Oliva | 3 | 3
(Italy) T Garbin | 6 | 6
(Slovakia) Ľ Cervanová | 3 | 4
(Greece) C Papadáki | 6 | 6

Quarterfinals
(Brazil) V Menga | 5 | 6 | 3
4 | (Argentina) P Suárez | 7 | 3 | 6
(Italy) T Garbin | 1 | 3
(Greece) C Papadáki | 6 | 6

Semifinals
4 | (Argentina) P Suárez | 3 | 5
(Greece) C Papadáki | 6 | 7

== Qualifying ==
=== Seeds ===
1. (Italy) Alice Canepa (qualifying competition, lucky loser)
2. (Australia) Jelena Dokić (qualifying competition)
3. (United States) Tracy Singian (first round)
4. (Austria) Sybille Bammer (first round)
5. (Canada) Martina Nejedly (second round)
6. (Sweden) Kristina Triska (second round)
7. (Argentina) Luciana Masante (qualifier)
8. (Argentina) Celeste Contín (qualifier)

=== Qualifiers ===
1. (Argentina) Luciana Masante
2. (Spain) Cristina Arribas
3. (Argentina) Celeste Contín
4. (Argentina) Romina Ottoboni

=== Lucky losers ===
1. (Italy) Alice Canepa

== Qualifying draw ==
=== Key ===
- Q = Qualifier
- WC = Wild card
- LL = Lucky loser
- Alt = Alternate
- SE = Special exempt
- PR = Protected ranking
- ITF = ITF entry
- JE = Junior exempt
- w/o = Walkover
- r = Retired
- d = Defaulted
- SR = Special ranking

=== First qualifier ===
First round
1 | (Italy) Alice Canepa
Bye
(Peru) María Eugenia Rojas | 6 | 6
WC | (Colombia) Marcela Monroy | 1 | 1
(Germany) Jennifer Tinnacher | 7^{7} | 6
(United States) Sylvia Schenck | 6^{5} | 2
WC | (Colombia) Diana Olave | 3 | 5
7 | (Argentina) Luciana Masante | 6 | 7

Second round
1 | (Italy) Alice Canepa | 5 | 6 | 7
(Peru) María Eugenia Rojas | 7 | 2 | 5
(Germany) Jennifer Tinnacher | 1 | 0
7 | (Argentina) Luciana Masante | 6 | 6

Qualifying competition
1 | (Italy) Alice Canepa | 2 | 6 | 2
7 | (Argentina) Luciana Masante | 6 | 0 | 6

=== Second qualifier ===
First round
3 | (United States) Tracy Singian | 3 | 2
(Croatia) Dora Krstulović | 6 | 6
WC | (Colombia) Catalina Isaza | 3 | 2
(Spain) Cristina Arribas | 6 | 6
(Colombia) Giana Gutiérrez | 6 | 6
WC | (Colombia) Catalina Acosta | 0 | 0
(Argentina) Laura Montalvo | 6 | 6
6 | (Sweden) Kristina Triska | 4 | 1

Second round
(Croatia) Dora Krstulović | 5 | 4
(Spain) Cristina Arribas | 7 | 6
(Colombia) Giana Gutiérrez | 6 | 6
(Argentina) Laura Montalvo | 3 | 4

Qualifying competition
(Spain) Cristina Arribas | 7^{7} | 6
(Colombia) Giana Gutiérrez | 6^{2} | 4

=== Third qualifier ===
First round
8 | (Argentina) Celeste Contín | 6 | 6
WC | (Colombia) María Claudia Romo | 1 | 1
(Hungary) Adrienn Hegedűs | 6 | 3 | 6
(Colombia) María Adelaida Agudelo | 1 | 6 | 1
(Colombia) Viviana Rojas Millán | 5 | 7 | 6
(Colombia) Ana Carolina Martínez | 7 | 5 | 2
(Argentina) Melisa Arévalo | 0 | 6 | 6
4 | (Austria) Sybille Bammer | 6 | 4 | 3

Second round
8 | (Argentina) Celeste Contín | 6 | 5 | 6
(Hungary) Adrienn Hegedűs | 2 | 7 | 2
(Colombia) Viviana Rojas Millán | 2 | 2
(Argentina) Melisa Arévalo | 6 | 6

Qualifying competition
8 | (Argentina) Celeste Contín | 6 | 6^{2} | 6
(Argentina) Melisa Arévalo | 3 | 7^{7} | 3

=== Fourth qualifier ===
First round
5 | (Canada) Martina Nejedly | 4 | 4
(Argentina) Romina Ottoboni | 6 | 6
(Ecuador) Candice de la Torre | 3 | 6 | 2
(Colombia) Jenny Andrade | 6 | 2 | 6
(Colombia) Ana María Simanca | 4 | 2
(Germany) Vanessa Henke | 6 | 6
(Colombia) Martha Garzón Elkins | 2 | 0
2 | (Australia) Jelena Dokić | 6 | 6

Second round
(Argentina) Romina Ottoboni | 6 | 6
(Colombia) Jenny Andrade | 1 | 0
(Germany) Vanessa Henke | 2 | 2
2 | (Australia) Jelena Dokić | 6 | 6

Qualifying competition
(Argentina) Romina Ottoboni | 4 | 7 | 6
2 | (Australia) Jelena Dokić | 6 | 5 | 4
