= 1999 Copa Colsanitas – Doubles =

Doubles
- 1999 Copa Colsanitas

Final
- Champions: (Netherlands) Seda Noorlander (Greece) Christína Papadáki
- Runners-up: (Argentina) Laura Montalvo (Argentina) Paola Suárez
- Score: 6–4, 7–6^{(7–5)}

Events
Singles	Doubles
← 1998 ·	Copa Colsanitas	· 2000 →

The 1999 Copa Colsanitas doubles was the doubles event of the second edition of the Copa Colsanitas; a WTA Tier IV tournament and the most prestigious women's tennis tournament held in Colombia and Hispanic America. Janette Husárová and Paola Suárez were the defending champions but only Suárez competed that year with Laura Montalvo.

Montalvo and Suárez lost in the final 6–4, 7–6 against Seda Noorlander and Christína Papadáki.

== Seeds ==
1. (Argentina) Laura Montalvo / (Argentina) Paola Suárez (final)
2. (Netherlands) Seda Noorlander / (Greece) Christína Papadáki (champions)
3. (Spain) Eva Bes / (United States) Samantha Reeves (semifinals)
4. (Italy) Alice Canepa / (Italy) Tathiana Garbin (semifinals)

== Draw ==
=== Key ===
- Q = Qualifier
- WC = Wild card
- LL = Lucky loser
- Alt = Alternate
- SE = Special exempt
- PR = Protected ranking
- ITF = ITF entry
- JE = Junior exempt
- w/o = Walkover
- r = Retired
- d = Defaulted
- SR = Special ranking

First round
1	(Argentina) L Montalvo (Argentina) P Suárez	6	1	7
(Colombia) M Mesa (Colombia) F Zuluaga	3	6	5
Q	(Australia) J Dokić (Argentina) I Gorrochategui	6	6
(Spain) M Ramón Climent (Spain) C Torrens Valero	3	0
4	(Italy) A Canepa (Italy) T Garbin	6	6
WC	(Colombia) M-A Agudelo (Colombia) J Andrade	2	0
(Hungary) A Hegedűs (United States) T Singian	6	7^{7}
(Slovakia) Ľ Cervanová (Spain) C Martínez Granados	4	6^{0}
(Germany) J Kandarr (Argentina) F Labat	7	6
(Argentina) M Díaz Oliva (Argentina) R Ottoboni	5	3
(Argentina) M Arévalo (Argentina) C Contín	3	0
3	(Spain) E Bes (United States) S Reeves	6	6
(Argentina) L Masante (Spain) A Ortuño	1	2
(Brazil) V Menga (Paraguay) L Schaerer	6	6
(Hungary) R Kuti-Kis (Spain) G Riera Roura	3	3
2	(Netherlands) S Noorlander (Greece) C Papadáki	6	6

Quarterfinals
1	(Argentina) L Montalvo (Argentina) P Suárez	4	6	6
Q	(Australia) J Dokić (Argentina) I Gorrochategui	6	3	4
4	(Italy) A Canepa (Italy) T Garbin	7^{7}	6
(Hungary) A Hegedűs (United States) T Singian	6^{4}	2
(Germany) J Kandarr (Argentina) F Labat	3	3
3	(Spain) E Bes (United States) S Reeves	6	6
(Brazil) V Menga (Paraguay) L Schaerer	6	3	3
2	(Netherlands) S Noorlander (Greece) C Papadáki	2	6	6

Semifinals
1	(Argentina) L Montalvo (Argentina) P Suárez	6	6
4	(Italy) A Canepa (Italy) T Garbin	3	1
3	(Spain) E Bes (United States) S Reeves	6	3	2
2	(Netherlands) S Noorlander (Greece) C Papadáki	3	6	6

Final
1	(Argentina) L Montalvo (Argentina) P Suárez	4	6^{5}
2	(Netherlands) S Noorlander (Greece) C Papadáki	6	7^{7}

== Qualifying ==
=== Seeds ===
1. (Colombia) Martha Garzón Elkins / (Peru) María Eugenia Rojas (first round)
2. (Germany) Vanessa Henke / (Germany) Jennifer Tinnacher (second round)

=== Qualifiers ===
1. (Australia) Jelena Dokić / (Argentina) Inés Gorrochategui

== Qualifying draw ==
=== Key ===
- Q = Qualifier
- WC = Wild card
- LL = Lucky loser
- Alt = Alternate
- SE = Special exempt
- PR = Protected ranking
- ITF = ITF entry
- JE = Junior exempt
- w/o = Walkover
- r = Retired
- d = Defaulted
- SR = Special ranking

First round
1	(Colombia) Martha Garzón Elkins (Peru) María Eugenia Rojas	1
(Austria) Marion Maruska (United States) Meghann Shaughnessy	8
(Colombia) Catalina Acosta (Colombia) Marcela Monroy	0
(China) Li Fang (United States) Sylvia Schenck	8
(Spain) Cristina Arribas (Colombia) Ana María Simanca	4
(Australia) Jelena Dokić (Argentina) Inés Gorrochategui	8
WC	(Colombia) Diana Olave (Colombia) Viviana Rojas Millán	0
2	(Germany) Vanessa Henke (Germany) Jennifer Tinnacher	8

Second round
(Austria) Marion Maruska (United States) Meghann Shaughnessy	6
(China) Li Fang (United States) Sylvia Schenck	8
(Australia) Jelena Dokić (Argentina) Inés Gorrochategui	8
2	(Germany) Vanessa Henke (Germany) Jennifer Tinnacher	3

Qualifying competition
(China) Li Fang (United States) Sylvia Schenck	3
(Australia) Jelena Dokić (Argentina) Inés Gorrochategui	8
