= 1998 Copa Colsanitas – Doubles =

Doubles
- 1998 Copa Colsanitas

Final
- Champions: (Slovakia) Janette Husárová (Argentina) Paola Suárez
- Runners-up: (United States) Melissa Mazzotta (Russia) Ekaterina Sysoeva
- Score: 3–6, 6–2, 6–3

Details
- Draw: 16
- Seeds: 4

Events
Singles	Doubles
Copa Colsanitas	· 1999 →

Janette Husárová and Paola Suárez won in the final 3–6, 6–2, 6–3 against Melissa Mazzotta and Ekaterina Sysoeva.

== Seeds ==
Champion seeds are indicated in bold text while text in italics indicates the round in which those seeds were eliminated.

1. (Belgium) Laurence Courtois / (United States) Corina Morariu (quarterfinals)
2. (Netherlands) Seda Noorlander / (France) Noëlle van Lottum (semifinals)
3. (Bulgaria) Svetlana Krivencheva / (Bulgaria) Pavlina Stoyanova (first round)
4. (Slovakia) **Janette Husárová** / (Argentina) **Paola Suárez (champions)**

== Draw ==
=== Key ===
- Q = Qualifier
- WC = Wild card
- LL = Lucky loser
- Alt = Alternate
- SE = Special exempt
- PR = Protected ranking
- ITF = ITF entry
- JE = Junior exempt
- w/o = Walkover
- r = Retired
- d = Defaulted
- SR = Special ranking

First round
1	(Belgium) **L Courtois** (United States) **C Morariu**	**6**	**6**
(South Africa) L Horn (Czech Republic) L Němečková	3	3
(Spain) M Escobar-Martinez (Sweden) K Triska	4	2
WC	(Colombia) **M Mesa** (Colombia) **F Zuluaga**	**6**	**6**
3	(Bulgaria) S Krivencheva (Bulgaria) P Stoyanova	**6**	2	2
(Argentina) **L Montalvo** (Argentina) **R Ottoboni**	3	**6**	**6**
(United States) R Jensen (Czech Republic) L Richterová	4	**6**	2
(United States) **M Mazzotta** (Russia) **E Sysoeva**	**6**	1	**6**
Q	(Austria) S Dopfer (Germany) V Martinek	2	r
(Argentina) **M Díaz Oliva** (Austria) **S Plischke**	**5**
(Hungary) K Marosi (Argentina) V Stele	4	4
4	(Slovakia) **J Husárová** (Argentina) **P Suárez**	**6**	**6**
(Canada) **R Kolbovic** (Paraguay) **L Schaerer**	**6**	**6**
(France) L Ghirardi (Canada) S Jeyaseelan	0	4
(Argentina) M D'Agostini (Brazil) V Menga	0	4
2	(Netherlands) **S Noorlander** (France) **N van Lottum**	**6**	**6**

Quarterfinals
1	(Belgium) L Courtois (United States) C Morariu	4	6	r
WC	(Colombia) **M Mesa** (Colombia) **F Zuluaga**	**6**	**6**
(Argentina) L Montalvo (Argentina) R Ottoboni	3	**6**	5
(United States) **M Mazzotta** (Russia) **E Sysoeva**	**6**	3	**7**
(Argentina) M Díaz Oliva (Austria) S Plischke	2	1
4	(Slovakia) **J Husárová** (Argentina) **P Suárez**	**6**	**6**
(Canada) R Kolbovic (Paraguay) L Schaerer	4	6
2	(Netherlands) **S Noorlander** (France) **N van Lottum**	**6**	**7**

Semifinals
WC	(Colombia) M Mesa (Colombia) F Zuluaga	4	2
(United States) **M Mazzotta** (Russia) **E Sysoeva**	**6**	**6**
4	(Slovakia) **J Husárová** (Argentina) **P Suárez**	6	**6**	**6**
2	(Netherlands) S Noorlander (France) N van Lottum	**7**	1	0

Final
(United States) Melissa Mazzotta (Russia) Ekaterina Sysoeva	**6**	2	3
4	(Slovakia) **Janette Husárová** (Argentina) **Paola Suárez**	3	**6**	**6**
