= 1998 Copa Colsanitas – Singles =

Singles
- 1998 Copa Colsanitas

Final
- Champion: (Argentina) Paola Suárez
- Runner-up: (Canada) Sonya Jeyaseelan
- Score: 6–3, 6–4

Details
- Draw: 32
- Seeds: 8

Events
Singles	Doubles
Copa Colsanitas	· 1999 →

Paola Suárez won in the final 6–3, 6–4 against Sonya Jeyaseelan.

== Seeds ==
A champion seed is indicated in bold text while text in italics indicates the round in which that seed was eliminated.

1. (United States) Corina Morariu (quarterfinals)
2. (Spain) Cristina Torrens Valero (second round)
3. (France) Alexia Dechaume-Balleret (first round)
4. (Austria) Sylvia Plischke (second round)
5. (Czech Republic) Lenka Němečková (second round)
6. (Canada) Sonya Jeyaseelan (final)
7. (France) Lea Ghirardi (first round)
8. (Argentina) Mariana Díaz Oliva (second round)

== Draw ==
=== Key ===
- Q = Qualifier
- WC = Wild card
- LL = Lucky loser
- Alt = Alternate
- SE = Special exempt
- PR = Protected ranking
- ITF = ITF entry
- JE = Junior exempt
- w/o = Walkover
- r = Retired
- d = Defaulted
- SR = Special ranking

First round
1	(United States) **C Morariu**	**6**	**6**
(United States) J Watanabe	3	1
Q	(Germany) A Barna	3	**6**	4
(France) **N van Lottum**	**6**	4	**6**
WC	(Colombia) **M Mesa**	**6**	**6**
(Germany) V Martinek	3	1
(Bulgaria) P Stoyanova	4	1
6	(Canada) **S Jeyaseelan**	**6**	**6**
4	(Austria) **S Plischke**	**6**	**6**
(Israel) A Smashnova	2	1
(Paraguay) **L Schaerer**	1	**6**	**6**
(Netherlands) S Noorlander	**6**	3	3
(Bulgaria) S Krivencheva	2	2
(Slovakia) **J Husárová**	**6**	**6**
Q	(Russia) E Sysoeva	1	**7**	4
8	(Argentina) **M Díaz Oliva**	**6**	6	**6**
5	(Czech Republic) **L Němečková**	**6**	**6**
(Spain) A Alcázar	1	2
(Austria) S Dopfer	2	3
(Colombia) **F Zuluaga**	**6**	**6**
(Argentina) **P Suárez**	**6**	**6**
Q	(Israel) T Obziler	2	2
(Czech Republic) **L Richterová**	**6**	1	**6**
3	(France) A Dechaume-Balleret	4	**6**	1
7	(France) L Ghirardi	0	2
(Belgium) **L Courtois**	**6**	**6**
WC	(Colombia) J Garcia	0	1
Q	(United States) **M Mazzotta**	**6**	**6**
(Spain) **C M Granados**	**6**	1	**6**
(Sweden) K Triska	4	**6**	3
(South Africa) L Horn	2	1
2	(Spain) **C Torrens Valero**	**6**	**6**

Second round
1	(United States) **C Morariu**	**6**	6	**6**
(France) N van Lottum	1	**7**	3
WC	(Colombia) M Mesa	3	2
6	(Canada) **S Jeyaseelan**	**6**	**6**
4	(Austria) S Plischke	1	5
(Paraguay) **L Schaerer**	**6**	**7**
(Slovakia) **J Husárová**	4	**7**	**6**
8	(Argentina) M Díaz Oliva	**6**	5	4
5	(Czech Republic) L Němečková	3	3
(Colombia) **F Zuluaga**	**6**	**6**
(Argentina) **P Suárez**	**6**	**6**
(Czech Republic) L Richterová	2	1
(Belgium) **L Courtois**	**6**	**6**
Q	(United States) M Mazzotta	0	2
(Spain) **C M Granados**	6	**7**	**6**
2	(Spain) C Torrens Valero	**7**	5	4

Quarterfinals
1	(United States) C Morariu	2	r
6	(Canada) **S Jeyaseelan**	**4**
(Paraguay) **L Schaerer**	6	**6**	**7**
(Slovakia) J Husárová	**7**	3	6
(Colombia) F Zuluaga	**7**	1	1
(Argentina) **P Suárez**	5	**6**	**6**
(Belgium) L Courtois	**6**	2	2
(Spain) **C M Granados**	4	**6**	**6**

Semifinals
6	(Canada) **S Jeyaseelan**	**7**	**6**
(Paraguay) L Schaerer	5	2
(Argentina) **P Suárez**	**6**	**6**
(Spain) C Martínez Granados	1	2

Final
6	(Canada) Sonya Jeyaseelan	3	4
(Argentina) **Paola Suárez**	**6**	**6**
