= 1999 Copa Colsanitas =

- Date: February 15–21
- Edition: 2nd
- Category: Tier IVa
- Draw: 32S / 16D
- Prize money: $140,000
- Surface: Clay / outdoor
- Location: Bogotá, Colombia
- Venue: Club Campestre El Rancho

Champions

Singles
- (Colombia) Fabiola Zuluaga

Doubles
- (Netherlands) Seda Noorlander / (Greece) Christína Papadáki
← 1998 ·	Copa Colsanitas	· 2000 →

The 1999 Copa Colsanitas was a women's tennis tournament played on outdoor clay courts at the Club Campestre El Rancho in Bogotá in Colombia that was part of Tier IVa of the 1999 WTA Tour. It was the second edition of the tournament and was held from February 15 through February 21, 1999. Fifth-seeded Fabiola Zuluaga won the singles title and earned $11,5000 first-prize money.

== Finals ==
=== Singles ===
(Colombia) Fabiola Zuluaga defeated (Greece) Christína Papadáki, 6–1, 6–3

- It was Zuluaga's 1st title of the year and the 1st of her career.

=== Doubles ===
(Netherlands) Seda Noorlander / (Greece) Christína Papadáki defeated (Argentina) Laura Montalvo / (Argentina) Paola Suárez, 6–4, 7–6^{(7–5)}

== Entrants ==
=== Seeds ===
Country	Player	Rank	Seed
CHN	Li Fang	45	1
ARG	Florencia Labat	75	2
USA	Meghann Shaughnessy	77	3
ARG	Paola Suárez	88	4
COL	Fabiola Zuluaga	90	5
NED	Seda Noorlander	94	6
ARG	Mariana Díaz Oliva	99	7
GER	Jana Kandarr	111	8

=== Other entrants ===
The following players received wildcards into the singles main draw:

- (Colombia) Mariana Mesa
- (Colombia) Catalina Castaño

The following players received wildcards into the doubles main draw:

- (Colombia) María Adelaida Agudelo / (Colombia) Jenny Andrade

The following players received entry from the singles qualifying draw:

- (Argentina) Luciana Masante
- (Argentina) Romina Ottoboni
- (Argentina) Celeste Contín
- (Spain) Cristina Arribas

The following player received entry as a lucky loser:

- (Italy) Alice Canepa

The following players received entry from the doubles qualifying draw:

- (Australia) Jelena Dokić / (Argentina) Inés Gorrochategui
