= Rosa María Andrés Rodríguez =

Spanish tennis player (born 1977)

- Country (sports): Spain
- Born: 29 May 1977 (age 49) Cala Millor, Spain
- Turned pro: 1993
- Retired: 2005
- Plays: Right (two-handed backhand)
- Prize money: US$ 171,639

Singles
- Career record: 271–183
- Career titles: 8 ITF
- Highest ranking: No. 152 (4 October 1999)

Grand Slam singles results
- Australian Open: Q2 (2001)
- French Open: Q2 (2000)
- Wimbledon: Q1 (1999)
- US Open: Q2 (2000)

Doubles
- Career record: 221–117
- Career titles: 1 WTA, 28 ITF
- Highest ranking: No. 81 (25 September 2000)

Grand Slam doubles results
- Australian Open: 1R (2000, 2001)
- French Open: 1R (1999, 2000)
- US Open: 1R (2000, 2005)

Rosa María Andrés Rodríguez (born 29 May 1977) is a former professional Spanish tennis player. Her highest singles and doubles rankings are 152 and No. 81, respectively.

== Career overview ==
In her career, Andrés won eight singles and 28 doubles titles on the ITF Women's Circuit and one doubles title on the WTA Tour.

In 2005, Andrés partnered Andreea Vanc to win her first and only Tour title, winning the doubles event in Strasbourg, France.

Andrés played at Grand Slam tournaments on multiple occasions, but failed to qualify in singles and could not make it past round one in doubles. She also did not manage to win an ITF title bigger than $25k events.

She retired from tennis, after losing in round one of the women's doubles event of the 2005 US Open.

== WTA Tour finals ==
=== Doubles: 2 (1 title, 1 runner-up) ===
Legend
Tier I (0–0)
Tier II (0–0)
Tier III (1–1)
Tier IV & V (0–0)

| Result | W–L | Date | Tournament | Surface | Partner | Opponents | Score |
|---|---|---|---|---|---|---|---|
| Loss | 0–1 | Feb 2005 | Acapulco, Mexico | Clay | (Spain) Conchita Martínez Granados | (Russia) Alina Jidkova (Ukraine) Tatiana Perebiynis | 5–7, 3–6 |
| Win | 1–1 | May 2005 | Strasbourg, France | Clay | (Romania) Andreea Ehritt-Vanc | (Poland) Marta Domachowska (Germany) Marlene Weingärtner | 6–3, 6–1 |

== ITF finals ==
Legend
$75,000 tournaments
$50,000 tournaments
$25,000 tournaments
$10,000 tournaments

=== Singles (8–10) ===
| Result | No. | Date | Tournament | Surface | Opponent | Score |
|---|---|---|---|---|---|---|
| Loss | 1. | 25 April 1994 | Lleida, Spain | Clay | (France) Peggy Rouquier | 6–3, 4–6, 5–7 |
| Loss | 2. | 3 April 1995 | Athens, Greece | Clay | (Greece) Christina Zachariadou | 0–6, 6–3, 2–6 |
| Loss | 3. | 5 February 1996 | Mallorca, Spain | Clay | (Austria) Ulrike Priller | 6–3, 4–6, 3–6 |
| Loss | 4. | 25 November 1996 | Mallorca, Spain | Clay | (Czech Republic) Zuzana Lešenarová | 4–6, 0–6 |
| Win | 1. | 4 August 1997 | Perigueux, France | Clay | (France) Nathalie Callen | 3–6, 6–2, 7–5 |
| Loss | 5. | 11 August 1997 | Saint-Gaudens, France | Clay | (Spain) Paula García | 6–2, 4–6, 5–7 |
| Loss | 6. | 9 February 1998 | Mallorca, Spain | Clay | (Spain) Gisela Riera | 4–6, 3–6 |
| Loss | 7. | 26 April 1998 | Bari, Italy | Clay | (Argentina) Romina Ottoboni | 6–2, 2–6, 5–7 |
| Win | 2. | 4 May 1998 | Elvas, Portugal | Hard | (Spain) Ana Salas Lozano | 6–1, 6–3 |
| Loss | 8. | 31 May 1998 | Warsaw, Poland | Clay | (Czech Republic) Michaela Paštiková | 5–7, 3–6 |
| Win | 3. | 13 December 1998 | Mallorca, Spain | Clay | (Italy) Giulia Casoni | 5–7, 6–4, 6–3 |
| Win | 4. | 7 June 1999 | Galatina, Italy | Clay | (Czech Republic) Michaela Paštiková | 6–1, 6–1 |
| Win | 5. | 20 November 2000 | Mallorca, Spain | Clay | (Russia) Dinara Safina | 5–3, 4–2, 0–4, 2–4, 5–3 |
| Win | 6. | 3 December 2000 | Mallorca, Spain | Clay | (Czech Republic) Dominika Luzarová | 4–1, 4–0, 4–0 |
| Win | 7. | 4 February 2002 | Mallorca, Spain | Clay | (Spain) Paula García | 6–3, 3–6, 7–6^{(5)} |
| Win | 8. | 1 December 2002 | Mallorca, Spain | Clay | (Serbia and Montenegro) Ana Timotić | 7–5, 7–5 |
| Loss | 9. | 21 April 2002 | Taranto, Italy | Clay | (Hungary) Virág Németh | 3–6, 7–6^{(4)}, 1–6 |
| Loss | 10. | 13 October 2003 | Carcavelos, Portugal | Clay | (Bulgaria) Sesil Karatantcheva | 5–7, 3–6 |

=== Doubles (28–10) ===
| Result | No. | Date | Tournament | Surface | Partner | Opponents | Score |
|---|---|---|---|---|---|---|---|
| Win | 1. | 29 January 1996 | Mallorca, Spain | Clay | (Spain) Laura García | (Spain) Marina Escobar (Spain) Conchita Martinez Granados | 5–7, 6–0, 6–2 |
| Win | 2. | 4 August 1997 | Périgueux, France | Clay | (Bosnia and Herzegovina) Sandra Martinović | (France) Geraldine Bimes (France) Victoria Courmes | 6–4, 6–3 |
| Loss | 1. | 31 August 1997 | Athens, Greece | Clay | (Spain) Marina Escobar | (Russia) Evgenia Kulikovskaya (Federal Republic of Yugoslavia) Sandra Načuk | 4–6, 3–6 |
| Win | 3. | 24 November 1997 | Mallorca, Spain | Clay | (Spain) Marina Escobar | (Austria) Melanie Schnell (Hungary) Katalin Marosi | 6–4, 6–2 |
| Win | 4. | 19 April 1998 | Galatina, Italy | Clay | (Spain) Noelia Serra | (Slovakia) Silvia Uríčková (Netherlands) Debby Haak | 6–4, 6–1 |
| Win | 5. | 26 April 1998 | Bari, Italy | Clay | (Argentina) Veronica Stele | (Italy) Sabina Da Ponte (Slovakia) Silvia Uríčková | 6–1, 6–1 |
| Win | 6. | 10 May 1998 | Elvas, Portugal | Hard | (Netherlands) Debby Haak | (Spain) Marina Escobar (Spain) Paula Hermida | w/o |
| Win | 7. | 1 June 1998 | Bytom, Poland | Clay | (Spain) Mariam Ramón Climent | (Slovakia) Ľudmila Cervanová (Slovakia) Janette Husárová | 6–3, 6–3 |
| Loss | 2. | 20 July 1998 | Valladolid, Spain | Hard | (Spain) Eva Bes | (Spain) Gisela Riera (Tunisia) Selima Sfar | 6–7^{(5)}, 6–7^{(3)} |
| Win | 8. | 21 September 1998 | Bucharest, Romania | Clay | (Spain) Eva Bes | (Czech Republic) Lenka Cenková (Austria) Karin Kschwendt | 4–6, 7–6^{(6)}, 6–0 |
| Win | 9. | 11 October 1998 | Girona, Spain | Clay | (Spain) Lourdes Domínguez Lino | (Spain) Marta Marrero (Spain) María José Martínez Sánchez | 4–6, 6–1, 7–6 |
| Win | 10. | 7 February 1999 | Mallorca, Spain | Clay | (Spain) Lourdes Domínguez Lino | (Italy) Alice Canepa (Argentina) María Fernanda Landa | 6–1, 6–1 |
| Loss | 3. | 15 March 1999 | Dinan, France | Clay (i) | (Spain) Mariam Ramón Climent | (Slovakia) Janette Husárová (Hungary) Rita Kuti-Kis | 4–6, 2–6 |
| Loss | 4. | 5 July 1999 | Civitanova Marche, Italy | Clay | (Spain) Conchita Martínez Granados | (Denmark) Eva Dyrberg (Slovakia) Daniela Hantuchová | 6–7^{(3)}, 6–4, 4–6 |
| Win | 11. | 12 July 1999 | Getxo, Spain | Clay | (Spain) Conchita Martínez Granados | (Spain) Gisela Riera (Spain) Alicia Ortuño | 7–6^{(4)}, 6–4 |
| Win | 12. | 30 August 1999 | Denain, France | Clay | (Spain) Conchita Martínez Granados | (Spain) Mariam Ramón Climent (Argentina) Luciana Masante | 6–1, 6–4 |
| Win | 13. | 20 September 1999 | Sofia, Bulgaria | Clay | (Spain) Conchita Martínez Granados | (Hungary) Katalin Marosi (Belarus) Nadejda Ostrovskaya | w/o |
| Loss | 5. | 15 May 2000 | Porto, Portugal | Clay | (Spain) Conchita Martínez Granados | (Spain) Eva Bes (Spain) Gisela Riera | 3–6, 3–6 |
| Win | 14. | 3 July 2000 | Civitanova Marche, Italy | Clay | (Spain) Conchita Martínez Granados | (Russia) Evgenia Kulikovskaya (Belarus) Tatiana Poutchek | 6–2, 6–3 |
| Win | 15. | 23 July 2000 | Fontanafredda, Italy | Clay | (Spain) Conchita Martínez Granados | (Slovenia) Maja Matevžič (Italy) Antonella Serra Zanetti | 4–6, 6–2, 6–4 |
| Win | 16. | 4 September 2000 | Fano, Italy | Clay | (Spain) Conchita Martínez Granados | (Greece) Eleni Daniilidou (Spain) Alicia Ortuño | 6–2, 6–4 |
| Win | 17. | 5 February 2001 | Mallorca, Spain | Clay | (Russia) Dinara Safina | (Romania) Oana Elena Golimbioschi (Romania) Andreea Ehritt-Vanc | 6–2, 6–0 |
| Win | 18. | 7 May 2001 | Maglie, Italy | Clay | (Argentina) Eugenia Chialvo | (Argentina) Natalia Gussoni (Argentina) Luciana Masante | 6–4, 6–4 |
| Win | 19. | 4 February 2002 | Mallorca, Spain | Clay | (Spain) Mariam Ramón Climent | (Austria) Jennifer Schmidt (Sweden) Maria Wolfbrandt | 6–2, 6–3 |
| Win | 20. | 18 February 2002 | Gran Canaria, Spain | Clay | (Russia) Dinara Safina | (Austria) Jennifer Schmidt (Sweden) Maria Wolfbrandt | 6–1, 6–2 |
| Loss | 6. | 29 September 2002 | Lecce, Italy | Clay | (Italy) Elisa Balsamo | (Romania) Andreea Ehritt-Vanc (Romania) Edina Gallovits-Hall | 7–6^{(5)}, 3–6, 3–6 |
| Win | 21. | 24 November 2002 | Mallorca, Spain | Clay | (Brazil) Joana Cortez | (Czech Republic) Ema Janašková (Czech Republic) Vladimíra Uhlířová | 6–3, 6–1 |
| Win | 22. | 1 December 2002 | Mallorca, Spain | Clay | (Serbia and Montenegro) Ana Timotić | (France) Iryna Brémond (Russia) Marianna Yuferova | 6–4, 6–3 |
| Loss | 7. | 17 March 2003 | Castellón, Spain | Clay | (Spain) Mariam Ramón Climent | (Slovakia) Ľudmila Cervanová (Slovakia) Stanislava Hrozenská | 6–4, 3–6, 0–6 |
| Loss | 8. | 5 October 2003 | Caserta, Italy | Clay | (Morocco) Bahia Mouhtassine | (Estonia) Maret Ani (Italy) Giulia Casoni | 5–7, 5–7 |
| Win | 23. | 19 October 2003 | Carcavelos, Portugal | Clay | (France) Céline Beigbeder | (Colombia) Romy Farah (Portugal) Neuza Silva | 6–2, 1–0 ret. |
| Win | 24. | 15 February 2004 | Mallorca, Spain | Clay | (Serbia and Montenegro) Ana Timotić | (Spain) Lourdes Domínguez Lino (Spain) Laura Pous Tió | 3–6, 6–4, 6–4 |
| Win | 25. | 25 April 2004 | Bari, Italy | Clay | (Spain) Conchita Martínez Granados | (Germany) Martina Müller (Czech Republic) Vladimíra Uhlířová | 6–2, 5–7, 6–2 |
| Win | 26. | 23 May 2004 | Caserta, Italy | Clay | (Romania) Andreea Ehritt-Vanc | (Italy) Giulia Casoni (Czech Republic) Vladimíra Uhlířová | 6–1, 4–6, 6–4 |
| Win | 27. | 7 July 2004 | Grado, Italy | Clay | (Romania) Andreea Ehritt-Vanc | (Poland) Klaudia Jans (Poland) Alicja Rosolska | 6–2, 6–2 |
| Loss | 9. | 2 August 2004 | Rimini, Italy | Clay | (Romania) Andreea Ehritt-Vanc | (Ukraine) Yuliana Fedak (Ukraine) Mariya Koryttseva | 6–7^{(7)}, 3–6 |
| Win | 28. | 31 August 2004 | Mestre, Italy | Clay | (Spain) Lourdes Domínguez Lino | (Hungary) Katalin Marosi (Brazil) Marina Tavares | 6–1, 6–2 |
| Loss | 10. | 19 April 2005 | Valencia, Spain | Hard | (Spain) Arantxa Parra Santonja | (France) Kildine Chevalier (France) Stéphanie Foretz | 6–4, 6–7^{(5)}, 2–6 |
