= 1998 Copa Colsanitas =

- Date: 16–22 February
- Edition: 1st
- Category: Tier IV
- Draw: 32S / 16D
- Prize money: $107,500
- Surface: Clay / outdoor
- Location: Bogotá, Colombia
- Venue: Club Campestre El Rancho

Champions

Singles
- (Argentina) Paola Suárez

Doubles
- (Slovakia) Janette Husárová / (Argentina) Paola Suárez
Copa Colsanitas	· 1999 →

The 1998 Copa Colsanitas was a women's tennis tournament played on outdoor clay courts at the Club Campestre El Rancho in Bogotá in Colombia that was part of Tier IV of the 1998 WTA Tour. The tournament was held from 16 February through 22 February 1998. Unseeded Paola Suárez won the singles title.

== Finals ==
=== Singles ===
(Argentina) Paola Suárez defeated (Canada) Sonya Jeyaseelan 6–3, 6–4

- It was Suárez's only singles title of the year and the 1st of her career.

=== Doubles ===
(Slovakia) Janette Husárová / (Argentina) Paola Suárez defeated (Venezuela) Melissa Mazzotta / (Russia) Ekaterina Sysoeva 3–6, 6–2, 6–3

- It was Husárová's only title of the year and the 4th of her career. It was Suárez's 3rd title of the year and the 4th of her career.
