= Katalin Marosi =

Hungarian tennis player

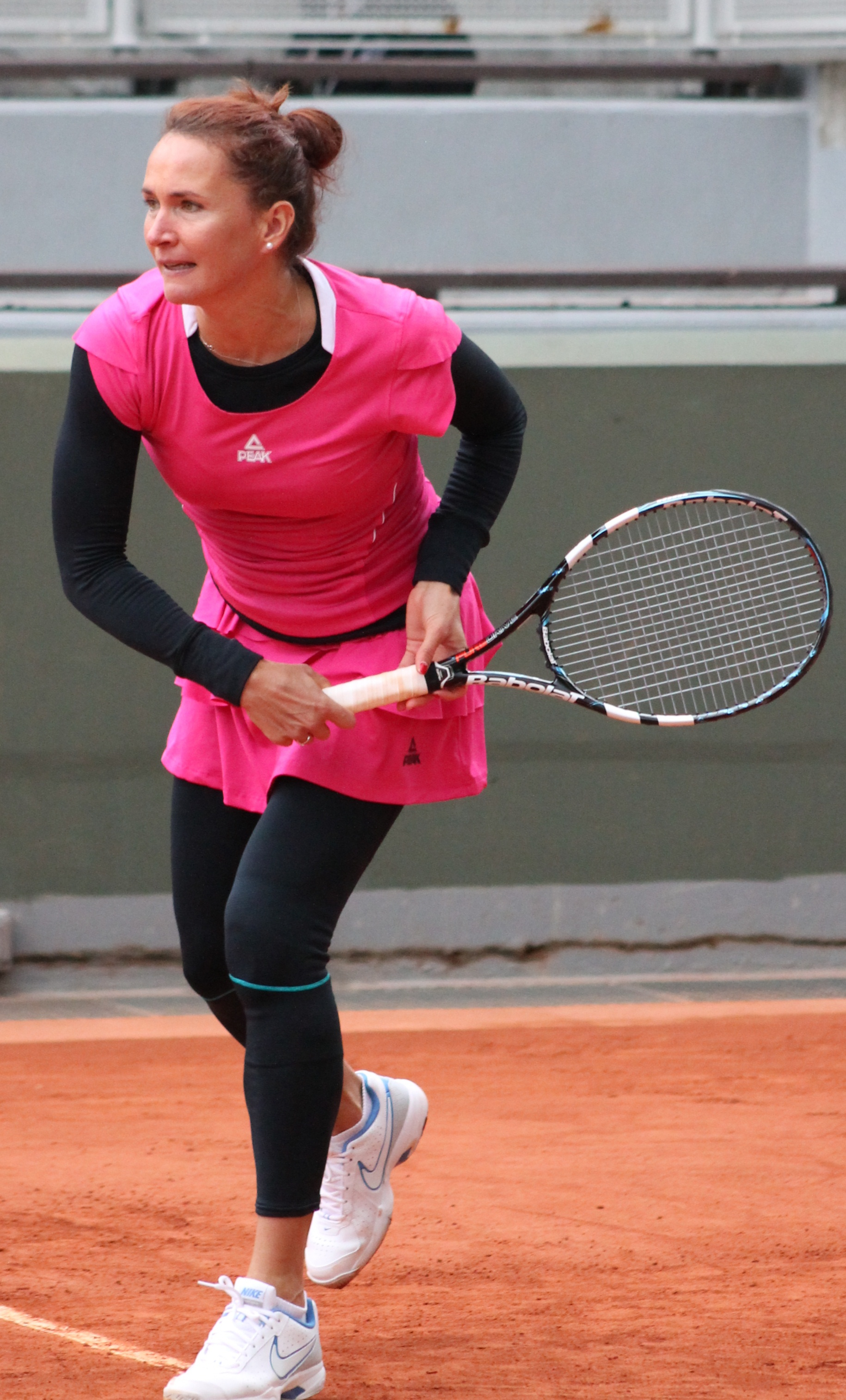
- Marosi at Roland Garros, 2013
- Country (sports): Hungary
- Residence: Budapest, Hungary
- Born: 12 November 1979 (age 46) Gheorgheni, Romania
- Height: 1.78 m (5 ft 10 in)
- Turned pro: October 1995
- Plays: Right (two-handed backhand)
- Prize money: $768,897

Singles
- Career record: 393–297
- Career titles: 15 ITF
- Highest ranking: No. 101 (8 May 2000)

Grand Slam singles results
- Australian Open: 1R (2001)
- French Open: 1R (2000)
- Wimbledon: 2R (2000)
- US Open: 1R (2000)

Other tournaments
- Olympic Games: 1R (2000)

Doubles
- Career record: 358–297
- Career titles: 31 ITF
- Highest ranking: No. 33 (6 May 2013)

Grand Slam doubles results
- Australian Open: 3R (2000)
- French Open: 2R (2013)
- Wimbledon: 2R (2012)
- US Open: 2R (2012, 2013)

Other doubles tournaments
- Olympic Games: QF (2000)

Grand Slam mixed doubles results
- Wimbledon: 3R (2013)

Katalin Marosi (born 12 November 1979) is a Hungarian former professional tennis player.

In her career, Marosi won 15 singles and 31 doubles titles on the ITF Women's Circuit. On 8 May 2000, she reached her best singles ranking of world No. 101. On 6 May 2013, she peaked at No. 33 in the doubles rankings.

Playing for Hungary Fed Cup team, Marosi has a win–loss record of 15–13.

== Early life ==
Her mother Ildiko is a secretary and her father Sandor a gymnastics trainer; she has an older brother (Peter). Marosi was introduced to tennis at age six by Antal and Eva Elekes in Budapest. Favorite surface of the all-court player was hardcourt, favorite shot forehand. Best memories include warming-up her serve with Steffi Graf in 1996 Roland Garros juniors, and winning her first ITF event. Marosi admired Graf because she knew everything about tennis and was so good mentally.

== WTA Tour finals ==
=== Doubles: 3 (3 runner-ups) ===
Legend Grand Slam tournaments Premier M & Premier 5 Premier International (0–3)	Finals by surface Hard (0–0) Clay (0–3) Grass (0–0) Carpet (0–0)

Result	No.	Date	Tournament	Surface	Partner	Opponents	Score
Loss	1.	May 2009	Portugal Open	Clay	(Canada) Sharon Fichman	(United States) Raquel Atawo (United States) Abigail Spears	6–2, 3–6, [5–10]
Loss	2.	Jul 2012	Palermo Ladies Open, Italy	Clay	(Croatia) Darija Jurak	(Czech Republic) Renata Voráčová (Czech Republic) Barbora Strýcová	6–7^{(5–7)}, 4–6
Loss	3.	May 2013	Portugal Open	Clay	(Croatia) Darija Jurak	(Chinese Taipei) Chan Hao-ching (France) Kristina Mladenovic	6–7^{(3–7)}, 2–6

== ITF Circuit finals ==
$100,000 tournaments
$75,000 tournaments
$50,000 tournaments
$25,000 tournaments
$10,000 tournaments

=== Singles: 22 (15 titles, 7 runner-ups) ===
Result	No.	Date	Tournament	Surface	Opponent	Score
Loss	1.	18 September 1995	ITF Cluj, Romania	Clay	(Romania) Raluca Sandu	3–6, 3–6
Win	1.	4 December 1995	ITF São Paulo, Brazil	Hard	(United States) Meghann Shaughnessy	6–0, 6–2
Win	2.	8 July 1996	ITF Vigo, Spain	Clay	(Spain) Gisela Riera	6–1, 6–2
Win	3.	25 November 1996	ITF São Paulo	Hard	(United States) Keirsten Alley	6–7^{(2)}, 6–3, 6–4
Win	4.	2 December 1996	ITF São Paulo	Hard	(United States) Keirsten Alley	6–3, 6–1
Win	5.	7 April 1997	ITF Viña del Mar, Chile	Clay	(Argentina) Celeste Contín	6–1, 6–4
Win	6.	26 May 1997	ITF Barcelona, Spain	Clay	(Spain) Marta Cano	6–2, 6–3
Loss	2.	28 September 1998	ITF Córdoba, Argentina	Clay	(Argentina) Erica Krauth	6–2, 1–6, 4–6
Win	7.	30 November 1998	ITF Guadalajara, Mexico	Clay	(Brazil) Vanessa Menga	7–5, 6–3
—N/a		10 October 1999	Batumi Ladies Open, Georgia	Carpet	(Germany) Julia Abe	not finished
Win	8.	13 December 1999	ITF New Delhi, India	Hard	(Italy) Tathiana Garbin	6–2, 1–1 ret.
Loss	3.	6 March 2000	ITF Haikou, China	Hard	(China) Yi Jingqian	6–4, 0–6, 1–6
Win	9.	27 November 2000	ITF Tucson, United States	Hard	(Russia) Alina Jidkova	6–7^{(3)}, 6–4, 6–3
Win	10.	21 May 2002	ITF Torino, Italy	Clay	(Croatia) Maja Palaveršić	4–6, 6–1, 6–0
Loss	4.	12 July 2004	ITF Campos do Jordão, Brazil	Hard	(Brazil) Maria Fernanda Alves	5–7, 6–7^{(2)}
Win	11.	16 August 2004	ITF Kędzierzyn-Koźle, Poland	Clay	(Czech Republic) Veronika Raimrová	6–4, 4–6, 6–2
Win	12.	30 August 2005	ITF Gliwice, Poland	Clay	(Poland) Natalia Kołat	6–1, 6–3
Win	13.	21 May 2006	ITF Budapest, Hungary	Clay	(Serbia and Montenegro) Nataša Zorić	6–4, 7–5
Win	14.	26 June 2006	ITF Salzburg, Austria	Clay	(Austria) Sandra Klemenschits	w/o
Win	15.	28 April 2008	ITF Bell Ville, Argentina	Clay	(Argentina) Aranza Salut	6–2, 6–2
Loss	5.	11 August 2008	Palić Open, Serbia	Clay	(Slovakia) Lenka Wienerová	5–7, 6–7^{(6)}
Loss	6.	29 June 2009	ITF Stuttgart, Germany	Clay	(Kazakhstan) Zarina Diyas	1–6, 2–6
Loss	7.	31 August 2009	ITF Maribor, Slovenia	Clay	(Romania) Simona Halep	4–6, 2–6

=== Doubles: 55 (31 titles, 24 runner-ups) ===
Result	No.	Date	Tournament	Surface	Partner	Opponents	Score
Win	1.	30 October 1995	ITF Santiago, Chile	Clay	(Brazil) Miriam D'Agostini	(Chile) Bárbara Castro (Chile) María-Alejandra Quezada	6–0, 6–3
Win	2.	6 November 1995	ITF São Paulo, Brazil	Clay	(Brazil) Miriam D'Agostini	(Argentina) Laura Montalvo (Argentina) Cintia Tortorella	6–1, 1–6, 7–5
Win	3.	13 November 1995	ITF Buenos Aires, Argentina	Clay	(Brazil) Miriam D'Agostini	(Argentina) Florencia Cianfagna (Argentina) Paola Suárez	6–7^{(4)}, 6–0, 6–3
Loss	1.	4 December 1995	ITF São Paulo	Hard	(South Africa) Nannie de Villiers	(Brazil) Vanessa Menga (Brazil) Luciana Tella	3–6, 2–6
Win	4.	9 December 1996	ITF São Paulo	Clay	(Argentina) Florencia Cianfagna	(United States) Keirsten Alley (United States) Paige Yaroshuk	6–4, 6–7^{(4)}, 6–3
Win	5.	7 April 1997	ITF Viña del Mar, Chile	Clay	(Argentina) Veronica Stele	(Argentina) Celeste Contín (Argentina) Luciana Masante	6–1, 5–7, 6–2
Loss	2.	26 May 1997	ITF Barcelona, Spain	Clay	(Argentina) Veronica Stele	(Netherlands) Kim de Weille (Netherlands) Amanda Hopmans	4–6, 7–5, 4–6
Win	6.	9 June 1997	ITF Budapest, Hungary	Clay	(Argentina) Veronica Stele	(Ukraine) Elena Tatarkova (Colombia) Fabiola Zuluaga	6–3, 6–3
Win	7.	16 June 1997	Open de Marseille, France	Clay	(Argentina) Veronica Stele	(France) Caroline Dhenin (Georgia (country)) Nino Louarsabishvili	6–2, 4–6, 6–1
Win	8.	30 June 1997	ITF Mont-de-Marsan, France	Clay	(Argentina) Veronica Stele	(Japan) Saori Obata (Japan) Nami Urabe	6–4, 6–3
Loss	3.	29 September 1997	ITF Otočec, Slovenia	Clay	(Hungary) Petra Mandula	(Czech Republic) Lenka Cenková (Czech Republic) Kateřina Kroupová	5–7, 6–7^{(3)}
Loss	4.	10 November 1997	ITF Le Havre, France	Clay (i)	(Germany) Caroline Schneider	(Austria) Melanie Schnell (United States) Julie Steven	2–6, 6–3, 6–7^{(3)}
Loss	5.	17 November 1997	ITF Deauville, France	Clay (i)	(Germany) Caroline Schneider	(Germany) Julia Abe (Bulgaria) Lubomira Bacheva	6–2, 6–4
Loss	6.	24 November 1997	ITF Mallorca, Spain	Clay	(Austria) Melanie Schnell	(Spain) Rosa María Andrés Rodríguez (Spain) Marina Escobar	4–6, 2–6
Win	9.	1 December 1997	ITF Mallorca, Spain	Clay	(Austria) Melanie Schnell	(Spain) Marta Cano (Spain) Conchita Martínez Granados	6–4, 4–6, 7–5
Loss	7.	5 October 1998	ITF Santiago, Chile	Clay	(Brazil) Miriam D'Agostini	(Argentina) Laura Montalvo (Argentina) Paola Suárez	1–6, 2–6
Loss	8.	30 November 1998	ITF Guadalajara, Mexico	Clay	(Brazil) Miriam D'Agostini	(United States) Lindsay Lee-Waters (United States) Meghann Shaughnessy	1–6, 3–6
Win	10.	22 February 1999	ITF Bushey, United Kingdom	Carpet (i)	(Switzerland) Emmanuelle Gagliardi	(Bulgaria) Svetlana Krivencheva (Slovenia) Tina Križan	6–7^{(4)}, 6–2, 7–6^{(0)}
Win	11.	26 April 1999	ITF Espinho, Portugal	Clay	(Spain) Alicia Ortuño	(Italy) Francesca Lubiani (Italy) Maria Paola Zavagli	6–3, 6–4
Loss	9.	30 August 1999	ITF Fano, Italy	Clay	(Spain) Alicia Ortuño	(Netherlands) Debby Haak (Netherlands) Andrea van den Hurk	1–6, 4–6
Loss	10.	20 September 1999	ITF Sofia, Bulgaria	Clay	(Belarus) Nadejda Ostrovskaya	(Spain) Rosa María Andrés Rodríguez (Spain) Conchita Martínez Granados	w/o
Loss	11.	28 February 2000	ITF Chengdu, China	Hard	(Brazil) Joana Cortez	(China) Li Na (China) Li Ting	1–6, 3–6
Win	12.	3 April 2000	Al Habtoor Challenge, United Arab Emirates	Hard	(Italy) Tathiana Garbin	(Germany) Angelika Bachmann (Slovenia) Tina Križan	7–6^{(5)}, 6–3
Win	13.	9 October 2000	ITF Poitiers, France	Hard (i)	(Netherlands) Yvette Basting	(Hungary) Petra Mandula (Austria) Patricia Wartusch	7–6^{(4)}, 6–1
Win	14.	27 November 2000	ITF Tucson, United States	Hard	(South Africa) Liezel Huber	(United States) Dawn Buth (United States) Jolene Watanabe	6–4, 6–2
Loss	12.	2 April 2001	Al Habtoor Challenge, United Arab Emirates	Hard	(France) Caroline Dhenin	(Belgium) Laurence Courtois (Netherlands) Seda Noorlander	3–6, 0–6
Loss	13.	23 July 2001	ITF Ettenheim, Germany	Clay	(Kazakhstan) Irina Selyutina	(Denmark) Eva Dyrberg (Slovenia) Maja Matevžič	w/o
Win	15.	3 September 2001	ITF Fano, Italy	Clay	(Italy) Giulia Casoni	(Spain) Eva Bes-Ostariz (Spain) Gisela Riera	6–3, 6–4
Win	16.	24 September 2001	Batumi Ladies Open, Georgia	Carpet	(Belarus) Tatiana Poutchek	(Belarus) Nadejda Ostrovskaya (Russia) Anastasia Rodionova	6–3, 7–6^{(3)}
Loss	14.	21 May 2002	ITF Torino, Italy	Clay	(Argentina) Erica Krauth	(Federal Republic of Yugoslavia) Katarina Mišić (Federal Republic of Yugoslavia) Dragana Zarić	6–7^{(5)}, 3–6
Loss	15.	27 May 2002	ITF Mostar, Bosnia and Herzegovina	Clay	(Federal Republic of Yugoslavia) Katarina Mišić	(Slovenia) Tina Hergold (Federal Republic of Yugoslavia) Sandra Načuk	6–3, 6–3
Win	17.	22 July 2002	ITF Český Krumlov, Czech Republic	Clay	(Slovenia) Tina Hergold	(Czech Republic) Gabriela Chmelinová (Czech Republic) Milena Nekvapilová	6–7^{(2)}, 5–7
Win	18.	3 December 2002	ITF Boynton Beach, U.S.	Clay	(United States) Samantha Reeves	(Russia) Alina Jidkova (Russia) Lina Krasnoroutskaya	2–6, 6–7^{(5)}
Win	19.	22 June 2004	ITF Fontanafredda, Italy	Clay	(Argentina) Erica Krauth	(Germany) Martina Müller (Czech Republic) Vladimíra Uhlířová	2–6, 6–3, 6–2
—N/a	NP	18 July 2004	ITF Campos do Jordão, Brazil	Hard	(Portugal) Frederica Piedade	(Brazil) Maria Fernanda Alves (Brazil) Carla Tiene	NP
Win	20.	16 August 2004	ITF Kędzierzyn-Koźle, Poland	Clay	(Brazil) Marina Tavares	(Czech Republic) Iveta Gerlová (Czech Republic) Sandra Záhlavová	1–6, 6–4, 6–2
Loss	16.	31 August 2004	ITF Mestre, Italy	Clay	(Brazil) Marina Tavares	(Spain) Rosa María Andrés Rodríguez (Spain) Lourdes Domínguez Lino	1–6, 2–6
Loss	17.	10 May 2005	ITF Casale Monferrato, Italy	Clay	(Italy) Gloria Pizzichini	(Brazil) Joana Cortez (Brazil) Roxane Vaisemberg	2–6, 0–6
Loss	18.	23 August 2005	ITF Maribor, Slovenia	Clay	(Brazil) Marina Tavares	(Sweden) Mari Andersson (Sweden) Kristina Andlovic	6–7^{(2)}, 3–6
Loss	19.	27 September 2005	ITF Volos, Greece	Carpet	(Brazil) Marina Tavares	(Italy) Nicole Clerico (Finland) Katariina Tuohimaa	4–6, 2–6
Win	21.	4 October 2005	ITF Rome, Italy	Clay	(Brazil) Marina Tavares	(Italy) Giulia Meruzzi (Italy) Nancy Rustignoli	w/o
Win	22.	26 June 2006	ITF Salzburg, Austria	Clay	(Brazil) Marina Tavares	(Austria) Daniela Klemenschits (Austria) Sandra Klemenschits	3–6, 7–6^{(2)}, 6–3
Win	23.	16 June 2008	ITF Davos, Switzerland	Clay	(Brazil) Marina Tavares	(Czech Republic) Kateřina Kramperová (Austria) Janina Toljan	5–7, 6–4, [10–7]
Loss	20.	30 June 2008	ITF Stuttgart, Germany	Clay	(Brazil) Marina Tavares	(Germany) Kristina Barrois (Germany) Laura Siegemund	3–6, 4–6
Win	24.	20 October 2008	Challenger de Saguenay, Canada	Hard (i)	(Brazil) Marina Tavares	(Canada) Gabriela Dabrowski (Canada) Sharon Fichman	2–6, 6–4, [10–4]
Win	25.	16 March 2009	ITF Cairo, Egypt	Clay	(Hungary) Anikó Kapros	(United States) Megan Moulton-Levy (Germany) Laura Siegemund	7–5, 6–3
Win	26.	23 March 2009	ITF Latina, Italy	Clay	(Brazil) Marina Tavares	(Russia) Ekaterina Lopes (Russia) Marina Shamayko	6–2, 6–0
Win	27.	29 June 2009	ITF Stuttgart, Germany	Clay	(Germany) Laura Siegemund	(Netherlands) Leonie Mekel (Germany) Kathrin Wörle	7–6^{(2)}, 6–7^{(6)}, [10–4]
Loss	21.	30 November 2009	Zubr Cup, Czech Republic	Hard (i)	(Croatia) Darija Jurak	(Austria) Sandra Klemenschits (Slovenia) Andreja Klepač	7–6^{(3)}, 3–6, [10–7]
Loss	22.	6 June 2011	ITF Zlín, Czech Republic	Clay	(Hungary) Réka Luca Jani	(Ukraine) Yuliya Beygelzimer (Georgia (country)) Margalita Chakhnashvili	6–3, 1–6, [8–10]
Win	28.	12 September 2011	Zagreb Ladies Open, Croatia	Clay	(Portugal) Maria João Koehler	(Croatia) Maria Abramović (Romania) Mihaela Buzărnescu	6–0, 6–3
Win	29.	19 September 2011	GB Pro-Series Shrewsbury, UK	Hard (i)	(Portugal) Maria João Koehler	(United Kingdom) Amanda Elliott (Australia) Johanna Konta	7–6^{(3)}, 6–1
Loss	23.	19 December 2011	Ankara Cup, Turkey	Hard (i)	(Slovakia) Janette Husárová	(Russia) Nina Bratchikova (Croatia) Darija Jurak	4–6, 2–6
Win	30.	5 March 2012	ITF Irapuato, Mexico	Hard	(Slovakia) Janette Husárová	(Italy) Maria Elena Camerin (Ukraine) Mariya Koryttseva	6–2, 6–7^{(9)}, [10–7]
Win	31.	12 March 2012	The Bahamas Open	Hard	(Slovakia) Janette Husárová	(Czech Republic) Eva Birnerová (United Kingdom) Anne Keothavong	6–1, 3–6, [10–6]
Loss	24.	7 May 2012	Open de Cagnes-sur-Mer, France	Clay	(Czech Republic) Renata Voráčová	(Russia) Alexandra Panova (Poland) Urszula Radwańska	5–7, 6–4, [6–10]

== Grand Slam performance timelines ==
Key
W	F	SF	QF	#R	RR	Q#	DNQ	A	NH

(W) winner; (F) finalist; (SF) semifinalist; (QF) quarterfinalist; (#R) rounds 4, 3, 2, 1; (RR) round-robin stage; (Q#) qualification round; (DNQ) did not qualify; (A) absent; (NH) not held; (SR) strike rate (events won / competed); (W–L) win–loss record.

=== Singles ===
Tournament	1996	1997	1998	1999	2000	2001	2002	2003	2004	2005	2006	2007	2008	2009	2010	2011	W–L
Australian Open	A	A	A	Q1	Q2	1R	Q3	Q1	Q2	A	A	A	A	Q3	Q2	A	7–8
French Open	A	A	A	A	1R	Q1	A	Q3	Q1	A	A	A	A	Q1	Q1	A	2–6
Wimbledon	A	A	A	Q3	2R	Q1	Q1	Q1	A	A	A	A	A	Q1	Q1	A	3–7
US Open	Q1	A	A	Q2	1R	Q1	Q2	Q1	A	A	A	A	A	Q2	A	Q1	3–8
Overall W–L	0 / 0	0 / 0	0 / 0	0 / 0	1 / 3	0 / 1	0 / 0	0 / 0	0 / 0	0 / 0	0 / 0	0 / 0	0 / 0	0 / 0	0 / 0	0 / 0	15 / 29

=== Doubles ===
Tournament	1998	1999	2000	2001	2002	2003	2004	2005	2006	2007	2008	2009	2010	2011	2012	2013	2014	2015	W–L
Australian Open	1R	A	3R	2R	1R	2R	1R	A	A	A	A	A	A	A	A	2R	A	A	5–7
French Open	1R	1R	1R	1R	A	1R	A	A	A	A	A	A	A	A	1R	2R	A	A	1–7
Wimbledon	A	1R	1R	1R	A	1R	A	A	A	A	A	1R	1R	1R	2R	1R	A	1R	1–10
US Open	A	1R	1R	1R	A	1R	A	A	A	A	A	A	A	A	2R	2R	A	1R	2–7
Overall W–L	0 / 2	0 / 3	2 / 4	1 / 4	0 / 1	1 / 4	0 / 1	0 / 0	0 / 0	0 / 0	0 / 0	0 / 1	0 / 1	0 / 1	2 / 3	3 / 4	0 / 0	0 / 2	9 / 31
