= Christína Papadáki =

Greek tennis player (born 1973)

- Country (sports): Greece
- Residence: Athens
- Born: 24 February 1973 (age 53) Athens
- Turned pro: 1989
- Retired: 1999
- Plays: Right (two-handed backhand)
- Prize money: $300,093

Singles
- Career record: 166–145
- Career titles: 0 WTA, 5 ITF
- Highest ranking: No. 72 (10 May 1999)

Grand Slam singles results
- Australian Open: 1R (1994, 1999)
- French Open: 2R (1993)
- Wimbledon: 1R (1999)
- US Open: 1R (1993, 1999)

Other tournaments
- Olympic Games: 1R (1992, 1996)

Doubles
- Career record: 116–92
- Career titles: 1 WTA, 9 ITF
- Highest ranking: No. 75 (5 July 1999)

Grand Slam doubles results
- Australian Open: 1R (1994, 1996, 1997, 1999)
- French Open: 2R (1999)
- Wimbledon: 2R (1996, 1999)
- US Open: 1R (1996, 1999)

Other doubles tournaments
- Olympic Games: 1R (1992, 1996)

Mixed doubles
- Career record: 0–2
- Career titles: 0

Grand Slam mixed doubles results
- Wimbledon: 1R (1996, 1999)

Team competitions
- Fed Cup: 30–30

Christína Papadáki (Greek: Χριστίνα Παπαδάκη) (born 24 February 1973) is a former tennis player from Greece who turned professional in 1989.

Her biggest career achievement was reaching the final of the Copa Colsanitas tournament in 1999, losing to Fabiola Zuluaga and winning the doubles title with Seda Noorlander in the same tournament. Papadaki reached her career-high ranking of world No. 72 in May 1999.

She played in the Fed Cup for Greece every year from 1991 to 1999, and compiled a 30–30 win–loss record in these ties. Papadáki twice represented Greece at the Summer Olympics, in 1992 and 1996. She retired from professional tennis in 1999.

== WTA Tour finals ==
=== Singles: 1 (runner-up) ===
Legend
Tier I (0–0)
Tier II (0–0)
Tier III (0–0)
Tier IV & V (0–1)

Result	Date	Tournament	Surface	Opponent	Score
Loss	Feb 1999	Copa Colsanitas, Bogotá	Clay	(Colombia) Fabiola Zuluaga	1–6, 3–6

=== Doubles: 1 (title) ===
Tier I (0–0)
Tier II (0–0)
Tier III (0–0)
Tier IV & V (1–0)

Result	Date	Tournament	Surface	Partners	Opponents	Score
Win	Feb 1999	Copa Colsanitas, Bogotá	Clay	(Netherlands) Seda Noorlander	(Argentina) Laura Montalvo (Argentina) Paola Suárez	6–4, 7–6^{(7–5)}

== ITF finals ==
Legend
$75,000 tournaments
$50,000 tournaments
$25,000 tournaments
$10,000 tournaments

=== Singles (5–4) ===
Result	No.	Date	Location	Surface	Opponent	Score
Loss	1.	7 January 1991	Midland, United States	Hard (i)	(United States) Jessica Emmons	5–7, 2–6
Loss	2.	17 July 1995	Getxo, Spain	Clay	(Spain) Gala León García	3–6, 4–6
Loss	3.	18 February 1996	Cali, Colombia	Clay	(Slovakia) Henrieta Nagyová	2–6, 6–7
Win	1.	12 October 1997	Tampico, Mexico	Hard	(Netherlands) Seda Noorlander	6–3, 6–4
Loss	4.	5 April 1998	Athens, Greece	Clay	(Hungary) Kira Nagy	5–7, 6–2, 3–6
Win	2.	10 May 1998	Midlothian, United States	Clay	(Italy) Maria Paola Zavagli	7–5, 6–4
Win	3.	24 May 1998	Spartanburg, United States	Clay	(United States) Tracy Singian	6–3, 6–0
Win	4.	13 September 1998	Mexico City, Mexico	Hard	(Netherlands) Seda Noorlander	6–3, 6–1
Win	5.	18 October 1998	São Paulo, Brazil	Hard	(Italy) Francesca Schiavone	4–6, 6–4, 6–2

=== Doubles (9–5) ===
Result	No.	Date	Location	Surface	Partner	Opponents	Score
Loss	1.	28 September 1992	Athens, Greece	Clay	(Greece) Christina Zachariadou	(Netherlands) Evelyne Dullens (Sweden) Anneli Ornstedt	2–6, 4–6
Loss	2.	29 November 1993	Le Havre, France	Clay (i)	(United States) Julie Steven	(Czech Republic) Lenka Němečková (Czech Republic) Ludmila Richterová	1–6, 6–7
Win	1.	24 July 1994	Salisbury, United States	Hard	(South Africa) Mareze Joubert	(South Africa) Liezel Horn (Japan) Hiroko Mochizuki	3–6, 6–1, 6–4
Win	2.	20 February 1995	Newcastle, England	Carpet (i)	(Netherlands) Seda Noorlander	(Czech Republic) Sandra Kleinová (Czech Republic) Ludmila Varmužová	7–6^{(3)}, 6–3
Loss	3.	27 February 1995	Southampton, England	Carpet (i)	(Netherlands) Seda Noorlander	(Belgium) Dominique Monami (Hungary) Andrea Temesvari	4–6, 2–6
Win	3.	24 July 1996	Valladolid, Spain	Clay	(Australia) Louise Pleming	(Italy) Gloria Pizzichini (Italy) Sara Ventura	1–6, 6–2, 7–5
Win	4.	25 February 1996	Bogotá, Colombia	Clay	(Argentina) Mercedes Paz	(Hungary) Virág Csurgó (Czech Republic) Kateřina Kroupová-Šišková	7–6, 6–2
Win	5.	19 May 1996	Athens, Greece	Clay	(South Africa) Liezel Horn	(United States) Angela Lettiere (United States) Corina Morariu	7–5, 6–2
Loss	4.	18 August 1996	Bronx, United States	Hard	(South Africa) Liezel Horn	(Finland) Nanne Dahlman (United Kingdom) Clare Wood	2–6, 3–6
Win	6.	23 February 1997	Bogotá, Colombia	Clay	(Netherlands) Seda Noorlander	(Argentina) Laura Montalvo (Argentina) Mercedes Paz	7–6, 4–6, 7–5
Loss	5.	23 August 1998	Bronx, United States	Hard	(France) Sarah Pitkowski	(United Kingdom) Julie Pullin (United Kingdom) Lorna Woodroffe	3–6, 1–6
Win	7.	13 September 1998	Mexico City, Mexico	Hard	(Netherlands) Seda Noorlander	(Argentina) Celeste Contín (Mexico) Jessica Fernández	6–3, 6–1
Win	8.	4 October 1998	Thessaloniki, Greece	Clay	(Greece) Eleni Daniilidou	(Slovakia) Ľudmila Cervanová (Germany) Magdalena Kučerová	7–6^{(5)}, 4–6, 7–5
Win	9.	18 October 1998	São Paulo, Brazil	Clay	(Netherlands) Seda Noorlander	(Italy) Alice Canepa (Italy) Antonella Serra Zanetti	6–3, 6–7, 7–6
