= Martina Nejedly =

Canadian tennis player

- Country (sports): Canada
- Born: 26 May 1975 (age 49); Czechoslovakia
- Prize money: $79,727

Singles
- Career record: 127–159
- Career titles: 2 ITF
- Highest ranking: No. 179 (5 January 1998)

Doubles
- Career record: 43–92
- Career titles: 0
- Highest ranking: No. 336 (26 May 1997)

Team competitions
- Fed Cup: 3–2

Martina Nejedly (born 26 May 1975) is a former professional tennis player from Canada.

She is the younger sister of former tennis player Jana Nejedly.

== Biography ==
Nejedly immigrated to Canada from Czechoslovakia at the age of four. The family fled the communist country while on vacation to Yugoslavia, settling in Vancouver.

On the professional tour, she reached a best ranking in singles of 179 in the world. Her WTA Tour main-draw appearances included the 1999 Canadian Open, where she was beaten in the first round by then-world No. 27, Nathalie Dechy, in three sets. In 1999, she appeared in four ties for the Canada Fed Cup team.

== ITF Circuit finals ==
$25,000 tournaments
$10,000 tournaments

=== Singles: 6 (2–4) ===
Outcome	No.	Date	Tournament	Surface	Opponent	Score
Runner-up	1.	10 October 1993	ITF Zacatecas, Mexico	Hard	(Mexico) Lucila Becerra	1–6, 1–6
Runner-up	2.	24 June 1996	ITF Campo Grande, Brazil	Hard	(Dominican Republic) Joelle Schad	2–6, 7–5, 4–6
Runner-up	3.	21 July 1996	ITF São Paulo, Brazil	Clay	(Germany) Nina Nittinger	4–6, 4–6
Winner	1.	3 November 1996	ITF Minas Gerais, Brazil	Clay	(Argentina) Celeste Contín	7–6^{(2)}, 6–2
Winner	2.	23 June 1997	ITF Manaus, Brazil	Hard	(Argentina) Cintia Tortorella	6–4, 6–1
Runner-up	4.	14 December 1997	ITF Bogotá, Colombia	Clay	(Colombia) Fabiola Zuluaga	2–6, 1–6

=== Doubles: 1 (0–1) ===
Outcome	No.	Date	Tournament	Surface	Partner	Opponents	Score
Runner-up	1.	3 November 1996	ITF Minas Gerais, Brazil	Clay	(Brazil) Lilian Silva	(Argentina) Celeste Contín (Argentina) Romina Ottoboni	6–4, 4–6, 2–6

== See also ==
- List of Canada Fed Cup team representatives
