= Melissa Mazzotta =

Venezuelan tennis player

- Full name: Melissa Mazzotta
- Country (sports): Venezuela; United States
- Born: 21 June 1972 (age 54)
- Retired: 2000
- College: University of Miami
- Prize money: $90,904

Singles
- Career record: 138-142
- Career titles: 0 WTA, 1 ITF
- Highest ranking: No. 182 (3 March 1997)

Doubles
- Career record: 35-65
- Career titles: 0 WTA, 1 ITF
- Highest ranking: No. 132 (23 November 1998)

Melissa Mazzotta (born 21 June 1972) is a former professional tennis player from Venezuela.

== Biography ==
Mazzotta is originally from Caracas but is based in Florida. She was a two-time All-American collegiate tennis player at the University of Miami.

As a professional player, she reached a top singles ranking of 182 in the world. She featured in the qualifying draws of all four grand slam tournaments. Her WTA Tour career included a win over Rachel McQuillan in Los Angeles in 1994 and she was a doubles runner-up at Bogota in 1998.

She appeared in a total of six Fed Cup ties for her native Venezuela, two in 1991 and four in 1996.

Mazzotta lives in Miami, where she operates a preschool.

== WTA Tour finals ==
=== Doubles (0-1) ===
Result	Date	Tournament	Tier	Surface	Partner	Opponents	Score
Loss	February, 1998	Bogota, Colombia	Tier IV	Clay	(Russia) Ekaterina Sysoeva	(Slovakia) Janette Husárová (Argentina) Paola Suárez	6–3, 2–6, 3–6

== ITF finals ==
$50,000 tournaments
$25,000 tournaments
$10,000 tournaments

=== Singles (1–3) ===
Result	No.	Date	Tournament	Surface	Opponent	Score
Loss	1.	9 May 1988	Lee-on-the-Solent, United Kingdom	Clay	(Finland) Petra Thorén	2–6, 3–6
Win	2.	9 June 1991	Miramar, United States	Hard	(United States) Nicole Arendt	7-6, 6-1
Loss	3.	14 July 1991	Indianapolis, United States	Clay	(United States) Rachel Jensen	3-6, 0-6
Loss	4.	23 November 1997	Caracas, Venezuela	Hard	(United States) Katie Schlukebir	5-7, 5-7

=== Doubles (1-1) ===
Result	No.	Date	Tournament	Surface	Partner	Opponents	Score
Win	1.	1 June 1998	Tashkent, Uzbekistan	Hard	(Colombia) Fabiola Zuluaga	(Paraguay) Larissa Schaerer (Switzerland) Miroslava Vavrinec	6–2, 6–1
Loss	2.	5 July 1998	Orbetello, Italy	Clay	(Colombia) Fabiola Zuluaga	(Italy) Alice Canepa (Italy) Tathiana Garbin	2–6, 3–6
