= Celeste Contín =

Argentine tennis player

- Country (sports): Argentina
- Born: 17 February 1978 (age 48)
- Prize money: $68,132

Singles
- Career record: 177-116
- Career titles: 8 ITF
- Highest ranking: No. 198 (20 July 1998)

Doubles
- Career record: 121-85
- Career titles: 11 ITF
- Highest ranking: No. 142 (8 September 1997)

Celeste Contín (born 17 February 1978) is a former professional tennis player from Argentina.

== Biography ==
Contín, who reached a career-high singles ranking of 236 in the world, competed mostly on the ITF Circuit, winning eight singles titles. She also has a career win over Justine Henin, whom she beat at an ITF tournament in Spartanburg in 1998.

Her career included a Fed Cup appearance for Argentina in 1998, a World Group II Play-off tie against Australia in Canberra. She played in the second singles rubber, which she lost to Nicole Pratt.

On the WTA Tour, Contín's best performance came when she won her way through to the round of 16 at the 1999 Copa Colsanitas in Bogota, having made the main draw as a qualifier.

== ITF finals ==
=== Singles (8–7) ===
$25,000 tournaments
$10,000 tournaments

Result	No.	Date	Tournament	Surface	Opponent	Score
Win	1.	8 October 1995	Lima, Peru	Hard	(Sweden) Maria-Farnes Capistrano	6–4, 6–3
Loss	1.	5 November 1995	Santiago, Chile	Clay	(Brazil) Miriam D'Agostini	2–6, 1–6
Win	2.	18 August 1996	Guayaquil, Ecuador	Clay	(United States) Kristine Kurth	6–3, 6–2
Loss	2.	8 September 1996	Santiago, Chile	Clay	(Argentina) Luciana Masante	4–6, 6–2, 2–6
Win	3.	15 September 1996	Buenos Aires, Argentina	Clay	(Argentina) Veronica Stele	7–5, 7–6
Loss	3.	3 November 1996	Minas Gerais, Brazil	Clay	(Canada) Martina Nejedly	6–7^{(2)}, 2–6
Win	4.	11 November 1996	São Paulo, Brazil	Clay	(Czech Republic) Zdeňka Málková	6–3, 6–4
Loss	4.	7 April 1997	Viña del Mar, Chile	Clay	(Hungary) Katalin Marosi	1–6, 4–6
Loss	5.	12 October 1997	Montevideo, Uruguay	Clay	(Argentina) Clarisa Fernández	6–7, 4–6
Win	5.	12 April 1998	Viña del Mar, Chile	Clay	(Chile) Paula Cabezas	6–2, 6–4
Loss	6.	5 September 1999	San Juan, Argentina	Clay	(Argentina) Romina Ottoboni	1–6, 6–4, 4–6
Loss	7.	19 August 2002	Asunción, Paraguay	Clay	(Brazil) Maria Fernanda Alves	1–6, 1–6
Win	6.	1 September 2002	Santiago, Chile	Clay	(Brazil) Bruna Colósio	6–3, 3–6, 6–2
Win	7.	29 September 2002	San Salvador, El Salvador	Clay	(United States) Jacquelyn Rosen	4–6, 6–4, 6–2
Win	8.	6 October 2002	Mexicali, Mexico	Hard	(Uruguay) Ana Lucía Migliarini de León	4–6, 6–3, 6–4

=== Doubles (11–9) ===
Result	No.	Date	Tournament	Surface	Partner	Opponents	Score
Win	1.	8 September 1996	Santiago, Chile	Clay	(Argentina) Romina Ottoboni	(Brazil) Renata Brito (Argentina) Luciana Masante	6–2, 6–7, 6–3
Win	2.	15 September 1996	Buenos Aires, Argentina	Clay	(Argentina) Romina Ottoboni	(Brazil) Renata Brito (Peru) María Eugenia Rojas	6–4, 4–6, 7–6
Win	3.	22 September 1996	Asunción, Paraguay	Clay	(Argentina) Romina Ottoboni	(Argentina) Mariana Faustinelli (Argentina) Geraldine Aizenberg	6–2, 4–6, 6–0
Win	4.	3 November 1996	Minas Gerais, Brazil	Clay	(Argentina) Romina Ottoboni	(Canada) Martina Nejedly (Brazil) Lilian Silva	4–6, 6–4, 6–2
Loss	1.	7 April 1997	Viña del Mar, Chile	Clay	(Argentina) Luciana Masante	(Hungary) Katalin Marosi (Argentina) Veronica Stele	1–6, 7–5, 2–6
Loss	2.	4 May 1997	Balaguer, Spain	Clay	(Spain) Conchita Martínez Granados	(Spain) Nuria Montero (Spain) Lourdes Domínguez Lino	6–0, 2–6, 4–6
Loss	3.	5 October 1997	Buenos Aires, Argentina	Clay	(Argentina) Romina Ottoboni	(Argentina) Laura Montalvo (Argentina) Mercedes Paz	6–4, 2–6, 4–6
Loss	4.	23 November 1997	São Paulo, Brazil	Clay	(Argentina) Cintia Tortorella	(Brazil) Vanessa Menga (Brazil) Miriam D'Agostini	1–6, 3–6
Loss	5.	6 April 1998	Viña del Mar, Chile	Clay	(Chile) Paula Cabezas	(Argentina) Melisa Arévalo (Argentina) Daniela Muscolino	3–6, 4–6
Win	5.	27 April 1998	Hatfield, United Kingdom	Clay	(Spain) Mariam Ramón Climent	(United Kingdom) Lizzie Jelfs (United Kingdom) Amanda Keen	3–6, 6–3, 6–4
Loss	6.	12 September 1998	Mexico City, Mexico	Hard	(Mexico) Jessica Fernández	(Netherlands) Seda Noorlander (Greece) Christína Papadáki	3–6, 1–6
Win	6.	28 November 1999	Rio de Janeiro, Brazil	Clay	(Brazil) Joana Cortez	(Brazil) Miriam D'Agostini (Brazil) Carla Tiene	6–1, 3–6, 6–3
Win	7.	1 April 2001	Santiago, Chile	Clay	(Argentina) Romina Ottoboni	(Brazil) Marcela Evangelista (Brazil) Letícia Sobral	6–1, 6–3
Win	8.	6 April 2002	Belo Horizonte, Brazil	Hard	(Argentina) Romina Ottoboni	(Brazil) Vanessa Menga (Brazil) Maria Fernanda Alves	6–4, 2–6, 7–5
Loss	7.	3 June 2002	Poznań, Poland	Clay	(Uruguay) Ana Lucía Migliarini de León	(Netherlands) Jolanda Mens (Netherlands) Tessy van de Ven	2–6, 2–6
Win	9.	1 September 2002	Santiago, Chile	Clay	(Brazil) Bruna Colósio	(Brazil) Larissa Carvalho (Argentina) Soledad Esperón	w/o
Loss	8.	29 September 2002	San Salvador, El Salvador	Clay	(Argentina) Micaela Moran	(United States) Jacquelyn Rosen (Germany) Jacqueline Froehlich	w/o
Win	10.	1 October 2002	Mexicali, Mexico	Hard	(Uruguay) Ana Lucía Migliarini de León	(Brazil) Marcela Evangelista (Brazil) Letícia Sobral	6–4, 6–2
Win	11.	7 October 2002	Los Mochis, Mexico	Clay	(Uruguay) Ana Lucía Migliarini de León	(Argentina) Jorgelina Barrera (Argentina) Florencia Rivolta	7–5, 6–1
Loss	9.	14 June 2002	Pachuca, Mexico	Clay	(Uruguay) Ana Lucía Migliarini de León	(Mexico) Erika Clarke (Mexico) Graciela Vélez	0–6, 1–6

== See also ==
- List of Argentina Fed Cup team representatives
