= Mariam Ramón Climent =

Spanish tennis player (born 1976)

- Full name: Mariam Desamparados Ramón Climent
- Country (sports): Spain
- Born: 26 August 1976 (age 50)
- Turned pro: 1992
- Retired: 2004
- Plays: Right-handed (two-handed backhand)
- Prize money: $170,071

Singles
- Career record: 249–215
- Career titles: 6 ITF
- Highest ranking: No. 124 (20 September 1999)

Grand Slam singles results
- Australian Open: Q1 (1999, 2000, 2001)
- French Open: Q3 (1995)
- US Open: Q2 (1999)

Doubles
- Career record: 104–147
- Career titles: 6 ITF
- Highest ranking: No. 120 (3 May 1999)

Grand Slam doubles results
- Australian Open: 1R (1999)
- French Open: 1R (1999)

Mariam Desamparados Ramón Climent (born 26 August 1976) is a retired Spanish female tennis player.

Ramón Climent won six singles and six doubles titles on the ITF Women's Circuit during her career. On 20 September 1999, she reached her highest singles ranking of world No. 124. On 3 May 1999, she peaked at No. 120 in the doubles rankings.

She also played in the 1999 Australian Open and French Open doubles events, and lost in the first round of each.

Ramon Climent retired from pro tennis in 2004.

== ITF Circuit finals ==
$100,000 tournaments
$75,000 tournaments
$50,000 tournaments
$25,000 tournaments
$10,000 tournaments

=== Singles: 10 (6–4) ===
Result	No.	Date	Tournament	Surface	Opponent	Score
Loss	1.	10 May 1993	Barcelona, Spain	Clay	(Spain) Ángeles Montolio	6–7^{(3–7)}, 4–6
Loss	2.	7 February 1994	Faro, Portugal	Hard	(Spain) Cristina Torrens Valero	3–6, 4–6
Win	3.	9 May 1994	Mollet, Spain	Clay	(France) Nathalie Dechy	6–0, 6–0
Loss	4.	2 October 1995	Lerida, Spain	Clay	(Austria) Sandra Dopfer	1–6, 1–6
Win	5.	20 April 1998	Espinho, Portugal	Clay	(Spain) Alicia Ortuño	6–0, 6–2
Win	6.	27 April 1998	Hatfield, United Kingdom	Clay	(United Kingdom) Lizzie Jelfs	6–1, 1–6, 6–3
Win	7.	28 September 1998	Lerida, Spain	Clay	(Ukraine) Julia Vakulenko	6–1, 6–3
Win	8.	23 November 1998	Lima, Peru	Clay	(Slovakia) Janette Husárová	6–1, 4–1 ret.
Loss	9.	26 April 1999	Espinho, Portugal	Clay	(Austria) Evelyn Fauth	3–6, 6–4, 5–7
Win	10.	19 June 2000	Gorizia, Italy	Clay	(Madagascar) Dally Randriantefy	6–2, 6–1

=== Doubles: 14 (6–8) ===
Result	No.	Date	Tournament	Surface	Partner	Opponents	Score
Loss	1.	27 June 1994	Cáceres, Spain	Hard	(Spain) María Sánchez Lorenzo	(Spain) Gala León García (Spain) Janet Souto	6–4, 2–6, 1–6
Win	2.	27 April 1998	Hatfield, United Kingdom	Clay	(Argentina) Celeste Contín	(United Kingdom) Lizzie Jelfs (United Kingdom) Amanda Keen	3–6, 6–3, 6–4
Win	3.	1 June 1998	Bytom, Poland	Clay	(Spain) Rosa María Andrés Rodríguez	(Slovakia) Ľudmila Cervanová (Slovakia) Janette Husárová	6–3, 6–3
Win	4.	28 September 1998	Lerida, Spain	Clay	(Spain) Patricia Aznar	(Denmark) Charlotte Aagaard (Denmark) Maria Rasmussen	6–2, 6–0
Loss	5.	15 March 1999	Dinan, France	Clay (i)	(Spain) Rosa María Andrés Rodríguez	(Slovakia) Janette Husárová (Hungary) Rita Kuti-Kis	4–6, 2–6
Loss	6.	24 May 1999	Budapest, Hungary	Clay	(Spain) Eva Bes	(Italy) Alice Canepa (Belarus) Tatiana Poutchek	3–6, 0–6
Win	7.	14 June 1999	Gorizia, Italy	Clay	(Spain) Gisela Riera	(Germany) Marketa Kochta (Argentina) Erica Krauth	7–5, 6–3
Loss	8.	30 August 1999	Denain, France	Clay	(Argentina) Luciana Masante	(Spain) Rosa María Andrés Rodríguez (Spain) Conchita Martínez Granados	1–6, 4–6
Loss	9.	2 October 2000	Girona, Spain	Clay	(Spain) Gisela Riera	(Spain) Eva Bes (Spain) Lourdes Domínguez Lino	2–4, 2–4
Loss	10.	21 August 2001	Maribor, Slovenia	Clay	(Serbia and Montenegro) Katarina Mišić	(Czech Republic) Olga Vymetálková (Czech Republic) Gabriela Chmelinová	2–6, 2–6
Win	11.	17 September 2001	Lecce, Italy	Clay	(Germany) Angelika Rösch	(Romania) Andreea Ehritt-Vanc (Italy) Maria Paola Zavagli	7–6^{(6)}, 7–6^{(6)}
Win	12.	4 February 2002	Mallorca, Spain	Clay	(Spain) Rosa María Andrés Rodríguez	(Austria) Jennifer Schmidt (Sweden) Maria Wolfbrandt	6–2, 6–3
Loss	13.	2 March 2003	Las Palmas, Spain	Clay	(Spain) Lourdes Domínguez Lino	(Spain) María José Sánchez Alayeto (Spain) Marta Fraga	6–2, 5–7, 3–6
Loss	14.	17 March 2003	Castellón, Spain	Clay	(Spain) Rosa María Andrés Rodríguez	(Slovakia) Ľudmila Cervanová (Slovakia) Stanislava Hrozenská	6–4, 3–6, 0–6

Sporting positions
Preceded by (Spain) Ángeles Montolio	Orange Bowl Girls' Singles Champion; Category: 18 and under 1994	Succeeded by (Russia) Anna Kournikova
