= Ľudmila Cervanová =

Slovak tennis player

- Country (sports): Slovakia
- Residence: Piešťany
- Born: 15 October 1979 (age 45); Piešťany, Czechoslovakia
- Turned pro: 1997
- Retired: 2010
- Plays: Right-handed
- Prize money: $660,547

Singles
- Career record: 289–236
- Career titles: 7 ITF
- Highest ranking: No. 58 (1 March 2004)

Grand Slam singles results
- Australian Open: 2R (2003, 2004)
- French Open: 3R (2002)
- Wimbledon: 3R (2004)
- US Open: 2R (2003)

Doubles
- Career record: 90–85
- Career titles: 7 ITF
- Highest ranking: No. 186 (5 May 1997)

Grand Slam doubles results
- French Open: 1R (2005)
- Wimbledon: 1R (2005)

Ľudmila Cervanová (Slovak pronunciation: [ˈʎudmila ˈtserʋanɔʋaː]; born 15 October 1979) is a former tennis player from Slovakia. She turned professional in 1997, and reached career-high rankings of world No. 58 in singles in March 2004 and No. 186 in doubles in May 1997.

== Biography ==
Cervanová graduated from high school in 1997, the same year she turned pro. Her favourite tennis court surface is clay, and her best shot is the backhand. She was coached by Jan Kuval.

== Tennis career ==
Cervanová did not win any title on the WTA Tour. Her closest being in Acapulco, on 27 February 2005, when she lost in the final to Flavia Pennetta in three sets. She has also reached the final of the tournament in Casablanca in 2004, where she lost to Émilie Loit of France, the semifinals of Bratislava in 2001, where she lost to eventual winner Rita Grande from Italy and the semifinals of Bogotá in 2006, losing to Lourdes Domínguez Lino in straight sets.

In her career, she won seven singles and seven doubles titles on the ITF Women's Circuit.

Cervanová has made respectable progress in each of the four Grand Slam tournaments, her best reaching the third round of Wimbledon in 2004, and the third round of the French Open in 2002.

== WTA Tour finals ==
=== Singles: 2 (runner-ups) ===
Legend
Tier I (0–0)
Tier II (0–0)
Tier III (0–1)
Tier IV & V (0–1)

Result	No.	Date	Tournament	Surface	Opponent	Score
Loss	1.	Apr 2004	Casablanca, Morocco	Clay	(France) Émilie Loit	2–6, 2–6
Loss	2.	Feb 2005	Acapulco, Mexico	Clay	(Italy) Flavia Pennetta	6–3, 5–7, 3–6

== ITF finals ==
$100,000 tournaments
$75,000 tournaments
$50,000 tournaments
$25,000 tournaments
$10,000 tournaments

=== Singles (7–4) ===
Result	No.	Date	Tournament	Surface	Opponent	Score
Win	1.	21 September 1997	Biograd, Croatia	Clay	(Slovenia) Katarina Srebotnik	6–4, 6–2
Loss	1.	10 November 1997	Rio de Janeiro, Brazil	Clay	(Slovakia) Zuzana Váleková	3–6, 6–4, 1–6
Loss	2.	23 November 1997	São Paulo, Brazil	Hard	(United States) Aurandrea Narvaez	4–6, 7–5, 3–6
Win	2.	30 November 1997	Campinas, Brazil	Hard	(United States) Ingrid Kurta	6–0, 6–0
Win	3.	4 May 1998	Prešov, Slovakia	Clay	(Slovakia) Stanislava Hrozenská	6–2, 6–0
Win	4.	17 May 1998	Nitra, Slovakia	Clay	(Hungary) Rita Kuti-Kis	5–7, 6–4, 7–6
Win	5.	7 June 1998	Bytom, Poland	Clay	(France) Sophie Georges	6–3, 6–0
Win	6.	29 June 1998	Stuttgart, Germany	Clay	(Germany) Sandra Klösel	6–2, 7–5
Loss	3.	6 September 1998	Spoleto, Italy	Clay	(Hungary) Rita Kuti-Kis	1–6, 2–6
Win	7.	15 October 2000	Poitiers, France	Hard (i)	(Croatia) Iva Majoli	4–6, 6–3, 6–2
Loss	4.	23 March 2003	Castellón, Spain	Clay	(Croatia) Karolina Šprem	3–6, 3–6

=== Doubles (7–9) ===
Result	No.	Date	Tournament	Surface	Partner	Opponents	Score
Loss	1.	13 May 1996	Prešov, Slovakia	Clay	(Slovakia) Martina Nedelková	(Czech Republic) Monika Maštalířová (Bulgaria) Teodora Nedeva	4–6, 3–6
Win	1.	23 June 1996	Staré Splavy, Czech Republic	Clay	(Slovakia) Michaela Hasanová	(Czech Republic) Nikola Hübnerová (Czech Republic) Michaela Paštiková	6–7, 7–6, 7–5
Loss	2.	25 August 1996	Valašské Meziříčí, Czech Republic	Clay	(Slovakia) Zuzana Váleková	(Czech Republic) Gabriela Chmelinová (Czech Republic) Sabine Radevicová	7–6, 3–6, 3–6
Win	2.	15 September 1996	Zadar, Croatia	Clay	(Slovakia) Zuzana Váleková	(Czech Republic) Blanka Kumbárová (Czech Republic) Petra Plačková	6–3, 6–4
Loss	3.	22 September 1996	Biograd, Croatia	Clay	(Slovakia) Zuzana Váleková	(Slovakia) Michaela Hasanová (Slovakia) Martina Nedelková	6–2, 4–6, 5–7
Loss	4.	17 November 1996	São Paulo, Brazil	Clay	(Slovakia) Zuzana Váleková	(Zimbabwe) Cara Black (Kazakhstan) Irina Selyutina	6–4, 4–6, 3–6
Win	3.	23 June 1997	Plzeň, Czech Republic	Clay	(Slovakia) Zuzana Váleková	(Czech Republic) Petra Kučová (Czech Republic) Eva Krejčová	5–7, 6–1, 6–2
Loss	5.	19 October 1997	Nicosia, Cyprus	Clay	(Czech Republic) Eva Krejčová	(Italy) Katia Altilia (Denmark) Charlotte Aagaard	4–6, 5–7
Loss	6.	23 March 1998	Makarska, Croatia	Clay	(Slovakia) Zuzana Váleková	(Croatia) Jelena Kostanić Tošić (Slovenia) Katarina Srebotnik	3–6, 1–6
Loss	7.	7 June 1998	Bytom, Poland	Clay	(Slovakia) Janette Husárová	(Spain) Rosa María Andrés Rodríguez (Spain) Mariam Ramón Climent	3–6, 3–6
Loss	8.	28 September 1998	Thessaloniki, Greece	Clay	(Germany) Magdalena Kučerová	(Greece) Eleni Daniilidou (Greece) Christína Papadáki	6–7^{(5–7)}, 6–4, 5–7
Loss	9.	20 December 1998	Průhonice, Czech Republic	Carpet (i)	(Germany) Magdalena Kučerová	(Czech Republic) Eva Melicharová (Czech Republic) Helena Vildová	6–4, 3–6, 4–6
Win	4.	19 September 1999	Otočec, Slovenia	Clay	(Slovakia) Andrea Šebová	(Germany) Syna Schmidle (Austria) Melanie Schnell	6–3, 6–4
Win	5.	29 July 2002	Saint-Gaudens, France	Clay	(Slovakia) Stanislava Hrozenská	(Australia) Sarah Stone (Australia) Samantha Stosur	7–6^{(7–5)}, 6–4
Win	6.	17 March 2003	Castellón, Spain	Clay	(Slovakia) Stanislava Hrozenská	(Spain) Rosa María Andrés Rodríguez (Spain) Mariam Ramón Climent	4–6, 6–3, 6–0
Win	7.	4 August 2008	Vienna, Austria	Clay	(Slovakia) Katarína Maráčková	(Austria) Nikola Hofmanova (Romania) Laura Ioana Andrei	0–6, 6–3, [13–11]
