= Romina Ottoboni =

Argentine tennis player

- Country (sports): Argentina
- Born: 19 June 1978 (age 48)
- Prize money: $43,750

Singles
- Career record: 124–76
- Career titles: 5 ITF
- Highest ranking: No. 286 (17 August 1998)

Doubles
- Career record: 119–63
- Career titles: 14 ITF
- Highest ranking: No. 157 (8 September 1997)

Romina Ottoboni (born 19 June 1978) is an Argentinian former professional tennis player.

Ottoboni reached a best singles ranking of 286 and won five ITF Circuit titles. As a doubles player she was more successful, with 14 titles on the ITF Circuit and the highest world ranking of 157.

On the WTA Tour, Ottoboni was a three-time doubles quarterfinalist and made her only singles main-draw appearance at the Copa Colsanitas in Bogotá, as a qualifier. She defeated the second seed in qualifying, Jelena Dokic, before being eliminated in the first round of the main draw by Gisela Riera.

Ottoboni most recently played in a professional match in March 2003, losing in the first round of an ITF doubles tournament in Rabat, Morocco. She played her final singles match a year prior, in April 2002, in Belo Horizonte, Brazil where she lost in the first round of the main draw as a qualifier.

== ITF Circuit finals ==
$25,000 tournaments
$10,000 tournaments

=== Singles: 7 (5 titles, 2 runner-ups) ===
| Result | No. | Date | Tournament | Surface | Opponent | Score |
|---|---|---|---|---|---|---|
| Loss | 1. | 7 September 1997 | ITF Lima, Peru | Clay | (Brazil) Miriam D'Agostini | 3–6, 0–6 |
| Loss | 2. | 19 April 1998 | ITF Galatina, Italy | Clay | (Spain) Noelia Serra | 2–6, 6–4, 2–6 |
| Win | 1. | 26 April 1998 | ITF Bari, Italy | Clay | (Spain) Rosa María Andrés Rodríguez | 2–6, 6–2, 7–5 |
| Win | 2. | 9 August 1998 | ITF Catania, Italy | Clay | (Argentina) Bettina Fulco | 6–4, 7–6^{(2)} |
| Win | 3. | 5 September 1999 | ITF San Juan, Argentina | Clay | (Argentina) Celeste Contín | 6–1, 4–6, 6–4 |
| Win | 4. | 3 September 2000 | ITF Buenos Aires, Argentina | Clay | (Argentina) Mariana Mesa | 7–6^{(3)}, 6–2 |
| Loss | 3. | 10 September 2000 | ITF Buenos Aires | Clay | (Argentina) Natalia Gussoni | 7–5, 1–6 |
| Win | 5. | 17 September 2000 | ITF Buenos Aires | Clay | (Argentina) Natalia Gussoni | 6–3, 6–0 |

=== Doubles: 17 (14 titles, 3 runner-ups) ===
| Result | No. | Date | Tournament | Surface | Partner | Opponents | Score |
|---|---|---|---|---|---|---|---|
| Win | 1. | 8 September 1996 | ITF Santiago, Chile | Clay | (Argentina) Celeste Contín | (Brazil) Renata Brito (Argentina) Luciana Masante | 6–2, 6–7, 6–3 |
| Win | 2. | 15 September 1996 | ITF Buenos Aires, Argentina | Clay | (Argentina) Celeste Contín | (Brazil) Renata Brito (Peru) María Eugenia Rojas | 6–4, 4–6, 7–6 |
| Win | 3. | 22 September 1996 | ITF Asunción, Paraguay | Clay | (Argentina) Celeste Contín | (Argentina) Mariana Faustinelli (Argentina) Geraldine Aizenberg | 6–2, 4–6, 6–0 |
| Win | 4. | 6 October 1996 | ITF Bogotá, Colombia | Clay | (Colombia) Giana Gutiérrez | (United Kingdom) Joanne Moore (Colombia) Carmiña Giraldo | 1–6, 6–3, 6–1 |
| Win | 5. | 3 November 1996 | ITF Minas Gerais, Brazil | Clay | (Argentina) Celeste Contín | (Canada) Martina Nejedly (Brazil) Lilian Silva | 4–6, 6–4, 6–2 |
| Loss | 1. | 31 August 1997 | ITF Guayaquil, Ecuador | Clay | (Argentina) Mariana Lopez Palacios | (Chile) Paula Cabezas (Brazil) Miriam D'Agostini | 1–6, 4–6 |
| Win | 6. | 7 September 1997 | ITF Lima, Peru | Clay | (Argentina) Paula Racedo | (Peru) María Eugenia Rojas (Israel) Jacquelyn Rosen | 6–0, 6–4 |
| Loss | 2. | 5 October 1997 | ITF Buenos Aires, Argentina | Clay | (Argentina) Celeste Contín | (Argentina) Laura Montalvo (Argentina) Mercedes Paz | 6–4, 2–6, 4–6 |
| Win | 7. | 3 May 1998 | ITF San Severo, Italy | Clay | (Brazil) Eugenia Maia | (Colombia) Giana Gutiérrez (Argentina) Veronica Stele | 1–6, 7–5, 7–5 |
| Win | 8. | 11 May 1998 | ITF Le Touquet, France | Clay | (France) Vanina Casanova | (Tunisia) Selima Sfar (France) Élodie Le Bescond | 7–6, 1–0 ret. |
| Loss | 3. | 4 July 1999 | ITF Mont-de-Marsan, France | Clay | (Colombia) Giana Gutiérrez | (Argentina) María Fernanda Landa (Spain) Eva Bes | 4–6, 4–6 |
| Win | 9. | 30 August 1999 | ITF San Juan, Argentina | Clay | (Brazil) Eugenia Maia | (Uruguay) Virginia Sadi (Uruguay) Daniela Olivera | 6–2, 6–2 |
| Win | 10. | 23 April 2000 | ITF San Luis Potosí, Mexico | Clay | (Argentina) María Fernanda Landa | (United Kingdom) Helen Crook (United Kingdom) Victoria Davies | 6–4, 7–6^{(7)} |
| Win | 11. | 4 September 2000 | ITF Buenos Aires, Argentina | Clay | (Colombia) Mariana Mesa | (Argentina) Sabrina Valenti (Argentina) Natalia Gussoni | 1–6, 6–4, 6–3 |
| Win | 12. | 7 January 2001 | ITF São Paulo, Brazil | Hard | (Argentina) Clarisa Fernández | (Brazil) Miriam D'Agostini (Brazil) Vanessa Menga | 6–1, 7–6^{(6)} |
| Win | 13. | 1 April 2001 | ITF Santiago, Chile | Clay | (Argentina) Celeste Contín | (Brazil) Marcela Evangelista (Brazil) Letícia Sobral | 6–1, 6–3 |
| Win | 14. | 14 April 2002 | ITF Belo Horizonte, Brazil | Hard | (Argentina) Celeste Contín | (Brazil) Vanessa Menga (Brazil) Maria Fernanda Alves | 6–4, 2–6, 7–5 |
