= Gisela Riera =

Spanish tennis player (born 1976)

- Full name: Gisela Riera Roura
- Country (sports): Spain
- Born: 7 May 1976 (age 49); Barcelona, Spain
- Height: 1.76 m (5 ft 9 1/2 in)
- Turned pro: 1991
- Retired: 2003
- Plays: Right (two-handed backhand)
- Prize money: $170,316

Singles
- Career record: 204–163
- Career titles: 4 ITF
- Highest ranking: No. 136 (7 June 1999)

Grand Slam singles results
- Australian Open: Q2 (2001)
- French Open: Q1 (1999, 2001)
- Wimbledon: Q2 (2000)
- US Open: Q3 (1999)

Doubles
- Career record: 124–106
- Career titles: 8 ITF
- Highest ranking: No. 71 (12 June 2000)

Grand Slam doubles results
- Australian Open: 1R (2000, 2001)
- French Open: 2R (2000)
- Wimbledon: 1R (2000)
- US Open: 1R (1999, 2000, 2001)

Grand Slam mixed doubles results
- Wimbledon: 3R (2000)

Gisela Riera Roura (born 7 May 1976) is a retired Spanish tennis player.

During her career, Riera won four singles and eight doubles titles ITF Women's Circuit. On 7 June 1999, she reached a singles ranking high of world No. 136. On 12 June 2000, she peaked at No. 71 in the WTA doubles rankings.

Riera retired from professional tour 2003.

== Personal ==
Born in Barcelona, Riera started playing tennis at age eight. She prefers clay over hard courts. Her father's name is Jose Maria; mother's name is Angel; has four older siblings: Jose Maria, Carina, Leo and Rafael.

== WTA Tour finals ==
=== Doubles: 1 (runner-up) ===
Legend
Grand Slam tournaments
Premier M & Premier 5
Premier
International (0–1)

Result	Date	Tournament	Surface	Partner	Opponents	Score
Loss	Jun 1999	Tashkent, Uzbekistan	Hard	(Spain) Eva Bes	(Russia) Evgenia Kulikovskaya (Austria) Patricia Wartusch	6–7^{(3)}, 0–6

== ITF finals ==
=== Singles (4–4) ===
Legend $25,000 tournaments $10,000 tournaments	Finals by surface Hard (1–0) Clay (3–4)

Result	Date	Tournament	Surface	Opponent	Score
Loss	4 April 1994	Murcia, Spain	Clay	(Spain) Ana Alcázar	3–6, 3–6
Loss	8 July 1996	Vigo, Spain	Clay	(Hungary) Katalin Marosi	1–6, 2–6
Win	9 February 1998	Mallorca, Spain	Clay	(Spain) Rosa María Andrés Rodríguez	6–4, 6–3
Win	1 June 1998	Ceuta, Spain	Hard	(Morocco) Bahia Mouhtassine	7–5, 2–6, 6–2
Win	12 July 1998	Puchheim, Germany	Clay	(Bulgaria) Lubomira Bacheva	6–4, 6–4
Loss	21 September 1998	Tucumán, Argentina	Clay	(Paraguay) Larissa Schaerer	4–6, 2–6
Loss	1 February 1999	Mallorca, Spain	Clay	(Spain) Ángeles Montolio	0–6, 3–6
Win	12 June 2000	Grado, Italy	Clay	(Italy) Flora Perfetti	6–2, 6–4

=== Doubles (8–12) ===
$75,000 tournaments
$50,000 tournaments
$25,000 tournaments
$10,000 tournaments

Result	Date	Tournament	Surface	Partner	Opponents	Score
Loss	27 May 1996	Barcelona, Spain	Clay	(Austria) Désirée Leupold	(Spain) Marta Cano (Spain) Nuria Montero	5–7, 6–3, 1–6
Loss	7 July 1997	Vigo, Spain	Clay	(Spain) Conchita Martínez Granados	(Spain) Lourdes Domínguez Lino (Spain) Nuria Montero	3–6, 0–6
Win	6 October 1997	Gerona, Spain	Clay	(Spain) Conchita Martínez Granados	(Spain) Lourdes Domínguez Lino (Spain) Nuria Montero	2–6, 6–3, 6–4
Loss	3 November 1997	Suzano, Brazil	Clay	(Spain) Conchita Martínez Granados	(Paraguay) Laura Bernal (Paraguay) Larissa Schaerer	6–3, 3–6, 6–7^{(4)}
Win	18 May 1998	Zaragoza, Spain	Clay	(Switzerland) Aliénor Tricerri	(Spain) Lourdes Domínguez Lino (Argentina) Veronica Stele	6–4, 6–1
Win	1 June 1998	Ceuta, Spain	Hard	(Switzerland) Aliénor Tricerri	(Spain) Tamara Aranda (Spain) Julia Carballal	6–3, 6–3
Win	20 July 1998	Valladolid, Spain	Hard	(Tunisia) Selima Sfar	(Spain) Rosa María Andrés Rodríguez (Spain) Eva Bes	7–6^{(5)}, 7–6^{(3)}
Loss	15 March 1999	Reims, France	Clay (i)	(Italy) Antonella Serra Zanetti	(Slovakia) Janette Husárová (Hungary) Rita Kuti-Kis	2–6, 3–6
Win	20 June 1999	Marseille, France	Clay	(Romania) Raluca Sandu	(Czech Republic) Eva Martincová (Czech Republic) Lenka Němečková	6–4, 7–6^{(8)}
Win	14 June 1999	Gorizia, Italy	Clay	(Spain) Mariam Ramon Climent	(Germany) Marketa Kochta (Argentina) Erica Krauth	7–5, 6–3
Loss	12 July 1999	Getxo, Spain	Clay	(Spain) Alicia Ortuño	(Spain) Conchita Martínez Granados (Spain) Rosa María Andrés Rodríguez	6–7^{(4)}, 4–6
Loss	1 August 1999	Bytom, Poland	Clay	(Romania) Raluca Sandu	(Spain) Eva Bes (Poland) Magdalena Grzybowska	4–6, 5–7
Win	20 March 2000	Taranto, Italy	Clay	(Spain) Eva Bes	(Germany) Stéphanie Foretz (Italy) Antonella Serra Zanetti	6–7^{(2)}, 6–2, 6–2
Win	15 May 2000	Porto, Portugal	Clay	(Spain) Eva Bes	(Spain) Conchita Martínez Granados (Spain) Rosa María Andrés Rodríguez	6–3, 6–3
Loss	24 July 2000	Liège, Belgium	Clay	(Spain) Eva Bes	(Hungary) Virág Csurgó (Hungary) Petra Mandula	6–7^{(3)}, 1–6
Loss	2 October 2000	Girona, Spain	Clay	(Spain) Mariam Ramon Climent	(Spain) Eva Bes (Spain) Lourdes Domínguez Lino	2–4, 2–4
Loss	23 April 2001	Caserta, Italy	Clay	(Spain) María José Martínez Sánchez	(Spain) Eva Bes (Spain) Lourdes Domínguez Lino	1–6, 6–7^{(5)}
Loss	30 July 2001	Saint-Gaudens, France	Clay	(Spain) Lourdes Domínguez Lino	(France) Sarah Pitkowski-Malcor (Kazakhstan) Irina Selyutina	2–6, 3–6
Loss	3 September 2001	Fano, Italy	Clay	(Spain) Eva Bes	(Italy) Giulia Casoni (Hungary) Katalin Marosi	3–6, 4–6
Loss	10 September 2001	Fano, Italy	Clay	(Argentina) Eugenia Chialvo	(Estonia) Maret Ani (Italy) Gloria Pizzichini	w/o

== Grand Slam doubles performance timeline ==
Key
W	F	SF	QF	#R	RR	Q#	DNQ	A	NH

(W) winner; (F) finalist; (SF) semifinalist; (QF) quarterfinalist; (#R) rounds 4, 3, 2, 1; (RR) round-robin stage; (Q#) qualification round; (DNQ) did not qualify; (A) absent; (NH) not held; (SR) strike rate (events won / competed); (W–L) win–loss record.

Tournament	1999	2000	2001	W-L
Australian Open	A	1R	1R	0–2
French Open	A	2R	A	1–1
Wimbledon	A	1R	A	0–1
US Open	1R	1R	1R	0–3
Win–loss	0–1	1–4	0–2	1–7
