= Vanessa Menga =

Brazilian tennis player

- Country (sports): Brazil
- Residence: São Paulo
- Born: 10 October 1976 (age 49) São Paulo
- Height: 1.71 m (5 ft 7 in)
- Turned pro: 1995
- Retired: 2003
- Plays: Right-handed (two-handed backhand)
- Prize money: $139,973

Singles
- Career record: 185–186
- Career titles: 3 ITF
- Highest ranking: No. 163 (22 February 1999)

Doubles
- Career record: 267–148
- Career titles: 33 ITF
- Highest ranking: No. 93 (7 June 1999)

Grand Slam doubles results
- French Open: 3R (1999)
- Wimbledon: 1R (1999)
- US Open: 1R (1999)

Grand Slam mixed doubles results
- Wimbledon: 2R (1999)

Vanessa Menga
Medal record

Women's Tennis

Representing Brazil

Pan American Games
Gold medal – first place	1999 Winnipeg	Women's Doubles

Vanessa Menga (born 10 October 1976) is a Brazilian former professional tennis player.

Born in São Paulo, she started playing tennis at the age of 4, when she went to an academy along with her father. At the age of 14, Menga went to train tennis in Barcelona, where she won her first doubles championship.

She's the only Brazilian female tennis player to play in two Summer Olympic Games, Atlanta 1996 (doubles with Miriam D’Agostini, falling in round 1), and Sydney 2000 (with Joana Cortez, falling in round 2). Menga was also in two Pan American Games, Mar Del Plata 1995 and Winnipeg 1999, where she won the doubles gold medal with Joana Cortez.

In 2001, Menga posed for Playboy Brazil. In 2003, she retired from tennis after a motorcycle accident which left her for eight months without playing. Menga now has an institute in São Paulo where she teaches tennis to over 200 children, and participates in other charity projects.

== ITF finals ==
=== Singles: 9 (3–6) ===
Legend
$100,000 tournaments
$75,000 tournaments
$40,000 tournaments
$50,000 tournaments
$25,000 tournaments
$10,000 tournaments

Result	No.	Date	Tournament	Surface	Opponent	Score
Loss	1.	8 July 1996	ITF São Paulo, Brazil	Clay	(Dominican Republic) Joelle Schad	1–6, 1–6
Loss	2.	27 October 1996	ITF Rio Grande do Sul, Brazil	Hard	(Brazil) Andrea Vieira	0–6, 2–6
Win	3.	14 September 1997	ITF La Paz, Bolivia	Clay	(Argentina) Laura Montalvo	6–3, 7–5
Loss	4.	20 October 1997	ITF Novo Hamburgo, Brazil	Clay	(Argentina) Laura Montalvo	3–6, 0–6
Win	5.	11 May 1998	ITF Poza Rica, Mexico	Hard	(Russia) Alina Jidkova	6–2, 6–7, 6–1
Win	6.	6 September 1998	ITF Manaus, Brazil	Hard	(Croatia) Dora Krstulović	1–6, 6–1, 6–2
Loss	7.	22 November 1998	ITF Caracas, Venezuela	Hard	(Canada) Maureen Drake	1–6, 2–6
Loss	8.	30 November 1998	ITF Guadalajara, Mexico	Clay	(Hungary) Katalin Marosi	5–7, 3–6
Loss	9.	22 July 2001	ITF São José dos Campos, Brazil	Hard	(Netherlands) Seda Noorlander	1–6, 3–6

=== Doubles: 54 (33–21) ===
Result	No.	Date	Tournament	Surface	Partner	Opponents	Score
Win	1.	3 May 1993	ITF Balaguer, Spain	Clay	(Australia) Melissa Beadman	(Spain) Yolanda Clemot (Spain) Ángeles Montolio	6–2, 6–2
Loss	2.	21 March 1994	Castellón, Spain	Clay	(Argentina) Maria Inés Araiz	(Czech Republic) Ivana Havrlíková (Slovakia) Patrícia Marková	6–4, 3–6, 3–6
Win	3.	4 April 1994	Murcia, Spain	Clay	(Czech Republic) Ivana Havrlíková	(Czech Republic) Jindra Gabrisová (Czech Republic) Dominika Gorecká	6–3, 6–1
Win	4.	12 September 1994	Manizales, Colombia	Clay	(Argentina) Guadalupe Bugallo	(Ecuador) María Dolores Campana (Argentina) María Fernanda Landa	2–6, 6–4, 7–5
Loss	5.	19 September 1994	Guayaquil, Ecuador	Clay	(Brazil) Luciana Tella	(Chile) Paula Cabezas (Puerto Rico) Emilie Viqueira	4–6, 4–6
Win	6.	26 September 1994	Lima, Peru	Clay	(Brazil) Luciana Tella	(Peru) Laura Arraya (Peru) María Eugenia Rojas	6–4, 6–3
Loss	7.	30 October 1994	São Paulo, Brazil	Clay	(Brazil) Miriam D'Agostini	(Brazil) Luciana Tella (Brazil) Andrea Vieira	6–4, 3–6, 1–6
Win	8.	28 November 1994	São Paulo, Brazil	Clay	(Brazil) Luciana Tella	(Colombia) Carmiña Giraldo (Costa Rica) Paula Umaña	6–2, 6–3
Loss	9.	8 May 1995	Mollet, Spain	Clay	(Argentina) Mariana Eberle	(Spain) Marta Cano (Spain) Nuria Montero	5–7, 4–6
Loss	10.	17 July 1995	Santos, Brazil	Clay	(Argentina) Valentina Solari	(Colombia) Ximena Rodríguez (Dominican Republic) Joelle Schad	7–5, 3–6, 1–6
Win	11.	31 July 1995	Brasília, Brazil	Clay	(Brazil) Andrea Vieira	(Argentina) Geraldine Aizenberg (Dominican Republic) Joelle Schad	6–4, 6–2
Win	12.	20 November 1995	São Paulo, Brazil	Clay	(Brazil) Andrea Vieira	(Brazil) Eugenia Maia (Brazil) Luciana Tella	7–6^{(7–3)}, 6–3
Win	13.	4 December 1995	São Paulo, Brazil	Hard	(Brazil) Luciana Tella	(South Africa) Nannie de Villiers (Hungary) Katalin Marosi	6–3, 6–2
Win	14.	24 June 1996	Campo Grande, Brazil	Hard	(Brazil) Eugenia Maia	(Brazil) Cristina Ferreira (Brazil) Suzana Rodriguez	1–6, 6–3, 6–3
Loss	15.	1 July 1996	Santos, Brazil	Clay	(Dominican Republic) Joelle Schad	(Brazil) Luciana Tella (Brazil) Andrea Vieira	6–3, 1–6, 3–6
Win	16.	8 July 1996	São Paulo, Brazil	Clay	(Dominican Republic) Joelle Schad	(Brazil) Luciana Tella (Brazil) Renata Diez	6–7^{(6–8)}, 6–3, 6–2
Loss	17.	24 November 1996	São Paulo, Brazil	Clay	(Brazil) Miriam D'Agostini	(Zimbabwe) Cara Black (Kazakhstan) Irina Selyutina	6–3, 3–6, 2–6
Loss	18.	28 September 1997	San Miguel de Tucumán, Argentina	Clay	(Brazil) Miriam D'Agostini	(Zimbabwe) Cara Black (Kazakhstan) Irina Selyutina	3–6, 1–6
Loss	19.	6 October 1997	Montevideo, Uruguay	Clay	(Paraguay) Laura Bernal	(Czech Republic) Monika Maštalířová (Argentina) Paula Racedo	1–6, 6–4, 4–6
Win	20.	18 October 1997	Asunción, Paraguay	Clay	(Paraguay) Larissa Schaerer	(Czech Republic) Monika Maštalířová (Argentina) Paula Racedo	w/o
Loss	21.	20 October 1997	Novo Hamburgo, Brazil	Clay	(Brazil) Miriam D'Agostini	(Brazil) Joana Cortez (Brazil) Ana-Paula Zannoni	3–6, 7–6^{(7–4)}, 1–6
Loss	22.	2 November 1997	Mogi das Cruzes, Brazil	Clay	(Brazil) Miriam D'Agostini	(Argentina) Laura Montalvo (Argentina) Mercedes Paz	2–6, 0–6
Win	23.	23 November 1997	São Paulo, Brazil	Clay	(Brazil) Miriam D'Agostini	(Argentina) Celeste Contín (Argentina) Cintia Tortorella	6–1, 6–3
Win	24.	14 December 1997	Bogotá, Colombia	Clay	(Brazil) Miriam D'Agostini	(Brazil) Eugenia Maia (Paraguay) Larissa Schaerer	6–2, 6–2
Loss	25.	4 May 1998	Tampico, Mexico	Hard	(Chile) Paula Cabezas	(United States) Adria Engel (Russia) Alina Jidkova	6–7, 5–7
Win	26.	11 May 1998	Poza Rica, Mexico	Hard	(Chile) Paula Cabezas	(United States) Adria Engel (Russia) Alina Jidkova	3–6, 6–2, 6–2
Win	27.	18 May 1998	Coatzacoalcos, Mexico	Hard	(Chile) Paula Cabezas	(United States) Adria Engel (Russia) Alina Jidkova	6–3, 6–2
Loss	28.	6 July 1998	Vigo, Spain	Clay	(Argentina) Paula Racedo	(Spain) Lourdes Domínguez Lino (Spain) Elena Salvador	1–6, 6–4, 2–6
Win	29.	18 July 1998	Getxo, Spain	Clay	(Spain) Lourdes Domínguez Lino	(Japan) Tomoe Hotta (Slovenia) Petra Rampre	3–6, 6–4, 7–5
Win	30.	22 November 1998	Caracas, Venezuela	Hard	(Spain) Alicia Ortuño	(Canada) Maureen Drake (Germany) Caroline Schneider	6–3, 5–7, 6–3
Win	31.	12 September 1999	Mexico City, Mexico	Clay	(Brazil) Joana Cortez	(Mexico) Melody Falcó (Dominican Republic) Joelle Schad	6–4, 6–2
Win	32.	12 June 2000	Grado, Italy	Clay	(Spain) Alicia Ortuño	(Spain) Lourdes Domínguez Lino (Spain) María José Martínez Sánchez	3–6, 7–5, 6–1
Win	33.	19 June 2000	Grado, Italy	Clay	(Spain) Alicia Ortuño	(Spain) Maja Matevžič (Serbia and Montenegro) Dragana Zarić	4–6, 6–4, 6–1
Win	34.	7 August 2000	Carthage, Tunisia	Clay	(Spain) Alicia Ortuño	(Austria) Bianca Kamper (Russia) Ekaterina Kozhokina	6–2, 6–1
Win	35.	9 October 2000	Mexico City, Mexico	Hard	(Brazil) Joana Cortez	(Germany) Kirstin Freye (Republic of Ireland) Kelly Liggan	5–3, 5–4^{(6–4)}, 4–0
Loss	36.	7 January 2001	São Paulo, Brazil	Hard	(Brazil) Miriam D'Agostini	(Argentina) Clarisa Fernández (Argentina) Romina Ottoboni	1–6, 6–7^{(6–8)}
Win	37.	14 May 2001	Turin, Italy	Clay	(Argentina) Melisa Arévalo	(Argentina) Luciana Masante (Uruguay) Daniela Olivera	7–5, 6–2
Win	38.	21 May 2001	Guimarães, Portugal	Hard	(Russia) Galina Fokina	(Czech Republic) Lenka Cenková (Czech Republic) Magdalena Zděnovcová	6–2, 6–1
Win	39.	28 May 2001	Biella, Italy	Clay	(Brazil) Joana Cortez	(Austria) Daniela Klemenschits (Austria) Sandra Klemenschits	7–6^{(7–4)}, 4–6, 6–3
Win	40.	4 June 2001	Galatina, Italy	Clay	(Madagascar) Dally Randriantefy	(Morocco) Bahia Mouhtassine (Romania) Andreea Ehritt-Vanc	3–6, 6–0, 7–5
Win	41.	25 June 2001	Fontanafredda, Italy	Clay	(Brazil) Joana Cortez	(Argentina) Melisa Arévalo (Argentina) Natalia Gussoni	6–3, 6–3
Loss	42.	22 July 2001	São José dos Campos, Brazil	Hard	(Argentina) Melisa Arévalo	(Brazil) Bruna Colósio (Brazil) Carla Tiene	3–6, 5–7
Win	43.	17 September 2001	São José dos Campos, Brazil	Clay	(Uruguay) Daniela Olivera	(Brazil) Joana Cortez (Spain) Conchita Martínez Granados	4–6, 7–5, 6–3
Win	44.	23 September 2001	São Paulo, Brazil	Hard	(Brazil) Carla Tiene	(Argentina) Melisa Arévalo (Argentina) Jorgelina Cravero	6–3, 6–1
Win	45.	28 January 2002	Saltillo, Mexico	Hard	(Argentina) Melisa Arévalo	(Germany) Caroline-Ann Basu (Uruguay) Daniela Olivera	4–6, 6–4, 7–5
Win	46.	4 February 2002	Monterrey, Mexico	Hard	(Argentina) Melisa Arévalo	(Brazil) Maria Fernanda Alves (Russia) Olga Kalyuzhnaya	6–2, 6–1
Loss	47.	10 February 2002	Matamoros, Mexico	Hard	(Argentina) Melisa Arévalo	(Argentina) Jorgelina Cravero (Brazil) Carla Tiene	2–6, 6–2, 5–7
Loss	48.	17 February 2002	Ciudad Victoria, Mexico	Hard	(Argentina) Melisa Arévalo	(Argentina) Jorgelina Cravero (Brazil) Carla Tiene	2–6, 5–7
Loss	49.	31 March 2002	San Luis Potosí, Mexico	Clay	(Brazil) Carla Tiene	(Czech Republic) Dominika Luzarová (Spain) Arantxa Parra Santonja	5–7, 6–4, 3–6
Loss	50.	6 April 2002	Belo Horizonte, Brazil	Hard	(Brazil) Maria Fernanda Alves	(Argentina) Celeste Contín (Argentina) Romina Ottoboni	4–6, 6–2, 5–7
Win	51.	9 June 2002	Caserta, Italy	Clay	(Argentina) Erica Krauth	(Croatia) Maja Palaveršić (Canada) Marie-Ève Pelletier	6–4, 6–4
Loss	52.	26 January 2003	ITF Miami, United States	Hard	(Brazil) Bruna Colósio	(United States) Beau Jones (Latvia) Anžela Žguna	4–6, 6–4, 4–6
Win	53.	31 March 2003	ITF Naples, Italy	Clay	(Austria) Stefanie Haidner	(Romania) Oana Elena Golimbioschi (Hungary) Eszter Molnár	7–6^{(8–6)}, 6–3
Loss	54.	7 November 2005	ITF São Paulo, Brazil	Hard	(Brazil) Andrea Vieira	(Brazil) Ana Clara Duarte (Brazil) Roxane Vaisemberg	6–3, 5–7, 4–6
