= Luciana Masante =

Argentine tennis player

- Country (sports): Argentina
- Born: 4 December 1978 (age 47)
- Prize money: $60,928

Singles
- Career record: 155–122
- Career titles: 6 ITF
- Highest ranking: No. 197 (2 August 1999)

Grand Slam singles results
- US Open: Q1 (1999)

Doubles
- Career record: 117–86
- Career titles: 8 ITF
- Highest ranking: No. 167 (12 July 1999)

Luciana Masante (born 4 December 1978) is an Argentine former professional tennis player.

Masante began competing on tour in 1995 and featured mostly on the ITF Circuit, during her career. Her best performance on the WTA Tour was a second round appearance at the 1999 Croatian Bol Ladies Open, where she was eliminated by eventual champion Corina Morariu, retiring hurt with a leg injury while behind a set and 0–3.

Ranked as high as 197 in singles, Masante appeared in the qualifying draw for the 1999 US Open.

On the ITF Circuit, she won six singles titles and eight doubles titles, before retiring from professional tennis in 2001.

== ITF Circuit finals ==
$40,000 tournaments
$25,000 tournaments
$10,000 tournaments

=== Singles: 9 (6–3) ===
Result	No.	Date	Tournament	Surface	Opponent	Score
Win	1.	25 August 1996	ITF Lima, Peru	Hard	(Argentina) Mariana Lopez Palacios	6–4, 6–2
Win	2.	8 September 1996	ITF Santiago, Chile	Clay	(Argentina) Celeste Contín	6–4, 2–6, 6–2
Loss	1.	31 August 1997	ITF Kyiv, Ukraine	Clay	(Russia) Olga Ivanova	0–6, 2–6
Win	3.	7 September 1997	ITF Bad Nauheim, Germany	Clay	(Germany) Isabell Quast	6–4, 6–3
Win	4.	30 August 1998	ITF Middelkerke, Belgium	Clay	(Belgium) Patty Van Acker	5–7, 6–3, 6–4
Loss	2.	23 May 1999	ITF Zaragoza, Spain	Clay	(Colombia) Mariana Mesa	6–1, 4–6, 1–6
Win	5.	27 August 2000	ITF Buenos Aires, Argentina	Clay	(Paraguay) Larissa Schaerer	6–3, 6–0
Loss	3.	8 October 2000	ITF Girona, Spain	Clay	(Spain) Lourdes Domínguez Lino	4–0, 5–4, 0–4
Win	6.	2 September 2001	ITF Spoleto, Italy	Clay	(Spain) Sonia Delgado	6–3, 6–3

=== Doubles: 20 (8–12) ===
Result	No.	Date	Tournament	Surface	Partner	Opponents	Score
Loss	1.	8 September 1996	ITF Santiago, Chile	Clay	(Brazil) Renata Brito	(Argentina) Celeste Contín (Argentina) Romina Ottoboni	2–6, 7–6, 3–6
Loss	2.	7 April 1997	ITF Viña del Mar, Chile	Clay	(Argentina) Celeste Contín	(Hungary) Katalin Marosi (Argentina) Veronica Stele	1–6, 7–5, 2–6
Loss	3.	18 May 1997	ITF Le Touquet, France	Clay	(Argentina) Veronica Stele	(United States) Nicole Arendt (France) Magalie Lamarre	2–6, 3–6
Loss	4.	25 May 1997	ITF Brixen, Italy	Clay	(Switzerland) Miroslava Vavrinec	(Germany) Caroline Schneider (Austria) Patricia Wartusch	3–6, 0–6
Win	1.	7 September 1997	ITF Bad Nauheim, Germany	Clay	(Sweden) Annica Lindstedt	(Netherlands) Debby Haak (Netherlands) Maaike Koutstaal	6–2, 6–2
Win	2.	9 August 1998	ITF Rebecq, Belgium	Clay	(Belgium) Daphne Van De Zande	(Belgium) Sofie Borgions (Belgium) Cindy Schuurmans	6–1, 6–4
Win	3.	16 August 1998	ITF Koksijde, Belgium	Clay	(Czech Republic) Monika Maštalířová	(Netherlands) Lotty Seelen (Slovakia) Katarina Valkyová	6–3, 7–5
Loss	5.	23 August 1998	ITF Brussels, Belgium	Clay	(Spain) Lourdes Domínguez Lino	(Belgium) Kim Clijsters (Belgium) Cindy Schuurmans	6–7, 5–7
Win	4.	30 August 1998	ITF Middelkerke, Belgium	Clay	(Slovakia) Patrícia Marková	(Netherlands) Bretchtje Bruls (Belgium) Cindy Schuurmans	2–6, 6–3, 6–3
Loss	6.	27 September 1998	ITF Tucuman, Argentina	Clay	(Argentina) Laura Montalvo	(Argentina) Mercedes Paz (Argentina) Patricia Tarabini	7–5, 4–6, 6–7
Loss	7.	2 November 1998	ITF Mogi das Cruzes, Brazil	Clay	(Spain) Alicia Ortuño	(Spain) Eva Bes (Argentina) María Fernanda Landa	6–4, 2–6, 2–6
Loss	8.	30 August 1999	ITF Denain, France	Clay	(Spain) Mariam Ramón Climent	(Spain) Rosa María Andrés Rodríguez (Spain) Conchita Martínez Granados	1–6, 4–6
Win	5.	27 August 2000	ITF Buenos Aires, Argentina	Clay	(Argentina) Geraldine Aizenberg	(Argentina) Melisa Arévalo (Argentina) Paula Racedo	6–2, 6–2
Win	6.	19 March 2001	ITF Matamoros, Mexico	Hard	(Uruguay) Daniela Olivera	(Austria) Bianca Kamper (Austria) Nadine Schlotterer	6–2, 6–2
Win	7.	26 March 2001	ITF Victoria, Mexico	Hard	(Uruguay) Daniela Olivera	(Argentina) Melisa Arévalo (Spain) Conchita Martínez Granados	6–4, 7–5
Loss	9.	7 May 2001	ITF Maglie, Italy	Clay	(Argentina) Natalia Gussoni	(Spain) Rosa María Andrés Rodríguez (Argentina) Eugenia Chialvo	4–6, 4–6
Loss	10.	14 May 2001	ITF Turin, Italy	Clay	(Uruguay) Daniela Olivera	(Argentina) Melisa Arévalo (Brazil) Vanessa Menga	5–7, 2–6
Win	8.	8 July 2001	ITF Getxo, Spain	Clay	(Uruguay) Daniela Olivera	(Spain) Anna Font (Russia) Raissa Gourevitch	6–2, 6–3
Loss	11.	13 August 2001	ITF Aosta, Italy	Clay	(Austria) Stefanie Haidner	(France) Kildine Chevalier (Madagascar) Natacha Randriantefy	6–1, 2–6, 2–6
Loss	12.	27 September 2001	ITF Spoleto, Italy	Clay	(Austria) Stefanie Haidner	(Italy) Silvia Disderi (Italy) Anna Floris	4–6, 5–7
