= Larissa Schaerer =

Paraguayan tennis player

- Country (sports): Paraguay
- Born: 15 April 1975 (age 50) Asunción, Paraguay
- Height: 1.70 m (5 ft 7 in)
- Retired: 2002
- Plays: Right-handed (two-handed backhand)
- Prize money: $188,557

Singles
- Career record: 254–182
- Career titles: 11 ITF
- Highest ranking: No. 136 (23 February 1998)

Grand Slam singles results
- French Open: Q3 (1999)
- Wimbledon: Q1 (1993, 1998, 1999)
- US Open: Q3 (1997)

Doubles
- Career record: 156–128
- Career titles: 13 ITF
- Highest ranking: No. 128 (12 October 1998)

Grand Slam doubles results
- Wimbledon: 1R (1999)
- US Open: Q1 (1998)

Other doubles tournaments
- Olympic Games: 1R (1992)

Larissa Schaerer (born 15 April 1975) is a Paraguayan former professional tennis player.

== Biography ==
A right-handed player, Schaerer was born in Asunción and began playing tennis aged eight. She was a member of the Paraguayan team that finished runner-up to Germany at the 1991 World Youth Cup, during which she was unbeaten in singles play. While still a junior, she started her Fed Cup career for Paraguay, first appearing at the age of 16, including in a World Group tie against the Soviet Union. At the 1992 US Open, she reached the semifinals of the girls' singles.

Schaerer represented Paraguay at the 1992 Summer Olympics. She competed in the women's doubles tournament with Rossana de los Ríos as her partner. The pair lost to the French pairing of Isabelle Demongeot and Nathalie Tauziat in the opening round.

On the WTA Tour, her best performances came on the clay courts of the Copa Colsanitas in Bogotá, where she was a semifinalist in 1998 and quarterfinalist in 1999.

It was in doubles that Schaerer made her only main-draw appearance in Grand Slam competition. At the 1999 Wimbledon Championships, she and partner Alina Jidkova lost in the qualifying event but entered the draw as lucky losers. They were beaten in the first round by 12th seeds Mary Joe Fernández and Monica Seles.

Schaerer made her last Fed Cup appearance in 2004. She featured in a total of 55 ties, for 64 wins overall, 39 in singles and 25 in doubles. These all remain national records for Paraguay.

== ITF Circuit finals ==
Legend
$75,000 tournaments
$50,000 tournaments
$25,000 tournaments
$10,000 tournaments

=== Singles: 16 (11–5) ===
Result	No.	Date	Tournament	Surface	Opponent	Score
Loss	1.	8 July 1991	ITF Dublin, Ireland	Clay	(Japan) Miki Yokobori	5–7, 4–6
Loss	2.	23 September 1991	ITF Lima, Peru	Clay	(Paraguay) Rossana de los Ríos	3–6, 1–6
Win	3.	26 October 1992	ITF Asunción, Paraguay	Clay	(Paraguay) Rossana de los Ríos	7–5, 6–1
Loss	4.	22 November 1993	ITF Buenos Aires, Argentina	Clay	(Argentina) Cristina Tessi	6–2, 5–7, 4–6
Win	5.	29 May 1994	ITF Barcelona, Spain	Clay	(Netherlands) Maaike Koutstaal	6–7, 6–3, 6–3
Win	6.	19 June 1994	ITF Sezze, Italy	Clay	(Italy) Flora Perfetti	6–2, 6–3
Win	7.	17 October 1994	ITF Asunción, Paraguay	Clay	(Paraguay) Magalí Benítez	6–4, 6–1
Win	8.	16 October 1995	ITF Asunción, Paraguay	Clay	(Argentina) Mariana Diaz Oliva	6–2, 6–1
Loss	9.	5 May 1996	ITF Florianópolis, Brazil	Clay	(Monaco) Emmanuelle Gagliardi	1–6, 5–7
Win	10.	22 September 1996	ITF Asunción, Paraguay	Clay	(Argentina) Veronica Stele	7–5, 5–7, 6–2
Win	11.	30 June 1997	ITF Campinas, Brazil	Clay	(San Marino) Ludmila Varmužová	6–4, 6–1
Win	12.	18 October 1997	ITF Asunción, Paraguay	Clay	(Argentina) Maria Victoria Beortegui	6–1, 6–2
Win	13.	21 September 1998	ITF Tucumán, Argentina	Clay	(Spain) Gisela Riera	6–4, 6–2
Win	14.	18 October 1998	ITF Asunción, Paraguay	Clay	(Hungary) Zsófia Gubacsi	6–1, 6–4
Loss	15.	27 August 2000	ITF Buenos Aires, Argentina	Clay	(Argentina) Luciana Masante	3–6, 0–6
Win	16.	18 September 2000	ITF Santiago, Chile	Clay	(Argentina) Jorgelina Cravero	6–4, 6–3

=== Doubles: 26 (13–13) ===
Result	No.	Date	Tournament	Surface	Partner	Opponents	Score
Win	1.	26 August 1991	ITF São Paulo, Brazil	Clay	(Paraguay) Rossana de los Ríos	(Argentina) María José Gaidano (Argentina) Cintia Tortorella	6–4, 6–4
Win	2.	23 September 1991	ITF Lima, Peru	Clay	(Paraguay) Rossana de los Ríos	(Ecuador) María Dolores Campana (Brazil) Janaina Mercadante	6–2, 6–3
Win	3.	30 September 1991	ITF La Paz, Bolivia	Clay	(Paraguay) Rossana de los Ríos	(Chile) Paula Cabezas (Brazil) Janaina Mercadante	6–3, 7–5
Win	4.	6 September 1993	ITF Spoleto, Italy	Clay	(Ukraine) Olga Lugina	(Italy) Susanna Attili (Italy) Elena Savoldi	7–5, 7–6^{(5)}
Loss	5.	1 November 1993	ITF Asunción, Paraguay	Clay	(Paraguay) Magalí Benítez	(Argentina) Mariana Diaz Oliva (Argentina) Valentina Solari	5–7, 5–7
Loss	6.	15 November 1993	ITF La Plata, Argentina	Clay	(Brazil) Cláudia Chabalgoity	(Argentina) Laura Montalvo (Argentina) Mercedes Paz	1–6, 4–6
Win	7.	5 June 1995	ITF Novi Sad, Serbia	Clay	(Argentina) Laura Montalvo	(Federal Republic of Yugoslavia) Tatjana Ječmenica (Bulgaria) Antoaneta Pandjerova	5–7, 6–1, 6–1
Win	8.	16 October 1995	ITF Asunción, Paraguay	Clay	(Paraguay) Viviana Valdovinos	(Brazil) Renata Brito (Argentina) Carina Lopez	3–6, 6–2, 6–4
Loss	9.	17 December 1995	ITF Tucumán, Argentina	Clay	(Argentina) Veronica Stele	(Argentina) Laura Montalvo (Argentina) Paola Suárez	2–6, 6–7^{(4)}
Loss	10.	18 February 1996	ITF Cali, Colombia	Clay	(Brazil) Miriam D'Agostini	(Spain) Eva Bes (Spain) Paula Hermida	3–6, 6–2, 3–6
Loss	11.	26 May 1996	ITF Novi Sad, Serbia	Clay	(Brazil) Miriam D'Agostini	(Netherlands) Seda Noorlander (Czech Republic) Helena Vildová	6–4, 1–6, 1–6
Loss	12.	28 July 1996	ITF Buenos Aires, Argentina	Clay	(Argentina) María Fernanda Landa	(Germany) Kirstin Freye (Germany) Caroline Schneider	6–7^{(4)}, 4–6
Win	13.	10 November 1996	ITF São Paulo, Brazil	Clay	(Argentina) Mariana Diaz Oliva	(Brazil) Miriam D'Agostini (Brazil) Andrea Vieira	3–6, 6–4, 6–2
Loss	14.	16 February 1997	ITF Cali, Colombia	Clay	(Portugal) Sofia Prazeres	(Australia) Rachel McQuillan (Germany) Syna Schmidle	2–6, 3–6
Win	15.	30 June 1997	ITF Campinas, Brazil	Clay	(Argentina) Cintia Tortorella	(Brazil) Roberta Burzagli (Brazil) Joana Cortez	5–7, 6–3, 6–3
Win	16.	18 October 1997	ITF Asunción, Paraguay	Clay	(Brazil) Vanessa Menga	(Czech Republic) Monika Maštalířová (Argentina) Paula Racedo	w/o
Win	17.	9 November 1997	ITF Suzano, Brazil	Clay	(Paraguay) Laura Bernal	(Spain) Conchita Martínez Granados (Spain) Gisela Riera	3–6, 6–3, 7–6
Loss	18.	14 December 1997	ITF Bogotá, Colombia	Clay	(Brazil) Eugenia Maia	(Brazil) Miriam D'Agostini (Brazil) Vanessa Menga	2–6, 2–6
Loss	19.	1 June 1998	ITF Tashkent, Uzbekistan	Hard	(Switzerland) Miroslava Vavrinec	(United States) Melissa Mazzotta (Colombia) Fabiola Zuluaga	2–6, 1–6
Win	20.	12 October 1998	ITF Asunción, Paraguay	Clay	(Paraguay) Laura Bernal	(Hungary) Zsófia Gubacsi (Switzerland) Aliénor Tricerri	3–6, 7–6^{(3)}, 6–4
Win	21.	19 September 1999	ITF Asunción, Paraguay	Hard	(Paraguay) Rossana de los Ríos	(Colombia) Mariana Mesa (Switzerland) Aliénor Tricerri	6–2, 6–3
Loss	22.	5 December 1999	ITF Cali, Colombia	Clay	(Brazil) Miriam D'Agostini	(Colombia) Mariana Mesa (Colombia) Fabiola Zuluaga	6–2, 6–7, 1–6
Loss	23.	3 September 2000	ITF Buenos Aires, Argentina	Clay	(Colombia) Mariana Mesa	(Argentina) Melisa Arévalo (Argentina) Paula Racedo	3–6, 5–7
Loss	24.	24 September 2000	ITF Asunción, Paraguay	Clay	(Paraguay) Sarah Tami-Masi	(Argentina) Jorgelina Cravero (Argentina) Gisela Dulko	6–4, 3–6, 3–6
Win	25.	16 October 2000	ITF Gwalior, India	Clay	(Paraguay) Monica Acosta	(India) Rushmi Chakravarthi (India) Sai Jayalakshmy Jayaram	4–2, 4–1, 0–4, 5–3
Loss	26.	29 July 2001	ITF Guayaquil, Ecuador	Clay	(Paraguay) María Alejandra García	(Bolivia) Daniela Álvarez (Uruguay) Ana Lucía Migliarini de León	2–6, 2–6
