= 1998 French Open – Women's singles qualifying =

Women's singles qualifying
- 1998 French Open

Events
Singles	men	women		boys	girls
Doubles	men	women	mixed	boys	girls
WC Singles	men	women	quad
WC Doubles	men	women	quad
Legends	−45	45+	women

Qualification
Singles	men	women
- French Open

The qualifying rounds for the 1998 French Open were played from 21 to 23 May 1998 at the Stade Roland Garros in Paris, France.

== Seeds ==
1. Withdrew
2. (Netherlands) Seda Noorlander (second round)
3. (United States) Jolene Watanabe (first round)
4. (Ukraine) Elena Tatarkova (qualified)
5. (Austria) Sandra Dopfer (first round)
6. (United States) Karin Miller (first round)
7. (Argentina) Mariana Díaz Oliva (qualified)
8. (Czech Republic) Radka Bobková (qualified)
9. (United Kingdom) Samantha Smith (second round)
10. (Austria) Karin Kschwendt (second round)
11. (Japan) Shinobu Asagoe (first round)
12. (Spain) Ana Alcázar (qualified)
13. (Spain) Conchita Martínez Granados (qualifying competition)
14. (United States) Meghann Shaughnessy (qualifying competition)
15. (Romania) Raluca Sandu (first round)
16. (Australia) Kristine Kunce (first round)
17. (Poland) Aleksandra Olsza (qualifying competition)

== Qualifiers ==
1. (Spain) Ana Alcázar
2. (Czech Republic) Radka Bobková
3. (South Africa) Liezel Horn
4. (Belgium) Els Callens
5. (Argentina) Mariana Díaz Oliva
6. (Ukraine) Elena Tatarkova
7. (Zimbabwe) Cara Black
8. (Spain) Eva Bes Ostáriz

== Draw ==
=== First qualifier ===
First round
17	(Poland) Aleksandra Olsza	6	7^{7}
WC	(France) Élodie Le Bescond	2	6^{3}
(Canada) Martina Nejedly	4	6^{5}
(Paraguay) Larissa Schaerer	6	7^{7}
(United Kingdom) Lorna Woodroffe	4	3
(United States) Erika deLone	6	6
(United States) Lindsay Lee	2	4
12	(Spain) Ana Alcázar	6	6

Second round
17	(Poland) Aleksandra Olsza	6	6
(Paraguay) Larissa Schaerer	3	3
(United States) Erika deLone	1	4
12	(Spain) Ana Alcázar	6	6

Qualifying competition
17	(Poland) Aleksandra Olsza	4	7	0
12	(Spain) Ana Alcázar	6	5	6

=== Second qualifier ===
First round
13	(Spain) Conchita Martínez Granados	6	6
(Australia) Siobhan Drake-Brockman	3	3
(Belgium) Daphne van de Zande	1	4
(Australia) Evie Dominikovic	6	6
(Sweden) Kristina Triska	1	2
(United Kingdom) Julie Pullin	6	6
PR	(France) Virginie Buisson	4	6^{1}
8	(Czech Republic) Radka Bobková	6	7^{7}

Second round
13	(Spain) Conchita Martínez Granados	2	6	6
(Australia) Evie Dominikovic	6	1	2
(United Kingdom) Julie Pullin	0	3
8	(Czech Republic) Radka Bobková	6	6

Qualifying competition
13	(Spain) Conchita Martínez Granados	2	0
8	(Czech Republic) Radka Bobková	6	6

=== Third qualifier ===
First round
3	(United States) Jolene Watanabe	6	0	6
(United Kingdom) Karen Cross	3	6	8
WC	(France) Edith Nunes-Bersot	4	6	10
WC	(France) Sophie Erre	6	1	8
(Belgium) Nancy Feber	5	6	2
(South Africa) Liezel Horn	7	2	6
(Germany) Veronika Martinek	6	6
16	(Australia) Kristine Kunce	1	3

Second round
(United Kingdom) Karen Cross	7	6
WC	(France) Edith Nunes-Bersot	5	1
(South Africa) Liezel Horn	6	6
(Germany) Veronika Martinek	3	4

Qualifying competition
(United Kingdom) Karen Cross	4	2
(South Africa) Liezel Horn	6	6

=== Fourth qualifier ===
First round
9	(United Kingdom) Samantha Smith	7^{7}	1	6
WC	(France) Virginie Razzano	6^{3}	6	4
(Bulgaria) Svetlana Krivencheva	6^{0}	2
(Belgium) Els Callens	7^{7}	6
(United States) Brie Rippner	5	6	9
(Japan) Rika Hiraki	7	2	7
(Italy) Adriana Serra Zanetti	6	6
6	(United States) Karin Miller	3	4

Second round
9	(United Kingdom) Samantha Smith	4	2
(Belgium) Els Callens	6	6
(United States) Brie Rippner	3	3
(Italy) Adriana Serra Zanetti	6	6

Qualifying competition
(Belgium) Els Callens	6	5	6
(Italy) Adriana Serra Zanetti	3	7	1

=== Fifth qualifier ===
First round
7	(Argentina) Mariana Díaz Oliva	6	6
(Czech Republic) Ludmila Richterová	0	2
WC	(France) Kildine Chevalier	1	2
(Spain) Alicia Ortuño	6	6
(Hungary) Rita Kuti-Kis	6	7^{9}
(South Korea) Jeon Mi-ra	1	6^{7}
(Germany) Marlene Weingärtner	3	6	7
11	(Japan) Shinobu Asagoe	6	4	5

Second round
7	(Argentina) Mariana Díaz Oliva	4	6	6
(Spain) Alicia Ortuño	6	3	3
(Hungary) Rita Kuti-Kis	1	6	3
(Germany) Marlene Weingärtner	6	3	6

Qualifying competition
7	(Argentina) Mariana Díaz Oliva	6	6
(Germany) Marlene Weingärtner	2	2

=== Sixth qualifier ===
First round
14	(United States) Meghann Shaughnessy	6^{5}	7	6
Alt	(United Kingdom) Joanne Ward	7^{7}	5	1
WC	(France) Sophie Georges	4	3
(South Korea) Kim Eun-ha	6	6
(South Africa) Surina De Beer	4	7^{7}	6
(Czech Republic) Petra Langrová	6	6^{2}	4
(Czech Republic) Eva Martincová	2	3
4	(Ukraine) Elena Tatarkova	6	6

Second round
14	(United States) Meghann Shaughnessy	5	7	6
(South Korea) Kim Eun-ha	7	5	4
(South Africa) Surina De Beer	3	1
4	(Ukraine) Elena Tatarkova	6	6

Qualifying competition
14	(United States) Meghann Shaughnessy	4	6^{2}
4	(Ukraine) Elena Tatarkova	6	7^{7}

=== Seventh qualifier ===
First round
5	(Austria) Sandra Dopfer	4	6	2
WC	(Zimbabwe) Cara Black	6	2	6
(Colombia) Fabiola Zuluaga	3	6	7
(Canada) Maureen Drake	6	3	5
(Belgium) Laurence Courtois	6	6
WC	(France) Karolina Jagieniak	0	1
(Australia) Catherine Barclay	6	6^{4}	0
10	(Austria) Karin Kschwendt	3	7^{7}	6

Second round
WC	(Zimbabwe) Cara Black	6	6
(Colombia) Fabiola Zuluaga	2	3
(Belgium) Laurence Courtois	6	6
10	(Austria) Karin Kschwendt	2	2

Qualifying competition
WC	(Zimbabwe) Cara Black	6	2	6
(Belgium) Laurence Courtois	1	6	3

=== Eighth qualifier ===
First round
15	(Romania) Raluca Sandu	0	7	6
(Italy) Tathiana Garbin	6	5	8
(Spain) Eva Bes Ostáriz	6	2	6
(Slovenia) Tina Križan	2	6	4
(India) Nirupama Vaidyanathan	3	3
PR	(Netherlands) Petra Kamstra	6	6
(Federal Republic of Yugoslavia) Sandra Načuk	4	4
2	(Netherlands) Seda Noorlander	6	6

Second round
(Italy) Tathiana Garbin	6	4	5
(Spain) Eva Bes Ostáriz	4	6	7
PR	(Netherlands) Petra Kamstra	6	2	6
2	(Netherlands) Seda Noorlander	4	6	4

Qualifying competition
(Spain) Eva Bes Ostáriz	6	6
PR	(Netherlands) Petra Kamstra	2	3
