= Virginie Razzano =

French tennis player (born 1983)

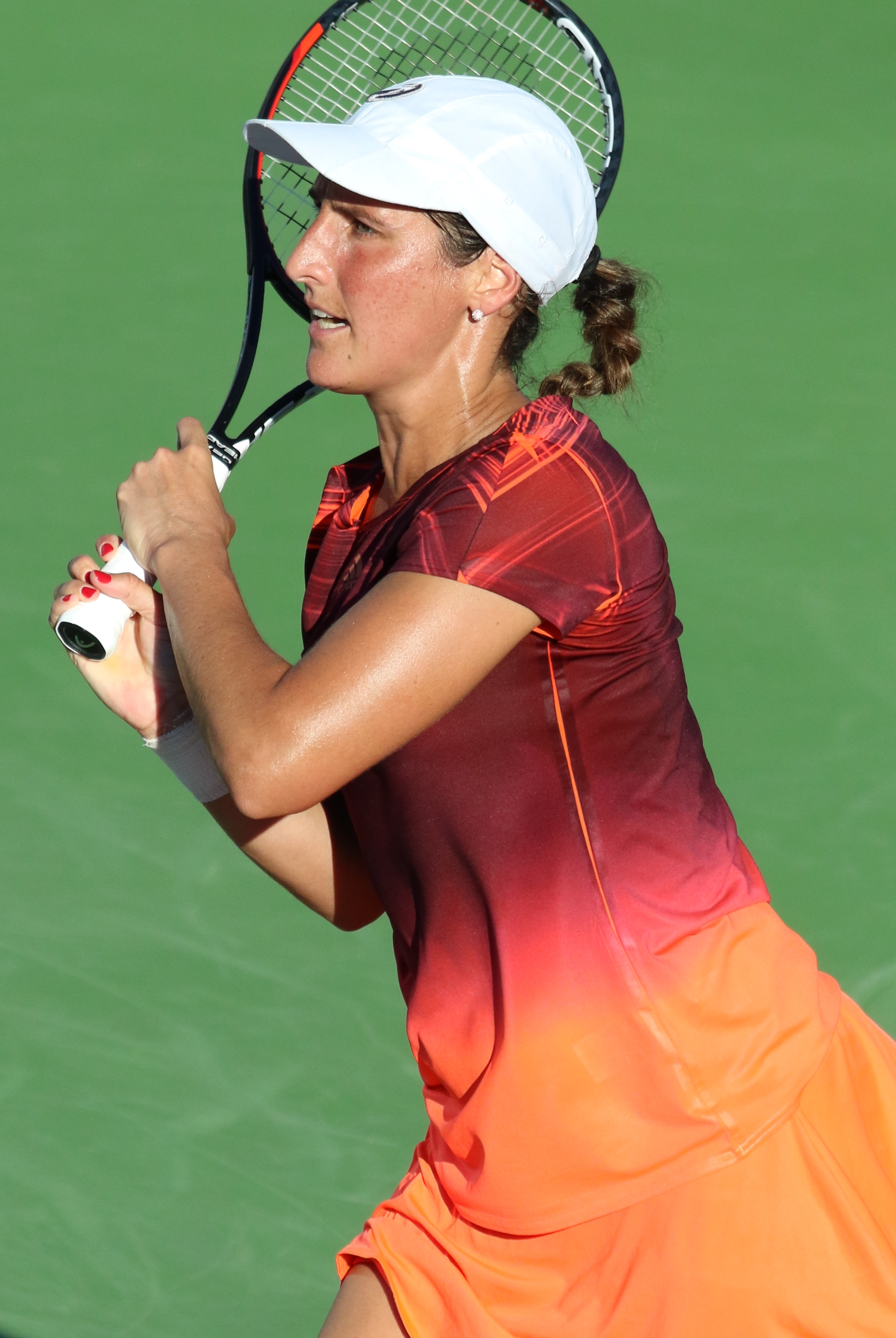
- Virginie Razzano at the 2016 US Open
- Country (sports): France
- Residence: Nîmes, France
- Born: 12 May 1983 (age 42) Dijon, France
- Height: 1.73 m (5 ft 8 in)
- Turned pro: 1999
- Retired: 6 December 2018
- Plays: Right-handed (two-handed backhand)
- Prize money: $3,510,457

Singles
- Career record: 407–376
- Career titles: 2 WTA, 5 ITF
- Highest ranking: No. 16 (14 September 2009)

Grand Slam singles results
- Australian Open: 3R (2001, 2006, 2008, 2009)
- French Open: 4R (2009)
- Wimbledon: 4R (2009)
- US Open: 4R (2006)

Doubles
- Career record: 60–88
- Career titles: 1 WTA, 5 ITF
- Highest ranking: No. 82 (12 February 2001)

Grand Slam doubles results
- Australian Open: 2R (2002)
- French Open: 2R (2000)
- Wimbledon: 2R (2001, 2005)
- US Open: QF (2008)

Grand Slam mixed doubles results
- Australian Open: 2R (2008)
- French Open: QF (2008)
- Wimbledon: 1R (2008)
- US Open: 2R (2008)

Team competitions
- Fed Cup: W (2003)

Virginie Razzano (born 12 May 1983) is a French former professional tennis player. She won two WTA Tour singles titles, both in 2007. Razzano reached her career-high WTA singles ranking of No. 16 on 14 September 2009. She represented France in the Fed Cup from 2001 to 2014; her overall Fed Cup win–loss record is 16–9 (singles 10–5, doubles 6–4).

== Career ==
=== 2005 ===
She was chosen by Georges Goven to play in the Fed Cup first round when Tatiana Golovin had an injury and Marion Bartoli and Émilie Loit were suspended. However, she was replaced by Séverine Brémond Beltrame because of injury in the quarterfinals.

=== 2006–2007 ===
On 31 August 2006, Razzano upset eighth seed Martina Hingis in the second round of the US Open. On 2 January 2007, she defeated former world No. 5, Daniela Hantuchová, in straight sets in the second round at the Auckland Open. In the first round at Wimbledon, she was upset by unseeded Yvonne Meusburger. At Forest Hills, she lost in her second WTA Tour final to Gisela Dulko.

On 30 September 2007, Razzano won her first singles title in Guangzhou. As the No. 2 seed, she defeated first-time finalist, 34-year-old Israeli Tzipora Obziler, to claim the title and become the 2007 Guangzhou International Women's Open champion. A week later, she claimed her second career title, also in Asia, beating former No. 1 Venus Williams in three sets at the Japan Open Tennis Championships in Tokyo.

=== 2008 ===
On 8 January, Razzano lost to Ana Ivanovic in the first round of the Sydney International in three sets. In the third set, Razzano was ahead 5–2, only to see Ivanovic win the next five games, and eventually proceed to the semifinals.

In August, she was a member of the French team that competed at the Beijing Olympics.

=== 2009 ===
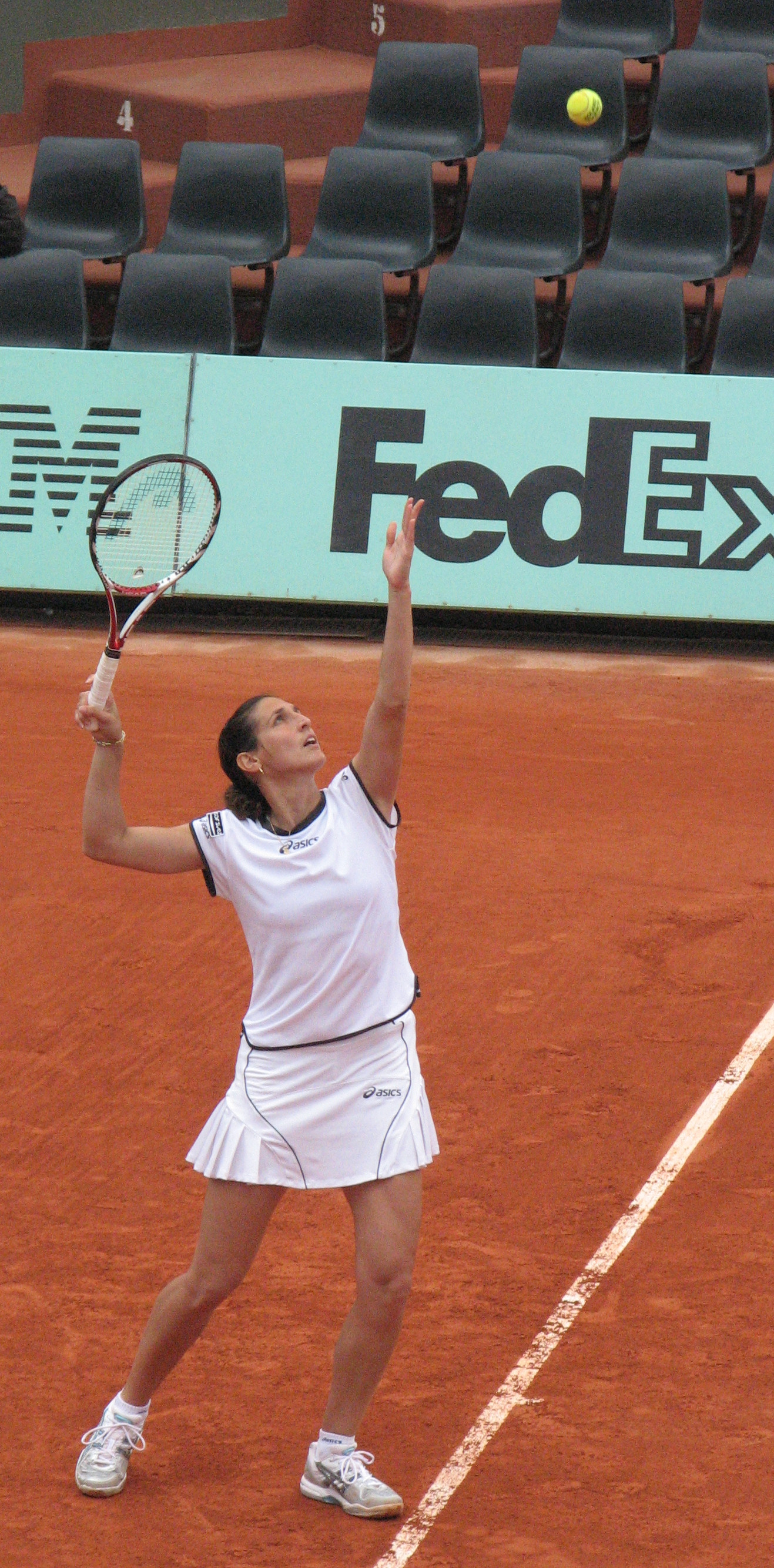
Razzano at the 2009 French Open

In her first match of the year, Razzano was defeated by Barbora Záhlavová-Strýcová in the first round in Auckland. At the Hobart International, Razzano reached the semifinal where she lost to Petra Kvitová. Ranked 56 at the Australian Open, Razzano beat Jarmila Gajdošová and 14th seeded Patty Schnyder en route to the third round, where she lost to 18th seed Dominika Cibulková.

Razzano fell in the first round of the Open GdF Suez to Anastasia Pavlyuchenkova. However, she rebounded at the Dubai Tennis Championships. She advanced to the final after victories over Kateryna Bondarenko, second seed Dinara Safina, Daniela Hantuchová, fifth seed Vera Zvonareva, and 16h seed Kaia Kanepi. She was defeated in the final by sixth seed Venus Williams.

In March, Razzano competed at the Indian Wells Open. After beating Evgeniya Rodina, she was forced to retire during her second-round match against 18th seed Kaia Kanepi due to a back injury. Razzano fell in the first round of the Miami Open to qualifier Julia Görges.

At Ponte Vedra Beach, Razzano defeated Akgul Amanmuradova in the first round, but lost in the second round to second seed and eventual champion Caroline Wozniacki. Razzano reached the quarterfinals of Charleston as the 13th seed, but lost again to Wozniacki, again in straight sets. She was defeated in the second round of the Internazionali d'Italia by world No. 1 and eventual champion, Dinara Safina. She lost to Elena Vesnina in the second round of Madrid.

At the French Open, Razzano was unseeded and defeated former world No. 5, Daniela Hantuchová, in the first round. She then thrashed 18th seed Anabel Medina Garrigues in two sets, in the second round and beat Tathiana Garbin in the third round in two tight sets. She lost in the fourth round to 30th seed Samantha Stosur. As a result of these wins, Razzano's ranking improved to world No. 26.

After withdrawing from a tournament in Birmingham with a lower back injury, Razzano entered the tournament in Eastbourne, where she was unseeded. She defeated fellow Frenchwoman Alizé Cornet in the first round. She then beat the top seed and world No. 4, Elena Dementieva, winning the decisive third-set tiebreak. She followed this win up with a win over eighth seed and defending champion, Agnieszka Radwańska, in the quarterfinals. In the semifinals, she was up 6–4, 1–0 when Marion Bartoli was forced to retire with a right quad strain. She lost in the final to sixth seed Caroline Wozniacki. However, Razzano's ranking improved to world No. 23.

At Wimbledon, Razzano was seeded 26th. In the first round, her opponent Tamira Paszek retired after falling behind 6–0, 3–1. After a win over Jill Craybas in the second round, her third-round opponent Vera Zvonareva withdrew to allow Razzano to her first Wimbledon fourth round. Razzano then fell, 2–6, 6–7, to Francesca Schiavone in the fourth round. Despite this loss, Razzano reached a new career-high ranking of world No. 17.

Razzano started her US Open Series campaign in Los Angeles, where she was seeded 11th. She lost in the first round to Anna Chakvetadze. She was seeded 16th at Cincinnati, but also lost in the first round to Anna-Lena Grönefeld. Razzano played her last tournament before the US Open in New Haven. Unseeded in singles, she defeated world No. 20, Patty Schnyder in three sets, in the first round. Fifth seed Agnieszka Radwańska had to retire due to injury in the second round with the score at one set all. Razzano was defeated by Caroline Wozniacki in the quarterfinals. Razzano was seeded 16th at the US Open, but suffered a surprise defeat in the first round to eventual semifinalist Yanina Wickmayer.

Razzano continued her disappointing end to the season in Tokyo as the 16th seed, losing to Iveta Benešová, in the first round. She was forced to pull out of the China Open due to a left calf strain. This turned out to be the end of Razzano's season. She finished her best season on tour ranked world No. 19.

=== 2010 ===
Razzano started her 2010 campaign at the Auckland Open, where she was seeded fifth. She defeated Monica Niculescu in the first round, but she lost in the second round to Kimiko Date-Krumm. She also fell 3–6, 0–6 to Daniela Hantuchová in the first round in Sydney. Razzano was seeded 18th at the Australian Open, but suffered another surprise defeat in the first round to Ekaterina Makarova. This caused her to fall out of the top 20 in the world rankings. Another first-round defeat followed in Paris, where she lost to Patty Schnyder. Razzano continued her season in Dubai where, as an unseeded player, she defeated Selima Sfar in the first round, before losing to world No. 22 and in-form Shahar Pe'er, in the second round. Due to her not defending her points from reaching the final the previous year, Razzano saw a huge change in her ranking as it fell to world No. 39. Razzano next competed at Indian Wells where she defeated Kristina Barrois in the second round, before losing to 32nd seed Maria Kirilenko in the third. At the US Open, she beat Klara Zakopalova and upset 13th seed Marion Bartoli, before losing to former No. 1 Ana Ivanovic in the third round.

=== 2011 ===
Razzano started off the year losing in the second qualifying round to Vania King at the Brisbane International.

Prior to the French Open's start, Razzano's fiancé and former coach, Stephane Vidal, died of a brain tumor. She elected to play despite her loss, knowing that Vidal encouraged her to participate at Roland Garros. She met 24th-seeded Jarmila Gajdošová in the first round, but lost with a score of 3–6, 1–6.

=== 2012 ===
At the French Open, Razzano handed the No. 5 seed Serena Williams her first-ever singles first-round defeat in a Grand Slam tournament. Razzano came back from a set and 1–5 down in the second-set tie-break to emerge victorious in three sets. At the time, Razzano was ranked 106 places lower than Williams, who was the favourite for the title entering the tournament. She was up 5–0 in the final set at one point and needed eight match points to close out the match. She lost to Arantxa Rus in the second round, in straight sets.

=== 2016 ===
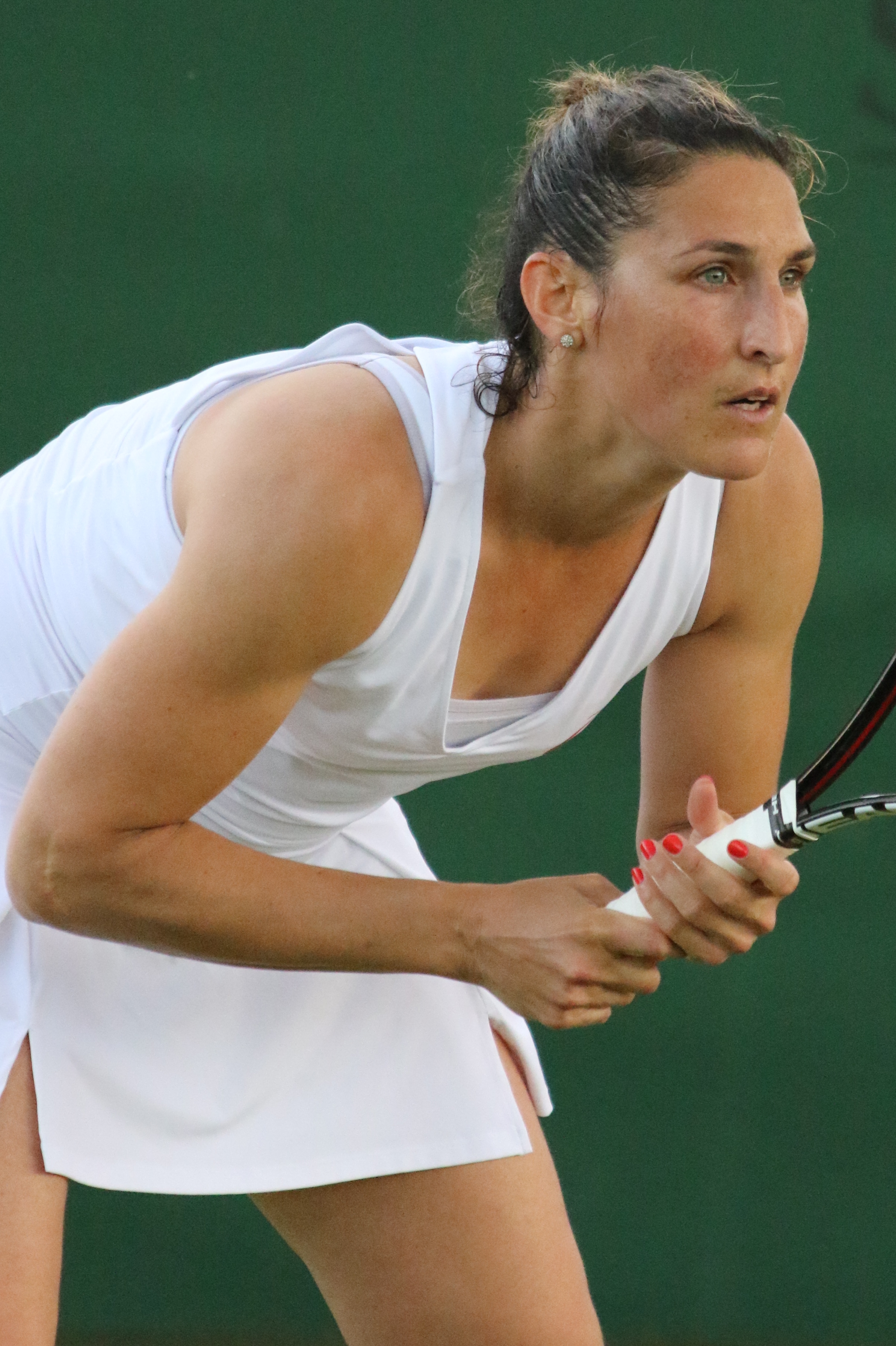
Razzano during the 2016 Wimbledon Qualifying

Razzano began the season at the Brisbane International. She lost in the first round of qualifying to Kaia Kanepi.

In May, Razzano reached the singles semifinals of the Internationaux de Strasbourg for the second consecutive year. She lost her semifinal match narrowly to Caroline Garcia. Three Frenchwomen - Razzano, Garcia and Kristina Mladenovic - reached the semifinals of that tournament. The last time three Frenchwomen made it this far at a WTA tournament was in 2006, when Tatiana Golovin, Mary Pierce and Amélie Mauresmo advanced to the semifinals of the Open Gaz de France, with Mauresmo eventually winning the singles title.

== Grand Slam performance timelines ==
Key
W	F	SF	QF	#R	RR	Q#	P#	DNQ	A	Z#	PO	G	S	B	NMS	NTI	P	NH

(W) winner; (F) finalist; (SF) semifinalist; (QF) quarterfinalist; (#R) rounds 4, 3, 2, 1; (RR) round-robin stage; (Q#) qualification round; (P#) preliminary round; (DNQ) did not qualify; (A) absent; (Z#) Davis/Fed Cup Zonal Group (with number indication) or (PO) play-off; (G) gold, (S) silver or (B) bronze Olympic/Paralympic medal; (NMS) not a Masters tournament; (NTI) not a Tier I tournament; (P) postponed; (NH) not held; (SR) strike rate (events won / competed); (W–L) win–loss record.
To avoid confusion and double counting, these charts are updated at the conclusion of a tournament or when the player's participation has ended.

=== Singles ===
Tournament	1998	1999	2000	2001	2002	2003	2004	2005	2006	2007	2008	2009	2010	2011	2012	2013	2014	2015	2016	2017	2018	W–L
Australian Open	A	A	1R	3R	1R	2R	A	1R	3R	2R	3R	3R	1R	2R	1R	Q1	2R	Q2	Q3	Q3	A	12–13
French Open	Q1	1R	3R	3R	2R	1R	2R	3R	1R	1R	1R	4R	1R	1R	2R	3R	1R	2R	2R	Q3	A	15–18
Wimbledon	A	A	A	1R	2R	2R	3R	2R	1R	1R	1R	4R	A	2R	1R	1R	1R	A	Q2	A	A	8–13
US Open	A	A	Q3	2R	2R	2R	1R	2R	4R	2R	1R	1R	3R	1R	1R	1R	1R	Q1	1R	A	A	10–15
Win–loss	0–0	0–1	2–2	5–4	3–4	3–4	3–3	4–4	5–4	2–4	2–4	8–4	2–3	2–4	1–4	2–3	1–4	1–1	1–2	0–0	0–0	45–59

=== Doubles ===
Tournament	1999	2000	2001	2002	2003	2004	2005	2006	2007	2008	2009	2010	2011	2012	2013	2014	2015	2016	2017	2018	W–L
Australian Open	A	A	1R	2R	A	A	A	1R	A	1R	1R	2R	A	2R	A	A	A	A	A	A	3–7
French Open	1R	2R	1R	1R	1R	1R	1R	1R	1R	1R	1R	1R	1R	1R	1R	1R	1R	1R	1R	A	1–19
Wimbledon	A	A	2R	A	A	A	2R	1R	1R	1R	1R	A	A	1R	A	A	A	A	A	A	2–7
US Open	A	A	1R	A	A	A	2R	A	1R	QF	2R	A	1R	A	A	A	A	A	A	A	5–6
Win–loss	0–1	1–1	1–4	1–2	0–1	0–1	2–3	0–3	0–3	3–4	1–4	1–2	0–2	1–3	0–1	0–1	0–1	0–1	0–1	0–0	11–39

== WTA Tour finals ==
=== Singles: 6 (2 titles, 4 runner-ups) ===
Legend
Premier M & Premier 5 (0–1)
Premier (0–1)
International (2–2)

Result	W–L	Date	Tournament	Tier	Surface	Opponent	Score
Loss	0–1	Oct 2004	Tashkent Open, Uzbekistan	Tier IV (Note: In 2009, the WTA Tier II tournaments were reclassified as WTA Premier tournaments, while the WTA Tier III tournaments, WTA Tier IV tournaments and WTA Tier V tournaments were reclassified as WTA International tournaments.)	Hard	(Czech Republic) Nicole Vaidišová	7–5, 3–6, 2–6
Loss	0–2	Aug 2007	Forest Hills Classic, United States	Tier IV	Hard	(Argentina) Gisela Dulko	2–6, 2–6
Win	1–2	Sep 2007	Guangzhou International, China	Tier III	Hard	(Israel) Tzipora Obziler	6–0, 6–3
Win	2–2	Oct 2007	Japan Women's Open	Tier III	Hard	(United States) Venus Williams	4–6, 7–6^{(9–7)}, 6–4
Loss	2–3	Feb 2009	Dubai Championships, UAE	Premier 5	Hard	(United States) Venus Williams	4–6, 2–6
Loss	2–4	Jun 2009	Eastbourne International, UK	Premier	Grass	(Denmark) Caroline Wozniacki	6–7^{(5–7)}, 5–7

=== Doubles: 1 (title) ===
Legend
Premier M & Premier 5
Premier (1–0)
International

Result	Date	Tournament	Tier	Surface	Partner	Opponents	Score
Win	Feb 2001	Open GDF Suez, France	Tier II	Carpet (i)	(Croatia) Iva Majoli	(United States) Kimberly Po (France) Nathalie Tauziat	6–3, 7–5
