= Lorna Woodroffe =

English tennis player

- Country (sports): United Kingdom
- Born: 18 August 1976 (age 48); Epsom, Surrey, UK
- Height: 5 ft 6 in (168 cm)
- Prize money: $254,301

Singles
- Career record: 177–214
- Career titles: 1 ITF
- Highest ranking: No. 133 (26 January 1998)

Grand Slam singles results
- Australian Open: Q1 (2001)
- French Open: Q1 (1998)
- Wimbledon: 2R (1997)
- US Open: Q2 (1997, 1998)

Doubles
- Career record: 249–145
- Career titles: 28 ITF
- Highest ranking: No. 69 (3 November 1997)

Grand Slam doubles results
- Australian Open: 2R (2001)
- French Open: 2R (2001)
- Wimbledon: 2R (2000)
- US Open: 1R (1997, 1998, 2000)

Other doubles tournaments
- Olympic Games: 1R (2000)

Mixed doubles
- Career record: 1–4
- Career titles: 0

Grand Slam mixed doubles results
- Wimbledon: 2R (1998)

Lorna Woodroffe (born 18 August 1976) is an English former tennis player.

She competed in the 2000 Summer Olympics in Sydney, Australia. Playing with Julie Pullin, she lost her first-round match in the women's doubles to Kristie Boogert and Miriam Oremans of the Netherlands, in two sets.

== WTA career finals ==
=== Doubles: 1 (runner-up) ===
Legend
Tier I
Tier II
Tier III
Tier IV & V

Result	Date	Tournament	Surface	Partner	Opponents	Score
Loss	May 1997	Welsh Open, UK	Clay	(United Kingdom) Julie Pullin	(Australia) Kerry-Anne Guse (United States) Debbie Graham	3–6, 4–6

== ITF finals ==
$100,000 tournaments
$75,000 tournaments
$50,000 tournaments
$25,000 tournaments
$10,000 tournaments

=== Singles (1–6) ===
Result	No.	Date	Tournament	Surface	Opponent	Score
Loss	1.	28 February 1994	ITF Buchen, Germany	Carpet (i)	(Netherlands) Chantal Reuter	7–6, 2–6, 5–7
Loss	2.	6 October 1996	ITF Nottingham, United Kingdom	Hard (i)	(Sweden) Sofia Finér	3–6, 2–6
Win	1.	9 February 1997	ITF Sunderland, United Kingdom	Hard	(Italy) Alessia Lombardi	6–4, 2–6, 6–4
Loss	3.	30 March 1997	ITF Warrnambool, Australia	Grass	(Australia) Mireille Dittmann	6–3, 6–7, 4–6
Loss	4.	21 February 1998	ITF Redbridge, United Kingdom	Hard (i)	(Federal Republic of Yugoslavia) Sandra Načuk	4–6, 3–6
Loss	5.	28 February 1999	ITF Bushey, United Kingdom	Carpet (i)	(Croatia) Jelena Kostanić Tošić	6–7, 3–6
Loss	6.	16 July 2000	ITF Felixstowe, United Kingdom	Grass	(Italy) Roberta Vinci	2–6, 2–6

=== Doubles (28–23) ===
Result	No.	Date	Tournament	Surface	Partner	Opponents	Score
Win	1.	10 February 1992	ITF Swindon, United Kingdom	Carpet	(United Kingdom) Julie Pullin	(United States) Jacqueline Geller (United States) Tina Samara	6–4, 6–4
Loss	1.	4 May 1992	ITF Lee-on-the-Solent, United Kingdom	Clay	(United Kingdom) Julie Pullin	(United Kingdom) Alison Smith (United Kingdom) Tamsin Wainwright	1–6, 4–6
Loss	2.	19 April 1993	ITF Nottingham, United Kingdom	Hard	(United Kingdom) Julie Salmon	(Russia) Natalia Egorova (Russia) Svetlana Parkhomenko	1–5 ret.
Loss	3.	3 May 1993	ITF Bracknell, United Kingdom	Hard	(United Kingdom) Claire Taylor	(Russia) Natalia Egorova (Russia) Svetlana Parkhomenko]	6–7, 1–6
Loss	4.	4 October 1993	ITF Basingstoke, United Kingdom	Hard	(Netherlands) Caroline Stassen	(Russia) Natalia Egorova (Russia) Svetlana Parkhomenko	2–6, 1–6
Loss	5.	4 July 1994	ITF Felixstowe, United Kingdom	Grass	(Netherlands) Caroline Stassen	(Russia) Natalia Egorova (Russia) Svetlana Parkhomenko	3–6, 5–7
Loss	6.	6 February 1995	ITF Sheffield, United Kingdom	Hard	(United Kingdom) Amanda Wainwright	(Russia) Natalia Egorova (Russia) Svetlana Parkhomenko	4–6, 2–6
Win	2.	24 April 1995	ITF Edinburgh, United Kingdom	Clay	(Australia) Robyn Mawdsley	(United Kingdom) Karen Cross (United Kingdom) Lizzie Jelfs	6–3, 6–1
Win	3.	5 February 1996	ITF Sunderland, United Kingdom	Hard	(United Kingdom) Julie Pullin	(Australia) Melissa Beadman (Estonia) Helen Laupa	6–4, 7–5
Loss	7.	18 February 1996	ITF Sheffield, United Kingdom	Hard (i)	(United Kingdom) Julie Pullin	(United Kingdom) Lucie Ahl (United Kingdom) Joanne Ward	6–7, 3–6
Loss	8.	22 April 1996	ITF Edinburgh, United Kingdom	Clay	(United Kingdom) Julie Pullin	(United Kingdom) Helen Crook (United Kingdom) Victoria Davies	2–6, 0–6
Loss	9.	11 August 1996	ITF Southsea, United Kingdom	Grass	(United Kingdom) Louise Latimer	(United Kingdom) Shirli-Ann Siddall (United Kingdom) Lucie Ahl	2–6, 6–7
Win	4.	29 September 1996	ITF Telford, United Kingdom	Hard (i)	(United Kingdom) Julie Pullin	(Russia) Natalia Egorova (Netherlands) Henriëtte van Aalderen	6–2, 7–6^{(4)}
Win	5.	6 October 1996	ITF Nottingham, United Kingdom	Hard (i)	(United Kingdom) Julie Pullin	(United Kingdom) Emily Bond (United Kingdom) Ekaterina Roubanova	6–2, 6–4
Win	6.	28 October 1996	ITF Edinburgh, United Kingdom	Hard	(United Kingdom) Julie Pullin	(Dominican Republic) Joelle Schad (Germany) Syna Schmidle	6–3, 6–4
Win	7.	16 February 1997	ITF Birmingham, United Kingdom	Hard	(United Kingdom) Julie Pullin	(United Kingdom) Shirli-Ann Siddall (United Kingdom) Amanda Wainwright	6–2, 6–4
Win	8.	23 February 1997	ITF Redbridge, United Kingdom	Hard (i)	(United Kingdom) Julie Pullin	(Australia) Kerry-Anne Guse (United Kingdom) Clare Wood	2–6, 6–4, 6–4
Win	9.	24 March 1997	ITF Warrnambool, Australia	Grass	(United Kingdom) Joanne Ward	(Australia) Evie Dominikovic (Australia) Amanda Grahame	4–6, 6–4, 6–2
Loss	10.	30 March 1997	ITF Warrnambool, Australia	Grass	(United Kingdom) Joanne Ward	(South Africa) Nannie de Villiers (United Kingdom) Shirli-Ann Siddall	6–3, 2–6, 3–6
Loss	11.	27 April 1997	ITF Bournemouth, United Kingdom	Clay	(United Kingdom) Julie Pullin	(United Kingdom) Amanda Wainwright (United Kingdom) Shirli-Ann Siddall	3–6, 5–7
Win	10.	19 July 1997	ITF Frinton, United Kingdom	Clay	(United Kingdom) Joanne Ward	(United Kingdom) Karen Cross (Soviet Union) Natalia Egorova	6–4, 2–6, 6–0
Loss	12.	17 August 1997	ITF Bronx, United States	Hard	(United Kingdom) Shirli-Ann Siddall	(Australia) Lisa McShea (Australia) Rachel McQuillan	2–6, 1–6
Win	11.	19 October 1997	ITF Southampton, United Kingdom	Carpet (i)	(United Kingdom) Julie Pullin	(Czech Republic) Lenka Cenková (Federal Republic of Yugoslavia) Sandra Načuk	6–2, 6–1
Win	12.	2 November 1997	ITF Edinburgh, United Kingdom	Hard (i)	(United Kingdom) Julie Pullin	(Netherlands) Amanda Hopmans (Netherlands) Seda Noorlander	6–3, 6–1
Win	13.	26 July 1998	ITF Peachtree, United States	Hard	(United Kingdom) Julie Pullin	(Canada) Vanessa Webb (United States) Keri Phebus	3–6, 6–2, 6–4
Win	14.	23 August 1998	ITF Bronx, United States	Hard	(United Kingdom) Julie Pullin	(Greece) Christína Papadáki (France) Sarah Pitkowski-Malcor	6–3, 6–1
Win	15.	1 February 1999	ITF Sheffield, United Kingdom	Hard (i)	(United Kingdom) Lizzie Jelfs	(South Africa) Surina De Beer (Netherlands) Kim de Weille	3–6, 6–4, 6–3
Loss	13.	10 May 1999	ITF Edinburgh, United Kingdom	Clay	(South Africa) Surina De Beer	(Tunisia) Selima Sfar (United Kingdom) Joanne Ward	4–6, 2–6
Win	16.	5 June 1999	Surbiton Trophy, United Kingdom	Grass	(United Kingdom) Julie Pullin	(Japan) Rika Hiraki (United States) Linda Wild	w/o
Loss	14.	31 July 1999	ITF Edinburgh, United Kingdom	Clay	(Australia) Trudi Musgrave	(Romania) Magda Mihalache (Hungary) Petra Mandula	6–3, 4–6, 3–6
Win	17.	18 October 1999	ITF Southampton, United Kingdom	Carpet (i)	(United Kingdom) Julie Pullin	(Romania) Magda Mihalache (Slovakia) Zuzana Váleková	6–3, 6–2
Win	18.	7 November 1999	ITF Hull, United Kingdom	Hard (i)	(United Kingdom) Julie Pullin	(Czech Republic) Michaela Paštiková (Germany) Jasmin Wöhr	6–4, 6–3
Win	19.	13 December 1999	ITF New Delhi, India	Hard	(Japan) Rika Hiraki	(Italy) Tathiana Garbin (India) Nirupama Sanjeev	5–2 ret.
Loss	15.	20 February 2000	ITF Redbridge, United Kingdom	Hard (i)	(United Kingdom) Julie Pullin	(France) Alexandra Fusai (Slovenia) Tina Križan	6–7^{(4)}, 6–3, 6–7^{(1)}
Loss	16.	21 February 2000	ITF Bushey, United Kingdom	Carpet (i)	(United Kingdom) Julie Pullin	(Australia) Annabel Ellwood (Belarus) Nadejda Ostrovskaya	1–6, 1–6
Win	20.	24 April 2000	ITF Bournemouth, United Kingdom	Clay	(Tunisia) Selima Sfar	(United Kingdom) Hannah Collin (Hungary) Zsófia Gubacsi	6–1, 6–0
Loss	17.	15 May 2000	ITF Edinburgh, United Kingdom	Clay	(Tunisia) Selima Sfar	(South Africa) Natalie Grandin (South Africa) Nicole Rencken	6–0, 3–6, 4–6
Win	21.	16 July 2000	ITF Felixstowe, United Kingdom	Grass	(Australia) Trudi Musgrave	(United Kingdom) Lucie Ahl (Russia) Natalia Egorova	6–4, 3–6, 6–4
Loss	18.	17 July 2000	ITF Valladolid, Spain	Clay	(Australia) Trudi Musgrave	(Spain) María José Martínez Sánchez (Spain) Alicia Ortuño	2–6, 4–6
Loss	19.	30 July 2000	ITF Dublin, Ireland	Carpet	(Australia) Trudi Musgrave	(Australia) Catherine Barclay (Netherlands) Andrea van den Hurk	4–6, 5–7
Win	22.	22 October 2000	ITF Cardiff, United Kingdom	Carpet (i)	(United Kingdom) Julie Pullin	(Italy) Giulia Casoni (Belgium) Laurence Courtois	0–6, 6–1, 6–3
Win	23.	30 October 2000	ITF Hull, United Kingdom	Hard (i)	(United Kingdom) Julie Pullin	(Germany) Mia Buric (Germany) Syna Schmidle	4–1, 1–4, 4–1, 5–4^{(4)}
Win	24.	11 February 2001	ITF Redbridge, United Kingdom	Hard (i)	(United Kingdom) Julie Pullin	(Kazakhstan) Irina Selyutina (Slovenia) Tina Križan	6–1, 6–3
Win	25.	25 March 2001	ITF La Cañada, United States	Hard	(United Kingdom) Julie Pullin	(Japan) Rika Hiraki (South Korea) Kim Eun-ha	6–2, 6–4
Loss	20.	6 May 2001	ITF Gifu, Japan	Hard	(United Kingdom) Julie Pullin	(Indonesia) Wynne Prakusya (South Korea) Kim Eun-ha	6–1, 4–6, 6–7^{(2)}
Loss	21.	13 May 2001	Fukuoka International, Japan	Grass	(United Kingdom) Julie Pullin	(Japan) Rika Hiraki (United States) Nana Smith	0–6, 6–7^{(3)}
Win	26.	20 May 2001	ITF Edinburgh, United Kingdom	Clay	(United Kingdom) Julie Pullin	(United Kingdom) Helen Crook (United Kingdom) Victoria Davies	6–2, 6–1
Win	27.	4 June 2001	Surbiton Trophy, United Kingdom	Grass	(United Kingdom) Julie Pullin	(South Africa) Kim Grant (United States) Lilia Osterloh	7–6^{(3)}, 7–5
Loss	22.	19 March 2002	ITF La Cañada, United States	Hard	(United Kingdom) Julie Pullin	(South Africa) Kim Grant (United States) Abigail Spears	6–4, 5–7, 1–6
Loss	23.	12 May 2002	Fukuoka International, Japan	Grass	(United Kingdom) Julie Pullin	(Japan) Shinobu Asagoe (South Korea) Cho Yoon-jeong	2–6, 4–6
Win	28.	9 June 2002	ITF Surbiton, United Kingdom	Grass	(United Kingdom) Julie Pullin	(South Africa) Nannie de Villiers (Kazakhstan) Irina Selyutina	6–2, 6–2

== Post-retirement life ==
After retiring from professional tennis, Woodroffe was one of the founders of WimX Tennis, a tennis academy and coaching business. As of 2021, she is still coaching there.
