= Claire Taylor (tennis) =

British tennis player

- Country (sports): United Kingdom
- Born: 17 February 1975 (age 50); Banbury, England
- Plays: Left-handed
- Prize money: $77,207

Singles
- Career titles: 2 ITF
- Highest ranking: No. 183 (24 June 1997)

Grand Slam singles results
- Wimbledon: 2R (1996)

Doubles
- Career titles: 3 ITF
- Highest ranking: No. 184 (23 December 1996)

Grand Slam doubles results
- Wimbledon: 1R (1993, 1994, 1997)

Claire Shepherd (born 17 February 1975) is a British former professional tennis player. She competed during her career as Claire Taylor.

A left-handed player from Oxfordshire, Taylor reached a best ranking of 183 in the world during her career.

Taylor made three singles appearances in the main draw of Wimbledon, the first in 1994 when she came up against Martina Navratilova. She won through to the second round once, in 1996, after beating Joanne Ward in a match between two British wildcards.

== ITF finals ==
=== Singles: 6 (2–4) ===
Result	No.	Date	Tournament	Surface	Opponent	Score
Win	1.	31 January 1994	Telford, United Kingdom	Hard	(United Kingdom) Ekaterina Roubanova	6–3, 6–0
Loss	1.	9 May 1994	Bracknell, United Kingdom	Hard	(South Africa) Nannie de Villiers	2–6, 2–6
Loss	2.	31 July 1995	Ilkley, United Kingdom	Grass	(United Kingdom) Kate Warne-Holland	6–4, 4–6, 6–7^{(6–8)}
Loss	3.	10 October 1995	Telford, United Kingdom	Hard	(Netherlands) Amanda Hopmans	4–6, 3–6
Win	2.	15 January 1996	Woodlands, United States	Hard	(Israel) Hila Rosen	6–3, 7–6^{(7–5)}
Loss	4.	10 February 1997	Birmingham, United Kingdom	Hard	(United Kingdom) Shirli-Ann Siddall	4–6, 4–6

=== Doubles: 7 (3–4) ===
Result	No.	Date	Tournament	Surface	Partner	Opponents	Score
Loss	1.	3 May 1993	Bracknell, United Kingdom	Hard	(United Kingdom) Lorna Woodroffe	(Russia) Natalia Egorova (Russia) Svetlana Parkhomenko	6–7, 1–6
Win	1.	4 April 1994	Harare, Zimbabwe	Hard	(United Kingdom) Kate Warne-Holland	(United Kingdom) Michele Mair (South Africa) Karen van der Merwe	6–4, 3–6, 6–3
Loss	2.	May 1995	Edinburgh, United Kingdom	Clay	(United Kingdom) Kaye Hand	(United Kingdom) Karen Cross (United Kingdom) Lizzie Jelfs	6–3, 3–6, 0–6
Loss	3.	May 1995	Lee-on-the-Solent, United Kingdom	Clay	(United Kingdom) Kaye Hand	(Australia) Robyn Mawdsley (Russia) Natalia Egorova	6–7^{(0–7)}, 2–6
Loss	4.	31 March 1996	Caen, France	Clay	(United Kingdom) Amanda Wainwright	(Sweden) Annica Lindstedt (Sweden) Anna-Karin Svensson	4–6, 6–7
Win	2.	15 April 1996	Elvas, Portugal	Hard	(South Africa) Tessa Price	(Finland) Hanna-Katri Aalto (Finland) Kirsi Lampinen	6–2, 6–3
Win	3.	29 April 1996	Guimarães, Portugal	Hard	(Sweden) Kristina Triska	(United States) Jennifer Poulos (China) Jody Yin	7–5, 6–3
