= Evelyn Fauth =

Austrian tennis player

- Country (sports): Austria
- Born: 27 November 1976 (age 49) Sankt Peter, Austria
- Height: 168 cm (5 ft 6 in)
- Plays: Right-handed
- Prize money: $201,106

Singles
- Career record: 278–263
- Career titles: 5 ITF
- Highest ranking: No. 127 (20 May 2002)

Grand Slam singles results
- US Open: 2R (2001)

Doubles
- Career record: 44–62
- Career titles: 1 ITF
- Highest ranking: No. 303 (16 October 2000)

Evelyn Fauth (born 27 November 1976) is a former professional tennis player from Austria.

== Biography ==
Fauth was born in the Styrian town of Sankt Peter, to parents Walter and Ingrid. She began playing tennis at the age of six and turned professional at 17.

Her biggest title win was the Espinho ITF tournament in 1999, which included a semifinal win over Kim Clijsters.

She appeared as a qualifier at the 2001 US Open and defeated Anne-Gaëlle Sidot to reach the second round, where she lost in three sets to Virginia Ruano Pascual.

In 2002, she debuted for the Austria Fed Cup team in a surprise win over the United States, away from home in Charlotte, North Carolina in the first round of the World Group. Prior to the tie, American star Jennifer Capriati was dismissed from the team for not complying with team rules, meaning that Fauth received a walkover win in the scheduled second match, giving Austria a 2–0 lead with Barbara Schwartz having already put them ahead by winning the opener. Schwartz then secured the tie for Austria in the third match, after which Fauth featured in two dead rubbers. She played a singles match against Monica Seles and partnered with Marion Maruska in the doubles rubber, losing both, to leave the scoreline at 3–2 in Austria's favour. Barbara Schett returned to the team for the quarterfinals, which left Fauth on the sidelines. Austria ultimately reached the semifinals.

She played two further Fed Cup ties in 2003, against Belgium away in Bree and Canada at home in Neudorfl.

Since retiring she remained involved in tennis as a coach. She was named Styria's "Coach of the Year" in 2015.

== ITF Circuit finals ==
$25,000 tournaments
$10,000 tournaments

=== Singles (5–7) ===
Outcome	No.	Date	Tournament	Surface	Opponent	Score
Runner-up	1.	6 February 1994	ITF İstanbul, Turkey	Hard	(Hungary) Barbara Báthory	1–6, 2–6
Winner	1.	28 January 1996	ITF İstanbul, Turkey	Hard	(Switzerland) Andrea Schwarz	7–6^{(7–5)}, 6–1
Winner	2.	28 July 1996	ITF Dublin, Ireland	Clay	(United States) Pam Nelson	6–2, 6–3
Runner-up	2.	26 January 1997	ITF İstanbul, Turkey	Hard	(Germany) Meike Fröhlich	2–6, 2–6
Runner-up	3.	22 June 1997	ITF Klosters, Switzerland	Clay	(Switzerland) Miroslava Vavrinec	6–4, 5–7, 2–6
Winner	3.	13 July 1997	ITF Fiumicino, Italy	Clay	(Italy) Alessia Lombardi	6–3, 6–4
Winner	4.	21 June 1998	ITF Grado, Italy	Clay	(Romania) Andreea Vanc	6–7^{(4–7)}, 6–1, 6–1
Winner	5.	26 April 1999	ITF Espinho, Portugal	Clay	(Spain) Mariam Ramón Climent	6–3, 4–6, 7–5
Runner-up	4.	8 May 2000	ITF Midlothian, Canada	Clay	(Colombia) Catalina Castaño	3–6, 5–7
Runner-up	5.	17 September 2000	ITF Sofia, Bulgaria	Clay	(Bulgaria) Antoaneta Pandjerova	5–7, 4–6
Runner-up	6.	18 March 2002	ITF Juarez, Mexico	Clay	(Spain) María Sánchez Lorenzo	6–4, 2–6, 1–6
Runner-up	7.	21 April 2002	ITF Jackson, United States	Clay	(Argentina) Gisela Dulko	7–5, 1–6, 3–6

=== Doubles (1–1) ===
Outcome	No.	Date	Tournament	Surface	Partner	Opponents	Score
Runner-up	1.	3 April 1994	ITF Gaborone, Botswana	Hard	(Czech Republic) Radka Surová	(Netherlands) Amanda Hopmans (Spain) Magüi Serna	3–6, 1–6
Winner	1.	27 November 1995	ITF Salzburg, Austria	Carpet (i)	(Austria) Barbara Schwartz	(Czech Republic) Milena Nekvapilová (Czech Republic) Sylva Nesvadbová	6–7^{(1–7)}, 7–6^{(8–6)}, 6–3
