= Kirsi Lampinen =

Finnish tennis player

- Country (sports): Finland
- Born: 19 January 1972 (age 53); Turku, Finland
- Prize money: $9,472

Singles
- Career record: 16–41
- Highest ranking: No. 640 (5 October 1998)

Doubles
- Career record: 49–47
- Career titles: 2 ITF
- Highest ranking: No. 331 (14 April 1997)

Team competitions
- Fed Cup: 5–10

Kirsi Lampinen (born 19 January 1972) is a Finnish former professional tennis player.

== Biography ==
Born in Turku, Lampinen competed on the professional tour in the late 1990s. She won two doubles titles on the ITF Women's Circuit, both partnering Fed Cup teammate Hanna-Katri Aalto.

Lampinen represented the Finland Fed Cup team in a total of 14 ties, between 1997 and 2001. She then served as team captain for Finland in 2002.

As of 2018 she coaches tennis full-time at the Rovaniemi Volleyball Club in Lapland.

== ITF finals ==
=== Doubles (2–7) ===
Outcome	No.	Date	Tournament	Surface	Partner	Opponents	Score
Runner-up	1.	25 September 1995	Antalya, Turkey	Hard	(United States) Susan Bowman	(Czech Republic) Pavlína Bartůňková (Turkey) İpek Şenoğlu	5–7, 4–6
Runner-up	2.	15 April 1996	Elvas, Portugal	Hard	(Finland) Hanna-Katri Aalto	(United Kingdom) Claire Taylor (South Africa) Tessa Price	2–6, 3–6
Winner	1.	22 April 1996	Azeméis, Portugal	Hard	(Finland) Hanna-Katri Aalto	(France) Kildine Chevalier (Sweden) Kristina Triska	6–0, 6–2
Runner-up	3.	16 June 1997	Tallinn, Estonia	Hard	(Hungary) Nóra Köves	(Germany) Magdalena Kučerová (Germany) Gabriela Kučerová	4–6, 1–6
Runner-up	4.	7 July 1997	Lohja, Finland	Clay	(Finland) Hanna-Katri Aalto	(Netherlands) Annemarie Mikkers (Sweden) Annica Lindstedt	1–6, 1–6
Runner-up	5.	18 May 1998	Rhodes, Greece	Hard	(Finland) Hanna Puustinen	(Switzerland) Diane Asensio (Germany) Jennifer Tinnacher	3–6, 4–6
Runner-up	6.	18 January 1999	Båstad, Sweden	Hard (i)	(Finland) Hanna-Katri Aalto	(Czech Republic) Renata Kučerová (Czech Republic) Blanka Kumbárová	4–6, 3–6
Winner	2.	17 May 1999	Elvas, Portugal	Hard	(Finland) Hanna-Katri Aalto	(Portugal) Ana Catarina Nogueira (Japan) Ayami Takase	6–4, 6–4
Runner-up	7.	21 June 1999	Båstad, Sweden	Clay	(Finland) Hanna-Katri Aalto	(Finland) Minna Rautajoki (Sweden) Maria Wolfbrandt	6–1, 2–6, 4–6
