= Kildine Chevalier =

French tennis player

- Country (sports): France
- Born: 30 June 1980 (age 45) Lyon, France
- Turned pro: 1995
- Retired: 2009
- Plays: Right (two-handed backhand)
- Prize money: $105,209

Singles
- Career record: 246–223
- Career titles: 8 ITF
- Highest ranking: No. 218 (2 February 2004)

Grand Slam singles results
- Australian Open: Q1 (2004)
- French Open: Q1 (1996, 1997, 1998, 2004, 2005)

Doubles
- Career record: 232–135
- Career titles: 22 ITF
- Highest ranking: No. 172 (5 July 2004)

Grand Slam doubles results
- French Open: 1R (2004, 2005)

Kildine Chevalier (born 30 June 1980) is a French former professional tennis player.

Chevalier has a career-high singles ranking by the WTA of 218, achieved on 2 February 2004. She also has a career-high WTA doubles ranking of 172, achieved on 5 July 2004. Chevalier won eight singles and 22 doubles titles on the ITF Circuit.

Chevalier retired from professional tennis in 2009.

== ITF finals ==
$50,000 tournaments
$40,000 tournaments
$25,000 tournaments
$10,000 tournaments

=== Singles (8–6) ===
Result	Date	Tier	Tournament	Surface	Opponent	Score
Loss	31 July 1995	10,000	Rabat, Morocco	Clay	(Netherlands) Annemarie Mikkers	0–6, 6–7^{(10)}
Loss	10 August 1997	10,000	Rebecq, Belgium	Clay	(Bulgaria) Lubomira Bacheva	3–6, 6–4, 3–6
Win	30 November 1998	10,000	Rio de Janeiro, Brazil	Clay	(Argentina) Sabrina Valenti	6–4, 0–6, 6–2
Win	9 September 2002	10,000	Madrid, Spain	Clay	(Spain) María José Sánchez Alayeto	5–7, 6–4, 6–4
Win	17 March 2003	40,000	Monterrey, Mexico	Hard	(Brazil) Maria Fernanda Alves	3–6, 6–0, 6–3
Loss	18 May 2003	10,000	Monzon, Spain	Hard	(Portugal) Frederica Piedade	4–6, 3–6
Win	25 May 2003	10,000	Almeria, Spain	Hard	(Turkey) İpek Şenoğlu	4–6, 6–4, 6–1
Loss	18 August 2003	10,000	San Marino	Clay	(France) Céline Beigbeder	3–6, 1–6
Loss	13 October 2003	25,000	Mexico City	Hard	(Puerto Rico) Vilmarie Castellvi	2–6, 6–4, 6–7^{(4)}
Win	27 October 2003	10,000	Obregón, Mexico	Clay	(Brazil) Jenifer Widjaja	6–0, 6–2
Win	3 November 2003	10,000	Los Mochis, Mexico	Clay	(Hungary) Zsuzsanna Babos	3–6, 6–4, 6–3
Win	18 October 2004	10,000	Aguascalientes, Mexico	Clay	(Argentina) Jorgelina Cravero	6–3, 6–4
Loss	11 April 2005	10,000	Tampico, Mexico	Hard	(United States) Lauren Barnikow	3–6, 3–6
Win	30 August 2005	10,000	Mollerussa, Spain	Hard	(Spain) María José Martínez Sánchez	6–2, 5–7, 6–2

=== Doubles (22–23) ===
Result	No.	Date	Tier	Tournament	Surface	Partner	Opponent	Score
Win	1.	31 July 1995	10,000	Rabat, Morocco	Clay	(Australia) Natalie Frawley	(Netherlands) Marielle Bruens (Netherlands) Annemarie Mikkers	3–6, 7–5, 7–5
Loss	2.	20 November 1995	10,000	Cairo, Egypt	Clay	(Ukraine) Tessa Shapovalova	(Bulgaria) Teodora Nedeva (Bulgaria) Antoaneta Pandjerova	7–5, 3–6, 0–6
Loss	3.	22 April 1996	10,000	Azeméis, Portugal	Hard	(Sweden) Kristina Triska	(Finland) Hanna-Katri Aalto (Finland) Kirsi Lampinen	0–6, 2–6
Loss	4.	21 April 1997	10,000	Guimarães, Portugal	Hard	(Czech Republic) Jindra Gabrisova	(France) Élodie Le Bescond (Tunisia) Selima Sfar	4–6, 2–6
Loss	5.	11 August 1997	10,000	Koksijde, Belgium	Clay	(France) Laetitia Sanchez	(Sweden) Annica Lindstedt (Netherlands) Annemarie Mikkers	1–6, 5–7
Win	6.	23 November 1998	10,000	São Paulo, Brazil	Clay	(Slovakia) Silvia Uríčková	(Paraguay) Laura Bernal (Argentina) Paula Racedo	6–3, 7–6^{(7)}
Win	7.	30 November 1998	10,000	Rio de Janeiro, Brazil	Clay	(Slovakia) Silvia Uríčková	(Brazil) Joana Cortez (Argentina) Sabrina Valenti	6–2, 3–6, 6–3
Loss	8.	23 October 2000	25,000	Saint-Raphaël, France	Hard (i)	(Netherlands) Susanne Trik	(Spain) Ainhoa Goñi (Spain) Nuria Llagostera Vives	1–4, 4–5^{(5)}, 1–3 ret.
Loss	9.	8 July 2001	10,000	Périgueux, France	Clay	(Uruguay) Daniela Olivera	(Latvia) Līga Dekmeijere (Estonia) Margit Rüütel	4–6, 1–6
Win	10.	13 August 2001	10,000	Aosta, Italy	Clay	(Madagascar) Natacha Randriantefy	(Austria) Stefanie Haidner (Argentina) Luciana Masante	1–6, 6–2, 6–2
Win	11.	20 August 2001	10,000	Westende, Belgium	Clay	(Belarus) Evgenia Subbotina	(Ukraine) Oleksandra Kravets (Spain) Arantxa Parra Santonja	7–5, 7–5
Win	12.	10 September 2001	10,000	Madrid, Spain	Clay	(France) Stéphanie Cohen-Aloro	(Spain) Sonia Delgado (Italy) Anna Floris	2–6, 6–2, 6–2
Win	13.	21 January 2002	10,000	Grenoble, France	Hard (i)	(Madagascar) Natacha Randriantefy	(France) Karla Mraz (France) Aurélie Védy	6–4, 6–4
Win	14.	9 July 2002	10,000	Sezze, Italy	Clay	(France) Aurélie Védy	(Israel) Yevgenia Savransky (Slovakia) Martina Babáková	6–3, 7–5
Win	15.	5 August 2002	10,000	Vigo, Spain	Hard	(Germany) Caroline-Ann Basu	(Spain) Laura Figuerola (Spain) María Pilar Sánchez Alayeto	6–2, 6–1
Win	16.	2 September 2002	10,000	Mollerussa, Spain	Hard	(Germany) Caroline-Ann Basu	(Spain) Núria Roig (Spain) Laura Vallverdu-Zaira	6–3, 3–6, 7–6^{(5)}
Win	17.	7 October 2002	10,000	Catania, Italy	Clay	(New Zealand) Shelley Stephens	(Austria) Susanne Filipp (Portugal) Neuza Silva	6–2, 6–2
Loss	18.	5 November 2002	10,000	Villenave-d'Ornon, France	Clay (i)	(Madagascar) Natacha Randriantefy	(Austria) Bianca Kamper (Austria) Nicole Remis	3–6, 4–6
Loss	19.	10 February 2003	10,000	Albufeira, Portugal	Hard	(United Kingdom) Anna Hawkins	(Italy) Silvia Disderi (Italy) Giulia Meruzzi	2–6, 4–6
Loss	20.	5 March 2003	40,000	Nuevo Laredo, Mexico	Hard	(Germany) Caroline-Ann Basu	(United Kingdom) Helen Crook (Greece) Christina Zachariadou	3–6, 6–4, 2–6
Loss	21.	17 March 2003	40,000	Monterrey, Mexico	Hard	(Germany) Caroline-Ann Basu	(United Kingdom) Helen Crook (Greece) Christina Zachariadou	2–6, 0–6
Win	22.	17 March 2003	40,000	Monterrey, Mexico	Hard	(Germany) Caroline-Ann Basu	(Brazil) Joana Cortez (Brazil) Carla Tiene	6–4, 3–6, 7–5
Loss	23.	14 April 2003	25,000	San Luis Potosí, Mexico	Clay	(Croatia) Lana Popadić	(Argentina) Jorgelina Cravero (Argentina) Vanina García Sokol	1–6, 3–6
Loss	24.	18 May 2003	10,000	Monzón, Spain	Clay	(Romania) Liana Ungur	(Ukraine) Olena Antypina (Russia) Raissa Gourevitch	6–3, 5–7, 1–6
Loss	25.	29 June 2003	25,000	Mont-de-Marsan, France	Clay	(Greece) Christina Zachariadou	(Spain) Paula García (Spain) María José Martínez Sánchez	4–6, 5–7
Loss	26.	20 July 2003	25,000	Les Contamines, France	Hard	(Ukraine) Oleksandra Kravets	(France) Caroline Dhenin (Germany) Bianka Lamade	4–6, 2–6
Win	27.	28 July 2003	10,000	Gardone Val Trompia, Italy	Clay	(Italy) Silvia Disderi	(Austria) Daniela Klemenschits (Austria) Sandra Klemenschits	6–4, 6–2
Loss	28.	18 August 2003	10,000	San Marino	Clay	(Greece) Christina Zachariadou	(Romania) Oana Elena Golimbioschi (France) Aurélie Védy	6–2, 6–7^{(7)}, 4–6
Win	29.	27 October 2003	10,000	Obregón, Mexico	Clay	(Argentina) Melisa Arévalo	(Uruguay) Ana Lucía Migliarini de León (Mexico) Daniela Múñoz Gallegos	1–6, 6–2, 6–4
Win	30.	25 January 2004	25,000	Bergamo, Italy	Carpet (i)	(Italy) Alberta Brianti	(Croatia) Iva Majoli (Croatia) Sanda Mamić	6–4, 6–4
Win	31.	8 February 2004	10,000	Vale do Lobo, Portugal	Clay	(Portugal) Frederica Piedade	(Argentina) Soledad Esperón (Argentina) Flavia Mignola	2–6, 6–3, 6–4
Loss	32.	15 February 2004	10,000	Albufeira, Portugal	Clay	(Portugal) Frederica Piedade	(Czech Republic) Zuzana Černá (Czech Republic) Vladimíra Uhlířová	7–6^{(7–4)}, 4–6, 5–7
Loss	33.	7 June 2004	50,000	Marseille, France	Clay	(Spain) Conchita Martínez Granados	(Israel) Shahar Peer (Russia) Elena Vesnina	1–6, 1–6
Loss	34.	6 September 2004	25,000	Madrid, Spain	Hard	(Spain) Marta Fraga	(Sweden) Hanna Nooni (Finland) Emma Laine	3–6, 6–7^{(3)}
Loss	35.	13 September 2004	10,000	Lleida, Spain	Clay	(Portugal) Neuza Silva	(Italy) Elena Vianello (Italy) Elisa Villa	5–7, 5–7
Win	36.	11 October 2004	25,000	Mexico City	Hard	(Czech Republic) Olga Vymetálková	(Brazil) Larissa Carvalho (Brazil) Jenifer Widjaja	6–3, 6–2
Win	37.	7 November 2004	10,000	Le Havre, France	Clay (i)	(France) Mailyne Andrieux	(Russia) Maria Arkhipova (Czech Republic) Janette Bejlková	7–5, 6–7^{(2)}, 6–4
Loss	38.	5 April 2005	25,000	Coatzacoalcos, Mexico	Hard	(Argentina) Jorgelina Cravero	(Ukraine) Mariya Koryttseva (Hungary) Rita Kuti-Kis	2–6, 3–6
Win	39.	11 April 2005	10,000	Tampico, Mexico	Hard	(Argentina) Jorgelina Cravero	(Argentina) Andrea Benítez (Argentina) Flavia Mignola	7–6^{(6)}, 2–6, 7–5
Win	40.	19 April 2005	25,000	Valencia, Spain	Hard	(France) Stéphanie Foretz	(Spain) Rosa María Andrés Rodríguez (Spain) Arantxa Parra Santonja	4–6, 7–6^{(5)}, 6–2
Loss	41.	11 January 2006	10,000	Stuttgart, Germany	Hard (i)	(France) Julie Coin	(Croatia) Darija Jurak (Czech Republic) Renata Voráčová	2–6, 1–6
Loss	42.	8 August 2006	10,000	Jesi, Italy	Clay	(Italy) Elena Vianello	(Austria) Stefanie Haidner (France) Anaïs Laurendon	0–6, 3–6
Win	43.	21 August 2006	10,000	Trecastagni, Italy	Hard	(Italy) Giulia Meruzzi	(Italy) Alice Balducci (Switzerland) Lisa Sabino	4–6, 6–3, 6–3
Loss	44.	18 September 2006	25,000	Lecce, Italy	Clay	(Italy) Adriana Serra Zanetti	(France) Ekaterina Lopes (Serbia) Teodora Mirčić	6–7^{(4)}, 4–6
Win	45.	3 August 2007	10,000	Gardone Val Trompia, Italy	Clay	(Italy) Alice Balducci	(Italy) Anastasia Grymalska (Russia) Valeria Savinykh	3–6, 7–6^{(5)}, 6–3

== Junior Grand Slam finals ==
=== Girls' singles: 1 (runner-up) ===
Result	Year	Championship	Surface	Opponent	Score
Loss	1997	US Open	Hard	(Zimbabwe) Cara Black	7–6^{(5)}, 1–6, 3–6
