= Ayami Takase =

Japanese tennis player (born 1978)

- Country (sports): Japan
- Born: 13 December 1978 (age 46)
- Prize money: $106,153

Singles
- Career record: 190–206
- Career titles: 1 ITF
- Highest ranking: No. 250 (4 April 2005)

Doubles
- Career record: 162–145
- Career titles: 5 ITF
- Highest ranking: No. 152 (2 October 2006)

Ayami Takase (高瀬 礼美, Takase Ayami, born 13 December 1978) is a former professional tennis player from Japan.

She made the round of 16 at the China Open in 2002, as a lucky loser from qualifying. Takase reached a best singles ranking of 250 in the world.

As a doubles player on the WTA Tour she featured in the main draw of four editions of the Japan Open and was a quarterfinalist at the 2004 Korea Open. Her five ITF doubles titles include a $50k event in Tokyo in 2006.

== ITF finals ==
Legend
$50,000 tournaments
$25,000 tournaments
$10,000 tournaments

=== Singles (1–5) ===
Result	No.	Date	Location	Surface	Opponent	Score
Loss	1.	4 October 1998	Kugayama, Japan	Carpet (i)	(Australia) Alicia Molik	2–6, 3–6
Loss	2.	28 November 1999	Kōfu, Japan	Carpet	(Japan) Sachie Umehara	5–7, 0–6
Loss	3.	18 May 2003	Nagano, Japan	Grass	(Japan) Rika Fujiwara	5–7, 0–6
Loss	4.	25 May 2003	Gunma, Japan	Grass	(Japan) Maika Ozaki	2–6, 4–6
Win	1.	4 April 2004	Obregón, Mexico	Hard	(United States) Sarah Riske	7–6^{(7–5)}, 6–2
Loss	5.	17 July 2004	Gunma, Japan	Carpet	(Japan) Rika Fujiwara	1–6, 2–6

=== Doubles (5–23) ===
Result	No.	Date	Tournament	Surface	Partner	Opponents	Score
Win	1.	4 November 1996	Manila, Philippines	Hard	(Japan) Yoriko Yamagishi	(South Korea) Won Kyung-joo (Malaysia) Khoo Chin-bee	6–3, 6–4
Loss	1.	7 June 1998	Antalya, Turkey	Hard	(Russia) Marina Samoilenko	(Finland) Hanna-Katri Aalto (Finland) Minna Rautajoki	2–6, 4–6
Win	2.	17 August 1998	Carrabba, Italy	Clay	(Russia) Ekaterina Sysoeva	(Australia) Mireille Dittmann (Australia) Natalie Dittmann	6–2, 6–0
Loss	2.	4 October 1998	Kyoto, Japan	Hard	(Japan) Shizu Katsumi	(Australia) Alicia Molik (Australia) Bryanne Stewart	6–3, 3–6, 4–6
Loss	3.	17 May 1999	Elvas, Portugal	Hard	(Portugal) Ana Catarina Nogueira	(Finland) Hanna-Katri Aalto (Finland) Kirsi Lampinen	4–6, 4–6
Win	3.	6 August 2000	Alghero, Italy	Clay	(Hong Kong) Tong Ka-po	(Italy) Alice Canepa (Italy) Valentina Sassi	3–6, 6–3, 6–1
Loss	4.	13 August 2000	Bath, United Kingdom	Clay	(Australia) Jenny Belobrajdic	(South Africa) Mareze Joubert (Australia) Nicole Sewell	2–6, 2–6
Loss	5.	28 January 2001	Jersey, United Kingdom	Hard	(United States) Kristy Blumberg	(United Kingdom) Nicola Payne (United Kingdom) Nicola Woodhouse	6–4, 2–6, 2–6
Loss	6.	14 April 2002	Ho Chi Minh City, Vietnam	Hard	(Japan) Remi Tezuka	(China) Yan Zi (China) Zheng Jie	1–6, 6–1, 2–6
Loss	7.	19 October 2003	Haibara, Japan	Carpet	(Japan) Tomoko Yonemura	(Japan) Shiho Hisamatsu (South Korea) Jeon Mi-ra	2–6, 7–5, 3–6
Loss	8.	28 March 2004	Monterrey, Mexico	Hard	(Venezuela) Stephanie Schaer	(United States) Katie Granson (United States) Sarah Riske	6–4, 5–7, 1–6
Loss	9.	4 April 2004	Ciudad Obregón, Mexico	Hard	(Venezuela) Stephanie Schaer	(Argentina) Soledad Esperón (Argentina) Flavia Mignola	6–2, 4–6, 4–6
Loss	10.	6 June 2004	Changwon, South Korea	Hard	(Japan) Tomoko Yonemura	(South Korea) Chang Kyung-mi (South Korea) Kim Jin-hee	5–7, 4–6
Loss	11.	17 July 2004	Gunma, Japan	Carpet	(Japan) Kaori Aoyama	(Japan) Tomoko Yonemura (Japan) Mayumi Yamamoto	4–6, 6–4, 3–6
Win	4.	7 November 2004	Sutama, Japan	Clay	(Japan) Kaori Aoyama	(Japan) Tomoko Dokei (Japan) Yukiko Yabe	6–4, 6–3
Loss	12.	30 January 2005	Waikoloa, United States	Hard	(Australia) Lauren Breadmore	(United States) Natalie Grandin (United States) Kaysie Smashey	3–6, 4–6
Loss	13.	1 May 2005	Hamanako, Japan	Hard	(Japan) Shiho Hisamatsu	(Japan) Ryōko Fuda (Japan) Seiko Okamoto	5–7, 4–6
Loss	14.	31 May 2005	Gunma, Japan	Hard	(Japan) Mayumi Yamamoto	(Chinese Taipei) Hsieh Su-wei (Chinese Taipei) Chan Chin-wei	2–6, 1–1 ret.
Loss	15.	25 September 2005	Ibaraki, Japan	Hard	(South Korea) Jeon Mi-ra	(Japan) Ryoko Takemura (Japan) Tomoko Yonemura	2–6, 4–6
Loss	16.	23 October 2005	Makinohara, Japan	Carpet	(Japan) Seiko Okamoto	(Japan) Ryoko Takemura (Japan) Tomoko Yonemura	4–6, 3–6
Loss	17.	6 November 2005	Busan, Korea	Hard	(Japan) Seiko Okamoto	(Russia) Julia Efremova (Indonesia) Wynne Prakusya	4–6, 7–6^{(6)}, 1–6
Loss	18.	12 February 2006	Sunderland, United Kingdom	Hard (i)	(South Africa) Surina De Beer	(Netherlands) Kim Kilsdonk (Netherlands) Elise Tamaëla	5–7, 4–6
Loss	19.	11 April 2006	Jackson, United States	Clay	(Japan) Seiko Okamoto	(Russia) Maria Kondratieva (France) Sophie Lefèvre	0–6, 3–6
Loss	20.	9 July 2006	Nagoya, Japan	Hard	(Japan) Seiko Okamoto	(Chinese Taipei) Chuang Chia-jung (Japan) Shiho Hisamatsu	2–6, 3–6
Loss	21.	16 July 2006	Miyazaki, Japan	Hard	(Japan) Seiko Okamoto	(Japan) Maki Arai (Japan) Kumiko Iijima	2–6, 3–6
Loss	22.	23 July 2006	Kurume, Japan	Carpet	(Japan) Seiko Okamoto	(Chinese Taipei) Latisha Chan (Chinese Taipei) Chuang Chia-jung	w/o
Loss	23.	28 August 2006	Guangzhou, China	Hard	(Thailand) Montinee Tangphong	(China) Chen Yanchong (China) Ren Jing	6–2, 4–6, 5–7
Win	5.	29 September 2006	Tokyo, Japan	Hard	(Latvia) Līga Dekmeijere	(Japan) Yurika Sema (Japan) Mari Tanaka	7–6^{(3)}, 6–3
