= Annemarie Mikkers =

Dutch tennis player

- Country (sports): Netherlands
- Born: 13 May 1973 (age 51)
- Prize money: $22,473

Singles
- Career record: 65–73
- Career titles: 1 ITF
- Highest ranking: No. 461 (5 February 1996)

Doubles
- Career record: 79–61
- Career titles: 6 ITF
- Highest ranking: No. 223 (29 April 1996)

Annemarie Mikkers (born 13 May 1973) is a Dutch former professional tennis player.

Mikkers reached a best singles ranking of world No. 461, with her only ITF title coming at Rabat in 1995. She achieved a career-high ranking of 223 in doubles and featured in the doubles main-draw in three editions of the Rosmalen WTA Tour tournament. On the ITF Circuit, Mikkers won a total of six doubles titles, including a $25k tournament in Rheda-Wiedenbrück.

== ITF finals ==
$25,000 tournaments
$10,000 tournaments

=== Singles (1–0) ===
Result	No.	Date	Location	Surface	Opponent	Score
Win	1.	31 July 1995	Rabat, Morocco	Clay	(France) Kildine Chevalier	6–0, 7–6^{(10)}

=== Doubles (6–8) ===
Result	No.	Date	Location	Surface	Partner	Opponents	Score
Loss	1.	8 June 1992	Oliveira, Portugal	Hard	(Netherlands) Anique Snijders	(Australia) Shareen Bottrell (Australia) Maria Purcell	6–4, 3–6, 2–6
Loss	2.	25 January 1993	Austin, United States	Hard	(Netherlands) Anique Snijders	(United States) Elly Hakami (United States) Anne Mall	7–6^{(4)}, 2–6, 1–6
Loss	3.	5 April 1993	Athens, Greece	Clay	(Netherlands) Sandra van der Aa	(Croatia) Darija Dešković (Slovenia) Karin Lušnic	3–6, 6–7^{(5)}
Loss	4.	5 July 1993	Lohja, Finland	Clay	(Netherlands) Stephanie Gomperts	(Japan) Yuka Yoshida (Japan) Hiroko Mochizuki	2–6, 7–6, 4–6
Win	1.	23 August 1993	Horb, Germany	Clay	(Netherlands) Yvette Basting	(Peru) Lorena Rodriguez (Finland) Katrina Saarinen	4–6, 7–5, 7–5
Win	2.	24 July 1994	Rheda-Wiedenbrück, Germany	Clay	(Netherlands) Seda Noorlander	(Germany) Kirstin Freye (Germany) Angela Kerek	6–3, 6–2
Loss	5.	13 February 1995	Faro, Portugal	Hard	(Netherlands) Marielle Bruens	(Czech Republic) Jindra Gabrišová (Czech Republic) Sabina Raděvičová	4–6, 4–6
Loss	6.	31 July 1995	Rabat, Morocco	Clay	(Netherlands) Marielle Bruens	(Australia) Natalie Frawley (France) Kildine Chevalier	6–3, 5–7, 5–7
Win	3.	15 January 1996	Pontevedra, Spain	Hard	(Netherlands) Henriëtte van Aalderen	(France) Laurence Bois (Italy) Emanuela Brusati	6–2, 6–2
Win	4.	29 January 1996	Orense, Spain	Hard	(Netherlands) Henriëtte van Aalderen	(Belarus) Olga Glouschenko (Belarus) Tatiana Poutchek	6–1, 6–3
Loss	7.	18 August 1996	Nicolosi, Italy	Hard	(Netherlands) Franke Joosten	(Czech Republic) Lucie Steflová (Czech Republic) Magdalena Zděnovcová	3–6, 4–6
Win	5.	7 July 1997	Lohja, Finland	Clay	(Sweden) Annica Lindstedt	(Finland) Hanna-Katri Aalto (Finland) Kirsi Lampinen	6–1, 6–1
Loss	8.	4 August 1997	Rebecq, Belgium	Clay	(Sweden) Annica Lindstedt	(Netherlands) Kim Kilsdonk (Netherlands) Jolanda Mens	3–6, 4–6
Win	6.	11 August 1997	Koksijde, Belgium	Clay	(Sweden) Annica Lindstedt	(France) Kildine Chevalier (France) Laetitia Sanchez	6–1, 7–5
