= Meike Fröhlich =

German tennis player

- ITF name: Meike Froehlich
- Country (sports): Germany
- Born: 10 July 1979 (age 45)
- Prize money: $27,741

Singles
- Career record: 81–64
- Career titles: 3 ITF
- Highest ranking: No. 227 (26 Jan 1998)

Doubles
- Career record: 19–17
- Career titles: 1 ITF
- Highest ranking: No. 286 (2 Aug 1999)

Meike Fröhlich (born 10 July 1979) is a German former professional tennis player.

Fröhlich reached a career high singles ranking of 227 in the world while competing on the professional tour and won three ITF titles, including a $25,000 event at Valladolid in 1997. She featured in the qualifying draw for the 1999 Budapest Open, losing in the first round to Adriana Serra Zanetti.

== ITF finals ==
$25,000 tournaments
$10,000 tournaments

=== Singles: 6 (3–3) ===
Result	No.	Date	Tournament	Surface	Opponent	Score
Win	1.	26 January 1997	Istanbul, Turkey	Hard	(Austria) Evelyn Fauth	6–2, 6–2
Loss	1.	1 June 1997	Burgas, Bulgaria	Hard	(Italy) Alessia Lombardi	6–4, 4–6, 2–6
Loss	2.	15 June 1997	Velenje, Slovenia	Clay	(Hungary) Anna Földényi	1–6, 1–6
Win	2.	27 July 1997	Valladolid, Spain	Clay	(Belgium) Daphne van de Zande	6–3, 4–6, 6–2
Win	3.	10 May 1998	Quartu Sant'Elena, Italy	Hard	(Belgium) Patty Van Acker	6–4, 3–6, 6–1
Loss	3.	2 August 1998	Pamplona, Spain	Hard	(Slovenia) Petra Rampre	2–6, 6–7^{(3)}

=== Doubles: 4 (1–3) ===
Result	No.	Date	Tournament	Surface	Partner	Opponents	Score
Win	1.	25 August 1996	Bad Nauheim, Germany	Clay	(Bulgaria) Pavlina Nola	(Slovakia) Simona Galikova (Slovakia) Patrícia Marková	7–6^{(4)}, 7–6^{(10)}
Loss	1.	1 June 1997	Burgas, Bulgaria	Hard	(Croatia) Kristina Pojatina	(Bulgaria) Pavlina Nola (Bulgaria) Teodora Nedeva	1–6, 2–6
Loss	2.	2 August 1998	Pamplona, Spain	Hard	(Tunisia) Selima Sfar	(Spain) Eva Bes (Netherlands) Amanda Hopmans	w/o
Loss	3.	25 July 1999	Valladolid, Spain	Hard	(Czech Republic) Lenka Cenková	(Netherlands) Debby Haak (Netherlands) Andrea van den Hurk	6–2, 3–6, 6–7
