= Hanna-Katri Aalto =

Finnish tennis player

- Country (sports): Finland
- Born: 24 May 1978 (age 46)
- Prize money: $11,917

Singles
- Career record: 45–45
- Highest ranking: No. 492 (12 October 1998)

Doubles
- Career record: 45–35
- Career titles: 3 ITF
- Highest ranking: No. 362 (13 May 1996)

Hanna-Katri Aalto (born 24 May 1978) is a Finnish former professional tennis player.

Aalto, who was raised in the town of Kajaani, competed on the professional tour in the late 1990s. Retiring in 2000, she then played a year of college tennis in the United States for the University of Mississippi.

Between 1995 and 2000, Aalto represented the Finland Fed Cup team in a total of 20 ties, winning ten singles and three doubles rubbers. Her best ranked singles opponent beaten was Britain's Julie Pullin in 2000.

== ITF finals ==
=== Doubles: 8 (3–5) ===
Outcome	No.	Date	Tournament	Surface	Partner	Opponents	Score
Runner-up	1.	21 April 1996	Elvas, Portugal	Hard	(Finland) Kirsi Lampinen	(United Kingdom) Claire Taylor (South Africa) Tessa Price	2–6, 3–6
Winner	1.	28 April 1996	Azeméis, Portugal	Hard	(Finland) Kirsi Lampinen	(France) Kildine Chevalier (Sweden) Kristina Triska	6–0, 6–2
Runner-up	2.	6 July 1997	Lohja, Finland	Clay	(Finland) Kirsi Lampinen	(Netherlands) Annemarie Mikkers (Sweden) Annica Lindstedt	1–6, 1–6
Winner	2.	7 June 1998	Antalya, Turkey	Hard	(Finland) Minna Rautajoki	(Japan) Ayami Takase (Russia) Marina Samoilenko	6–2, 6–4
Runner-up	3.	24 January 1999	Båstad, Sweden	Hard (i)	(Finland) Kirsi Lampinen	(Czech Republic) Renata Kučerová (Czech Republic) Blanka Kumbárová	4–6, 3–6
Winner	3.	23 May 1999	Elvas, Portugal	Hard	(Finland) Kirsi Lampinen	(Portugal) Ana Catarina Nogueira (Japan) Ayami Takase	6–4, 6–4
Runner-up	4.	27 June 1999	Båstad, Sweden	Clay	(Finland) Kirsi Lampinen	(Finland) Minna Rautajoki (Sweden) Maria Wolfbrandt	6–1, 2–6, 4–6
Runner-up	5.	8 August 1999	Périgueux, France	Clay	(Japan) Rika Fujiwara	(Tunisia) Selima Sfar (United Kingdom) Jo Ward	4–6, 3–6
