= Hiroko Mochizuki =

Japanese tennis player (born 1975)

- Country (sports): Japan
- Born: 23 July 1975 (age 49)
- Plays: Right-handed
- Prize money: $62,369

Singles
- Highest ranking: No. 257 (22 July 1996)

Grand Slam singles results
- Wimbledon: Q1 (1994)

Doubles
- Career titles: 7 ITF
- Highest ranking: No. 161 (9 August 1999)

Grand Slam doubles results
- Wimbledon: Q2 (1997)

Hiroko Mochizuki (born 23 July 1975) is a Japanese former professional tennis player.

As a junior, Mochizuki was ranked in the world's top 10 and was a runner-up in two junior grand slam doubles finals, at the 1993 Wimbledon and 1993 US Open, both partnering Yuka Yoshida.

Mochizuki, a right-handed player, competed on the professional tour from 1993 to 1999. She featured in the occasional WTA Tour event but played mostly in ITF tournaments, where she won seven doubles titles.

== ITF finals ==
$25,000 tournaments
$10,000 tournaments

=== Singles: 1 (0–1) ===
| Result | No. | Date | Tournament | Surface | Opponent | Score |
|---|---|---|---|---|---|---|
| Loss | 1. | 11 October 1993 | ITF Kuroshio, Japan | Hard | (Australia) Catherine Barclay | 6–2, 1–6, 2–6 |

=== Doubles: 14 (7–7) ===
| Result | No. | Date | Tournament | Surface | Partner | Opponents | Score |
|---|---|---|---|---|---|---|---|
| Win | 1. | 12 October 1992 | ITF Tokyo, Japan | Hard | (Japan) Masako Yanagi | (Japan) Yoshiko Sasano (Japan) Yoshiko Wauke | 6–2, 3–6, 6–2 |
| Loss | 1. | 22 June 1992 | Leiria, Portugal | Hard | (Netherlands) Nancy van Erp | (Japan) Emiko Sakaguchi (Japan) Yoriko Yamagishi | 2–6, 5–7 |
| Win | 2. | 5 July 1993 | Lohja, Finland | Clay | (Japan) Yuka Yoshida | (Netherlands) Stephanie Gomperts (Netherlands) Annemarie Mikkers | 6–2, 6–7, 6–4 |
| Win | 3. | 10 October 1993 | Ibaraki, Japan | Hard | (Japan) Yuka Tanaka | (Australia) Maija Avotins (Australia) Lisa McShea | 4–6, 6–3, 7–6 |
| Loss | 2. | 7 March 1994 | Offenbach, Germany | Carpet | (Japan) Yuka Yoshida | (Germany) Sandra Wächtershäuser (Germany) Petra Winzenhöller | 6–7, 3–6 |
| Win | 4. | 20 June 1994 | Valladolid, Spain | Clay | (Japan) Yuka Tanaka | (Netherlands) Hanneke Ketelaars (Czech Republic) Lenka Němečková | 6–0, 4–6, 6–2 |
| Loss | 3. | 24 July 1994 | Salisbury, United States | Hard | (South Africa) Liezel Horn | (South Africa) Mareze Joubert (Greece) Christína Papadáki | 6–3, 1–6, 4–6 |
| Loss | 4. | 29 May 1995 | Sevilla, Spain | Clay | (Japan) Misumi Miyauchi | (Spain) Marta Cano (Spain) Nuria Montero | 7–6^{(4)}, 4–6, 4–6 |
| Loss | 5. | 28 October 1996 | Saga, Japan | Grass | (Japan) Yuka Tanaka | (Australia) Danielle Jones (Thailand) Tamarine Tanasugarn | 2–6, 3–6 |
| Win | 5. | 24 August 1998 | Milan, Italy | Grass | (Japan) Ryoko Takemura | (Croatia) Marijana Kovačević (Italy) Giulia Casoni | 4–6, 7–6^{(5)}, 6–4 |
| Loss | 6. | 6 September 1998 | Spoleto, Italy | Clay | (Japan) Ryoko Takemura | (Croatia) Jelena Kostanić Tošić (Czech Republic) Michaela Paštiková | 3–6, 4–6 |
| Loss | 7. | 15 March 1999 | Seoul, South Korea | Clay | (Japan) Tomoe Hotta | (South Korea) Young-Ja Choi (South Korea) Kim Eun-sook | 4–6, 5–7 |
| Win | 6. | 21 June 1999 | Montreal, Canada | Hard | (Japan) Tomoe Hotta | (Australia) Kylie Hunt (Japan) Riei Kawamata | 6–2, 6–3 |
| Win | 7. | 26 July 1999 | ITF Pamplona, Spain | Hard | (Czech Republic) Ludmila Richterová | (Tunisia) Selima Sfar (United Kingdom) Joanne Ward | 2–6, 6–4, 6–3 |
