= Alessia Lombardi =

Italian tennis player

- Country (sports): Italy
- Born: 24 May 1976 (age 48); Rome, Italy
- Height: 1.75 m (5 ft 9 in)
- Plays: Right-handed
- Prize money: $21,548

Singles
- Career record: 75–57
- Career titles: 2 ITF
- Highest ranking: No. 267 (23 November 1998)

Doubles
- Career record: 31–28
- Career titles: 4 ITF
- Highest ranking: No. 248 (9 November 1998)

Alessia Lombardi (born May 24 1976) is an Italian former professional tennis player.

Born in Rome, Lombardi reached a career-high singles ranking of 267 in the world and won two ITF singles titles.

She fell in the final qualifying round for the 1998 Istanbul Open, but featured in the doubles draw (partnering Gisela Riera), for what was her only WTA Tour main-draw appearance.

== ITF finals ==
Legend
$25,000 tournaments
$10,000 tournaments

=== Singles: 7 (2–5) ===
Result	No.	Date	Tournament	Surface	Opponent	Score
Loss	1.	21 January 1996	ITF Pontevedra, Spain	Hard	(Netherlands) Henriëtte van Aalderen	5–7, 3–6
Loss	2.	28 January 1996	ITF Orense, Spain	Hard	(Greece) Ariadne Katsoulis	6–7^{(2)}, 2–6
Loss	3.	9 February 1997	ITF Sunderland, UK	Hard	(United Kingdom) Lorna Woodroffe	4–6, 6–2, 4–6
Win	1.	1 June 1997	ITF Burgas, Bulgaria	Hard	(Germany) Meike Fröhlich	4–6, 6–4, 6–2
Loss	4.	13 July 1997	ITF Fiumicino, Italy	Clay	(Austria) Evelyn Fauth	3–6, 4–6
Win	2.	14 June 1998	ITF Camucia, Italy	Clay	(Croatia) Maja Palaveršić	6–2, 6–1
Loss	5.	6 July 1998	ITF Fiumicino, Italy	Clay	(Italy) Katia Piccolini	2–6, 6–1, 2–6

=== Doubles: 6 (4–2) ===
Result	No.	Date	Tournament	Surface	Partner	Opponents	Score
Win	1.	24 May 1998	ITF Modena, Italy	Clay	(Italy) Alice Canepa	(Croatia) Marijana Kovačević (Croatia) Kristina Pojatina	6–7^{(5)}, 6–3, 7–5
Loss	1.	31 May 1998	ITF Warsaw, Poland	Clay	(Italy) Alice Canepa	(Czech Republic) Jana Ondrouchová (Czech Republic) Olga Vymetálková	6–7^{(4)}, 4–6
Win	2.	14 June 1998	ITF Camucia, Italy	Clay	(Italy) Alice Canepa	(France) Berengere Karpenschif (Italy) Elena Pioppo	6–3, 6–2
Loss	2.	28 June 1998	ITF Sezze, Italy	Clay	(Italy) Alice Canepa	(France) Vanina Casanova (Tunisia) Selima Sfar	3–6, 1–6
Win	3.	12 July 1998	ITF Fiumicino, Italy	Clay	(Romania) Andreea Ehritt-Vanc	(Hungary) Adrienn Hegedűs (Japan) Tomoe Hotta	6–2, 6–4
Win	4.	16 August 1998	ITF Alghero, Italy	Hard	(Italy) Elena Pioppo	(Italy) Laura Dell'Angelo (Italy) Mara Santangelo	3–6, 6–2, 6–4
