= Joanne Ward =

British tennis player

Jo Ward
- Full name: Joanne Ward
- Country (sports): United Kingdom
- Born: 22 June 1975 (age 50)
- Turned pro: 1994
- Retired: 2007
- Prize money: $138,572

Singles
- Career record: 159–162
- Career titles: 0 WTA, 3 ITF
- Highest ranking: No. 156 (11 February 1998)

Grand Slam singles results
- French Open: Q1 (1998, 1999)
- Wimbledon: 1R (1994, 1996, 1998, 1999, 2000)
- US Open: Q2 (1998, 2000)

Doubles
- Career record: 111–101
- Career titles: 9 ITF
- Highest ranking: No. 180 (15 September 1997)

Grand Slam doubles results
- Wimbledon: 1R (1994, 1997, 1998, 1999)

Joanne Ward (born 22 June 1975) is a British former tennis player.

She competed in five Wimbledon Championships between 1994 and 2000, losing each time in the first round, and has represented the Great Britain Fed Cup team. She was for a time the British number two.

== Career ==
Aged 16, Ward was told she would never play tennis again, after two knee operations. In 1994, she won the UK Tennis National Championships, beating British number one Clare Wood in the semifinals. In the same year, she made her debut at the Wimbledon Championships, losing in the first round to Dominique Monami. She also competed at Wimbledon in 1996, 1998 and 2000, losing first-round matches to Claire Taylor, Karen Cross and Anke Huber respectively. Ward also represented Great Britain in the Fed Cup and the European Championships.

== Post-career ==
In 2004, Ward was one of a number of people who were highly critical of the Lawn Tennis Association, saying that it needed reform. She wanted more individual, tailored coaching.

== ITF finals ==
$100,000 tournaments
$75,000 tournaments
$50,000 tournaments
$25,000 tournaments
$10,000 tournaments

=== Singles: 6 (3–3) ===
Result	No.	Date	Tournament	Surface	Opponent	Score
Win	1.	12 May 1996	Lee-on-Solent, Great Britain	Clay	(United Kingdom) Jasmine Choudhury	7–5, 6–0
Loss	1.	27 April 1997	Bournemouth, Great Britain	Clay	(United Kingdom) Julie Pullin	0–6, 3–6
Loss	2.	14 February 1998	Birmingham, Great Britain	Hard (i)	(United Kingdom) Julie Pullin	1–6, 6–1, 3–6
Win	2.	25 April 1998	Bournemouth, Great Britain	Clay	(United Kingdom) Lucie Ahl	7–6, 6–4
Loss	3.	13 September 1998	Edinburgh, Great Britain	Clay	(Czech Republic) Denisa Chládková	3–6, 2–6
Win	3.	1 August 1999	Pamplona, Spain	Hard	(Germany) Mia Buric	6–2, 6–4

=== Doubles: 15 (9–6) ===
Result	No.	Date	Tournament	Surface	Partner	Opponents	Score
Loss	1.	20 February 1994	Newcastle, Great Britain	Carpet (i)	(Republic of Ireland) Karen Nugent	(Netherlands) Maaike Koutstaal (Netherlands) Linda Niemantsverdriet	6–2, 5–7, 2–6
Loss	2.	31 July 1995	Ilkley, Great Britain	Clay	(United Kingdom) Lucie Ahl	(United Kingdom) Jasmine Choudhury (United Kingdom) Louise Latimer	6–1, 2–6, 2–6
Win	1.	18 February 1996	Sheffield, Great Britain	Hard (i)	(United Kingdom) Lucie Ahl	(United Kingdom) Julie Pullin (United Kingdom) Lorna Woodroffe	7–6, 6–3
Loss	3.	12 May 1996	Lee-on-Solent, Great Britain	Clay	(United Kingdom) Lucie Ahl	(United Kingdom) Shirli-Ann Siddall (United Kingdom) Amanda Wainwright	5–7, 1–6
Win	2.	24 March 1997	Warrnambool, Australia	Grass	(United Kingdom) Lorna Woodroffe	(Australia) Evie Dominikovic (Australia) Amanda Grahame	4–6, 6–4, 6–2
Loss	4.	30 March 1997	Warrnambool, Australia	Grass	(United Kingdom) Lorna Woodroffe	(South Africa) Nannie de Villiers (United Kingdom) Shirli-Ann Siddall	6–3, 2–6, 3–6
Win	3.	4 May 1997	Hatfield, Great Britain	Clay	(United Kingdom) Shirli-Ann Siddall	(United Kingdom) Lucie Ahl (South Africa) Jessica Steck	3–6, 6–4, 7–5
Win	4.	11 May 1997	Lee-on-the-Solent, Great Britain	Clay	(United Kingdom) Shirli-Ann Siddall	(Soviet Union) Natalia Egorova (United States) Rebecca Jensen	6–2, 7–5
Win	5.	19 July 1997	Frinton, Great Britain	Clay	(United Kingdom) Lorna Woodroffe	(United Kingdom) Karen Cross (Soviet Union) Natalia Egorova	6–4, 2–6, 6–0
Win	6.	4 October 1997	Nottingham, Great Britain	Hard	(United Kingdom) Lucie Ahl	(United Kingdom) Karen Cross (United Kingdom) Lizzie Jelfs	6–2, 7–6
Win	7.	16 May 1999	Edinburgh, Great Britain	Clay	(Tunisia) Selima Sfar	(South Africa) Surina De Beer (United Kingdom) Lorna Woodroffe	6–4, 6–2
Loss	5.	31 July 1999	Pamplona, Spain	Hard	(Tunisia) Selima Sfar	(Japan) Hiroko Mochizuki (Czech Republic) Ludmila Richterová	6–2, 4–6, 3–6
Win	8.	6 August 1999	Perigueux, France	Clay	(Tunisia) Selima Sfar	(Finland) Hanna-Katri Aalto (Japan) Rika Fujiwara	6–4, 6–3
Loss	6.	6 February 2000	Jersey, United Kingdom	Hard (i)	(Tunisia) Selima Sfar	(Russia) Elena Bovina (Ukraine) Anna Zaporozhanova	3–6, 2–6
Win	9.	7 May 2000	Hatfield, Great Britain	Clay	(Tunisia) Selima Sfar	(Hungary) Zsófia Gubacsi (Germany) Jasmin Wöhr	7–6^{(8–6)}, 6–2
