= Kristina Triska =

Swedish tennis player

- Country (sports): Sweden
- Born: 6 March 1980 (age 46) Älmhult, Sweden
- Prize money: $69,865

Singles
- Career record: 118–106
- Career titles: 2 ITF
- Highest ranking: 147 (15 September 1997)

Grand Slam singles results
- Australian Open: Q2 (1998)
- French Open: Q1 (1997, 1998)
- Wimbledon: Q2 (1997)
- US Open: Q2 (1997)

Doubles
- Career record: 66–57
- Career titles: 3 ITF
- Highest ranking: 166 (21 September 1998)

Grand Slam doubles results
- French Open Junior: QF (1996)
- Wimbledon Junior: 1R (1996)
- US Open Junior: 2R (1995)

Team competitions
- Fed Cup: 6–2

Kristina Triska (born 6 March 1980 in Älmhult) is a retired Swedish tennis player.

Triska won two singles and three doubles titles on the ITF Circuit in her career. On 15 September 1997, she reached her best singles ranking of world No. 147. On 21 September 1998, she peaked at No. 166 in the doubles rankings.

In 1998, Triska played eight rubbers for the Sweden Fed Cup team.

== ITF Circuit finals ==
=== Singles: 8 (2–6) ===
Legend $100,000 tournaments $75,000 tournaments $50,000 tournaments $25,000 tournaments $10,000 tournaments	Finals by surface Hard (2–4) Clay (0–2) Grass (0–0) Carpet (0–0)

Outcome	No.	Date	Tournament	Surface	Opponent	Score
Runner-up	1.	6 November 1995	ITF Santo Domingo, Dominican Republic	Clay	(United States) Jeri Ingram	3–6, 5–7
Runner-up	2.	13 November 1995	ITF San Salvador 2, El Salvador	Clay	(United Kingdom) Joanne Moore	3–6, 2–6
Runner-up	3.	15 April 1996	ITF Elvas, Portugal	Hard	(Spain) Elena Salvador	0–6, 6–4, 4–6
Winner	1.	22 April 1996	ITF Azeméis, Portugal	Hard	(Spain) Marina Escobar	4–6, 6–1, 6–2
Winner	2.	29 April 1996	ITF Guimarães, Portugal	Hard	(United States) Julie Steven	6–1, 6–0
Runner-up	4.	6 January 1997	ITF Delray Beach 1, United States	Hard	(United States) Stephanie Mabry	3–6, 1–6
Runner-up	5.	17 March 1997	ITF Woodlands, United States	Hard	(United States) Keri Phebus	1–6, 5–7
Runner-up	6.	21 June 1999	ITF Montreal 2, Canada	Hard	(Venezuela) Milagros Sequera	6–7^{(7–9)}, 6–7^{(7–9)}

=== Doubles: 7 (3–4) ===
Legend $100,000 tournaments $75,000 tournaments $50,000 tournaments $25,000 tournaments $10,000 tournaments	Finals by surface Hard (3–4) Clay (0–0) Grass (0–0) Carpet (0–0)

Outcome	No.	Date	Tournament	Surface	Partner	Opponents	Score
Runner-up	1.	22 April 1996	ITF Azeméis, Portugal	Hard	(France) Kildine Chevalier	(Finland) Hanna-Katri Aalto (Finland) Kirsi Lampinen	0–6, 2–6
Winner	1.	29 April 1996	ITF Guimarães, Portugal	Hard	(United Kingdom) Claire Taylor	(United States) Jennifer Poulos (China) Jody Yin	7–5, 6–3
Runner-up	2.	17 March 1997	ITF Woodlands, United States	Hard	(Germany) Sabine Haas	(Belgium) Nancy Feber (South Africa) Liezel Horn	1–6, 2–6
Winner	2.	30 March 1998	ITF Phoenix, United States	Hard	(Poland) Aleksandra Olsza	(United States) Amy Frazier (Japan) Rika Hiraki	6–4, 7–6^{(7–5)}
Runner-up	3.	1 March 1999	ITF Albufeira, Portugal	Hard	(Georgia (country)) Nino Louarsabishvili	(Czech Republic) Olga Blahotová (Czech Republic) Gabriela Navrátilová	3–6, 2–6
Runner-up	4.	5 April 1999	ITF Fresno, United States	Hard	(South Africa) Kim Grant	(United States) Erika deLone (Australia) Annabel Ellwood	5–7, 5–7
Winner	3.	21 June 1999	ITF Montreal 2, Canada	Hard	(Switzerland) Aliénor Tricerri	(Japan) Riei Kawamata (Japan) Yoshiko Sasano	5–7, 7–5, 6–2
