= Selima Sfar =

Tunisian tennis player

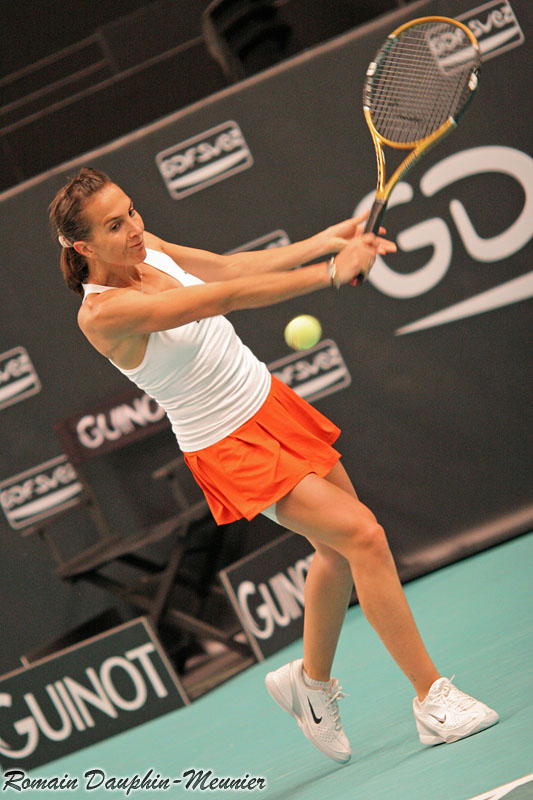
- Selima Sfar at the 2009 Open GDF Suez
- Country (sports): Tunisia
- Residence: Biarritz, France
- Born: 8 July 1977 (age 49) Sidi Bou Said, Tunisia
- Height: 1.66 m (5 ft 5 in)
- Turned pro: 1999
- Retired: 2011
- Plays: Right (two-handed backhand)
- Prize money: $876,041

Singles
- Career record: 395–383
- Career titles: 11 ITF
- Highest ranking: No. 75 (16 July 2001)

Grand Slam singles results
- Australian Open: 1R (2002, 2005)
- French Open: 2R (2001, 2008)
- Wimbledon: 2R (2001, 2002, 2005)
- US Open: 2R (2001)

Other tournaments
- Olympic Games: 1R (1996, 2008)

Doubles
- Career record: 238–201
- Career titles: 21 ITF
- Highest ranking: No. 47 (28 July 2008)

Grand Slam doubles results
- Australian Open: 2R (2006, 2008)
- French Open: 2R (2005, 2007)
- Wimbledon: QF (2008)
- US Open: 2R (2005, 2006, 2007)

Team competitions
- Fed Cup: 41–24

Selima Sfar (Arabic: سليمة صفر Salima Safar; born 8 July 1977) is a Tunisian former tennis player.

She turned professional in 1999 and has been ranked as high as 75th in the world (16 July 2001). Sfar is the second highest ranked female Tunisian and Arab player. She has experienced most of her success in tournaments of the ITF Women's Circuit, winning 11 singles titles and 21 doubles titles.

== Biography ==
Sfar started playing tennis at age 8 at the Tennis Club of Carthage. She left Tunis at age 12 to live and train with Nathalie Tauziat under coach Régis de Camaret in Biarritz, France. The serve-and-volleyer preferred indoor hardcourts; favorite shots were serve, backhand. Father, Moncef, is a physician; mother, Zeineb, is a dermatologist; older sister is Sonia and younger brother is Hassan. She is a granddaughter of Habib Cheikhrouhou who founded the press group Dar Assabah in 1951.

== Tennis career ==
As a junior, Sfar won the Arab Junior Singles in 1992 and reached the quarter-finals of the junior tournament at French Open. In 1994, she was African junior champion. She turned professional in 1999. In 2000, she qualified for the US Open, to become the first Tunisian to achieve this feat. In the meantime, she was able to receive wildcards for Middle Eastern tournaments in Qatar and the United Arab Emirates. At the Dubai Tennis Championships in 2001, she reached the quarterfinals, beating Silvija Talaja and Barbara Schett before being defeated by Nathalie Tauziat, in three sets. In that year, she became the first Arab woman to break into the top 100 of the WTA rankings.

Sfar played for the Tunisia Fed Cup team, going 41–24. She also competed in the 1996 Summer Olympics, losing in the first round to Brenda Schultz-McCarthy, and the 2008 Summer Olympics, losing in the first round to Caroline Wozniacki. Sfar holds the records for the Tunesian in the Fed Cup with the most wins, the most singles wins, the most doubles wins, the most ties played, and the most years played.

At the 2005 African Cup of Nations in Tunis, Sfar won the gold medal at both the singles and mixed teams' competitions.

At the 2008 Wimbledon Championships, Sfar and her partner Ekaterina Makarova reached the quarterfinals of the ladies' doubles, before they were defeated by Lisa Raymond and Samantha Stosur.

In 2011, Sfar announced her retirement from professional tennis. In the meantime, she became a commentator for Qatari sports channel, beIN Sports.

At the 2015 Wimbledon Championships, Sfar teamed with Martina Navratilova for the Invitational Ladies Doubles, and they won all three of their matches in their group.

== Post-retirement ==
On 28 August 2023, Sfar had an interview with L'Équipe in which she accused her coach, Régis de Camaret, of rape and sexual abuse, when she was 12 and a half years old. The same coach was accused by Isabelle Demongeot of similar misconduct and later jailed for 8 years in 2012. Eight weeks later, in September 2023, Sfar gave a further interview to CNN Arabic, in which she described her decision to speak publicly and announced her intention to create a structure dedicated to preventing institutional abuse in sport and supporting survivors: "I decided to create a company with this professional to share this method and to help preventing abuse in sports institutions specifically, and also to help people who got abused to get out of it."

On 13 May 2022, Sfar had co-founded Unus Mundus, a consulting and transformation methodology firm registered in Dubai, alongside Fernando Cavalher, described by L'Équipe as a "spécialiste de l'inconscient et des rêves" (specialist in the unconscious mind and dreams) and creator of the Paradigm of Sense, a post-Jungian system of psychological thought developed over nearly three decades.

Sfar serves as Marraine (Patron) of Université Paris-Dauphine PSL Campus de Tunis. In December 2025, she co-presented "The Shark Mindset Experience" at Université Paris-Dauphine PSL in Paris, an event exploring emotional intelligence and leadership presence.

In 2026, Unus Mundus and Université Paris-Dauphine PSL Campus de Tunis jointly launched The Management Code, described by the university as the first Executive Education programme in the world entirely dedicated to the quality of sovereign leadership presence in organisations. The programme runs over 28 hours across four days and is structured around four pillars: emotional intelligence, immaterial presence and sovereignty, the intelligence of error and the unknown, and Jungian typology as a strategic tool for collective intelligence.

Sfar is represented as an international keynote speaker by Champions Speakers Agency and has served as a Global Brand Ambassador for Lacoste.

== ITF finals ==
$100,000 tournaments
$75,000 tournaments
$50,000 tournaments
$25,000 tournaments
$10,000 tournaments

=== Singles: 19 (11–8) ===
Result	No.	Date	Tournament	Surface	Opponent	Score
Win	1.	14 August 1994	ITF Carthage, Tunisia	Clay	(France) Anne-Gaëlle Sidot	5–7, 6–3, 6–4
Win	2.	26 March 1995	ITF Moulins, France	Hard (i)	(Netherlands) Linda Sentis	3–6, 6–3, 6–2
Win	3.	26 November 1995	ITF Le Havre, France	Clay (i)	(France) Émilie Loit	0–6, 6–3, 6–4
Win	4.	4 February 1996	ITF Dinan, France	Clay (i)	(France) Virginie Massart	6–4, 7–6^{(8)}
Win	5.	11 August 1996	ITF Carthage, Tunisia	Clay	(Netherlands) Marielle Bruens	7–5, 6–4
Win	6.	14 December 1997	ITF Ismailia, Egypt	Clay	(Israel) Tzipora Obziler	5–7, 7–5, 6–4
Loss	1.	22 June 1998	ITF Sezze, Italy	Clay	(Italy) Alice Canepa	5–7, 2–6
Win	7.	30 April 2000	ITF Bournemouth, United Kingdom	Clay	(Serbia and Montenegro) Dragana Zarić	7–5, 6–2
Loss	2.	17 July 2000	ITF Le Touquet, France	Clay	(Germany) Bianka Lamade	5–7, 4–6
Loss	3.	31 July 2000	Open Saint-Gaudens, France	Clay	(Ukraine) Elena Tatarkova	4–6, 4–6
Win	8.	22 September 2002	GB Pro-Series Glasgow, UK	Hard (i)	(United Kingdom) Anne Keothavong	7–6^{(5)}, 2–6, 7–6^{(8)}
Win	9.	3 November 2002	ITF Nottingham, United Kingdom	Hard (i)	(United States) Lilia Osterloh	6–2, 6–2
Loss	4.	26 July 2004	ITF Modena, Italy	Clay	(Germany) Anna-Lena Grönefeld	2–6, 4–6
Loss	5.	1 November 2004	ITF Sint-Katelijne-Waver, Belgium	Hard (i)	(Austria) Yvonne Meusburger	4–6, 3–6
Win	10.	14 May 2006	ITF Jounieh, Lebanon	Clay	(Belarus) Anastasiya Yakimova	6–4, 7–5
Loss	6.	10 April 2007	Open de Biarritz, France	Clay	(France) Pauline Parmentier	2–6, 4–6
Win	11.	13 May 2007	ITF Jounieh, Lebanon	Clay	(Ukraine) Mariya Koryttseva	6–2, 4–6, 7–6^{(3)}
Loss	7.	7 April 2008	Open de Biarritz, France	Clay	(Germany) Kathrin Wörle	1–6, 3–6
Loss	8.	5 July 2009	ITF Mont-de-Marsan, France	Clay	(Greece) Anna Gerasimou	5–7, 3–6

=== Doubles: 33 (21–12) ===
Result	No.	Date	Tournament	Surface	Partner	Opponents	Score
Win	1.	25 July 1994	ITF La Coruña, Spain	Clay	(France) Olivia de Camaret	(Spain) Sandra de Rafael (Spain) Paula Hermida	4–6, 6–2, 6–3
Win	2.	1 August 1994	ITF Casablanca, Morocco	Clay	(France) Olivia de Camaret	(Germany) Cora Hofmann (Germany) Alexandra Seitarth	4–6, 6–1, 6–0
Loss	1.	5 August 1996	ITF Carthage, Tunisia	Clay	(France) Sandrine Bouilleau	(Netherlands) Mariëlle Bruens (Morocco) Bahia Mouhtassine	w/o
Win	3.	21 April 1997	ITF Guimarães, Portugal	Hard	(France) Élodie Le Bescond	(France) Kildine Chevalier (Czech Republic) Jindra Gabrisová	6–4, 6–2
Win	4.	8 December 1997	ITF Ismailia, Egypt	Clay	(France) Bérangère Karpenschif	(Austria) Bianca Kamper (Austria) Nicole Remis	6–3, 7–6^{(5)}
Loss	2.	11 May 1998	ITF Le Touquet, France	Clay	(France) Élodie Le Bescond	(France) Vanina Casanova (Argentina) Romina Ottoboni	6–7, 0–1 ret.
Win	5.	22 June 1998	ITF Sezze, Italy	Clay	(France) Vanina Casanova	(Italy) Alice Canepa (Italy) Alessia Lombardi	6–3, 6–1
Win	6.	20 July 1998	ITF Valladolid, Spain	Hard	(Spain) Gisela Riera	(Spain) Eva Bes (Spain) Rosa María Andrés Rodríguez	7–6^{(5)}, 7–6^{(3)}
Loss	3.	27 July 1998	ITF Pamplona, Spain	Hard	(Germany) Meike Fröhlich	(Spain) Eva Bes (Netherlands) Amanda Hopmans	w/o
Win	7.	10 May 1999	ITF Edinburgh, United Kingdom	Clay	(United Kingdom) Jo Ward	(South Africa) Surina De Beer (United Kingdom) Lorna Woodroffe	6–4, 6–2
Loss	4.	26 July 1999	ITF Pamplona, Spain	Hard	(United Kingdom) Jo Ward	(Japan) Hiroko Mochizuki (Czech Republic) Ludmila Richterová	6–2, 4–6, 3–6
Win	8.	2 August 1999	ITF Perigueux, France	Clay	(United Kingdom) Jo Ward	(Finland) Hanna-Katri Aalto (Japan) Rika Fujiwara	6–4, 6–3
Loss	5.	6 February 2000	ITF Jersey, United Kingdom	Hard (i)	(United Kingdom) Jo Ward	(Russia) Elena Bovina (Ukraine) Anna Zaporozhanova	3–6, 2–6
Win	9.	24 April 2000	ITF Bournemouth, United Kingdom	Clay	(United Kingdom) Lorna Woodroffe	(United Kingdom) Hannah Collin (Hungary) Zsófia Gubacsi	6–1, 6–0
Win	10.	1 May 2000	ITF Hatfield, United Kingdom	Clay	(United Kingdom) Jo Ward	(Hungary) Zsófia Gubacsi (Germany) Jasmin Wöhr	7–6^{(6)}, 6–2
Loss	6.	15 May 2000	ITF Edinburgh, United Kingdom	Clay	(United Kingdom) Lorna Woodroffe	(South Africa) Natalie Grandin (South Africa) Nicole Rencken	6–0, 3–6, 4–6
Loss	7.	3 November 2002	ITF Nottingham, United Kingdom	Hard (i)	(United Kingdom) Lucie Ahl	(South Africa) Kim Grant (United States) Lilia Osterloh	1–6, 2–6
Win	11.	20 April 2003	Open de Biarritz, France	Clay	(United Kingdom) Lucie Ahl	(Ukraine) Yuliya Beygelzimer (Ukraine) Anna Zaporozhanova	6–1, 6–1
Loss	8.	18 August 2003	Bronx Open, United States	Hard	(Italy) Mara Santangelo	(Ukraine) Yuliya Beygelzimer (Belarus) Tatiana Poutchek	4–6, 5–7
Win	12.	13 September 2004	ITF Bordeaux, France	Clay	(France) Stéphanie Cohen-Aloro	(Argentina) Erica Krauth (Germany) Jasmin Wöhr	3–6, 6–3, 6–3
Loss	9.	10 October 2004	Open de Touraine, France	Clay	(France) Stéphanie Cohen-Aloro	(Czech Republic) Květa Peschke (Germany) Angelika Rösch	w/o
Win	13.	18 October 2004	ITF Saint-Raphaël, France	Hard (i)	(France) Stéphanie Cohen-Aloro	(Czech Republic) Barbora Strýcová (Kazakhstan) Galina Voskoboeva	7–6^{(3)}, 2–6, 6–4
Win	14.	1 November 2004	ITF Sint-Katelijne-Waver, Belgium	Hard (i)	(France) Virginie Pichet	(Slovakia) Eva Fislová (Slovakia) Stanislava Hrozenská	6–1, 7–6^{(2)}
Win	15.	23 November 2004	ITF Poitiers, France	Hard (i)	(France) Stéphanie Cohen-Aloro	(Czech Republic) Gabriela Chmelinová (Czech Republic) Michaela Paštiková	7–5, 6–4
Win	16.	12 April 2005	Open de Biarritz, France	Clay	(France) Stéphanie Cohen-Aloro	(Switzerland) Timea Bacsinszky (France) Aurélie Védy	6–2, 6–1
Win	17.	15 November 2005	ITF Deauville, France	Clay (i)	(France) Stéphanie Cohen-Aloro	(Ukraine) Alona Bondarenko (Ukraine) Kateryna Bondarenko	6–3, 6–1
Loss	10.	26 March 2007	ITF Latina, Italy	Hard	(France) Stéphanie Cohen-Aloro	(Italy) Sara Errani (Italy) Giulia Gabba	3–6, 6–1, 6–7^{(2)}
Loss	11.	6 April 2008	ITF Torhout, Belgium	Hard	(France) Stéphanie Cohen-Alor	(Russia) Anastasia Pavlyuchenkova (Belgium) Yanina Wickmayer	4–6, 6–4, [8–10]
Win	18.	20 July 2009	ITF Pétange, Luxembourg	Clay	(France) Stéphanie Cohen-Aloro	(Croatia) Darija Jurak (Germany) Kathrin Wörle	6–2, 3–6, [10–7]
Win	19.	12 October 2009	Open de Touraine, France	Hard	(France) Youlia Fedossova	(France) Stéphanie Cohen-Aloro (France) Aurélie Védy	4–6, 6–0, [10–8]
Win	20.	22 February 2010	Biberach Open, Germany	Hard (i)	(France) Stéphanie Cohen-Aloro	(Germany) Mona Barthel (Germany) Carmen Klaschka	5–7, 6–1, [10–5]
Loss	12.	17 October 2010	Open de Touraine, France	Hard (i)	(France) Stéphanie Cohen-Aloro	(Germany) Tatjana Malek (France) Irena Pavlovic	4–6, 7–5, [8–10]
Win	21.	24 January 2011	Open de l'Isère, France	Hard (i)	(France) Stéphanie Cohen-Aloro	(France) Iryna Brémond (France) Aurélie Védy	6–1, 6–3
