= Vesenjak =

Vesenjak is a surname. Notable people with the surname include:

- Maša Vesenjak (born 1982), Slovenian tennis player
- Slavko Vesenjak (born 1981), Slovenian lawyer
- Urška Vesenjak (born 1982), Slovenian tennis player
