= Fatakhetdinov =

Fatakhetdinov or Fatakhetdinova is a surname. Notable people with the surname include:

- Rinat Fatakhetdinov
- Gulnara Fattakhetdinova
