= Manisha Malhotra =

Indian tennis player

Manisha Malhotra मनीषा मल्होत्रा
- Country (sports): India
- Residence: Mumbai, India
- Born: 19 September 1976 (age 50) Mumbai
- Turned pro: 1996
- Retired: 2004
- Plays: Right-handed (two-handed backhand)
- Prize money: $52,259

Singles
- Career record: 136–92136–92
- Career titles: 0 WTA, 5 ITF
- Highest ranking: No. 314 (21 April 2003)

Doubles
- Career record: 93–67
- Career titles: 7 ITF
- Highest ranking: No. 149 (8 April 2002)

Other doubles tournaments
- Olympic Games: 1R (2000)

Team competitions
- Fed Cup: 17–15

Manisha Malhotra
Medal record

Asian Games
| Silver medal – second place | 2002 Busan | Mixed doubles |

Manisha Malhotra (Hindi: मनीषा मल्होत्रा Manīṣā Maľhōtrā; born 19 September 1976) is a former professional tennis player from India.

Her career high in singles is 314, achieved on 21 April 2003. In doubles, she peaked at No. 149 in the WTA rankings on 8 April 2002. In her career, Malhotra won five singles and seven doubles titles on the ITF Women's Circuit.

Playing for India in the Fed Cup, Malhotra has a win–loss record of 17–15.

== Career ==
Malhotra represented India at the 2000 Sydney Olympics in the women's doubles tournament, partnering Nirupama Vaidyanathan but lost in the first round to Jelena Dokić and Rennae Stubbs.

At the 2001 Swiss Indoors, she was defeated in the first qualifying round by Maja Palaveršić. This was her first match at WTA Tour-level.

Malhotra had her most successful year in 2002, when she was the runner-up at the Busan Asian Games and won the silver medal in the mixed doubles draw, partnering Mahesh Bhupathi.

Malhotra qualified for the 2003 Hyderabad Open, winning three matches; but lost in the first round to Tatiana Poutchek. This was her second and last tournament at the WTA-level.

She retired from professional tennis in 2004. Her last singles match was a loss in the first qualifying round against Maki Arai, at a $50k ITF tournament in Shenzhen, China, in early December 2003. Her last doubles matches came at the 2004 Fed Cup when she won three of her ties (against Uzbekistan, South Korea, and Taiwan), and lost one (against Indonesia) (all partnering Sania Mirza).

Along with Sania Mirza, Malhotra holds the record of the Longest Fed Cup tie break (21–19), which they achieved against Uzbekistan in 2004.

== ITF finals ==
$100,000 tournaments
$75,000 tournaments
$50,000 tournaments
$25,000 tournaments
$10,000 tournaments

=== Singles (5–4) ===
| Result | No. | Date | Tournament | Surface | Opponent | Score |
|---|---|---|---|---|---|---|
| Loss | 1. | 8 August 1998 | Southsea, United Kingdom | Grass | (Greece) Eleni Daniilidou | 6–7^{(5)}, 3–6 |
| Loss | 2. | 30 May 1999 | El Paso, United States | Hard | (United States) Sara Walker | 3–6, 3–6 |
| Win | 3. | 8 August 1999 | Harrisonburg, United States | Hard | (United States) Michelle Dasso | 6–4, 6–3 |
| Win | 4. | 26 September 1999 | Sunderland, United Kingdom | Hard (i) | (United Kingdom) Nicola Payne | 2–6, 6–1, 6–0 |
| Loss | 5. | 3 October 1999 | Glasgow, United Kingdom | Carpet (i) | (Germany) Gréta Arn | w/o |
| Win | 6. | 23 July 2000 | Baltimore, United States | Hard | (Japan) Rika Fujiwara | 7–6^{(5)}, 6–7^{(4)}, 6–2 |
| Loss | 7. | 3 September 2000 | Jaipur, India | Grass | (Australia) Monique Adamczak | 2–6, 6–2, 3–6 |
| Win | 8. | 10 September 2000 | Delhi, India | Hard | (Czech Republic) Veronika Raimřová | 4–6, 6–1, 6–3 |
| Win | 9. | 13 April 2003 | Mumbai, India | Hard | (Uzbekistan) Akgul Amanmuradova | 2–6, 6–4, 7–6^{(10)} |

=== Doubles (7–8) ===
| Result | No. | Date | Tournament | Surface | Partner | Opponents | Score |
|---|---|---|---|---|---|---|---|
| Win | 1. | 30 May 1999 | El Paso, United States | Hard | (United States) Julie Scott | (South Africa) Kim Grant (United States) Sara Walker | 6–2, 6–4 |
| Loss | 2. | 3 October 1999 | Glasgow, United Kingdom | Carpet (i) | (Germany) Gréta Arn | (United Kingdom) Lizzie Jelfs (Republic of Ireland) Karen Nugent | w/o |
| Win | 3. | 20 December 1999 | Lucknow, India | Grass | (Hong Kong) Tong Ka-po | (Slovenia) Maša Vesenjak (Slovenia) Urška Vesenjak | 6–3, 5–7, 6–1 |
| Loss | 4. | 27 December 1999 | Chandigarh, India | Grass | (Serbia and Montenegro) Katarina Mišić | (Slovenia) Maša Vesenjak (Slovenia) Urška Vesenjak | 3–6, 7–6^{(7–5)}, 0–6 |
| Loss | 5. | 16 April 2000 | Mumbai, India | Hard | (Japan) Satomi Kinjo | (India) Rushmi Chakravarthi (India) Sai Jayalakshmy Jayaram | 4–6, 6–4, 1–2 ret. |
| Win | 6. | 28 May 2000 | El Paso, United States | Hard | (New Zealand) Leanne Baker | (United States) Kaysie Smashey (United States) Varalee Sureephong | 6–2, 7–6^{(7–5)} |
| Loss | 7. | 4 June 2000 | San Antonio, United States | Hard | (New Zealand) Leanne Baker | (Australia) Melanie Clayton (Australia) Emma Gott | 6–3, 6–7^{(5–7)}, 5–7 |
| Win | 8. | 11 June 2000 | Hilton Head, United States | Hard | (United States) Wendy Fix | (Venezuela) Milagros Sequera (Slovakia) Gabriela Voleková | 6–4, 7–6^{(7–3)} |
| Loss | 9. | 20 August 2000 | London, United Kingdom | Hard | (Germany) Susi Bensch | (South Africa) Natalie Grandin (South Africa) Nicole Rencken | 2–6, 7–5, 6–7^{(6–8)} |
| Loss | 10. | 5 March 2001 | Warrnambool, Australia | Grass | (Australia) Nadia Johnston | (Romania) Simona Arghire (Japan) Remi Uda | 3–6, 3–6 |
| Win | 11. | 22 April 2001 | Ho Chi Minh City, Vietnam | Hard | (India) Nirupama Vaidyanathan | (New Zealand) Leanne Baker (New Zealand) Shelley Stephens | 6–3, 7–5 |
| Win | 12. | 17 June 2001 | Marseille, France | Clay | (New Zealand) Leanne Baker | (France) Caroline Dhenin (Croatia) Maja Palaveršić | 7–6^{(7–5)}, 6–2 |
| Win | 13. | 1 July 2001 | Båstad, Sweden | Clay | (New Zealand) Leanne Baker | (Austria) Daniela Klemenschits (Austria) Sandra Klemenschits | 6–3, 6–1 |
| Loss | 14. | 3 December 2001 | Nonthaburi, Thailand | Hard | (South Korea) Jeon Mi-ra | (Croatia) Ivana Abramović (South Korea) Kim Jin-hee | 1–6, 5–7 |
| Loss | 15. | 21 July 2002 | Valladolid, Spain | Hard | (New Zealand) Leanne Baker | (United Kingdom) Elena Baltacha (Madagascar) Natacha Randriantefy | 2–6, 3–6 |

=== Other finals ===
==== Mixed doubles: 1 (silver medal) ====
| Outcome | Date | Tournament | Location | Partnering | Opponents | Score |
|---|---|---|---|---|---|---|
| Silver | 11 October 2002 | 2002 Asian Games | Busan, South Korea | (India) Mahesh Bhupathi | (Chinese Taipei) Janet Lee (Chinese Taipei) Lu Yen-hsun | 6–4, 3–6, 7–9 |
