= Adriana Barna =

German tennis player

- Country (sports): Germany
- Born: 21 May 1978 (age 47) Cluj, Romania
- Height: 1.73 m (5 ft 8 in)
- Turned pro: 1992
- Retired: 2007
- Plays: Right (two-handed backhand)
- Prize money: $239,001

Singles
- Career record: 271–300
- Career titles: 2 ITF
- Highest ranking: No. 180 (3 May 2004)

Grand Slam singles results
- Australian Open: Q2 (1995, 2000)
- French Open: Q1 (2000, 2002, 2004)
- Wimbledon: Q2 (2002)
- US Open: Q2 (1999, 2001, 2003)

Doubles
- Career record: 102–156
- Career titles: 3 ITF
- Highest ranking: No. 121 (19 May 1997)

Adriana Barna (born 21 May 1978) is a German former tennis player. The younger sister of former professional tennis player Anca Barna resides in Nuremberg, Germany.

== ITF Circuit finals ==
$50,000 tournaments
$25,000 tournaments
$10,000 tournaments

=== Singles: 6 (2–4) ===
Result	No.	Date	Tournament	Surface	Opponent	Score
Win	1.	24 May 1993	ITF Bytom, Poland	Clay	(Ukraine) Elena Tatarkova	3–6, 6–3, 6–4
Loss	2.	19 May 1997	ITF Brixen, Austria	Clay	(Hungary) Adrienn Hegedűs	3–6, 3–6
Win	3.	26 July 1999	ITF Les Contamines, France	Hard	(Czech Republic) Lenka Cenková	7–6, 6–2
Loss	4.	24 November 2002	ITF Mumbai, India	Hard	(Israel) Tzipora Obziler	2–6, 2–6
Loss	5.	26 January 2004	ITF Belfort, France	Hard (i)	(Poland) Marta Domachowska	6–3, 0–6, 0–6
Loss	6.	6 September 2005	ITF Durmersheim, Germany	Clay	(Israel) Yevgenia Savransky	6–2, 5–7, 1–6

=== Doubles: 15 (3–12) ===
Result	No.	Date	Tournament	Surface	Partner	Opponents	Score
Loss	1.	21 September 1992	ITF Cluj, Romania	Clay	(Germany) Anca Barna	(Czech Republic) Martina Hautová (Germany) Susi Lohrmann	4–6, 1–6
Loss	2.	29 Aug 1994	ITF Maribor, Slovenia	Clay	(Hungary) Andrea Noszály	(Poland) Katharzyna Teodorowicz (Czech Republic) Helena Vildová	5–7, 0–6
Win	3.	15 July 1996	ITF Darmstadt, Germany	Clay	(Germany) Anca Barna	(Czech Republic) Lenka Cenková (Czech Republic) Pavlína Rajzlová	4–6, 6–3, 6–3
Win	4.	16 September 1996	ITF Cluj, Romania	Clay	(Romania) Andrea Petrisor	(Romania) Alexandra Greabu (Romania) Daniela Ivana	6–2, 6–2
Win	5.	23 September 1996	ITF Bucharest, Romania	Clay	(Germany) Anca Barna	(Hungary) Virag Csurgo (Russia) Julia Lutrova	4–6, 6–1, 6–0
Loss	6.	9 December 1996	ITF Salzburg, Austria	Carpet (i)	(Germany) Anca Barna	(Croatia) Mirjana Lučić-Baroni (United States) Chanda Rubin	3–6, 2–6
Loss	7.	15 September 1997	ITF Cluj, Romania	Clay	(Romania) Magda Mihalache	(Ukraine) Tatiana Kovalchuk (Ukraine) Anna Zaporozhanova	4–6, 7–5, 3–6
Loss	8.	9 December 1998	ITF Titisee-Neustadt, Germany	Carpet (i)	(Germany) Anca Barna	(Czech Republic) Květa Peschke (Czech Republic) Helena Vildová	4–6, 3–6
Loss	9.	20 September 1999	ITF Thessaloniki, Greece	Carpet	(Hungary) Adrienn Hegedűs	(South Africa) Surina De Beer (Greece) Eleni Daniilidou	2–6, 3–6
Loss	10.	29 November 1999	ITF Cergy-Pontoise, France	Hard (i)	(Germany) Anca Barna	(Germany) Jasmin Wöhr (Denmark) Eva Dyrberg	6–2, 2–6, 4–6
Loss	11.	10 July 2000	ITF Darmstadt, Germany	Clay	(Ukraine) Anna Zaporozhanova	(Slovenia) Maja Matevžič (Italy) Maria Paola Zavagli	6–7, 7–6, 4–6
Loss	12.	2 February 2003	ITF Doha, Qatar	Hard	(Germany) Scarlett Werner	(Russia) Goulnara Fattakhetdinova (Russia) Galina Fokina	4–6, 3–6
Loss	13.	4 April 2005	ITF Rome, Italy	Clay	(Romania) Andreea Ehritt-Vanc	(Italy) Alice Canepa (Italy) Emily Stellato	4–6, 0–6
Loss	14.	17 May 2005	ITF Santa Cruz de Tenerife, Spain	Hard	(Germany) Julia Babilon	(United Kingdom) Amanda Keen (United Kingdom) Anne Keothavong	6–7, 6–3, 3–6
Loss	15.	6 September 2005	ITF Durmersheim, Germany	Clay	(Germany) Caroline Schneider	(Montenegro) Danica Krstajić (Russia) Elena Chalova	6–4, 4–6, 4–6
