= Sandra Klemenschits =

Austrian tennis player

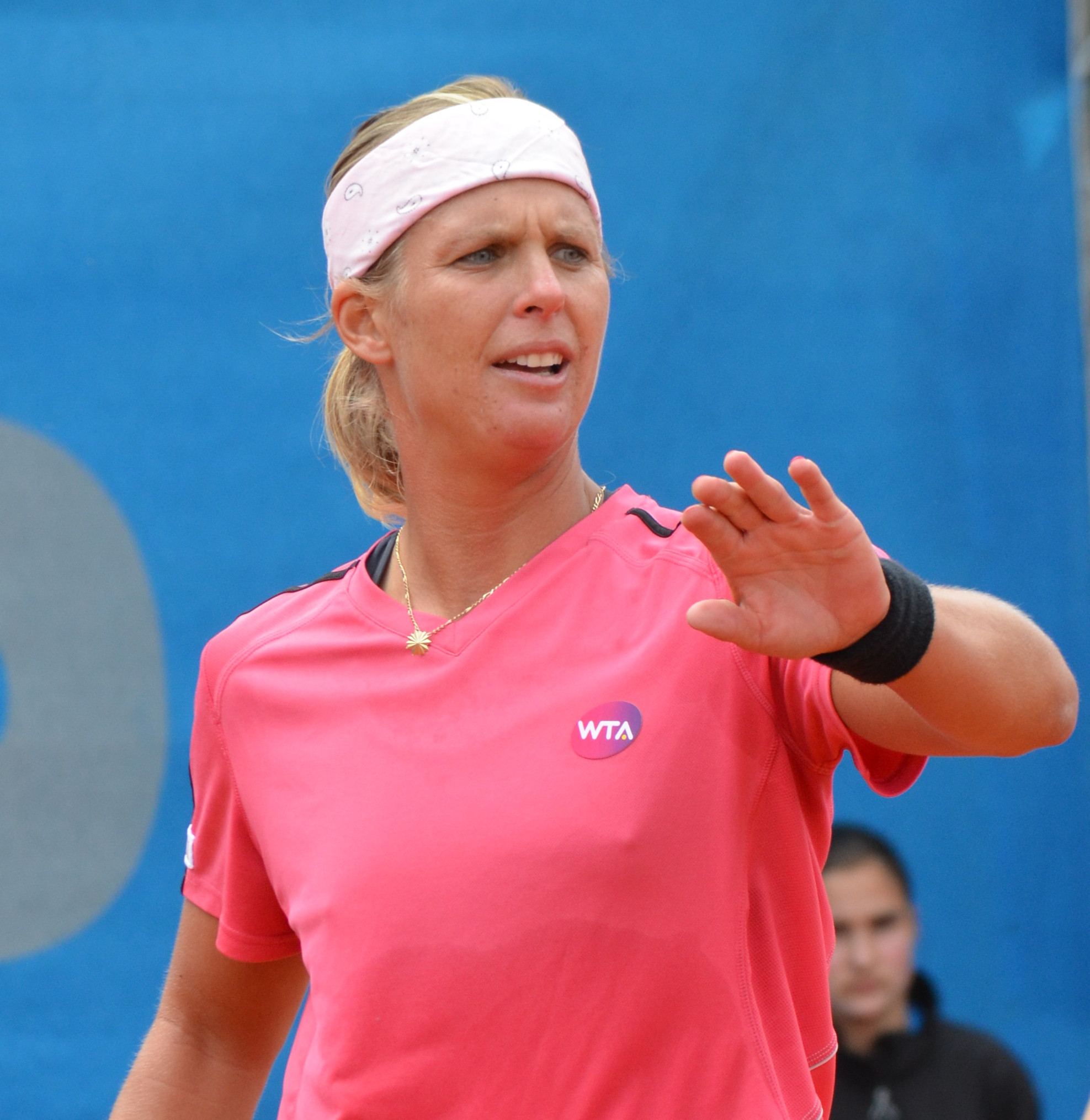
- Klemenschits at the 2015 Nürnberger Versicherungscup
- Country (sports): Austria
- Born: 13 November 1982 (age 43) Salzburg, Austria
- Height: 1.73 m (5 ft 8 in)
- Turned pro: 1999
- Retired: October 2016
- Plays: Left-handed (one-handed backhand)
- Prize money: $265,950

Singles
- Career record: 151–102
- Career titles: 5 ITF
- Highest ranking: No. 318 (11 June 2001)

Doubles
- Career record: 442–348
- Career titles: 1 WTA, 40 ITF
- Highest ranking: No. 55 (17 March 2014)

Grand Slam doubles results
- Australian Open: 1R (2014)
- French Open: 1R (2011, 2014)
- Wimbledon: 2R (2013)
- US Open: 2R (2013)

Team competitions
- Fed Cup: 11–10

Sandra Klemenschits (born 13 November 1982) is an Austrian former professional tennis player. She won one doubles title on the WTA Tour (with Andreja Klepač) and 40 doubles titles on the ITF Circuit.

Klemenschits announced that the 2016 Generali Ladies Linz would be her last tournament before her retirement from professional tennis.

== Career ==
=== 2013 ===
Klemenschits has had the best season of her career in 2013. She made a main-draw appearance in a major doubles event for the first time in over two years. Partnering with Romina Oprandi, she made it to the second round of Wimbledon, her farthest appearance in a Grand Slam tournament. After Wimbledon, Klemenschits had great success on the European clay with her regular partner of that year, Andreja Klepač. The team made the semifinals in Budapest and the week after won its first WTA title at Klemenschits' home tournament, Gastein Ladies, in Bad Gastein, Austria.

== Personal life ==
In January 2007 Klemenschits and her twin sister Daniela with whom she was regularly playing doubles were diagnosed with a rare form of abdominal cancer, squamous cell carcinoma, forcing them to retire. Her sister died of the cancer on 9 April 2008. Sandra returned to the doubles tour in July 2008, and has since won more ITF doubles titles as well as her first WTA doubles title in July 2013.

== WTA career finals ==
=== Doubles: 3 (1 title, 2 runner-ups) ===
Winner — Legend Grand Slam tournaments Premier M & Premier 5 Premier International (1–2)	Finals by surface Hard (0–1) Clay (1–1) Grass (0–0) Carpet (0–0)

Outcome	No.	Date	Tournament	Surface	Partner	Opponents	Score
Runner-up	1.	21 May 2005	İstanbul Cup, Turkey	Hard	(Austria) Daniela Klemenschits	(Spain) Marta Marrero (Italy) Antonella Serra Zanetti	4–6, 0–6
Runner-up	2.	24 April 2011	Fes Grand Prix, Morocco	Clay	(Russia) Nina Bratchikova	(Czech Republic) Andrea Hlaváčková (Czech Republic) Renata Voráčová	3–6, 4–6
Winner	1.	21 July 2013	Gastein Ladies, Austria	Clay	(Slovenia) Andreja Klepač	(Germany) Kristina Barrois (Greece) Eleni Daniilidou	6–1, 6–4

== ITF finals ==
$100,000 tournaments
$75,000 tournaments
$50,000 tournaments
$25,000 tournaments
$10,000 tournaments

=== Singles: 8 (5–3) ===
Outcome	No.	Date	Tournament	Surface	Opponent	Score
Winner	1.	31 July 2000	Rabat, Morocco	Clay	(Russia) Ekaterina Kozhokina	7–5, 6–1
Winner	2.	2 October 2000	Cairo, Egypt	Clay	(Slovakia) Zuzana Kučová	1–4, 2–4, 4–1, 5–4^{(4)}, 5–3
Winner	3.	23 April 2001	Bournemouth, United Kingdom	Clay	(Soviet Union) Natalia Egorova	4–6, 6–2, 6–0
Winner	4.	15 October 2001	Giza, Egypt	Clay	(Russia) Goulnara Fattakhetdinova	6–3, 6–3
Runner-up	1.	15 April 2002	Hvar, Croatia	Clay	(Romania) Edina Gallovits	6–2, 6–1
Runner-up	2.	28 July 2003	Gardone Val Trompia, Italy	Clay	(Italy) Alice Canepa	6–2, 6–3
Winner	5.	12 January 2005	Dubai, United Arab Emirates	Hard	(Hungary) Kyra Nagy	6–4, 6–1
Runner-up	3.	26 June 2006	Anif, Austria	Clay	(Hungary) Katalin Marosi	w/o

=== Doubles: 83 (40–43) ===
Outcome	No.	Date	Tournament	Surface	Partner	Opponents	Score
Winner	1.	31 July 2000	Rabat, Morocco	Clay	(Austria) Daniela Klemenschits	(Austria) Bianca Kamper (Russia) Ekaterina Kozhokina	7–6^{(4)}, 6–0
Runner-up	1.	21 August 2000	Kastoria, Greece	Carpet	(Austria) Daniela Klemenschits	(Greece) Eleni Daniilidou (Greece) Evagelia Roussi	6–3, 6–4
Winner	2.	2 October 2000	Cairo, Egypt	Clay	(Austria) Daniela Klemenschits	(Slovakia) Andrea Masaryková (Switzerland) Aliénor Tricerri	4–1, 4–1, 4–2
Winner	3.	9 October 2000	Cairo, Egypt	Clay	(Austria) Daniela Klemenschits	(Slovakia) Barbora Blahutiaková (Slovakia) Zuzana Kučová	4–0, 4–0, 4–0
Winner	4.	18 November 2000	Beersheba, Israel	Hard	(Austria) Daniela Klemenschits	(Italy) Giulia Meruzzi (Netherlands) Leonne Muller van Moppe	4–0, 4–0, 5–3
Runner-up	2.	27 November 2000	Arad, Israel	Hard	(Austria) Daniela Klemenschits	(Italy) Giulia Meruzzi (Netherlands) Leonne Muller van Moppe	5–4^{(4)}, 4–1, 4–2
Runner-up	3.	12 February 2001	Faro, Portugal	Hard	(Austria) Daniela Klemenschits	(Czech Republic) Olga Vymetálková (Czech Republic) Gabriela Navrátilová	6–0, 6–2
Winner	5.	5 March 2001	Buchen, Germany	Carpet (i)	(Austria) Daniela Klemenschits	(Hungary) Adrienn Hegedűs (Hungary) Eszter Molnár	7–6^{(5)}, 7–6^{(8)}
Winner	6.	2 April 2001	Athens, Greece	Clay	(Austria) Daniela Klemenschits	(Croatia) Marijana Kovačević (Bulgaria) Biljana Pawlowa-Dimitrova	6–3, 7–5
Winner	7.	16 April 2001	Belgrade, Yugoslavia	Clay	(Austria) Daniela Klemenschits	(Federal Republic of Yugoslavia) Dragana Ilić (Federal Republic of Yugoslavia) Ana Timotić	6–2, 6–1
Runner-up	4.	23 April 2001	Bournemouth, UK	Clay	(Austria) Daniela Klemenschits	(Japan) Maki Arai (United Kingdom) Julia Smith	6–7^{(4)}, 6–3, 6–3
Winner	8.	7 May 2001	Tortosa, Spain	Clay	(Austria) Daniela Klemenschits	(France) Severine Beltrame (France) Capucine Rousseau	6–3, 6–3
Runner-up	5.	28 May 2001	Biella, Italy	Clay	(Austria) Daniela Klemenschits	(Brazil) Joana Cortez (Brazil) Vanessa Menga	7–6^{(4)}, 4–6, 6–3
Runner-up	6.	23 June 2001	Båstad, Sweden	Clay	(Austria) Daniela Klemenschits	(New Zealand) Leanne Baker (India) Manisha Malhotra	6–3, 6–1
Runner-up	7.	6 August 2001	Hechingen, Germany	Clay	(Austria) Daniela Klemenschits	(Germany) Magdalena Kučerová (Germany) Lydia Steinbach	5–7, 6–2, 6–1
Runner-up	8.	1 October 2001	Plzeň, Czech Republic	Carpet (i)	(Austria) Daniela Klemenschits	(Czech Republic) Olga Vymetálková (Czech Republic) Gabriela Navrátilová	6–2, 6–3
Winner	9.	15 October 2001	Giza, Egypt	Clay	(Austria) Daniela Klemenschits	(Ukraine) Olena Antypina (Ukraine) Yuliana Fedak	6–4, 6–3
Runner-up	9.	22 October 2001	Cairo, Egypt	Clay	(Austria) Daniela Klemenschits	(Russia) Goulnara Fattakhetdinova (Belarus) Elena Yaryshka	7–6^{(2)}, 6–3
Winner	10.	19 November 2001	Mallorca, Spain	Clay	(Austria) Daniela Klemenschits	(Italy) Silvia Disderi (Italy) Anna Floris	7–5, 6–4
Winner	11.	26 November 2001	Mallorca, Spain	Clay	(Austria) Daniela Klemenschits	(Italy) Silvia Disderi (Italy) Anna Floris	6–3, 6–4
Winner	12.	15 April 2002	Hvar, Croatia	Clay	(Austria) Daniela Klemenschits	(Ukraine) Olena Antypina (Slovakia) Lenka Tvarošková	4–6, 6–3, 6–0
Runner-up	10.	22 April 2002	Cavtat, Croatia	Clay	(Austria) Daniela Klemenschits	(Netherlands) Susanne Trik (Netherlands) Suzanne van Hartingsveldt	6–1, 6–3
Winner	13.	6 May 2002	Zadar, Croatia	Clay	(Austria) Daniela Klemenschits	(Slovenia) Tina Hergold (Croatia) Sanda Mamić	6–4, 6–4
Winner	14.	17 June 2002	Velp, Netherlands	Clay	(Austria) Daniela Klemenschits	(Sweden) Helena Ejeson (Netherlands) Kika Hogendoorn	6–2, 6–1
Winner	15.	23 September 2002	Sopron, Hungary	Clay	(Austria) Daniela Klemenschits	(Czech Republic) Milena Nekvapilová (Czech Republic) Hana Šromová	6–7^{(2)}, 6–2, 6–2
Runner-up	11.	7 April 2003	Antalya, Turkey	Clay	(Austria) Daniela Klemenschits	(Czech Republic) Zuzana Černá (Czech Republic) Vladimíra Uhlířová	6–3, 6–2
Winner	16.	28 April 2003	Pula, Croatia	Clay	(Austria) Daniela Klemenschits	(Czech Republic) Jana Macurová (Slovakia) Zuzana Zemenová	6–2, 6–2
Runner-up	12.	26 May 2003	Zadar, Croatia	Clay	(Austria) Daniela Klemenschits	(Bosnia and Herzegovina) Mervana Jugić-Salkić (Croatia) Darija Jurak	6–3, 6–1
Runner-up	13.	28 July 2003	Gardone Val Trompia, Italy	Clay	(Austria) Daniela Klemenschits	(France) Kildine Chevalier (Italy) Silvia Disderi	6–4, 6–2
Runner-up	14.	4 August 2003	Hechingen, Germany	Clay	(Austria) Daniela Klemenschits	(Germany) Angelika Bachmann (Germany) Jasmin Wöhr	6–1, 6–4
Runner-up	15.	15 September 2003	Sofia, Bulgaria	Clay	(Austria) Daniela Klemenschits	(Bulgaria) Dessislava Topalova (Serbia and Montenegro) Dragana Zarić	6–3, 7–5
Runner-up	16.	12 January 2004	Dubai, United Arab Emirates	Hard	(Austria) Daniela Klemenschits	(Russia) Goulnara Fattakhetdinova (Czech Republic) Hana Šromová	6–3, 4–6, 6–4
Runner-up	17.	8 March 2004	Rome, Italy	Clay	(Austria) Daniela Klemenschits	(Italy) Alice Canepa (Italy) Emily Stellato	6–3, 2–6, 6–4
Runner-up	18.	29 March 2004	Rabat, Morocco	Clay	(Austria) Daniela Klemenschits	(Brazil) Maria Fernanda Alves (Brazil) Carla Tiene	6–1, 7–6^{(5)}
Winner	17.	26 April 2004	Taranto, Italy	Clay	(Austria) Daniela Klemenschits	(Austria) Stefanie Haidner (Austria) Patricia Wartusch	6–2, 6–1
Runner-up	19.	16 August 2004	Enschede, Netherlands	Clay	(Austria) Daniela Klemenschits	(Netherlands) Susanne Trik (Netherlands) Tessy van de Ven	4–6, 6–0, 6–4
Runner-up	20.	23 August 2004	Alphen aan den Rijn, Netherlands	Clay	(Austria) Daniela Klemenschits	(Belgium) Leslie Butkiewicz (Belgium) Eveline Vanhyfte	7–5, 6–3
Runner-up	21.	4 October 2004	Girona, Spain	Clay	(Austria) Daniela Klemenschits	(Argentina) Erica Krauth (Germany) Jasmin Wöhr	2–6, 6–4, 6–3
Winner	18.	13 December 2004	Valašské Meziříčí, Czech Republic	Hard (i)	(Austria) Daniela Klemenschits	(Czech Republic) Lucie Hradecká (Czech Republic) Eva Hrdinová	w/o
Winner	19.	12 January 2005	Dubai, United Arab Emirates	Hard	(Austria) Daniela Klemenschits	(Russia) Kristina Grigorian (Ukraine) Oxana Lyubtsova	7–5, 6–1
Runner-up	22.	24 January 2005	Belfort, France	Hard (i)	(Austria) Daniela Klemenschits	(Netherlands) Michelle Gerards (Netherlands) Anousjka van Exel	6–1, 4–2 ret.
Runner-up	23.	15 March 2005	Morelia, Mexico	Hard	(Austria) Daniela Klemenschits	(Argentina) Jorgelina Cravero (Argentina) Veronica Spiegel	6–4, 6–2
Runner-up	24.	29 March 2005	Poza Rica, Mexico	Hard	(Austria) Daniela Klemenschits	(Netherlands) Seda Noorlander (Italy) Mara Santangelo	6–2, 4–6, 6–3
Runner-up	25.	30 May 2005	Raanana, Israel	Hard	(Austria) Daniela Klemenschits	(Israel) Tzipora Obziler (Israel) Shahar Pe'er	7–6^{(2)}, 1–6, 6–2
Runner-up	26.	6 June 2005	Zagreb, Croatia	Clay	(Austria) Daniela Klemenschits	(Czech Republic) Lucie Hradecká (Czech Republic) Vladimíra Uhlířová	6–2, 6–2
Runner-up	27.	24 April 2006	Cagnes-sur-Mer, France	Clay	(Austria) Daniela Klemenschits	(France) Sophie Lefèvre (France) Aurélie Védy	2–6, 6–4, 7–6^{(1)}
Runner-up	28.	21 June 2006	Fontanafredda, Italy	Clay	(Austria) Daniela Klemenschits	(Czech Republic) Andrea Hlaváčková (Czech Republic) Renata Voráčová	6–4, 6–4
Runner-up	29.	26 June 2006	Anif, Austria	Clay	(Austria) Daniela Klemenschits	(Hungary) Katalin Marosi (Brazil) Marina Tavares	3–6, 7–6^{(2)}, 6–3
Runner-up	30.	18 July 2006	Darmstadt, Germany	Clay	(Austria) Daniela Klemenschits	(Romania) Monica Niculescu (Israel) Yevgenia Savransky	1–6, 6–0, 6–1
Runner-up	31.	22 August 2006	Bielefeld, Germany	Clay	(Austria) Daniela Klemenschits	(Germany) Carmen Klaschka (Germany) Justine Ozga	6–7^{(1)}, 6–3, 6–3
Winner	20.	31 October 2006	Erding, Germany	Carpet (i)	(Austria) Daniela Klemenschits	(Germany) Carmen Klaschka (Germany) Annette Kolb	1–6, 6–3, 6–2
Winner	21.	26 August 2008	Pörtschach am Wörthersee, Austria	Clay	(Austria) Barbara Hellwig	(Slovenia) Dalila Jakupović (Ukraine) Sofiya Kovalets	2–6, 6–2, [10–7]
Winner	22.	14 January 2009	Glasgow, United Kingdom	Hard (i)	(Luxembourg) Claudine Schaul	(Netherlands) Nicolette van Uitert (Belarus) Viktoria Yemialyanava	6–3, 4–6, [10–7]
Winner	23.	24 February 2009	Biberach, Germany	Hard (i)	(Austria) Melanie Klaffner	(Germany) Kristina Barrois (Austria) Yvonne Meusburger	3–6, 6–4, [17–15]
Runner-up	32.	6 April 2009	Tourhout, Belgium	Hard (i)	(Germany) Julia Görges	(Netherlands) Michaëlla Krajicek (Belgium) Yanina Wickmayer	6–4, 6–0
Runner-up	33.	4 May 2009	Bucharest, Romania	Clay	(Germany) Julia Görges	(Romania) Irina-Camelia Begu (Romania) Simona Halep	2–6, 6–0, [12–10]
Winner	24.	26 May 2009	Grado, Italy	Clay	(Hungary) Anikó Kapros	(Argentina) Jorgelina Cravero (Georgia (country)) Anna Tatishvili	6–3, 6–0
Winner	25.	15 June 2009	Padova, Italy	Clay	(Hungary) Anikó Kapros	(Italy) Elena Pioppo (Italy) Valentina Sulpizio	7–6^{(4)}, 6–1
Winner	26.	3 August 2009	Monteroni, Italy	Clay	(Austria) Patricia Mayr-Achleitner	(Georgia (country)) Margalita Chakhnashvili (Italy) Nicole Clerico	6–3, 6–4
Winner	27.	11 August 2009	Trnava, Slovak Republic	Clay	(Czech Republic) Vladimíra Uhlířová	(Czech Republic) Michaela Paštiková (Czech Republic) Darina Šeděnková	6–4, 6–2
Winner	28.	8 September 2009	Biella, Italy	Clay	(Czech Republic) Vladimíra Uhlířová	(Belarus) Darya Kustova (Czech Republic) Renata Voráčová	4–6, 6–3, [10–6]
Winner	29.	14 September 2009	Mestre, Italy	Clay	(Italy) Romina Oprandi	(Germany) Kristina Barrois (Austria) Yvonne Meusburger	6–4, 6–1
Winner	30.	2 December 2009	Přerov, Czech Republic	Hard (i)	(Slovenia) Andreja Klepač	(Croatia) Darija Jurak (Hungary) Katalin Marosi	7–6^{(3)}, 3–6, [10–7]
Winner	31.	14 June 2010	Padova, Italy	Clay	(Slovenia) Andreja Klepač	(Italy) Claudia Giovine (Italy) Valentina Sulpizio	4–6, 6–4, [10–5]
Winner	32.	21 June 2010	Getxo, Spain	Clay	(Slovenia) Andreja Klepač	(China) Lu Jingjing (Germany) Laura Siegemund	6–0, 6–0
Winner	33.	17 August 2010	Olomouc, Czech Republic	Clay	(Austria) Patricia Mayr-Achleitner	(Czech Republic) Iveta Gerlová (Czech Republic) Lucie Kriegsmannová	6–3, 6–1
Runner-up	34.	13 September 2010	Sofia, Bulgaria	Clay	(Germany) Tatjana Maria	(Greece) Eleni Daniilidou (Germany) Jasmin Wöhr	6–3, 6–4
Runner-up	35.	6 October 2010	Barnstaple, UK	Hard (i)	(Germany) Tatjana Maria	(Czech Republic) Andrea Hlaváčková (Netherlands) Michaëlla Krajicek	7–6^{(4)}, 6–2
Winner	34.	18 October 2010	Saint-Raphaël, France	Hard (i)	(Germany) Tatjana Maria	(Spain) Estrella Cabeza Candela (Spain) Laura Pous Tió	6–2, 6–4
Winner	35.	12 April 2011	Casablanca, Morocco	Clay	(France) Kristina Mladenovic	(Poland) Magda Linette (Poland) Katarzyna Piter	6–3, 3–6, [10–8]
Winner	36.	2 August 2011	Hechingen, Germany	Clay	(Germany) Tatjana Maria	(Germany) Korina Perkovic (Germany) Laura Siegemund	4–6, 6–2, [10–7]
Runner-up	36.	24 August 2011	Istanbul, Turkey	Hard	(France) Irena Pavlovic	(France) Julie Coin (Czech Republic) Eva Hrdinová	6–4, 7–5
Runner-up	37.	25 October 2011	Barnstaple, UK	Hard (i)	(Germany) Tatjana Maria	(Czech Republic) Eva Birnerová (United Kingdom) Anne Keothavong	7–5, 6–1
Runner-up	38.	19 March 2012	La Marsa, Tunisia	Clay	(Bosnia and Herzegovina) Mervana Jugić-Salkić	(Norway) Ulrikke Eikeri (Bulgaria) Isabella Shinikova	6–3, 6–4
Winner	37.	26 June 2012	Stuttgart, Germany	Clay	(Germany) Tatjana Maria	(Slovakia) Lenka Juríková (Slovakia) Zuzana Luknárová	6–3, 6–2
Runner-up	39.	2 July 2012	Biella, Italy	Clay	(Germany) Tatjana Maria	(Czech Republic) Eva Hrdinová (Bosnia and Herzegovina) Mervana Jugić-Salkić	1–6, 6–3, [10–8]
Runner-up	40.	31 July 2012	Trnava, Slovak Republic	Clay	(Poland) Marta Domachowska	(Romania) Elena Bogdan (Czech Republic) Renata Voráčová	7–6^{(2)}, 6–4
Winner	38.	7 August 2012	Hechingen, Germany	Clay	(Bosnia and Herzegovina) Mervana Jugić-Salkić	(Russia) Natela Dzalamidze (Czech Republic) Renata Voráčová	6–2, 6–3
Runner-up	41.	13 November 2012	Zawada, Poland	Carpet (i)	(Germany) Kristina Barrois	(Czech Republic) Karolína Plíšková (Czech Republic) Kristýna Plíšková	6–3, 6–1
Winner	39.	4 June 2013	Marseille, France	Clay	(Slovenia) Andreja Klepač	(United States) Asia Muhammad (United States) Allie Will	1–6, 6–4, [10–5]
Winner	40.	2 August 2014	Plzeň, Czech Republic	Clay	(Czech Republic) Renata Voráčová	(Belarus) Lidziya Marozava (Ukraine) Anastasiya Vasylyeva	6–4, 7–5
Runner-up	42.	16 February 2015	Altenkirchen, Germany	Carpet (i)	(Germany) Tatjana Maria	(Germany) Antonia Lottner (Croatia) Ana Vrljić	4–6, 6–3, [9–11]
Runner-up	43.	16 March 2015	Seville, Spain	Clay	(Germany) Dinah Pfizenmaier	(Russia) Victoria Kan (Georgia (country)) Ekaterine Gorgodze	3–6, 2–6

== Grand Slam doubles performance timeline ==
Key
W	F	SF	QF	#R	RR	Q#	DNQ	A	NH

(W) winner; (F) finalist; (SF) semifinalist; (QF) quarterfinalist; (#R) rounds 4, 3, 2, 1; (RR) round-robin stage; (Q#) qualification round; (DNQ) did not qualify; (A) absent; (NH) not held; (SR) strike rate (events won / competed); (W–L) win–loss record.

Tournament	2009	2010	2011	2012	2013	2014	W–L
Australian Open	A	A	A	A	A	1R	0–1
French Open	A	A	1R	A	A	1R	0–2
Wimbledon	A	A	1R	Q1	2R	1R	1–3
US Open	1R	A	A	A	2R	A	1–2
