= Rinat Fatakhetdinov =

Russian footballer

Personal information
- Date of birth: 23 January 1971 (age 55)
- Place of birth: Moscow, Russian SFSR
- Height: 1.85 m (6 ft 1 in)
- Position: Forward

Youth career
- FC Dynamo Moscow

Senior career*
Years	Team	Apps	(Gls)
1989–1991	FC Iskra Smolensk	83	(13)
1992	FC Dynamo-Gazovik Tyumen	7	(0)
1992–1994	FC Vympel Rybinsk	47	(10)
- * Club domestic league appearances and goals

Rinat Fatakhetdinov (Russian: Ринат Фатахетдинов; born 23 January 1971 in Moscow) is a former Russian football player.

Fatakhetdinov played in the Russian Premier League with FC Dynamo-Gazovik Tyumen.
