= Hana Šromová =

Czech tennis player

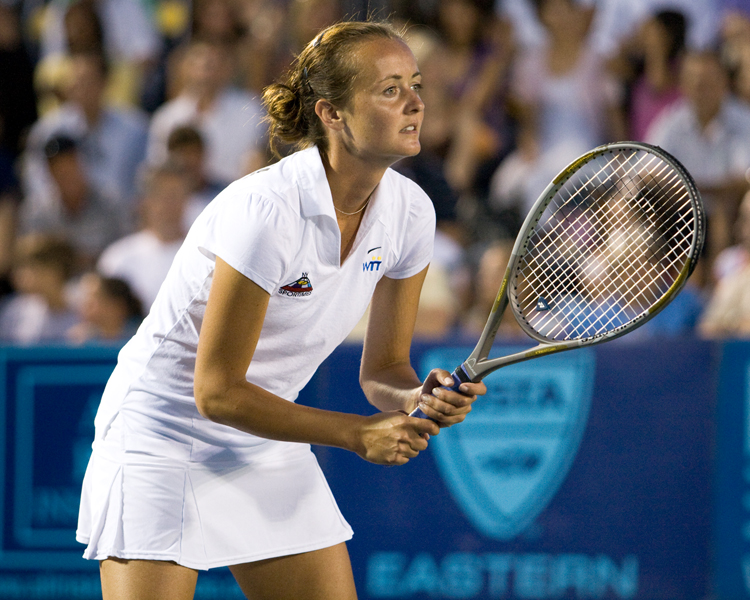
- Country (sports): Czech Republic
- Residence: Jihlava, Czech Republic
- Born: 10 April 1978 (age 48) Kopřivnice, Czechoslovakia
- Height: 1.68 m (5 ft 6 in)
- Turned pro: 1997
- Retired: 2014 (last match 2008 played)
- Plays: Right-handed (two–handed backhand)
- Prize money: $466,750

Singles
- Career record: 337–280
- Career titles: 8 ITF
- Highest ranking: No. 87 (19 June 2006)

Grand Slam singles results
- Australian Open: 2R (2006)
- French Open: 2R (2006)
- Wimbledon: 2R (2007)
- US Open: 1R (2006, 2008)

Doubles
- Career record: 325–195
- Career titles: 35 ITF
- Highest ranking: No. 63 (24 July 2006)

Grand Slam doubles results
- Australian Open: 1R (2006, 2007)
- Wimbledon: 3R (2006)
- US Open: 1R (2006)

Hana Šromová (born 10 April 1978) is a Czech former tennis player.

Šromová won eight singles and 35 doubles titles on the ITF Women's Circuit in her career. On 19 June 2006, she reached her best singles ranking of world No. 87. On 24 July 2006, she peaked at No. 63 in the doubles rankings.

== Personal ==
Šromová was coached by Lubomír Gerla for the last six years. Her father, Jiří Šrom, is a construction technician; her mother Hana is a kindergarten teacher; she has one brother, Jiří. Šromová started playing tennis at age seven, introduced to the sport by her parents, who both played tennis. Favorite surface is indoor hardcourts; biggest weapon is forehand. Most memorable experience was traveling to India for a tournament.

Šromová played her last match on the professional tour in 2008, she retired 2014.

== ITF finals ==
=== Singles (8–10) ===
$100,000 tournaments
$75,000 tournaments
$50,000 tournaments
$25,000 tournaments
$10,000 tournaments

Result	No.	Date	Tournament	Surface	Opponent	Score
Loss	1.	24 June 1996	Maribor, Slovenia	Clay	(Czech Republic) Petra Kučová	4–6, 6–4, 6–7
Loss	2.	26 May 1997	Warsaw, Poland	Clay	(Czech Republic) Libuše Průšová	2–6, 7–6, 4–6
Loss	3.	11 October 1999	Plzeň, Czech Republic	Clay	(Czech Republic) Libuše Průšová	4–6, 1–6
Loss	4.	15 November 1999	Schlieren, Switzerland	Carpet	(Netherlands) Susanne Trik	4–6, 3–6
Win	5.	24 January 2000	Hallandale Beach, United States	Hard	(United States) Dawn Buth	3–6, 6–0, 6–2
Loss	6.	28 May 2001	Doksy, Czech Republic	Clay	(Czech Republic) Jana Macurová	2–6, 6–4, 3–6
Loss	7.	29 September 2002	Trenčianske Teplice, Slovakia	Clay	(Romania) Delia Sescioreanu	5–7, 2–4 ret.
Loss	8.	14 October 2002	Giza, Egypt	Clay	(Czech Republic) Dominika Luzarová	6–7, 4–6
Win	9.	18 November 2002	Zagreb, Croatia	Hard	(Croatia) Nika Ožegović	6–2, 7–5
Win	10.	11 January 2004	Dubai, United Arab Emirates	Hard	(Russia) Goulnara Fattakhetdinova	4–6, 7–5, 6–3
Win	11.	22 March 2004	Cairo, Egypt	Clay	(Spain) Gabriela Velasco Andreu	6–3, 6–1
Win	12.	5 April 2004	Cairo, Egypt	Clay	(Germany) Annette Kolb	w/o
Win	13.	24 May 2004	Istanbul, Turkey	Hard	(Israel) Yevgenia Savransky	6–4, 6–1
Win	14.	19 July 2004	Les Contamines-Montjoie, France	Hard	(Australia) Evie Dominikovic	6–4, 6–1
Win	15.	1 November 2004	Mumbai, India	Hard	(Thailand) Montinee Tangphong	6–2, 6–1
Loss	16.	30 January 2005	Waikoloa Challenger, U.S.	Hard	(Canada) Marie-Ève Pelletier	6–4, 1–6, 4–6
Loss	17.	6 February 2005	Rockford, United States	Hard (i)	(Canada) Stéphanie Dubois	1–6, 2–6
Loss	18.	30 October 2006	Santa Cruz, Bolivia	Clay	(Argentina) Jorgelina Cravero	1–6, 7–6, 6–7

=== Doubles (35–24) ===
Result	No.	Date	Tournament	Surface	Partner	Opponents	Score
Win	1.	10 April 1995	Tampico, Mexico	Clay	(Czech Republic) Jindra Gabrisová	(United States) Ingrid Kurta (Australia) Aarthi Venkatesan	6–3, 7–6
Win	2.	29 May 1995	Katowice, Poland	Clay	(Czech Republic) Monika Kratochvílová	(Bulgaria) Galina Dimitrova (Bulgaria) Dessislava Topalova	6–3, 4–6, 6–3
Win	3.	29 July 1996	Horb, Germany	Clay	(Czech Republic) Jana Ondrouchová	(Czech Republic) Olga Vymetálková (Czech Republic) Monika Kratochvílová	6–2, 6–3
Loss	4.	9 December 1996	Přerov, Czech Republic	Carpet	(Czech Republic) Milena Nekvapilová	(Czech Republic) Kateřina Šišková (Czech Republic) Eva Melicharová	2–6, 6–7
Win	5.	20 January 1997	Istanbul, Turkey	Hard (i)	(Czech Republic) Jana Ondrouchová	(Czech Republic) Monika Maštalířová (Czech Republic) Milena Nekvapilová	6–2, 6–1
Win	6.	24 February 1997	Jaffa, Israel	Hard	(Czech Republic) Milena Nekvapilová	(Hungary) Nóra Köves (Slovakia) Patrícia Marková	6–4, 6–2
Loss	7.	3 March 1997	Tel Aviv, Israel	Hard	(Czech Republic) Milena Nekvapilová	(Netherlands) Henriëtte van Aalderen (Netherlands) Andrea van den Hurk	6–0, 3–6, 4–6
Loss	8.	14 April 1997	Dubrovnik, Croatia	Clay	(Czech Republic) Milena Nekvapilová	(Slovakia) Patrícia Marková (Slovakia) Zuzana Váleková	6–2, 5–7, 4–6
Loss	9.	21 April 1997	Prostějov, Czech Republic	Clay	(Czech Republic) Olga Vymetálková	(Czech Republic) Sylva Nesvadbova (Czech Republic) Milena Nekvapilová	2–6, 6–7
Win	10.	12 May 1997	Prešov, Slovakia	Clay	(Czech Republic) Milena Nekvapilová	(Czech Republic) Olga Vymetálková (Czech Republic) Jana Macurová	2–6, 6–4, 6–2
Win	11.	26 May 1997	Warsaw, Poland	Clay	(Czech Republic) Milena Nekvapilová	(Czech Republic) Olga Vymetálková (Czech Republic) Jana Ondrouchová	w/o
Win	12.	13 October 1997	Saint-Raphaël, France	Hard (i)	(Czech Republic) Alena Vašková	(Germany) Susi Lohrmann (Austria) Kerstin Marent	6–3, 6–3
Win	13.	20 October 1997	Joué-lès-Tours, France	Hard (i)	(Czech Republic) Milena Nekvapilová	(Denmark) Eva Dyrberg (Denmark) Maiken Pape	5–7, 6–3, 6–4
Loss	14.	2 February 1998	Istanbul, Turkey	Hard (i)	(Czech Republic) Olga Vymetálková	(Hungary) Adrienn Hegedűs (Czech Republic) Gabriela Chmelinová	4–6, 6–4, 2–6
Win	15.	30 March 1998	Athens, Greece	Clay	(Czech Republic) Milena Nekvapilová	(Czech Republic) Jana Macurová (Czech Republic) Gabriela Chmelinová	6–3, 7–5
Loss	16.	8 June 1998	Kędzierzyn-Koźle, Poland	Clay	(Czech Republic) Milena Nekvapilová	(Poland) Katharzyna Teodorowicz (Poland) Anna Bieleń-Żarska	6–7, 1–6
Loss	17.	15 June 1998	Doksy, Czech Republic	Clay	(Czech Republic) Milena Nekvapilová	(Czech Republic) Zuzana Lešenarová (Czech Republic) Lucie Steflová	3–6, 7–5, 2–6
Win	18.	10 August 1998	Bratislava, Slovakia	Clay	(Czech Republic) Milena Nekvapilová	(Czech Republic) Lenka Němečková (Slovakia) Katarína Studeníková	6–2, 6–4
Win	19.	17 May 1999	Salzburg, Austria	Clay	(Czech Republic) Milena Nekvapilová	(Belgium) Cindy Schuurmans (Czech Republic) Magdalena Zděnovcová	6–3, 6–4
Win	20.	16 August 1999	Maribor, Slovenia	Clay	(Czech Republic) Olga Vymetálková	(Slovakia) Andrea Šebová (Slovakia) Silvia Uricková	6–4, 6–3
Win	21.	8 November 1999	Stupava, Slovakia	Hard (i)	(Czech Republic) Gabriela Chmelinová	(Slovakia) Alena Paulenková (Slovakia) Radka Zrubáková	6–1, 6–0
Loss	22.	15 November 1999	Schlieren, Switzerland	Carpet	(Czech Republic) Helena Vildová	(Czech Republic) Gabriela Chmelinová (Czech Republic) Olga Vymetálková	2–6, 6–4, 5–7
Loss	23.	24 January 2000	Hallandale Beach, United States	Hard	(United States) Jean Okada	(China) Li Ting (China) Li Na	3–6, 5–7
Loss	24.	7 February 2000	Ljubljana, Slovenia	Carpet	(Czech Republic) Olga Vymetálková	(Hungary) Adrienn Hegedűs (Belarus) Nadejda Ostrovskaya	5–7, 3–6
Win	25.	19 June 2000	Sopot, Poland	Clay	(Czech Republic) Milena Nekvapilová	(Germany) Marketa Kochta (Czech Republic) Ludmila Richterová	6–3, 6–2
Win	26.	28 May 2001	Doksy, Czech Republic	Clay	(Czech Republic) Milena Nekvapilová	(Czech Republic) Olga Vymetálková (Czech Republic) Gabriela Chmelinová	2–6, 6–4, 6–1
Win	27.	18 June 2001	Gorizia, Italy	Clay	(Czech Republic) Milena Nekvapilová	(Ukraine) Tatiana Kovalchuk (Romania) Andreea Ehritt-Vanc	5–7, 6–1, 6–1
Loss	28.	25 June 2001	Mont-de-Marsan, France	Clay	(Czech Republic) Renata Kučerová	(Netherlands) Anousjka van Exel (Slovakia) Zuzana Váleková	1–6, 1–6
Loss	29.	9 July 2001	Darmstadt, Germany	Clay	(Czech Republic) Milena Nekvapilová	(Germany) Magdalena Kučerová (Germany) Lydia Steinbach	1–6, 2–6
Loss	30.	6 August 2001	Rimini, Italy	Clay	(Czech Republic) Milena Nekvapilová	(Hungary) Petra Mandula (Austria) Patricia Wartusch	2–6, 1–6
Loss	31.	22 October 2001	Opole, Poland	Carpet (i)	(Czech Republic) Milena Nekvapilová	(Germany) Magdalena Kučerová (Germany) Lydia Steinbach	3–6, 2–6
Win	32.	5 November 2001	Cairo, Egypt	Clay	(Czech Republic) Milena Nekvapilová	(Czech Republic) Zuzana Hejdová (Slovakia) Gabriela Voleková	6–3, 6–2
Win	33.	10 June 2002	Grado, Italy	Clay	(Italy) Gloria Pizzichini	(Federal Republic of Yugoslavia) Sandra Načuk (Madagascar) Natacha Randriantefy	6–3, 7–5
Loss	34.	8 August 2002	Valašské Meziříčí, Czech Republic	Clay	(Czech Republic) Milena Nekvapilová	(Czech Republic) Renata Kučerová (Czech Republic) Gabriela Chmelinová	4–6, 1–6
Loss	35.	23 September 2002	Sopron, Hungary	Clay	(Czech Republic) Milena Nekvapilová	(Austria) Daniela Klemenschits (Austria) Sandra Klemenschits	7–6, 2–6, 2–6
Loss	36.	29 September 2002	Trenčianske Teplice, Slovakia	Clay	(Czech Republic) Milena Nekvapilová	(Czech Republic) Jana Macurová (Czech Republic) Gabriela Chmelinová	2–1 ret.
Win	37.	6 October 2002	Ain Sukhna, Egypt	Clay	(Ukraine) Olena Antypina	(Slovenia) Kim Kambic (France) Aurélie Védy	6–2, 7–5
Win	38.	20 October 2002	Mansoura, Egypt	Clay	(Ukraine) Olena Antypina	(Russia) Goulnara Fattakhetdinova (Kazakhstan) Galina Voskoboeva	6–2, 6–2
Loss	39.	6 October 2003	Ciudad Juárez, Mexico	Clay	(Czech Republic) Jana Hlaváčková	(Spain) Lourdes Domínguez Lino (Spain) Nuria Llagostera Vives	4–6, 6–2, 6–3
Loss	40.	20 October 2003	Opole, Poland	Carpet (i)	(Czech Republic) Zuzana Hejdová	(Czech Republic) Olga Vymetálková (Czech Republic) Gabriela Chmelinová	4–6, 3–6
Win	41.	2 November 2003	Mumbai, India	Hard	(Czech Republic) Gabriela Chmelinová	(India) Rushmi Chakravarthi (India) Sai Jayalakshmy Jayaram	6–1, 6–1
Win	42.	11 January 2004	Dubai, United Arab Emirates	Hard	(Russia) Goulnara Fattakhetdinova	(Austria) Daniela Klemenschits (Austria) Sandra Klemenschits	6–3, 4–6, 6–4
Win	43.	22 March 2004	Cairo, Egypt	Clay	(Czech Republic) Eva Martincová	(Russia) Raissa Gourevitch (Russia) Ekaterina Kozhokina	6–1, 6–0
Win	44.	5 April 2004	Cairo, Egypt	Clay	(Czech Republic) Simona Dobrá	(Sweden) Helena Ejeson (Germany) Annette Kolb	w/o
Loss	45.	24 May 2004	Istanbul, Turkey	Hard	(Spain) Gabriela Velasco Andreu	(Belarus) Iryna Kuryanovich (Israel) Yevgenia Savransky	3–6, 4–6
Win	46.	20 September 2004	Jounieh, Lebanon	Hard	(Czech Republic) Petra Cetkovská	(Spain) Nuria Llagostera Vives (Portugal) Frederica Piedade	6–4, 6–2
Win	47.	26 October 2004	Istanbul, Turkey	Hard (i)	(Ukraine) Olena Antypina	(Turkey) İpek Şenoğlu (Germany) Kathrin Wörle-Scheller	6–7^{(5–7)}, 6–3, 7–5
Loss	48.	1 November 2004	Mumbai, India	Hard	(Croatia) Maria Abramović	(Uzbekistan) Akgul Amanmuradova (India) Sai Jayalakshmy Jayaram	6–4, 4–6, 4–6
Win	49.	11 July 2005	Vittel, France	Clay	(Czech Republic) Renata Voráčová	(Slovakia) Stanislava Hrozenská (Czech Republic) Lenka Němečková	6–4, 6–4
Loss	50.	19 September 2005	Jounieh, Lebanon	Hard	(Ukraine) Olena Antypina	(Ukraine) Mariya Koryttseva (Belarus) Anastasiya Yakimova	5–7, 2–6
Win	51.	13 December 2005	Dubai, United Arab Emirates	Hard	(Czech Republic) Gabriela Chmelinová	(Russia) Ekaterina Makarova (Russia) Olga Panova	7–5, 6–4
Win	52.	25 April 2006	Lafayette, United States	Clay	(Venezuela) Milagros Sequera	(Ukraine) Yuliana Fedak (Czech Republic) Eva Hrdinová	2–6, 6–1, 6–1
Win	53.	12 June 2006	Zagreb, Croatia	Clay	(Czech Republic) Michaela Paštiková	(Czech Republic) Olga Vymetálková (Czech Republic) Lucie Hradecká	w/o
Win	54.	7 November 2006	Toronto, Canada	Hard (i)	(Germany) Angelika Bachmann	(Canada) Heidi El Tabakh (Romania) Raluca Olaru	6–4, 6–1
Win	55.	21 November 2006	Puebla, Mexico	Hard	(Brazil) Maria Fernanda Alves	(Croatia) Ivana Abramović (Croatia) Maria Abramović	6–4, 6–3
Win	56.	29 November 2006	San Diego, United States	Hard	(Croatia) Ivana Abramović	(United States) Christina Fusano (United States) Aleke Tsoubanos	6–4, 6–3
Loss	57.	3 April 2007	Pelham, United States	Clay	(Czech Republic) Michaela Paštiková	(United States) Carly Gullickson (Australia) Nicole Kriz	2–6, 6–2, 0–6
Loss	58.	11 June 2007	Zlín, Czech Republic	Hard	(Czech Republic) Michaela Paštiková	(Czech Republic) Lucie Hradecká (Czech Republic) Renata Voráčová	2–6, 6–2, 4–6
Win	59.	5 May 2008	Bucharest, Romania	Clay	(Czech Republic) Petra Cetkovská	(Romania) Sorana Cîrstea (Romania) Ágnes Szatmári	6–4, 7–5

== Grand Slam performance timelines ==
Key
W	F	SF	QF	#R	RR	Q#	DNQ	A	NH

(W) winner; (F) finalist; (SF) semifinalist; (QF) quarterfinalist; (#R) rounds 4, 3, 2, 1; (RR) round-robin stage; (Q#) qualification round; (DNQ) did not qualify; (A) absent; (NH) not held; (SR) strike rate (events won / competed); (W–L) win–loss record.

=== Singles ===
Tournament	2001	2002	2003	2004	2005	2006	2007	2008	W-L
Australian Open	Q1	A	A	A	Q1	2R	Q1	A	1–1
French Open	A	A	A	A	Q2	2R	Q1	Q2	1–1
Wimbledon	A	A	A	A	Q1	1R	2R	Q2	1–2
US Open	A	A	Q1	A	Q2	1R	Q2	1R	0–2
Win–loss	0–0	0–0	0–0	0–0	0–0	2–4	1–1	0–1	3–6

=== Doubles ===
Tournament	2006	2007	W-L
Australian Open	1R	1R	0–2
French Open	A	A	0–0
Wimbledon	3R	1R	2–2
US Open	1R	A	0–1
Win–loss	2–3	0–2	2–5
