= Galina Fokina =

Russian tennis player

- Country (sports): Russia
- Residence: Moscow
- Born: 17 January 1984 (age 41); Moscow
- Height: 1.65 m (5 ft 5 in)
- Turned pro: 1999
- Retired: 2013
- Plays: Left-handed (two-handed backhand)
- Prize money: $198,138

Singles
- Career record: 213–137
- Career titles: 11 ITF
- Highest ranking: No. 168 (27 May 2002)

Grand Slam singles results
- Australian Open: Q2 (2003)
- French Open: Q2 (2002)
- Wimbledon: Q2 (2003)
- US Open: Q2 (2003)

Doubles
- Career record: 182–104
- Career titles: 24 ITF
- Highest ranking: No. 79 (22 April 2002)

Grand Slam doubles results
- Australian Open: 2R (2002)
- French Open: 2R (2002)
- Wimbledon: 1R (2002)
- US Open: 1R (2002)

Galina Fokina (Галина Фокина) (born 17 January 1984) is a Russian former tennis player.

Fokina has won a total of 35 titles on the ITF Women's Circuit. Her career-high WTA rankings are world number 168 in singles and number 79 in doubles, both achieved in 2002.

In 2004, she took part in the Hyderabad Open but lost in the second round of the WTA Tour event to Marion Bartoli.

Fokina retired from professional tennis in 2013.

== WTA Tour finals ==
=== Doubles: 1 (runner-up) ===
Winner - Legend
Tier I (0–0)
Tier II (0–0)
Tier III (0–0)
Tier IV & V (0–1)

Result	Date	Tournament	Surface	Partner	Opponents	Score
Loss	16 June 2002	Tashkent Open, Uzbekistan	Hard	(Germany) Mia Buric	(Ukraine) Tatiana Perebiynis (Belarus) Tatiana Poutchek	5–7, 2–6

== ITF Circuit finals ==
=== Singles (11–5) ===
Legend
$75,000 tournaments
$50,000 tournaments
$25,000 tournaments
$10,000 tournaments

Result	No.	Date	Location	Surface	Opponent	Score
Loss	1.	10 February 2002	Redbridge, UK	Hard (i)	(Czech Republic) Zuzana Ondrášková	7–5, 2–6, 5–7
Loss	2.	9 February 2003	Doha, Qatar	Hard	(Lithuania) Aurelija Misevičiūtė	4–6, 6–4, 4–6
Win	1.	6 December 2004	Cairo, Egypt	Clay	(France) Pauline Parmentier	6–4, 6–3
Loss	3.	20 March 2005	Cairo, Egypt	Clay	(Romania) Monica Niculescu	4–6, 2–6
Win	2.	20 November 2005	Giza, Egypt	Clay	(Bulgaria) Biljana Pawlowa-Dimitrova	6–2, 7–5
Win	3.	4 December 2005	Giza, Egypt	Clay	(Austria) Stefanie Haidner	6–2, 6–4
Win	4.	19 March 2006	Cairo, Egypt	Clay	(Italy) Silvia Disderi	7–5, 6–3
Win	5.	2 April 2006	Cairo, Egypt	Clay	(Romania) Corina Corduneanu	5–7, 6–4, 6–1
Win	6.	3 December 2006	Cairo, Egypt	Clay	(France) Émilie Bacquet	6–2, 7–6^{(10–8)}
Loss	4.	17 March 2007	Cairo, Egypt	Clay (i)	(Romania) Anamaria Sere	6–3, 3–6, 3–6
Win	7.	25 March 2007	Cairo, Egypt	Clay (i)	(Netherlands) Michelle Gerards	6–2, 6–2
Win	8.	1 April 2007	Cairo, Egypt	Clay	(Russia) Oksana Karyshkova	3–6, 6–3, 7–5
Win	9.	15 March 2009	Giza, Egypt	Clay	(Georgia (country)) Oksana Kalashnikova	6–4, 6–2
Win	10.	17 May 2009	Ain Sokhna, Egypt	Clay	(Spain) Laura Pous Tió	7–6^{(7–2)}, 7–5
Loss	5.	21 June 2009	Istanbul, Turkey	Hard	(Turkey) Çağla Büyükakçay	2–6, 3–6
Win	11.	25 July 2009	Casablanca, Morocco	Clay	(Switzerland) Lisa Sabino	6–1, 6–2

=== Doubles (24–12) ===
Result	No.	Date	Location	Surface	Partner	Opponents	Score
Win	1.	24 September 2000	Moscow, Russia	Carpet (i)	(Russia) Raissa Gourevitch	(Belarus) Darya Kustova (Russia) Alexandra Zerkalova	6–1, 6–0
Win	2.	26 May 2001	Guimarães, Portugal	Hard	(Brazil) Vanessa Menga	(Czech Republic) Lenka Cenková (Czech Republic) Magdalena Zděnovcová	6–2, 6–1
Win	3.	21 July 2001	Modena, Italy	Clay	(Belarus) Nadejda Ostrovskaya	(Argentina) Eugenia Chialvo (Spain) Conchita Martínez Granados	6–3, 6–2
Win	4.	18 November 2001	Stupava, Slovakia	Hard (i)	(Hungary) Eszter Molnár	(Czech Republic) Petra Cetkovská (Czech Republic) Libuše Průšová	6–3, 6–4
Loss	1.	16 February 2002	Sutton, Great Britain	Hard (i)	(Estonia) Maret Ani	(Austria) Sylvia Plischke (Serbia and Montenegro) Dragana Zarić	5–7, 3–6
Win	5.	20 July 2002	Modena, Italy	Clay	(Ukraine) Yuliana Fedak	(Argentina) Gisela Dulko (Spain) Conchita Martínez Granados	6–1, 6–3
Win	6.	8 February 2003	Doha, Qatar	Hard	(Russia) Goulnara Fattakhetdinova	(Germany) Adriana Barna (Germany) Scarlett Werner	6–4, 6–3
Win	7.	30 March 2003	Saint Petersburg, Russia	Hard (i)	(Russia) Goulnara Fattakhetdinova	(Russia) Irina Bulykina (Belarus) Elena Yaryshka	6–0, 6–3
Loss	2.	7 April 2003	Dinan, France	Clay (i)	(Russia) Goulnara Fattakhetdinova	(Czech Republic) Gabriela Chmelinová (Czech Republic) Michaela Paštiková	6–1, 2–6, 3–6
Win	8.	14 June 2003	Marseille, France	Clay	(Ukraine) Yuliana Fedak	(Romania) Andreea Ehritt-Vanc (Czech Republic) Renata Voráčová	6–4, 6–7^{(3–7)}, 6–3
Loss	3.	28 September 2003	Batumi, Georgia	Hard	(Russia) Goulnara Fattakhetdinova	(Belarus) Darya Kustova (Ukraine) Elena Tatarkova	6–1, 1–6, 2–6
Win	9.	4 July 2004	Orbetello, Italy	Clay	(Ukraine) Alona Bondarenko	(Romania) Andreea Ehritt-Vanc (Ukraine) Yuliana Fedak	6–7^{(5–7)}, 6–2, 7–5
Win	10.	25 July 2004	Innsbruck, Austria	Clay	(Ukraine) Alona Bondarenko	(Slovakia) Stanislava Hrozenská (Czech Republic) Lenka Němečková	6–2, 6–4
Win	11.	26 September 2004	Batumi, Georgia	Hard	(Ukraine) Alona Bondarenko	(Russia) Anna Bastrikova (Russia) Irina Kotkina	6–2, 6–2
Loss	4.	27 November 2004	Cairo, Egypt	Clay	(Russia) Raissa Gourevitch	(Czech Republic) Petra Cetkovská (France) Pauline Parmentier	4–6, 2–6
Loss	5.	4 December 2004	Cairo, Egypt	Clay	(Russia) Raissa Gourevitch	(Serbia and Montenegro) Katarina Mišić (Serbia and Montenegro) Dragana Zarić	5–7, 4–6
Loss	6.	11 December 2004	Cairo, Egypt	Clay	(Russia) Raissa Gourevitch	(Serbia and Montenegro) Katarina Mišić (Serbia and Montenegro) Dragana Zarić	2–6, 2–6
Win	12.	2 April 2005	Cairo, Egypt	Clay	(Russia) Raissa Gourevitch	(Ukraine) Kateryna Herth (Ukraine) Maryna Khomenko	6–2, 6–1
Win	13.	19 November 2005	Giza, Egypt	Clay	(Russia) Raissa Gourevitch	(South Africa) Lizaan du Plessis (Netherlands) Leonie Mekel	6–3, 6–1
Win	14.	22 November 2005	Giza, Egypt	Clay	(Russia) Raissa Gourevitch	(Italy) Emilia Desiderio (Austria) Stefanie Haidner	6–4, 6–3
Win	15.	3 December 2005	Giza, Egypt	Clay	(Russia) Raissa Gourevitch	(Romania) Lenore Lazaroiu (Bulgaria) Biljana Pawlowa-Dimitrova	6–3, 7–5
Win	16.	1 April 2006	Cairo, Egypt	Clay	(Russia) Raissa Gourevitch	(Romania) Laura Ioana Andrei (Serbia) Vojislava Lukic	7–6^{(7–2)}, 5–7, 6–4
Win	17.	24 March 2007	Cairo, Egypt	Clay (i)	(Russia) Elina Gasanova	(Italy) Anna Floris (Italy) Valentina Sulpizio	7–5, 6–1
Win	18.	31 March 2007	Cairo, Egypt	Clay	(Egypt) Yasmin Hamza	(Romania) Laura Ioana Andrei (Romania) Antonia Xenia Tout	6–0, 2–6, 6–1
Win	19.	15 March 2008	Cairo, Egypt	Clay	(Georgia (country)) Oksana Kalashnikova	(Russia) Elena Chalova (Russia) Inna Sokolova	6–4, 6–2
Win	20.	29 March 2008	Cairo, Egypt	Clay	(Georgia (country)) Oksana Kalashnikova	(Russia) Anna Savitskaya (Netherlands) Bibiane Schoofs	7–6^{(7–4)}, 6–4
Win	21.	14 March 2009	Giza, Egypt	Clay	(Ukraine) Alyona Sotnikova	(Poland) Sandra Zaniewska (Netherlands) Bibiane Schoofs	6–4, 3–6, [10–8]
Loss	7.	16 May 2009	Ain Sokhna, Egypt	Clay	(Russia) Anna Morgina	(Egypt) Yasmin Ebada (Spain) Laura Pous Tió	4–6, 6–2, [5–10]
Loss	8.	23 May 2009	Ain Sokhna, Egypt	Clay	(Russia) Anna Morgina	(Sweden) Anna Brazhnikova (Russia) Valeria Savinykh	6–3, 3–6, [6–10]
Win	22.	20 June 2009	İstanbul, Turkey	Hard	(Russia) Anna Morgina	(Turkey) Çağla Büyükakçay (Turkey) Pemra Özgen	6–4, 4–6, [10–8]
Win	23.	18 July 2009	Casablanca, Morocco	Clay	(Russia) Anna Morgina	(Italy) Benedetta Davato (Switzerland) Lisa Sabino	7–6^{(7–5)}, 0–6, [10–6]
Loss	9.	22 November 2009	Cairo, Egypt	Clay	(Oman) Fatma Al-Nabhani	(Romania) Mihaela Buzărnescu (France) Laura Thorpe	4–6, 0–6
Loss	10.	3 April 2010	Cairo, Egypt	Clay	(Russia) Elina Gasanova	(Czech Republic) Iveta Gerlová (Czech Republic) Lucie Kriegsmannová	4–6, 3–6
Loss	11.	22 July 2010	Casablanca, Morocco	Clay	(Russia) Anna Morgina	(Slovakia) Katarína Baranová (Tunisia) Ons Jabeur	3–6, 3–6
Win	24.	4 December 2010	Ain Sokhna, Egypt	Clay	(Russia) Marina Melnikova	(Italy) Indra Bigi (Italy) Nicole Clerico	6–3, 2–6, [13–11]
Loss	12.	11 December 2010	Ain Sokhna, Egypt	Clay	(Russia) Marina Melnikova	(Ukraine) Sofiya Kovalets (South Africa) Chanel Simmonds	1–6, 2–6
