= Adrienn Hegedűs =

Hungarian tennis player

- Country (sports): Hungary
- Born: 26 December 1977 (age 47); Budapest, Hungary
- Prize money: $64,950

Singles
- Career record: 181–120
- Career titles: 11 ITF
- Highest ranking: No. 178 (24 September 2001)

Grand Slam singles results
- US Open: Q1 (2001)

Doubles
- Career record: 85–79
- Career titles: 7 ITF
- Highest ranking: No. 202 (27 December 1999)

Adrienn Hegedűs (born 26 December 1977) is a Hungarian former tennis player. In her career, she won a total of 18 titles on the ITF Women's Circuit. On 24 September 2001, she reached her career-high singles ranking of world No. 178.

In April 1998, Hegedűs played two doubles rubbers for the Hungary Fed Cup team losing both of them.

== ITF Circuit finals ==
=== Singles: 13 (11 titles, 2 runner-ups) ===
Legend $50,000 tournaments $25,000 tournaments $10,000 tournaments	Finals by surface Hard (3–0) Clay (7–1) Carpet (1–1)

Result	No.	Date	Tournaments	Surface	Opponent	Score
Win	1.	9 February 1997	ITF Reykjavík, Iceland	Carpet (i)	(Switzerland) Marylene Losey	6–2, 6–4
Win	2.	26 May 1997	ITF Brixen im Thale, Austria	Clay	(Germany) Adriana Barna	6–3, 6–3
Win	3.	24 August 1997	ITF Samut Prakan, Thailand	Hard	(Thailand) Suvimol Duangchan	6–4, 6–4
Win	4.	31 August 1997	ITF Bangkok, Thailand	Hard	(South Korea) Kim Eun-kyung	6–0, 6–3
Loss	1.	8 February 1998	ITF Istanbul, Turkey	Carpet (i)	(United Kingdom) Abigail Tordoff	3–6, 3–6
Win	5.	23 August 1998	ITF Maribor, Slovenia	Clay	(Hungary) Katalin Miskolczi	7–5, 6–2
Win	6.	28 March 1999	ITF Petroupoli, Greece	Clay	(North Macedonia) Marina Lazarovska	7–5, 6–3
Win	7.	23 April 2000	ITF Filothei, Greece	Clay	(North Macedonia) Marina Lazarovska	7–6^{(7–2)}, 6–1
Loss	2.	3 September 2000	ITF Plzeň, Czech Republic	Clay	(Czech Republic) Alena Vašková	4–5^{(7–9)}, 2–4, 1–4
Win	8.	1 October 2000	ITF Antalya, Turkey	Clay	(Belarus) Elena Yaryshka	7–6^{(7–4)}, 7–5
Win	9.	5 November 2000	ITF Cairo, Egypt	Clay	(Austria) Daniela Klemenschits	4–0, 4–0, 5–3
Win	10.	12 November 2000	ITF Mansoura, Egypt	Clay	(Italy) Giulia Meruzzi	4–2, 5–3, 4–1
Win	11.	5 August 2001	ITF Alghero, Italy	Hard	(Italy) Flavia Pennetta	6–4, 6–4

=== Doubles: 18 (7 titles, 11 runner-ups) ===
Legend $50,000 tournaments $25,000 tournaments $10,000 tournaments	Finals by surface Hard (1–3) Clay (2–5) Carpet (4–3)

Result	No.	Date	Tournaments	Surface	Partner	Opponents	Score
Loss	1.	8 February 1997	ITF Reykjavík, Iceland	Carpet (i)	(Hungary) Nóra Köves	(Finland) Linda Jansson (Sweden) Annica Lindstedt	6–4, 1–6, 2–6
Loss	2.	11 October 1997	ITF Thessaloniki, Greece	Hard	(Hungary) Nóra Köves	(Italy) Katia Altilia (Denmark) Charlotte Aagaard	6–7^{(5–7)}, 1–6
Win	1.	6 February 1998	ITF Istanbul, Turkey	Carpet (i)	(Czech Republic) Gabriela Navrátilová	(Czech Republic) Olga Blahotová (Czech Republic) Hana Šromová	6–4, 4–6, 6–2
Loss	3.	11 July 1998	ITF Fiumicino, Italy	Clay	(Japan) Tomoe Hotta	(Italy) Alessia Lombardi (Romania) Andreea Ehritt-Vanc	2–6, 4–6
Win	2.	7 March 1999	ITF Buchen, Germany	Carpet (i)	(Poland) Anna Bieleń-Żarska	(Germany) Angelika Bachmann (Germany) Lisa Fritz	6–4, 6–2
Loss	4.	26 March 1999	ITF Petroupoli, Greece	Clay	(Germany) Vanessa Henke	(Netherlands) Andrea van den Hurk (Netherlands) Jolanda Mens	4–6, 3–6
Loss	5.	10 July 1999	ITF Amersfoort, Netherlands	Clay	(Austria) Stefanie Haidner	(Netherlands) Natasha Galouza (Netherlands) Debby Haak	6–7^{(2–7)}, 4–6
Loss	6.	25 September 1999	ITF Thessaloniki, Greece	Carpet	(Germany) Adriana Barna	(South Africa) Surina De Beer (Greece) Eleni Daniilidou	2–6, 3–6
Win	3.	12 February 2000	ITF Ljubljana, Slovenia	Carpet (i)	(Belarus) Nadejda Ostrovskaya	(Czech Republic) Olga Blahotová (Czech Republic) Hana Šromová	7–5, 6–3
Win	4.	27 February 2000	ITF Buchen, Germany	Carpet (i)	(Netherlands) Maaike Koutstaal	(Germany) Magdalena Kučerová (Czech Republic) Ludmila Richterová	6–4, 6–2
Loss	7.	21 April 2000	ITF Filothei, Greece	Clay	(Hungary) Kinga Berecz	(Romania) Magda Mihalache (Switzerland) Aliénor Tricerri	2–6, 7–5, 5–7
Win	5.	27 May 2000	ITF Biella, Italy	Clay	(Germany) Kirstin Freye	(Slovakia) Eva Fislová (Czech Republic) Zuzana Hejdová	6–2, 6–4
Win	6.	23 September 2000	ITF Antalya, Turkey	Hard	(Germany) Bianca Cremer	(Slovenia) Maša Vesenjak (Slovenia) Urška Vesenjak	6–4, 6–4
Loss	8.	30 September 2000	ITF Antalya, Turkey	Clay	(Germany) Bianca Cremer	(Slovenia) Maša Vesenjak (Slovenia) Urška Vesenjak	1–6, 6–2, 2–6
Win	7.	11 November 2000	ITF Mansoura, Egypt	Clay	(Austria) Daniela Klemenschits	(Italy) Giulia Meruzzi (Italy) Monica Scartoni	5–4^{(7–5)}, 4–2, 4–0
Loss	9.	11 March 2001	ITF Buchen, Germany	Carpet (i)	(Hungary) Eszter Molnár	(Austria) Daniela Klemenschits (Austria) Sandra Klemenschits	6–7^{(5–7)}, 6–7^{(8–10)}
Loss	10.	28 April 2001	ITF Seoul, South Korea	Hard	(Germany) Angelika Bachmann	(South Korea) Kim Eun-ha (Indonesia) Wynne Prakusya	3–6, 2–6
Loss	11.	21 July 2001	ITF Valladolid, Spain	Hard	(Hungary) Eszter Molnár	(Germany) Nina Dübbers (Italy) Francesca Lubiani	2–6, 6–7^{(4–7)}

== Fed Cup participation ==
=== Doubles ===
Edition	Stage	Date	Location	Against	Surface	Partner	Opponents	W/L	Score
1998 Fed Cup	E/A Zone Group I	14 April 1998	Murcia, Spain	Sweden	Clay	(Hungary) Zsófia Gubacsi	(Sweden) Åsa Carlsson (Sweden) Kristina Triska	L	4–6, 3–6
1998 Fed Cup	E/A Zone Group I	15 April 1998	Murcia, Spain	Ukraine	Clay	(Hungary) Petra Gáspár	(Ukraine) Tatiana Kovalchuk (Ukraine) Elena Tatarkova	L	4–6, 7–6^{(10–8)}, 3–6
