= Daniela Klemenschits =

Austrian tennis player (1982–2008)

- Country (sports): Austria
- Born: 13 November 1982 Vienna, Austria
- Died: 9 April 2008 (aged 25) Salzburg, Austria
- Turned pro: 1996
- Retired: 2006
- Plays: Right-handed
- Prize money: $72,257

Singles
- Career record: 80–91
- Highest ranking: No. 356 (9 July 2001)

Doubles
- Career record: 234–155
- Career titles: 23 ITF
- Highest ranking: No. 95 (22 August 2005)

Daniela Klemenschits (13 November 1982 – 9 April 2008) was an Austrian professional tennis player. She won a total of 23 doubles titles on the ITF Circuit in her career.

== Early life ==
Daniela and twin sister Sandra (fellow pro-player) were born in Vienna, Austria.

== Tennis career ==
Daniela played doubles with sister Sandra on the WTA Tour and the ITF Women's Circuit. The team dominated doubles tennis in Austria in the mid-2000s, becoming the country's No. 1 team in 2006. Daniela won a total of 23 titles on the ITF-level and reached one final on the WTA Tour-level. She reached the top 100 of the WTA doubles rankings in 2005. Daniela also represented Austria on the Fed Cup in 2005, when they defeated Switzerland.

Daniela played her final professional match on 14 December 2006 in Valašské Meziříčí, Czech Republic, partnering sister Sandra and losing in round one against Eva Hrdinová and Stanislava Hrozenská, 5–7, 2–6.

== Death ==
In January 2007, both Klemenschits twins were diagnosed with a rare form of abdominal cancer, squamous cell carcinoma, forcing their retirement. Fellow tennis players rallied for Klemenschits and donated money to pay for the removal of several tumours and the expensive medical care required. Daniela died on 9 April 2008 in Salzburg, aged 25. Sandra, however, survived and returned to the doubles tour in July 2008.

== WTA Tour finals ==
=== Doubles: 1 (runner-up) ===
| Legend Grand Slam tournaments Premier M & Premier 5 Premier International (0–1) | Finals by surface Hard (0–1) Clay (0–0) Grass (0–0) Carpet (0–0) |

| Outcome | Date | Tournament | Surface | Partner | Opponents | Score |
|---|---|---|---|---|---|---|
| Runner-up | 21 May 2005 | İstanbul Cup, Turkey | Hard | (Austria) Sandra Klemenschits | (Spain) Marta Marrero (Italy) Antonella Serra Zanetti | 4–6, 0–6 |

== ITF finals ==
Legend
$75,000 tournaments
$25,000 tournaments
$10,000 tournaments

=== Singles: 4 (0–4) ===
| Outcome | No. | Date | Tournament | Surface | Opponent | Score |
|---|---|---|---|---|---|---|
| Runner-up | 1. | 9 October 2000 | ITF Cairo, Egypt | Clay | (Switzerland) Aliénor Tricerri | 4–5, 0–5, 2–4 |
| Runner-up | 2. | 5 November 2000 | ITF Cairo, Egypt | Clay | (Hungary) Adrienn Hegedűs | 0–4, 0–4, 3–5 |
| Runner-up | 3. | 3 December 2000 | ITF Arad, Israel | Hard | (United Kingdom) Hannah Collin | 3–5, 0–4, 0–4 |
| Runner-up | 4. | 13 May 2001 | ITF Tortosa, Spain | Clay | (France) Capucine Rousseau | 3–6, 0–6 |

=== Doubles: 56 (23–33) ===
| Outcome | No. | Date | Tournament | Surface | Partner | Opponents | Score |
|---|---|---|---|---|---|---|---|
| Winner | 1. | 31 July 2000 | ITF Rabat, Morocco | Clay | (Austria) Sandra Klemenschits | (Austria) Bianca Kamper (Russia) Ekaterina Kozhokina | 7–6^{(4)}, 6–0 |
| Runner-up | 1. | 21 August 2000 | ITF Kastoria, Greece | Carpet | (Austria) Sandra Klemenschits | (Greece) Eleni Daniilidou (Greece) Evagelia Roussi | 3–6, 4–6 |
| Winner | 2. | 2 October 2000 | ITF Cairo, Egypt | Clay | (Austria) Sandra Klemenschits | (Slovakia) Andrea Masaryková (Switzerland) Aliénor Tricerri | 4–1, 4–1, 4–2 |
| Winner | 3. | 9 October 2000 | ITF Cairo, Egypt | Clay | (Austria) Sandra Klemenschits | (Slovakia) Barbora Blahutiaková (Slovakia) Zuzana Kučová | 4–0, 4–0, 4–0 |
| Runner-up | 2. | 30 October 2000 | ITF Cairo, Egypt | Clay | (Japan) Ayako Suzuki | (Slovakia) Katarína Bašternáková (Slovakia) Alena Paulenková | 4–1, 4–5, 1–4 |
| Winner | 4. | 11 November 2000 | ITF Mansoura, Egypt | Clay | (Hungary) Adrienn Hegedűs | (Italy) Giulia Meruzzi (Italy) Monica Scartoni | 5–4^{(5)}, 4–2, 4–0 |
| Winner | 5. | 18 November 2000 | ITF Beersheba, Israel | Hard | (Austria) Sandra Klemenschits | (Italy) Giulia Meruzzi (Netherlands) Leonne Muller Van Moppe | 4–0, 4–0, 5–3 |
| Runner-up | 3. | 27 November 2000 | ITF Arad, Israel | Hard | (Austria) Sandra Klemenschits | (Italy) Giulia Meruzzi (Netherlands) Leonne Muller Van Moppe | 4–5^{(4)}, 1–4, 2–4 |
| Runner-up | 4. | 12 February 2001 | ITF Faro, Portugal | Hard | (Austria) Sandra Klemenschits | (Czech Republic) Olga Vymetálková (Czech Republic) Gabriela Navrátilová | 0–6, 2–6 |
| Winner | 6. | 5 March 2001 | ITF Buchen, Germany | Carpet (i) | (Austria) Sandra Klemenschits | (Hungary) Adrienn Hegedűs (Hungary) Eszter Molnár | 7–6^{(5)}, 7–6^{(8)} |
| Winner | 7. | 2 April 2001 | ITF Athens, Greece | Clay | (Austria) Sandra Klemenschits | (Croatia) Marijana Kovačević (Bulgaria) Biljana Pawlowa-Dimitrova | 6–3, 7–5 |
| Winner | 8. | 16 April 2001 | ITF Belgrade, Yugoslavia | Clay | (Austria) Sandra Klemenschits | (Federal Republic of Yugoslavia) Dragana Ilić (Federal Republic of Yugoslavia) Ana Timotić | 6–2, 6–1 |
| Runner-up | 5. | 23 April 2001 | ITF Bournemouth, United Kingdom | Clay | (Austria) Sandra Klemenschits | (Japan) Maki Arai (United Kingdom) Julia Smith | 7–6^{(4)}, 3–6, 3–6 |
| Winner | 9. | 7 May 2001 | ITF Tortosa, Spain | Clay | (Austria) Sandra Klemenschits | (France) Séverine Beltrame (France) Capucine Rousseau | 6–3, 6–3 |
| Runner-up | 6. | 28 May 2001 | ITF Biella, Italy | Clay | (Austria) Sandra Klemenschits | (Brazil) Joana Cortez (Brazil) Vanessa Menga | 6–7^{(4)}, 6–4, 3–6 |
| Runner-up | 7. | 23 June 2001 | ITF Båstad, Sweden | Clay | (Austria) Sandra Klemenschits | (New Zealand) Leanne Baker (India) Manisha Malhotra | 3–6, 1–6 |
| Runner-up | 8. | 6 August 2001 | Ladies Open Hechingen, Germany | Clay | (Austria) Sandra Klemenschits | (Germany) Magdalena Kučerová (Germany) Lydia Steinbach | 7–5, 2–6, 1–6 |
| Runner-up | 9. | 1 October 2001 | ITF Plzeň, Czech Republic | Carpet (i) | (Austria) Sandra Klemenschits | (Czech Republic) Olga Vymetálková (Czech Republic) Gabriela Navrátilová | 2–6, 3–6 |
| Winner | 10. | 15 October 2001 | ITF Giza, Egypt | Clay | (Austria) Sandra Klemenschits | (Ukraine) Olena Antypina (Ukraine) Yuliana Fedak | 6–4, 6–3 |
| Runner-up | 10. | 22 October 2001 | ITF Cairo, Egypt | Clay | (Austria) Sandra Klemenschits | (Russia) Gulnara Fattakhetdinova (Belarus) Elena Yaryshka | 6–7^{(2)}, 3–6 |
| Winner | 11. | 19 November 2001 | ITF Mallorca, Spain | Clay | (Austria) Sandra Klemenschits | (Italy) Silvia Disderi (Italy) Anna Floris | 7–5, 6–4 |
| Winner | 12. | 26 November 2001 | ITF Mallorca, Spain | Clay | (Austria) Sandra Klemenschits | (Italy) Silvia Disderi (Italy) Anna Floris | 6–3, 6–4 |
| Winner | 13. | 15 April 2002 | ITF Hvar, Croatia | Clay | (Austria) Sandra Klemenschits | (Ukraine) Olena Antypina (Slovakia) Lenka Tvarošková | 4–6, 6–3, 6–0 |
| Runner-up | 11. | 22 April 2002 | ITF Cavtat, Croatia | Clay | (Austria) Sandra Klemenschits | (Netherlands) Susanne Trik (Netherlands) Suzanne van Hartingsveldt | 1–6, 3–6 |
| Winner | 14. | 6 May 2002 | ITF Zadar, Croatia | Clay | (Austria) Sandra Klemenschits | (Slovenia) Tina Hergold (Croatia) Sanda Mamić | 6–4, 6–4 |
| Winner | 15. | 17 June 2002 | ITF Velp, Netherlands | Clay | (Austria) Sandra Klemenschits | (Sweden) Helena Ejeson (Netherlands) Kika Hogendoorn | 6–2, 6–1 |
| Runner-up | 12. | 19 August 2002 | ITF Enschede, Netherlands | Clay | (Netherlands) Debby Haak | (Austria) Daniela Kix (Germany) Annette Kolb | 1–6, 5–7 |
| Winner | 16. | 23 September 2002 | ITF Sopron, Hungary | Clay | (Austria) Sandra Klemenschits | (Czech Republic) Milena Nekvapilová (Czech Republic) Hana Šromová | 6–7^{(2)}, 6–2, 6–2 |
| Winner | 17. | 10 March 2003 | ITF Makarska, Croatia | Clay | (Austria) Stefanie Haidner | (Romania) Gabriela Niculescu (Romania) Monica Niculescu | 3–6, 7–6^{(7)}, 6–4 |
| Winner | 18. | 30 March 2003 | ITF Rabat, Morocco | Clay | (South Africa) Chanelle Scheepers | (Sweden) Helena Ejeson (Sweden) Helena Norfeldt | 6–3, 6–2 |
| Runner-up | 13. | 7 April 2003 | ITF Antalya, Turkey | Clay | (Austria) Sandra Klemenschits | (Czech Republic) Zuzana Černá (Czech Republic) Vladimíra Uhlířová | 3–6, 2–6 |
| Winner | 19. | 28 April 2003 | ITF Pula, Croatia | Clay | (Austria) Sandra Klemenschits | (Czech Republic) Jana Macurová (Slovakia) Zuzana Zemenová | 6–2, 6–2 |
| Runner-up | 14. | 26 May 2003 | ITF Zadar, Croatia | Clay | (Austria) Sandra Klemenschits | (Bosnia and Herzegovina) Mervana Jugić-Salkić (Croatia) Darija Jurak | 3–6, 1–6 |
| Runner-up | 15. | 28 July 2003 | ITF Gardone Val Trompia, Italy | Clay | (Austria) Sandra Klemenschits | (France) Kildine Chevalier (Italy) Silvia Disderi | 4–6, 2–6 |
| Runner-up | 16. | 4 August 2003 | Ladies Open Hechingen, Germany | Clay | (Austria) Sandra Klemenschits | (Germany) Angelika Bachmann (Germany) Jasmin Wöhr | 1–6, 4–6 |
| Runner-up | 17. | 15 September 2003 | Sofia Cup, Bulgaria | Clay | (Austria) Sandra Klemenschits | (Bulgaria) Dessislava Topalova (Serbia and Montenegro) Dragana Zarić | 3–6, 5–7 |
| Runner-up | 18. | 12 January 2004 | ITF Dubai, United Arab Emirates | Hard | (Austria) Sandra Klemenschits | (Russia) Gulnara Fattakhetdinova (Czech Republic) Hana Šromová | 3–6, 6–4, 4–6 |
| Runner-up | 19. | 8 March 2004 | ITF Rome, Italy | Clay | (Austria) Sandra Klemenschits | (Italy) Alice Canepa (Italy) Emily Stellato | 3–6, 6–2, 4–6 |
| Runner-up | 20. | 29 March 2004 | ITF Rabat, Morocco | Clay | (Austria) Sandra Klemenschits | (Brazil) Maria Fernanda Alves (Brazil) Carla Tiene | 1–6, 6–7^{(5)} |
| Winner | 20. | 26 April 2004 | ITF Taranto, Italy | Clay | (Austria) Sandra Klemenschits | (Austria) Stefanie Haidner (Austria) Patricia Wartusch | 6–2, 6–1 |
| Runner-up | 21. | 16 August 2004 | ITF Enschede, Netherlands | Clay | (Austria) Sandra Klemenschits | (Netherlands) Susanne Trik (Netherlands) Tessy van de Ven | 6–4, 0–6, 4–6 |
| Runner-up | 22. | 23 August 2004 | ITF Alphen a/d Rijn, Netherlands | Clay | (Austria) Sandra Klemenschits | (Belgium) Leslie Butkiewicz (Belgium) Eveline Vanhyfte | 5–7, 3–6 |
| Runner-up | 23. | 4 October 2004 | ITF Girona, Spain | Clay | (Austria) Sandra Klemenschits | (Argentina) Erica Krauth (Germany) Jasmin Wöhr | 6–2, 4–6, 3–6 |
| Winner | 21. | 13 December 2004 | ITF Valašské Meziříčí, Czech Republic | Hard (i) | (Austria) Sandra Klemenschits | (Czech Republic) Lucie Hradecká (Czech Republic) Eva Hrdinová | w/o |
| Winner | 22. | 12 January 2005 | ITF Dubai, United Arab Emirates | Hard | (Austria) Sandra Klemenschits | (Russia) Kristina Grigorian (Ukraine) Oxana Lyubtsova | 7–5, 6–1 |
| Runner-up | 24. | 24 January 2005 | ITF Belfort, France | Hard (i) | (Austria) Sandra Klemenschits | (Netherlands) Michelle Gerards (Netherlands) Anousjka van Exel | 1–6, 2–4 ret. |
| Runner-up | 25. | 15 March 2005 | ITF Morelia, Mexico | Hard | (Austria) Sandra Klemenschits | (Argentina) Jorgelina Cravero (Argentina) Veronica Spiegel | 4–6, 2–6 |
| Runner-up | 26. | 29 March 2005 | ITF Poza Rica, Mexico | Hard | (Austria) Sandra Klemenschits | (Netherlands) Seda Noorlander (Italy) Mara Santangelo | 2–6, 6–4, 3–6 |
| Runner-up | 27. | 30 May 2005 | ITF Raanana, Israel | Hard | (Austria) Sandra Klemenschits | (Israel) Tzipora Obziler (Israel) Shahar Pe'er | 6–7^{(2)}, 6–1, 2–6 |
| Runner-up | 28. | 6 June 2005 | Zagreb Ladies Open, Croatia | Clay | (Austria) Sandra Klemenschits | (Czech Republic) Lucie Hradecká (Czech Republic) Vladimíra Uhlířová | 2–6, 2–6 |
| Runner-up | 29. | 24 April 2006 | Open de Cagnes-sur-Mer, France | Clay | (Austria) Sandra Klemenschits | (France) Sophie Lefèvre (France) Aurélie Védy | 6–2, 4–6, 6–7^{(1)} |
| Runner-up | 30. | 21 June 2006 | ITF Fontanafredda, Italy | Clay | (Austria) Sandra Klemenschits | (Czech Republic) Andrea Hlaváčková (Czech Republic) Renata Voráčová | 4–6, 4–6 |
| Runner-up | 31. | 26 June 2006 | ITF Anif, Austria | Clay | (Austria) Sandra Klemenschits | (Hungary) Katalin Marosi (Brazil) Marina Tavares | 6–3, 6–7^{(2)}, 3–6 |
| Runner-up | 32. | 18 July 2006 | ITF Darmstadt, Germany | Clay | (Austria) Sandra Klemenschits | (Romania) Monica Niculescu (Israel) Yevgenia Savransky | 6–1, 0–6, 1–6 |
| Runner-up | 33. | 22 August 2006 | ITF Bielefeld, Germany | Clay | (Austria) Sandra Klemenschits | (Germany) Carmen Klaschka (Germany) Justine Ozga | 7–6^{(1)}, 3–6, 3–6 |
| Winner | 23. | 31 October 2006 | ITF Erding, Germany | Carpet (i) | (Austria) Sandra Klemenschits | (Germany) Carmen Klaschka (Germany) Annette Kolb | 1–6, 6–3, 6–2 |
