= Katarina Mišić =

Serbian tennis player

Katarina Mišić Катарина Мишић
- Country (sports): Yugoslavia (1992–2003) / Serbia and Montenegro (2003–2005)
- Born: 5 February 1976 (age 49); Belgrade, SR Serbia, SFR Yugoslavia
- Turned pro: 1992
- Retired: 2005
- Plays: Right-handed (two-handed backhand)
- Prize money: $91,978

Singles
- Career record: 189–205
- Career titles: 4 ITF
- Highest ranking: No. 220 (4 August 2003)

Grand Slam singles results
- US Open: Q1 (2003)

Doubles
- Career record: 135–145
- Career titles: 11 ITF
- Highest ranking: No. 151 (19 May 2003)

Grand Slam doubles results
- Wimbledon: Q1 (2003)

Team competitions
- Fed Cup: 15–8

Katarina Mišić (Serbian Cyrillic: Катарина Мишић; born 5 February 1976) is a Serbian tennis coach and former professional tennis player.

In her career, she won four singles and eleven doubles titles on the ITF Women's Circuit. On 4 August 2003, she reached her best singles ranking of world No. 220. On 19 May 2003, she peaked at No. 151 in the doubles rankings.

Playing for FR Yugoslavia Fed Cup team from 1995 until 2003, she had a win–loss record of 15–8. Other than her debut year in the Fed Cup in 1995, she played under last name Dašković in 14 ties between 2000 and 2003.

Belgrade-born Mišić retired from pro tour in 2005.

== ITF finals ==
$100,000 tournaments
$75,000 tournaments
$50,000 tournaments
$25,000 tournaments
$10,000 tournaments

=== Singles (4–3) ===
Result	Date	Tier	Tournament	Surface	Opponent	Score
Win	5 July 1999	10,000	Amersfoort, Netherlands	Clay	(New Zealand) Rewa Hudson	7–5, 6–3
Loss	30 August 1999	10,000	Querétaro City, Mexico	Clay	(Brazil) Joana Cortez	6–4, 6–7^{(5)}, 2–6
Loss	20 December 1999	10,000	Lucknow, India	Grass	(Slovenia) Urška Vesenjak	6–4, 2–6, 1–6
Win	29 May 2000	10,000	Skopje, Macedonia	Clay	(Austria) Nadine Schlotterer	6–2, 6–2
Win	7 August 2000	25,000	Carthage, Tunisia	Clay	(Slovenia) Maša Vesenjak	6–1, 6–4
Loss	6 August 2001	25,000	Hechingen, Germany	Clay	(Netherlands) Amanda Hopmans	5–7, 1–6
Win	15 September 2002	25,000	Tbilisi, Georgia	Clay	(Czech Republic) Gabriela Chmelinová	3–6, 6–3, 6–1

=== Doubles (11–11) ===
Result	Date	Tier	Tournament	Surface	Partner	Opponents	Score
Win	14 December 1992	10,000	Cairo, Egypt	Clay	(Switzerland) Monica Augsburger	(Egypt) Alia Elshishini (Egypt) Marwa Elwany	6–1, 6–1
Loss	27 May 1996	10,000	Skopje, Macedonia	Clay	(North Macedonia) Marina Lazarovska	(Bulgaria) Galina Dimitrova (Bulgaria) Antoaneta Pandjerova	4–6, 0–6
Loss	28 April 1997	10,000	Sofia, Bulgaria	Clay	(France) Marina Caiazzo	(North Macedonia) Marina Lazarovska (Bulgaria) Teodora Nedeva	4–6, 2–6
Loss	27 December 1999	10,000	Chandigarh, India	Grass	(India) Manisha Malhotra	(Slovenia) Maša Vesenjak (Slovenia) Urška Vesenjak	3–6, 7–6^{(5)}, 0–6
Loss	31 January 2000	10,000	Istanbul, Turkey	Grass	(Israel) Nataly Cahana	(Belarus) Elena Yaryshka (Russia) Irina Kornienko	3–6, 6–3, 4–6
Win	4 June 2000	10,000	Skopje, Macedonia	Clay	(North Macedonia) Marina Lazarovska	(Federal Republic of Yugoslavia) Ljiljana Nanušević (Bulgaria) Biljana Pawlowa-Dimitrova	7–6^{(6)}, 6–3
Loss	10 September 2000	25,000	Bucharest, Romania	Clay	(Germany) Marketa Kochta	(Bulgaria) Antoaneta Pandjerova (Bulgaria) Desislava Topalova	4–6, 2–6
Loss	21 August 2001	25,000	Maribor, Slovenia	Clay	(Spain) Mariam Ramon Climent	(Czech Republic) Olga Vymetálková (Czech Republic) Gabriela Chmelinová	2–6, 2–6
Win	13 May 2002	25,000	Bromma, Sweden	Clay	(Federal Republic of Yugoslavia) Dragana Zarić	(Brazil) Joana Cortez (United States) Tiffany Dabek	6–4, 6–4
Win	21 May 2002	25,000	Turin, Italy	Clay	(Federal Republic of Yugoslavia) Dragana Zarić	(Argentina) Erica Krauth (Hungary) Katalin Marosi	7–6^{(5)}, 6–3
Loss	27 May 2002	25,000	Mostar, Bosnia and Herzegovina	Clay	(Hungary) Katalin Marosi	(Slovenia) Tina Hergold (Federal Republic of Yugoslavia) Sandra Načuk	3–6, 3–6
Win	21 July 2002	25,000	Les Contamines, France	Hard	(Russia) Maria Kondratieva	(France) Stéphanie Cohen-Aloro (France) Anne-Laure Heitz	6–1, 7–6^{(4)}
Win	12 August 2002	25,000	Aosta, Italy	Clay	(Federal Republic of Yugoslavia) Dragana Zarić	(Brazil) Maria Fernanda Alves (Romania) Andreea Ehritt-Vanc	7–5, 7–6^{(6)}
Loss	27 October 2002	25,000	Saint-Raphaël, France	Hard (i)	(Federal Republic of Yugoslavia) Dragana Zarić	(Bulgaria) Antoaneta Pandjerova (Bulgaria) Desislava Topalova	6–4, 3–6, 1–6
Win	1 December 2002	25,000	Mumbai, India	Hard	(Israel) Tzipora Obziler	(New Zealand) Shelley Stephens (Germany) Scarlett Werner	6–3, 4–6, 7–5
Loss	18 February 2003	25,000	Redbridge, United Kingdom	Hard (i)	(Serbia and Montenegro) Dragana Zarić	(Belarus) Olga Barabanschikova (Belarus) Nadejda Ostrovskaya	4–6, 6–1, 5–7
Loss	5 July 2004	25,000	Darmstadt, Germany	Clay	(Serbia and Montenegro) Dragana Zarić	(Germany) Vanessa Henke (Germany) Martina Müller	1–6, 5–7
Win	10 October 2004	10,000	Podgorica, Serbia and Montenegro	Clay	(Serbia and Montenegro) Dragana Zarić	(Czech Republic) Janette Bejlková (Bulgaria) Biljana Pawlowa-Dimitrova	6–1, 6–2
Win	16 October 2004	10,000	Herceg Novi, Serbia and Montenegro	Clay	(Serbia and Montenegro) Dragana Zarić	(Slovenia) Alja Zec Peškirič (Slovenia) Maša Zec Peškirič	6–1, 6–2
Win	29 November 2004	10,000	Cairo, Egypt	Clay	(Serbia and Montenegro) Dragana Zarić	(Russia) Galina Fokina (Russia) Raissa Gourevitch	7–5, 6–4
Win	6 December 2004	10,000	Cairo, Egypt	Clay	(Serbia and Montenegro) Dragana Zarić	(Russia) Galina Fokina (Russia) Raissa Gourevitch	6–2, 6–2
Loss	30 January 2005	25,000	Sunderland, United Kingdom	Hard (i)	(Serbia and Montenegro) Dragana Zarić	(Sweden) Sofia Arvidsson (Germany) Martina Müller	2–6, 3–6
