= Olena Antypina =

Ukrainian tennis player

- Country (sports): Ukraine
- Residence: Zaporizhia, Ukraine
- Born: 19 March 1979 (age 47) Zaporizhia
- Turned pro: May 2000
- Retired: August 2006
- Plays: Right (two-handed backhand)
- Prize money: $72,197

Singles
- Career record: 130–109
- Career titles: 1 ITF
- Highest ranking: No. 180 (28 November 2005)

Grand Slam singles results
- Australian Open: Q1 (2006)
- French Open: Q1 (2006)
- Wimbledon: Q1 (2006)
- US Open: Q2 (2005)

Doubles
- Career record: 143–81
- Career titles: 13 ITF
- Highest ranking: No. 128 (10 October 2005)

Olena Volodymyrivna Antypina (also known as Olena Schmelzer) (Ukrainian: Олена Володимирівна Антипіна; born 19 March 1979) is a former professional tennis player from Ukraine.

Her highest singles ranking is world No. 180, which she achieved in November 2005. She played on the ITF Women's Circuit from 2000 through to 2006.

In her professional career, Antypina won fourteen titles, of which one was in singles and thirteen in doubles. She tried qualifying for Grand Slam tournaments on multiple occasions, but was unsuccessful with each one.

She qualified for one WTA Tour event in Tashkent in 2005 but lost in round one of the Tier IV tournament to compatriot Kateryna Bondarenko.

Her biggest ITF title came at Washington D.C. in 2005 when she won the doubles draw of the $75k tournament, partnering Tatiana Poutchek of Belarus.

== ITF Circuit finals ==
=== Singles: 5 (1 title, 4 runner-ups) ===
Legend
$75,000 tournaments
$50,000 tournaments
$25,000 tournaments
$10,000 tournaments

Result	No.	Date	Tournament	Surface	Opponent	Score
Loss	1.	10 June 2001	ITF Ankara, Turkey	Clay	(Romania) Monica Mastan	5–7, 3–6
Loss	2.	26 August 2002	ITF Bucharest, Romania	Clay	(Romania) Delia Sescioreanu	1–6, 4–6
Loss	3.	21 December 2003	ITF Cairo, Egypt	Clay	(Slovakia) Kristína Czafiková	2–6, 7–6^{(3)}, 0–6
Win	4.	9 May 2005	ITF Monzón, Spain	Hard	(Germany) Angelique Kerber	6–3, 6–3
Loss	5.	13 November 2005	Toronto Challenger, Canada	Hard (i)	(Canada) Aleksandra Wozniak	4–6, 3–6

=== Doubles: 23 (13 titles, 10 runner-ups) ===
Result	No.	Date	Tournament	Surface	Partner	Opponents	Score
Loss	1.	28 May 2000	ITF Warsaw, Poland	Clay	(Russia) Daria Panova	(Czech Republic) Andrea Plačková (Czech Republic) Petra Plačková	w/o
Win	2.	19 August 2001	ITF Bucharest, Romania	Clay	(Ukraine) Yuliana Fedak	(Ukraine) Yevgenia Savranska (Kazakhstan) Galina Voskoboeva	4–6, 6–1, 6–4
Loss	3.	10 September 2001	ITF Sofia, Bulgaria	Clay	(Ukraine) Yuliana Fedak	(Czech Republic) Olga Vymetálková (Czech Republic) Magdalena Zděnovcová	3–6, 3–6
Loss	4.	15 October 2001	ITF Giza, Egypt	Clay	(Ukraine) Yuliana Fedak	(Austria) Daniela Klemenschits (Austria) Sandra Klemenschits	4–6, 3–6
Loss	5.	15 April 2002	ITF Hvar, Croatia	Clay	(Slovakia) Lenka Tvarošková	(Austria) Daniela Klemenschits (Austria) Sandra Klemenschits	6–4, 3–6, 0–6
Loss	6.	11 August 2002	ITF Gdynia, Poland	Clay	(Belarus) Darya Kustova	(Slovakia) Lenka Tvarošková (Slovakia) Zuzana Zemenová	3–6, 6–7^{(3)}
Win	7.	6 October 2002	ITF Ain Sukhna, Egypt	Clay	(Czech Republic) Hana Šromová	(Slovenia) Kim Kambic (France) Aurélie Védy	6–2, 7–5
Win	8.	20 October 2002	ITF Mansoura, Egypt	Clay	(Czech Republic) Hana Šromová	(Russia) Goulnara Fattakhetdinova (Kazakhstan) Galina Voskoboeva	6–2, 6–2
Win	9.	12 May 2003	ITF Monzón, Spain	Hard	(Russia) Raissa Gourevitch	(Romania) Liana Ungur (France) Kildine Chevalier	3–6, 7–5, 6–1
Win	10.	7 July 2003	Bella Cup, Poland	Clay	(Czech Republic) Zuzana Hejdová	(Australia) Mireille Dittmann (Sweden) Helena Ejeson	6–3, 6–3
Win	11.	29 November 2003	ITF Haifa, Israel	Hard	(Russia) Nina Bratchikova	(Ukraine) Veronika Kapshay (Hungary) Barbara Pócza	7–5, 6–4
Win	12.	6 December 2003	ITF Tel Aviv, Israel	Hard	(Russia) Nina Bratchikova	(Russia) Oksana Karyshkova (Belarus) Elena Yaryshka	6–1, 5–7, 6–3
Loss	13.	30 March 2004	ITF Cairo, Egypt	Clay	(Armenia) Liudmila Nikoyan	(Russia) Raissa Gourevitch (Russia) Ekaterina Kozhokina	2–6, 0–6
Loss	14.	18 September 2004	ITF Ho Chi Minh City, Vietnam	Hard	(Russia) Gulnara Fattakhetdinova	(Japan) Rika Fujiwara (Japan) Aiko Nakamura	3–6, 3–6
Loss	15.	30 August 2004	ITF Balashikha, Russia	Hard (i)	(Russia) Alla Kudryavtseva	(Russia) Maria Goloviznina (Russia) Elena Vesnina	5–7, 4–6
Win	16.	26 October 2004	ITF Istanbul, Turkey	Hard (i)	(Czech Republic) Hana Šromová	(Turkey) İpek Şenoğlu (Germany) Kathrin Wörle-Scheller	6–7^{(5)}, 6–3, 7–5
Win	17.	9 May 2005	ITF Monzón, Spain	Hard	(South Africa) Surina De Beer	(Czech Republic) Petra Cetkovská (Spain) Gabriela Velasco Andreu	7–5, 7–5
Loss	18.	12 June 2005	ITF Gorizia, Italy	Clay	(Russia) Nina Bratchikova	(Italy) Giulia Casoni (Italy) Valentina Sulpizio	2–6, 0–6
Win	19.	27 June 2005	ITF Båstad, Sweden	Clay	(Belarus) Nadejda Ostrovskaya	(Argentina) Erica Krauth (Sweden) Hanna Nooni	7–5, 3–6, 6–3
Win	20.	7 August 2005	ITF Washington, United States	Clay	(Belarus) Tatiana Poutchek	(United States) Jennifer Hopkins (China) Yan Zi	6–4, 6–4
Loss	21.	19 September 2005	ITF Jounieh Open, Lebanon	Hard	(Czech Republic) Hana Šromová	(Ukraine) Mariya Koryttseva (Belarus) Anastasiya Yakimova	5–7, 2–6
Win	22.	13 November 2005	Toronto Challenger, Canada	Hard (i)	(Germany) Martina Müller	(United States) Lauren Barnikow (United States) Kristen Schlukebir	6–3, 6–1
Win	23.	22 July 2006	ITF Dnipropetrovsk, Ukraine	Clay	(Russia) Nina Bratchikova	(Russia) Evgeniya Rodina (Ukraine) Kristina Antoniychuk	6–1, 5–7, 7–5
