= Elena Yaryshka =

Belarusian tennis player

Elena Yaryshka Алена Yaryshka
- Country (sports): Belarus
- Born: 7 December 1981 (age 44) Minsk, Soviet Union
- Turned pro: 1995
- Retired: 2006
- Prize money: $28,384

Singles
- Career record: 99–64
- Career titles: 3 ITF
- Highest ranking: 419 (21 April 2003)

Doubles
- Career record: 68–42
- Career titles: 8 ITF
- Highest ranking: 316 (18 June 2001)

Elena Yaryshka (Belarusian: Алена Yaryshka; born 7 December 1981) is a retired Belarusian tennis player.

In her career, Yaryshka won three singles titles and eight doubles titles on the ITF Circuit. On 21 April 2003, she reached her best singles ranking of world No. 419. On 18 June 2001, she peaked at No. 316 in the doubles rankings.

Playing for Belarus in Fed Cup competition, she has a win–loss record of 0–1.

Yaryshka retired from professional tennis in 2006.

== ITF Circuit finals ==
$25,000 tournaments
$10,000 tournaments

=== Singles: 6 (3–3) ===
Result	Date	Tier	Tournament	Surface	Opponent	Score
Loss	28 August 2000	10,000	ITF İstanbul, Turkey	Hard	(Germany) Susi Bensch	4–6, 5–7
Loss	25 September 2000	10,000	ITF Antalya, Turkey	Clay	(Hungary) Adrienn Hegedűs	6–7^{(4)}, 5–7
Win	30 October 2000	10,000	ITF Minsk, Belarus	Carpet (i)	(Russia) Anna Bastrikova	4–1, 4–1
Loss	8 April 2001	10,000	ITF Athens, Greece	Clay	(Serbia) Ana Timotić	5–7, 3–6
Win	7 May 2001	10,000	ITF Mersin, Turkey	Clay	(Belarus) Evgenia Subbotina	6–1, 6–1
Win	8 July 2002	10,000	ITF İstanbul, Turkey	Clay	(Belarus) Tatsiana Uvarova	3–6, 6–3, 7–5

=== Doubles: 13 (8–5) ===
Result	Date	Tier	Tournament	Surface	Partner	Opponents	Score
Win	31 January 2000	10,000	ITF İstanbul, Turkey	Hard	(Russia) Irina Kornienko	(Israel) Nataly Cahana (Serbia and Montenegro) Katarina Mišić	6–3, 3–6, 6–4
Loss	5 June 2000	10,000	ITF Antalya, Turkey	Clay	(Poland) Agata Kurowska	(Austria) Susanne Filipp (Sweden) Maria Wolfbrandt	2–6, 4–6
Loss	26 June 2000	10,000	ITF İstanbul, Turkey	Hard	(Russia) Irina Kornienko	(Ukraine) Valeria Bondarenko (Russia) Goulnara Fattakhetdinova	2–6, 6–4, 3–6
Loss	7 August 2000	10,000	ITF İstanbul, Turkey	Hard	(Turkey) Seden Özlü	(Russia) Goulnara Fattakhetdinova (Russia) Elena Voropaeva	6–1, 3–6, 4–6
Win	19 January 2001	10,000	ITF İstanbul, Turkey	Hard	(Turkey) Duygu Akşit Oal	(Russia) Maria Kondratieva (Russia) Svetlana Mossiakova	6–3, 6–0
Win	7 May 2001	10,000	ITF Mersin, Turkey	Clay	(Turkey) Duygu Akşit Oal	(Portugal) Angela Cardoso (Portugal) Ana Catarina Nogueira	6–1, 6–4
Winner	10 June 2001	10,000	ITF Ankara, Turkey	Clay	(Turkey) İpek Şenoğlu	(Slovenia) Maša Vesenjak (Slovenia) Urška Vesenjak	3–6, 6–3, 6–4
Win	21 October 2001	10,000	ITF Cairo, Egypt	Clay	(Russia) Goulnara Fattakhetdinova	(Austria) Daniela Klemenschits (Austria) Sandra Klemenschits	7–6^{(2)}, 6–3
Win	28 October 2001	10,000	ITF Mansoura, Egypt	Clay	(Russia) Goulnara Fattakhetdinova	(Slovenia) Maša Vesenjak (Slovenia) Urška Vesenjak	6–1, 6–2
Win	10 June 2002	10,000	ITF Ankara, Turkey	Clay	(India) Sai Jayalakshmy Jayaram	(Germany) Jacqueline Froehlich (Romania) Ruxandra Marin	6–2, 6–2
Loss	24 March 2003	25,000	ITF St. Petersburg, Russia	Carpet (i)	(Russia) Irina Bulykina	(Russia) Goulnara Fattakhetdinova (Russia) Galina Fokina	0–6, 3–6
Win	31 March 2003	10,000	ITF İstanbul, Turkey	Hard (i)	(Sweden) Aleksandra Srndovic	(Sweden) Anna Erikson (Sweden) Jenny Lindstrom	4–6, 6–4, 6–2
Loss	30 November 2003	10,000	ITF Tel Aviv, Israel	Hard	(Russia) Oksana Karyshkova	(Ukraine) Olena Antypina (Russia) Nina Bratchikova	1–6, 7–5, 3–6

== Fed Cup participation ==
=== Doubles ===
Edition	Stage	Date	Location	Against	Surface	Partner	Opponents	W/L	Score
2001 Fed Cup; Europe/Africa Zone Group I	R/R	25 May 2001	Murcia, Spain	Sweden	Clay	(Belarus) Olga Barabanschikova	(Sweden) Åsa Carlsson (Sweden) Maria Wolfbrandt	L	5–7, 2–6
