= Irina Kornienko =

Russian tennis player

- Country (sports): Russia
- Born: 16 January 1978 (age 47)
- Plays: Right-handed
- Prize money: $30,464

Singles
- Career record: 80–118
- Career titles: 0
- Highest ranking: No. 452 (26 October 1998)

Doubles
- Career record: 86–75
- Career titles: 6 ITF
- Highest ranking: No. 263 (11 October 1999)

Irina Kornienko (born 16 January 1978) is a Russian former professional tennis player.

Kornienko, a right-handed player, reached her career-high singles ranking of 452 in 1998.

All of her WTA Tour main-draw appearances came in doubles, which included making the quarterfinals of the 1999 Tashkent Open. She won six ITF doubles titles and had a best doubles ranking of 263 in the world.

In 2005, she married tennis player Igor Kunitsyn.

== ITF finals ==
=== Doubles: 12 (6–6) ===
Outcome	No.	Date	Tournament	Surface	Partner	Opponents	Score
Runner-up	1.	31 August 1997	Kyiv, Ukraine	Clay	(Latvia) Elena Krutko	(Belarus) Vera Zhukovets (Belarus) Nadejda Ostrovskaya	1–6, 3–6
Winner	1.	21 June 1998	Tallinn, Estonia	Hard	(Czech Republic) Helena Fremuthova	(Estonia) Maret Ani (Estonia) Helen Laupa	6–3, 6–2
Runner-up	2.	5 July 1998	Lohja, Finland	Hard	(Czech Republic) Helena Fremuthova	(United Kingdom) Jasmine Choudhury (Switzerland) Aliénor Tricerri	3–6, 2–6
Runner-up	3.	11 April 1999	Cerignola, Italy	Clay	(Russia) Lina Krasnoroutskaya	(United Kingdom) Jasmine Choudhury (United Kingdom) Lizzie Jelfs	5–7, 5–7
Winner	2.	4 July 1999	Tallinn, Estonia	Clay	(Russia) Ekaterina Sysoeva	(Finland) Minna Rautajoki (Sweden) Maria Wolfbrandt	6–1, 6–1
Winner	3.	6 February 2000	Istanbul 1, Turkey	Hard	(Belarus) Elena Yaryshka	(Israel) Nataly Cahana (Serbia and Montenegro) Katarina Mišić	6–3, 3–6, 6–4
Runner-up	4.	28 May 2000	Tel Aviv, Israel	Hard	(Russia) Elena Voropaeva	(Romania) Simona Arghire (Greece) Maria Pavlidou	1–6, 2–6
Runner-up	5.	2 July 2000	Istanbul 2, Turkey	Hard	(Belarus) Elena Yaryshka	(Ukraine) Valeria Bondarenko (Russia) Goulnara Fattakhetdinova	2–6, 6–4, 3–6
Winner	4.	20 May 2001	Tel Aviv 1, Israel	Hard	(Greece) Maria Pavlidou	(Moldova) Evghenia Ablovatchi (Israel) Yevgenia Savranska	6–2, 6–4
Winner	5.	27 May 2001	Tel Aviv 2, Israel	Hard	(Greece) Maria Pavlidou	(Australia) Emily Hewson (South Africa) Natasha van der Merwe	w/o
Runner-up	6.	1 July 2001	Athens, Greece	Clay	(Greece) Irini Alevizopoulou	(Federal Republic of Yugoslavia) Dina Milosević (Croatia) Lana Popadić	6–7^{(3)}, 3–6
Winner	6.	5 August 2001	Casablanca, Morocco	Clay	(Latvia) Līga Dekmeijere	(Japan) Chiaki Nakajima (Japan) Ayako Suzuki	6–1, 6–4
