= İpek Şenoğlu =

Turkish tennis player

- Country (sports): Turkey
- Residence: Istanbul
- Born: 8 June 1979 (age 46) Eskişehir
- Height: 1.80 m (5 ft 11 in)
- Turned pro: 1996
- Retired: 2012
- Plays: Right (two-handed backhand)
- Prize money: $261,244

Singles
- Career record: 143–140
- Career titles: 2 ITF
- Highest ranking: 293 (5 July 2004)

Doubles
- Career record: 254–201
- Career titles: 21 ITF
- Highest ranking: 53 (19 October 2009)

Grand Slam doubles results
- Australian Open: 2R (2005)
- French Open: 1R (2009, 2010)
- Wimbledon: 3R (2009)
- US Open: 3R (2004)

Team competitions
- Fed Cup: 22–18

İpek Şenoğlu (born 8 June 1979), nicknamed İpeko, is a Turkish former professional tennis player.

She first made history in June 2004, when she was accepted into the women's doubles qualifying for Wimbledon. Though Şenoğlu did not advance into the main draw of Wimbledon, she became the first Turk ever to play in a qualifying tournament for a Grand Slam event.

On 15 May 2005, Venus Williams played a show game with Şenoğlu on the Bosporus Bridge in Istanbul, the first tennis match ever to be played across two continents. The event was organized as a promotion ahead of the 2005 İstanbul Cup and lasted five minutes only on the north side of the bridge. After the exhibition, they both threw a tennis ball into the Bosporus.

She and partner Yaroslava Shvedova reached the semifinals of the 2009 Italian Open, a WTA Premier event. Following this event, İpek's WTA doubles rank rose to No. 76. Her peak doubles ranking has been No. 53.

== WTA Tour finals ==
=== Doubles: 1 (runner-up) ===
Result	Date	Tournament	Tier	Surface	Partner	Opponents	Score
Loss	19 April 2008	Portugal Open	Tier IV	Clay	(Bosnia and Herzegovina) Mervana Jugić-Salkić	(Russia) Maria Kirilenko (Italy) Flavia Pennetta	4–6, 4–6

== ITF finals ==
Legend
$100,000 tournaments
$75,000 tournaments
$50,000 tournaments
$25,000 tournaments
$10,000 tournaments

=== Singles: 10 (2–8) ===
Result	No.	Date	Tournament	Surface	Opponent	Score
Loss	1.	9 September 2001	ITF Chennai, India	Clay	(India) Radhika Tulpule	1–6, 6–7^{(2)}
Loss	2.	7 December 2002	Pune, India	Hard	(Ukraine) Kateryna Bondarenko	1–6, 1–6
Loss	3.	25 May 2003	Almería, Spain	Hard	(France) Kildine Chevalier	6–4, 4–6, 1–6
Loss	4.	3 August 2003	Istanbul, Turkey	Hard	(Bulgaria) Tsvetana Pironkova	6–7^{(2)}, 0–6
Win	1.	17 August 2003	London, England	Hard	(United Kingdom) Hannah Collin	6–4, 6–4
Win	2.	24 August 2003	Westende, Belgium	Clay	(Belgium) Eveline Vanhyfte	6–3, 6–2
Loss	5.	18 April 2004	Morelia, Mexico	Hard	(Argentina) Natalia Garbellotto	4–6, 6–4, 4–6
Loss	6.	31 October 2004	ITF Istanbul, Turkey	Hard (i)	(Hungary) Virág Németh	5–7, 4–6
Loss	7.	13 February 2006	ITF Algarve, Portugal	Hard	(Spain) Carla Suárez Navarro	2–6, 3–6
Loss	8.	18 June 2006	ITF Lleida, Spain	Hard	(India) Sandhya Nagaraj	4–6, 2–6

=== Doubles: 44 (21–23) ===
Result	No.	Date	Tournament	Surface	Partner	Opponents	Score
Win	1.	25 September 1995	ITF Antalya, Turkey	Hard	(Czech Republic) Pavlina Bartunková	(United States) Susan Bowman (Finland) Kirsi Lampinen	7–5, 6–4
Win	2.	18 August 1996	Istanbul, Turkey	Hard	(Bulgaria) Dessislava Topalova	(Malaysia) Khoo Chin-bee (Romania) Alice Pirsu	6–1, 6–4
Loss	1.	18 June 2000	Ankara, Turkey	Clay	(Bulgaria) Kalina Diankova	(Bosnia and Herzegovina) Mervana Jugić-Salkić (North Macedonia) Marina Lazarovska	2–6, 6–0, 4–6
Win	3.	10 June 2001	Ankara, Turkey	Clay	(Belarus) Elena Yaryshka	(Slovenia) Maša Vesenjak (Slovenia) Urška Vesenjak	3–6, 6–3, 6–4
Loss	2.	30 September 2001	Kastoria, Greece	Clay	(Bulgaria) Biljana Pawlowa-Dimitrova	(Greece) Maria Pavlidou (Greece) Asimina Kaplani	3–6, 5–7
Loss	3.	24 February 2002	Istanbul, Turkey	Hard (i)	(Hungary) Eszter Molnár	(Russia) Goulnara Fattakhetdinova (Italy) Giorgia Mortello	5–7, 1–6
Loss	4.	5 May 2002	Bournemouth, England	Clay	(Greece) Christina Zachariadou	(United Kingdom) Anna Hawkins (United Kingdom) Jane O'Donoghue	0–6, 0–6
Loss	5.	4 August 2002	Pontevedra, Spain	Hard	(Italy) Alberta Brianti	(Portugal) Neuza Silva (Portugal) Frederica Piedade	2–6, 6–4, 2–6
Loss	6.	27 April 2003	Hvar, Croatia	Clay	(Czech Republic) Vladimíra Uhlířová	(Czech Republic) Jana Macurová (Czech Republic) Gabriela Chmelinová	4–6, 6–3, 1–6
Win	4.	11 May 2003	Tortosa, Spain	Clay	(Portugal) Frederica Piedade	(Romania) Liana Ungur (Spain) María Pilar Sánchez Alayeto	6–4, 7–6^{(3)}
Win	5.	25 May 2003	Almeria, Spain	Hard	(Portugal) Neuza Silva	(Colombia) Romy Farah (Spain) Astrid Waernes	7–5, 5–7, 6–3
Win	6.	29 June 2003	Orestiada, Greece	Hard	(Serbia and Montenegro) Daniela Berček	(Greece) Eleftheria Makromaridou (Greece) Anna Koumantou	7–6^{(4)}, 6–2
Loss	7.	10 August 2003	Wrexham, Wales	Hard	(Turkey) Pemra Özgen	(Republic of Ireland) Yvonne Doyle (Republic of Ireland) Karen Nugent	3–6, 3–6
Loss	8.	24 August 2003	Westende, Belgium	Clay	(Belgium) Eveline Vanhyfte	(Belgium) Leslie Butkiewicz (Netherlands) Kim Kilsdonk	4–6, 2–6
Win	7.	14 September 2003	Madrid, Spain	Clay	(Romania) Liana Ungur	(Australia) Lisa D'Amelio (Belgium) Jennifer Debodt	6–3, 6–3
Win	8.	20 October 2003	Cardiff, Wales	Hard (i)	(Republic of Ireland) Claire Curran	(South Africa) Surina De Beer (New Zealand) Ilke Gers	6–4, 2–6, 6–3
Loss	9.	25 April 2004	Poza Rica, Mexico	Hard	(Argentina) Jorgelina Cravero	(Spain) Lourdes Domínguez Lino (Portugal) Frederica Piedade	5–7, 0–6
Win	9.	23 May 2004	Beijing, China	Hard	(Latvia) Līga Dekmeijere	(China) Rui Du (China) Liu Nannan	4–6, 6–4, 7–6^{(1)}
Win	10.	30 May 2004	Tongliao, China	Hard	(Latvia) Līga Dekmeijere	(Russia) Anna Bastrikova (Russia) Nina Bratchikova	7–5, 7–6^{(5)}
Loss	10.	13 June 2004	Beijing, China	Hard (i)	(Latvia) Līga Dekmeijere	(Chinese Taipei) Chuang Chia-jung (Indonesia) Wynne Prakusya	3–6, 1–6
Win	11.	4 July 2004	Los Gatos, United States	Hard	(Sweden) Sofia Arvidsson	(Japan) Nana Smith (United States) Lilia Osterloh	6–1, 2–6, 6–4
Loss	11.	28 September 2004	Jersey, United Kingdom	Hard (i)	(Netherlands) Anousjka van Exel	(Finland) Emma Laine (Germany) Kathrin Wörle	6–1, 1–6, 1–6
Loss	12.	11 October 2004	Glasgow, Scotland	Hard (i)	(Republic of Ireland) Claire Curran	(New Zealand) Leanne Baker (Italy) Francesca Lubiani	3–6, 7–5, 4–6
Loss	13.	31 October 2004	Istanbul, Turkey	Hard (i)	(Germany) Kathrin Wörle	(Ukraine) Olena Antypina (Czech Republic) Hana Šromová	7–6^{(7)}, 3–6, 5–7
Loss	14.	5 December 2004	Raanana, Israel	Hard	(Morocco) Bahia Mouhtassine	(Israel) Tzipora Obziler (Israel) Shahar Pe'er	3–6, 0–6
Loss	15.	13 February 2006	Algarve, Portugal	Hard	(Romania) Liana Ungur	(France) Émilie Bacquet (Netherlands) Chayenne Ewijk	3–6, 3–6
Loss	16.	5 March 2006	Raanana, Israel	Hard	(Spain) Gabriela Velasco Andreu	(Czech Republic) Iveta Gerlová (Czech Republic) Veronika Raimrova	2–6, 6–2, 3–6
Win	12.	12 March 2006	Haifa, Israel	Hard	(Spain) Gabriela Velasco Andreu	(France) Iryna Brémond (Ukraine) Yana Levchenko	6–0, 6–0
Loss	17.	7 May 2006	Antalya, Turkey	Clay	(Croatia) Matea Mezak	(Israel) Tzipora Obziler (Switzerland) Romina Oprandi	6–4, 4–6, 0–6
Win	13.	14 May 2006	Antalya, Turkey	Clay	(Georgia (country)) Margalita Chakhnashvili	(France) Claire de Gubernatis (Romania) Alexandra Dulgheru	6–4, 6–3
Loss	18.	24 September 2006	Mytilini, Greece	Hard	(Greece) Anna Koumantou	(Slovenia) Maja Kambič (Russia) Alexandra Panova	2–6, 1–6
Win	14.	1 October 2006	Batumi, Georgia	Hard	(Czech Republic) Petra Cetkovská	(Russia) Vasilisa Davydova (Russia) Marina Shamayko	6–4, 3–6, 6–4
Win	15.	29 October 2006	Istanbul, Turkey	Hard (i)	(Bosnia and Herzegovina) Mervana Jugić-Salkić	(Romania) Sorana Cîrstea (United Kingdom) Katie O'Brien	w/o
Loss	19.	19 February 2007	Saint Paul, United States	Hard (i)	(Bosnia and Herzegovina) Mervana Jugić-Salkić	(Sweden) Sofia Arvidsson (Italy) Antonella Serra Zanetti	6–7^{(4)}, 7–5, 6–7^{(7)}
Loss	20.	11 March 2007	Ramat Hasharon, Israel	Hard	(Slovakia) Martina Babáková	(Czech Republic) Iveta Gerlová (Czech Republic) Lucie Kriegsmannová	3–6, 3–6
Win	16.	13 May 2007	Antalya, Turkey	Hard	(Germany) Korina Perkovic	(United Kingdom) Anna Smith (Brazil) Roxane Vaisemberg	7–6^{(1)}, 6–4
Win	17.	20 May 2007	Antalya, Turkey	Clay	(Germany) Korina Perkovic	(United Kingdom) Anna Fitzpatrick (Montenegro) Ana Veselinović	1–6, 6–1, 6–4
Loss	21.	17 July 2007	Boston, United States	Hard	(Latvia) Līga Dekmeijere	(Hungary) Melinda Czink (South Africa) Natalie Grandin	1–6, 3–6
Win	18.	28 October 2007	Istanbul, Turkey	Hard (i)	(Bosnia and Herzegovina) Mervana Jugić-Salkić	(Netherlands) Kim Kilsdonk (Netherlands) Elise Tamaëla	6–1, 6–2
Win	19.	29 June 2008	Périgueux, France	Clay	(Germany) Anna-Lena Grönefeld	(China) Han Xinyun (China) Xu Yifan	6–3, 6–4
Win	20.	6 July 2008	Mont-de-Marsan, France	Clay	(Portugal) Neuza Silva	(Austria) Melanie Klaffner (Portugal) Frederica Piedade	6–4, 6–2
Loss	22.	27 July 2008	ITF Pétange, Luxembourg	Clay	(France) Stéphanie Foretz Gacon	(Italy) Corinna Dentoni (Russia) Anastasia Pivovarova	4–6, 1–6
Win	21.	3 October 2010	ITF Athens, Greece	Hard	(Russia) Vitalia Diatchenko	(Greece) Eleni Daniilidou (Croatia) Petra Martić	w/o
Loss	23.	24 July 2011	ITF Bucharest, Romania	Hard	(Italy) Maria Elena Camerin	(Romania) Irina-Camelia Begu (Romania) Elena Bogdan	7–6^{(7)}, 6–7^{(4)}, 6–4

== See also ==
- Turkish women in sports
