= Maša Vesenjak =

Slovenian tennis player

- Country (sports): Slovenia
- Turned pro: 1999
- Retired: 2003
- Plays: Right-handed (two-handed backhand)
- Prize money: $14,531

Singles
- Career record: 38 - 40
- Highest ranking: 375 (30 July 2001)

Doubles
- Career record: 35 - 32
- Career titles: 2 ITF
- Highest ranking: 295 (18 December 2000)

Maša Vesenjak is a Slovenian female former tennis player.

== ITF finals ==
=== Singles (0–3) ===
Legend $100,000 tournaments $75,000 tournaments $50,000 tournaments $25,000 tournaments $10,000 tournaments	Finals by surface Hard (0–2) Clay (0–1) Grass (0–0) Carpet (0–0)

Result	No.	Date	Tournament	Surface	Opponent	Score
Loss	1.	7 August 2000	Carthage, Tunisia	Clay	(Serbia and Montenegro) Katarina Mišić	1–6, 4–6
Loss	2.	18 September 2000	Antalya, Turkey	Hard	(Slovenia) Urška Vesenjak	3–6, 3–6
Loss	3.	23 October 2000	New Delhi, India	Hard	(Slovenia) Urška Vesenjak	1–4, 5–4(4), 2–4, 4–5(3)

=== Doubles (2–6) ===
Legend $100,000 tournaments $75,000 tournaments $50,000 tournaments $25,000 tournaments $10,000 tournaments	Finals by surface Hard (0–3) Clay (1–2) Grass (1–1) Carpet (0–0)

Result	No.	Date	Tournament	Surface	Partner	Opponents	Score
Loss	1.	20 December 1999	Lucknow, India	Grass	(Slovenia) Urška Vesenjak	(India) Manisha Malhotra (Hong Kong) Tong Ka-po	3–6, 7–5, 1–6
Win	1.	27 December 1999	Chandigarh, India	Grass	(Slovenia) Urška Vesenjak	(Serbia and Montenegro) Katarina Mišić (India) Manisha Malhotra	6–3, 6–7^{(5–7)}, 6–0
Loss	2.	18 September 2000	Antalya, Turkey	Hard	(Slovenia) Urška Vesenjak	(Germany) Bianca Cremer (Hungary) Adrienn Hegedűs	4–6, 4–6
Win	2.	25 September 2000	Antalya, Turkey	Clay	(Slovenia) Urška Vesenjak	(Germany) Bianca Cremer (Hungary) Adrienn Hegedűs	6–1, 2–6, 6–2
Loss	3.	23 October 2000	New Delhi, India	Hard	(Slovenia) Urška Vesenjak	(India) Rushmi Chakravarthi (India) Sai Jayalakshmy Jayaram	4–2, 4–5 (5), 4–1, 4–0
Loss	4.	30 October 2000	New Delhi, India	Hard	(Slovenia) Urška Vesenjak	(India) Rushmi Chakravarthi (India) Sai Jayalakshmy Jayaram	5–3, 4–2, 5–3
Loss	5.	4 June 2001	Ankara, Turkey	Clay	(Slovenia) Urška Vesenjak	(Turkey) İpek Şenoğlu (Belarus) Elena Yaryshka	6–3, 3–6, 4–6
Loss	6.	28 October 2001	Mansoura, Egypt	Clay	(Slovenia) Urška Vesenjak	(Russia) Goulnara Fattakhetdinova (Belarus) Elena Yaryshka	1–6, 2–6

== Achievements ==
She has won two doubles titles on the ITF tour. On 30 July 2001, she reached her best singles ranking of world number 375. On 18 December 2000, she peaked at world number 295 in the doubles rankings. She made her WTA tour debut at the 2001 Morocco Open.
