= Gulnara Fattakhetdinova =

Russian tennis player

- Country (sports): Russia
- Born: October 13, 1982 (age 43) Moscow, Russia
- Turned pro: 1998
- Retired: 2010
- Plays: Right-handed (two-handed backhand)
- Prize money: $84,908

Singles
- Career record: 134–99
- Career titles: 2 ITF
- Highest ranking: No. 246 (12 July 2004)

Grand Slam singles results
- US Open: Q1 (2004)

Doubles
- Career record: 111–86
- Career titles: 11 ITF
- Highest ranking: No. 102 (06 October 2003)

Grand Slam doubles results
- Australian Open: 1R (2004)
- French Open: 1R (2003, 2004)
- Wimbledon: Q1 (2004)

Gulnara Maksutovna Fattakhetdinova (Russian: Гульнара Максутовна Фаттахетдинова, born 13 October 1982) is a Russian former tennis player.

In her career, Fattakhetdinova won two singles and eleven doubles titles on the ITF Women's Circuit. Her career-high ranking is world No. 246, achieved on 12 July 2004, and her highest ranking in doubles was No. 102 on 6 October 2003.

After retiring from the professional tour, she became a beach tennis player.

== Career ==
Fattakhetdinova made her WTA Tour main-draw debut at the 2003 Kremlin Cup, in the doubles event partnering Galina Fokina.

In June 2002, she made her WTA Tour main-draw singles debut at the Tashkent Open, where she run through qualification. In the doubles main draw, Fattakhetdinova partnered Ekaterina Kozhokina and the duo lost in the semifinals. They were beaten 6–4, 6–3 by Tatiana Perebiynis and Tatiana Poutchek.

== ITF Circuit finals ==
=== Singles: 7 (2 titles, 5 runner-ups) ===
Legend $25,000 tournaments $10,000 tournaments	Finals by surface Hard (1–3) Clay (1–2)

Result	No.	Date	Tournament	Surface	Opponent	Score
Win	1.	7 August 2000	ITF İstanbul, Turkey	Hard	(Turkey) Duygu Akşit Oal	6–0, 6–4
Win	2.	2 April 2001	ITF Makarska, Croatia	Clay	(Hungary) Barbara Orlai	6–3, 4–6, 6–2
Loss	1.	30 July 2001	ITF İstanbul, Turkey	Hard	(Federal Republic of Yugoslavia) Ljiljana Nanušević	4–6, 6–1, 2–6
Loss	2.	15 October 2001	ITF Giza, Egypt	Clay	(Austria) Sandra Klemenschits	3–6, 3–6
Loss	3.	21 October 2001	ITF Cairo, Egypt	Clay	(Ukraine) Yuliana Fedak	6–7^{(4–7)}, 4–6
Loss	4.	11 January 2004	ITF Dubai, United Arab Emirates	Hard	(Czech Republic) Hana Šromová	6–4, 5–7, 3–6
Loss	5.	18 September 2004	ITF Ho Chi Minh City, Vietnam	Hard	(Thailand) Suchanun Viratprasert	4–6, 0–6

=== Doubles: 22 (11 titles, 11 runner-ups) ===
Legend $100,000 tournaments $75,000 tournaments $50,000 tournaments $25,000 tournaments $10,000 tournaments	Finals by surface Hard (6–4) Clay (4–7) Carpet (1–0)

Result	No.	Date	Tournament	Surface	Partner	Opponents	Score
Loss	1.	21 June 1999	ITF İstanbul, Turkey	Hard	(Russia) Ekaterina Paniouchkina	(Turkey) Duygu Akşit Oal (Turkey) Gülberk Gültekin	6–3, 2–6, 3–6
Win	1.	2 July 2000	ITF İstanbul, Turkey	Hard	(Ukraine) Valeria Bondarenko	(Russia) Irina Kornienko (Belarus) Elena Yaryshka	6–2, 4–6, 6–3
Win	2.	7 August 2000	ITF İstanbul, Turkey	Hard	(Russia) Elena Voropaeva	(Turkey) Seden Özlu (Belarus) Elena Yaryshka	1–6, 6–3, 6–4
Win	3.	21 October 2001	ITF Cairo, Egypt	Clay	(Belarus) Elena Yaryshka	(Austria) Daniela Klemenschits (Austria) Sandra Klemenschits	7–6^{(7–2)}, 6–3
Win	4.	28 October 2001	ITF Mansoura, Egypt	Clay	(Belarus) Elena Yaryshka	(Slovenia) Maša Vesenjak (Slovenia) Urška Vesenjak	6–1, 6–2
Win	5.	21 January 2002	ITF Courmayeur, Italy	Carpet	(Russia) Maria Kondratieva	(Ukraine) Yuliya Beygelzimer (Netherlands) Jolanda Mens	5–7, 6–3, 6–4
Win	6.	24 February 2002	ITF İstanbul, Turkey	Hard (i)	(Italy) Giorgia Mortello	(Hungary) Eszter Molnár (Turkey) İpek Şenoğlu	7–5, 6–1
Win	7.	30 June 2002	ITF Rabat, Morocco	Clay	(Russia) Maria Kondratieva	(Netherlands) Debby Haak (Netherlands) Jolanda Mens	6–3, 7–5
Win	8.	12 August 2002	ITF Innsbruck, Austria	Clay	(Russia) Maria Kondratieva	(Germany) Magdalena Kučerová (Germany) Lydia Steinbach	6–4, 4–6, 6–3
Loss	2.	8 September 2002	ITF Fano, Italy	Clay	(Belarus) Darya Kustova	(Italy) Flavia Pennetta (Romania) Andreea Ehritt-Vanc	5–7, 3–6
Loss	3.	15 September 2002	ITF Tbilisi, Georgia	Clay	(Russia) Maria Kondratieva	(Czech Republic) Eva Birnerová (Czech Republic) Gabriela Chmelinová	4–6, 0–6
Loss	4.	23 September 2002	Batumi Ladies Open, Georgia	Hard	(Russia) Maria Kondratieva	(Bulgaria) Antoaneta Pandjerova (Bulgaria) Dessislava Topalova	6–2, 1–6, 1–6
Loss	5.	20 October 2002	ITF Mansoura, Egypt	Clay	(Kazakhstan) Galina Voskoboeva	(Ukraine) Olena Antypina (Czech Republic) Hana Šromová	2–6, 2–6
Win	9.	2 February 2003	ITF Doha, Qatar	Hard	(Russia) Galina Fokina	(Germany) Adriana Barna (Germany) Scarlett Werner	6–4, 6–3
Win	10.	24 March 2003	St. Petersburg Trophy, Russia	Hard (i)	(Russia) Galina Fokina	(Russia) Irina Bulykina (Belarus) Elena Yaryshka	6–0, 6–3
Loss	6.	7 April 2003	ITF Dinan, France	Clay (i)	(Russia) Galina Fokina	(Czech Republic) Gabriela Chmelinová (Czech Republic) Michaela Paštiková	6–1, 2–6, 3–6
Loss	7.	1 September 2003	ITF Zhukovsky, Russia	Clay	(Russia) Maria Kondratieva	(Ukraine) Alona Bondarenko (Ukraine) Valeria Bondarenko	7–6^{(8–6)}, 4–6, 3–6
Loss	8.	22 September 2003	Batumi Ladies Open, Georgia	Hard	(Russia) Galina Fokina	(Belarus) Darya Kustova (Ukraine) Elena Tatarkova	6–1, 1–6, 2–6
Win	11.	11 January 2004	ITF Dubai, U.A.E.	Hard	(Czech Republic) Hana Šromová	(Austria) Daniela Klemenschits (Austria) Sandra Klemenschits	6–3, 4–6, 6–4
Loss	9.	6 April 2004	ITF Dinan, France	Clay (i)	(Australia) Anastasia Rodionova	(Croatia) Darija Jurak (Kazakhstan) Galina Voskoboeva	3–6, 2–6
Loss	10.	18 September 2004	ITF Ho Chi Minh City, Vietnam	Hard	(Ukraine) Olena Antypina	(Japan) Rika Fujiwara (Japan) Aiko Nakamura	3–6, 3–6
Loss	11.	26 July 2004	ITF Pétange, Luxembourg	Clay	(Australia) Evie Dominikovic	(Slovakia) Eva Fislová (Slovakia) Stanislava Hrozenská	4–6, 3–6
