= Urška Vesenjak =

Slovenian tennis player

- Country (sports): Slovenia
- Born: 12 September 1982 (age 42); Maribor, SFR Yugoslavia
- Turned pro: 1999
- Retired: 2003
- Plays: Right-handed (two-handed backhand)
- Prize money: $22,668

Singles
- Career record: 67 - 40
- Career titles: 4 ITF
- Highest ranking: 295 (18 December 2000)

Doubles
- Career record: 35 - 34
- Career titles: 2 ITF
- Highest ranking: 295 (18 December 2000)

Urška Vesenjak (born 12 September 1982) is a former Slovenian female tennis player.

Vesenjak has won 4 singles titles and two doubles titles on the ITF tour in her career. On 18 December 2000, she reached her best singles ranking of world number 295. On 18 December 2000, she peaked at world number 295 in the doubles rankings.

Her twin, Maša Vesenjak is also a former female tennis player. Vesenjak made her WTA tour debut at the 2001 Morocco Open.

== ITF finals ==
=== Singles (4–0) ===
Legend $100,000 tournaments $75,000 tournaments $50,000 tournaments $25,000 tournaments $10,000 tournaments	Finals by surface Hard (2–0) Clay (0–0) Grass (2–0) Carpet (0–0)

Result	No.	Date	Tournament	Surface	Opponent	Score
Win	1.	20 December 1999	Lucknow, India	Grass	(Serbia and Montenegro) Katarina Mišić	4–6, 6–2, 6–1
Win	2.	27 December 1999	Chandigarh, India	Grass	(Germany) Antonia Matic	6–2, 6–0
Win	3.	18 September 2000	Antalya, Turkey	Hard	(Slovenia) Maša Vesenjak	6–3, 6–3
Win	4.	23 October 2000	New Delhi, India	Hard	(Slovenia) Maša Vesenjak	1–4, 5–4(4), 2–4, 4–5(3)

=== Doubles (2–6) ===
Legend $100,000 tournaments $75,000 tournaments $50,000 tournaments $25,000 tournaments $10,000 tournaments	Finals by surface Hard (0–3) Clay (1–2) Grass (1–1) Carpet (0–0)

Result	No.	Date	Tournament	Surface	Partner	Opponents	Score
Loss	1.	20 December 1999	Lucknow, India	Grass	(Slovenia) Maša Vesenjak	(India) Manisha Malhotra (Hong Kong) Tong Ka-po	3–6, 7–5, 1–6
Win	1.	27 December 1999	Chandigarh, India	Grass	(Slovenia) Maša Vesenjak	(Serbia and Montenegro) Katarina Mišić (India) Manisha Malhotra	6–3, 6–7^{(5–7)}, 6–0
Loss	2.	18 September 2000	Antalya, Turkey	Hard	(Slovenia) Maša Vesenjak	(Germany) Bianca Cremer (Hungary) Adrienn Hegedűs	4–6, 4–6
Win	2.	25 September 2000	Antalya, Turkey	Clay	(Slovenia) Maša Vesenjak	(Germany) Bianca Cremer (Hungary) Adrienn Hegedűs	6–1, 2–6, 6–2
Loss	3.	23 October 2000	New Delhi, India	Hard	(Slovenia) Maša Vesenjak	(India) Rushmi Chakravarthi (India) Sai Jayalakshmy Jayaram	4–2, 4–5 (5), 4–1, 4–0
Loss	4.	30 October 2000	New Delhi, India	Hard	(Slovenia) Maša Vesenjak	(India) Rushmi Chakravarthi (India) Sai Jayalakshmy Jayaram	5–3, 4–2, 5–3
Loss	5.	4 June 2001	Ankara, Turkey	Clay	(Slovenia) Maša Vesenjak	(Turkey) İpek Şenoğlu (Belarus) Elena Yaryshka	6–3, 3–6, 4–6
Loss	6.	28 October 2001	Mansoura, Egypt	Clay	(Slovenia) Maša Vesenjak	(Russia) Goulnara Fattakhetdinova (Belarus) Elena Yaryshka	1–6, 2–6
