= 2011 Open GDF Suez de Marseille – Doubles =

Doubles
- 2011 Open GDF Suez de Marseille

Final
- Champions: (Romania) Irina-Camelia Begu (Russia) Nina Bratchikova
- Runners-up: (Romania) Laura-Ioana Andrei (Romania) Mădălina Gojnea
- Score: 6–2, 6–2

Events
Singles	Doubles
← 2010 ·	Open GDF Suez de Marseille	· 2012 →

Johanna Larsson and Yvonne Meusburger were the defending champions, but chose not to compete.

Irina-Camelia Begu and Nina Bratchikova defeated Laura-Ioana Andrei and Mădălina Gojnea in the final 6–2, 6–2.

== Seeds ==
1. (Romania) Irina-Camelia Begu / (Russia) Nina Bratchikova (champions)
2. (Austria) Sandra Klemenschits / (Germany) Tatjana Malek (semifinals)
3. (Turkey) İpek Şenoğlu / (Tunisia) Selima Sfar (first round)
4. (France) Julie Coin / (France) Aurélie Védy (quarterfinals)

== Draw ==
=== Key ===
- Q = Qualifier
- WC = Wild card
- LL = Lucky loser
- Alt = Alternate
- SE = Special exempt
- PR = Protected ranking
- ITF = ITF entry
- JE = Junior exempt
- w/o = Walkover
- r = Retired
- d = Defaulted
- SR = Special ranking

First round
1	(Romania) I-C Begu (Russia) N Bratchikova	6	6
WC	(Croatia) D Banoveć (France) N Piquion	2	1
(Spain) L Arruabarrena-Vecino (Spain) L Costas-Moreira	6	6
(Czech Republic) N Fraňková (Germany) S Werner	4	3
4	(France) J Coin (France) A Védy	6	6
(France) P Parmentier (China) S Sun	3	2
(France) A Bergot (Luxembourg) M Minella	3	1
(Russia) A Pivovarova (Belarus) A Yakimova	6	6
(Romania) L-I Andrei (Romania) M Gojnea	w/o
WC	(France) E Cascino (France) L Tholey
(United States) J Cohen (France) V Larrière	3	6	[10]
3	(Turkey) İ Şenoğlu (Tunisia) S Sfar	6	4	[2]
(Spain) E Cabeza Candela (Spain) I Ferrer-Suárez	6	4	[10]
WC	(France) C Dhenin (France) M Peral	2	6	[5]
(France) A Laurendon (France) L Thorpe	4	6	[6]
2	(Austria) S Klemenschits (Germany) T Malek	6	2	[10]

Quarterfinals
1	(Romania) I-C Begu (Russia) N Bratchikova	6	6
(Spain) L Arruabarrena-Vecino (Spain) L Costas-Moreira	4	3
4	(France) J Coin (France) A Védy	6	4	[8]
(Russia) A Pivovarova (Belarus) A Yakimova	4	6	[10]
(Romania) L-I Andrei (Romania) M Gojnea	2	6	[10]
(United States) J Cohen (France) V Larrière	6	3	[3]
(Spain) E Cabeza Candela (Spain) I Ferrer-Suárez	4	2
2	(Austria) S Klemenschits (Germany) T Malek	6	6

Semifinals
1	(Romania) I-C Begu (Russia) N Bratchikova	6	6
(Russia) A Pivovarova (Belarus) A Yakimova	4	1
(Romania) L-I Andrei (Romania) M Gojnea	5	7	[10]
2	(Austria) S Klemenschits (Germany) T Malek	7	6^{5}	[5]

Finals
1	(Romania) I-C Begu (Russia) N Bratchikova	6	6
(Romania) L-I Andrei (Romania) M Gojnea	2	2
