= 2011 Open GDF Suez de Marseille – Singles =

Singles
- 2011 Open GDF Suez de Marseille

Final
- Champions: (France) Pauline Parmentier
- Runners-up: (Romania) Irina-Camelia Begu
- Score: 6–3, 6–2

Events
Singles	Doubles
← 2010 ·	Open GDF Suez de Marseille	· 2012 →

Klára Zakopalová was the defending champion but chose not to participate.
Pauline Parmentier defeated Irina-Camelia Begu in the final 6–3, 6–2.

== Seeds ==
1. (Russia) Anastasia Pivovarova (semifinals)
2. (Belarus) Anastasiya Yakimova (semifinals)
3. (Romania) Irina-Camelia Begu (final)
4. (France) Pauline Parmentier (champion)
5. (Spain) Carla Suárez Navarro (quarterfinals)
6. (Australia) Sophie Ferguson (quarterfinals)
7. (Italy) Corinna Dentoni (quarterfinals)
8. (Luxembourg) Mandy Minella (second round)

== Main draw ==
=== Key ===
- Q = Qualifier
- WC = Wild card
- LL = Lucky loser
- Alt = Alternate
- SE = Special exempt
- PR = Protected ranking
- ITF = ITF entry
- JE = Junior exempt
- w/o = Walkover
- r = Retired
- d = Defaulted
- SR = Special ranking

=== Finals ===
Semifinals
1	(Russia) Anastasia Pivovarova	6	6^{10}	6^{5}
4	(France) Pauline Parmentier	4	7	7
3	(Romania) Irina-Camelia Begu	6	7
2	(Belarus) Anastasiya Yakimova	3	6^{4}

Final
4	(France) Pauline Parmentier	6	6
3	(Romania) Irina-Camelia Begu	3	2

=== Top half ===
First round
1	(Russia) A Pivovarova	6	6
WC	(France) E Lechemia	2	1
Q	(Spain) E Fernández-Brugués	6	6
WC	(France) E Cascino	2	0
Q	(Croatia) D Banoveć	6^{4}	6	6
WC	(France) V Larrière	7	2	4
(France) A Bergot	2	2
8	(Luxembourg) M Minella	6	6
4	(France) P Parmentier	6	6
Q	(Croatia) T Mrdeža	2	1
(Russia) N Bratchikova	6	6^{4}	0
(Romania) M Gojnea	4	7	6
(Spain) E Cabeza Candela	6	2	6^{2}
(Canada) A Wozniak	3	6	7
(China) S Sun	0	r
5	(Spain) C Suárez Navarro	3

Second round
1	(Russia) A Pivovarova	7	6
Q	(Spain) E Fernández-Brugués	5	2
Q	(Croatia) D Banoveć	6	6
8	(Luxembourg) M Minella	4	2
4	(France) P Parmentier	6	4	7
(Romania) M Gojnea	4	6	5
(Canada) A Wozniak	2	3
5	(Spain) C Suárez Navarro	6	6

Quarterfinals
1	(Russia) A Pivovarova	6	2	6
Q	(Croatia) D Banoveć	2	6	1
4	(France) P Parmentier	6	6
5	(Spain) C Suárez Navarro	4	2

Semifinals
1	(Russia) A Pivovarova	6	6^{10}	6^{5}
4	(France) P Parmentier	4	7	7

=== Bottom half ===
First round
6	(Australia) S Ferguson	6	6
(United States) J Cohen	3	1
Q	(Spain) I Ferrer-Suárez	0	3
(Spain) S Soler Espinosa	6	6
(Spain) L Arruabarrena-Vecino	7	6
(France) L Thorpe	5	1
WC	(France) J Coin	2	0
3	(Romania) I-C Begu	6	6
7	(Italy) C Dentoni	6	6
(France) N Piquion	3	3
(France) O Sanchez	3	3
LL	(Romania) L-I Andrei	6	6
(Germany) T Malek	7	6^{2}	3
(France) A Laurendon	5	7	6
(Spain) L Costas-Moreira	4	2
2	(Belarus) A Yakimova	6	6

Second round
6	(Australia) S Ferguson	6	6
(Spain) S Soler Espinosa	3	2
(Spain) L Arruabarrena-Vecino	2	3
3	(Romania) I-C Begu	6	6
7	(Italy) C Dentoni	6	6
LL	(Romania) L-I Andrei	3	2
(France) A Laurendon	6	2	1
2	(Belarus) A Yakimova	3	6	6

Quarterfinals
6	(Australia) S Ferguson	2	1
3	(Romania) I-C Begu	6	6
7	(Italy) C Dentoni	3	6	3
2	(Belarus) A Yakimova	6	4	6

Semifinals
3	(Romania) I-C Begu	6	7
2	(Belarus) A Yakimova	3	6^{4}
