= 2015 Open Féminin de Marseille =

- Date: 1–7 June
- Edition: 18th
- Category: ITF Women's Circuit
- Prize money: $100,000
- Surface: Clay
- Location: Marseille, France

Champions

Singles
- (Romania) Monica Niculescu

Doubles
- (Argentina) Tatiana Búa / (France) Laura Thorpe
← 2014 ·	Open Féminin de Marseille	· 2016 →

The 2015 Open Féminin de Marseille was a professional tennis tournament played on outdoor clay courts. It was the eighteenth edition of the tournament and part of the 2015 ITF Women's Circuit, offering a total of $100,000 in prize money. It took place in Marseille, France, on 1–7 June 2015.

== Singles main draw entrants ==
=== Seeds ===
Country	Player	Rank^{1}	Seed
EST	Kaia Kanepi	50	1
ROU	Monica Niculescu	67	2
GER	Tatjana Maria	73	3
SLO	Polona Hercog	75	4
SRB	Aleksandra Krunić	87	5
CZE	Denisa Allertová	88	6
RUS	Evgeniya Rodina	90	7
FRA	Pauline Parmentier	95	8

- ^{1} Rankings as of 25 May 2015

=== Other entrants ===
The following players received wildcards into the singles main draw:

- (France) Clothilde de Bernardi
- (France) Amandine Hesse
- (France) Chloé Paquet
- (France) Caroline Roméo

The following players received entry from the qualifying draw:

- (Georgia (country)) Oksana Kalashnikova
- (France) Alizé Lim
- (Latvia) Anastasija Sevastova
- (France) Constance Sibille

== Champions ==
=== Singles ===
- (Romania) Monica Niculescu def. (France) Pauline Parmentier, 6–2, 7–5

=== Doubles ===
- (Argentina) Tatiana Búa / (France) Laura Thorpe def. (United States) Nicole Melichar / (Ukraine) Maryna Zanevska, 6–3, 3–6, [10–6]
