= 2017 Open Féminin de Marseille =

- Date: 5–11 June
- Edition: 20th
- Category: ITF Women's Circuit
- Prize money: $100,000
- Surface: Clay
- Location: Marseille, France

Champions

Singles
- (Italy) Jasmine Paolini

Doubles
- (Russia) Natela Dzalamidze / (Russia) Veronika Kudermetova
← 2016 ·	Open Féminin de Marseille	· 2018 →

The 2017 Open Féminin de Marseille was a professional tennis tournament played on outdoor clay courts. It was the twentieth edition of the tournament and part of the 2017 ITF Women's Circuit, offering a total of $100,000 in prize money. It took place in Marseille, France, from 5–11 June 2017.

== Point distribution ==
Event	W	F	SF	QF	Round of 16	Round of 32	Q	Q2	Q3
Singles	140	85	50	25	13	1	6	4	1
Doubles	140	85	50	25	1	—	—	—	—

== Singles main draw entrants ==
=== Seeds ===
Country	Player	Rank^{1}	Seed
GER	Tatjana Maria	102	1
CZE	Denisa Allertová	104	2
MNE	Danka Kovinić	107	3
USA	Taylor Townsend	121	4
SLO	Dalila Jakupović	130	5
ESP	Sílvia Soler Espinosa	147	6
USA	Kayla Day	149	7
HUN	Dalma Gálfi	154	8

- ^{1} Rankings as of 29 May 2017

=== Other entrants ===
The following players received wildcards into the singles main draw:

- (France) Audrey Albié
- (France) Sara Cakarevic
- (France) Caroline Roméo
- (France) Margot Yerolymos

The following players received entry into the singles main draw by a protected ranking:

- (Ukraine) Anhelina Kalinina

The following players received entry from the qualifying draw:

- (Romania) Alexandra Dulgheru
- (Georgia (country)) Ekaterine Gorgodze
- (France) Priscilla Heise
- (Australia) Jessica Moore

== Champions ==
=== Singles ===
- (Italy) Jasmine Paolini def. (Germany) Tatjana Maria, 6–4, 2–6, 6–1

=== Doubles ===
- (Russia) Natela Dzalamidze / (Russia) Veronika Kudermetova def. (Hungary) Dalma Gálfi / (Slovenia) Dalila Jakupović, 7–6^{(7–5)}, 6–4
