= 2014 Open Féminin de Marseille =

- Date: 2–8 June
- Edition: 17th
- Category: ITF Women's Circuit
- Prize money: $100,000
- Surface: Clay
- Location: Marseille, France

Champions

Singles
- (Romania) Alexandra Dulgheru

Doubles
- (Spain) Lourdes Domínguez Lino / (Spain) Beatriz García Vidagany
← 2013 ·	Open Féminin de Marseille	· 2015 →

The 2014 Open Féminin de Marseille is a professional tennis tournament played on outdoor clay courts. It is the seventeenth edition of the tournament and part of the 2014 ITF Women's Circuit, offering a total of $100,000 in prize money. It takes place in Marseille, France, on 2–8 June 2014.

== Singles main draw entrants ==
=== Seeds ===
Country	Player	Rank^{1}	Seed
ROU	Alexandra Cadanțu	81	1
BRA	Teliana Pereira	94	2
RSA	Chanelle Scheepers	96	3
SWE	Johanna Larsson	99	4
MNE	Danka Kovinić	106	5
SRB	Jovana Jakšić	109	6
RUS	Alla Kudryavtseva	113	7
ESP	Lara Arruabarrena	122	8

- ^{1} Rankings as of 26 May 2014

=== Other entrants ===
The following players received wildcards into the singles main draw:

- (France) Manon Arcangioli
- (France) Irina Ramialison
- (France) Caroline Roméo
- (France) Laura Thorpe

The following players received entry from the qualifying draw:

- (Australia) Jarmila Gajdošová
- (Spain) Beatriz García Vidagany
- (Switzerland) Lara Michel
- (Ukraine) Olga Savchuk

The following player received entry by a protected ranking:

- (Russia) Evgeniya Rodina

== Champions ==
=== Singles ===
- (Romania) Alexandra Dulgheru def. (Sweden) Johanna Larsson 6–3, 7–5

=== Doubles ===
- (Spain) Lourdes Domínguez Lino / (Spain) Beatriz García Vidagany def. (Ukraine) Yuliya Beygelzimer / (Ukraine) Olga Savchuk 6–1, 6–2
