= 2014 Open Féminin de Marseille – Singles =

Singles
- 2014 Open Féminin de Marseille

Final
- Champion: (Romania) Alexandra Dulgheru
- Runner-up: (Sweden) Johanna Larsson
- Score: 6–3, 7–5

Events
| Singles | Doubles |
| ← 2013 · | Open Féminin de Marseille | · 2015 → |

Andrea Petkovic was the defending champion going into the competition, but couldn't defend her title as she was still competing at the French Open.

Alexandra Dulgheru won the title, defeating Johanna Larsson in the final, 6–3, 7–5.

== Seeds ==
1. (Romania) Alexandra Cadanțu (first round)
2. (Brazil) Teliana Pereira (second round)
3. (South Africa) Chanelle Scheepers (first round)
4. (Sweden) Johanna Larsson (final)
5. (Montenegro) Danka Kovinić (second round)
6. (Serbia) Jovana Jakšić (first round)
7. (Russia) Alla Kudryavtseva (first round)
8. (Spain) Lara Arruabarrena (first round)

== Main draw ==
=== Key ===
- Q = Qualifier
- WC = Wild card
- LL = Lucky loser
- Alt = Alternate
- SE = Special exempt
- PR = Protected ranking
- ITF = ITF entry
- JE = Junior exempt
- w/o = Walkover
- r = Retired
- d = Defaulted
- SR = Special ranking

=== Finals ===
Semifinals
(United States) Allie Kiick | 0 | 1
(Romania) Alexandra Dulgheru | 6 | 6
4 | (Sweden) Johanna Larsson | 6 | 6
PR | (Russia) Evgeniya Rodina | 4 | 4

Final
(Romania) Alexandra Dulgheru | 6 | 7
4 | (Sweden) Johanna Larsson | 3 | 5

=== Top half ===
First round
1 | (Romania) A Cadanțu | 2 | 2
(Paraguay) V Cepede Royg | 6 | 6
Q | (Australia) J Gajdošová | 1 | 0
(Spain) L Domínguez Lino | 6 | 6
(Luxembourg) M Minella | 0 | 2
(United States) N Gibbs | 6 | 6
(United States) A Kiick | 6 | 6
7 | (Russia) A Kudryavtseva | 3 | 4
3 | (South Africa) C Scheepers | 6 | 2 | 2
WC | (France) I Ramialison | 3 | 6 | 6
(Sweden) S Arvidsson | 6 | 6
(Spain) E Cabeza Candela | 1 | 3
WC | (France) L Thorpe | 2 | 4
Q | (Switzerland) L Michel | 6 | 6
(Romania) A Dulgheru | 7^{7} | 6
8 | (Spain) L Arruabarrena | 6^{2} | 2

Second round
(Paraguay) V Cepede Royg | 6 | 5 | 5
(Spain) L Domínguez Lino | 2 | 7 | 7
(United States) N Gibbs | 3 | 4
(United States) A Kiick | 6 | 6
WC | (France) I Ramialison | 2 | 0
(Sweden) S Arvidsson | 6 | 6
Q | (Switzerland) L Michel | 5 | 3
(Romania) A Dulgheru | 7 | 6

Quarterfinals
(Spain) L Domínguez Lino | 1 | 1
(United States) A Kiick | 6 | 6
(Sweden) S Arvidsson | 3 | 2
(Romania) A Dulgheru | 6 | 6

Semifinals
(United States) A Kiick | 0 | 1
(Romania) A Dulgheru | 6 | 6

=== Bottom half ===
First round
6 | (Serbia) J Jakšić | 6 | 3 | 3
(Kazakhstan) S Karatantcheva | 0 | 6 | 6
(Kazakhstan) Y Putintseva | 6 | 6
(Ukraine) Y Beygelzimer | 3 | 4
WC | (France) C Roméo | 3 | 5
WC | (France) M Arcangioli | 6 | 7
Q | (Ukraine) O Savchuk | 7^{7} | 3 | 0
4 | (Sweden) J Larsson | 6^{4} | 6 | 6
5 | (Montenegro) D Kovinić | 6 | 6
Q | (Spain) B García Vidagany | 2 | 1
(United States) G Min | 4 | 7^{7} | 4
(Ukraine) L Tsurenko | 6 | 6^{3} | 6
PR | (Russia) E Rodina | 6 | 5 | 6
(United States) V Duval | 2 | 7 | 0
(France) M Johansson | 5 | 1
2 | (Brazil) T Pereira | 7 | 6

Second round
(Kazakhstan) S Karatantcheva | 6 | 6
(Kazakhstan) Y Putintseva | 4 | 2
WC | (France) M Arcangioli | 2 | 1
4 | (Sweden) J Larsson | 6 | 6
5 | (Montenegro) D Kovinić | 2 | 6 | 3
(Ukraine) L Tsurenko | 6 | 4 | 6
PR | (Russia) E Rodina | 6 | 6
2 | (Brazil) T Pereira | 3 | 3

Quarterfinals
(Kazakhstan) S Karatantcheva | 3 | 6 | 6^{7}
4 | (Sweden) J Larsson | 6 | 4 | 7^{9}
(Ukraine) L Tsurenko | 6 | 6^{3} | 6^{5}
PR | (Russia) E Rodina | 1 | 7^{7} | 7^{7}

Semifinals
4 | (Sweden) J Larsson | 6 | 6
PR | (Russia) E Rodina | 4 | 4
