= 2014 Open Féminin de Marseille – Doubles =

Doubles
- 2014 Open Féminin de Marseille

Final
- Champions: (Spain) Lourdes Domínguez Lino (Spain) Beatriz García Vidagany
- Runners-up: (Ukraine) Yuliya Beygelzimer (Ukraine) Olga Savchuk
- Score: 6–1, 6–2

Events
Singles	Doubles
← 2013 ·	Open Féminin de Marseille	· 2015 →

Sandra Klemenschits and Andreja Klepač were the defending champions, having won the event in 2013, but both players chose to participate with different partners. Klemenschits chose to participate with Yulia Putintseva, losing in the first round, while Klepač chose to participate with Mandy Minella, losing in the semifinals.

Lourdes Domínguez Lino and Beatriz García Vidagany won the title, defeating Yuliya Beygelzimer and Olga Savchuk in the final, 6–1, 6–2.

== Seeds ==
1. (Ukraine) Yuliya Beygelzimer / (Ukraine) Olga Savchuk (final)
2. (Slovenia) Andreja Klepač / (Luxembourg) Mandy Minella (semifinals)
3. (Serbia) Teodora Mirčić / (France) Laura Thorpe (semifinals)
4. (United States) Nicole Melichar / (United States) Natalie Pluskota (quarterfinals)

== Draw ==
=== Key ===
- Q = Qualifier
- WC = Wild card
- LL = Lucky loser
- Alt = Alternate
- SE = Special exempt
- PR = Protected ranking
- ITF = ITF entry
- JE = Junior exempt
- w/o = Walkover
- r = Retired
- d = Defaulted
- SR = Special ranking

First round
(Paraguay) V Cepede Royg (Montenegro) D Kovinić	6	6
(France) K Laisné (France) I Ramialison	2	2
3	(Serbia) T Mirčić (France) L Thorpe	6	6
(Czech Republic) N Fraňková (Czech Republic) P Krejsová	3	4
(Russia) M Gasparyan (Russia) E Rodina	6	6^{3}	[10]
(Spain) E Cabeza Candela (Romania) A Dulgheru	2	7^{7}	[3]
(Spain) L Domínguez Lino (Spain) B García Vidagany	6	6
(Canada) H El Tabakh (United States) A Kiick	1	2
(Austria) S Klemenschits (Kazakhstan) Y Putintseva	4	3
4	(United States) N Melichar (United States) N Pluskota	6	6
(United States) V Duval (United States) N Gibbs
(Spain) L Arruabarrena (Romania) A Cadanțu	w/o
(France) M Peral (France) C Roméo	1	2
2	(Slovenia) A Klepač (Luxembourg) M Minella	6	6

Quarterfinals
1	(Ukraine) Y Beygelzimer (Ukraine) O Savchuk	6	6
(Paraguay) V Cepede Royg (Montenegro) D Kovinić	2	2
3	(Serbia) T Mirčić (France) L Thorpe	6^{2}	7	[10]
(Russia) M Gasparyan (Russia) E Rodina	7^{7}	5	[6]
(Spain) L Domínguez Lino (Spain) B García Vidagany	6	6
4	(United States) N Melichar (United States) N Pluskota	4	4
(Spain) L Arruabarrena (Romania) A Cadanțu	5	1
2	(Slovenia) A Klepač (Luxembourg) M Minella	7	6

Semifinals
1	(Ukraine) Y Beygelzimer (Ukraine) O Savchuk	2	6	[10]
3	(Serbia) T Mirčić (France) L Thorpe	6	1	[5]
(Spain) L Domínguez Lino (Spain) B García Vidagany	6	6^{4}	[11]
2	(Slovenia) A Klepač (Luxembourg) M Minella	3	7^{7}	[9]

Final
1	(Ukraine) Y Beygelzimer (Ukraine) O Savchuk	1	2
(Spain) L Domínguez Lino (Spain) B García Vidagany	6	6
