= 2017 Open Féminin de Marseille – Singles =

Singles
- 2017 Open Féminin de Marseille

Final
- Champion: (Italy) Jasmine Paolini
- Runner-up: (Germany) Tatjana Maria
- Score: 6–4, 2–6, 6–1

Events
Singles	Doubles
← 2016 ·	Open Féminin de Marseille

Danka Kovinić was the defending champion, but lost in the first round to Tessah Andrianjafitrimo.

Jasmine Paolini won the title, defeating Tatjana Maria in the final, 6–4, 2–6, 6–1.

== Seeds ==
1. (Germany) Tatjana Maria (final)
2. (Czech Republic) Denisa Allertová (quarterfinals)
3. (Montenegro) Danka Kovinić (first round)
4. (United States) Taylor Townsend (first round)
5. (Slovenia) Dalila Jakupović (second round)
6. (Spain) Sílvia Soler Espinosa (quarterfinals)
7. (United States) Kayla Day (semifinals)
8. (Hungary) Dalma Gálfi (semifinals)

== Draw ==
=== Key ===
- Q = Qualifier
- WC = Wild card
- LL = Lucky loser
- Alt = Alternate
- SE = Special exempt
- PR = Protected ranking
- ITF = ITF entry
- JE = Junior exempt
- w/o = Walkover
- r = Retired
- d = Defaulted
- SR = Special ranking

=== Finals ===
Semifinals
1	(Germany) Tatjana Maria	6	6
7	(United States) Kayla Day	1	3
(Italy) Jasmine Paolini	6	6
8	(Hungary) Dalma Gálfi	0	1

Final
1	(Germany) Tatjana Maria	4	6	1
(Italy) Jasmine Paolini	6	2	6

=== Top half ===
First round
1	(Germany) T Maria	6	6
(France) S Reix	0	2
(Thailand) V Wongteanchai	6	3	6
(France) V Razzano	0	6	1
(France) M Georges	3	6	6
(Hungary) F Stollár	6	3	0
(United States) G Min	2	4
6	(Spain) S Soler Espinosa	6	6
3	(Montenegro) D Kovinić	2	5
(France) T Andrianjafitrimo	6	7
(France) E Lechemia	4	5
Q	(France) P Heise	6	7
(Russia) E Kulichkova	6	7
Q	(Australia) J Moore	3	5
(Romania) C Dinu	0	7^{7}	2
7	(United States) K Day	6	6^{3}	6

Second round
1	(Germany) T Maria	6	6
(Thailand) V Wongteanchai	3	3
(France) M Georges	6	5	2
6	(Spain) S Soler Espinosa	3	7	6
(France) T Andrianjafitrimo	1	7	2
Q	(France) P Heise	6	5	6
(Russia) E Kulichkova	7	6^{7}	3
7	(United States) K Day	5	7^{9}	6

Quarterfinals
1	(Germany) T Maria	7^{7}	6
6	(Spain) S Soler Espinosa	6^{2}	2
Q	(France) P Heise	4	0
7	(United States) K Day	6	6

Semifinals
1	(Germany) T Maria	6	6
7	(United States) K Day	1	3

=== Bottom half ===
First round
5	(Slovenia) D Jakupović	4	6	6
Q	(Georgia (country)) E Gorgodze	6	4	3
PR	(Ukraine) A Kalinina	6	6
Q	(Romania) A Dulgheru	4	0
WC	(France) S Cakarevic	6	6
WC	(France) C Roméo	2	3
(Italy) J Paolini	6	7
4	(United States) T Townsend	2	5
8	(Hungary) D Gálfi	7^{8}	6
(Slovakia) M Hončová	6^{6}	3
(Russia) V Kudermetova	6	6
WC	(France) A Albié	1	2
(France) A Hesse	7^{7}	6
WC	(France) M Yerolymos	6^{5}	1
(Turkey) İ Soylu	1	4
2	(Czech Republic) D Allertová	6	6

Second round
5	(Slovenia) D Jakupović	6	5	0
PR	(Ukraine) A Kalinina	4	7	6
WC	(France) S Cakarevic	3	3
(Italy) J Paolini	6	6
8	(Hungary) D Gálfi	7	6
(Russia) V Kudermetova	5	2
(France) A Hesse	2	6	4
2	(Czech Republic) D Allertová	6	3	6

Quarterfinals
PR	(Ukraine) A Kalinina	2	3
(Italy) J Paolini	6	6
8	(Hungary) D Gálfi	6	6
2	(Czech Republic) D Allertová	3	1

Semifinals
(Italy) J Paolini	6	6
8	(Hungary) D Gálfi	0	1
