= 2016 Open Féminin de Marseille – Doubles =

Doubles
- 2016 Open Féminin de Marseille

Final
- Champions: (Chinese Taipei) Hsieh Su-wei (United States) Nicole Melichar
- Runners-up: (Slovakia) Jana Čepelová (Spain) Lourdes Domínguez Lino
- Score: 1–6, 6–3, [10–3]

Events
Singles	Doubles
← 2015 ·	Open Féminin de Marseille	· 2017 →

Tatiana Búa and Laura Thorpe were the defending champions, but Thorpe chose not to participate. Búa partners Alona Fomina, but lost in the first round to Hsieh Su-wei and Nicole Melichar.

Hsieh and Melichar won the champion, beating Jana Čepelová and Lourdes Domínguez Lino in the final, 1–6, 6–3, [10–3].

== Seeds ==
1. (Chinese Taipei) Hsieh Su-wei / (United States) Nicole Melichar (champions)
2. (Japan) Eri Hozumi / (Japan) Miyu Kato (quarterfinals)
3. (Spain) Lara Arruabarrena / (Spain) María Teresa Torró Flor (semifinals, withdrew)
4. (Australia) Jessica Moore / (Thailand) Varatchaya Wongteanchai (semifinals)

== Draw ==
=== Key ===
- Q = Qualifier
- WC = Wild card
- LL = Lucky loser
- Alt = Alternate
- SE = Special exempt
- PR = Protected ranking
- ITF = ITF entry
- JE = Junior exempt
- w/o = Walkover
- r = Retired
- d = Defaulted
- SR = Special ranking

First round
1	(Chinese Taipei) S-w Hsieh (United States) N Melichar	7^{7}	6
(Argentina) T Búa (Ukraine) A Fomina	6^{5}	3
(Croatia) D Banovec (France) C Roméo	2	6	[10]
(Belgium) E Boeykens (France) I Ramialison	6	3	[7]
3	(Spain) L Arruabarrena (Spain) MT Torró Flor	3	6	[11]
(France) V Muntean (Russia) N Vikhlyantseva	6	2	[9]
(Paraguay) V Cepede Royg (France) A Lim	6	7^{11}
(Venezuela) A Gámiz (Greece) M Sakkari	2	6^{9}
(France) A Albié (France) M Peral	6	6
WC	(France) A Ramé (France) V Rémy	2	1
WC	(France) L Burguière (France) C Tanielian	3	0
4	(Australia) J Moore (Thailand) V Wongteanchai	6	6
WC	(France) F Ferro (France) M Yerolymos	4	4
(Slovakia) J Čepelová (Spain) L Domínguez Lino	6	6
(Japan) M Eguchi (Switzerland) J Teichmann	7^{7}	3	[10]
2	(Japan) E Hozumi (Japan) M Kato	6^{3}	6	[12]

Quarterfinals
1	(Chinese Taipei) S-w Hsieh (United States) N Melichar	6	6
(Croatia) D Banovec (France) C Roméo	1	0
3	(Spain) L Arruabarrena (Spain) MT Torró Flor	6	3	[10]
(Paraguay) V Cepede Royg (France) A Lim	3	6	[8]
(France) A Albié (France) M Peral	1	6^{4}
4	(Australia) J Moore (Thailand) V Wongteanchai	6	7^{7}
(Slovakia) J Čepelová (Spain) L Domínguez Lino	6	6
2	(Japan) E Hozumi (Japan) M Kato	3	1

Semifinals
1	(Chinese Taipei) S-w Hsieh (United States) N Melichar	w/o
3	(Spain) L Arruabarrena (Spain) MT Torró Flor
4	(Australia) J Moore (Thailand) V Wongteanchai	5	5
(Slovakia) J Čepelová (Spain) L Domínguez Lino	7	7

Final
1	(Chinese Taipei) S-w Hsieh (United States) N Melichar	1	6	[10]
(Slovakia) J Čepelová (Spain) L Domínguez Lino	6	3	[3]
