= 2015 Open Féminin de Marseille – Doubles =

Doubles
- 2015 Open Féminin de Marseille

Final
- Champions: (Argentina) Tatiana Búa (France) Laura Thorpe
- Runners-up: (United States) Nicole Melichar (Ukraine) Maryna Zanevska
- Score: 6–3, 3–6, [10–6]

Events
Singles	Doubles
← 2014 ·	Open Féminin de Marseille	· 2016 →

Lourdes Domínguez Lino and Beatriz García Vidagany were the defending champions, but García Vidagany chose not to participate. Domínguez Lino partnered Mariana Duque but lost in the first round.

Tatiana Búa and Laura Thorpe won the title, defeating Nicole Melichar and Maryna Zanevska in the final, 6–3, 3–6, [10–6].

== Seeds ==
1. (Serbia) Aleksandra Krunić / (China) Wang Yafan (semifinals)
2. (Ukraine) Kateryna Bondarenko / (United States) Anna Tatishvili (quarterfinals; retired)
3. (United States) Nicole Melichar / (Ukraine) Maryna Zanevska (final)
4. (Georgia (country)) Oksana Kalashnikova / (Russia) Evgeniya Rodina (first round)

== Draw ==
=== Key ===
- Q = Qualifier
- WC = Wild card
- LL = Lucky loser
- Alt = Alternate
- SE = Special exempt
- PR = Protected ranking
- ITF = ITF entry
- JE = Junior exempt
- w/o = Walkover
- r = Retired
- d = Defaulted
- SR = Special ranking

First round
1	(Serbia) A Krunić (China) Y Wang	6	6
(Ukraine) O Korashvili (Belarus) L Marozava	0	1
WC	(Croatia) D Banovec (France) C Roméo	3	5
(Slovakia) J Čepelová (Spain) A Fernández Rabener	6	7
4	(Georgia (country)) O Kalashnikova (Russia) E Rodina	6	6^{9}	[9]
(Paraguay) V Cepede Royg (United States) A Muhammad	4	7^{11}	[11]
(Argentina) T Búa (France) L Thorpe	6	2	[11]
(Belarus) A Sasnovich (Romania) PM Țig	1	6	[9]
WC	(France) M Arcangioli (France) C Paquet	6	4	[9]
WC	(France) A Hesse (France) S Reix	4	6	[11]
(Spain) L Domínguez Lino (Colombia) M Duque	1	6	[7]
3	(United States) N Melichar (Ukraine) M Zanevska	6	3	[10]
Q	(Belgium) E Boeykens (Paraguay) M González	6	6
(France) I Ramialison (France) C Sibille	1	3
Q	(Canada) F Abanda (United States) S Vickery	6^{1}	2
2	(Ukraine) K Bondarenko (United States) A Tatishvili	7^{7}	6

Quarterfinals
1	(Serbia) A Krunić (China) Y Wang	6	6
(Slovakia) J Čepelová (Spain) A Fernández Rabener	3	0
(Paraguay) V Cepede Royg (United States) A Muhammad	2	7^{7}	[7]
(Argentina) T Búa (France) L Thorpe	6	6^{1}	[10]
WC	(France) A Hesse (France) S Reix	3	1
3	(United States) N Melichar (Ukraine) M Zanevska	6	6
Q	(Belgium) E Boeykens (Paraguay) M González	2	0
2	(Ukraine) K Bondarenko (United States) A Tatishvili	6	0^{r}

Semifinals
1	(Serbia) A Krunić (China) Y Wang	6	2	[6]
(Argentina) T Búa (France) L Thorpe	0	6	[10]
3	(United States) N Melichar (Ukraine) M Zanevska	6	2	[10]
Q	(Belgium) E Boeykens (Paraguay) M González	4	6	[4]

Final
(Argentina) T Búa (France) L Thorpe	6	3	[10]
3	(United States) N Melichar (Ukraine) M Zanevska	3	6	[6]
