= 2015 Open Féminin de Marseille – Singles =

Singles
- 2015 Open Féminin de Marseille

Final
- Champion: (Romania) Monica Niculescu
- Runner-up: (France) Pauline Parmentier
- Score: 6–2, 7–5

Events
Singles	Doubles
← 2014 ·	Open Féminin de Marseille	· 2016 →

Alexandra Dulgheru was the defending champion, but chose not to participate.

Monica Niculescu won the title, defeating Pauline Parmentier in the final, 6–2, 7–5.

== Seeds ==
1. (Estonia) Kaia Kanepi (first round)
2. (Romania) Monica Niculescu (champion)
3. (Germany) Tatjana Maria (first round)
4. (Slovenia) Polona Hercog (quarterfinals)
5. (Serbia) Aleksandra Krunić (second round)
6. (Czech Republic) Denisa Allertová (quarterfinals)
7. (Russia) Evgeniya Rodina (first round)
8. (France) Pauline Parmentier (final)

== Main draw ==
=== Key ===
- Q = Qualifier
- WC = Wild card
- LL = Lucky loser
- Alt = Alternate
- SE = Special exempt
- PR = Protected ranking
- ITF = ITF entry
- JE = Junior exempt
- w/o = Walkover
- r = Retired
- d = Defaulted
- SR = Special ranking

=== Finals ===
Semifinals
8	(France) Pauline Parmentier	4	6	6
(Ukraine) Kateryna Bondarenko	6	4	2
(Colombia) Mariana Duque	3	6	3
2	(Romania) Monica Niculescu	6	3	6

Final
8	(France) Pauline Parmentier	2	5
2	(Romania) Monica Niculescu	6	7

=== Top half ===
First round
1	(Estonia) K Kanepi	3	7	2
(Belarus) A Sasnovich	6	5	6
WC	(France) C de Bernardi	3	2
WC	(France) C Paquet	6	6
WC	(France) A Hesse	6	3	6
WC	(France) C Roméo	1	6	2
(Romania) PM Țig	1^{r}
8	(France) P Parmentier	3
4	(Slovenia) P Hercog	6	6
(China) Y Wang	4	0
(Ukraine) M Zanevska	6	3	7
(Switzerland) S Vögele	3	6	5
(United States) A Tatishvili	2	3
(Ukraine) K Bondarenko	6	6
(Russia) A Panova	6	6
7	(Russia) E Rodina	4	2

Second round
(Belarus) A Sasnovich	6^{4}	6^{3}
WC	(France) C Paquet	7^{7}	7^{7}
WC	(France) A Hesse	1	2
8	(France) P Parmentier	6	6
4	(Slovenia) P Hercog	6	6
(Ukraine) M Zanevska	3	0
(Ukraine) K Bondarenko	6	6
(Russia) A Panova	2	1

Quarterfinals
WC	(France) C Paquet	4	4
8	(France) P Parmentier	6	6
4	(Slovenia) P Hercog	1	3
(Ukraine) K Bondarenko	6	6

Semifinals
8	(France) P Parmentier	4	6	6
(Ukraine) K Bondarenko	6	4	2

=== Bottom half ===
First round
5	(Serbia) A Krunić	6	6
Q	(Georgia (country)) O Kalashnikova	3	2
(Colombia) M Duque	6	5	6
(Netherlands) R Hogenkamp	3	7	4
(United States) A Muhammad	6	2	4
(Paraguay) V Cepede Royg	1	6	6
Q	(Latvia) A Sevastova	7^{7}	6
3	(Germany) T Maria	6^{0}	1
6	(Czech Republic) D Allertová	5	6	6
(Spain) L Domínguez Lino	7	1	1
(Slovakia) J Čepelová	7^{7}	6
Q	(France) C Sibille	6^{5}	4
Q	(France) A Lim	6	2	3
(United States) S Vickery	0	6	6
(Canada) F Abanda	3	6^{3}
2	(Romania) M Niculescu	6	7^{7}

Second round
5	(Serbia) A Krunić	2	3
(Colombia) M Duque	6	6
(Paraguay) V Cepede Royg	6	4	3
Q	(Latvia) A Sevastova	1	6	6
6	(Czech Republic) D Allertová	3	7^{7}	6
(Slovakia) J Čepelová	6	6^{3}	4
(United States) S Vickery	2	7^{8}	4
2	(Romania) M Niculescu	6	6^{6}	6

Quarterfinals
(Colombia) M Duque	6	6
Q	(Latvia) A Sevastova	1	4
6	(Czech Republic) D Allertová	2	5
2	(Romania) M Niculescu	6	7

Semifinals
(Colombia) M Duque	3	6	3
2	(Romania) M Niculescu	6	3	6
