= 2013 Open Féminin de Marseille =

- Date: 3–9 June
- Edition: 16th
- Location: Marseille, France

Champions

Singles
- (Germany) Andrea Petkovic

Doubles
- (Austria) Sandra Klemenschits / (Slovenia) Andreja Klepač
← 2012 ·	Open Féminin de Marseille	· 2014 →

The 2013 Open Féminin de Marseille was a professional tennis tournament played on outdoor clay courts. It was the sixteenth edition of the tournament which was part of the 2013 ITF Women's Circuit, offering a total of $100,000 in prize money. It took place in Marseille, France, on 3–9 June 2013.

== WTA entrants ==
=== Seeds ===
Country	Player	Rank^{1}	Seed
ESP	Anabel Medina Garrigues	68	1
LUX	Mandy Minella	76	2
PUR	Monica Puig	86	3
ROU	Alexandra Cadanțu	91	4
FRA	Mathilde Johansson	94	5
NED	Arantxa Rus	100	6
HUN	Tímea Babos	103	7
GER	Tatjana Maria	104	8

- ^{1} Rankings as of 27 May 2013

=== Other entrants ===
The following players received wildcards into the singles main draw:

- (France) Myrtille Georges
- (France) Mathilde Johansson
- (France) Victoria Larrière
- (Germany) Andrea Petkovic

The following players received entry from the qualifying draw:

- (France) Amandine Hesse
- (Ukraine) Lyudmyla Kichenok
- (United States) Grace Min
- (France) Irina Ramialison

The following players received entry into the singles main draw as lucky losers:

- (United States) Jill Craybas
- (Argentina) María Irigoyen
- (France) Anaève Pain

== Champions ==
=== Singles ===
- (Germany) Andrea Petkovic def. (Spain) Anabel Medina Garrigues 6–4, 6–2

=== Doubles ===
- (Austria) Sandra Klemenschits / (Slovenia) Andreja Klepač def. (United States) Asia Muhammad / (United States) Allie Will 1–6, 6–4, [10–5]
