= 2002 Tashkent Open – Singles =

Singles
- 2002 Tashkent Open

Final
- Champion: (Switzerland) Marie-Gaïané Mikaelian
- Runner-up: (Belarus) Tatiana Poutchek
- Score: 6–4, 6–4

Details
- Draw: 32
- Seeds: 8

Events
Singles	Doubles
← 2001 ·	Tashkent Open	· 2003 →

Bianka Lamade was the defending champion from 2001, but she chose not to compete in 2002.

Marie-Gaïané Mikaelian won the title in two sets over Tatiana Poutchek.

== Draw ==
=== Seeds ===
1. (Switzerland) Marie-Gaïané Mikaelian (Winner)
2. (Belarus) Tatiana Poutchek (finals)
3. (Italy) Tathiana Garbin (semi finals)
4. (Netherlands) Seda Noorlander (first round)
5. (Australia) Evie Dominikovic (first round)
6. (Colombia) Fabiola Zuluaga (first round)
7. (Czech Republic) Alena Vašková (first round)
8. (Venezuela) Milagros Sequera (first round)

=== Key ===
- Q = Qualifier
- WC = Wild card
- LL = Lucky loser
- Alt = Alternate
- SE = Special exempt
- PR = Protected ranking
- ITF = ITF entry
- JE = Junior exempt
- w/o = Walkover
- r = Retired
- d = Defaulted
- SR = Special ranking

=== Finals ===
Semifinals
1	(Switzerland) Marie-Gaïané Mikaelian	6	6
3	(Italy) Tathiana Garbin	2	1
(Italy) Roberta Vinci	6^{3}	6^{5}
2	(Belarus) Tatiana Poutchek	7	7

Final
1	(Switzerland) Marie-Gaïané Mikaelian	6	6
2	(Belarus) Tatiana Poutchek	4	4

=== Top half ===
First round
1	(Switzerland) M-G Mikaelian	6^{2}	6	6
LL	(Ukraine) Y Fedak	7	2	1
(Spain) N Llagostera Vives	0	2
(Venezuela) M Vento-Kabchi	6	6
(Czech Republic) K Koukalová	3	0
Q	(Russia) O Kalyuzhnaya	6	6
(Belarus) N Ostrovskaya	6	6
7	(Czech Republic) A Vašková	0	4
3	(Italy) T Garbin	6	7
WC	(Uzbekistan) A Amanmuradova	2	5
(Germany) Ad Barna	6	6
(Spain) M.J. Martínez Sánchez	3	4
(Italy) M.E Camerin	0	7	6
(Belarus) O Barabanschikova	6	5	1
(Canada) M-È Pelletier	6	6
6	(Colombia) F Zuluaga	2	3

Second round
1	(Switzerland) M-G Mikaelian	6	6
(Venezuela) M Vento-Kabchi	4	3
Q	(Russia) O Kalyuzhnaya	1	0	r
(Belarus) N Ostrovskaya	6	1
3	(Italy) T Garbin	6	6
(Germany) Ad Barna	1	3
(Italy) M.E Camerin	6	7
(Canada) M-È Pelletier	0	5

Quarterfinals
1	(Switzerland) M-G Mikaelian	6	6
(Belarus) N Ostrovskaya	0	1
3	(Italy) T Garbin	6	6
(Italy) M.E Camerin	4	1

Semifinals
1	(Switzerland) M-G Mikaelian	6	6
3	(Italy) T Garbin	2	1

=== Bottom half ===
First round
5	(Australia) E Dominikovic	5	3
(Italy) R Vinci	7	6
WC	(Uzbekistan) I Israilova	6	6^{4}	1
(Czech Republic) L Němečková	2	7	6
(Ukraine) T Perebiynis	6	6
(Russia) G Fokina	4	2
(Russia) D Safina	6	6
4	(Netherlands) S Noorlander	4	1
8	(Venezuela) M Sequera	5	6	3
Q	(Russia) L Skavronskaia	7	2	6
(Colombia) C Castaño	7	3	4
(Czech Republic) R Voráčová	6^{4}	6	6
Q	(Russia) G Fattakhetdinova	1	2
(Netherlands) A van Exel	6	6
Q	(Spain) M Gallifa Puigdesens	2	3
2	(Belarus) T Poutchek	6	6

Second round
(Italy) R Vinci	6	6
(Czech Republic) L Němečková	4	2
(Ukraine) T Perebiynis	6	4	7
(Russia) D Safina	3	6	6^{6}
Q	(Russia) L Skavronskaia	6	6
(Czech Republic) R Voráčová	4	4
(Netherlands) A van Exel	7	4	4
2	(Belarus) T Poutchek	6^{5}	6	6

Quarterfinals
(Italy) R Vinci	0	6	6
(Ukraine) T Perebiynis	6	4	4
Q	(Russia) L Skavronskaia	4	1
2	(Belarus) T Poutchek	6	6

Semifinals
(Italy) R Vinci	6^{3}	6^{5}
2	(Belarus) T Poutchek	7	7
