= 2013 Open Féminin de Marseille – Doubles =

Doubles
- 2013 Open Féminin de Marseille

Final
- Champions: (Austria) Sandra Klemenschits (Slovenia) Andreja Klepač
- Runners-up: (United States) Asia Muhammad (United States) Allie Will
- Score: 1–6, 6–4, [10–5]

Events
Singles	Doubles
← 2012 ·	Open Féminin de Marseille	· 2014 →

Séverine Beltrame and Laura Thorpe were the defending champions, having won the event in 2012, but both players chose not to defend their title.

Sandra Klemenschits and Andreja Klepač won the title, defeating Asia Muhammad and Allie Will in the final, 1–6, 6–4, [10–5].

== Seeds ==
1. (United States) Julia Cohen / (Germany) Tatjana Maria (first round)
2. (Ukraine) Irina Buryachok / (Israel) Julia Glushko (first round)
3. (Austria) Sandra Klemenschits / (Slovenia) Andreja Klepač
4. (Ukraine) Lyudmyla Kichenok / (Ukraine) Nadiya Kichenok (quarterfinals)

== Draw ==
=== Key ===
- Q = Qualifier
- WC = Wild card
- LL = Lucky loser
- Alt = Alternate
- SE = Special exempt
- PR = Protected ranking
- ITF = ITF entry
- JE = Junior exempt
- w/o = Walkover
- r = Retired
- d = Defaulted
- SR = Special ranking

First round
1	(United States) J Cohen (Germany) T Maria	3	3
(Romania) A Cadanțu (United States) J Pegula	6	6
(United States) A Muhammad (United States) A Will	5	6	[10]
WC	(France) C Feuerstein (France) I Ramialison	7	1	[5]
4	(Ukraine) L Kichenok (Ukraine) N Kichenok	w/o
(Russia) V Solovyeva (Ukraine) M Zanevska
(Argentina) M Irigoyen (Argentina) P Ormaechea	6	6
WC	(Chile) C Costa Melgar (France) A Hesse	4	2
(Italy) N Clerico (Czech Republic) N Fraňková	6	6
(Thailand) N Lertpitaksinchai (Thailand) P Plipuech	3	3
WC	(Croatia) D Banoveć (France) C Roméo	0	4
3	(Austria) S Klemenschits (Slovenia) A Klepač	6	6
(Spain) I Ferrer Suárez (Netherlands) A Rus	6	6
(Denmark) M Ejdesgaard (United States) J Elie	2	2
(Russia) M Kondratieva (Bulgaria) A Naydenova	6	1	[10]
2	(Ukraine) I Buryachok (Israel) J Glushko	4	6	[6]

Quarterfinals
(Romania) A Cadanțu (United States) J Pegula	4	0
(United States) A Muhammad (United States) A Will	6	6
4	(Ukraine) L Kichenok (Ukraine) N Kichenok	5	6	[7]
(Argentina) M Irigoyen (Argentina) P Ormaechea	7	3	[10]
(Italy) N Clerico (Czech Republic) N Fraňková	4	2
3	(Austria) S Klemenschits (Slovenia) A Klepač	6	6
(Spain) I Ferrer Suárez (Netherlands) A Rus	6	6
(Russia) M Kondratieva (Bulgaria) A Naydenova	1	2

Semifinals
(United States) A Muhammad (United States) A Will	6	6
(Argentina) M Irigoyen (Argentina) P Ormaechea	4	2
3	(Austria) S Klemenschits (Slovenia) A Klepač	6	7
(Spain) I Ferrer Suárez (Netherlands) A Rus	2	5

Final
(United States) A Muhammad (United States) A Will	6	4	[5]
3	(Austria) S Klemenschits (Slovenia) A Klepač	1	6	[10]
