= 2013 Open Féminin de Marseille – Singles =

Singles
- 2013 Open Féminin de Marseille

Final
- Champion: (Germany) Andrea Petkovic
- Runner-up: (Spain) Anabel Medina Garrigues
- Score: 6–4, 6–2

Events
Singles	Doubles
← 2012 ·	Open Féminin de Marseille	· 2014 →

Lourdes Domínguez Lino was the defending champion, having won the event in 2012, but she chose not to defend her title.

Andrea Petkovic won the title, defeating Anabel Medina Garrigues in the final, 6–4, 6–2.

== Seeds ==
1. (Spain) Anabel Medina Garrigues (final)
2. ~~(Luxembourg) Mandy Minella~~ (withdrew)
3. (Puerto Rico) Monica Puig (semifinals)
4. (Romania) Alexandra Cadanțu (quarterfinals)
5. (France) Mathilde Johansson (second round)
6. (Netherlands) Arantxa Rus (quarterfinals)
7. (Hungary) Tímea Babos (first round)
8. (Germany) Tatjana Maria (second round; retired)

== Main draw ==
=== Key ===
- Q = Qualifier
- WC = Wild card
- LL = Lucky loser
- Alt = Alternate
- SE = Special exempt
- PR = Protected ranking
- ITF = ITF entry
- JE = Junior exempt
- w/o = Walkover
- r = Retired
- d = Defaulted
- SR = Special ranking

=== Finals ===
Semifinals
1	(Spain) Anabel Medina Garrigues	6	7^{7}
(Slovenia) Polona Hercog	4	6^{3}
3	(Puerto Rico) Monica Puig	0	0
WC	(Germany) Andrea Petkovic	6	6

Final
1	(Spain) Anabel Medina Garrigues	4	2
WC	(Germany) Andrea Petkovic	6	6

=== Top half ===
First round
1	(Spain) A Medina Garrigues	6	6
Q	(United States) G Min	2	2
(Kazakhstan) S Karatantcheva	6	6
(Russia) D Gavrilova	2	1
LL	(France) A Pain	2	0
(United States) J Pegula	6	6
WC	(France) M Georges	2	7	2
6	(Netherlands) A Rus	6	5	6
4	(Romania) A Cadanțu	7	6
Q	(France) I Ramialison	5	3
(Ukraine) N Kichenok	7	4	6
(Russia) A Panova	5	6	3
WC	(France) V Larrière	0	1
(Austria) Y Meusburger	6	6
(Slovenia) P Hercog	7^{8}	6
7	(Hungary) T Babos	6^{6}	2

Second round
1	(Spain) A Medina Garrigues	6	6
(Kazakhstan) S Karatantcheva	4	2
(United States) J Pegula	5	3
6	(Netherlands) A Rus	7	6
4	(Romania) A Cadanțu	6	6
(Ukraine) N Kichenok	4	3
(Austria) Y Meusburger	6^{7}	6^{4}
(Slovenia) P Hercog	7^{9}	7^{7}

Quarterfinals
1	(Spain) A Medina Garrigues	6	6
6	(Netherlands) A Rus	2	4
4	(Romania) A Cadanțu	1	2
(Slovenia) P Hercog	6	6

Semifinals
1	(Spain) A Medina Garrigues	6	7^{7}
(Slovenia) P Hercog	4	6^{3}

=== Bottom half ===
First round
8	(Germany) T Maria	6	6
Q	(Ukraine) L Kichenok	2	4
(Russia) V Solovyeva	3	0^{r}
(France) C Feuerstein	6	2
(Brazil) T Pereira	6	6
Q	(France) A Hesse	2	1
(Ukraine) M Zanevska	6^{5}	6	6^{8}
3	(Puerto Rico) M Puig	7^{7}	4	7^{10}
5/WC	(France) M Johansson	4	6	6
(Israel) J Glushko	6	3	4
WC	(Germany) A Petkovic	6	7
(Germany) A-L Friedsam	2	5
(Argentina) P Ormaechea	6	6
LL	(United States) J Craybas	4	1
(United States) J Cohen	2	5
LL	(Argentina) M Irigoyen	6	7

Second round
8	(Germany) T Maria	5	0^{r}
(France) C Feuerstein	7	1
(Brazil) T Pereira	4	7	6^{4}
3	(Puerto Rico) M Puig	6	5	7^{7}
5/WC	(France) M Johansson	3	4
WC	(Germany) A Petkovic	6	6
(Argentina) P Ormaechea	4	6	6
LL	(Argentina) M Irigoyen	6	3	0

Quarterfinals
(France) C Feuerstein	6	3	2
3	(Puerto Rico) M Puig	3	6	6
WC	(Germany) A Petkovic	6	6
(Argentina) P Ormaechea	1	3

Semifinals
3	(Puerto Rico) M Puig	0	0
WC	(Germany) A Petkovic	6	6
