= 2002 Tashkent Open – Doubles =

Doubles
- 2002 Tashkent Open

Final
- Champions: (Ukraine) Tatiana Perebiynis (Belarus) Tatiana Poutchek
- Runners-up: (Germany) Mia Buric (Russia) Galina Fokina
- Score: 7–5, 6–2

Details
- Draw: 16
- Seeds: 4

Events
Singles	Doubles
- Tashkent Open

Petra Mandula and Patricia Wartusch were the defending champions from 2001, but they chose not to compete in 2002.

Tatiana Perebiynis and Tatiana Poutchek defended their title, by defeating Mia Buric and Galina Fokina 7–5, and 6–2 in the final.

== Seeds ==
1. (Australia) Evie Dominikovic / (Italy) Tathiana Garbin (first round)
2. (Ukraine) Tatiana Perebiynis / (Belarus) Tatiana Poutchek (champion)
3. (Italy) Maria Elena Camerin / (Italy) Roberta Vinci (quarterfinals)
4. (Netherlands) Seda Noorlander / (Venezuela) María Vento-Kabchi (first round)

== Draw ==
Key

- Q = Qualifier
- WC = Wild card
- LL = Lucky loser
- Alt = Alternate
- ITF = ITF entry
- PR = Protected ranking
- SR = Special ranking
- SE = Special exempt
- JE = Junior exempt
- JR = Junior Accelerator Programme entrant
- CO = College Accelerator Programme entrant
- NG = Next Gen Accelerator Program entrant
- w/o = Walkover
- r = Retired
- d = Defaulted

=== Draw ===
First round
1	(Australia) E Dominikovic (Italy) T Garbin	4	4
(Spain) N Llagostera Vives (Spain) M.J. Martínez Sánchez	6	6
WC	(Uzbekistan) A Amanmuradova (Uzbekistan) I Israilova	6	4	6
(Russia) A Bastrikova (Ukraine) Y Fedak	3	6	3
3	(Italy) M.E Camerin (Italy) R Vinci	6	6
(Czech Republic) K Koukalová (Czech Republic) A Vašková	1	3
(Czech Republic) L Němečková (Venezuela) M Sequera	6	4	4
(Germany) M Buric (Russia) G Fokina	0	6	6
(Germany) Ad Barna (Russia) L Skavronskaia	4	6	4
(Canada) M-È Pelletier (Czech Republic) R Voráčová	6	4	6
(Russia) G Fattakhetdinova (Russia) E Kozhokina	6	6
4	(Netherlands) S Noorlander (Venezuela) M Vento-Kabchi	1	3
Q	(Ukraine) O Antypina (Belarus) O Barabanschikova	6	2	4
(United States) E Schmidt (Netherlands) A van Exel	4	6	6
(Belarus) N Ostrovskaya (Russia) D Safina	6^{1}	1
2	(Ukraine) T Perebiynis (Belarus) T Poutchek	7	6

Quarterfinals
(Spain) N Llagostera Vives (Spain) M.J. Martínez Sánchez	6	6
WC	(Uzbekistan) A Amanmuradova (Uzbekistan) I Israilova	4	4
3	(Italy) M.E Camerin (Italy) R Vinci	2	3
(Germany) M Buric (Russia) G Fokina	6	6
(Canada) M-È Pelletier (Czech Republic) R Voráčová	0	4
(Russia) G Fattakhetdinova (Russia) E Kozhokina	6	6
(United States) E Schmidt (Netherlands) A van Exel	4	3
2	(Ukraine) T Perebiynis (Belarus) T Poutchek	6	6

Semifinals
(Spain) N Llagostera Vives (Spain) M.J. Martínez Sánchez	1	6^{4}
4	(Germany) M Buric (Russia) G Fokina	6	7
(Russia) G Fattakhetdinova (Russia) E Kozhokina	4	3
2	(Ukraine) T Perebiynis (Belarus) T Poutchek	6	6

Final
(Germany) M Buric (Russia) G Fokina	5	2
2	(Ukraine) T Perebiynis (Belarus) T Poutchek	7	6
