= 2017 Open Féminin de Marseille – Doubles =

Doubles
- 2017 Open Féminin de Marseille

Final
- Champion: (Russia) Natela Dzalamidze (Russia) Veronika Kudermetova
- Runner-up: (Hungary) Dalma Gálfi (Slovenia) Dalila Jakupović
- Score: 7–6^{(7–5)}, 6–4

Events
Singles	Doubles
← 2016 ·	Open Féminin de Marseille	· 2018 →

Hsieh Su-wei and Nicole Melichar were the defending champions, but both players chose not to participate.

Natela Dzalamidze and Veronika Kudermetova won the title, defeating Dalma Gálfi and Dalila Jakupović in the final, 7–6^{(7–5)}, 6–4.

== Seeds ==
1. (Ukraine) Lyudmyla Kichenok / (Ukraine) Nadiia Kichenok (semifinals)
2. (Turkey) İpek Soylu / (United States) Taylor Townsend (quarterfinals, withdrew)
3. (Russia) Natela Dzalamidze / (Russia) Veronika Kudermetova (champions)
4. (Argentina) María Irigoyen / (Montenegro) Danka Kovinić (first round)

== Draw ==
=== Key ===
- Q = Qualifier
- WC = Wild card
- LL = Lucky loser
- Alt = Alternate
- SE = Special exempt
- PR = Protected ranking
- ITF = ITF entry
- JE = Junior exempt
- w/o = Walkover
- r = Retired
- d = Defaulted
- SR = Special ranking

First round
1	(Ukraine) L Kichenok (Ukraine) N Kichenok	6	6
WC	(France) E Léné (France) C Roméo	0	3
(France) T Andrianjafitrimo (France) A Hesse	5	7	[10]
(Australia) J Moore (Thailand) V Wongteanchai	7	5	[5]
3	(Russia) N Dzalamidze (Russia) V Kudermetova	7^{7}	6
WC	(Romania) A Dulgheru (Ukraine) A Kalinina	6^{4}	1
(Slovakia) M Hončová (France) S Reix	3	5
(Ukraine) A Fomina (Georgia (country)) E Gorgodze	6	7
(France) S Cakarevic (France) M Yerolymos	6	0	[5]
(Hungary) D Gálfi (Slovenia) D Jakupović	3	6	[10]
(Brazil) G Cé (Romania) C Dinu	6	6
4	(Argentina) M Irigoyen (Montenegro) D Kovinić	3	3
(France) V Muntean (France) M Partaud	1	0
(United States) K Day (Hungary) F Stollár	6	6
WC	(France) M Armitano (France) E Lechemia	6	5	[5]
2	(Turkey) İ Soylu (United States) T Townsend	4	7	[10]

Quarterfinals
1	(Ukraine) L Kichenok (Ukraine) N Kichenok	6	7^{7}
(France) T Andrianjafitrimo (France) A Hesse	0	6^{4}
3	(Russia) N Dzalamidze (Russia) V Kudermetova	6	6
(Ukraine) A Fomina (Georgia (country)) E Gorgodze	4	4
(Hungary) D Gálfi (Slovenia) D Jakupović	6	6
(Brazil) G Cé (Romania) C Dinu	3	3
(United States) K Day (Hungary) F Stollár	w/o
2	(Turkey) İ Soylu (United States) T Townsend

Semifinals
1	(Ukraine) L Kichenok (Ukraine) N Kichenok	1	3
3	(Russia) N Dzalamidze (Russia) V Kudermetova	6	6
(Hungary) D Gálfi (Slovenia) D Jakupović	w/o
(United States) K Day (Hungary) F Stollár

Final
3	(Russia) N Dzalamidze (Russia) V Kudermetova	7^{7}	6
(Hungary) D Gálfi (Slovenia) D Jakupović	6^{5}	4
