= Marta Fraga =

Spanish tennis player (born 1985)

- Full name: Marta Fraga Pérez
- Country (sports): Spain
- Born: 4 February 1985 (age 40); Zaragoza, Spain
- Turned pro: 2000
- Plays: Right-handed (two-handed backhand)
- Prize money: $41,250

Singles
- Career record: 138–57
- Career titles: 9 ITF
- Highest ranking: No. 270 (11 October 2004)

Doubles
- Career record: 61–29
- Career titles: 9 ITF
- Highest ranking: No. 342 (29 November 2004)

Marta Fraga Pérez (born 4 February 1985) is a former professional Spanish tennis player.

She won the French Open girls’ doubles championship in 2003 with her compatriot Adriana González Peñas.

As a professional, her highest career singles ranking is world No. 270, achieved on 11 October 2004. In November 2004, she peaked at No. 342 in the doubles rankings.

In her career, Fraga won nine singles and nine doubles titles on the ITF Circuit.

== Junior Grand Slam finals ==
=== Doubles (1–0) ===
Outcome	Year	Tournament	Surface	Partner	Opponents	Score
Winner	2003	French Open	Clay	(Spain) Adriana González Peñas	(Czech Republic) Kateřina Böhmová (Netherlands) Michaëlla Krajicek	6–0, 6–3

== ITF finals ==
$100,000 tournaments
$75,000 tournaments
$50,000 tournaments
$25,000 tournaments
$10,000 tournaments

=== Singles: 13 (9–4) ===
Result	No.	Date	Tournament	Surface	Opponent	Score
Win	1.	25 November 2001	ITF Mallorca, Spain	Clay	(Spain) Adriana González Peñas	0–6, 6–2, 6–3
Loss	2.	17 February 2002	Vilamoura, Portugal	Hard	(Netherlands) Susanne Trik	7–6^{(5)}, 4–6, 2–6
Win	3.	27 October 2002	Seville, Spain	Clay	(Croatia) Ivana Višić	7–5, 6–4
Win	4.	2 March 2003	Grand Canary, Spain	Clay	(Italy) Silvia Disderi	6–3, 7–5
Loss	5.	11 May 2003	Tortosa, Spain	Clay	(Spain) Adriana González Peñas	2–6, 6–4, 3–6
Win	6.	13 July 2003	Getxo, Spain	Clay	(Spain) Adriana González Peñas	w/o
Loss	7.	31 August 2003	Coimbra, Portugal	Hard	(Spain) Adriana González Peñas	4–6, 3–6
Win	8.	28 September 2003	Murcia, Spain	Clay	(Spain) Pilar Escandell-Planells	1–6, 6–2, 6–2
Win	9.	23 November 2003	Barcelona, Spain	Clay	(Serbia) Ana Ivanovic	6–4, 5–7, 6–4
Loss	10.	21 March 2004	Rome, Italy	Clay	(Spain) Lourdes Domínguez Lino	1–6, 2–6
Win	11.	3 May 2004	Tortosa, Spain	Clay	(Spain) Claudia Jorda-Fernandez	6–4, 6–4
Win	12.	10 May 2004	Monzón, Spain	Hard	(Switzerland) Aliénor Tricerri	6–0, 6–4
Win	13.	23 May 2004	Santa Cruz de Tenerife, Spain	Hard	(Spain) Núria Roig	7–5, 6–2

=== Doubles: 14 (9–5) ===
Result	No.	Date	Tournament	Surface	Partner	Opponents	Score
Loss	1.	17 February 2002	ITF Vilamoura, Portugal	Hard	(Romania) Liana Ungur	(Japan) Maki Arai (Japan) Remi Tezuka	2–6, 5–7
Win	2.	12 May 2002	Tortosa, Spain	Clay	(Spain) María José Sánchez Alayeto	(Spain) Adriana González Peñas (Spain) Gabriela Velasco Andreu	7–5, 6–1
Win	3.	14 July 2002	Getxo, Spain	Clay	(Spain) María José Sánchez Alayeto	(Portugal) Neuza Silva (Ukraine) Irena Nossenko	6–3, 6–4
Win	4.	15 September 2002	Madrid, Spain	Clay	(Spain) Adriana González Peñas	(Spain) María José Sánchez Alayeto (Spain) María Pilar Sánchez Alayeto	6–3, 6–0
Loss	5.	22 September 2002	Barcelona, Spain	Clay	(Spain) Adriana González Peñas	(Portugal) Frederica Piedade (Czech Republic) Iveta Gerlová	4–6, 4–6
Win	6.	2 March 2003	Grand Canary, Spain	Clay	(Spain) María José Sánchez Alayeto	(Spain) Lourdes Domínguez Lino (Spain) Mariam Ramon Climent	2–6, 7–5, 6–3
Loss	7.	13 July 2003	Getxo, Spain	Clay	(Spain) Adriana González Peñas	(Spain) Sabina Mediano-Alvarez (Spain) Gabriela Velasco Andreu	w/o
Win	8.	10 August 2003	Vigo, Spain	Hard	(Spain) María Pilar Sánchez Alayeto	(Russia) Raissa Gourevitch (Uzbekistan) Ivanna Israilova	w/o
Win	9.	26 October 2003	Seville, Spain	Clay	(Spain) Adriana González Peñas	(Spain) Katia Sabate-Orera (Spain) Nuria Sánchez García	5–7, 6–3, 6–1
Win	10.	23 November 2003	Barcelona, Spain	Clay	(Spain) Adriana González Peñas	(Spain) Núria Roig (Ukraine) Julia Vakulenko	6–3, 6–3
Win	11.	3 May 2004	Tortosa, Spain	Clay	(Spain) Nuria Sánchez García	(Spain) Katia Sabate-Orera (Spain) Estrella Cabeza Candela	4–6, 6–4, 6–4
Loss	12.	6 September 2004	Madrid, Spain	Hard	(France) Kildine Chevalier	(Sweden) Hanna Nooni (Finland) Emma Laine	3–6, 6–7^{(3)}
Win	13.	18 February 2006	Mallorca, Spain	Clay	(France) Laura Thorpe	(Spain) Estrella Cabeza Candela (Spain) Núria Roig	6–4, 7–5
Loss	14.	26 March 2006	ITF Sabadell, Spain	Hard	(Spain) María José Martínez Sánchez	(Spain) Estrella Cabeza Candela (Spain) Núria Roig	1–6, 1–6
