= Adriana González-Peñas =

Spanish tennis player (born 1986)

- Country (sports): Spain
- Born: 30 March 1986 (age 39); Olot, Spain
- Turned pro: 2001
- Plays: Right-handed (two-handed backhand)
- Prize money: $26,618

Singles
- Career record: 81–43
- Career titles: 4 ITF
- Highest ranking: No. 328 (3 November 2003)

Doubles
- Career record: 57–22
- Career titles: 9 ITF
- Highest ranking: No. 313 (7 November 2005)

Adriana González-Peñas (30 March 1986) is a Spanish former professional tennis player.

González-Peñas was French Open girls’ doubles champions 2003 with her compatriot Marta Fraga.

As a professional, her career-high WTA rankings are 328 in singles and 313 in doubles. In her career, González-Peñas won four singles and nine doubles titles on the ITF Women's Circuit.

== ITF finals ==
Legend
$100,000 tournaments
$75,000 tournaments
$50,000 tournaments
$25,000 tournaments
$10,000 tournaments

=== Singles: 9 (4–5) ===
| Result | No. | Date | Tournament | Surface | Opponent | Score |
|---|---|---|---|---|---|---|
| Loss | 1. | 25 November 2001 | Mallorca, Spain | Clay | (Spain) Marta Fraga | 6–0, 2–6, 3–6 |
| Win | 1. | 11 May 2003 | Tortosa, Spain | Clay | (Spain) Marta Fraga | 6–2, 4–6, 6–3 |
| Loss | 2. | 13 July 2003 | Getxo, Spain | Clay | (Spain) Marta Fraga | w/o |
| Loss | 3. | 10 August 2003 | Vigo, Spain | Hard | (Spain) Astrid Waernes García | 3–6, 1–6 |
| Win | 2. | 31 August 2003 | Coimbra, Portugal | Hard | (Spain) Marta Fraga | 6–4, 6–3 |
| Win | 3. | 21 September 2003 | Lleida, Spain | Clay | (France) Amandine Singla | 6–4, 6–2 |
| Loss | 4. | 26 October 2003 | Seville, Spain | Clay | (Spain) Laura Pous Tió | 2–6, 6–3, 3–6 |
| Loss | 5. | 19 September 2004 | Lleida, Spain | Clay | (Italy) Elisa Villa | 6–1, 1–6, 1–6 |
| Win | 4. | 8 May 2005 | Tortosa, Spain | Clay | (Spain) Anna Font Estrada | 4–6, 6–3, 6–0 |

=== Doubles: 12 (9–3) ===
| Result | No. | Date | Tournament | Surface | Partner | Opponents | Score |
|---|---|---|---|---|---|---|---|
| Loss | 1. | 12 May 2002 | Tortosa, Spain | Clay | (Spain) Gabriela Velasco Andreu | (Spain) Marta Fraga (Spain) María José Sánchez Alayeto | 5–7, 1–6 |
| Win | 1. | 15 September 2002 | Madrid, Spain | Clay | (Spain) Marta Fraga | (Spain) María José Sánchez Alayeto (Spain) María Pilar Sánchez Alayeto | 6–3, 6–0 |
| Win | 2. | 27 October 2002 | Seville, Spain | Clay | (Spain) María José Sánchez Alayeto | (Germany) Isabel Collischonn (Germany) Jacqueline Fröhlich | 6–1, 6–2 |
| Loss | 2. | 13 July 2003 | Getxo, Spain | Clay | (Spain) Marta Fraga | (Spain) Sabina Mediano-Alvarez (Spain) Gabriela Velasco Andreu | w/o |
| Win | 3. | 7 September 2003 | Mollerusa, Spain | Hard | (Spain) Nuria Sánchez García | (Spain) Katia Sabate-Orera (Spain) Lourdes Pascual-Rodriguez | 6–3, 6–0 |
| Win | 4. | 26 October 2003 | Seville, Spain | Clay | (Spain) Marta Fraga | (Spain) Katia Sabate-Orera (Spain) Nuria Sánchez García | 5–7, 6–3, 6–1 |
| Win | 5. | 23 November 2003 | Barcelona, Spain | Clay | (Spain) Marta Fraga | (Spain) Núria Roig (Ukraine) Julia Vakulenko | 6–3, 6–3 |
| Win | 6. | 1 November 2004 | Mallorca, Spain | Clay | (Spain) Estrella Cabeza Candela | (Denmark) Hanne Skak Jensen (Denmark) Karina Jacobsgaard | 6–3, 6–3 |
| Win | 7. | 8 February 2005 | Mallorca, Spain | Clay | (Switzerland) Romina Oprandi | (Poland) Olga Brózda (Austria) Tina Schiechtl | 6–3, 7–5 |
| Loss | 3. | 15 February 2005 | Mallorca, Spain | Clay | (Switzerland) Romina Oprandi | (Poland) Olga Brózda (Czech Republic) Petra Cetkovská | 3–6, 4–6 |
| Win | 8. | 3 April 2005 | Rome, Italy | Clay | (Switzerland) Romina Oprandi | (Germany) Gréta Arn (Czech Republic) Janette Bejlkova | 6–3, 6–3 |
| Win | 9. | 8 May 2005 | Tortosa, Spain | Clay | (France) Claire de Gubernatis | (Spain) Anna Font Estrada (Spain) Lourdes Pascual-Rodriguez | w/o |
