= Stella Menna =

Italian tennis player

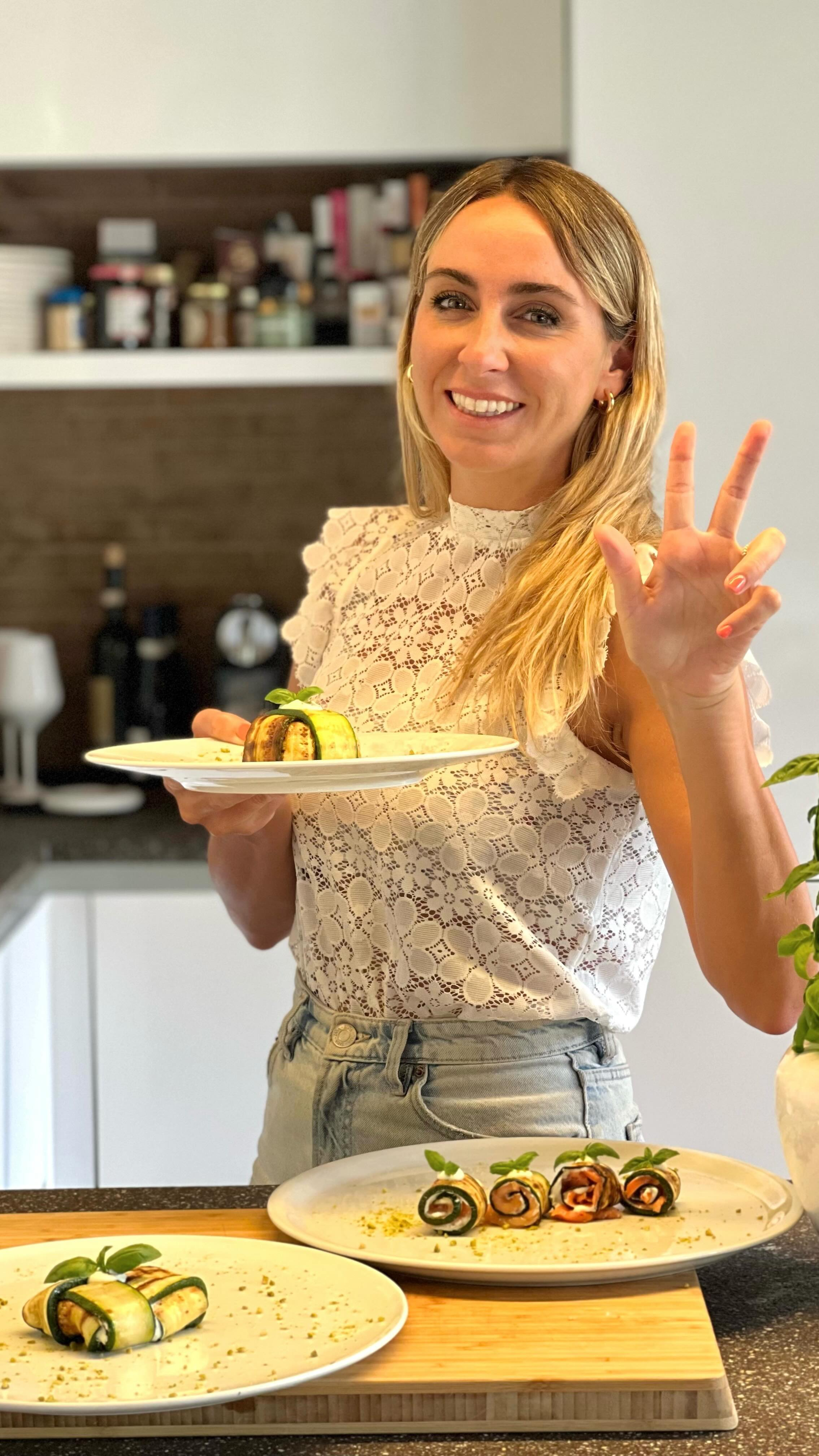
- Country (sports): Italy
- Born: 18 February 1988 (age 37)
- Plays: Right-handed
- Prize money: $26,707

Singles
- Career record: 61–72
- Career titles: 1 ITF
- Highest ranking: No. 336 (19 March 2007)

Doubles
- Career record: 21–32
- Career titles: 1 ITF
- Highest ranking: No. 435 (1 October 2007)

Stella Menna (born 18 February 1988) is an Italian former professional tennis player and an Italian food blogger known as UnaStellaInCucina.

Menna, a right-handed player from Rome, featured in the junior draws at the 2005 Australian Open.

On the professional tour, Menna reached a career-high singles ranking of 336. In 2007, she made her WTA Tour main-draw debut in the women's doubles of the 2007 Italian Open and featured in her only other main draw a week later at the 2007 İstanbul Cup, also in doubles.

== ITF finals ==
Legend
$25,000 tournaments
$10,000 tournaments

=== Singles (1–4) ===
| Result | No. | Date | Location | Surface | Opponent | Score |
|---|---|---|---|---|---|---|
| Loss | 1. | 27 November 2005 | Giza, Egypt | Clay | (Netherlands) Leonie Mekel | 6–2, 3–6, 6–7^{(1)} |
| Loss | 2. | 19 February 2006 | Mallorca, Spain | Clay | (Spain) Estrella Cabeza Candela | 4–6, 1–6 |
| Loss | 3. | 26 March 2006 | Al Mansoura, Egypt | Clay | (Romania) Corina Corduneanu | 1–6, 6–7^{(2)} |
| Loss | 4. | 22 October 2006 | Victoria, Mexico | Hard | (Italy) Jorgelina Cravero | 2–6, 1–6 |
| Win | 1. | 11 March 2007 | Toluca, Mexico | Hard | (Colombia) Mariana Duque Mariño | 6–1, 7–5 |

=== Doubles (1–2) ===
| Result | No. | Date | Tournament | Surface | Partner | Opponents | Score |
|---|---|---|---|---|---|---|---|
| Loss | 1. | 24 July 2005 | ITF Ancona, Italy | Clay | (Italy) Eleonora Iannozzi | (Slovenia) Aleša Bagola (Slovenia) Tina Obrez | 1–6, 0–6 |
| Loss | 2. | 11 February 2006 | ITF Mallorca, Spain | Clay | (Italy) Eleonora Iannozzi | (Spain) Núria Roig (Spain) Estrella Cabeza Candela | 6–3, 3–6, 1–6 |
| Win | 1. | 23 September 2007 | Open de Limoges, France | Hard (i) | (Italy) Bibiane Schoofs | (France) Adeline Goncalves (France) Gracia Radovanovic | 6–4, 6–1 |
