= Núria Roig =

Spanish tennis player (born 1984)

- Full name: Núria Roig-Tost
- Country (sports): Spain
- Born: 19 April 1984 (age 41); Reus, Spain
- Plays: Right-handed (two-handed backhand)
- Prize money: $31,744

Singles
- Career record: 93–88
- Career titles: 1 ITF
- Highest ranking: No. 292 (4 October 2004)

Doubles
- Career record: 52–46
- Career titles: 6 ITF
- Highest ranking: No. 322 (9 May 2005)

Núria Roig-Tost (born 19 April 1984) is a Spanish former professional tennis player.

A right-handed player from Reus, Roig reached a best singles ranking on the professional tour of 292 in the world. She played mostly on the ITF Circuit, where she won a total of seven titles, one in singles and six in doubles. Her only WTA Tour main draw appearance came at the 2005 Copa Colsanitas, where she partnered Laura Pous Tió in the doubles event.

== ITF finals ==
$25,000 tournaments
$10,000 tournaments

=== Singles (1–4) ===
Result	No.	Date	Location	Surface	Opponent	Score
Loss	1.	28 February 2004	Gran Canaria, Spain	Clay	(Spain) Laura Pous Tió	7–5, 2–6, 6–7^{(3–7)}
Loss	2.	28 March 2004	Elda, Spain	Clay	(Italy) Romina Oprandi	2–6, 3–6
Loss	3.	23 May 2004	Santa Cruz de Tenerife, Spain	Hard	(Spain) Marta Fraga	5–7, 2–6
Loss	4.	18 September 2005	Lleida, Spain	Clay	(Russia) Elena Chalova	2–6, 6–3, 6–7^{(1–7)}
Win	1.	13 November 2005	Mallorca, Spain	Clay	(Spain) Estrella Cabeza Candela	6–3, 6–3

=== Doubles (6–5) ===
Result	No.	Date	Location	Surface	Partner	Opponents	Score
Win	1.	9 September 2001	Mollerussa, Spain	Hard	(Bosnia and Herzegovina) Helena Bešović	(Spain) María José Sánchez Alayeto (Spain) María Pilar Sánchez Alayeto	7–6^{(7–2)}, 6–3
Loss	1.	8 September 2002	Mollerussa, Spain	Hard	(Spain) Laura Vallverdu-Zaira	(France) Kildine Chevalier (Germany) Caroline-Ann Basu	3–6, 6–3, 6–7^{(5–7)}
Loss	2.	23 November 2003	Barcelona, Spain	Clay	(Ukraine) Julia Vakulenko	(Spain) Marta Fraga (Spain) Adriana González Peñas	3–6, 3–6
Loss	3.	19 March 2005	Fuerteventura, Spain	Carpet	(Spain) Astrid Waernes	(Germany) Annette Kolb (Germany) Laura Zelder	2–6, 6–4, 1–6
Loss	4.	30 April 2005	Torrent, Spain	Clay	(Spain) Gabriela Velasco Andreu	(Italy) Sara Errani (Spain) Paula García	7–6^{(7–5)}, 4–6, 2–6
Win	2.	8 July 2005	Getxo, Spain	Clay	(Spain) Estrella Cabeza Candela	(Spain) Anna Gil Mares (United Kingdom) Tara Wigan	6–1, 6–0
Winner	3.	3 September 2005	Mollerusa, Spain	Hard	(Brazil) Larissa Carvalho	(Spain) Anna Boada-Plade Llorens (Spain) Rebeca Bou Nogueiro	6–0, 6–1
Win	4.	17 September 2005	Lleida, Spain	Clay	(Spain) Anna Font	(United States) Marlene Ryan (United States) Melissa Ryan	6–2, 6–2
Win	5.	11 February 2006	Mallorca, Spain	Clay	(Spain) Estrella Cabeza Candela	(Italy) Eleonora Iannozzi (Italy) Stella Menna	3–6, 6–3, 6–1
Loss	5.	18 February 2006	Mallorca, Spain	Clay	(Spain) Estrella Cabeza Candela	(Spain) Marta Fraga (France) Laura Thorpe	4–6, 5–7
Win	6.	25 March 2006	Sabadell, Spain	Clay	(Spain) Estrella Cabeza Candela	(Spain) Marta Fraga (Spain) María José Martínez Sánchez	6–1, 6–1
