= Nuria Sánchez García =

Spanish tennis player (born 1987)

- Country (sports): Spain
- Born: 30 March 1987 (age 38)
- Retired: 2008
- Plays: Right-handed
- Prize money: $18,234

Singles
- Career record: 53–48
- Career titles: 1 ITF
- Highest ranking: No. 450 (19 March 2007)

Doubles
- Career record: 42–18
- Career titles: 8 ITF
- Highest ranking: No. 257 (2 April 2007)

Nuria Sánchez García (born 30 March 1987) is a Spanish former professional tennis player.

Sánchez García has career-high WTA rankings of 450 in singles, achieved on 19 March 2007, and 257 in doubles, set on 2 April 2007. She won one singles title and eight doubles titles on the ITF Women's Circuit. Her only WTA Tour main-draw appearance came at the 2007 Barcelona KIA, where she partnered Neuza Silva in the doubles event.

== ITF finals ==
$25,000 tournaments
$10,000 tournaments

=== Singles (1 title, 1 runner–up) ===
Result	W–L	Date	Tournament	Tier	Surface	Opponent	Score
Win	1–0	May 2006	ITF Vic, Spain	10,000	Clay	(France) Olivia Sanchez	6–2, 7–6^{(8)}
Loss	1–1	June 2006	ITF Tortosa, Spain	10,000	Clay	(Spain) Maite Gabarrús-Alonso	6–7^{(5)}, 2–6

=== Doubles (8 titles, 2 runner–ups) ===
Result	W–L	Date	Tournament	Tier	Surface	Partnering	Opponents	Score
Win	1–0	Sep 2003	ITF Mollerusa, Spain	10,000	Hard	(Spain) Adriana González-Peñas	(Spain) Katia Sabate-Orera (Spain) Lourdes Pascual-Rodriguez	6–3, 6–0
Loss	1–1	Oct 2003	ITF Seville, Spain	10,000	Clay	(Spain) Katia Sabate-Orera	(Spain) Marta Fraga (Spain) Adriana González-Peñas	7–5, 3–6, 1–6
Win	2–1	May 2004	ITF Tortosa, Spain	10,000	Clay	(Spain) Marta Fraga	(Spain) Katia Sabate-Orera (Spain) Estrella Cabeza Candela	4–6, 6–4, 6–4
Win	3–1	May 2006	ITF Vic, Spain	10,000	Clay	(Venezuela) Laura Vallvaerdu-Zafra	(Spain) Mariona Gallifa Puigdesens (Spain) Sara Pujals Perez	6–2, 6–3
Loss	3–2	Jun 2006	ITF Les Franqueses del Vallès, Spain	10,000	Hard	(Spain) Astrid Waernes García	(India) Sandhya Nagaraj (Spain) Sheila Solsona Carcasona	2–6, 3–6
Win	4–2	Oct 2006	ITF Benicarló, Spain	10,000	Clay	(Italy) Verdiana Verardi	(Ukraine) Veronika Kapshay (Spain) Gabriela Velasco Andreu	6–4, 6–3
Win	5–2	Oct 2006	ITF Sant Cugat del Vallès, Spain	25,000	Clay	(Spain) Beatriz García Vidagany	(Spain) Cristina Sánchez-Quintanar (Spain) Francisca Sintès Martín	3–6, 6–3, 6–3
Win	6–2	Nov 2006	ITF Mallorca, Spain	10,000	Clay	(Portugal) Neuza Silva	(Slovenia) Anja Prislan (Germany) Laura Siegemund	6–3, 6–1
Win	7–2	Mar 2007	ITF Sant Boi, Spain	10,000	Clay	(Spain) Irene Rehberger Bescos	(Italy) Nicole Clerico (Kyrgyzstan) Ksenia Palkina	4–6, 6–3, 6–4
Win	8–2	Mar 2007	ITF Sabadell, Spain	10,000	Clay	(Italy) Verdiana Verardi	(Italy) Nicole Clerico (France) Violette Huck	6–3, 7–6^{(5)}
