= Mariona Gallifa Puigdesens =

Spanish tennis player (born 1982)

- Country (sports): Spain
- Born: 28 January 1982 (age 43)
- Plays: Right-handed
- Prize money: $18,476

Singles
- Career record: 64–97
- Highest ranking: No. 399 (21 Oct 2002)

Doubles
- Career record: 19–24
- Highest ranking: No. 596 (14 Oct 2002)

Mariona Gallifa Puigdesens (born 28 January 1982) is a Spanish former professional tennis player.

Gallifa Puigdesens, who had a best ranking of 399 in the world, qualified for her only WTA Tour main draw at the 2002 Tashkent Open, where she was beaten in the first round by second seed Tatiana Poutchek.

== ITF finals ==
=== Doubles: 2 (0–2) ===
Outcome	No.	Date	Tournament	Surface	Partner	Opponents	Score
Runner-up	1.	16 October 2005	Benicarlo, Spain	Clay	(Spain) Elena Caldes-Marques	(Sweden) Sofia Brun (Austria) Patricia Mayr	5–7, 6–1, 2–6
Runner-up	2.	7 May 2006	Vic, Spain	Clay	(Spain) Sara Pujals Pérez	(Spain) Nuria Sánchez García (Venezuela) Laura Vallvaerdu-Zafra	2–6, 3–6
