= 2011 Open GDF Suez de Marseille =

2011 Open Féminin de Marseille
- Date: June 6 – June 12
- Edition: 14th
- Location: Marseille, France

Champions

Singles
- (France) Pauline Parmentier

Doubles
- (Romania) Irina-Camelia Begu / (Russia) Nina Bratchikova
← 2010 ·	Open Féminin de Marseille	· 2012 →

The 2011 Open GDF Suez de Marseille is a professional tennis tournament played on outdoor clay courts. It is part of the 2011 ITF Women's Circuit. It takes place in Marseille, France June 6–12, 2011.

== WTA entrants ==
=== Seeds ===
Nationality	Player	Ranking*	Seeding
RUS	Anastasia Pivovarova	93	1
BLR	Anastasiya Yakimova	100	2
ROU	Irina-Camelia Begu	102	3
FRA	Pauline Parmentier	105	4
ESP	Carla Suárez Navarro	126	5
AUS	Sophie Ferguson	134	6
ITA	Corinna Dentoni	146	7
LUX	Mandy Minella	147	8

- Rankings are as of May 23, 2011.

=== Other entrants ===
The following players received wildcards into the singles main draw:

- (France) Estelle Cascino
- (France) Julie Coin
- (France) Victoria Larrière
- (France) Elixane Lechemia

The following players received entry from the qualifying draw:

- (Croatia) Dijana Banoveć
- (Spain) Eva Fernández-Brugués
- (Spain) Inés Ferrer-Suárez
- (Croatia) Tereza Mrdeža

The following players received entry by a lucky loser:

- (Romania) Laura-Ioana Andrei

== Champions ==
=== Singles ===
(France) Pauline Parmentier def. (Romania) Irina-Camelia Begu, 6–3, 6–2

=== Doubles ===
(Romania) Irina-Camelia Begu / (Russia) Nina Bratchikova def. (Romania) Laura-Ioana Andrei / (Romania) Mădălina Gojnea, 6–2, 6–2
