= 2002 Tashkent Open =

- Date: 10–16 June
- Edition: 4th
- Category: Tier IV
- Draw: 32S / 16D
- Prize money: $140,000
- Surface: Hard / outdoor
- Location: Tashkent, Uzbekistan
- Venue: Tashkent Tennis Center

Champions

Singles
- (Switzerland) Marie-Gayanay Mikaelian

Doubles
- (Ukraine) Tatiana Perebiynis (Belarus) Tatiana Poutchek
- Tashkent Open

The 2002 Tashkent Open was a women's tennis tournament played on hard courts at the Tashkent Tennis Center in Tashkent, Uzbekistan that was part of the Tier IV category of the 2002 WTA Tour. It was the fourth edition of the tournament and was held from 10 June through 16 June 2002. First-seeded Marie-Gayanay Mikaelian won the singles title and earned $22,000 first-prize money.

== Finals ==
=== Singles ===
(Switzerland) Marie-Gayanay Mikaelian defeated (Belarus) Tatiana Poutchek, 6–4, 6–4

- It was Mikaelian's only WTA singles title of her career

=== Doubles ===
(Ukraine) Tatiana Perebiynis / (Belarus) Tatiana Poutchek defeated (Germany) Mia Buric / (Russia) Galina Fokina, 7–5, 6–2
