= 2016 Open Féminin de Marseille =

- Date: 31 May – 5 June
- Edition: 19th
- Category: ITF Women's Circuit
- Prize money: $100,000
- Surface: Clay
- Location: Marseille, France

Champions

Singles
- (Montenegro) Danka Kovinić

Doubles
- (Chinese Taipei) Hsieh Su-wei / (United States) Nicole Melichar
- Open Féminin de Marseille

The 2016 Open Féminin de Marseille was a professional tennis tournament played on outdoor clay courts. It was the nineteenth edition of the tournament and part of the 2016 ITF Women's Circuit, offering a total of $100,000 in prize money. It took place in Marseille, France, on 31 May – 5 June 2016.

== Singles main draw entrants ==
=== Seeds ===
Country	Player	Rank^{1}	Seed
MNE	Danka Kovinić	59	1
TPE	Hsieh Su-wei	80	2
ESP	Lara Arruabarrena	92	3
ESP	Lourdes Domínguez Lino	112	4
GRE	Maria Sakkari	114	5
CHN	Han Xinyun	125	6
ESP	Sílvia Soler Espinosa	126	7
ROU	Alexandra Dulgheru	127	8

- ^{1} Rankings as of 23 May 2016.

=== Other entrants ===
The following player received a wildcard into the singles main draw:

- (France) Victoria Larrière
- (France) Victoria Muntean
- (France) Irina Ramialison
- (France) Caroline Roméo

The following players received entry from the qualifying draw:

- (Belgium) Elyne Boeykens
- (United Kingdom) Amanda Carreras
- (Russia) Varvara Flink
- (Venezuela) Andrea Gámiz

The following player received entry by a protected ranking:

- (France) Claire Feuerstein

== Champions ==
=== Singles ===
- (Montenegro) Danka Kovinić def. (Chinese Taipei) Hsieh Su-wei, 6–2, 6–3

=== Doubles ===
- (Chinese Taipei) Hsieh Su-wei / (United States) Nicole Melichar def. (Slovakia) Jana Čepelová / (Spain) Lourdes Domínguez Lino, 1–6, 6–3, [10–3]
