= 2016 Open Féminin de Marseille – Singles =

Singles
- 2016 Open Féminin de Marseille

Final
- Champion: (Montenegro) Danka Kovinić
- Runner-up: (Chinese Taipei) Hsieh Su-wei
- Score: 6–2, 6–3

Events
Singles	Doubles
- Open Féminin de Marseille

Monica Niculescu was the defending champion, but chose not to participate.

Danka Kovinić won the title, defeating Hsieh Su-wei in the final, 6–2, 6–3.

== Seeds ==
1. (Montenegro) Danka Kovinić (champion)
2. (Chinese Taipei) Hsieh Su-wei (final)
3. (Spain) Lara Arruabarrena (semifinals)
4. (Spain) Lourdes Domínguez Lino (semifinals)
5. (Greece) Maria Sakkari (second round)
6. (China) Han Xinyun (quarterfinals)
7. (Spain) Sílvia Soler Espinosa (quarterfinals)
8. (Romania) Alexandra Dulgheru (first round, retired)

== Main draw ==
Key

- Q = Qualifier
- WC = Wild card
- LL = Lucky loser
- Alt = Alternate
- ITF = ITF entry
- PR = Protected ranking
- SR = Special ranking
- SE = Special exempt
- JE = Junior exempt
- JR = Junior Accelerator Programme entrant
- CO = College Accelerator Programme entrant
- NG = Next Gen Accelerator Program entrant
- w/o = Walkover
- r = Retired
- d = Defaulted

=== Finals ===
Semifinals
1	(Montenegro) Danka Kovinić	6	6
4	(Spain) Lourdes Domínguez Lino	1	2
3	(Spain) Lara Arruabarrena	1	6^{5}
2	(Chinese Taipei) Hsieh Su-wei	6	7^{7}

Final
1	(Montenegro) Danka Kovinić	6	6
2	(Chinese Taipei) Hsieh Su-wei	2	3

=== Top half ===
First round
1	(Montenegro) D Kovinić	6	6
WC	(France) C Roméo	1	2
(Spain) MT Torró Flor	6	6
(Slovakia) J Čepelová	4	2
WC	(France) V Muntean	7	4	1
PR	(France) C Feuerstein	5	6	6
(France) F Ferro	4	6	3
8	(Romania) A Dulgheru	6	2	1^{r}
4	(Spain) L Domínguez Lino	1	7	6
(Russia) V Kamenskaya	6	5	3
(Thailand) V Wongteanchai	2	3
(France) A Lim	6	6
(Russia) A Panova	5	3
(Japan) E Hozumi	7	6
Q	(United Kingdom) A Carreras	1	2
7	(Spain) S Soler Espinosa	6	6

Second round
1	(Montenegro) D Kovinić	6	3
(Spain) MT Torró Flor	3	1^{r}
PR	(France) C Feuerstein	4	6	4
(France) F Ferro	6	4	6
4	(Spain) L Domínguez Lino	6	6
(France) A Lim	1	3
(Japan) E Hozumi	2	7^{7}	1
7	(Spain) S Soler Espinosa	6	6^{5}	6

Quarterfinals
1	(Montenegro) D Kovinić	6	6
(France) F Ferro	4	4
4	(Spain) L Domínguez Lino	6	7
7	(Spain) S Soler Espinosa	0	5

Semifinals
1	(Montenegro) D Kovinić	6	6
4	(Spain) L Domínguez Lino	1	2

=== Bottom half ===
First round
6	(China) X Han	7	2	6
WC	(France) V Larrière	5	6	4
(Bulgaria) S Karatantcheva	3	4
(Russia) I Khromacheva	6	6
Q	(Venezuela) A Gámiz	5	2
(Netherlands) R Hogenkamp	7	6
(France) A Hesse	6^{10}	1
3	(Spain) L Arruabarrena	7^{12}	6
5	(Greece) M Sakkari	7	6
Q	(Belgium) E Boeykens	5	4
(Russia) N Vikhlyantseva	5	2
(Japan) M Eguchi	7	6
Q	(Russia) V Flink	1	6	3
(Paraguay) V Cepede Royg	6	2	6
WC	(France) I Ramialison	2	2
2	(Chinese Taipei) S-w Hsieh	6	6

Second round
6	(China) X Han	6	2
(Russia) I Khromacheva	3	0^{r}
(Netherlands) R Hogenkamp	1	0
3	(Spain) L Arruabarrena	6	6
5	(Greece) M Sakkari	5	6^{6}
(Japan) M Eguchi	7	7^{8}
(Paraguay) V Cepede Royg	3	4
2	(Chinese Taipei) S-w Hsieh	6	6

Quarterfinals
6	(China) X Han	6	0	3
3	(Spain) L Arruabarrena	2	6	6
(Japan) M Eguchi	2	6	1
2	(Chinese Taipei) S-w Hsieh	6	3	6

Semifinals
3	(Spain) L Arruabarrena	1	6^{5}
2	(Chinese Taipei) S-w Hsieh	6	7^{7}
