= Mădălina Gojnea =

Romanian tennis player

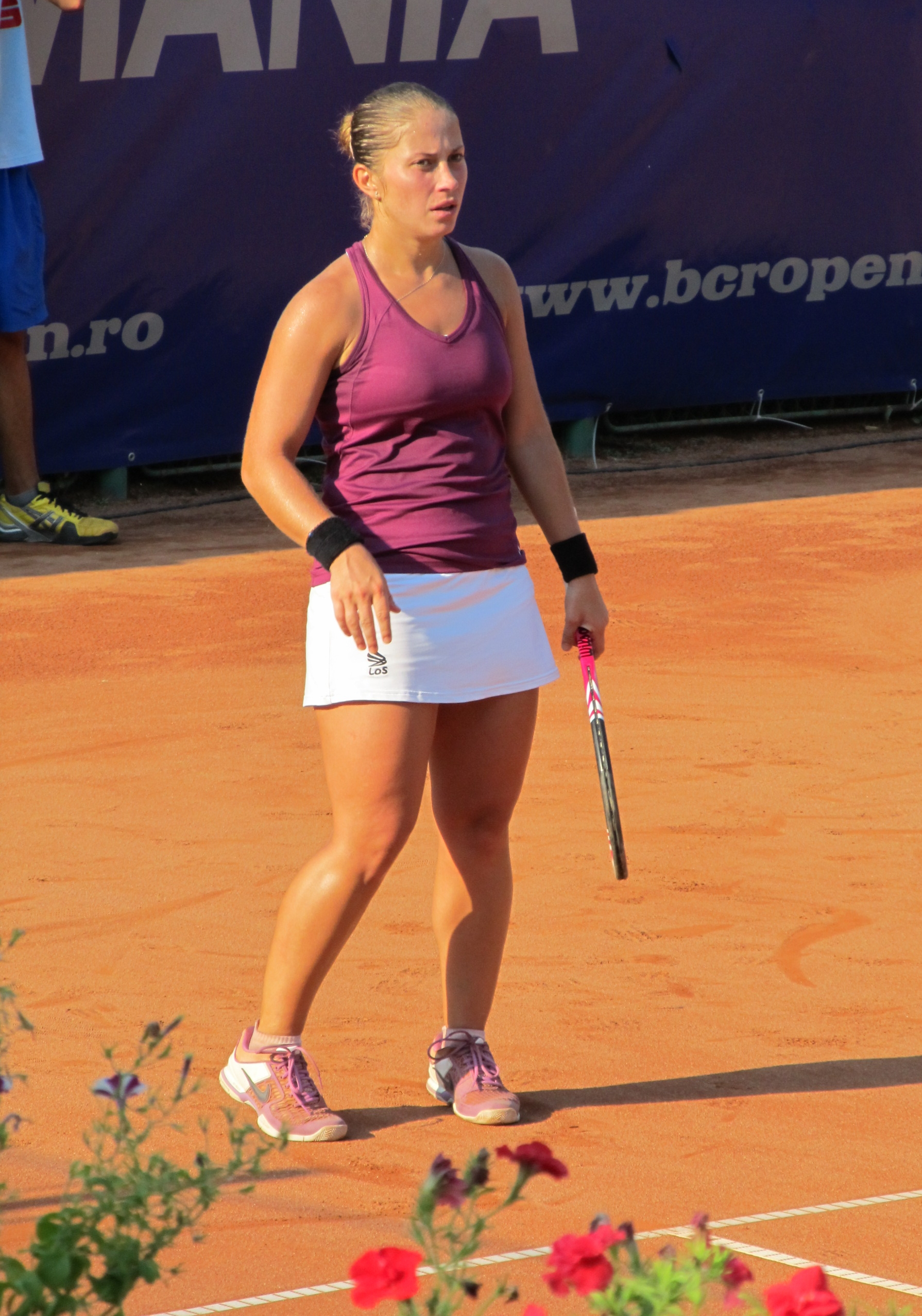
- Gojnea at the 2011 BCR Open Romania Ladies
- Full name: Mădălina-Victorița Gojnea
- Country (sports): Romania
- Residence: Bucharest
- Born: 23 August 1987 (age 38) Ploiești, Socialist Republic of Romania
- Height: 1.63 m (5 ft 4 in)
- Retired: 2013/2015
- Plays: Right-handed (two-handed backhand)
- Prize money: $181,066

Singles
- Career record: 238–114
- Career titles: 12 ITF
- Highest ranking: No. 149 (4 July 2011)

Grand Slam singles results
- Australian Open: Q3 (2011, 2012)
- French Open: Q3 (2012)
- Wimbledon: Q2 (2007)
- US Open: Q1 (2011)

Doubles
- Career record: 104–65
- Career titles: 11 ITF
- Highest ranking: No. 191 (9 July 2007)

Team competitions
- Fed Cup: 8–6

Mădălina-Victorița Gojnea (born 23 August 1987) is a former Romanian tennis player.

On 4 July 2011, she reached her highest WTA singles ranking of 149 whilst her best doubles ranking was 191 on 9 July 2007.

In 2013, at only 25 years old, she announced her retirement due to multiple injuries.

She played for the Romania Fed Cup team in 2006 and 2007 and accumulated a win-loss record of 8–6 (singles: 7–1) in Fed Cup competitions.

In May 2015, after almost two years of absence from the pro circuit, Mădălina made her comeback to playing tennis at the Pamira Open, an ITF event held in Sibiu. Her last match on the circuit took place in August of the same year.

== Junior career ==
=== Junior Grand Slam finals ===
==== Girls' singles ====
Result	Year	Championship	Surface	Opponent	Score
Loss	2004	French Open	Clay	(Bulgaria) Sesil Karatantcheva	4–6, 0–6

==== Girls' doubles ====
Result	Year	Championship	Surface	Partner	Opponents	Score
Loss	2004	US Open	Hard	(Romania) Monica Niculescu	(New Zealand) Marina Erakovic (Netherlands) Michaëlla Krajicek	6–7^{(4)}, 0–6

== Senior career ==
=== ITF finals ===
Legend
$100,000 tournaments
$75,000 tournaments
$50,000 tournaments
$25,000 tournaments
$10,000 tournaments

==== Singles: 17 (12–5) ====
Result	No.	Date	Tournament	Surface	Opponent	Score
Loss	1.	11 August 2003	ITF Bucharest, Romania	Clay	(Germany) Antonela Voina	5–7, 2–6
Win	2.	27 September 2004	ITF Cluj-Napoca, Romania	Clay	(Ukraine) Oksana Teplyakova	7–5, 6–3
Win	3.	31 January 2005	ITF Vale do Lobo, Portugal	Hard	(Spain) Lucía Jiménez Almendros	6–4, 4–6, 6–0
Win	4.	22 March 2005	ITF Athens, Greece	Clay	(Greece) Anna Gerasimou	6–1, 6–3
Win	5.	28 March 2005	ITF Patras, Greece	Hard	(Romania) Antonia Xenia Tout	7–5, 6–2
Win	6.	25 July 2005	ITF Arad, Romania	Clay	(Russia) Oksana Karyshkova	6–1, 6–3
Loss	7.	2 August 2005	ITF Bucharest, Romania	Clay	(Romania) Raluca Olaru	6–7^{(3)}, 5–7
Loss	8.	11 April 2006	Open de Biarritz, France	Clay	(France) Stéphanie Cohen-Aloro	7–6^{(1)}, 4–6, 4–6
Win	9.	12 June 2006	ITF Gorizia, Italy	Clay	(Czech Republic) Barbora Záhlavová-Strýcová	6–4, 6–1
Win	10.	5 April 2010	ITF Hvar, Croatia	Clay	(Bosnia and Herzegovina) Ema Burgić	6–4, 6–4
Win	11.	19 April 2010	ITF Šibenik, Croatia	Clay	(Switzerland) Conny Perrin	6–2, 6–1
Loss	12.	24 May 2010	ITF Craiova, Romania	Clay	(Romania) Alexandra Cadanțu	7–5, 3–6, 0–6
Win	13.	31 May 2010	ITF Bucharest, Romania	Clay	(Romania) Bianca Hîncu	6–2, 6–2
Win	14.	7 June 2010	ITF Iași, Romania	Clay	(Romania) Ilinca Stoica	6–2, 7–5
Win	15.	11 July 2010	ITF Aschaffenburg, Germany	Clay	(France) Caroline Garcia	6–1, 6–0
Win	16.	26 September 2010	ITF Bucharest, Romania	Clay	(Slovakia) Kristína Kučová	6–4, 6–4
Loss	17.	24 May 2015	ITF Sibiu, Romania	Clay	(Hungary) Anna Bondár	1–6, 6–4, 1–6

==== Doubles: 20 (11–9) ====
Result	No.	Date	Tournament	Surface	Partner	Opponents	Score
Win	1.	18 July 2004	ITF Bucharest, Romania	Clay	(Romania) Monica Niculescu	(Romania) Liana Balaci (United States) Iris Ichim	6–4, 6–1
Win	2.	6 February 2005	ITF Vale do Lobo, Portugal	Hard	(Romania) Gabriela Niculescu	(Ukraine) Irina Buryachok (Russia) Olga Panova	6–3, 6–4
Loss	3.	27 March 2005	ITF Athens, Greece	Clay	(Romania) Lenore Lăzăroiu	(Australia) Lauren Breadmore (France) Aurélie Védy	3–6, 5–7
Win	4.	3 April 2005	ITF Patras, Greece	Hard	(Romania) Lenore Lăzăroiu	(Greece) Asimina Kaplani (Greece) Anna Koumantou	6–3, 6–2
Win	5.	14 May 2005	ITF Bucharest, Romania	Clay	(Romania) Bianca Bonifate	(Greece) Asimina Kaplani (Greece) Anna Koumantou	6–2, 7–6^{(3)}
Win	6.	21 May 2005	ITF Pitești, Romania	Clay	(Romania) Gabriela Niculescu	(Serbia and Montenegro) Vojislava Lukić (Serbia and Montenegro) Andrea Popović	6–4, 6–3
Win	7.	23 July 2005	ITF Bucharest, Romania	Clay	(Romania) Gabriela Niculescu	(Romania) Ágnes Szatmári (Ukraine) Oksana Teplyakova	6–3, 6–2
Loss	8.	9 April 2006	ITF Dinan, France	Clay (i)	(Poland) Agnieszka Radwańska	(Poland) Klaudia Jans (Slovakia) Henrieta Nagyová	6–3, 2–6, 4–6
Loss	9.	23 July 2006	ITF Vittel, France	Clay	(Russia) Ekaterina Makarova	(Ukraine) Yuliya Beygelzimer (Hungary) Ágnes Szávay	2–6, 5–7
Win	10.	17 March 2007	ITF Las Palmas, Spain	Hard	(Romania) Sorana Cîrstea	(United Kingdom) Claire Curran (United Kingdom) Melanie South	4–6, 7–6^{(5)}, 6–4
Loss	11.	11 May 2007	ITF Jounieh, Lebanon	Clay	(Romania) Monica Niculescu	(Belarus) Tatiana Poutchek (Belarus) Anastasiya Yakimova	5–7, 0–6
Loss	12.	29 June 2007	ITF Bucharest, Romania	Clay	(Romania) Laura Ioana Andrei	(Germany) Julia Görges (Serbia) Vojislava Lukić	2–6, 4–6
Win	13.	12 September 2007	ITF Lleida, Spain	Clay	(Poland) Sylwia Zagórska	(Portugal) Catarina Ferreira (Spain) Sheila Solsona-Carcasona	7–6^{(8)}, 6–1
Loss	14.	25 April 2010	ITF Šibenik, Croatia	Clay	(Croatia) Maria Abramović	(Romania) Alexandra Cadanțu (Bulgaria) Dalia Zafirova	2–6, 3–6
Win	15.	23 May 2010	ITF Bucharest, Romania	Clay	(Romania) Laura Ioana Andrei	(Romania) Diana Enache (Romania) Cristina Mitu	6–4, 3–6, [10–7]
Win	16.	4 June 2010	ITF Bucharest, Romania	Clay	(Romania) Laura Ioana Andrei	(Romania) Elora Dabija (Romania) Ioana Gașpar	6–2, 6–4
Win	17.	12 June 2010	ITF Iași, Romania	Clay	(Romania) Ionela-Andreea Iova	(Oman) Fatma Al-Nabhani (Bulgaria) Biljana Pawlowa-Dimitrova	6–3, 6–3
Loss	18.	27 November 2010	Toyota World Challenge, Japan	Carpet (i)	(Romania) Irina-Camelia Begu	(Japan) Shuko Aoyama (Japan) Rika Fujiwara	6–1, 3–6, [9–11]
Loss	19.	11 June 2011	Open de Marseille, France	Clay	(Romania) Laura Ioana Andrei	(Romania) Irina-Camelia Begu (Russia) Nina Bratchikova	2–6, 2–6
Loss	20.	17 June 2011	Open de Montpellier, France	Clay	(Spain) Inés Ferrer Suárez	(Brazil) Paula Cristina Gonçalves (Ukraine) Maryna Zanevska	4–6, 5–7

=== Mixed doubles ===
Current through the 2026 Wimbledon Championships.

Tournament	2005	2006	2007	2008	2009	2010	2011	2012	2013	2014	2015	2016	2017	2018	2019	2020	2021	2022	2023	2024	2025	2026	SR	W–L	Win %
Grand Slam tournaments
Australian Open	A																						0 / 0	0–0	–
French Open	A																						0 / 0	0–0	–
Wimbledon	A															NH	A						0 / 0	0–0	–
US Open	A															NH	A						0 / 0	0–0	–
Win–loss	0–0	0–0	0–0	0–0	0–0	0–0	0–0	0–0	0–0	0–0	0–0	0–0	0–0	0–0	0–0	0–0	0–0	0–0	0–0	0–0	0–0	0–0	0 / 0	0–0	–
National representation
Olympic Games	NH			A	NH			A	NH			A	NH			A (Note: The 2020 Summer Olympics were held in 2021 because of the COVID-19 pandemic.)		NH		A	NH		0 / 0	0–0	–
Career total	0–0	0–0	0–0	0–0	0–0	0–0	0–0	0–0	0–0	0–0	0–0	0–0	0–0	0–0	0–0	0–0	0–0	0–0	0–0	0–0	0–0	0–0	0 / 0	0–0	–
