= Estrella Cabeza Candela =

Spanish tennis player (born 1987)

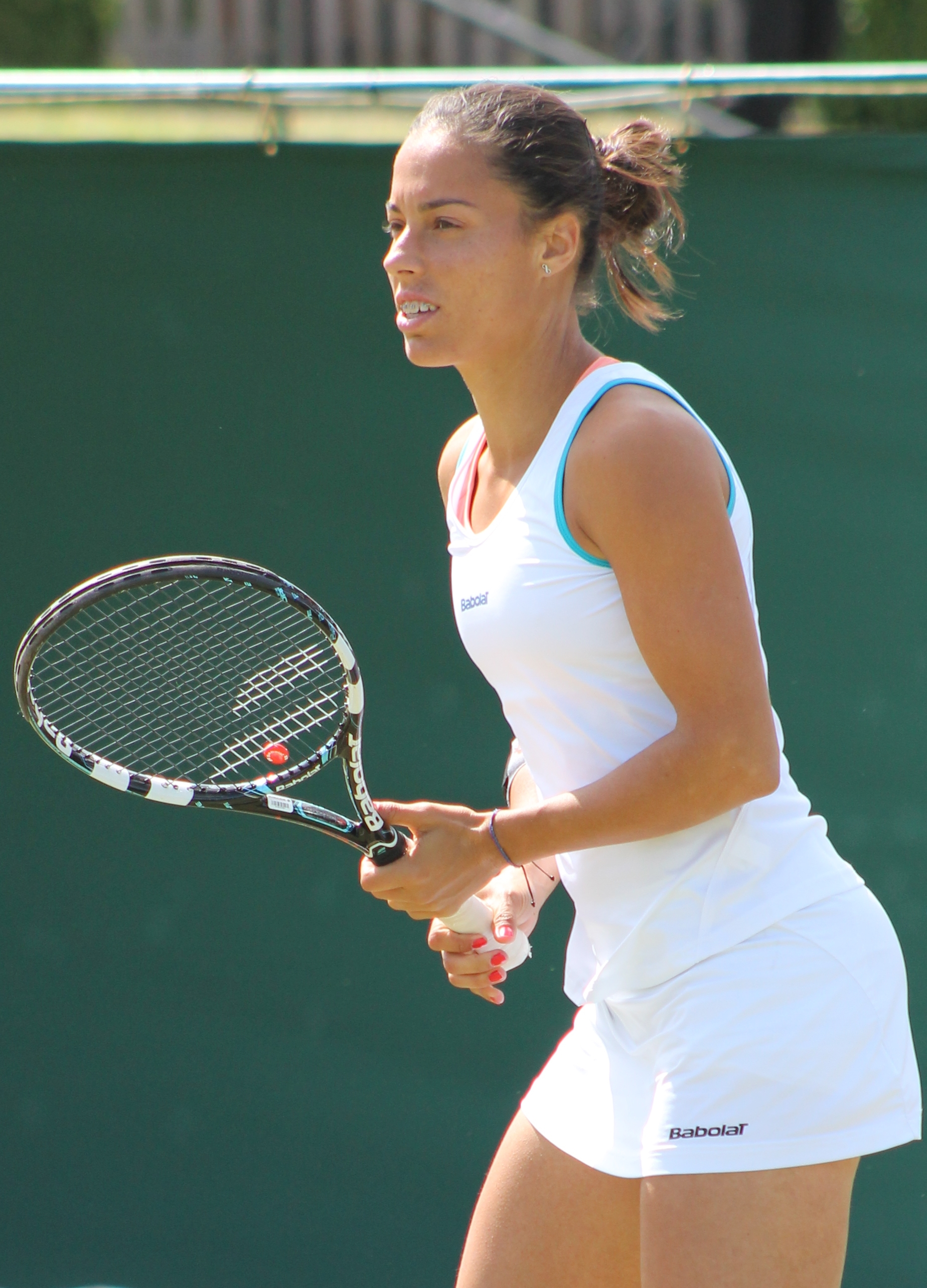
- Cabeza Candela in Wimbledon, 2014
- Country (sports): Spain
- Residence: Barcelona, Spain
- Born: 20 February 1987 (age 39) Los Palacios y Villafranca, Spain
- Height: 1.73 m (5 ft 8 in)
- Retired: 2020
- Plays: Right (two-handed backhand)
- Prize money: $507,109

Singles
- Career record: 469–303
- Career titles: 13 ITF
- Highest ranking: No. 95 (13 May 2013)

Grand Slam singles results
- Australian Open: Q3 (2013)
- French Open: 1R (2014)
- Wimbledon: 1R (2013)
- US Open: 1R (2013)

Doubles
- Career record: 175–135
- Career titles: 16 ITF
- Highest ranking: No. 176 (2 April 2012)

Estrella Cabeza Candela (Spanish pronunciation: [esˈtɾeʎa kaˈβeθa kanˈdela]; born 20 February 1987) is a Spanish former tennis player.

During her career, Cabeza Candela won 13 singles and 16 doubles titles on the ITF Women's Circuit. On 13 May 2013, she reached her best singles ranking of world No. 95. On 2 April 2012, she peaked at No. 176 in the doubles rankings.

== Personal life ==
Cabeza Candela was born in Los Palacios y Villafranca to Manuel Cabeza (tennis coach) and Estrella Candela, sister is Ana (training to be an aeronautic engineer). She began playing tennis at age four with her father and sister, and started playing seriously aged seven. Her tennis idol was Monica Seles, and her favorite surface was clay.

== Career ==
Coached by Gonzalo Lopez and Martin Vilar, Cabeza Candela had a breakout year in 2013. She broke into the top 100 for the first time at age 26, by reaching No. 95 on 13 May 2013.

Later that summer, she played her first major main draw at Wimbledon, and lost in the first round to Caroline Wozniacki, 0–6, 2–6. In early July, Cabeza Candela reached her best result in a WTA Tour tournament by reaching the semifinals at Palermo, losing to Roberta Vinci, in three sets, and later semifinals at 2014 Hobart International, losing to Garbiñe Muguruza.

She announced her retirement from professional tennis ın 2020.

== ITF Circuit finals ==
=== Singles: 29 (13 titles, 16 runner-ups) ===
Legend $75,000 tournaments $50,000 tournaments $25,000 tournaments $10/15,000 tournaments	Finals by surface Hard (5–4) Clay (8–12)

Result	No.	Date	Tournament	Tier	Surface	Opponent	Score
Loss	1.	Aug 2004	ITF Pontevedra, Spain	10,000	Hard	(Spain) Lucía Jiménez Almendros	7–6^{(3)}, 6–7^{(4)}, 6–7^{(2)}
Win	1.	Jun 2005	ITF Les Franqueses del Vallès, Spain	10,000	Hard	(Germany) Justine Ozga	7–6^{(3)}, 4–6, 6–2
Loss	2.	Nov 2005	ITF Mallorca, Spain	10,000	Clay	(Spain) Núria Roig	3–6, 3–6
Win	2.	Feb 2006	ITF Mallorca, Spain	10,000	Clay	(Italy) Stella Menna	6–4, 6–1
Win	3.	Mar 2006	ITF Sabadell, Spain	10,000	Clay	(Spain) María José Martínez Sánchez	6–3, 7–5
Win	4.	Jul 2006	ITF Valladolid, Spain	25,000	Hard	(Australia) Monique Adamczak	2–6, 7–6^{(3)}, 7–5
Loss	3.	Jun 2008	ITF Galatina, Italy	25,000	Clay	(Latvia) Anastasija Sevastova	4–6, 4–6
Win	5.	Jun 2008	ITF Getxo, Spain	25,000	Clay	(Netherlands) Chayenne Ewijk	6–4, 6–4
Win	6.	Jul 2008	ITF Valladolid, Spain	25,000	Hard	(Portugal) Frederica Piedade	6–4, 7–6^{(4)}
Loss	4.	Sep 2008	ITF Madrid, Spain	25,000	Hard	(Germany) Angelique Kerber	1–6, 3–6
Loss	5.	Sep 2008	ITF Granada, Spain	25,000	Hard	(Russia) Regina Kulikova	3–6, 4–6
Loss	6.	Jul 2009	ITF Rome, Italy	25,000	Clay	(Spain) Eloisa Compostizo de Andrés	3–6, 7–6^{(2)}, 2–6
Loss	7.	Jul 2009	ITF Valladolid, Spain	25,000	Hard	(Canada) Heidi El Tabakh	2–6, 6–3, 3–6
Win	7.	Sep 2010	ITF Mollerusa, Spain	10,000	Hard	(Ukraine) Yevgeniya Kryvoruchko	6–2, 6–4
Win	8.	Mar 2011	ITF Madrid, Spain	10,000	Clay	(Romania) Laura-Ioana Andrei	6–3, 6–2
Loss	8.	Oct 2011	ITF Seville, Spain	25,000	Clay	(Hungary) Réka Luca Jani	6–2, 3–6, 3–6
Loss	9.	Sep 2012	Save Cup, Italy	50,000	Clay	(Italy) Karin Knapp	1–6, 6–3, 1–6
Loss	10.	Sep 2012	Open de Saint-Malo, France	25,000	Clay	(Ukraine) Maryna Zanevska	2–6, 7–6^{(5)}, 0–6
Loss	11.	Oct 2012	ITF Sant Cugat del Vallès, Spain	25,000	Clay	(Spain) María Teresa Torró Flor	1–6, 4–6
Loss	12.	Oct 2012	ITF Seville, Spain	25,000	Clay	(Brazil) Teliana Pereira	6–4, 6–7^{(3)}, 6–7^{(5)}
Loss	13.	Mar 2013	ITF Osprey, United States	50,000	Clay	(Colombia) Mariana Duque Mariño	6–7^{(2)}, 1–6
Loss	14.	Jun 2015	ITF Madrid, Spain	10,000	Clay	(Spain) Olga Sáez Larra	4–6, 0–6
Win	9.	Oct 2015	ITF La Vall d'Uixó, Spain	10,000	Clay	(Ukraine) Oleksandra Korashvili	7–6^{(5)}, 6–2
Win	10.	Oct 2015	ITF Melilla, Spain	10,000	Hard	(Spain) María José Luque Moreno	6–3, 6–4
Win	11.	Nov 2015	ITF Vinaròs, Spain	10,000	Clay	(Spain) Noelia Bouzó Zanotti	6–2, 6–2
Win	12.	Apr 2017	ITF Hammamet, Tunisia	15,000	Clay	(Chile) Fernanda Brito	6–3, 7–5
Loss	15.	May 2017	Solgironès Open, Spain	25,000	Clay	(Spain) Georgina García Pérez	2–6, 6–0, 4–6
Loss	16.	Dec 2017	ITF Castellón, Spain	15,000	Clay	(Georgia (country)) Ekaterine Gorgodze	0–6, 6–3, 1–6
Win	13.	Jun 2018	ITF Barcelona, Spain	25,000	Clay	(Spain) Aliona Bolsova	6–2, 6–3

=== Doubles: 30 (16 titles, 14 runner-ups) ===
Result	No.	Date	Tournament	Tier	Surface	Partner	Opponents	Score
Loss	1.	May 2004	ITF Tortosa, Spain	10,000	Clay	(Spain) Katia Sabate-Orera	(Spain) Marta Fraga (Spain) Nuria Sánchez García	6–4, 4–6, 4–6
Win	1.	Nov 2004	ITF Mallorca, Spain	10,000	Clay	(Spain) Adriana González-Peñas	(Denmark) Hanne Skak Jensen (Denmark) Karina Jacobsgaard	6–3, 6–3
Win	2.	Jul 2005	ITF Getxo, Spain	10,000	Clay	(Spain) Núria Roig	(Spain) Anna Gil Mares (United Kingdom) Tara Wigan	6–1, 6–0
Loss	2.	Aug 2005	ITF Vigo, Spain	10,000	Hard	(Spain) Matilde Muñoz Gonzalves	(Spain) Anna Font (Spain) María José Martínez Sánchez	2–6, 3–6
Win	3.	Feb 2006	ITF Mallorca, Spain	10,000	Clay	(Spain) Núria Roig	(Italy) Eleonora Iannozzi (Italy) Stella Menna	3–6, 6–3, 6–1
Loss	3.	Feb 2006	ITF Mallorca, Spain	10,000	Clay	(Spain) Núria Roig	(Spain) Marta Fraga (France) Laura Thorpe	4–6, 5–7
Win	4.	Mar 2006	ITF Sabadell, Spain	10,000	Clay	(Spain) Núria Roig	(Spain) Marta Fraga (Spain) María José Martínez Sánchez	6–1, 6–1
Loss	4.	May 2006	ITF Tenerife, Spain	25,000	Hard	(Venezuela) Laura Vallvaerdu-Zafra	(Australia) Monique Adamczak (Germany) Annette Kolb	6–4, 4–6, 1–6
Win	5.	May 2007	ITF Monzón, Spain	75,000	Hard	(Argentina) María Emilia Salerni	(France) Iryna Brémond (Serbia) Vesna Dolonc	6–2, 6–1
Win	6.	Aug 2007	ITF Vigo, Spain	25,000	Hard	(Spain) Carla Suárez Navarro	(Germany) Ria Sabay (Germany) Justine Ozga	6–1, 4–6, 6–3
Loss	5.	Mar 2008	ITF La Palma, Spain	25,000	Hard	(Spain) Sílvia Soler Espinosa	(Ukraine) Yuliya Beygelzimer (Switzerland) Stefanie Vögele	5–7, 6–7^{(5)}
Loss	6.	Jun 2008	ITF Getxo, Spain	25,000	Clay	(Spain) Sara del Barrio Aragón	(France) Julie Coin (United States) Story Tweedie-Yates	3–6, 1–6
Loss	7.	Jul 2009	ITF Valladolid, Spain	25,000	Clay	(Spain) Sara del Barrio Aragón	(Canada) Heidi El Tabakh (Spain) Paula Fondevila Castro	2–6, 4–6
Loss	8.	Feb 2010	Copa Bionaire, Colombia	75,000	Clay	(Spain) Laura Pous Tió	(Romania) Edina Gallovits-Hall (Slovenia) Polona Hercog	6–3, 3–6, [8–10]
Loss	9.	Sep 2010	ITF Foggia, Italy	25,000	Clay	(Spain) Laura Pous Tió	(Argentina) María Irigoyen (Argentina) Florencia Molinero	2–6, 2–6
Loss	10.	Oct 2010	Open Saint-Raphaël, France	50,000	Hard (i)	(Spain) Laura Pous Tió	(Austria) Sandra Klemenschits (Germany) Tatjana Maria	2–6, 4–6
Win	7.	Oct 2011	ITF Seville, Spain	25,000	Clay	(Spain) Lara Arruabarrena	(Spain) Leticia Costas (Spain) Inés Ferrer Suárez	6–4, 6–4
Win	8.	Jun 2015	ITF Madrid, Spain	10,000	Clay	(Spain) Cristina Sánchez Quintanar	(Spain) Sílvia García Jiménez (Spain) Olga Sáez Larra	4–6, 6–4, [10–7]
Win	9.	Jul 2015	ITF Prokuplje, Serbia	10,000	Clay	(Australia) Alexandra Nancarrow	(Ukraine) Maryna Kolb (Ukraine) Nadiya Kolb	2–6, 6–4, [10–6]
Loss	11.	Sep 2015	ITF Barcelona, Spain	15,000	Clay	(Ukraine) Oleksandra Korashvili	(Spain) Aliona Bolsova (Italy) Gaia Sanesi	3–6, 4–6
Win	10.	Sep 2015	ITF Madrid, Spain	10,000	Hard	(Spain) Cristina Sánchez Quintanar	(Italy) Deborah Chiesa (Australia) Isabelle Wallace	7–6^{(4)}, 7–5
Win	11.	Sep 2015	ITF Madrid, Spain	10,000	Hard	(Spain) Cristina Sánchez Quintanar	(Spain) María Martínez Martínez (Spain) Olga Sáez Larra	6–4, 6–3
Win	12.	Oct 2015	ITF Melilla, Spain	10,000	Hard	(Ukraine) Oleksandra Korashvili	(Spain) Irene Burillo (Australia) Isabelle Wallace	6–3, 6–1
Win	13.	Nov 2015	ITF Vinaròs, Spain	10,000	Clay	(Ukraine) Oleksandra Korashvili	(Spain) Alicia Herrero Liñana (Russia) Ksenija Sharifova	6–2, 4–6, [10–5]
Loss	12.	May 2016	ITF Monzón, Spain	10,000	Hard	(Spain) Cristina Sánchez Quintanar	(France) Alice Bacquié (United Kingdom) Gabriella Taylor	1–6, 1–6
Win	14.	Jul 2017	ITF Turin, Italy	25,000	Clay	(Brazil) Paula Cristina Gonçalves	(Spain) Irene Burillo (Spain) Yvonne Cavallé Reimers	5–7, 6–0, [10–8]
Win	15.	Jul 2017	ITF Imola, Italy	25,000	Carpet	(Brazil) Paula Cristina Gonçalves	(Greece) Eleni Kordolaimi (Australia) Seone Mendez	6–3, 1–6, [10–3]
Loss	13.	Oct 2017	ITF Seville, Spain	25,000	Clay	(Venezuela) Andrea Gámiz	(Brazil) Luisa Stefani (Mexico) Renata Zarazúa	6–7^{(2)}, 6–7^{(3)}
Loss	14.	Oct 2017	ITF Riba-roja de Túria, Spain	15,000	Clay	(Spain) Ángela Fita Boluda	(Spain) Yvonne Cavallé Reimers (Argentina) Guadalupe Pérez Rojas	4–6, 4–6
Win	16.	Apr 2018	ITF Óbidos, Portugal	25,000	Carpet	(Spain) Ángela Fita Boluda	(United Kingdom) Freya Christie (Belgium) An-Sophie Mestach	7–6^{(3)}, 1–6, [10–6]
