= Open Féminin de Marseille =

Defunct tennis tournament
- Event name: Marseille
- Location: Marseille, France
- Venue: Tennis Club de Marseille
- Category: ITF Women's Circuit
- Surface: Clay
- Draw: 32S/32Q/16D
- Prize money: $100,000
- Website: Official website

The Open Féminin de Marseille (previously known as Open GDF Suez de Marseille) was a tournament for professional female tennis players played on outdoor clay courts. The event was classified as a $100,000 ITF Women's Circuit tournament. It was held annually in Marseille, France, from 1997 to 2017 (with the exception of 1998). The name was changed from Open GDF Suez de Marseille to Open Féminin de Marseille in 2013.

== Past finals ==
=== Singles ===
Year	Champion	Runner-up	Score
2017	(Italy) Jasmine Paolini	(Germany) Tatjana Maria	6–4, 2–6, 6–1
2016	(Montenegro) Danka Kovinić	(Chinese Taipei) Hsieh Su-wei	6–2, 6–3
2015	(Romania) Monica Niculescu	(France) Pauline Parmentier	6–2, 7–5
2014	(Romania) Alexandra Dulgheru	(Sweden) Johanna Larsson	6–3, 7–5
2013	(Germany) Andrea Petkovic	(Spain) Anabel Medina Garrigues	6–4, 6–2
2012	(Spain) Lourdes Domínguez Lino	(France) Pauline Parmentier	6–3, 6–3
2011	(France) Pauline Parmentier	(Romania) Irina-Camelia Begu	6–3, 6–2
2010	(Czech Republic) Klára Zakopalová	(Sweden) Johanna Larsson	6–3, 6–3
2009	(Romania) Raluca Olaru	(Slovenia) Maša Zec Peškirič	6–7^{(4–7)}, 7–5, 6–4
2008	(Belgium) Kirsten Flipkens	(France) Stéphanie Foretz	7–6^{(7–4)}, 6–2
2007	(Argentina) Jorgelina Cravero	(France) Stéphanie Cohen-Aloro	6–2, 6–4
2006	(Russia) Ekaterina Bychkova	(France) Séverine Brémond	6–1, 6–2
2005	(Spain) Conchita Martínez Granados	(Canada) Marie-Ève Pelletier	6–1, 6–1
2004	(Spain) Anabel Medina Garrigues	(Slovakia) Ľubomíra Kurhajcová	5–7, 6–3, 6–3
2003	(Spain) Arantxa Parra Santonja	(Luxembourg) Claudine Schaul	6–2, 6–1
2002	(Spain) Conchita Martínez Granados	(France) Émilie Loit	6–2, 3–6, 7–5
2001	(Czech Republic) Klára Koukalová	(Slovakia) Karina Habšudová	6–4, 4–6, 7–6^{(7–3)}
2000	(Spain) Ángeles Montolio	(Spain) Anabel Medina Garrigues	6–2, 6–7^{(4–7)}, 6–4
1999	(Spain) Ángeles Montolio	(Spain) Cristina Torrens Valero	6–4, 7–5
1997	(France) Amélie Cocheteux	(Croatia) Mirjana Lučić	4–6, 7–5, 6–4

=== Doubles ===
Year	Champions	Runners-up	Score
2017	(Russia) Natela Dzalamidze (Russia) Veronika Kudermetova	(Hungary) Dalma Gálfi (Slovenia) Dalila Jakupović	7–6^{(7–5)}, 6–4
2016	(Chinese Taipei) Hsieh Su-wei (United States) Nicole Melichar	(Slovakia) Jana Čepelová (Spain) Lourdes Domínguez Lino	1–6, 6–3, [10–3]
2015	(Argentina) Tatiana Búa (France) Laura Thorpe	(United States) Nicole Melichar (Ukraine) Maryna Zanevska	6–3, 3–6, [10–6]
2014	(Spain) Lourdes Domínguez Lino (Spain) Beatriz García Vidagany	(Ukraine) Yuliya Beygelzimer (Ukraine) Olga Savchuk	6–1, 6–2
2013	(Austria) Sandra Klemenschits (Slovenia) Andreja Klepač	(United States) Asia Muhammad (United States) Allie Will	1–6, 6–4, [10–5]
2012	(France) Séverine Beltrame (France) Laura Thorpe	(Germany) Kristina Barrois (Ukraine) Olga Savchuk	6–1, 6–4
2011	(Romania) Irina-Camelia Begu (Russia) Nina Bratchikova	(Romania) Laura Ioana Andrei (Romania) Mădălina Gojnea	6–2, 6–2
2010	(Sweden) Johanna Larsson (Austria) Yvonne Meusburger	(France) Stéphanie Cohen-Aloro (France) Aurélie Védy	6–4, 6–2
2009	(Italy) Tathiana Garbin (Argentina) María Emilia Salerni	(Switzerland) Timea Bacsinszky (Russia) Elena Bovina	6–7^{(4–7)}, 6–3, [10–7]
2008	(Romania) Ágnes Szatmári (France) Aurélie Védy	(Ukraine) Viktoriya Kutuzova (Russia) Anna Lapushchenkova	6–4, 6–3
2007	(Belarus) Ksenia Milevskaya (Brazil) Roxane Vaisemberg	(Argentina) Salome Llaguno (France) Nadege Vergos	6–2, 6–1
2006	(Spain) Conchita Martínez Granados (Spain) María José Martínez Sánchez	(France) Séverine Brémond (France) Stéphanie Cohen-Aloro	7–5, 6–4
2005	(Latvia) Līga Dekmeijere (France) Caroline Dhenin	(Brazil) Maria Fernanda Alves (Canada) Marie-Ève Pelletier	6–2, 1–6, 6–2
2004	(Israel) Shahar Pe'er (Russia) Elena Vesnina	(France) Kildine Chevalier (Spain) Conchita Martínez Granados	6–1, 6–1
2003	(Ukraine) Yuliana Fedak (Russia) Galina Fokina	(Romania) Andreea Ehritt-Vanc (Czech Republic) Renata Voráčová	6–4, 6–7^{(3–7)}, 6–3
2002	(Spain) Lourdes Domínguez Lino (Spain) Conchita Martínez Granados	(Germany) Vanessa Henke (Germany) Sandra Klösel	7–5, 4–6, 6–0
2001	(New Zealand) Leanne Baker (India) Manisha Malhotra	(France) Caroline Dhenin (Croatia) Maja Palaveršić	7–6^{(7–5)}, 6–2
2000	(Italy) Alice Canepa (Argentina) Mariana Díaz Oliva	(Bulgaria) Svetlana Krivencheva (Poland) Anna Bieleń-Żarska	6–2, 6–3
1999	(Spain) Gisela Riera (Romania) Raluca Sandu	(Czech Republic) Eva Martincová (Czech Republic) Lenka Němečková	6–4, 7–6
1997	(Hungary) Katalin Marosi (Argentina) Verónica Stele	(France) Caroline Dhenin (Georgia (country)) Nino Louarsabishvili	6–2, 4–6, 6–1
