= Laura Thorpe =

French tennis player

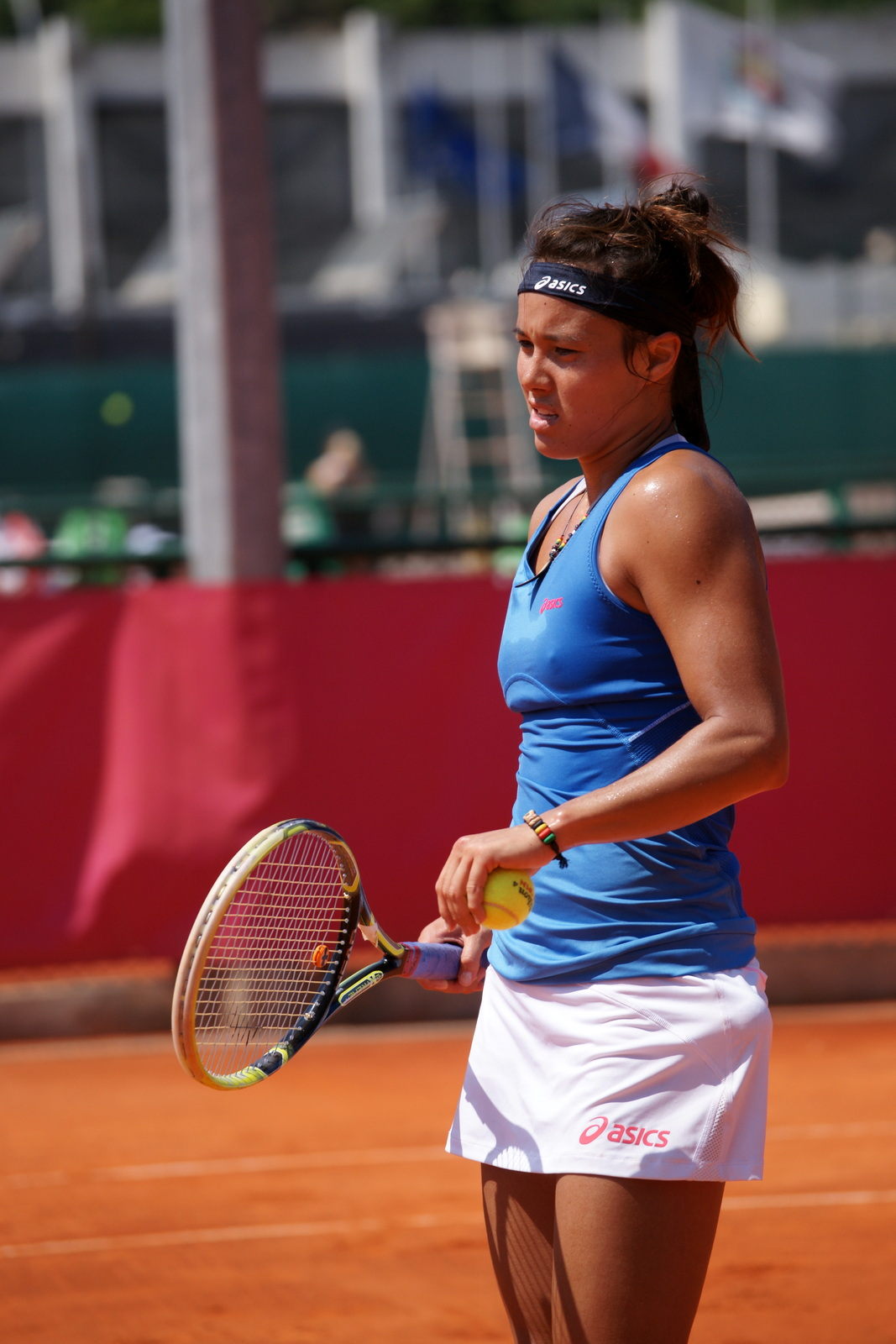
- Laura at the 2013 Open de Cagnes-sur-Mer
- Country (sports): France
- Born: 24 May 1987 (age 37)
- Plays: Right (two-handed backhand)
- Prize money: US$ 270,081

Singles
- Career record: 244–223
- Career titles: 2 ITF
- Highest ranking: No. 161 (6 June 2011)

Grand Slam singles results
- Australian Open: Q1 (2011)
- French Open: Q2 (2011,2012)
- Wimbledon: Q1 (2011)
- US Open: Q2 (2010)

Doubles
- Career record: 156–132
- Career titles: 16 ITF
- Highest ranking: No. 86 (28 April 2014)

Grand Slam doubles results
- French Open: 2R (2013)
- Wimbledon: Q1 (2013)

Laura Thorpe (French pronunciation: [loʁa tɔʁp]; born 24 May 1987) is a French former tennis player.

On 6 June 2011, she achieved a career-high singles ranking of world No. 161. On 28 April 2014, she peaked at No. 86 in the doubles rankings. In her career, she won two singles and 16 doubles titles on the ITF Circuit.

In 2013, Thorpe played her first WTA Tour final at the Luxembourg Open alongside Kristina Barrois, which they lost against Yanina Wickmayer and Stephanie Vogt.

== WTA Tour finals ==
=== Doubles: 1 (runner-up) ===
Legend Grand Slam tournaments Premier M & Premier 5 Premier (0–0) International (0–1)	Finals by surface Hard (0–1) Clay (0–0) Grass (0–0) Carpet (0–0)

Result	Date	Tournament	Surface	Partner	Opponents	Score
Loss	Oct 2013	Luxembourg Open	Hard (i)	(Germany) Kristina Barrois	(Liechtenstein) Stephanie Vogt (Belgium) Yanina Wickmayer	6–7^{(2)}, 4–6

== ITF Circuit finals ==
Legend
$100,000 tournaments
$75,000 tournaments
$50,000 tournaments
$25,000 tournaments
$10,000 tournaments

=== Singles: 8 (2 titles, 6 runner-ups) ===
Result	No.	Date	Tournament	Surface	Opponent	Score
Win	1.	16 July 2006	ITF Le Touquet, France	Clay	(France) Iryna Brémond	6–2, 3–6, 6–3
Loss	1.	6 August 2006	ITF Vigo, Spain	Hard	(Republic of Ireland) Kelly Liggan	1–6, 3–6
Loss	2.	14 February 2009	ITF Mallorca, Spain	Clay	(Austria) Tina Schiechtl	7–5, 4–6, 5–7
Win	2.	29 November 2009	ITF Vallduxo, Spain	Clay	(United Kingdom) Amanda Carreras	6–2, 6–2
Loss	3.	13 June 2010	ITF Campobasso, Italy	Clay	(Argentina) María Irigoyen	2–6, 6–7^{(5)}
Loss	4.	25 June 2011	ITF Rome–Tevere Remo, Italy	Clay	(Italy) Karin Knapp	3–6, 0–6
Loss	5.	18 September 2011	ITF Mont-de-Marsan, France	Clay	(Peru) Bianca Botto	2–6, 4–6
Loss	6.	11 August 2013	Ladies Open Hechingen, Germany	Clay	(Germany) Carina Witthöft	1–6, 4–6

=== Doubles: 24 (16 titles, 8 runner-ups) ===
Result	No.	Date	Tournament	Surface	Partner	Opponents	Score
Win	1.	18 February 2006	ITF Mallorca, Spain	Clay	(Spain) Marta Fraga	(Spain) Estrella Cabeza Candela (Spain) Núria Roig	6–4, 7–5
Loss	1.	3 June 2006	ITF Tortosa, Spain	Clay	(Spain) Irene Rehberger Bescos	(France) Émilie Bacquet (Morocco) Bahia Mouhtassine	6–1, 4–6, 6–7^{(5)}
Win	2.	13 February 2009	ITF Mallorca, Spain	Clay	(Serbia) Neda Kozić	(Czech Republic) Simona Dobrá (Poland) Magdalena Kiszczyńska	6–3, 2–6, [10–3]
Loss	2.	20 March 2009	ITF Tenerife, Spain	Hard	(Spain) Paula Fondevila Castro	(China) Sun Shengnan (China) Zhang Shuai	1–6, 2–6
Win	3.	1 August 2009	ITF Vigo, Spain	Hard	(Poland) Karolina Kosińska	(United Kingdom) Jade Curtis (United Kingdom) Georgie Gent	7–6^{(3)}, 6–2
Win	4.	21 November 2009	ITF Cairo, Egypt	Clay	(Romania) Mihaela Buzărnescu	(Oman) Fatma Al-Nabhani (Russia) Galina Fokina	6–4, 6–0
Loss	3.	12 June 2010	ITF Campobasso, Italy	Clay	(Argentina) María Irigoyen	(Ukraine) Yuliana Fedak (Ukraine) Anastasiya Vasylyeva	6–2, 3–6, [6–10]
Loss	4.	24 July 2010	ITF Pétange, Luxembourg	Clay	(France) Sophie Lefèvre	(Canada) Sharon Fichman (Romania) Monica Niculescu	4–6, 2–6
Win	5.	21 January 2012	ITF Plantation, United States	Clay	(Colombia) Catalina Castaño	(United States) Jessica Pegula (United States) Ahsha Rolle	6–4, 6–2
Win	6.	15 June 2012	Open de Marseille, France	Clay	(France) Séverine Beltrame	(Germany) Kristina Barrois (Ukraine) Olga Savchuk	6–1, 6–4
Win	7.	22 June 2012	Open de Montpellier, France	Clay	(France) Séverine Beltrame	(Argentina) Mailen Auroux (Argentina) María Irigoyen	4–6, 6–4, [10–6]
Win	8.	29 June 2012	ITF Rome, Italy	Clay	(Canada) Marie-Ève Pelletier	(United States) Julia Cohen (Ukraine) Valentyna Ivakhnenko	6–0, 3–6, [10–8]
Win	9.	12 July 2012	Open de Biarritz, France	Clay	(France) Séverine Beltrame	(Spain) Lara Arruabarrena (Puerto Rico) Monica Puig	6–2, 6–3
Loss	5.	5 August 2012	ITF Bad Saulgau, Germany	Clay	(Russia) Anastasia Pivovarova	(Spain) Rocio de la Torre Sanchez (Austria) Nicole Rottmann	5–7, 1–6
Win	10.	24 August 2012	ITF Charleroi, Belgium	Clay	(France) Séverine Beltrame	(Belarus) Ilona Kremen (Latvia) Diāna Marcinkēviča	3–6, 6–4, [10–7]
Win	11.	28 June 2013	ITF Périgueux, France	Clay	(Slovakia) Michaela Hončová	(Netherlands) Anna Katalina Alzate (Bulgaria) Dia Evtimova	7–6^{(7)}, 6–1
Loss	6.	11 August 2013	Ladies Open Hechingen, Germany	Clay	(Romania) Laura Ioana Andrei	(Czech Republic) Barbora Krejčíková (Czech Republic) Kateřina Siniaková	1–6, 4–6
Win	12.	6 September 2013	Save Cup, Italy	Clay	(Liechtenstein) Stephanie Vogt	(Czech Republic) Petra Krejsová (Czech Republic) Tereza Smitková	7–6^{(5)}, 7–5
Loss	7.	13 September 2013	ITF Mont-de-Marsan, France	Clay	(France) Alizé Lim	(Chile) Cecilia Costa Melgar (Chile) Daniela Seguel	4–6, 2–6
Win	13.	4 October 2013	ITF La Vall d'Uixó, Spain	Clay	(Argentina) Florencia Molinero	(Netherlands) Cindy Burger (Netherlands) Arantxa Rus	6–1, 6–4
Loss	8.	7 March 2014	ITF Campinas, Brazil	Clay	(Liechtenstein) Stephanie Vogt	(Ukraine) Lyudmyla Kichenok (Russia) Alexandra Panova	1–6, 3–6
Win	14.	5 July 2014	Lorraine Open, France	Clay	(Russia) Alexandra Panova	(Romania) Irina-Camelia Begu (Argentina) María Irigoyen	6–3, 4–0 ret.
Win	15.	10 May 2015	Open de Cagnes-sur-Mer, France	Clay	(United Kingdom) Johanna Konta	(United Kingdom) Jocelyn Rae (United Kingdom) Anna Smith	1–6, 6–4, [10–5]
Win	16.	6 June 2015	Open de Marseille, France	Clay	(Argentina) Tatiana Búa	(United States) Nicole Melichar (Ukraine) Maryna Zanevska	6–3, 3–6, [10–6]
