= 2007 İstanbul Cup – Singles =

Singles
- 2007 İstanbul Cup

Final
- Champion: (Russia) Elena Dementieva
- Runner-up: (France) Aravane Rezaï
- Score: 7–6^{(7–5)}, 3–0, retired

Details
- Draw: 30
- Seeds: 8

Events
Singles	Doubles
← 2006 ·	İstanbul Cup	· 2008 →

The 2007 İstanbul Cup – Singles was an event of the 2007 İstanbul Cup women's tennis tournament and took place between 21 May and 26 May 2007 on outdoor clay courts in Istanbul, Turkey. Second-seeded Elena Dementieva won the title, defeating Aravane Rezaï in the final.

== Seeds ==
1. (Russia) Maria Sharapova (semifinals)
2. (Russia) Elena Dementieva (champion)
3. (Switzerland) Patty Schnyder (quarterfinals)
4. (United States) Venus Williams (second round)
5. (Ukraine) Alona Bondarenko (semifinals)
6. (Germany) Anna-Lena Grönefeld (first round)
7. (Poland) Agnieszka Radwańska (quarterfinals)
8. (India) Sania Mirza (first round)

== Draw ==
Key

- Q = Qualifier
- WC = Wild card
- LL = Lucky loser
- Alt = Alternate
- ITF = ITF entry
- PR = Protected ranking
- SR = Special ranking
- SE = Special exempt
- JE = Junior exempt
- JR = Junior Accelerator Programme entrant
- CO = College Accelerator Programme entrant
- NG = Next Gen Accelerator Program entrant
- w/o = Walkover
- r = Retired
- d = Defaulted

=== Finals ===
Semifinals
1/WC	(Russia) Maria Sharapova	2	4
(France) Aravane Rezaï	6	6
5	(Ukraine) Alona Bondarenko	6^{5}	2
2	(Russia) Elena Dementieva	7^{7}	6

Finals
(France) Aravane Rezaï	6^{5}	0^{r}
2	(Russia) Elena Dementieva	7^{7}	3

=== Top half ===
First round
(Bulgaria) T Pironkova	6	2	6
(Belarus) O Govortsova	4	6	2
(Ukraine) K Bondarenko	4	4
(Italy) R Oprandi	6	6
(Russia) E Bychkova	5	5
7	(Poland) A Radwańska	7	7
4	(United States) V Williams	6	6
(Belarus) T Poutchek	1	2
(Israel) T Obziler	3	1
(France) A Rezaï	6	6
Q	(Russia) E Afinogenova	6	5	6
(Germany) S Klösel	3	7	3
(United States) M Shaughnessy	6	6
8	(India) S Mirza	4	3

Second round
1/WC	(Russia) M Sharapova	6	7^{7}
(Bulgaria) T Pironkova	4	6^{1}
(Italy) R Oprandi	1	0
7	(Poland) A Radwańska	6	6
4	(United States) V Williams	4	4
(France) A Rezaï	6	6
Q	(Russia) E Afinogenova	1	3
(United States) M Shaughnessy	6	6

Quarterfinals
1/WC	(Russia) M Sharapova	6	3	6
7	(Poland) A Radwańska	2	6	0
(France) A Rezaï	1	6	6
(United States) M Shaughnessy	6	1	4

Semifinals
1/WC	(Russia) M Sharapova	2	4
(France) A Rezaï	6	6

=== Bottom half ===
First round
5	(Ukraine) A Bondarenko	6	6
WC	(Turkey) P Özgen	1	0
Q	(Latvia) A Sevastova	6	6
(Belarus) A Yakimova	1	3
WC	(Turkey) İ Şenoğlu	3	5
(United States) V King	6	7
(Chinese Taipei) Y-j Chan	1	1
3	(Switzerland) P Schnyder	6	6
6	(Germany) A-L Grönefeld	6^{3}	2
(Colombia) C Castaño	7^{7}	6
Q	(Belarus) E Dzehalevich	6	7
Q	(Georgia (country)) A Tatishvili	3	5
(Russia) Y Shvedova	6	3	4
(Croatia) J Kostanić Tošić	2	6	6

Second round
5	(Ukraine) A Bondarenko	6	3	7^{7}
Q	(Latvia) A Sevastova	4	6	6^{5}
(United States) V King	4	1
3	(Switzerland) P Schnyder	6	6
(Colombia) C Castaño	4	7	6
Q	(Belarus) E Dzehalevich	6	5	1
(Croatia) J Kostanić Tošić	3	3
2	(Russia) E Dementieva	6	6

Quarterfinals
5	(Ukraine) A Bondarenko	w	/	o
3	(Switzerland) P Schnyder
(Colombia) C Castaño	6	4	4
2	(Russia) E Dementieva	1	6	6

Semifinals
5	(Ukraine) A Bondarenko	6^{5}	2
2	(Russia) E Dementieva	7^{7}	6

== Qualifying ==
=== Qualifiers ===
- Section 1: (Russia) Ekaterina Afinogenova
- Section 2: (Georgia (country)) Anna Tatishvili
- Section 3: (Belarus) Ekaterina Dzehalevich
- Section 4: (Latvia) Anastasija Sevastova

=== Seeds ===
1. (Australia) Casey Dellacqua (second round)
2. (Romania) Sorana Cîrstea (second round)
3. (Belarus) Ekaterina Dzehalevich (qualified)
4. (Switzerland) Gaëlle Widmer (first round)
5. (Russia) Vesna Manasieva (first round)
6. (United States) Neha Uberoi (first round)
7. (Russia) Evgenia Grebenyuk (second round)
8. (Romania) Mihaela Buzărnescu (Qualifying)

=== First qualifier ===
1st Round
1	(Australia) C Dellacqua	6	6
(Greece) A Koumantou	3	1
(Russia) E Afinogenova	6	6
(Ukraine) K Poulnina	3	1
(United States) B Whitehead	0	0
(Bosnia and Herzegovina) M Jugić-Salkić	6	6
(Russia) A Gabueva	1	3
6	(United States) N Uberoi	6	6

2nd Round
1	(Australia) C Dellacqua	3	1
(Russia) E Afinogenova	6	6
(Bosnia and Herzegovina) M Jugić-Salkić	6^{5}	6	6
6	(United States) N Uberoi	7^{7}	4	4

Qualifying
(Russia) E Afinogenova	6	6
(Bosnia and Herzegovina) M Jugić-Salkić	1	3

=== Second qualifier ===
1st Round
2	(Romania) S Cîrstea	4	7	6
(Russia) A Lapushchenkova	6	5	0
WC	(Turkey) T Doğan	1	0
(Georgia (country)) A Tatishvili	6	6
WC	(Turkey) E Benli	5	3
(United States) A Stevenson	7	6
(Russia) N Samoylo	0	0
8	(Romania) M Buzărnescu	6	6

2nd Round
2	(Romania) S Cîrstea	6^{3}	6	4
(Georgia (country)) A Tatishvili	7^{7}	2	6
(United States) A Stevenson	4	1
8	(Romania) M Buzărnescu	6	4	r

Qualifying
(Georgia (country)) A Tatishvili	7^{7}	5	7^{8}
8	(Romania) M Buzărnescu	6^{5}	7	6^{6}

=== Third qualifier ===
1st Round
3	(Belarus) E Dzehalevich	6	7^{7}
(Ukraine) O Lyubtsova	1	6^{5}
WC	(Turkey) C Büyükakçay	6	4	2
(Georgia (country)) S Shapatava	2	6	6
(Poland) U Radwańska	6	3	7
(Serbia) V Lukić	2	6	5
(Russia) E Dranets	0	2
7	(Russia) E Grebenyuk	6	6

2nd Round
3	(Belarus) E Dzehalevich	6	3	6
(Georgia (country)) S Shapatava	0	6	2
(Poland) U Radwańska	6	2	6
7	(Russia) E Grebenyuk	1	6	2

Qualifying
3	(Belarus) E Dzehalevich	6	6
(Poland) U Radwańska	2	2

=== Fourth qualifier ===
1st Round
4	(Switzerland) G Widmer	5	2
(Latvia) A Sevastova	7	6
(France) I Pavlovic	6	6
WC	(Australia) J Hopper	2	1
(Russia) V Davydova	2	3
(Italy) S Menna	6	6
(Slovakia) J Juricová	6	6
5	(Russia) V Manasieva	4	3

2nd Round
(Latvia) A Sevastova	6	6
(France) I Pavlovic	4	2
(Italy) S Menna	4	1
(Slovakia) J Juricová	6	6

Qualifying
(Latvia) A Sevastova	6	6
(Slovakia) J Juricová	1	2
