= 2006 İstanbul Cup – Doubles =

Doubles
- 2006 İstanbul Cup

Final
- Champions: (Ukraine) Alona Bondarenko (Belarus) Anastasiya Yakimova
- Runners-up: (India) Sania Mirza (Australia) Alicia Molik
- Score: 6–2, 6–4

Details
- Draw: 16
- Seeds: 4

Events
Singles	Doubles
← 2005 ·	İstanbul Cup	· 2007 →

The women's doubles Tournament at the 2006 İstanbul Cup took place between 22 May and 27 May on outdoor clay courts in Istanbul, Turkey. Alona Bondarenko and Anastasiya Yakimova won the title, defeating Sania Mirza and Alicia Molik in the final.

== Seeds ==
1. (Germany) Anna-Lena Grönefeld / (United States) Meghann Shaughnessy (first round, withdrew due to Shaughnessy's right ankle sprain)
2. (Italy) Maria Elena Camerin / (Switzerland) Emmanuelle Gagliardi (first round)
3. (Greece) Eleni Daniilidou / (Germany) Jasmin Wöhr (quarterfinals)
4. (United States) Ashley Harkleroad / (United States) Bethanie Mattek (quarterfinals)

== Draw ==
Key

- Q = Qualifier
- WC = Wild card
- LL = Lucky loser
- Alt = Alternate
- ITF = ITF entry
- PR = Protected ranking
- SR = Special ranking
- SE = Special exempt
- JE = Junior exempt
- JR = Junior Accelerator Programme entrant
- CO = College Accelerator Programme entrant
- NG = Next Gen Accelerator Program entrant
- w/o = Walkover
- r = Retired
- d = Defaulted

First round
1	(Germany) A-L Grönefeld (United States) M Shaughnessy
(India) S Mirza (Australia) A Molik	w	/	o
(Russia) A Myskina (Turkey) İ Şenoğlu	4	7	1
(Croatia) J Kostanić (Indonesia) A Widjaja	6	5	6
4	(United States) A Harkleroad (United States) B Mattek	6	6
(Austria) D Klemenschits (Austria) S Klemenschits	3	3
(Ukraine) Y Fedak (Czech Republic) E Hrdinová	6	6
LL	(Russia) V Davydova (Russia) O Panova	2	4
(Italy) S Errani (Lithuania) L Stančiūtė	4	4
(Ukraine) A Bondarenko (Belarus) A Yakimova	6	6
(Russia) A Chakvetadze (Netherlands) M Krajicek	4	2
3	(Greece) E Daniilidou (Germany) J Wöhr	6	6
(Slovakia) J Husárová (Israel) S Pe'er	6	6
(Italy) M Santangelo (United States) M Washington	2	2
Q	(Poland) A Radwańska (Poland) U Radwańska	7	6
2	(Italy) M E Camerin (Switzerland) E Gagliardi	5	3

Quarterfinals
(India) S Mirza (Australia) A Molik	6	6
(Croatia) J Kostanić (Indonesia) A Widjaja	3	3
4	(United States) A Harkleroad (United States) B Mattek
(Ukraine) Y Fedak (Czech Republic) E Hrdinová	w	/	o
(Ukraine) A Bondarenko (Belarus) A Yakimova	6	6
3	(Greece) E Daniilidou (Germany) J Wöhr	1	2
(Slovakia) J Husárová (Israel) S Pe'er	6	7
Q	(Poland) A Radwańska (Poland) U Radwańska	2	5

Semifinals
(India) S Mirza (Australia) A Molik	3	6	7^{7}
(Ukraine) Y Fedak (Czech Republic) E Hrdinová	6	3	6^{3}
(Ukraine) A Bondarenko (Belarus) A Yakimova	3	6	7^{7}
(Slovakia) J Husárová (Israel) S Pe'er	6	3	6^{2}

Finals
(India) S Mirza (Australia) A Molik	2	4
(Ukraine) A Bondarenko (Belarus) A Yakimova	6	6

== Qualification draw ==
Key

- Q = Qualifier
- WC = Wild card
- LL = Lucky loser
- Alt = Alternate
- ITF = ITF entry
- PR = Protected ranking
- SR = Special ranking
- SE = Special exempt
- JE = Junior exempt
- JR = Junior Accelerator Programme entrant
- CO = College Accelerator Programme entrant
- NG = Next Gen Accelerator Program entrant
- w/o = Walkover
- r = Retired
- d = Defaulted

First round			Finals
1	(Russia) V Davydova (Russia) O Panova	82
WC	(Belarus) O Govortsova (Russia) I Kotkina		1	(Russia) V Davydova (Russia) O Panova	3	4
	(Georgia (country)) M Chakhnashvili (Belarus) E Dzehlevich		2	(Poland) A Radwańska (Poland) U Radwańska	6	6
2	(Poland) A Radwańska (Poland) U Radwańska	98(4)
