= 2005 İstanbul Cup – Singles =

Singles
- 2005 İstanbul Cup

Final
- Champion: (United States) Venus Williams
- Runner-up: (Czech Republic) Nicole Vaidišová
- Score: 6–3, 6–2

Details
- Draw: 30
- Seeds: 8

Events
Singles	Doubles
İstanbul Cup	· 2006 →

This was the first time a WTA level was held in Istanbul.Top seed Venus Williams won the title, defeating Nicole Vaidišová in the final, 6–3, 6–2.

== Seeds ==
The top two seeds received a bye into the second round.

1. (United States) Venus Williams (champion)
2. (Czech Republic) Nicole Vaidišová (final)
3. (Israel) Anna Smashnova (semifinals)
4. (United States) Lisa Raymond (first round)
5. (Germany) Anna-Lena Grönefeld (quarterfinals)
6. (United States) Meghann Shaughnessy (first round)
7. (Russia) Anna Chakvetadze (quarterfinals)
8. (United States) Mashona Washington (quarterfinals)

== Draw ==
Key

- Q = Qualifier
- WC = Wild card
- LL = Lucky loser
- Alt = Alternate
- ITF = ITF entry
- PR = Protected ranking
- SR = Special ranking
- SE = Special exempt
- JE = Junior exempt
- JR = Junior Accelerator Programme entrant
- CO = College Accelerator Programme entrant
- NG = Next Gen Accelerator Program entrant
- w/o = Walkover
- r = Retired
- d = Defaulted

=== Finals ===
Semifinals
1	(United States) Venus Williams	6	6
Q	(Bulgaria) Tsvetana Pironkova	1	3
3	(Israel) Anna Smashnova	6	1	0
2	(Czech Republic) Nicole Vaidišová	4	6	6

Final
1	(United States) Venus Williams	6	6
2	(Czech Republic) Nicole Vaidišová	3	2

=== Top half ===
First round
(Spain) M Marrero	6	6
(Japan) S Hisamatsu	0	2
(Russia) T Panova	6	5	6
(United States) J Craybas	4	7	4
(Italy) An Serra Zanetti	5	2
7	(Russia) A Chakvetadze	7	6
4	(United States) L Raymond	1	2
(Japan) A Morigami	6	6
LL	(Ukraine) K Bondarenko	2	2
(Israel) S Pe'er	6	6
(United States) M Irvin	6	2	5
(Ukraine) Y Fedak	4	6	7
Q	(Bulgaria) T Pironkova	6	7
6	(United States) M Shaughnessy	3	5

Second round
1	(United States) V Williams	6	6
(Spain) M Marrero	0	0
(Russia) T Panova	7	4	1
7	(Russia) A Chakvetadze	5	6	6
(Japan) A Morgami	6	4	2
(Israel) S Pe'er	3	6	6
(Ukraine) Y Fedak	6	4	4
Q	(Bulgaria) T Pironkova	3	6	6

Quarterfinals
1	(United States) V Williams	6	6
7	(Russia) A Chakvetadze	2	1
(Israel) S Pe'er	3	6^{4}
Q	(Bulgaria) T Pironkova	6	7^{7}

Semifinals
1	(United States) V Williams	6	6
Q	(Bulgaria) T Pironkova	1	3

=== Bottom half ===
First round
8	(United States) M Washington	6	2	7
(Ukraine) A Bondarenko	4	6	5
Q	(Russia) E Vesnina	6	6
WC	(Turkey) Ç Büyükakçay	1	2
(United States) J Hopkins	4	6	6
(Slovenia) M Matevžič	6	0	1
(Colombia) C Castaño	3	6	2
3	(Israel) A Smashnova	6	2	6
5	(Germany) A-L Grönefeld	6	7
(Argentina) M Díaz Oliva	3	5
Q	(Lithuania) L Stančiūtė	4	7^{7}	3
(Switzerland) E Gagliardi	6	6^{5}	6
WC	(Turkey) P Özgen	3	0
Q	(Croatia) I Abramović	6	6

Second round
8	(United States) M Washington	7	6
Q	(Russia) E Vesnina	5	1
(United States) J Hopkins	1	0
3	(Israel) A Smashnova	6	6
5	(Germany) A-L Grönefeld	6	6
(Switzerland) E Gagliardi	3	2
Q	(Croatia) I Abramović	2	3
2	(Czech Republic) N Vaidišová	6	6

Quarterfinals
8	(United States) M Washington	3	1
3	(Israel) A Smashnova	6	6
5	(Germany) A-L Grönefeld	5	6^{6}
2	(Czech Republic) N Vaidišová	7	7^{8}

Semifinals
3	(Israel) A Smashnova	6	1	0
2	(Czech Republic) N Vaidišová	4	6	6
