= 2005 İstanbul Cup =

- Date: 16–21 May
- Edition: 1st
- Category: WTA Tier III
- Draw: 30S / 16D
- Prize money: $ 200,000
- Surface: Clay / outdoor
- Location: Istanbul, Turkey

Champions

Singles
- (United States) Venus Williams

Doubles
- (Spain) Marta Marrero / (Italy) Antonella Serra Zanetti
İstanbul Cup	· 2006 →

The 2005 İstanbul Cup was a women's tennis tournament played on outdoor clay courts. It was the inaugural edition of the İstanbul Cup, and was part of the Tier III category of the 2005 WTA Tour. It was held in Istanbul from 16 May through 21 May 2005. First-seeded Venus Williams won the singles title.

== Finals ==
=== Singles ===
(United States) Venus Williams defeated (Czech Republic) Nicole Vaidišová, 6–3, 6–2

- It was Williams' 1st singles title of the year and the 32nd of her career.

=== Doubles ===
(Spain) Marta Marrero / (Italy) Antonella Serra Zanetti defeated (Austria) Daniela Klemenschits / (Austria) Sandra Klemenschits, 6–4, 6–0

== Points and prize money ==
=== Point distribution ===
Event	W	F	SF	QF	Round of 16	Round of 32	Q3	Q2	Q1
Singles	120	185	55	30	26	1	3.75	2.25	1
Doubles	120	185	55	30	1	—	—	—	—

=== Prize money ===
Event	W	F	SF	QF	Round of 16	Round of 32	Q3	Q2	Q1
Singles	$30,500	$16,450	$8,840	$4,745	$2,550	$1,370	$735	$395	$215
Doubles *	$9,150	$4,900	$2,625	$1,410	$760	—	—	—	—

_{* per team}

== Singles main-draw entrants ==
=== Seeds ===
Country	Player	Rank	Seed
USA	Venus Williams	14	1
CZE	Nicole Vaidišová	39	2
ISR	Anna Smashnova	41	3
USA	Lisa Raymond	44	4
GER	Anna-Lena Grönefeld	51	5
USA	Meghann Shaughnessy	54	6
RUS	Anna Chakvetadze	61	7
USA	Mashona Washington	67	8

=== Other entrants ===
The following players received wildcards into the singles main draw:

- (Turkey) Çağla Büyükakçay
- (Turkey) Pemra Özgen

The following players received entry from the qualifying draw:

- (Croatia) Ivana Abramović
- (Bulgaria) Tsvetana Pironkova
- (Lithuania) Lina Stančiūtė
- (Russia) Elena Vesnina

The following players received entry as lucky losers:

- (Ukraine) Katerina Bondarenko

== Doubles main-draw entrants ==
=== Seeds ===
Country	Player	Country	Player	Rank	Seed
USA	Lisa Raymond	AUS	Rennae Stubbs	14	1
USA	Jill Craybas	USA	Jennifer Russell	115	2
SUI	Emmanuelle Gagliardi	TUR	İpek Şenoğlu	125	3
ESP	Marta Marrero	ITA	Antonella Serra Zanetti	154	4

=== Other entrants ===
The following pairs received wildcards into the doubles main draw:

- (Russia) Anna Chakvetadze / (Turkey) Pemra Özgen
