= Batumi Ladies Open =

ITF Women's Tour
- Event name: Batumi Ladies Open
- Location: Batumi, Georgia
- Venue: Batumi Tennis Club
- Category: ITF Women's Circuit
- Surface: Hard
- Draw: 32S/16Q/16D
- Prize money: $15,000
- Website: http://www.tennisgeorgia.ge/

The Batumi Ladies Open is a tournament for professional female tennis players. The event is classified as a $15,000 ITF Women's Circuit tournament. It has been held on outdoor hardcourts in Batumi, Georgia, since 1997 ($10k; later $15–75k).

== Past finals ==
=== Singles ===
Year	Champion	Runner-up	Score
2019	(Russia) Daria Kudashova	(Poland) Weronika Falkowska	6–4, 6–2
2018	(Russia) Daria Kudashova	(Russia) Gyulnara Nazarova	5–7, 6–0, 6–3
2017	(Uzbekistan) Nigina Abduraimova	(Russia) Anna Kalinskaya	3–6, 6–4, 6–3
2016	(Georgia (country)) Mariam Bolkvadze	(Russia) Aleksandra Pospelova	6–4, 7–6^{(10–8)}
2015	(Turkey) Çağla Büyükakçay	(Russia) Alena Tarasova	6–2, 6–0
2014	(Belgium) An-Sophie Mestach	(Ukraine) Olga Ianchuk	6–2, 6–0
2013	(Russia) Alexandra Panova	(Ukraine) Kateryna Kozlova	6–4, 0–6, 7–5
2012	(Armenia) Ani Amiraghyan	(Ukraine) Anna Shkudun	6–1, 6–3
2011–08	Not held		
2007	(Russia) Ksenia Pervak	(Italy) Corinna Dentoni	6–4, 6–3
2006	(Romania) Ágnes Szatmári	(Czech Republic) Petra Cetkovská	6–3, 6–3
2005	(Belarus) Anastasiya Yakimova	(Serbia and Montenegro) Ana Timotić	6–4, 6–1
2004	(Serbia and Montenegro) Ana Ivanovic	(Russia) Anna Chakvetadze	6–3, 6–3
2003	(Ukraine) Elena Tatarkova	(Russia) Evgenia Linetskaya	6–1, 4–6, 3–6
2002	(Belarus) Nadejda Ostrovskaya	(Ukraine) Alona Bondarenko	1–6, 6–2, 6–4
2001	(Belarus) Tatiana Poutchek	(Belarus) Nadejda Ostrovskaya	7–5, 4–6, 6–3
2000	(Belarus) Tatiana Poutchek	(Belarus) Nadejda Ostrovskaya	4–1, 4–1, 2–4, 1–4, 5–4^{(6–4)}
1999	(Hungary) Katalin Marosi vs. (Germany) Julia Abe		Not finished
1998	(Netherlands) Amanda Hopmans	(Russia) Anastasia Myskina	6–2, 7–5
1997	(Russia) Anastasia Myskina	(Russia) Elena Dementieva	6–7^{(1–7)}, 6–4, 7–5

=== Doubles ===
Year	Champions	Runners-up	Score
2019	(Sweden) Jacqueline Cabaj Awad (Turkey) Melis Sezer	(Poland) Weronika Falkowska (Poland) Paulina Jastrzębska	7–6^{(7–3)}, 6–3
2018	(United Kingdom) Aleksandra Pitak (United Kingdom) Katarzyna Pitak	(Russia) Aleksandra Kuznetsova (Russia) Gyulnara Nazarova	6–0, 4–1 ret.
2017	(Belgium) Ysaline Bonaventure (Slovakia) Viktória Kužmová	(Georgia (country)) Tatia Mikadze (Georgia (country)) Sofia Shapatava	6–1, 6–3
2016	(Ukraine) Alona Fomina (Russia) Margarita Lazareva	(Georgia (country)) Mariam Bolkvadze (Georgia (country)) Tatia Mikadze	6–4, 6–3
2015	(Russia) Natela Dzalamidze (Russia) Alena Tarasova	(Russia) Angelina Gabueva (Ukraine) Elizaveta Ianchuk	5–7, 6–1, [10–7]
2014	(Belgium) An-Sophie Mestach (Poland) Sandra Zaniewska	(Bulgaria) Aleksandrina Naydenova (Ukraine) Valeriya Strakhova	6–1, 6–1
2013	(Ukraine) Valentyna Ivakhnenko (Ukraine) Kateryna Kozlova	(Germany) Christina Shakovets (Ukraine) Alona Fomina	6–0, 6–4
2012	(Russia) Yuliya Kalabina (Russia) Eugeniya Pashkova	(Ukraine) Alona Fomina (Ukraine) Anna Shkudun	7–6^{(7–5)}, 6–1
2011–08	Not held		
2007	(Romania) Mihaela Buzărnescu (Serbia) Vojislava Lukić	(Russia) Vasilisa Davydova (Russia) Marina Shamayko	6–2, 6–4
2006	(Czech Republic) Petra Cetkovská (Turkey) İpek Şenoğlu	(Russia) Vasilisa Davydova (Russia) Marina Shamayko	6–4, 3–6, 6–4
2005	(Belarus) Nadejda Ostrovskaya (Belarus) Anastasiya Yakimova	(Russia) Anna Bastrikova (Russia) Nina Bratchikova	2–6, 6–2, 7–6^{(11–9)}
2004	(Ukraine) Alona Bondarenko (Russia) Galina Fokina	(Russia) Anna Bastrikova (Russia) Irina Kotkina	6–2, 6–2
2003	(Belarus) Darya Kustova (Ukraine) Elena Tatarkova	(Russia) Goulnara Fattakhetdinova (Russia) Galina Fokina	1–6, 6–1, 6–2
2002	(Bulgaria) Antoaneta Pandjerova (Bulgaria) Desislava Topalova	(Russia) Goulnara Fattakhetdinova (Russia) Maria Kondratieva	2–6, 6–1, 6–1
2001	(Hungary) Katalin Marosi-Aracama (Belarus) Tatiana Poutchek	(Belarus) Nadejda Ostrovskaya (Russia) Anastasia Rodionova	6–3, 7–6^{(7–3)}
2000	(Belarus) Tatiana Poutchek (Ukraine) Tatiana Perebiynis	(Argentina) Mariana Díaz Oliva (Denmark) Eva Dyrberg	1–4, 4–2, 4–1, 4–2
1999	(Romania) Magda Mihalache (Slovakia) Zuzana Váleková	(Romania) Cătălina Cristea (South Africa) Surina De Beer	6–4, 3–6, 6–4
1998	(Russia) Evgenia Kulikovskaya (Russia) Ekaterina Sysoeva	(Netherlands) Amanda Hopmans (Austria) Melanie Schnell	6–4, 3–6, 6–0
1997	(Russia) Elena Dementieva (Russia) Anastasia Myskina	(Slovakia) Danica Kováčová (Ukraine) Irina Nossenko	6–1, 1–0 ret.
