= 2005 İstanbul Cup – Doubles =

Doubles
- 2005 İstanbul Cup

Final
- Champions: (Spain) Marta Marrero (Italy) Antonella Serra Zanetti
- Runners-up: (Austria) Daniela Klemenschits (Austria) Sandra Klemenschits
- Score: 6–4, 6–0

Details
- Draw: 16
- Seeds: 4

Events
Singles	Doubles
İstanbul Cup	· 2006 →

This was the first edition of the tournament.

Marta Marrero and Antonella Serra Zanetti won the title by defeating Daniela Klemenschits and Sandra Klemenschits 6–4, 6–0 in the final.

== Seeds ==
1. (United States) Lisa Raymond / (Australia) Rennae Stubbs (first round)
2. (United States) Jill Craybas / (United States) Jennifer Russell (first round)
3. (Switzerland) Emmanuelle Gagliardi / (Turkey) İpek Şenoğlu (quarterfinals)
4. (Spain) Marta Marrero / (Italy) Antonella Serra Zanetti (champions)

== Draw ==
Key

- Q = Qualifier
- WC = Wild card
- LL = Lucky loser
- Alt = Alternate
- ITF = ITF entry
- PR = Protected ranking
- SR = Special ranking
- SE = Special exempt
- JE = Junior exempt
- JR = Junior Accelerator Programme entrant
- CO = College Accelerator Programme entrant
- NG = Next Gen Accelerator Program entrant
- w/o = Walkover
- r = Retired
- d = Defaulted

=== Draw ===
First round
1	(United States) L Raymond (Australia) R Stubbs	4	4
Q	(Lithuania) L Stančiūtė (Hungary) Á Szávay	6	6
(Ukraine) K Bondarenko (Ukraine) V Bondarenko	6	5	1
WC	(Russia) A Chakvetadze (Turkey) P Özgen	4	7	6
4	(Spain) M Marrero (Italy) An Serra Zanetti	7^{9}	7^{7}
(Israel) S Pe'er (United States) M Washington	6^{7}	6^{3}
(Latvia) L Dekmeijere (Japan) N Miyagi	0	3
(Italy) G Casoni (Czech Republic) V Uhlířová	6	6
(Austria) D Klemenschits (Austria) S Klemenschits	3	7	6
(Ukraine) A Bondarenko (Ukraine) Y Fedak	6	5	3
(Belarus) N Ostrovskaya (Russia) T Panova	2	6	3
3	(Switzerland) E Gagliardi (Turkey) İ Şenoğlu	6	1	6
(Germany) A-L Grönefeld (Republic of Ireland) K Liggan	6	6^{8}	0
(Russia) N Bratchikova (Russia) E Vesnina	2	7^{10}	6
(United Kingdom) C Curran (Netherlands) K Kilsdonk	6	7^{8}
2	(United States) J Craybas (United States) J Russell	4	6^{6}

Quarterfinals
Q	(Lithuania) L Stančiūtė (Hungary) Á Szávay	7^{11}	2	6
WC	(Russia) A Chakvetadze (Turkey) P Özgen	6^{9}	6	2
4	(Spain) M Marrero (Italy) An Serra Zanetti	6	6
(Italy) G Casoni (Czech Republic) V Uhlířová	0	3
(Austria) D Klemenschits (Austria) S Klemenschits	2	6	7
3	(Switzerland) E Gagliardi (Turkey) İ Şenoğlu	6	1	5
(Russia) N Bratchikova (Russia) E Vesnina	6	5	3
(United Kingdom) C Curran (Netherlands) K Kilsdonk	3	7	6

Semifinals
Q	(Lithuania) L Stančiūtė (Hungary) Á Szávay	4	3
4	(Spain) M Marrero (Italy) An Serra Zanetti	6	6
(Austria) D Klemenschits (Austria) S Klemenschits	6	6
(United Kingdom) C Curran (Netherlands) K Kilsdonk	3	3

Final
4	(Spain) M Marrero (Italy) An Serra Zanetti	6	6
(Austria) D Klemenschits (Austria) S Klemenschits	4	0
