= 2007 İstanbul Cup – Doubles =

Doubles
- 2007 İstanbul Cup

Final
- Champions: (Poland) Agnieszka Radwańska (Poland) Urszula Radwańska
- Runners-up: (Chinese Taipei) Chan Yung-jan (India) Sania Mirza
- Score: 6–1, 6–3

Details
- Draw: 16
- Seeds: 4

Events
Singles	Doubles
← 2006 ·	İstanbul Cup	· 2008 →

The 2007 İstanbul Cup – Doubles was an event of the 2007 İstanbul Cup women's tennis tournament and took place between 21 May and 26 May 2007 on outdoor clay courts in Istanbul, Turkey. Agnieszka and Urszula Radwańska won the title, defeating Chan Yung-jan and Sania Mirza in the final.

== Seeds ==
1. (Chinese Taipei) Chan Yung-jan / (India) Sania Mirza (finals)
2. (Croatia) Jelena Kostanić Tošić / (United States) Vania King (first round)
3. (Ukraine) Alona Bondarenko / (Ukraine) Kateryna Bondarenko (first round)
4. (Germany) Anna-Lena Grönefeld / (Turkey) İpek Şenoğlu (quarterfinals)

== Draw ==
Key

- Q = Qualifier
- WC = Wild card
- LL = Lucky loser
- Alt = Alternate
- ITF = ITF entry
- PR = Protected ranking
- SR = Special ranking
- SE = Special exempt
- JE = Junior exempt
- JR = Junior Accelerator Programme entrant
- CO = College Accelerator Programme entrant
- NG = Next Gen Accelerator Program entrant
- w/o = Walkover
- r = Retired
- d = Defaulted

First round
1	(Chinese Taipei) Y-j Chan (India) S Mirza	6	6
(Romania) S Cîrstea (Romania) Á Szatmári	3	1
(Germany) S Klösel (Greece) A Koumantou	4	6	[10]
(Italy) S Menna (Ukraine) K Polunina	6	4	[8]
4	(Germany) A-L Grönefeld (Turkey) İ Şenoğlu	3	6	[3]
(Romania) M Buzărnescu (Belarus) E Dzehalevich	6	3	[10]
WC	(Turkey) C Büyükakçay (Turkey) P Özgen	3	5
(Bosnia and Herzegovina) M Jugić-Salkić (Italy) R Oprandi	6	7
(Colombia) C Castaño (United States) N Uberoi	5	6	[10]
(Russia) E Afinogenova (Georgia (country)) A Tatishvili	7	3	[3]
(Poland) A Radwańska (Poland) U Radwańska	6	6
3	(Ukraine) A Bondarenko (Ukraine) K Bondarenko	4	1
(Russia) E Bychkova (Israel) T Obziler	3	6	[8]
(Belarus) T Poutchek (Belarus) A Yakimova	6	2	[10]
(Australia) C Dellacqua (Australia) C Horiatoupolos	w	/	o
2	(Croatia) J Kostanić Tošić (United States) V King

Quarterfinals
1	(Chinese Taipei) Y-j Chan (India) S Mirza	2	6	[10]
(Germany) S Klösel (Greece) A Koumantou	6	1	[7]
(Romania) M Buzărnescu (Belarus) E Dzehalevich	5	5
(Bosnia and Herzegovina) M Jugić-Salkić (Italy) R Oprandi	7	7
(Colombia) C Castaño (United States) N Uberoi
(Poland) A Radwańska (Poland) U Radwańska	w	/	o
(Belarus) T Poutchek (Belarus) A Yakimova	6	6
(Australia) C Dellacqua (Australia) C Horiatopoulos	4	2

Semifinals
1	(Chinese Taipei) Y-j Chan (India) S Mirza	6^{3}	6	[10]
(Bosnia and Herzegovina) M Jugić-Salkić (Italy) R Oprandi	7^{7}	0	[5]
(Poland) A Radwańska (Poland) U Radwańska	6	6
(Belarus) T Poutchek (Belarus) A Yakimova	0	2

Finals
1	(Chinese Taipei) Y-j Chan (India) S Mirza	1	3
(Poland) A Radwańska (Poland) U Radwańska	6	6
