= 2007 İstanbul Cup =

- Date: 21–26 May
- Edition: 3rd
- Category: WTA Tier III
- Draw: 30S / 16D
- Prize money: $200,000
- Surface: Clay / outdoor
- Location: Istanbul, Turkey

Champions

Singles
- (Russia) Elena Dementieva

Doubles
- (Poland) Agnieszka Radwańska / (Poland) Urszula Radwańska
← 2006 ·	İstanbul Cup	· 2008 →

The 2007 İstanbul Cup was a women's tennis tournament played on indoor carpet courts. It was the third edition of the İstanbul Cup, and was part of the Tier III category of the 2007 WTA Tour. It was held in Istanbul from 21 through 26 May 2007. Second-seeded Elena Dementieva won the singles title.

== Finals ==
=== Singles ===
(Russia) Elena Dementieva defeated (France) Aravane Rezaï, 7–6^{(7–5)}, 3–0 ret.

=== Doubles ===
(Poland) Agnieszka Radwańska / (Poland) Urszula Radwańska defeated (Chinese Taipei) Yung-Jan Chan / (India) Sania Mirza, 6–1, 6–3

== Points and prize money ==
=== Point distribution ===
Event	W	F	SF	QF	Round of 16	Round of 32	Q3	Q2	Q1
Singles	140	100	65	35	20	1	5	3	1
Doubles	140	100	65	35	1	—	—	—	—

=== Prize money ===
Event	W	F	SF	QF	Round of 16	Round of 32	Q3	Q2	Q1
Singles	$28,180	$15,190	$8,170	$4,385	$2,360	$1,270	$680	$370	$195
Doubles *	$8,460	$4,530	$2,425	$1,300	$700	—	—	—	—

_{* per team}

== Singles main-draw entrants ==
=== Seeds ===
Country	Player	Rank	Seed
RUS	Maria Sharapova	2	1
RUS	Elena Dementieva	13	2
SUI	Patty Schnyder	17	3
USA	Venus Williams	22	4
UKR	Alona Bondarenko	28	5
GER	Anna-Lena Grönefeld	40	6
POL	Agnieszka Radwańska	46	7
IND	Sania Mirza	51	8

=== Other entrants ===
The following players received wildcards into the singles main draw:

- (Turkey) Pemra Özgen
- (Turkey) İpek Şenoğlu

The following players received entry from the qualifying draw:

- (Russia) Ekaterina Afinogenova
- (Latvia) Anastasija Sevastova
- (Belarus) Ekaterina Dzehalevich
- (Georgia (country)) Anna Tatishvili

=== Retirements ===
- (Switzerland) Patty Schnyder (left thigh strain)
- (France) Aravane Rezaï (left knee injury)

== Doubles main-draw entrants ==
=== Seeds ===
Country	Player	Country	Player	Rank	Seed
TPE	Chan Yung-jan	IND	Sania Mirza	59	1
USA	Vania King	CRO	Jelena Kostanić Tošić	71	2
UKR	Alona Bondarenko	UKR	Kateryna Bondarenko	119	3
GER	Anna-Lena Grönefeld	TUR	İpek Şenoğlu	196	4

=== Other entrants ===
The following pairs received wildcards into the doubles main draw:

- (Turkey) Çağla Büyükakçay / (Turkey) Pemra Özgen

=== Retirements ===
- (United States) Vania King (low back strain)
- (Colombia) Catalina Castaño (left thigh strain)
