= Anna Bastrikova =

Russian tennis player

- Country (sports): Russia
- Born: 15 November 1985 (age 39); Moscow, Soviet Union
- Turned pro: 2000
- Plays: Right-handed (two-handed backhand)
- Prize money: $52,647

Singles
- Career record: 129–81
- Career titles: 2 ITF
- Highest ranking: No. 301 (4 November 2002)

Doubles
- Career record: 92–48
- Career titles: 8 ITF
- Highest ranking: No. 201 (2 May 2005)

Anna Bastrikova (born 15 November 1985) is a Russian former tennis player.

In her career, she won two singles and eight doubles titles on the ITF Women's Circuit. On 4 November 2002, she reached her career-high singles ranking of world No. 301. On 2 May 2005, she peaked at No. 201 in the doubles rankings.

Bastrikova made her WTA Tour main-draw debut at the Tashkent Open in the doubles event partnering Yuliana Fedak.

== ITF finals ==
=== Singles (2–6) ===
Legend $50,000 tournaments $25,000 tournaments $10,000 tournaments	Finals by surface Hard (1–1) Clay (0–3) Carpet (1–2)

Result	No.	Date	Location	Surface	Opponent	Score
Loss	1.	5 November 2000	Minsk, Belarus	Carpet (i)	(Belarus) Elena Yaryshka	1–4, 3–5, 1–4
Loss	2.	11 May 2001	Nitra, Slovakia	Clay	(Switzerland) Myriam Casanova	1–6, 3–6
Win	1.	29 October 2001	Minsk, Belarus	Carpet (i)	(Lithuania) Edita Liachovičiūtė	6–1, 6–2
Loss	3.	27 October 2002	Opole, Poland	Carpet (i)	(Belarus) Olga Barabanschikova	6–2, 3–6, 3–6
Loss	4.	20 January 2003	Hull, Great Britain	Hard (i)	(United Kingdom) Amanda Keen	3–6, 1–6
Win	2.	17 May 2005	Mazatlán, Mexico	Hard	(United States) Lauren Barnikow	6–4, 7–6^{(7–4)}
Loss	5.	28 June 2005	Galati, Romania	Clay	(Romania) Corina Corduneanu	w/o
Loss	6.	19 July 2005	Bucharest, Romania	Clay	(Romania) Raluca Olaru	3–6, 2–6

=== Doubles (8–9) ===
Legend $75,000 tournaments $50,000 tournaments $25,000 tournaments $10,000 tournaments	Finals by surface Hard (1–6) Clay (6–2) Carpet (1–1)

Outcome	No.	Date	Tournament	Surface	Partner	Opponents	Score
Winner	1.	21 May 2001	ITF Sofia, Bulgaria	Clay	(Russia) Maria Goloviznina	(Slovakia) Lenka Dlhopolcová (Slovakia) Ľubomíra Kurhajcová	6–3, 3–6, 6–2
Winner	2.	29 October 2001	Minsk, Belarus	Carpet (i)	(Russia) Vera Dushevina	(Belarus) Darya Kustova (Belarus) Tatsiana Uvarova	7–5, 3–6, 6–0
Runner-up	1.	26 February 2002	ITF Buchen, Germany	Carpet (i)	(Germany) Claudia Kardys	(Sweden) Sofia Arvidsson (Luxembourg) Claudine Schaul	0–6, 5–7
Winner	3.	19 May 2003	ITF Lviv, Ukraine	Clay	(Ukraine) Anna Zaporozhanova	(Ukraine) Mariya Koryttseva (France) Iryna Brémond	6–4, 6–4
Winner	4.	11 August 2003	ITF Bucharest, Romania	Clay	(Russia) Elena Vesnina	(Romania) Gabriela Niculescu (Romania) Monica Niculescu	6–4, 6–4
Winner	5.	17 August 2003	ITF Bucharest, Romania	Clay	(Russia) Elena Vesnina	(Italy) Nicole Clerico (Russia) Irina Smirnova	6–1, 6–1
Runner-up	2.	20 January 2004	ITF Hull, Great Britain	Hard (i)	(Russia) Vasilisa Davydova	(Republic of Ireland) Claire Curran (South Africa) Surina De Beer	0–6, 4–6
Winner	6.	14 April 2004	ITF Bol, Croatia	Clay	(Russia) Alla Kudryavtseva	(Belarus) Victoria Azarenka (Belarus) Olga Govortsova	6–4, 6–1
Runner-up	3.	30 May 2004	ITF Tongliao, China	Hard	(Russia) Nina Bratchikova	(Latvia) Līga Dekmeijere (Turkey) İpek Şenoğlu	5–7, 6–7^{(5–7)}
Runner-up	4.	21 September 2004	Batumi Ladies Open, Georgia	Hard (i)	(Russia) Irina Kotkina	(Ukraine) Alona Bondarenko (Russia) Galina Fokina	2–6, 2–6
Runner-up	5.	25 January 2005	ITF Clearwater, United States	Hard	(Belarus) Natallia Dziamidzenka	(United States) Lauren Fisher (United States) Amanda Johnson	6–4, 4–6, 3–6
Runner-up	6.	14 February 2005	Midland Tennis Classic, United States	Hard	(France) Iryna Brémond	(Ukraine) Yuliya Beygelzimer (United States) Kelly McCain	2–6, 4–6
Winner	7.	4 July 2005	ITF Krasnoarmeysk, Russia	Hard	(Russia) Julia Efremova	(Russia) Ekaterina Lopes (Russia) Elena Chalova	6–2, 7–6^{(7–3)}
Runner-up	7.	25 July 2005	ITF Arad, Romania	Clay	(Russia) Vasilisa Davydova	(Romania) Corina Corduneanu (Romania) Raluca Olaru	1–6, 4–6
Runner-up	8.	8 August 2005	ITF Moscow, Russia	Clay	(Russia) Vasilisa Davydova	(Russia) Ekaterina Lopes (Russia) Olga Panova	5–7, 3–6
Winner	8.	29 August 2005	ITF Balashikha, Russia	Clay	(Russia) Nina Bratchikova	(Russia) Ekaterina Lopes (Russia) Olga Panova	6–2, 6–2
Runner-up	9.	27 September 2005	Batumi Ladies Open, Georgia	Hard (i)	(Russia) Nina Bratchikova	(Belarus) Nadejda Ostrovskaya (Belarus) Anastasiya Yakimova	6–2, 2–6, 6–7^{(9–11)}

== Junior Grand Slam finals ==
=== Girls' doubles ===
Outcome	Year	Championship	Surface	Partner	Opponents	Score
Runner-up	2001	Australian Open	Hard	(Russia) Svetlana Kuznetsova	(Czech Republic) Petra Cetkovská (Czech Republic) Barbora Strýcová	6–7^{(3–7)}, 6–1, 4–6
