= 2001 French Open =

- Date: 28 May – 10 June 2001
- Edition: 100
- Category: 71st Grand Slam (ITF)
- Surface: Clay
- Location: Paris (XVI^{e}), France
- Venue: Stade Roland Garros

Champions

Men's singles
- (Brazil) Gustavo Kuerten

Women's singles
- (United States) Jennifer Capriati

Men's doubles
- (India) Leander Paes / (India) Mahesh Bhupathi

Women's doubles
- (Spain) Virginia Ruano Pascual / (Argentina) Paola Suárez

Mixed doubles
- (Spain) Virginia Ruano Pascual / (Spain) Tomás Carbonell
- French Open

The 2001 French Open was the second Grand Slam event of 2001 and the 100th edition of the French Open. It took place at the Stade Roland Garros in Paris, France, from late May through early June, 2001.

== Seniors ==
=== Men's singles ===
(Brazil) Gustavo Kuerten defeated (Spain) Àlex Corretja, 6–7^{(3–7)}, 7–5, 6–2, 6–0

- It was Kuerten's 4th title of the year, and his 14th overall. It was his 3rd (and last) career Grand Slam title, and his 3rd French Open title.

=== Women's singles ===
(United States) Jennifer Capriati defeated (Belgium) Kim Clijsters, 1–6, 6–4, 12–10

- It was Capriati's 3rd title of the year, and her 12th overall. It was her 2nd career Grand Slam title, and her 1st French Open title.

=== Men's doubles ===
(India) Leander Paes / (India) Mahesh Bhupathi defeated (Czech Republic) Petr Pála / (Czech Republic) Pavel Vízner, 7–6^{(7–5)}, 6–3

=== Women's doubles ===
(Spain) Virginia Ruano Pascual / (Argentina) Paola Suárez defeated (Federal Republic of Yugoslavia) Jelena Dokic / (Spain) Conchita Martínez, 6–2, 6–1

=== Mixed doubles ===
(Spain) Virginia Ruano Pascual / (Spain) Tomás Carbonell defeated (Argentina) Paola Suárez / (Brazil) Jaime Oncins, 7–5, 6–3

== Juniors ==
=== Boys' singles ===
(Spain) Carlos Cuadrado defeated (Argentina) Brian Dabul, 6–1, 6–0

=== Girls' singles ===
(Estonia) Kaia Kanepi defeated (Russia) Svetlana Kuznetsova, 6–3, 1–6, 6–2

=== Boys' doubles ===
(Colombia) Alejandro Falla / (Colombia) Carlos Salamanca defeated (Germany) Markus Bayer / (Germany) Philipp Petzschner, 3–6, 7–5, 6–4

=== Girls' doubles ===
(Czech Republic) Petra Cetkovská / (Czech Republic) Renata Voráčová defeated (Haiti) Neyssa Etienne / (Germany) Annette Kolb, 6–3, 3–6, 6–3

== Notes ==
Preceded by 2001 Australian Open	Grand Slams	Succeeded by 2001 Wimbledon Championships
