= Neyssa Etienne =

Haitian tennis player (born 1983)

- Country (sports): Haiti
- Born: 31 October 1983 (age 42) Port-au-Prince, Haiti
- Turned pro: 1999
- Retired: 2009
- Plays: Right-handed (two-handed backhand)
- Prize money: $9,674

Singles
- Career record: 40–21
- Career titles: 1 ITF
- Highest ranking: No. 397 (15 September 2003)

Grand Slam singles results
- French Open Junior: 2R (2001)
- Wimbledon Junior: 1R (2001)
- US Open Junior: QF (2001)

Other tournaments
- Olympic Games: 1R (2000)

Doubles
- Career record: 25–13
- Career titles: 2 ITF
- Highest ranking: No. 492 (7 October 2002)

Grand Slam doubles results
- French Open Junior: F (2001)
- Wimbledon Junior: 2R (2001)
- US Open Junior: QF (2001)
Medal record
Representing Haiti
Central American and Caribbean Games
Bronze medal – third place	2002 San Salvador	Mixed

Neyssa Etienne (born 31 October, 1983) is a retired Haitian professional tennis player who represented Haiti in international competitions, including the 2000 Summer Olympics in Sydney. She competed on the ITF Women’s Circuit, played collegiate tennis in the United States, and is noted as one of Haiti’s leading female tennis players.

== Early life and junior career ==
Etienne was born in Port-au-Prince, Haiti, and began playing tennis at a young age. She developed as a promising junior player, achieving a career-high ITF junior ranking of world No. 25 in singles and No. 5 in doubles in 2001, and reached the quarterfinals of the 2001 US Open juniors. Over the course of her junior career, she won five ITF junior singles titles and 14 ITF junior doubles titles, and compiled a career win–loss record of 186–87.

== College tennis ==
Etienne attended the University of South Florida, where she competed for the USF Bulls women’s tennis team from 2003 to 2006. After navigating eligibility issues with the NCAA, she emerged as the team’s No. 1 singles player and was a key contributor in both singles and doubles play during her collegiate career.

== Professional career ==
Etienne turned professional in 1999. On the ITF Women’s Circuit, she won one singles title and two doubles titles, and reached her highest WTA singles ranking of world No. 397 on September 15, 2003, and a top doubles ranking of No. 492 on October 7, 2002.

She represented Haiti in the women’s singles tennis event at the 2000 Summer Olympics in Sydney, where she lost in the first round. Etienne also competed for Haiti in the Billie Jean King Cup (formerly Fed Cup) and is credited with an 8–5 win–loss record for her country (Haiti Billie Jean King Cup team).

== ITF Circuit finals ==
=== Singles: 4 (1 title, 3 runner-ups) ===
Legend $100,000 tournaments $75,000 tournaments $50,000 tournaments $25,000 tournaments $10,000 tournaments	Finals by surface Hard (0–1) Clay (1–2) Grass (0–0) Carpet (0–0)

Result	No.	Date	Tournament	Surface	Opponent	Score
Loss	1.	7 October 2001	ITF Aventura, United States	Clay	(Hungary) Melinda Czink	4–6, 3–6
Win	1.	22 September 2002	ITF Greenville, United States	Clay	(Poland) Agata Cioroch	7–5, 6–3
Loss	2.	29 September 2002	ITF Raleigh, United States	Clay	(United States) Julie Ditty	5–7, 6–3, 4–6
Loss	3.	27 July 2003	ITF Evansville, United States	Hard	(United States) Stephanie Hazlett	4–6, 3–6

=== Doubles: 4 (2 titles, 2 runner-ups) ===
Legend $100,000 tournaments $75,000 tournaments $50,000 tournaments $25,000 tournaments $10,000 tournaments	Finals by surface Hard (2–1) Clay (0–1) Grass (0–0) Carpet (0–0)

Result	No.	Date	Tournament	Surface	Partner	Opponents	Score
Loss	1.	7 October 2001	ITF Aventura, United States	Clay	(Russia) Ekaterina Afinogenova	(United States) Milangela Morales (United States) Shenay Perry	w/o
Loss	2.	27 January 2002	ITF Miami, United States	Hard	(Hungary) Melinda Czink	(United States) Stephanie Mabry (United States) Karin Miller	4–6, 7–6^{(7–5)}, 2–6
Win	1.	7 July 2002	ITF Waco, United States	Hard	(Israel) Marina Bernshtein	(United States) Michelle Dasso (United States) Julie Ditty	6–4, 4–6, 6–4
Win	2.	20 July 2003	ITF Baltimore, United States	Hard	(South Africa) Surina De Beer	(Japan) Tomoko Taira (Japan) Mayumi Yamamoto	7–5, 6–1

== Junior Grand Slam finals ==
=== Girls' doubles: 1 (runner-up) ===
Result	Year	Tournament	Surface	Partner	Opponents	Score
Loss	2001	French Open	Clay	(Germany) Annette Kolb	(Czech Republic) Petra Cetkovská (Czech Republic) Renata Voráčová	3–6, 6–3, 3–6
