= Stephanie Hazlett =

American tennis player (born 1979)

- Country (sports): United States
- Born: January 29, 1979 (age 47)
- Height: 5 ft 6 in (168 cm)
- Plays: Right-handed
- Prize money: $14,604

Singles
- Career titles: 1 ITF
- Highest ranking: No. 283 (February 16, 2004)

Doubles
- Career titles: 2 ITF
- Highest ranking: No. 306 (February 9, 2004)

Stephanie Hazlett (born January 29, 1979) is an American former professional tennis player.

A native of Indiana, Hazlett attended Heritage Hills H.S. and in 1996 secured the school's first state championship across all sports, by winning the girls' singles tournament. Her junior tennis career included an Easter Bowl title in 1995 for the 16s age group. She played collegiate tennis for the University of Florida and was a two-time All-American.

Hazlett reached a best singles world ranking of 283 on the professional tour. In 2003 she won her first ITF Circuit event in Evansville, Indiana, a tournament that her mother Anna was involved in running. She also won a $25,000 ITF tournament in Puebla, Mexico later that year, partnering Kaysie Smashey in the doubles.

== ITF Circuit finals ==
Legend
$25,000 tournaments
$10,000 tournaments

=== Singles: 2 (1–1) ===
Outcome	Date	Tournament	Surface	Opponent	Score
Runner-up	Jul 2000	ITF Evansville, United States	Hard	Kelly McCain	3–6, 4–6
Winner	Jul 2003	ITF Evansville, United States	Hard	Neyssa Etienne	6–4, 6–3

=== Doubles: 3 (2–1) ===
Outcome	Date	Tournament	Surface	Partner	Opponents	Score
Winner	Jun 2003	ITF Dallas, United States	Hard	Julia Scaringe	Surina De Beer; Ilke Gers	6–2, 6–1
Runner-up	Jul 2003	ITF Evansville, United States	Hard	Julia Scaringe	Tamara Encina; Alison Ojeda	6–4, 4–6, 3–6
Winner	Nov 2003	ITF Puebla, Mexico	Hard	Kaysie Smashey	Tiffany Dabek; Dimana Krastevitch	6–1, 7–5
