= Surina De Beer =

South African tennis player

- Country (sports): South Africa
- Residence: Pretoria
- Born: 28 June 1978 (age 48) Pretoria, South Africa
- Turned pro: 1998
- Retired: 2011
- Plays: Right-handed (two-handed backhand)
- Prize money: $247,569

Singles
- Career record: 264–183
- Career titles: 11 ITF
- Highest ranking: No. 116 (6 July 1998)

Grand Slam singles results
- Australian Open: Q2 (1999)
- French Open: Q2 (1998, 1999)
- Wimbledon: 3R (1998)
- US Open: Q3 (1998, 1999)

Doubles
- Career record: 285–133
- Career titles: 36 ITF
- Highest ranking: No. 49 (25 September 2000)

Grand Slam doubles results
- Australian Open: 2R (2000)
- French Open: 2R (2000)
- Wimbledon: 2R (2000)
- US Open: 2R (2000)

Team competitions
- Fed Cup: 5–4

Surina De Beer (born 28 June 1978) is a retired South African tennis player.

In her career, De Beer won eleven singles titles and 36 doubles titles on the ITF Women's Circuit. On 6 July 1998, she reached her best singles ranking of world No. 116. On 25 September 2000, she peaked at No. 49 in the WTA doubles rankings.

In 2011, De Beer retired from professional tennis.

== ITF Circuit finals ==
=== Singles (11–6) ===
| Legend $75,000 tournaments $50,000 tournaments $25,000 tournaments $10,000 tournaments | Finals by surface Hard (4–2) Clay (1–0) Grass (4–4) Carpet (2–0) |

| Result | Date | Tournament | Surface | Opponent | Score |
|---|---|---|---|---|---|
| Loss | 15 July 1996 | Frinton, UK | Grass | (United States) Pam Nelson | 3–6, 4–6 |
| Win | 19 July 1996 | Ilkley, UK | Grass | (Australia) Cindy Watson | 6–4, 7–6^{(7–5)} |
| Loss | 12 July 1997 | Felixstowe, UK | Grass | (United Kingdom) Karen Cross | 1–6, 5–7 |
| Win | 19 July 1997 | Frinton, UK | Grass | (South Africa) Mareze Joubert | 6–4, 6–4 |
| Win | 27 July 1997 | Dublin, Ireland | Carpet | (Austria) Patricia Wartusch | 6–4, 3–6, 7–6^{(7–2)} |
| Win | 2 August 1997 | Ilkley, UK | Grass | (Russia) Julia Lutrova | 7–5, 6–1 |
| Loss | 15 September 1997 | Ibaraki, Japan | Hard | (Australia) Kylie Moulds | 6–2, 5–7, 3–6 |
| Win | 5 October 1997 | Kyoto, Japan | Carpet (i) | (United States) Aurandrea Narvaez | 6–2, 7–6^{(7–4)} |
| Win | 12 October 1997 | Saga, Japan | Grass | (Japan) Shinobu Asagoe | 6–1, 5–7, 6–3 |
| Loss | 24 May 1999 | Surbiton Trophy, UK | Grass | (Thailand) Tamarine Tanasugarn | 4–6, 7–5, 2–6 |
| Win | 11 April 2005 | Porto Santo Island, Portugal | Hard | (Germany) Laura Zelder | 6–4, 6–3 |
| Win | 18 April 2005 | Porto Santo Island, Portugal | Hard | (Germany) Annette Kolb | 6–0, 6–1 |
| Loss | 23 May 2005 | Oxford, UK | Grass | (United Kingdom) Rebecca Llewellyn | 6–0, 3–6, 3–6 |
| Win | 23 October 2006 | Pretoria, South Africa | Hard | (South Africa) Monica Gorny | 6–2, 6–3 |
| Win | 8 May 2007 | Edinburgh, UK | Clay | (Italy) Alice Balducci | 6–2, 6–2 |
| Win | 27 October 2008 | Pretoria, South Africa | Hard | (South Africa) Chanel Simmonds | 6–3, 6–3 |
| Loss | 16 May 2011 | Durban, South Africa | Hard | (Czech Republic) Kateřina Kramperová | 2–6, 0–6 |

=== Doubles (36–24) ===
| Legend $75,000 tournaments $50,000 tournaments $25,000 tournaments $10,000 tournaments | Finals by surface Hard (27–16) Clay (2–4) Grass (3–2) Carpet (4–2) |

| Result | Date | Tournament | Surface | Partner | Opponents | Score |
|---|---|---|---|---|---|---|
| Loss | 4 October 1993 | Pretoria, South Africa | Hard | (South Africa) Karen van der Merwe | (South Africa) Liezel Horn (South Africa) Rene Mentz | 6–7^{(4–7)}, 5–7 |
| Loss | 26 February 1996 | Pretoria, South Africa | Hard | (Malaysia) Khoo Chin-bee | (United Kingdom) Heather Matthews (United Kingdom) Sara Tse | 6–2, 6–7^{(4–7)}, 3–6 |
| Loss | 4 March 1996 | Gaborone, Botswana | Hard | (Malaysia) Khoo Chin-bee | (United States) Audra Brannon (United States) Dana Evans | 4–6, 5–7 |
| Win | 8 July 1996 | Felixstowe, UK | Grass | (United Kingdom) Katia Roubanova | (United Kingdom) Lucie Ahl (United Kingdom) Shirli-Ann Siddall | 6–2, 6–4 |
| Win | 29 July 1996 | Ilkley, UK | Grass | (United Kingdom) Katia Roubanova | (United Kingdom) Lucie Ahl (United Kingdom) Shirli-Ann Siddall | 6–1, 6–7^{(4–7)}, 6–3 |
| Win | 8 July 1997 | Felixstowe, UK | Grass | (United Kingdom) Lizzie Jelfs | (United Kingdom) Helen Crook (United Kingdom) Victoria Davies | 7–5, 7–5 |
| Win | 26 July 1997 | Dublin, Ireland | Carpet | (United Kingdom) Lizzie Jelfs | (United States) Amanda Augustus (Australia) Amy Jensen | 6–3, 4–6, 6–4 |
| Win | 15 September 1997 | Ibaraki, Japan | Hard | (Japan) Nami Urabe | (Japan) Riei Kawamata (Japan) Yoshiko Sasano | 6–2, 6–3 |
| Win | 22 September 1997 | Ibaraki, Japan | Hard | (Japan) Nami Urabe | (Japan) Shizu Katsumi (Japan) Kyoko Kojima | 6–3, 6–3 |
| Win | 5 October 1997 | Kyoto, Japan | Carpet (i) | (Japan) Nami Urabe | (Japan) Yumiko Kitamura (Japan) Natsumi Yuki | 6–2, 6–3 |
| Loss | 10 October 1997 | Saga, Japan | Grass | (Japan) Nami Urabe | (Australia) Danielle Jones (Japan) Saori Obata | 3–6, 4–6 |
| Win | 6 March 1998 | Rockford, United States | Hard (i) | (United States) Lindsay Lee-Waters | (Georgia (country)) Nino Louarsabishvili (Netherlands) Seda Noorlander | 6–2, 6–4 |
| Loss | 16 May 1998 | Porto, Portugal | Clay | (United States) Rebecca Jensen | (Belgium) Nancy Feber (Slovenia) Katarina Srebotnik | 7–5, 1–6, 4–6 |
| Loss | 6 February 1999 | Sheffield, UK | Hard (i) | (Netherlands) Kim de Weille | (United Kingdom) Lizzie Jelfs (United Kingdom) Lorna Woodroffe | 6–3, 4–6, 3–6 |
| Win | 13 February 1999 | Birmingham, UK | Hard (i) | (Netherlands) Kim de Weille | (Germany) Angelika Bachmann (Romania) Magda Mihalache | 6–4, 6–1 |
| Loss | 8 May 1999 | Athens, Greece | Clay | (Romania) Magda Mihalache | (Australia) Evie Dominikovic (Australia) Bryanne Stewart | 5–7, 4–6 |
| Loss | 15 May 1999 | Edinburgh, UK | Clay | (United Kingdom) Lorna Woodroffe | (Tunisia) Selima Sfar (United Kingdom) Joanne Ward | 4–6, 2–6 |
| Win | 24 July 1999 | Dublin, Ireland | Carpet | (Israel) Tzipora Obziler | (United Kingdom) Hannah Collin (Slovenia) Tina Hergold | 7–5, 4–6, 6–2 |
| Win | 21 August 1999 | Bronx Open, US | Hard | (Japan) Nana Smith | (Netherlands) Seda Noorlander (Austria) Patricia Wartusch | 3–6, 6–0, 6–3 |
| Win | 25 September 1999 | Thessaloniki, Greece | Carpet | (Greece) Eleni Daniilidou | (Germany) Adriana Barna (Hungary) Adrienn Hegedűs | 6–2, 6–3 |
| Loss | 9 October 1999 | Batumi Ladies Open, Georgia | Carpet | (Romania) Cătălina Cristea | (Romania) Magda Mihalache (Slovakia) Zuzana Váleková | 4–6, 6–3, 4–6 |
| Loss | 19 February 2000 | Midland Classic, US | Hard (i) | (Israel) Tzipora Obziler | (South Africa) Nannie de Villiers (Japan) Rika Hiraki | 1–6, 6–1, 1–6 |
| Loss | 6 May 2000 | Kangaroo Cup, Japan | Carpet | (South Africa) Nannie de Villiers | (Japan) Shinobu Asagoe (Japan) Yuka Yoshida | 3–6, 1–6 |
| Win | 19 August 2000 | Bronx Open, US | Hard | (Japan) Nana Smith | (France) Alexandra Fusai (France) Émilie Loit | 5–7, 6–4, 6–4 |
| Win | 28 October 2000 | Seoul, South Korea | Hard | (Germany) Marlene Weingärtner | (South Korea) Cho Yoon-jeong (South Korea) Jeon Mi-ra | 4–2, 4–1, 1–4, 3–5, 4–2 |
| Win | 14 June 2003 | Allentown, US | Hard | (New Zealand) Ilke Gers | (United States) Adria Engel (United States) Kelly McCain | 6–7^{(4–7)}, 6–3, 6–3 |
| Loss | 21 June 2003 | Dallas, US | Hard | (New Zealand) Ilke Gers | (United States) Stephanie Hazlett (United States) Julia Scaringe | 2–6, 1–6 |
| Win | 19 July 2003 | Baltimore, US | Hard | (Haiti) Neyssa Etienne | (Japan) Tomoko Taira (Japan) Mayumi Yamamoto | 7–5, 6–1 |
| Win | 2 August 2003 | Harrisonburg, US | Hard | (Germany) Martina Müller | (Brazil) Ana Maria Moura (United States) Danielle Wiggins | 6–2, 7–6^{(7–4)} |
| Loss | 20 October 2003 | Cardiff, UK | Hard (i) | (New Zealand) Ilke Gers | (Republic of Ireland) Claire Curran (Turkey) İpek Şenoğlu | 4–6, 6–2, 3–6 |
| Win | 24 January 2004 | Hull, UK | Hard (i) | (Republic of Ireland) Claire Curran | (Russia) Anna Bastrikova (Russia) Vasilisa Davydova | 6–0, 6–4 |
| Loss | 6 June 2004 | Surbiton Trophy, UK | Grass | (Republic of Ireland) Karen Nugent | (New Zealand) Leanne Baker (Australia) Nicole Sewell | 6–2, 5–7, 6–7^{(6–8)} |
| Loss | 9 October 2004 | Lagos Open, Nigeria | Hard | (South Africa) Chanelle Scheepers | (New Zealand) Shelley Stephens (India) Sania Mirza | 1–6, 4–6 |
| Win | 16 October 2004 | Lagos Open, Nigeria | Hard | (South Africa) Chanelle Scheepers | (New Zealand) Shelley Stephens (India) Sania Mirza | 6–0, 6–0 |
| Win | 23 October 2004 | Lagos Open, Nigeria | Hard | (Jamaica) Alanna Broderick | (Israel) Yevgenia Savranska (Switzerland) Karin Schlapbach | 7–5, 6–2 |
| Loss | 30 October 2004 | Lagos Open, Nigeria | Hard | (Jamaica) Alanna Broderick | (Germany) Franziska Etzel (Austria) Jennifer Schmidt | 5–7, 2–6 |
| Win | 22 January 2005 | Tipton, UK | Hard (i) | (United Kingdom) Jane O'Donoghue | (United Kingdom) Katie O'Brien (United Kingdom) Melanie South | 6–4, 6–2 |
| Win | 3 April 2005 | GB Pro-Series Bath, UK | Hard (i) | (United Kingdom) Melanie South | (Russia) Ekaterina Kozhokina (Australia) Trudi Musgrave | 6–2, 7–5 |
| Loss | 16 April 2005 | Porto Santo Island, Portugal | Hard | (Netherlands) Lisanne Balk | (Argentina) María José Argeri (Brazil) Letícia Sobral | 4–6, 6–4, 6–7^{(13–15)} |
| Win | 23 April 2005 | Porto Santo Island, Portugal | Hard | (Netherlands) Lisanne Balk | (Germany) Mareike Biglmaier (Germany) Annette Kolb | 6–3, 3–6, 6–3 |
| Win | 13 May 2005 | Monzón, Spain | Hard | (Ukraine) Olena Antypina | (Czech Republic) Petra Cetkovská (Spain) Gabriela Velasco Andreu | 7–5, 7–5 |
| Win | 15 October 2005 | Lagos Open, Nigeria | Hard | (Spain) Gabriela Velasco Andreu | (Switzerland) Lisa Sabino (Slovenia) Maša Zec Peškirič | 6–4, 6–2 |
| Loss | 12 February 2006 | Sunderland, UK | Hard (i) | (Japan) Ayami Takase | (Netherlands) Kim Kilsdonk (Netherlands) Elise Tamaëla | 5–7, 4–6 |
| Loss | 18 February 2006 | Stockholm, Sweden | Hard (i) | (United Kingdom) Anne Keothavong | (Switzerland) Timea Bacsinszky (France) Aurélie Védy | 4–6, 4–6 |
| Win | 21 October 2006 | Lagos Open, Nigeria | Hard | (Romania) Ágnes Szatmári | (India) Sanaa Bhambri (India) Rushmi Chakravarthi | 6–3, 6–1 |
| Win | 29 October 2006 | Pretoria, South Africa | Hard | (France) Aurelie Caffa | (South Africa) Andrea Oates (South Africa) Bianca Swanepoel | 6–0, 6–2 |
| Loss | 24 June 2007 | Fort Worth, US | Hard | (United States) Robin Stephenson | (Slovakia) Dominika Diešková (United States) Courtney Nagle | 5–7, 3–6 |
| Win | 7 July 2007 | Southlake, US | Hard | (South Africa) Kim Grant | (Canada) Valérie Tétreault (Canada) Stéphanie Dubois | 4–6, 6–4, 6–4 |
| Win | 22 July 2007 | Hamilton, Canada | Clay | (Canada) Stéphanie Dubois | (Sweden) Michaela Johansson (Colombia) Paula Zabala | w/o |
| Win | 24 November 2007 | Mexico City, Mexico | Hard | (Paraguay) Rossana de los Ríos | (Mexico) Daniela Múñoz Gallegos (Mexico) Valeria Pulido | 6–3, 6–1 |
| Loss | 10 February 2008 | Midland Classic, US | Hard (i) | (Japan) Rika Fujiwara | (United States) Ashley Harkleroad (United States) Shenay Perry | 6–3, 4–6, [6–10] |
| Win | 15 June 2008 | El Paso, US | Hard | (United States) Lauren Albanese | (United States) Lindsay Lee-Waters (United States) Ashley Weinhold | 6–3, 6–3 |
| Win | 17 October 2008 | Lagos Open, Nigeria | Hard | (Romania) Ágnes Szatmári | (Belgium) Tamaryn Hendler (Switzerland) Lisa Sabino | 7–6^{(9–7)}, 6–3 |
| Loss | 31 October 2008 | Pretoria, South Africa | Hard | (South Africa) Lisa Marshall | (South Africa) Christi Potgieter (South Africa) Bianca Swanepoel | 3–6, 3–6 |
| Loss | 28 November 2008 | Saint-Denis, France | Hard | (Belgium) Tamaryn Hendler | (Germany) Carmen Klaschka (Germany) Laura Siegemund | 3–6, 1–6 |
| Win | 28 March 2009 | Hammond, US | Hard | (United States) Lilia Osterloh | (Chinese Taipei) Chan Chin-wei (United States) Tetiana Luzhanska | 6–4, 6–3 |
| Win | 19 March 2011 | Metepec, Mexico | Hard | (Indonesia) Romana Tedjakusuma | (Mexico) Nadia Abdalá (France) Virginie Ayassamy | 6–2, 6–4 |
| Win | 1 May 2011 | Bournemouth, UK | Clay | (United Kingdom) Francesca Stephenson | (Germany) Scarlett Werner (Germany) Alina Wessel | 6–2, 6–2 |
| Loss | 7 May 2011 | Edinburgh, UK | Clay | (Germany) Scarlett Werner | (United Kingdom) Jade Windley (United Kingdom) Samantha Murray | 5–7, 6–4, [8–10] |
| Win | 20 May 2011 | Durban, South Africa | Hard (i) | (United Kingdom) Jennifer Allan | (Denmark) Malou Ejdesgaard (Austria) Nicole Rottmann | 6–2, 4–6, [10–8] |
