= Annette Kolb (tennis) =

German tennis player

- Country (sports): Germany
- Born: 14 September 1983 (age 41); Ulm
- Turned pro: 1998
- Retired: 2007
- Plays: Right-handed (two-handed backhand)
- Prize money: $31,341

Singles
- Career record: 106–100
- Career titles: 0 WTA, 1 ITF
- Highest ranking: No. 344 (6 February 2006)

Grand Slam singles results
- Australian Open Junior: 2R (2001)
- French Open Junior: 1R (2001)
- Wimbledon Junior: 2R (2001)
- US Open Junior: 3R (2000)

Doubles
- Career record: 62–39
- Career titles: 0 WTA, 6 ITF
- Highest ranking: No. 242 (17 July 2006)

Grand Slam doubles results
- Australian Open Junior: 1R (2001)
- French Open Junior: F (2001)
- Wimbledon Junior: 2R (2001)
- US Open Junior: QF (2001)

Annette Kolb (born 14 September 1983) is a German former professional tennis player.

Kolb has won one singles and six doubles titles on the ITF Women's Circuit in her career. On 6 February 2006, she reached her best singles ranking of world No. 344. On 17 July 2006, she peaked at No. 242 in the doubles rankings. Kolb made her WTA Tour debut at the 2006 Banka Koper Slovenia Open. Kolb retirement from professional tennis 2007.

== Career ==
Kolb started playing tennis aged 7. On 2 January 2001, she reached her best singles junior ranking of world No. 42. On 12 December 2001, she peaked at No. 16 in the doubles rankings. She finished her junior career with a record of 82–68. Her biggest success was the final of the junior 2001 French Open in doubles. Together with Neyssa Etienne lost a Czech Petra Cetkovská and Renata Voráčová.

== Junior Grand Slam finals ==
=== Girls' doubles ===
Outcome	Year	Tournament	Surface	Partner	Opponents	Score
Runner-up	2001	French Open	Clay	(Haiti) Neyssa Etienne	(Czech Republic) Petra Cetkovská (Czech Republic) Renata Voráčová	3–6, 6–3, 3–6

== ITF finals ==
=== Singles: 5 (1–4) ===
Legend $100,000 tournaments $75,000 tournaments $50,000 tournaments $25,000 tournaments $10,000 tournaments	Finals by surface Hard (0–2) Clay (1–2) Grass (0–0) Carpet (0–0)

Outcome	No.	Date	Tournament	Surface	Opponent	Score
Winner	1.	30 April 2001	Florianópolis, Brazil	Clay	(Uruguay) Ana Lucía Migliarini de León	6–4, 5–7, 6–3
Runner-up	1.	7 April 2003	Antalya, Turkey	Clay	(Romania) Magda Mihalache	5–7, 1–6
Runner-up	2.	5 April 2004	Cairo, Egypt	Clay	(Czech Republic) Hana Šromová	w/o
Runner-up	3.	15 April 2005	Porto, Portugal	Hard	(South Africa) Surina De Beer	0–6, 1–6
Runner-up	4.	2 August 2005	Vigo, Spain	Hard	(Spain) María José Martínez Sánchez	7–6^{(7–5)}, 5–7, 6–7^{(4–7)}

=== Doubles: 14 (6–8) ===
$100,000 tournaments
$75,000 tournaments
$50,000 tournaments
$25,000 tournaments
$10,000 tournaments

Outcome	No.	Date	Tournament	Surface	Partner	Opponents	Score
Runner-up	1.	29 January 2001	Wellington, New Zealand	Hard	(Chinese Taipei) Hsieh Su-wei	(Australia) Donna Mc Intyre (New Zealand) Shelley Stephens	5–7, 6–0, 2–6
Winner	1.	29 July 2001	Horb, Germany	Clay	(Croatia) Ivana Zupa	(Slovakia) Zuzana Kučová (Slovakia) Martina Strussova	7–6^{(7–0)}, 6–2
Winner	2.	19 August 2002	Enschede, Netherlands	Clay	(Austria) Daniela Kix	(Austria) Daniela Klemenschits (Netherlands) Debby Haak	6–1, 7–5
Winner	3.	5 May 2003	Warsaw, Poland	Clay	(Germany) Tatjana Maria	(Czech Republic) Barbora Machovská (Czech Republic) Ivana Plateniková	6–3, 6–3
Runner-up	2.	5 April 2004	Cairo, Egypt	Clay	(Sweden) Helena Ejeson	(Czech Republic) Simona Dobrá (Czech Republic) Hana Šromová	w/o
Winner	4.	14 March 2005	Fuerteventura, Spain	Carpet	(Germany) Laura Zelder	(Spain) Núria Roig (Spain) Astrid Waernes	6–2, 4–6, 6–1
Runner-up	3.	4 April 2005	Porto, Portugal	Hard	(Germany) Laura Zelder	(Argentina) María José Argeri (Brazil) Letícia Sobral	6–7^{(6–8)}, 1–6
Runner-up	4.	18 April 2005	Porto, Portugal	Hard	(Germany) Mareike Biglmaier	(Netherlands) Lisanne Balk (South Africa) Surina De Beer	3–6, 6–3, 3–6
Runner-up	5.	28 May 2005	Phuket, Thailand	Hard	(Australia) Monique Adamczak	(Uzbekistan) Akgul Amanmuradova (Thailand) Napaporn Tongsalee	1–6, 1–6
Runner-up	6.	25 October 2005	Tokyo, Japan	Hard	(Australia) Lauren Breadmore	(Japan) Maki Arai (South Korea) Kim Hea-mi	4–6, 6–7^{(5–7)}
Winner	5.	13 May 2006	Monzón, Spain	Hard	(Australia) Monique Adamczak	(Poland) Olga Brózda (Israel) Yevgenia Savransky	7–5, 6–3
Winner	6.	19 May 2006	Tenerife, Spain	Hard	(Australia) Monique Adamczak	(Spain) Estrella Cabeza Candela (Venezuela) Laura Vallvaerdu-Zafra	4–6, 6–4, 6–1
Runner-up	7.	30 October 2006	Erding, Germany	Carpet (i)	(Germany) Carmen Klaschka	(Austria) Daniela Klemenschits (Austria) Sandra Klemenschits	6–1, 3–6, 2–6
Runner-up	8.	6 November 2006	Ismaning, Germany	Carpet (i)	(Germany) Sabrina Jolk	(Germany) Eva-Maria Hoch (Germany) Lydia Steinbach	2–6, 1–6

== ITF Junior finals ==
=== Singles ===
Legend
Junior Grand Slam
Category GA
Category G1
Category G2
Category G3
Category G4
Category G5

Result	Date	Tournament	Location	Surface	Opponent	Score
W	7 August 1998	ITF 18 & Under Tournament	Rushbrooke, Ireland	Carpet	(United Kingdom) Alice Barnes	6–2, 6–2
L	17 October 1999	15th Bahia Junior Cup	Bahia, Brazil	Clay	(Brazil) Livia Azzi	0–5 ret.

=== Doubles ===
Legend
Junior Grand Slam
Category GA
Category G1
Category G2
Category G3
Category G4
Category G5

Result	Date	Tournament	Location	Surface	Partner	Opponent	Score
L	7 August 1998	ITF 18 & Under Tournament	Rushbrooke, Ireland	Carpet	(United Kingdom) Natalie Neri	(United Kingdom) Alice Barnes (United Kingdom) Julia Smith	4–6, 3–6
L	14 February 1999	Auckland 18 & Under Summer Championships	Auckland, New Zealand	Hard	(New Zealand) Gorana Marsic	(Australia) Sarah Stone (Australia) Nicole Kriz	1–6, 2–6
L	17 October 1999	15th Bahia Junior Cup	Bahia, Brazil	Clay	(Germany) Jacqueline Frohlich	(Brazil) Livia Azzi (Brazil) Larissa Carvalho	3–6, 7–5, 0–6
W	24 October 1999	Londrina Junior Cup	Londrina, Brazil	Clay	(Germany) Jacqueline Frohlich	(Brazil) Marina Tavares (Brazil) Fernanda Luiz	1–6, 7–5, 6–1
L	20 May 2001	23rd Tourneo Internazionale Citta Di Santa Croce	Santa Croce, Italy	Clay	(Haiti) Neyssa Etienne	(Argentina) Gisela Dulko (France) Sylvia Montero	2–6, 6–2, 5–7
L	2 June 2001	37th Astrid Bowl	Loverval, Belgium	Clay	(Haiti) Neyssa Etienne	(United States) Bethanie Mattek (Australia) Christina Horiatopoulos	3–6, 6–7^{(3–7)}
L	10 June 2001	International Junior Championships of France	Paris, France	Clay	(Haiti) Neyssa Etienne	(Czech Republic) Petra Cetkovská (Czech Republic) Renata Voráčová	3–6, 6–3, 3–6
