= Ekaterina Afinogenova =

Russian tennis player

Ekaterina Afinogenova Екатерина Афиногенова
- Country (sports): Russia
- Born: 15 January 1987 (age 38)
- Turned pro: 2001
- Retired: 2016 (last match 2010 played)
- Plays: Right (two-handed backhand)
- Prize money: $54,881

Singles
- Career record: 137–130
- Career titles: 0
- Highest ranking: No. 219 (8 October 2007)

Grand Slam singles results
- US Open: Q1 (2007)

Doubles
- Career record: 27–37
- Career titles: 1 ITF
- Highest ranking: No. 273 (9 July 2007)

Ekaterina Afinogenova (Russian: Екатерина Афиногенова, born 15 January 1987) is a retired Russian tennis player.

She won one doubles title on the ITF Women's Circuit in her career. On 8 October 2007, she reached her best singles ranking of 219. On 9 July 2007, she peaked at No. 273 in the doubles rankings.

Afinogenova made her WTA Tour main-draw debut at the 2007 Istanbul Cup. Afinogenova played her last match in 2010, and officially retired from the sport in 2016.

== Tennis career ==
=== 2007 ===
She qualified for the main draw of the 2007 Istanbul Cup by defeating Kateryna Polunina, Casey Dellacqua and Mervana Jugić-Salkić. In the first round, she defeated German Sandra Klösel, but lost to Meghann Shaughnessy in the second.

In June, she participated in the WTA tournament of Barcelona in Spain endowed with $145,000 She qualified won German Carmen Klaschka and Georgian Margalita Chakhnashvili but lost in the final round against the Argentine María Emilia Salerni. In doubles, with partner Ekaterina Dzehalevich from Belarus, she reached the quarterfinals where they were beaten by the pair composed of Nuria Llagostera Vives and Arantxa Parra Santonja.

== Personal life ==
Her older brother is professional ice hockey player Maxim Afinogenov. She is married to professional ice hockey player Max Pacioretty since 2011. They have four sons and one daughter together.

In 2017, Afinogenova co-founded The Latte Co., a milk-substitute company specializing in plant-based powder formulas for babies older than 12 months and children younger than 8 years.

== ITF Circuit finals ==
$25,000 tournaments
$10,000 tournaments

=== Singles (0–4) ===
Result	Date	Tier	Tournament	Surface	Opponent	Score
Loss	28 May 2002	10,000	Louisville, United States	Hard	(Canada) Mélanie Marois	6–1, 3–6, 3–6
Loss	30 May 2005	10,000	Hilton Head, United States	Hard	(United States) Ansley Cargill	6–4, 3–6, 6–7^{(8)}
Loss	25 October 2006	25,000	Augusta, United States	Hard	(Romania) Edina Gallovits-Hall	0–6, 2–6
Loss	20 March 2007	25,000	Redding, United States	Hard	(Chinese Taipei) Hsieh Su-wei	3–6, 7–6^{(4)}, 6–7^{(5)}

=== Doubles (1–3) ===
Result	Date	Tier	Tournament	Surface	Partner	Opponents	Score
Loss	1 October 2001	10,000	Aventura, United States	Clay	(Haiti) Neyssa Etienne	(United States) Milangela Morales (United States) Shenay Perry	w/o
Win	26 June 2006	10,000	Kharkiv, Ukraine	Clay	(Russia) Vasilisa Davydova	(Ukraine) Galyna Kosyk (Russia) Anna Lapushchenkova	6–1, 7–5
Loss	29 May 2007	25,000	Moscow, Russia	Clay	(Ukraine) Oksana Uzhylovska	(Russia) Alisa Kleybanova (Russia) Ekaterina Makarova	3–6, 7–6^{(4)}, 3–6
Loss	14 April 2008	25,000	Palm Beach Gardens, United States	Clay	(United States) Lauren Albanese	(Czech Republic) Michaela Paštiková (Brazil) Maria Fernanda Alves	6–3, 3–6, [5–10]
