= Olga Panova =

Russian tennis player

Olga Panova Ольга Панова
- Full name: Olga Alexandrovna Panova
- Country (sports): Russia
- Born: 7 January 1987 (age 39) Krasnodar, Soviet Union
- Prize money: $47,075

Singles
- Career record: 121–108
- Career titles: 0
- Highest ranking: No. 274 (17 July 2006)

Doubles
- Career record: 112–81
- Career titles: 9 ITF
- Highest ranking: No. 192 (21 August 2006)

Olga Alexandrovna Panova (Russian: Ольга Александровна Панова; born 7 January 1987) is a Russian former tennis player. Her younger sister, Alexandra Panova, is still active as a tennis player.

In her career, Olga won nine doubles titles on the ITF Women's Circuit. On 17 July 2006, she reached her best singles ranking of world No. 274. On 21 August 2006, she peaked at No. 192 in the doubles rankings.

Partnering Ekaterina Makarova in 2005, Panova was runner-up at the $75k Al Habtoor Tennis Challenge in Dubai. She made her WTA Tour main-draw debut at the 2006 İstanbul Cup, partnered with Vasilisa Davydova, but they lost their first-round match against Yuliana Fedak and Eva Hrdinová.

== ITF Circuit finals ==
=== Singles (0–2) ===
Legend $25,000 tournaments $10,000 tournaments	Finals by surface Hard (0–1) Clay (0–1)

Result	No.	Date	Location	Surface	Opponent	Score
Loss	1.	4 July 2004	Krasnoarmeysk, Russia	Hard	(Russia) Ekaterina Bychkova	2–6, 3–6
Loss	2.	13 August 2005	Moscow, Russia	Clay	(Russia) Anastasia Pivovarova	6–7^{(1–7)}, 6–7^{(4–7)}

=== Doubles (9–11) ===
Legend $75,000 tournaments $25,000 tournaments $10,000 tournaments	Finals by surface Hard (2–6) Clay (6–5) Carpet (1–0)

Result	No.	Date	Location	Surface	Partner	Opponents	Score
Loss	1.	3 August 2003	Istanbul, Turkey	Hard	(Russia) Irina Kotkina	(Hungary) Julia Ács (Hungary) Zsuzsanna Fodor	7–6^{(7–5)}, 3–6, 4–6
Loss	2.	6 February 2005	Vale do Lobo, Portugal	Hard	(Ukraine) Irina Buryachok	(Romania) Mădălina Gojnea (Romania) Gabriela Niculescu	3–6, 4–6
Win	3.	20 February 2005	Portimão, Portugal	Hard	(Ukraine) Irina Buryachok	(France) Anaïs Laurendon (Slovakia) Linda Smoleňáková	6–4, 6–2
Win	4.	10 April 2005	Minsk, Belarus	Carpet (i)	(Russia) Alexandra Panova	(Belarus) Olga Govortsova (Ukraine) Kateryna Polunina	7–5, 6–3
Loss	5.	8 May 2005	Antalya, Turkey	Clay	(Ukraine) Irina Buryachok	(Romania) Gabriela Niculescu (Romania) Monica Niculescu	3–6, 4–6
Win	6.	29 May 2005	Kyiv, Ukraine	Clay	(Russia) Alexandra Panova	(Russia) Vasilisa Davydova (Russia) Kristina Movsesyan	6–2, 6–0
Loss	7.	3 July 2005	Galați, Romania	Clay	(Russia) Vasilisa Davydova	(Romania) Gabriela Niculescu (Romania) Corina-Claudia Corduneanu	4–6, 7–5, 1–6
Win	8.	12 August 2005	Moscow, Russia	Clay	(Russia) Ekaterina Lopes	(Russia) Anna Bastrikova (Russia) Vasilisa Davydova	7–5, 6–3
Loss	9.	4 September 2005	Balashikha, Russia	Clay	(Russia) Ekaterina Lopes	(Russia) Anna Bastrikova (Russia) Nina Bratchikova	2–6, 2–6
Win	10.	17 September 2005	Tbilisi, Georgia	Clay	(Russia) Irina Kotkina	(Russia) Vasilisa Davydova (Turkey) Pemra Özgen	6–2, 3–6, 6–4
Loss	11.	17 December 2005	Dubai, United Arab Emirates	Hard	(Russia) Ekaterina Makarova	(Czech Republic) Gabriela Chmelinová (Czech Republic) Hana Šromová	5–7, 4–6
Win	12.	26 March 2006	Amiens, France	Clay (i)	(Kazakhstan) Yaroslava Shvedova	(France) Julie Coin (France) Karla Mraz	6–4, 6–1
Win	13.	19 November 2006	Pune, India	Clay	(Romania) Ágnes Szatmári	(Italy) Nicole Clerico (Kyrgyzstan) Ksenia Palkina	6–2, 6–4
Win	14.	18 February 2007	Stockholm, Sweden	Hard (i)	(Montenegro) Danica Krstajić	(Romania) Sorana Cîrstea (United Kingdom) Melanie South	6–2, 0–6, 6–2
Loss	15.	23 March 2007	Mumbai, India	Hard	(Switzerland) Stefanie Vögele	(Uzbekistan) Akgul Amanmuradova (Russia) Nina Bratchikova	2–6, 3–6
Loss	16.	14 August 2010	Versmold, Germany	Clay	(Russia) Aminat Kushkhova	(Japan) Erika Sema (Czech Republic) Hana Birnerová	3–6, 3–6
Win	17.	29 August 2010	Braunschweig, Germany	Clay	(Russia) Aminat Kushkhova	(Germany) Jana Nabel (Germany) Antonia Lottner	6–3, 6–0
Loss	18.	5 September 2010	Mollerussa, Spain	Hard	(Russia) Aminat Kushkhova	(Ukraine) Yevgeniya Kryvoruchko (Morocco) Nadia Lalami	3–6, 7–5, [8–10]
Loss	19.	26 February 2011	Antalya, Turkey	Clay	(Russia) Marina Shamayko	(China) Tian Ran (China) Liang Chen	7–6^{(7–2)}, 5–7, [9–11]
Loss	20.	26 March 2011	Moscow, Russia	Hard (i)	(Russia) Alexandra Panova	(Ukraine) Lyudmyla Kichenok (Ukraine) Nadiia Kichenok	3–6, 3–6
