= 2006 İstanbul Cup =

- Date: 22–28 May
- Edition: 2nd
- Category: WTA Tier III
- Draw: 30S / 16D
- Prize money: $200,000
- Surface: Clay / outdoor
- Location: Istanbul, Turkey

Champions

Singles
- (Israel) Shahar Pe'er

Doubles
- (Ukraine) Alona Bondarenko / (Belarus) Anastasiya Yakimova
- İstanbul Cup

The 2006 İstanbul Cup was a women's tennis tournament played on outdoor clay courts. It was the second edition of the İstanbul Cup, and part of the WTA Tier III tournaments of the 2006 WTA Tour. It was held in Istanbul from 22 May through 28 May 2006. Fourth-seeded Shahar Pe'er won the singles title.

== Finals ==
=== Singles ===
(Israel) Shahar Pe'er defeated (Russia) Anastasia Myskina, 1–6, 6–3, 7–6^{(7–3)}

- It was Pe'er's 3rd and last singles title of the year and the 3rd of her career.

=== Doubles ===
(Ukraine) Alona Bondarenko / (Belarus) Anastasiya Yakimova defeated (India) Sania Mirza / (Australia) Alicia Molik, 6–2, 6–4

- It was the 1st doubles title for both Bondarenko and Yakimova in their respective careers.

== Points and prize money ==
=== Point distribution ===
Event	W	F	SF	QF	Round of 16	Round of 32	Q	Q3	Q2	Q1
Singles	120	85	55	30	16	1	7.25	3.75	2.25	1
Doubles	120	85	55	30	1	—N/a	7.5	—N/a	—N/a	—N/a

=== Prize money ===
Event	W	F	SF	QF	Round of 16	Round of 32	Q3	Q2	Q1
Singles	$30,500	$16,450	$8,840	$4,745	$2,250	$1,370	$735	$395	$215
Doubles *	$9,150	$4,900	$2,625	$1,410	$760	—N/a	—N/a	—N/a	—N/a

_{* per team}

== Singles main-draw entrants ==
=== Seeds ===
Country	Player	Rank^{1}	Seed
RUS	Anastasia Myskina	13	1
GER	Anna-Lena Grönefeld	14	2
RUS	Anna Chakvetadze	27	3
ISR	Shahar Pe'er	32	4
IND	Sania Mirza	35	5
COL	Catalina Castaño	37	6
ITA	Mara Santangelo	40	7
CRO	Jelena Kostanić	53	8

^{1} Rankings as of 15 May 2006

=== Other entrants ===
The following players received wildcards into the singles main draw:

- (Russia) Irina Kotkina
- (Australia) Alicia Molik
- (Turkey) İpek Şenoğlu

The following players received entry from the qualifying draw:

- (Austria) Tamira Paszek
- (Poland) Urszula Radwańska
- (Slovakia) Magdaléna Rybáriková
- (Indonesia) Angelique Widjaja

=== Retirements ===
- (Hungary) Melinda Czink (gastroenteritis)
- (Greece) Eleni Daniilidou (left abdominal strain)
- (Russia) Irina Kotkina (right elbow inflammation)

== Doubles main-draw entrants ==
=== Seeds ===
Country	Player	Country	Player	Rank^{1}	Seed
GER	Anna-Lena Grönefeld	USA	Meghann Shaughnessy	15	1
ITA	Maria Elena Camerin	SUI	Emmanuelle Gagliardi	98	2
GRE	Eleni Daniilidou	GER	Jasmin Wöhr	106	3
USA	Ashley Harkleroad	USA	Bethanie Mattek	150	4

^{1} Rankings as of 15 May 2006

=== Other entrants ===
The following pair received entry from the qualifying draw:

- (Poland) Agnieszka Radwańska / (Poland) Urszula Radwańska

The following pair received entry as lucky losers:

- (Russia) Vasilisa Davydova / (Russia) Olga Panova

=== Withdrawals ===
Before the tournament

- (Hungary) Melinda Czink (gastroenteritis) → replaced by Davydova/Panova

During the tournament

- (United States) Ashley Harkleroad (right shoulder inflammation)
- (United States) Meghann Shaughnessy (right ankle sprain)
