= 2006 İstanbul Cup – Singles =

Singles
- 2006 İstanbul Cup

Final
- Champion: (Israel) Shahar Pe'er
- Runner-up: (Russia) Anastasia Myskina
- Score: 1–6, 6–3, 7–6^{(7–3)}

Details
- Draw: 30
- Seeds: 8

Events
Singles	Doubles
- İstanbul Cup

Venus Williams was the defending champion, but did not compete this year.

Shahar Pe'er won the title by defeating Anastasia Myskina 1–6, 6–3, 7–6^{(7–3)} in the final.

== Seeds ==
The top two seeds received a bye into the second round.

1. (Russia) Anastasia Myskina (final)
2. (Germany) Anna-Lena Grönefeld (semifinals)
3. (Russia) Anna Chakvetadze (first round)
4. (Israel) Shahar Pe'er (champion)
5. (India) Sania Mirza (second round)
6. (Colombia) Catalina Castaño (quarterfinals)
7. (Italy) Mara Santangelo (quarterfinals)
8. (Croatia) Jelena Kostanić (first round)

== Draw ==
Key

- Q = Qualifier
- WC = Wild card
- LL = Lucky loser
- Alt = Alternate
- ITF = ITF entry
- PR = Protected ranking
- SR = Special ranking
- SE = Special exempt
- JE = Junior exempt
- JR = Junior Accelerator Programme entrant
- CO = College Accelerator Programme entrant
- NG = Next Gen Accelerator Program entrant
- w/o = Walkover
- r = Retired
- d = Defaulted

=== Finals ===
Semifinals
1	(Russia) Anastasia Myskina	6	7^{7}
(Netherlands) Michaëlla Krajicek	2	6^{5}
4	(Israel) Shahar Pe'er	6	6
2	(Germany) Anna-Lena Grönefeld	0	2

Final
1	(Russia) Anastasia Myskina	6	3	6^{3}
4	(Israel) Shahar Pe'er	1	6	7^{7}

=== Top half ===
First round
(Bulgaria) T Pironkova	7^{7}	3	6
(Argentina) M Díaz Oliva	6^{3}	6	3
Q	(Austria) T Paszek	5	6	6
WC	(Australia) A Molik	7	4	4
(Ukraine) A Bondarenko	3	3
6	(Colombia) C Castaño	6	6
3	(Russia) A Chakvetadze	6	4	0
(United States) M Shaughnessy	1	6	6
Q	(Indonesia) A Widjaja	2	1
(Belarus) A Yakimova	6	6
(Netherlands) M Krajicek	6	4
WC	(Russia) I Kotkina	0	0^{r}
WC	(Turkey) İ Şenoğlu	3	1
5	(India) S Mirza	6	6

Second round
1	(Russia) A Myskina	6	6
(Bulgaria) T Pironkova	4	2
Q	(Austria) T Paszek	6	3	4
6	(Colombia) C Castaño	3	6	6
(United States) M Shaughnessy	6	3	0
(Belarus) A Yakimova	2	6	6
(Netherlands) M Krajicek	4	6	6
5	(India) S Mirza	6	1	2

Quarterfinals
1	(Russia) A Myskina	6	7^{7}
6	(Colombia) C Castaño	4	6^{3}
(Belarus) A Yakimova	1	0
(Netherlands) M Krajicek	6	6

Semifinals
1	(Russia) A Myskina	6	7^{7}
(Netherlands) M Krajicek	2	6^{5}

=== Bottom half ===
First round
7	(Italy) M Santangelo	6
(Hungary) M Czink	1^{r}
(Slovakia) D Cibulková	6^{4}	6	6
(United States) A Harkleroad	7^{7}	3	0
Q	(Poland) U Radwańska	6	7
(Italy) ME Camerin	4	5
(United States) J Jackson	2	1
4	(Israel) S Pe'er	6	6
8	(Croatia) J Kostanić	2	6^{3}
(Croatia) K Šprem	6	7^{7}
Q	(Slovakia) M Rybáriková	6^{9}	7^{7}	3
(United States) M Washington	7^{11}	6^{5}	6
(Switzerland) E Gagliardi	6	2
(Greece) E Daniilidou	1	0^{r}

Second round
7	(Italy) M Santangelo	6	6
(Slovakia) D Cibulková	1	4
Q	(Poland) U Radwańska	3	0
4	(Israel) S Pe'er	6	6
(Croatia) K Šprem	6	6
(United States) M Washington	4	1
(Switzerland) E Gagliardi	6^{3}	2
2	(Germany) A-L Grönefeld	7^{7}	6

Quarterfinals
7	(Italy) M Santangelo	1	2
4	(Israel) S Pe'er	6	6
(Croatia) K Šprem	4	4
2	(Germany) A-L Grönefeld	6	6

Semifinals
4	(Israel) S Pe'er	6	6
2	(Germany) A-L Grönefeld	0	2
