= Vasilisa Davydova =

Russian tennis player

- Native name: Василиса Давыдова
- Country (sports): Russia
- Born: February 6, 1986 (age 40)
- Turned pro: 2002
- Retired: 2010
- Plays: Left (two-handed both sides)
- Prize money: $44,659

Singles
- Career record: 87–112
- Career titles: 0
- Highest ranking: No. 491 (10 July 2006)

Doubles
- Career record: 186–106
- Career titles: 16 ITF
- Highest ranking: No. 157 (25 August 2008)

Vasilisa Davydova (Russian: Василиса Давыдовой; born 6 February 1986) is a former professional Russian tennis player.

In her career, she won 16 doubles titles on the ITF Women's Circuit. On 10 July 2006, she reached her best singles ranking of world No. 491. On 25 August 2008, she peaked at No. 157 in the doubles rankings.

Davydova made her WTA Tour main-draw debut at the 2006 İstanbul Cup, in the doubles event partnering Olga Panova.

Partnering Maria Kondratieva, Davydova won her first k$50 tournament in July 2008 at the Dnipropetrovsk, defeating Lyudmyla Kichenok and Nadiia Kichenok in the final.

== ITF finals ==
=== Doubles: 33 (16–17) ===
Legend
$50,000 tournaments
$25,000 tournaments
$10,000 tournaments

Result	Date	Tier	Tournament	Surface	Partner	Opponent	Score
Win	25 August 2003	10,000	Timișoara, Romania	Clay	(Hungary) Julia Ács	(Romania) Gabriela Niculescu (Romania) Monica Niculescu	6–4, 6–3
Loss	20 January 2004	10,000	Hull, United Kingdom	Hard (i)	(Russia) Anna Bastrikova	(United Kingdom) Claire Curran (South Africa) Surina De Beer	0–6, 4–6
Win	4 July 2004	10,000	Krasnoarmeisk, Russia	Hard	(Russia) Ekaterina Bychkova	(Russia) Vasilisa Bardina (Russia) Julia Efremova	7–6^{(7–4)}, 6–0
Win	4 July 2004	10,000	Istanbul, Turkey	Hard	(Russia) Svetlana Mossiakova	(Ukraine) Valeria Bondarenko (Spain) Gabriela Velasco Andreu	6–3, 6–3
Win	25 January 2005	10,000	Hull, United Kingdom	Hard (i)	(Russia) Irina Bulykina	(United Kingdom) Katie O'Brien (United Kingdom) Melanie South	4–6, 6–3, 7–5
Loss	25 May 2005	10,000	Kyiv, Ukraine	Clay	(Russia) Kristina Movsesyan	(Russia) Alexandra Panova (Russia) Olga Panova	2–6, 0–6
Loss	3 July 2005	10,000	Galați, Romania	Clay	(Russia) Olga Panova	(Romania) Gabriela Niculescu (Romania) Corina Corduneanu	4–6, 7–5, 1–6
Loss	17 July 2005	10,000	Istanbul, Turkey	Hard	(Ukraine) Irina Buryachok	(Turkey) Pemra Özgen (Spain) Gabriela Velasco Andreu	2–6, 3–6
Loss	25 July 2005	10,000	Arad, Romania	Clay	(Russia) Anna Bastrikova	(Romania) Corina Corduneanu (Romania) Raluca Olaru	1–6, 4–6
Loss	8 August 2005	10,000	Moscow, Russia	Clay	(Russia) Anna Bastrikova	(Russia) Ekaterina Lopes (Russia) Olga Panova	5–7, 3–6
Loss	12 September 2005	10,000	Tbilisi, Georgia	Clay	(Turkey) Pemra Özgen	(Russia) Irina Kotkina (Russia) Olga Panova	2–6, 6–3, 4–6
Win	26 June 2006	10,000	Kharkiv, Ukraine	Clay	(Russia) Ekaterina Afinogenova	(Ukraine) Galyna Kosyk (Russia) Anna Lapushchenkova	6–1, 7–5
Win	3 July 2006	10,000	Zhukovsky, Russia	Clay	(Azerbaijan) Elina Gasanova	(Russia) Eugeniya Pashkova (Russia) Elizaveta Titova	6–3, 6–4
Loss	1 October 2006	25,000	Batumi Open, Georgia	Hard	(Russia) Marina Shamayko	(Czech Republic) Petra Cetkovská (Turkey) İpek Şenoğlu	4–6, 6–3, 4–6
Loss	24 October 2006	25,000	Podolsk, Russia	Hard (i)	(Belarus) Ekaterina Dzehalevich	(Russia) Anastasia Pavlyuchenkova (Russia) Evgeniya Rodina	1–6, 2–6
Loss	28 November 2006	10,000	Cairo, Egypt	Clay	(Belarus) Varvara Galanina	(France) Émilie Bacquet (Poland) Olga Brózda	1–6, 3–6
Win	24 June 2007	10,000	Sarajevo, Bosnia and Herzegovina	Clay	(Serbia) Karolina Jovanović	(Russia) Vitalia Diatchenko (Croatia) Tamara Stojković	1–6, 6–0, 6–0
Loss	5 August 2007	10,000	Moscow, Russia	Clay	(Russia) Anna Lapushchenkova	(Russia) Tatiana Kotelnikova (Russia) Maria Zharkova	4–6, 6–3, 3–6
Loss	1 September 2007	50,000	Moscow, Russia	Clay	(Russia) Maria Kondratieva	(Russia) Alisa Kleybanova (Russia) Anastasia Pivovarova	4–6, 6–3, 2–6
Win	3 September 2007	10,000	Baku, Azerbaijan	Clay	(Serbia) Avgusta Tsybysheva	(Ukraine) Lesia Tsurenko (Ukraine) Kateryna Yergina	7–5, 4–6, [10–7]
Loss	17 September 2007	25,000	Telavi Open, Georgia	Clay	(Russia) Marina Shamayko	(Germany) Ria Sabay (Kyrgyzstan) Ksenia Palkina	2–6, 2–6
Loss	30 September 2007	25,000	Batumi Open, Georgia	Hard	(Russia) Marina Shamayko	(Romania) Mihaela Buzărnescu (Serbia) Vojislava Lukić	2–6, 4–6
Win	28 October 2007	25,000	Podolsk, Russia	Hard (i)	(Australia) Arina Rodionova	(Russia) Nina Bratchikova (Russia) Anastasia Poltoratskaya	6–3, 6–0
Loss	12 November 2007	10,000	Batumi Open, Georgia	Hard	(Russia) Elizaveta Tochilovskaya	(Spain) Leticia Costas (Spain) Maite Gabarrús-Alonso	5–7, 2–6
Win	28 October 2007	10,000	Podolsk, Russia	Hard (i)	(Russia) Elizaveta Tochilovskaya	(Ukraine) Kateryna Herth (Russia) Nina Bratchikova	6–2, 7–5
Win	27 January 2008	10,000	Open de l'Isère, France	Hard (i)	(Latvia) Irina Kuzmina	(Czech Republic) Barbora Krtičková (Czech Republic) Lucie Šípková	6–0, 7–5
Loss	17 March 2008	25,000	St. Petersburg, Russia	Hard (i)	(Russia) Nina Bratchikova	(Czech Republic) Nikola Fraňková (Russia) Anastasia Pavlyuchenkova	2–6, 2–6
Win	21 April 2008	25,000	Namangan, Uzbekistan	Hard	(Russia) Maria Zharkova	(Netherlands) Chayenne Ewijk (Russia) Marina Melnikova	3–6, 7–5, [10–6]
Win	26 May 2008	25,000	Tolyatti, Russia	Clay	(Russia) Nina Bratchikova	(Czech Republic) Nikola Fraňková (Austria) Patricia Mayr-Achleitner	6–3, 5–7, [10–3]
Win	28 July 2008	50,000	Dnipropetrovsk, Ukraine	Clay	(Russia) Maria Kondratieva	(Ukraine) Lyudmyla Kichenok (Ukraine) Nadiia Kichenok	6–3, 6–1
Loss	6 July 2009	10,000	Brussels, Belgium	Clay	(Russia) Elina Gasanova	(Czech Republic) Simona Dobrá (Czech Republic) Kateřina Vaňková	3–6, 4–6
Win	17 August 2009	25,000	Westende, Belgium	Hard	(Georgia (country)) Margalita Chakhnashvili	(France) Émilie Bacquet (Germany) Jasmin Wöhr	6–2, 7–5
Win	5 July 2009	10,000	Brussels, Belgium	Clay	(Russia) Elina Gasanova	(Netherlands) Marcella Koek (Netherlands) Josanne van Bennekom	7–5, 6–2
