= Irina Kotkina =

Russian tennis player

- Country (sports): Russia
- Born: 19 September 1986 (age 38); Moscow, Russia
- Plays: Right-handed
- Prize money: $28,714

Singles
- Career record: 83–73
- Career titles: 0
- Highest ranking: No. 400 (20 February 2006)

Doubles
- Career record: 49–50
- Career titles: 4 ITF
- Highest ranking: No. 319 (14 November 2005)

Irina Kotkina (born 19 September 1986) is a Russian former professional tennis player.

== Biography ==
A right-handed player from Moscow, Kotkina was a top 10 ranked junior. At the 2004 French Open, she and Yaroslava Shvedova were runners-up in the girls' doubles, to Kateřina Böhmová and Michaëlla Krajicek.

On the professional circuit she reached a best singles ranking of 400 in the world. She featured in one WTA Tour main draw, as a wildcard at the 2006 İstanbul Cup, where she retired hurt while trailing Michaëlla Krajicek in the first round, due to an elbow injury.

In her career, Kotkina won four ITF titles, all in doubles.

== ITF finals ==
=== Singles (0–4) ===
$50,000 tournaments
$10,000 tournaments

Outcome	No.	Date	Tournament	Surface	Opponent	Score
Runner-up	1.	17 February 2002	ITF Kaunas, Lithuania	Hard (i)	(Latvia) Katrina Banderę	6–2, 5–7, 4–6
Runner-up	2.	15 February 2004	ITF Albufeira, Portugal	Hard	(Romania) Monica Niculescu	1–6, 6–3, 0–6
Runner-up	3.	15 August 2004	ITF Albufeira, Portugal	Hard	(Portugal) Ana Catarina Nogueira	5–7, 0–6
Runner-up	4.	22 August 2004	ITF Coimbra, Portugal	Hard	(Uzbekistan) Akgul Amanmuradova	2–6, 3–6

=== Doubles (4–5) ===
Outcome	No.	Date	Tournament	Surface	Partner	Opponents	Score
Winner	1.	17 February 2002	ITF Kaunas, Lithuania	Hard (i)	(Russia) Daria Chemarda	(Estonia) Margit Rüütel (Estonia) Ilona Poljakova	6–0, 6–3
Winner	2.	8 July 2002	ITF İstanbul, Turkey	Clay	(Russia) Anna Chakvetadze	(Serbia and Montenegro) Daniela Berček (Serbia and Montenegro) Ana Četnik	7–5, 6–4
Runner-up	1.	23 June 2003	ITF Elektrostal, Russia	Hard	(Russia) Daria Chemarda	(France) Iryna Brémond (Ukraine) Olga Savchuk	3–6, 6–1, 3–6
Runner-up	2.	5 July 2003	ITF Balashikha, Russia	Clay	(France) Iryna Brémond	(Russia) Daria Chemarda (Russia) Elena Vesnina	5–7, 4–6
Runner-up	3.	3 August 2003	ITF İstanbul, Turkey	Hard	(Russia) Olga Panova	(Hungary) Julia Ács (Hungary) Zsuzsanna Fodor	7–6^{(5)}, 3–6, 4–6
Winner	3.	22 August 2004	ITF Coimbra, Portugal	Hard	(Uzbekistan) Akgul Amanmuradova	(Germany) Sarah Raab (Slovenia) Sandra Volk	2–6, 6–1, 6–1
Runner-up	4.	21 September 2004	ITF Batumi, Georgia	Hard	(Russia) Anna Bastrikova	(Ukraine) Alona Bondarenko (Russia) Galina Fokina	2–6, 2–6
Runner-up	5.	7 March 2005	ITF Las Palmas, Spain	Clay	(France) Charlène Vanneste	(Switzerland) Romina Oprandi (Switzerland) Vanessa Wellauer	5–7, 2–6
Winner	4.	17 September 2005	ITF Tbilisi, Georgia	Clay	(Russia) Olga Panova	(Russia) Vasilisa Davydova (Turkey) Pemra Özgen	6–2, 3–6, 6–4
