= Pemra Özgen =

Turkish tennis player (born 1986)

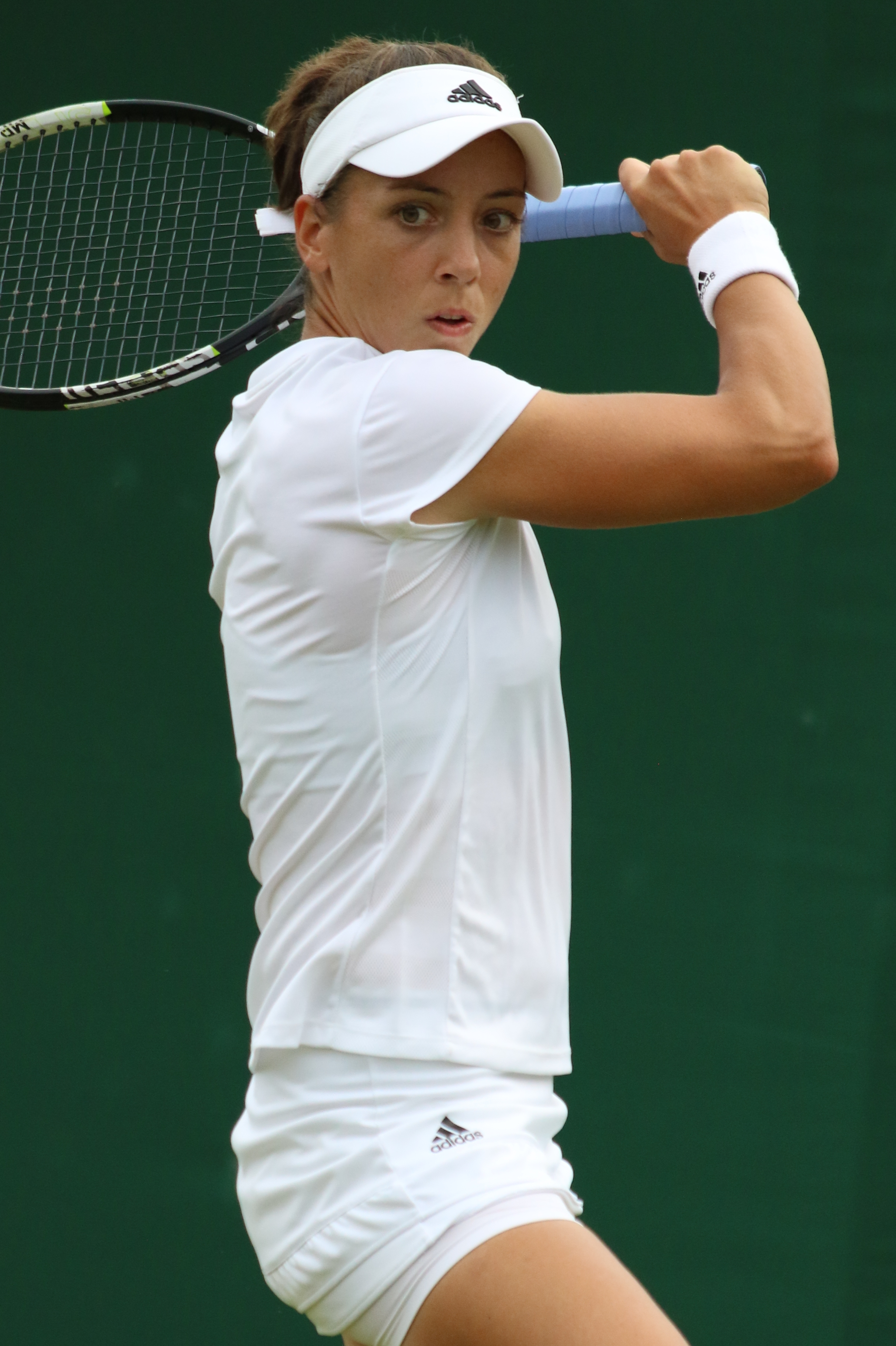
- Özgen at the 2019 Wimbledon qualifying
- Country (sports): Turkey
- Born: 8 May 1986 (age 40) Istanbul, Turkey
- Height: 1.70 m (5 ft 7 in)
- Retired: Nov 2024 (last match played)
- Prize money: $472,137

Singles
- Career record: 587–496
- Career titles: 18 ITF
- Highest ranking: No. 182 (26 August 2019)

Grand Slam singles results
- Australian Open: Q1 (2019, 2020, 2021)
- French Open: Q1 (2020, 2021)
- Wimbledon: Q2 (2019)
- US Open: Q2 (2013)

Doubles
- Career record: 305–257
- Career titles: 23 ITF
- Highest ranking: No. 179 (14 October 2013)

Team competitions
- Fed Cup: 41–44
Medal record
Representing Turkey
Mediterranean Games
Gold medal – first place	2013 Mersin	Women's doubles
Silver medal – second place	2009 Pescara	Women's doubles
- Last updated on: 15 May 2026.

Pemra Özgen (born 8 May 1986) is a Turkish former professional tennis player. She reached her best singles ranking of world No. 182 on 26 August 2019. On 14 October 2013, she peaked at No. 179 in the WTA doubles rankings. Özgen has won 18 singles and 23 doubles titles on the ITF Circuit.

Playing for Turkey Fed Cup team, Özgen has a win–loss record of 41–44 as of June 2024.

Özgen is an alumna of Istanbul Bilgi University.

== Career ==
Özgen, born in Istanbul, began playing tennis at the age of eight, and later trained at local clubs Taçspor Kulübü and Dağcılık Tenis Spor Kulübü.

Özgen made her WTA Tour debut at the 2007 Istanbul Cup, partnering Çağla Büyükakçay in doubles. The Turkish pair lost their first round match against Mervana Jugić-Salkić and Romina Oprandi. Along with Büyükakçay, she has won eight ITF doubles titles.

== Grand Slam singles performance timelines ==
Key
W	F	SF	QF	#R	RR	Q#	DNQ	A	NH

(W) winner; (F) finalist; (SF) semifinalist; (QF) quarterfinalist; (#R) rounds 4, 3, 2, 1; (RR) round-robin stage; (Q#) qualification round; (DNQ) did not qualify; (A) absent; (NH) not held; (SR) strike rate (events won / competed); (W–L) win–loss record.
To avoid confusion and double counting, these charts are updated at the conclusion of a tournament or when the player's participation has ended.

Tournament	2013	2014	2015	2016	2017	2018	2019	2020	2021	W–L
Australian Open	A	A	A	A	A	A	Q1	Q1	Q1	0–0
French Open	A	A	A	A	A	A	A	Q1	Q1	0–0
Wimbledon	A	A	A	A	A	A	Q2	NH	Q1	0–0
US Open	Q2	A	A	A	A	A	Q1	A	A	0–0
Win–loss	0–0	0–0	0–0	0–0	0–0	0–0	0–0	0–0	0–0	0–0
Year-end ranking	215	262	308	412	393	240	205	212	326	

== ITF Circuit finals ==
=== Singles: 29 (18 titles, 11 runner–ups) ===
Legend $25,000 tournaments (6–5) $15,000 tournaments (2–1) $10,000 tournaments (10–5)	Finals by surface Hard (15–10) Clay (1–0) Carpet (2–1)

Result	W–L	Date	Tournament	Tier	Surface	Opponent	Score
Win	1–0	Jul 2005	ITF Istanbul, Turkey	10,000	Hard	(Czech Republic) Radana Holušová	6–4, 6–3
Loss	1–1	Nov 2005	ITF Ashkelon, Israel	10,000	Hard	(Canada) Sharon Fichman	1–6, 1–6
Loss	1–2	May 2008	ITF Gaziantep, Turkey	10,000	Hard	(Turkey) Çağla Büyükakçay	5–7, 4–6
Win	2–2	Jun 2008	ITF Izmir, Turkey	10,000	Hard	(Brazil) Vivian Segnini	6–2, 7–6^{(5)}
Win	3–2	Jun 2008	ITF Istanbul, Turkey	10,000	Hard	(Georgia (country)) Ekaterine Gorgodze	6–4, 7–6^{(1)}
Win	4–2	Jul 2009	ITF Izmir, Turkey	10,000	Hard	(Poland) Sandra Zaniewska	6–0, 6–4
Win	5–2	Aug 2010	ITF Gaziantep, Turkey	10,000	Hard	(Australia) Jade Hopper	6–4, 6–4
Win	6–2	Aug 2010	ITF Istanbul, Turkey	10,000	Hard	(Portugal) Magali de Lattre	6–2, 5–0 ret.
Loss	6–3	Feb 2013	ITF Leimen, Germany	10,000	Hard (i)	(Germany) Julia Kimmelmann	4–6, 3–6
Win	7–3	Jul 2013	ITF Woking, United Kingdom	25,000	Hard	(United Kingdom) Tara Moore	3–6, 7–5, 7–6^{(10)}
Win	8–3	Aug 2014	Neva Cup St. Petersburg, Russia	25,000	Clay	(Croatia) Ema Mikulčić	6–1, 7–5
Loss	8–4	Jan 2015	ITF Stuttgart, Germany	10,000	Hard (i)	(Germany) Antonia Lottner	6–3, 3–6, 2–6
Win	9–4	Mar 2015	ITF Oslo, Norway	10,000	Hard (i)	(Poland) Justyna Jegiołka	2–6, 6–3, 7–6^{(5)}
Win	10–4	Oct 2015	ITF Heraklion, Greece	10,000	Hard	(Sweden) Fanny Östlund	6–0, 6–1
Loss	10–5	Oct 2015	ITF Heraklion, Greece	10,000	Hard	(Greece) Valentini Grammatikopoulou	6–3, 3–6, 3–6
Win	11–5	Jun 2016	ITF Antalya, Turkey	10,000	Hard	(France) Lou Brouleau	7–5, 6–2
Win	12–5	Oct 2016	ITF Sharm El Sheikh, Egypt	10,000	Hard	(Russia) Anastasia Pribylova	6–4, 7–5
Loss	12–6	Mar 2017	ITF Sharm El Sheikh, Egypt	15,000	Hard	(United Kingdom) Katie Swan	3–6, 1–6
Win	13–6	Nov 2017	ITF Sharm El Sheikh, Egypt	15,000	Hard	(Belarus) Shalimar Talbi	6–4, 6–2
Win	14–6	Nov 2017	ITF Sharm El Sheikh, Egypt	15,000	Hard	(Serbia) Barbara Bonic	6–2, 6–2
Loss	14–7	Apr 2018	ITF Óbidos, Portugal	25,000	Carpet	(Australia) Arina Rodionova	3–6, 2–6
Loss	14–8	Sep 2018	ITF Lisbon, Portugal	25,000	Hard	(Netherlands) Lesley Kerkhove	2–6, 6–7^{(3)}
Win	15–8	Oct 2018	ITF Óbidos, Portugal	25,000	Carpet	(Italy) Gaia Sanesi	5–7, 6–4, 6–2
Win	16–8	May 2019	ITF Óbidos, Portugal	25,000	Carpet	(Poland) Urszula Radwańska	7–5, 3–0 ret.
Win	17–8	Jul 2019	ITF Corroios, Portugal	25,000	Hard	(France) Océane Dodin	3–6, 6–4, 6–3
Loss	17–9	Aug 2019	GB Pro-Series Foxhills, UK	25,000	Hard	(Netherlands) Lesley Kerkhove	6–7^{(6)}, 2–6
Loss	17–10	Oct 2019	ITF Istanbul, Turkey	25,000	Hard (i)	(Russia) Kamilla Rakhimova	3–6, 7–5, 3–6
Loss	17–11	May 2022	ITF Montemor-o-Novo, Portugal	25,000	Hard	(France) Alice Robbe	1–6, 2–6
Win	18–11	Jul 2022	ITF Porto, Portugal	25,000	Hard	(Spain) Eva Guerrero Álvarez	6–3, 2–6, 6–2

=== Doubles: 51 (23 titles, 28 runner–ups) ===
Legend $60,000 tournaments (1–0) $25,000 tournaments (9–14) $10/15,000 tournaments (13–14)	Finals by surface Hard (13–18) Clay (10–9) Carpet (0–1)

Result	W–L	Date	Tournament	Tier	Surface	Partner	Opponents	Score
Loss	0–1	Aug 2003	ITF Wrexham, UK	10,000	Hard	(Turkey) İpek Şenoğlu	(Republic of Ireland) Yvonne Doyle (Republic of Ireland) Karen Nugent	3–6, 3–6
Win	1–1	May 2004	ITF Antalya, Turkey	10,000	Clay	(Spain) Gabriela Velasco Andreu	(Ukraine) Kateryna Avdiyenko (Ukraine) Oxana Lyubtsova	6–0, 6–2
Win	2–1	May 2004	ITF Antalya, Turkey	10,000	Clay	(Spain) Gabriela Velasco Andreu	(Ukraine) Kateryna Avdiyenko (Ukraine) Oxana Lyubtsova	6–1, 6–4
Loss	2–2	Nov 2004	ITF Ramat HaSharon, Israel	10,000	Hard	(Spain) Gabriela Velasco Andreu	(Israel) Tzipora Obziler (Israel) Danielle Steinberg	5–7, 3–6
Loss	2–3	Apr 2005	ITF Ramat HaSharon, Israel	10,000	Hard	(Belgium) Jessie de Vries	(Ukraine) Irina Buryachok (France) Charlène Vanneste	1–6, 2–6
Loss	2–4	Jun 2005	ITF Nazaré, Portugal	10,000	Hard	(Georgia (country)) Nana Urotadze	(Brazil) Joana Cortez (Italy) Silvia Disderi	7–6^{(3)}, 1–6, 4–6
Win	3–4	Jul 2005	ITF Istanbul, Turkey	10,000	Hard	(Spain) Gabriela Velasco Andreu	(Ukraine) Irina Buryachok (Russia) Vasilisa Davydova	6–2, 6–3
Loss	3–5	Sep 2005	ITF Tbilisi, Georgia	10,000	Clay	(Russia) Vasilisa Davydova	(Russia) Irina Kotkina (Russia) Olga Panova	2–6, 6–3, 4–6
Loss	3–6	Dec 2005	ITF Ramat HaSharon, Israel	10,000	Hard	(Spain) Gabriela Velasco Andreu	(Netherlands) Marrit Boonstra (Netherlands) Nicole Thyssen	2–6, 3–6
Win	4–6	Jan 2006	ITF Grenoble, France	10,000	Hard (i)	(Romania) Simona Matei	(France) Florence Haring (France) Virginie Pichet	6–3, 7–5
Win	5–6	Jun 2006	ITF Montemor-o-Novo, Portugal	10,000	Hard	(Greece) Anna Koumantou	(Portugal) Neuza Silva (Norway) Karoline Steiro	w/o
Loss	5–7	Mar 2007	ITF Athens, Greece	10,000	Hard	(Greece) Anna Koumantou	(Portugal) Neuza Silva (Netherlands) Nicole Thyssen	2–6, 4–6
Loss	5–8	Apr 2007	ITF Dubai, UAE	10,000	Hard	(Germany) Ria Dörnemann	(Ukraine) Kateryna Avdiyenko (Russia) Kristina Grigorian	2–6, 1–6
Loss	5–9	May 2008	ITF Antalya, Turkey	25,000	Clay	(Georgia (country)) Oksana Kalashnikova	(Austria) Melanie Klaffner (Belarus) Ksenia Milevskaya	2–6, 5–7
Win	6–9	May 2008	ITF Gaziantep, Turkey	10,000	Hard	(Turkey) Çağla Büyükakçay	(Belarus) Volha Duko (Georgia (country)) Ana Jikia	2–0 ret.
Win	7–9	Jun 2008	ITF Izmir, Turkey	10,000	Hard	(Turkey) Çağla Büyükakçay	(North Macedonia) Emilia Arnaudovska (Ukraine) Yuliana Umanets	6–2, 6–0
Loss	7–10	Jun 2008	ITF Istanbul, Turkey	10,000	Hard	(Bulgaria) Dessislava Mladenova	(Israel) Chen Astrogo (Belarus) Volha Duko	5–7, 6–1, [5–10]
Win	8–10	Aug 2008	ITF Trecastagni, Italy	10,000	Hard	(Australia) Emily Hewson	(Italy) Valeria Casillo (Italy) Lilly Raffa	w/o
Loss	8–11	Oct 2008	ITF Istanbul Turkey	25,000	Hard (i)	(Turkey) Çağla Büyükakçay	(Austria) Melanie Klaffner (Bosnia and Herzegovina) Sandra Martinović	4–6, 7–6^{(5)}, [6–10]
Loss	8–12	Mar 2009	ITF Lyon, France	10,000	Hard (i)	(China) Zhang Shuai	(China) Lu Jingjing (China) Sun Shengnan	4–6, 5–7
Win	9–12	Apr 2009	ITF Antalya, Turkey	10,000	Hard	(Turkey) Çağla Büyükakçay	(Ukraine) Tetyana Arefyeva (Ukraine) Anastasiya Lytovchenko	6–4, 6–2
Loss	9–13	May 2009	ITF Namangan, Uzbekistan	25,000	Hard	(Turkey) Çağla Büyükakçay	(Uzbekistan) Albina Khabibulina (Kyrgyzstan) Ksenia Palkina	4–6, 7–6^{(6)}, [5–10]
Loss	9–14	Jun 2009	ITF Qarshi, Uzbekistan	25,000	Hard	(Turkey) Çağla Büyükakçay	(Ukraine) Kristina Antoniychuk (Georgia (country)) Oksana Kalashnikova	7–5, 0–6, [6–10]
Loss	9–15	Jun 2009	ITF Istanbul, Turkey	10,000	Hard	(Turkey) Çağla Büyükakçay	(Russia) Galina Fokina (Russia) Anna Morgina	4–6, 6–4, [8–10]
Win	10–15	Jul 2009	ITF Istanbul, Turkey	10,000	Hard	(Georgia (country)) Manana Shapakidze	(Georgia (country)) Sofia Kvatsabaia (Russia) Avgusta Tsybysheva	6–2, 6–2
Win	11–15	May 2010	ITF Antalya, Turkey	10,000	Clay	(Poland) Sandra Zaniewska	(Croatia) Indire Akiki (Czech Republic) Martina Kubičíková	6–1, 6–2
Loss	11–16	May 2010	ITF Izmir, Turkey	25,000	Hard	(Turkey) Çağla Büyükakçay	(Brazil) Maria Fernanda Alves (Austria) Tamira Paszek	1–6, 2–6
Win	12–16	Jun 2010	ITF Cologne, Germany	10,000	Clay	(Ukraine) Kateryna Avdiyenko	(Germany) Sarah Urbanek (Germany) Alina Wessel	6–0, 6–2
Loss	12–17	Jun 2010	ITF Kristinehamn, Sweden	25,000	Clay	(Israel) Julia Glushko	(Bosnia and Herzegovina) Mervana Jugić-Salkić (Finland) Emma Laine	2–6, 3–6
Win	13–17	Mar 2011	ITF Antalya, Turkey	10,000	Clay	(Poland) Sandra Zaniewska	(Hungary) Réka Luca Jani (Czech Republic) Martina Kubičíková	2–6, 7–5, [10–7]
Win	14–17	Jul 2011	ITF Aschaffenburg, Germany	25,000	Clay	(Japan) Yurika Sema	(Czech Republic) Hana Birnerová (Liechtenstein) Stephanie Vogt	6–4, 7–6^{(5)}
Loss	14–18	Jul 2011	ITF Samsun, Turkey	25,000	Hard	(Turkey) Çağla Büyükakçay	(Romania) Mihaela Buzărnescu (Slovenia) Tadeja Majerič	1–6, 4–6
Win	15–18	Oct 2011	ITF Netanya, Israel	25,000	Hard	(Turkey) Çağla Büyükakçay	(Italy) Nicole Clerico (Israel) Julia Glushko	7–5, 6–3
Win	16–18	Sep 2012	Open de Saint-Malo, France	25,000	Clay	(Ukraine) Alyona Sotnikova	(Bulgaria) Aleksandrina Naydenova (Brazil) Teliana Pereira	6–4, 7–6^{(6)}
Win	17–18	Nov 2012	ITF Istanbul, Turkey	25,000	Hard (i)	(Turkey) Çağla Büyükakçay	(Uzbekistan) Nigina Abduraimova (Kyrgyzstan) Ksenia Palkina	6–2, 6–1
Loss	17–19	Jan 2013	ITF Eilat, Israel	10,000	Hard	(Belarus) Ilona Kremen	(Russia) Alla Kudryavtseva (Romania) Raluca Olaru	3–6, 3–6
Loss	17–20	Jun 2013	ITF Ağrı, Turkey	25,000	Carpet	(Turkey) Çağla Büyükakçay	(Turkey) Melis Sezer (Bosnia and Herzegovina) Jasmina Tinjić	4–6, 6–3, [8–10]
Loss	17–21	Jun 2013	ITF Ystad, Sweden	25,000	Clay	(Australia) Monique Adamczak	(Germany) Kristina Barrois (Lithuania) Lina Stančiūtė	4–6, 5–7
Win	18–21	Sep 2013	GB Pro-Series Shrewsbury, UK	25,000	Hard (i)	(Turkey) Çağla Büyükakçay	(United Kingdom) Samantha Murray (United Kingdom) Jade Windley	4–6, 6–4, [10–8]
Win	19–21	Sep 2013	GB Pro-Series Loughborough, UK	25,000	Hard (i)	(Turkey) Çağla Büyükakçay	(Poland) Magda Linette (Czech Republic) Tereza Smitková	6–2, 5–7, [10–6]
Win	20–21	Nov 2013	ITF Istanbul, Turkey	25,000	Hard (i)	(Turkey) Çağla Büyükakçay	(Georgia (country)) Sofia Shapatava (Ukraine) Anastasiya Vasylyeva	6–3, 6–2
Loss	20–22	Jun 2014	ITF La Marsa, Tunisia	25,000	Clay	(Switzerland) Xenia Knoll	(Venezuela) Andrea Gámiz (Russia) Valeria Savinykh	6–1, 6–7^{(6)}, [9–11]
Loss	20–23	Nov 2014	GB Pro-Series Bath, UK	25,000	Hard (i)	(Serbia) Barbara Bonić	(Netherlands) Lesley Kerkhove (Switzerland) Xenia Knoll	3–6, 1–6
Win	21–23	May 2015	ITF La Marsa, Tunisia	25,000	Clay	(Turkey) İpek Soylu	(Georgia (country)) Sofia Shapatava (Ukraine) Anastasiya Vasylyeva	3–6, 6–3, [10–4]
Loss	21–24	Jun 2015	ITF Minsk, Belarus	25,000	Clay	(Ukraine) Anastasiya Vasylyeva	(Russia) Valentyna Ivakhnenko (Russia) Irina Khromacheva	3–6, 0–6
Win	22–24	Jun 2015	ITF Helsingborg, Sweden	25,000	Clay	(United States) Bernarda Pera	(Georgia (country)) Ekaterine Gorgodze (Sweden) Cornelia Lister	6–2, 6–0
Loss	22–25	Jul 2015	ITF Darmstadt, Germany	25,000	Clay	(Germany) Anne Schäfer	(Russia) Irina Khromacheva (Belarus) Lidziya Marozava	4–6, 4–6
Loss	22–26	Feb 2017	ITF Sharm El Sheikh, Egypt	15,000	Clay	(Croatia) Ana Vrljić	(Ukraine) Veronika Kapshay (Bulgaria) Julia Terziyska	3–6, 6–2, [7–10]
Loss	22–27	Mar 2017	ITF Sharm El Sheikh, Egypt	15,000	Clay	(Croatia) Ana Vrljić	(Ukraine) Veronika Kapshay (Germany) Julia Wachaczyk	4–6, 6–2, [5–10]
Win	23–27	Jul 2018	Reinert Open, Germany	60,000	Clay	(Greece) Despina Papamichail	(Serbia) Nina Stojanović (Serbia) Olga Danilović	1–6, 6–2, [10–4]
Loss	23–28	Jan 2020	Canberra International, Australia (Note: Tournament was held in Bendigo instead of Canberra.)	25,000	Hard	(Hungary) Anna Bondar	(Australia) Alison Bai (Australia) Jaimee Fourlis	7–5, 4–6, [8–10]
