= Gabriela Velasco Andreu =

Spanish tennis player (born 1985)

- Country (sports): Spain
- Born: 1 April 1985 (age 41)
- Turned pro: 1999
- Retired: 2007
- Plays: Right-handed (two handed backhand)
- Prize money: $42,704

Singles
- Career record: 109–121
- Career titles: 0
- Highest ranking: No. 369 (20 June 2005)

Doubles
- Career record: 130–86
- Career titles: 12 ITF
- Highest ranking: No. 229 (17 July 2006)

Gabriela Velasco Andreu (born 1 April 1985) is a Spanish former professional tennis player.

Velasco Andreu won 12 doubles titles on the ITF Women's Circuit in her career. On 20 June 2005, she reached her best singles ranking of world No. 369. On 17 July 2006, she peaked at No. 229 in the doubles rankings.

Velasco Andreu made her WTA Tour debut at the 2003 Copa Colsanitas. She retired from professional tennis in 2007.

== ITF finals ==
=== Singles (0–4) ===
Legend $25,000 tournaments $10,000 tournaments	Finals by surface Hard (0–1) Clay (0–3)

Result	No.	Date	Tournament	Surface	Opponent	Score
Loss	1.	1 December 2003	Cairo, Egypt	Clay	(Switzerland) Gaëlle Widmer	4–6, 6–4, 2–6
Loss	2.	8 December 2003	Cairo, Egypt	Clay	(Russia) Ekaterina Bychkova	1–6, 4–6
Loss	3.	22 March 2004	Cairo, Egypt	Clay	(Czech Republic) Hana Šromová	3–6, 1–6
Loss	4.	26 July 2004	Istanbul, Turkey	Hard	(France) Aurélie Védy	0–6, 6–7^{(5–7)}

=== Doubles (12–17) ===
Legend $25,000 tournaments $10,000 tournaments	Finals by surface Hard (7–10) Clay (5–7)

Result	No.	Date	Tournament	Surface	Partner	Opponents	Score
Loss	1.	12 May 2002	Tortosa, Spain	Clay	(Spain) Adriana González Peñas	(Spain) Marta Fraga (Spain) María José Sánchez Alayeto	5–7, 1–6
Loss	2.	8 June 2003	Ankara, Turkey	Clay	(Russia) Julia Efremova	(Ukraine) Olga Lazarchuk (Russia) Svetlana Mossiakova	4–6, 1–6
Loss	3.	16 June 2003	Montemor-o-Novo, Portugal	Hard	(Hungary) Zsuzsanna Babos	(New Zealand) Eden Marama (New Zealand) Paula Marama	7–6^{(5)}, 3–6, 0–6
Win	1.	13 July 2003	Getxo, Spain	Clay	(Spain) Sabina Mediano-Alvarez	(Spain) Marta Fraga (Spain) Adriana González Peñas	w/o
Loss	4.	14 July 2003	Monteroni d'Arbia, Italy	Clay	(Israel) Danielle Steinberg	(Czech Republic) Iveta Gerlová (Slovakia) Zuzana Zemenová	6–7^{(4)}, 4–6
Win	2.	3 August 2003	Pontevedra, Spain	Hard	(Portugal) Neuza Silva	(Ukraine) Veronika Litvinskaya (Russia) Elena Poliakova	6–0, 6–1
Win	3.	13 October 2003	Santo Domingo, Dominican Republic	Hard	(Spain) Julia Gandia	(Argentina) Soledad Esperón (Argentina) Flavia Mignola	6–3, 4–6, 7–5
Loss	5.	1 December 2003	Cairo, Egypt	Clay	(Spain) Julia Gandia	(Russia) Raissa Gourevitch (Russia) Ekaterina Kozhokina	6–2, 3–6, 1–6
Loss	6.	14 March 2004	Tel Aviv, Israel	Hard	(Spain) Julia Gandia	(Czech Republic) Iveta Gerlová (Portugal) Frederica Piedade	2–6, 6–4, 2–6
Win	4.	10 May 2004	Antalya, Turkey	Clay	(Turkey) Pemra Özgen	(Ukraine) Kateryna Hert (Ukraine) Oxana Lyubtsova	6–0, 6–2
Win	5.	17 May 2004	Antalya, Turkey	Clay	(Turkey) Pemra Özgen	(Ukraine) Kateryna Hert (Ukraine) Oxana Lyubtsova	6–1, 6–4
Loss	7.	24 May 2004	Istanbul, Turkey	Hard	(Czech Republic) Hana Šromová	(France) Iryna Brémond (Ukraine) Yevgenia Savranska	3–6, 4–6
Loss	8.	1 August 2004	Istanbul, Turkey	Hard	(Ukraine) Valeria Bondarenko	(Russia) Vasilisa Davydova (Russia) Svetlana Mossiakova	3–6, 3–6
Win	6.	10 August 2004	Coimbra, Portugal	Hard	(Argentina) Natalia Garbellotto	(Italy) Alice Balducci (Slovenia) Maša Zec Peškirič	6–4, 6–1
Loss	9.	8 November 2004	Ramat HaSharon, Israel	Hard	(Turkey) Pemra Özgen	(Israel) Tzipora Obziler (Israel) Danielle Steinberg	5–7, 3–6
Loss	10.	26 April 2005	Torrent, Spain	Clay	(Spain) Núria Roig	(Italy) Sara Errani (Spain) Paula García	7–6^{(5)}, 4–6, 2–6
Loss	11.	9 May 2005	Monzón, Spain	Hard	(Czech Republic) Petra Cetkovská	(Ukraine) Olena Antypina (South Africa) Surina De Beer	5–7, 5–7
Win	7.	11 July 2005	Istanbul, Turkey	Hard	(Turkey) Pemra Özgen	(Ukraine) Irina Buryachok (Russia) Vasilisa Davydova	6–2, 6–3
Loss	12.	19 July 2005	Zwevegem, Belgium	Clay	(Czech Republic) Petra Cetkovská	(Belgium) Leslie Butkiewicz (Belgium) Caroline Maes	3–6, 2–6
Loss	13.	23 August 2005	Amarante, Portugal	Hard	(Argentina) Flavia Mignola	(Brazil) Joana Cortez (Portugal) Neuza Silva	2–6, 3–6
Win	8.	10 October 2005	Lagos, Nigeria	Hard	(South Africa) Surina De Beer	(Switzerland) Lisa Sabino (Slovenia) Maša Zec Peškirič	6–4, 6–2
Loss	14.	28 November 2005	Ramat HaSharon, Israel	Hard	(Turkey) Pemra Özgen	(Netherlands) Marrit Boonstra (Netherlands) Nicole Thyssen	2–6, 3–6
Win	9.	20 February 2006	Ramat HaSharon, Israel	Hard	(Russia) Aleksandra Kulikova	(France) Iryna Brémond (Ukraine) Yana Levchenko	7–5, 7–6^{(3)}
Loss	15.	5 March 2006	Raanana, Israel	Hard	(Turkey) İpek Şenoğlu	(Czech Republic) Iveta Gerlová (Czech Republic) Veronika Raimrová	2–6, 6–2, 3–6
Win	10.	12 March 2006	Haifa, Israel	Hard	(Turkey) İpek Şenoğlu	(France) Iryna Brémond (Ukraine) Yana Levchenko	6–0, 6–0
Win	11.	1 May 2006	Torrent, Spain	Clay	(Russia) Ekaterina Makarova	(Spain) Sílvia Soler Espinosa (Spain) Carla Suárez Navarro	6–4, 6–2
Loss	16.	25 July 2006	A Coruña, Spain	Hard	(Spain) Astrid Waernes	(Spain) Melissa Cabrera-Handt (Spain) Carolina Gago Fuentes	4–6, 0–6
Loss	17.	9 October 2006	Benicarló, Spain	Clay	(Ukraine) Veronika Kapshay	(Spain) Nuria Sánchez García (Italy) Verdiana Verardi	4–6, 3–6
Win	12.	30 April 2007	Vic, Spain	Clay	(Spain) Francisca Sintès Martín	(Spain) Melissa Cabrera-Handt (Spain) Carolina Gago Fuentes	6–3, 4–6, 6–1
