= Paula Marama =

New Zealand tennis player

- Country (sports): New Zealand
- Born: 13 February 1984 (age 42) Wellington, New Zealand
- Turned pro: 1998
- Retired: 2006
- Plays: Right (two-handed backhand)
- Prize money: $13,321

Singles
- Career record: 38–35
- Career titles: 1 ITF
- Highest ranking: No. 443 (27 September 2004)

Doubles
- Career record: 54-18
- Career titles: 10 ITF

Paula Marama (born 13 February 1984) is a retired New Zealand female tennis player.

In her career, she won one singles title and ten doubles titles on the ITF Circuit. On 27 September 2004, she reached her highest singles ranking of world No. 443. On 26 April 2004, she peaked at No. 289 in the doubles rankings.

Playing for New Zealand in the Fed Cup, Marama has a win–loss record of 5–3.

== ITF Circuit finals ==
Legend
$50,000 tournaments
$25,000 tournaments
$10,000 tournaments

=== Singles (1–0) ===
Result	No.	Date	Tournament	Surface	Opponent	Score
Win	1.	15 March 2004	Yarrawonga, Australia	Grass	(China) Yuan Meng	w/o

=== Doubles (10–2) ===
Result	No.	Date	Tournament	Surface	Partner	Opponents	Score
Win	1.	16 June 2003	Montemor-o-Novo, Portugal	Hard	(New Zealand) Eden Marama	(Hungary) Zsuzsanna Babos (Spain) Gabriela Velasco Andreu	6–7^{(5–7)}, 6–3, 6–0
Win	2.	27 July 2003	Dublin, Ireland	Carpet	(New Zealand) Eden Marama	(Republic of Ireland) Yvonne Doyle (Republic of Ireland) Karen Nugent	6–4, 7–5
Win	3.	24 August 2003	Coimbra, Portugal	Hard	(Israel) Danielle Steinberg	(United Kingdom) Hannah Collin (Portugal) Neuza Silva	6–4, 7–6^{(7–3)}
Win	4.	22 September 2003	Volos, Greece	Grass	(New Zealand) Eden Marama	(Romania) Laura-Ramona Husaru (Ukraine) Viktoria Lytovchenko	6–2, 6–4
Win	5.	5 October 2003	Vertou, France	Hard (i)	(New Zealand) Eden Marama	(France) Iryna Brémond (Ukraine) Yevgenia Savranska	6–4, 6–2
Loss	1.	8 December 2003	Cairo, Egypt	Clay	(New Zealand) Eden Marama	(Russia) Ekaterina Bychkova (Russia) Raissa Gourevitch	0–6, 6–7^{(2–7)}
Win	6.	15 December 2003	Cairo, Egypt	Clay	(New Zealand) Eden Marama	(Russia) Raissa Gourevitch (Russia) Ekaterina Kozhokina	6–3, 6–0
Win	7.	1 March 2004	Warrnambool, Australia	Grass	(New Zealand) Eden Marama	(Australia) Casey Dellacqua (Australia) Jaslyn Hewitt	6–3, 4–6, 6–2
Win	8.	9 March 2004	Benalla, Australia	Grass	(New Zealand) Eden Marama	(Australia) Lauren Breadmore (United States) Kaysie Smashey	7–5, 6–1
Win	9.	8 August 2004	Wrexham, Wales	Hard	(New Zealand) Eden Marama	(India) Rushmi Chakravarthi (India) Sania Mirza	7–6^{(7–4)}, 7–5
Loss	2.	3 August 2005	Wrexham, Wales	Hard	(India) Rushmi Chakravarthi	(United Kingdom) Rebecca Llewellyn (United Kingdom) Anna Smith	3–6, 5–7
Win	10.	12 February 2006	Wellington, New Zealand	Hard	(New Zealand) Kairangi Vano	(New Zealand) Leanne Baker (New Zealand) Ellen Barry	6–3, 6–1
