= Valeria Bondarenko =

Ukrainian tennis player (born 1982)

- Native name: Валерія Бондаренко
- Country (sports): Ukraine
- Residence: Kharkov, Ukraine
- Born: 20 June 1982 (age 43); Kryvyi Rih, Soviet Union
- Turned pro: 1997
- Retired: 2008
- Plays: Right-handed
- Prize money: $33,028

Singles
- Career record: 38–89
- Career titles: 0
- Highest ranking: No. 636 (30 September 2002)

Doubles
- Career record: 127–109
- Career titles: 8 ITF
- Highest ranking: No. 189 (16 August 2004)

Valeria Volodymyrivna Bondarenko (Ukrainian: Валерія Володимирівна Бондаренко; born 20 June 1982) is a Ukrainian former tennis player, the older sister of tennis players Alona and Kateryna Bondarenko.

In her career, she won eight doubles titles on the ITF Circuit. Her career-high singles ranking is world No. 636, reached in 2002. Her best doubles ranking of 189, she achieved on 16 August 2004.

Bondarenko retired from professional tennis in 2008.

== ITF Circuit finals ==
=== Doubles: 21 (8–13) ===
$100,000 tournaments
$75,000 tournaments
$50,000 tournaments
$25,000 tournaments
$10,000 tournaments

Outcome	No.	Date	Tournament	Surface	Partner	Opponents	Score
Runner-up	1.	25 April 1999	ITF Hvar, Croatia	Clay	(Ukraine) Alona Bondarenko	(New Zealand) Shelley Stephens (New Zealand) Rewa Hudson	2–6, 6–4, 3–6
Runner-up	2.	6 June 1999	ITF Kędzierzyn-Koźle, Poland	Clay	(Ukraine) Alona Bondarenko	(Poland) Katarzyna Teodorowicz-Lisowska (Poland) Anna Bieleń-Żarska	7–5, 4–6, 1–6
Winner	1.	18 June 2000	ITF Kędzierzyn-Koźle	Clay	(Ukraine) Alona Bondarenko	(Ukraine) Elena Kovalchuk (Ukraine) Olga Lazarchuk	6–4, 6–2
Winner	2.	2 July 2000	ITF Istanbul, Turkey	Hard	(Russia) Goulnara Fattakhetdinova	(Russia) Irina Kornienko (Belarus) Elena Yaryshka	6–2, 4–6, 6–3
Runner-up	3.	27 May 2001	ITF Olecko, Poland	Clay	(Ukraine) Kateryna Bondarenko	(Slovakia) Martina Babáková (Czech Republic) Lenka Snajdrová	2–6, 2–6
Runner-up	4.	12 August 2001	ITF Kędzierzyn-Koźle	Clay	(Ukraine) Alona Bondarenko	(Czech Republic) Petra Raclavská (Czech Republic) Blanka Kumbárová	1–6, 2–6
Winner	3.	16 June 2002	ITF Kędzierzyn-Koźle	Clay	(Ukraine) Mariya Koryttseva	(Czech Republic) Lenka Tvarošková (Slovakia) Martina Babáková	6–3, 6–0
Winner	4.	18 August 2002	ITF Koksijde, Belgium	Clay	(Lithuania) Edita Liachovičiūtė	(Czech Republic) Zuzana Černá (Czech Republic) Vladimíra Uhlířová	6–4, 6–2
Runner-up	5.	18 August 2002	ITF Westende, Belgium	Clay	(Lithuania) Edita Liachovičiūtė	(Belgium) Leslie Butkiewicz (Australia) Nicole Kriz	1–6, 6–7^{(4)}
Winner	5.	20 October 2002	Open de Touraine, France	Hard (i)	(Ukraine) Alona Bondarenko	(Germany) Jasmin Wöhr (Czech Republic) Michaela Paštiková	7–6^{(4)}, 4–6, 6–3
Winner	6.	1 June 2003	ITF Warsaw, Poland	Clay	(Ukraine) Alona Bondarenko	(France) Iryna Brémond (Ukraine) Olga Lazarchuk	6–3, 6–4
Winner	7.	1 September 2003	ITF Zhukovskiy, Russia	Clay	(Ukraine) Alona Bondarenko	(Russia) Goulnara Fattakhetdinova (Russia) Maria Kondratieva	6–7^{(6)}, 6–4, 6–3
Runner-up	6.	18 April 2004	Open de Biarritz, France	Clay	(Ukraine) Alona Bondarenko	(Ukraine) Mariya Koryttseva (Ukraine) Elena Tatarkova	5–7, 0–6
Runner-up	7.	3 May 2004	ITF Warsaw, Poland	Clay	(Ukraine) Natalia Bogdanova	(Poland) Monika Schneider (Poland) Olga Brózda	6–2, 4–6, 2–6
Runner-up	8.	23 May 2004	ITF Gdynia, Poland	Clay	(Ukraine) Natalia Bogdanova	(Germany) Stefanie Weis (Sweden) Maria Wolfbrandt	6–3, 3–6, 5–7
Winner	8.	12 July 2004	ITF Lviv, Ukraine	Clay	(Ukraine) Veronika Kapshay	(Ukraine) Anna Sydorska (Ukraine) Oksana Uzhylovska	6–3, 4–6, 7–6^{(2)}
Runner-up	9.	1 August 2004	ITF Istanbul, Turkey	Hard	(Spain) Gabriela Velasco Andreu	(Russia) Vasilisa Davydova (Russia) Svetlana Mossiakova	3–6, 3–6
Runner-up	10.	8 August 2004	ITF Gdynia, Poland	Clay	(Ukraine) Natalia Bogdanova	(Poland) Klaudia Jans-Ignacik (Poland) Alicja Rosolska	2–6, 4–6
Runner-up	11.	20 March 2005	ITF Cairo, Egypt	Clay	(Ukraine) Hanna Andreyeva	(Romania) Gabriela Niculescu (Romania) Monica Niculescu	2–6, 3–6
Runner-up	12.	22 May 2006	ITF Kyiv, Ukraine	Clay	(Ukraine) Oksana Uzhylovska	(Ukraine) Veronika Kapshay (Ukraine) Yana Levchenko	3–6, 5–7
Runner-up	13.	11 December 2006	Dubai Challenge, United Arab Emirates	Hard	(Ukraine) Kateryna Bondarenko	(Croatia) Jelena Kostanić Tošić (Bosnia and Herzegovina) Mervana Jugić-Salkić	3–6, 0–6
