= Veronika Kapshay =

Ukrainian tennis player

Veronika Kapshay Вероніка Капшай
- Country (sports): Ukraine
- Born: 2 December 1986 (age 39) Lviv, Soviet Union
- Height: 1.75 m (5 ft 9 in)
- Prize money: $188,873

Singles
- Career record: 333–281
- Career titles: 3 ITF
- Highest ranking: No. 227 (14 May 2012)

Doubles
- Career record: 336–239
- Career titles: 23 ITF
- Highest ranking: No. 114 (20 April 2009)

Veronika Kapshay (Ukrainian: Вероніка Капшай; born 2 December 1986) is a Ukrainian former tennis player.

Kapshay won three singles titles and 23 doubles titles on the ITF Circuit. On 14 May 2012, she reached her best singles ranking of world No. 227. On 20 April 2009, she peaked at No. 114 in the doubles rankings.

== ITF Circuit finals ==
=== Singles: 9 (3 titles, 6 runner-ups) ===
| Legend $100,000 tournaments $75,000 tournaments $50,000 tournaments $25,000 tournaments $10,000 tournaments | Finals by surface Hard (0–1) Clay (3–3) Grass (0–1) Carpet (0–1) |

| Result | No. | Date | Tournament | Surface | Opponent | Score |
|---|---|---|---|---|---|---|
| Win | 1. | 28 May 2006 | ITF Kyiv, Ukraine | Clay | (Russia) Vesna Manasieva | 6–2, 0–6, 7–5 |
| Loss | 1. | 11 June 2006 | ITF Warsaw, Poland | Clay | (Ukraine) Galyna Kosyk | 2–6, 7–6^{(0)}, 3–6 |
| Win | 2. | 2 July 2006 | ITF Kharkiv, Ukraine | Clay | (Russia) Anna Lapushchenkova | 4–6, 6–2, 6–1 |
| Loss | 2. | 15 October 2006 | ITF Benicarló, Spain | Carpet | (Italy) Verdiana Verardi | 4–6, 4–6 |
| Win | 3. | 27 May 2007 | ITF Cherkasy, Ukraine | Clay | (Ukraine) Kateryna Avdiyenko | 7–5, 6–1 |
| Loss | 3. | 16 May 2011 | ITF Moscow, Russia | Clay | (Kazakhstan) Yulia Putintseva | 2–6, 1–6 |
| Loss | 4. | 18 February 2013 | ITF Muzaffarnagar, India | Grass | (Austria) Melanie Klaffner | 2–6, 0–6 |
| Loss | 5. | 31 May 2014 | ITF Bukhara, Uzbekistan | Hard | (Uzbekistan) Akgul Amanmuradova | 3–6, 5–7 |
| Loss | 6. | 1 October 2016 | ITF Chișinău, Moldova | Clay | (Romania) Ilona Georgiana Ghioroaie | 4–6, 2–6 |

=== Doubles: 51 (23 titles, 28 runner-ups) ===
| Legend $100,000 tournaments $75,000 tournaments $50,000 tournaments $25,000 tournaments $15,000 tournaments $10,000 tournaments | Finals by surface Hard (12–12) Clay (10–14) Grass (0–1) Carpet (1–1) |

| Result | No. | Date | Tournament | Surface | Partner | Opponents | Score |
|---|---|---|---|---|---|---|---|
| Loss | 1. | 27 October 2003 | ITF Istanbul, Turkey | Hard (i) | (Austria) Susanne Aigner | (Russia) Daria Chemarda (Russia) Svetlana Mossiakova | w/o |
| Loss | 2. | 24 November 2003 | ITF Haifa, Israel | Hard | (Hungary) Barbara Pócza | (Ukraine) Olena Antypina (Russia) Nina Bratchikova | 5–7, 4–6 |
| Win | 1. | 17 July 2004 | ITF Lviv, Ukraine | Clay | (Ukraine) Valeria Bondarenko | (Ukraine) Anna Sydorska (Ukraine) Oksana Uzhylovska | 6–3, 4–6, 7–6^{(2)} |
| Loss | 3. | 11 June 2005 | ITF Warsaw, Poland | Clay | (Russia) Elena Chalova | (Poland) Olga Brózda (Poland) Natalia Kołat | 1–6, 4–6 |
| Win | 2. | 27 May 2006 | ITF Kyiv, Ukraine | Clay | (Ukraine) Yana Levchenko | (Ukraine) Valeria Bondarenko (Ukraine) Oksana Uzhylovska | 6–3, 7–5 |
| Win | 3. | 16 September 2006 | ITF Gliwice, Poland | Clay | (Russia) Arina Rodionova | (Germany) Carmen Klaschka (Germany) Justine Ozga | 6–4, 7–5 |
| Loss | 4. | 14 October 2006 | ITF Benicarló, Spain | Clay | (Spain) Gabriela Velasco Andreu | (Spain) Nuria Sánchez García (Italy) Verdiana Verardi | 4–6, 3–6 |
| Win | 4. | 20 April 2007 | ITF Bari, Italy | Clay | (Ukraine) Mariya Koryttseva | (Australia) Sophie Ferguson (Slovakia) Katarína Kachlíková | 7–5, 6–2 |
| Loss | 5. | 19 August 2007 | ITF Penza, Russia | Clay | (Romania) Mihaela Buzărnescu | (France) Sophie Lefèvre (Romania) Ágnes Szatmári | 1–6, 2–6 |
| Win | 5. | 25 November 2007 | ITF Opole, Poland | Carpet (i) | (Poland) Olga Brózda | (Czech Republic) Lucie Kriegsmannová (Czech Republic) Darina Šeděnková | 7–5, 6–3 |
| Win | 6. | 10 May 2008 | ITF Jounieh, Lebanon | Clay | (Russia) Nina Bratchikova | (Slovakia) Kristína Kučová (Switzerland) Stefanie Vögele | 7–5, 3–6, [10–6] |
| Loss | 6. | 8 August 2008 | ITF Moscow, Russia | Clay | (Latvia) Irina Kuzmina | (Russia) Vitalia Diatchenko (Russia) Maria Kondratieva | 0–6, 4–6 |
| Loss | 7. | 7 August 2009 | ITF Moscow | Clay | (Austria) Melanie Klaffner | (Russia) Ekaterina Ivanova (Russia) Arina Rodionova | 2–6, 2–6 |
| Win | 7. | 3 October 2009 | ITF Tbilisi, Georgia | Clay | (Hungary) Réka Luca Jani | (Georgia (country)) Tatia Mikadze (Georgia (country)) Manana Shapakidze | 7–5, 0–6, [10–8] |
| Loss | 8. | 16 October 2009 | ITF Kharkiv, Ukraine | Carpet (i) | (Latvia) Irina Kuzmina | (Ukraine) Lyudmyla Kichenok (Ukraine) Nadiia Kichenok | 6–2, 2–6, [3–10] |
| Loss | 9. | 11 June 2010 | ITF Szczecin, Poland | Clay | (Germany) Justine Ozga | (Czech Republic) Petra Cetkovská (Czech Republic) Eva Hrdinová | 6–7^{(5)}, 3–6 |
| Win | 8. | 24 September 2010 | ITF Telavi, Georgia | Hard | (Romania) Ágnes Szatmári | (Georgia (country)) Oksana Kalashnikova (Austria) Melanie Klaffner | 6–1, 2–6, [10–8] |
| Loss | 10. | 24 March 2011 | ITF Kunming, China | Hard | (Ukraine) Irina Buryachok | (Japan) Shuko Aoyama (Japan) Rika Fujiwara | 3–6, 2–6 |
| Loss | 11. | 21 May 2011 | ITF Moscow, Russia | Clay | (Poland) Justyna Jegiołka | (Russia) Nadejda Guskova (Russia) Valeria Solovyeva | 3–6, 6–7^{(2)} |
| Win | 9. | 17 June 2011 | ITF Astana, Kazakhstan | Hard | (Russia) Ekaterina Yashina | (Serbia) Tamara Čurović (Uzbekistan) Sabina Sharipova | 2–6, 6–3, [15–13] |
| Loss | 12. | 10 September 2011 | ITF Saransk, Russia | Clay | (Czech Republic) Eva Hrdinová | (Romania) Mihaela Buzărnescu (Serbia) Teodora Mirčić | 3–6, 1–6 |
| Loss | 13. | 8 June 2012 | ITF Qarshi, Uzbekistan | Clay | (Serbia) Teodora Mirčić | (Ukraine) Valentyna Ivakhnenko (Ukraine) Kateryna Kozlova | 5–7, 3–6 |
| Loss | 14. | 20 July 2012 | ITF Astana | Hard | (Russia) Ekaterina Yashina | (Thailand) Luksika Kumkhum (Thailand) Varatchaya Wongteanchai | 2–6, 4–6 |
| Win | 10. | 20 September 2012 | ITF Yoshkar-Ola, Russia | Hard (i) | (Russia) Margarita Gasparyan | (Ukraine) Irina Buryachok (Russia) Valeria Solovyeva | 6–4, 2–6, [11–9] |
| Loss | 15. | 22 February 2013 | ITF Muzaffarnagar, India | Grass | (Poland) Justyna Jegiołka | (Thailand) Nicha Lertpitaksinchai (Thailand) Peangtarn Plipuech | 6–3, 4–6, [8–10] |
| Loss | 16. | 7 June 2013 | ITF Qarshi, Uzbekistan | Hard | (Serbia) Teodora Mirčić | (Russia) Margarita Gasparyan (Belarus) Polina Pekhova | 2–6, 1–6 |
| Loss | 17. | 14 June 2013 | ITF Bukhara, Uzbekistan | Hard | (Russia) Angelina Gabueva | (Japan) Eri Hozumi (Japan) Makoto Ninomiya | 6–3, 5–7, [8–10] |
| Win | 11. | 6 July 2013 | ITF Middelburg, Netherlands | Clay | (Kyrgyzstan) Ksenia Palkina | (Oman) Fatma Al-Nabhani (Belarus) Sviatlana Pirazhenka | 6–3, 6–3 |
| Loss | 18. | 30 August 2013 | ITF Kazan, Russia | Hard | (Turkey) Başak Eraydın | (Ukraine) Valentyna Ivakhnenko (Ukraine) Kateryna Kozlova | 4–6, 1–6 |
| Loss | 19. | 28 September 2013 | ITF Fergana, Uzbekistan | Hard | (Slovakia) Michaela Hončová | (Ukraine) Lyudmyla Kichenok (Belarus) Polina Pekhova | 4–6, 2–6 |
| Loss | 20. | 4 October 2013 | ITF Budapest, Hungary | Clay | (Hungary) Réka Luca Jani | (Switzerland) Timea Bacsinszky (Switzerland) Xenia Knoll | 6–7^{(3)}, 2–6 |
| Win | 12. | 25 January 2014 | ITF Sharm El Sheikh, Egypt | Hard | (Ukraine) Valentyna Ivakhnenko | (Turkey) Melis Sezer (Turkey) İpek Soylu | 3–6, 6–4, [10–5] |
| Win | 13. | 1 February 2014 | ITF Sharm El Sheikh | Hard | (Ukraine) Valentyna Ivakhnenko | (Russia) Polina Leykina (Greece) Despina Papamichail | 7–6^{(5)}, 6–2 |
| Loss | 21. | 28 February 2014 | ITF Astana, Kazakhstan | Hard (i) | (Kazakhstan) Kamila Kerimbayeva | (Uzbekistan) Albina Khabibulina (Kyrgyzstan) Ksenia Palkina | 4–6, 5–7 |
| Win | 14. | 30 May 2014 | ITF Bukhara, Uzbekistan | Hard | (Uzbekistan) Sabina Sharipova | (Uzbekistan) Nigina Abduraimova (Uzbekistan) Akgul Amanmuradova | 6–4, 6–4 |
| Win | 15. | 24 October 2014 | ITF Perth, Australia | Hard | (France) Alizé Lim | (Australia) Jessica Moore (Australia) Abbie Myers | 6–2, 2–6, [10–7] |
| Loss | 22. | 7 February 2015 | ITF Sharm El Sheikh | Hard | (Austria) Melanie Klaffner | (Russia) Anna Morgina (Japan) Yuuki Tanaka | 6–4, 4–6, [6–10] |
| Loss | 23. | 2 May 2015 | ITF Wiesbaden, Germany | Clay | (Netherlands) Cindy Burger | (Germany) Carolin Daniels (Switzerland) Viktorija Golubic | 4–6, 6–4, [6–10] |
| Win | 16. | 25 October 2015 | ITF Heraklion, Greece | Hard | (Germany) Julia Wachaczyk | (France) Estelle Cascino (Spain) María Martínez Martínez | 6–2, 6–4 |
| Win | 17. | 11 December 2015 | ITF Indore, India | Hard | (Ukraine) Anastasiya Vasylyeva | (India) Dhruthi Tatachar Venugopal (India) Karman Kaur Thandi | 6–1, 6–3 |
| Loss | 24. | 27 February 2016 | ITF Sharm El Sheikh | Hard | (Sweden) Jacqueline Cabaj Awad | (Romania) Elena-Teodora Cadar (Romania) Oana Georgeta Simion | 3–6, 2–6 |
| Loss | 25. | 19 March 2016 | ITF Sharm El Sheikh | Hard | (Switzerland) Karin Kennel | (Russia) Anastasiya Komardina (Russia) Yana Sizikova | 6–3, 3–6, [6–10] |
| Win | 18. | 26 March 2016 | ITF Sharm El Sheikh | Hard | (Ukraine) Anastasiya Shoshyna | (Switzerland) Karin Kennel (Greece) Despina Papamichail | 6–1, 6–2 |
| Win | 19. | 19 August 2016 | ITF Kharkiv | Clay | (Ukraine) Anastasiya Shoshyna | (Belarus) Ilona Kremen (Ukraine) Ganna Poznikhirenko | 4–6, 6–4, [11–9] |
| Loss | 26. | 9 September 2016 | ITF Bucha, Ukraine | Clay | (Ukraine) Anastasiya Shoshyna | (Belarus) Ilona Kremen (Ukraine) Ganna Poznikhirenko | 3–6, 2–6 |
| Loss | 27. | 30 September 2016 | ITF Chișinău, Moldova | Clay | (Ukraine) Angelina Shakhraychuk | (Ukraine) Maryna Kolb (Ukraine) Nadiya Kolb | 7–5, 5–7, [6–10] |
| Win | 20. | 7 October 2016 | ITF Chișinău | Clay | (Ukraine) Angelina Shakhraychuk | (France) Estelle Cascino (India) Kyra Shroff | 6–3, 3–6, [10–4] |
| Win | 21. | 25 February 2017 | ITF Sharm El Sheikh | Hard | (Bulgaria) Julia Terziyska | (Turkey) Pemra Özgen (Croatia) Ana Vrljić | 6–3, 2–6, [10–7] |
| Win | 22. | 4 March 2017 | ITF Sharm El Sheikh | Hard | (Germany) Julia Wachaczyk | (Turkey) Pemra Özgen (Croatia) Ana Vrljić | 6–4, 2–6, [10–5] |
| Loss | 28. | 21 April 2017 | ITF Shymkent, Kazakhstan | Clay | (Moldova) Alexandra Perper | (Belarus) Ilona Kremen (Russia) Yana Sizikova | 6–7^{(2)}, 1–6 |
| Win | 23. | 4 August 2017 | ITF Ivano-Frankivsk, Ukraine | Clay | (Ukraine) Maryna Chernyshova | (Romania) Elena-Teodora Cadar (Ukraine) Oleksandra Korashvili | 4–6, 6–2, [11–9] |
