= Iryna Brémond =

French tennis player

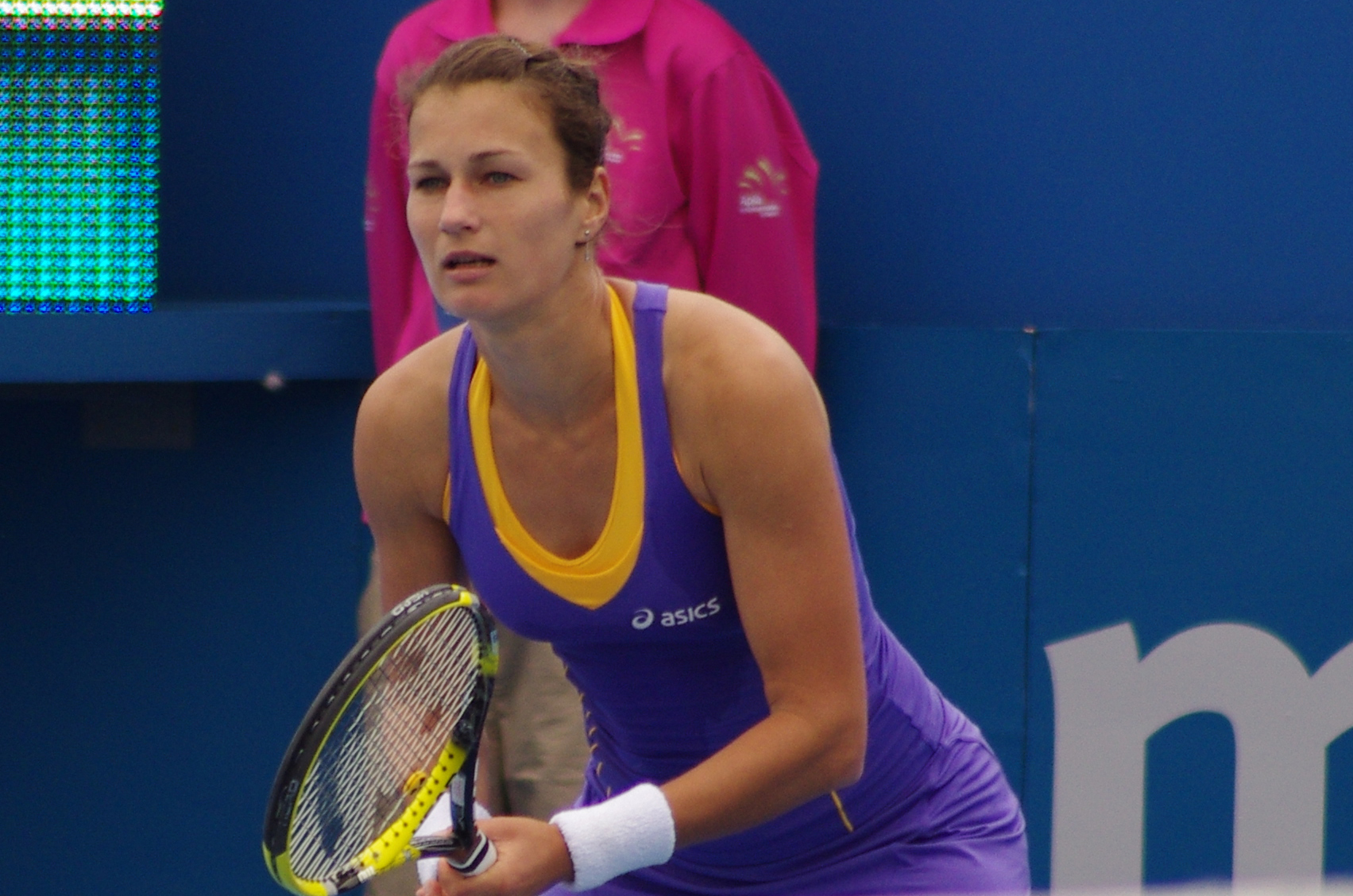
- Country (sports): France (Feb 2011–present); Belarus (1999 – Jan 2011)
- Residence: Paris, France
- Born: 5 October 1984 (age 41) Minsk, Belarus
- Height: 1.74 m (5 ft 9 in)
- Plays: Right-handed (two-handed backhand)
- Prize money: $277,228

Singles
- Career record: 312–197
- Career titles: 15 ITF
- Highest ranking: No. 93 (20 February 2012)

Grand Slam singles results
- Australian Open: 1R (2012)
- French Open: 2R (2011)
- Wimbledon: Q1 (2007,2010,2011,2012)
- US Open: Q1 (2007,2010,2011)

Doubles
- Career record: 161–130
- Career titles: 11 ITF
- Highest ranking: No. 162 (25 June 2007)

Iryna Brémond (née Kuryanovich) (Belarusian: Ірына Брэмон (Кур'яновіч); Russian: Ирина Бремон (Курьянович); born 5 October 1984) is a French former tennis player.

Her highest WTA ranking in singles is 93, which she reached on 20 February 2012. Her career-high in doubles is 162, achieved on 25 June 2007. Brémond won 15 singles titles and 11 doubles titles on the ITF Women's Circuit in her career.

In 2011, she married her coach, Gérald Brémond, consequently choosing to play for France instead of Belarus, her birth nation.

== ITF Circuit finals ==
$100,000 tournaments
$75,000 tournaments
$50,000 tournaments
$25,000 tournaments
$10,000 tournaments

=== Singles: 21 (15 titles, 6 runner-ups) ===
Result	No.	Date	Tournament	Surface	Opponent	Score
Loss	1.	30 May 2004	ITF İstanbul, Turkey	Hard	(Georgia (country)) Tinatin Kavlashvili	6–2, 1–6, 6–3
Loss	2.	10 July 2006	ITF Le Touquet, France	Clay	(France) Laura Thorpe	6–2, 3–6, 6–3
Win	1.	2 October 2006	ITF Nantes, France	Hard	(Belgium) Caroline Maes	1–6, 7–5, 6–1
Win	2.	12 November 2007	ITF Sunderland, UK	Hard (i)	(Australia) Christina Wheeler	6–1, 6–0
Win	3.	19 November 2007	ITF Ramat HaSharon, Israel	Hard	(Slovenia) Mika Urbančič	6–2, 6–0
Win	4.	22 June 2009	ITF Rotterdam, Netherlands	Hard	(Netherlands) Daniëlle Harmsen	6–4, 6–2
Win	5.	27 July 2009	ITF Rabat, Morocco	Clay	(Morocco) Nadia Lalami	4–6, 6–3, 6–1
Loss	3.	10 August 2009	ITF Koksijde, Belgium	Clay	(Ukraine) Julia Vakulenko	7–5, 6–1
Win	6.	7 September 2009	ITF Alphen a/d Rijn, Netherlands	Clay	(Sweden) Johanna Larsson	6–3, 6–3
Win	7.	22 March 2010	ITF Gonesse, France	Clay	(Italy) Giulia Gatto-Monticone	6–0, 6–3
Loss	4.	3 October 2010	ITF Clermont-Ferrand, France	Hard (i)	(Croatia) Ivana Lisjak	6–4, 6–1
Win	8.	25 October 2010	ITF İstanbul, Turkey	Hard	(Czech Republic) Andrea Hlaváčková	3–6, 6–1, 7–5
Win	9.	14 February 2011	ITF Mallorca, Spain	Clay	(Ukraine) Sofiya Kovalets	6–2, 6–3
Loss	5.	20 March 2011	ITF Sanya, China	Hard	(Hong Kong) Zhang Ling	3–6, 7–6^{(4)}, 6–2
Win	10.	27 March 2011	ITF Kunming, China	Clay	(Kazakhstan) Zarina Diyas	1–6, 6–2, 6–3
Win	11.	3 April 2011	ITF Wenshan, China	Hard (i)	(Croatia) Ani Mijačika	7–5, 3–6, 7–5
Win	12.	11 July 2011	Contrexéville Open, France	Clay	(France) Stéphanie Foretz	6–4, 6–7^{(1)}, 6–2
Win	13.	25 July 2011	ITF Vigo, Spain	Hard	(France) Julie Coin	7–6^{(7)}, 1–6, 7–6^{(7)}
Win	14.	9 October 2011	ITF Palembang, Indonesia	Hard	(Indonesia) Ayu Fani Damayanti	6–2, 6–3
Loss	6.	6 November 2011	Open Nantes Atlantique, France	Hard (i)	(United States) Alison Riske	6–1, 6–4
Win	15.	19 March 2012	ITF Gonesse, France	Clay	(France) Audrey Bergot	7–6^{(7)}, 6–3

=== Doubles: 30 (11 titles, 19 runner-ups) ===
Result	No.	Date	Tournament	Surface	Partner	Opponents	Score
Loss	1.	1 December 2002	ITF Mallorca, Spain	Clay	(Russia) Marianna Yuferova	(Spain) Rosa María Andrés Rodríguez (Serbia) Ana Timotić	4–6, 3–6
Loss	2.	19 May 2003	ITF Lviv, Ukraine	Clay	(Ukraine) Mariya Koryttseva	(Russia) Anna Bastrikova (Ukraine) Anna Zaporozhanova	4–6, 4–6
Loss	3.	1 June 2003	ITF Warsaw, Poland	Clay	(Ukraine) Olga Lazarchuk	(Ukraine) Alona Bondarenko (Ukraine) Valeria Bondarenko	3–6, 4–6
Win	1.	23 June 2003	ITF Elektrostal, Russia	Hard	(Ukraine) Olga Savchuk	(Russia) Daria Chemarda (Russia) Irina Kotkina	6–3, 1–6, 6–3
Loss	4.	5 July 2003	ITF Balashikha, Russia	Clay	(Russia) Irina Kotkina	(Russia) Daria Chemarda (Russia) Elena Vesnina	5–7, 4–6
Loss	5.	5 October 2003	ITF Vertou, France	Hard (i)	(Ukraine) Yevgenia Savranska	(New Zealand) Eden Marama (New Zealand) Paula Marama	4–6, 2–6
Loss	6.	9 November 2003	ITF Villenave-d'Ornon, France	Clay (i)	(Ukraine) Yevgenia Savranska	(Belgium) Caroline Maes (France) Aurélie Védy	3–6, 6–7^{(6)}
Win	2.	24 May 2004	ITF Istanbul, Turkey	Hard	(Ukraine) Yevgenia Savranska	(Czech Republic) Hana Šromová (Spain) Gabriela Velasco Andreu	6–3, 6–4
Win	3.	3 October 2004	Open Nantes Atlantique, France	Hard (i)	(Belarus) Tatsiana Uvarova	(Germany) Gréta Arn (Hungary) Rita Kuti-Kis	6–4, 4–6, 7–6^{(5)}
Loss	7.	14 February 2005	Midland Tennis Classic, United States	Hard	(Russia) Anna Bastrikova	(Ukraine) Yuliya Beygelzimer (United States) Kelly McCain	2–6, 4–6
Loss	8.	20 February 2006	ITF Ramat HaSharon, Israel	Hard	(Ukraine) Yana Levchenko	(Russia) Aleksandra Kulikova (Spain) Gabriela Velasco Andreu	5–7, 6–7^{(3)}
Loss	9.	12 March 2006	ITF Haifa, Israel	Hard	(Ukraine) Yana Levchenko	(Turkey) İpek Şenoğlu (Spain) Gabriela Velasco Andreu	0–6, 0–6
Loss	10.	19 March 2006	ITF Cairo, Egypt	Clay	(Ukraine) Kateryna Herth	(Poland) Olga Brózda (Italy) Silvia Disderi	3–6, 1–6
Win	4.	26 March 2006	ITF Mansoura, Egypt	Clay	(Ukraine) Kateryna Herth	(Romania) Laura Ioana Andrei (Serbia) Vojislava Lukić	6–2, 6–1
Win	5.	29 January 2007	ITF Belfort, France	Carpet (i)	(Israel) Yevgenia Savransky	(Czech Republic) Veronika Chvojková (Czech Republic) Eva Hrdinová	6–3, 7–5
Win	6.	10 March 2007	ITF Minsk, Belarus	Carpet (i)	(Belarus) Darya Kustova	(Russia) Ekaterina Makarova (Russia) Evgeniya Rodina	4–6, 6–4, 6–4
Loss	11.	10 April 2007	Open de Biarritz, France	Clay	(Russia) Ekaterina Lopes	(Russia) Evgeniya Rodina (Israel) Yevgenia Savransky	6–2, 1–6, 3–6
Loss	12.	11 May 2007	ITF Monzón, Spain	Hard	(Serbia) Vesna Dolonc	(Spain) Estrella Cabeza-Candela (Argentina) María Emilia Salerni	2–6, 1–6
Loss	13.	17 May 2007	Open Saint-Gaudens, France	Hard	(Uzbekistan) Akgul Amanmuradova	(Argentina) Jorgelina Cravero (Belarus) Darya Kustova	1–6, 3–6
Win	7.	19 November 2007	ITF Ramat HaSharon, Israel	Hard	(Slovenia) Mika Urbančič	(Israel) Julia Glushko (Israel) Keren Shlomo	6–4, 6–1
Loss	14.	15 December 2007	Lagos Open, Nigeria	Hard	(Romania) Ágnes Szatmári	(South Africa) Kelly Anderson (South Africa) Chanelle Scheepers	6–0, 3–6, [8–10]
Loss	15.	22 December 2007	Lagos Open, Nigeria	Hard	(Romania) Ágnes Szatmári	(South Africa) Kelly Anderson (South Africa) Chanelle Scheepers	6–1, 3–6, [6–10]
Win	8.	28 March 2010	ITF Gonesse, France	Clay (i)	(France) Audrey Bergot	(Brazil) Fernanda Faria (Brazil) Paula Cristina Gonçalves	6–3, 6–3
Loss	16.	2 May 2010	ITF Brescia, Italy	Clay	(Russia) Valeria Savinykh	(United Kingdom) Naomi Cavaday (Russia) Anastasia Pivovarova	3–6, 7–6^{(5)}, [8–10]
Loss	17.	31 May 2010	ITF Rome, Italy	Clay	(Netherlands) Arantxa Rus	(United States) Christina McHale (Australia) Olivia Rogowska	4–6, 1–6
Win	9.	27 September 2010	ITF Clermont-Ferrand, France	Hard (i)	(France) Youlia Fedossova	(France) Elixane Lechemia (France) Alizé Lim	7–6^{(7)}, 6–3
Loss	18.	25 October 2010	ITF İstanbul, Turkey	Hard	(Russia) Ekaterina Bychkova	(Georgia (country)) Oksana Kalashnikova (Russia) Marta Sirotkina	3–6, 1–6
Loss	19.	24 January 2011	Open de l'Isère, France	Hard (i)	(France) Aurélie Védy	(France) Stéphanie Cohen-Aloro (Tunisia) Selima Sfar	1–6, 3–6
Win	10.	14 February 2011	ITF Mallorca, Spain	Clay	(Ukraine) Irina Buryachok	(Czech Republic) Iveta Gerlová (Czech Republic) Lucie Kriegsmannová	7–5, 6–2
Win	11.	18 March 2011	ITF Sanya, China	Hard	(Croatia) Ani Mijačika	(Japan) Rika Fujiwara (Chinese Taipei) Hsu Wen-hsin	3–6, 7–5, [12–10]
