= Yevgenia Savranska =

Israeli-Ukrainian tennis player

- Native name: יבגניה סברנסקי
- Country (sports): Israel (2000–2007); Ukraine (July 2007–2015)
- Residence: France
- Born: 20 February 1984 (age 42) Ukrainian SSR
- Turned pro: 2000
- Retired: 2015
- Plays: Right (two-handed backhand)
- Prize money: $146,080

Singles
- Career record: 265–184
- Career titles: 8 ITF
- Highest ranking: No. 172 (17 July 2006)

Grand Slam singles results
- Australian Open: Q2 (2007)
- French Open: Q3 (2006)
- Wimbledon: Q2 (2008)
- US Open: Q1 (2006, 2008)

Doubles
- Career record: 122–102
- Career titles: 11 ITF
- Highest ranking: No. 191 (10 July 2006)

Yevgenia Savranska (or Yevgenia Savransky, Hebrew: יבגניה סברנסקי; born 20 February 1984) is an Israeli-Ukrainian former tennis player.

== Career ==
On 17 July 2006, she reached her highest WTA singles ranking of 172 whilst her best doubles ranking was 191, on 10 July 2006. She won eight singles and eleven doubles titles on the ITF Women's Circuit in her career.

Playing for Israel Fed Cup team, Savranska has a win–loss record of 0–1.

She made her WTA Tour doubles main-draw debut at the 2008 Internationaux de Strasbourg, partnering Mihaela Buzărnescu.

Savranska made her WTA Tour singles debut at the 2009 Barcelona Ladies Open, defeating Lucie Hradecká, Gréta Arn and Émilie Loit in the qualifying tournament for a place in the main draw. However, she was defeated in the first round by former world No. 7, Nicole Vaidišová, 6–2, 6–4.

Savranska received Ukrainian citizenship in July 2007. She retired from tennis in November 2015.

== ITF Circuit finals ==
=== Singles: 17 (8 titles, 9 runner-ups) ===
Legend $25,000 tournaments $10,000 tournaments	Finals by surface Hard (4–6) Clay (4–3)

Result	No.	Date	Tournament	Surface	Opponent	Score
Loss	1.	20 November 2000	ITF Beersheba, Israel	Hard	(Israel) Tzipora Obziler	1–4, 0–4, 4–2, 0–4
Loss	2.	21 May 2001	ITF Tel Aviv, Israel	Hard	(Netherlands) Marielle Hoogland	7–6^{(4)}, 6–7^{(5)}, 2–6
Win	1.	3 December 2001	ITF Ashkelon, Israel	Hard	(United Kingdom) Chantal Coombs	4–6, 6–3, 6–0
Win	2.	4 February 2002	ITF Faro, Portugal	Hard	(Italy) Giulia Meruzzi	6–3, 6–1
Win	3.	19 May 2002	ITF Tel Aviv, Israel	Hard	(Israel) Shahar Pe'er	7–5, 1–6, 6–4
Loss	3.	9 July 2002	ITF Sezze, Italy	Clay	(Switzerland) Laura Bao	3–6, 6–7^{(4)}
Win	4.	9 September 2002	ITF Cuneo, Italy	Clay	(Italy) Vittoria Maglio	6–1, 6–3
Win	5.	6 October 2002	ITF Haifa, Israel	Hard	(Israel) Maria Gugel	6–0, 6–0
Loss	4.	13 October 2002	ITF Ramat HaSharon, Israel	Hard	(Hungary) Zsuzsanna Babos	3–6, 6–2, 2–6
Loss	5.	24 May 2004	ITF Istanbul, Turkey	Hard	(Czech Republic) Hana Šromová	4–6, 1–6
Loss	6.	29 August 2004	ITF Timișoara, Romania	Clay	(Romania) Simona Matei	3–6, 3–6
Loss	7.	8 November 2004	ITF Ramat HaSharon, Israel	Hard	(Slovakia) Lenka Dlhopolcová	1–6, 7–6^{(6)}, 0–6
Win	6.	6 September 2005	ITF Durmersheim, Germany	Clay	(Germany) Adriana Barna	2–6, 7–5, 6–1
Win	7.	2 July 2006	ITF Périgueux, France	Clay	(France) Pauline Parmentier	1–6, 7–6^{(3)}, 6–2
Win	8.	3 July 2006	ITF Stuttgart, Germany	Clay	(Romania) Monica Niculescu	7–6^{(4)}, 7–5
Loss	8.	18 February 2008	ITF Clearwater, United States	Hard	(Russia) Regina Kulikova	4–6, 4–6
Loss	9.	30 June 2008	ITF Stuttgart, Germany	Clay	(Germany) Stephanie Gehrlein	0–6, 2–6

=== Doubles: 26 (11 titles, 15 runner-ups) ===
Legend $50,000 tournaments $25,000 tournaments $10,000 tournaments	Finals by surface Hard (4–6) Clay (6–9) Carpet (1–0)

Result	No.	Date	Tournament	Surface	Partner	Opponents	Score
Loss	1.	14 May 2001	ITF Tel Aviv, Israel	Hard	(Moldova) Evghenia Ablovatchi	(Russia) Irina Kornienko (Greece) Maria Pavlidou	2–6, 4–6
Loss	2.	13 August 2001	ITF Bucharest, Romania	Clay	(Russia) Galina Voskoboeva	(Ukraine) Olena Antypina (Ukraine) Yuliana Fedak	6–4, 1–6, 4–6
Loss	3.	3 December 2001	ITF Ashkelon, Israel	Hard	(Israel) Yael Glitzenshtein	(United Kingdom) Chantal Coombs (Republic of Ireland) Elsa O'Riain	5–7, 3–6
Win	1.	4 March 2002	ITF Makarska, Croatia	Clay	(Slovenia) Tina Hergold	(Croatia) Ivana Abramović (Czech Republic) Lenka Tvarošková	5–7, 6–3, 7–5
Win	2.	11 March 2002	ITF Makarska, Croatia	Clay	(Slovenia) Tina Hergold	(Italy) Silvia Disderi (Czech Republic) Zuzana Hejdová	6–3, 7–5
Loss	4.	10 June 2002	ITF Vaduz, Liechtenstein	Clay	(Germany) Stefanie Weis	(Czech Republic) Olga Vymetálková (Czech Republic) Gabriela Chmelinová	5–7, 1–6
Loss	5.	9 July 2002	ITF Sezze, Italy	Clay	(Slovakia) Martina Babáková	(France) Kildine Chevalier (France) Aurélie Védy	3–6, 5–7
Win	3.	14 July 2002	ITF Le Touquet, France	Clay	(Moldova) Evghenia Ablovatchi	(France) Audrey Hernandez (France) Amandine Singla	6–2, 6–3
Loss	6.	9 September 2002	ITF Cuneo, Italy	Clay	(Italy) Stefania Chieppa	(France) Karla Mraz (France) Aurélie Védy	6–2, 3–6, 2–6
Win	4.	13 October 2002	ITF Ramat HaSharon, Israel	Hard	(Israel) Yael Glitzenshtein	(United Kingdom) Melissa Berry (United Kingdom) Natalie Neri	6–7^{(4)}, 6–2, 6–3
Loss	7.	5 October 2003	ITF Vertou, France	Hard (i)	(Belarus) Iryna Kuryanovich	(New Zealand) Eden Marama (New Zealand) Paula Marama	4–6, 2–6
Loss	8.	9 November 2003	ITF Villenave-d'Ornon, France	Clay (i)	(Belarus) Iryna Kuryanovich	(Belgium) Caroline Maes (France) Aurélie Védy	3–6, 6–7^{(6)}
Win	5.	24 May 2004	ITF Istanbul, Turkey	Hard	(Belarus) Iryna Kuryanovich	(Czech Republic) Hana Šromová (Spain) Gabriela Velasco Andreu	6–3, 6–4
Win	6.	19 July 2004	ITF Horb, Germany	Hard	(Russia) Maria Arkhipova	(Czech Republic) Janette Bejlková (China) Yuan Meng	6–4, 6–3
Loss	9.	30 August 2004	ITF Arad, Romania	Clay	(Czech Republic) Sandra Záhlavová	(Romania) Sorana Cîrstea (Romania) Gabriela Niculescu	2–6, 2–6
Loss	10.	17 October 2004	ITF Lagos Nigeria	Hard	(Switzerland) Karin Schlapbach	(Jamaica) Alanna Broderick (South Africa) Surina De Beer	5–7, 2–6
Win	7.	4 July 2005	ITF Toruń, Poland	Clay	(Belarus) Nadejda Ostrovskaya	(Czech Republic) Zuzana Hejdová (Poland) Joanna Sakowicz-Kostecka	6–1, 7–5
Win	8.	18 July 2005	ITF Les Contamines, France	Hard	(Belarus) Nadejda Ostrovskaya	(Russia) Nina Bratchikova (Russia) Ekaterina Kosminskaya	6–1, 2–6, 6–4
Loss	11.	23 August 2005	ITF Moscow, Russia	Clay	(Belarus) Nadejda Ostrovskaya	(Russia) Ekaterina Kozhokina (Belarus) Darya Kustova	2–6, 4–6
Loss	12.	21 March 2006	ITF Redding, United States	Hard	(United Kingdom) Elena Baltacha	(Russia) Vasilisa Bardina (United States) Ahsha Rolle	7–5, 5–7, 4–6
Loss	13.	8 May 2006	ITF Monzón, Spain	Hard	(Poland) Olga Brózda	(Australia) Monique Adamczak (Germany) Annette Kolb	5–7, 3–6
Win	9.	17 July 2006	ITF Darmstadt, Germany	Clay	(Romania) Monica Niculescu	(Austria) Daniela Klemenschits (Austria) Sandra Klemenschits	1–6, 6–0, 6–1
Win	10.	29 January 2007	ITF Belfort, France	Carpet (i)	(Belarus) Iryna Kuryanovich	(Czech Republic) Veronika Chvojková (Czech Republic) Eva Hrdinová	6–3, 7–5
Win	11.	15 April 2007	ITF Biarritz, France	Clay	(Russia) Evgeniya Rodina	(Russia) Ekaterina Lopes (Belarus) Iryna Kuryanovich	2–6, 6–1, 6–3
Loss	14.	1 July 2007	ITF Périgueux, France	Clay	(Ukraine) Yuliya Beygelzimer	(Czech Republic) Eva Hrdinová (Canada) Marie-Ève Pelletier	6–3, 5–7, 1–6
Loss	15.	17 September 2007	ITF Madrid, Spain	Clay	(Romania) Monica Niculescu	(Spain) María José Martínez Sánchez (Spain) Arantxa Parra Santonja	1–6, 6–7^{(4)}

== Fed Cup participation ==
=== Doubles ===
Edition	Round	Date	Location	Against	Surface	Partner	Opponents	W/L	Score
2003 Fed Cup	Europe/Africa Zone	21 April 2003	Estoril, Portugal	(Serbia and Montenegro) Yugoslavia	Clay	Tzipora Obziler	Katarina Mišić; Dragana Zarić	L	3–6, 6–7^{(5)}
