= Raissa Gourevitch =

Russian tennis player

Raisa Gurevich
- Country (sports): Russia
- Born: 1 March 1984 (age 42)
- Turned pro: 1999
- Retired: 2010
- Plays: Right (two-handed backhand)
- Prize money: $23,965

Singles
- Career record: 60–66
- Highest ranking: No. 396 (24 September 2001)

Doubles
- Career record: 112–53
- Career titles: 12 ITF
- Highest ranking: No. 257 (2 February 2004)

Raissa Gourevitch (Russian: Раиса Гуревич, born 1 March 1984) is a former Russian tennis player.

In her career, she won twelve doubles titles on the ITF Women's Circuit. On 24 September 2001, she reached her best singles ranking of world No. 396. On 2 February 2004, she peaked at No. 257 in the doubles rankings.

She made her WTA Tour main-draw debut at the 2001 Tashkent Open in the doubles event, partnering Yuliya Beygelzimer.

Gourevitch retired from the professional tour in 2010.

== ITF finals ==
$25,000 tournaments
$10,000 tournaments

=== Singles (0–1) ===
Result	Date	Tournament	Surface	Opponent	Score
Loss	21 May 2001	ITF Casale Monferrato, Italy	Clay	(Romania) Andreea Ehritt-Vanc	3–6, 4–6

=== Doubles (12–12) ===
Result	Date	Location	Surface	Partner	Opponents	Score
Win	18 September 2000	Moscow, Russia	Carpet (i)	(Russia) Galina Fokina	(Belarus) Darya Kustova (Russia) Alexandra Zerkalova	6–1, 6–0
Loss	30 October 2000	Minsk, Belarus	Carpet (i)	(Russia) Liudmila Nikoyan	(Czech Republic) Eva Birnerová (Russia) Alexandra Zerkalova	4–2, 5–3, 3–5, 2–4, 0–4
Loss	29 January 2001	Mallorca, Spain	Clay	(Russia) Dinara Safina	(Italy) Germana Di Natale (Romania) Andreea Ehritt-Vanc	5–7, 6–3, 4–6
Win	17 June 2001	Canet-en-Roussillon, France	Clay	(Mexico) María José López	(Spain) Sonia Delgado (Spain) Veronica Rizhik	4–6, 7–5, 6–4
Loss	8 July 2001	Getxo, Spain	Clay	(Spain) Anna Font	(Argentina) Luciana Masante (Uruguay) Daniela Olivera	2–6, 3–6
Loss	15 April 2003	Cavtat, Croatia	Clay	(Russia) Nina Bratchikova	(Bosnia and Herzegovina) Mervana Jugić-Salkić (Croatia) Darija Jurak	4–6, 4–6
Win	12 May 2003	Monzón, Spain	Hard	(Ukraine) Olena Antypina	(Romania) Liana Ungur (France) Kildine Chevalier	3–6, 7–5, 6–1
Loss	10 August 2003	Vigo, Spain	Hard	(Uzbekistan) Ivanna Israilova	(Spain) Marta Fraga (Spain) María Pilar Sánchez Alayeto	w/o
Win	1 December 2003	Cairo, Egypt	Clay	(Russia) Ekaterina Kozhokina	(Romania) Julia Gandia (Spain) Gabriela Velasco Andreu	2–6, 6–3, 6–1
Win	8 December 2003	Cairo, Egypt	Clay	(Russia) Ekaterina Bychkova	(New Zealand) Eden Marama (New Zealand) Paula Marama	6–0, 7–6^{(7–2)}
Loss	15 December 2003	Cairo, Egypt	Clay	(Russia) Ekaterina Kozhokina	(New Zealand) Eden Marama (New Zealand) Paula Marama	3–6, 0–6
Win	24 January 2004	Manama, Bahrain	Hard	(Russia) Ekaterina Kozhokina	(Portugal) Frederica Piedade (Greece) Christina Zachariadou	6–4, 6–4
Loss	22 March 2004	Cairo, Egypt	Clay	(Russia) Ekaterina Kozhokina	(Czech Republic) Eva Martincová (Czech Republic) Hana Šromová	1–6, 0–6
Win	30 March 2004	Cairo, Egypt	Clay	(Russia) Ekaterina Kozhokina	(Ukraine) Olena Antypina (Armenia) Liudmila Nikoyan	6–2, 6–0
Loss	27 April 2004	Bournemouth, UK	Clay	(Russia) Ekaterina Kozhokina	(Australia) Jaslyn Hewitt (South Africa) Nicole Rencken	1–6, 6–7^{(3–7)}
Loss	4 May 2004	Edinburgh, UK	Clay	(Russia) Ekaterina Kozhokina	(United Kingdom) Anna Hawkins (South Africa) Nicole Rencken	6–7^{(3–7)}, 2–6
Loss	23 November 2004	Cairo, Egypt	Clay	(Russia) Galina Fokina	(Czech Republic) Petra Cetkovská (France) Pauline Parmentier	4–6, 2–6
Loss	29 November 2004	Cairo, Egypt	Clay	(Russia) Galina Fokina	(Serbia and Montenegro) Katarina Mišić (Serbia and Montenegro) Dragana Zarić	5–7, 4–6
Loss	6 December 2004	Cairo, Egypt	Clay	(Russia) Galina Fokina	(Serbia and Montenegro) Katarina Mišić (Serbia and Montenegro) Dragana Zarić	2–6, 2–6
Win	28 March 2005	Cairo, Egypt	Clay	(Russia) Galina Fokina	(Ukraine) Kateryna Herth (Ukraine) Maryna Khomenko	6–2, 6–1
Win	14 November 2005	Giza, Egypt	Clay	(Russia) Galina Fokina	(South Africa) Lizaan du Plessis (Netherlands) Leonie Mekel	6–3, 6–1
Win	22 November 2005	Giza, Egypt	Clay	(Russia) Galina Fokina	(Italy) Emilia Desiderio (Austria) Stefanie Haidner	6–4, 6–3
Win	28 November 2005	Giza, Egypt	Clay	(Russia) Galina Fokina	(Romania) Lenore Lazaroiu (Bulgaria) Biljana Pawlowa-Dimitrova	6–3, 7–5
Win	28 March 2006	Cairo, Egypt	Clay	(Russia) Galina Fokina	(Romania) Laura Ioana Andrei (Serbia) Vojislava Lukić	7–6^{(9–7)}, 5–7, 6–4
