= Olga Lazarchuk =

Ukrainian tennis player

- Full name: Olga Viktorovna Lazarchuk
- Country (sports): Ukraine
- Born: 3 December 1981 (age 43); Ukraine
- Turned pro: 1997
- Retired: 2014
- Plays: Right-handed (two-handed backhand)
- Prize money: $67,944

Singles
- Career record: 126–73
- Career titles: 4 ITF
- Highest ranking: No. 146 (9 May 2005)

Grand Slam singles results
- Australian Open: Q1 (2005)
- French Open: Q1 (2005)
- US Open: Q2 (2004)

Doubles
- Career record: 33–47
- Career titles: 1 ITF
- Highest ranking: No. 326 (13 September 2004)

Olga Viktorovna Lazarchuk (Ukrainian: Ольга Вікторівна Лазарчук; born 3 December 1981) is a Ukrainian former tennis player.

Her highest WTA singles ranking is 146, which she reached on 9 May 2005. Her career-high in doubles is 326, which she reached on 13 September 2004. Lazarchuk who's favourite court was clay, won four singles titles and one doubles title on the ITF Women's Circuit.

She took part in the 2005 Hyderabad Open qualifying but retired in the second round to Mandy Minella.

Lazarchuk played her last match on the circuit 2005. She finally retired from professional tennis in 2014.

== ITF Circuit finals ==
Legend
$100,000 tournaments
$75,000 tournaments
$50,000 tournaments
$25,000 tournaments
$10,000 tournaments

=== Singles (4–2) ===
Result	No.	Date	Tournament	Surface	Opponent	Score
Loss	1.	18 June 2000	ITF Kędzierzyn-Koźle, Poland	Clay	(Czech Republic) Zuzana Ondrášková	5–7, 4–6
Win	2.	25 May 2003	ITF Lviv, Ukraine	Clay	(Ukraine) Mariya Koryttseva	6–4, 6–0
Win	3.	8 June 2003	ITF Ankara, Turkey	Clay	(Poland) Monika Schneider	6–4, 6–4
Win	4.	13 September 2004	ITF Tbilisi, Georgia	Clay	(Slovakia) Katarína Kachlíková	6–2, 6–2
Loss	5.	1 May 2005	ITF Lafayette, United States	Clay	(Romania) Edina Gallovits-Hall	2–6, 6–7^{(6–8)}
Win	6.	8 May 2005	ITF Raleigh, United States	Clay	(United States) Mary Gambale	6–3, 6–1

=== Doubles (1–3) ===
Result	No.	Date	Tournament	Surface	Partner	Opponents	Score
Loss	1.	18 June 2000	ITF Kędzierzyn-Koźle, Poland	Clay	(Ukraine) Elena Kovalchuk	(Ukraine) Alona Bondarenko (Ukraine) Valeria Bondarenko	4–6, 2–6
Loss	2.	1 June 2003	ITF Warsaw, Poland	Clay	(France) Iryna Brémond	(Ukraine) Alona Bondarenko (Ukraine) Valeria Bondarenko	3–6, 4–6
Win	3.	8 June 2003	ITF Ankara, Turkey	Clay	(Russia) Svetlana Mossiakova	(Spain) Gabriela Velasco Andreu (Russia) Julia Efremova	6–4, 6–1
Loss	4.	8 September 2003	ITF Turin, Italy	Clay	(Ukraine) Yuliana Fedak	(Bosnia and Herzegovina) Mervana Jugić-Salkić (Croatia) Darija Jurak	4–6, 2–6
