= Ekaterina Bychkova =

Russian tennis player

Ekaterina Bychkova Екатерина Бычкова
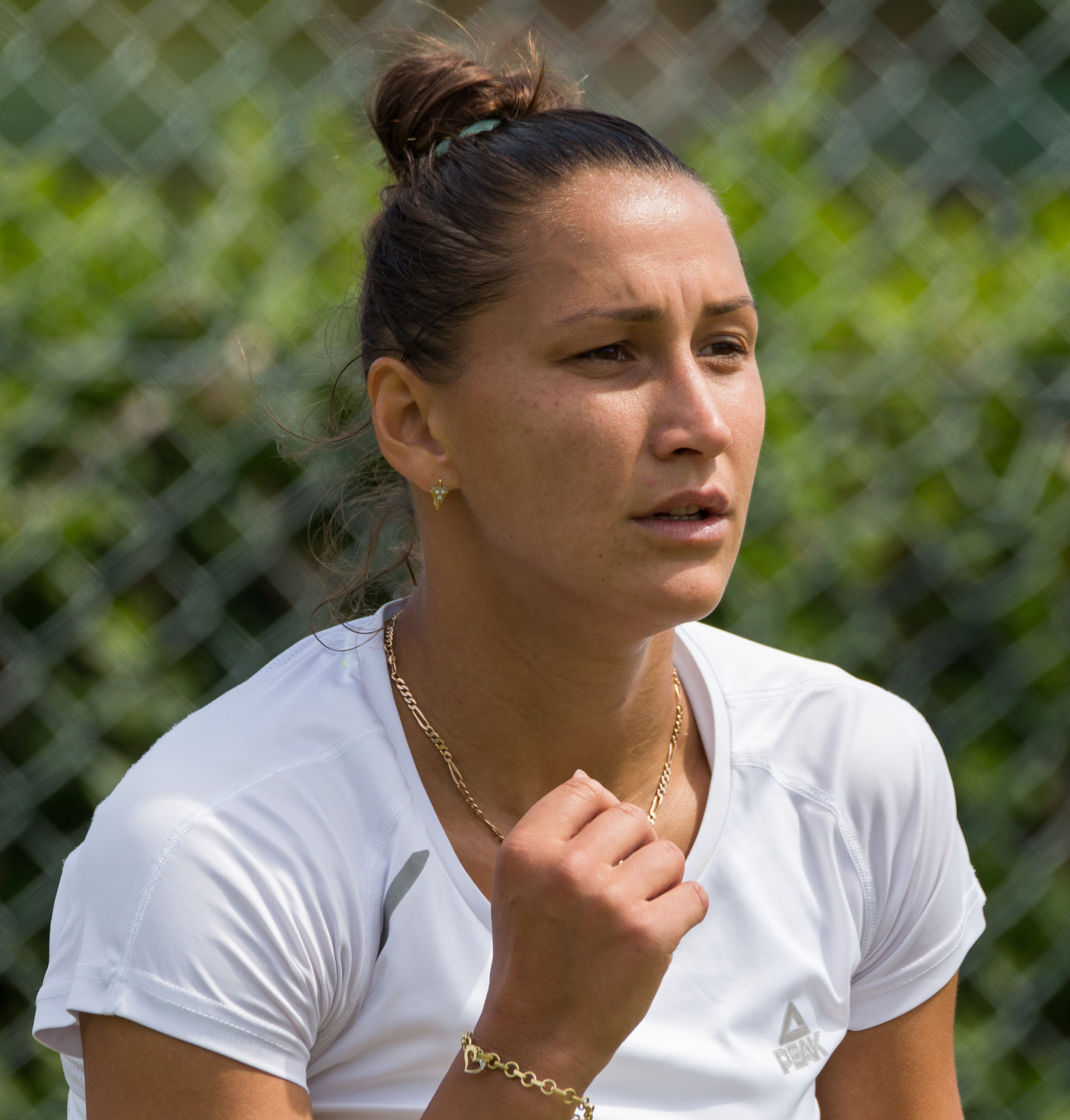
- Bychkova at the 2015 Wimbledon qualifying
- Full name: Ekaterina Andreevna Bychkova
- Country (sports): Russia
- Residence: Moscow, Russia
- Born: 5 June 1985 (age 40) Moscow, Soviet Union
- Height: 1.71 m (5 ft 7 in)
- Turned pro: 2000
- Retired: 2017–2021
- Plays: Right-handed (two-handed backhand)
- Prize money: $1,001,619

Singles
- Career record: 394–330
- Career titles: 10 ITF
- Highest ranking: No. 66 (20 February 2006)

Grand Slam singles results
- Australian Open: 2R (2006)
- French Open: 1R (2006, 2007, 2008, 2010)
- Wimbledon: 2R (2006)
- US Open: 2R (2005, 2006, 2007, 2008)

Doubles
- Career record: 139–165
- Career titles: 5 ITF
- Highest ranking: No. 106 (29 January 2007)

Grand Slam doubles results
- Australian Open: 2R (2007)
- French Open: 2R (2006)
- US Open: 1R (2006)

Ekaterina Andreevna Bychkova (Екатерина Андреевна Бычкова; born 5 June 1985) is a Russian former professional tennis player.

== Career ==
In her career, Bychkova won ten singles and five doubles titles on the ITF Women's Circuit. On 20 February 2006, she reached her best singles ranking of world No. 66. On 29 January 2007, she peaked at No. 106 in the doubles rankings. Bychkova defeated defending champion Svetlana Kuznetsova in the first round of the 2005 US Open.

She was coached by her mother, Liudmila Bychkova. Her father's name is Andrey Bychkov. Introduced to tennis by her mother, she began playing at the Spartak and Chajka tennis clubs. She currently coaches players and commentates with Eurosport.

She co-hosted, with Irish-born Russia-based sportsperson, sports journalist and administrator Alan Moore, on Capital Sports from 2017 to 2018. She also reported for The Bookmaker Ratings. Bychkova returned to the circuit in February 2021, competing on the ITF Women's World Tour until October 2021.

== ITF Circuit finals ==
$100,000 tournaments
$75,000 tournaments
$50,000 tournaments
$25,000 tournaments
$10,000 tournaments

=== Singles: 17 (10 titles, 7 runner-ups) ===
Result	No.	Date	Tournament	Surface	Opponent	Score
Win	1.	14 December 2003	ITF Cairo, Egypt	Clay	(Spain) Gabriela Velasco Andreu	6–1, 6–4
Win	2.	4 July 2004	ITF Krasnoarmeisk, Russia	Hard	(Russia) Olga Panova	6–2, 6–3
Win	3.	23 August 2004	ITF Moscow, Russia	Clay	(Russia) Maria Kondratieva	6–2, 6–1
Loss	4.	3 October 2004	ITF Belgrade, Serbia	Clay	(Hungary) Virág Németh	6–2, 2–6, 2–6
Loss	5.	19 December 2004	ITF Bergamo, Italy	Carpet (i)	(Netherlands) Michaëlla Krajicek	4–6, 3–6
Win	6.	27 March 2005	Neva Cup St. Petersburg, Russia	Hard (i)	(Finland) Emma Laine	6–1, 6–2
Loss	7.	1 May 2005	Open de Cagnes-sur-Mer, France	Clay	(Spain) Laura Pous Tió	6–7^{(4)}, 6–4
Win	8.	17 December 2005	ITF Bergamo, Italy	Carpet (i)	(Bosnia and Herzegovina) Mervana Jugić-Salkić	6–3, 6–0
Win	9.	18 June 2006	Open de Marseille, France	Clay	(France) Séverine Beltrame	6–1, 6–2
Loss	10.	3 May 2009	ITF Charlottesville, United States	Clay	(United States) Lindsay Lee-Waters	3–6, 5–7
Win	11.	19 June 2009	Open Contrexéville, France	Clay	(Germany) Kathrin Wörle-Scheller	6–4, 6–4
Loss	12.	26 July 2009	ITF Pétange, Luxembourg	Clay	(Spain) Arantxa Parra Santonja	3–6, 2–6
Win	13.	7 August 2010	ITF Moscow, Russia	Clay	(Belarus) Darya Kustova	6–2, 7–5
Loss	14.	26 March 2011	ITF Namangan, Uzbekistan	Hard	(Bosnia and Herzegovina) Jasmina Tinjić	6–7, 6–2, 6–7
Win	15.	14 April 2013	ITF Edgbaston, UK	Hard (i)	(Italy) Angelica Moratelli	6–4, 6–3
Win	16.	23 February 2014	ITF Nottingham, UK	Hard (i)	(France) Pauline Parmentier	3–0 ret.
Loss	17.	28 April 2014	Kangaroo Cup, Japan	Hard	(Hungary) Tímea Babos	1–6, 2–6

=== Doubles: 15 (5 titles, 10 runner-ups) ===
Result	Date	Tier	Tournament	Surface	Partner	Opponents	Score
Win	8 December 2003	10,000	ITF Cairo, Egypt	Clay	(Russia) Raissa Gourevitch	(New Zealand) Eden Marama (New Zealand) Paula Marama	6–0, 7–6^{(2)}
Win	4 July 2004	10,000	ITF Krasnoarmeisk, Russia	Hard	(Russia) Vasilisa Davydova	(Russia) Vasilisa Bardina (Russia) Julia Efremova	7–6^{(4)}, 6–0
Loss	27 September 2004	25,000	ITF Belgrade, Serbia	Clay	(Belarus) Nadejda Ostrovskaya	(Italy) Giulia Casoni (Croatia) Darija Jurak	0–6, 2–6
Win	18 December 2005	50,000	ITF Bergamo, Italy	Carpet (i)	(Russia) Marina Shamayko	(Italy) Valentina Sassi (Italy) Francesca Lubiani	6–1, 6–3
Loss	8 March 2009	25,000	ITF Fort Walton Beach, U.S.	Hard	(Belarus) Ekaterina Dzehalevich	(Russia) Alexandra Panova (Belarus) Tatiana Poutchek	2–6, 2–6
Loss	26 April 2009	75,000	ITF Dothan, United States	Clay	(Russia) Alexandra Panova	(United States) Julie Ditty (United States) Carly Gullickson	6–2, 1–6, [6–10]
Loss	5 April 2010	50,000	ITF Torhout, Belgium	Hard (i)	(Czech Republic) Hana Birnerová	(Germany) Mona Barthel (Germany) Justine Ozga	5–7, 2–6
Loss	25 October 2010	25,000	ITF İstanbul, Turkey	Hard	(France) Iryna Brémond	(Georgia (country)) Oksana Kalashnikova (Russia) Marta Sirotkina	3–6, 1–6
Win	8 November 2010	25,000	ITF Minsk, Belarus	Hard (i)	(Russia) Elena Bovina	(Poland) Paula Kania (Poland) Katarzyna Piter	6–4, 6–0
Loss	26 March 2011	25,000	ITF Namangan, Uzbekistan	Hard	(Russia) Marina Shamayko	(Uzbekistan) Albina Khabibulina (Uzbekistan) Nigina Abduraimova	6–4, 6–7^{(3)}, [8–10]
Loss	14 April 2012	25,000	ITF Pelham, United States	Clay	(Russia) Elena Bovina	(France) Julie Coin (Canada) Marie-Ève Pelletier	5–7, 4–6
Win	28 April 2013	50,000	ITF İstanbul, Turkey	Hard	(Ukraine) Nadiia Kichenok	(Turkey) Başak Eraydın (Bulgaria) Aleksandrina Naydenova	3–6, 6–2, [10–5]
Loss	14 April 2014	25,000	ITF Qarshi, Uzbekistan	Hard	(Russia) Veronika Kudermetova	(Uzbekistan) Albina Khabibulina (Ukraine) Anastasiya Vasylyeva	6–2, 5–7, [4–10]
Loss	26 May 2014	25,000	ITF Moscow, Russia	Hard	(Russia) Evgeniya Rodina	(Kazakhstan) Anna Danilina (Switzerland) Xenia Knoll	3–6, 2–6
Loss	6 April 2015	25,000	GB Pro-Series Barnstaple, UK	Hard (i)	(United Kingdom) Naomi Broady	(France) Stéphanie Foretz (Croatia) Ana Vrljić	2–6, 7–5, [7–10]
