= Eden Marama =

New Zealand tennis player

- Country (sports): New Zealand
- Born: 13 February 1986 (age 40) Wellington, New Zealand
- Turned pro: 2002
- Retired: 2006
- Plays: Right-handed (two-handed backhand)
- Prize money: $16,277

Singles
- Career record: 48–23
- Career titles: 3 ITF
- Highest ranking: No. 321 (22 March 2004)

Doubles
- Career record: 41–12
- Career titles: 8 ITF
- Highest ranking: No. 301 (26 April 2004)

Eden Marama (born 13 February 1986) is a retired New Zealand female tennis player.

In her career, she won three singles titles and eight doubles titles on the ITF circuit. On 22 March 2004, she reached her best singles ranking of world No. 321. On 26 April 2004, she peaked at No. 301 in the doubles rankings.

Playing for New Zealand Fed Cup team, Marama has a win–loss record of 4–6.

== ITF circuit finals ==
$100,000 tournaments
$75,000 tournaments
$50,000 tournaments
$25,000 tournaments
$10,000 tournaments

=== Singles: 3 (3–0) ===
Result	Date	Tournament	Surface	Opponent	Score
Win	27 July 2003	Dublin, Ireland	Carpet	(Republic of Ireland) Karen Nugent	6–1, 6–2
Win	5 October 2003	Vertou, France	Hard (i)	(France) Pascale Leroy	4–6, 6–0, 6–1
Win	9 March 2004	Benalla, Australia	Grass	(Australia) Cindy Watson	6–3, 4–6, 6–4

=== Doubles: 9 (8–1) ===
Result	Date	Tournament	Surface	Partner	Opponents	Score
Win	16 June 2003	Montemor-o-Novo, Portugal	Hard	(New Zealand) Paula Marama	(Hungary) Zsuzsanna Babos (Spain) Gabriela Velasco Andreu	6–7^{(5–7)}, 6–3, 6–0
Win	27 July 2003	Dublin, Ireland	Carpet	(New Zealand) Paula Marama	(Republic of Ireland) Yvonne Doyle (Republic of Ireland) Karen Nugent	6–4, 7–5
Win	22 September 2003	Volos, Greece	Grass	(New Zealand) Paula Marama	(Romania) Laura-Ramona Husaru (Ukraine) Viktoria Lytovchenko	6–2, 6–4
Win	5 October 2003	Vertou, France	Hard (i)	(New Zealand) Paula Marama	(France) Iryna Brémond (Ukraine) Yevgenia Savranska	6–4, 6–2
Loss	8 December 2003	Cairo, Egypt	Clay	(New Zealand) Paula Marama	(Russia) Ekaterina Bychkova (Russia) Raissa Gourevitch	0–6, 6–7^{(2–7)}
Win	15 December 2003	Cairo, Egypt	Clay	(New Zealand) Paula Marama	(Russia) Raissa Gourevitch (Russia) Ekaterina Kozhokina	6–3, 6–0
Win	1 March 2004	Warrnambool, Australia	Grass	(New Zealand) Paula Marama	(Australia) Casey Dellacqua (Australia) Jaslyn Hewitt	6–3, 4–6, 6–2
Win	9 March 2004	Benalla, Australia	Grass	(New Zealand) Paula Marama	(Australia) Lauren Breadmore (United States) Kaysie Smashey	7–5, 6–1
Win	8 August 2004	Wrexham, Wales	Hard	(New Zealand) Paula Marama	(India) Rushmi Chakravarthi (India) Sania Mirza	7–6^{(7–4)}, 7–5
