= Mervana Jugić-Salkić =

Bosnian tennis player (born 1980)

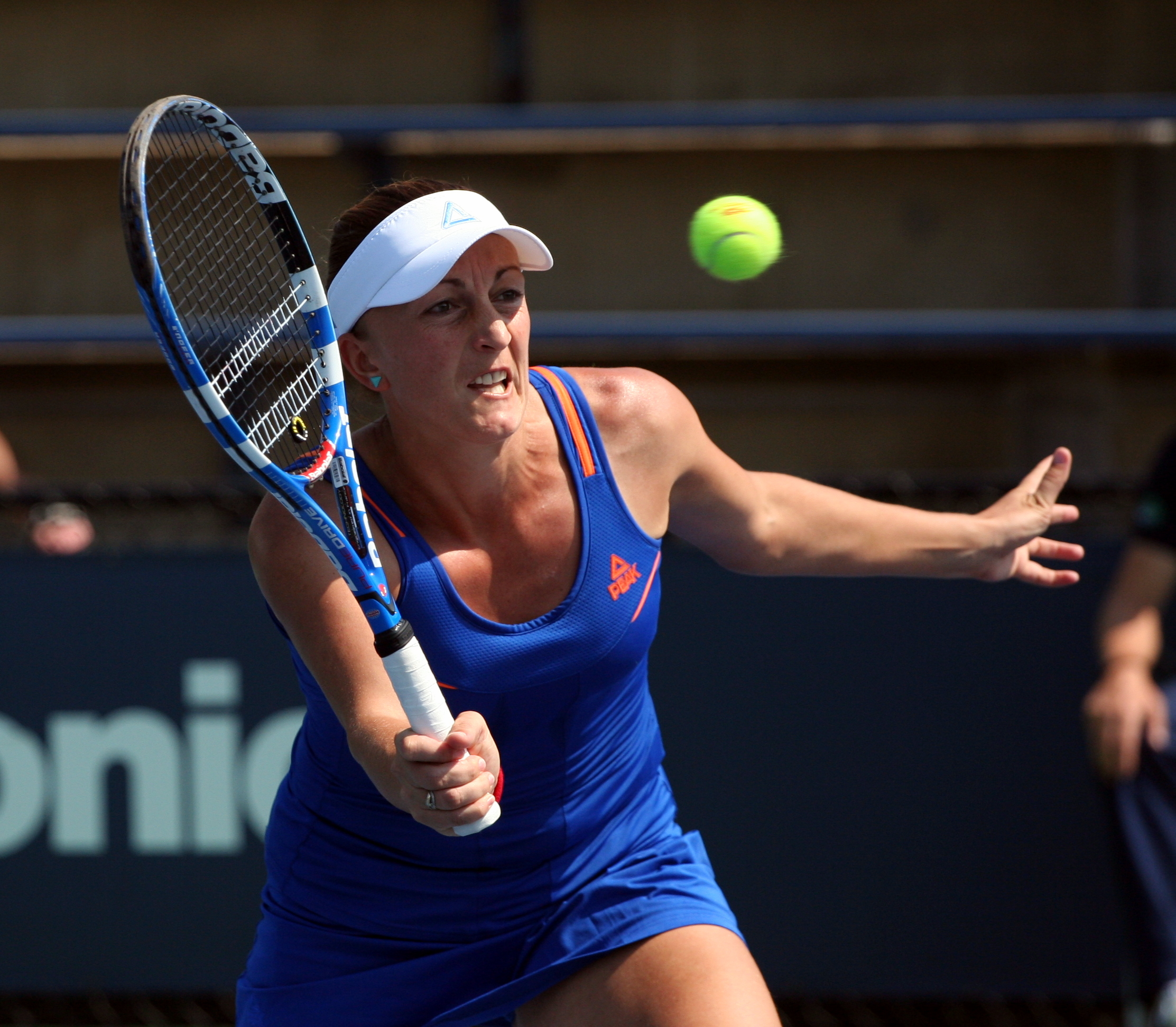
- Country (sports): Bosnia and Herzegovina
- Residence: Zagreb, Croatia
- Born: 14 May 1980 (age 46) Zenica, SR Bosnia and Herzegovina, Yugoslavia
- Height: 1.79 m (5 ft 10 in)
- Turned pro: 1999
- Retired: 2014
- Plays: Right-handed (two-handed backhand)
- Prize money: $535,920

Singles
- Career record: 406–253
- Career titles: 15 ITF
- Highest ranking: No. 99 (21 June 2004)

Grand Slam singles results
- Australian Open: Q2 (2004, 2009, 2013)
- French Open: 1R (2004, 2005)
- Wimbledon: 1R (2004)
- US Open: Q3 (2004)

Doubles
- Career record: 361–188
- Career titles: 2 WTA, 43 ITF
- Highest ranking: No. 59 (10 July 2006)

Grand Slam doubles results
- Australian Open: 2R (2009)
- French Open: 2R (2006)
- Wimbledon: 3R (2006)
- US Open: 2R (2004, 2005, 2012)

Mervana Jugić-Salkić (born 14 May 1980) is a Bosnian former top 100 tennis player. She turned professional in 1999, and reached her highest singles ranking on 21 June 2004, when she was ranked world No. 99. On 10 July 2006, Jugić-Salkić reached world No. 59 in doubles, after winning the Auckland Open in 2004 with Jelena Kostanić, and Internazionali di Modena in 2005 with Yuliya Beygelzimer. She also won 15 singles and 43 doubles events on the ITF Circuit. In her career, she defeated players such as Yan Zi, Victoria Azarenka, Bethanie Mattek, Sania Mirza, Anabel Medina Garrigues, Nuria Llagostera Vives and Sybille Bammer.

== Personal life ==
Jugić-Salkić was born to Hidajet and Hašiha Jugić. She began playing tennis rather late, aged 13, citing Gabriela Sabatini as her idol.

== WTA Tour finals ==
=== Doubles: 4 (2 titles, 2 runner-ups) ===
Legend
Grand Slam tournaments
Premier M & Premier 5
Premier
International (2–2)

Result	Date	Tournament	Surface	Partner	Opponents	Score
Win	Jan 2004	Auckland, New Zealand	Clay	(Croatia) Jelena Kostanić	(Argentina) Paola Suárez (Spain) Virginia Ruano Pascual	7–6, 3–6, 6–1
Win	Jul 2005	Modena, Italy	Clay	(Ukraine) Yuliya Beygelzimer	(Czech Republic) Gabriela Navrátilová (Czech Republic) Michaela Paštiková	6–2, 6–0
Loss	Apr 2008	Estoril, Portugal	Clay	(Turkey) İpek Şenoğlu	(Italy) Flavia Pennetta (Russia) Maria Kirilenko	4–6, 4–6
Loss	Jul 2012	Båstad, Sweden	Clay	(Czech Republic) Eva Hrdinová	(Colombia) Catalina Castaño (Colombia) Mariana Duque Mariño	6–4, 5–7, [5–10]

== ITF finals ==
$100,000 tournaments
$75,000 tournaments
$50,000 tournaments
$25,000 tournaments
$10,000 tournaments

=== Singles: 31 (15 titles, 16 runner-ups) ===
Outcome	No.	Date	Tournament	Surface	Opponent	Score
Winner	1.	12 April 1999	ITF Hvar, Croatia	Clay	(Czech Republic) Petra Kučová	6–4, 6–4
Runner-up	1.	19 April 1999	ITF Hvar, Croatia	Clay	(Czech Republic) Petra Kučová	5–7, 3–6
Runner-up	2.	16 August 1999	ITF Maribor, Slovenia	Clay	(Slovakia) Stanislava Hrozenská	6–4, 4–6, 2–6
Runner-up	3.	6 September 1999	ITF Zadar, Croatia	Clay	(Czech Republic) Olga Vymetálková	3–6, 4–6
Winner	2.	13 September 1999	ITF Biograd, Croatia	Clay	(Slovakia) Eva Fislová	6–4, 6–2
Runner-up	4.	12 June 2000	ITF Ankara, Turkey	Clay	(Germany) Stefanie Weiss	7–6, 3–6, 3–6
Winner	3.	18 September 2000	ITF Makarska, Croatia	Clay	(Czech Republic) Gabriela Chmelinová	6–4, 6–2
Winner	4.	2 July 2001	ITF Camaiore, Italy	Clay	(Czech Republic) Zuzana Zemenová	6–0, 6–4
Runner-up	5.	20 May 2002	ITF Rijeka, Croatia	Clay	(Croatia) Ivana Abramović	3–6, 3–6
Winner	5.	30 September 2002	ITF Široki Brijeg, Bosnia and Herzegovina	Clay	(Croatia) Nadja Pavić	6–4, 6–2
Winner	6.	30 June 2003	ITF Stuttgart, Germany	Clay	(Spain) Nuria Llagostera Vives	6–3, 6–0
Winner	7.	25 August 2003	ITF Rimini, Italy	Clay	(Ukraine) Mariya Koryttseva	6–1, 6–3
Runner-up	6.	8 September 2003	ITF Torino, Italy	Clay	(Estonia) Kaia Kanepi	3–6, 3–6
Winner	8.	29 September 2003	ITF Caserta, Italy	Clay	(Hungary) Virág Németh	6–7, 3–1 ret.
Runner-up	7.	8 December 2003	ITF Ostrava, Czech Republic	Clay (i)	(France) Capucine Rousseau	2–6, 6–7
Runner-up	8.	5 April 2004	ITF Makarska, Croatia	Clay	(Croatia) Lucia Krželj	2–6, 5–7
Winner	9.	10 January 2005	ITF Stuttgart, Germany	Hard (i)	(Germany) Sabine Klaschka	6–2, 6–2
Winner	10.	17 January 2005	Open de l'Isère, France	Hard (i)	(United Kingdom) Karen Paterson	6–3, 6–1
Runner-up	9.	7 February 2005	ITF Capriolo, Italy	Hard (i)	(Czech Republic) Lucie Šafářová	4–6, 1–6
Winner	11.	28 February 2005	ITF Buchen, Germany	Hard (i)	(Czech Republic) Eva Hrdinová	6–2, 2–0 ret.
Runner-up	10.	12 December 2005	ITF Bergamo, Italy	Carpet (i)	(Russia) Ekaterina Bychkova	3–6, 0–6
Runner-up	11.	10 April 2006	ITF Patras, Greece	Hard	(Estonia) Margit Rüütel	3–6, 6–4, 2–6
Runner-up	12.	26 March 2007	ITF Patras, Greece	Hard	(Estonia) Maret Ani	4–5 ret.
Winner	12.	16 July 2007	ITF Rome, Italy	Clay	(Chinese Taipei) Chan Chin-wei	6–3, 6–4
Runner-up	13.	24 March 2008	ITF La Palma, Spain	Hard	(Germany) Kristina Barrois	1–5 ret.
Winner	13.	25 August 2008	ITF Vlaardingen, Netherlands	Clay	(Italy) Giulia Gabba	6–7, 7–6, 7–5
Winner	14.	1 September 2008	ITF Martina Franca, Italy	Clay	(Italy) Anna Floris	6–4, 4–6, 6–1
Runner-up	14.	22 September 2008	ITF Lecce, Italy	Clay	(Germany) Angelika Rösch	2–6, 7–6, 5–7
Runner-up	15.	11 April 2011	ITF Casablanca, Morocco	Clay	(Kazakhstan) Galina Voskoboeva	7–6, 2–6, 3–6
Winner	15.	30 July 2012	ITF Bad Saulgau, Germany	Clay	(Germany) Carina Witthöft	6–2. 6–4
Runner-up	16.	6 August 2012	Ladies Open Hechingen, Germany	Clay	(Slovenia) Maša Zec Peškirič	0–6, 4–6

=== Doubles: 69 (43 titles, 26 runner-ups) ===
Outcome	No.	Date	Tournament	Surface	Partner	Opponents	Score
Runner-up	1.	14 September 1998	ITF Biograd, Croatia	Clay	(Switzerland) Diane Asensio	(Croatia) Lana Miholcek (Germany) Gréta Arn	3–6, 2–6
Winner	2.	12 June 2000	ITF Ankara, Turkey	Clay	(North Macedonia) Marina Lazarovska	(Bulgaria) Kalina Diankova (Turkey) İpek Şenoğlu	6–2, 0–6, 6–4
Runner-up	3.	11 September 2000	ITF Biograd, Croatia	Clay	(Federal Republic of Yugoslavia) Ljiljana Nanušević	(Austria) Bianca Kamper (Austria) Stefanie Haidner	3–6, 7–5, 5–7
Runner-up	4.	2 April 2001	ITF Makarska, Croatia	Clay	(Czech Republic) Zuzana Hejdová	(Czech Republic) Gabriela Chmelinová (Czech Republic) Petra Kučová	6–1, 2–6, 3–6
Winner	5.	9 July 2001	ITF Sezze, Italy	Clay	(Slovakia) Alena Paulenková	(Argentina) Marisol Berengeno (Italy) Margot Torre	6–0, 6–1
Runner-up	6.	30 September 2002	ITF Široki Brijeg, Bosnia and Herzegovina	Clay	(Slovakia) Katarína Kachlíková	(Czech Republic) Lenka Snajdrová (Netherlands) Kika Hogendoorn	2–6, 6–4, 4–6
Winner	7.	18 November 2002	ITF Zagreb, Croatia	Hard	(Croatia) Karolina Šprem	(Croatia) Jelena Kostanić (Croatia) Matea Mezak	6–2, 6–4
Winner	8.	7 April 2003	ITF Cavtat, Croatia	Clay	(Croatia) Darija Jurak	(Russia) Nina Bratchikova (Russia) Raissa Gourevitch	6–4, 6–4
Winner	9.	14 April 2003	ITF Dubrovnik, Croatia	Clay	(Croatia) Darija Jurak	(Romania) Gabriela Niculescu (Romania) Monica Niculescu	6–2, 4–6, 6–2
Winner	10.	19 May 2003	ITF Biograd, Croatia	Clay	(Croatia) Darija Jurak	(Czech Republic) Paulina Slitrová (Czech Republic) Petra Cetkovská	6–4, 6–4
Winner	11.	26 May 2003	ITF Zadar, Croatia	Clay	(Croatia) Darija Jurak	(Austria) Daniela Klemenschits (Austria) Sandra Klemenschits	6–3, 6–1
Winner	12.	9 June 2003	Grado Tennis Cup, Italy	Clay	(Croatia) Darija Jurak	(Italy) Laura Dell'Angelo (Italy) Giorgia Mortello	2–6, 6–3, 6–0
Winner	13.	4 August 2003	ITF Cuneo, Italy	Clay	(Croatia) Darija Jurak	(Austria) Stefanie Haidner (Bulgaria) Lubomira Bacheva	6–1, 6–2
Winner	14.	11 August 2003	ITF Martina Franca, Italy	Clay	(Croatia) Darija Jurak	(Spain) María José Martínez Sánchez (Spain) Paula García	2–6, 6–4, 6–1
Winner	15.	25 August 2003	ITF Rimini, Italy	Clay	(Croatia) Darija Jurak	(Italy) Alice Canepa (Italy) Emily Stellato	7–6, 6–7, 7–5
Winner	16.	8 September 2003	ITF Turin, Italy	Clay	(Croatia) Darija Jurak	(Ukraine) Olga Lazarchuk (Ukraine) Yuliana Fedak	6–4, 6–2
Winner	17.	20 October 2003	ITF Saint Raphael, France	Hard (i)	(Croatia) Darija Jurak	(Estonia) Maret Ani (France) Camille Pin	6–2, 6–1
Winner	18.	24 November 2003	ITF Průhonice, Czech Republic	Carpet (i)	(Croatia) Darija Jurak	(Czech Republic) Olga Vymetálková (Czech Republic) Gabriela Chmelinová	7–5, 6–7, 6–3
Runner-up	19.	6 September 2004	ITF Fano, Italy	Clay	(Croatia) Darija Jurak	(Romania) Andreea Ehritt-Vanc (Romania) Delia Sescioreanu	5–7, 6–1, 2–6
Runner-up	20.	20 September 2004	ITF Biella, Italy	Clay	(Croatia) Darija Jurak	(Argentina) Erica Krauth (Germany) Martina Müller	2–6, 3–6
Winner	21.	10 January 2005	ITF Stuttgart, Germany	Hard (i)	(Croatia) Darija Jurak	(Netherlands) Danielle Harmsen (Netherlands) Eva Pera	6–3, 7–5
Winner	22.	17 January 2005	Open de l'Isère, France	Hard (i)	(Croatia) Darija Jurak	(France) Anaïs Laurendon (France) Émilie Bacquet	6–2, 6–2
Runner-up	23.	31 January 2005	ITF Ortisei, Italy	Carpet (i)	(Croatia) Darija Jurak	(Czech Republic) Barbora Záhlavová-Strýcová (Slovenia) Tina Pisnik	2–6, 6–3, 6–7
Winner	24.	28 February 2005	ITF Buchen, Germany	Hard (i)	(Croatia) Darija Jurak	(Germany) Andrea Petkovic (Germany) Korina Perkovic	6–2, 6–2
Winner	25.	18 April 2005	ITF Bari, Italy	Clay	(Austria) Stefanie Haidner	(Italy) Stefania Chieppa (Switzerland) Romina Oprandi	6–3, 7–6
Winner	26.	25 April 2005	ITF Taranto, Italy	Clay	(Croatia) Darija Jurak	(Belarus) Nadejda Ostrovskaya (Belarus) Tatiana Poutchek	6–3, 6–7, 6–3
Winner	27.	20 June 2005	ITF Fontanafredda, Italy	Clay	(Croatia) Darija Jurak	(Slovakia) Eva Fislová (Slovakia) Stanislava Hrozenská	5–7, 6–3, 6–4
Runner-up	28.	26 September 2005	ITF Biella, Italy	Clay	(Estonia) Maret Ani	(Czech Republic) Lucie Hradecká (Czech Republic) Renata Voráčová	4–6, 6–7
Winner	29.	21 November 2005	Internationaux de Poitiers, France	Hard (i)	(Estonia) Maret Ani	(Russia) Nina Bratchikova (Uzbekistan) Akgul Amanmuradova	7–6, 6–1
Runner-up	30.	10 April 2006	ITF Patras, Greece	Hard	(Ukraine) Yana Levchenko	(Australia) Christina Horiatopoulos (Slovakia) Jarmila Gajdošová	1–6, 4–6
Runner-up	31.	31 July 2006	ITF Martina Franca, Italy	Clay	(Romania) Edina Gallovits-Hall	(Italy) Ivana Abramović (France) Aurélie Védy	3–6, 2–6
Winner	32.	14 August 2006	ITF Rimini, Italy	Clay	(Czech Republic) Gabriela Chmelinová	(Belarus) Ekaterina Dzehalevich (Russia) Ekaterina Lopes	6–3, 1–6, 6–2
Winner	33.	23 October 2006	ITF Istanbul, Turkey	Hard	(Turkey) İpek Şenoğlu	(United Kingdom) Katie O'Brien (Romania) Sorana Cîrstea	w/o
Winner	34.	11 December 2006	Dubai Tennis Challenge, United Arab Emirates	Hard	(Croatia) Jelena Kostanić Tošić	(Ukraine) Kateryna Bondarenko (Ukraine) Valeria Bondarenko	6–3, 6–0
Runner-up	35.	12 February 2007	ITF Saint Paul, United States	Hard	(Turkey) İpek Şenoğlu	(Italy) Antonella Serra Zanetti (Sweden) Sofia Arvidsson	6–7, 7–5, 6–7
Runner-up	36.	19 February 2007	ITF Clearwater, United States	Hard	(Italy) Antonella Serra Zanetti	(Japan) Ryōko Fuda (Japan) Seiko Okamoto	7–5, 3–6, 4–6
Runner-up	37.	26 March 2007	ITF Patras, Greece	Hard	(Greece) Anna Koumantou	(Poland) Olga Brózda (Slovakia) Lenka Tvarošková	3–6, 1–3 ret.
Winner	38.	18 June 2007	ITF Fontanafredda, Italy	Clay	(Serbia) Teodora Mirčić	(Germany) Carmen Klaschka (Romania) Magda Mihalache	6–2, 6–1
Runner-up	39.	2 July 2007	ITF Båstad, Sweden	Clay	(Greece) Anna Koumantou	(Serbia) Teodora Mirčić (Sweden) Hanna Nooni	5–7, 5–7
Runner-up	40.	9 July 2007	ITF Biella, Italy	Clay	(Czech Republic) Renata Voráčová	(Estonia) Kaia Kanepi (Estonia) Maret Ani	4–6, 1–6
Runner-up	41.	30 July 2007	ITF Rimini, Italy	Clay	(Serbia) Karolina Jovanović	(Estonia) Maret Ani (Slovenia) Andreja Klepač	4–6, 0–6
Runner-up	42.	3 September 2007	Save Cup, Italy	Clay	(Belarus) Darya Kustova	(Estonia) Margit Rüütel (Russia) Alisa Kleybanova	2–6, 5–7
Winner	43.	22 October 2007	ITF Istanbul, Turkey	Hard	(Turkey) İpek Şenoğlu	(Netherlands) Elise Tamaëla (Netherlands) Kim Kilsdonk	6–1, 6–2
Runner-up	44.	17 March 2008	ITF Tenerife, Spain	Hard	(Israel) Tzipora Obziler	(France) Julie Coin (France) Violette Huck	4–6, 3–6
Winner	45.	21 July 2008	ITF Les Contamines-Montjoie, France	Hard	(Serbia) Teodora Mirčić	(Czech Republic) Darina Sedenková (Germany) Justine Ozga	6–1, 6–4
Winner	46.	4 August 2008	ITF Monteroni d'Arbia, Italy	Clay	(France) Aurélie Védy	(Italy) Valentina Sulpizio (Italy) Verdiana Verardi	6–4, 6–2
Runner-up	47.	11 August 2008	Palić Open, Serbia	Clay	(Serbia) Teodora Mirčić	(Poland) Magdalena Kiszczyńska (Poland) Olga Brózda	3–6, 6–7
Winner	48.	25 August 2008	ITF Vlaardingen, Netherlands	Clay	(Serbia) Teodora Mirčić	(Latvia) Irina Kuzmina-Rimsa (Russia) Anastasia Poltoratskaya	6–1, 6–2
Winner	49.	15 September 2008	Save Cup Mestre, Italy	Clay	(France) Aurélie Védy	(France) Violette Huck (Georgia (country)) Margalita Chakhnashvili	6–2, 6–3
Winner	50.	6 October 2008	Open de Touraine, France	Hard (i)	(Germany) Kristina Barrois	(France) Julie Coin (France) Violette Huck	6–2, 7–6
Runner-up	51.	17 November 2008	ITF Odense, Denmark	Carpet (i)	(Czech Republic) Gabriela Chmelinová	(United Kingdom) Sarah Borwell (United States) Courtney Nagle	4–6, 4–6
Winner	52.	26 April 2010	Open de Cagnes-sur-Mer, France	Clay	(Croatia) Darija Jurak	(France) Kristina Mladenovic (France) Stéphanie Cohen-Aloro	0–6, 6–2, [10–5]
Winner	53.	21 June 2010	ITF Kristinehamn, Sweden	Clay	(Finland) Emma Laine	(Israel) Julia Glushko (Turkey) Pemra Özgen	6–2, 6–3
Winner	54.	28 June 2010	ITF Ystad, Sweden	Clay	(Finland) Emma Laine	(Ukraine) Anastasiya Lytovchenko (Ukraine) Tetyana Arefyeva	6–1, 6–1
Runner-up	55.	1 November 2010	Open Nantes Atlantique, France	Clay (i)	(Croatia) Darija Jurak	(United Kingdom) Anna Smith (United Kingdom) Anne Keothavong	7–5, 1–6, [6–10]
Winner	56.	31 January 2011	Rancho Santa Fe Open, United States	Hard	(United States) Julie Ditty	(Japan) Remi Tezuka (Japan) Shuko Aoyama	6–0, 6–2
Runner-up	57.	14 February 2011	ITF Surprise, United States	Hard	(Ukraine) Tetiana Luzhanska	(Japan) Remi Tezuka (Japan) Shuko Aoyama	3–6, 1–6
Runner-up	58.	14 February 2011	ITF Hammond, United States	Hard	(United Kingdom) Melanie South	(United States) Christina Fusano (United States) Julie Ditty	3–6, 3–6
Winner	59.	20 June 2011	ITF Kristinehamn, Sweden	Clay	(Finland) Emma Laine	(Hungary) Tímea Babos (Russia) Ksenia Lykina	6–4, 6–4
Runner-up	60.	27 June 2011	ITF Ystad, Sweden	Clay	(Finland) Emma Laine	(Romania) Alexandra Cadanțu (Romania) Diana Buzean	4–6, 6–2, [5–10]
Winner	61.	26 September 2011	ITF Clermont-Ferrand, France	Hard (i)	(United Kingdom) Anne Keothavong	(Russia) Ekaterina Ivanova (Russia) Ksenia Lykina	4–6, 6–3, [10–8]
Runner-up	62.	31 October 2011	ITF Istanbul, Turkey	Hard	(Croatia) Ana Vrljić	(Ukraine) Lyudmyla Kichenok (Ukraine) Nadiia Kichenok	6–4, 1–6, [7–10]
Winner	63.	20 February 2012	ITF Mildura, Australia	Grass	(Russia) Ksenia Lykina	(Australia) Stephanie Bengson (Australia) Tyra Calderwood	5–7, 7–5, [10–7]
Runner-up	64.	31 October 2011	ITF La Marsa, Tunisia	Clay	(Austria) Sandra Klemenschits	(Bulgaria) Isabella Shinikova (Norway) Ulrikke Eikeri	3–6, 4–6
Winner	65.	2 July 2012	Internazionali di Biella, Italy	Clay	(Czech Republic) Eva Hrdinová	(Austria) Sandra Klemenschits (Germany) Tatjana Maria	1–6, 6–3, [10–8]
Winner	66.	6 August 2012	Ladies Open Hechingen, Germany	Clay	(Austria) Sandra Klemenschits	(Czech Republic) Renata Voráčov (Russia) Natela Dzalamidze	6–2, 6–3
Winner	67.	22 October 2012	ITF Poitiers, France	Hard (i)	(Colombia) Catalina Castaño	(France) Stéphanie Foretz (Germany) Tatjana Maria	6–4, 5–7, [10–4]
Winner	68.	29 October 2012	Open Nantes, France	Hard (i)	(Colombia) Catalina Castaño	(Czech Republic) Petra Cetkovská (Czech Republic) Renata Voráčová	6–4, 6–4
Winner	69.	6 May 2013	Empire Slovak Open, Slovakia	Clay	(Czech Republic) Renata Voráčová	(Slovakia) Jana Čepelová (Slovakia) Anna Schmiedlová	6–1, 6–1

== Grand Slam performance timelines ==
Key
W	F	SF	QF	#R	RR	Q#	DNQ	A	NH

(W) winner; (F) finalist; (SF) semifinalist; (QF) quarterfinalist; (#R) rounds 4, 3, 2, 1; (RR) round-robin stage; (Q#) qualification round; (DNQ) did not qualify; (A) absent; (NH) not held; (SR) strike rate (events won / competed); (W–L) win–loss record.

=== Singles ===
Tournament	2004	2005	2006	2007	2008	2009	2010	2011	2012	2013
Australian Open	Q2	A	Q1	A	A	Q2	A	A	A	Q2
French Open	1R	1R	Q1	A	A	Q1	A	A	A	Q1
Wimbledon	1R	Q2	Q2	A	A	Q3	A	A	A	Q1
US Open	Q3	Q1	A	A	A	A	A	A	A	A

=== Doubles ===
Tournament	2004	2005	2006	2007	2008	2009	2010	2011	2012	2013	W–L
Australian Open	1R	A	1R	A	A	2R	A	A	A	1R	1–4
French Open	1R	A	2R	A	1R	1R	A	A	A	1R	1–5
Wimbledon	1R	A	3R	A	1R	1R	A	A	A	1R	2–5
US Open	2R	2R	A	A	A	A	A	A	2R	A	3–3
Win–loss	1–4	1–1	3–3	0–0	0–2	1–3	0–0	0–0	1–1	0–3	7–17

== Top 10 wins ==
She has a 1–2 (33%) record against players who were, at the time the match was played, ranked in the top 10.

#	Opponent	Rank	Event	Surface	Round	Score	MJR
2009
1.	(Poland) Agnieszka Radwańska	9	2009 Fed Cup, Estonia	Hard (i)	G1 RR	1–6, 6–4, 7–6^{(7–5)}	170
