= Jaslyn Hewitt =

Australian tennis player

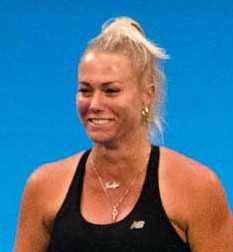
- Full name: Jaslyn Hewitt-Shehadie
- Country (sports): Australia
- Born: 23 February 1983 (age 43) Adelaide, Australia
- Plays: Right-handed
- Prize money: $60,889

Singles
- Career record: 73–87
- Career titles: 1 ITF
- Highest ranking: No. 304 (2 May 2005)

Doubles
- Career record: 43–48
- Career titles: 3 ITF
- Highest ranking: No. 322 (31 January 2005)

Grand Slam doubles results
- Australian Open: 1R (2002, 2003, 2004, 2005)

Jaslyn Hewitt-Shehadie (née Hewitt; born 23 February 1983) is a tennis executive and former professional tennis player from Australia. She is the younger sister of Lleyton Hewitt, and the daughter of Glynn Hewitt.

== Biography ==
=== Tennis career ===
A right-handed player from Adelaide, Hewitt was highly ranked in junior tennis and represented Australia at the 2000 Commonwealth Youth Games in Edinburgh.

She had a best singles ranking of 304 in the world on the professional circuit. In 2001 she featured in the main draws of two WTA Tour tournaments, the Croatian Bol Ladies Open and Belgium's Sanex Trophy, which was followed by home appearances at the 2002 Sydney International and 2005 Gold Coast Hardcourt. Her biggest title win came at Canberra in 2004, where she beat top seed Evie Dominikovic in the final of the $25k tournament. As a doubles player, she competed as a wildcard in the main draw of the Australian Open every year from 2002 to 2005.

=== Personal life ===
During her career, she was in a relationship with Swedish tennis player Joachim Johansson, which lasted for five years.

In 2010, she married actor Rob Shehadie at a ceremony in Port Douglas (with her parents declining to attend).

== ITF Circuit finals ==
$25,000 tournaments
$10,000 tournaments

=== Singles (1–2) ===
| Outcome | No. | Date | Tournament | Surface | Opponent | Score |
|---|---|---|---|---|---|---|
| Runner-up | 1. | 7 April 2003 | Bendigo, Australia | Hard | (Australia) Rachel McQuillan | 5–7, 6–4, 5–7 |
| Runner-up | 2. | 15 August 2004 | Hampstead, United Kingdom | Hard | (India) Sania Mirza | 6–4, 1–6, 0–6 |
| Winner | 3. | 27 September 2004 | Canberra, Australia | Clay | (Australia) Evie Dominikovic | 1–6, 6–3, 7–5 |

=== Doubles (3–2) ===
| Outcome | No. | Date | Tournament | Surface | Partner | Opponents | Score |
|---|---|---|---|---|---|---|---|
| Winner | 1. | 3 September 2001 | Petange, Luxembourg | Clay | (Belgium) Elke Clijsters | (Belarus) Natallia Dziamidzenka (Netherlands) Kika Hogendoorn | 6–1, 6–3 |
| Winner | 2. | 5 August 2002 | Rebecq, Belgium | Clay | (Belgium) Elke Clijsters | (Belgium) Leslie Butkiewicz (Netherlands) Tessy van de Ven | 3–6, 6–3, 6–4 |
| Runner-up | 3. | 6 March 2004 | Warrnambool, Australia | Grass | (Australia) Casey Dellacqua | (New Zealand) Eden Marama (New Zealand) Paula Marama | 3–6, 6–4, 2–6 |
| Winner | 4. | 27 April 2004 | Bournemouth, United Kingdom | Clay | (South Africa) Nicole Rencken | (Russia) Raissa Gourevitch (Russia) Ekaterina Kozhokina | 6–1, 7–6^{(7–3)} |
| Runner-up | 5. | 31 May 2004 | Hilton Head Island, United States | Hard | Tanner Cochran | Cory Ann Avants (Uzbekistan) Varvara Lepchenko | 2–6, 6–3, 3–6 |
