= Yana Levchenko =

Ukrainian tennis player

- Country (sports): Ukraine
- Born: 23 November 1987 (age 37)
- Turned pro: 2004
- Retired: 2008
- Plays: Right (two-handed backhand)
- Prize money: $12,149

Singles
- Highest ranking: No. 596 (19 February 2007)

Doubles
- Career record: 26–39
- Career titles: 2 ITF
- Highest ranking: No. 302 (5 March 2007)

Yana Levchenko (Ukrainian: Яна Левченко; born 23 November 1987) is a Ukrainian former tennis player.

Levchenko has a career-high singles ranking of world No. 596, attained on 19 February 2007, and a career-high doubles ranking by the WTA of 302, achieved on 5 March 2007. She won two doubles titles on the ITF Women's Circuit.

== Career ==
In July 2006, she won the $25k tournament in Valladolid, Spain, partnering with Veronika Chvojková.

== ITF Circuit finals ==
=== Doubles: 5 (2 titles, 3 runner-ups) ===
Legend $25,000 tournaments $10,000 tournaments	Finals by surface Hard (1–3) Clay (1–0)

Result	W-L	Date	Tournament	Tier	Surface	Partner	Opponents	Score
Loss	0–1	Feb 2006	ITF Ramat HaSharon, Israel	10,000	Hard	(Belarus) Iryna Kuryanovich	(Russia) Aleksandra Kulikova (Spain) Gabriela Velasco Andreu	5–7, 6–7^{(3)}
Loss	0–2	Mar 2006	ITF Haifa, Israel	10,000	Hard	(Belarus) Iryna Kuryanovich	(Turkey) İpek Şenoğlu (Spain) Gabriela Velasco Andreu	0–6, 0–6
Loss	0–3	Apr 2006	ITF Patras, Greece	25,000	Hard	(Bosnia and Herzegovina) Mervana Jugić-Salkić	(Australia) Christina Horiatopoulos (Slovakia) Jarmila Gajdošová	1–6, 4–6
Win	1–3	May 2006	ITF Kiev, Ukraine	10,000	Clay	(Ukraine) Veronika Kapshay	(Ukraine) Valeria Bondarenko (Ukraine) Oksana Uzhylovska	6–3, 7–5
Win	2–3	Jul 2006	ITF Valladolid, Spain	25,000	Hard	(Czech Republic) Veronika Chvojková	(Australia) Monique Adamczak (Argentina) Soledad Esperón	6–1, 7–6^{(9)}
