= Julia Efremova =

Russian tennis player

- Country (sports): Russia
- Residence: Moscow
- Born: 14 February 1985 (age 40); Kursk, Soviet Union
- Height: 1.83 m (6 ft 0 in)
- Turned pro: 2001
- Plays: Right (two-handed backhand)
- Prize money: $45,025

Singles
- Career record: 88–90
- Career titles: 1 ITF
- Highest ranking: No. 285 (14 November 2005)

Doubles
- Career record: 78–59
- Career titles: 10 ITF
- Highest ranking: No. 193 (20 February 2006)

Julia Efremova née Vorobieva (born 14 February 1985) is a former Russian tennis player. She played under her maiden name of Vorobieva (aka Vorobeva) until February 2006. She married her coach Alexey Efremov and returned to the circuit in March 2007.

In her career, Efremova won eleven titles on the ITF Women's Circuit, one in singles and ten in doubles.

== Career ==
She has played on the qualifying draws of WTA Tour tournaments on many occasions. Her career-high singles ranking was world No. 285, which she achieved on 14 November 2005, and her highest doubles ranking No. 193, achieved on 20 February 2006.

In 2003, Julia tried to qualify for her first WTA Tour event in Moscow but fell to Anastasia Rodionova in the first round. In 2005, she played the qualifying draws of five tournaments (Pattaya, Hyderabad, Beijing, Guangzhou and Tashkent) but was unsuccessful in each.

In 2006, she tried to qualify into the Bangalore Open but was overpowered in round one by Daniela Kix. In 2007, she fell in the qualifying draws of Kolkata and Moscow, losing to Sandy Gumulya and Oxana Lyubtsova, respectively.

Julia's biggest title of her career was winning the Busan Challenger doubles event in 2005, partnering with Wynne Prakusya and defeating Seiko Okamoto and Ayami Takase in the final. Her only singles title came in 2004 at Jakarta where she won a $10k event.

== ITF Circuit finals ==
$50,000 tournaments
$25,000 tournaments
$10,000 tournaments

=== Singles: 1 (title) ===
Result	No.	Date	Tournament	Surface	Opponent	Score
Win	1.	19 December 2004	ITF Jakarta, Indonesia	Hard	(South Korea) Jung Yoo-mi	3–6, 6–1, 6–3

=== Doubles: 15 (10 titles, 5 runner-ups) ===
Result	No.	Date	Tournament	Surface	Partner	Opponents	Score
Win	1.	21 July 2002	ITF Algiers, Algeria	Clay	(Russia) Aleksandra Kostikova	(Austria) Susanne Filipp (Slovakia) Andrea Masaryková	6–2, 6–4
Win	2.	13 April 2003	ITF Mumbai, India	Hard	(Czech Republic) Ludmila Richterová	(Uzbekistan) Akgul Amanmuradova (Malaysia) Khoo Chin-bee	7–5, 7–5
Loss	1.	8 June 2003	ITF Ankara, Turkey	Clay	(Spain) Gabriela Velasco Andreu	(Russia) Svetlana Mossiakova (Ukraine) Olga Lazarchuk	4–6, 1–6
Win	3.	27 June 2004	ITF Protvino, Russia	Hard	(Russia) Vasilisa Bardina	(Israel) Maria Gugel (Russia) Elena Chalova	6–3, 6–2
Loss	2.	4 July 2004	ITF Krasnoarmeysk, Russia	Hard	(Russia) Vasilisa Bardina	(Russia) Ekaterina Bychkova (Russia) Vasilisa Davydova	6–7^{(4)}, 0–6
Loss	3.	2 August 2004	ITF Vigo, Spain	Hard	(Slovenia) Sandra Volk	(Argentina) Andrea Benítez (Uruguay) Estefanía Craciún	5–7, 4–6
Loss	4.	13 December 2004	ITF Jakarta, Indonesia	Hard	(South Korea) Yoo Mi	(Indonesia) Ayu Fani Damayanti (Indonesia) Septi Mende	6–4, 0–6, 5–7
Win	4.	19 December 2004	ITF Jakarta, Indonesia	Hard	(South Korea) Yoo Mi	(South Korea) Chang Kyung-mi (South Korea) Lee Ye-ra	6–3, 6–3
Win	5.	7 March 2005	ITF Benalla, Australia	Grass	(China) Yuan Meng	(Australia) Lauren Cheung (Australia) Lisa D'Amelio	6–4, 6–3
Win	6.	20 March 2005	ITF Yarrawonga, Australia	Grass	(Australia) Lara Picone	(Australia) Emily Hewson (Australia) Nicole Kriz	6–4, 6–3
Win	7.	9 April 2005	ITF Mumbai, India	Hard	(Chinese Taipei) Chan Chin-wei	(India) Sanaa Bhambri (Romania) Mihaela Buzărnescu	6–2, 6–1
Win	8.	4 July 2005	ITF Krasnoarmeysk, Russia	Hard	(Russia) Anna Bastrikova	(Russia) Ekaterina Lopes (Russia) Elena Chalova	6–2, 7–6^{(3)}
Win	9.	21 August 2005	ITF Nanjing, China	Hard	(China) Xie Yanze	(Japan) Tomoko Sugano (Japan) Akiko Yonemura	6–4, 6–3
Win	10.	6 November 2005	Busan Challenger, Korea	Hard	(Indonesia) Wynne Prakusya	(Japan) Seiko Okamoto (Japan) Ayami Takase	6–4, 6–7^{(6)}, 6–1
Loss	5.	4 May 2008	ITF Adana, Turkey	Clay	(Russia) Diana Isaeva	(Bulgaria) Hülya Esen (Bulgaria) Lütfiye Esen	7–5, 1–6, [4–10]
