= Danielle Steinberg =

Israeli tennis player

- Native name: דניאל שטיינברג
- Country (sports): Israel
- Born: 5 August 1984 (age 40); Tel Aviv, Israel
- Turned pro: 1999
- Retired: 2004
- Plays: Right-handed
- College: Arizona Wildcats

Danielle Steinberg (Hebrew: דניאל שטיינברג; born 5 August 1984) is a former professional tennis player and tennis coach from Israel.

== Tennis career ==
She has won 3 doubles titles on the ITF Women's Circuit. On April 19, 2004, she reached her highest WTA doubles ranking of 458. In 2004 retirement from professional tennis. Steinberg attended University of Arizona. She decided to follow the college route and was part of the Arizona Wildcats tennis team from 2005 to 2009.

== Coaching ==
After her playing career, Steinberg began coaching at Wichita State University, where she served as an assistant coach for two years before taking over as head coach at McNeese University in Louisiana. After two years at McNeese, Steinberg took a coaching position at Kansas State University in 2014. She coached there for four years before coming to CU.

Steinberg was named the seventh head women's tennis coach at Kansas State Wildcats in July 2014. In 2018 Steinberg head women's tennis team coach at Colorado Buffaloes
