= 2003 Wimbledon Championships – Girls' singles =

Girls' singles
- 2003 Wimbledon Championships

Final
- Champion: (Belgium) Kirsten Flipkens
- Runner-up: (Russia) Anna Chakvetadze
- Score: 6–4, 3–6, 6–3

Details
- Draw: 64 (8 Q / 8 WC )
- Seeds: 16

Events
Singles	men	women		boys	girls
Doubles	men	women	mixed	boys	girls
WC Singles	men	women	quad
WC Doubles	men	women	quad
Legends	men	women	seniors
← 2002 ·	Wimbledon Championships	· 2004 →

Vera Dushevina was the defending champion but did not complete in the Juniors this year.

Kirsten Flipkens defeated Anna Chakvetadze in the final, 6–4, 3–6, 6–3 to win the girls' singles tennis title at the 2003 Wimbledon Championships.

== Seeds ==
1. (United States) Sunitha Rao (quarterfinals)
2. (United States) Carly Gullickson (quarterfinals)
3. (Netherlands) Michaëlla Krajicek (third round)
4. (Slovakia) Jarmila Gajdošová (semifinals)
5. (Russia) Alisa Kleybanova (second round)
6. (Czech Republic) Kateřina Böhmová (first round)
7. (United States) Ally Baker (quarterfinals)
8. (Japan) Ryōko Fuda (first round)
9. (Serbia and Montenegro) Vojislava Lukić (second round)
10. (Czech Republic) Andrea Hlaváčková (second round)
11. (Finland) Emma Laine (semifinals)
12. (France) Tatiana Golovin (quarterfinals)
13. (Ukraine) Viktoriya Kutuzova (second round)
14. (Australia) Casey Dellacqua (second round)
15. (Poland) Marta Domachowska (first round)
16. (India) Sania Mirza (second round)

Click on the seed number of a player to go to their draw section.

== Draw ==
=== Key ===
- Q = Qualifier
- WC = Wild card
- LL = Lucky loser
- Alt = Alternate
- SE = Special exempt
- PR = Protected ranking
- ITF = ITF entry
- JE = Junior exempt
- w/o = Walkover
- r = Retired
- d = Defaulted
- SR = Special ranking

=== Finals ===
Quarterfinals
1	(United States) Sunitha Rao	3	2
(Belgium) Kirsten Flipkens	6	6
4	(Slovakia) Jarmila Gajdošová	5	6	6
12	(France) Tatiana Golovin	7	1	3
7	(United States) Ally Baker	6	5	3
Q	(Russia) Anna Chakvetadze	1	7	6
11	(Finland) Emma Laine	6	6
2	(United States) Carly Gullickson	4	0

Semifinals
(Belgium) Kirsten Flipkens	2	6	10
4	(Slovakia) Jarmila Gajdošová	6	4	8
Q	(Russia) Anna Chakvetadze	6	6
11	(Finland) Emma Laine	4	2

Final
(Belgium) Kirsten Flipkens	6	3	6
Q	(Russia) Anna Chakvetadze	4	6	3

=== Top half ===
==== Section 1 ====
First round
1	(United States) Sunitha Rao	6	6
(Hungary) Ágnes Szávay	1	1
Q	(Sweden) Mari Andersson	7^{7}	1	3
(Switzerland) Timea Bacsinszky	6^{3}	6	6
(New Zealand) Eden Marama	6	6
(Thailand) Montinee Tangphong	2	4
(Ukraine) Olena Tsutskova	1	1
16	(India) Sania Mirza	6	6
10	(Czech Republic) Andrea Hlaváčková	6	6
WC	(United Kingdom) Claire Peterzan	1	3
(Jamaica) Megan Moulton-Levy	5	5
(Serbia and Montenegro) Ana Ivanovic	7	7
LL	(Croatia) Tamara Bunić	3	3
(Belgium) Kirsten Flipkens	6	6
Q	(Canada) Stéphanie Dubois	2	6	2
5	(Russia) Alisa Kleybanova	6	4	6

Second round
1	(United States) S Rao	6	6
(Switzerland) T Bacsinszky	3	0
(New Zealand) E Marama	6	3	6
16	(India) S Mirza	2	6	1
10	(Czech Republic) A Hlaváčková	6^{1}	6	8
(Serbia and Montenegro) A Ivanovic	7^{7}	3	6
(Belgium) K Flipkens	6	6^{4}	7
5	(Russia) A Kleybanova	3	7^{7}	5

Third round
1	(United States) S Rao	6	7^{7}
(New Zealand) E Marama	4	6^{2}
(Serbia and Montenegro) A Ivanovic	6	3	2
(Belgium) K Flipkens	2	6	6

Quarterfinals
1	(United States) S Rao	3	2
(Belgium) K Flipkens	6	6

==== Section 2 ====
First round
4	(Slovakia) Jarmila Gajdošová	6	6
Q	(Spain) Adriana González-Peñas	2	1
(South Africa) Tarryn Rudman	0	0
(Canada) Katarina Zoricic	6	6
(Ukraine) Kateryna Bondarenko	6	6
(United States) Krystina Marcio	2	1
Q	(United States) Megan Falcon	3	2
14	(Australia) Casey Dellacqua	6	6
12	(France) Tatiana Golovin	6	6
(United States) Julia Cohen	1	2
WC	(United Kingdom) Katharine Baker	6	3	1
LL	(Australia) Lara Giltinan	3	6	6
(China) Du Rui	6	6
(Serbia and Montenegro) Vanja Ćorović	3	4
(Czech Republic) Nicole Vaidišová	5	6	6
8	(Japan) Ryōko Fuda	7	4	3

Second round
4	(Slovakia) J Gajdošová	6	6
(Canada) K Zoricic	2	1
(Ukraine) K Bondarenko	6	6
14	(Australia) C Dellacqua	4	3
12	(France) T Golovin	6	6
(Australia) L Giltinan	0	2
(China) R Du	1	0
(Czech Republic) N Vaidišová	6	6

Third round
4	(Slovakia) J Gajdošová	6	6
(Ukraine) K Bondarenko	1	4
12	(France) T Golovin	6	6
(Czech Republic) N Vaidišová	3	4

Quarterfinals
4	(Slovakia) J Gajdošová	5	6	6
12	(France) T Golovin	7	1	3

=== Bottom half ===
==== Section 3 ====
First round
7	(United States) Ally Baker	7	6
WC	(United Kingdom) Hannah Grady	5	3
(Hungary) Zsuzsanna Babos	6	6
(India) Sanaa Bhambri	3	3
(Israel) Shahar Pe'er	4	6	6
(Croatia) Nadja Pavić	6	4	1
Q	(Belarus) Olga Govortsova	1	5
9	(Serbia and Montenegro) Vojislava Lukić	6	7
15	(Poland) Marta Domachowska	6	2	3
Q	(Russia) Anna Chakvetadze	3	6	6
WC	(United Kingdom) Holly Bagshaw	4	6	2
(Canada) Beier Ko	6	3	6
(Czech Republic) Lucie Šafářová	7^{7}	7^{7}
(United States) Michelle Mitchell	6^{5}	6^{2}
(Slovakia) Kristína Czafiková	4	6	1
3	(Netherlands) Michaëlla Krajicek	6	3	6

Second round
7	(United States) A Baker	6	6
(Hungary) Z Babos	1	1
(Israel) S Pe'er	5	6	6
9	(Serbia and Montenegro) V Lukić	7	1	3
Q	(Russia) A Chakvetadze	6	6
(Canada) B Ko	4	2
(Czech Republic) L Šafářová	6	3	4
3	(Netherlands) M Krajicek	4	6	6

Third round
7	(United States) A Baker	6	6
(Israel) S Pe'er	2	3
Q	(Russia) A Chakvetadze	1	6	8
3	(Netherlands) M Krajicek	6	4	6

Quarterfinals
7	(United States) A Baker	6	5	3
Q	(Russia) A Chakvetadze	1	7	6

==== Section 4 ====
First round
6	(Czech Republic) Kateřina Böhmová	6	0	5
WC	(United Kingdom) Katie O'Brien	2	6	7
(Romania) Mădălina Gojnea	7^{7}	1	6
(Slovakia) Linda Smoleňáková	6^{5}	6	0
(United States) Iris Ichim	7	6
WC	(Egypt) Heidi El Tabakh	5	1
Q	(Australia) Sophie Ferguson	1	4
11	(Finland) Emma Laine	6	6
13	(Ukraine) Viktoriya Kutuzova	7	6^{6}	6
(Germany) Angelique Kerber	5	7^{8}	2
(Russia) Alla Kudryavtseva	7^{8}	6
(China) Sun Shengnan	6^{6}	2
(Thailand) Thassha Vitayaviroj	4	3
Q	(Japan) Moe Kawatoko	6	6
WC	(United Kingdom) Georgie Stoop	2	3
2	(United States) Carly Gullickson	6	6

Second round
WC	(United Kingdom) K O'Brien	6	6
(Romania) M Gojnea	4	2
(United States) I Ichim	1	3
11	(Finland) E Laine	6	6
13	(Ukraine) V Kutuzova	7^{9}	6^{5}	3
(Russia) A Kudryavtseva	6^{7}	7^{7}	6
(Japan) M Kawatoko	1	2
2	(United States) C Gullickson	6	6

Third round
WC	(United Kingdom) K O'Brien	1	5
11	(Finland) E Laine	6	7
(Russia) A Kudryavtseva	6	3	4
2	(United States) C Gullickson	2	6	6

Quarterfinals
11	(Finland) E Laine	6	6
2	(United States) C Gullickson	4	0
