= 2003 French Open – Girls' singles =

Girls' singles
- 2003 French Open

Final
- Champion: (Germany) Anna-Lena Grönefeld
- Runner-up: (Russia) Vera Dushevina
- Score: 6–4, 6–4

Events
| Singles | men | women | | boys | girls |
| Doubles | men | women | mixed | boys | girls |
| WC Singles | men | women | quad |
| WC Doubles | men | women | quad |
| Legends | −45 | 45+ | women |
| ← 2002 · | French Open | · 2004 → |

Angelique Widjaja was the defending champion, but she did not compete in the juniors this year.

Anna-Lena Grönefeld won the tournament, defeating Vera Dushevina in the final, 6–4, 6–4.

== Seeds ==
1. (Russia) Vera Douchevina (final)
2. (Germany) Anna-Lena Grönefeld (champion)
3. (Netherlands) Michaëlla Krajicek (semifinals)
4. (France) Tatiana Golovin (second round)
5. (France) Anaïs Laurendon (first round)
6. (Russia) Alisa Kleybanova (third round)
7. (Czech Republic) Kateřina Böhmová (quarterfinals)
8. (Hungary) Virág Németh (first round)
9. (Lithuania) Aurelija Misevičiūtė (first round)
10. (Ukraine) Viktoria Kutuzova (first round)
11. (Poland) Marta Domachowska (first round)
12. (Serbia and Montenegro) Vojislava Lukić (third round)
13. (Japan) Ryōko Fuda (first round)
14. (India) Sania Mirza (first round)
15. (Croatia) Nadja Pavic (first round)
16. (United States) Julia Cohen (first round)

== Draw ==
=== Key ===
- Q = Qualifier
- WC = Wild card
- LL = Lucky loser
- Alt = Alternate
- SE = Special exempt
- PR = Protected ranking
- ITF = ITF entry
- JE = Junior exempt
- w/o = Walkover
- r = Retired
- d = Defaulted
- SR = Special ranking

=== Finals ===
Quarterfinals
1 | (Russia) Vera Douchevina | 7^{12} | 6
(Israel) Shahar Pe'er | 6^{10} | 2
3 | (Netherlands) Michaëlla Krajicek | 6 | 1 | 6
Q | (Romania) Delia Sescioreanu | 4 | 6 | 4
(Romania) Mădălina Gojnea | 6 | 7^{7}
(Ukraine) Kateryna Bondarenko | 2 | 6^{2}
7 | (Czech Republic) Kateřina Böhmová | 1 | 2
2 | (Germany) Anna-Lena Grönefeld | 6 | 6

Semifinals
1 | (Russia) Vera Douchevina | 6 | 6
3 | (Netherlands) Michaëlla Krajicek | 4 | 3
(Romania) Mădălina Gojnea | 7^{7} | 4 | 0
2 | (Germany) Anna-Lena Grönefeld | 6^{4} | 6 | 6

Final
1 | (Russia) Vera Douchevina | 4 | 4
2 | (Germany) Anna-Lena Grönefeld | 6 | 6

=== Top half ===
==== Section 1 ====
First round
1 | (Russia) Vera Douchevina | 6^{6} | 6 | 6
Q | (Belgium) Kirsten Flipkens | 7^{8} | 1 | 3
(Croatia) Sanja Ančić | 0 | 1
Q | (Spain) Marta Fraga Pérez | 6 | 6
(Chinese Taipei) Yung-Jan Chan | 4 | 4
(France) Sylvia Montero | 6 | 6
(Serbia and Montenegro) Ana Ivanovic | 6 | 6
16 | (United States) Julia Cohen | 2 | 0
11 | (Poland) Marta Domachowska | 6^{4} | 6 | 6
WC | (France) Pauline Parmentier | 7^{7} | 4 | 8
(Thailand) Montinee Tangphong | 3 | 1
(Czech Republic) Andrea Hlaváčková | 6 | 6
(Germany) Angelique Kerber | 2 | 7 | 1
(United States) Jamea Jackson | 6 | 5 | 6
(Israel) Shahar Pe'er | 4 | 6 | 6
5 | (France) Anaïs Laurendon | 6 | 1 | 1

Second round
1 | (Russia) V Douchevina | 6 | 6
Q | (Spain) M Fraga Pérez | 3 | 4
(France) S Montero | 6 | 1 | 5
(Serbia and Montenegro) A Ivanovic | 2 | 6 | 7
WC | (France) P Parmentier | 4 | 4
(Czech Republic) A Hlaváčková | 6 | 6
(United States) J Jackson | 6 | 3 | 2
(Israel) S Pe'er | 4 | 6 | 6

Third round
1 | (Russia) V Douchevina | 6 | 6
(Serbia and Montenegro) A Ivanovic | 3 | 4
(Czech Republic) A Hlaváčková | 4 | 4
(Israel) S Pe'er | 6 | 6

Quarterfinals
1 | (Russia) V Douchevina | 7^{12} | 6
(Israel) S Pe'er | 6^{10} | 2

==== Section 2 ====
First round
3 | (Netherlands) Michaëlla Krajicek | 6 | 6
(Belarus) Anastasia Yakimova | 1 | 4
WC | (France) Julia Wieckowski | 2 | 2
LL | (United States) Iris Ichim | 6 | 6
WC | (France) Virginie Ayassamy | 0 | 1
(Slovakia) Kristína Czafiková | 6 | 6
(Egypt) Heidi El Tabakh | 6 | 6
14 | (India) Sania Mirza | 1 | 4
10 | (Ukraine) Viktoria Kutuzova | 3 | 7^{7} | 4
Q | (Romania) Delia Sescioreanu | 6 | 6^{5} | 6
Q | (Australia) Casey Dellacqua | 0 | 7^{9} | 2
(Czech Republic) Lucie Šafářová | 6 | 6^{7} | 6
Q | (Russia) Anna Chakvetadze | 6 | 6
(Canada) Beier Ko | 3 | 2
WC | (France) Laura Rocchi | 1 | 6 | 8
8 | (Hungary) Virág Németh | 6 | 1 | 6

Second round
3 | (Netherlands) M Krajicek | 7^{7} | 6
LL | (United States) I Ichim | 6^{5} | 2
(Slovakia) K Czafiková | 6 | 3 | 3
(Egypt) H El Tabakh | 2 | 6 | 6
Q | (Romania) D Sescioreanu | 6 | 6
(Czech Republic) L Šafářová | 3 | 1
Q | (Russia) A Chakvetadze | 6 | 4 | 5
WC | (France) L Rocchi | 3 | 6 | 7

Third round
3 | (Netherlands) M Krajicek | 6 | 6
(Egypt) H El Tabakh | 4 | 2
Q | (Romania) D Sescioreanu | 6 | 6
WC | (France) L Rocchi | 4 | 2

Quarterfinals
3 | (Netherlands) M Krajicek | 6 | 1 | 6
Q | (Romania) D Sescioreanu | 4 | 6 | 4

=== Bottom half ===
==== Section 3 ====
First round
6 | (Russia) Alisa Kleybanova | 6 | 6
WC | (France) Mathilde Johansson | 2 | 4
LL | (Canada) Stéphanie Dubois | 6 | 6
(Thailand) Thassha Vitayaviroj | 4 | 4
(Romania) Mădălina Gojnea | 6 | 6^{5} | 6
(New Zealand) Eden Marama | 2 | 7^{7} | 0
(Czech Republic) Nicole Vaidišová | 6 | 6
9 | (Lithuania) Aurelija Misevičiūtė | 2 | 3
13 | (Japan) Ryōko Fuda | 1 | 1
(Ukraine) Kateryna Bondarenko | 6 | 6
Q | (United States) Megan Falcon | 6 | 4
WC | (France) Charlene Vanneste | 3 | 0^{r}
(Finland) Emma Laine | 6 | 6
(Serbia and Montenegro) Vanja Corovic | 2 | 1
(Brazil) Larissa Carvalho | 1 | 4
4 | (France) Tatiana Golovin | 6 | 6

Second round
6 | (Russia) A Kleybanova | 6 | 6
LL | (Canada) S Dubois | 3 | 4
(Romania) M Gojnea | 6 | 6^{4} | 6
(Czech Republic) N Vaidišová | 4 | 7^{7} | 3
(Ukraine) K Bondarenko | 6 | 6
Q | (United States) M Falcon | 2 | 0
(Finland) E Laine | 6 | 6
4 | (France) T Golovin | 2 | 3

Third round
6 | (Russia) A Kleybanova | 2 | 6 | 1
(Romania) M Gojnea | 6 | 2 | 6
(Ukraine) K Bondarenko | 7 | 2 | 7
(Finland) E Laine | 5 | 6 | 5

Quarterfinals
(Romania) M Gojnea | 6 | 7^{7}
(Ukraine) K Bondarenko | 2 | 6^{2}

==== Section 4 ====
First round
7 | (Czech Republic) Kateřina Böhmová | 4 | 6 | 6
(Hungary) Ágnes Szávay | 6 | 0 | 3
(United States) Krystina Marcio | 7 | 6
WC | (France) Aravane Rezaï | 5 | 2
(Slovakia) Linda Smolenakova | 7 | 6
WC | (France) Laura Thorpe | 5 | 3
LL | (Australia) Lara Giltinan | 4 | 7^{7} | 2
12 | (Serbia and Montenegro) Vojislava Lukić | 6 | 6^{5} | 6
15 | (Croatia) Nadja Pavic | 3 | 6 | 0
(Switzerland) Timea Bacsinszky | 6 | 3 | 6
(Mauritius) Marinne Giraud | 7 | 6
(India) Sanaa Bhambri | 5 | 2
LL | (Russia) Ekaterina Bychkova | 2 | 2
Q | (Spain) Adriana González-Peñas | 6 | 6
Q | (Canada) Katarina Zoricic | 3 | 2
2 | (Germany) Anna-Lena Grönefeld | 6 | 6

Second round
7 | (Czech Republic) K Böhmová | 6 | 6
(United States) K Marcio | 1 | 3
(Slovakia) L Smolenakova | 2 | 6 | 3
12 | (Serbia and Montenegro) V Lukić | 6 | 2 | 6
(Switzerland) T Bacsinszky | 6 | 6
(Mauritius) M Giraud | 3 | 1
Q | (Spain) A González-Peñas | 1 | 2
2 | (Germany) A-L Grönefeld | 6 | 6

Third round
7 | (Czech Republic) K Böhmová | 6 | 4 | 6
12 | (Serbia and Montenegro) V Lukić | 0 | 6 | 4
(Switzerland) T Bacsinszky | 1 | 3
2 | (Germany) A-L Grönefeld | 6 | 6

Quarterfinals
7 | (Czech Republic) K Böhmová | 1 | 2
2 | (Germany) A-L Grönefeld | 6 | 6

== Sources ==
- Draw
