= 2003 Wimbledon Championships – Girls' doubles =

Girls' doubles
- 2003 Wimbledon Championships

Final
- Champions: (Russia) Alisa Kleybanova (India) Sania Mirza
- Runners-up: (Czech Republic) Kateřina Böhmová (Netherlands) Michaëlla Krajicek
- Score: 2–6, 6–3, 6–2

Events
Singles	men	women		boys	girls
Doubles	men	women	mixed	boys	girls
WC Singles	men	women	quad
WC Doubles	men	women	quad
Legends	men	women	seniors
← 2002 ·	Wimbledon Championships	· 2004 →

Elke Clijsters and Barbora Strýcová were the defending champions, but they did not compete in the Juniors this year.

Alisa Kleybanova and Sania Mirza defeated Kateřina Böhmová and Michaëlla Krajicek in the final, 2–6, 6–3, 6–2 to win the girls' doubles tennis title at the 2003 Wimbledon Championships.

== Seeds ==
1. (Slovakia) Jarmila Gajdošová / (Czech Republic) Andrea Hlaváčková (first round)
2. (Slovakia) Kristína Czafiková / (Belgium) Kirsten Flipkens (first round)
3. (Ukraine) Kateryna Bondarenko / (Ukraine) Olena Tsutskova (quarterfinals)
4. (Australia) Casey Dellacqua / (Australia) Adriana Szili (quarterfinals)

== Draw ==
=== Key ===
- Q = Qualifier
- WC = Wild card
- LL = Lucky loser
- Alt = Alternate
- SE = Special exempt
- PR = Protected ranking
- ITF = ITF entry
- JE = Junior exempt
- w/o = Walkover
- r = Retired
- d = Defaulted
- SR = Special ranking

=== Draw ===
First round
1	(Slovakia) Jarmila Gajdošová (Czech Republic) Andrea Hlaváčková	6^{7}	4
(Russia) Alisa Kleybanova (India) Sania Mirza	7^{9}	6
WC	(United Kingdom) Katie O'Brien (United Kingdom) Georgie Stoop	1	2
(Finland) Emma Laine (Croatia) Nadja Pavić	6	6
3	(Ukraine) Kateryna Bondarenko (Ukraine) Olena Tsutskova	6	6
(Sweden) Mari Andersson (Australia) Sophie Ferguson	0	4
(United States) Ally Baker (United States) Iris Ichim	6	6
(United States) Julia Cohen (United States) Michelle Mitchell	0	2
(Switzerland) Timea Bacsinszky (Romania) Mădălina Gojnea	5	3
(Czech Republic) Kateřina Böhmová (Netherlands) Michaëlla Krajicek	7	6
(India) Sanaa Bhambri (Australia) Lara Giltinan	1	4
4	(Australia) Casey Dellacqua (Australia) Adriana Szili	6	6
(Jamaica) Megan Moulton-Levy (Canada) Katarina Zoricic	2	2
(United States) Megan Falcon (Spain) Adriana González-Peñas	6	6
(Belarus) Olga Govortsova (Russia) Alla Kudryavtseva	7	6^{4}	11
2	(Slovakia) Kristína Czafiková (Belgium) Kirsten Flipkens	5	7^{7}	9

Quarterfinals
(Russia) Alisa Kleybanova (India) Sania Mirza	6	6
(Finland) Emma Laine (Croatia) Nadja Pavić	1	2
3	(Ukraine) Kateryna Bondarenko (Ukraine) Olena Tsutskova	3	6^{1}
(United States) Ally Baker (United States) Iris Ichim	6	7^{7}
(Czech Republic) Kateřina Böhmová (Netherlands) Michaëlla Krajicek	6	7^{7}
4	(Australia) Casey Dellacqua (Australia) Adriana Szili	3	6^{3}
(United States) Megan Falcon (Spain) Adriana González-Peñas	7	6
(Belarus) Olga Govortsova (Russia) Alla Kudryavtseva	5	3

Semifinals
(Russia) Alisa Kleybanova (India) Sania Mirza	6	5	6
(United States) Ally Baker (United States) Iris Ichim	3	7	4
(Czech Republic) Kateřina Böhmová (Netherlands) Michaëlla Krajicek	6	6
(United States) Megan Falcon (Spain) Adriana González-Peñas	2	2

Final
(Russia) Alisa Kleybanova (India) Sania Mirza	2	6	6
(Czech Republic) Kateřina Böhmová (Netherlands) Michaëlla Krajicek	6	3	2
