= Kateřina Böhmová =

Kateřina Böhmová may refer to:

- Kateřina Böhmová (1958), Czech tennis player (the mother)
- Kateřina Böhmová (1986), Czech tennis player (the daughter)
