= 2003 Wimbledon Championships – Women's doubles =

Women's doubles
- 2003 Wimbledon Championships

Final
- Champions: (Belgium) Kim Clijsters (Japan) Ai Sugiyama
- Runners-up: (Spain) Virginia Ruano Pascual (Argentina) Paola Suárez
- Score: 6–4, 6–4

Details
- Draw: 64 (4 Q / 6 WC )
- Seeds: 16

Events
Singles	men	women		boys	girls
Doubles	men	women	mixed	boys	girls
WC Singles	men	women	quad
WC Doubles	men	women	quad
Legends	men	women	seniors
← 2002 ·	Wimbledon Championships	· 2004 →

Serena and Venus Williams were the defending champions, but lost in the third round to Elena Dementieva and Lina Krasnoroutskaya.

Kim Clijsters and Ai Sugiyama defeated Virginia Ruano Pascual and Paola Suárez in the final, 6–4, 6–4 to win the ladies' doubles tennis title at the 2003 Wimbledon Championships.

== Seeds ==
1. (Spain) Virginia Ruano Pascual / (Argentina) Paola Suárez (final)
2. (Belgium) Kim Clijsters / (Japan) Ai Sugiyama (champions)
3. (United States) Serena Williams / (United States) Venus Williams (third round)
4. (United States) Lindsay Davenport / (United States) Lisa Raymond (semifinals)
5. (Zimbabwe) Cara Black / (Russia) Elena Likhovtseva (third round)
6. (Serbia and Montenegro) Jelena Dokic / (Russia) Nadia Petrova (second round)
7. (Slovakia) Janette Husárová / (Spain) Conchita Martínez (quarterfinals)
8. (Russia) Svetlana Kuznetsova / (United States) Martina Navratilova (quarterfinals)
9. (Slovakia) Daniela Hantuchová / (United States) Chanda Rubin (second round)
10. (South Africa) Liezel Huber / (Bulgaria) Magdalena Maleeva (third round)
11. (Switzerland) Emmanuelle Gagliardi / (United States) Meghann Shaughnessy (second round)
12. (Hungary) Petra Mandula / (Austria) Patricia Wartusch (quarterfinals)
13. (France) Nathalie Dechy / (France) Émilie Loit (third round)
14. (Slovenia) Tina Križan / (Slovenia) Katarina Srebotnik (second round)
15. (Russia) Elena Dementieva / (Russia) Lina Krasnoroutskaya (semifinals)
16. (Chinese Taipei) Janet Lee / (Indonesia) Wynne Prakusya (second round)

Click on the seed number of a player to go to their draw section.

== Draw ==
=== Key ===
- Q = Qualifier
- WC = Wild card
- LL = Lucky loser
- Alt = Alternate
- ITF = ITF entry
- PR = Protected ranking
- SR = Special ranking
- SE = Special exempt
- JE = Junior exempt
- JR = Junior Accelerator Programme entrant
- CO = College Accelerator Programme entrant
- NG = Next Gen Accelerator Program entrant
- w/o = Walkover
- r = Retired
- d = Defaulted

=== Finals ===
Quarterfinals
1	(Spain) Virginia Ruano Pascual (Argentina) Paola Suárez	6	7^{7}
12	(Hungary) Petra Mandula (Austria) Patricia Wartusch	2	6^{5}
15	(Russia) Elena Dementieva (Russia) Lina Krasnoroutskaya	3	6	6
(Venezuela) María Vento-Kabchi (Indonesia) Angelique Widjaja	6	2	1
7	(Slovakia) Janette Husárová (Spain) Conchita Martínez	0	2
4	(United States) Lindsay Davenport (United States) Lisa Raymond	6	6
8	(Russia) Svetlana Kuznetsova (United States) Martina Navratilova	6	2	4
2	(Belgium) Kim Clijsters (Japan) Ai Sugiyama	4	6	6

Semifinals
1	(Spain) Virginia Ruano Pascual (Argentina) Paola Suárez	3	6	6
15	(Russia) Elena Dementieva (Russia) Lina Krasnoroutskaya	6	1	2
4	(United States) Lindsay Davenport (United States) Lisa Raymond	1	6	4
2	(Belgium) Kim Clijsters (Japan) Ai Sugiyama	6	0	6

Final
1	(Spain) Virginia Ruano Pascual (Argentina) Paola Suárez	4	4
2	(Belgium) Kim Clijsters (Japan) Ai Sugiyama	6	6

=== Top half ===
==== Section 1 ====
First round
1	(Spain) V Ruano Pascual (Argentina) P Suárez	6	4	6
(Japan) R Fujiwara (Japan) S Obata	3	6	2
(Italy) S Farina Elia (Italy) T Garbin	6	6
(Germany) B Lamade (Germany) M Müller	2	1
(Japan) S Asagoe (Japan) N Miyagi	7	1
(Netherlands) K Boogert (Spain) M Serna	5	0^{r}
WC	(United Kingdom) A Janes (United Kingdom) A Keothavong	1	3
14	(Slovenia) T Križan (Slovenia) K Srebotnik	6	6
12	(Hungary) P Mandula (Austria) P Wartusch	2	6	6
(United States) N Arendt (Australia) E Dominikovic	6	3	3
(United States) T Ashley (United States) A Spears	6^{3}	6	1
(Croatia) I Majoli (Germany) B Rittner	7^{7}	2	6
(Spain) M Marrero (Paraguay) R Neffa-de los Ríos	3	4
(Russia) E Kulikovskaya (Croatia) S Talaja	6	6
Q	(Australia) B Stewart (Australia) C Wheeler	6	3	4
5	(Zimbabwe) C Black (Russia) E Likhovtseva	3	6	6

Second round
1	(Spain) V Ruano Pascual (Argentina) P Suárez	7	6
(Italy) S Farina Elia (Italy) T Garbin	5	1
(Japan) S Asagoe (Japan) N Miyagi	6	7^{7}
14	(Slovenia) T Križan (Slovenia) K Srebotnik	4	6^{4}
12	(Hungary) P Mandula (Austria) P Wartusch	2	6	6
(Croatia) I Majoli (Germany) B Rittner	6	1	3
(Russia) E Kulikovskaya (Croatia) S Talaja	2	2
5	(Zimbabwe) C Black (Russia) E Likhovtseva	6	6

Third round
1	(Spain) V Ruano Pascual (Argentina) P Suárez	6	2	6
(Japan) S Asagoe (Japan) N Miyagi	4	6	2
12	(Hungary) P Mandula (Austria) P Wartusch	3	7^{8}	6
5	(Zimbabwe) C Black (Russia) E Likhovtseva	6	6^{6}	2

Quarterfinals
1	(Spain) V Ruano Pascual (Argentina) P Suárez	6	7^{7}
12	(Hungary) P Mandula (Austria) P Wartusch	2	6^{5}

==== Section 2 ====
First round
3/ WC	(United States) S Williams (United States) V Williams	6^{7}	6	6
(United States) C Morariu (Australia) R Stubbs	7^{9}	2	3
(Italy) F Pennetta (Italy) R Vinci	6	3	4
(Australia) A Molik (Australia) S Stosur	4	6	6
(Belgium) E Callens (United States) M Tu	6	6
(United States) A Augustus (United States) J Embry	0	0
(Croatia) J Kostanić (Russia) A Myskina	5	5
15	(Russia) E Dementieva (Russia) L Krasnoroutskaya	7	7
11	(Switzerland) E Gagliardi (United States) M Shaughnessy	6	6
(Argentina) P Tarabini (Netherlands) C Vis	3	0
(Ukraine) Y Beygelzimer (Belarus) T Poutchek	7	3	3
(Venezuela) M Sequera (United States) M Washington	5	6	6
(Venezuela) M Vento-Kabchi (Indonesia) A Widjaja	7^{7}	2	6
(Argentina) G Dulko (Argentina) ME Salerni	6^{5}	6	2
(United States) A Harkleroad (Ukraine) T Perebiynis	2	1
6	(Serbia and Montenegro) J Dokic (Russia) N Petrova	6	6

Second round
3/ WC	(United States) S Williams (United States) V Williams	6	6
(Australia) A Molik (Australia) S Stosur	1	1
(Belgium) E Callens (United States) M Tu	5	1
15	(Russia) E Dementieva (Russia) L Krasnoroutskaya	7	6
11	(Switzerland) E Gagliardi (United States) M Shaughnessy	6^{12}	7^{7}	2
(Venezuela) M Sequera (United States) M Washington	7^{14}	6^{0}	6
(Venezuela) M Vento-Kabchi (Indonesia) A Widjaja	6	6
6	(Serbia and Montenegro) J Dokic (Russia) N Petrova	3	0

Third round
3/ WC	(United States) S Williams (United States) V Williams	3	6	5
15	(Russia) E Dementieva (Russia) L Krasnoroutskaya	6	3	7
(Venezuela) M Sequera (United States) M Washington	7	1	3
(Venezuela) M Vento-Kabchi (Indonesia) A Widjaja	5	6	6

Quarterfinals
15	(Russia) E Dementieva (Russia) L Krasnoroutskaya	3	6	6
(Venezuela) M Vento-Kabchi (Indonesia) A Widjaja	6	2	1

=== Bottom half ===
==== Section 3 ====
First round
7	(Slovakia) J Husárová (Spain) C Martínez	7	6
WC	(United Kingdom) L Ahl (Tunisia) S Sfar	5	2
(Australia) N Pratt (Uzbekistan) I Tulyaganova	4	6	4
(France) M Bartoli (Switzerland) M Casanova	6	3	6
(Australia) T Musgrave (Ukraine) E Tatarkova	6	6
WC	(United Kingdom) E Baltacha (United Kingdom) J Pullin	1	1
(Greece) E Daniilidou (Italy) R Grande	5	1
10	(South Africa) L Huber (Bulgaria) M Maleeva	7	6
13	(France) N Dechy (France) É Loit	5	7	6
(Slovenia) M Matevžič (Slovakia) H Nagyová	7	5	2
(Germany) K Freye (Spain) C Martínez Granados	6^{6}	2
(South Africa) N de Villiers (South Africa) N Grandin	7^{8}	6
Q	(United States) J Craybas (Canada) V Webb	6^{4}	6	6
(Hungary) K Marosi (United States) S Reeves	7^{7}	4	4
(Australia) L McShea (Kazakhstan) I Selyutina	2	3
4	(United States) L Davenport (United States) L Raymond	6	6

Second round
7	(Slovakia) J Husárová (Spain) C Martínez	6	7^{7}
(France) M Bartoli (Switzerland) M Casanova	2	6^{2}
(Australia) T Musgrave (Ukraine) E Tatarkova	3	6^{7}
10	(South Africa) L Huber (Bulgaria) M Maleeva	6	7^{9}
13	(France) N Dechy (France) É Loit	6	7^{7}
4	(South Africa) N de Villiers (South Africa) N Grandin	0	6^{4}
Q	(United States) J Craybas (Canada) V Webb	3	4
4	(United States) L Davenport (United States) L Raymond	6	6

Third round
7	(Slovakia) J Husárová (Spain) C Martínez	3	6	7
10	(South Africa) L Huber (Bulgaria) M Maleeva	6	3	5
13	(France) N Dechy (France) É Loit	3	4
4	(United States) L Davenport (United States) L Raymond	6	6

Quarterfinals
7	(Slovakia) J Husárová (Spain) C Martínez	0	2
4	(United States) L Davenport (United States) L Raymond	6	6

==== Section 4 ====
First round
8	(Russia) S Kuznetsova (United States) M Navratilova	4	6	6
(Russia) A Rodionova (Germany) M Weingärtner	6	3	3
WC	(United Kingdom) H Crook (United Kingdom) A Hawkins	3	6	6
(Austria) B Schett (Switzerland) P Schnyder	6	1	2
Q	(Australia) N Sewell (Australia) S Stone	2	4
(Czech Republic) D Bedáňová (Czech Republic) R Voráčová	6	6
(Russia) A Jidkova (Japan) A Morigami	2	5
9	(Slovakia) D Hantuchová (United States) C Rubin	6	7
16	(Chinese Taipei) J Lee (Indonesia) W Prakusya	6	4	6
Q	(Italy) F Schiavone (Italy) A Serra Zanetti	1	6	4
WC	(United Kingdom) S Borwell (United Kingdom) J O'Donoghue	1	4
(United States) L Granville (United States) A Stevenson	6	6
(Romania) R Dragomir Ilie (Romania) A Vanc	4	6	8
(France) C Dhenin (Canada) S Jeyaseelan	6	2	6
(Australia) C Barclay (Australia) R McQuillan	3	1
2	(Belgium) K Clijsters (Japan) A Sugiyama	6	6

Second round
8	(Russia) S Kuznetsova (United States) M Navratilova	6	6
WC	(United Kingdom) H Crook (United Kingdom) A Hawkins	2	1
(Czech Republic) D Bedáňová (Czech Republic) R Voráčová	6^{4}	6	6
9	(Slovakia) D Hantuchová (United States) C Rubin	7^{7}	1	3
16	(Chinese Taipei) J Lee (Indonesia) W Prakusya	5	5
(United States) L Granville (United States) A Stevenson	7	7
(Romania) R Dragomir Ilie (Romania) A Vanc	2	2
2	(Belgium) K Clijsters (Japan) A Sugiyama	6	6

Third round
8	(Russia) S Kuznetsova (United States) M Navratilova	6	6
(Czech Republic) D Bedáňová (Czech Republic) R Voráčová	3	1
(United States) L Granville (United States) A Stevenson	5	2
2	(Belgium) K Clijsters (Japan) A Sugiyama	7	6

Quarterfinals
8	(Russia) S Kuznetsova (United States) M Navratilova	6	2	4
2	(Belgium) K Clijsters (Japan) A Sugiyama	4	6	6
