= Kristína Michalaková =

Slovak tennis player

- Country (sports): Slovakia
- Born: 30 May 1985 (age 40); Bratislava, Czechoslovakia
- Retired: 2008
- Plays: Right-handed
- Prize money: $28,546

Singles
- Career titles: 1 ITF
- Highest ranking: No. 243 (27 February 2006)

Grand Slam singles results
- Australian Open Junior: 3R (2002)
- French Open Junior: 2R (2003)
- Wimbledon Junior: 3R (2002)
- US Open Junior: 1R (2002)

Doubles
- Career titles: 1 ITF

Grand Slam doubles results
- Australian Open Junior: 2R (2002, 2003)
- French Open Junior: 1R (2002, 2003)
- Wimbledon Junior: 1R (2002, 2003)
- US Open Junior: 2R (2002)

Kristína Michalaková (née Czafiková born 30 May 1985) is a former professional Slovak tennis player. On 27 February 2006, she reached her highest WTA singles ranking of 243.

== Career ==
Michalaková had a successful junior career. Her career-high doubles ranking as a junior was world No. 5. In 2002, she won a prestigious tournament for juniors, the Grade A Osaka Mayor's Cup, partnering with Emma Laine.

In her senior career, she won one singles and one doubles title on the ITF Women's Circuit. She was competing on the circuit until June 2006, and had a short comeback for only one match in Budapest, in June 2008.

== ITF Junior finals ==
=== Doubles (4–5) ===
Legend (Win/Loss)
Category GA
Category G1
Category G2
Category G3
Category G4
Category G5

Result	No.	Date	Location	Grade	Surface	Partner	Opponents	Score
Win	1.	January 2001	Bratislava, Slovakia	G2	Carpet (i)	(Slovakia) Dominika Diešková	(Slovakia) Michala Bzduseková (Slovakia) Jarmila Gajdošová	w/o
Win	2.	October 2001	Hong Kong	G2	Hard	(Czech Republic) Andrea Hlaváčková	(Croatia) Matea Mezak (India) Sania Mirza	6–3, 2–6, 6–1
Loss	1.	December 2001	Bradenton, United States	G1	Hard	(Czech Republic) Andrea Hlaváčková	(Haiti) Neyssa Etienne (Mexico) Melissa Torres Sandoval	0–6, 3–6
Loss	2.	December 2001	Miami, United States	G3	Hard	(Czech Republic) Andrea Hlaváčková	(Romania) Liana Ungur (Romania) Delia Sescioreanu	3–6, 0–6
Loss	3.	July 2002	Essen, Germany	G1	Clay	(Czech Republic) Kateřina Böhmová	(Slovakia) Jarmila Gajdošová (Czech Republic) Andrea Hlaváčková	4–6, 2–6
Loss	4.	August 2002	Quebec, Canada	G1	Hard	(Slovenia) Andreja Klepač	(Chinese Taipei) Chan Chin-wei (Sweden) Hanna Nooni	6–3, 3–6, 3–6
Win	3.	October 2002	Osaka Mayor's Cup, Japan	GA	Hard	(Finland) Emma Laine	(Australia) Daniella Dominikovic (Australia) Sophie Ferguson	6–2, 6–0
Loss	5.	November 2002	Esch-sur-Alzette, Luxembourg	G1	Carpet (i)	(Finland) Emma Laine	(Germany) Anna-Lena Grönefeld (Germany) Andrea Petkovic	5–7, 2–6
Win	4.	January 2003	Melbourne, Australia	G1	Hard	(Finland) Emma Laine	(South Korea) Kim Ji-young (South Korea) Kim So-jung	6–3, 6–2
