= 2003 French Open =

- Date: 26 May – 8 June 2003
- Edition: 102
- Category: 73rd Grand Slam (ITF)
- Surface: Clay
- Location: Paris (XVI^{e}), France
- Venue: Stade Roland Garros

Champions

Men's singles
- (Spain) Juan Carlos Ferrero

Women's singles
- (Belgium) Justine Henin-Hardenne

Men's doubles
- (United States) Bob Bryan / (United States) Mike Bryan

Women's doubles
- (Belgium) Kim Clijsters / (Japan) Ai Sugiyama

Mixed doubles
- (United States) Lisa Raymond / (United States) Mike Bryan

Boys' singles
- (Switzerland) Stanislas Wawrinka

Girls' singles
- (Germany) Anna-Lena Grönefeld

Boys' doubles
- (Hungary) György Balázs / (Israel) Dudi Sela

Girls' doubles
- (Spain) Marta Fraga Pérez / (Spain) Adriana González Peñas
- French Open

The 2003 French Open was the second Grand Slam event of 2003 and the 102nd edition of the French Open. It took place at the Stade Roland Garros in Paris, France, from May 26 through June 8, 2003.

Both Albert Costa and Serena Williams were unsuccessful in their title defences, both being defeated in the semi-finals by eventual champions Juan Carlos Ferrero and Justine Henin-Hardenne respectively. Ferrero won his first Grand Slam title, defeating Martin Verkerk in the final, and Henin-Hardenne, who had previously won the event in 1997 as a junior, won after defeating Serena Williams, who had won the previous four Grand Slam events, in the semi-final and compatriot and rival Kim Clijsters in the final in straight sets. For Henin-Hardenne, it was the first of seven Grand Slam titles, and the first of four French Open titles.

== Seniors ==
=== Men's singles ===
(Spain) Juan Carlos Ferrero defeated (Netherlands) Martin Verkerk, (Note: Verkerk became only the third Dutch player, after Tom Okker and Richard Krajicek, to reach a Grand Slam men's singles final.) 6–1, 6–3, 6–2

- It was Ferrero's 3rd title of the year, and his 10th overall. It was his only Grand Slam title.

=== Women's singles ===
(Belgium) Justine Henin-Hardenne (Note: Henin became the first Belgian player (male or female) to win a Grand Slam singles title.) defeated (Belgium) Kim Clijsters, 6–0, 6–4 (Note: This was the first ever all-Belgian Grand Slam singles final.)

- It was Henin's 4th title of the year, and her 10th overall. It was her 1st of 7 career Grand Slam titles, and the first of her four French Open singles titles.

=== Men's doubles ===
(United States) Mike Bryan / (United States) Bob Bryan defeated (Netherlands) Paul Haarhuis / (Russia) Yevgeny Kafelnikov, 7–6, 6–3

- It was Michael and Robert's 1st career Grand Slam title.

=== Women's doubles ===
(Belgium) Kim Clijsters / (Japan) Ai Sugiyama defeated (Spain) Virginia Ruano Pascual / (Argentina) Paola Suárez, 6–7(5), 6–2, 9–7

- It was Clijsters's 1st career Grand Slam title.
- It was Sugiyama's 2nd career Grand Slam title, and her 1st French Open title.

=== Mixed doubles ===
(United States) Lisa Raymond / (United States) Mike Bryan defeated (Russia) Elena Likhovtseva / (India) Mahesh Bhupathi, 6–3, 6–4

== Top 5 seeds ==
Men's singles
1.	Lleyton Hewitt (AUS)	lost to	Tommy Robredo (ESP)	3rd round
2.	Andre Agassi (USA)	lost to	[7]Guillermo Coria (ARG)	Quarterfinal
3.	Juan Carlos Ferrero (ESP)	beat	Martin Verkerk (NED)	Final
4.	Carlos Moyá (ESP)	lost to	Martin Verkerk (NED)	Quarterfinal
5.	Roger Federer (SUI)	lost to	Luis Horna (PER)	1st round
Women's singles
1.	Serena Williams (USA)	lost to	[4]Justine Henin-Hardenne (BEL)	Semi-final
2.	Kim Clijsters (BEL)	lost to	[4]Justine Henin-Hardenne (BEL)	Final
3.	Venus Williams (USA)	lost to	[22]Vera Zvonareva (RUS)	4th round
4.	Justine Henin-Hardenne (BEL)	beat	[2]Kim Clijsters (BEL)	Final
5.	Amélie Mauresmo (FRA)	lost to	[1]Serena Williams (USA)	Quarterfinal

== Juniors ==
=== Boys' singles ===
(Switzerland) Stanislas Wawrinka (Note: Wawrinka reached in the final in 2015 and eventually won the singles' champion.) defeated (United States) Brian Baker, 7–5, 4–6, 6–3

=== Girls' singles ===
(Germany) Anna-Lena Grönefeld defeated (Russia) Vera Dushevina, 6–4, 6–4

=== Boys' doubles ===
(Hungary) György Balázs / (Israel) Dudi Sela defeated (Slovakia) Kamil Čapkovič / (Georgia (country)) Lado Chikhladze, 5–7, 6–1, 6–2

=== Girls' doubles ===
(Spain) Marta Fraga Pérez / (Spain) Adriana González Peñas defeated (Czech Republic) Kateřina Böhmová / (Netherlands) Michaëlla Krajicek, 6–0, 6–3

== Notes ==
Preceded by 2003 Australian Open	Grand Slams	Succeeded by 2003 Wimbledon Championships
