= 2003 Wimbledon Championships =

- Date: 23 June – 6 July
- Edition: 117th
- Category: Grand Slam (ITF)
- Draw: 128S/64D/64XD
- Prize money: £9,373,990
- Surface: Grass
- Location: Church Road; SW19, Wimbledon, London, United Kingdom
- Venue: All England Lawn Tennis and Croquet Club

Champions

Men's singles
- (Switzerland) Roger Federer

Women's singles
- (United States) Serena Williams

Men's doubles
- (Sweden) Jonas Björkman / (Australia) Todd Woodbridge

Women's doubles
- (Belgium) Kim Clijsters / (Japan) Ai Sugiyama

Mixed doubles
- (India) Leander Paes / (United States) Martina Navratilova

Boys' singles
- (Romania) Florin Mergea

Girls' singles
- (Belgium) Kirsten Flipkens

Boys' doubles
- (Romania) Florin Mergea / (Romania) Horia Tecău

Girls' doubles
- (Russia) Alisa Kleybanova / (India) Sania Mirza
- Wimbledon Championships

The 2003 Wimbledon Championships was a tennis tournament played on Grass courts at the All England Lawn Tennis and Croquet Club, Wimbledon, London, United Kingdom. It was the 117th edition of the Wimbledon Championships and were held from 23 June to 6 July 2003. It was the third Grand Slam tennis event of the year.

Lleyton Hewitt was unsuccessful in his 2002 title defence, being upset in the first round by Grand Slam debutant Ivo Karlović. It was the first time in the Open Era history of Wimbledon that a defending champion had lost in the first round, the second time overall. This Wimbledon was notable for being Roger Federer's first grand slam victory when he defeated Mark Philippoussis in the final. This would be the first of five consecutive Wimbledon titles for Federer, and eight overall. Serena Williams successfully defended her 2002 title, defeating her sister Venus in the final for the second consecutive year. The 2003 Championships were also the first time that bowing to the Royal Box on Centre Court was no longer required by the players.

== Media coverage ==
Broadcast coverage of the 2003 Championships was distributed to 159 territories worldwide and the tournament received more than 5,717 hours of coverage. This was an increase of 565 hours from the 2002 figure and surpassed all previous records for the event. The BBC transmitted 160 hours of coverage in the United Kingdom on BBC One and BBC Two. The official Championships website www.wimbledon.org received 242 million page views and 4.3 million visitors.

Prior to the start of the 2003 Championships, the All England Lawn Tennis and Croquet Club announced that it would begin purchasing insurance cover that would allow the club to cover losses in the event that a future tournament would be canceled as a result of a pandemic; this policy was announced in the wake of the SARS outbreak and required the club to pay £1.6 million per year.

== Prize money ==
The total prize money for 2003 championships was £9,373,990. The winner of the men's title earned £575,000 while the women's singles champion earned £535,000.

| Event | W | F | SF | QF | Round of 16 | Round of 32 | Round of 64 | Round of 128 |
| Men's singles | £575,000 | | | | | | | |
| Women's singles | £535,000 | | | | | | | |
| Men's doubles * | £210,000 | | | | | | | —N/a |
| Women's doubles * | £194,250 | | | | | | | —N/a |
| Mixed doubles * | £88,500 | | | | | | | —N/a |

_{* per team}

== Champions ==
=== Seniors ===
==== Men's singles ====
(Switzerland) Roger Federer defeated (Australia) Mark Philippoussis, 7–6^{(7–5)}, 6–2, 7–6^{(7–3)}

- It was Federer's 5th title of the year, and his 9th overall. It was his 1st career Grand Slam title. He became the first Swiss male player to win a Grand Slam singles title. It was the first, in what was to become 5 consecutive Wimbledon titles, and 8 overall. It was also the first Grand Slam title of the 20 won by Federer through the course of his career, a third place for the most Grand Slam singles titles in the history of the men's game.

==== Women's singles ====
(United States) Serena Williams defeated (United States) Venus Williams, 4–6, 6–4, 6–2

- It was Serena's 4th title of the year, and her 23rd overall. It was her 6th career Grand Slam title, and her 2nd at Wimbledon.

==== Men's doubles ====
(Sweden) Jonas Björkman / (Australia) Todd Woodbridge defeated (India) Mahesh Bhupathi / (Belarus) Max Mirnyi, 3–6, 6–3, 7–6^{(7–4)}, 6–3

==== Women's doubles ====
(Belgium) Kim Clijsters / (Japan) Ai Sugiyama defeated (Spain) Virginia Ruano Pascual / (Argentina) Paola Suárez, 6–4, 6–4

==== Mixed doubles ====
(India) Leander Paes / (United States) Martina Navratilova defeated (Israel) Andy Ram / (Russia) Anastasia Rodionova, 6–3, 6–3

=== Juniors ===
==== Boys' singles ====
(Romania) Florin Mergea defeated (Australia) Chris Guccione, 6–2, 7–6^{(7–3)}

==== Girls' singles ====
(Belgium) Kirsten Flipkens defeated (Russia) Anna Chakvetadze, 6–4, 3–6, 6–3

==== Boys' doubles ====
(Romania) Florin Mergea / (Romania) Horia Tecău defeated (Australia) Adam Feeney / (Australia) Chris Guccione, 7–6^{(7–4)}, 7–5

==== Girls' doubles ====
(Russia) Alisa Kleybanova / (India) Sania Mirza defeated (Czech Republic) Kateřina Böhmová / (Netherlands) Michaëlla Krajicek, 2–6, 6–3, 6–2

== Singles seeds ==
=== Men's singles ===
1. (Australia) Lleyton Hewitt (first round, lost to Ivo Karlović)
2. (United States) Andre Agassi (fourth round, lost to Mark Philippoussis)
3. (Spain) Juan Carlos Ferrero (fourth round, lost to Sébastien Grosjean)
4. (Switzerland) Roger Federer (champion)
5. (United States) Andy Roddick (semifinals, lost to Roger Federer)
6. (Argentina) David Nalbandian (fourth round, lost to Tim Henman)
7. (Argentina) Guillermo Coria (first round, lost to Olivier Rochus)
8. (Netherlands) Sjeng Schalken (quarterfinals, lost to Roger Federer)
9. (Germany) Rainer Schüttler (fourth round, lost to Sjeng Schalken)
10. (United Kingdom) Tim Henman (quarterfinals, lost to Sébastien Grosjean)
11. (Czech Republic) Jiří Novák (third round, lost to Alexander Popp)
12. (Thailand) Paradorn Srichaphan (fourth round, lost to Andy Roddick)
13. (France) Sébastien Grosjean (semifinals, lost to Mark Philippoussis)
14. (Belgium) Xavier Malisse (first round, lost to Cyril Saulnier)
15. (France) Arnaud Clément (second round, lost to Justin Gimelstob)
16. (Russia) Mikhail Youzhny (second round, lost to Feliciano López)
17. (Brazil) Gustavo Kuerten (second round, lost to Todd Martin)
18. (Russia) Marat Safin (withdrew due to injury)
19. (Chile) Fernando González (first round, lost to Jürgen Melzer)
20. (Russia) Yevgeny Kafelnikov (first round, lost to Raemon Sluiter)
21. (Netherlands) Martin Verkerk (first round, lost to Robin Söderling)
22. (Spain) Félix Mantilla (first round, lost to Frédéric Niemeyer)
23. (Argentina) Agustín Calleri (second round, lost to Flávio Saretta)
24. (Spain) Albert Costa (withdrew due to injury)
25. (Spain) Tommy Robredo (third round, lost to Andy Roddick)
26. (United States) James Blake (second round, lost to Sargis Sargsian)
27. (Morocco) Younes El Aynaoui (third round, lost to Andre Agassi)
28. (South Africa) Wayne Ferreira (first round, lost to Karol Kučera)
29. (Argentina) Gastón Gaudio (first round, lost to Mardy Fish)
30. (Finland) Jarkko Nieminen (third round, lost to Olivier Rochus)
31. (United States) Vince Spadea (first round, lost to Max Mirnyi)
32. (Argentina) Juan Ignacio Chela (second round, lost to Victor Hănescu)
33. (Russia) Nikolay Davydenko (first round, lost to Lee Childs)
34. (Spain) Àlex Corretja (withdrew due to personal reasons)
35. (Czech Republic) Radek Štěpánek (third round, lost to Mark Philippoussis)

=== Women's singles ===
1. (United States) Serena Williams (champion)
2. (Belgium) Kim Clijsters (semifinals, lost to Venus Williams)
3. (Belgium) Justine Henin-Hardenne (semifinals, lost to Serena Williams)
4. (United States) Venus Williams (final, lost to Serena Williams)
5. (United States) Lindsay Davenport (quarterfinals, lost to Venus Williams)
6. (France) Amélie Mauresmo (withdrew due to injury)
7. (United States) Chanda Rubin (third round, lost to Silvia Farina Elia)
8. (United States) Jennifer Capriati (quarterfinals, lost to Serena Williams)
9. (Slovakia) Daniela Hantuchová (second round, lost to Shinobu Asagoe)
10. (Russia) Anastasia Myskina (fourth round, lost to Jennifer Capriati)
11. (Serbia and Montenegro) Jelena Dokić (third round, lost to Maria Sharapova)
12. (Bulgaria) Magdalena Maleeva (second round, lost to Paola Suárez)
13. (Japan) Ai Sugiyama (fourth round, lost to Kim Clijsters)
14. (Greece) Eleni Daniilidou (second round, lost to Mary Pierce)
15. (Russia) Elena Dementieva (fourth round, lost to Serena Williams)
16. (Russia) Vera Zvonareva (fourth round, lost to Venus Williams)
17. (South Africa) Amanda Coetzer (second round, lost to Francesca Schiavone)
18. (Spain) Conchita Martínez (third round, lost to Anastasia Myskina)
19. (United States) Meghann Shaughnessy (first round, lost to Anikó Kapros)
20. (Switzerland) Patty Schnyder (first round, lost to Petra Mandula)
21. (Russia) Elena Bovina (second round, lost to Maria Sharapova)
22. (France) Nathalie Dechy (third round, lost to Ai Sugiyama)
23. (United States) Lisa Raymond (third round, lost to Mary Pierce)
24. (Spain) Magüi Serna (second round, lost to Maja Matevžič)
25. (Israel) Anna Pistolesi (first round, lost to Samantha Reeves)
26. (United States) Alexandra Stevenson (first round, lost to Émilie Loit)
27. (Italy) Silvia Farina Elia (quarterfinals, lost to Kim Clijsters)
28. (United States) Laura Granville (third round, lost to Serena Williams)
29. (Russia) Nadia Petrova (third round, lost to Venus Williams)
30. (Czech Republic) Denisa Chládková (second round, lost to Cara Black)
31. (Russia) Elena Likhovtseva (second round, lost to Alicia Molik)
32. (Thailand) Tamarine Tanasugarn (first round, lost to Akiko Morigami)
33. (Russia) Svetlana Kuznetsova (quarterfinals, lost to Justine Henin-Hardenne)

| Preceded by 2003 French Open | Grand Slams | Succeeded by 2003 US Open |
