= 2003 French Open – Mixed doubles =

Mixed doubles
- 2003 French Open

Final
- Champions: (United States) Lisa Raymond (United States) Mike Bryan
- Runners-up: (Russia) Elena Likhovtseva (India) Mahesh Bhupathi
- Score: 6–3, 6–4

Details
- Draw: 32
- Seeds: 8

Events
Singles	men	women		boys	girls
Doubles	men	women	mixed	boys	girls
WC Singles	men	women	quad
WC Doubles	men	women	quad
Legends	−45	45+	women
- French Open

Cara Black and Wayne Black were the defending champions, but lost in semifinals to Lisa Raymond and Mike Bryan.

Lisa Raymond and Mike Bryan won the title, defeating Elena Likhovtseva and Mahesh Bhupathi 6–3, 6–4 in the final. It was the 4th mixed doubles Grand Slam title for Raymond and the 2nd mixed doubles Grand Slam title for Bryan, in their respective careers.

== Seeds ==
1. (Argentina) Paola Suárez / (Australia) Todd Woodbridge (semifinal)
2. (United States) Lisa Raymond / (United States) Mike Bryan (champions)
3. (Russia) Elena Likhovtseva / (India) Mahesh Bhupathi (final)
4. (Zimbabwe) Cara Black / (Zimbabwe) Wayne Black (semifinal)
5. (Australia) Rennae Stubbs / (United States) Donald Johnson (first round)
6. (Slovakia) Janette Husárová / (Czech Republic) Tomáš Cibulec (first round)
7. (United States) Martina Navratilova / (India) Leander Paes (second round)
8. (Russia) Svetlana Kuznetsova / (United States) Jared Palmer (second round)

== Draw ==
Key

- Q = Qualifier
- WC = Wild card
- LL = Lucky loser
- Alt = Alternate
- ITF = ITF entry
- PR = Protected ranking
- SR = Special ranking
- SE = Special exempt
- JE = Junior exempt
- JR = Junior Accelerator Programme entrant
- CO = College Accelerator Programme entrant
- NG = Next Gen Accelerator Program entrant
- w/o = Walkover
- r = Retired
- d = Defaulted

=== Finals ===
Semifinals
1	(Argentina) Paola Suárez (Australia) Todd Woodbridge	5	6	2
3	(Russia) Elena Likhovtseva (India) Mahesh Bhupathi	7	3	6
4	(Zimbabwe) Cara Black (Zimbabwe) Wayne Black	3	4
2	(United States) Lisa Raymond (United States) Mike Bryan	6	6

Final
3	(Russia) Elena Likhovtseva (India) Mahesh Bhupathi	3	4
2	(United States) Lisa Raymond (United States) Mike Bryan	6	6

=== Top half ===
First round
1	(Argentina) P Suárez (Australia) T Woodbridge	6	6
WC	(France) C Gély (France) M Llodra	1	3
(Czech Republic) D Chládková (Czech Republic) M Damm	6	6
Alt	(Japan) N Miyagi (Argentina) M Rodríguez	2	2
(Indonesia) W Prakusya (South Africa) D Adams	3	2
(Slovenia) K Srebotnik (United States) B Bryan	6	6
(Austria) B Schett (The Bahamas) M Knowles	7	2	6
5	(Australia) R Stubbs (United States) D Johnson	5	6	3
3	(Russia) E Likhovtseva (India) M Bhupathi	6	6
WC	(France) T Golovin (Iran) M Bahrami	4	2
WC	(France) É Loit (France) N Coutelot	6	3	1
(South Africa) L Huber (Czech Republic) P Vízner	4	6	6
(Australia) N Pratt (Australia) P Hanley	6	6^{5}	4
(United States) C Morariu (Sweden) J Björkman	1	7^{7}	6
(Austria) P Wartusch (Australia) J Eagle	1	3
7	(United States) M Navratilova (India) L Paes	6	6

Second round
1	(Argentina) P Suárez (Australia) T Woodbridge	5	7	6
(Czech Republic) D Chládková (Czech Republic) M Damm	7	5	0
(Slovenia) K Srebotnik (United States) B Bryan	4	7	6
(Austria) B Schett (The Bahamas) M Knowles	6	5	1
3	(Russia) E Likhovtseva (India) M Bhupathi	7^{7}	3	6
(South Africa) L Huber (Czech Republic) P Vízner	6^{5}	6	3
(United States) C Morariu (Sweden) J Björkman	7^{7}	6
7	(United States) M Navratilova (India) L Paes	6^{5}	2

Quarterfinals
1	(Argentina) P Suárez (Australia) T Woodbridge	6	6
(Slovenia) K Srebotnik (United States) B Bryan	4	3
3	(Russia) E Likhovtseva (India) M Bhupathi	6	6
(United States) C Morariu (Sweden) J Björkman	4	3

Semifinals
1	(Argentina) P Suárez (Australia) T Woodbridge	5	6	2
3	(Russia) E Likhovtseva (India) M Bhupathi	7	3	6

=== Bottom half ===
First round
6	(Slovakia) J Husárová (Czech Republic) T Cibulec	1	0^{r}
(Israel) A Pistolesi (Czech Republic) L Friedl	6	0
WC	(France) S Lefèvre (France) J-F Bachelot	7	1	4
(Argentina) C Fernández (Argentina) G Etlis	5	6	6
(Belgium) E Callens (South Africa) R Koenig	4	0
(Hungary) P Mandula (United States) G Oliver	6	6
(Slovenia) T Križan (Czech Republic) F Čermák	4	6	1
4	(Zimbabwe) C Black (Zimbabwe) W Black	6	3	6
8	(Russia) S Kuznetsova (United States) J Palmer	6	6
(Chinese Taipei) J Lee (Canada) D Nestor	3	4
(Russia) N Petrova (Netherlands) P Haarhuis	6	7
(Switzerland) E Gagliardi (Czech Republic) C Suk	1	5
(Italy) F Schiavone (South Africa) C Haggard	6	7^{7}
(Slovakia) D Hantuchová (Zimbabwe) K Ullyett	3	6^{4}
WC	(France) V Razzano (France) A Dupuis	3	2
2	(United States) L Raymond (United States) M Bryan	6	6

Second round
(Israel) A Pistolesi (Czech Republic) L Friedl	6	3	4
(Argentina) C Fernández (Argentina) G Etlis	3	6	6
(Hungary) P Mandula (United States) G Oliver	3	6	4
4	(Zimbabwe) C Black (Zimbabwe) W Black	6	3	6
8	(Russia) S Kuznetsova (United States) J Palmer	6	5	2
(Russia) N Petrova (Netherlands) P Haarhuis	4	7	6
(Italy) F Schiavone (South Africa) C Haggard	6	0	2
2	(United States) L Raymond (United States) M Bryan	4	6	6

Quarterfinals
(Argentina) C Fernández (Argentina) G Etlis	3	3
4	(Zimbabwe) C Black (Zimbabwe) W Black	6	6
(Russia) N Petrova (Netherlands) P Haarhuis	2	1
2	(United States) L Raymond (United States) M Bryan	6	6

Semifinals
4	(Zimbabwe) C Black (Zimbabwe) W Black	3	4
2	(United States) L Raymond (United States) M Bryan	6	6
