= 2003 Wimbledon Championships – Men's doubles =

Men's doubles
- 2003 Wimbledon Championships

Final
- Champions: (Sweden) Jonas Björkman (Australia) Todd Woodbridge
- Runners-up: (India) Mahesh Bhupathi (Belarus) Max Mirnyi
- Score: 3–6, 6–3, 7–6^{(7–4)}, 6–3

Details
- Draw: 64 (4 Q / 7 WC )
- Seeds: 16

Events
Singles	men	women		boys	girls
Doubles	men	women	mixed	boys	girls
WC Singles	men	women	quad
WC Doubles	men	women	quad
Legends	men	women	seniors
← 2002 ·	Wimbledon Championships	· 2004 →

Jonas Björkman and Todd Woodbridge successfully defended their title, defeating Mahesh Bhupathi and Max Mirnyi in the final, 3–6, 6–3, 7–6^{(7–4)}, 6–3, to win the gentlemen's doubles title at the 2003 Wimbledon Championships

== Seeds ==
1. (India) Mahesh Bhupathi / (Belarus) Max Mirnyi (final)
2. (The Bahamas) Mark Knowles / (Canada) Daniel Nestor (quarterfinals)
3. (United States) Bob Bryan / (United States) Mike Bryan (quarterfinals)
4. (Sweden) Jonas Björkman / (Australia) Todd Woodbridge (champions)
5. (India) Leander Paes / (Czech Republic) David Rikl (semifinals)
6. (France) Michaël Llodra / (France) Fabrice Santoro (third round)
7. (Australia) Wayne Arthurs / (Australia) Paul Hanley (quarterfinals)
8. (Czech Republic) Martin Damm / (Czech Republic) Cyril Suk (quarterfinals)
9. (Australia) Joshua Eagle / (United States) Jared Palmer (third round)
10. (Zimbabwe) Wayne Black / (Zimbabwe) Kevin Ullyett (third round)
11. (South Africa) Chris Haggard / (South Africa) Robbie Koenig (first round)
12. (Czech Republic) František Čermák / (Czech Republic) Leoš Friedl (second round)
13. (Argentina) Gastón Etlis / (Argentina) Martín Rodríguez (third round)
14. (Netherlands) Paul Haarhuis / (Russia) Yevgeny Kafelnikov (third round)
15. (United States) Donald Johnson / (Serbia and Montenegro) Nenad Zimonjić (third round)
16. (Czech Republic) Tomáš Cibulec / (Czech Republic) Pavel Vízner (first round)

Click on the seed number of a player to go to their draw section.

== Draw ==
=== Key ===
- Q = Qualifier
- WC = Wild card
- LL = Lucky loser
- Alt = Alternate
- ITF = ITF entry
- PR = Protected ranking
- SR = Special ranking
- SE = Special exempt
- JE = Junior exempt
- JR = Junior Accelerator Programme entrant
- CO = College Accelerator Programme entrant
- NG = Next Gen Accelerator Program entrant
- w/o = Walkover
- r = Retired
- d = Defaulted

=== Finals ===
Quarterfinals
1	(India) Mahesh Bhupathi (Belarus) Max Mirnyi	7^{7}	7^{7}	6
8	(Czech Republic) Martin Damm (Czech Republic) Cyril Suk	6^{2}	6^{3}	3
3	(United States) Bob Bryan (United States) Mike Bryan	2	7^{7}	2	3
5	(India) Leander Paes (Czech Republic) David Rikl	6	6^{5}	6	6
7	(Australia) Wayne Arthurs (Australia) Paul Hanley	3	4	5
4	(Sweden) Jonas Björkman (Australia) Todd Woodbridge	6	6	7
(Israel) Jonathan Erlich (Israel) Andy Ram	7^{10}	7^{7}	7^{9}
2	(The Bahamas) Mark Knowles (Canada) Daniel Nestor	6^{8}	6^{2}	6^{7}

Semifinals
1	(India) Mahesh Bhupathi (Belarus) Max Mirnyi	6^{6}	6	7^{9}	6
5	(India) Leander Paes (Czech Republic) David Rikl	7^{8}	4	6^{7}	3
4	(Sweden) Jonas Björkman (Australia) Todd Woodbridge	6	4	6	6
(Israel) Jonathan Erlich (Israel) Andy Ram	2	6	2	1

Final
1	(India) Mahesh Bhupathi (Belarus) Max Mirnyi	6	3	6^{4}	3
4	(Sweden) Jonas Björkman (Australia) Todd Woodbridge	3	6	7^{7}	6

=== Top half ===
==== Section 1 ====
First round
1	(India) M Bhupathi (Belarus) M Mirnyi	6	6	6
WC	(United Kingdom) J Auckland (United Kingdom) L Childs	4	3	2
LL	(Israel) A Hadad (Pakistan) A-u-H Qureshi	6^{5}	5	5
(Czech Republic) J Novák (Czech Republic) R Štěpánek	7^{7}	7	7
(United States) D Bowen (Australia) A Fisher	6	7	6
Q	(Australia) S Huss (Sweden) J Landsberg	2	5	4
WC	(United Kingdom) R Bloomfield (United Kingdom) M Hilton	4	4	4
13	(Argentina) G Etlis (Argentina) M Rodríguez	6	6	6
10	(Zimbabwe) W Black (Zimbabwe) K Ullyett	7^{11}	4	6	6
(United States) J-M Gambill (United States) G Oliver	6^{9}	6	3	3
WC	(Spain) Á López Morón (Spain) F Mantilla	6	7^{7}	4	2	4
(Slovakia) K Beck (Slovakia) K Kučera	4	6^{4}	6	6	6
(Argentina) JI Chela (Argentina) M Zabaleta	6	6	6
WC	(United Kingdom) J Delgado (United Kingdom) A Parmar	1	4	1
(Argentina) L Arnold Ker (Argentina) M Hood	2	6	4	6^{5}
8	(Czech Republic) M Damm (Czech Republic) C Suk	6	2	6	7^{7}

Second round
1	(India) M Bhupathi (Belarus) M Mirnyi
(Czech Republic) J Novák (Czech Republic) R Štěpánek	w/o
(United States) D Bowen (Australia) A Fisher	6	6	3	3	1
13	(Argentina) G Etlis (Argentina) M Rodríguez	4	4	6	6	6
10	(Zimbabwe) W Black (Zimbabwe) K Ullyett	6	6	6
(Slovakia) K Beck (Slovakia) K Kučera	1	4	4
(Argentina) JI Chela (Argentina) M Zabaleta	4	2	4
8	(Czech Republic) M Damm (Czech Republic) C Suk	6	6	6

Third round
1	(India) M Bhupathi (Belarus) M Mirnyi	7^{7}	6	6
13	(Argentina) G Etlis (Argentina) M Rodríguez	6^{4}	3	3
10	(Zimbabwe) W Black (Zimbabwe) K Ullyett	7^{8}	5	3	6	3
8	(Czech Republic) M Damm (Czech Republic) C Suk	6^{6}	7	6	3	6

Quarterfinals
1	(India) M Bhupathi (Belarus) M Mirnyi	7^{7}	7^{7}	6
8	(Czech Republic) M Damm (Czech Republic) C Suk	6^{2}	6^{3}	3

==== Section 2 ====
First round
3	(United States) B Bryan (United States) M Bryan	4	6	6	6
(Netherlands) R Sluiter (Netherlands) M Verkerk	6	3	4	4
(Argentina) A Calleri (Argentina) S Roitman	3	5	1
(Argentina) M García (Argentina) D Nalbandian	6	7	6
(Sweden) S Aspelin (South Africa) M Wakefield	6	6	7^{7}
WC	(United Kingdom) J Marray (United Kingdom) D Sherwood	4	2	6^{4}
(Italy) M Bertolini (Czech Republic) P Pála	3	3	6	2
15	(United States) D Johnson (Serbia and Montenegro) N Zimonjić	6	6	2	6
11	(South Africa) C Haggard (South Africa) R Koenig	6	6^{5}	4	6^{4}
WC	(Ecuador) G Lapentti (Ecuador) N Lapentti	4	7^{7}	6	7^{7}
Q	(Australia) T Perry (Japan) T Shimada	6	6^{5}	6^{5}	4
(Australia) J Kerr (Argentina) S Prieto	4	7^{7}	7^{7}	6
(Australia) A Kratzmann (United States) J Tarango	6^{3}	1	4
(Germany) N Kiefer (Germany) D Prinosil	7^{7}	6	6
(Spain) JI Carrasco (Spain) JC Ferrero	3	3	4
5	(India) L Paes (Czech Republic) D Rikl	6	6	6

Second round
3	(United States) B Bryan (United States) M Bryan
(Argentina) M García (Argentina) D Nalbandian	w/o
(Sweden) S Aspelin (South Africa) M Wakefield	4	6	3	6^{7}
15	(United States) D Johnson (Serbia and Montenegro) N Zimonjić	6	3	6	7^{9}
WC	(Ecuador) G Lapentti (Ecuador) N Lapentti	2	7^{7}	7^{7}	6
(Australia) J Kerr (Argentina) S Prieto	6	6^{3}	6^{3}	3
(Germany) N Kiefer (Germany) D Prinosil	4	4	4
5	(India) L Paes (Czech Republic) D Rikl	6	6	6

Third round
3	(United States) B Bryan (United States) M Bryan	6	3	6	6
15	(United States) D Johnson (Serbia and Montenegro) N Zimonjić	3	6	2	3
WC	(Ecuador) G Lapentti (Ecuador) N Lapentti	6	3	6^{5}	3
5	(India) L Paes (Czech Republic) D Rikl	3	6	7^{7}	6

Quarterfinals
3	(United States) B Bryan (United States) M Bryan	2	7^{7}	2	3
5	(India) L Paes (Czech Republic) D Rikl	6	6^{5}	6	6

=== Bottom half ===
==== Section 3 ====
First round
7	(Australia) W Arthurs (Australia) P Hanley	6^{1}	6	6	6
(United States) R Kendrick (United States) V Spadea	7^{7}	4	4	4
(United States) R Leach (United States) B MacPhie	6	6	6
(Russia) N Davydenko (South Africa) J-L de Jager	2	2	3
LL	(Australia) S Draper (Australia) P Luczak	4	7	7^{7}	6
(Spain) D Ferrer (Spain) A Martín	6	5	6^{5}	4
(Spain) A Portas (Spain) T Robredo	6	3	4	4
9	(Australia) J Eagle (United States) J Palmer	4	6	6	6
14	(Netherlands) P Haarhuis (Russia) Y Kafelnikov	6	6	6
Q	(Switzerland) M Chiudinelli (Croatia) L Zovko	1	2	2
(Belgium) X Malisse (Belgium) T Vanhoudt	6	1
(Spain) F López (Spain) F Vicente	3	1^{r}
(Austria) J Melzer (Finland) J Nieminen	5	4	6^{6}
(Morocco) H Arazi (Morocco) Y El Aynaoui	7	6	7^{8}
(Croatia) M Ančić (Austria) J Knowle	4	1	2
4	(Sweden) J Björkman (Australia) T Woodbridge	6	6	6

Second round
7	(Australia) W Arthurs (Australia) P Hanley	6^{11}	6	7	6
(United States) R Leach (United States) B MacPhie	7^{13}	4	5	3
LL	(Australia) S Draper (Australia) P Luczak	6^{2}	3	4
9	(Australia) J Eagle (United States) J Palmer	7^{7}	6	6
14	(Netherlands) P Haarhuis (Russia) Y Kafelnikov	4	6	7	6
(Belgium) X Malisse (Belgium) T Vanhoudt	6	3	5	2
(Morocco) H Arazi (Morocco) Y El Aynaoui	2	3	0^{r}
4	(Sweden) J Björkman (Australia) T Woodbridge	6	6	0

Third round
7	(Australia) W Arthurs (Australia) P Hanley	7^{9}	5	7^{7}	6
9	(Australia) J Eagle (United States) J Palmer	6^{7}	7	6^{4}	3
14	(Netherlands) P Haarhuis (Russia) Y Kafelnikov	w/o
4	(Sweden) J Björkman (Australia) T Woodbridge

Quarterfinals
7	(Australia) W Arthurs (Australia) P Hanley	3	4	5
4	(Sweden) J Björkman (Australia) T Woodbridge	6	6	7

==== Section 4 ====
First round
6	(France) M Llodra (France) F Santoro	6	6	6
(United States) J Thomas (Czech Republic) D Vacek	1	4	4
(South Africa) D Adams (United States) J Gimelstob	6	6	6^{4}	6
(France) A Dupuis (France) P-H Mathieu	4	4	7^{7}	3
Q	(Israel) J Erlich (Israel) A Ram	4	7	4	6	6
(Australia) N Healey (Czech Republic) D Škoch	6	5	6	3	4
(Argentina) J Acasuso (Argentina) A Schneiter	3	6	3	6^{3}
12	(Czech Republic) F Čermák (Czech Republic) L Friedl	6	3	6	7^{7}
16	(Czech Republic) T Cibulec (Czech Republic) P Vízner	6	3	3	4
(Slovakia) D Hrbatý (Brazil) A Sá	2	6	6	6
(Czech Republic) O Fukárek (Czech Republic) P Luxa	6	3	1
(South Korea) H-t Lee (Belarus) V Voltchkov	4	6	0^{r}
(United States) S Humphries (The Bahamas) M Merklein	6^{2}	6^{6}	4
WC	(United Kingdom) M Lee (Zambia) M Maclagan	7^{7}	7^{8}	6
(Russia) A Olhovskiy (Armenia) S Sargsian	6^{4}	6^{4}	6^{6}
2	(The Bahamas) M Knowles (Canada) D Nestor	7^{7}	7^{7}	7^{8}

Second round
6	(France) M Llodra (France) F Santoro	7	5	4	6	6
(South Africa) D Adams (United States) J Gimelstob	5	7	6	3	4
Q	(Israel) J Erlich (Israel) A Ram	6	6	6
12	(Czech Republic) F Čermák (Czech Republic) L Friedl	3	3	3
(Slovakia) D Hrbatý (Brazil) A Sá	5	6	6	6
(Czech Republic) O Fukárek (Czech Republic) P Luxa	7	4	4	4
WC	(United Kingdom) M Lee (Zambia) M Maclagan	6	3	2	5
2	(The Bahamas) M Knowles (Canada) D Nestor	4	6	6	7

Third round
6	(France) M Llodra (France) F Santoro	2	1	3
Q	(Israel) J Erlich (Israel) A Ram	6	6	6
(Slovakia) D Hrbatý (Brazil) A Sá	3	6^{5}	5
2	(The Bahamas) M Knowles (Canada) D Nestor	6	7^{7}	7

Quarterfinals
Q	(Israel) J Erlich (Israel) A Ram	7^{10}	7^{7}	7^{9}
2	(The Bahamas) M Knowles (Canada) D Nestor	6^{8}	6^{2}	6^{7}
