= 2003 Wimbledon Championships – Women's singles =

Women's singles
- 2003 Wimbledon Championships

Final
- Champion: (United States) Serena Williams
- Runner-up: (United States) Venus Williams
- Score: 4–6, 6–4, 6–2

Details
- Draw: 128 (12 Q / 8 WC )
- Seeds: 32

Events
Singles	men	women		boys	girls
Doubles	men	women	mixed	boys	girls
WC Singles	men	women	quad
WC Doubles	men	women	quad
Legends	men	women	seniors
← 2002 ·	Wimbledon Championships	· 2004 →

Defending champion Serena Williams defeated her sister Venus Williams in a rematch of the previous year's final, 4–6, 6–4, 6–2 to win the ladies' singles tennis title at the 2003 Wimbledon Championships. It was her second Wimbledon singles title and sixth major singles title overall.

This marked the first Wimbledon appearance of future world No. 1 and five-time major champion Maria Sharapova; she lost to Svetlana Kuznetsova in the fourth round. Sharapova would win the title the following year. It was also the first Wimbledon appearance of future champion Marion Bartoli, who lost to Daniela Hantuchová in the first round.

The semifinals featured the top four seeds, which last occurred in 1995. This was the first major since the 1987 Australian Open to not feature Steffi Graf, Monica Seles or Arantxa Sánchez Vicario.

== Seeds ==
1. (United States) Serena Williams (champion)
2. (Belgium) Kim Clijsters (semifinals)
3. (Belgium) Justine Henin-Hardenne (semifinals)
4. (United States) Venus Williams (final)
5. (United States) Lindsay Davenport (quarterfinals)
6. (France) Amélie Mauresmo (withdrew)
7. (United States) Chanda Rubin (third round)
8. (United States) Jennifer Capriati (quarterfinals)
9. (Slovakia) Daniela Hantuchová (second round)
10. (Russia) Anastasia Myskina (fourth round)
11. (Serbia and Montenegro) Jelena Dokić (third round)
12. (Bulgaria) Magdalena Maleeva (second round)
13. (Japan) Ai Sugiyama (fourth round)
14. (Greece) Eleni Daniilidou (second round)
15. (Russia) Elena Dementieva (fourth round)
16. (Russia) Vera Zvonareva (fourth round)
17. (South Africa) Amanda Coetzer (second round)
18. (Spain) Conchita Martínez (third round)
19. (United States) Meghann Shaughnessy (first round)
20. (Switzerland) Patty Schnyder (first round)
21. (Russia) Elena Bovina (second round)
22. (France) Nathalie Dechy (third round)
23. (United States) Lisa Raymond (third round)
24. (Spain) Magüi Serna (second round)
25. (Israel) Anna Pistolesi (first round)
26. (United States) Alexandra Stevenson (first round)
27. (Italy) Silvia Farina Elia (quarterfinals)
28. (United States) Laura Granville (third round)
29. (Russia) Nadia Petrova (third round)
30. (Czech Republic) Denisa Chládková (second round)
31. (Russia) Elena Likhovtseva (second round)
32. (Thailand) Tamarine Tanasugarn (first round)
33. (Russia) Svetlana Kuznetsova (quarterfinals)

Click on the seed number of a player to go to their draw section.

Amélie Mauresmo withdrew due to a rib injury. She was replaced in the draw by the highest-ranked non-seeded player Svetlana Kuznetsova, who became the #33 seed.

== Draw ==
=== Key ===
- Q = Qualifier
- WC = Wild card
- LL = Lucky loser
- Alt = Alternate
- ITF = ITF entry
- PR = Protected ranking
- SR = Special ranking
- SE = Special exempt
- JE = Junior exempt
- JR = Junior Accelerator Programme entrant
- CO = College Accelerator Programme entrant
- NG = Next Gen Accelerator Program entrant
- w/o = Walkover
- r = Retired
- d = Defaulted

=== Finals ===
Quarterfinals
1	(United States) Serena Williams	2	6	6
8	(United States) Jennifer Capriati	6	2	3
3	(Belgium) Justine Henin-Hardenne	6	6
33	(Russia) Svetlana Kuznetsova	2	2
5	(United States) Lindsay Davenport	2	6	1
4	(United States) Venus Williams	6	2	6
27	(Italy) Silvia Farina Elia	7	0	1
2	(Belgium) Kim Clijsters	5	6	6

Semifinals
1	(United States) Serena Williams	6	6
3	(Belgium) Justine Henin-Hardenne	3	2
4	(United States) Venus Williams	4	6	6
2	(Belgium) Kim Clijsters	6	3	1

Final
1	(United States) Serena Williams	4	6	6
4	(United States) Venus Williams	6	4	2

=== Top half ===
==== Section 1 ====
First round
1	(United States) S Williams	6	6
(United States) J Craybas	3	3
(Belgium) E Callens	6	7
(Germany) B Rittner	3	5
Q	(Czech Republic) B Strýcová	4	7	9
(Ukraine) T Perebiynis	6	5	11
(Russia) A Jidkova	1	4
28	(United States) L Granville	6	6
19	(United States) M Shaughnessy	3	2
Q	(Hungary) A Kapros	6	6
(Spain) G León García	2	6	1
Q	(Slovakia) M Suchá	6	4	6
LL	(Spain) A Parra Santonja	7	6
(Czech Republic) Z Ondrášková	5	2
(Germany) A Rösch	2	1
15	(Russia) E Dementieva	6	6

Second round
1	(United States) S Williams	6	6
(Belgium) E Callens	4	4
(Ukraine) T Perebiynis	2	3
28	(United States) L Granville	6	6
Q	(Hungary) A Kapros	6	6
Q	(Slovakia) M Suchá	0	4
LL	(Spain) A Parra Santonja	1	1
15	(Russia) E Dementieva	6	6

Third round
1	(United States) S Williams	6	6
28	(United States) L Granville	3	1
Q	(Hungary) A Kapros	3	1
15	(Russia) E Dementieva	6	6

Fourth round
1	(United States) S Williams	6	6
15	(Russia) E Dementieva	2	2

==== Section 2 ====
First round
10	(Russia) A Myskina	6	3
(Slovakia) H Nagyová	4	0^{r}
(Russia) L Krasnoroutskaya	6	6
WC	(United Kingdom) J Pullin	3	1
(Austria) B Schett	6	6
(Spain) M Marrero	1	2
Q	(Venezuela) M Sequera	7	5	1
18	(Spain) C Martínez	5	7	6
32	(Thailand) T Tanasugarn	4	3
(Japan) A Morigami	6	6
(Croatia) K Šprem	6	7^{8}
(Czech Republic) I Benešová	2	6^{6}
(United States) M Irvin	5	6	6
(Switzerland) M-G Mikaelian	7	2	8
(Switzerland) M Casanova	1	3
8	(United States) J Capriati	6	6

Second round
10	(Russia) A Myskina	6	6
(Russia) L Krasnoroutskaya	1	4
(Austria) B Schett	2	4
18	(Spain) C Martínez	6	6
(Japan) A Morigami	6	6
(Croatia) K Šprem	3	3
(Switzerland) M-G Mikaelian	2	1
8	(United States) J Capriati	6	6

Third round
10	(Russia) A Myskina	6	6
18	(Spain) C Martínez	3	3
(Japan) A Morigami	4	4
8	(United States) J Capriati	6	6

Fourth round
10	(Russia) A Myskina	2	3
8	(United States) J Capriati	6	6

==== Section 3 ====
First round
3	(Belgium) J Henin-Hardenne	7	6
(Ukraine) J Vakulenko	5	1
WC	(United States) C Morariu	3	2
(Italy) F Pennetta	6	6
(Russia) D Safina	1	6	4
(Australia) A Molik	6	4	6
(United States) L Lee-Waters	6	2	6
31	(Russia) E Likhovtseva	4	6	8
23	(United States) L Raymond	6	6
(France) S Foretz	3	3
WC	(United Kingdom) J O'Donoghue	4	2
(Germany) M Weingärtner	6	6
(France) M Pierce	6	6
(United States) A Cargill	0	0
(Croatia) J Kostanić	2	2
14	(Greece) E Daniilidou	6	6

Second round
3	(Belgium) J Henin-Hardenne	7^{7}	6
(Italy) F Pennetta	6^{2}	1
(Australia) A Molik	6	6
31	(Russia) E Likhovtseva	3	4
23	(United States) L Raymond	6	6
(Germany) M Weingärtner	3	0
(France) M Pierce	6	6
14	(Greece) E Daniilidou	4	1

Third round
3	(Belgium) J Henin-Hardenne	6	6
(Australia) A Molik	4	4
23	(United States) L Raymond	6	3	5
(France) M Pierce	4	6	7

Fourth round
3	(Belgium) J Henin-Hardenne	6	6
(France) M Pierce	3	3

==== Section 4 ====
First round
11	(Serbia and Montenegro) J Dokić	6	1	6
WC	(United Kingdom) E Baltacha	3	6	4
(Switzerland) E Gagliardi	6	4	6
(France) S Cohen-Aloro	2	6	3
WC	(Russia) M Sharapova	6	6
(United States) A Harkleroad	2	1
(Japan) S Obata	6^{5}	6	6
21	(Russia) E Bovina	7^{7}	2	8
26	(United States) A Stevenson	5	6^{2}
(France) É Loit	7	7^{7}
Q	(United States) L Osterloh	1	4
(Italy) ME Camerin	6	6
(Spain) C Torrens Valero	5	6	7
(South Korea) Y-j Cho	7	1	9
Q	(United States) B Bielik	1	3
33	(Russia) S Kuznetsova	6	6

Second round
11	(Serbia and Montenegro) J Dokić	6	6
(Switzerland) E Gagliardi	1	3
WC	(Russia) M Sharapova	6	6
21	(Russia) E Bovina	3	1
(France) É Loit	3	6	6
(Italy) ME Camerin	6	2	3
(South Korea) Y-j Cho	6^{1}	4
33	(Russia) S Kuznetsova	7^{7}	6

Third round
11	(Serbia and Montenegro) J Dokić	4	4
WC	(Russia) M Sharapova	6	6
(France) É Loit	1	2
33	(Russia) S Kuznetsova	6	6

Fourth round
WC	(Russia) M Sharapova	1	6	5
33	(Russia) S Kuznetsova	6	2	7

=== Bottom half ===
==== Section 5 ====
First round
5	(United States) L Davenport	7^{7}	7
WC	(Australia) S Stosur	6^{3}	5
(Italy) R Grande	6	6
(Austria) P Wartusch	1	4
(Zimbabwe) C Black	6	6
(Czech Republic) S Kleinová	2	3
(Czech Republic) K Koukalová	4	3
30	(Czech Republic) D Chládková	6	6
17	(South Africa) A Coetzer	6	3	6
(Madagascar) D Randriantefy	1	6	3
LL	(Netherlands) S Noorlander	2	2
(Italy) F Schiavone	6	6
Q	(Chinese Taipei) J Lee	3	6^{2}
(Japan) S Asagoe	6	7^{7}
(France) M Bartoli	4	1
9	(Slovakia) D Hantuchová	6	6

Second round
5	(United States) L Davenport	6	6
(Italy) R Grande	3	1
(Zimbabwe) C Black	6	7
30	(Czech Republic) D Chládková	3	5
17	(South Africa) A Coetzer	6	5	4
(Italy) F Schiavone	4	7	6
(Japan) S Asagoe	0	6	12
9	(Slovakia) D Hantuchová	6	4	10

Third round
5	(United States) L Davenport	6	6
(Zimbabwe) C Black	2	2
(Italy) F Schiavone	5	2
(Japan) S Asagoe	7	6

Fourth round
5	(United States) L Davenport	6	6
(Japan) S Asagoe	4	1

==== Section 6 ====
First round
16	(Russia) V Zvonareva	6	6
(Australia) E Dominikovic	0	2
(Spain) C Martínez Granados	0	6	10
(Italy) An Serra Zanetti	6	3	8
Q	(United States) C Gullickson	5	4
(Uzbekistan) I Tulyaganova	7	6
(Hungary) P Mandula	7^{7}	6
20	(Switzerland) P Schnyder	6^{2}	3
29	(Russia) N Petrova	6	6
(Italy) T Garbin	1	3
(Russia) E Kulikovskaya	5	1
(Indonesia) A Widjaja	7	6
WC	(United Kingdom) A Keothavong	2	0^{r}
(Slovenia) K Srebotnik	6	4
Q	(Slovakia) S Hrozenská	2	2
4	(United States) V Williams	6	6

Second round
16	(Russia) V Zvonareva	6	6
(Spain) C Martínez Granados	3	1
(Uzbekistan) I Tulyaganova	6	6
(Hungary) P Mandula	3	4
29	(Russia) N Petrova	7^{7}	6
(Indonesia) A Widjaja	6^{3}	3
(Slovenia) K Srebotnik	4	1
4	(United States) V Williams	6	6

Third round
16	(Russia) V Zvonareva	6	7
(Uzbekistan) I Tulyaganova	3	5
29	(Russia) N Petrova	1	2
4	(United States) V Williams	6	6

Fourth round
16	(Russia) V Zvonareva	1	3
4	(United States) V Williams	6	6

==== Section 7 ====
First round
7	(United States) C Rubin	6	6
(Croatia) I Majoli	3	0
(Croatia) S Talaja	2	2
(United States) A Frazier	6	6
(Australia) N Pratt	6	4	4
Q	(Canada) M Drake	4	6	6
(Spain) M Sánchez Lorenzo	4	2
27	(Italy) S Farina Elia	6	6
24	(Spain) M Serna	6	7
(Spain) V Ruano Pascual	3	5
(Slovenia) T Pisnik	6^{6}	6	4
(Slovenia) M Matevžič	7^{8}	2	6
(Argentina) P Suárez	6	6
Q	(Tunisia) S Sfar	1	2
(Germany) A Barna	0	1
12	(Bulgaria) M Maleeva	6	6

Second round
7	(United States) C Rubin	6	6
(United States) A Frazier	4	4
Q	(Canada) M Drake	6^{3}	1
27	(Italy) S Farina Elia	7^{7}	6
24	(Spain) M Serna	6	3	4
(Slovenia) M Matevžič	4	6	6
(Argentina) P Suárez	2	6	6
12	(Bulgaria) M Maleeva	6	2	3

Third round
7	(United States) C Rubin	6^{6}	3
27	(Italy) S Farina Elia	7^{8}	6
(Slovenia) M Matevžič	7	3	5
(Argentina) P Suárez	5	6	7

Fourth round
27	(Italy) S Farina Elia	7	7^{7}
(Argentina) P Suárez	5	6^{3}

==== Section 8 ====
First round
13	(Japan) A Sugiyama	3	6	6
WC	(United Kingdom) L Ahl	6	4	4
(Slovakia) Ľ Cervanová	6^{6}	6	4
Q	(Slovakia) E Fislová	7^{8}	2	6
(Czech Republic) D Bedáňová	6	4	6
(Belarus) T Poutchek	3	6	4
(Slovakia) J Husárová	3	2
22	(France) N Dechy	6	6
25	(Israel) A Pistolesi	4	4
(United States) S Reeves	6	6
(Colombia) F Zuluaga	6	6
(Argentina) C Fernández	4	2
(France) V Razzano	6	6
(Russia) A Rodionova	3	1
(Paraguay) R Neffa-de los Ríos	0	0
2	(Belgium) K Clijsters	6	6

Second round
13	(Japan) A Sugiyama	6	6^{6}	7
Q	(Slovakia) E Fislová	1	7^{8}	5
(Czech Republic) D Bedáňová	2	4
22	(France) N Dechy	6	6
(United States) S Reeves	7^{8}	6
(Colombia) F Zuluaga	6^{6}	4
(France) V Razzano	1	3
2	(Belgium) K Clijsters	6	6

Third round
13	(Japan) A Sugiyama	6	6
22	(France) N Dechy	4	4
(United States) S Reeves	1	2
2	(Belgium) K Clijsters	6	6

Fourth round
13	(Japan) A Sugiyama	3	2
2	(Belgium) K Clijsters	6	6

Preceded by 2003 French Open – Women's singles	Grand Slam women's singles	Succeeded by 2003 US Open – Women's singles
