= 2003 French Open – Women's doubles =

Women's doubles
- 2003 French Open

Final
- Champion: (Belgium) Kim Clijsters (Japan) Ai Sugiyama
- Runner-up: (Spain) Virginia Ruano Pascual (Argentina) Paola Suárez
- Score: 6–7^{(5–7)}, 6–2, 9–7

Details
- Draw: 64 (7 WC )
- Seeds: 16

Events
Singles	men	women		boys	girls
Doubles	men	women	mixed	boys	girls
WC Singles	men	women	quad
WC Doubles	men	women	quad
Legends	−45	45+	women
← 2002 ·	French Open	· 2004 →

Virginia Ruano Pascual and Paola Suárez were the two-time defending champions, but were defeated in the final by Kim Clijsters and Ai Sugiyama 7–6^{(7–5)}, 2–6, 7–9.

== Seeds ==
1. (Spain) Virginia Ruano Pascual / (Argentina) Paola Suárez (finals)
2. (Belgium) Kim Clijsters / (Japan) Ai Sugiyama (champions)
3. (United States) Lindsay Davenport / (United States) Lisa Raymond (third round)
4. (Zimbabwe) Cara Black / (Russia) Elena Likhovtseva (semifinals)
5. (Serbia and Montenegro) Jelena Dokic / (Russia) Nadia Petrova (third round)
6. (Russia) Svetlana Kuznetsova / (United States) Martina Navratilova (third round)
7. (Hungary) Petra Mandula / (Austria) Patricia Wartusch (third round)
8. (United States) Liezel Huber / (Bulgaria) Magdalena Maleeva (first round)
9. (Slovakia) Daniela Hantuchová / (United States) Chanda Rubin (semifinals)
10. (Spain) Conchita Martínez / (United States) Meghann Shaughnessy (first round)
11. (Slovakia) Janette Husárová / (Austria) Barbara Schett (quarterfinals)
12. (France) Nathalie Dechy / (France) Émilie Loit (quarterfinals)
13. (Slovenia) Tina Križan / (Slovenia) Katarina Srebotnik (second round)
14. (Japan) Shinobu Asagoe / (Japan) Nana Smith (second round)
15. (Switzerland) Emmanuelle Gagliardi / (Switzerland) Patty Schnyder (third round)
16. (Chinese Taipei) Janet Lee / (Indonesia) Wynne Prakusya (first round)

== Draw ==
=== Key ===
- Q = Qualifier
- WC = Wild card
- LL = Lucky loser
- Alt = Alternate
- SE = Special exempt
- PR = Protected ranking
- ITF = ITF entry
- JE = Junior exempt
- w/o = Walkover
- r = Retired
- d = Defaulted
- SR = Special ranking

=== Finals ===
Quarterfinals
1	(Spain) Virginia Ruano Pascual (Argentina) Paola Suárez	6	6
11	(Slovakia) Janette Husárová (Austria) Barbara Schett	1	3
(Russia) Elena Bovina (Australia) Alicia Molik	3	1
9	(Slovakia) Daniela Hantuchová (United States) Chanda Rubin	6	6
12	(France) Nathalie Dechy (France) Émilie Loit	4	6^{1}
4	(Zimbabwe) Cara Black (Russia) Elena Likhovtseva	6	7^{7}
(Slovenia) Maja Matevžič (Slovakia) Henrieta Nagyová	2	5
2	(Belgium) Kim Clijsters (Japan) Ai Sugiyama	6	7

Semifinals
1	(Spain) Virginia Ruano Pascual (Argentina) Paola Suárez	6	7^{7}
9	(Slovakia) Daniela Hantuchová (United States) Chanda Rubin	2	6^{5}
4	(Zimbabwe) Cara Black (Russia) Elena Likhovtseva	1	4
2	(Belgium) Kim Clijsters (Japan) Ai Sugiyama	6	6

Finals
1	(Spain) Virginia Ruano Pascual (Argentina) Paola Suárez	7^{7}	2	7
2	(Belgium) Kim Clijsters (Japan) Ai Sugiyama	6^{5}	6	9

=== Top half ===
==== Section 1 ====
First round
1	(Spain) V Ruano Pascual (Argentina) P Suárez	6	6
(South Africa) A Coetzer (South Africa) J Steck	1	2
(Czech Republic) D Bedáňová (Italy) R Vinci	3^{r}
(Spain) M Marrero (Paraguay) R de los Ríos	2
(Croatia) I Majoli (Uzbekistan) I Tulyaganova	6	7^{7}
(United States) L Granville (United States) A Stevenson	3	6^{5}
(Hungary) K Marosi (United States) S Reeves	2	1
13	(Slovenia) T Križan (Slovenia) K Srebotnik	6	6
11	(Slovakia) J Husárová (Austria) B Schett	6	6
WC	(France) S Beltrame (France) C Pin	2	3
(Australia) C Barclay (Australia) R McQuillan	7^{7}	6
(Australia) L McShea (Kazakhstan) I Selyutina	6^{2}	4
(France) M Bartoli (Switzerland) M Casanova	6	3	6
(South Africa) N de Villiers (South Africa) N Grandin	3	6	3
(Spain) C Martínez Granados (Spain) MJ Martínez Sánchez	1	7	2
5	(Federal Republic of Yugoslavia) J Dokic (Russia) N Petrova	6	5	6

Second round
1	(Spain) V Ruano Pascual (Argentina) P Suárez	6	6
(Spain) M Marrero (Paraguay) R de los Ríos	1	0
(Croatia) I Majoli (Uzbekistan) I Tulyaganova	7^{9}	6
13	(Slovenia) T Križan (Slovenia) K Srebotnik	6^{7}	2
11	(Slovakia) J Husárová (Austria) B Schett	6	7
(Australia) C Barclay (Australia) R McQuillan	2	5
(France) M Bartoli (Switzerland) M Casanova	2	1
5	(Federal Republic of Yugoslavia) J Dokic (Russia) N Petrova	6	6

Third round
1	(Spain) V Ruano Pascual (Argentina) P Suárez	6	6
(Croatia) I Majoli (Uzbekistan) I Tulyaganova	4	1
11	(Slovakia) J Husárová (Austria) B Schett	7^{9}	6
5	(Federal Republic of Yugoslavia) J Dokic (Russia) N Petrova	6^{7}	4

Quarterfinals
1	(Spain) V Ruano Pascual (Argentina) P Suárez	6	6
11	(Slovakia) J Husárová (Austria) B Schett	1	3

==== Section 2 ====
First round
3	(United States) L Davenport (United States) L Raymond	6	7^{13}
(Bulgaria) L Bacheva (France) C Dhenin	4	6^{11}
WC	(France) M Johansson (France) S Montero	1	2
(Argentina) G Dulko (Argentina) ME Salerni	6	6
(Russia) E Bovina (Australia) A Molik	7^{7}	7^{7}
WC	(France) S Lefèvre (France) V Pichet	6^{3}	6^{2}
(Australia) T Musgrave (Ukraine) E Tatarkova	1	2
14	(Japan) S Asagoe (Japan) N Miyagi	6	6
9	(Slovakia) D Hantuchová (United States) C Rubin	7	6
(Netherlands) K Boogert (Spain) M Serna	5	1
(Argentina) P Tarabini (Netherlands) C Vis	6^{3}	6	6
(Russia) G Fattakhetdinova (Russia) G Fokina	7^{7}	3	4
(Germany) K Freye (Federal Republic of Yugoslavia) D Zarić	1	4
(Russia) A Jidkova (Japan) A Morigami	6	6
WC	(France) É Le Bescond (France) C Rousseau	0	2
6	(Russia) S Kuznetsova (United States) M Navratilova	6	6

Second round
3	(United States) L Davenport (United States) L Raymond	6	6
(Argentina) G Dulko (Argentina) ME Salerni	4	0
(Russia) E Bovina (Australia) A Molik	6	6
14	(Japan) S Asagoe (Japan) N Miyagi	3	4
9	(Slovakia) D Hantuchová (United States) C Rubin	6	6
(Argentina) P Tarabini (Netherlands) C Vis	2	4
(Russia) A Jidkova (Japan) A Morigami	6	6^{6}	4
6	(Russia) S Kuznetsova (United States) M Navratilova	3	7^{8}	6

Third round
3	(United States) L Davenport (United States) L Raymond
(Russia) E Bovina (Australia) A Molik	w/o
9	(Slovakia) D Hantuchová (United States) C Rubin	6	3	7
6	(Russia) S Kuznetsova (United States) M Navratilova	4	6	5

Quarterfinals
(Russia) E Bovina (Australia) A Molik	3	1
9	(Slovakia) D Hantuchová (United States) C Rubin	6	6

=== Bottom half ===
==== Section 3 ====
First round
7	(Hungary) P Mandula (Austria) P Wartusch	6	6
(Belarus) T Poutchek (Russia) A Rodionova	0	3
(Canada) S Jeyaseelan (Croatia) J Kostanić	6	6
(Russia) E Kulikovskaya (Ukraine) T Perebiynis	3	4
WC	(France) S Foretz (France) V Razzano	5	2
(Venezuela) M Sequera (Canada) V Webb	7	6
(Japan) R Fujiwara (Russia) D Safina	2	1
12	(France) N Dechy (France) É Loit	6	6
15	(Switzerland) E Gagliardi (Switzerland) P Schnyder	6	6
(United States) A Augustus (United States) J Embry	1	4
(Germany) B Lamade (Germany) M Müller	6	6
(United States) A Harkleroad (United States) M Irvin	1	2
(United States) T Ashley (United States) A Spears	6	2	6
(Czech Republic) R Voráčová (Germany) M Weingärtner	4	6	2
(Australia) N Pratt (Germany) B Rittner	2	2
4	(Zimbabwe) C Black (Russia) E Likhovtseva	6	6

Second round
7	(Hungary) P Mandula (Austria) P Wartusch	6	2	6
(Canada) S Jeyaseelan (Croatia) J Kostanić	4	6	3
(Venezuela) M Sequera (Canada) V Webb	3	4
12	(France) N Dechy (France) É Loit	6	6
15	(Switzerland) E Gagliardi (Switzerland) P Schnyder	7^{7}	7^{7}
(Germany) B Lamade (Germany) M Müller	6^{1}	6^{1}
(United States) T Ashley (United States) A Spears	4	4
4	(Zimbabwe) C Black (Russia) E Likhovtseva	6	6

Third round
7	(Hungary) P Mandula (Austria) P Wartusch	2	2
12	(France) N Dechy (France) É Loit	6	6
15	(Switzerland) E Gagliardi (Switzerland) P Schnyder	1	4
4	(Zimbabwe) C Black (Russia) E Likhovtseva	6	6

Quarterfinals
12	(France) N Dechy (France) É Loit	4	6^{1}
4	(Zimbabwe) C Black (Russia) E Likhovtseva	6	7^{7}

==== Section 4 ====
First round
8	(South Africa) L Huber (Bulgaria) M Maleeva	2	4
(Italy) S Farina Elia (Italy) T Garbin	6	6
(Italy) F Pennetta (Romania) A Vanc	2	3
(Venezuela) M Vento-Kabchi (Indonesia) A Widjaja	6	6
WC	(France) A Dulon (France) A-L Heitz	6	4	4
(United States) N Arendt (Australia) E Dominikovic	3	6	6
(Slovenia) M Matevžič (Slovakia) H Nagyová	6	6
10	(Spain) C Martínez (United States) M Shaughnessy	2	3
16	(Chinese Taipei) J Lee (Indonesia) W Prakusya	5	6^{4}
(Belgium) E Callens (United States) M Tu	7	7^{7}
(Greece) E Daniilidou (Italy) R Grande	6	6
WC	(France) T Golovin (France) A Laurendon	0	3
(United States) C Morariu (Australia) R Stubbs	1	6^{2}
(Russia) E Dementieva (Russia) L Krasnoroutskaya	6	7^{7}
(France) S Cohen-Aloro (France) N Tauziat	1	1
2	(Belgium) K Clijsters (Japan) A Sugiyama	6	6

Second round
(Italy) S Farina Elia (Italy) T Garbin	3	6	6
(Venezuela) M Vento-Kabchi (Indonesia) A Widjaja	6	3	2
(United States) N Arendt (Australia) E Dominikovic	2	6	4
(Slovenia) M Matevžič (Slovakia) H Nagyová	6	3	6
(Belgium) E Callens (United States) M Tu	6	2	2
(Greece) E Daniilidou (Italy) R Grande	4	6	6
(Russia) E Dementieva (Russia) L Krasnoroutskaya	4	4
2	(Belgium) K Clijsters (Japan) A Sugiyama	6	6

Third round
(Italy) S Farina Elia (Italy) T Garbin	4	3
(Slovenia) M Matevžič (Slovakia) H Nagyová	6	6
(Greece) E Daniilidou (Italy) R Grande	2	0
2	(Belgium) K Clijsters (Japan) A Sugiyama	6	6

Quarterfinals
(Slovenia) M Matevžič (Slovakia) H Nagyová	2	5
2	(Belgium) K Clijsters (Japan) A Sugiyama	6	7
