= 2003 French Open – Women's singles =

Women's singles
- 2003 French Open

Final
- Champion: (Belgium) Justine Henin-Hardenne
- Runner-up: (Belgium) Kim Clijsters
- Score: 6–0, 6–4

Details
- Seeds: 32

Events
Singles	men	women		boys	girls
Doubles	men	women	mixed	boys	girls
WC Singles	men	women	quad
WC Doubles	men	women	quad
Legends	−45	45+	women
← 2002 ·	French Open	· 2004 →

Justine Henin-Hardenne defeated Kim Clijsters in the final, 6–0, 6–4 to win the women's singles tennis title at the 2003 French Open. It was her first major singles title, becoming the first Belgian to win a singles major; Clijsters was attempting to achieve the same accolade. The final made Belgium the third country in the Open Era (following Australia and the United States) to have two countrywomen contest a major final.

Serena Williams was the defending champion, but was defeated by Henin-Hardenne in the semifinals, ending her winning streak of 33 major matches and her title streak of four.

This tournament marked the final professional appearance of former world No. 1 and nine-time major champion Monica Seles; she was defeated by Nadia Petrova in the first round. It was Seles' only first-round loss at a major in her career, and the only time she lost before the quarterfinals at the French Open (reaching that stage in her first ten French Opens). It was also the first French Open appearance for future world No. 1 and five-time major champion Maria Sharapova, who was defeated by Magüi Serna in the first round.

== Seeds ==
1. (United States) Serena Williams (semifinals)
2. (Belgium) Kim Clijsters (final)
3. (United States) Venus Williams (fourth round)
4. (Belgium) Justine Henin-Hardenne (champion)
5. (France) Amélie Mauresmo (quarterfinals)
6. (United States) Lindsay Davenport (fourth round)
7. (United States) Jennifer Capriati (fourth round)
8. (United States) Chanda Rubin (quarterfinals)
9. (Slovakia) Daniela Hantuchová (second round)
10. (Serbia and Montenegro) Jelena Dokić (second round)
11. (Russia) Anastasia Myskina (second round)
12. (United States) Monica Seles (first round)
13. (Russia) Elena Dementieva (first round)
14. (Greece) Eleni Daniilidou (third round)
15. (Bulgaria) Magdalena Maleeva (fourth round)
16. (Japan) Ai Sugiyama (fourth round)
17. (South Africa) Amanda Coetzer (first round)
18. (United States) Meghann Shaughnessy (third round)
19. (Switzerland) Patty Schnyder (fourth round)
20. (Russia) Elena Bovina (second round)
21. (United States) Lisa Raymond (second round)
22. (Russia) Vera Zvonareva (quarterfinals)
23. (Israel) Anna Pistolesi (second round)
24. (Spain) Conchita Martínez (quarterfinals)
25. (France) Nathalie Dechy (third round)
26. (Italy) Silvia Farina Elia (third round)
27. (United States) Alexandra Stevenson (first round)
28. (Argentina) Clarisa Fernández (second round)
29. (Russia) Elena Likhovtseva (first round)
30. (Argentina) Paola Suárez (third round)
31. (United States) Laura Granville (third round)
32. (Italy) Francesca Schiavone (second round)

== Draw ==
=== Key ===
- Q = Qualifier
- WC = Wild card
- LL = Lucky loser
- Alt = Alternate
- ITF = ITF entry
- PR = Protected ranking
- SR = Special ranking
- SE = Special exempt
- JE = Junior exempt
- JR = Junior Accelerator Programme entrant
- CO = College Accelerator Programme entrant
- NG = Next Gen Accelerator Program entrant
- w/o = Walkover
- r = Retired
- d = Defaulted

=== Finals ===
Quarterfinals
1	(United States) Serena Williams	6	6
5	(France) Amélie Mauresmo	1	2
4	(Belgium) Justine Henin-Hardenne	6	6
8	(United States) Chanda Rubin	3	2
(Russia) Nadia Petrova	6	4	6
22	(Russia) Vera Zvonareva	1	6	3
24	(Spain) Conchita Martínez	2	1
2	(Belgium) Kim Clijsters	6	6

Semifinals
1	(United States) Serena Williams	2	6	5
4	(Belgium) Justine Henin-Hardenne	6	4	7
(Russia) Nadia Petrova	5	1
2	(Belgium) Kim Clijsters	7	6

Finals
4	(Belgium) Justine Henin-Hardenne	6	6
2	(Belgium) Kim Clijsters	0	4

=== Top half ===
==== Section 1 ====
First round
1	(United States) S Williams	6	6
(Germany) B Rittner	2	1
(Indonesia) A Widjaja	3	6	5
(Switzerland) M-G Mikaelian	6	4	7
(Japan) A Morigami	6	4	0
(Austria) B Schett	4	6	6
(France) M Pierce	2	3
28	(Argentina) C Fernández	6	6
18	(United States) M Shaughnessy	3	7	11
(Russia) S Kuznetsova	6	5	9
(Belgium) E Callens	6^{4}	3
(Slovakia) Ľ Cervanová	7^{7}	6
(United States) S Taylor	3	4
Q	(Czech Republic) S Kleinová	6	6
(Spain) V Ruano Pascual	6	4	4
16	(Japan) A Sugiyama	4	6	6

Second round
1	(United States) S Williams	6	6
(Switzerland) M-G Mikaelian	3	2
(Austria) B Schett	6	5	6
28	(Argentina) C Fernández	4	7	1
18	(United States) M Shaughnessy	6	7^{7}
(Slovakia) Ľ Cervanová	3	6^{5}
Q	(Czech Republic) S Kleinová	5	0
16	(Japan) A Sugiyama	7	6

Third round
1	(United States) S Williams	6	6
(Austria) B Schett	0	0
18	(United States) M Shaughnessy	1	4
16	(Japan) A Sugiyama	6	6

Fourth round
1	(United States) S Williams	7	6
16	(Japan) A Sugiyama	5	3

==== Section 2 ====
First round
9	(Slovakia) D Hantuchová	2	6	6
(Russia) A Jidkova	6	0	1
(United States) A Harkleroad	6	6
(Japan) S Obata	4	2
Q	(Russia) M Sharapova	3	3
(Spain) M Serna	6	6
WC	(France) C Pin	1	1
23	(Israel) A Pistolesi	6	6
29	(Russia) E Likhovtseva	3	2
(France) É Loit	6	6
(Thailand) T Tanasugarn	0	2
(Colombia) F Zuluaga	6	6
(Russia) L Krasnoroutskaya	6	6
(United States) J Craybas	1	3
(France) V Razzano	3	5
5	(France) A Mauresmo	6	7

Second round
9	(Slovakia) D Hantuchová	6^{2}	6	7
(United States) A Harkleroad	7^{7}	4	9
(Spain) M Serna	6	3	6
23	(Israel) A Pistolesi	4	6	3
(France) É Loit	6^{6}	6	7
(Colombia) F Zuluaga	7^{8}	1	9
(Russia) L Krasnoroutskaya	1	2
5	(France) A Mauresmo	6	6

Third round
(United States) A Harkleroad	6	1	2
(Spain) M Serna	3	6	6
(Colombia) F Zuluaga	3	4
5	(France) A Mauresmo	6	6

Fourth round
(Spain) M Serna	1	2
5	(France) A Mauresmo	6	6

==== Section 3 ====
First round
4	(Belgium) J Henin-Hardenne	6	7
(Austria) P Wartusch	3	5
(Croatia) J Kostanić	7	6^{5}	6
WC	(France) S Lefèvre	5	7^{7}	4
(France) S Foretz	6	7
Q	(Czech Republic) E Birnerová	4	5
(Madagascar) D Randriantefy	6	6
27	(United States) A Stevenson	3	3
19	(Switzerland) P Schnyder	6	6
WC	(France) V Pichet	1	0
Q	(Argentina) N Gussoni	1	5
(France) S Cohen-Aloro	6	7
WC	(Australia) C Wheeler	4	3
(Italy) T Garbin	6	6
(Australia) N Pratt	4	3
14	(Greece) E Daniilidou	6	6

Second round
4	(Belgium) J Henin-Hardenne	6	6
(Croatia) J Kostanić	2	2
(France) S Foretz	2	1
(Madagascar) D Randriantefy	6	6
19	(Switzerland) P Schnyder	6	7^{7}
(France) S Cohen-Aloro	3	6^{4}
(Italy) T Garbin	0	6	2
14	(Greece) E Daniilidou	6	4	6

Third round
4	(Belgium) J Henin-Hardenne	6	6
(Madagascar) D Randriantefy	1	1
19	(Switzerland) P Schnyder	6	6
14	(Greece) E Daniilidou	3	4

Fourth round
4	(Belgium) J Henin-Hardenne	6	2	6
19	(Switzerland) P Schnyder	3	6	2

==== Section 4 ====
First round
11	(Russia) A Myskina	6	6
(Russia) D Safina	2	2
(Hungary) P Mandula	6	6
(Spain) M Marrero	2	3
(Italy) F Pennetta	6	6
WC	(France) A Dulon	4	4
(Japan) S Asagoe	1	5
21	(United States) L Raymond	6	7
31	(United States) L Granville	1	6	6
(United States) M Tu	6	1	4
(South Korea) Y-j Cho	6	5	0
(Croatia) I Majoli	4	7	6
(Switzerland) M Casanova	4	6	4
(Zimbabwe) C Black	6	4	6
(Slovakia) H Nagyová	2	4
8	(United States) C Rubin	6	6

Second round
11	(Russia) A Myskina	3	4
(Hungary) P Mandula	6	6
(Italy) F Pennetta	6	7^{7}
21	(United States) L Raymond	3	6^{3}
31	(United States) L Granville	6	6
(Croatia) I Majoli	1	2
(Zimbabwe) C Black	6^{6}	3
8	(United States) C Rubin	7^{8}	6

Third round
(Hungary) P Mandula	6	6
(Italy) F Pennetta	2	4
31	(United States) L Granville	6	1	3
8	(United States) C Rubin	2	6	6

Fourth round
(Hungary) P Mandula	6	2	5
8	(United States) C Rubin	4	6	7

=== Bottom half ===
==== Section 5 ====
First round
7	(United States) J Capriati	6	6
PR	(South Africa) J Kruger	2	1
(Paraguay) R Neffa-de los Ríos	3	0
(France) M Bartoli	6	6
Q	(Ukraine) J Vakulenko	6	6
(Spain) C Torrens Valero	1	1
Q	(Germany) J Schruff	6	3	2
32	(Italy) F Schiavone	3	6	6
17	(South Africa) A Coetzer	2	6	3
(Slovenia) K Srebotnik	6	4	6
(United States) M Irvin	7^{7}	2	6
LL	(Italy) ME Camerin	6^{4}	6	4
(Croatia) S Talaja	6	6
(Slovakia) J Husárová	2	4
(Russia) N Petrova	6	6
12	(United States) M Seles	4	0

Second round
7	(United States) J Capriati	6	6
(France) M Bartoli	3	0
Q	(Ukraine) J Vakulenko	6	6
32	(Italy) F Schiavone	3	4
(Slovenia) K Srebotnik	4	5
(United States) M Irvin	6	7
(Croatia) S Talaja	1	1
(Russia) N Petrova	6	6

Third round
7	(United States) J Capriati	6	6
Q	(Ukraine) J Vakulenko	1	2
(United States) M Irvin	1	1
(Russia) N Petrova	6	6

Fourth round
7	(United States) J Capriati	3	6	3
(Russia) N Petrova	6	4	6

==== Section 6 ====
First round
13	(Russia) E Dementieva	3	3
(Spain) M Sánchez Lorenzo	6	6
(Germany) A Barna	7	5	5
(Slovenia) M Matevžič	5	7	7
(Czech Republic) D Chládková	6	6
WC	(France) A Laurendon	0	1
(Germany) M Müller	1	3
22	(Russia) V Zvonareva	6	6
26	(Italy) S Farina Elia	6	6
(Spain) C Martínez Granados	0	4
Q	(Morocco) B Mouhtassine	1	2
(Czech Republic) Z Ondrášková	6	6
(Czech Republic) I Benešová	0	1
(Australia) E Dominikovic	6	6
LL	(United States) S Reeves	2	4
3	(United States) V Williams	6	6

Second round
(Spain) M Sánchez Lorenzo	6	5	6
(Slovenia) M Matevžič	2	7	3
(Czech Republic) D Chládková	2	3
22	(Russia) V Zvonareva	6	6
26	(Italy) S Farina Elia	6	6
(Czech Republic) Z Ondrášková	1	2
(Australia) E Dominikovic	3	6	2
3	(United States) V Williams	6	4	6

Third round
(Spain) M Sánchez Lorenzo	3	4
22	(Russia) V Zvonareva	6	6
26	(Italy) S Farina Elia	1	2
3	(United States) V Williams	6	6

Fourth round
22	(Russia) V Zvonareva	2	6	6
3	(United States) V Williams	6	2	4

==== Section 7 ====
First round
6	(United States) L Davenport	6	6
Q	(Indonesia) W Prakusya	2	0
(Uzbekistan) I Tulyaganova	6	7
(Italy) A Serra Zanetti	2	5
Q	(Spain) G León García	6	4	7
Q	(Argentina) G Dulko	4	6	5
(Czech Republic) L Průšová	3	1
25	(France) N Dechy	6	6
24	(Spain) C Martínez	6	6
Q	(Ukraine) T Perebiynis	2	3
(Belarus) T Poutchek	1	7^{7}	3
(Switzerland) E Gagliardi	6	6^{2}	6
(Czech Republic) K Koukalová	6^{3}	1
(Slovenia) T Pisnik	7^{7}	6
(Germany) A Rösch	4	4
10	(Serbia and Montenegro) J Dokić	6	6

Second round
6	(United States) L Davenport	7	6
(Uzbekistan) I Tulyaganova	5	1
Q	(Spain) G León García	3	4
25	(France) N Dechy	6	6
24	(Spain) C Martínez	7	6
(Switzerland) E Gagliardi	5	2
(Slovenia) T Pisnik	4	6	6
10	(Serbia and Montenegro) J Dokić	6	3	2

Third round
6	(United States) L Davenport	6	7
25	(France) N Dechy	3	5
24	(Spain) C Martínez	6	6
(Slovenia) T Pisnik	3	3

Fourth round
6	(United States) L Davenport	4	0^{r}
24	(Spain) C Martínez	6	2

==== Section 8 ====
First round
15	(Bulgaria) M Maleeva	6	3	6
(Australia) A Molik	3	6	1
(Russia) E Kulikovskaya	6	6
WC	(France) C Beigbeder	4	2
(United States) A Cargill	3	1
(Italy) R Grande	6	6
WC	(France) T Golovin	4	1
20	(Russia) E Bovina	6	6
30	(Argentina) P Suárez	6	6
Q	(Romania) E Gallovits	1	0
(Czech Republic) D Bedáňová	6	5	3
PR	(United States) C Morariu	4	7	6
(Germany) M Weingärtner	6	7
(United States) L Lee-Waters	2	5
(United States) A Frazier	2	0
2	(Belgium) K Clijsters	6	6

Second round
15	(Bulgaria) M Maleeva	6	6
(Russia) E Kulikovskaya	3	2
(Italy) R Grande	7	6
20	(Russia) E Bovina	5	3
30	(Argentina) P Suárez	6	6
PR	(United States) C Morariu	1	1
(Germany) M Weingärtner	2	2
2	(Belgium) K Clijsters	6	6

Third round
15	(Bulgaria) M Maleeva	6	2	6
(Italy) R Grande	3	6	3
30	(Argentina) P Suárez	2	1
2	(Belgium) K Clijsters	6	6

Fourth round
15	(Bulgaria) M Maleeva	6	2	1
2	(Belgium) K Clijsters	0	6	6

Preceded by 2003 Australian Open – Women's singles	Grand Slam women's singles	Succeeded by 2003 Wimbledon Championships – Women's singles
