= 2003 French Open – Men's doubles =

Men's doubles
- 2003 French Open

Final
- Champion: (United States) Bob Bryan (United States) Mike Bryan
- Runner-up: (Netherlands) Paul Haarhuis (Russia) Yevgeny Kafelnikov
- Score: 7–6^{(7–3)}, 6–3

Details
- Draw: 64
- Seeds: 16

Events
Singles	men	women		boys	girls
Doubles	men	women	mixed	boys	girls
WC Singles	men	women	quad
WC Doubles	men	women	quad
Legends	−45	45+	women
← 2002 ·	French Open	· 2004 →

Bob and Mike Bryan defeated defending champions Paul Haarhuis and Yevgeny Kafelnikov in the final, 7–6^{(7–3)}, 6–3 to win the men's doubles tennis title at the 2003 French Open. It was the Bryan brothers' first career major title, and the first of an eventual record 16 majors won as a team. The pair did not lose a set during the tournament.

== Seeds ==
1. (The Bahamas) Mark Knowles / (Canada) Daniel Nestor (third round)
2. (India) Mahesh Bhupathi / (Belarus) Max Mirnyi (quarterfinals)
3. (United States) Bob Bryan / (United States) Mike Bryan (champions)
4. (Australia) Todd Woodbridge / (Sweden) Jonas Björkman (second round)
5. (India) Leander Paes / (Czech Republic) David Rikl (semifinals)
6. (France) Michaël Llodra / (France) Fabrice Santoro (third round)
7. (Czech Republic) Martin Damm / (Czech Republic) Cyril Suk (second round)
8. (Zimbabwe) Wayne Black / (Zimbabwe) Kevin Ullyett (second round)
9. (Australia) Joshua Eagle / (United States) Jared Palmer (third round)
10. (Australia) Wayne Arthurs / (Australia) Paul Hanley (semifinals)
11. (Netherlands) Paul Haarhuis / (Russia) Yevgeny Kafelnikov (final)
12. (South Africa) Chris Haggard / (South Africa) Robbie Koenig (second round)
13. (Czech Republic) Tomáš Cibulec / (Czech Republic) Pavel Vízner (third round)
14. (Czech Republic) František Čermák / (Czech Republic) Leoš Friedl (third round)
15. (United States) Donald Johnson / (Serbia and Montenegro) Nenad Zimonjić (second round)
16. (Argentina) Gastón Etlis / (Argentina) Martín Rodríguez (quarterfinals)

== Draw ==
=== Key ===
- Q = Qualifier
- WC = Wild card
- LL = Lucky loser
- Alt = Alternate
- ITF = ITF entry
- PR = Protected ranking
- SR = Special ranking
- SE = Special exempt
- JE = Junior exempt
- JR = Junior Accelerator Programme entrant
- CO = College Accelerator Programme entrant
- NG = Next Gen Accelerator Program entrant
- w/o = Walkover
- r = Retired
- d = Defaulted

=== Finals ===
Quarterfinals
16	(Argentina) Gastón Etlis (Argentina) Martín Rodríguez	6	4	1
11	(Netherlands) Paul Haarhuis (Russia) Yevgeny Kafelnikov	2	6	6
(Argentina) Lucas Arnold Ker (Argentina) Mariano Hood	6	6^{4}	7
10	(Australia) Wayne Arthurs (Australia) Paul Hanley	4	7^{7}	9
(Italy) Massimo Bertolini (Argentina) Sebastián Prieto	1	4
3	(United States) Bob Bryan (United States) Mike Bryan	6	6
5	(India) Leander Paes (Czech Republic) David Rikl	3	7	6
2	(India) Mahesh Bhupathi (Belarus) Max Mirnyi	6	5	3

Semifinals
11	(Netherlands) Paul Haarhuis (Russia) Yevgeny Kafelnikov	6	6
10	(Australia) Wayne Arthurs (Australia) Paul Hanley	4	4
3	(United States) Bob Bryan (United States) Mike Bryan	6	6
5	(India) Leander Paes (Czech Republic) David Rikl	4	3

Final
11	(Netherlands) Paul Haarhuis (Russia) Yevgeny Kafelnikov	6^{3}	3
3	(United States) Bob Bryan (United States) Mike Bryan	7^{7}	6

=== Top half ===
==== Section 1 ====
First round
1	(The Bahamas) M Knowles (Canada) D Nestor	6	6
(Italy) E Artoni (Argentina) M Zabaleta	0	1
(South Korea) H-t Lee (Belarus) V Voltchkov	7^{7}	6
WC	(France) S de Chaunac (France) O Mutis	6^{1}	2
(Germany) N Kiefer (Belgium) O Rochus	1	1^{r}
(Sweden) J Landsberg (Finland) J Nieminen	6	2
WC	(France) É Roger-Vasselin (France) J-W Tsonga	2	5
16	(Argentina) G Etlis (Argentina) M Rodríguez	6	7
11	(Netherlands) P Haarhuis (Russia) Y Kafelnikov	0
(Spain) D Ferrer (Spain) A Martín	1^{r}
(Belgium) X Malisse (Belgium) K Vliegen	6	3	6
(Czech Republic) O Fukárek (United States) J Thomas	4	6	3
(Argentina) J Acasuso (Argentina) A Schneiter	3	3
(Netherlands) R Sluiter (Netherlands) M Verkerk	6	6
(Argentina) M García (Argentina) D Nalbandian	4	0^{r}
6	(France) M Llodra (France) F Santoro	6	3

Second round
1	(The Bahamas) M Knowles (Canada) D Nestor	6	6
(South Korea) H-t Lee (Belarus) V Voltchkov	3	3
(Sweden) J Landsberg (Finland) J Nieminen	4	4
16	(Argentina) G Etlis (Argentina) M Rodríguez	6	6
11	(Netherlands) P Haarhuis (Russia) Y Kafelnikov	7^{7}	6
(Belgium) X Malisse (Belgium) K Vliegen	6^{4}	4
(Netherlands) R Sluiter (Netherlands) M Verkerk	2	3
6	(France) M Llodra (France) F Santoro	6	6

Third round
1	(The Bahamas) M Knowles (Canada) D Nestor	6	3	3
16	(Argentina) G Etlis (Argentina) M Rodríguez	1	6	6
11	(Netherlands) P Haarhuis (Russia) Y Kafelnikov	7^{7}	6^{9}	6
6	(France) M Llodra (France) F Santoro	6^{2}	7^{11}	4

Quarterfinals
16	(Argentina) G Etlis (Argentina) M Rodríguez	6	4	1
11	(Netherlands) P Haarhuis (Russia) Y Kafelnikov	2	6	6

==== Section 2 ====
First round
4	(Sweden) J Björkman (Australia) T Woodbridge	6	6
(Slovakia) D Hrbatý (Brazil) A Sá	4	2
(Argentina) L Arnold Ker (Argentina) M Hood	2	7	6
WC	(France) J-F Bachelot (France) G Carraz	6	5	4
(Germany) M Kohlmann (Austria) J Knowle	3
(Brazil) F Saretta (Spain) F Vicente	1^{r}
(United States) S Humphries (The Bahamas) M Merklein	6	3	4
13	(Czech Republic) T Cibulec (Czech Republic) P Vízner	2	6	6
10	(Australia) W Arthurs (Australia) P Hanley	7	6
(Czech Republic) P Luxa (Czech Republic) R Štěpánek	5	4
(Russia) A Olhovskiy (Armenia) S Sargsian	5	6	7
(Switzerland) Y Allegro (United States) T Dent	7	4	5
(Morocco) Y El Aynaoui (Belgium) T Vanhoudt	5
(Argentina) G Gaudio (Argentina) L Lobo	2^{r}
WC	(France) R Cadart (France) R Gasquet	1	1
8	(Zimbabwe) W Black (Zimbabwe) K Ullyett	6	6

Second round
4	(Sweden) J Björkman (Australia) T Woodbridge	1	3
(Argentina) L Arnold Ker (Argentina) M Hood	6	6
(Germany) M Kohlmann (Austria) J Knowle	2	0
13	(Czech Republic) T Cibulec (Czech Republic) P Vízner	6	6
10	(Australia) W Arthurs (Australia) P Hanley	4	6	6
(Russia) A Olhovskiy (Armenia) S Sargsian	6	1	2
(Morocco) Y El Aynaoui (Belgium) T Vanhoudt	6	6
8	(Zimbabwe) W Black (Zimbabwe) K Ullyett	3	4

Third round
(Argentina) L Arnold Ker (Argentina) M Hood	1	6	6
13	(Czech Republic) T Cibulec (Czech Republic) P Vízner	6	3	4
10	(Australia) W Arthurs (Australia) P Hanley	4	7	6
(Morocco) Y El Aynaoui (Belgium) T Vanhoudt	6	5	3

Quarterfinals
(Argentina) L Arnold Ker (Argentina) M Hood	6	6^{4}	7
10	(Australia) W Arthurs (Australia) P Hanley	4	7^{7}	9

=== Bottom half ===
==== Section 3 ====
First round
7	(Czech Republic) M Damm (Czech Republic) C Suk	6	7^{7}
(Spain) A Costa (Spain) Á López Morón	2	6^{3}
(Italy) M Bertolini (Argentina) S Prieto	6	6
(Czech Republic) P Pála (Germany) D Prinosil	3	1
(United States) J-M Gambill (United States) G Oliver	5	4
(Spain) F López (Italy) D Sanguinetti	7	6
(Sweden) S Aspelin (Czech Republic) D Škoch	3	4
12	(South Africa) C Haggard (South Africa) R Koenig	6	6
15	(United States) D Johnson (Serbia and Montenegro) N Zimonjić	6	6
WC	(France) J Golmard (France) C Saulnier	4	4
(France) A Clément (France) N Escudé	6	6
(Australia) N Healey (Australia) J Kerr	2	4
(Australia) A Kratzmann (United States) J Tarango	4	2
WC	(France) J Benneteau (France) N Mahut	6	6
(Spain) A Portas (Spain) T Robredo	3	4
3	(United States) B Bryan (United States) M Bryan	6	6

Second round
7	(Czech Republic) M Damm (Czech Republic) C Suk	6^{7}	6^{7}
(Italy) M Bertolini (Argentina) S Prieto	7^{9}	7^{9}
(Spain) F López (Italy) D Sanguinetti	5	7^{7}	6
12	(South Africa) C Haggard (South Africa) R Koenig	7	6^{3}	1
15	(United States) D Johnson (Serbia and Montenegro) N Zimonjić	3	2
(France) A Clément (France) N Escudé	6	6
WC	(France) J Benneteau (France) N Mahut	2	3
3	(United States) B Bryan (United States) M Bryan	6	6

Third round
(Italy) M Bertolini (Argentina) S Prieto	2	6	6
(Spain) F López (Italy) D Sanguinetti	6	4	4
(France) A Clément (France) N Escudé	1	2
3	(United States) B Bryan (United States) M Bryan	6	6

Quarterfinals
(Italy) M Bertolini (Argentina) S Prieto	1	4
3	(United States) B Bryan (United States) M Bryan	6	6

==== Section 4 ====
First round
5	(India) L Paes (Czech Republic) D Rikl	6	6
(United States) D Adams (United States) J Gimelstob	3	2
(Pakistan) A-u-H Qureshi (Czech Republic) D Vacek	3	3
(United States) R Leach (United States) B MacPhie	6	6
(Argentina) JI Chela (Argentina) S Roitman	6	1
(Netherlands) S Schalken (Netherlands) J van Lottum	1	1^{r}
ALT	(Australia) S Huss (United States) B Vahaly	3	3
9	(Australia) J Eagle (United States) J Palmer	6	6
14	(Czech Republic) F Čermák (Czech Republic) L Friedl	6	6
(France) A Dupuis (France) P-H Mathieu	3	2
ALT	(Argentina) F Browne (Peru) L Horna	3	1
(United States) D Bowen (Australia) A Fisher	6	6
(Slovakia) K Beck (Slovakia) K Kučera	2	6	4
(France) T Ascione (France) J Varlet	6	4	6
(Japan) T Shimada (South Africa) M Wakefield	5	3
2	(India) M Bhupathi (Belarus) M Mirnyi	7	6

Second round
5	(India) L Paes (Czech Republic) D Rikl	3	6	6
(United States) R Leach (United States) B MacPhie	6	2	1
(Argentina) JI Chela (Argentina) S Roitman	3	2
9	(Australia) J Eagle (United States) J Palmer	6	6
14	(Czech Republic) F Čermák (Czech Republic) L Friedl	6	6
(United States) D Bowen (Australia) A Fisher	4	4
(France) T Ascione (France) J Varlet	3	4
2	(India) M Bhupathi (Belarus) M Mirnyi	6	6

Third round
5	(India) L Paes (Czech Republic) D Rikl	6	6
9	(Australia) J Eagle (United States) J Palmer	2	0
14	(Czech Republic) F Čermák (Czech Republic) L Friedl	3	2
2	(India) M Bhupathi (Belarus) M Mirnyi	6	6

Quarterfinals
5	(India) L Paes (Czech Republic) D Rikl	3	7	6
2	(India) M Bhupathi (Belarus) M Mirnyi	6	5	3
