= 2003 Wimbledon Championships – Mixed doubles =

Mixed doubles
- 2003 Wimbledon Championships

Final
- Champions: (India) Leander Paes (United States) Martina Navratilova
- Runners-up: (Israel) Andy Ram (Russia) Anastasia Rodionova
- Score: 6–3, 6–3

Details
- Draw: 64 (4 WC )
- Seeds: 16

Events
Singles	men	women		boys	girls
Doubles	men	women	mixed	boys	girls
WC Singles	men	women	quad
WC Doubles	men	women	quad
Legends	men	women	seniors
← 2002 ·	Wimbledon Championships	· 2004 →

Mahesh Bhupathi and Elena Likhovtseva were the defending champions but decided not to play together. Bhupathi played with Paola Suárez and lost in third round to Nenad Zimonjić and Iroda Tulyaganova, while Likhovtseva competed with Bob Bryan and lost in second round to Andy Ram and Anastasia Rodionova.

Leander Paes and Martina Navratilova defeated Ram and Rodionova in the final, 6–3, 6–3 to win the mixed doubles tennis title at the 2003 Wimbledon Championships. It was the 2nd Wimbledon and 3rd mixed doubles title for Paes, and the 4th Wimbledon and 9th mixed doubles title for Navratilova, in their respective careers.

== Seeds ==
1. (India) Mahesh Bhupathi / (Argentina) Paola Suárez (third round)
2. (United States) Mike Bryan / (United States) Lisa Raymond (quarterfinals)
3. (United States) Bob Bryan / (Russia) Elena Likhovtseva (second round)
4. (Australia) Todd Woodbridge / (Russia) Svetlana Kuznetsova (quarterfinals)
5. (India) Leander Paes / (United States) Martina Navratilova (champions)
6. (Zimbabwe) Wayne Black / (Zimbabwe) Cara Black (third round)
7. (Zimbabwe) Kevin Ullyett / (Slovakia) Daniela Hantuchová (third round)
8. (United States) Donald Johnson / (Australia) Rennae Stubbs (first round)
9. (South Africa) Chris Haggard / (Switzerland) Emmanuelle Gagliardi (first round)
10. (Czech Republic) Leoš Friedl / (South Africa) Liezel Huber (semifinals)
11. (Czech Republic) Cyril Suk / (Slovenia) Maja Matevžič (second round, withdrew)
12. (Australia) Joshua Eagle / (Austria) Barbara Schett (second round)
13. (Czech Republic) Petr Pála / (Slovakia) Janette Husárová (second round)
14. (United States) Graydon Oliver / (Hungary) Petra Mandula (first round)
15. (Czech Republic) Pavel Vízner / (Australia) Nicole Pratt (third round)
16. (Argentina) Mariano Hood / (Slovenia) Tina Križan (second round, withdrew)

Click on the seed number of a player to go to their draw section.

== Draw ==
=== Key ===
- Q = Qualifier
- WC = Wild card
- LL = Lucky loser
- Alt = Alternate
- SE = Special exempt
- PR = Protected ranking
- ITF = ITF entry
- JE = Junior exempt
- w/o = Walkover
- r = Retired
- d = Defaulted
- SR = Special ranking

=== Finals ===
Quarterfinals
(Serbia and Montenegro) Nenad Zimonjić (Uzbekistan) Iroda Tulyaganova	7	6^{2}	6
(Australia) Jordan Kerr (Venezuela) Milagros Sequera	5	7^{7}	8
(Israel) Andy Ram (Russia) Anastasia Rodionova	7^{7}	3	6
(United States) Scott Humphries (Russia) Elena Bovina	6^{5}	6	3
10	(Czech Republic) Leoš Friedl (South Africa) Liezel Huber	6	7
4	(Australia) Todd Woodbridge (Russia) Svetlana Kuznetsova	4	5
5	(India) Leander Paes (United States) Martina Navratilova	5	7^{7}	6
2	(United States) Mike Bryan (United States) Lisa Raymond	7	6^{3}	4

Semifinals
(Australia) Jordan Kerr (Venezuela) Milagros Sequera	2	3
(Israel) Andy Ram (Russia) Anastasia Rodionova	6	6
10	(Czech Republic) Leoš Friedl (South Africa) Liezel Huber	5	4
5	(India) Leander Paes (United States) Martina Navratilova	7	6

Final
(Israel) Andy Ram (Russia) Anastasia Rodionova	3	3
5	(India) Leander Paes (United States) Martina Navratilova	6	6

=== Top half ===
==== Section 1 ====
First round
1	(India) M Bhupathi (Argentina) P Suárez	6	6
WC	(United Kingdom) A Parmar (United Kingdom) A Keothavong	2	1
(United States) J Thomas (Chinese Taipei) J Lee	4	3
(United States) J Palmer (United States) A Spears	6	6
(The Bahamas) M Merklein (Australia) L McShea	4	2
(Serbia and Montenegro) N Zimonjić (Uzbekistan) I Tulyaganova	6	6
(United Kingdom) J Marray (United Kingdom) J Pullin	2	6^{5}
16	(Argentina) M Hood (Slovenia) T Križan	6	7^{7}
9	(South Africa) C Haggard (Switzerland) E Gagliardi	7	2	4
(Australia) J Kerr (Venezuela) M Sequera	5	6	6
(South Africa) D Adams (Indonesia) W Prakusya	3	4
(United States) D Bowen (South Africa) N de Villiers	6	6
(Argentina) JI Chela (Latvia) L Dekmeijere	4	1
(Israel) J Erlich (United States) J Embry	6	6
(Argentina) L Arnold Ker (Argentina) P Tarabini	3^{r}
7	(Zimbabwe) K Ullyett (Slovakia) D Hantuchová	5

Second round
1	(India) M Bhupathi (Argentina) P Suárez	6	6^{2}	6
(United States) J Palmer (United States) A Spears	4	7^{7}	1
(Serbia and Montenegro) N Zimonjić (Uzbekistan) I Tulyaganova
16	(Argentina) M Hood (Slovenia) T Križan	w/o
(Australia) J Kerr (Venezuela) M Sequera	6	6
(United States) D Bowen (South Africa) N de Villiers	2	3
(Israel) J Erlich (United States) J Embry	4	2
7	(Zimbabwe) K Ullyett (Slovakia) D Hantuchová	6	6

Third round
1	(India) M Bhupathi (Argentina) P Suárez	3	4
(Serbia and Montenegro) N Zimonjić (Uzbekistan) I Tulyaganova	6	6
(Australia) J Kerr (Venezuela) M Sequera	6	6
7	(Zimbabwe) K Ullyett (Slovakia) D Hantuchová	2	4

Quarterfinals
(Serbia and Montenegro) N Zimonjić (Uzbekistan) I Tulyaganova	7	6^{2}	6
(Australia) J Kerr (Venezuela) M Sequera	5	7^{7}	8

==== Section 2 ====
First round
3	(United States) B Bryan (Russia) E Likhovtseva	6	6
WC	(United Kingdom) O Freelove (United Kingdom) H Crook	3	2
(Israel) A Ram (Russia) A Rodionova	6	6
WC	(United Kingdom) D Sherwood (United Kingdom) L Ahl	2	2
(Czech Republic) D Vacek (Belarus) T Poutchek	4	6^{2}
(Australia) S Huss (Japan) N Miyagi	6	7^{7}
(Russia) A Olhovskiy (Russia) E Kulikovskaya	4	3
13	(Czech Republic) P Pála (Slovakia) J Husárová	6	6
11	(Czech Republic) C Suk (Slovenia) M Matevžič	6	6
WC	(United Kingdom) M Maclagan (United Kingdom) A Janes	3	4
(Australia) A Ross (United States) A Augustus	0	3
(United States) S Humphries (Russia) E Bovina	6	6
(United Kingdom) L Childs (United Kingdom) E Baltacha	4	4
(Canada) D Nestor (Canada) S Jeyaseelan	6	6
(Argentina) A Schneiter (Venezuela) M Vento-Kabchi	4	2
6	(Zimbabwe) W Black (Zimbabwe) C Black	6	6

Second round
3	(United States) B Bryan (Russia) E Likhovtseva	5	7^{7}	4
(Israel) A Ram (Russia) A Rodionova	7	6^{4}	6
(Australia) S Huss (Japan) N Miyagi	6	6
13	(Czech Republic) P Pála (Slovakia) J Husárová	3	2
11	(Czech Republic) C Suk (Slovenia) M Matevžič	w/o
(United States) S Humphries (Russia) E Bovina
(Canada) D Nestor (Canada) S Jeyaseelan	4	1
6	(Zimbabwe) W Black (Zimbabwe) C Black	6	6

Third round
(Israel) A Ram (Russia) A Rodionova	2	6	6
(Australia) S Huss (Japan) N Miyagi	6	4	4
(United States) S Humphries (Russia) E Bovina	7	7^{7}
6	(Zimbabwe) W Black (Zimbabwe) C Black	5	6^{5}

Quarterfinals
(Israel) A Ram (Russia) A Rodionova	7^{7}	3	6
(United States) S Humphries (Russia) E Bovina	6^{5}	6	3

=== Bottom half ===
==== Section 3 ====
First round
8	(United States) D Johnson (Australia) R Stubbs	6^{6}	5
(Australia) P Hanley (Australia) A Molik	7^{8}	7
(United Kingdom) J Auckland (United Kingdom) S Borwell	2	2
(South Africa) J-L de Jager (Ukraine) E Tatarkova	6	6
(Czech Republic) M Damm (Germany) B Rittner	2	7	6
(Sweden) J Landsberg (Croatia) J Kostanić	6	5	4
(United Kingdom) M Lee (United Kingdom) J O'Donoghue	4	3
10	(Czech Republic) L Friedl (South Africa) L Huber	6	6
14	(United States) G Oliver (Hungary) P Mandula	6^{11}	5
(South Africa) R Koenig (Belgium) E Callens	7^{13}	7
(Australia) J Crabb (Australia) B Stewart	5	7^{7}	5
(Australia) A Kratzmann (Australia) T Musgrave	7	6^{4}	7
(South Africa) M Wakefield (South Africa) N Grandin	6	5	3
(Argentina) M Rodríguez (United States) S Reeves	3	7	6
(United States) B MacPhie (United States) A Harkleroad	3	6	4
4	(Australia) T Woodbridge (Russia) S Kuznetsova	6	4	6

Second round
(Australia) P Hanley (Australia) A Molik	7	6
(South Africa) J-L de Jager (Ukraine) E Tatarkova	5	4
(Czech Republic) M Damm (Germany) B Rittner	6^{15}	0
10	(Czech Republic) L Friedl (South Africa) L Huber	7^{17}	6
(South Africa) R Koenig (Belgium) E Callens	6	6
(Australia) A Kratzmann (Australia) T Musgrave	3	4
(Argentina) M Rodríguez (United States) S Reeves	3	1
4	(Australia) T Woodbridge (Russia) S Kuznetsova	6	6

Third round
(Australia) P Hanley (Australia) A Molik	w/o
10	(Czech Republic) L Friedl (South Africa) L Huber
(South Africa) R Koenig (Belgium) E Callens	5	3
4	(Australia) T Woodbridge (Russia) S Kuznetsova	7	6

Quarterfinals
10	(Czech Republic) L Friedl (South Africa) L Huber	6	7
4	(Australia) T Woodbridge (Russia) S Kuznetsova	4	5

==== Section 4 ====
First round
5	(India) L Paes (United States) M Navratilova	6	6
(United Kingdom) J Delgado (Russia) A Myskina	4	4
(Spain) Á López Morón (Paraguay) R Neffa-de los Ríos	6	6
(Sweden) S Aspelin (France) C Dhenin	2	3
(Italy) M Bertolini (Italy) T Garbin	3	6^{3}
(Australia) P Luczak (Australia) C Wheeler	6	7^{7}
(Japan) T Shimada (Japan) S Asagoe	7^{7}	4	5
12	(Australia) J Eagle (Austria) B Schett	6^{5}	6	7
15	(Czech Republic) P Vízner (Australia) N Pratt	6	6
(Croatia) L Zovko (Canada) V Webb	2	2
(United States) R Leach (Australia) R McQuillan	6	4	4
(United States) J Tarango (Russia) L Krasnoroutskaya	2	6	6
(Australia) A Fisher (Australia) C Barclay	6^{4}	6	5
(Argentina) G Etlis (Netherlands) C Vis	7^{7}	3	7
(Belgium) T Vanhoudt (Netherlands) K Boogert	3	6^{4}
2	(United States) M Bryan (United States) L Raymond	6	7^{7}

Second round
5	(India) L Paes (United States) M Navratilova	6	6
(Spain) Á López Morón (Paraguay) R Neffa-de los Ríos	0	1
(Australia) P Luczak (Australia) C Wheeler	6	4	9
12	(Australia) J Eagle (Austria) B Schett	4	6	7
15	(Czech Republic) P Vízner (Australia) N Pratt	6	6
(United States) J Tarango (Russia) L Krasnoroutskaya	2	4
(Argentina) G Etlis (Netherlands) C Vis	5	5
2	(United States) M Bryan (United States) L Raymond	7	7

Third round
5	(India) L Paes (United States) M Navratilova	6	6
(Australia) P Luczak (Australia) C Wheeler	4	2
15	(Czech Republic) P Vízner (Australia) N Pratt	5	5
2	(United States) M Bryan (United States) L Raymond	7	7

Quarterfinals
5	(India) L Paes (United States) M Navratilova	5	7^{7}	6
2	(United States) M Bryan (United States) L Raymond	7	6^{3}	4
