= Kateřina Böhmová (tennis player, born 1986) =

Czech tennis player

- Country (sports): Czech Republic
- Residence: Prague, Czech Republic
- Born: 18 November 1986 (age 38); Ostrava, Czechoslovakia
- Height: 1.78 m (5 ft 10 in)
- Turned pro: 2005
- Retired: 2012
- Plays: Left (two-handed backhand)
- Prize money: US$ 147,620

Singles
- Career record: 130–110
- Career titles: 3 ITF
- Highest ranking: No. 107 (12 June 2006)

Grand Slam singles results
- Australian Open: Q3 (2006)
- French Open: Q1 (2005)
- Wimbledon: 1R (2005)
- US Open: Q1 (2004, 2005)

Doubles
- Career record: 20–25
- Highest ranking: No. 214 (24 July 2006)

Kateřina Böhmová (born 18 November 1986) is a Czech former professional tennis player. She is the daughter of Kateřina Böhmová-Skronská, Czechoslovak tennis player active in the 1980s. Through marriage she is also known as Kateřina Klapková.

Her career-high singles ranking is world No 107, which she achieved on 12 June 2006. Her biggest career highlight is winning the girls' doubles title at the 2004 French Open, partnering Michaëlla Krajicek.

== Biography ==
Böhmová has won three ITF Women's Circuit titles in her career, including the Barcelona Ladies Open in 2005; and has played on many WTA Tour events. She has made one Grand Slam main draw- at the 2005 Wimbledon Championships where she lost in a tight three-setter to No. 9 seed Anastasia Myskina, 5–7, 7–6^{(5)}, 6–4. In 2004, Kateřina, alongside Michaëlla Krajicek, won the girls' doubles title at the 2004 French Open. She was also the runner-up at the 2003 French Open and the 2003 Wimbledon Championships girls' doubles events, both with Krajicek.

== ITF Circuit finals ==
$100,000 tournaments
$75,000 tournaments
$50,000 tournaments
$25,000 tournaments
$10,000 tournaments

=== Singles (3–4) ===
Result	No.	Date	Tournament	Surface	Opponent	Score
Win	1.	24 August 2003	Kedzierzyn-Kozle, Poland	Clay	(Poland) Marta Leśniak	2–6, 6–2, 6–2
Loss	2.	28 March 2004	Athens, Greece	Hard	(France) Virginie Pichet	1–6, 2–6
Loss	3.	23 May 2004	Caserta, Italy	Clay (i)	(Spain) Paula García	6–0, 3–6, 2–6
Win	4.	20 June 2004	Lenzerheide, Switzerland	Clay	(Germany) Julia Babilon	6–4, 6–4
Loss	5.	8 August 2004	Rimini, Italy	Clay	(Ukraine) Yuliana Fedak	4–6, 3–6
Win	6.	8 October 2005	Barcelona Ladies Open, Spain	Clay	(Spain) María Sánchez Lorenzo	3–6, 6–3, 7–5
Loss	7.	6 August 2006	Baden-Baden, Germany	Clay	(Germany) Martina Müller	1–6, 1–6

=== Doubles (0–1) ===
Result	No.	Date	Tournament	Surface	Partner	Opponents	Score
Loss	1.	4 December 2005	Palm Beach Gardens, United States	Clay	(Czech Republic) Olga Vymetálková	(Chinese Taipei) Chan Chin-wei (Chinese Taipei) Hsieh Su-wei	6–7^{(2–7)}, 5–7
