= 2003 Wimbledon Championships – Women's singles qualifying =

Women's singles qualifying
- 2003 Wimbledon Championships

Events
| Singles | men | women | | boys | girls |
| Doubles | men | women | mixed | boys | girls |
| WC Singles | men | women | quad |
| WC Doubles | men | women | quad |
| Legends | men | women | seniors |

Qualification
| Singles | men | women |
| Doubles | men | women |
- Wimbledon Championships

Players and pairs who neither have high enough rankings nor receive wild cards may participate in a qualifying tournament held one week before the annual Wimbledon Tennis Championships.

== Seeds ==
1. (Slovakia) Martina Suchá (qualified)
2. (Luxembourg) Claudine Schaul (second round)
3. (Israel) Tzipora Obziler (first round)
4. (United States) Meilen Tu (second round)
5. (Spain) Arantxa Parra Santonja (qualifying competition, lucky loser)
6. (Slovakia) Ľubomíra Kurhajcová (second round)
7. (Indonesia) Wynne Prakusya (second round)
8. (Czech Republic) Renata Voráčová (first round)
9. (Venezuela) María Vento-Kabchi (second round)
10. (Slovakia) Eva Fislová (qualified)
11. (Canada) Maureen Drake (qualified)
12. (Italy) Mara Santangelo (second round)
13. (Netherlands) Seda Noorlander (qualifying competition, lucky loser)
14. (Germany) Julia Schruff (qualifying competition)
15. (Serbia and Montenegro) Jelena Janković (first round)
16. (Belarus) Olga Barabanschikova (first round)
17. (Canada) Vanessa Webb (first round)
18. (Venezuela) Milagros Sequera (qualified)
19. (Sweden) Sofia Arvidsson (second round)
20. (Argentina) Gisela Dulko (second round)
21. (United States) Mashona Washington (first round)
22. (Italy) Adriana Serra Zanetti (second round)
23. (United States) Tara Snyder (first round)
24. (Czech Republic) Libuše Průšová (second round)

== Qualifiers ==
1. (Slovakia) Martina Suchá
2. (Slovakia) Stanislava Hrozenská
3. (United States) Carly Gullickson
4. (Chinese Taipei) Janet Lee
5. (Venezuela) Milagros Sequera
6. (United States) Bea Bielik
7. (Hungary) Anikó Kapros
8. (Tunisia) Selima Sfar
9. (United States) Lilia Osterloh
10. (Slovakia) Eva Fislová
11. (Canada) Maureen Drake
12. (Czech Republic) Barbora Strýcová

== Lucky losers ==
1. (Spain) Arantxa Parra Santonja
2. (Netherlands) Seda Noorlander

== Qualifying draw ==
=== First qualifier ===
First round
1 | (Slovakia) Martina Suchá | 6 | 6
(France) Amandine Dulon | 1 | 3
(South Africa) Natalie Grandin | 6 | 7^{7}
(Germany) Gréta Arn | 2 | 6^{5}
(Czech Republic) Alena Vašková | 6 | 6
(Czech Republic) Lenka Němečková | 2 | 2
WC | (United Kingdom) Sarah Borwell | 3 | 4
20 | (Argentina) Gisela Dulko | 6 | 6

Second round
1 | (Slovakia) Martina Suchá | 6 | 7
(South Africa) Natalie Grandin | 4 | 5
(Czech Republic) Alena Vašková | 1 | 6 | 6
20 | (Argentina) Gisela Dulko | 6 | 1 | 2

Qualifying competition
1 | (Slovakia) Martina Suchá | 6 | 7
(Czech Republic) Alena Vašková | 0 | 5

=== Second qualifier ===
First round
2 | (Luxembourg) Claudine Schaul | 2 | 7 | 6
(Bulgaria) Maria Geznenge | 6 | 5 | 2
(United States) Sunitha Rao | 6 | 6
(Italy) Nathalie Viérin | 2 | 4
(Slovakia) Stanislava Hrozenská | 6 | 6
(Russia) Maria Goloviznina | 4 | 3
(Argentina) María Emilia Salerni | 6 | 4 | 5
24 | (Czech Republic) Libuše Průšová | 1 | 6 | 7

Second round
2 | (Luxembourg) Claudine Schaul | 6^{3} | 6 | 0
(United States) Sunitha Rao | 7^{7} | 4 | 6
(Slovakia) Stanislava Hrozenská | 6 | 5 | 6
24 | (Czech Republic) Libuše Průšová | 3 | 7 | 1

Qualifying competition
(United States) Sunitha Rao | 5 | 3
(Slovakia) Stanislava Hrozenská | 7 | 6

=== Third qualifier ===
First round
3 | (Israel) Tzipora Obziler | 6^{3} | 6 | 4
(Australia) Christina Wheeler | 7^{7} | 4 | 6
Alt | (Russia) Galina Voskoboeva | 3 | 4
WC | (United States) Carly Gullickson | 6 | 6
(South Africa) Chanelle Scheepers | 6^{3} | 2
(United States) Bethanie Mattek | 7^{7} | 6
(Estonia) Maret Ani | 5 | 6 | 6
17 | (Canada) Vanessa Webb | 7 | 4 | 4

Second round
(Australia) Christina Wheeler | 6 | 2 | 3
WC | (United States) Carly Gullickson | 4 | 6 | 6
(United States) Bethanie Mattek | 6 | 6
(Estonia) Maret Ani | 1 | 2

Qualifying competition
WC | (United States) Carly Gullickson | 6 | 6
(United States) Bethanie Mattek | 2 | 4

=== Fourth qualifier ===
First round
4 | (United States) Meilen Tu | 6 | 6
(Czech Republic) Magdalena Zděnovcová | 4 | 1
(Chinese Taipei) Janet Lee | 7^{8} | 6^{5} | 6
(Australia) Rachel McQuillan | 6^{6} | 7^{7} | 1
(Italy) Roberta Vinci | 4 | 6 | 6
WC | (Russia) Vera Dushevina | 6 | 4 | 3
(United States) Teryn Ashley | 6 | 3 | 0
19 | (Sweden) Sofia Arvidsson | 3 | 6 | 6

Second round
4 | (United States) Meilen Tu | 3 | 6 | 3
(Chinese Taipei) Janet Lee | 6 | 3 | 6
(Italy) Roberta Vinci | 7 | 6
19 | (Sweden) Sofia Arvidsson | 5 | 4

Qualifying competition
(Chinese Taipei) Janet Lee | 6 | 1 | 7
(Italy) Roberta Vinci | 4 | 6 | 5

=== Fifth qualifier ===
First round
5 | (Spain) Arantxa Parra Santonja | 2 | 6 | 6
(Hungary) Katalin Marosi | 6 | 1 | 3
(Puerto Rico) Kristina Brandi | 6 | 6
(Ukraine) Alona Bondarenko | 1 | 0
(Ukraine) Yuliya Beygelzimer | 5 | 6 | 6
(Austria) Evelyn Fauth | 7 | 1 | 4
(Russia) Maria Kirilenko | 3 | 7 | 1
18 | (Venezuela) Milagros Sequera | 6 | 5 | 6

Second round
5 | (Spain) Arantxa Parra Santonja | 0 | 7^{7} | 6
(Puerto Rico) Kristina Brandi | 6 | 6^{1} | 0
(Ukraine) Yuliya Beygelzimer | 4 | 6 | 9
18 | (Venezuela) Milagros Sequera | 6 | 3 | 11

Qualifying competition
5 | (Spain) Arantxa Parra Santonja | 5 | 2
18 | (Venezuela) Milagros Sequera | 7 | 6

=== Sixth qualifier ===
First round
6 | (Slovakia) Ľubomíra Kurhajcová | 6 | 6
(United States) Tiffany Dabek | 3 | 0
(Germany) Sandra Klösel | 6 | 5 | 6
(Hungary) Zsófia Gubacsi | 4 | 7 | 4
(Croatia) Ivana Abramović | 3 | 7^{7} | 13
(Canada) Marie-Ève Pelletier | 6 | 6^{5} | 11
(United States) Bea Bielik | 6 | 6
23 | (United States) Tara Snyder | 3 | 4

Second round
6 | (Slovakia) Ľubomíra Kurhajcová | 2 | 4
(Germany) Sandra Klösel | 6 | 6
(Croatia) Ivana Abramović | 6^{1} | 2
(United States) Bea Bielik | 7^{7} | 6

Qualifying competition
(Germany) Sandra Klösel | 0 | 6 | 0
(United States) Bea Bielik | 6 | 3 | 6

=== Seventh qualifier ===
First round
7 | (Indonesia) Wynne Prakusya | 2 | 7 | 6
(Germany) Nina Dübbers | 6 | 5 | 3
(United States) Shenay Perry | 2 | 7 | 1
(Hungary) Anikó Kapros | 6 | 5 | 6
WC | (United Kingdom) Helen Crook | 6 | 6
(Republic of Ireland) Kelly Liggan | 1 | 4
(Romania) Andreea Vanc | 6 | 3 | 6
15 | (Serbia and Montenegro) Jelena Janković | 1 | 6 | 4

Second round
7 | (Indonesia) Wynne Prakusya | 2 | 4
(Hungary) Anikó Kapros | 6 | 6
WC | (United Kingdom) Helen Crook | 6 | 2 | 2
(Romania) Andreea Vanc | 2 | 6 | 6

Qualifying competition
(Hungary) Anikó Kapros | 6 | 4 | 6
(Romania) Andreea Vanc | 2 | 6 | 4

=== Eighth qualifier ===
First round
8 | (Czech Republic) Renata Voráčová | 4 | 4
(Tunisia) Selima Sfar | 6 | 6
(Russia) Galina Fokina | 6 | 7^{7}
(Austria) Sybille Bammer | 1 | 6^{2}
(Japan) Yuka Yoshida | 6 | 6
(Morocco) Bahia Mouhtassine | 3 | 4
(France) Séverine Beltrame | 6 | 4 | 6
16 | (Belarus) Olga Barabanschikova | 4 | 6 | 3

Second round
(Tunisia) Selima Sfar | 7 | 6
(Russia) Galina Fokina | 5 | 2
(Japan) Yuka Yoshida | 6 | 6
(France) Séverine Beltrame | 1 | 2

Qualifying competition
(Tunisia) Selima Sfar | 6 | 2 | 6
(Japan) Yuka Yoshida | 4 | 6 | 2

=== Ninth qualifier ===
First round
9 | (Venezuela) María Vento-Kabchi | 7 | 6
(Germany) Vanessa Henke | 5 | 1
(United States) Lilia Osterloh | 6 | 6
(United States) Gabriela Lastra | 1 | 4
(Croatia) Mirjana Lučić | 6 | 6
(Belarus) Nadejda Ostrovskaya | 1 | 1
(Czech Republic) Olga Blahotová | 6 | 7
21 | (United States) Mashona Washington | 4 | 5

Second round
9 | (Venezuela) María Vento-Kabchi | 6 | 6^{4} | 1
(United States) Lilia Osterloh | 0 | 7^{7} | 6
(Croatia) Mirjana Lučić | 6 | 6
(Czech Republic) Olga Blahotová | 3 | 3

Qualifying competition
(United States) Lilia Osterloh | 6 | 2 | 6
(Croatia) Mirjana Lučić | 0 | 6 | 2

=== Tenth qualifier ===
First round
10 | (Slovakia) Eva Fislová | 6 | 6
(Russia) Olga Kalyuzhnaya | 2 | 2
(Ukraine) Elena Tatarkova | 6 | 6
(Germany) Martina Müller | 0 | 4
WC | (United Kingdom) Cristelle Grier | 6 | 6
WC | (United Kingdom) Anna Hawkins | 3 | 0
(Argentina) Natalia Gussoni | 2 | 7^{7} | 3
14 | (Germany) Julia Schruff | 6 | 6^{5} | 6

Second round
10 | (Slovakia) Eva Fislová | 7^{7} | 6
(Ukraine) Elena Tatarkova | 6^{1} | 2
WC | (United Kingdom) Cristelle Grier | 7 | 2 | 3
14 | (Germany) Julia Schruff | 5 | 6 | 6

Qualifying competition
10 | (Slovakia) Eva Fislová | 6 | 6
14 | (Germany) Julia Schruff | 4 | 2

=== Eleventh qualifier ===
First round
11 | (Canada) Maureen Drake | 6 | 4 | 7
(Ukraine) Yuliana Fedak | 2 | 6 | 5
(France) Camille Pin | 4 | 7^{10} | 6
(South Korea) Jeon Mi-ra | 6 | 6^{8} | 3
(Germany) Bianka Lamade | 2 | 4
(Slovakia) Zuzana Kučová | 6 | 6
WC | (United Kingdom) Emily Webley-Smith | 2 | 1
13 | (Netherlands) Seda Noorlander | 6 | 6

Second round
11 | (Canada) Maureen Drake | 6 | 4
(France) Camille Pin | 1 | 1^{r}
(Slovakia) Zuzana Kučová | 2 | 2
13 | (Netherlands) Seda Noorlander | 6 | 6

Qualifying competition
11 | (Canada) Maureen Drake | 6 | 2 | 6
13 | (Netherlands) Seda Noorlander | 3 | 6 | 4

=== Twelfth qualifier ===
First round
12 | (Italy) Mara Santangelo | 6 | 6
(Italy) Francesca Lubiani | 0 | 1
(Netherlands) Kristie Boogert | 2 | 6 | 4
(Czech Republic) Eva Birnerová | 6 | 2 | 6
(Netherlands) Anousjka van Exel | 4 | 3
(Czech Republic) Barbora Strýcová | 6 | 6
WC | (Australia) Casey Dellacqua | 7 | 2 | 3
22 | (Italy) Adriana Serra Zanetti | 5 | 6 | 6

Second round
12 | (Italy) Mara Santangelo | 4 | 6^{9}
(Czech Republic) Eva Birnerová | 6 | 7^{11}
(Czech Republic) Barbora Strýcová | 6 | 6
22 | (Italy) Adriana Serra Zanetti | 2 | 4

Qualifying competition
(Czech Republic) Eva Birnerová | 5 | 3
(Czech Republic) Barbora Strýcová | 7 | 6
