= 2003 Wimbledon Championships – Women's doubles qualifying =

Women's doubles qualifying
- 2003 Wimbledon Championships

Events
Singles	men	women		boys	girls
Doubles	men	women	mixed	boys	girls
WC Singles	men	women	quad
WC Doubles	men	women	quad
Legends	men	women	seniors

Qualification
Singles	men	women
Doubles	men	women
- Wimbledon Championships

Players and pairs who neither have high enough rankings nor receive wild cards may participate in a qualifying tournament held one week before the annual Wimbledon Tennis Championships.

== Seeds ==
1. (Australia) Bryanne Stewart / (Australia) Christina Wheeler (qualified)
2. (Ukraine) Yuliana Fedak / (Russia) Galina Fokina (qualifying competition)
3. (United States) Jill Craybas / (Canada) Vanessa Webb (qualified)
4. (Estonia) Maret Ani / (South Africa) Kim Grant (first round)
5. (United States) Ansley Cargill / (Republic of Ireland) Kelly Liggan (first round)
6. (Australia) Nicole Sewell / (Australia) Sarah Stone (qualified)
7. (United States) Elizabeth Schmidt / (Netherlands) Anousjka van Exel (qualifying competition)
8. (Slovakia) Stanislava Hrozenská / (Slovakia) Ľubomíra Kurhajcová (first round)

== Qualifiers ==
1. (Australia) Bryanne Stewart / (Australia) Christina Wheeler
2. (Italy) Francesca Schiavone / (Italy) Adriana Serra Zanetti
3. (United States) Jill Craybas / (Canada) Vanessa Webb
4. (Australia) Nicole Sewell / (Australia) Sarah Stone

== Qualifying draw ==
=== First qualifier ===
First round
1	(Australia) Bryanne Stewart (Australia) Christina Wheeler	6	4	6
(Czech Republic) Olga Blahotová (Luxembourg) Claudine Schaul	2	6	4
(United States) Gabriela Lastra (United States) Shenay Perry	1	6^{2}
7	(United States) Elizabeth Schmidt (Netherlands) Anousjka van Exel	6	7^{7}

Qualifying competition
1	(Australia) Bryanne Stewart (Australia) Christina Wheeler	6	6
7	(United States) Elizabeth Schmidt (Netherlands) Anousjka van Exel	3	3

=== Second qualifier ===
First round
2	(Ukraine) Yuliana Fedak (Russia) Galina Fokina	6	6
(Serbia and Montenegro) Katarina Mišić (Russia) Galina Voskoboeva	4	3
(Italy) Francesca Schiavone (Italy) Adriana Serra Zanetti	6	6
8	(Slovakia) Stanislava Hrozenská (Slovakia) Ľubomíra Kurhajcová	2	2

Qualifying competition
2	(Ukraine) Yuliana Fedak (Russia) Galina Fokina	3	6^{4}
(Italy) Francesca Schiavone (Italy) Adriana Serra Zanetti	6	7^{7}

=== Third qualifier ===
First round
3	(United States) Jill Craybas (Canada) Vanessa Webb	6	6
WC	(United Kingdom) Karen Paterson (United Kingdom) Emily Webley-Smith	2	3
(Latvia) Līga Dekmeijere (Canada) Renata Kolbovic	7^{7}	6
5	(United States) Ansley Cargill (Republic of Ireland) Kelly Liggan	6^{5}	3

Qualifying competition
3	(United States) Jill Craybas (Canada) Vanessa Webb	6	6
(Latvia) Līga Dekmeijere (Canada) Renata Kolbovic	1	4

=== Fourth qualifier ===
First round
4	(Estonia) Maret Ani (South Africa) Kim Grant	3	4
(Italy) Maria Elena Camerin (Russia) Dinara Safina	6	6
(Hungary) Zsófia Gubacsi (Morocco) Bahia Mouhtassine	4	7^{7}	4
6	(Australia) Nicole Sewell (Australia) Sarah Stone	6	6^{2}	6

Qualifying competition
(Italy) Maria Elena Camerin (Russia) Dinara Safina	7^{7}	4	2
6	(Australia) Nicole Sewell (Australia) Sarah Stone	6^{5}	6	6
