= 2003 Wimbledon Championships – Men's singles qualifying =

Men's singles qualifying
- 2003 Wimbledon Championships

Events
Singles	men	women		boys	girls
Doubles	men	women	mixed	boys	girls
WC Singles	men	women	quad
WC Doubles	men	women	quad
Legends	men	women	seniors

Qualification
Singles	men	women
Doubles	men	women
- Wimbledon Championships

Players and pairs who neither have high enough rankings nor receive wild cards may participate in a qualifying tournament held one week before the annual Wimbledon Tennis Championships.

== Seeds ==
1. (Romania) Victor Hănescu (qualifying competition, lucky loser)
2. (Belgium) Kristof Vliegen (first round)
3. (Belgium) Dick Norman (qualified)
4. (Brazil) Ricardo Mello (second round)
5. (France) Nicolas Thomann (first round)
6. (Spain) Fernando Verdasco (qualified)
7. (France) Cyril Saulnier (qualified)
8. (United States) Robert Kendrick (qualifying competition, lucky loser)
9. (France) Grégory Carraz (second round)
10. (France) Michaël Llodra (qualified)
11. (Peru) Iván Miranda (first round)
12. (Australia) Peter Luczak (first round)
13. (Switzerland) Ivo Heuberger (qualified)
14. (France) Jérôme Golmard (withdrew)
15. (Austria) Julian Knowle (first round)
16. (Philippines) Cecil Mamiit (second round)
17. (Russia) Andrei Stoliarov (first round)
18. (South Africa) Wesley Moodie (qualified)
19. (Russia) Igor Kunitsyn (qualifying competition, lucky loser)
20. (Czech Republic) Tomáš Zíb (qualifying competition, lucky loser)
21. (Switzerland) George Bastl (first round)
22. (France) Julien Varlet (first round)
23. (Italy) Stefano Galvani (qualifying competition, lucky loser)
24. (United States) Eric Taino (first round)
25. (Israel) Noam Okun (qualifying competition)
26. (Sweden) Robin Söderling (qualified)
27. (Chile) Hermes Gamonal (first round)
28. (United States) Alex Kim (first round)
29. (Argentina) Marcelo Charpentier (first round)
30. (Belgium) Gilles Elseneer (qualified)
31. (United States) Paul Goldstein (first round)
32. (Uzbekistan) Vadim Kutsenko (first round)

== Qualifiers ==
1. (Greece) Konstantinos Economidis
2. (Croatia) Ivo Karlović
3. (Belgium) Dick Norman
4. (South Africa) Wesley Moodie
5. (Czech Republic) Petr Luxa
6. (Spain) Fernando Verdasco
7. (France) Cyril Saulnier
8. (Canada) Frédéric Niemeyer
9. (Australia) Paul Baccanello
10. (France) Michaël Llodra
11. (Sweden) Robin Söderling
12. (Australia) Todd Larkham
13. (Switzerland) Ivo Heuberger
14. (Japan) Takao Suzuki
15. (Belgium) Gilles Elseneer
16. (Slovakia) Michal Mertiňák

== Lucky losers ==
1. (Romania) Victor Hănescu
2. (United States) Robert Kendrick
3. (Russia) Igor Kunitsyn
4. (Czech Republic) Tomáš Zíb
5. (Italy) Stefano Galvani

== Qualifying draw ==
=== First qualifier ===
First round
1	(Romania) Victor Hănescu	7^{7}	4	16
(Switzerland) Marco Chiudinelli	6^{2}	6	14
(Brazil) Pedro Braga	6^{5}	4
(Brazil) Marcos Daniel	7^{7}	6
(Italy) Cristiano Caratti	6	6
(Italy) Uros Vico	3	4
(Greece) Konstantinos Economidis	7^{7}	6
22	(France) Julien Varlet	6^{5}	1

Second round
1	(Romania) Victor Hănescu	6	6
(Brazil) Marcos Daniel	4	3
(Italy) Cristiano Caratti	2	4
(Greece) Konstantinos Economidis	6	6

Qualifying competition
1	(Romania) Victor Hănescu	6	0^{r}
(Greece) Konstantinos Economidis	3	1

=== Second qualifier ===
First round
2	(Belgium) Kristof Vliegen	4	5
(Argentina) Juan Pablo Guzmán	6	7
(Russia) Dmitry Tursunov	6^{5}	5
(Croatia) Ivo Karlović	7^{7}	7
(Australia) Joseph Sirianni	6	7^{7}
WC	(United Kingdom) James Auckland	4	6^{4}
(Italy) Stefano Pescosolido	6	6
29	(Argentina) Marcelo Charpentier	2	1

Second round
(Argentina) Juan Pablo Guzmán	3	7^{7}	6
(Croatia) Ivo Karlović	6	6^{5}	8
(Australia) Joseph Sirianni	5	6	2
(Italy) Stefano Pescosolido	7	4	6

Qualifying competition
(Croatia) Ivo Karlović	6	6^{5}	6	7^{11}
(Italy) Stefano Pescosolido	3	7^{7}	3	6^{9}

=== Third qualifier ===
First round
3	(Belgium) Dick Norman	7	5	6
(Argentina) Ignacio González King	5	7	4
(Argentina) Carlos Berlocq	0	0^{r}
(Czech Republic) Ota Fukárek	6	2
(Czech Republic) Pavel Šnobel	6	6
(France) Thierry Ascione	2	2
WC	(United Kingdom) Chris Lewis	6^{3}	6	6
17	(Russia) Andrei Stoliarov	7^{7}	1	4

Second round
3	(Belgium) Dick Norman	6	6
(Czech Republic) Ota Fukárek	3	3
(Czech Republic) Pavel Šnobel	2	5
WC	(United Kingdom) Chris Lewis	6	7

Qualifying competition
3	(Belgium) Dick Norman	7	6	7^{13}
WC	(United Kingdom) Chris Lewis	5	3	6^{11}

=== Fourth qualifier ===
First round
4	(Brazil) Ricardo Mello	6	3	8
(Italy) Massimo Dell'Acqua	3	6	6
(Croatia) Roko Karanušić	6	6
(Spain) Francisco Fogués	4	3
(Russia) Yuri Schukin	4	6	3
(United States) Kevin Kim	6	3	6
(France) Rodolphe Cadart	1	6	5
18	(South Africa) Wesley Moodie	6	3	7

Second round
4	(Brazil) Ricardo Mello	4	4
(Croatia) Roko Karanušić	6	6
(United States) Kevin Kim	3	6^{6}
18	(South Africa) Wesley Moodie	6	7^{8}

Qualifying competition
(Croatia) Roko Karanušić	6	4	3	3
18	(South Africa) Wesley Moodie	3	6	6	6

=== Fifth qualifier ===
First round
5	(France) Nicolas Thomann	6	6^{6}	4
(Czech Republic) Petr Luxa	3	7^{8}	6
(Chinese Taipei) Lu Yen-hsun	3	6^{2}
(United States) Zack Fleishman	6	7^{7}
(Brazil) Francisco Costa	3	4
(Ecuador) Giovanni Lapentti	6	6
(Czech Republic) Jan Hájek	7^{9}	6
21	(Switzerland) George Bastl	6^{7}	3

Second round
(Czech Republic) Petr Luxa	1	6	9
(United States) Zack Fleishman	6	2	7
(Ecuador) Giovanni Lapentti	7^{9}	6
(Czech Republic) Jan Hájek	6^{7}	3

Qualifying competition
(Czech Republic) Petr Luxa	2	6	7^{7}	2	6
(Ecuador) Giovanni Lapentti	6	4	6^{5}	6	3

=== Sixth qualifier ===
First round
6	(Spain) Fernando Verdasco	7^{7}	7
(Serbia and Montenegro) Boris Pašanski	6^{1}	5
(France) Jean-François Bachelot	7^{7}	6
(Sweden) Joachim Johansson	6^{4}	3
(Italy) Potito Starace	6	6
WC	(United Kingdom) Tom Burn	4	2
(Spain) Tati Rascón	4	2
20	(Czech Republic) Tomáš Zíb	6	6

Second round
6	(Spain) Fernando Verdasco	6^{1}	7^{7}	6
(France) Jean-François Bachelot	7^{7}	6^{2}	3
(Italy) Potito Starace	1	3
20	(Czech Republic) Tomáš Zíb	6	6

Qualifying competition
6	(Spain) Fernando Verdasco	6	5	6	6
20	(Czech Republic) Tomáš Zíb	4	7	3	2

=== Seventh qualifier ===
First round
7	(France) Cyril Saulnier	6	6
(United States) Doug Bohaboy	1	3
(Germany) Maximilian Abel	1	2
(France) Slimane Saoudi	6	6
(United States) Jack Brasington	7	5	13
(Australia) Jaymon Crabb	5	7	11
(Croatia) Lovro Zovko	4	3
19	(Russia) Igor Kunitsyn	6	6

Second round
7	(France) Cyril Saulnier	6	6^{8}	6
(France) Slimane Saoudi	4	7^{10}	1
(United States) Jack Brasington	3	4
19	(Russia) Igor Kunitsyn	6	6

Qualifying competition
7	(France) Cyril Saulnier	6	6	6
19	(Russia) Igor Kunitsyn	0	4	4

=== Eighth qualifier ===
First round
8	(United States) Robert Kendrick	7^{7}	7^{11}
(United States) Thomas Blake	6^{1}	6^{9}
(Thailand) Danai Udomchoke	6^{3}	0
(Germany) Oliver Gross	7^{7}	6
(Australia) Alun Jones	5
(Italy) Daniele Bracciali	4^{r}
PR	(Canada) Frédéric Niemeyer	7	6
27	(Chile) Hermes Gamonal	5	0

Second round
8	(United States) Robert Kendrick	7^{7}	0	6
(Germany) Oliver Gross	6^{4}	6	4
(Australia) Alun Jones	3	6	4
PR	(Canada) Frédéric Niemeyer	6	3	6

Qualifying competition
8	(United States) Robert Kendrick	4	6^{4}	5
PR	(Canada) Frédéric Niemeyer	6	7^{7}	7

=== Ninth qualifier ===
First round
9	(France) Grégory Carraz	6	6
PR	(Argentina) Cristian Kordasz	3	4
(Germany) Christopher Kas	4	3
(Australia) Paul Baccanello	6	6
(Japan) Gouichi Motomura	2	6	6
(Spain) Marc López	6	4	3
(Brazil) Alexandre Simoni	6	6
24	(United States) Eric Taino	1	3

Second round
9	(France) Grégory Carraz	5	4
(Australia) Paul Baccanello	7	6
(Japan) Gouichi Motomura	6	6
(Brazil) Alexandre Simoni	4	4

Qualifying competition
(Australia) Paul Baccanello	6	6	6
(Japan) Gouichi Motomura	4	4	2

=== Tenth qualifier ===
First round
10	(France) Michaël Llodra	7^{7}	3	7
WC	(Zimbabwe) Wayne Black	6^{3}	6	5
WC	(Australia) Todd Reid	7	7
(Germany) Björn Phau	5	5
(Spain) Juan Giner	2	3
(Republic of Ireland) Peter Clarke	6	6
(Spain) Mariano Albert-Ferrando	2	2
23	(Italy) Stefano Galvani	6	6

Second round
10	(France) Michaël Llodra	7^{8}	7^{7}
WC	(Australia) Todd Reid	6^{6}	6^{2}
(Republic of Ireland) Peter Clarke	7^{8}	1	3
23	(Italy) Stefano Galvani	6^{6}	6	6

Qualifying competition
10	(France) Michaël Llodra	6	6	6
23	(Italy) Stefano Galvani	3	2	2

=== Eleventh qualifier ===
First round
11	(Peru) Iván Miranda	4	3
(Czech Republic) Michal Tabara	6	6
(Spain) Salvador Navarro	3	6	6
WC	(United Kingdom) David Sanger	6	3	2
(South Africa) Rik de Voest	6^{3}	4
(Czech Republic) Robin Vik	7^{7}	6
(Spain) Óscar Serrano	2	3
26	(Sweden) Robin Söderling	6	6

Second round
(Czech Republic) Michal Tabara	6	6
(Spain) Salvador Navarro	2	1
(Czech Republic) Robin Vik	6	2	2
26	(Sweden) Robin Söderling	4	6	6

Qualifying competition
(Czech Republic) Michal Tabara	1	4	1
26	(Sweden) Robin Söderling	6	6	6

=== Twelfth qualifier ===
First round
12	(Australia) Peter Luczak	2	6	6
(France) Nicolas Mahut	6	3	8
(Australia) Todd Larkham	6	0	6
(Sweden) Björn Rehnquist	3	6	2
(Finland) Tuomas Ketola	6	4	6
(Israel) Noam Behr	2	6	4
(Israel) Harel Levy	2	6	6
31	(United States) Paul Goldstein	6	4	1

Second round
(France) Nicolas Mahut	3	6	8
(Australia) Todd Larkham	6	2	10
(Finland) Tuomas Ketola	1	4
(Israel) Harel Levy	6	6

Qualifying competition
(Australia) Todd Larkham	4	6	2	6	6
(Israel) Harel Levy	6	1	6	3	1

=== Thirteenth qualifier ===
First round
13	(Switzerland) Ivo Heuberger	7	6
(Argentina) Nicolás Todero	5	2
(Argentina) Ignacio Hirigoyen	6	6
(Germany) David Prinosil	4	3
(Austria) Oliver Marach	5	2
(Czech Republic) Jan Hernych	7	6
PR	(Israel) Andy Ram	7^{7}	6
32	(Uzbekistan) Vadim Kutsenko	6^{1}	1

Second round
13	(Switzerland) Ivo Heuberger	6	3	6
(Argentina) Ignacio Hirigoyen	3	6	3
(Czech Republic) Jan Hernych	2	6^{5}
PR	(Israel) Andy Ram	6	7^{7}

Qualifying competition
13	(Switzerland) Ivo Heuberger	7	2	6	7^{7}
PR	(Israel) Andy Ram	5	6	3	6^{5}

=== Fourteenth qualifier ===
First round
Alt	(Japan) Takao Suzuki	6	6
WC	(United Kingdom) Ian Flanagan	3	2
WC	(The Bahamas) Mark Knowles	0^{r}
(Serbia and Montenegro) Janko Tipsarević	0
(Japan) Satoshi Iwabuchi	6	6
(Spain) Gorka Fraile	3	0
(Netherlands Antilles) Jean-Julien Rojer	1	2
25	(Israel) Noam Okun	6	6

Second round
Alt	(Japan) Takao Suzuki	7^{13}	6
(Serbia and Montenegro) Janko Tipsarević	6^{11}	4
(Japan) Satoshi Iwabuchi	4	5
25	(Israel) Noam Okun	6	7

Qualifying competition
Alt	(Japan) Takao Suzuki	6	6	6
25	(Israel) Noam Okun	3	4	4

=== Fifteenth qualifier ===
First round
15	(Austria) Julian Knowle	6^{4}	4
(United States) Jeff Salzenstein	7^{7}	6
(Russia) Dmitry Vlasov	7^{7}	4	5
WC	(Canada) Daniel Nestor	6^{3}	6	7
(Spain) Didac Pérez	1	6	5
(Bulgaria) Radoslav Lukaev	6	3	7
(South Africa) Louis Vosloo	4	4
30	(Belgium) Gilles Elseneer	6	6

Second round
(United States) Jeff Salzenstein	1	4
WC	(Canada) Daniel Nestor	6	6
(Bulgaria) Radoslav Lukaev	7^{7}	4	1
30	(Belgium) Gilles Elseneer	6^{4}	6	6

Qualifying competition
WC	(Canada) Daniel Nestor	7^{11}	3	3	3
30	(Belgium) Gilles Elseneer	6^{9}	6	6	6

=== Sixteenth qualifier ===
First round
16	(Philippines) Cecil Mamiit	6	6
(Chinese Taipei) Wang Yeu-tzuoo	3	3
(Austria) Alexander Peya	6	6
(Israel) Amir Hadad	1	3
(Slovakia) Michal Mertiňák	6	6
(United States) Michael Joyce	4	4
(Italy) Leonardo Azzaro	7^{7}	6
28	(United States) Alex Kim	6^{2}	3

Second round
16	(Philippines) Cecil Mamiit	4	3
(Austria) Alexander Peya	6	6
(Slovakia) Michal Mertiňák	7^{7}	6
(Italy) Leonardo Azzaro	6^{5}	4

Qualifying competition
(Austria) Alexander Peya	6^{1}	5	6^{6}
(Slovakia) Michal Mertiňák	7^{7}	7	7^{8}
