= 2003 Wimbledon Championships – Men's doubles qualifying =

Men's doubles qualifying
- 2003 Wimbledon Championships

Events
Singles	men	women		boys	girls
Doubles	men	women	mixed	boys	girls
WC Singles	men	women	quad
WC Doubles	men	women	quad
Legends	men	women	seniors

Qualification
Singles	men	women
Doubles	men	women
- Wimbledon Championships

Players and pairs who neither have high enough rankings nor receive wild cards may participate in a qualifying tournament held one week before the annual Wimbledon Tennis Championships.

== Seeds ==
1. (Australia) Stephen Huss / (Sweden) Johan Landsberg (qualified)
2. (Australia) Todd Perry / (Japan) Thomas Shimada (qualified)
3. (Israel) Amir Hadad / (Pakistan) Aisam-ul-Haq Qureshi (qualifying competition, lucky losers)
4. n/a
5. (Switzerland) Marco Chiudinelli / (Croatia) Lovro Zovko (qualified)
6. (Australia) Alun Jones / (Australia) Anthony Ross (first round)
7. (Russia) Yuri Schukin / (Russia) Dmitry Vlasov (first round)
8. (South Africa) Rik de Voest / (South Africa) Wesley Moodie (first round)

== Qualifiers ==
1. (Australia) Stephen Huss / (Sweden) Johan Landsberg
2. (Australia) Todd Perry / (Japan) Thomas Shimada
3. (Switzerland) Marco Chiudinelli / (Croatia) Lovro Zovko
4. (Israel) Jonathan Erlich / (Israel) Andy Ram

== Lucky losers ==
1. (Israel) Amir Hadad / (Pakistan) Aisam-ul-Haq Qureshi
2. (Australia) Scott Draper / (Australia) Peter Luczak

== Qualifying draw ==
=== First qualifier ===
First round
1	(Australia) Stephen Huss (Sweden) Johan Landsberg	6	6
(Switzerland) George Bastl (Switzerland) Ivo Heuberger	2	3
(Australia) Scott Draper (Australia) Peter Luczak	5	7^{7}	6
6	(Australia) Alun Jones (Australia) Anthony Ross	7	6^{4}	2

Qualifying competition
1	(Australia) Stephen Huss (Sweden) Johan Landsberg	7^{7}	3	6	6^{9}	6
(Australia) Scott Draper (Australia) Peter Luczak	6^{4}	6	4	7^{11}	3

=== Second qualifier ===
First round
2	(Australia) Todd Perry (Japan) Thomas Shimada	6	6
(Russia) Igor Kunitsyn (Israel) Noam Okun	3	2
(United States) Thomas Blake (Philippines) Cecil Mamiit	7	6
7	(Russia) Yuri Schukin (Russia) Dmitry Vlasov	5	3

Qualifying competition
2	(Australia) Todd Perry (Japan) Thomas Shimada	7^{7}	6	6
(United States) Thomas Blake (United States) Cecil Mamiit	6^{4}	3	2

=== Third qualifier ===
First round
3	(Israel) Amir Hadad (Pakistan) Aisam-ul-Haq Qureshi	1	6	6
(Peru) Iván Miranda (Brazil) Alexandre Simoni	6	3	2
WC	(United Kingdom) Oliver Freelove (United Kingdom) Chris Lewis	7	3	13
5	(Switzerland) Marco Chiudinelli (Croatia) Lovro Zovko	5	6	15

Qualifying competition
3	(Israel) Amir Hadad (Pakistan) Aisam-ul-Haq Qureshi	6	5	3	6	1
5	(Switzerland) Marco Chiudinelli (Croatia) Lovro Zovko	4	7	6	1	6

=== Fourth qualifier ===
First round
Alt	(Finland) Tuomas Ketola (Canada) Frédéric Niemeyer	4	7^{7}	11
(Belgium) Gilles Elseneer (Belgium) Kristof Vliegen	6	6^{4}	9
(Israel) Jonathan Erlich (Israel) Andy Ram	1	6	7
8	(South Africa) Rik de Voest (South Africa) Wesley Moodie	6	1	5

Qualifying competition
Alt	(Finland) Tuomas Ketola (Canada) Frédéric Niemeyer	3	4	6^{4}
(Israel) Jonathan Erlich (Israel) Andy Ram	6	6	7^{7}
