= 2001 US Open – Women's doubles qualifying =

Women's doubles qualifying
- 2001 US Open

Events
Singles	men	women		boys	girls
Doubles	men	women	mixed	boys	girls
WC Singles	men	women	quad
WC Doubles	men	women	quad
Legends	men	women	mixed

Qualification
Singles	men	women
Doubles	men	women
- US Open

== Seeds ==
1. (India) Nirupama Vaidyanathan / (Romania) Andreea Vanc (first round)
2. (Netherlands) Seda Noorlander / (Belarus) Nadejda Ostrovskaya (first round)
3. (United States) Dawn Buth / (Netherlands) Anousjka van Exel (qualified)
4. (Brazil) Joana Cortez / (Spain) Gisela Riera (qualified)
5. (Germany) Vanessa Henke / (Australia) Bryanne Stewart (qualifying competition, lucky losers)
6. (Australia) Evie Dominikovic / (United States) Marissa Irvin (qualified)
7. (Federal Republic of Yugoslavia) Sandra Načuk / (Czech Republic) Lenka Němečková (qualifying competition)
8. (Argentina) Clarisa Fernández / (Japan) Rika Fujiwara (first round)

== Qualifiers ==
1. (United States) Jennifer Embry / (United States) Abigail Spears
2. (Australia) Evie Dominikovic / (United States) Marissa Irvin
3. (United States) Dawn Buth / (Netherlands) Anousjka van Exel
4. (Brazil) Joana Cortez / (Spain) Gisela Riera

== Lucky losers ==
1. (Germany) Vanessa Henke / (Australia) Bryanne Stewart

== Draw ==
=== First qualifier ===
First round
1	(India) Nirupama Vaidyanathan (Romania) Andreea Vanc	3	2
WC	(United States) Jennifer Embry (United States) Abigail Spears	6	6
(Russia) Galina Fokina (Russia) Evgenia Kulikovskaya	7^{7}	7^{7}
8	(Argentina) Clarisa Fernández (Japan) Rika Fujiwara	6^{4}	6^{4}

Qualifying competition
WC	(United States) Jennifer Embry (United States) Abigail Spears	6	6
(Russia) Galina Fokina (Russia) Evgenia Kulikovskaya	2	2

=== Second qualifier ===
First round
2	(Netherlands) Seda Noorlander (Belarus) Nadejda Ostrovskaya	2	4
(Canada) Renata Kolbovic (Australia) Trudi Musgrave	6	6
(Italy) Francesca Schiavone (Italy) Antonella Serra Zanetti	1	4
6	(Australia) Evie Dominikovic (United States) Marissa Irvin	6	6

Qualifying competition
(Canada) Renata Kolbovic (Australia) Trudi Musgrave	4	2
6	(Australia) Evie Dominikovic (United States) Marissa Irvin	6	6

=== Third qualifier ===
First round
3	(United States) Dawn Buth (Netherlands) Anousjka van Exel	6	6
(Spain) Marta Marrero (Czech Republic) Eva Martincová	3	4
(South Africa) Natalie Grandin (Slovenia) Petra Rampre	5^{r}
7	(Federal Republic of Yugoslavia) Sandra Načuk (Czech Republic) Lenka Němečková	5

Qualifying competition
3	(United States) Dawn Buth (Netherlands) Anousjka van Exel	6	6
7	(Federal Republic of Yugoslavia) Sandra Načuk (Czech Republic) Lenka Němečková	3	1

=== Fourth qualifier ===
First round
4	(Brazil) Joana Cortez (Spain) Gisela Riera	7	4	6
WC	(United States) Ally Baker (United States) Tara Snyder	5	6	3
WC	(United States) Alyssa Cohen (United States) Sunitha Rao	6^{2}	7	4
5	(Germany) Vanessa Henke (Australia) Bryanne Stewart	7^{7}	5	6

Qualifying competition
4	(Brazil) Joana Cortez (Spain) Gisela Riera	6	6
5	(Germany) Vanessa Henke (Australia) Bryanne Stewart	2	2
