= 2001 US Open – Women's singles qualifying =

Women's singles qualifying
- 2001 US Open

Events
Singles	men	women		boys	girls
Doubles	men	women	mixed	boys	girls
WC Singles	men	women	quad
WC Doubles	men	women	quad
Legends	men	women	mixed

Qualification
Singles	men	women
Doubles	men	women
- US Open

This article displays the qualifying draw for the Women's Singles at the 2001 US Open.

== Seeds ==
1. (Czech Republic) Adriana Gerši (qualified)
2. (Bulgaria) Lubomira Bacheva (first round)
3. (Armenia) Marie-Gaïané Mikaelian (qualified)
4. (Germany) Martina Müller (qualifying competition, lucky loser)
5. (Greece) Eleni Daniilidou (qualified)
6. (Germany) Gréta Arn (qualifying competition, lucky loser)
7. (Netherlands) Seda Noorlander (first round)
8. (Russia) Alina Jidkova (second round)
9. (Slovenia) Katarina Srebotnik (qualified)
10. (France) Céline Beigbeder (second round)
11. (Czech Republic) Sandra Kleinová (second round)
12. (Croatia) Jelena Kostanić Tošić (second round)
13. (Argentina) Clarisa Fernández (first round)
14. (Venezuela) María Vento-Kabchi (first round)
15. (Czech Republic) Lenka Nemecková (first round)
16. (Japan) Saori Obata (second round)
17. (Czech Republic) Alena Vašková (qualifying competition)
18. (Croatia) Maja Palaveršić-Coopersmith (qualifying competition)
19. (Canada) Jana Nejedly (qualified)
20. (Austria) Sylvia Plischke (second round)
21. (Kazakhstan) Irina Selyutina (first round)
22. (Germany) Miriam Schnitzer (first round)
23. (United States) Dawn Buth (first round)
24. (United States) Holly Parkinson (second round)
25. (Czech Republic) Klára Koukalová (first round)
26. (Netherlands) Kristie Boogert (first round)
27. (Japan) Rika Fujiwara (qualifying competition)
28. (Japan) Yuka Yoshida (first round)
29. (France) Alexandra Fusai (qualified)
30. (Canada) Vanessa Webb (first round)
31. (United States) Tara Snyder (second round)
32. (Netherlands) Amanda Hopmans (qualified)

== Qualifiers ==
1. (Czech Republic) Adriana Gerši
2. (Austria) Evelyn Fauth
3. (Armenia) Marie-Gaïané Mikaelian
4. (Russia) Evgenia Kulikovskaya
5. (Greece) Eleni Daniilidou
6. (Austria) Barbara Schwartz
7. (Ukraine) Tatiana Perebiynis
8. (Germany) Nina Dübbers
9. (Slovenia) Katarina Srebotnik
10. (Canada) Jana Nejedly
11. (Netherlands) Amanda Hopmans
12. (Slovakia) Lenka Dlhopolcová
13. (Italy) Gloria Pizzichini
14. (South Korea) Cho Yoon-jeong
15. (Italy) Roberta Vinci
16. (France) Alexandra Fusai

== Lucky losers ==
1. (Germany) Martina Müller
2. (Germany) Gréta Arn

== Qualifying draw ==
Key

- Q = Qualifier
- WC = Wild card
- LL = Lucky loser
- Alt = Alternate
- ITF = ITF entry
- PR = Protected ranking
- SR = Special ranking
- SE = Special exempt
- JE = Junior exempt
- JR = Junior Accelerator Programme entrant
- CO = College Accelerator Programme entrant
- NG = Next Gen Accelerator Program entrant
- w/o = Walkover
- r = Retired
- d = Defaulted

=== First qualifier ===
First round
1	(Czech Republic) Adriana Gerši	5	6	7
(Canada) Marie-Ève Pelletier	7	3	5
(Hungary) Katalin Marosi-Aracama	1	5
(Serbia and Montenegro) Dragana Zarić	6	7
(Ukraine) Tatiana Kovalchuk	3	6	6
(Australia) Annabel Ellwood	6	4	2
(Canada) Maureen Drake	4	6	5
18	(Croatia) Maja Palaveršić-Coopersmith	6	2	7

Second round
1	(Czech Republic) Adriana Gerši	6	6
(Serbia and Montenegro) Dragana Zarić	3	1
(Ukraine) Tatiana Kovalchuk	7	5	2
18	(Croatia) Maja Palaveršić-Coopersmith	5	7	6

Qualifying competition
1	(Czech Republic) Adriana Gerši	6	6
18	(Croatia) Maja Palaveršić-Coopersmith	0	3

=== Second qualifier ===
First round
2	(Bulgaria) Lubomira Bacheva	6	3	3
WC	(United States) Cory Ann Avants	4	6	6
(Italy) Giulia Casoni	6	1	5
(Italy) Francesca Lubiani	1	6	7
WC	(United States) Carly Gullickson	2	1
(Austria) Evelyn Fauth	6	6
(Croatia) Mirjana Lučić	6	7^{9}
25	(Czech Republic) Klára Koukalová	4	6^{7}

Second round
WC	(United States) Cory Ann Avants	2	6	6
(Italy) Francesca Lubiani	6	4	4
(Austria) Evelyn Fauth	6	7
(Croatia) Mirjana Lučić	3	5

Qualifying competition
WC	(United States) Cory Ann Avants	2	0^{r}
(Austria) Evelyn Fauth	6	1

=== Third qualifier ===
First round
3	(Armenia) Marie-Gaïané Mikaelian	7	3	6
(Germany) Sandra Klösel	5	6	1
(United States) Tracy Almeda-Singian	6	7
(Canada) Renata Kolbovic	4	5
(United States) Jane Chi	1	6	6
(Brazil) Joana Cortez	6	0	3
(Germany) Angelika Rösch	6	6
21	(Kazakhstan) Irina Selyutina	4	4

Second round
3	(Armenia) Marie-Gaïané Mikaelian	6	6
(United States) Tracy Almeda-Singian	2	3
(United States) Jane Chi	7^{7}	2	6
(Germany) Angelika Rösch	6^{2}	6	2

Qualifying competition
3	(Armenia) Marie-Gaïané Mikaelian	6	6
(United States) Jane Chi	1	3

=== Fourth qualifier ===
First round
4	(Germany) Martina Müller	7	6
(Netherlands) Anousjka van Exel	5	4
WC	(United States) Ally Baker	6	6
(Morocco) Bahia Mouhtassine	2	1
(Russia) Evgenia Kulikovskaya	7	3	6
(Germany) Vanessa Henke	5	6	3
(Germany) Adriana Barna	5	6	6
28	(Japan) Yuka Yoshida	7	0	3

Second round
4	(Germany) Martina Müller	6	6
WC	(United States) Ally Baker	1	3
(Russia) Evgenia Kulikovskaya	6	1	7
(Germany) Adriana Barna	3	6	5

Qualifying competition
4	(Germany) Martina Müller	6	4	5
(Russia) Evgenia Kulikovskaya	2	6	7

=== Fifth qualifier ===
First round
5	(Greece) Eleni Daniilidou	6	7
(Czech Republic) Michaela Paštiková	1	5
(Belarus) Nadejda Ostrovskaya	6	2	5
(United Kingdom) Rachel Viollet	4	6	7
(Czech Republic) Zuzana Ondrášková	4	5
(Belgium) Laurence Courtois	6	7
(Germany) Mia Buric	4	6	4
27	(Japan) Rika Fujiwara	6	1	6

Second round
5	(Greece) Eleni Daniilidou	6	6
(United Kingdom) Rachel Viollet	4	2
(Belgium) Laurence Courtois	3	4
27	(Japan) Rika Fujiwara	6	6

Qualifying competition
5	(Greece) Eleni Daniilidou	2	6	6
27	(Japan) Rika Fujiwara	6	2	3

=== Sixth qualifier ===
First round
6	(Germany) Gréta Arn	6	6
(France) Sophie Georges	2	3
(Austria) Marion Maruska	3	6^{6}
(Italy) Nathalie Viérin	6	7^{8}
(France) Laurence Andretto	6	6
(Hungary) Adrienn Hegedűs	3	3
(Austria) Barbara Schwartz	6	6
23	(United States) Dawn Buth	4	2

Second round
6	(Germany) Gréta Arn	6	3	6
(Italy) Nathalie Viérin	4	6	3
(France) Laurence Andretto	1	1
(Austria) Barbara Schwartz	6	6

Qualifying competition
6	(Germany) Gréta Arn	2	3
(Austria) Barbara Schwartz	6	6

=== Seventh qualifier ===
First round
7	(Netherlands) Seda Noorlander	0	4
(United States) Erika deLone	6	6
WC	(United States) Jamea Jackson	6	6
(Spain) Lourdes Domínguez Lino	3	4
(Australia) Lisa McShea	3	3
(Ukraine) Tatiana Perebiynis	6	6
(Australia) Bryanne Stewart	3	2
20	(Austria) Sylvia Plischke	6	6

Second round
(United States) Erika deLone	6	3
WC	(United States) Jamea Jackson	4	0^{r}
(Ukraine) Tatiana Perebiynis	6	6
20	(Austria) Sylvia Plischke	3	2

Qualifying competition
(United States) Erika deLone	6	3	2
(Ukraine) Tatiana Perebiynis	4	6	6

=== Eighth qualifier ===
First round
8	(Russia) Alina Jidkova	6	6
(Slovenia) Tina Hergold	2	1
(Germany) Nina Dübbers	7^{10}	7
WC	(United States) Diana Ospina	6^{8}	5
(France) Camille Pin	6^{6}	6	6
(Germany) Sabine Klaschka	7^{8}	1	4
(United Kingdom) Elena Baltacha	0	5
17	(Czech Republic) Alena Vašková	6	7

Second round
8	(Russia) Alina Jidkova	6^{14}	1
(Germany) Nina Dübbers	7^{16}	6
(France) Camille Pin	3	1
17	(Czech Republic) Alena Vašková	6	6

Qualifying competition
(Germany) Nina Dübbers	6	6
17	(Czech Republic) Alena Vašková	3	4

=== Ninth qualifier ===
First round
9	(Slovenia) Katarina Srebotnik	6	6
(Bulgaria) Svetlana Krivencheva	3	2
(United Kingdom) Lucie Ahl	6^{4}	1
(Hungary) Kira Nagy	7^{7}	6
(Israel) Hila Rosen	3	1
(Belgium) Els Callens	6	6
(Madagascar) Dally Randriantefy	7^{7}	4	6
22	(Germany) Miriam Schnitzer	6^{5}	6	4

Second round
9	(Slovenia) Katarina Srebotnik	6	6
(Hungary) Kira Nagy	2	3
(Belgium) Els Callens	2	3
(Madagascar) Dally Randriantefy	6	6

Qualifying competition
9	(Slovenia) Katarina Srebotnik	6	6
(Madagascar) Dally Randriantefy	1	1

=== Tenth qualifier ===
First round
10	(France) Céline Beigbeder	1	6	6
(Israel) Tzipora Obziler	6	2	2
(Denmark) Eva Dyrberg	6	6
(Germany) Angelika Bachmann	1	3
(Luxembourg) Claudine Schaul	6	6
WC	(United States) Sunitha Rao	2	2
(Venezuela) Milagros Sequera	3	7	0
19	(Canada) Jana Nejedly	6	5	6

Second round
10	(France) Céline Beigbeder	4	3
(Denmark) Eva Dyrberg	6	6
(Luxembourg) Claudine Schaul	3	3
19	(Canada) Jana Nejedly	6	6

Qualifying competition
(Denmark) Eva Dyrberg	0	5
19	(Canada) Jana Nejedly	6	7

=== Eleventh qualifier ===
First round
11	(Czech Republic) Sandra Kleinová	6	2	6
(Japan) Nana Miyagi	2	6	2
(United Kingdom) Hannah Collin	1	3
(Estonia) Maret Ani	6	6
(Austria) Patricia Wartusch	7^{7}	6
(Australia) Christina Wheeler	6^{2}	1
(France) Sarah Pitkowski-Malcor	2	2
32	(Netherlands) Amanda Hopmans	6	6

Second round
11	(Czech Republic) Sandra Kleinová	1	6	2
(Estonia) Maret Ani	6	4	6
(Austria) Patricia Wartusch	6	1	2
32	(Netherlands) Amanda Hopmans	4	6	6

Qualifying competition
(Estonia) Maret Ani	2	6	4
32	(Netherlands) Amanda Hopmans	6	4	6

=== Twelfth qualifier ===
First round
12	(Croatia) Jelena Kostanić Tošić	6	6
(Canada) Sonya Jeyaseelan	4	2
(Slovakia) Lenka Dlhopolcová	6	6
(Bulgaria) Antoaneta Pandjerova	1	2
(Italy) Antonella Serra Zanetti	6	6
(Slovakia) Gabriela Voleková	3	3
(Serbia and Montenegro) Sandra Načuk	7^{7}	6
26	(Netherlands) Kristie Boogert	6^{3}	2

Second round
12	(Croatia) Jelena Kostanić Tošić
(Slovakia) Lenka Dlhopolcová	w/o
(Italy) Antonella Serra Zanetti	6	6
(Serbia and Montenegro) Sandra Načuk	3	3

Qualifying competition
(Slovakia) Lenka Dlhopolcová	6^{5}	6	6
(Italy) Antonella Serra Zanetti	7^{7}	2	0

=== Thirteenth qualifier ===
First round
13	(Argentina) Clarisa Fernández	6	4	4
(France) Stéphanie Foretz	2	6	6
(Bulgaria) Desislava Topalova	4	4
(Czech Republic) Eva Martincová	6	6
(Uruguay) Daniela Olivera	0	3
(Italy) Gloria Pizzichini	6	6
(Spain) Gisela Riera	2	2
24	(United States) Holly Parkinson	6	6

Second round
(France) Stéphanie Foretz	4	4
(Czech Republic) Eva Martincová	6	6
(Italy) Gloria Pizzichini	6	6
24	(United States) Holly Parkinson	4	4

Qualifying competition
(Czech Republic) Eva Martincová	2	1
(Italy) Gloria Pizzichini	6	6

=== Fourteenth qualifier ===
First round
14	(Venezuela) María Vento-Kabchi	3	0
(Czech Republic) Eva Krejčová	6	6
(Italy) Valentina Sassi	6	6
(Spain) Ainhoa Goñi	3	1
WC	(United States) Megan Bradley	1	6	6^{2}
(South Korea) Cho Yoon-jeong	6	2	7^{7}
(Czech Republic) Jana Hlaváčková	6	6
30	(Canada) Vanessa Webb	2	4

Second round
(Czech Republic) Eva Krejčová	4	4
(Italy) Valentina Sassi	6	6
(South Korea) Cho Yoon-jeong	7^{7}	6
(Czech Republic) Jana Hlaváčková	6^{3}	4

Qualifying competition
(Italy) Valentina Sassi	6	1	3
(South Korea) Cho Yoon-jeong	4	6	6

=== Fifteenth qualifier ===
First round
15	(Czech Republic) Lenka Nemecková	4	6	4
(United Kingdom) Julie Pullin	6	0	6
WC	(United States) Kristina Kraszewski	3	1
(Ukraine) Julia Vakulenko	6	6
(Ukraine) Elena Tatarkova	3	4
(Italy) Roberta Vinci	6	6
(France) Lea Ghirardi	5	1
31	(United States) Tara Snyder	7	6

Second round
(United Kingdom) Julie Pullin	5	7^{7}	3
(Ukraine) Julia Vakulenko	7	6^{3}	6
(Italy) Roberta Vinci	6	3	6
31	(United States) Tara Snyder	0	6	4

Qualifying competition
(Ukraine) Julia Vakulenko	6	4	3
(Italy) Roberta Vinci	2	6	6

=== Sixteenth qualifier ===
First round
16	(Japan) Saori Obata	6	6
(United States) Mashona Washington	4	4
(Spain) Conchita Martínez Granados	2	3
(United States) Samantha Reeves	6	6
(India) Nirupama Vaidyanathan	6	3	5
(Russia) Anastasia Rodionova	4	6	7
WC	(United States) Alyssa Cohen	0	3
29	(France) Alexandra Fusai	6	6

Second round
16	(Japan) Saori Obata	6^{5}	3
(United States) Samantha Reeves	7^{7}	6
(Russia) Anastasia Rodionova	4	2
29	(France) Alexandra Fusai	6	6

Qualifying competition
(United States) Samantha Reeves	3	5
29	(France) Alexandra Fusai	6	7
