= Van Exel =

Van Exel is a surname. Notable people with the surname include:

- Nick Van Exel (born 1971), American basketball player and coach
- Anousjka van Exel (born 1974), Dutch tennis player
