= 2001 US Open – Men's doubles qualifying =

Men's doubles qualifying
- 2001 US Open

Events
Singles	men	women		boys	girls
Doubles	men	women	mixed	boys	girls
WC Singles	men	women	quad
WC Doubles	men	women	quad
Legends	men	women	mixed

Qualification
Singles	men	women
Doubles	men	women
- US Open

This article displays the qualifying draw for the Men's Doubles at the 2001 US Open.

== Seeds ==
1. (Australia) Jordan Kerr / (Australia) Grant Silcock (first round)
2. (Australia) Paul Kilderry / (Germany) Rainer Schüttler (first round)
3. (Australia) Tim Crichton / (Australia) Todd Perry (qualifying competition)
4. (Australia) Dejan Petrović / (Israel) Andy Ram (qualified)
5. (United States) Brandon Coupe / (Australia) Ashley Fisher (first round)
6. (South Africa) Jeff Coetzee / (United Kingdom) Barry Cowan (first round)
7. (Czech Republic) Petr Kovačka / (Russia) Yuri Schukin (qualifying competition)
8. (Finland) Tuomas Ketola / (South Africa) Shaun Rudman (qualifying competition)

== Qualifiers ==
1. (Italy) Andrea Gaudenzi / (Switzerland) Marc Rosset
2. (South Africa) Neville Godwin / (South Africa) Marcos Ondruska
3. (Israel) Noam Behr / (Israel) Harel Levy
4. (Australia) Dejan Petrović / (Israel) Andy Ram

== Qualifying draw ==
=== First qualifier ===
First round
1	(Australia) Jordan Kerr (Australia) Grant Silcock	4	4
(Italy) Andrea Gaudenzi (Switzerland) Marc Rosset	6	6
WC	(United States) K. J. Hippensteel (United States) Phillip King	7^{7}	3	4
7	(Czech Republic) Petr Kovačka (Russia) Yuri Schukin	6^{0}	6	6

Qualifying competition
(Italy) Andrea Gaudenzi (Switzerland) Marc Rosset	6	7
7	(Czech Republic) Petr Kovačka (Russia) Yuri Schukin	1	5

=== Second qualifier ===
First round
2	(Australia) Paul Kilderry (Germany) Rainer Schüttler	6	2	6^{5}
(South Africa) Neville Godwin (South Africa) Marcos Ondruska	4	6	7^{7}
WC	(United States) Levar Harper-Griffith (United States) Travis Parrott	6	4	3
8	(Finland) Tuomas Ketola (South Africa) Shaun Rudman	3	6	6

Qualifying competition
(South Africa) Neville Godwin (South Africa) Marcos Ondruska	6	6^{4}	6
8	(Finland) Tuomas Ketola (South Africa) Shaun Rudman	4	7^{7}	3

=== Third qualifier ===
First round
3	(Australia) Tim Crichton (Australia) Todd Perry	6	6
WC	(United States) Cary Franklin (United States) Graydon Oliver	3	1
(Israel) Noam Behr (Israel) Harel Levy	5	6	6
5	(United States) Brandon Coupe (Australia) Ashley Fisher	7	3	4

Qualifying competition
3	(Australia) Tim Crichton (Australia) Todd Perry	6	1	3
(Israel) Noam Behr (Israel) Harel Levy	2	6	6

=== Fourth qualifier ===
First round
4	(Australia) Dejan Petrović (Israel) Andy Ram	6	7^{7}
(Australia) Stephen Huss (Australia) Lee Pearson	3	6^{3}
(Brazil) Daniel Melo (Brazil) Alexandre Simoni	6^{6}	6	6
6	(South Africa) Jeff Coetzee (United Kingdom) Barry Cowan	7^{8}	3	4

Qualifying competition
4	(Australia) Dejan Petrović (Israel) Andy Ram	7^{7}	7
(Brazil) Daniel Melo (Brazil) Alexandre Simoni	6^{2}	5
