= 2001 US Open – Men's singles qualifying =

Men's singles qualifying
- 2001 US Open

Events
Singles	men	women		boys	girls
Doubles	men	women	mixed	boys	girls
WC Singles	men	women	quad
WC Doubles	men	women	quad
Legends	men	women	mixed

Qualification
Singles	men	women
Doubles	men	women
- US Open

== Seeds ==
1. (Argentina) David Nalbandian (qualified)
2. (Romania) Adrian Voinea (qualifying competition)
3. (Armenia) Sargis Sargsian (first round)
4. (South Africa) Neville Godwin (first round)
5. (United States) Cecil Mamiit (first round)
6. (Czech Republic) Jan Vacek (qualified)
7. (Brazil) André Sá (qualified)
8. (France) Michaël Llodra (second round)
9. (Italy) Federico Luzzi (first round)
10. (Switzerland) George Bastl (qualified)
11. (Paraguay) Ramón Delgado (qualified)
12. (United Kingdom) Jamie Delgado (second round)
13. (Thailand) Paradorn Srichaphan (qualified)
14. (Germany) Oliver Gross (second round)
15. (Netherlands) Peter Wessels (first round, retired)
16. (Zimbabwe) Wayne Black (qualifying competition)
17. (France) Nicolas Thomann (second round)
18. (Czech Republic) Ota Fukárek (second round)
19. (Switzerland) Ivo Heuberger (qualified)
20. (Brazil) Flávio Saretta (first round)
21. (Zimbabwe) Byron Black (qualifying competition)
22. (Germany) Axel Pretzsch (second round)
23. (France) Cyril Saulnier (qualified)
24. (Germany) Tomas Behrend (qualifying competition)
25. (Finland) Jarkko Nieminen (qualifying competition)
26. (Austria) Julian Knowle (qualifying competition)
27. (Germany) Christian Vinck (first round)
28. (Israel) Noam Behr (second round)
29. (Israel) Noam Okun (qualifying competition)
30. (United States) Paul Goldstein (second round)
31. (Germany) Marc-Kevin Goellner (first round)
32. (France) Nicolas Coutelot (first round)

== Qualifiers ==
1. (Argentina) David Nalbandian
2. (Germany) Björn Phau
3. (Switzerland) Ivo Heuberger
4. (United States) Mike Bryan
5. (United States) Eric Taino
6. (Czech Republic) Jan Vacek
7. (Brazil) André Sá
8. (France) Cyril Saulnier
9. (France) Sébastien de Chaunac
10. (Switzerland) George Bastl
11. (Paraguay) Ramón Delgado
12. (United States) Jack Brasington
13. (Thailand) Paradorn Srichaphan
14. (Italy) Cristiano Caratti
15. (United States) Justin Gimelstob
16. (Netherlands) John van Lottum

== Qualifying draw ==
=== First qualifier ===
First round
1	(Argentina) David Nalbandian	6	6
(Romania) Gabriel Trifu	4	2
(Austria) Zbynek Mlynarik	3	6	6
(Slovakia) Ladislav Švarc	6	4	4
(Italy) Stefano Pescosolido	6	1	4
(United States) Vince Spadea	4	6	6
WC	(United States) Brian Vahaly	0	0
28	(Israel) Noam Behr	6	6

Second round
1	(Argentina) David Nalbandian	6	6
(Austria) Zbynek Mlynarik	3	4
(United States) Vince Spadea	4	6	6
28	(Israel) Noam Behr	6	1	4

Qualifying competition
1	(Argentina) David Nalbandian	6	7
(United States) Vince Spadea	0	5

=== Second qualifier ===
First round
2	(Romania) Adrian Voinea	6	6
(Argentina) Ignacio Hirigoyen	3	1
(Romania) Răzvan Sabău	1	0
(Japan) Takahiro Terachi	6	6
(Germany) Björn Phau	6	6
WC	(United States) Phillip King	3	1
(Israel) Lior Mor	2	6	6
31	(Germany) Marc-Kevin Goellner	6	1	4

Second round
2	(Romania) Adrian Voinea	6	6
(Japan) Takahiro Terachi	1	2
(Germany) Björn Phau	6	6
(Israel) Lior Mor	4	4

Qualifying competition
2	(Romania) Adrian Voinea	7^{7}	3	6^{6}
(Germany) Björn Phau	6^{2}	6	7^{8}

=== Third qualifier ===
First round
3	(Armenia) Sargis Sargsian	2	6	3
(United Kingdom) Barry Cowan	6	3	6
(France) Stéphane Huet	6^{5}	2
(Finland) Tuomas Ketola	7^{7}	6
(Uzbekistan) Oleg Ogorodov	6^{4}	7^{7}	6
(Austria) Werner Eschauer	7^{7}	6^{1}	4
(Croatia) Ivan Vajda	4	1
19	(Switzerland) Ivo Heuberger	6	6

Second round
(United Kingdom) Barry Cowan	7	4	6^{4}
(Finland) Tuomas Ketola	5	6	7^{7}
(Uzbekistan) Oleg Ogorodov	4	3
19	(Switzerland) Ivo Heuberger	6	6

Qualifying competition
(Finland) Tuomas Ketola	4	3
19	(Switzerland) Ivo Heuberger	6	6

=== Fourth qualifier ===
First round
4	(South Africa) Neville Godwin	6^{9}	6^{12}
(Croatia) Ivo Karlović	7^{11}	7^{14}
WC	(United States) Mike Bryan	7	6
(Australia) Jaymon Crabb	5	2
(Italy) Filippo Messori	6	6
(Norway) Jan Frode Andersen	0	3
(Argentina) Diego Veronelli	6	2	6
27	(Germany) Christian Vinck	4	6	1

Second round
(Croatia) Ivo Karlović	2	6^{5}
WC	(United States) Mike Bryan	6	7^{7}
(Italy) Filippo Messori	6^{5}	1
(Argentina) Diego Veronelli	7^{7}	6

Qualifying competition
WC	(United States) Mike Bryan	4	7^{7}	6
(Argentina) Diego Veronelli	6	6^{1}	0

=== Fifth qualifier ===
First round
5	(United States) Cecil Mamiit	4	5
(Pakistan) Aisam-ul-Haq Qureshi	6	7
(United States) Eric Taino	4	6	7^{7}
(Germany) Alexander Waske	6	2	6^{4}
(Finland) Tapio Nurminen	4	4
(Brazil) Ricardo Mello	6	6
(United States) Kevin Kim	6	6^{4}	6^{2}
18	(Czech Republic) Ota Fukárek	1	7^{7}	7^{7}

Second round
(Pakistan) Aisam-ul-Haq Qureshi	6^{5}	4
(United States) Eric Taino	7^{7}	6
(Brazil) Ricardo Mello	6	6
18	(Czech Republic) Ota Fukárek	3	4

Qualifying competition
(United States) Eric Taino	6	7^{8}
(Brazil) Ricardo Mello	3	6^{6}

=== Sixth qualifier ===
First round
6	(Czech Republic) Jan Vacek	7^{10}	6
(Italy) Stefano Galvani	6^{8}	1
WC	(United States) Alex Kim	7^{8}	6
(Thailand) Danai Udomchoke	6^{6}	1
(Australia) Richard Fromberg	6^{5}	6^{9}
(South Korea) Yoon Yong-il	7^{7}	7^{11}
(Japan) Takao Suzuki	4	4
29	(Israel) Noam Okun	6	6

Second round
6	(Czech Republic) Jan Vacek	6	6
WC	(United States) Alex Kim	1	1
(South Korea) Yoon Yong-il	3	6	6^{4}
29	(Israel) Noam Okun	6	3	7^{7}

Qualifying competition
6	(Czech Republic) Jan Vacek	7	6
29	(Israel) Noam Okun	5	4

=== Seventh qualifier ===
First round
7	(Brazil) André Sá	6	6
(France) Jean-François Bachelot	2	1
(Federal Republic of Yugoslavia) Nenad Zimonjić	4	6	6
(Israel) Lior Dahan	6	3	4
(Russia) Yuri Schukin	6	3	6
(Slovakia) Ján Krošlák	3	6	3
(South Africa) Marcos Ondruska	2	2
26	(Austria) Julian Knowle	6	6

Second round
7	(Brazil) André Sá	6	6
(Federal Republic of Yugoslavia) Nenad Zimonjić	1	3
(Russia) Yuri Schukin	2	2
26	(Austria) Julian Knowle	6	6

Qualifying competition
7	(Brazil) André Sá	6	7^{7}
26	(Austria) Julian Knowle	0	6^{5}

=== Eighth qualifier ===
First round
8	(France) Michaël Llodra	6	6
WC	(United States) K. J. Hippensteel	3	2
(United States) Michael Joyce	6	3	6
(Czech Republic) Tomáš Cakl	4	6	3
(Uzbekistan) Vadim Kutsenko	3	4
(Israel) Andy Ram	6	6
(Canada) Sébastien Lareau	6^{3}	6^{4}
23	(France) Cyril Saulnier	7^{7}	7^{7}

Second round
8	(France) Michaël Llodra	5	6	3
(United States) Michael Joyce	7	3	6
(Israel) Andy Ram	1	4
23	(France) Cyril Saulnier	6	6

Qualifying competition
(United States) Michael Joyce	3	1
23	(France) Cyril Saulnier	6	6

=== Ninth qualifier ===
First round
9	(Italy) Federico Luzzi	3	4
(Sweden) Fredrik Jonsson	6	6
(France) Sébastien de Chaunac	6	4	6
(Czech Republic) Robin Vik	2	6	3
(Czech Republic) Jan Hernych	6	6
(Argentina) Mariano Delfino	4	0
(Mexico) Alejandro Hernández	3	7	6
20	(Brazil) Flávio Saretta	6	5	2

Second round
(Sweden) Fredrik Jonsson	6	6^{8}	6^{5}
(France) Sébastien de Chaunac	3	7^{10}	7^{7}
(Czech Republic) Jan Hernych	4	4
(Mexico) Alejandro Hernández	6	6

Qualifying competition
(France) Sébastien de Chaunac	7^{7}	1	7
(Mexico) Alejandro Hernández	6^{3}	6	5

=== Tenth qualifier ===
First round
10	(Switzerland) George Bastl	6	7
(United States) Glenn Weiner	1	5
(Japan) Yaoki Ishii	5	7^{7}	3
(France) Grégory Carraz	7	6^{2}	6
(Czech Republic) Tomáš Zíb	6	6
WC	(United States) Brian Baker	2	4
(United States) Jeff Salzenstein	5	7^{7}	6^{5}
24	(Germany) Tomas Behrend	7	6^{2}	7^{7}

Second round
10	(Switzerland) George Bastl	6	6
(France) Grégory Carraz	4	1
(Czech Republic) Tomáš Zíb	6	4	2
24	(Germany) Tomas Behrend	3	6	6

Qualifying competition
10	(Switzerland) George Bastl	7	6
24	(Germany) Tomas Behrend	5	4

=== Eleventh qualifier ===
First round
11	(Paraguay) Ramón Delgado	6	6
(Russia) Denis Golovanov	4	2
(Italy) Giorgio Galimberti	6	7^{8}
(Argentina) Martín Rodríguez	3	6^{6}
(Spain) Emilio Benfele Álvarez	4	7^{8}	6
(Switzerland) Lorenzo Manta	6	6^{6}	4
(South Africa) Justin Bower	6	5	5
25	(Finland) Jarkko Nieminen	3	7	7

Second round
11	(Paraguay) Ramón Delgado	6	6
(Italy) Giorgio Galimberti	3	2
(Spain) Emilio Benfele Álvarez	2	6	5
25	(Finland) Jarkko Nieminen	6	2	7

Qualifying competition
11	(Paraguay) Ramón Delgado	6	6
25	(Finland) Jarkko Nieminen	3	2

=== Twelfth qualifier ===
First round
12	(United Kingdom) Jamie Delgado	6	5	7^{8}
(Indonesia) Suwandi Suwandi	3	7	6^{6}
(Japan) Gouichi Motomura	7^{7}	3	6^{14}
(United States) Jack Brasington	6^{5}	6	7^{16}
(Haiti) Ronald Agénor	6	6
(Czech Republic) František Čermák	4	2
(France) Paul-Henri Mathieu	2	6	2
22	(Germany) Axel Pretzsch	6	3	6

Second round
12	(United Kingdom) Jamie Delgado	5	3
(United States) Jack Brasington	7	6
(Haiti) Ronald Agénor	6	6
22	(Germany) Axel Pretzsch	4	1

Qualifying competition
(United States) Jack Brasington	6	7^{7}
(Haiti) Ronald Agénor	3	6^{4}

=== Thirteenth qualifier ===
First round
13	(Thailand) Paradorn Srichaphan	6	6
(Brazil) Daniel Melo	2	3
(Italy) Vincenzo Santopadre	7	6^{6}	6^{3}
(Belgium) Gilles Elseneer	5	7^{8}	7^{7}
(United States) Robert Kendrick	3	4
(Australia) Todd Woodbridge	6	6
(Canada) Frédéric Niemeyer	7^{9}	6
32	(France) Nicolas Coutelot	6^{7}	0

Second round
13	(Thailand) Paradorn Srichaphan	7	7^{7}
(Belgium) Gilles Elseneer	5	6^{4}
(Australia) Todd Woodbridge	6	6
(Canada) Frédéric Niemeyer	4	4

Qualifying competition
13	(Thailand) Paradorn Srichaphan	7^{7}	6
(Australia) Todd Woodbridge	6^{4}	1

=== Fourteenth qualifier ===
First round
14	(Germany) Oliver Gross	2	6	6
(United States) Brandon Hawk	6	4	1
(France) Cedric Kauffmann	4	2
(Italy) Cristiano Caratti	6	6
(Russia) Dmitry Tursunov	4	6	6
WC	(United States) Rajeev Ram	6	1	3
(United Kingdom) Arvind Parmar	4	1
21	(Zimbabwe) Byron Black	6	6

Second round
14	(Germany) Oliver Gross	7^{7}	2	1
(Italy) Cristiano Caratti	6^{5}	6	6
(Russia) Dmitry Tursunov	2	2
21	(Zimbabwe) Byron Black	6	6

Qualifying competition
(Italy) Cristiano Caratti	4	6	6
21	(Zimbabwe) Byron Black	6	3	4

=== Fifteenth qualifier ===
First round
15	(Netherlands) Peter Wessels	3	0^{r}
(United States) Jeff Morrison	6	1
(Germany) Alexander Popp	6	6^{5}	3
(Italy) Mosé Navarra	3	7^{7}	6
WC	(United States) Ytai Abougzir	0	2
(United States) Justin Gimelstob	6	6
(Italy) Leonardo Azzaro	1	6	3
17	(France) Nicolas Thomann	6	3	6

Second round
(United States) Jeff Morrison	7	6
(Italy) Mosé Navarra	5	1
(United States) Justin Gimelstob	1	6	6
17	(France) Nicolas Thomann	6	3	4

Qualifying competition
(United States) Jeff Morrison	4	4
(United States) Justin Gimelstob	6	6

=== Sixteenth qualifier ===
First round
16	(Zimbabwe) Wayne Black	6	6
(United States) Kristian Capalik	1	3
(Netherlands) Rogier Wassen	5	6	6
(Chile) Fernando González	7	4	4
(Netherlands) John van Lottum	7^{7}	6^{4}	6
(Russia) Artem Derepasko	6^{3}	7^{7}	2
WC	(United States) Zack Fleishman	3	2
30	(United States) Paul Goldstein	6	6

Second round
16	(Zimbabwe) Wayne Black	6^{5}	6	6
(Netherlands) Rogier Wassen	7^{7}	2	4
(Netherlands) John van Lottum	4	7	6
30	(United States) Paul Goldstein	6	5	4

Qualifying competition
16	(Zimbabwe) Wayne Black	5	7^{7}	5
(Netherlands) John van Lottum	7	6^{5}	7
