= Elizabeth Schmidt =

American tennis player

- Full name: Elizabeth Ann Schmidt
- Country (sports): United States
- Born: August 23, 1977 (age 48) Kansas City, Missouri, U.S.
- Height: 5 ft 8 in (173 cm)
- Prize money: $33,258

Singles
- Career record: 46–95
- Highest ranking: No. 380 (February 4, 2002)

Doubles
- Career record: 75–92
- Career titles: 1 ITF
- Highest ranking: No. 137 (January 27, 2003)

Grand Slam doubles results
- Wimbledon: Q2 (2003)

Elizabeth Ann Schmidt (born August 23, 1977) is an American former professional tennis player.

Schmidt, who was raised in Austin, played collegiate tennis for the UCLA Bruins from 1996–97 to 1999–00, earning All-American honors for doubles as a freshman.

Graduating in 2000, Schmidt spent the next four years on the professional tour and reached a best singles ranking of 380 in the world. As a doubles player she was ranked as high as 137, with her doubles highlights including a WTA Tour semi-final appearance at Québec City in 2002 and participation in Wimbledon qualifying in 2003.

Since 2008 she has served as the head coach of women's tennis at Rice University.

== ITF finals ==
Legend
$50,000 tournaments
$40,000 tournaments
$25,000 tournaments
$10,000 tournaments

=== Doubles: 7 (1–6) ===
Outcome	No.	Date	Tournament	Surface	Partner	Opponents	Score
Runner-up	1.	July 18, 1999	Evansville, United States	Hard	(United States) Amanda Augustus	(United States) Amanda Johnson (United States) Andrea Nathan	4–6, 6–3, 3–6
Runner-up	2.	July 2, 2000	Springfield, United States	Hard	(United States) Abigail Spears	(United States) Lauren Barnikow (United States) Erin Burdette	6–3, 3–6, 6–7^{(2)}
Runner-up	3.	September 24, 2000	Greenville, U.S.	Clay	(United States) Kristy Blumberg	(Belarus) Evgenia Subbotina (Australia) Nicole Kriz	2–6, 2–6
Winner	1.	March 18, 2001	Monterrey, Mexico	Clay	(Netherlands) Anousjka van Exel	(Austria) Bianca Kamper (Austria) Isabella Mitterlehner	0–6, 6–2, 6–4
Runner-up	4.	July 29, 2001	Vancouver, Canada	Hard	(United States) Annica Cooper	(Japan) Kaori Aoyama (Japan) Miho Saeki	7–5, 3–6, 6–7
Runner-up	5.	January 26, 2003	Fullerton, United States	Hard	(Netherlands) Anousjka van Exel	(United States) Bethanie Mattek-Sands (United States) Shenay Perry	3–6, 2–6
Runner-up	6.	November 2, 2003	Dalby, Australia	Hard	(Netherlands) Anousjka van Exel	(Australia) Casey Dellacqua (Australia) Evie Dominikovic	7–6^{(6)}, 2–6, 1–6
