= Noam Okun =

Israeli tennis player

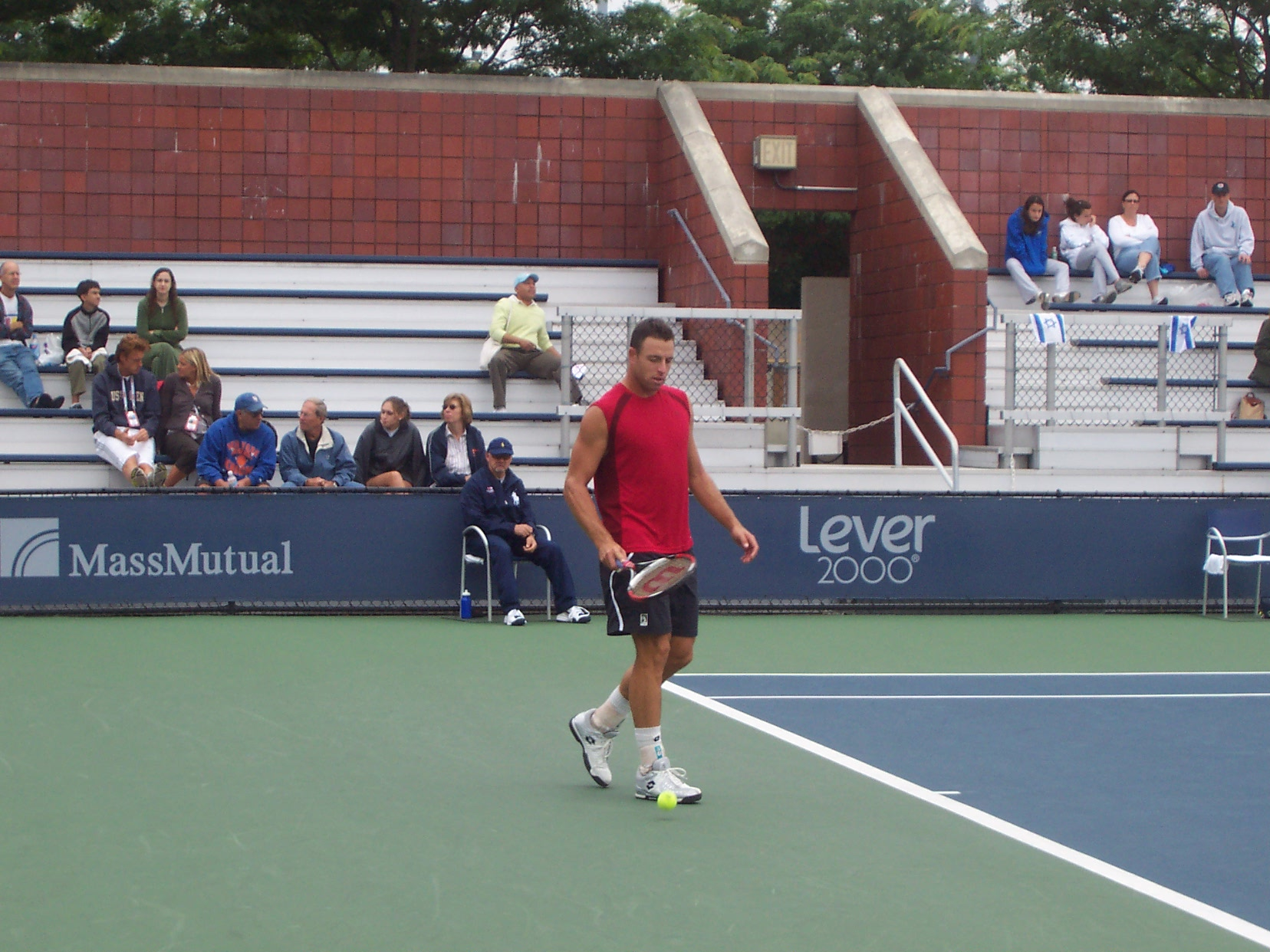
- Native name: נעם אוקון
- Country (sports): Israel
- Residence: Haifa, Israel
- Born: 16 April 1978 (age 47); Haifa, Israel
- Height: 1.85 m (6 ft 1 in)
- Turned pro: 1996
- Retired: 2015
- Plays: Right-handed (one-handed backhand)
- Coach: Shimon Rapaport
- Prize money: $784,555

Singles
- Career record: 36–59
- Career titles: 0
- Highest ranking: No. 95 (22 April 2002)

Grand Slam singles results
- Australian Open: 1R (2000, 2002)
- French Open: Q3 (2005)
- Wimbledon: 1R (2002, 2005)
- US Open: 2R (2002, 2006)

Doubles
- Career record: 1–5
- Career titles: 0
- Highest ranking: No. 162 (6 July 2009)

Grand Slam doubles results
- Wimbledon: Q1 (2003, 2005)
- Last updated on: 8 June 2021.

Noam Okun (Hebrew: נעם אוקון; born 16 April 1978) is an Israeli retired professional tennis player.

He reached a career-high singles ranking of World No. 95 in April 2002. Okun won several challenger tournaments in his career, and was a consistent competitor on the ATP tour, often qualifying for Grand Slam events.

He, Harel Levy, and Dudi Sela were Israel's top singles players for a number of years. Okun trained at the Israel Tennis Centers.

== Early life ==
Okun was born in Haifa, Israel. His parents are Igor (who works for Israeli Electric Company) and Galit (an assistant to an orthopedic doctor), and he is Jewish.

== Tennis career ==
Okun began playing tennis at age nine, and was selected to be part of the Israeli Tennis Federation program after a short course at school.

He turned pro in 1999, at the age of 21.

In 2000, Okun qualified for the Australian Open, where he lost to hometown favorite Mark Philippoussis in a five-set thriller, 4–6, 2–6, 6–2, 6–3, 2–6. This was Okun's grand slam debut.

In March 2002, Okun upset Albert Portas of Spain, ranked # 26 in the world, 7–6^{(4)}, 6–4, in Scottsdale. In July 2002 he upset Sjeng Schalken of the Netherlands, ranked # 23 in the world, 7–6^{(5)}, 7–6^{(4)}, in Los Angeles. Okun qualified into the 2002 US Open, and lost to world # 1 and defending champion Lleyton Hewitt of Australia, 6–7^{(7)}, 4–6, 1–6 in the second round.

In August 2003 Okun upset Martin Verkerk of the Netherlands, ranked # 15 in the world, 3–6, 6–3, 6–1, in Cincinnati.

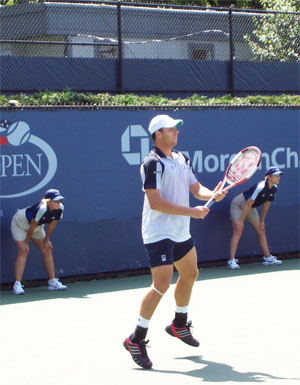
Noam Okun at 2004 U.S. Open

In August 2004, Okun won his first title in Binghamton, New York, beating Danai Udomchoke 6–3, 4–6, 6–1 for the title.

In June 2005, Okun qualified for Wimbledon, and lost to Gaël Monfils 6–3, 4–6, 4–6, 6–7^{(14)} in the first round. In September 2005, Okun qualified for the US Open and lost to Mariano Puerta 6–7^{(4)}, 7–6^{(3)}, 4–6, 0–6 in the first round.

In September 2006, Okun qualified for the US Open, and beat Potito Starace 6–2, 6–0, 4–6, 6–2 in the first round. Okun went down to Łukasz Kubot in the second round, 6–7^{(7)}, 4–6, 6–2, 6–2, 4–6.

In July 2007, Okun won his second challenger title in Winnetka, Illinois, beating South Africa's Kevin Anderson 6–4, 6–3 in the final.

In February 2009 he won an Israel F2 tournament, and lost in the finals of an Israel F3 tournament to Harel Levy, by walkover. In August and September 2009, he won three tournaments—an Israel F4, F5 and F6 tournament.

In March 2015, he played in an Israel F3 tournament in Ramat HaSharon, Israel, and lost in the finals to Isak Arvidsson of Sweden.

== ATP Challenger and ITF Futures finals ==
=== Singles: 18 (10–8) ===
Legend ATP Challenger (5–3) ITF Futures (5–5)	Finals by surface Hard (9–6) Clay (1–1) Grass (0–0) Carpet (0–1)

Result	W–L	Date	Tournament	Tier	Surface	Opponent	Score
Loss	0–1	Jun 1998	Ireland F1, Dublin	Futures	Carpet	(Australia) Michael Hill	6–4, 4–6, 3–6
Loss	0–2	Jun 1998	Greece F5, Athens	Futures	Clay	(Israel) Lior Mor	4–6, 1–6
Loss	0–3	Apr 1999	Uzbekistan F2, Namangan	Futures	Hard	(Uzbekistan) Oleg Ogorodov	3–6, 6–2, 3–6
Win	1–3	Jun 1999	Poland F1, Kraków	Futures	Clay	(Poland) Bartlomiej Dabrowski	6–1, 7–6
Loss	1–4	Oct 1999	Tel Aviv, Israel	Challenger	Hard	(Czech Republic) Ctislav Doseděl	6–7, 3–6
Loss	1–5	Feb 2001	Chandigarh, India	Challenger	Hard	(Netherlands) Dennis Van Scheppingen	3–6, 5–7
Win	2–5	May 2001	Jerusalem, Israel	Challenger	Hard	(France) Michaël Llodra	6–4, 6–1
Win	3–5	Jun 2001	Andorra la Vella, Andorra	Challenger	Hard	(Germany) Christian Vinck	6–2, 6–4
Win	4–5	Nov 2001	Tyler, United States	Challenger	Hard	(United States) Vince Spadea	7–5, 6–2
Win	5–5	Aug 2004	Binghamton, United States	Challenger	Hard	(Thailand) Danai Udomchoke	6–3, 4–6, 6–1
Loss	5–6	Sep 2006	Lubbock, United States	Challenger	Hard	(United States) Sam Querrey	1–6, 4–6
Win	6–6	Jul 2007	Winnetka, United States	Challenger	Hard	(South Africa) Kevin Anderson	6–4, 6–3
Win	7–6	Feb 2009	Israel F2, Eilat	Futures	Hard	(Israel) Harel Levy	6–4, 6–4
Loss	7–7	Feb 2009	Israel F3, Eilat	Futures	Hard	(Israel) Harel Levy	walkover
Win	8–7	Aug 2009	Israel F4, Ramat HaSharon	Futures	Hard	(New Zealand) Mikal Statham	6–2, 6–1
Win	9–7	Sep 2009	Israel F5, Ramat HaSharon	Futures	Hard	(Slovakia) Miloslav Mečíř	6–3, 6–2
Win	10–7	Sep 2009	Israel F6, Ramat HaSharon	Futures	Hard	(New Zealand) Marcus Daniell	7–6^{(7–4)}, 6–2
Loss	10–8	Mar 2015	Israel F3, Ramat HaSharon	Futures	Hard	(Sweden) Isak Arvidsson	6–4, 3–6, 4–6

=== Doubles: 22 (11–11) ===
Legend ATP Challenger (9–7) ITF Futures (2–4)	Finals by surface Hard (9–11) Clay (1–0) Grass (0–0) Carpet (1–0)

Result	W–L	Date	Tournament	Tier	Surface	Partner	Opponents	Score
Win	1–0	Jan 1998	India F1, New Delhi	Futures	Hard	(Israel) Jonathan Erlich	(Israel) Lior Mor (United Kingdom) Jamie Delgado	6–7, 7–6, 7–6
Loss	1–1	Jan 1998	India F3, Indore	Futures	Hard	(Israel) Jonathan Erlich	(Lebanon) Ali Hamadeh (United States) Andrew Rueb	6–7, 4–6
Loss	1–2	Oct 1998	Tel Aviv, Israel	Challenger	Hard	(Israel) Nir Welgreen	(Czech Republic) Radek Štěpánek (Czech Republic) Michal Tabara	6–7, 3–6
Win	2–2	Dec 1998	Ahmedabad, India	Challenger	Hard	(Israel) Nir Welgreen	(Israel) Noam Behr (Israel) Eyal Ran	3–6, 6–0, 6–4
Win	3–2	Sep 1999	Budapest, Hungary	Challenger	Clay	(Israel) Harel Levy	(Czech Republic) Daniel Fiala (Czech Republic) Leoš Friedl	6–4, 4–6, 6–2
Win	4–2	Jan 2001	São Paulo, Brazil	Challenger	Hard	(Brazil) André Sá	(France) Cedric Kauffmann (Brazil) Flávio Saretta	6–4, 1–6, 6–4
Win	5–2	Mar 2001	Kyoto, Japan	Challenger	Carpet	(Israel) Noam Behr	(United States) Kelly Gullett (United States) Brandon Hawk	6–3, 7–5
Win	6–2	Mar 2001	Hamilton, New Zealand	Challenger	Hard	(Israel) Noam Behr	(Finland) Tuomas Ketola (Italy) Filippo Messori	7–6^{(7–4)}, 6–4
Loss	6–3	May 2001	Jerusalem, Israel	Challenger	Hard	(Israel) Noam Behr	(Israel) Jonathan Erlich (France) Michaël Llodra	5–7, 6–4, 6–7^{(2–7)}
Win	7–3	Jul 2003	Córdoba, Spain	Challenger	Hard	(United States) Brandon Coupe	(Spain) Juan Ignacio Carrasco (Spain) Albert Portas	6–4, 1–6, 6–4
Win	8–3	Jun 2004	Tallahassee, United States	Challenger	Hard	(United States) Matías Boeker	(Australia) Mark Hlawaty (Australia) Brad Weston	6–7^{(3–7)}, 6–3, 6–4
Loss	8–4	Nov 2004	Bratislava, Slovakia	Challenger	Hard	(Israel) Jonathan Erlich	(Sweden) Simon Aspelin (United States) Graydon Oliver	6–7^{(5–7)}, 3–6
Loss	8–5	Jul 2005	Aptos, United States	Challenger	Hard	(Israel) Harel Levy	(Australia) Nathan Healey (United States) Eric Taino	5–7, 6–7^{(4–7)}
Win	9–5	Sep 2005	Istanbul, Turkey	Challenger	Hard	(Israel) Harel Levy	(Czech Republic) David Škoch (Czech Republic) Martin Štěpánek	6–4, 7–5
Loss	9–6	Jan 2007	Durban, South Africa	Challenger	Hard	(Switzerland) Stéphane Bohli	(South Africa) Rik de Voest (Germany) Dominik Meffert	4–6, 2–6
Loss	9–7	May 2007	Lanzarote, Spain	Challenger	Hard	(Israel) Dudi Sela	(South Africa) Rik de Voest (Australia) Luke Bourgeois	3–6, 1–6
Win	10–7	Jul 2008	Aptos, United States	Challenger	Hard	(Israel) Amir Weintraub	(United States) Todd Widom (United States) Michael Yani	6–2, 6–1
Loss	10–8	Sep 2008	Donetsk, Ukraine	Challenger	Hard	(Israel) Harel Levy	(Belgium) Xavier Malisse (Belgium) Dick Norman	6–4, 1–6, [11–13]
Win	11–8	Feb 2009	Israel F2, Eilat	Futures	Hard	(Israel) Harel Levy	(Netherlands) Tim Van Terheijden (Estonia) Jürgen Zopp	6–3, 6–0
Loss	11–9	May 2012	Israel F8, Ramat HaSharon	Futures	Hard	(Israel) Noam Behr	(Chinese Taipei) Ti Chen (New Zealand) Marcus Daniell	6–7^{(1–7)} ret.
Loss	11–10	May 2012	Israel F9, Ramat HaSharon	Futures	Hard	(Israel) Aviv Ben Shabat	(Chinese Taipei) Ti Chen (New Zealand) Marcus Daniell	0–6, 2–6
Loss	11–11	Oct 2015	Israel F14, Ramat HaSharon	Futures	Hard	(Israel) Noam Behr	(Hungary) Gabor Borsos (Hungary) Ádám Kellner	4–6, 6–7^{(7–9)}

== Performance timeline ==
Key
W	F	SF	QF	#R	RR	Q#	DNQ	A	NH

(W) winner; (F) finalist; (SF) semifinalist; (QF) quarterfinalist; (#R) rounds 4, 3, 2, 1; (RR) round-robin stage; (Q#) qualification round; (DNQ) did not qualify; (A) absent; (NH) not held; (SR) strike rate (events won / competed); (W–L) win–loss record.

=== Singles ===
Tournament	1999	2000	2001	2002	2003	2004	2005	2006	2007	2008	2009	2010	SR	W–L	Win %
Grand Slam tournaments
Australian Open	A	1R	Q3	1R	Q2	Q2	Q2	Q1	Q1	Q2	A	Q2	0 / 2	0–2	0%
French Open	Q1	A	Q2	A	Q2	Q1	Q3	Q2	Q1	Q2	A	A	0 / 0	0–0	–
Wimbledon	A	A	Q2	1R	Q3	A	1R	Q3	Q1	A	A	Q1	0 / 2	0–2	0%
US Open	Q3	A	Q3	2R	Q2	Q2	Q3	2R	Q1	A	A	Q3	0 / 2	2–2	50%
Win–loss	0–0	0–1	0–0	1–3	0–0	0–0	0–1	1–1	0–0	0–0	0–0	0–0	0 / 6	2–6	25%
ATP Tour Masters 1000
Indian Wells Masters	A	A	A	A	A	A	Q2	A	A	A	A	A	0 / 0	0–0	–
Miami Open	A	A	A	Q2	A	A	Q1	A	A	A	A	A	0 / 0	0–0	–
Canada Masters	A	A	A	Q2	Q1	Q2	1R	A	A	A	A	A	0 / 1	0–1	0%
Cincinnati Masters	A	A	A	1R	2R	Q2	A	A	A	A	A	A	0 / 2	1–2	33%
Shanghai Masters	Not Held										Q2	A	0 / 0	0–0	–
Win–loss	0–0	0–0	0–0	0–1	1–1	0–0	0–1	0–0	0–0	0–0	0–0	0–0	0 / 3	1–3	25%

=== Davis Cup ===
Okun was a major force on the Israeli Davis Cup team, playing for it in 1999 and since 2001, going 17–16, and winning both of his matches in Israel's 2006 3–2 victory over Great Britain. His Davis Cup record also includes big wins in live rubbers over Wayne Ferreira, Jarkko Nieminen, and Andreas Seppi.

== See also ==
- List of select Jewish tennis players
