= 2005 Rogers Masters – Singles =

Singles
- 2005 Rogers Masters

Final
- Champion: (Spain) Rafael Nadal
- Runner-up: (United States) Andre Agassi
- Score: 6–3, 4–6, 6–2

Details
- Draw: 64
- Seeds: 16

Events
Singles	Doubles
- Rogers Masters

Rafael Nadal defeated Andre Agassi in the final, 6–3, 4–6, 6–2 to win the men's singles tennis title at the 2005 Canadian Open. It was his third Masters title and first career title on hardcourts.

Roger Federer was the reigning champion, but did not participate this year.

== Seeds ==
1. (Spain) Rafael Nadal (champion)
2. (Australia) Lleyton Hewitt (first round, retired due to illness)
3. (United States) Andy Roddick (first round)
4. (United States) Andre Agassi (final)
5. (Russia) Nikolay Davydenko (third round)
6. (Argentina) Gastón Gaudio (quarterfinals)
7. (Argentina) Guillermo Coria (first round)
8. (Argentina) ~~Mariano Puerta (quarterfinals)~~
9. (Argentina) David Nalbandian (second round)
10. (United Kingdom) Tim Henman (first round)
11. (Spain) Tommy Robredo (third round)
12. (Sweden) Thomas Johansson (second round)
13. (Croatia) Ivan Ljubičić (first round)
14. (Czech Republic) Radek Štěpánek (first round)
15. (France) Richard Gasquet (second round)
16. (Chile) Fernando González (first round)

== Draw ==
Key

- Q = Qualifier
- WC = Wild card
- LL = Lucky loser
- Alt = Alternate
- ITF = ITF entry
- PR = Protected ranking
- SR = Special ranking
- SE = Special exempt
- JE = Junior exempt
- JR = Junior Accelerator Programme entrant
- CO = College Accelerator Programme entrant
- NG = Next Gen Accelerator Program entrant
- w/o = Walkover
- r = Retired
- d = Defaulted

=== Finals ===
Quarterfinals
1	(Spain) Rafael Nadal	6	6
8	(Argentina) ~~Mariano Puerta~~	3	1
(France) Paul-Henri Mathieu	6	6
(Slovakia) Karol Beck	1	2
6	(Argentina) Gastón Gaudio	3	4
4	(United States) Andre Agassi	6	6
(Slovakia) Dominik Hrbatý	3	4
(United Kingdom) Greg Rusedski	6	6

Semifinals
1	(Spain) Rafael Nadal	6	7
(France) Paul-Henri Mathieu	4	5
4	(United States) Andre Agassi	6	6
(United Kingdom) Greg Rusedski	4	4

Final
1	(Spain) Rafael Nadal	6	4	6
4	(United States) Andre Agassi	3	6	2

=== Top half ===
==== Section 1 ====
First round
1	(Spain) R Nadal	6	6^{0}	6
(Spain) C Moyá	3	7	3
(Brazil) R Mello	6	6
WC	(Canada) P Bester	4	2
(Thailand) P Srichaphan	6^{1}	6	2
(France) S Grosjean	7	3	6
(Russia) M Youzhny	3	6^{3}
15	(France) R Gasquet	6	7
12	(Sweden) T Johansson	6	7
(Croatia) I Karlović	1	5
(Belgium) X Malisse	6	6
WC	(Canada) F Dancevic	2	2
(Belgium) C Rochus	1	5
(Romania) A Pavel	6	7
(Peru) L Horna	6^{7}	6^{3}
8	(Argentina) ~~M Puerta~~	7	7

Second round
1	(Spain) R Nadal	6	6
(Brazil) R Mello	1	2
(France) S Grosjean	7	6
15	(France) R Gasquet	6^{5}	3
12	(Sweden) T Johansson	5	6^{4}
(Belgium) X Malisse	7	7
(Romania) A Pavel	6	3	4
8	(Argentina) ~~M Puerta~~	3	6	6

Third round
1	(Spain) R Nadal	6	6
(France) S Grosjean	4	4
(Belgium) X Malisse	2	4
8	(Argentina) ~~M Puerta~~	6	6

Quarterfinals
1	(Spain) R Nadal	6	6
8	(Argentina) ~~M Puerta~~	3	1

==== Section 2 ====
First round
3	(United States) A Roddick	5	3
(France) PH Mathieu	7	6
Q	(France) A Clément	2	6	6
(Argentina) J Acasuso	6	3	3
(Belgium) O Rochus	6	6
Q	(France) N Mahut	3	4
(Sweden) R Söderling	6	6
14	(Czech Republic) R Štěpánek	3	4
9	(Argentina) D Nalbandian	6	6
(Argentina) JI Chela	4	1
Q	(Israel) N Okun	3	2
(Slovakia) K Beck	6	6
(Austria) J Melzer	1	3
(Czech Republic) T Berdych	6	6
WC	(Canada) F Niemeyer	2	1
5	(Russia) N Davydenko	6	6

Second round
(France) PH Mathieu	6	3	6
Q	(France) A Clément	3	6	3
(Belgium) O Rochus	6	6^{2}	5
(Sweden) R Söderling	2	7	2^{r}
9	(Argentina) D Nalbandian	6^{1}	7	3
(Slovakia) K Beck	7	6^{3}	6
(Czech Republic) T Berdych	7	1	3
5	(Russia) N Davydenko	5	6	6

Third round
(France) PH Mathieu	6	6
(Belgium) O Rochus	1	2
(Slovakia) K Beck	6	3	7
5	(Russia) N Davydenko	4	6	6^{4}

Quarterfinals
(France) PH Mathieu	6	6
(Slovakia) K Beck	1	2

=== Bottom half ===
==== Section 3 ====
First round
6	(Argentina) G Gaudio	1	7	7
Q	(Italy) D Sanguinetti	6	6^{5}	5
WC	(Canada) R Steckley	7	4	3
(Denmark) K Carlsen	5	6	6
(Spain) F López	6^{3}	3
PR	(Morocco) Y El Aynaoui	7	6
Q	(United States) K Kim	5	6	1
11	(Spain) T Robredo	7	3	6
13	(Croatia) I Ljubičić	6	5	3
(United States) T Dent	1	7	6
(Germany) N Kiefer	6	6
(Chile) N Massú	3	2
Q	(Sweden) J Björkman	6	6
(United States) V Spadea	3	2
(Spain) A Martín	4	2
4	(United States) A Agassi	6	6

Second round
6	(Argentina) G Gaudio	3	6	7
(Denmark) K Carlsen	6	2	5
PR	(Morocco) Y El Aynaoui	6^{4}	6^{6}
11	(Spain) T Robredo	7	7
(United States) T Dent	4	4
(Germany) N Kiefer	6	6
Q	(Sweden) J Björkman	1	6	2
4	(United States) A Agassi	6	3	6

Third round
6	(Argentina) G Gaudio	6	7
11	(Spain) T Robredo	3	6^{0}
(Germany) N Kiefer	4	2
4	(United States) A Agassi	6	6

Quarterfinals
6	(Argentina) G Gaudio	3	4
4	(United States) A Agassi	6	6

==== Section 4 ====
First round
7	(Argentina) G Coria	3	2
(Spain) JC Ferrero	6	6
(Spain) D Ferrer	3	6	6
(France) F Santoro	6	1	2
(Czech Republic) J Novák	6	6^{1}	6
(Russia) I Andreev	4	7	1
(Slovakia) D Hrbatý	3	7	6
10	(United Kingdom) T Henman	6	5	1
16	(Chile) F González	6^{5}	4
(Belarus) M Mirnyi	7	6
Q	(Switzerland) S Wawrinka	7	2	3
(United Kingdom) G Rusedski	6^{5}	6	6
(France) C Saulnier	3	6^{8}
(Croatia) M Ančić	6	7
Q	(France) F Serra	4
2	(Australia) L Hewitt	3	r

Second round
(Spain) JC Ferrero	7	4	6
(Spain) D Ferrer	5	6	3
(Czech Republic) J Novák	3	6	0
(Slovakia) D Hrbatý	6	4	6
(Belarus) M Mirnyi	6	4	6^{2}
(United Kingdom) G Rusedski	4	6	7
(Croatia) M Ančić	6	3	7
Q	(France) F Serra	3	6	5

Third round
(Spain) JC Ferrero	4	2
(Slovakia) D Hrbatý	6	6
(United Kingdom) G Rusedski	6	3	6
(Croatia) M Ančić	2	6	2

Quarterfinals
(Slovakia) D Hrbatý	3	4
(United Kingdom) G Rusedski	6	6

== Qualifying ==
=== Seeds ===
1. (Czech Republic) Tomáš Zíb (qualifying competition)
2. (Italy) Davide Sanguinetti (qualified)
3. (Switzerland) Stanislas Wawrinka (qualified)
4. (Luxembourg) Gilles Müller (qualifying competition)
5. (Italy) Andreas Seppi (first round)
6. (France) Michaël Llodra (first round)
7. (Australia) Wayne Arthurs (first round)
8. (United States) Kevin Kim (qualified)
9. (Ecuador) Nicolás Lapentti (qualifying competition)
10. (France) Florent Serra (qualified)
11. (Czech Republic) Jan Hernych (first round)
12. (Serbia and Montenegro) Novak Djokovic (qualifying competition)
13. (United States) Justin Gimelstob (first round)
14. (Sweden) Jonas Björkman (qualified)
15. (Monaco) Jean-Rene Lisnard (first round)
16. (France) Arnaud Clément (qualified)

=== Qualifiers ===
1. (France) Arnaud Clément
2. (Italy) Davide Sanguinetti
3. (Switzerland) Stanislas Wawrinka
4. (Sweden) Jonas Björkman
5. (Israel) Noam Okun
6. (France) Nicolas Mahut
7. (France) Florent Serra
8. (United States) Kevin Kim

=== Draw ===
==== First qualifier ====
First round
1	(Czech Republic) Tomáš Zíb	1	7	7^{7}
(Australia) Peter Luczak	6	5	6^{4}
(France) Sébastien de Chaunac	4	4
16	(France) Arnaud Clément	6	6

Qualifying competition
1	(Czech Republic) Tomáš Zíb	6	6^{6}	3
16	(France) Arnaud Clément	3	7^{8}	6

==== Second qualifier ====
First round
2	(Italy) Davide Sanguinetti	7^{7}	7^{7}
(Ecuador) Giovanni Lapentti	6^{2}	6^{4}
WC	(Canada) Pierre-Ludovic Duclos	1	2
12	(Serbia and Montenegro) Novak Djokovic	6	6

Qualifying competition
2	(Italy) Davide Sanguinetti	6	4	6
12	(Serbia and Montenegro) Novak Djokovic	4	6	4

==== Third qualifier ====
First round
3	(Switzerland) Stanislas Wawrinka	7^{7}	6^{5}	6
(France) Julien Benneteau	6^{4}	7^{7}	3
(South Africa) Wesley Moodie	6^{6}	7^{7}	6
13	(United States) Justin Gimelstob	7^{8}	6^{4}	4

Qualifying competition
3	(Switzerland) Stanislas Wawrinka	7	7^{8}
(South Africa) Wesley Moodie	5	6^{6}

==== Fourth qualifier ====
First round
4	(Luxembourg) Gilles Müller	6	6
(France) Gregory Carraz	3	4
WC	(Canada) Peter Polansky	2	1
14	(Sweden) Jonas Björkman	6	6

Qualifying competition
4	(Luxembourg) Gilles Müller	7^{8}	6^{0}	2
14	(Sweden) Jonas Björkman	6^{6}	7^{7}	6

==== Fifth qualifier ====
First round
5	(Italy) Andreas Seppi	6^{4}	7	3
(Switzerland) Ivo Heuberger	7^{7}	5	6
(Israel) Noam Okun	6	6
11	(Czech Republic) Jan Hernych	3	4

Qualifying competition
(Switzerland) Ivo Heuberger	1	0
(Israel) Noam Okun	6	6

==== Sixth qualifier ====
First round
6	(France) Michaël Llodra	0^{r}
(United States) Glenn Weiner	5
(France) Nicolas Mahut	6
15	(Monaco) Jean-Rene Lisnard	0^{r}

Qualifying competition
(United States) Glenn Weiner	4	3
(France) Nicolas Mahut	6	6

==== Seventh qualifier ====
First round
6	(Australia) Wayne Arthurs	3	6^{4}
(Japan) Takao Suzuki	6	7^{7}
WC	(Canada) Erik Chvojka	5	2
10	(France) Florent Serra	7	6

Qualifying competition
(Japan) Takao Suzuki	6^{5}	7^{8}	2
10	(France) Florent Serra	7^{7}	6^{6}	6

==== Eighth qualifier ====
First round
8	(United States) Kevin Kim	6	6
(France) Gilles Simon	4	4
WC	(United States) David Martin	3	2
9	(Ecuador) Nicolás Lapentti	6	6

Qualifying competition
8	(United States) Kevin Kim	7^{7}	6
9	(Ecuador) Nicolás Lapentti	6^{2}	4
