= Thomas Blake (tennis) =

American tennis player

- Country (sports): United States
- Residence: Tampa, Florida, U.S.
- Born: December 29, 1976 (age 49) Yonkers, New York, U.S.
- Turned pro: 1999
- Plays: Right-handed
- Prize money: US$141,621

Singles
- Career record: 2–5 (at ATP Tour-level, Grand Slam-level, and in Davis Cup)
- Career titles: 0
- Highest ranking: No. 264 (28 October 2002)

Grand Slam singles results
- Australian Open: Q2 (2003)
- Wimbledon: Q1 (2003)
- US Open: Q1 (1998, 1999, 2003)

Doubles
- Career record: 10–22 (at ATP Tour-level, Grand Slam-level, and in Davis Cup)
- Career titles: 0
- Highest ranking: No. 141 (25 November 2002)

Grand Slam doubles results
- Wimbledon: Q2 (2003)
- US Open: 1R (1999, 2002)

Thomas Blake, Jr. (born December 29, 1976) is an American former professional tennis player.
