= Shenay Perry =

American tennis player (born 1984)

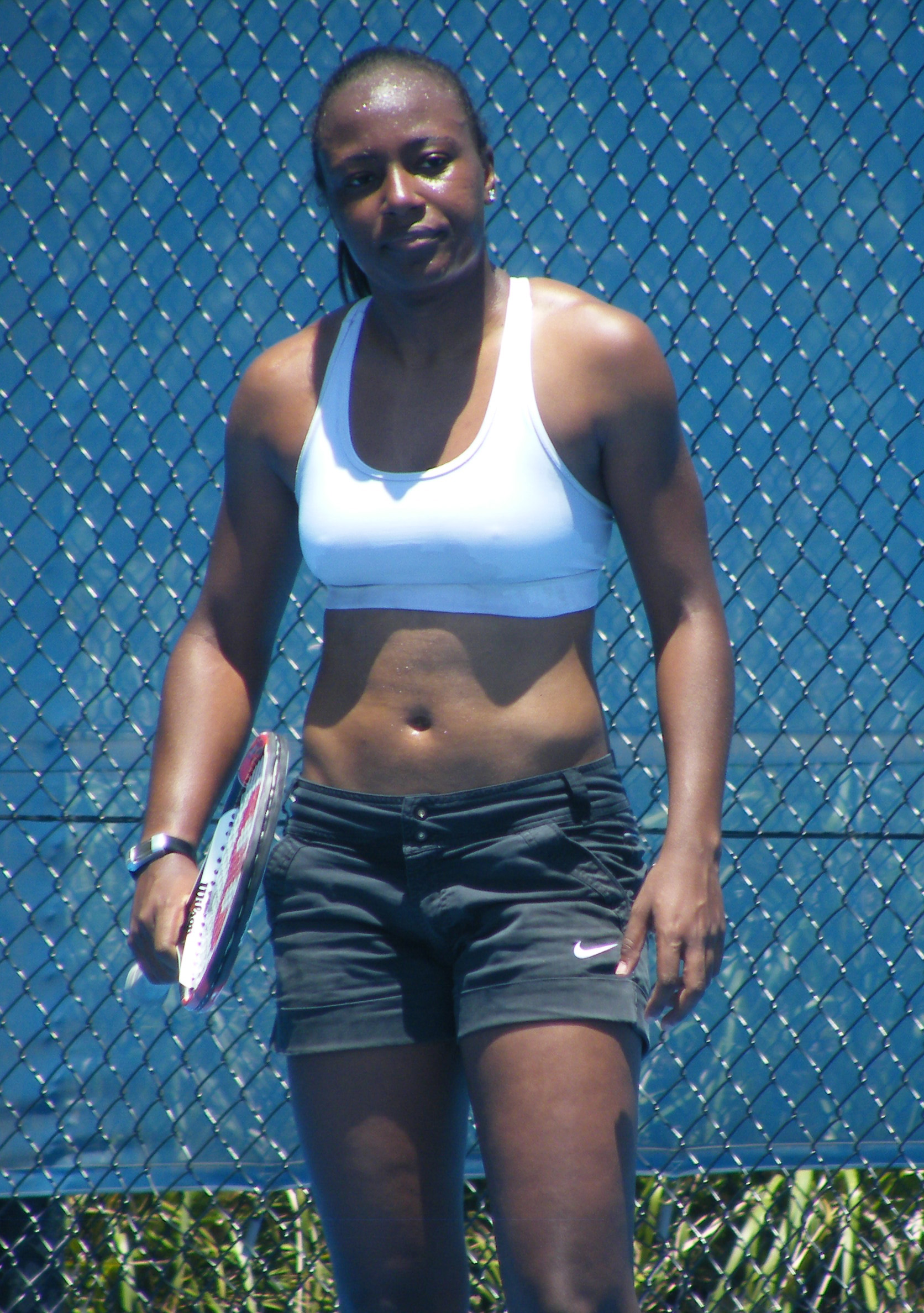
- Country (sports): United States
- Residence: Coral Springs, Florida
- Born: July 6, 1984 (age 41) Washington, D.C.
- Height: 1.70 m (5 ft 7 in)
- Turned pro: January 1, 2000
- Retired: September 2010
- Plays: Right-handed (one-handed backhand)
- Prize money: $906,548

Singles
- Career record: 239–165
- Career titles: 9 ITF
- Highest ranking: No. 40 (August 28, 2006)

Grand Slam singles results
- Australian Open: 1R (2004, 2006, 2007, 2010)
- French Open: 3R (2006)
- Wimbledon: 4R (2006)
- US Open: 2R (2005, 2009)

Doubles
- Career record: 93–81
- Career titles: 7 ITF
- Highest ranking: No. 97 (December 8, 2003)

Grand Slam doubles results
- Australian Open: 2R (2007, 2010)
- French Open: 2R (2007)
- Wimbledon: 1R (2004, 2006)
- US Open: 2R (2003)

Shenay Perry (born July 6, 1984) is a retired tennis player from the U.S. She is the current coach of professional tennis player Kristie Ahn.

Perry's career-high singles ranking of No. 40 she reached on August 28, 2006. Her career-high doubles ranking of No. 97, she achieved on December 8, 2003. She won nine singles and seven doubles ITF titles in her career.

On June 9, 2004, as a U.S. qualifier ranked No. 88, Perry upset 5th-ranked Jelena Dokic at the DFS grass-court tournament, winning 6–4, 7–6 (4). Perry was billed the "last American left standing" in either singles draw at the 2006 Wimbledon Championships.

She retired from professional tennis in September 2010.

== ITF Circuit finals ==
=== Singles: 10 (9 titles, 1 runner-up) ===
Legend $100,000 tournaments $75,000 tournaments $50,000 tournaments $25,000 tournaments $10,000 tournaments	Finals by surface Hard (8–1) Clay (1–0) Grass (0–0) Carpet (0–0)

Result	No.	Date	Tournament	Surface	Opponent	Score
Win	1.	2 March 2003	ITF St. Paul, United States	Hard (i)	(Venezuela) María Vento-Kabchi	6–2, 6–4
Win	2.	6 July 2003	ITF Los Gatos, United States	Hard	(United States) Amber Liu	6–0, 7–5
Loss	1.	3 August 2003	ITF Louisville, United States	Hard	(Puerto Rico) Kristina Brandi	6–3, 4–6, 4–6
Win	3.	4 October 2004	ITF Troy, United States	Hard	(Argentina) María Emilia Salerni	6–2, 6–2
Win	4.	24 October 2004	ITF Cary, United States	Hard	(United States) Kelly McCain	4–6, 6–4, 7–5
Win	5.	14 November 2004	ITF Pittsburgh, United States	Hard (i)	(Sweden) Sofia Arvidsson	6–2, 6–1
Win	6.	5 March 2006	ITF Las Vegas, United States	Hard	(Finland) Emma Laine	6–1, 6–4
Win	7.	19 October 2008	ITF Lawrenceville, United States	Hard	(United States) Julie Ditty	6–1, 6–3
Win	8.	26 April 2009	ITF Dothan, United States	Clay	Carly Gullickson	4–6, 6–1, 6–3
Win	9.	27 September 2009	ITF Albuquerque, United States	Hard	Barbora Strýcová	7–5, 6–2

=== Doubles: 13 (7 titles, 6 runner-ups) ===
Legend $100,000 tournaments $75,000 tournaments $50,000 tournaments $25,000 tournaments $10,000 tournaments	Finals by surface Hard (6–6) Clay (1–0) Grass (0–0) Carpet (0–0)

Result	No.	Date	Tournament	Surface	Partner	Opponents	Score
Win	1.	6 October 2001	ITF Aventura, United States	Clay	(United States) Milangela Morales	(Haiti) Neyssa Etienne (Russia) Ekaterina Afinogenova	w/o
Loss	1.	8 June 2002	ITF Hilton Head, United States	Hard	(United States) Milangela Morales	(Indonesia) Liza Andriyani (Indonesia) Wukirasih Sawondari	2–6, 1–6
Loss	2.	18 January 2003	ITF Boca Raton, United States	Hard	(Russia) Lioudmila Skavronskaia	(United States) Sandra Cacic (Canada) Sonya Jeyaseelan	5–7, 2–6
Win	2.	25 January 2003	ITF Fullerton, United States	Hard	(United States) Bethanie Mattek-Sands	(United States) Elizabeth Schmidt (Netherlands) Anousjka Van Exel	6–3, 6–2
Loss	3.	8 February 2003	ITF Midland, United States	Hard	(United States) Bethanie Mattek-Sands	(United States) Teryn Ashley (United States) Abigail Spears	1–6, 6–4, 4–6
Loss	4.	5 July 2003	ITF Los Gatos, United States	Hard	(United States) Tanner Cochran	(Japan) Shiho Hisamatsu (Japan) Yuka Yoshida	4–6, 6–3, 2–6
Loss	5.	2 August 2003	ITF Louisville, United States	Hard	(United States) Tanner Cochran	(United States) Julie Ditty (Australia) Lisa McShea	6–7^{(4)}, 7–6^{(6)}, 3–6
Win	3.	4 October 2003	ITF Troy, United States	Hard	(United States) Bethanie Mattek-Sands	(United States) Lindsay Lee-Waters (Slovenia) Petra Rampre	6–2, 2–6, 6–4
Win	4.	15 November 2003	ITF Eugene, United States	Hard	(United States) Teryn Ashley	(Russia) Alina Jidkova (Belarus) Tatiana Poutchek	3–6, 6–2, 6–4
Loss	6.	2 October 2004	ITF Troy, United States	Hard	(United States) Bethanie Mattek-Sands	(United States) Teryn Ashley (United States) Laura Granville	6–2, 0–3 ret.
Win	5.	18 January 2008	ITF Surprise, United States	Hard	(United States) Carly Gullickson	(Brazil) Maria Fernanda Alves (Argentina) Betina Jozami	6–4, 7–5
Win	6.	2 February 2008	ITF La Quinta, United States	Hard	(United States) Carly Gullickson	(Germany) Angelika Bachmann (United States) Tetiana Luzhanska	6–1, 6–4
Win	7.	9 February 2008	ITF Midland, United States	Hard (i)	(United States) Ashley Harkleroad	(South Africa) Surina De Beer (Japan) Rika Fujiwara	3–6, 6–4, [10–6]
