= 2003 Wimbledon Championships – Boys' doubles =

Boys' doubles
- 2003 Wimbledon Championships

Final
- Champions: (Romania) Florin Mergea (Romania) Horia Tecău
- Runners-up: (Australia) Adam Feeney (Australia) Chris Guccione
- Score: 7–6^{(7–4)}, 7–5

Events
Singles	men	women		boys	girls
Doubles	men	women	mixed	boys	girls
WC Singles	men	women	quad
WC Doubles	men	women	quad
Legends	men	women	seniors
← 2002 ·	Wimbledon Championships	· 2004 →

Florin Mergea and Horia Tecău successfully defended their title, defeating Adam Feeney and Chris Guccione in the final, 7–6^{(7–4)}, 7–5 to win the boys' doubles tennis title at the 2003 Wimbledon Championships.

== Seeds ==
1. (Romania) Florin Mergea / (Romania) Horia Tecău (champions)
2. (United States) Brian Baker / (United States) Phillip Simmonds (semifinals)
3. (United States) Brendan Evans / (United States) Scott Oudsema (quarterfinals)
4. (Hungary) György Balázs / (Israel) Dudi Sela (first round, retired)

== Draw ==
=== Key ===
- Q = Qualifier
- WC = Wild card
- LL = Lucky loser
- Alt = Alternate
- SE = Special exempt
- PR = Protected ranking
- ITF = ITF entry
- JE = Junior exempt
- w/o = Walkover
- r = Retired
- d = Defaulted
- SR = Special ranking

=== Draw ===
First round
1	(Romania) Florin Mergea (Romania) Horia Tecău	7^{7}	7^{7}
(Tunisia) Haythem Abid (South Africa) Fritz Wolmarans	6^{5}	6^{5}
(United States) Alex Kuznetsov (Germany) Mischa Zverev	6	6
WC	(United Kingdom) Ross Hutchins (United Kingdom) Guy Thomas	3	4
4	(Hungary) György Balázs (Israel) Dudi Sela	3^{r}
(Sweden) Pablo Figueroa (Mexico) Luis-Manuel Flores	0
(India) Somdev Devvarman (India) Karan Rastogi	0	5
(United Kingdom) Andy Murray (United Kingdom) Tom Rushby	6	7
(Australia) Adam Feeney (Australia) Chris Guccione	7	3	11
(Georgia (country)) Lado Chikhladze (Slovenia) Rok Jarc	5	6	9
(Portugal) Frederico Gil (United States) Chris Kwon	7	6^{6}	8
3	(United States) Brendan Evans (United States) Scott Oudsema	5	7^{8}	10
(Czech Republic) Tomáš Berdych (Ukraine) Sergiy Stakhovsky	6	6
(Netherlands) Jesse Huta Galung (Netherlands) Romano Tatuhey	3	4
(Germany) Daniel Müller (Germany) Sebastian Rieschick	6^{5}	2
2	(United States) Brian Baker (United States) Phillip Simmonds	7^{7}	6

Quarterfinals
1	(Romania) Florin Mergea (Romania) Horia Tecău	6	6
(United States) Alex Kuznetsov (Germany) Mischa Zverev	1	3
(Sweden) Pablo Figueroa (Mexico) Luis-Manuel Flores	2	3
(United Kingdom) Andy Murray (United Kingdom) Tom Rushby	6	6
(Australia) Adam Feeney (Australia) Chris Guccione	6	7^{7}
3	(United States) Brendan Evans (United States) Scott Oudsema	3	6^{1}
(Czech Republic) Tomáš Berdych (Ukraine) Sergiy Stakhovsky	4	6	5
2	(United States) Brian Baker (United States) Phillip Simmonds	6	3	7

Semifinals
1	(Romania) Florin Mergea (Romania) Horia Tecău	6	7
(United Kingdom) Andy Murray (United Kingdom) Tom Rushby	3	5
(Australia) Adam Feeney (Australia) Chris Guccione	6	6^{3}	6
2	(United States) Brian Baker (United States) Phillip Simmonds	4	7^{7}	3

Final
1	(Romania) Florin Mergea (Romania) Horia Tecău	7^{7}	7
(Australia) Adam Feeney (Australia) Chris Guccione	6^{4}	5
