= 2003 Wimbledon Championships – Men's singles =

Men's singles
- 2003 Wimbledon Championships

Final
- Champion: (Switzerland) Roger Federer
- Runner-up: (Australia) Mark Philippoussis
- Score: 7–6^{(7–5)}, 6–2, 7–6^{(7–3)}

Details
- Draw: 128 (16Q / 8WC)
- Seeds: 32

Events
Singles	men	women		boys	girls
Doubles	men	women	mixed	boys	girls
WC Singles	men	women	quad
WC Doubles	men	women	quad
Legends	men	women	seniors
- Wimbledon Championships

Roger Federer defeated Mark Philippoussis in the final, 7–6^{(7–5)}, 6–2, 7–6^{(7–3)} to win the gentlemen's singles tennis title at the 2003 Wimbledon Championships. It was his first major title, the first of a record eight gentlemen's singles titles at Wimbledon, and the first of 20 major men's singles titles overall.

By virtue of winning the 1998 Wimbledon Boys’ title, Federer became just the fourth man in the Open Era to win the Boys’ and Gentlemen’s Wimbledon Championships, joining Björn Borg, Pat Cash, and Stefan Edberg.

Lleyton Hewitt was the defending champion, but was defeated in the first round by Ivo Karlović. Hewitt was the first man in the Open Era to lose in the first round of his Wimbledon title defence.

With the losses of Hewitt, Andre Agassi and Juan Carlos Ferrero by the fourth round, a first-time major champion was guaranteed. This marked the first time in the Open Era that none of the quarterfinalists in a major had previously won a major singles title.

This tournament marked the major debut of future 22-time major champion, Olympic gold medalist, and world No. 1 Rafael Nadal (who was the youngest player in the draw at 17 years and 20 days of age); he lost to Paradorn Srichaphan in the third round. This tournament also marked the final major appearance of Olympic gold medalist Marc Rosset, who lost to Wesley Moodie in the first round. It was also notable for the absence of seven-time Wimbledon champion Pete Sampras, who had yet to announce his official retirement following his final match at the 2002 US Open.

== Seeds ==
1. (Australia) Lleyton Hewitt (first round)
2. (United States) Andre Agassi (fourth round)
3. (Spain) Juan Carlos Ferrero (fourth round)
4. (Switzerland) Roger Federer (champion)
5. (United States) Andy Roddick (semifinals)
6. (Argentina) David Nalbandian (fourth round)
7. (Argentina) Guillermo Coria (first round)
8. (Netherlands) Sjeng Schalken (quarterfinals)
9. (Germany) Rainer Schüttler (fourth round)
10. (United Kingdom) Tim Henman (quarterfinals)
11. (Czech Republic) Jiří Novák (third round)
12. (Thailand) Paradorn Srichaphan (fourth round)
13. (France) Sébastien Grosjean (semifinals)
14. (Belgium) Xavier Malisse (first round)
15. (France) Arnaud Clément (second round)
16. (Russia) Mikhail Youzhny (second round)
17. (Brazil) Gustavo Kuerten (second round)
18. (Russia) Marat Safin (withdrew)
19. (Chile) Fernando González (first round)
20. (Russia) Yevgeny Kafelnikov (first round)
21. (Netherlands) Martin Verkerk (first round)
22. (Spain) Félix Mantilla (first round)
23. (Argentina) Agustín Calleri (second round)
24. (Spain) Albert Costa (withdrew)
25. (Spain) Tommy Robredo (third round)
26. (United States) James Blake (second round)
27. (Morocco) Younes El Aynaoui (third round)
28. (South Africa) Wayne Ferreira (first round)
29. (Argentina) Gastón Gaudio (first round)
30. (Finland) Jarkko Nieminen (third round)
31. (United States) Vince Spadea (first round)
32. (Argentina) Juan Ignacio Chela (second round)
33. (Russia) Nikolay Davydenko (first round)
34. (Spain) Àlex Corretja (withdrew)
35. (Czech Republic) Radek Štěpánek (third round)

Click on the seed number of a player to go to their draw section.

Albert Costa and Marat Safin withdrew due to injury. They were replaced in the draw by the highest-ranked non-seeded players Nikolay Davydenko and Àlex Corretja, who became the #33 and #34 seeds respectively. Corretja subsequently withdrew for personal reasons and was replaced by the next highest non-seeded player Radek Štěpánek, who became the #35 seed.

== Draw ==
Key

- Q = Qualifier
- WC = Wild card
- LL = Lucky loser
- Alt = Alternate
- ITF = ITF entry
- PR = Protected ranking
- SR = Special ranking
- SE = Special exempt
- JE = Junior exempt
- JR = Junior Accelerator Programme entrant
- CO = College Accelerator Programme entrant
- NG = Next Gen Accelerator Program entrant
- w/o = Walkover
- r = Retired
- d = Defaulted

=== Finals ===
Quarterfinals
(Sweden) Jonas Björkman	4	2	4
5	(United States) Andy Roddick	6	6	6
4	(Switzerland) Roger Federer	6	6	6
8	(Netherlands) Sjeng Schalken	3	4	4
10	(United Kingdom) Tim Henman	6^{8}	6	3	4
13	(France) Sébastien Grosjean	7^{10}	3	6	6
PR	(Germany) Alexander Popp	6	6	3	3	6
(Australia) Mark Philippoussis	4	4	6	6	8

Semifinals
5	(United States) Andy Roddick	6^{6}	3	3
4	(Switzerland) Roger Federer	7^{8}	6	6
13	(France) Sébastien Grosjean	6^{3}	3	3
(Australia) Mark Philippoussis	7^{7}	6	6

Final
4	(Switzerland) Roger Federer	7^{7}	6	7^{7}
(Australia) Mark Philippoussis	6^{5}	2	6^{3}

=== Top half ===
==== Section 1 ====
First round
1	(Australia) L Hewitt	6	6^{5}	3	4
Q	(Croatia) I Karlović	1	7^{7}	6	6
Q	(Switzerland) I Heuberger	6^{8}	3	6	6^{2}
Q	(Australia) P Baccanello	7^{10}	6	3	7^{7}
(United States) T Dent	5	6	3	5
(Croatia) I Ljubičić	7	3	6	7
(Belarus) M Mirnyi	6	6	6
31	(United States) V Spadea	2	4	4
19	(Chile) F González	3	4	6^{6}
(Austria) J Melzer	6	6	7^{8}
Q	(Czech Republic) P Luxa	3	6^{6}	2
(Sweden) J Björkman	6	7^{8}	6
(Georgia (country)) I Labadze	2	2	4
(United States) J Gimelstob	6	6	6
(United States) R Ginepri	3	6	6^{2}	7^{7}	8
15	(France) A Clément	6	4	7^{7}	6^{3}	10

Second round
Q	(Croatia) I Karlović	6	7^{7}	5	6
Q	(Australia) P Baccanello	4	6^{3}	7	2
(Croatia) I Ljubičić	3	4	6	2
(Belarus) M Mirnyi	6	6	2	6
(Austria) J Melzer	4	2	6	3
(Sweden) J Björkman	6	6	2	6
(United States) J Gimelstob	2	6	6	6^{2}	6
15	(France) A Clément	6	3	4	7^{7}	1

Third round
Q	(Croatia) I Karlović	6^{5}	6	3	6^{4}
(Belarus) M Mirnyi	7^{7}	3	6	7^{7}
(Sweden) J Björkman	6	6	6
(United States) J Gimelstob	1	3	3

Fourth round
(Belarus) M Mirnyi	4	6	3	6^{4}
(Sweden) J Björkman	6	3	6	7^{7}

==== Section 2 ====
First round
12	(Thailand) P Srichaphan	6	6	4	3	6
(Slovakia) D Hrbatý	3	4	6	6	3
(France) O Mutis	4	0	6	7^{7}	6
(Argentina) F Squillari	6	6	4	6^{1}	3
(Spain) R Nadal	6	6	4	6
(Croatia) M Ančić	3	4	6	4
WC	(United Kingdom) L Childs	2	7^{7}	1	7^{7}	6
33	(Russia) N Davydenko	6	6^{2}	6	6^{5}	2
25	(Spain) T Robredo	3	6	7^{8}	6
(Argentina) J Acasuso	6	3	6^{6}	4
(United States) B Vahaly	2	6	6	6
(Italy) F Volandri	6	1	4	4
(Germany) A Waske	6^{6}	5	6^{7}
(United Kingdom) G Rusedski	7^{8}	7	7^{9}
(Italy) D Sanguinetti	2	3	3
5	(United States) A Roddick	6	6	6

Second round
12	(Thailand) P Srichaphan	4	1	7^{7}	7	7
(France) O Mutis	6	6	6^{4}	5	5
(Spain) R Nadal	6	6	6
WC	(United Kingdom) L Childs	2	4	3
25	(Spain) T Robredo	6	6	6
(United States) B Vahaly	4	4	2
(United Kingdom) G Rusedski	6^{4}	6^{1}	5
5	(United States) A Roddick	7^{7}	7^{7}	7

Third round
12	(Thailand) P Srichaphan	6	6	6
(Spain) R Nadal	4	4	2
25	(Spain) T Robredo	6^{5}	4	4
5	(United States) A Roddick	7^{7}	6	6

Fourth round
12	(Thailand) P Srichaphan	4	6	3	2
5	(United States) A Roddick	6	3	6	6

==== Section 3 ====
First round
4	(Switzerland) R Federer	6	6	7^{7}
(South Korea) H-t Lee	3	3	6^{2}
(Austria) S Koubek	4	6	6	6
(Belgium) C Rochus	6	3	1	1
(United States) J-M Gambill	6	6	6
LL	(Russia) I Kunitsyn	3	2	4
(United States) M Fish	6	4	6	6
29	(Argentina) G Gaudio	2	6	3	3
23	(Argentina) A Calleri	6	7	1
(Romania) A Voinea	2	5	0^{r}
(Brazil) F Saretta	6	6	6
WC	(United Kingdom) A Mackin	2	4	2
(Spain) F López	6	6	7^{7}
LL	(United States) R Kendrick	3	4	6^{4}
(Slovakia) K Beck	4	2	3
16	(Russia) M Youzhny	6	6	6

Second round
4	(Switzerland) R Federer	7	6	6
(Austria) S Koubek	5	1	1
(United States) J-M Gambill	4	4	1
(United States) M Fish	6	6	6
23	(Argentina) A Calleri	4	7^{15}	2	7^{7}	8
(Brazil) F Saretta	6	6^{13}	6	6^{5}	10
(Spain) F López	7^{7}	6	6
16	(Russia) M Youzhny	6^{5}	3	2

Third round
4	(Switzerland) R Federer	6	6	4	6
(United States) M Fish	3	1	6	1
(Brazil) F Saretta	4	4	4
(Spain) F López	6	6	6

Fourth round
4	(Switzerland) R Federer	7^{7}	6	6
(Spain) F López	6^{5}	4	4

==== Section 4 ====
First round
9	(Germany) R Schüttler	6	6	6^{4}	7
(Switzerland) M Kratochvil	3	4	7^{7}	5
(Sweden) A Vinciguerra	6	3	6	2	2
(France) F Santoro	4	6	2	6	6
(Spain) F Vicente	7^{7}	4	6	6^{6}	4
(United States) T Martin	6^{4}	6	2	7^{8}	6
(Netherlands) J van Lottum	6	2^{r}
17	(Brazil) G Kuerten	2	3
32	(Argentina) JI Chela	6	6	6
(Germany) T Behrend	4	2	3
LL	(Romania) V Hănescu	7^{7}	6	6
(Spain) A Portas	6^{4}	0	0
(Denmark) K Carlsen	3	4	6	4
(Ecuador) N Lapentti	6	6	3	6
WC	(United Kingdom) A Parmar	3	4	1
8	(Netherlands) S Schalken	6	6	6

Second round
9	(Germany) R Schüttler	6	6	6
(France) F Santoro	2	3	3
(United States) T Martin	7^{7}	6	6
17	(Brazil) G Kuerten	6^{4}	4	4
32	(Argentina) JI Chela	2	1	4
LL	(Romania) V Hănescu	6	6	6
(Ecuador) N Lapentti	2	6	7^{7}	6^{4}	3
8	(Netherlands) S Schalken	6	3	6^{3}	7^{7}	6

Third round
9	(Germany) R Schüttler	4	7	6^{1}	6	7
(United States) T Martin	6	5	7^{7}	1	5
LL	(Romania) V Hănescu	2	4	6^{3}
8	(Netherlands) S Schalken	6	6	7^{7}

Fourth round
9	(Germany) R Schüttler	5	4	5
8	(Netherlands) S Schalken	7	6	7

=== Bottom half ===
==== Section 5 ====
First round
6	(Argentina) D Nalbandian	7	6	6
(Belarus) V Voltchkov	5	4	2
(Brazil) A Sá	6	3
(Argentina) M Puerta	2	2^{r}
Q	(Belgium) D Norman	6^{8}	4	6^{3}
Q	(Japan) T Suzuki	7^{10}	6	7^{7}
(Slovakia) K Kučera	6	6	6
28	(South Africa) W Ferreira	1	2	4
21	(Netherlands) M Verkerk	3	4	7^{7}	1
Q	(Sweden) R Söderling	6	6	6^{5}	6
Q	(Belgium) G Elseneer	3	6	6	6
(Germany) N Kiefer	6	3	4	4
(Spain) D Sánchez	3	4	7^{10}	3
Q	(France) M Llodra	6	6	6^{8}	6
LL	(Czech Republic) T Zíb	2	6^{11}	6	1
10	(United Kingdom) T Henman	6	7^{13}	3	6

Second round
6	(Argentina) D Nalbandian	6	7	6
(Brazil) A Sá	2	5	2
Q	(Japan) T Suzuki	3	5	2
(Slovakia) K Kučera	6	7	6
Q	(Sweden) R Söderling	2	7^{10}	6	6
Q	(Belgium) G Elseneer	6	6^{8}	4	3
Q	(France) M Llodra	4	4	3
10	(United Kingdom) T Henman	6	6	6

Third round
6	(Argentina) D Nalbandian	6	5	6^{1}	6	6
(Slovakia) K Kučera	4	7	7^{7}	4	2
Q	(Sweden) R Söderling	3	1	4
10	(United Kingdom) T Henman	6	6	6

Fourth round
6	(Argentina) D Nalbandian	2	7^{7}	5	3
10	(United Kingdom) T Henman	6	6^{4}	7	6

==== Section 6 ====
First round
13	(France) S Grosjean	4	6	6	7^{7}
(Sweden) T Enqvist	6	3	4	6^{4}
(Spain) A Martín	6^{3}	1	6^{4}
(Australia) W Arthurs	7^{7}	6	7^{7}
Q	(South Africa) W Moodie	6	6	6
(Switzerland) M Rosset	4	4	4
Q	(Canada) F Niemeyer	6	7^{8}	4	7^{7}
22	(Spain) F Mantilla	4	6^{6}	6	6^{3}
26	(United States) J Blake	6	6	6
Q	(Australia) T Larkham	3	1	1
(Armenia) S Sargsian	6	6	6
WC	(United Kingdom) A Bogdanovic	1	3	2
(France) N Escudé	7^{9}	6	7^{7}
Q	(Greece) K Economidis	6^{7}	4	6^{5}
(France) J-R Lisnard	2	1	3
3	(Spain) JC Ferrero	6	6	6

Second round
13	(France) S Grosjean	6	6	6^{12}	6
(Australia) W Arthurs	3	4	7^{14}	3
Q	(South Africa) W Moodie	7^{10}	4	2	6	7
Q	(Canada) F Niemeyer	6^{8}	6	6	1	5
26	(United States) J Blake	2	6^{3}	2
(Armenia) S Sargsian	6	7^{7}	6
(France) N Escudé	7^{7}	3	3	0^{r}
3	(Spain) JC Ferrero	6^{5}	6	6	0

Third round
13	(France) S Grosjean	6^{5}	6	6	6
Q	(South Africa) W Moodie	7^{7}	2	4	4
(Armenia) S Sargsian	4	4	6	4
3	(Spain) JC Ferrero	6	6	2	6

Fourth round
13	(France) S Grosjean	6	4	7^{7}	7^{7}
3	(Spain) JC Ferrero	2	6	6^{2}	6^{3}

==== Section 7 ====
First round
7	(Argentina) G Coria	5	6^{4}	3
(Belgium) O Rochus	7	7^{7}	6
WC	(United Kingdom) R Bloomfield	4	6^{6}	3
(France) A Dupuis	6	7^{8}	6
LL	(Italy) S Galvani	6	2	1	6	8
(France) J Boutter	3	6	6	2	6
Q	(Spain) F Verdasco	7^{10}	4	6	3	3
30	(Finland) J Nieminen	6^{8}	6	4	6	6
20	(Russia) Y Kafelnikov	5	6	6	2	3
(Netherlands) R Sluiter	7	3	2	6	6
(Morocco) H Arazi	4	6^{5}	3
PR	(Germany) A Popp	6	7^{7}	6
(Spain) D Ferrer	1	6	6	6
WC	(United Kingdom) M Lee	6	3	1	2
(Peru) L Horna	6	6^{1}	1	1
11	(Czech Republic) J Novák	3	7^{7}	6	6

Second round
(Belgium) O Rochus	2	6	4	7^{7}	6
(France) A Dupuis	6	3	6	6^{5}	4
LL	(Italy) S Galvani	4	7	4	6^{3}
30	(Finland) J Nieminen	6	5	6	7^{7}
(Netherlands) R Sluiter	6^{4}	6	3	7^{7}	2
PR	(Germany) A Popp	7^{7}	4	6	6^{5}	6
(Spain) D Ferrer	2	5	3
11	(Czech Republic) J Novák	6	7	6

Third round
(Belgium) O Rochus	7^{7}	6	6
30	(Finland) J Nieminen	6^{5}	3	1
PR	(Germany) A Popp	6	6	7^{7}
11	(Czech Republic) J Novák	3	4	6^{3}

Fourth round
(Belgium) O Rochus	7	3	4	2
PR	(Germany) A Popp	5	6	6	6

==== Section 8 ====
First round
14	(Belgium) X Malisse	4	3	2
Q	(France) C Saulnier	6	6	6
(Argentina) M Zabaleta	3	6	3	2
(Australia) M Philippoussis	6	4	6	6
(Australia) S Draper	7^{7}	4	6	6
(France) P-H Mathieu	6^{5}	6	3	4
Q	(Slovakia) M Mertiňák	6^{6}	4	4
35	(Czech Republic) R Štěpánek	7^{8}	6	6
27	(Morocco) Y El Aynaoui	6	6	6
WC	(United Kingdom) M Hilton	3	2	4
(Croatia) Z Krajan	1	1	1
(Chile) N Massú	6	6	6
(Germany) L Burgsmüller	6	7^{7}	4	6
(Spain) A Montañés	3	6^{5}	6	2
WC	(United Kingdom) J Delgado	4	0	7	4
2	(United States) A Agassi	6	6	5	6

Second round
Q	(France) C Saulnier	3	2	6^{2}
(Australia) M Philippoussis	6	6	7^{7}
(Australia) S Draper	6^{6}	3	1
35	(Czech Republic) R Štěpánek	7^{8}	6	6
27	(Morocco) Y El Aynaoui	7^{7}	3	7^{7}	6
(Chile) N Massú	6^{5}	6	6^{4}	4
(Germany) L Burgsmüller	3	6^{4}	3
2	(United States) A Agassi	6	7^{7}	6

Third round
(Australia) M Philippoussis	4	7^{9}	6	7^{8}
35	(Czech Republic) R Štěpánek	6	6^{7}	4	6^{6}
27	(Morocco) Y El Aynaoui	7	4	6^{4}	6^{4}
2	(United States) A Agassi	5	6	7^{7}	7^{7}

Fourth round
(Australia) M Philippoussis	6	2	6^{4}	6	6
2	(United States) A Agassi	3	6	7^{7}	3	4

Preceded by 2003 French Open – Men's singles	Grand Slam men's singles	Succeeded by 2003 US Open – Men's singles
