= Anousjka van Exel =

Dutch tennis player

- Country (sports): Netherlands
- Born: 5 October 1974 (age 50); Heerhugowaard
- Prize money: $104,129

Singles
- Career record: 115–88
- Career titles: 3 ITF
- Highest ranking: No. 203 (7 April 2003)

Grand Slam singles results
- Australian Open: Q1 (2002, 2003)
- French Open: Q1 (2003)
- Wimbledon: Q2 (2002)
- US Open: Q1 (2001, 2003, 2004)

Doubles
- Career record: 91–71
- Career titles: 8 ITF
- Highest ranking: No. 100 (13 May 2002)

Grand Slam doubles results
- Australian Open: 3R (2002)
- French Open: 1R (2002)
- Wimbledon: 1R (2002)
- US Open: 1R (2001)

Team competitions
- Fed Cup: 1–3

Anousjka van Exel (born 5 October 1974) is a Dutch former tennis player.

== Career ==
She competed in tennis for Tulsa Golden Hurricane.

She won a total of eleven titles on the ITF Circuit during her career and reached a doubles ranking high of world No. 100 in May 2002, after reaching the third round of the women's doubles at the Australian Open earlier that year.

== ITF finals ==
=== Singles (3–6) ===
Legend $50,000 tournaments $40,000 tournaments $25,000 tournaments $10,000 tournaments	Finals by surface Hard (0–3) Clay (3–3)

Result	No.	Date	Location	Surface	Opponent	Score
Win	1.	18 June 2000	Hoorn, Netherlands	Clay	(Hungary) Melinda Czink	7–5, 7–6^{(9–7)}
Loss	1.	9 July 2000	Amersfoort, Netherlands	Clay	(Czech Republic) Zuzana Hejdová	w/o
Win	2.	23 July 2000	Brussels, Belgium	Clay	(Czech Republic) Magdalena Zděnovcová	6–4, 6–0
Win	3.	20 August 2000	Koksijde, Belgium	Clay	(Sweden) Maria Wolfbrandt	6–3, 6–4
Loss	2.	18 March 2001	Monterrey, Mexico	Clay	(Austria) Petra Rüssegger	0–6, 3–6
Loss	3.	24 June 2001	Lenzerheide, Switzerland	Clay	(France) Céline Beigbeder	3–6, 0–6
Loss	4.	22 July 2001	Valladolid, Spain	Hard	(Italy) Francesca Lubiani	6–7^{(8–10)}, 6–2, 4–6
Loss	5.	2 November 2003	Dalby, Australia	Hard	(Australia) Casey Dellacqua	3–6, 6–2, 5–7
Loss	6.	16 November 2003	Port Pirie, Australia	Hard	(Australia) Trudi Musgrave	4–6, 0–6

=== Doubles (8–4) ===
Result	No.	Date	Location	Surface	Partner	Opponents	Score
Win	1.	14 January 2001	Tallahassee, United States	Hard	(Netherlands) Marielle Hoogland	(Indonesia) Romana Tedjakusuma (India) Jyotsna Vasisht	7–6^{(7–5)}, 6–2
Win	2.	18 March 2001	Monterrey, Mexico	Clay	(United States) Elizabeth Schmidt	(Austria) Bianca Kamper (Austria) Isabella Mitterlehner	0–6, 6–2, 6–4
Win	3.	30 June 2001	Mont-de-Marsan, France	Clay	(Slovakia) Zuzana Váleková	(Czech Republic) Renata Kučerová (Czech Republic) Hana Šromová	6–1, 6–1
Win	4.	29 July 2001	Les Contamines, France	Hard	(Germany) Kirstin Freye	(France) Caroline Dhenin (Australia) Rochelle Rosenfield	6–3, 6–2
Loss	1.	26 January 2003	Fullerton, United States	Hard	(United States) Elizabeth Schmidt	(United States) Bethanie Mattek-Sands (United States) Shenay Perry	3–6, 2–6
Loss	2.	2 November 2003	Dalby, Australia	Hard	(United States) Elizabeth Schmidt	(Australia) Casey Dellacqua (Australia) Evie Dominikovic	7–6^{(8–6)}, 2–6, 1–6
Loss	3.	9 May 2004	Raleigh, United States	Clay	(Canada) Marie-Ève Pelletier	(United States) Ansley Cargill (Australia) Christina Wheeler	4–6, 4–6
Win	5.	4 July 2004	Stuttgart, Germany	Clay	(Germany) Vanessa Henke	(Ukraine) Mariya Koryttseva (Croatia) Darija Jurak	6–4, 7–5
Loss	4.	26 September 2004	Jersey, Great Britain	Hard (i)	(Turkey) İpek Şenoğlu	(Finland) Emma Laine (Germany) Kathrin Wörle-Scheller	6–1, 1–6, 1–6
Win	6.	3 October 2004	Porto, Portugal	Clay	(Ukraine) Yuliya Beygelzimer	(Italy) Sara Errani (Portugal) Joana Pangaio Pereira	7–5, 6–0
Win	7.	29 January 2005	Belfort, France	Hard (i)	(Netherlands) Michelle Gerards	(Austria) Daniela Klemenschits (Austria) Sandra Klemenschits	6–1, 4–2 ret.
Win	8.	20 February 2005	Bromma, Sweden	Hard (i)	(Netherlands) Michelle Gerards	(Japan) Ryōko Fuda (Japan) Rika Fujiwara	w/o

==== Unplayed final ====
Result	No.	Date	Tournament	Surface	Partner	Opponents	Score
NP	—	3 July 2000	Amersfoort, Netherlands	Clay	(Netherlands) Marielle Hoogland	(Romania) Diana Gherghi (Czech Republic) Zuzana Lešenarová	NP
