= 2003 in tennis =

This page covers all the important events in the sport of tennis in 2003. Primarily, it provides the results of notable tournaments throughout the year on both the ATP and WTA Tours, the Davis Cup, and the Fed Cup.

== ITF ==
=== Grand Slam events ===
==== Men's singles ====
Championship	Champion	Finalist	Score in the final
Australian Open	(United States) Andre Agassi	(Germany) Rainer Schüttler	6–2, 6–2, 6–1
French Open	(Spain) Juan Carlos Ferrero	(Netherlands) Martin Verkerk	6–1, 6–3, 6–2
Wimbledon	(Switzerland) Roger Federer	(Australia) Mark Philippoussis	7–6^{(7–5)}, 6–2, 7–6^{(7–3)}
US Open	(United States) Andy Roddick	(Spain) Juan Carlos Ferrero	6–3, 7–6^{(7–2)}, 6–3

==== Women's singles ====
Championship	Champion	Finalist	Score in the final
Australian Open	(United States) Serena Williams	(United States) Venus Williams	7–6^{(7–4)}, 3–6, 6–4
French Open	(Belgium) Justine Henin-Hardenne	(Belgium) Kim Clijsters	6–0, 6–4
Wimbledon	(United States) Serena Williams	(United States) Venus Williams	4–6, 6–4, 6–2
US Open	(Belgium) Justine Henin-Hardenne	(Belgium) Kim Clijsters	7–5, 6–1

==== Men's doubles ====
Championship	Champions	Finalists	Score in the final
Australian Open	(France) Michaël Llodra (France) Fabrice Santoro	(The Bahamas) Mark Knowles (Canada) Daniel Nestor	6–4, 3–6, 6–3
French Open	(United States) Bob Bryan (United States) Mike Bryan	(Netherlands) Paul Haarhuis (Russia) Yevgeny Kafelnikov	7–6^{(7–3)}, 6–3
Wimbledon	(Sweden) Jonas Björkman (Australia) Todd Woodbridge	(India) Mahesh Bhupathi (Belarus) Max Mirnyi	3–6, 6–3, 7–6^{(7–4)}, 6–3
US Open	(Sweden) Jonas Björkman (Australia) Todd Woodbridge	(United States) Bob Bryan (United States) Mike Bryan	5–7, 6–0, 7–5

==== Women's doubles ====
Championship	Champions	Finalists	Score in the final
Australian Open	(United States) Serena Williams (United States) Venus Williams	(Spain) Virginia Ruano (Argentina) Paola Suárez	4–6, 6–4, 6–3
French Open	(Belgium) Kim Clijsters (Japan) Ai Sugiyama	(Spain) Virginia Ruano (Argentina) Paola Suárez	6–7^{(5–7)}, 6–2, 9–7
Wimbledon	(Belgium) Kim Clijsters (Japan) Ai Sugiyama	(Spain) Virginia Ruano (Argentina) Paola Suárez	6–4, 6–4
US Open	(Spain) Virginia Ruano (Argentina) Paola Suárez	(Russia) Svetlana Kuznetsova (United States) Martina Navratilova	6–2, 6–3

==== Mixed doubles ====
Championship	Champions	Finalists	Score in the final
Australian Open	(United States) Martina Navratilova (India) Leander Paes	(Greece) Eleni Daniilidou (Australia) Todd Woodbridge	6–4, 7–5
French Open	(United States) Mike Bryan (United States) Lisa Raymond	(India) Mahesh Bhupathi (Russia) Elena Likhovtseva	6–3, 6–4
Wimbledon	(United States) Martina Navratilova (India) Leander Paes	(Israel) Andy Ram (Russia) Anastasia Rodionova	6–3, 6–3
US Open	(United States) Bob Bryan (Slovenia) Katarina Srebotnik	(Russia) Lina Krasnoroutskaya (Canada) Daniel Nestor	5–7, 7–5, [10–5]

=== Davis Cup ===
2003 Davis Cup Champions
(Australia)
Australia
Twenty-eighth title

Australia
3
Rod Laver Arena, Melbourne, Australia
28–30 November 2003
grass

Spain
1

			1	2	3	4	5
1	(Australia) (Spain)	Lleyton Hewitt; Juan Carlos Ferrero	3; 6	6; 3	3; 6	7^{7} 6^{0}	6; 2
2	(Australia) (Spain)	Mark Philippoussis; Carlos Moyà	4; 6	4; 6	6; 4	6^{5} 7^{7}
3	(Australia) (Spain)	Wayne Arthurs / Todd Woodbridge; Àlex Corretja / Feliciano López	6; 3	6; 1	6; 3
4	(Australia) (Spain)	Mark Philippoussis; Juan Carlos Ferrero	7; 5	6; 3	1; 6	2; 6	6; 0
5	(Australia) (Spain)	Lleyton Hewitt; Carlos Moyà						not played

=== Fed Cup ===
2003 Fed Cup Champions
(France)
France
Second title

France
4
Olympic Stadium, Moscow, Russia
22–23 November 2003
carpet (indoors)

United States
1

			1	2	3
1	(France) (United States)	Amélie Mauresmo; Lisa Raymond	6; 4	6; 3
2	(France) (United States)	Mary Pierce; Meghann Shaughnessy	6; 3	3; 6	8; 6
3	(France) (United States)	Amélie Mauresmo; Meghann Shaughnessy	6; 2	6; 1
4	(France) (United States)	Émilie Loit; Alexandra Stevenson	6; 4	6; 2
5	(France) (United States)	Stéphanie Cohen-Aloro / Émilie Loit; Martina Navratilova / Lisa Raymond	4; 6	0; 6

=== Hopman Cup ===
2003 Hopman Cup Champions
(United States)
United States
Second title

United States
3

Australia
0

			1	2	3
1	(United States) (Australia)	Serena Williams; Alicia Molik	6; 2	6; 3
2	(United States) (Australia)	James Blake; Lleyton Hewitt	6; 3	6; 4
3	(United States) (Australia)	Serena Williams / James Blake; Alicia Molik / Lleyton Hewitt	6; 3	6; 2

== ATP/WTA ==
- ATP calendar
- WTA calendar

=== Year-End Championships ===
==== Men's singles ====
Championship	Champion	Finalist	Score in the final
Houston	(Switzerland) Roger Federer	(United States) Andre Agassi	6–3, 6–0, 6–4

==== Women's singles ====
Championship	Champion	Finalist	Score in the final
Los Angeles	(Belgium) Kim Clijsters	(France) Amélie Mauresmo	6–2, 6–0

==== Men's doubles ====
Championship	Champions	Finalists	Score in the final
Houston	(United States) Bob Bryan (United States) Mike Bryan	(France) Michaël Llodra (France) Fabrice Santoro	6–7^{(6–8)}, 6–3, 3–6, 7–6^{(7–3)}, 6–4

==== Women's doubles ====
Championship	Champions	Finalists	Score in the final
Los Angeles	(Spain) Virginia Ruano (Argentina) Paola Suárez	(Belgium) Kim Clijsters (Japan) Ai Sugiyama	6–4, 3–6, 6–3

=== Masters Series/Tier I ===
==== Men's singles ====
Championship	Champion	Finalist	Score in the final
Indian Wells	(Australia) Lleyton Hewitt	(Brazil) Gustavo Kuerten	6–1, 6–1
Miami	(United States) Andre Agassi	(Spain) Carlos Moyà	6–3, 6–3
Monte Carlo	(Spain) Juan Carlos Ferrero	(Argentina) Guillermo Coria	6–2, 6–2
Rome	(Spain) Félix Mantilla	(Switzerland) Roger Federer	7–5, 6–2, 7–6^{(8–6)}
Hamburg	(Argentina) Guillermo Coria	(Argentina) Agustín Calleri	6–3, 6–4, 6–4
Montreal	(United States) Andy Roddick	(Argentina) David Nalbandian	6–1, 6–3
Cincinnati	(United States) Andy Roddick	(United States) Mardy Fish	4–6, 7–6^{(7–3)}, 7–6^{(7–4)}
Madrid	(Spain) Juan Carlos Ferrero	(Chile) Nicolás Massú	6–3, 6–4, 6–3
Paris	(United Kingdom) Tim Henman	(Romania) Andrei Pavel	6–2, 7–6^{(8–6)}, 7–6^{(7–2)}

==== Women's singles ====
Championship	Champion	Finalist	Score in the final
Tokyo	(United States) Lindsay Davenport	(United States) Monica Seles	6–7^{(6–8)}, 6–1, 6–2
Indian Wells	(Belgium) Kim Clijsters	(United States) Lindsay Davenport	6–4, 7–5
Miami	(United States) Serena Williams	(United States) Jennifer Capriati	4–6, 6–4, 6–1
Charleston	(Belgium) Justine Henin-Hardenne	(United States) Serena Williams	6–3, 6–4
Berlin	(Belgium) Justine Henin-Hardenne	(Belgium) Kim Clijsters	6–4, 4–6, 7–5
Rome	(Belgium) Kim Clijsters	(France) Amélie Mauresmo	3–6, 7–6^{(7–3)}, 6–0
Toronto	(Belgium) Justine Henin-Hardenne	(Russia) Lina Krasnoroutskaya	6–1, 6–0
Moscow	(Russia) Anastasia Myskina	(France) Amélie Mauresmo	6–2, 6–4
Zürich	(Belgium) Justine Henin-Hardenne	(Federal Republic of Yugoslavia) Jelena Dokić	6–0, 6–4

==== Men's doubles ====
Championship	Champions	Finalists	Score in the final
Indian Wells	(South Africa) Wayne Ferreira (Russia) Yevgeny Kafelnikov	(United States) Bob Bryan (United States) Mike Bryan	3–6, 7–5, 6–4
Miami	(Switzerland) Roger Federer (Belarus) Max Mirnyi	(India) Leander Paes (Czech Republic) David Rikl	7–5, 6–3
Monte Carlo	(India) Mahesh Bhupathi (Belarus) Max Mirnyi	(France) Michaël Llodra (France) Fabrice Santoro	6–4, 3–6, 7–6^{(8–6)}
Rome	(Australia) Wayne Arthurs (Australia) Paul Hanley	(France) Michaël Llodra (France) Fabrice Santoro	6–1, 6–3
Hamburg	(The Bahamas) Mark Knowles (Canada) Daniel Nestor	(India) Mahesh Bhupathi (Belarus) Max Mirnyi	6–4, 7–6^{(12–10)}
Montreal	(India) Mahesh Bhupathi (Belarus) Max Mirnyi	(Sweden) Jonas Björkman (Australia) Todd Woodbridge	6–3, 7–6^{(7–4)}
Cincinnati	(United States) Bob Bryan (United States) Mike Bryan	(Australia) Wayne Arthurs (Australia) Paul Hanley	7–5, 7–6^{(7–5)}
Madrid	(India) Mahesh Bhupathi (Belarus) Max Mirnyi	(Zimbabwe) Wayne Black (Zimbabwe) Kevin Ullyett	6–2, 2–6, 6–3
Paris	(Australia) Wayne Arthurs (Australia) Paul Hanley	(France) Michaël Llodra (France) Fabrice Santoro	6–3, 1–6, 6–3

==== Women's doubles ====
Championship	Champions	Finalists	Score in the final
Tokyo	(Russia) Elena Bovina (Australia) Rennae Stubbs	(United States) Lindsay Davenport (United States) Lisa Raymond	6–3, 6–4
Indian Wells	(United States) Lindsay Davenport (United States) Lisa Raymond	(Belgium) Kim Clijsters (Japan) Ai Sugiyama	2–6, 6–2, 7–6^{(7–5)}
Miami	(South Africa) Liezel Huber (Bulgaria) Magdalena Maleeva	(Japan) Shinobu Asagoe (Japan) Nana Miyagi	6–4, 3–6, 7–5
Charleston	(Spain) Virginia Ruano (Argentina) Paola Suárez	(Slovakia) Janette Husárová (Spain) Conchita Martínez	6–0, 6–3
Berlin	(Spain) Virginia Ruano (Argentina) Paola Suárez	(Belgium) Kim Clijsters (Japan) Ai Sugiyama	6–3, 4–6, 6–4
Rome	(Russia) Svetlana Kuznetsova (United States) Martina Navratilova	(Federal Republic of Yugoslavia) Jelena Dokić (Russia) Nadia Petrova	6–4, 5–7, 6–2
Toronto	(Russia) Svetlana Kuznetsova (United States) Martina Navratilova	(Venezuela) María Vento-Kabchi (Indonesia) Angelique Widjaja	3–6, 6–1, 6–1
Moscow	(Russia) Nadia Petrova (United States) Meghann Shaughnessy	(Russia) Anastasia Myskina (Russia) Vera Zvonareva	6–3, 6–4
Zürich	(Belgium) Kim Clijsters (Japan) Ai Sugiyama	(Spain) Virginia Ruano (Argentina) Paola Suárez	7–6^{(7–3)}, 6–2

=== Other competitions ===
==== ARAG World Team Cup ====
2003 ARAG World Team Cup Champions
(Chile)
Chile
1st title

Czech Republic
1
Rochusclub, Düsseldorf, Germany
18–24 May
Clay (outdoors)

Chile
2

			1	2	3
1	(Czech Republic) (Chile)	Jiří Novák; Fernando González	6^{4} 7^{7}	6^{5} 7^{7}
2	(Czech Republic) (Chile)	Radek Štěpánek; Marcelo Ríos	6; 3	7^{7} 6^{5}
3	(Czech Republic) (Chile)	Jiří Novák / Radek Štěpánek; Fernando González / Nicolás Massú	4; 6	2; 6

=== Year-End Top 10 ===
==== Men's Singles ====
#	Player	Points
1	(United States) Andy Roddick	4,535
2	(Switzerland) Roger Federer	4,375
3	(Spain) Juan Carlos Ferrero	4,205
4	(United States) Andre Agassi	3,425
5	(Argentina) Guillermo Coria	3,330
6	(Germany) Rainer Schüttler	3,205
7	(Spain) Carlos Moyà	2,280
8	(Argentina) David Nalbandian	2,060
9	(Australia) Mark Philippoussis	1,615
10	(France) Sebastien Grosjean	1,610

==== Women's Singles ====
#	Player	Points
1	(Belgium) Justine Henin-Hardenne	6,628
2	(Belgium) Kim Clijsters	6,553
3	(United States) Serena Williams	3,916
4	(France) Amélie Mauresmo	3,194
5	(United States) Lindsay Davenport	2,990
6	(United States) Jennifer Capriati	2,766
7	(Russia) Anastasia Myskina	2,581
8	(Russia) Elena Dementieva	2,383
9	(United States) Chanda Rubin	2,328
10	(Japan) Ai Sugiyama	2,235

== Tennis Hall of Fame ==
Class	Inductees	Category
Class of 2003	(Germany) Boris Becker	Player
Class of 2003	(France) Françoise Dürr	Player
Class of 2003	(United States) Nancy Richey	Player
Class of 2003	(Australia) Brian Tobin	Contributor

== Births and deaths ==
Births

- 29 April – Holger Rune, Danish tennis player
- 5 May – Carlos Alcaraz, Spanish tennis player

Deaths

- 12 August – Christian Boussus (95), French tennis player
