= Antony Dupuis =

French tennis player

- Country (sports): France
- Residence: Villeneuve-le-Comte, France
- Born: 24 February 1973 (age 52) Bayonne, France
- Height: 1.85 m (6 ft 1 in)
- Turned pro: 1992
- Retired: 2013
- Plays: Right-handed (one-handed backhand)
- Prize money: $1,591,333

Singles
- Career record: 85–128
- Career titles: 1
- Highest ranking: No. 57 (10 September 2001)

Grand Slam singles results
- Australian Open: 2R (2000, 2003)
- French Open: 3R (2001)
- Wimbledon: 2R (2001, 2004)
- US Open: 2R (2002, 2003)

Doubles
- Career record: 11–25
- Career titles: 1
- Highest ranking: No. 147 (24 April 2006)

Grand Slam doubles results
- Australian Open: 2R (2003)
- French Open: 2R (2002, 2005)
- Wimbledon: 1R (2003)
- US Open: 2R (2003)

Grand Slam mixed doubles results
- French Open: 1R (2002, 2003, 2006)

Antony Dupuis (French pronunciation: [ɑ̃tɔni dypɥi]; born 24 February 1973) is a French retired professional tennis player.

== Personal life ==
Dupuis began playing tennis at the age of nine with his father Xavier. He mentioned in an interview once that he prefers clay and hard court surfaces. He was coached by Benoit Carelli, whom he credits with improving his physical and mental ability. Carelli had coached Dupuis since February 1998.

== Career ==
Dupuis won one singles title in Milan in 2004 and reached a career-high singles ranking of World No. 57 in September 2001. In 2005, at the Valencia tournament, Dupuis became the first French player to defeat Novak Djokovic. In 2006 he tested positive for the banned drug Salbutamol and was suspended for two and a half months.

== ATP career finals ==
=== Singles: 2 (1 title, 1 runner-up) ===
Legend Grand Slam Tournaments (0–0) ATP World Tour Finals (0–0) ATP Masters Series (0–0) ATP Championship Series (0–0) ATP World Series (1–1)	Finals by surface Hard (0–0) Clay (0–1) Grass (0–0) Carpet (1–0)	Finals by setting Outdoors (0–1) Indoors (1–0)

Result	W–L	Date	Tournament	Tier	Surface	Opponent	Score
Loss	0–1	Apr 2001	Munich, Germany	International Series	Clay	(Czech Republic) Jiří Novák	4–6, 5–7
Win	1–1	Feb 2004	Milan, Italy	World Series	Carpet	(Croatia) Mario Ančić	6–4, 6–7^{(12–14)}, 7–6^{(7–5)}

=== Doubles: 1 (1 title) ===
Legend Grand Slam Tournaments (0–0) ATP World Tour Finals (0–0) ATP Masters Series (0–0) ATP Championship Series (0–0) ATP World Series (1–0)	Finals by surface Hard (1–0) Clay (0–0) Grass (0–0) Carpet (0–0)	Finals by setting Outdoors (1–0) Indoors (0–0)

Result	W–L	Date	Tournament	Tier	Surface	Partner	Opponents	Score
Win	1–0	Aug 2004	Long Island, United States	International Series	Hard	(France) Michaël Llodra	(Switzerland) Yves Allegro (Germany) Michael Kohlmann	6–2, 6–4

== ATP Challenger and ITF Futures finals ==
=== Singles: 23 (12–11) ===
Legend ATP Challenger (8–7) ITF Futures (4–4)	Finals by surface Hard (7–7) Clay (2–3) Grass (1–1) Carpet (2–0)

Result	W–L	Date	Tournament	Tier	Surface	Opponent	Score
Loss	0–1	Apr 1998	Vadodara, India	Challenger	Grass	(Australia) Peter Tramacchi	6–7, 7–6, 3–6
Win	1–1	Dec 1998	Ahmedabad, India	Challenger	Hard	(Uzbekistan) Oleg Ogorodov	6–4, 6–2
Win	2–1	Jan 1999	Bombay, India	Challenger	Hard	(France) Julien Boutter	7–5, 7–6
Loss	2–2	Feb 1999	Cherbourg, France	Challenger	Hard	(France) Sebastien Grosjean	6–4, 3–6, 0–6
Loss	2–3	Mar 1999	Grenoble, France	Challenger	Hard	(France) Julien Boutter	2–6, 6–4, 4–6
Win	3–3	Aug 1999	Binghamton, United States	Challenger	Hard	(New Zealand) Brett Steven	6–7, 6–1, 6–4
Loss	3–4	Sep 2000	France F18, Mulhouse	Futures	Hard	(Croatia) Ivo Karlovic	7–6^{(7–4)}, 6–7^{(5–7)}, 4–6
Win	4–4	Oct 2000	Grenoble, France	Challenger	Hard	(Netherlands) Jan Siemerink	7–6^{(12–10)}, 7–6^{(13–11)}
Loss	4–5	Nov 2000	Puebla, Mexico	Challenger	Hard	(United States) Brandon Hawk	6–7^{(6–8)}, 3–6
Loss	4–6	Dec 2000	Urbana, Mexico	Challenger	Hard	(United States) Jeff Salzenstein	6–7^{(4–7)}, 4–6
Win	5–6	Dec 2000	San Jose, Costa Rica	Challenger	Hard	(Brazil) Alexandre Simoni	7–6^{(7–5)}, 4–6, 6–3
Loss	5–7	Feb 2001	Wroclaw, Poland	Challenger	Hard	(Germany) Axel Pretzsch	5–7, 6–7^{(1–7)}
Loss	5–8	Feb 2002	Wroclaw, Poland	Challenger	Hard	(Italy) Davide Sanguinetti	3–6, 2–6
Win	6–8	Nov 2002	Bratislava, Slovakia	Challenger	Carpet	(Slovakia) Karol Beck	4–6, 6–4, 7–6^{(7–1)}
Win	7–8	Jul 2006	Nottingham, United Kingdom	Challenger	Grass	(Spain) Iván Navarro	6–4, 7–5
Win	8–8	Mar 2007	Switzerland F3, Wilen	Futures	Carpet	(Germany) Alexander Flock	6–2, 6–3
Win	9–8	Apr 2007	France F7, Grasse	Futures	Clay	(France) Xavier Pujo	2–6, 7–5, 6–1
Win	10–8	May 2007	Fergana, Uzbekistan	Challenger	Hard	(Russia) Pavel Chekhov	6–1, 6–4
Loss	10–9	Jul 2009	Germany F11, Cologne	Futures	Clay	(Slovakia) Pavol Cervenak	2–6, 2–6
Win	11–9	Oct 2009	France F18, Saint-Dizier	Futures	Hard	(Republic of Ireland) Conor Niland	6–3, 4–6, 6–4
Loss	11–10	Aug 2010	Austria F5, Pörtschach	Futures	Clay	(France) Axel Michon	4–6, 5–7
Loss	11–11	Sep 2010	Austria F6, Wels	Futures	Clay	(France) Axel Michon	3–6, 7–6^{(7–2)}, 3–6
Win	12–11	Sep 2010	Germany F15, Trier	Futures	Clay	(Belgium) Alexandre Folie	6–4, 6–0

=== Doubles: 2 (0–2) ===
Legend ATP Challenger (0–2) ITF Futures (0–0)	Finals by surface Hard (0–2) Clay (0–0) Grass (0–0) Carpet (0–0)

Result	W–L	Date	Tournament	Tier	Surface	Partner	Opponents	Score
Loss	0–1	Sep 2005	Orléans, France	Challenger	Hard	(France) Gregory Carraz	(France) Julien Benneteau (France) Nicolas Mahut	6–3, 4–6, 2–6
Loss	0–2	Feb 2006	Andrezieux, France	Challenger	Hard	(France) Gregory Carraz	(France) Julien Benneteau (France) Nicolas Mahut	4–6, 4–6

== Performance timelines ==
Key
W	F	SF	QF	#R	RR	Q#	P#	DNQ	A	Z#	PO	G	S	B	NMS	NTI	P	NH

(W) winner; (F) finalist; (SF) semifinalist; (QF) quarterfinalist; (#R) rounds 4, 3, 2, 1; (RR) round-robin stage; (Q#) qualification round; (P#) preliminary round; (DNQ) did not qualify; (A) absent; (Z#) Davis/Fed Cup Zonal Group (with number indication) or (PO) play-off; (G) gold, (S) silver or (B) bronze Olympic/Paralympic medal; (NMS) not a Masters tournament; (NTI) not a Tier I tournament; (P) postponed; (NH) not held; (SR) strike rate (events won / competed); (W–L) win–loss record.

=== Singles ===
Tournament	1993	1994	1995	1996	1997	1998	1999	2000	2001	2002	2003	2004	2005	2006	2007	2008	SR	W–L	Win%
Grand Slam tournaments
Australian Open	A	A	A	A	A	A	Q2	2R	Q2	1R	2R	1R	1R	Q1	Q2	Q2	0 / 5	2–5	29%
French Open	Q1	A	Q1	Q1	A	Q2	1R	1R	3R	1R	1R	1R	1R	Q2	A	Q1	0 / 7	2–7	22%
Wimbledon	A	A	Q1	Q1	A	Q1	A	Q2	2R	1R	2R	1R	1R	Q1	A	Q2	0 / 5	2–5	29%
US Open	A	A	A	A	A	Q3	Q1	A	1R	2R	2R	1R	Q3	Q1	Q1	A	0 / 4	2–4	33%
Win–loss	0–0	0–0	0–0	0–0	0–0	0–0	0–1	1–2	3–3	1–4	3–4	0–4	0–3	0–0	0–0	0–0	0 / 21	8–21	28%
ATP Tour Masters 1000
Indian Wells	A	A	A	A	A	A	A	A	Q1	A	A	2R	1R	A	A	A	0 / 2	1–2	33%
Miami	A	A	A	A	A	A	A	Q2	Q2	1R	2R	Q2	1R	A	A	A	0 / 3	1–3	25%
Monte Carlo	A	A	A	A	A	A	A	Q1	Q2	Q2	Q2	Q1	A	A	A	A	0 / 0	0–0	–
Rome	A	A	A	A	A	A	A	A	A	Q1	A	Q1	A	Q1	A	A	0 / 0	0–0	–
Hamburg	A	A	A	A	A	A	A	A	1R	1R	2R	1R	A	A	A	A	0 / 4	1–4	20%
Cincinnati	A	Q2	A	A	A	A	A	A	A	A	Q1	A	A	A	A	A	0 / 0	0–0	–
Stuttgart	A	A	A	A	A	A	A	A	Q2	Not Masters Series							0 / 0	0–0	–
Madrid	Not Masters Series									A	Q1	3R	A	A	A	A	0 / 1	2–1	67%
Paris	A	Q2	A	A	A	Q2	Q1	A	1R	1R	Q2	Q1	Q2	A	A	A	0 / 2	0–2	0%
Win–loss	0–0	0–0	0–0	0–0	0–0	0–0	0–0	0–0	0–2	0–3	2–2	3–3	0–2	0–0	0–0	0–0	0 / 12	5–12	29%

== See also ==
- List of doping cases in sport
