= Julien Varlet =

French tennis player

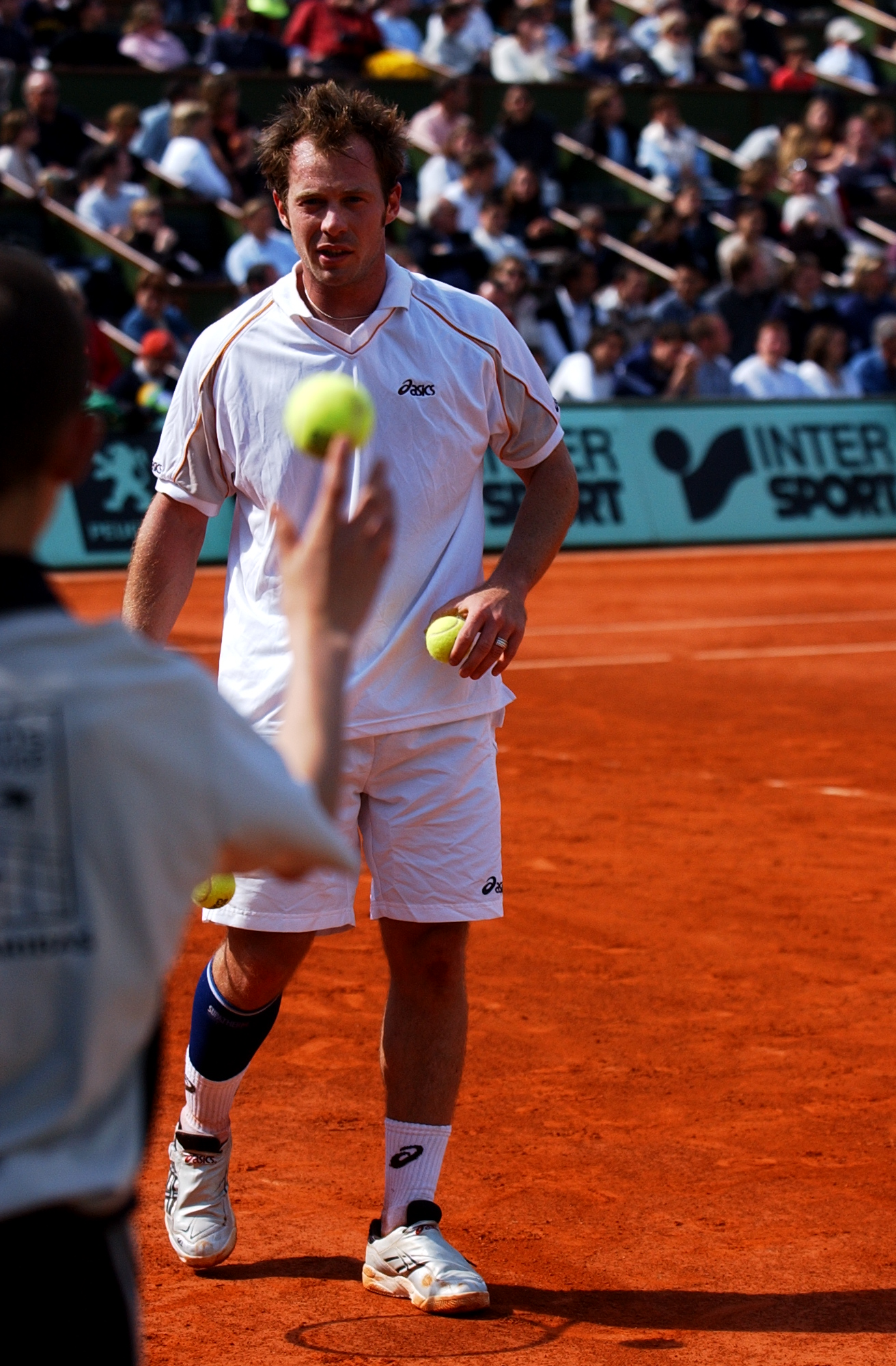
- Julien Varlet (2002)
- Country (sports): France
- Residence: Paris
- Born: 8 September 1977 (age 49) Cambrai, France
- Height: 1.80 m (5 ft 11 in)
- Turned pro: 1997
- Plays: Right-handed
- Prize money: $188,412

Singles
- Career record: 3–8
- Career titles: 0
- Highest ranking: No. 135 (17 February 2003)

Grand Slam singles results
- Australian Open: 1R (2003)
- French Open: 2R (2003)

Doubles
- Career record: 1–2
- Career titles: 0
- Highest ranking: No. 259 (23 February 2004)

Grand Slam doubles results
- French Open: 2R (2003)

Mixed doubles
- Career titles: 0

Grand Slam mixed doubles results
- French Open: 2R (2002)

Julien Varlet (born 8 September 1977) is a French former professional tennis player.

Varlet was a singles participant at three Grand Slams and at each event exited in a five set match. He lost to Mark Philippoussis in the opening round of 2002 French Open, despite taking the first two sets. In the 2003 Australian Open he was defeated in five sets in the first round by 13th seed Fernando González. At the 2003 French Open he again wasted a two set lead in losing to the seeded Jarkko Nieminen, but had won his first round match, over Kenneth Carlsen of Denmark.

He played both men's doubles and mixed doubles in the 2002 French Open. The Bryan brothers proved too good for he and Olivier Patience in the men's doubles first round but in the mixed doubles he was able to reach the second round, with partner Alexandra Fusai.

The Frenchman was a quarter-finalist in the 2003 Breil Milano Indoor tournament which was his best result on the ATP Tour and included wins over two top 50 players, Feliciano López and Xavier Malisse. He did better in the men's doubles at the 2003 French Open, with Thierry Ascione. The pair defeated the Slovak pairing of Karol Beck and Karol Kučera in the first round, then lost to Mahesh Bhupathi and Max Mirnyi.
