= Martin Verkerk =

Dutch tennis player

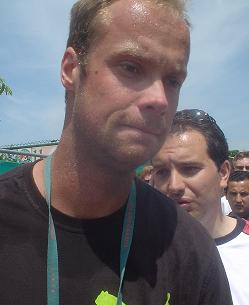
- Country (sports): Netherlands
- Residence: Alphen a/d Rijn, Netherlands
- Born: 31 October 1978 (age 47) Leiderdorp, Netherlands
- Height: 1.95 m (6 ft 5 in)
- Turned pro: 1996
- Retired: 2008
- Plays: Right-handed (one-handed backhand)
- Prize money: $1,564,520

Singles
- Career record: 59–70 (45.7%)
- Career titles: 2
- Highest ranking: No. 14 (15 September 2003)

Grand Slam singles results
- Australian Open: 1R (2003, 2004)
- French Open: F (2003)
- Wimbledon: 2R (2004)
- US Open: 2R (2003)

Doubles
- Career record: 24–37 (39.3%)
- Career titles: 0
- Highest ranking: No. 63 (3 November 2003)

Grand Slam doubles results
- Australian Open: 1R (2004)
- French Open: 2R (2003, 2004, 2007)
- Wimbledon: 2R (2004)
- US Open: 2R (2003)
- Last updated on: 28 January 2022.

Martin Willem Verkerk (Dutch pronunciation: [ˈmɑrtɪɱ vərˈkɛrk]; born 31 October 1978) is a retired professional Dutch tennis player. He reached the final of the French Open in 2003 and achieved a career-high singles ranking of No. 14 in September 2003. During his career, he won two ATP singles titles.

== Early life ==
Verkerk began playing tennis at the age of seven, playing in local tournaments and training with his parents. He played in a tennis facility in his hometown of Alphen aan den Rijn, Netherlands, where his talent was recognized by local coaches, and he soon had the opportunity to train with many better players. He later won the 18 and Under Dutch title in 1995.

== Career ==
In 2003, playing in only his third Grand Slam event and ranked 46, Verkerk reached the final of the French Open. Along the way, he beat Željko Krajan, Luis Horna, Vince Spadea and Rainer Schüttler before overcoming experienced clay court players Carlos Moyá (seeded 4th) and Guillermo Coria (seeded 7th). In the final, he lost to Spaniard Juan Carlos Ferrero in straight sets.

His unexpected run at the French Open as an underdog and his expressive on-court antics made him popular in the Netherlands. The final was watched by even more households in the Netherlands than when his countryman Richard Krajicek won Wimbledon in 1996. However, hampered by various injuries and mononucleosis, Verkerk was unable to reproduce similar results during the rest of his career, never advancing beyond the third round in any subsequent Grand Slams.

During his career, he won two titles and reached the quarter-finals of the 2003 Rome Masters. Verkerk played a close match against Roger Federer at the 2003 Paris Masters, losing in three tiebreak sets after holding four match points.

== Playing style ==
Verkerk's game was based on powerful serves and backhands. He used a single-handed backhand and his favorite surface was clay.

== Grand Slam finals ==
=== Singles (1 runner-up) ===
Result	Year	Championship	Surface	Opponent	Score
Loss	2003	French Open	Clay	(Spain) Juan Carlos Ferrero	1–6, 3–6, 2–6

== ATP career finals ==
=== Singles: 4 (2 titles, 2 runner-ups) ===
Legend Grand Slam Tournaments (0–1) ATP World Tour Finals (0–0) ATP Masters Series (0–0) ATP Championship Series (0–0) ATP World Series (2–1)	Finals by surface Hard (0–0) Clay (1–2) Grass (0–0) Carpet (1–0)	Finals by setting Outdoors (1–2) Indoors (1–0)

Result	W–L	Date	Tournament	Tier	Surface	Opponent	Score
Win	1–0	Feb 2003	Milan, Italy	World Series	Carpet	(Russia) Yevgeny Kafelnikov	6–4, 5–7, 7–5
Loss	1–1	May 2003	Paris, France	Grand Slam	Clay	(Spain) Juan Carlos Ferrero	1–6, 3–6, 2–6
Loss	1–2	May 2004	Munich, Germany	International Series	Clay	(Russia) Nikolay Davydenko	4–6, 5–7
Win	2–2	Jul 2004	Amersfoort, Netherlands	International Series	Clay	(Chile) Fernando González	7–6^{(7–5)}, 4–6, 6–4

=== Doubles: 2 (2 runner-ups) ===
Legend Grand Slam Tournaments (0–0) ATP World Tour Finals (0–0) ATP Masters Series (0–0) ATP Championship Series (0–0) ATP World Series (0–2)	Finals by surface Hard (0–2) Clay (0–0) Grass (0–0) Carpet (0–0)	Finals by setting Outdoors (0–2) Indoors (0–0)

Result	W–L	Date	Tournament	Tier	Surface	Partner	Opponents	Score
Loss	0–1	Sep 2002	Tashkent, Uzbekistan	International Series	Hard	(Netherlands) Raemon Sluiter	(South Africa) David Adams (South Africa) Robbie Koenig	2–6, 5–7
Loss	0–2	Mar 2003	Delray Beach, United States	International Series	Hard	(Netherlands) Raemon Sluiter	(Federal Republic of Yugoslavia) Nenad Zimonjić (India) Leander Paes	5–7, 6–3, 5–7

== ATP Challenger and ITF Futures finals ==
=== Singles: 20 (10–10) ===
Legend ATP Challenger (4–7) ITF Futures (6–3)	Finals by surface Hard (3–4) Clay (6–5) Grass (0–0) Carpet (1–1)

Result	W–L	Date	Tournament	Tier	Surface	Opponent	Score
Win	1-0	Apr 1999	France F3, Melun	Futures	Carpet	(France) Gregory Girault	7–6, 6–4
Win	2-0	Jun 1999	Germany F5, Augsburg	Futures	Clay	(Argentina) Diego Moyano	6–3, 6–4
Win	3-0	Jun 1999	Germany F6, Trier	Futures	Clay	(Argentina) Diego Moyano	6–2, 6–0
Loss	3-1	Jul 1999	Scheveningen, Netherlands	Challenger	Clay	(Spain) Emilio Benfele Álvarez	3–6, 6–3, 2–3 ret.
Win	4-1	Oct 2000	USA F23, waco	Futures	Hard	(Canada) Simon Larose	6–1, 6–2
Loss	4-2	Apr 2001	USA F7, Mobile	Futures	Hard	(United States) Michael Russell	6–4, 1–6, 4–6
Loss	4-3	Apr 2001	USA F8, Little Rock	Futures	Hard	(Sweden) Fredrik Jonsson	3–6, 4–6
Loss	4-4	Jun 2001	Germany F5, Trier	Futures	Clay	(Argentina) Christian Kordasz	4–6, 2–6
Loss	4-5	Jul 2001	Eisenach, Germany	Challenger	Clay	(Germany) Oliver Gross	7–5, 2–6, 1–6
Loss	4-6	Sep 2001	Aschaffenburg, Germany	Challenger	Clay	(Germany) Simon Greul	6–7^{(5–7)}, 2–6
Loss	4-7	Jan 2002	Waikoloa, United States	Challenger	Hard	(United States) James Blake	2–6, 3–6
Loss	4-8	Feb 2002	Dallas, United States	Challenger	Hard	(United States) Jeff Morrison	4–6, 4–6
Win	5-8	Jun 2002	Turin, Italy	Challenger	Clay	(Uzbekistan) Vadim Kutsenko	4–6, 6–4, 6–3
Loss	5-9	Jul 2002	Ulm, Germany	Challenger	Clay	(Germany) Oliver Gross	6–7^{(5–7)}, 6–4, 3–6
Win	6-9	Nov 2002	Knoxville, United States	Challenger	Hard	(United States) Mardy Fish	6–3, 6–4
Loss	6-10	Feb 2003	Lübeck, Germany	Challenger	Carpet	(Germany) Alexander Waske	6–7^{(3–7)}, 3–6
Win	7-10	Jul 2003	Hilversum, Netherlands	Challenger	Clay	(Netherlands) John Van Lottum	6–3, 6–1
Win	8-10	Mar 2008	Canada F2, Montreal	Futures	Hard	(Romania) Florin Mergea	6–7^{(8–10)}, 7–6^{(11–9)}, 6–4
Win	9-10	Apr 2008	Athens, Greece	Challenger	Clay	(Romania) Adrian Cruciat	6–3, 6–3
Win	10-10	Jul 2008	Germany F9, Kassel	Futures	Clay	(Chile) Felipe Parada	6–4, 7–6^{(13–11)}

=== Doubles: 7 (3–4) ===
Legend ATP Challenger (3–1) ITF Futures (0–3)	Finals by surface Hard (1–1) Clay (2–2) Grass (0–0) Carpet (0–1)

Result	W–L	Date	Tournament	Tier	Surface	Partner	Opponents	Score
Loss	0–1	Feb 1998	Great Britain F2, Chigwell	Futures	Carpet	(Netherlands) Martijn Belgraver	(United Kingdom) Barry Cowan (United Kingdom) Tom Spinks	4–6, 4–6
Loss	0–2	May 1998	Germany F7, Augsburg	Futures	Clay	(Netherlands) Martijn Belgraver	(Germany) Sascha Bandermann (New Zealand) James Greenhalgh	3–6, 7–6, 1–6
Loss	0–3	May 1999	Italy F6, Viterbo	Futures	Clay	(Venezuela) Kepler Orellana	(Italy) Daniele Bracciali (Italy) Filippo Messori	1–6, 7–5, 4–6
Win	1–3	Jun 2002	Eisenach, Germany	Challenger	Clay	(Netherlands) Edwin Kempes	(Brazil) Marcos Daniel (Chile) Adrián García	6–3, 6–4
Win	2–3	Jul 2002	Scheveningen, Netherlands	Challenger	Clay	(Netherlands) Edwin Kempes	(Argentina) Mariano Hood (Argentina) Sebastián Prieto	6–4, 6–4
Win	3–3	Nov 2002	Knoxville, United States	Challenger	Hard	(Russia) Dmitry Tursunov	(United States) Hugo Armando (Argentina) Sergio Roitman	6–3, 6–4
Loss	3–4	Nov 2002	Champaign-Urbana, United States	Challenger	Hard	(United States) Eric Taino	(Romania) Gabriel Trifu (United States) Glenn Weiner	3–6, 2–6

== Performance timelines ==
Key
W	F	SF	QF	#R	RR	Q#	DNQ	A	NH

(W) winner; (F) finalist; (SF) semifinalist; (QF) quarterfinalist; (#R) rounds 4, 3, 2, 1; (RR) round-robin stage; (Q#) qualification round; (DNQ) did not qualify; (A) absent; (NH) not held; (SR) strike rate (events won / competed); (W–L) win–loss record.

=== Singles ===
Tournament	2002	2003	2004	2005	2006	2007	SR	W–L	Win%
Grand Slam tournaments
Australian Open	Q1	1R	1R	A	A	A	0 / 2	0–2	0%
French Open	Q3	F	3R	A	A	1R	0 / 3	8–3	73%
Wimbledon	A	1R	2R	A	A	A	0 / 2	1–2	33%
US Open	1R	2R	A	A	A	A	0 / 2	1–2	33%
Win–loss	0–1	7–4	3–3	0–0	0–0	0–1	0 / 9	10–9	53%
ATP World Tour Masters 1000
Indian Wells	A	A	2R	A	A	A	0 / 1	0–1	0%
Miami	1R	2R	2R	A	A	1R	0 / 4	1–4	20%
Monte Carlo	A	1R	2R	A	A	1R	0 / 3	1–3	25%
Hamburg	A	A	1R	A	A	1R	0 / 2	0–2	0%
Rome	A	QF	2R	A	A	1R	0 / 3	4–3	57%
Madrid	A	2R	A	A	A	A	0 / 1	0–1	0%
Canada	A	2R	A	A	A	A	0 / 1	1–1	50%
Cincinnati	Q2	1R	A	A	A	A	0 / 1	0–1	0%
Paris	A	3R	A	A	A	A	0 / 1	1–1	50%
Win–loss	0–1	6–7	2–5	0–0	0–0	0–4	0 / 17	8–17	32%

=== Doubles ===
Tournament	2003	2004	2005	2006	2007	SR	W–L	Win%
Grand Slam tournaments
Australian Open	A	1R	A	A	A	0 / 1	0–1	0%
French Open	2R	2R	A	A	2R	0 / 3	3–3	50%
Wimbledon	1R	2R	A	A	1R	0 / 3	1–3	25%
US Open	2R	A	A	A	A	0 / 1	1–1	50%
Win–loss	2–3	2–3	0–0	0–0	1–2	0 / 8	5–8	38%
ATP World Tour Masters 1000
Indian Wells	A	1R	A	A	A	0 / 1	0–1	0%
Miami	A	1R	A	A	A	0 / 1	0–1	0%
Madrid	SF	A	A	A	A	0 / 1	2–1	67%
Cincinnati	1R	A	A	A	A	0 / 1	0–1	0%
Win–loss	2–2	0–2	0–0	0–0	0–0	0 / 4	2–4	33%
