= 2003 Western & Southern Financial Group Masters – Singles =

Singles
- 2003 Western & Southern Financial Group Masters

Final
- Champion: (United States) Andy Roddick
- Runner-up: (United States) Mardy Fish
- Score: 4–6, 7–6^{(7–3)}, 7–6^{(7–4)}

Details
- Draw: 64 (4WC/8Q)
- Seeds: 17

Events
Singles	Doubles
- Cincinnati Open

Andy Roddick defeated Mardy Fish in the final, 4–6, 7–6^{(7–3)}, 7–6^{(7–4)} to win the singles tennis title at the 2003 Cincinnati Masters.

Carlos Moyá was the defending champion, but lost in the first round to Fabrice Santoro.

== Seeds ==
1. (United States) ~~Andre Agassi~~ (withdrew)
2. (Spain) Juan Carlos Ferrero (second round)
3. (Switzerland) Roger Federer (second round)
4. (Spain) Carlos Moyá (first round)
5. (Australia) Lleyton Hewitt (first round)
6. (Argentina) Guillermo Coria (quarterfinals)
7. (United States) Andy Roddick (champion)
8. (Germany) Rainer Schüttler (semifinals)
9. (Thailand) Paradorn Srichaphan (first round)
10. (France) Sébastien Grosjean (first round)
11. (Netherlands) Sjeng Schalken (second round)
12. (Czech Republic) Jiří Novák (first round)
13. (Chile) Fernando González (second round)
14. (Brazil) Gustavo Kuerten (first round)
15. (Spain) Tommy Robredo (first round)
16. (Netherlands) Martin Verkerk (first round)
17. (Spain) Félix Mantilla (first round)

== Draw ==
Key

- Q = Qualifier
- WC = Wild card
- LL = Lucky loser
- Alt = Alternate
- ITF = ITF entry
- PR = Protected ranking
- SR = Special ranking
- SE = Special exempt
- JE = Junior exempt
- JR = Junior Accelerator Programme entrant
- CO = College Accelerator Programme entrant
- NG = Next Gen Accelerator Program entrant
- w/o = Walkover
- r = Retired
- d = Defaulted

=== Finals ===
Quarterfinals
(Belarus) Max Mirnyi	6	7
6	(Argentina) Guillermo Coria	2	5
(Argentina) Mariano Zabaleta	1	2
7	(United States) Andy Roddick	6	6
(United States) Mardy Fish	7^{7}	6
(Argentina) David Nalbandian	6^{3}	3
8	(Germany) Rainer Schüttler	6	6
(United States) Robby Ginepri	2	3

Semifinals
(Belarus) Max Mirnyi	6^{5}	4
7	(United States) Andy Roddick	7^{7}	6
(United States) Mardy Fish	7^{7}	7^{8}
8	(Germany) Rainer Schüttler	6^{4}	6^{6}

Final
7	(United States) Andy Roddick	4	7^{7}	7^{7}
(United States) Mardy Fish	6	6^{3}	6^{4}

=== Top half ===
==== Section 1 ====
First round
17	(Spain) F Mantilla	3	6^{5}
WC	(Sweden) T Enqvist	6	7^{7}
(Spain) À Corretja	6	3	6^{2}
(Belarus) M Mirnyi	3	6	7^{7}
WC	(United States) M Chang	6	6^{7}	0
Q	(Morocco) H Arazi	4	7^{9}	6
(France) P-H Mathieu	6	4	6
15	(Spain) T Robredo	4	6	3
10	(France) S Grosjean	3	7^{11}	3
Q	(South Africa) W Moodie	6	6^{9}	6
(Argentina) A Calleri	3	3
(Russia) M Youzhny	6	6
(Russia) Y Kafelnikov	6	6
(United States) J-M Gambill	4	4
(United Kingdom) T Henman	3	6	4
6	(Argentina) G Coria	6	4	6

Second round
WC	(Sweden) T Enqvist	6^{2}	4
(Belarus) M Mirnyi	7^{7}	6
Q	(Morocco) H Arazi	6	6
(France) P-H Mathieu	2	1
Q	(South Africa) W Moodie	4	6^{4}
(Russia) M Youzhny	6	7^{7}
(Russia) Y Kafelnikov	0	4	r
6	(Argentina) G Coria	6	5

Third round
(Belarus) M Mirnyi	6	6^{7}	6
Q	(Morocco) H Arazi	4	7^{9}	4
(Russia) M Youzhny	2	1
6	(Argentina) G Coria	6	6

Quarterfinals
(Belarus) M Mirnyi	6	7
6	(Argentina) G Coria	2	5

==== Section 2 ====
First round
4	(Spain) C Moyá	6	3	4
(France) F Santoro	3	6	6
(Brazil) F Saretta	6^{2}	6	6
(Spain) D Sánchez	7^{7}	1	2
(United States) V Spadea	5	4
(Morocco) Y El Aynaoui	7	6
(Argentina) M Zabaleta	6	6
14	(Brazil) G Kuerten	4	0
11	(Netherlands) S Schalken	6	6
(South Korea) H-T Lee	4	3
(South Africa) W Ferreira	1	6^{0}
(United States) J Blake	6	7^{7}
(Croatia) I Ljubičić	3	7	6
(Ecuador) N Lapentti	6	5	3
Q	(Spain) F Verdasco	3	2
7	(United States) A Roddick	6	6

Second round
(France) F Santoro	5	3
(Brazil) F Saretta	7	6
(Morocco) Y El Aynaoui	7^{7}	4	5
(Argentina) M Zabaleta	6^{4}	6	7
11	(Netherlands) S Schalken	1	4
(United States) J Blake	6	6
(Croatia) I Ljubičić	1	4
7	(United States) A Roddick	6	6

Third round
(Brazil) F Saretta	7^{7}	2	4
(Argentina) M Zabaleta	6^{5}	6	6
(United States) J Blake	6^{2}	2
7	(United States) A Roddick	7^{7}	6

Quarterfinals
(Argentina) M Zabaleta	1	2
7	(United States) A Roddick	6	6

=== Bottom half ===
==== Section 3 ====
First round
5	(Australia) L Hewitt	6	4	2
(Belgium) X Malisse	3	6	6
(Australia) M Philippoussis	6	3	4
(United States) M Fish	1	6	6
(France) A Clément	7^{7}	6
(Spain) A Costa	6^{5}	4
(United Kingdom) G Rusedski	2	7^{7}	6
12	(Czech Republic) J Novák	6	6^{3}	4
13	(Chile) F González	7	6
WC	(United States) B Vahaly	5	2
(Slovakia) K Kučera	1	1
(Argentina) J I Chela	6	6
(Argentina) D Nalbandian	6	6
Q	(Australia) W Arthurs	0	4
Q	(Australia) S Draper	6	3	6^{10}
3	(Switzerland) R Federer	4	6	7^{12}

Second round
(Belgium) X Malisse	5	7^{7}	1
(United States) M Fish	7	6^{5}	6
(France) A Clément	7^{7}	5	6
(United Kingdom) G Rusedski	6^{2}	7	2
13	(Chile) F González	2	4
(Argentina) J I Chela	6	6
(Argentina) D Nalbandian	7^{7}	7^{7}
3	(Switzerland) R Federer	6^{4}	6^{5}

Third round
(United States) M Fish	6	6
(France) A Clément	2	2
(Argentina) J I Chela	4	4
(Argentina) D Nalbandian	6	6

Quarterfinals
(United States) M Fish	7^{7}	6
(Argentina) D Nalbandian	6^{3}	3

==== Section 4 ====
First round
8	(Germany) R Schüttler	6	7
Q	(Austria) S Koubek	2	5
(Spain) F Vicente	5	6	4
(Finland) J Nieminen	7	3	6
WC	(United States) T Martin	6	6
(Argentina) J Acasuso	3	4
(Spain) F López	6^{1}	6	7^{7}
9	(Thailand) P Srichaphan	7^{7}	4	6^{5}
16	(Netherlands) M Verkerk	6	3	1
Q	(Israel) N Okun	3	6	6
(Czech Republic) R Štěpánek	1	6	0
(United States) R Ginepri	6	3	6
(Argentina) G Gaudio	6	6
Q	(United States) R Kendrick	4	4
(Russia) N Davydenko	0	2
2	(Spain) J C Ferrero	6	6

Second round
8	(Germany) R Schüttler	3	6	7^{7}
(Finland) J Nieminen	6	3	6^{4}
WC	(United States) T Martin	7^{7}	6
(Spain) F López	6^{3}	4
Q	(Israel) N Okun	6^{5}	4
(United States) R Ginepri	7^{7}	6
(Argentina) G Gaudio	6^{3}	7^{7}	6
2	(Spain) J C Ferrero	7^{7}	6^{5}	4

Third round
8	(Germany) R Schüttler	7	3	6
WC	(United States) T Martin	5	6	3
(United States) R Ginepri	6	7^{7}
(Argentina) G Gaudio	1	6^{4}

Quarterfinals
8	(Germany) R Schüttler	6	6
(United States) R Ginepri	2	3

== Qualifying ==
=== Qualifying seeds ===
1. (Chile) Nicolás Massú (qualifying competition)
2. (Armenia) Sargis Sargsian (qualifying competition)
3. (Spain) Alberto Martín (first round)
4. (France) Antony Dupuis (first round)
5. (Germany) Nicolas Kiefer (qualifying competition)
6. (Austria) Stefan Koubek (qualified)
7. (Croatia) Mario Ančić (first round)
8. (Morocco) Hicham Arazi (qualified)
9. (Italy) Davide Sanguinetti (first round)
10. (Australia) Wayne Arthurs (qualified)
11. (Romania) Victor Hănescu (qualifying competition)
12. (France) ~~Julien Boutter~~ (withdrew)
13. (Germany) Alexander Popp (qualifying competition)
14. (South Africa) Wesley Moodie (qualified)
15. (Australia) Scott Draper (qualified)
16. (United States) Robert Kendrick (qualified)

=== Qualifiers ===
1. (Israel) Noam Okun
2. (Australia) Wayne Arthurs
3. (Spain) Fernando Verdasco
4. (United States) Robert Kendrick
5. (Australia) Scott Draper
6. (Austria) Stefan Koubek
7. (South Africa) Wesley Moodie
8. (Morocco) Hicham Arazi

=== Qualifying draw ===
==== First qualifier ====
First round
1	(Chile) Nicolás Massú	6	6
WC	(United States) Rajeev Ram	4	4
WC	(Canada) Frank Dancevic	6	3	3
Alt	(Israel) Noam Okun	2	6	6

Qualifying competition
1	(Chile) Nicolás Massú	3	4
Alt	(Israel) Noam Okun	6	6

==== Second qualifier ====
First round
2	(Armenia) Sargis Sargsian	6	6
(Russia) Igor Kunitsyn	3	3
(Australia) Peter Luczak	2	4
10	(Australia) Wayne Arthurs	6	6

Qualifying competition
2	(Armenia) Sargis Sargsian	6	6^{4}	4
10	(Australia) Wayne Arthurs	2	7^{7}	6

==== Third qualifier ====
First round
3	(Spain) Alberto Martín	2	2
(Spain) Fernando Verdasco	6	6
WC	(India) Prakash Amritraj	7^{10}	1	4
13	(Germany) Alexander Popp	6^{8}	6	6

Qualifying competition
(Spain) Fernando Verdasco	6	6
13	(Germany) Alexander Popp	4	3

==== Fourth qualifier ====
First round
4	(France) Antony Dupuis	3	7^{7}	3
(United States) Jeff Salzenstein	6	6^{5}	6
(Switzerland) Ivo Heuberger	6^{2}	4
16	(United States) Robert Kendrick	7^{7}	6

Qualifying competition
(United States) Jeff Salzenstein	5	6	6^{4}
16	(United States) Robert Kendrick	7	4	7^{7}

==== Fifth qualifier ====
First round
5	(Germany) Nicolas Kiefer	6	6
WC	(United States) John Paul Fruttero	3	4
(Israel) Harel Levy	6^{4}	2
15	(Australia) Scott Draper	7^{7}	6

Qualifying competition
5	(Germany) Nicolas Kiefer	7	6^{7}	0
15	(Australia) Scott Draper	5	7^{9}	6

==== Sixth qualifier ====
First round
6	(Austria) Stefan Koubek	6	7
(Czech Republic) Jan Vacek	3	5
(Italy) Stefano Pescosolido	4	4
11	(Romania) Victor Hănescu	6	6

Qualifying competition
6	(Austria) Stefan Koubek	6	6
11	(Romania) Victor Hănescu	3	3

==== Seventh qualifier ====
First round
7	(Croatia) Mario Ančić	4	4
(Czech Republic) Jiří Vaněk	6	6
(France) Michaël Llodra	3	6	6^{5}
14	(South Africa) Wesley Moodie	6	3	7^{7}

Qualifying competition
(Czech Republic) Jiří Vaněk	6^{2}	4
14	(South Africa) Wesley Moodie	7^{7}	6

==== Eighth qualifier ====
First round
8	(Morocco) Hicham Arazi	7^{8}	7
(Paraguay) Ramón Delgado	6^{6}	5
(Czech Republic) Tomáš Zíb	6^{4}	7^{7}	6
9	(Italy) Davide Sanguinetti	7^{7}	6^{1}	3

Qualifying competition
8	(Morocco) Hicham Arazi	6	7^{7}
(Czech Republic) Tomáš Zíb	2	6^{5}
