= 2003 Western & Southern Financial Group Masters – Doubles =

Doubles
- 2003 Western & Southern Financial Group Masters

Final
- Champions: (United States) Bob Bryan (United States) Mike Bryan
- Runners-up: (Australia) Wayne Arthurs (Australia) Paul Hanley
- Score: 7–5, 7–6^{(7–5)}

Events
Singles	Doubles
← 2002 ·	Western & Southern Financial Group Masters	· 2004 →

James Blake and Todd Martin were the defending champions but lost in the second round to Wayne Arthurs and Paul Hanley.

Bob Bryan and Mike Bryan won in the final 7–5, 7–6^{(7–5)} against Arthurs and Hanley.

== Seeds ==
All eight seeded teams received byes to the second round.

1. (India) Mahesh Bhupathi / (Belarus) Max Mirnyi (semifinals)
2. (United States) Bob Bryan / (United States) Mike Bryan (champions)
3. (The Bahamas) Mark Knowles / (Canada) Daniel Nestor (semifinals)
4. (Sweden) Jonas Björkman / (Australia) Todd Woodbridge (quarterfinals)
5. (India) Leander Paes / (Czech Republic) David Rikl (second round)
6. (France) Michaël Llodra / (France) Fabrice Santoro (quarterfinals)
7. (Australia) Wayne Arthurs / (Australia) Paul Hanley (final)
8. (Czech Republic) Martin Damm / (Czech Republic) Cyril Suk (quarterfinals)

== Draw ==
=== Key ===
- Q = Qualifier
- WC = Wild card
- LL = Lucky loser
- Alt = Alternate
- ITF = ITF entry
- PR = Protected ranking
- SR = Special ranking
- SE = Special exempt
- JE = Junior exempt
- JR = Junior Accelerator Programme entrant
- CO = College Accelerator Programme entrant
- NG = Next Gen Accelerator Program entrant
- w/o = Walkover
- r = Retired
- d = Defaulted

=== Final ===
Semifinals

Final

1
- (India) Mahesh Bhupathi
- (Belarus) Max Mirnyi
5
7^{7}
3

7
- (Australia) Wayne Arthurs
- (Australia) Paul Hanley
7
6^{5}
6

7
- (Australia) Wayne Arthurs
- (Australia) Paul Hanley
5
6^{5}

2
- (United States) Bob Bryan
- (United States) Mike Bryan
7
7^{7}

3
- (The Bahamas) Mark Knowles
- (Canada) Daniel Nestor
2
3

2
- (United States) Bob Bryan
- (United States) Mike Bryan
6
6

=== Top half ===
First round

Second round

Quarterfinals

Semifinals

1
- (India) M Bhupathi
- (Belarus) M Mirnyi
6
3
6

- (Russia) Y Kafelnikov
- (Brazil) G Kuerten
3
7
7

- (Russia) Y Kafelnikov
- (Brazil) G Kuerten
3
6
1

- (Czech Republic) T Cibulec
- (Czech Republic) P Vízner
6
5
5

1
- (India) M Bhupathi
- (Belarus) M Mirnyi
7^{7}
6

- (Spain) J C Ferrero
- (Serbia and Montenegro) N Zimonjić
3
5

8
- (Czech Republic) M Damm
- (Czech Republic) C Suk
6^{4}
4

- (Australia) L Hewitt
- (Australia) M Philippoussis
6
7

- (Australia) L Hewitt
- (Australia) M Philippoussis

8
- (Czech Republic) M Damm
- (Czech Republic) C Suk
w/o

1
- (India) M Bhupathi
- (Belarus) M Mirnyi
5
7^{7}
3

7
- (Australia) W Arthurs
- (Australia) P Hanley
7
6^{5}
6

4
- (Sweden) J Björkman
- (Australia) T Woodbridge
6
1
6

- (Czech Republic) F Čermák
- (Czech Republic) L Friedl
7^{8}
6

- (Czech Republic) F Čermák
- (Czech Republic) L Friedl
1
6
2

- (Australia) J Eagle
- (United States) J Palmer
6^{6}
4

4
- (Sweden) J Björkman
- (Australia) T Woodbridge
6^{3}
6
3

- (Spain) T Robredo
- (Germany) R Schüttler
3
4

7
- (Australia) W Arthurs
- (Australia) P Hanley
7^{7}
4
6

WC
- (United States) J Blake
- (United States) T Martin
6
6

WC
- (United States) J Blake
- (United States) T Martin
4
5

7
- (Australia) W Arthurs
- (Australia) P Hanley
6
7

=== Bottom half ===
First round

Second round

Quarterfinals

Semifinals

6
- (France) M Llodra
- (France) F Santoro
w/o

- (Zimbabwe) W Black
- (Zimbabwe) K Ullyett
3
5

Alt
- (Croatia) I Ljubičić
- (Armenia) S Sargsian

Alt
- (Croatia) I Ljubičić
- (Armenia) S Sargsian
6
7

6
- (France) M Llodra
- (France) F Santoro
6
1
1

- (South Africa) D Adams
- (South Africa) R Koenig
3
5

3
- (The Bahamas) M Knowles
- (Canada) D Nestor
4
6
6

- (South Africa) C Haggard
- (United States) D Johnson
6
7

- (South Africa) C Haggard
- (United States) D Johnson
2
4

3
- (The Bahamas) M Knowles
- (Canada) D Nestor
6
6

3
- (The Bahamas) M Knowles
- (Canada) D Nestor
2
3

2
- (United States) B Bryan
- (United States) M Bryan
6
6

5
- (India) L Paes
- (Czech Republic) D Rikl
6^{3}
4

- (Argentina) G Etlis
- (Argentina) M Rodríguez
6
5
6

- (Argentina) G Etlis
- (Argentina) M Rodríguez
7^{7}
6

- (Netherlands) S Schalken
- (Netherlands) M Verkerk
4
7
0

- (Argentina) G Etlis
- (Argentina) M Rodríguez
1
4

- (Finland) J Nieminen
- (Thailand) P Srichaphan
6
1
7^{8}

2
- (United States) B Bryan
- (United States) M Bryan
6
6

WC
- (Spain) À Corretja
- (Spain) À Costa
4
6
6^{6}

- (Finland) J Nieminen
- (Thailand) P Srichaphan
3
2

2
- (United States) B Bryan
- (United States) M Bryan
6
6
