= 2003 French Open – Men's singles =

Men's singles
- 2003 French Open

Final
- Champion: (Spain) Juan Carlos Ferrero
- Runner-up: (Netherlands) Martin Verkerk
- Score: 6–1, 6–3, 6–2

Details
- Draw: 128
- Seeds: 32

Events
Singles	men	women		boys	girls
Doubles	men	women	mixed	boys	girls
WC Singles	men	women	quad
WC Doubles	men	women	quad
Legends	−45	45+	women
- French Open

Juan Carlos Ferrero defeated Martin Verkerk in the final, 6–1, 6–3, 6–2 to win the men's singles tennis title at the 2003 French Open. It was his only major singles title.

Albert Costa was the defending champion, but lost in the semifinals to Ferrero in a rematch of the previous year's final.

This tournament marked the final major appearance of former world No. 1 Marcelo Ríos, who retired in the first round against Mario Ančić, and the final French Open appearances of former champions Michael Chang and Yevgeny Kafelnikov.

== Seeds ==
1. (Australia) Lleyton Hewitt (third round)
2. (United States) Andre Agassi (quarterfinals)
3. (Spain) Juan Carlos Ferrero (champion)
4. (Spain) Carlos Moyà (quarterfinals)
5. (Switzerland) Roger Federer (first round)
6. (United States) Andy Roddick (first round)
7. (Argentina) Guillermo Coria (semifinals)
8. (Argentina) David Nalbandian (second round)
9. (Spain) Albert Costa (semifinals)
10. (Thailand) Paradorn Srichaphan (first round)
11. (Germany) Rainer Schüttler (fourth round)
12. (Netherlands) Sjeng Schalken (third round, retired because of a stomach ache)
13. (Czech Republic) Jiří Novák (fourth round)
14. (France) Sébastien Grosjean (second round)
15. (Brazil) Gustavo Kuerten (fourth round)
16. (Spain) Àlex Corretja (first round)

17. (Russia) Yevgeny Kafelnikov (second round)
18. (Argentina) Agustín Calleri (first round)
19. (Chile) Fernando González (quarterfinals)
20. (Spain) Félix Mantilla (fourth round)
21. (Argentina) Gastón Gaudio (third round)
22. (South Africa) Wayne Ferreira (third round, retired because of a groin injury)
23. (Morocco) Younes El Aynaoui (third round)
24. (United States) James Blake (second round)
25. (United Kingdom) Tim Henman (third round)
26. (Belgium) Xavier Malisse (third round)
27. (Russia) Mikhail Youzhny (second round)
28. (Spain) Tommy Robredo (quarterfinals)
29. (United States) Vince Spadea (third round)
30. (Finland) Jarkko Nieminen (fourth round)
31. (Argentina) Juan Ignacio Chela (third round)
32. (France) Arnaud Clément (fourth round)

Click on the seed number of a player to go to their draw section.

== Draw ==
Key

- Q = Qualifier
- WC = Wild card
- LL = Lucky loser
- Alt = Alternate
- ITF = ITF entry
- PR = Protected ranking
- SR = Special ranking
- SE = Special exempt
- JE = Junior exempt
- JR = Junior Accelerator Programme entrant
- CO = College Accelerator Programme entrant
- NG = Next Gen Accelerator Program entrant
- w/o = Walkover
- r = Retired
- d = Defaulted

=== Finals ===
Quarterfinals
28	(Spain) Tommy Robredo	6	6	4	5	2
9	(Spain) Albert Costa	2	3	6	7	6
3	(Spain) Juan Carlos Ferrero	6	3	6	5	6
19	(Chile) Fernando González	1	6	1	7	4
(Netherlands) Martin Verkerk	6	6	5	4	8
4	(Spain) Carlos Moyà	3	4	7	6	6
7	(Argentina) Guillermo Coria	4	6	6	6
2	(United States) Andre Agassi	6	3	2	4

Semifinals
9	(Spain) Albert Costa	3	6^{5}	4
3	(Spain) Juan Carlos Ferrero	6	7^{7}	6
(Netherlands) Martin Verkerk	7^{7}	6	7^{7}
7	(Argentina) Guillermo Coria	6^{4}	4	6^{0}

Final
3	(Spain) Juan Carlos Ferrero	6	6	6
(Netherlands) Martin Verkerk	1	3	2

=== Top half ===
==== Section 1 ====
First round
1	(Australia) L Hewitt	6	6	6^{6}	6
(United States) B Vahaly	4	1	7^{8}	3
(Russia) N Davydenko	6	7	6
(United Kingdom) G Rusedski	3	5	2
(Sweden) J Björkman	6	6	6
(Belarus) M Mirnyi	1	2	4
Q	(Ecuador) G Lapentti	6	6^{3}	6	1	r
28	(Spain) T Robredo	3	7^{7}	3	3
21	(Argentina) G Gaudio	7	6	6
(France) P-H Mathieu	5	3	3
(France) O Mutis	6	6^{5}	6	6
WC	(France) J Golmard	2	7^{7}	2	3
(Morocco) H Arazi	6	7^{7}	2	6
(Netherlands) R Sluiter	2	6^{3}	6	0
(Switzerland) M Rosset	2	7^{7}	3	6^{3}
15	(Brazil) G Kuerten	6	6^{3}	6	7^{7}

Second round
1	(Australia) L Hewitt	6	4	6	7^{7}
(Russia) N Davydenko	3	6	3	6^{5}
(Sweden) J Björkman	6^{2}	3	4
28	(Spain) T Robredo	7^{7}	6	6
21	(Argentina) G Gaudio	6	1	6	6
(France) O Mutis	2	6	2	2
(Morocco) H Arazi	1	0	1
15	(Brazil) G Kuerten	6	6	6

Third round
1	(Australia) L Hewitt	6	6	3	2	3
28	(Spain) T Robredo	4	1	6	6	6
21	(Argentina) G Gaudio	6^{1}	5	7	3
15	(Brazil) G Kuerten	7^{7}	7	5	6

Fourth round
28	(Spain) T Robredo	6	1	7^{7}	6
15	(Brazil) G Kuerten	4	6	6^{2}	4

==== Section 2 ====
First round
9	(Spain) A Costa	6^{3}	2	7	6	6
LL	(Argentina) S Roitman	7^{7}	6	5	2	2
(Australia) W Arthurs	1	6	1	6^{2}
(Czech Republic) R Štěpánek	6	4	6	7^{7}
WC	(France) R Gasquet	3	6^{4}	0	r
(Ecuador) N Lapentti	6	7^{7}	3
(Argentina) F Squillari	7	7^{7}	6
18	(Argentina) A Calleri	5	6^{2}	3
32	(France) A Clément	6	6	6
(Sweden) T Enqvist	3	4	2
(Germany) L Burgsmüller	7^{7}	6	4	6
(United States) M Fish	6^{3}	2	6	1
Q	(France) N Coutelot	6	6	6
(Italy) D Sanguinetti	3	3	4
(Spain) Á Montañés	4	3	6	5
8	(Argentina) D Nalbandian	6	6	3	7

Second round
9	(Spain) A Costa	6	5	6	3	6
(Czech Republic) R Štěpánek	3	7	4	6	4
(Ecuador) N Lapentti	4	6	6	6
(Argentina) F Squillari	6	1	4	3
32	(France) A Clément	6	6	6
(Germany) L Burgsmüller	3	3	3
Q	(France) N Coutelot	6	6	4	2	6
8	(Argentina) D Nalbandian	3	3	6	6	1

Third round
9	(Spain) A Costa	4	4	6	6	6
(Ecuador) N Lapentti	6	6	3	4	4
32	(France) A Clément	6	6	6
Q	(France) N Coutelot	4	3	2

Fourth round
9	(Spain) A Costa	6	7	7
32	(France) A Clément	2	5	5

==== Section 3 ====
First round
3	(Spain) JC Ferrero	7	7	6
(Switzerland) M Kratochvil	5	5	4
(Sweden) M Norman	4	1	3
(Chile) N Massú	6	6	6
(United States) T Martin	4	6	6	6
(Argentina) J Acasuso	6	3	4	2
(Belarus) V Voltchkov	2	3	1
25	(United Kingdom) T Henman	6	6	6
20	(Spain) F Mantilla	7^{7}	6	7^{7}
(South Korea) H-t Lee	6^{3}	4	6^{4}
(Belgium) O Rochus	6	6	1	1	3
Q	(Argentina) F Browne	4	2	6	6	6
Q	(Germany) A Waske	6	2	5	6	3
(Spain) F Vicente	3	6	7	1	6
(Romania) A Voinea	4	6^{3}	6	3
14	(France) S Grosjean	6	7^{7}	3	6

Second round
3	(Spain) JC Ferrero	6	3
(Chile) N Massú	2	0	r
(United States) T Martin	6^{5}	7	1	5
25	(United Kingdom) T Henman	7^{7}	5	6	7
20	(Spain) F Mantilla	6	4	6	6
Q	(Argentina) F Browne	3	6	3	1
(Spain) F Vicente	7^{7}	6	6
14	(France) S Grosjean	6^{3}	3	3

Third round
3	(Spain) JC Ferrero	4	6	6	6
25	(United Kingdom) T Henman	6	2	4	2
20	(Spain) F Mantilla	7^{7}	6	6
(Spain) F Vicente	6^{3}	3	3

Fourth round
3	(Spain) JC Ferrero	6	6	6
20	(Spain) F Mantilla	2	1	1

==== Section 4 ====
First round
12	(Netherlands) S Schalken	6	6	3	6
WC	(Australia) S Draper	2	4	6	4
WC	(United States) M Chang	5	1	1
(France) F Santoro	7	6	6
WC	(France) T Ascione	6	2	4	4
(Spain) A Portas	3	6	6	6
(United States) J-M Gambill	0	2	3
19	(Chile) F González	6	6	6
30	(Finland) J Nieminen	7^{7}	6^{4}	6	6
(France) N Escudé	6^{3}	7^{7}	3	1
Q	(France) J Varlet	6	4	6	7^{7}
(Denmark) K Carlsen	1	6	3	6^{5}
(France) M Llodra	4	3	2
Q	(Romania) V Hănescu	6	6	6
(Armenia) S Sargsian	6^{3}	6	6	6
6	(United States) A Roddick	7^{7}	1	2	4

Second round
12	(Netherlands) S Schalken	6	6	6
(France) F Santoro	1	3	4
(Spain) A Portas	3	6	4	2
19	(Chile) F González	6	4	6	6
30	(Finland) J Nieminen	1	1	7^{7}	6	6
Q	(France) J Varlet	6	6	6^{4}	2	4
Q	(Romania) V Hănescu	6	7	3	6
(Armenia) S Sargsian	3	5	6	2

Third round
12	(Netherlands) S Schalken	6^{4}	3	1^{r}
19	(Chile) F González	7^{7}	6	3
30	(Finland) J Nieminen	6^{1}	6	6	3	6
Q	(Romania) V Hănescu	7^{7}	4	2	6	3

Fourth round
19	(Chile) F González	6	6	6
30	(Finland) J Nieminen	3	3	2

=== Bottom half ===
==== Section 5 ====
First round
5	(Switzerland) R Federer	6^{6}	2	6^{3}
(Peru) L Horna	7^{8}	6	7^{7}
(Croatia) Z Krajan	3	4	4
(Netherlands) M Verkerk	6	6	6
(Netherlands) J van Lottum	6	3	2	6	6
Q	(Belgium) D Norman	3	6	6	3	4
(Georgia (country)) I Labadze	1	6	7	4	1
29	(United States) V Spadea	6	3	5	6	6
22	(South Africa) W Ferreira	6	6	6
(Germany) T Behrend	4	2	3
(Spain) D Ferrer	6	6	7^{7}
(Austria) J Melzer	2	2	6^{2}
(Monaco) J-R Lisnard	6	6	4	6
Q	(Argentina) M Delfino	1	4	6	4
(Philippines) C Mamiit	1	6	4	2
11	(Germany) R Schüttler	6	2	6	6

Second round
(Peru) L Horna	6	4	6	5	2
(Netherlands) M Verkerk	4	6	4	7	6
(Netherlands) J van Lottum	5	1	6	1
29	(United States) V Spadea	7	6	2	6
22	(South Africa) W Ferreira	4	6	6	6
(Spain) D Ferrer	6	4	1	3
(Monaco) J-R Lisnard	6	2	0	0
11	(Germany) R Schüttler	4	6	6	6

Third round
(Netherlands) M Verkerk	5	6	6	7
29	(United States) V Spadea	7	4	2	5
22	(South Africa) W Ferreira	3	6	6^{3}	3	r
11	(Germany) R Schüttler	6	1	7^{7}	2

Fourth round
(Netherlands) M Verkerk	6	6	7
11	(Germany) R Schüttler	3	3	5

==== Section 6 ====
First round
13	(Czech Republic) J Novák	6	6	6
WC	(France) J Benneteau	2	3	2
WC	(France) N Mahut	5	1	6^{5}
Q	(Spain) M López	7	6	7^{7}
(Slovakia) K Kučera	2	3	2
(Croatia) I Ljubičić	6	6	6
(United States) T Dent	4	3	6^{3}
24	(United States) J Blake	6	6	7^{7}
31	(Argentina) JI Chela	3	7^{7}	6	7
WC	(France) C Saulnier	6	6^{3}	3	5
LL	(Switzerland) I Heuberger	6^{5}	6	2	2
LL	(Italy) G Galimberti	7^{7}	4	6	6
(Australia) M Philippoussis	2	6^{1}	7	6	6
Q	(United States) A Kim	6	7^{7}	5	2	2
LL	(Italy) F Volandri	6^{7}	6	2	3
4	(Spain) C Moyá	7^{9}	4	6	6

Second round
13	(Czech Republic) J Novák	6	3	0	6	6
Q	(Spain) M López	4	6	6	1	3
(Croatia) I Ljubičić	6	4	7^{7}	6
24	(United States) J Blake	3	6	6^{2}	4
31	(Argentina) JI Chela	6	5	6	6
LL	(Italy) G Galimberti	2	7	2	1
(Australia) M Philippoussis	2	4	6^{7}
4	(Spain) C Moyá	6	6	7^{9}

Third round
13	(Czech Republic) J Novák	6	7	3	6
(Croatia) I Ljubičić	4	5	6	2
31	(Argentina) JI Chela	2	3	6	6	3
4	(Spain) C Moyà	6	6	3	2	6

Fourth round
13	(Czech Republic) J Novák	5	3	2
4	(Spain) C Moyà	7	6	6

==== Section 7 ====
First round
7	(Argentina) G Coria	6	6	6
(Brazil) A Sá	3	1	1
Q	(Australia) T Larkham	3	3	6	6	3
(Germany) N Kiefer	6	6	4	2	6
Q	(Hungary) A Sávolt	7	7^{7}	4	6
(Sweden) A Vinciguerra	5	6^{4}	6	0
(Spain) D Sánchez	3	0	0
27	(Russia) M Youzhny	6	6	6
23	(Morocco) Y El Aynaoui	6	6	6
(France) A Dupuis	4	4	4
Q	(Belgium) C Rochus	7	6	6
Q	(Chile) H Gamonal	5	3	3
(Argentina) M Zabaleta	6	7^{10}	6
(Spain) F López	2	6^{8}	0
(Slovakia) D Hrbatý	6	3	6	7
10	(Thailand) P Srichaphan	4	6	0	5

Second round
7	(Argentina) G Coria	6	5	6	6
(Germany) N Kiefer	3	7	3	1
Q	(Hungary) A Sávolt	3	6	5	6	6
27	(Russia) M Youzhny	6	4	7	2	4
23	(Morocco) Y El Aynaoui	6	6	6
Q	(Belgium) C Rochus	4	4	3
(Argentina) M Zabaleta	6	6	6
(Slovakia) D Hrbatý	2	4	2

Third round
7	(Argentina) G Coria	6	6	6
Q	(Hungary) A Sávolt	4	1	1
23	(Morocco) Y El Aynaoui	2	4	6	6^{2}
(Argentina) M Zabaleta	6	6	3	7^{7}

Fourth round
7	(Argentina) G Coria	6	7^{7}	5	6^{4}	6
(Argentina) M Zabaleta	4	6^{4}	7	7^{7}	3

==== Section 8 ====
First round
16	(Spain) À Corretja	7	3	0	5
Q	(Spain) G Blanco	5	6	6	7
(Argentina) M Puerta	6	4	7^{7}	6
(United States) J Gimelstob	2	6	6^{1}	1
(Brazil) F Saretta	7^{7}	6	6
(Spain) A Martín	6^{4}	0	0
(France) J Boutter	1	2	4
17	(Russia) Y Kafelnikov	6	6	6
26	(Belgium) X Malisse	7	6	6
Q	(Spain) Á Calatrava	5	4	2
(Austria) S Koubek	7	6	6
PR	(Germany) A Popp	5	2	3
(Chile) M Ríos	1	0^{r}
(Croatia) M Ančić	6	1
(Slovakia) K Beck	2	3	3
2	(United States) A Agassi	6	6	6

Second round
Q	(Spain) G Blanco	6	6	6
(Argentina) M Puerta	2	2	4
(Brazil) F Saretta	6	3	6	6^{0}	6
17	(Russia) Y Kafelnikov	4	6	0	7^{7}	4
26	(Belgium) X Malisse	3	4	6	7	8
(Austria) S Koubek	6	6	4	5	6
(Croatia) M Ančić	7	6	4	2	5
2	(United States) A Agassi	5	1	6	6	7

Third round
Q	(Spain) G Blanco	6^{3}	3	2	r
(Brazil) F Saretta	7^{7}	6	2
26	(Belgium) X Malisse	4	5	5
2	(United States) A Agassi	6	7	7

Fourth round
(Brazil) F Saretta	2	1	5
2	(United States) A Agassi	6	6	7

Preceded by 2003 Australian Open – Men's singles	Grand Slam men's singles	Succeeded by 2003 Wimbledon Championships – Men's singles
