= 2003 Australian Open – Men's singles =

Men's singles
- 2003 Australian Open

Final
- Champion: (United States) Andre Agassi
- Runner-up: (Germany) Rainer Schüttler
- Score: 6–2, 6–2, 6–1

Details
- Draw: 128
- Seeds: 32

Events
Singles	men	women		boys	girls
Doubles	men	women	mixed	boys	girls
WC Singles	men	women	quad
WC Doubles	men	women	quad
Legends	men	women	mixed
- Australian Open

Andre Agassi defeated Rainer Schüttler in the final, 6–2, 6–2, 6–1 to win the men's singles tennis title at the 2003 Australian Open. It was his fourth Australian Open title and his eighth and last major title overall. With the win, Agassi claimed his 21st consecutive match win at the Australian Open, after winning the title in 2000 and 2001 (he did not play in 2002 due to injury). At 32 years, 274 days old, Agassi was the oldest men’s major champion since Ken Rosewall at the 1972 Australian Open.

Thomas Johansson was the reigning champion, but did not participate due to injury.

Tim Henman and Greg Rusedski's withdrawals from the tournament marked the first time there were no British players competing in the Australian Open in the Open Era.

This event marked the first main-draw major appearance for future world No. 3 David Ferrer, who lost to Lee Hyung-taik in the first round; it also marked the final major appearance for former world No. 4 and 1996 Wimbledon champion Richard Krajicek, and the final Australian Open appearance of former world No. 1 and 1999 champion Yevgeny Kafelnikov. Both players were defeated in the second round, by Schüttler and Jarkko Nieminen, respectively.

== Seeds ==
The seeded players are listed below. Andre Agassi is the champion; others show the round in which they were eliminated.

1. (Australia) Lleyton Hewitt (fourth round)
2. (United States) Andre Agassi (champion)
3. (Russia) Marat Safin (third round, withdrew)
4. (Spain) Juan Carlos Ferrero (quarterfinals)
5. (Spain) Carlos Moyá (second round)
6. (Switzerland) Roger Federer (fourth round)
7. (Czech Republic) Jiří Novák (third round)
8. (Spain) Albert Costa (third round)
9. (United States) Andy Roddick (semifinals)
10. (Argentina) David Nalbandian (quarterfinals)
11. (Thailand) Paradorn Srichaphan (second round)
12. (France) Sébastien Grosjean (quarterfinals)
13. (Chile) Fernando González (second round)
14. (Argentina) Guillermo Cañas (second round)
15. (Spain) Àlex Corretja (first round)
16. (Netherlands) Sjeng Schalken (second round)
17. (Argentina) Gastón Gaudio (second round)
18. (Morocco) Younes El Aynaoui (quarterfinals)
19. (Argentina) Juan Ignacio Chela (second round)
20. (Belgium) Xavier Malisse (third round)
21. (Romania) Andrei Pavel (first round, retired)
22. (Russia) Yevgeny Kafelnikov (second round)
23. (United States) James Blake (fourth round)
24. (Ecuador) Nicolás Lapentti (third round)
25. (Russia) Mikhail Youzhny (fourth round)
26. (Spain) Tommy Robredo (first round)
27. (United States) Jan-Michael Gambill (second round)
28. (France) Fabrice Santoro (third round)
29. (France) Nicolas Escudé (third round)
30. (Brazil) Gustavo Kuerten (second round)
31. (Germany) Rainer Schüttler (final)
32. (Austria) Stefan Koubek (first round)

== Draw ==
Key

- Q = Qualifier
- WC = Wild card
- LL = Lucky loser
- Alt = Alternate
- ITF = ITF entry
- PR = Protected ranking
- SR = Special ranking
- SE = Special exempt
- JE = Junior exempt
- JR = Junior Accelerator Programme entrant
- CO = College Accelerator Programme entrant
- NG = Next Gen Accelerator Program entrant
- w/o = Walkover
- r = Retired
- d = Defaulted

=== Finals ===
Quarterfinals
18	(Morocco) Younes El Aynaoui	6	6^{5}	6	4	19
9	(United States) Andy Roddick	4	7^{7}	4	6	21
31	(Germany) Rainer Schüttler	6	5	6	6
10	(Argentina) David Nalbandian	3	7	1	0
(South Africa) Wayne Ferreira	7^{7}	7^{7}	6
4	(Spain) Juan Carlos Ferrero	6^{4}	6^{5}	1
12	(France) Sébastien Grosjean	3	2	2
2	(United States) Andre Agassi	6	6	6

Semifinals
9	(United States) Andy Roddick	5	6	3	3
31	(Germany) Rainer Schüttler	7	2	6	6
(South Africa) Wayne Ferreira	2	2	3
2	(United States) Andre Agassi	6	6	6

Final
31	(Germany) Rainer Schüttler	2	2	1
2	(United States) Andre Agassi	6	6	6

=== Top draw ===
==== Section 1 ====
First round
1	(Australia) L Hewitt	6	3	6	6^{3}	6
Q	(Sweden) M Larsson	3	6	1	7^{7}	2
(Philippines) C Mamiit	7^{7}	3	6^{5}	4
Q	(Australia) T Larkham	6^{5}	6	7^{7}	6
(Denmark) K Carlsen	0	5	1
(Czech Republic) R Štěpánek	6	7	6
(Morocco) H Arazi	4	6^{8}	3
30	(Brazil) G Kuerten	6	7^{10}	6
18	(Morocco) Y El Aynaoui	2	4	6	1
(United States) J Gimelstob	6	6	4	0^{r}
Q	(Uzbekistan) V Kutsenko	6	6	1	4	6
(Croatia) I Ljubičić	3	4	6	6	3
(United States) R Ginepri	6	6	6
(Switzerland) M Rosset	3	4	2
(Spain) F López	6^{3}	7^{11}	7^{8}	6
15	(Spain) À Corretja	7^{7}	6^{9}	6^{6}	3

Second round
1	(Australia) L Hewitt	6	6	6
Q	(Australia) T Larkham	1	0	1
(Czech Republic) R Štěpánek	5	6	7	4	6
30	(Brazil) G Kuerten	7	3	5	6	3
18	(Morocco) Y El Aynaoui	6	6	6
Q	(Uzbekistan) V Kutsenko	2	1	4
(United States) R Ginepri	2	4	2
(Spain) F López	6	6	6

Third round
1	(Australia) L Hewitt	6	6	6
(Czech Republic) R Štěpánek	3	2	0
18	(Morocco) Y El Aynaoui	5	6	7^{7}	7^{10}
(Spain) F López	7	2	6^{3}	6^{8}

Fourth round
1	(Australia) L Hewitt	7^{7}	6^{4}	6^{5}	4
18	(Morocco) Y El Aynaoui	6^{4}	7^{7}	7^{7}	6

==== Section 2 ====
First round
9	(United States) A Roddick	6^{9}	6	7^{7}	6
(Croatia) Ž Krajan	7^{11}	2	6^{0}	3
(Brazil) A Sá	2	6^{2}	4
(Romania) A Voinea	6	7^{7}	6
(Peru) L Horna	6	6	3	6^{3}	1
(Spain) F Vicente	3	4	6	7^{7}	6
(Slovakia) K Beck	4	6	1	0
19	(Argentina) JI Chela	6	3	6	6
25	(Russia) M Youzhny	3	6	6	6
WC	(France) R Gasquet	6	0	1	4
WC	(Australia) J Sirianni	6	6	6
(Belarus) M Mirnyi	3	4	4
(Belgium) O Rochus	4	4	6	6	6
(France) A Di Pasquale	6	6	3	3	4
(United States) V Spadea	2	6	2	6^{3}
7	(Czech Republic) J Novák	6	2	6	7^{7}

Second round
9	(United States) A Roddick	6	6	6
(Romania) A Voinea	2	2	2
(Spain) F Vicente	6	6	2	6
19	(Argentina) JI Chela	3	3	6	3
25	(Russia) M Youzhny	6	6	6
WC	(Australia) J Sirianni	2	3	3
(Belgium) O Rochus	6^{3}	6^{5}	6	6	3
7	(Czech Republic) J Novák	7^{7}	7^{7}	4	4	6

Third round
9	(United States) A Roddick	6	6	6
(Spain) F Vicente	2	3	2
25	(Russia) M Youzhny	6	3	6	6
7	(Czech Republic) J Novák	1	6	3	2

Fourth round
9	(United States) A Roddick	6^{4}	3	7	6	6
25	(Russia) M Youzhny	7^{7}	6	5	3	2

==== Section 3 ====
First round
3	(Russia) M Safin	6	4	6	6
(Netherlands) R Sluiter	4	6	3	4
(Spain) A Montañés	6	6	6
(Argentina) M Puerta	2	4	4
WC	(Australia) T Reid	6	2	2	1
PR	(Netherlands) R Krajicek	3	6	6	6
(Spain) A Portas	3	2	0
31	(Germany) R Schüttler	6	6	6
23	(United States) J Blake	7^{7}	6	6
(Czech Republic) J Vaněk	6^{2}	4	4
LL	(France) G Carraz	7	3^{r}
(Argentina) J Acasuso	5	4
(Spain) A Martín	6	6	6^{3}	4	6
Q	(United States) A Bogomolov Jr.	2	4	7^{7}	6	1
Q	(France) J Varlet	2	6	6	3	4
13	(Chile) F González	6	3	4	6	6

Second round
3	(Russia) M Safin	6	4	6	6
(Spain) A Montañés	3	6	4	1
PR	(Netherlands) R Krajicek	3	5	4
31	(Germany) R Schüttler	6	7	6
23	(United States) J Blake	6	6	6
(Argentina) J Acasuso	1	4	4
(Spain) A Martín	6^{5}	6	6	7^{7}
13	(Chile) F González	7^{7}	3	1	6^{4}

Third round
3	(Russia) M Safin
31	(Germany) R Schüttler	w/o
23	(United States) J Blake	6	4	6	6
(Spain) A Martín	3	6	2	2

Fourth round
31	(Germany) R Schüttler	6	6	1	6
23	(United States) J Blake	3	4	6	3

==== Section 4 ====
First round
10	(Argentina) D Nalbandian	3	6	6	0
(France) J Golmard	6	3	1	0^{r}
Q	(Australia) J Crabb	6	3	7^{7}	6
WC	(Australia) A Ilie	3	6	6^{3}	4
(France) A Dupuis	6	6	6
(Spain) J Díaz	4	3	3
(Slovakia) D Hrbatý	2	3	2
20	(Belgium) X Malisse	6	6	6
32	(Austria) S Koubek	4	4	1
Q	(Sweden) A Vinciguerra	6	6	6
(Austria) J Knowle	5	6	6	7
WC	(Australia) R Henry	7	4	2	5
(Germany) L Burgsmüller	6	7	7
(Spain) J Balcells	4	5	5
(Brazil) F Saretta	6^{4}	5	3
6	(Switzerland) R Federer	7^{7}	7	6

Second round
10	(Argentina) D Nalbandian	6	7^{7}	6
Q	(Australia) J Crabb	1	6^{3}	3
(France) A Dupuis	3	7	6^{6}	5
20	(Belgium) X Malisse	6	5	7^{8}	7
Q	(Sweden) A Vinciguerra	6	0
(Austria) J Knowle	2	1^{r}
(Germany) L Burgsmüller	3	0	3
6	(Switzerland) R Federer	6	6	6

Third round
10	(Argentina) D Nalbandian	4	6	6	3
20	(Belgium) X Malisse	6	2	0	0^{r}
Q	(Sweden) A Vinciguerra	3	4	2
6	(Switzerland) R Federer	6	6	6

Fourth round
10	(Argentina) D Nalbandian	6	3	6	1	6
6	(Switzerland) R Federer	4	6	1	6	3

=== Bottom draw ===
==== Section 5 ====
First round
5	(Spain) C Moyá	7	6	6
(Belgium) D Norman	5	3	4
Q	(Sweden) J Johansson	3	5	2
(United States) M Fish	6	7	6
(Italy) D Sanguinetti	3	0	3
(Switzerland) M Kratochvil	6	6	6
(South Africa) W Ferreira	5	6	6	6
26	(Spain) T Robredo	7	0	3	4
17	(Argentina) G Gaudio	7	7	6
(Sweden) T Enqvist	5	5	2
(Argentina) A Calleri	4	6	6^{4}	0
(Armenia) S Sargsian	6	3	7^{7}	6
(Australia) M Philippoussis	6	6	6^{5}	6
(Netherlands) M Verkerk	4	4	7^{7}	3
(Austria) J Melzer	5	4	6	0
11	(Thailand) P Srichaphan	7	6	1	6

Second round
5	(Spain) C Moyá	6	6^{8}	4	6	2
(United States) M Fish	3	7^{10}	6	4	6
(Switzerland) M Kratochvil	2	2	5
(South Africa) W Ferreira	6	6	7
17	(Argentina) G Gaudio	6	5	2	2
(Armenia) S Sargsian	2	7	6	6
(Australia) M Philippoussis	3	6	1	7	6
11	(Thailand) P Srichaphan	6	1	6	5	3

Third round
(United States) M Fish	6	6	1	4	0
(South Africa) W Ferreira	2	3	6	6	6
(Armenia) S Sargsian	5	7	6	6
(Australia) M Philippoussis	7	5	0	4

Fourth round
(South Africa) W Ferreira	6	6	3	6
(Armenia) S Sargsian	3	4	6	3

==== Section 6 ====
First round
16	(Netherlands) S Schalken	6	6	7^{7}
Q	(United States) J Brasington	4	2	6^{5}
(Croatia) M Ančić	6	6	7^{7}
Q	(Germany) A Waske	3	4	6^{4}
(Hungary) A Sávolt	5	2	4
WC	(Australia) P Luczak	7	6	6
Q	(Italy) R Furlan	4
21	(Romania) A Pavel	1^{r}
28	(France) F Santoro	6	6	6
Q	(Germany) B Phau	4	3	4
(Australia) W Arthurs	6^{5}	3	7^{7}	6	6
Q	(Brazil) M Daniel	7^{7}	6	6^{5}	4	4
(Italy) A Gaudenzi	4	6	1	6	1
(France) J-R Lisnard	6	2	6	4	6
(Argentina) F Squillari	6^{5}	6	2	3
4	(Spain) JC Ferrero	7^{7}	3	6	6

Second round
16	(Netherlands) S Schalken	3	6	7^{12}	4	4
(Croatia) M Ančić	6	1	6^{10}	6	6
WC	(Australia) P Luczak	7^{7}	4	6	6
Q	(Italy) R Furlan	6^{2}	6	0	2
28	(France) F Santoro	6	6	0
(Australia) W Arthurs	3	1	0^{r}
(France) J-R Lisnard	0	4	2
4	(Spain) JC Ferrero	6	6	6

Third round
(Croatia) M Ančić	2	7^{7}	6	6
WC	(Australia) P Luczak	6	6^{2}	4	2
28	(France) F Santoro	6	3	6	2	5
4	(Spain) JC Ferrero	4	6	4	6	7

Fourth round
(Croatia) M Ančić	0	3	2
4	(Spain) JC Ferrero	6	6	6

==== Section 7 ====
First round
8	(Spain) A Costa	6	6	3	7^{7}
Q	(Germany) D Prinosil	4	1	6	6^{5}
WC	(Australia) S Draper	7	6	3	6
(United States) A Kim	5	3	6	3
(Spain) F Mantilla	4	7	6	4	6
(Argentina) M Zabaleta	6	5	3	6	4
(France) M Llodra	2	5	7^{7}	6	2
27	(United States) J-M Gambill	6	7	6^{3}	4	6
24	(Ecuador) N Lapentti	6	6	6
Q	(France) J Benneteau	0	4	0
(Spain) D Sánchez	5	6	1	6	10
(Denmark) K Pless	7	3	6	4	8
(Czech Republic) J Vacek	2	1	4
(Slovakia) K Kučera	6	6	6
(Brazil) F Meligeni	4	2	3
12	(France) S Grosjean	6	6	6

Second round
8	(Spain) A Costa	6	6^{9}	6	6
WC	(Australia) S Draper	4	7^{11}	2	3
(Spain) F Mantilla	5	6	4	6	6
27	(United States) J-M Gambill	7	4	6	3	2
24	(Ecuador) N Lapentti	6	6	2	6
(Spain) D Sánchez	1	0	6	2
(Slovakia) K Kučera	6^{2}	6	3	6^{1}
12	(France) S Grosjean	7^{7}	2	6	7^{7}

Third round
8	(Spain) A Costa	6	3	6	1	3
(Spain) F Mantilla	3	6	4	6	6
24	(Ecuador) N Lapentti	1	3	3
12	(France) S Grosjean	6	6	6

Fourth round
(Spain) F Mantilla	6	6	3	3	3
12	(France) S Grosjean	3	2	6	6	6

==== Section 8 ====
First round
14	(Argentina) G Cañas	6	7	6
(Belarus) V Voltchkov	3	5	3
(Argentina) G Coria	6	7	6
(Spain) F Clavet	4	5	1
(Finland) J Nieminen	6	3	3	6	7
(Russia) N Davydenko	3	6	6	2	5
(United States) J Morrison	6^{5}	3	6	3
22	(Russia) Y Kafelnikov	7^{7}	6	4	6
29	(France) N Escudé	6	2	6	6
WC	(Japan) G Motomura	1	6	3	2
Q	(Belgium) C Rochus	6	6	6
(Georgia (country)) I Labadze	2	3	4
(Spain) D Ferrer	7	2	2	3
(South Korea) H-t Lee	5	6	6	6
(United States) B Vahaly	5	3	3
2	(United States) A Agassi	7	6	6

Second round
14	(Argentina) G Cañas	2	6	4	4
(Argentina) G Coria	6	4	6	6
(Finland) J Nieminen	6	6	3	4	6
22	(Russia) Y Kafelnikov	3	3	6	6	1
29	(France) N Escudé	1	6	6	6
Q	(Belgium) C Rochus	6	2	2	4
(South Korea) H-t Lee	1	0	0
2	(United States) A Agassi	6	6	6

Third round
(Argentina) G Coria	7	6	6
(Finland) J Nieminen	5	2	2
29	(France) N Escudé	2	6	3	4
2	(United States) A Agassi	6	3	6	6

Fourth round
(Argentina) G Coria	1	1^{r}
2	(United States) A Agassi	6	3

== Other entry information ==
=== Wild cards ===
- (Australia) Scott Draper
- (France) Richard Gasquet
- (Australia) Ryan Henry
- (Australia) Andrew Ilie
- (Australia) Peter Luczak
- (Japan) Gouichi Motomura
- (Australia) Todd Reid
- (Australia) Joseph Sirianni

=== Protected ranking ===
- (Netherlands) Richard Krajicek (40)

=== Qualifiers ===
- (France) Julien Benneteau
- (United States) Alex Bogomolov Jr.
- (United States) Jack Brasington
- (Australia) Jaymon Crabb
- (Brazil) Marcos Daniel
- (Italy) Renzo Furlan
- (Sweden) Joachim Johansson
- (Uzbekistan) Vadim Kutsenko
- (Australia) Todd Larkham
- (Sweden) Magnus Larsson
- (Germany) Björn Phau
- (Germany) David Prinosil
- (Belgium) Christophe Rochus
- (France) Julien Varlet
- (Sweden) Andreas Vinciguerra
- (Germany) Alexander Waske

=== Lucky losers ===
- (France) Grégory Carraz

=== Withdrawals ===
Before the tournament

- (France) Arnaud Clément (38) → replaced by (France) Jean-René Lisnard (105)
- (Germany) Nicolas Kiefer (72) → replaced by (United States) Justin Gimelstob (106)
- (Germany) Tommy Haas (11) → replaced by (Sweden) Magnus Norman (107)
- (Sweden) Thomas Johansson (14) → replaced by (Croatia) Željko Krajan (108)
- (France) Paul-Henri Mathieu (36) → replaced by (Spain) Juan Balcells (109)
- (France) Olivier Mutis (94) → replaced by (Czech Republic) Jan Vacek (110)
- (France) Julien Boutter (78) → replaced by (Philippines) Cecil Mamiit (111)
- (United States) Todd Martin (47) → replaced by (Spain) Francisco Clavet (113)
- (United Kingdom) Tim Henman (8) → replaced by (Argentina) Mariano Puerta (115)
- (United States) Taylor Dent (57) → replaced by (Slovakia) Karol Beck (116)
- (Chile) Nicolás Massú (56) → replaced by (United States) Alex Kim (117)
- (United Kingdom) Greg Rusedski (31) → replaced by (Italy) Andrea Gaudenzi (119)
- (Czech Republic) Bohdan Ulihrach (76) → replaced by (Austria) Julian Knowle (120) (Note: Last direct acceptance)
- (Sweden) Jonas Björkman (48) → replaced by (France) Grégory Carraz (LL)

During the tournament

- (Russia) Marat Safin

== Notes ==
Preceded by 2002 US Open – Men's singles	Grand Slam men's singles	Succeeded by 2003 French Open – Men's singles
