= 2004 Monte Carlo Masters – Singles =

Singles
- 2004 Monte Carlo Masters

Final
- Champion: (Argentina) Guillermo Coria
- Runner-up: (Germany) Rainer Schüttler
- Score: 6–2, 6–1, 6–3

Details
- Draw: 64 (8 Q / 4 WC )
- Seeds: 16

Events
Singles	Doubles
← 2003 ·	Monte Carlo Masters	· 2005 →

Guillermo Coria defeated Rainer Schüttler in the final, 6–2, 6–1, 6–3 to win the singles tennis title at the 2004 Monte Carlo Masters.

Juan Carlos Ferrero was the two-time defending champion, but lost in the first round to Àlex Corretja.

== Seeds ==
1. (United States) ~~Andy Roddick~~ (withdrew)
2. (Spain) Juan Carlos Ferrero (first round)
3. (Argentina) Guillermo Coria (champion)
4. (Germany) Rainer Schüttler (final)
5. (Spain) Carlos Moyá (semifinals)
6. (United Kingdom) Tim Henman (quarterfinals)
7. (Argentina) David Nalbandian (quarterfinals)
8. (France) Sébastien Grosjean (second round)
9. (Chile) Nicolás Massú (third round)
10. (Thailand) Paradorn Srichaphan (first round)
11. (Netherlands) Sjeng Schalken (first round)
12. (Czech Republic) Jiří Novák (first round)
13. (Chile) Fernando González (first round)
14. (Netherlands) Martin Verkerk (second round)
15. (United States) ~~Mardy Fish~~ (withdrew)
16. (Australia) Lleyton Hewitt (third round)

== Draw ==
=== Key ===
- Q = Qualifier
- WC = Wild card
- LL = Lucky loser
- Alt = Alternate
- SE = Special exempt
- PR = Protected ranking
- ITF = ITF entry
- JE = Junior exempt
- w/o = Walkover
- r = Retired
- d = Defaulted
- SR = Special ranking

=== Finals ===
Quarterfinals
(Russia) Marat Safin	6	3	6
(Spain) Alberto Martín	3	6	1
3	(Argentina) Guillermo Coria	6	6
7	(Argentina) David Nalbandian	4	3
6	(United Kingdom) Tim Henman	3	1
4	(Germany) Rainer Schüttler	6	6
5	(Spain) Carlos Moyá	6	7^{7}
(Russia) Nikolay Davydenko	4	6^{4}

Semifinals
(Russia) Marat Safin	4	6	3
3	(Argentina) Guillermo Coria	6	1	6
4	(Germany) Rainer Schüttler	7^{7}	6
5	(Spain) Carlos Moyá	6^{5}	4

Final
3	(Argentina) Guillermo Coria	6	6	6
4	(Germany) Rainer Schüttler	2	1	3

=== Top half ===
==== Section 1 ====
First round
LL	(Australia) W Arthurs	7^{7}	6
Q	(France) T Ascione	6^{5}	4
(Croatia) G Ivanišević	6	2	2
Q	(France) N Devilder	4	6	6
(Belgium) O Rochus	6	3	3
(Russia) M Safin	4	6	6
(Belarus) M Mirnyi	6	6
13	(Chile) F González	4	3
11	(Netherlands) S Schalken	1	3
(Argentina) A Calleri	6	6
WC	(France) N Escudé	6	6
(France) G Carraz	4	2
(Argentina) G Cañas	3	6	3
(Spain) A Martín	6	4	6
(France) A Clément	4	2
8	(France) S Grosjean	6	6

Second round
LL	(Australia) W Arthurs	4	6	6
Q	(France) N Devilder	6	3	4
(Russia) M Safin	6	6
(Belarus) M Mirnyi	4	3
(Argentina) A Calleri	6	6
WC	(France) N Escudé	2	3
(Spain) A Martín	6	6
8	(France) S Grosjean	4	2

Third round
LL	(Australia) W Arthurs	4	2
(Russia) M Safin	6	6
(Argentina) A Calleri	3	6	6^{1}
(Spain) A Martín	6	3	7^{7}

Quarterfinals
(Russia) M Safin	6	3	6
(Spain) A Martín	3	6	1

==== Section 2 ====
First round
3	(Argentina) G Coria	6	6
Q	(Sweden) T Enqvist	0	1
(Germany) N Kiefer	6	6
(Morocco) H Arazi	3	3
(Czech Republic) R Štěpánek	3	3
(Romania) A Pavel	6	6
(Sweden) J Björkman	6	3	7
LL	(France) N Mahut	1	6	5
12	(Czech Republic) J Novák	4	5
(United States) T Dent	6	7
Q	(Russia) I Andreev	3	6^{3}
WC	(France) F Santoro	6	7^{7}
(Spain) A Costa	4	5
(Spain) F Mantilla	6	7
(Slovakia) D Hrbatý	3	0
7	(Argentina) D Nalbandian	6	6

Second round
3	(Argentina) G Coria	6	6
(Germany) N Kiefer	0	3
(Romania) A Pavel	6	6
(Sweden) J Björkman	2	0
(United States) T Dent	3	2
WC	(France) F Santoro	6	6
(Spain) F Mantilla	0	7	6^{4}
7	(Argentina) D Nalbandian	6	5	7^{7}

Third round
3	(Argentina) G Coria	4	6	6
(Romania) A Pavel	6	1	4
WC	(France) F Santoro	3	2
7	(Argentina) D Nalbandian	6	6

Quarterfinals
3	(Argentina) G Coria	6	6
7	(Argentina) D Nalbandian	4	3

=== Bottom half ===
==== Section 3 ====
First round
6	(United Kingdom) T Henman	6^{5}	6	7^{7}
(United States) V Spadea	7^{7}	4	6^{5}
(Spain) D Sánchez	6	6
Q	(Czech Republic) B Ulihrach	1	4
(Spain) F López	7	6
(Sweden) R Söderling	5	4
(Brazil) F Saretta	3	0
9	(Chile) N Massú	6	6
16	(Australia) L Hewitt	3	6	6
WC	(France) J Benneteau	6	3	4
(Argentina) G Gaudio	4	7	6
(Italy) F Volandri	6	5	4
Q	(Czech Republic) T Berdych	5	3
Q	(Monaco) J-R Lisnard	7	6
(Brazil) G Kuerten	6^{3}	3
4	(Germany) R Schüttler	7^{7}	6

Second round
6	(United Kingdom) T Henman	6	6^{8}	6
(Spain) D Sánchez	3	7^{10}	3
(Spain) F López	2	4
9	(Chile) N Massú	6	6
16	(Australia) L Hewitt	1	7^{7}	6
(Argentina) G Gaudio	6	6^{5}	1
Q	(Monaco) J-R Lisnard	1	2
4	(Germany) R Schüttler	6	6

Third round
6	(United Kingdom) T Henman	3	6	6
9	(Chile) N Massú	6	4	3
16	(Australia) L Hewitt	4	6	4
4	(Germany) R Schüttler	6	3	6

Quarterfinals
6	(United Kingdom) T Henman	3	1
4	(Germany) R Schüttler	6	6

==== Section 4 ====
First round
5	(Spain) C Moyá	7^{7}	1	6
(Armenia) S Sargsian	6^{5}	6	3
(Finland) J Nieminen	6	3	6
Q	(Italy) U Vico	4	6	4
(Belgium) X Malisse	3	4
(Germany) T Haas	6	6
(Argentina) J I Chela	6	6
10	(Thailand) P Srichaphan	4	3
14	(Netherlands) M Verkerk	4	6	6
LL	(Spain) A Portas	6	4	3
(Croatia) I Ljubičić	6	7^{7}
(Spain) T Robredo	4	6^{2}
(Russia) N Davydenko	6	6
(Argentina) M Zabaleta	2	4
WC	(Spain) À Corretja	6	6
2	(Spain) J C Ferrero	2	3

Second round
5	(Spain) C Moyá	w/o
(Finland) J Nieminen
(Germany) T Haas	4	6	3
(Argentina) J I Chela	6	1	6
14	(Netherlands) M Verkerk	3	2
(Croatia) I Ljubičić	6	6
(Russia) N Davydenko	6	6
WC	(Spain) À Corretja	2	1

Third round
5	(Spain) C Moyá	6	7^{7}
(Argentina) J I Chela	4	6^{4}
(Croatia) I Ljubičić	2	2
(Russia) N Davydenko	6	6

Quarterfinals
5	(Spain) C Moyá	6	7^{7}
(Russia) N Davydenko	4	6^{4}
