= Rainer Schüttler =

German tennis player

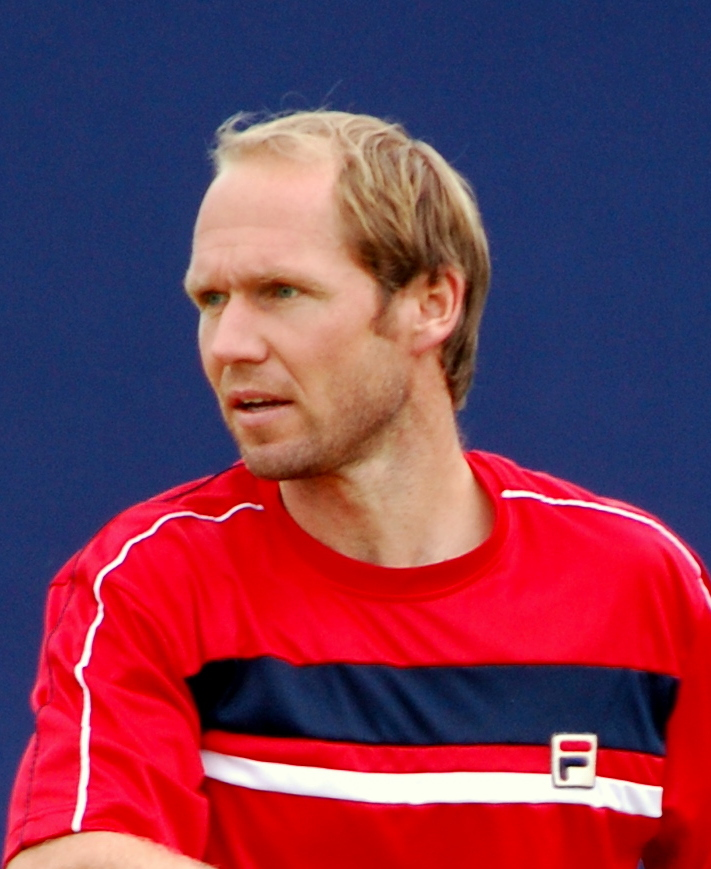
- Schüttler at the 2011 Queen's Club
- ITF name: Rainer Schuettler
- Country (sports): Germany
- Residence: Altstätten, Switzerland
- Born: 25 April 1976 (age 50) Korbach, West Germany
- Height: 1.80 m (5 ft 11 in)
- Turned pro: 1995
- Retired: 2012
- Plays: Right-handed (two-handed backhand)
- Prize money: $7,407,508

Singles
- Career record: 327–337 (49.2%)
- Career titles: 4
- Highest ranking: No. 5 (26 April 2004)

Grand Slam singles results
- Australian Open: F (2003)
- French Open: 4R (2003)
- Wimbledon: SF (2008)
- US Open: 4R (2003)

Other tournaments
- Tour Finals: SF (2003)
- Olympic Games: 2R (2000, 2008)

Doubles
- Career record: 124–172 (41.9%)
- Career titles: 4
- Highest ranking: No. 40 (11 July 2005)

Grand Slam doubles results
- Australian Open: 2R (2004, 2007, 2010, 2011)
- French Open: QF (2007)
- Wimbledon: QF (2005)
- US Open: 2R (2003, 2004, 2006, 2007, 2008)

Other doubles tournaments
- Olympic Games: Silver medal (2004)

Grand Slam mixed doubles results
- Wimbledon: QF (2004)
Medal record
Representing Germany
Olympic Games
Silver medal – second place	2004 Athens	Doubles

Rainer Schüttler (German pronunciation: [ˈraɪnɐ ˈʃʏtlɐ]; born 25 April 1976) is a German former professional tennis player. Schüttler was the runner-up at the 2003 Australian Open and a semifinalist at the 2008 Wimbledon Championships. He won an Olympic silver medal in doubles at the 2004 Athens Olympics, and achieved a career-high ranking of world No. 5 in April 2004.

== Early life ==
He began playing tennis at the age of nine. He resides in Switzerland.

== Career ==
=== 2003–2009 ===
In 2003, Schüttler became the first German since Boris Becker in 1989 to advance to the fourth round at all Grand Slam tournaments. He became the first German to reach a Grand Slam final, at the Australian Open, since Michael Stich was the runner-up at Roland Garros in 1996. En route to the final, which he lost in straight sets to Andre Agassi, he defeated Andy Roddick who would end the season as world No 1.

In 2004, Schüttler reached his first career ATP Masters Series final in Monte Carlo by beating Gustavo Kuerten in the first round, Lleyton Hewitt in the third round, Tim Henman in the quarterfinal and Carlos Moyá in the semifinal. In the final, he lost to Guillermo Coria. That week, he would reach a career-high ranking of No. 5. Schüttler won a silver medal for Germany in men's doubles with partner Nicolas Kiefer at the 2004 Summer Olympics in Athens. 2004 was the sixth straight year in which he finished in the ATP top 50.

Schüttler reached his first career semifinal at Wimbledon by beating Santiago Ventura, James Blake, Guillermo García López, Janko Tipsarević, and Arnaud Clément. His five set match with Clément was over five hours, completed in two days to reach the semifinals, in which Schuettler saved a match point at 6–5 down in the fifth set. He was defeated by eventual champion Rafael Nadal in straight sets. His achievement was a big surprise, since he entered the tournament ranked 94th and with a streak of 13 consecutive Grand Slam tournaments without making it past the second round.

His 2009 season Schüttler started off at the Chennai Open, beating Prakash Amritraj. In the second round, he beat Simon Greul and in the quarterfinals Björn Phau. Unfortunately Schuettler had to withdraw from his semifinal match against Somdev Devvarman because of a wrist injury. He also withdrew from the tournament in Sydney. At the Australian Open, he was seeded 30th but lost in the first round to Israeli Dudi Sela. He also participated in the doubles with Lu Yen-hsun, but they were defeated by Łukasz Kubot and Oliver Marach. In the first round in Rotterdam, he lost to Mario Ančić. He played the Open 13 in Marseille, defeating Laurent Recouderc in the first round.

He competed at the ARAG World Team Cup in Germany, helping his country reach the final, where they lost to Serbia.

In the second round at Wimbledon, though seeded 18th, he was upset by Dudi Sela.

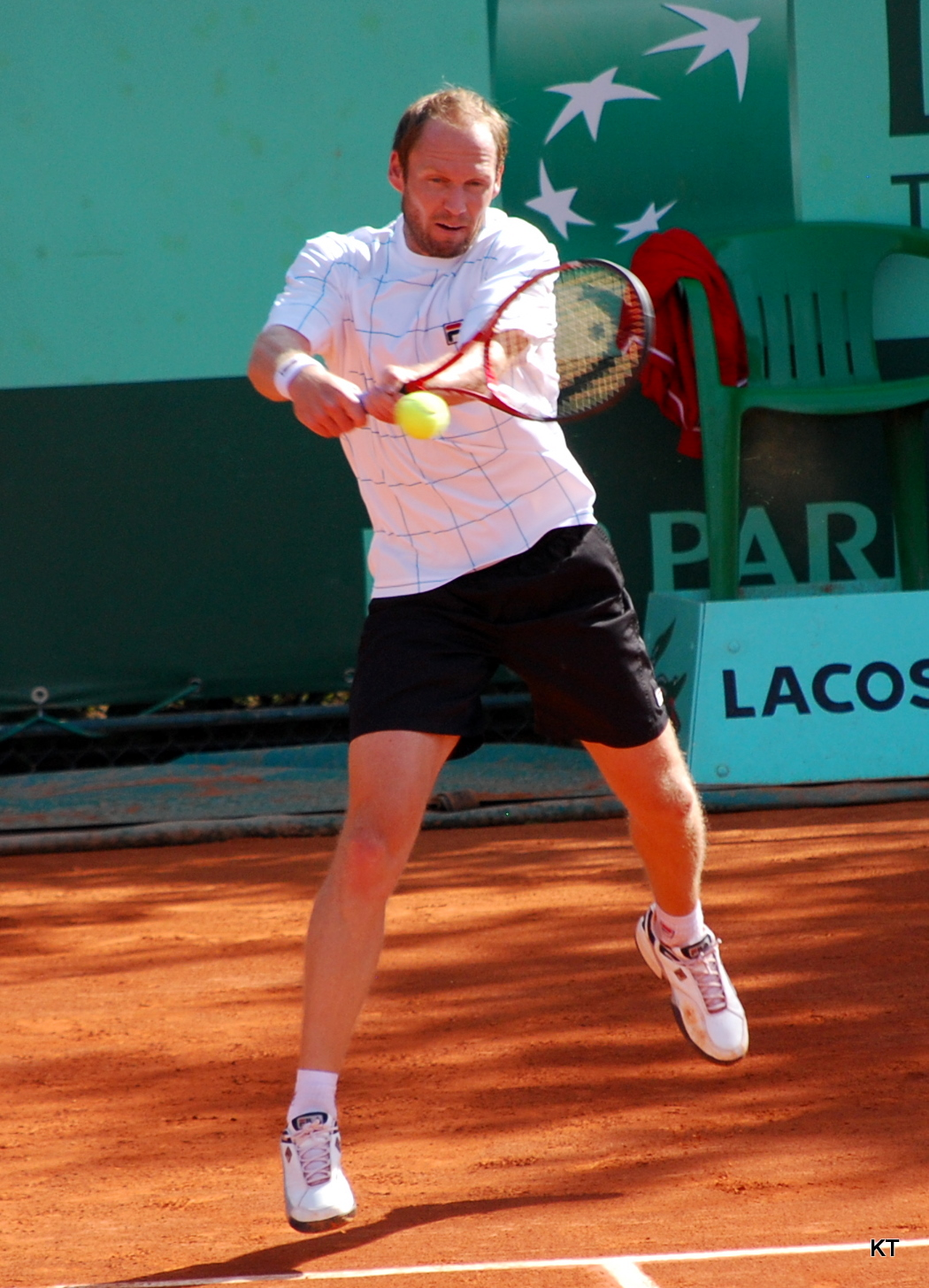
Schüttler at the 2011 French Open

=== 2010–2011 ===
He reached the second round of the Australian Open defeating Sam Querrey in four sets. However he lost to Feliciano López in four sets, too. At the French Open, he again suffered a first-round exit, this time against Guillermo García López in straight sets. He reached the semifinal of the Aegon Championships at the Queens Club in London but lost to Sam Querrey in three sets. Despite his good form he was defeated by Denis Istomin in the second round of Wimbledon in five sets. At the quarterfinal of the Countrywide Classic in Los Angeles, Schüttler could not manage to close out the match against Querrey despite serving for it at 5–4 and 6–5 in the deciding set. He was knocked out in the first round of the US Open losing to Benoît Paire. At the Thailand Open in Bangkok, Schüttler beat Ricardo Mello in round one but lost in three sets in the second round berth against Ernests Gulbis.

In 2010, Schüttler and his former Davis Cup companion Alexander Waske founded the Schüttler Waske Tennis-University, a tennis academy for professional tennis players.

Schüttler started the tour at the Qatar Open where he confronted Teymuraz Gabashvili in the singles, but lost in two sets. He also played doubles with Guillermo García López confronting Marco Chiudinelli and Jo-Wilfried Tsonga, to whom they lost in two sets. At the Australian Open, he played ninth seed Fernando Verdasco in the first round, but lost i straight sets. He then played several Challenger series tournaments. At Wimbledon, he defeated Thomaz Bellucci in the first round, but lost to Feliciano López in the second.

Schüttler officially retired in October 2012.

== Significant finals ==
=== Olympic final ===
==== Doubles: 1 (silver medal) ====
Result	Year	Tournament	Surface	Partner	Opponents	Score
Silver	2004	Athens Olympics	Hard	(Germany) Nicolas Kiefer	(Chile) Fernando González (Chile) Nicolás Massú	2–6, 6–4, 6–3, 6–7^{(7–9)}, 4–6

=== Grand Slam finals ===
==== Singles: 1 (runner-up) ====
Result	Year	Championship	Surface	Opponent	Score
Loss	2003	Australian Open	Hard	(United States) Andre Agassi	2–6, 2–6, 1–6

=== Masters Series finals ===
==== Singles: 1 (runner-up) ====
Result	Year	Tournament	Surface	Opponent	Score
Loss	2004	Monte Carlo	Clay	(Argentina) Guillermo Coria	2–6, 1–6, 3–6

== ATP Tour finals ==
=== Singles: 12 (4 titles, 8 runner-ups) ===
Legend Grand Slam Tournaments (0–1) ATP World Tour Finals (0–0) ATP Masters Series (0–1) ATP Championship Series (1–0) ATP International Series (3–6)	Finals by surface Hard (3–6) Clay (0–2) Grass (0–0) Carpet (1–0)	Finals by setting Outdoors (3–7) Indoors (1–1)

Result	W–L	Date	Tournament	Tier	Surface	Opponent	Score
Win	1–0	Jan 1999	Doha, Qatar	World Series	Hard	(United Kingdom) Tim Henman	6–4, 5–7, 6–1
Loss	1–1	Apr 1999	Chennai, India	World Series	Hard	(Zimbabwe) Byron Black	4–6, 6–1, 3–6
Loss	1–2	Jan 2000	Doha, Qatar	International Series	Hard	(France) Fabrice Santoro	6–3, 5–7, 0–3 ret.
Win	2–2	Sep 2001	Shanghai, China	International Series	Hard	(Switzerland) Michel Kratochvil	6–3, 6–4
Loss	2–3	Sep 2001	Hong Kong, Hong Kong	International Series	Hard	(Chile) Marcelo Ríos	6–7^{(3–7)}, 2–6
Loss	2–4	Oct 2001	St. Petersburg, Russia	International Series	Hard (i)	(Russia) Marat Safin	6–3, 3–6, 3–6
Loss	2–5	Apr 2002	Munich, Germany	International Series	Clay	(Morocco) Younes El Aynaoui	4–6, 4–6
Loss	2–6	Jan 2003	Melbourne, Australia	Grand Slam	Hard	(United States) Andre Agassi	2–6, 2–6, 1–6
Loss	2–7	Sep 2003	Costa do Sauipe, Brazil	International Series	Hard	(Netherlands) Sjeng Schalken	2–6, 4–6
Win	3–7	Sep 2003	Tokyo, Japan	Championship Series	Hard	(France) Sébastien Grosjean	7–6^{(7–5)}, 6–2
Win	4–7	Oct 2003	Lyon, France	International Series	Carpet (i)	(France) Arnaud Clément	7–5, 6–3
Loss	4–8	Apr 2004	Monte Carlo, Monaco	Masters Series	Clay	(Argentina) Guillermo Coria	2–6, 1–6, 3–6

=== Doubles: 8 (4 titles, 4 runner-ups) ===
Legend Grand Slam Tournaments (0–0) ATP World Tour Finals (0–0) ATP Masters Series (0–0) ATP Championship Series (1–0) ATP International Series (3–4)	Finals by surface Hard (1–2) Clay (3–1) Grass (0–1) Carpet (0–0)	Finals by setting Outdoors (4–3) Indoors (0–1)

Result	W–L	Date	Tournament	Tier	Surface	Partner	Opponents	Score
Win	1–0	Jul 2001	Stuttgart, Germany	Championship Series	Clay	(Argentina) Guillermo Cañas	(Australia) Michael Hill (United States) Jeff Tarango	4–6, 7–6^{(7–1)}, 6–4
Loss	1–1	Oct 2003	St. Petersburg, Russia	International Series	Hard (i)	(Germany) Michael Kohlmann	(Austria) Julian Knowle (Serbia and Montenegro) Nenad Zimonjić	6–7^{(1–7)}, 3–6
Win	2–1	Jan 2005	Chennai, India	International Series	Hard	(Chinese Taipei) Lu Yen-hsun	(India) Mahesh Bhupathi (Sweden) Jonas Björkman	7–5, 4–6, 7–6^{(7–4)}
Loss	2–2	Jul 2005	Gstaad, Switzerland	International Series	Clay	(Germany) Michael Kohlmann	(Czech Republic) František Čermák (Czech Republic) Leoš Friedl	6–7^{(6–8)}, 6–7^{(11–13)}
Loss	2–3	Jun 2006	Halle, Germany	International Series	Grass	(Germany) Michael Kohlmann	(France) Fabrice Santoro (Serbia and Montenegro) Nenad Zimonjić	0–6, 4–6
Loss	2–4	Feb 2007	San Jose, United States	International Series	Hard	(South Africa) Chris Haggard	(United States) Eric Butorac (United Kingdom) Jamie Murray	5–7, 6–7^{(6–8)}
Win	3–4	Apr 2008	Houston, United States	International Series	Clay	(Latvia) Ernests Gulbis	(Uruguay) Pablo Cuevas (Spain) Marcel Granollers Pujol	7–5, 7–6^{(7–3)}
Win	4–4	May 2008	Munich, Germany	International Series	Clay	(Germany) Michael Berrer	(United States) Scott Lipsky (United States) David Martin	7–5, 3–6, [10–8]

== ATP Challenger and ITF Futures finals ==
=== Singles (6–8) ===
Legend ATP Challenger (6–8) ITF Futures (0–0)	Finals by surface Hard (3–6) Carpet (3–2)

Result	W–L	Date	Tournament	Tier	Surface	Opponent	Score
Loss	0-1	Feb 1997	Lübeck, Germany	Challenger	Carpet	(United States) Geoff Grant	3–6, 3–6
Win	1-1	Oct 1997	Eckental, Germany	Challenger	Carpet	(Czech Republic) Petr Luxa	6–4, 6–1
Loss	1-2	Dec 1997	Bad Lippspringe, Germany	Challenger	Carpet	(Germany) Michael Kohlmann	6–4, 6–7, 5–7
Win	2-2	Nov 1998	Portorož, Slovenia	Challenger	Hard	(Netherlands) Peter Wessels	6–3, 6–2
Loss	2-3	Oct 2000	Bratislava, Slovakia	Challenger	Hard	(Italy) Davide Sanguinetti	5–7, 1–6
Win	3-3	Nov 2000	Aachen, Germany	Challenger	Carpet	(Sweden) Johan Settergren	7–6^{(7–5)}, 1–6, 6–1
Loss	3-4	Aug 2006	Graz, Austria	Challenger	Hard	(Germany) Florian Mayer	4–6, 7–5, 2–6
Win	4-4	Nov 2006	Aachen, Germany	Challenger	Carpet	(Russia) Evgeny Korolev	6–3, 7–5
Win	5-4	Nov 2007	Kuala Lumpur, Malaysia	Challenger	Hard	(Ukraine) Sergiy Stakhovsky	7–6^{(7–2)}, 6–2
Loss	5-5	Apr 2010	Athens, Greece	Challenger	Hard	(Chinese Taipei) Lu Yen-hsun	6–3, 6–7^{(3–7)}, 4–6
Loss	5-6	May 2010	Rhodes, Greece	Challenger	Hard	(Israel) Dudi Sela	6–7^{(3–7)}, 3–6
Loss	5-7	Mar 2011	Dallas, United States	Challenger	Hard	(United States) Alex Bogomolov Jr.	6–7^{(5–7)}, 3–6
Loss	5-8	May 2011	Cremona, Italy	Challenger	Hard	(Russia) Igor Kunitsyn	2–6, 6–7^{(2–7)}
Win	6-8	Aug 2011	Astana, Kazakhstan	Challenger	Hard	(Russia) Teymuraz Gabashvili	7–6^{(8–6)}, 4–6, 6–4

=== Doubles (2–0) ===
Legend ATP Challenger (2–0) ITF Futures (0–0)	Finals by surface Hard (1–0) Carpet (1–0)

Result	W–L	Date	Tournament	Tier	Surface	Partner	Opponents	Score
Win	1–0	Oct 1997	Eckental, Germany	Challenger	Carpet	(Germany) Lars Rehmann	(Austria) Georg Blumauer (Belarus) Max Mirnyi	6–4, 1–6, 6–3
Win	2–0	Jan 2007	Heilbronn, Germany	Challenger	Hard	(Germany) Michael Kohlmann	(Netherlands) Sander Groen (France) Michaël Llodra	walkover

== Performance timelines ==
Key
W	F	SF	QF	#R	RR	Q#	DNQ	A	NH

(W) winner; (F) finalist; (SF) semifinalist; (QF) quarterfinalist; (#R) rounds 4, 3, 2, 1; (RR) round-robin stage; (Q#) qualification round; (DNQ) did not qualify; (A) absent; (NH) not held; (SR) strike rate (events won / competed); (W–L) win–loss record.

=== Singles ===
Tournament	1995	1996	1997	1998	1999	2000	2001	2002	2003	2004	2005	2006	2007	2008	2009	2010	2011	2012	SR	W–L	Win%
Grand Slam tournaments
Australian Open	A	Q3	Q1	Q2	1R	2R	4R	3R	F	1R	2R	1R	1R	2R	1R	2R	1R	Q2	0 / 13	15–13	54%
French Open	A	A	Q1	Q2	1R	1R	1R	2R	4R	1R	1R	1R	Q3	1R	1R	1R	1R	A	0 / 12	4–12	25%
Wimbledon	A	Q1	Q1	1R	2R	3R	2R	3R	4R	3R	1R	1R	A	SF	2R	2R	2R	A	0 / 13	19–13	59%
US Open	A	A	Q2	Q2	1R	3R	2R	1R	4R	1R	2R	1R	1R	1R	1R	1R	A	A	0 / 12	7–12	37%
Win–loss	0–0	0–0	0–0	0–1	1–4	5–4	5–4	5–4	15–4	2–4	2–4	0–4	0–2	6–4	1–4	2–4	1–3	0–0	0 / 50	45–50	47%
Year-end championships
Tennis Masters Cup	did not qualify								SF	did not qualify									0 / 1	2–2	33%
Olympic Games
Summer Olympics	NH	A	not held			2R	not held			1R	not held			2R	not held			A	0 / 3	2–3	40%
ATP World Tour Masters 1000
Indian Wells	A	A	A	A	A	A	1R	QF	SF	2R	2R	2R	1R	1R	2R	2R	2R	A	0 / 11	11–11	50%
Miami	A	Q1	Q1	A	1R	1R	2R	2R	3R	2R	2R	Q1	Q1	1R	3R	1R	2R	A	0 / 11	5–11	31%
Monte Carlo	A	A	A	A	A	1R	1R	1R	2R	F	1R	A	A	A	1R	A	A	A	0 / 7	6–7	46%
Rome	A	A	A	Q2	A	A	1R	1R	QF	1R	1R	A	A	A	A	A	A	A	0 / 5	3–5	38%
Hamburg	Q1	A	Q1	Q1	3R	2R	1R	2R	3R	1R	1R	2R	1R	1R	A	A	A	A	0 / 10	7–10	41%
Madrid (Clay)	not held							held on hard							1R	A	A	A	0 / 1	0–1	0%
Canada	A	A	A	A	1R	A	A	1R	SF	1R	A	A	A	A	2R	A	A	A	0 / 5	5–5	50%
Cincinnati	A	A	A	A	3R	A	A	QF	SF	1R	A	A	A	A	Q2	A	A	A	0 / 4	9–4	69%
Stuttgart	A	Q2	A	Q1	1R	1R	1R	not held											0 / 3	0–3	0%
Madrid (Hard)	not held							1R	2R	2R	A	A	A	1R	held on clay				0 / 4	0–4	0%
Shanghai	not held														1R	A	A	A	0 / 1	2–1	67%
Paris	A	A	A	A	1R	A	A	1R	QF	1R	A	A	A	1R	A	A	A	A	0 / 5	2–5	29%
Win–loss	0–0	0–0	0–0	0–0	4–6	1–4	1–6	7–9	21–9	5–9	2–5	2–2	0–2	0–5	4–6	1–2	2–2	0–0	0 / 67	50–67	43%
Career statistics
Year-end ranking	446	332	117	109	47	45	43	33	6	42	88	97	99	33	85	84	132	855			

=== Doubles ===
Tournament	1997	1998	1999	2000	2001	2002	2003	2004	2005	2006	2007	2008	2009	2010	2011	SR	W–L	Win%
Grand Slam tournaments
Australian Open	A	A	A	A	A	1R	1R	2R	1R	1R	2R	1R	1R	2R	2R	0 / 10	4–10	29%
French Open	A	A	A	A	A	1R	A	1R	2R	1R	QF	A	A	A	2R	0 / 6	5–6	45%
Wimbledon	A	A	A	A	A	2R	A	1R	QF	2R	A	A	1R	1R	1R	0 / 7	5–7	42%
US Open	A	A	A	A	Q1	1R	2R	2R	1R	2R	2R	2R	A	A	A	0 / 7	5–7	42%
Win–loss	0–0	0–0	0–0	0–0	0–0	1–4	1–2	2–4	4–4	2–4	5–3	1–2	0–2	1–2	2–3	0 / 30	19–30	39%
Olympic Games
Summer Olympics	not held			A	not held			F-S	not held			1R	not held			0 / 2	4–2	67%
ATP World Tour Masters 1000
Indian Wells	A	A	A	A	A	A	1R	QF	1R	A	A	A	1R	A	A	0 / 4	2–4	33%
Miami	A	A	A	A	A	A	2R	1R	A	A	A	A	1R	A	A	0 / 3	1–3	25%
Monte Carlo	A	A	A	1R	Q1	A	2R	A	A	A	A	A	A	A	A	0 / 2	1–2	33%
Rome	A	A	A	A	Q1	A	A	A	A	A	A	A	A	A	A	0 / 0	0–0	–
Hamburg	Q2	2R	2R	2R	1R	1R	1R	2R	2R	2R	1R	2R	not held			0 / 11	7–11	39%
Canada	A	A	A	A	A	2R	2R	1R	A	A	A	A	A	A	A	0 / 3	2–3	40%
Cincinnati	A	A	A	A	A	1R	1R	2R	A	A	A	A	A	A	A	0 / 3	1–3	25%
Stuttgart	A	A	2R	1R	A	not held										0 / 2	1–2	33%
Madrid (Hard)	not held					A	A	2R	A	A	A	A	held on clay			0 / 1	1–1	50%
Paris	A	A	A	A	A	1R	1R	A	A	A	A	A	A	A	A	0 / 2	0–2	0%
Win–loss	0–0	1–1	2–2	1–3	0–1	1–4	3–7	5–6	1–2	1–1	0–1	1–1	0–2	0–0	0–0	0 / 31	16–31	34%
Career statistics
Year-end ranking	428	276	424	199	135	144	73	72	53	74	69	99	151	243	323			

== Top 10 wins ==
Season	1995	1996	1997	1998	1999	2000	2001	2002	2003	2004	2005	2006	2007	2008	2009	2010	2011	2012	Total
Wins	0	0	1	0	2	0	2	3	7	2	0	0	0	1	1	0	0	0	19

#	Player	Rank	Event	Surface	Rd	Score	SR
1997
1.	(Sweden) Thomas Enqvist	7	Chennai, India	Hard	1R	6–6 ret.	229
1999
2.	(United Kingdom) Tim Henman	7	Doha, Qatar	Hard	F	6–4, 5–7, 6–1	124
3.	(Spain) Carlos Moyá	2	Chennai, India	Hard	QF	6–1, 3–0 ret.	71
2001
4.	(Spain) Juan Carlos Ferrero	5	Hong Kong	Hard	QF	6–3, 7–6^{(8–6)}	44
5.	(Spain) Juan Carlos Ferrero	5	St. Petersburg, Russia	Hard (i)	1R	7–6^{(10–8)}, 6–4	46
2002
6.	(Russia) Yevgeny Kafelnikov	4	Doha, Qatar	Hard	QF	7–5, 6–4	43
7.	(Sweden) Thomas Johansson	8	Munich, Germany	Clay	1R	7–5, 6–3	29
8.	(Russia) Yevgeny Kafelnikov	5	Cincinnati, United States	Hard	1R	6–3, 6–2	26
2003
9.	(United States) Andy Roddick	10	Australian Open, Melbourne	Hard	SF	7–5, 2–6, 6–3, 6–3	36
10.	(United States) Andy Roddick	6	Indian Wells, United States	Hard	QF	6–3, 6–2	15
11.	(Czech Republic) Jiří Novák	9	Rome, Italy	Clay	3R	6–4, 7–6^{(7–2)}	13
12.	(United States) Andre Agassi	1	Montreal, Canada	Hard	QF	2–6, 6–2, 6–3	8
13.	(France) Sébastien Grosjean	10	Tokyo, Japan	Hard	F	7–6^{(7–5)}, 6–2	8
14.	(Argentina) Guillermo Coria	4	Tennis Masters Cup, Houston	Hard	RR	6–3, 4–6, 6–2	6
15.	(United States) Andy Roddick	1	Tennis Masters Cup, Houston	Hard	RR	4–6, 7–6^{(7–4)}, 7–6^{(7–3)}	6
2004
16.	(United Kingdom) Tim Henman	7	Monte Carlo, Monaco	Clay	QF	6–3, 6–1	6
17.	(Spain) Carlos Moyá	8	Monte Carlo, Monaco	Clay	SF	7–6^{(7–5)}, 6–4	6
2008
18.	(United States) James Blake	8	Wimbledon, London	Grass	2R	6–3, 6–7^{(8–10)}, 4–6, 6–4, 6–4	94
2009
19.	(France) Gilles Simon	7	World Team Cup, Düsseldorf	Clay	RR	6–4, 6–4	29

== Coaching career ==
After retirement, he began his coaching career and has coached Janko Tipsarević, Sergiy Stakhovsky and Vasek Pospisil. Since November 2018, he coached former world No. 1, Angelique Kerber. In July 2019, Kerber announced they had split on social media.

== Personal life ==
In 2014 Rainer met Serbian Jovana Sesevic, whose sister Biljana is married to another former top 10 player, Janko Tipsarević. They married in 2015 and have two sons (Noah and Leon) and now mostly reside in Switzerland.

Awards and achievements
Preceded by Paradorn Srichaphan	ATP Most Improved Player; 2003	Succeeded by Joachim Johansson
Preceded by Igor Andreev	ATP Comeback Player of the Year; 2008	Succeeded by Marco Chiudinelli
