= 2003 BNP Paribas Masters – Singles =

Singles
- 2003 BNP Paribas Masters

Final
- Champion: (United Kingdom) Tim Henman
- Runner-up: (Romania) Andrei Pavel
- Score: 6–2, 7–6^{(8–6)}, 7–6^{(7–2)}

Details
- Draw: 48 (6 Q / 3 WC)
- Seeds: 16

Events
Singles	Doubles
- BNP Paribas Masters

Tim Henman defeated Andrei Pavel in the final, 6–2, 7–6^{(8–6)}, 7–6^{(7–2)} to win the singles tennis title at the 2003 Paris Masters. It was his first and only Masters title.

Marat Safin was the reigning champion, but did not compete that year.

== Seeds ==
A champion seed is indicated in bold text while text in italics indicates the round in which that seed was eliminated. All sixteen seeds received a bye into the second round.

1. (Spain) Juan Carlos Ferrero (third round)
2. (United States) Andy Roddick (semifinals)
3. (Switzerland) Roger Federer (quarterfinals)
4. (Argentina) Guillermo Coria (third round, withdrew)
5. (Germany) Rainer Schüttler (quarterfinals)
6. (Argentina) ~~David Nalbandian~~ (withdrew)
7. (France) Sébastien Grosjean (second round)
8. (Thailand) Paradorn Srichaphan (third round)
9. (Australia) Mark Philippoussis (second round)
10. (Chile) Nicolás Massú (third round)
11. (Netherlands) Sjeng Schalken (second round)
12. (Morocco) Younes El Aynaoui (second round)
13. (Netherlands) Martin Verkerk (third round)
14. (Czech Republic) Jiří Novák (semifinals)
15. (Spain) Félix Mantilla (second round)
16. (Spain) Tommy Robredo (third round)

== Draw ==
Key

- Q = Qualifier
- WC = Wild card
- LL = Lucky loser
- Alt = Alternate
- ITF = ITF entry
- PR = Protected ranking
- SR = Special ranking
- SE = Special exempt
- JE = Junior exempt
- JR = Junior Accelerator Programme entrant
- CO = College Accelerator Programme entrant
- NG = Next Gen Accelerator Program entrant
- w/o = Walkover
- r = Retired
- d = Defaulted

=== Finals ===
Quarterfinals
14	**(Czech Republic) Jiří Novák**	**6**	**6**
Q	(Morocco) Hicham Arazi	2	1
**(Romania) Andrei Pavel**	2	**6**	**6**
5	(Germany) Rainer Schüttler	**6**	3	2
**(United Kingdom) Tim Henman**	**7^{7}**	**6**
3	(Switzerland) Roger Federer	6^{5}	1
(Sweden) Jonas Björkman	5	6^{0}
2	**(United States) Andy Roddick**	**7**	**7^{7}**

Semifinals
14	(Czech Republic) Jiří Novák	2	**6**	4
**(Romania) Andrei Pavel**	**6**	4	**6**
**(United Kingdom) Tim Henman**	**7^{7}**	**7^{9}**
2	(United States) Andy Roddick	6^{4}	6^{7}

Final
(Romania) Andrei Pavel	2	6^{6}	6^{2}
**(United Kingdom) Tim Henman**	**6**	**7^{8}**	**7^{7}**

=== Top half ===
==== Section 1 ====
First round
Q	(France) **N Mahut**	4	**6**	**7**
(Finland) J Nieminen	**6**	4	5
(Belarus) M Mirnyi	4	**6**	1
WC	(France) **F Santoro**	**6**	4	**6**
Q	(Morocco) **H Arazi**	**7**	**6**
WC	(France) P-H Mathieu	5	4
(United States) R Ginepri	6^{5}	4
Q	(Slovakia) **K Beck**	**7^{7}**	**6**

Second round
1	(Spain) **J C Ferrero**	**7^{9}**	**6**
Q	(France) N Mahut	6^{7}	4
WC	(France) F Santoro	4	**6**	0
14	(Czech Republic) **J Novák**	**6**	4	**6**
12	(Morocco) Y El Aynaoui	**6**	3	2^{r}
Q	(Morocco) **H Arazi**	4	**6**	1
Q	(Slovakia) K Beck	6^{4}	3
8	(Thailand) **P Srichaphan**	**7^{7}**	**6**

Third round
1	(Spain) J C Ferrero	5	5
14	(Czech Republic) **J Novák**	**7**	**7**
Q	(Morocco) **H Arazi**	**7^{7}**	**6**
8	(Thailand) P Srichaphan	6^{3}	3

Quarterfinals
14	(Czech Republic) **J Novák**	**6**	**6**
Q	(Morocco) H Arazi	2	1

==== Section 2 ====
First round
(Russia) M Youzhny	6^{4}	3
(Spain) **F López**	**7^{7}**	**6**
(Romania) **A Pavel**	**7^{7}**	**6**
(Slovakia) K Kučera	6^{4}	2
(Spain) **A Costa**	6^{4}	**6**	**7**
(Argentina) M Zabaleta	**7^{7}**	4	5
(Chile) F González	3	4
(United States) **J Blake**	**6**	**6**

Second round
4	(Argentina) **G Coria**	**6**	3	**6**
(Spain) F López	3	**6**	3
(Romania) **A Pavel**	**7**	**7^{8}**
15	(Spain) F Mantilla	5	6^{6}
10	(Chile) **N Massú**	3	**6**	**7**
(Spain) A Costa	**6**	1	5
(United States) J Blake	**6**	2	3
5	(Germany) **R Schüttler**	4	**6**	**6**

Third round
4	(Argentina) G Coria
(Romania) **A Pavel**	w/o
10	(Chile) N Massú	4	5
5	(Germany) **R Schüttler**	**6**	**7**

Quarterfinals
(Romania) **A Pavel**	2	**6**	**6**
5	(Germany) R Schüttler	**6**	3	2

=== Bottom half ===
==== Section 3 ====
First round
(Russia) N Davydenko	3	4
(United Kingdom) **T Henman**	**6**	**6**
(Brazil) **G Kuerten**	**6**	**7^{7}**
(United States) M Fish	4	6^{2}
LL	(Slovakia) **D Hrbatý**	**7^{7}**	**6**
(United States) V Spadea	6^{1}	1
(Argentina) J I Chela	0	3
Q	(France) **T Ascione**	**6**	**6**

Second round
7	(France) S Grosjean	**6**	4	5
(United Kingdom) **T Henman**	3	**6**	**7**
(Brazil) **G Kuerten**	6^{5}	**7^{13}**	**7^{7}**
9	(Australia) M Philippoussis	**7^{7}**	6^{11}	6^{1}
13	(Netherlands) **M Verkerk**	**7^{7}**	**6**
LL	(Slovakia) D Hrbatý	6^{3}	4
Q	(France) T Ascione	6^{5}	1
3	(Switzerland) **R Federer**	**7^{7}**	**6**

Third round
(United Kingdom) **T Henman**	**6**	**6**
(Brazil) G Kuerten	4	2
13	(Netherlands) M Verkerk	**7^{7}**	6^{12}	6^{6}
3	(Switzerland) **R Federer**	6^{3}	**7^{14}**	**7^{8}**

Quarterfinals
(United Kingdom) **T Henman**	**7^{7}**	**6**
3	(Switzerland) R Federer	6^{5}	1

==== Section 4 ====
First round
(Sweden) **J Björkman**	**6**	**7^{7}**
(Argentina) A Calleri	4	6^{5}
(Czech Republic) R Štěpánek	**6**	2	6^{3}
Q	(France) **G Carraz**	2	**6**	**7^{7}**
WC	(France) R Gasquet	**6**	6^{11}	4
(Argentina) **G Gaudio**	1	**7^{13}**	**6**
Q	(Romania) **V Hănescu**	2	**6**	**6**
(South Africa) W Ferreira	**6**	4	4

Second round
LL	(Ecuador) N Lapentti	4	1
(Sweden) **J Björkman**	**6**	**6**
Q	(France) **G Carraz**	**6**	2	**6**
11	(Netherlands) S Schalken	4	**6**	3
16	(Spain) **T Robredo**	**7**	**6**
(Argentina) G Gaudio	5	3
Q	(Romania) V Hănescu	6^{4}	6^{4}
2	(United States) **A Roddick**	**7^{7}**	**7^{7}**

Third round
(Sweden) **J Björkman**	**6**	**7^{9}**
Q	(France) G Carraz	3	6^{7}
16	(Spain) T Robredo	3	4
2	(United States) **A Roddick**	**6**	**6**

Quarterfinals
(Sweden) J Björkman	5	6^{0}
2	(United States) **A Roddick**	**7**	**7^{7}**
