= 2015 Electra Israel Open – Doubles =

Doubles
- 2015 Electra Israel Open

Final
- Champions: (Croatia) Mate Pavić (New Zealand) Michael Venus
- Runners-up: (Australia) Rameez Junaid (Canada) Adil Shamasdin
- Score: 6–1, 6–4

Events
Singles	Doubles
← 2010 ·	Electra Israel Open	· 2016 →

Mate Pavić and Michael Venus won the title, defeating Rameez Junaid and Adil Shamasdin in the final, 6–1, 6–4.

== Seeds ==
1. (United States) Nicholas Monroe / (New Zealand) Artem Sitak (first round)
2. (United Kingdom) Colin Fleming / (United Kingdom) Jonathan Marray (quarterfinals)
3. (Croatia) Mate Pavić / (New Zealand) Michael Venus (champions)
4. (Australia) Rameez Junaid / (Canada) Adil Shamasdin (final)

== Draw ==
=== Key ===
- Q = Qualifier
- WC = Wild card
- LL = Lucky loser
- Alt = Alternate
- SE = Special exempt
- PR = Protected ranking
- ITF = ITF entry
- JE = Junior exempt
- w/o = Walkover
- r = Retired
- d = Defaulted
- SR = Special ranking

First round
1	(United States) N Monroe (New Zealand) A Sitak	4	3
(Moldova) R Albot (Kazakhstan) A Nedovyesov	6	6
(Belarus) S Betov (Poland) M Przysiężny	6	6
WC	(Israel) D Cukierman (Israel) Ram Kapach	2	3
3	(Croatia) M Pavić (New Zealand) M Venus	6	6
(Slovakia) L Lacko (Ukraine) I Marchenko	1	2
(Israel) J Erlich (Netherlands) I Sijsling	7	4	[5]
Q	(Russia) K Kravchuk (Ukraine) D Molchanov	5	6	[10]
WC	(Russia) M Elgin (Israel) A Weintraub	6	7
(Germany) G Kretschmer (Germany) A Satschko	4	5
(Belarus) A Bury (Russia) A Kudryavtsev	2	7^{7}	[7]
4	(Australia) R Junaid (Canada) A Shamasdin	6	6^{3}	[10]
WC	(Israel) BT Botzer (Israel) B Patael	5	1
(Poland) M Kowalczyk (Slovakia) I Zelenay	7	6
(Croatia) M Delić (Slovenia) B Kavčič	4	2
2	(United Kingdom) C Fleming (United Kingdom) J Marray	6	6

Quarterfinals
(Moldova) R Albot (Kazakhstan) A Nedovyesov	2	2
(Belarus) S Betov (Poland) M Przysiężny	6	6
3	(Croatia) M Pavić (New Zealand) M Venus	6	6
Q	(Russia) K Kravchuk (Ukraine) D Molchanov	3	3
WC	(Russia) M Elgin (Israel) A Weintraub	2	6^{5}
4	(Australia) R Junaid (Canada) A Shamasdin	6	7^{7}
(Poland) M Kowalczyk (Slovakia) I Zelenay	6	7^{8}
2	(United Kingdom) C Fleming (United Kingdom) J Marray	2	6^{6}

Semifinals
(Belarus) S Betov (Poland) M Przysiężny	2	3
3	(Croatia) M Pavić (New Zealand) M Venus	6	6
4	(Australia) R Junaid (Canada) A Shamasdin	7^{8}	6
(Poland) M Kowalczyk (Slovakia) I Zelenay	6^{6}	3

Final
3	(Croatia) M Pavić (New Zealand) M Venus	6	6
4	(Australia) R Junaid (Canada) A Shamasdin	1	4
