= 2010 Israel Open =

- Date: May 3–8, 2010
- Edition: 3rd
- Location: Ramat HaSharon, Israel

2009 Champions

Singles
- (Chinese Taipei) Yen-hsun Lu

Doubles
- (Switzerland) George Bastl / (Australia) Chris Guccione
← 2009 ·	Israel Open	· 2015 →

The 2010 Israel Open was a professional tennis tournament played on outdoor hard courts. It was part of the 2010 ATP Challenger Tour. It took place in Ramat HaSharon, Israel between May 3 and May 8, 2010.

== Entrants ==
=== Seeds ===
Nationality	Player	Ranking*	Seeding
ISR	Dudi Sela	67	1
TPE	Lu Yen-hsun	78	2
GER	Rainer Schüttler	85	3
BRA	Thiago Alves	116	4
AUT	Stefan Koubek	117	5
ISR	Harel Levy	122	6
TUR	Marsel İlhan	123	7
GBR	Alex Bogdanovic	156	8

- Rankings are as of April 26, 2010.

=== Other entrants ===
The following players received wildcards into the singles main draw:

- (Israel) Gilad Ben Zvi
- (Israel) Noam Okun
- (Germany) Rainer Schüttler
- (Israel) Amir Weintraub

The following players received entry from the qualifying draw:

- (Bulgaria) Grigor Dimitrov
- (Israel) Tal Eros
- (Russia) Mikhail Ledovskikh
- (Finland) Juho Paukku

== Champions ==
=== Singles ===
(Republic of Ireland) Conor Niland def. (Brazil) Thiago Alves, 5–7, 7–6(5), 6–3

=== Doubles ===
(Israel) Jonathan Erlich / (Israel) Andy Ram def. (Austria) Alexander Peya / (Germany) Simon Stadler, 6–4, 6–3
