= 2009 Israel Open =

Tennis tournament

- Date: 4–10 May
- Edition: 2nd
- Location: Ramat HaSharon, Israel

Champions

Singles
- (Chinese Taipei) Lu Yen-hsun

Doubles
- (Switzerland) George Bastl / (Australia) Chris Guccione
← 2008 ·	Israel Open	· 2010 →

The 2009 Israel Open was a professional tennis tournament played on Hard courts. It was part of the Tretorn SERIE+ of the 2009 ATP Challenger Tour. It took place in Ramat HaSharon, Israel between 4 and 10 May 2009.

== Singles entrants ==
=== Seeds ===
Nationality	Player	Ranking*	Seeding
ISR	Dudi Sela	56	1
TPE	Lu Yen-hsun	62	2
USA	Bobby Reynolds	93	3
GER	Michael Berrer	111	4
BRA	Thiago Alves	120	5
GER	Benjamin Becker	126	6
FRA	Nicolas Mahut	137	7
RUS	Mikhail Elgin	138	8

- Rankings are as of 20 April 2009.

=== Other entrants ===
The following players received wildcards into the singles main draw:

- (Bulgaria) Grigor Dimitrov
- (Israel) Amir Hadad
- (Israel) Almog Mashiach
- (Israel) Noam Okun

The following players received entry from the qualifying draw:

- (Canada) Pierre-Ludovic Duclos
- (United Kingdom) Chris Eaton
- (Russia) Evgeny Kirillov
- (Germany) Sebastian Rieschick

== Champions ==
=== Men's singles ===
(Chinese Taipei) Lu Yen-hsun def. (Germany) Benjamin Becker, 6–3, 3–1, ret.

=== Men's doubles ===
(Switzerland) George Bastl / (Australia) Chris Guccione def. (Israel) Jonathan Erlich / (Israel) Andy Ram, 7–5, 7–6(6).
