= 2015 Electra Israel Open – Singles =

Singles
- 2015 Electra Israel Open

Final
- Champion: (Georgia (country)) Nikoloz Basilashvili
- Runner-up: (Slovakia) Lukáš Lacko
- Score: 4–6, 6–4, 6–3

Events
Singles	Doubles
← 2010 ·	Electra Israel Open	· 2016 →

Nikoloz Basilashvili won the title, defeating Lukáš Lacko in the final, 4–6, 6–4, 6–3.

== Seeds ==
1. (Slovenia) Blaž Kavčič (second round)
2. (Slovakia) Lukáš Lacko (final)
3. (Slovenia) Blaž Rola (quarterfinals)
4. (Turkey) Marsel İlhan (quarterfinals)
5. (Israel) Dudi Sela (first round, retired)
6. (France) Lucas Pouille (first round)
7. (Kazakhstan) Aleksandr Nedovyesov (first round)
8. (Russia) Alexander Kudryavtsev (first round)

== Draw ==
=== Key ===
- Q = Qualifier
- WC = Wild card
- LL = Lucky loser
- Alt = Alternate
- SE = Special exempt
- PR = Protected ranking
- ITF = ITF entry
- JE = Junior exempt
- w/o = Walkover
- r = Retired
- d = Defaulted
- SR = Special ranking

=== Finals ===
Semifinals
(Georgia (country)) Nikoloz Basilashvili	7^{7}	6
(Moldova) Radu Albot	6^{3}	4
(Germany) Michael Berrer	1	7^{7}	4
2	(Slovakia) Lukáš Lacko	6	6^{4}	6

Final
(Georgia (country)) Nikoloz Basilashvili	4	6	6
2	(Slovakia) Lukáš Lacko	6	4	3

=== Top half ===
First round
1	(Slovenia) B Kavčič	6^{2}	6	7
(Netherlands) I Sijsling	7^{7}	3	5
(Australia) J Millman	3	1
(Georgia (country)) N Basilashvili	6	6
(Poland) M Przysiężny	7	6
(Ukraine) I Marchenko	5	2
(Russia) E Donskoy	3	6	6
8	(Russia) A Kudryavtsev	6	4	2
3	(Slovenia) B Rola	6	6
WC	(Israel) BT Botzer	3	2
(Russia) K Kravchuk	6	6
Q	(Italy) M Viola	3	3
(Romania) M Copil	4	7^{8}	2
(Moldova) R Albot	6	6^{6}	6
(France) D Guez	6^{2}	6	6
6	(France) L Pouille	7^{7}	4	2

Second round
1	(Slovenia) B Kavčič	3	2
(Georgia (country)) N Basilashvili	6	6
(Poland) M Przysiężny	2	7^{7}	0
(Russia) E Donskoy	6	6^{2}	6
3	(Slovenia) B Rola	7^{8}	6
(Russia) K Kravchuk	6^{6}	2
(Moldova) R Albot	6	6
(France) D Guez	2	2

Quarterfinals
(Georgia (country)) N Basilashvili	6	2	6
(Russia) E Donskoy	3	6	4
3	(Slovenia) B Rola	6^{3}	1
(Moldova) R Albot	7^{7}	6

Semifinals
(Georgia (country)) N Basilashvili	7^{7}	6
(Moldova) R Albot	6^{3}	4

=== Bottom half ===
First round
5	(Israel) D Sela	7^{7}	r
WC	(Israel) A Weintraub	6^{5}
Q	(Spain) I Cervantes	7^{7}	6^{2}	1
(Germany) M Berrer	6^{4}	7^{7}	6
(United Kingdom) L Broady	6	6
(Croatia) M Delić	2	3
Q	(Italy) A Arnaboldi	6	6^{6}	3
4	(Turkey) M İlhan	2	7^{8}	6
7	(Kazakhstan) A Nedovyesov	6^{4}	6	4
WC	(Serbia) L Djere	7^{7}	3	6
(Belgium) N Desein	6	2	4
(Ukraine) D Molchanov	1	6	6
(Romania) A Ungur	3	4
WC	(Israel) Tal Goldengoren	6	6
Q	(Russia) K Khachanov	2	6	3
2	(Slovakia) L Lacko	6	3	6

Second round
WC	(Israel) A Weintraub	4	5
(Germany) M Berrer	6	7
(United Kingdom) L Broady	3	4
4	(Turkey) M İlhan	6	6
WC	(Serbia) L Djere	6	6
(Ukraine) D Molchanov	3	3
WC	(Israel) T Goldengoren	1	2
2	(Slovakia) L Lacko	6	6

Quarterfinals
(Germany) M Berrer	4	6	6
4	(Turkey) M İlhan	6	4	4
WC	(Serbia) L Djere	4	3
2	(Slovakia) L Lacko	6	6

Semifinals
(Germany) M Berrer	1	7^{7}	4
2	(Slovakia) L Lacko	6	6^{4}	6
