= 2010 Israel Open – Doubles =

Doubles
- 2010 Israel Open

Final
- Champions: (Israel) Jonathan Erlich (Israel) Andy Ram
- Runners-up: (Austria) Alexander Peya (Germany) Simon Stadler
- Score: 6–4, 6–3

Events
Singles	Doubles
← 2009 ·	Israel Open	· 2011 →

George Bastl and Chris Guccione were the defending champions. Guccione chose not compete this year and Bastl chose to compete in Sanremo instead.
Jonathan Erlich and Andy Ram won in the final 6–4, 6–3 against Alexander Peya and Simon Stadler.

== Seeds ==
1. (Israel) Jonathan Erlich / (Israel) Andy Ram (champions)
2. (India) Prakash Amritraj / (Israel) Harel Levy (quarterfinals)
3. (Russia) Evgeny Kirillov / (Russia) Alexandre Kudryavtsev (first round)
4. (Austria) Alexander Peya / (Germany) Simon Stadler (finals)

== Draw ==
=== Key ===
- Q = Qualifier
- WC = Wild card
- LL = Lucky loser
- Alt = Alternate
- SE = Special exempt
- PR = Protected ranking
- ITF = ITF entry
- JE = Junior exempt
- w/o = Walkover
- r = Retired
- d = Defaulted
- SR = Special ranking

=== Draw ===
First round
1	(Israel) J Erlich (Israel) A Ram	6	6
(Israel) G Berman (Israel) T Eros	3	2
WC	(Israel) L Dahan (Israel) E Levi	3	3
(Australia) S Groth (New Zealand) D King-Turner	6	6
3	(Russia) E Kirillov (Russia) A Kudryavtsev	3	6^{3}
(Belgium) R Bemelmans (Russia) K Kravchuk	6	7
(United Kingdom) A Bogdanovic (Bulgaria) G Dimitrov	6	6
WC	(Israel) N Behr (Israel) A Weintraub	1	4
(Israel) G Ben Zvi (Israel) A Mashiach	3	2
(Australia) N Lindahl (Australia) M Matosevic	6	6
(Brazil) T Alves (Netherlands) M Middelkoop	1	1
4	(Austria) A Peya (Germany) S Stadler	6	6
(Israel) A Hadad (Austria) S Koubek	6	6
WC	(Israel) D Alexandrov (Israel) D Belfer	2	3
(Israel) D Sela (Israel) S Steele	3	2
2	(India) P Amritraj (Israel) H Levy	6	6

Quarterfinals
1	(Israel) J Erlich (Israel) A Ram	6	6
(Australia) S Groth (New Zealand) D King-Turner	3	2
(Belgium) R Bemelmans (Russia) K Kravchuk	6	6
(United Kingdom) A Bogdanovic (Bulgaria) G Dimitrov	4	3
(Australia) N Lindahl (Australia) M Matosevic	0	1
4	(Austria) A Peya (Germany) S Stadler	6	6
(Israel) A Hadad (Austria) S Koubek	6	6
2	(India) P Amritraj (Israel) H Levy	3	2

Semifinals
1	(Israel) J Erlich (Israel) A Ram	7	6
(Belgium) R Bemelmans (Russia) K Kravchuk	6^{6}	2
4	(Austria) A Peya (Germany) S Stadler	7	6^{2}	[11]
(Israel) A Hadad (Austria) S Koubek	6^{6}	7	[9]

Finals
1	(Israel) J Erlich (Israel) A Ram	6	6
4	(Austria) A Peya (Germany) S Stadler	4	3
