= 2016 Israel Open =

- Date: 28 March – 3 April
- Edition: 5th
- Draw: 32S / 16D
- Prize money: $125,000
- Surface: Hard
- Location: Ra'anana, Israel

Champions

Singles
- (Russia) Evgeny Donskoy

Doubles
- (Russia) Konstantin Kravchuk / (Ukraine) Denys Molchanov
← 2015 ·	Israel Open	· 2017 →

The 2016 Israel Open was a professional tennis tournament played on hard courts. It was the 5th edition of the tournament, which was part of the 2016 ATP Challenger Tour. It took place in Ra'anana, Israel between 28 March and 3 April.

== Singles main-draw entrants ==
=== Seeds ===
Country	Player	Rank^{1}	Seed
RUS	Evgeny Donskoy	82	1
ISR	Dudi Sela	84	2
LTU	Ričardas Berankis	86	3
SVK	Lukáš Lacko	98	4
ITA	Thomas Fabbiano	110	5
RUS	Konstantin Kravchuk	131	6
TUR	Marsel İlhan	137	7
SUI	Marco Chiudinelli	139	8

- ^{1} Rankings are as of March 21, 2016

=== Other entrants ===
The following players received wildcards into the singles main draw:

- (Israel) Dekel Bar
- (Israel) Daniel Cukierman
- (Israel) Tal Goldengoren
- (Israel) Edan Leshem

The following players received entry as alternates:

- (Spain) Gerard Granollers
- (Ukraine) Denys Molchanov

The following players received entry from the qualifying draw:

- (Austria) Lucas Miedler
- (France) Alexis Musialek
- (Denmark) Frederik Nielsen
- (Italy) Gianluigi Quinzi

== Champions ==
=== Singles ===
- (Russia) Evgeny Donskoy def. (Lithuania) Ričardas Berankis, 6–4, 6–4

=== Doubles ===
- (Russia) Konstantin Kravchuk / (Ukraine) Denys Molchanov def. (Israel) Jonathan Erlich / (Austria) Philipp Oswald, 4–6, 7–6^{(7–1)}, [10–4]
