= 2016 Israel Open – Doubles =

Doubles
- 2016 Israel Open

Final
- Champions: (Russia) Konstantin Kravchuk (Ukraine) Denys Molchanov
- Runners-up: (Israel) Jonathan Erlich (Austria) Philipp Oswald
- Score: 4–6, 7–6^{(7–1)}, [10–4]

Events
Singles	Doubles
← 2015 ·	Israel Open	· 2017 →

Mate Pavić and Michael Venus were the defending champions, but decided not to defend their title.

Konstantin Kravchuk and Denys Molchanov won the title after defeating Jonathan Erlich and Philipp Oswald 4–6, 7–6^{(7–1)}, [10–4] in the final.

== Seeds ==
1. (Netherlands) Wesley Koolhof / (Netherlands) Matwé Middelkoop (first round)
2. (Israel) Jonathan Erlich / (Austria) Philipp Oswald (final)
3. (Belarus) Aliaksandr Bury / (Canada) Adil Shamasdin (semifinals)
4. (Sweden) Johan Brunström / (Denmark) Frederik Nielsen (semifinals)

== Draw ==
=== Key ===
- Q = Qualifier
- WC = Wild card
- LL = Lucky loser
- Alt = Alternate
- SE = Special exempt
- PR = Protected ranking
- ITF = ITF entry
- JE = Junior exempt
- w/o = Walkover
- r = Retired
- d = Defaulted
- SR = Special ranking

First round
1	(Netherlands) W Koolhof (Netherlands) M Middelkoop	3	2
(Russia) K Kravchuk (Ukraine) D Molchanov	6	6
(Spain) G Granollers (Israel) A Weintraub	7^{7}	6
WC	(Israel) D Cukierman (Israel) E Leshem	6^{3}	4
4	(Sweden) J Brunström (Denmark) F Nielsen	7^{8}	2	[10]
Alt	(United States) P Kobelt (Slovenia) B Rola	6^{6}	6	[7]
(Croatia) N Mektić (Croatia) A Šančić	3	5
(Chinese Taipei) T Chen (Austria) L Miedler	6	7
(Italy) A Arnaboldi (Italy) F Cipolla	2	4
(Switzerland) M Chiudinelli (Slovakia) L Lacko	6	6
WC	(Israel) Dekel Bar (Israel) Yankel Zemel	3	2
3	(Belarus) A Bury (Canada) A Shamasdin	6	6
(Russia) D Medvedev (Czech Republic) J Mertl	6	4	[10]
WC	(Israel) Yannai Barkai (Israel) Alon Elia	1	6	[7]
(Moldova) R Albot (Lithuania) R Berankis	6^{2}	4
2	(Israel) J Erlich (Austria) P Oswald	7^{7}	6

Quarterfinals
(Russia) K Kravchuk (Ukraine) D Molchanov	6	6
(Spain) G Granollers (Israel) A Weintraub	0	2
4	(Sweden) J Brunström (Denmark) F Nielsen	4	7^{7}	[10]
(Chinese Taipei) T Chen (Austria) L Miedler	6	6^{3}	[7]
(Switzerland) M Chiudinelli (Slovakia) L Lacko	3	4
3	(Belarus) A Bury (Canada) A Shamasdin	6	6
(Russia) D Medvedev (Czech Republic) J Mertl	4	5
2	(Israel) J Erlich (Austria) P Oswald	6	7

Semifinals
(Russia) K Kravchuk (Ukraine) D Molchanov	6	6^{5}	[10]
4	(Sweden) J Brunström (Denmark) F Nielsen	3	7^{7}	[7]
3	(Belarus) A Bury (Canada) A Shamasdin	6^{2}	4
2	(Israel) J Erlich (Austria) P Oswald	7^{7}	6

Final
(Russia) K Kravchuk (Ukraine) D Molchanov	4	7^{7}	[10]
2	(Israel) J Erlich (Austria) P Oswald	6	6^{1}	[4]
