= 2010 Israel Open – Singles =

Singles
- 2010 Israel Open

Final
- Champion: (Republic of Ireland) Conor Niland
- Runner-up: (Brazil) Thiago Alves
- Score: 5–7, 7–6(5), 6–3

Events
Singles	Doubles
← 2009 ·	Israel Open	· 2011 →

Lu Yen-hsun was the defending champion, but lost in the second round against Denis Gremelmayr.
Conor Niland won in the final 5–7, 7–6(5), 6–3, against Thiago Alves.

== Seeds ==
1. (Israel) Dudi Sela (quarterfinals)
2. (Chinese Taipei) Lu Yen-hsun (second round)
3. (Germany) Rainer Schüttler (second round)
4. (Brazil) Thiago Alves (final)
5. (Austria) Stefan Koubek (quarterfinals)
6. (Israel) Harel Levy (quarterfinals)
7. (Turkey) Marsel İlhan (semifinals)
8. (United Kingdom) Alex Bogdanovic (first round)

== Draw ==
=== Key ===
- Q = Qualifier
- WC = Wild card
- LL = Lucky loser
- Alt = Alternate
- SE = Special exempt
- PR = Protected ranking
- ITF = ITF entry
- JE = Junior exempt
- w/o = Walkover
- r = Retired
- d = Defaulted
- SR = Special ranking

=== Finals ===
Semifinals
7	(Turkey) Marsel İlhan	5	4
4	(Brazil) Thiago Alves	7	6
(Republic of Ireland) Conor Niland	7	6
(Germany) Denis Gremelmayr	5	1

Final
4	(Brazil) Thiago Alves	7	6^{5}	3
(Republic of Ireland) Conor Niland	5	7	6

=== Top half ===
First round
1	(Israel) D Sela	6	7
Q	(Bulgaria) G Dimitrov	4	6^{4}
(India) P Amritraj	3	1
(Australia) N Lindahl	6	6
(Netherlands) M Middelkoop	4	7	3
(Belgium) R Bemelmans	6	5	6
Q	(Israel) T Eros	4	5
7	(Turkey) M İlhan	6	7
4	(Brazil) T Alves	6	6
WC	(Israel) A Weintraub	3	4
(Luxembourg) G Müller	3	2	r
(Russia) K Kravchuk	6	4
(Austria) A Peya	2	6	6
(Australia) M Matosevic	6	4	2
(Lithuania) R Berankis	6	1	7
8	(United Kingdom) A Bogdanovic	4	6	6^{6}

Second round
1	(Israel) D Sela	7	6
(Australia) N Lindahl	5	3
(Belgium) R Bemelmans	5	4
7	(Turkey) M İlhan	7	6
4	(Brazil) T Alves	6	7
(Russia) K Kravchuk	4	5
(Austria) A Peya	4	7	2
(Lithuania) R Berankis	6	5	6

Quarterfinals
1	(Israel) D Sela	3	2
7	(Turkey) M İlhan	6	6
4	(Brazil) T Alves	6	6
(Lithuania) R Berankis	3	4

Semifinals
7	(Turkey) M İlhan	5	4
4	(Brazil) T Alves	7	6

=== Bottom half ===
First round
6	(Israel) H Levy	6	6
Q	(Finland) J Paukku	2	1
(Russia) A Kudryavtsev	6	6^{7}	5
(United States) A Bogomolov Jr.	0	7	7
(Republic of Ireland) C Niland	6	4	6
WC	(Israel) N Okun	4	6	3
(Germany) S Stadler	3	2
3/WC	(Germany) R Schüttler	6	6
5	(Austria) S Koubek	6	7
(Russia) E Kirillov	0	5
(New Zealand) D King-Turner	6	6
WC	(Israel) G Ben Zvi	3	2
Q	(Russia) M Ledovskikh	0	3
(Germany) D Gremelmayr	6	6
(Australia) S Groth	6	5	3
2	(Chinese Taipei) Y-h Lu	4	7	6

Second round
6	(Israel) H Levy	6	3	6
(United States) A Bogomolov Jr.	4	6	4
(Republic of Ireland) C Niland	7	4	6
3/WC	(Germany) R Schüttler	5	6	4
5	(Austria) S Koubek	6	6
(New Zealand) D King-Turner	3	4
(Germany) D Gremelmayr	7	4	6
2	(Chinese Taipei) Y-h Lu	5	6	1

Quarterfinals
6	(Israel) H Levy	6	4	2
(Republic of Ireland) C Niland	2	6	6
5	(Austria) S Koubek	3	5
(Germany) D Gremelmayr	6	7

Semifinals
(Republic of Ireland) C Niland	7	6
(Germany) D Gremelmayr	5	1
