= 2009 Israel Open – Singles =

Singles
- 2009 Israel Open

Final
- Champion: (Chinese Taipei) Lu Yen-hsun
- Runner-up: (Germany) Benjamin Becker
- Score: 6–3, 3–1, ret.

Events
Singles	Doubles
← 2008 ·	Israel Open	· 2010 →

Marsel İlhan was the defender of championship title, however he lost to Simon Stadler in the quarterfinal.
In the final Benjamin Becker retired when the result was 6–3, 3–1 and Lu Yen-hsun became the new champion.

== Seeds ==
1. (Israel) Dudi Sela (quarterfinals)
2. (Chinese Taipei) Lu Yen-hsun (champion)
3. (United States) Bobby Reynolds (first round)
4. (Germany) Michael Berrer (first round)
5. (Brazil) Thiago Alves (first round)
6. (Germany) Benjamin Becker (final, retired)
7. (France) Nicolas Mahut (first round)
8. (Russia) Michail Elgin (first round)

== Draw ==
=== Key ===
- Q = Qualifier
- WC = Wild card
- LL = Lucky loser
- Alt = Alternate
- SE = Special exempt
- PR = Protected ranking
- ITF = ITF entry
- JE = Junior exempt
- w/o = Walkover
- r = Retired
- d = Defaulted
- SR = Special ranking

=== Final four ===
Semifinals
6	(Germany) Benjamin Becker	7	7
(Australia) Marinko Matosevic	6	5
(Germany) Simon Stadler	4	2
2	(Chinese Taipei) Lu Yen-hsun	6	6

Final
6	(Germany) Benjamin Becker	3	1^{r}
2	(Chinese Taipei) Lu Yen-hsun	6	3

=== Top half ===
First round
1	(Israel) D Sela	6	6
WC	(Israel) N Okun	1	1
(Denmark) K Pless	3	4
(Australia) B Klein	6	6
(Switzerland) G Bastl	1	7	6
(Australia) C Guccione	6	6	3
WC	(Israel) A Mashiach	1	1
6	(Germany) B Becker	6	6
4	(Germany) M Berrer	4	4
(Israel) H Levy	6	6
WC	(Bulgaria) G Dimitrov	6	1
(India) P Amritraj	7	6
(Australia) M Matosevic	7	6
(United Kingdom) J Goodall	6	4
(United States) B Evans	6	6
8	(Russia) M Elgin	4	3

Second round
1	(Israel) D Sela	6	7
(Australia) B Klein	3	5
(Switzerland) G Bastl	2	0
6	(Germany) B Becker	6	6
(Israel) H Levy
(India) P Amritraj	w/o
(Australia) M Matosevic	6	6
(United States) B Evans	4	2

Quarterfinals
1	(Israel) D Sela	3	6
6	(Germany) B Becker	6	7
(Israel) H Levy	4	3
(Australia) M Matosevic	6	6

Semifinals
6	(Germany) B Becker	7	7
(Australia) M Matosevic	6	5

=== Bottom half ===
First round
5	(Brazil) T Alves	2	7	3
(Turkey) M İlhan	6	6	6
WC	(Israel) A Hadad	4	4
Q	(Russia) E Kirillov	6	6
(Germany) S Stadler	6	6
Q	(Canada) P-L Duclos	3	2
Q	(Germany) S Rieschick	7	7
3	(United States) B Reynolds	6	6
7	(France) N Mahut	5	3
(Germany) B Dorsch	7	6
(France) É Roger-Vasselin	2	5
(Russia) A Kudryavtsev	6	7
Q	(United Kingdom) C Eaton	7	6
(United States) R Ram	5	3
(United States) T Widom	3	2
2	(Chinese Taipei) Y-h Lu	6	6

Second round
(Turkey) M İlhan	7	6	6
Q	(Russia) E Kirillov	5	7	1
(Germany) S Stadler	6	6	6
Q	(Germany) S Rieschick	1	7	4
(Germany) B Dorsch	6	6	6
(Russia) A Kudryavtsev	4	7	0
Q	(United Kingdom) C Eaton	3	5
2	(Chinese Taipei) Y-h Lu	6	7

Quarterfinals
(Turkey) M İlhan	5	6	6
(Germany) S Stadler	6	3	7
(Germany) B Dorsch	2	3
2	(Chinese Taipei) Y-h Lu	6	6

Semifinals
(Germany) S Stadler	4	2
2	(Chinese Taipei) Y-h Lu	6	6
