= 2016 Israel Open – Singles =

Singles
- 2016 Israel Open

Final
- Champion: (Russia) Evgeny Donskoy
- Runner-up: (Lithuania) Ričardas Berankis
- Score: 6–4, 6–4

Events
Singles	Doubles
← 2015 ·	Israel Open	· 2017 →

Nikoloz Basilashvili was the defending champion, but chose not to defend his title.

Evgeny Donskoy won the title, defeating Ričardas Berankis 6–4, 6–4 in the final.

== Seeds ==
1. (Russia) Evgeny Donskoy (champion)
2. (Israel) Dudi Sela (semifinals)
3. (Lithuania) Ričardas Berankis (final)
4. (Slovakia) Lukáš Lacko (first round)
5. (Italy) Thomas Fabbiano (semifinals)
6. (Russia) Konstantin Kravchuk (quarterfinals)
7. (Turkey) Marsel İlhan (second round)
8. (Switzerland) Marco Chiudinelli (quarterfinals)

== Draw ==
=== Key ===
- Q = Qualifier
- WC = Wild card
- LL = Lucky loser
- Alt = Alternate
- SE = Special exempt
- PR = Protected ranking
- ITF = ITF entry
- JE = Junior exempt
- w/o = Walkover
- r = Retired
- d = Defaulted
- SR = Special ranking

=== Finals ===
Semifinals
1	(Russia) Evgeny Donskoy	6	6
5	(Italy) Thomas Fabbiano	1	4
3	(Lithuania) Ričardas Berankis	3	6	6
2	(Israel) Dudi Sela	6	3	4

Final
1	(Russia) Evgeny Donskoy	6	6
3	(Lithuania) Ričardas Berankis	4	4

=== Top half ===
First round
1	(Russia) E Donskoy	6	6
WC	(Israel) D Cukierman	1	0
(Russia) D Medvedev	6	6
Q	(Austria) L Miedler	1	2
Q	(Denmark) F Nielsen	6	2	6
(Italy) M Viola	3	6	2
(Russia) A Kudryavtsev	6	6^{4}	6^{8}
8	(Switzerland) M Chiudinelli	4	7^{7}	7^{10}
4	(Slovakia) L Lacko	4	6	3
Q	(Italy) G Quinzi	6	3	6
(Czech Republic) J Mertl	3	6	6^{5}
(Chinese Taipei) T Chen	6	3	7^{7}
(Italy) R Marcora	6	6
Q	(France) A Musialek	3	1
WC	(Israel) Dekel Bar	0	5
5	(Italy) T Fabbiano	6	7

Second round
1	(Russia) E Donskoy	6	1	6
(Russia) D Medvedev	4	6	2
Q	(Denmark) F Nielsen	3	2
8	(Switzerland) M Chiudinelli	6	6
Q	(Italy) G Quinzi	6	3	4
(Chinese Taipei) T Chen	4	6	6
(Italy) R Marcora	5	1
5	(Italy) T Fabbiano	7	6

Quarterfinals
1	(Russia) E Donskoy	4	7	6
8	(Switzerland) M Chiudinelli	6	5	2
(Chinese Taipei) T Chen	3	1
5	(Italy) T Fabbiano	6	6

Semifinals
1	(Russia) E Donskoy	6	6
5	(Italy) T Fabbiano	1	4

=== Bottom half ===
First round
6	(Russia) K Kravchuk	6	7^{7}
(Russia) I Nedelko	2	6^{2}
(Italy) A Arnaboldi	7	6
Alt	(Spain) G Granollers	5	3
Alt	(Ukraine) D Molchanov	6	7
(Serbia) M Tepavac	4	5
(Moldova) R Albot	3	3
3	(Lithuania) R Berankis	6	6
7	(Turkey) M İlhan	7^{7}	6
(France) Y Jankovits	6^{2}	3
(Israel) A Weintraub	4	6	6
WC	(Israel) E Leshem	6	2	1
(Slovenia) B Rola	6	6
(Georgia (country)) A Metreveli	1	4
WC	(Israel) Tal Goldengoren	2	2
2	(Israel) D Sela	6	6

Second round
6	(Russia) K Kravchuk	7^{14}	6
(Italy) A Arnaboldi	6^{12}	3
Alt	(Ukraine) D Molchanov	1	1^{r}
3	(Lithuania) R Berankis	6	2
7	(Turkey) M İlhan	6	6^{6}	2
(Israel) A Weintraub	4	7^{8}	6
(Slovenia) B Rola	4	4
2	(Israel) D Sela	6	6

Quarterfinals
6	(Russia) K Kravchuk	3	3
3	(Lithuania) R Berankis	6	6
(Israel) A Weintraub	0	1
2	(Israel) D Sela	6	6

Semifinals
3	(Lithuania) R Berankis	3	6	6
2	(Israel) D Sela	6	3	4
