= 2015 Electra Israel Open =

- Date: 31 March – 5 April
- Edition: 4th
- Draw: 32S / 16D
- Prize money: $125,000
- Surface: Hard
- Location: Ra'anana, Israel

Champions

Singles
- (Georgia (country)) Nikoloz Basilashvili

Doubles
- (Croatia) Mate Pavić / (New Zealand) Michael Venus
← 2010 ·	Electra Israel Open	· 2016 →

The 2015 Electra Israel Open was a professional tennis tournament played on hard courts. It was the 4th edition of the tournament, which was part of the 2015 ATP Challenger Tour. This marked the return of the tournament, which was last held in 2010. It took place in Ra'anana, Israel between 31 March and 5 April.

== Singles main-draw entrants ==
=== Seeds ===
Country	Player	Rank^{1}	Seed
SLO	Blaž Kavčič	88	1
SVK	Lukáš Lacko	99	2
SLO	Blaž Rola	101	3
TUR	Marsel İlhan	102	4
ISR	Dudi Sela	112	5
FRA	Lucas Pouille	114	6
KAZ	Aleksandr Nedovyesov	118	7
RUS	Alexander Kudryavtsev	128	8

- ^{1} Rankings are as of March 23, 2015

=== Other entrants ===
The following players received wildcards into the singles main draw:

- (Israel) Bar Tzuf Botzer
- (Israel) Amir Weintraub
- (Serbia) Laslo Đere
- (Israel) Tal Goldengoren

The following players received entry from the qualifying draw:

- (Spain) Iñigo Cervantes
- (Italy) Andrea Arnaboldi
- (Italy) Matteo Viola
- (Russia) Karen Khachanov

== Champions ==
=== Singles ===
- (Georgia (country)) Nikoloz Basilashvili def. (Slovakia) Lukáš Lacko, 4–6, 6–4, 6–3

=== Doubles ===
- (Croatia) Mate Pavić / (New Zealand) Michael Venus def. (Australia) Rameez Junaid / (Canada) Adil Shamasdin, 6–1, 6–4
