= 2009 Israel Open – Doubles =

Doubles
- 2009 Israel Open

Final
- Champions: (Switzerland) George Bastl (Australia) Chris Guccione
- Runners-up: (Israel) Jonathan Erlich (Israel) Andy Ram
- Score: 7–5, 7–6(6)

Events
| Singles | Doubles |
| ← 2008 · | Israel Open | · 2010 → |

Jonathan Erlich and Andy Ram were the defending champions; however, they lost to George Bastl and Chris Guccione in the final. The new champions won 7–5, 7–6(6).

== Seeds ==
1. (Israel) Jonathan Erlich / (Israel) Andy Ram (final)
2. (United States) Rajeev Ram / (United States) Bobby Reynolds (first round)
3. (Russia) Michail Elgin / (Russia) Alexandre Kudryavtsev (semifinals)
4. (Switzerland) Yves Allegro / (France) Nicolas Mahut (first round)

== Draw ==
=== Key ===
- Q = Qualifier
- WC = Wild card
- LL = Lucky loser
- Alt = Alternate
- SE = Special exempt
- PR = Protected ranking
- ITF = ITF entry
- JE = Junior exempt
- w/o = Walkover
- r = Retired
- d = Defaulted
- SR = Special ranking

=== Draw ===
First round
1 | (Israel) J Erlich (Israel) A Ram | 4 | 6 | [10]
(Israel) A Hadad (Germany) S Stadler | 6 | 1 | [8]
(United States) B Evans (United Kingdom) J Marray | 5 | 7 | [10]
(Germany) M Berrer (Bulgaria) G Dimitrov | 7 | 5 | [8]
4 | (Switzerland) Y Allegro (France) N Mahut | 2 | 6 | [7]
(Germany) B Becker (Germany) B Dorsch | 6 | 3 | [10]
(Brazil) T Alves (Canada) P-L Duclos | 2 | 7 | [7]
WC | (Israel) D Sela (Israel) S Steele | 6 | 5 | [10]
ALT | (Israel) G Ben Zvi (Israel) D Valtzer | 4 | 1
(United Kingdom) J Goodall (Australia) B Klein | 6 | 6
WC | (Israel) N Behr (United States) T Widom | 4 | 4
3 | (Russia) M Elgin (Russia) A Kudryavtsev | 6 | 6
(Switzerland) G Bastl (Australia) C Guccione | 6 | 6
WC | (Russia) A Sitak (Israel) A Weintraub | 4 | 3
(Israel) H Levy (Israel) N Okun | 6 | 6
2 | (United States) R Ram (United States) B Reynolds | 2 | 2

Quarterfinals
1 | (Israel) J Erlich (Israel) A Ram | 6 | 6
(United States) B Evans (United Kingdom) J Marray | 4 | 1
(Germany) B Becker (Germany) B Dorsch | 1 | 2
WC | (Israel) D Sela (Israel) S Steele | 6 | 6
(United Kingdom) J Goodall (Australia) B Klein | 4 | 4
3 | (Russia) M Elgin (Russia) A Kudryavtsev | 6 | 6
(Switzerland) G Bastl (Australia) C Guccione
(Israel) H Levy (Israel) N Okun | w/o

Semifinals
1 | (Israel) J Erlich (Israel) A Ram | 6 | 6
WC | (Israel) D Sela (Israel) S Steele | 4 | 3
3 | (Russia) M Elgin (Russia) A Kudryavtsev | 2 | 2
(Switzerland) G Bastl (Australia) C Guccione | 6 | 6

Finals
1 | (Israel) J Erlich (Israel) A Ram | 5 | 6^{6}
(Switzerland) G Bastl (Australia) C Guccione | 7 | 7
