= Andy Ram =

Israeli tennis player (born 1980)

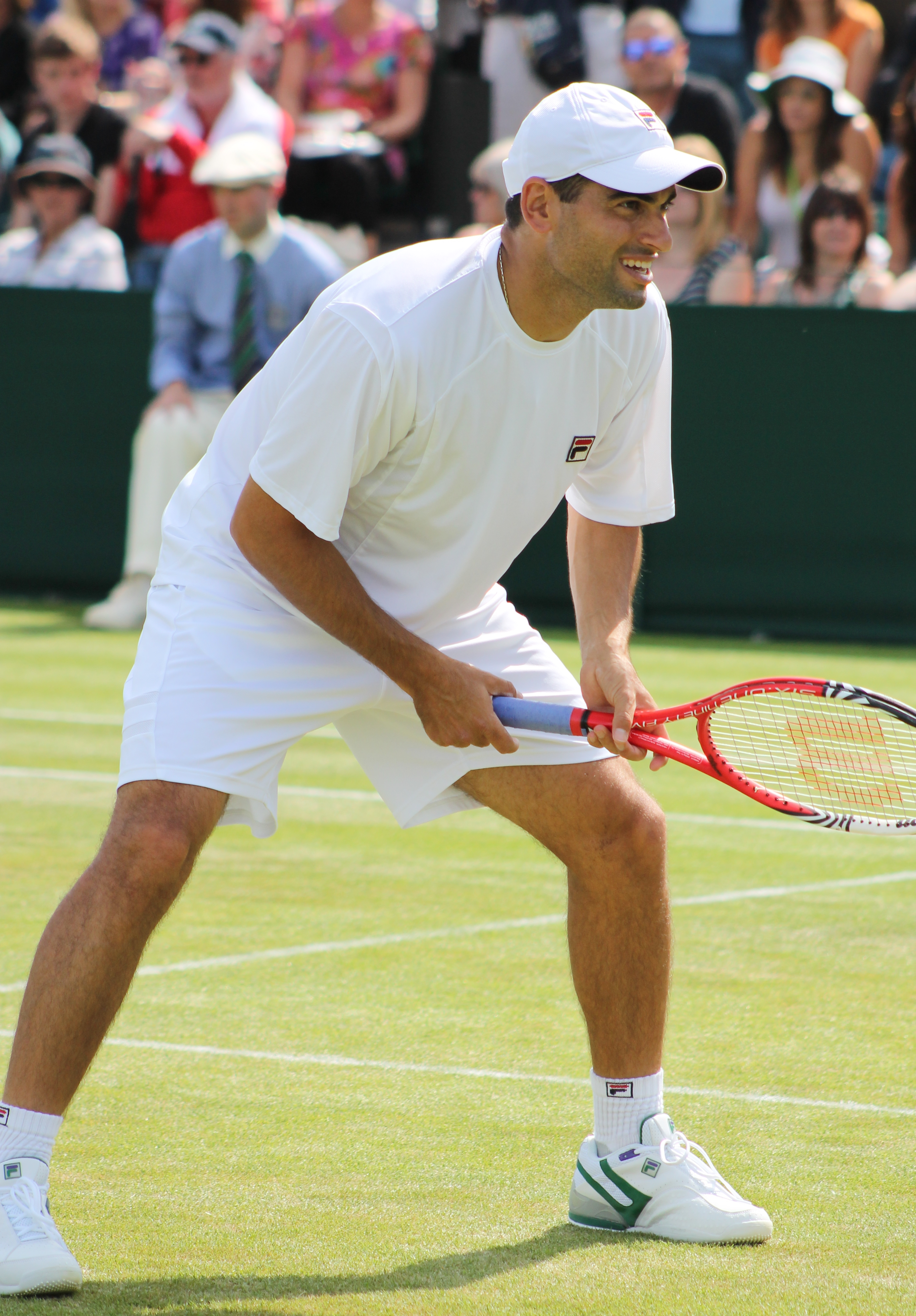
- Andy Ram in 2013.
- Full name: Andy Ram
- Native name: אנדי רם
- Country (sports): Israel
- Born: April 10, 1980 (age 46) Montevideo, Uruguay
- Height: 1.80 m (5 ft 11 in)
- Turned pro: 1998
- Retired: 2014
- Plays: Right-handed (one-handed backhand)
- Prize money: US$ 2,647,616

Singles
- Career record: 4–13
- Career titles: 0
- Highest ranking: No. 187 (14 August 2000)

Grand Slam singles results
- Australian Open: Q3 (2005)
- French Open: Q1 (2001, 2003)
- Wimbledon: 1R (2004)
- US Open: Q2 (2001)

Doubles
- Career record: 331–233
- Career titles: 19
- Highest ranking: No. 5 (7 July 2008)

Grand Slam doubles results
- Australian Open: W (2008)
- French Open: SF (2010)
- Wimbledon: SF (2003)
- US Open: SF (2009)

Other doubles tournaments
- Tour Finals: F (2009)
- Olympic Games: QF (2004, 2012)

Grand Slam mixed doubles results
- Australian Open: F (2009)
- French Open: W (2007)
- Wimbledon: W (2006)
- US Open: SF (2005)

Team competitions
- Davis Cup: SF (2009)
- Last updated on: 3 June 2021.

Andreas "Andy" Ram (Hebrew: אנדי רם; born April 10, 1980) is an Israeli retired professional tennis player. He was primarily a doubles player, and competed in three Olympics.

He is the first Israeli tennis player to win a senior Grand Slam event. Ram first won the mixed doubles title at the 2006 Wimbledon Championships, together with Vera Zvonareva. He then won the mixed doubles title at the 2007 French Open with Nathalie Dechy, and the men's doubles title at the 2008 Australian Open with Jonathan Erlich.

Ram attained his highest doubles ranking of World No. 5 in July 2008. He reached 36 doubles finals and won 20 of them through 2013, mostly with partner Jonathan Erlich; together, they are known in Israel as "AndiYoni". His Davis Cup doubles record, as of 2018, was 20–7.

In May 2014 he announced his retirement, to take effect after Israel's Davis Cup tie in September. In April 2015, Ram, CEO of Pulse Play, announced his new startup – wearable technology and an app for amateur tennis players around the world.

== Early and personal life ==
Ram was born Andreas Ram in Montevideo, Uruguay, and is Jewish. His father Amiram, a former professional football player for Beitar Jerusalem in the 1950s, was Israeli. After his father was injured he was sent to Uruguay on "shlihut" ("outreach"), and it was there that he met Ram's mother, who is Uruguayan. She is a dental specialist for children. He has an older brother and a younger sister. They moved to Jerusalem when he was five, which is when he began playing tennis. "It was tough at the beginning because I couldn't speak the language, and was fighting with people in the kindergarten who didn't understand me", said Ram. "My parents decided to send me to the tennis center not long after we arrived."

He holds a degree in Education and Society from Ono Academic College, with a specialization in sports; he also studied at the Faculty of business administration, pursuing a master's degree in the iMBA program for senior executives.

He married his wife Shiri in September 2006, and they have 3 children. The family lives in Tel Aviv. Ram is a fan of the football team Beitar Jerusalem.

== Tennis career ==
=== Early years of tennis ===
"I really enjoyed playing tennis, because when I was six or seven years old and winning tournaments it felt good", said Ram. "From when I was 8 or 10 I knew it was going to be a career for me. It's a tennis life so it wasn't so easy. You have to give up many things. When all my friends were playing outside I had to practice. I didn't go to all the school trips. But I was focused from a very young age. I grew up practicing at the Jerusalem tennis center. I spent most of my childhood there, practicing five days a week. I never regretted it and I enjoyed every moment. Now I am reaping the rewards."

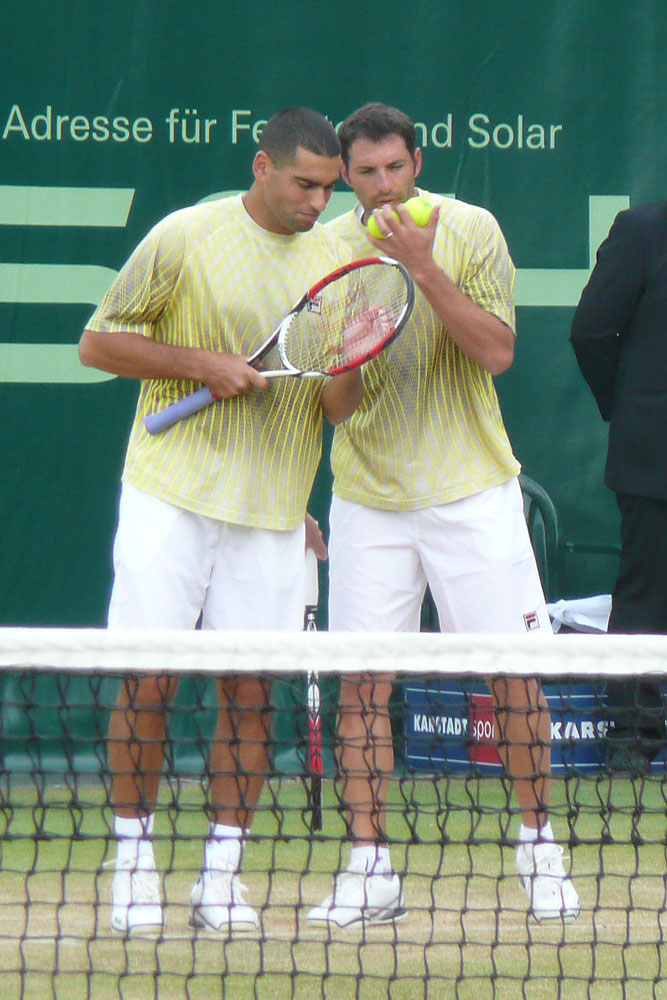
Ram/Erlich at the 2008 Gerry Weber Open

Ram was trained by Ronen Moralli at the Israel Tennis Centers in Jerusalem. When he was 15 he was sent to the Wingate Institute, where young Israeli athletes are groomed to become professionals. "It wasn't easy being far away from your family", Ram remembers, "but you know it is going to be your profession and that's what you are going to try to do for life. You practice twice a day and fit in school in between." He became a professional tennis player in 1996, at the age of 16, but did not compete in a Grand Slam tournament until 2001 when he appeared in the Wimbledon doubles with Erlich. It was at Wingate that he first met Jonathan Erlich, his future doubles partner who was also born in South America.

=== 2002 ===
In 2002 Ram was injured, and did not play because he had knee surgery and back surgery. He was on crutches for two months, could not walk, and considered giving up tennis.

=== 2003 ===
In 2003 Ram won the doubles title at the RCA Championship with Croatian Mario Ančić.

With partner Jonathan Erlich, his groundbreaking achievement was their reaching the semifinals of the Wimbledon Championships in 2003 as unknown qualifiers. They defeated three seeded opponents en route to the semifinals. In the quarterfinals, in a match in which neither side broke service, Ram and Erlich defeated No. 2 seeded Mark Knowles and Daniel Nestor in straight sets: 7–6, 7–6, 7–6. In the semis, Ram and Erlich – the first Israelis to ever advance to the semifinals in any Grand Slam event – lost to the defending Wimbledon champions, Jonas Björkman and Todd Woodbridge.

Ram reached the 2003 Wimbledon mixed doubles final with Anastassia Rodionova of Russia. The couple lost to tennis legend Martina Navratilova and Leander Paes.

Ram felt at that point that he had to choose whether to focus on doubles or singles, as he felt it would be tough to combine the two. He chose to concentrate on doubles.

Ram and Erlich then won the Thailand Open in September and the Lyon tournament in October 2003. They also won first place in Indianapolis, Istanbul, India, Rotterdam, and Milan.

=== 2004 ===
Ram competed in the mixed doubles event at the 2004 French Open with partner Petra Mandula of Hungary, and made it as far as the quarterfinals where they lost to Daniela Hantuchová and doubles ace Todd Woodbridge. Ram and Erlich were triumphant yet again in the Lyon International Series tournament in October 2004. They defeated Jonas Björkman and Radek Štěpánek in the final with a 7–6, 6–2 victory.

=== 2005 ===
In the 2005 Australian Open Ram paired up with Conchita Martínez of Spain in the mixed doubles event. Martinez and Ram pulled off an impressive coup in the quarterfinals, beating top seeds Daniel Nestor and Rennae Stubbs 7–5, 6–7, 7–6. They fell in the semifinals to Aussie pair Scott Draper and Samantha Stosur 7–5, 6–3.

Ram and Erlich won their fourth major tournament in Rotterdam in February 2005, beating Czechs Cyril Suk and Pavel Vízner for the honors. They missed the 2005 French Open grand slam tournament, as Ram's father had died as he was preparing to fly to France.

In August 2005, playing singles he defeated world # 56 Ricardo Mello of Brazil 6–1, 6–4, at the New Haven International.

Ram and Erlich played in the mixed doubles competition in Wimbledon 2005. They faced Kevin Ullyett and Liezel Huber in the quarterfinals, and were eliminated 6–4, 3–6, 8–6. They reached 8th place in the doubles race ranking at the end of 2005, and served as alternates at the Masters Cup in Shanghai.

=== 2007 ===
Ram with his mixed doubles partner at the US Open, 2007.

At the 2007 French Open, Ram, along with his partner, Nathalie Dechy, won the Mixed doubles competition. Ram and Dechy teamed up together again to compete in the 2007 Wimbledon Championships, losing in the third round to 9th-ranked Marcin Matkowski and Cara Black 6–3, 6–4.

At Cincinnati, at the ATP World Tour Masters 1000, in August he and Erlich won, upsetting the world # 1 Bryan brothers in the final 4–6, 6–3, 13–11. At the US Open, he played doubles with Erlich, losing in the round of 16 to the eventual winners Simon Aspelin and Julian Simon 5–7, 6–7. In mixed doubles with Nathalie Dechy he made it to the quarter-finals.

=== 2008 ===
At the 2008 Australian Open Ram and Erlich won the men's doubles Championship in straight sets over Arnaud Clément and Michaël Llodra 7–5, 7–6. This was the duo's first Grand Slam win after numerous ATP titles, and was also Israel's first ever Grand Slam trophy in men's doubles. The duo also won the Masters Series event at Indian Wells, California by defeating the team of Nestor and Zimonic in the finals. After Erlich's injury, Ram was playing with other partners and won indoor titles in Vienna (with Max Mirnyi) and Lyon (with Llodra).

=== 2009 ===
At the 2009 Australian Open Ram and Nathalie Dechy, unseeded at the start of the tournament, defeated two seeded pairs and reached the finals, where they lost to another unseeded pair, Sania Mirza and Mahesh Bhupathi from India, 3–6, 1–6. Later Ram won the Miami Masters tournament with Mirnyi after reaching finals in the Indian Wells Masters. Ram partnered Erlich once again at Israel Open ATP Challenger tournament in Ramat HaSharon in May, but after losing in the final he announced his decision to keep partnering with Mirnyi until the end of 2009 season (with the exception of a Davis Cup match against Russia, where he would partner with Erlich).

=== 2010–2014 ===
He partnered with Julian Knowle for the 2010 French Open. They reached the semi-finals, which was the best result for either player at the French Open.

In 2011, Ram and Erlich won both the 2011 Winston-Salem Open and the Eastbourne International tournament.

In May 2012, Ram and Erlich won the Serbia Open in Belgrade.

In May 2014, at age 34, he announced his retirement, to take effect after Israel's Davis Cup tie in September.

== Significant finals ==
=== Grand Slam finals ===
==== Doubles: 1 (1 title) ====
Result	Year	Championship	Surface	Partner	Opponents	Score
Win	2008	Australian Open	Hard	(Israel) Jonathan Erlich	(France) Arnaud Clément (France) Michaël Llodra	7–5, 7–6^{(7–4)}

==== Mixed doubles: 4 (2 titles, 2 runner-ups) ====
Result	Year	Championship	Surface	Partner	Opponents	Score
Loss	2003	Wimbledon	Grass	(Russia) Anastasia Rodionova	(United States) Martina Navratilova (India) Leander Paes	3–6, 3–6
Win	2006	Wimbledon	Grass	(Russia) Vera Zvonareva	(United States) Venus Williams (United States) Bob Bryan	6–3, 6–2
Win	2007	French Open	Clay	(France) Nathalie Dechy	(Slovenia) Katarina Srebotnik (Serbia) Nenad Zimonjić	7–5, 6–3
Loss	2009	Australian Open	Hard	(France) Nathalie Dechy	(India) Sania Mirza (India) Mahesh Bhupathi	3–6, 1–6

== ATP career finals ==
=== Doubles: 37 (19 titles, 18 runner-ups) ===
Legend Grand Slam tournaments (1–0) Tennis Masters Cup / ATP World Tour Finals (0–1) ATP Masters Series / ATP World Tour Masters 1000 (3–7) ATP International Series Gold / ATP World Tour 500 Series (2–3) ATP International Series / ATP World Tour 250 Series (13–7)	Titles by surface Hard (12–17) Clay (1–1) Grass (3–0) Carpet (3–0)	Titles by setting Outdoor (12–11) Indoor (7–7)

Result	W–L	Date	Tournament	Tier	Surface	Partner	Opponents	Score
Win	1–0	Jul 2003	Indianapolis Tennis Championships, US	International	Hard	(Croatia) Mario Ančić	(United States) Diego Ayala (United States) Robby Ginepri	2–6, 7–6^{(7–3)}, 7–5
Win	2–0	Sep 2003	Thailand Open, Thailand	International	Hard (i)	(Israel) Jonathan Erlich	(Australia) Andrew Kratzmann (Finland) Jarkko Nieminen	6–3, 7–6^{(7–4)}
Win	3–0	Oct 2003	Grand Prix de Tennis de Lyon, France	International	Carpet (i)	(Israel) Jonathan Erlich	(France) Julien Benneteau (France) Nicolas Mahut	6–1, 6–3
Loss	3–1	Jan 2004	Chennai Open, India	International	Hard	(Israel) Jonathan Erlich	(Spain) Rafael Nadal (Spain) Tommy Robredo	6–7^{(3–7)}, 6–4, 3–6
Loss	3–2	Feb 2004	Rotterdam Open, Netherlands	Intl. Gold	Hard (i)	(Israel) Jonathan Erlich	(Australia) Paul Hanley (Czech Republic) Radek Štěpánek	7–5, 6–7^{(5–7)}, 5–7
Win	4–2	Oct 2004	Grand Prix de Tennis de Lyon, France (2)	International	Carpet (i)	(Israel) Jonathan Erlich	(Sweden) Jonas Björkman (Czech Republic) Radek Štěpánek	7–6^{(7–2)}, 6–2
Win	5–2	Feb 2005	Rotterdam Open, Netherlands	Intl. Gold	Hard (i)	(Israel) Jonathan Erlich	(Czech Republic) Cyril Suk (Czech Republic) Pavel Vízner	6–4, 4–6, 6–3
Win	6–2	Jun 2005	Nottingham Open, UK	International	Grass	(Israel) Jonathan Erlich	(Sweden) Simon Aspelin (Australia) Todd Perry	4–6, 6–3, 7–5
Loss	6–3	Jul 2005	Los Angeles Open, US	International	Hard	(Israel) Jonathan Erlich	(United States) Rick Leach (United States) Brian MacPhie	3–6, 4–6
Loss	6–4	Aug 2005	Canadian Open, Canada	Masters Series	Hard	(Israel) Jonathan Erlich	(Zimbabwe) Wayne Black (Zimbabwe) Kevin Ullyett	7–6^{(7–5)}, 3–6, 0–6
Loss	6–5	Oct 2005	Thailand Open, Thailand	International	Hard (i)	(Israel) Jonathan Erlich	(Australia) Paul Hanley (India) Leander Paes	6–5^{(7–5)}, 1–6, 2–6
Loss	6–6	Oct 2005	Vienna Open, Austria	Intl. Gold	Hard (i)	(Israel) Jonathan Erlich	(The Bahamas) Mark Knowles (Canada) Daniel Nestor	3–5, 4–5^{(4–7)}
Win	7–6	Jan 2006	Adelaide International, Australia	International	Hard	(Israel) Jonathan Erlich	(Australia) Paul Hanley (Zimbabwe) Kevin Ullyett	7–6^{(7–4)}, 7–6^{(12–10)}
Loss	7–7	Feb 2006	Rotterdam Open, Netherlands	Intl. Gold	Hard (i)	(Israel) Jonathan Erlich	(Australia) Paul Hanley (Zimbabwe) Kevin Ullyett	6–7^{(4–7)}, 6–7^{(2–7)}
Loss	7–8	May 2006	Italian Open, Italy	Masters Series	Clay	(Israel) Jonathan Erlich	(The Bahamas) Mark Knowles (Canada) Daniel Nestor	4–6, 7–5, [11–13]
Win	8–8	Jun 2006	Nottingham Open, UK (2)	International	Grass	(Israel) Jonathan Erlich	(Russia) Igor Kunitsyn (Russia) Dmitry Tursunov	6–3, 6–2
Win	9–8	Aug 2006	Connecticut Open, US	International	Hard	(Israel) Jonathan Erlich	(Poland) Mariusz Fyrstenberg (Poland) Marcin Matkowski	6–3, 6–3
Win	10–8	Oct 2006	Thailand Open, Thailand (2)	International	Hard (i)	(Israel) Jonathan Erlich	(United Kingdom) Andy Murray (United Kingdom) Jamie Murray	6–2, 2–6, [10–4]
Loss	10–9	Mar 2007	Las Vegas Open, US	International	Hard	(Israel) Jonathan Erlich	(United States) Bob Bryan (United States) Mike Bryan	6–7^{(6–8)}, 2–6
Loss	10–10	Mar 2007	Indian Wells Masters, US	Masters Series	Hard	(Israel) Jonathan Erlich	(Czech Republic) Martin Damm (India) Leander Paes	4–6, 4–6
Loss	10–11	Aug 2007	Washington Open, US	International	Hard	(Israel) Jonathan Erlich	(United States) Bob Bryan (United States) Mike Bryan	6–7^{(5–7)}, 6–3, [7–10]
Win	11–11	Aug 2007	Cincinnati Masters, US	Masters Series	Hard	(Israel) Jonathan Erlich	(United States) Bob Bryan (United States) Mike Bryan	4–6, 6–3, [13–11]
Win	12–11	Jan 2008	Australian Open, Australia	Grand Slam	Hard	(Israel) Jonathan Erlich	(France) Arnaud Clément (France) Michaël Llodra	7–5, 7–6^{(7–4)}
Win	13–11	Mar 2008	Indian Wells Masters, US	Masters Series	Hard	(Israel) Jonathan Erlich	(Canada) Daniel Nestor (Serbia) Nenad Zimonjić	6–4, 6–4
Loss	13–12	Aug 2008	Cincinnati Masters, US	Masters Series	Hard	(Israel) Jonathan Erlich	(United States) Bob Bryan (United States) Mike Bryan	6–4, 6–7^{(2–7)}, [7–10]
Win	14–12	Oct 2008	Vienna Open, Austria	Intl. Gold	Hard (i)	(Belarus) Max Mirnyi	(Germany) Philipp Petzschner (Austria) Alexander Peya	6–1, 7–5
Win	15–12	Oct 2008	Grand Prix de Tennis de Lyon, France (3)	International	Carpet (i)	(France) Michaël Llodra	(Australia) Stephen Huss (United Kingdom) Ross Hutchins	6–3, 5–7, [10–8]
Loss	15–13	Feb 2009	Open 13, France	250 Series	Hard (i)	(Austria) Julian Knowle	(France) Arnaud Clément (France) Michaël Llodra	6–3, 3–6, [8–10]
Loss	15–14	Mar 2009	Indian Wells Masters, US	Masters 1000	Hard	(Belarus) Max Mirnyi	(United States) Mardy Fish (United States) Andy Roddick	6–3, 1–6, [12–14]
Win	16–14	Apr 2009	Miami Open, US	Masters 1000	Hard	(Belarus) Max Mirnyi	(Australia) Ashley Fisher (Australia) Stephen Huss	6–7^{(4–7)}, 6–2, [10–7]
Loss	16–15	Aug 2009	Canadian Open, Canada	Masters 1000	Hard	(Belarus) Max Mirnyi	(India) Mahesh Bhupathi (The Bahamas) Mark Knowles	4–6, 3–6
Loss	16–16	Nov 2009	ATP World Tour Finals, UK	Tour Finals	Hard (i)	(Belarus) Max Mirnyi	(United States) Bob Bryan (United States) Mike Bryan	6–7^{(5–7)}, 3–6
Loss	16–17	Nov 2010	Paris Masters, France	Masters 1000	Hard (i)	(The Bahamas) Mark Knowles	(India) Mahesh Bhupathi (Belarus) Max Mirnyi	5–7, 5–7
Win	17–17	Jun 2011	Eastbourne International, UK	250 Series	Grass	(Israel) Jonathan Erlich	(Bulgaria) Grigor Dimitrov (Italy) Andreas Seppi	6–3, 6–3
Win	18–17	Aug 2011	Winston-Salem Open, US	250 Series	Hard	(Israel) Jonathan Erlich	(Germany) Christopher Kas (Austria) Alexander Peya	7–6^{(7–2)}, 6–4
Loss	18–18	Jan 2012	Chennai Open, India	250 Series	Hard	(Israel) Jonathan Erlich	(India) Leander Paes (Serbia) Janko Tipsarević	4–6, 4–6
Win	19–18	May 2012	Serbia Open, Serbia	250 Series	Clay	(Israel) Jonathan Erlich	(Germany) Martin Emmrich (Sweden) Andreas Siljeström	4–6, 6–2, [10–6]

== ATP Challenger and ITF Futures finals ==
=== Singles: 7 (4–3) ===
Legend ATP Challenger (1–3) ITF Futures (3–0)	Finals by surface Hard (3–2) Clay (0–0) Grass (1–1) Carpet (0–0)

Result	W–L	Date	Tournament	Tier	Surface	Opponent	Score
Win	1–0	Jul 1999	Turkey F3, Istanbul	Futures	Hard	(Israel) Raviv Weidenfeld	6–4, 6–2
Win	2–0	Jan 2000	India F3, Madras	Futures	Hard	(Slovakia) Ladislav Švarc	6–4, 6–3
Loss	2–1	Feb 2000	Calcutta, India	Challenger	Grass	(Finland) Tuomas Ketola	3–6, 1–6
Win	3–1	Jul 2000	Bristol, United Kingdom	Challenger	Grass	(Austria) Julian Knowle	6–3, 6–3
Loss	3–2	Aug 2001	Gramado, Brazil	Challenger	Hard	(United Kingdom) Barry Cowan	6–2, 4–6, 3–6
Loss	3–3	Aug 2001	Bronx, United States	Challenger	Hard	(Germany) Björn Phau	2–6, 4–6
Win	4–3	Mar 2006	Israel F2, Ra'anana	Futures	Hard	(France) Clément Morel	6–3, 3–6, 6–3

=== Doubles: 33 (23–10) ===
Legend ATP Challenger (16–6) ITF Futures (7–4)	Finals by surface Hard (17–8) Clay (2–1) Grass (2–0) Carpet (2–1)

Result	W–L	Date	Tournament	Tier	Surface	Partner	Opponents	Score
Loss	0–1	Jul 1998	Greece F6, Veria	Futures	Hard	(Israel) Michael Kogan	(Germany) Markus Menzler (Germany) Patrick Sommer	0–6, 4–6
Loss	0–2	Jul 1999	Turkey F3, Istanbul	Futures	Hard	(Azerbaijan) Emin Ağayev	(Pakistan) Aisam Qureshi (Uzbekistan) Dmitriy Tomashevich	6–7, 4–6
Win	1–2	Sep 1999	Turkey F6, Antalya	Futures	Clay	(Israel) Amir Hadad	(Slovakia) Vladimir Platenik (Slovakia) Martin Hromec	6–4, 6–4
Loss	1–3	Oct 1999	Uzbekistan F4, Fergana	Futures	Hard	(Italy) Stefano Galvani	(Israel) Lior Dahan (Belgium) Kris Goossens	5–7, 6–7
Win	2–3	Oct 1999	Uzbekistan F5, Karshi	Futures	Hard	(Italy) Stefano Galvani	(Slovakia) Tomáš Čatár (Slovakia) Branislav Sekáč	6–4, 7–6
Win	3–3	Jan 2000	India F2, Bangalore	Futures	Clay	(Israel) Nir Welgreen	(Pakistan) Aisam Qureshi (United Kingdom) Miles Maclagan	2–6, 6–3, 6–4
Win	4–3	Jan 2000	India F3, Madras	Futures	Hard	(Israel) Nir Welgreen	(Slovakia) Boris Borgula (Slovakia) Ladislav Švarc	6–4, 5–7, 6–4
Win	5–3	Feb 2000	Calcutta, India	Challenger	Grass	(Israel) Nir Welgreen	(France) Guillaume Marx (France) Gregory Carraz	2–1 ret.
Loss	5–4	Mar 2000	France F6, Douai	Futures	Carpet	(Croatia) Lovro Zovko	(Belgium) Gilles Elseneer (Belgium) Arnaud Fontaine	1–6, 4–6
Loss	5–5	Jun 2000	Denver, United States	Challenger	Hard	(Israel) Noam Behr	(Israel) Jonathan Erlich (Israel) Lior Mor	4–6, 7–5, 2–6
Win	6–5	Jul 2000	Manchester, United Kingdom	Challenger	Grass	(Australia) Dejan Petrovic	(Switzerland) Yves Allegro (Switzerland) Ivo Heuberger	6–2, 7–6^{(7–1)}
Win	7–5	Jul 2000	Córdoba, Spain	Challenger	Hard	(Australia) Dejan Petrovic	(Spain) Óscar Burrieza López (Brazil) Daniel Melo	6–1, 6–4
Win	8–5	Jan 2001	USA F2, Delray Beach	Futures	Hard	(Israel) Noam Behr	(Croatia) Lovro Zovko (Slovenia) Andrej Kračman	6–4, 6–7^{(4–7)}, 7–6^{(7–4)}
Loss	8–6	May 2001	Prague, Czech Republic	Challenger	Clay	(Israel) Noam Behr	(Czech Republic) Michal Navrátil (Czech Republic) Jaroslav Levinský	3–6, 1–6
Win	9–6	Jul 2001	Campos do Jordão, Brazil	Challenger	Hard	(Australia) Dejan Petrovic	(Brazil) Adriano Ferreira (Brazil) Daniel Melo	6–3, 6–4
Win	10–6	Aug 2001	Belo Horizonte, Brazil	Challenger	Hard	(Australia) Dejan Petrovic	(United Kingdom) Barry Cowan (United States) Eric Taino	6–3, 6–4
Win	11–6	Aug 2001	Gramado, Brazil	Challenger	Hard	(Australia) Dejan Petrovic	(Brazil) Adriano Ferreira (Brazil) Daniel Melo	6–4, 6–4
Win	12–6	Oct 2001	Grenoble, France	Challenger	Hard	(Israel) Jonathan Erlich	(South Africa) Paul Rosner (United States) Glenn Weiner	6–4, 3–6, 7–6^{(7–4)}
Win	13–6	Nov 2001	Puebla, Mexico	Challenger	Hard	(Israel) Jonathan Erlich	(Switzerland) Marco Chiudinelli (Finland) Tuomas Ketola	6–4, 6–7^{(5–7)}, 6–1
Win	14–6	Dec 2001	Costa Rica Challenger	Challenger	Hard	(Israel) Jonathan Erlich	(Brazil) Daniel Melo (Federal Republic of Yugoslavia) Dušan Vemić	6–3, 6–3
Loss	14–7	Feb 2002	Brest, France	Challenger	Hard	(Israel) Jonathan Erlich	(Australia) Ben Ellwood (Australia) Stephen Huss	1–6, 4–6
Loss	14–8	Jan 2003	São Paulo, Brazil	Challenger	Hard	(Argentina) Ignacio Hirigoyen	(Argentina) Federico Browne (Netherlands) Rogier Wassen	6–7^{(0–7)}, 6–7^{(3–7)}
Win	15–8	Feb 2003	Great Britain F2, Nottingham	Futures	Carpet	(United Kingdom) Mark Hilton	(Israel) Jonathan Erlich (Israel) Harel Levy	7–6^{(9–7)}, 6–2
Win	16–8	Mar 2003	Kyoto, Japan	Challenger	Carpet	(Israel) Amir Hadad	(Czech Republic) Jan Hájek (Chinese Taipei) Jimmy Wang	3–6, 6–3, 6–1
Win	17–8	Apr 2003	Greece F1, Syros	Futures	Hard	(Israel) Jonathan Erlich	(Switzerland) Marco Chiudinelli (Italy) Uros Vico	6–3, 3–6, 6–3
Loss	17–9	May 2003	New Delhi, India	Challenger	Hard	(Israel) Jonathan Erlich	(Bulgaria) Radoslav Lukaev (Russia) Dmitry Vlasov	6–7^{(6–8)}, 6–4, 2–6
Win	18–9	Aug 2003	Binghamton, United States	Challenger	Hard	(Israel) Jonathan Erlich	(South Africa) Myles Wakefield (Australia) Stephen Huss	6–4, 6–3
Win	19–9	Sep 2003	Istanbul, Turkey	Challenger	Hard	(Israel) Jonathan Erlich	(Israel) Harel Levy (Israel) Amir Hadad	7–6^{(7–5)}, 7–6^{(8–6)}
Win	20–9	Jul 2008	Ramat HaSharon, Israel	Challenger	Hard	(Israel) Jonathan Erlich	(Russia) Mikhail Elgin (Ukraine) Sergey Bubka	6–3, 7–6^{(7–3)}
Loss	20–10	Mar 2009	Ramat HaSharon, Israel	Challenger	Hard	(Israel) Jonathan Erlich	(Switzerland) George Bastl (Australia) Chris Guccione	5–7, 6–7^{(6–8)}
Win	21–10	May 2010	Ramat HaSharon, Israel	Challenger	Hard	(Israel) Jonathan Erlich	(Austria) Alexander Peya (Germany) Simon Stadler	6–4, 6–3
Win	22–10	Aug 2013	Vancouver, Canada	Challenger	Hard	(Israel) Jonathan Erlich	(United States) James Cerretani (Canada) Adil Shamasdin	6–1, 6–4
Win	23–10	Aug 2013	Aptos, United States	Challenger	Hard	(Israel) Jonathan Erlich	(Australia) Matt Reid (Australia) Chris Guccione	6–3, 6–7^{(6–8)}, [10–2]

== Junior Grand Slam finals ==
=== Doubles: 2 (2 runner-ups) ===
Result	Year	Tournament	Surface	Partner	Opponents	Score
Loss	1998	Wimbledon	Grass	(France) Michaël Llodra	(Switzerland) Roger Federer (Belgium) Olivier Rochus	4–6, 4–6
Loss	1998	US Open	Hard	(Croatia) Lovro Zovko	(United States) KJ Hippensteel (United States) David Martin	7–6, 6–7, 2–6

== Performance timelines ==
Key
W	F	SF	QF	#R	RR	Q#	P#	DNQ	A	Z#	PO	G	S	B	NMS	NTI	P	NH

(W) winner; (F) finalist; (SF) semifinalist; (QF) quarterfinalist; (#R) rounds 4, 3, 2, 1; (RR) round-robin stage; (Q#) qualification round; (P#) preliminary round; (DNQ) did not qualify; (A) absent; (Z#) Davis/Fed Cup Zonal Group (with number indication) or (PO) play-off; (G) gold, (S) silver or (B) bronze Olympic/Paralympic medal; (NMS) not a Masters tournament; (NTI) not a Tier I tournament; (P) postponed; (NH) not held; (SR) strike rate (events won / competed); (W–L) win–loss record.

=== Singles ===
Tournament	2000	2001	2002	2003	2004	2005	SR	W–L	Win %
Grand Slam tournaments
Australian Open	A	A	Q1	A	A	Q3	0 / 0	0–0	–
French Open	A	Q1	A	Q1	A	A	0 / 0	0–0	–
Wimbledon	Q2	Q2	A	Q3	1R	A	0 / 1	0–1	0%
US Open	Q1	Q2	A	Q1	A	A	0 / 0	0–0	–
Win–loss	0–0	0–0	0–0	0–0	0–1	0–0	0 / 1	0–1	0%

=== Doubles ===
Tournament	2001	2002	2003	2004	2005	2006	2007	2008	2009	2010	2011	2012	2013	2014	SR	W–L	Win %
Grand Slam tournaments
Australian Open	A	1R	A	2R	3R	2R	3R	W	2R	1R	2R	1R	A	1R	1 / 11	13–10	57%
French Open	A	A	A	3R	A	2R	3R	3R	1R	SF	1R	2R	2R	A	0 / 9	13–9	59%
Wimbledon	2R	A	SF	1R	3R	3R	2R	QF	3R	3R	1R	2R	1R	A	0 / 12	17–12	59%
US Open	1R	A	1R	1R	QF	3R	3R	2R	SF	1R	2R	2R	2R	A	0 / 12	15–12	56%
Win–loss	1–2	0–1	4–2	3–4	5–3	6–4	7–4	12–3	7–4	6–4	2–4	3–4	2–3	0–1	1 / 44	58–43	57%
ATP Masters Series
Indian Wells	A	A	A	2R	2R	1R	F	W	F	QF	2R	A	A	A	1 / 8	17–7	71%
Miami	A	A	A	2R	QF	SF	1R	1R	W	1R	QF	A	A	A	1 / 8	13–7	65%
Monte Carlo	A	A	A	2R	A	2R	2R	QF	QF	1R	1R	A	A	A	0 / 7	2–7	22%
Rome	A	A	A	1R	1R	F	2R	2R	QF	1R	A	A	A	A	0 / 7	4–7	36%
Madrid (Stuttgart)	A	A	A	1R	1R	QF	1R	1R	2R	QF	1R	A	A	A	0 / 8	3–8	27%
Canada	A	A	A	QF	F	2R	SF	2R	F	2R	A	A	A	A	0 / 7	10–7	59%
Cincinnati	A	A	A	QF	1R	SF	W	F	2R	QF	A	A	A	A	1 / 7	13–6	68%
Shanghai	Not Held								2R	1R	A	A	A	A	0 / 2	1–2	33%
Paris	A	A	A	A	QF	1R	1R	QF	2R	F	1R	A	A	A	0 / 7	6–7	46%
Hamburg	A	A	A	1R	1R	QF	SF	2R	NM1						0 / 5	3–5	38%
Win–loss	0–0	0–0	0–0	6–8	8–8	10–9	11–8	10–8	15–8	8–9	3–5	0–0	0–0	0–0	3 / 66	71–63	53%
Year End Ranking	103	494	31	32	15	13	18	5	9	23	51	53	113	1429			

=== Mixed doubles ===
Tournament	2003	2004	2005	2006	2007	2008	2009	2010	2011	2012	2013	SR	W–L	Win %
Grand Slam tournaments
Australian Open	A	1R	SF	2R	1R	SF	F	QF	QF	2R	A	0 /9	16–9	64%
French Open	A	QF	A	SF	W	1R	QF	2R	1R	A	A	1 / 7	13–6	68%
Wimbledon	F	3R	3R	W	3R	QF	1R	2R	3R	3R	2R	1 / 11	19–10	66%
US Open	A	1R	SF	1R	QF	1R	A	2R	A	A	A	0 / 6	5–6	45%
Win–loss	5–1	4–4	7–3	9–3	7–3	5–4	6–3	4–4	3–3	2–2	1–1	2 / 33	53–31	63%

== Davis Cup ==
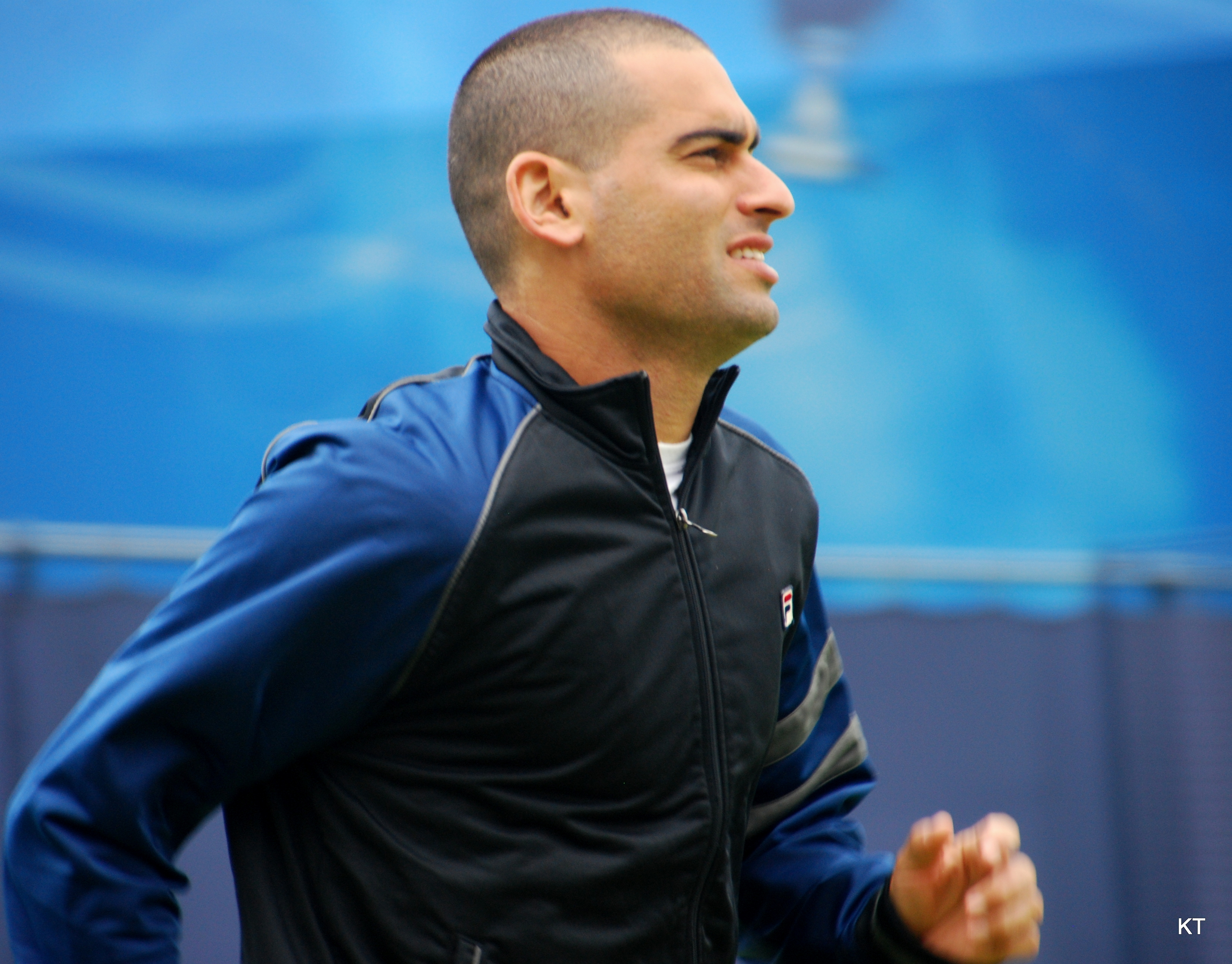
Ram in 2013

Ram played on the Israel Davis Cup team in 2001–09, going 14–8 through July 2009. In 2007 he won two matches in Israel's 5–0 win over Luxembourg, and he won his doubles matches in Israel's 3–2 wins over Italy and over Chile (in which he and Erlich defeated Olympic gold medal winners González and Massú). In 2008, Ram and Erlich won their doubles match against Simon Aspelin and Robert Lindstedt in Israel's 3–2 loss to Sweden in the World group, and then Ram partnering Harel Levy defeated the Peruvian duo Mauricio Echazú/Matias Silva on the way to Israel's 4–1 victory, granting Israel a place in the World Group for the next season. In March 2009, partnering Amir Hadad, Ram lost in Malmö to the same Swedish pair he defeated a year earlier, but the Israeli team won 3–2 overall and proceeded to the World Group quarterfinal.

Israel (ranked 8th in the Davis Cup standings, with 5,394 points) hosted heavily favored Russia (which won in both 2002 and 2006, and was the top-ranked country in Davis Cup standings, with 27,897 points) in a Davis Cup quarterfinal tie in July 2009, on indoor hard courts at the Nokia Arena in Tel Aviv. Israel was represented by Ram, Erlich, Dudi Sela, and Harel Levy. Russia's lineup consisted of Marat Safin (# 24 in the world; former world # 1), Igor Andreev (26), Igor Kunitsyn (35), and Mikhail Youzhny (44; former world # 8). The stage was set by Safin, who prior to the tie told the press: "With all due respect, Israel was lucky to get to the quarterfinals." The Israeli team's response was to beat the Russian team in each of their first three matches, thereby winning the tie. Levy, world # 210, beat Russia's top player, Andreev, world # 24, 6–4, 6–2, 4–6, 6–2 in the opening match. Sela (# 33) followed by beating Russian Youzhny 3–6, 6–1, 6–0, 7–5. Israeli captain Eyal Ran likened his players to two fighter jets on court, saying: "I felt as if I had two F-16s out there today, they played amazingly well." The 10,500 spectators were the largest crowd ever for a tennis match in Israel. The next day Ram and Erlich beat Safin and Kunitsyn 6–3, 6–4, 6–7, 4–6, 6–4 in front of a boisterous crowd of over 10,000. "I started to cry like a little boy", said Ram. Even the Saudi Gazette described the doubles match as a "thrilling" win. Captain Ran was carried shoulder-high around the Tel Aviv stadium, as the 10,000-strong crowd applauded. With the tie clinched for Israel, the reverse singles rubbers were "dead", and instead of best-of-five matches, best-of-three sets were played, with the outcomes of little to no importance. Israel wrapped up a 4–1 victory over Russia, as Levy defeated Kunitsyn 6–4, 4–6, 7–6, while Sela retired with a wrist injury while down 3–4 in the first set against Andreev. Israel next faced the Spanish Davis Cup team in Marbella, Spain on September 18–20, in Israel's first appearance in the Davis Cup semifinals. Spain won a 4–1 victory over Israel.

== Olympics ==
Erlich and Ram represented Israel at the 2004 Summer Olympics in Athens, and reached the quarterfinals. Ranked 8th overall, in the 1st round they defeated Thomas Enqvist and Robin Söderling of Sweden 7–5, 6–3, and then beat Russians Igor Andreev and Nikolay Davydenko in the 2nd round 6–4, 6–1. In the quarterfinals they were defeated by Germans Nicolas Kiefer and Rainer Schüttler in three sets, 6–2, 2–6, 2–6.

They also represented Israel at the 2008 Summer Olympics in Beijing, China, where they lost to the French team of Arnaud Clément and Michaël Llodra in the first round, and at the 2012 Summer Olympics, where they were beaten by the Bryan brothers in the quarter-final.

They then represented Israel at the 2012 Summer Olympics in London, England, where they defeated Roger Federer and Stanislas Wawrinka, before losing to the Bryan brothers, who won the gold medal.

== Award ==
Ram was awarded the inaugural Jerusalem Athlete of the Year award in 2006.

== Business venture after tennis career ==
In April 2015, Ram, co-founder and CEO of Pulse Play, announced his new startup – wearable technology and an app for amateur tennis players around the world. It is a smartwatch designed to handle intense and animated tennis, table tennis, badminton, and squash. It operates in real time and connects to the cloud, so users can find nearby opponents, see how they rank against other players worldwide, and track their improvement. Ram raised money initially in crowd-funding on Indiegogo.

== See also ==
- List of select Jewish tennis players
