= Bar Tzuf Botzer =

Israeli tennis player

Bar Botzer בר בוצר
- Full name: Bar Tzuf Botzer
- Native name: בר צוף בוצר
- Country (sports): Israel
- Residence: Tel Aviv, Israel
- Born: 2 March 1994 (age 31) Tel Aviv, Israel
- Height: 6 ft 0 in (1.83 m)
- Plays: Right-handed
- Prize money: $12,150

Singles
- Career record: 0–2
- Career titles: 0
- Highest ranking: No. 583 (17 February 2014)
- Current ranking: No. 893 (2 March 2015)

Grand Slam singles results
- Australian Open Junior: 1R (2012)
- French Open Junior: 1R (2012)
- Wimbledon Junior: Q2 (2012)
- US Open Junior: 1R (2011)

Doubles
- Career record: 0–0
- Career titles: 0
- Highest ranking: No. 1,462 (16 September 2013)

Grand Slam doubles results
- Australian Open Junior: 1R (2012)
- French Open Junior: 2R (2012)
- Wimbledon Junior: 2R (2012)
- US Open Junior: 1R (2011)

Team competitions
- Davis Cup: 0–4 in singles; 0–1 in doubles
- Last updated on: 2 March 2015.

Bar Tzuf Botzer (Hebrew: בר צוף בוצר; born 2 March 1994) is an Israeli tennis player. He began playing for the Israel Davis Cup team at the age of 20, in 2014.

His career-high ranking in singles is World # 583, which he achieved on 17 February 2014.

== Biography ==
Botzer was born in and resides in Tel Aviv, Israel. He started playing tennis at age five.

Botzer played for the Israel Davis Cup team against Argentina in September 2014, at age 20 as a substitute for Amir Weintraub. He lost singles matches to world # 25 Leonardo Mayer and world # 67 Carlos Berlocq.

Botzer played for the team against the Romania Davis Cup team in 2015, losing in singles to world # 159 Adrian Ungur and to world # 168 Marius Copil. In doubles, he and 17-year-old Edan Leshem lost to Florin Mergea (world doubles # 17) and Horia Tecau (world doubles # 9).
