= Jonathan Erlich =

Israeli tennis player (born 1977)

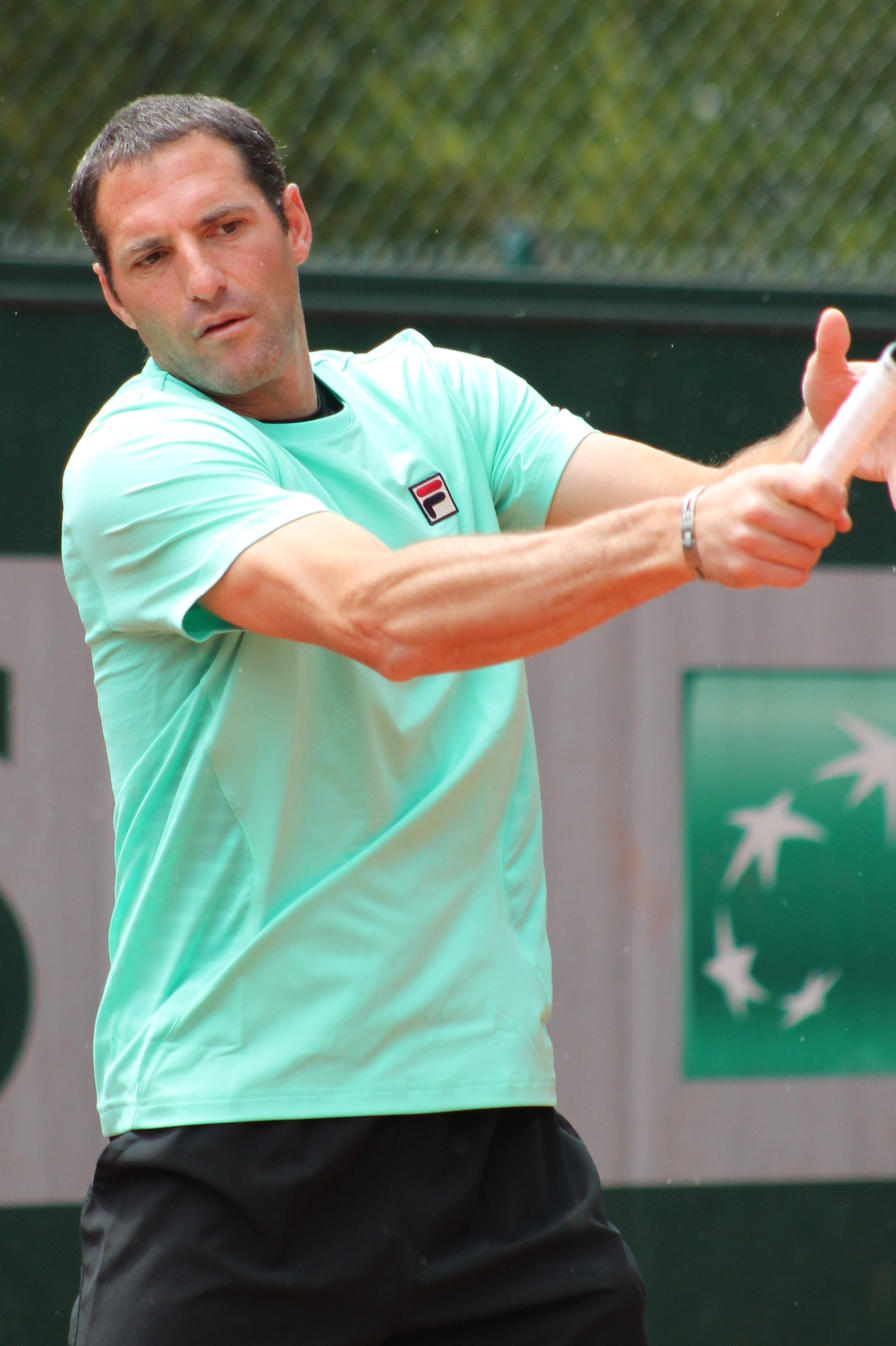
- Native name: יונתן ארליך
- Country (sports): Israel
- Residence: Tel Aviv, Israel
- Born: 5 April 1977 (age 49) Buenos Aires, Argentina
- Height: 1.75 m (5 ft 9 in)
- Turned pro: 1996
- Retired: September 2022
- Plays: Right-handed (one-handed backhand)
- Prize money: $2,810,794

Singles
- Career record: 6–6
- Career titles: 0
- Highest ranking: No. 292 (4 October 1999)

Grand Slam singles results
- Wimbledon: Q2 (1999)

Doubles
- Career record: 413-346
- Career titles: 22
- Highest ranking: No. 5 (7 July 2008)

Grand Slam doubles results
- Australian Open: W (2008)
- French Open: 3R (2004, 2007, 2008, 2014)
- Wimbledon: SF (2003, 2015)
- US Open: QF (2005)

Other doubles tournaments
- Tour Finals: RR (2006, 2007)
- Olympic Games: QF (2004, 2012)

Grand Slam mixed doubles results
- Australian Open: SF (2004)
- French Open: 1R (2004, 2005, 2006, 2007, 2008 )
- Wimbledon: QF (2011)
- US Open: 2R (2007)

Team competitions
- Davis Cup: SF (2009)
- Last updated on: 25 April 2022.

Jonathan Dario "Yoni" Erlich (Hebrew: יונתן דאריו "יוני" ארליך; born 5 April 1977) is an Israeli former professional tennis player. During his career, he was mainly a doubles specialist, having won the men's doubles title at the 2008 Australian Open with Andy Ram. He attained his career-high doubles ranking of world No. 5 in July 2008. Erlich has reached 44 doubles finals and won 22 (half of them), mostly with partner Andy Ram; together, they are known in Israel as "Andyoni". His Davis Cup doubles record, as of 2018, was 22–12.

== Personal information ==
Jonathan Erlich, who is Jewish, was born in Buenos Aires, Argentina. He moved to Haifa, Israel, when he was a one-year-old, and now resides in Tel Aviv and competed as an Israeli.

Erlich first started playing tennis when he was three years old, and he played his first tournament at the age of seven. He was later trained at the Wingate Institute, where he met Andy Ram, his future doubles partner. He turned pro in 1996 at the age of 19.

Erlich is known as a fan of the football team Maccabi Haifa.

Following his retirement, in 2023 Erlich joined the non-profit Israel Tennis & Education Centers (ITEC) as Director of High-Performance Program. In his new position, responsible for the development of competitive tennis layers from all backgrounds throughout Israel, with an emphasis on distributing resources and identifying talent in under-served and remote areas of the country.

== Tennis career ==
=== 1996–2005 ===
Erlich and Ram first competed at Queen's Club in June 2001. In 2002, in singles Erlich defeated world # 64 ranked Adrian Voinea of Romania, 6–2, 6–3, in Indianapolis.

The Israeli duo's best achievement was reaching the semifinal of the Wimbledon championships in 2003. They defeated Mark Knowles and Daniel Nestor but lost the semifinal to defending Wimbledon champions Jonas Björkman and Todd Woodbridge. They were the first Israelis to advance to the semifinals in a Grand Slam event.

They won the Thailand Open in September 2003 and the Grand Prix de Lyon in October 2003, defeating Julien Benneteau and Nicolas Mahut 6–1, 6–3 in the final.

Erlich advanced with Liezel Huber of South Africa to the semifinals in the mixed doubles tournament in 2004 at the Australian Open. They were defeated by Leander Paes and Martina Navratilova in the semifinals.

Ram and Erlich won the Lyon tournament again in October 2004. They defeated Jonas Björkman and Radek Štěpánek 7–6, 6–2 in the final. Erlich and Ram's next major tournament win was in Rotterdam in February 2005. They beat Czechs Cyril Suk and Pavel Vízner 6–4, 4–6, 6–3 in the finals. Ram and Erlich missed the French Open in 2005 due to the death of Ram's father shortly before the tournament was due to start. They reached 8th place in the doubles ranking at the end of 2005, and served as alternates at the Masters Cup in Shanghai.

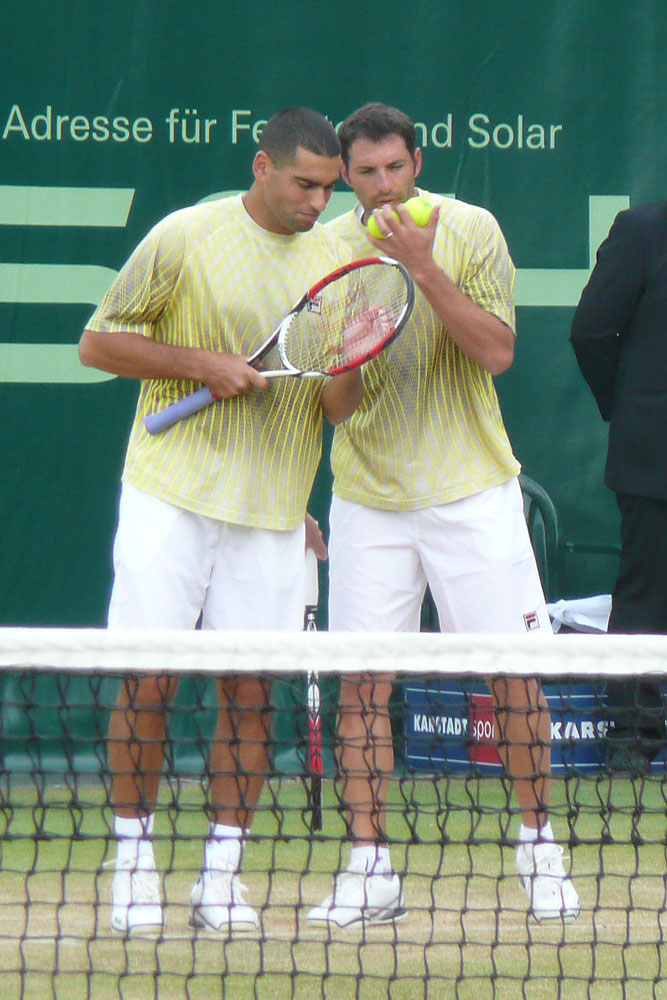
Ram/Erlich at the 2008 Gerry Weber Open

=== 2006–2010 ===
Erlich and Ram claimed the Adelaide title in March 2006, defeating Russians Dmitry Tursunov and Igor Kunitsyn 6–3, 6–2.

At the Cincinnati 1000 Masters, in August 2007, he and Ram won, upsetting the world No. 1 Bryan brothers in the final 4–6, 6–3, 13–11. In November 2007, they again defeated the No. 1 Bryan brothers at the Tennis Masters Cup in China, 7–6, 2–6, 6–1. At the 2007 US Open, he played doubles with Ram, losing to the eventual winners Simon Aspelin and Julian Knowle, 5–7, 6–7.

Erlich and Ram won their first Grand Slam at the 2008 Australian Open final against Arnaud Clément and Michaël Llodra 7–5, 7–6.

From September 2008 till May 2009 Erlich was recovering from right elbow surgery, and suffered setback after setback, while Ram was playing doubles with other partners. The Israel Open ATP Challenger tournament in May 2009 was the first where the two reunited. They proceeded to the tournament's final, where they lost to George Bastl and Chris Guccione 6–3, 7–6^{3}. After the tournament Ram announced that he was going to finish the season with his temporary partner Max Mirnyi, before returning to play with Erlich on a permanent basis. Later the same month, Erlich partnering Harel Levy won his first ATP tournament after returning to play, the Türk Telecom İzmir Cup (an ATP Challenger Tour event).

Erlich partnered with Novak Djokovic at the 2010 Queen's Club Championships winning the title. It is Djokovic's only doubles title in his career.

=== 2021: 400 career match wins ===
In May 2021, Erlich won his 22nd doubles title at the 2021 Belgrade Open out of 44 finals with partner Andrei Vasilevski, the win being one match away from reaching a milestone of 400 career match wins.

=== 2022: Retirement ===
Erlich announced his retirement after his participation at the 2022 Tel Aviv Open partnering Novak Djokovic in September. He had to withdraw in the last minute due to injury thus completing his professional career.

== Team participation ==
=== Davis Cup ===
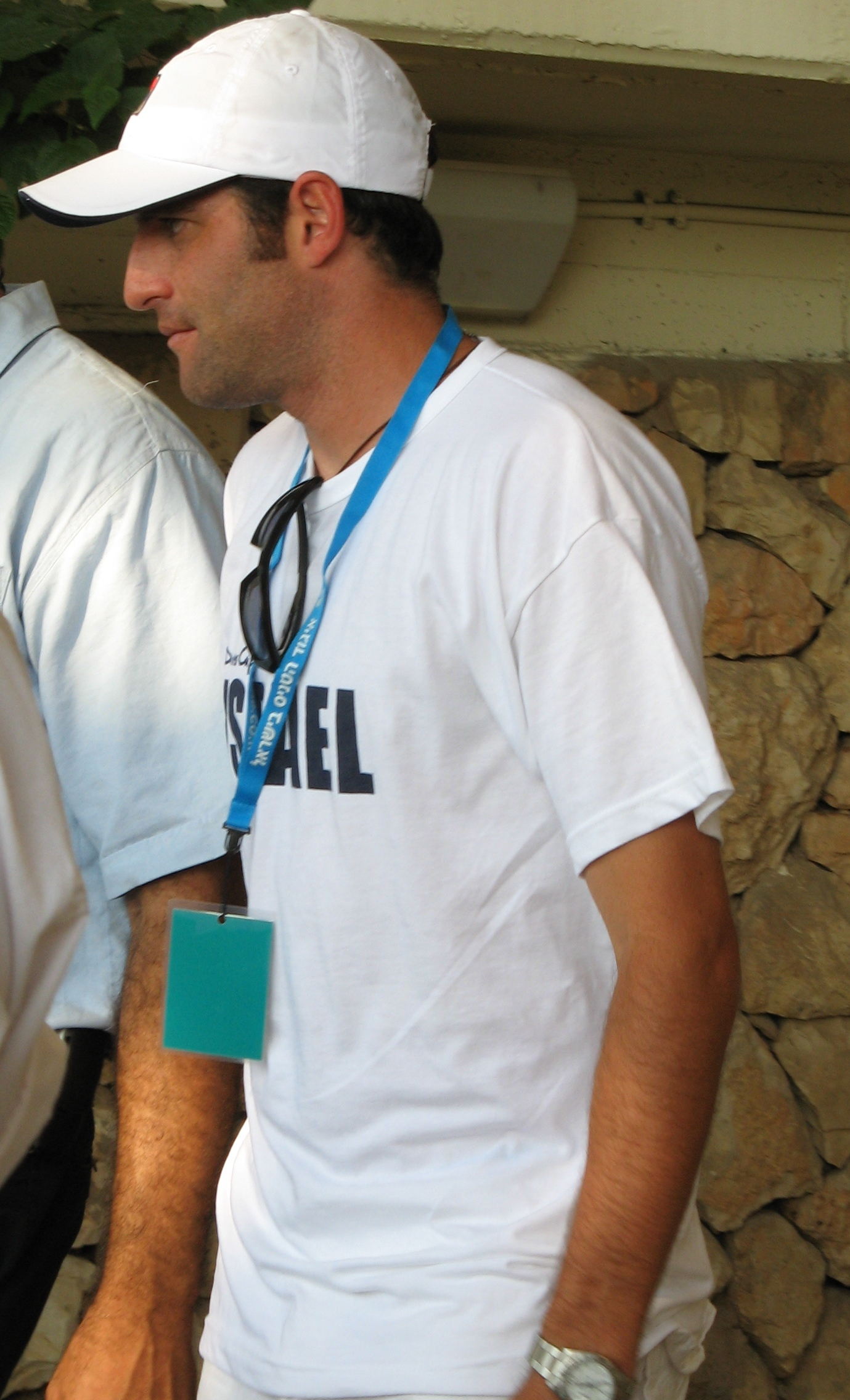
Erlich in Davis Cup competition

Playing for the Israel Davis Cup team in 2000 and from 2002 to 2009, he has won 12 of his 16 matches, including wins in Israel's 2006 win over Great Britain, 2007 win over Luxembourg, 2007 wins over Italy and Chile (in which he and Ram defeated Olympic Gold Medal winners González and Massú), and 2009 win over Russia.

Israel (ranked 8th in the Davis Cup standings, with 5,394 points) hosted heavily favored Russia (winners in 2002 and 2006, and the top-ranked country in Davis Cup standings, with 27,897 points) in a Davis Cup quarterfinal tie in July 2009, on indoor hard courts at the Nokia Arena in Tel Aviv. Israel was represented by Erlich, Ram, Dudi Sela, and Harel Levy. Russia's lineup consisted of Marat Safin (# 24 in the world; former world # 1), Igor Andreev (26), Igor Kunitsyn (35), and Mikhail Youzhny (44; former world # 8). The stage was set by Safin, who prior to the tie told the press: "With all due respect, Israel was lucky to get to the quarterfinals." The Israeli team's response was to beat the Russian team in each of their first three matches, thereby winning the tie. Levy, world # 210, beat Russia's top player, Andreev, world # 24, 6–4, 6–2, 4–6, 6–2 in the opening match. Sela (# 33) followed by beating Russian Youzhny 3–6, 6–1, 6–0, 7–5. Israeli captain Eyal Ran likened his players to two fighter jets on court, saying: "I felt as if I had two F-16s out there today, they played amazingly well." The match was attended by 10,500 people, the largest ever crowd ever for a tennis match held in Israel. The next day Erlich and Ram beat Safin and Kunitsyn 6–3, 6–4, 6–7, 4–6, 6–4 in front of a boisterous crowd of over 10,000. "This is something I will cherish for all of my life," said Erlich. He added, "Everybody has dreams, but there are some you don’t allow yourself to have, and beating Russia 3–0 was just like that .. but we have done it." Even the Saudi Gazette described the doubles match as a "thrilling" win. Ran was carried shoulder-high around the Tel Aviv stadium, as the 10,000-strong crowd applauded. With the tie clinched for Israel, the reverse singles rubbers were "dead", and instead of best-of-five matches, best-of-three sets were played, with the outcomes of little to no importance. Israel wrapped up a 4–1 victory over Russia, as Levy defeated Kunitsyn 6–4, 4–6, 7–6, while Sela retired with a wrist injury while down 3–4 in the first set against Andreev.

=== Olympics ===
Erlich and Ram represented Israel at the 2004 Summer Olympics in Athens, Greece, and reached the quarterfinals. They also represented Israel at the 2008 Summer Olympics in Beijing, China.

== Grand Slam finals ==
=== Doubles (1 title) ===
Result	Year	Championship	Surface	Partner	Opponents	Score
Win	2008	Australian Open	Hard	(Israel) Andy Ram	(France) Arnaud Clément (France) Michaël Llodra	7–5, 7–6^{(7–4)}

== ATP career finals ==
=== Doubles: 45 (22 titles, 23 runners-up) ===
Legend Grand Slam tournaments (1–0) ATP World Tour Finals (0–0) ATP World Tour Masters 1000 (2–4) ATP World Tour 500 Series (1–3) ATP World Tour 250 Series (18–16)	Titles by surface Hard (11–20) Clay (2–1) Grass (7–2) Carpet (2–0)	Titles by setting Outdoor (17–15) Indoor (5–8)

Result	W–L	Date	Tournament	Tier	Surface	Partner	Opponents	Score
Win	1–0	Jul 2000	Hall of Fame Tennis Championships, United States	International	Grass	(Israel) Harel Levy	(United Kingdom) Kyle Spencer (United States) Mitch Sprengelmeyer	7–6^{(7–2)}, 7–5
Win	2–0	Sep 2003	Thailand Open, Thailand	International	Hard (i)	(Israel) Andy Ram	(Australia) Andrew Kratzmann (Finland) Jarkko Nieminen	6–3, 7–6^{(7–4)}
Win	3–0	Oct 2003	Grand Prix de Tennis de Lyon, France	International	Carpet (i)	(Israel) Andy Ram	(France) Julien Benneteau (France) Nicolas Mahut	6–1, 6–3
Loss	3–1	Jan 2004	Chennai Open, India	International	Hard	(Israel) Andy Ram	(Spain) Rafael Nadal (Spain) Tommy Robredo	6–7^{(3–7)}, 6–4, 3–6
Loss	3–2	Feb 2004	Rotterdam Open, Netherlands	Intl. Gold	Hard (i)	(Israel) Andy Ram	(Australia) Paul Hanley (Czech Republic) Radek Štěpánek	7–5, 6–7^{(5–7)}, 5–7
Win	4–2	Oct 2004	Grand Prix de Tennis de Lyon, France (2)	International	Carpet (i)	(Israel) Andy Ram	(Sweden) Jonas Björkman (Czech Republic) Radek Štěpánek	7–6^{(7–2)}, 6–2
Win	5–2	Feb 2005	Rotterdam Open, Netherlands (2)	Intl. Gold	Hard (i)	(Israel) Andy Ram	(Czech Republic) Cyril Suk (Czech Republic) Pavel Vízner	6–4, 4–6, 6–3
Win	6–2	Jun 2005	Nottingham Open, United Kingdom	International	Grass	(Israel) Andy Ram	(Sweden) Simon Aspelin (Australia) Todd Perry	4–6, 6–3, 7–5
Loss	6–3	Jul 2005	Los Angeles Open, United States	International	Hard	(Israel) Andy Ram	(United States) Rick Leach (United States) Brian MacPhie	3–6, 4–6
Loss	6–4	Aug 2005	Canadian Open, Canada	Masters Series	Hard	(Israel) Andy Ram	(Zimbabwe) Wayne Black (Zimbabwe) Kevin Ullyett	7–6^{(7–5)}, 3–6, 0–6
Loss	6–5	Oct 2005	Thailand Open, Thailand (2)	International	Hard (i)	(Israel) Andy Ram	(Australia) Paul Hanley (India) Leander Paes	6–5^{(7–5)}, 1–6, 2–6
Loss	6–6	Oct 2005	Vienna Open, Austria	Intl. Gold	Hard (i)	(Israel) Andy Ram	(The Bahamas) Mark Knowles (Canada) Daniel Nestor	3–5, 4–5^{(4–7)}
Win	7–6	Jan 2006	Adelaide International, Australia	International	Hard	(Israel) Andy Ram	(Australia) Paul Hanley (Zimbabwe) Kevin Ullyett	7–6^{(7–4)}, 7–6^{(12–10)}
Loss	7–7	Feb 2006	Rotterdam Open, Netherlands (3)	Intl. Gold	Hard (i)	(Israel) Andy Ram	(Australia) Paul Hanley (Zimbabwe) Kevin Ullyett	6–7^{(4–7)}, 6–7^{(2–7)}
Loss	7–8	May 2006	Italian Open, Italy	Masters Series	Clay	(Israel) Andy Ram	(The Bahamas) Mark Knowles (Canada) Daniel Nestor	4–6, 7–5, [11–13]
Win	8–8	Jun 2006	Nottingham Open, UK (2)	International	Grass	(Israel) Andy Ram	(Russia) Igor Kunitsyn (Russia) Dmitry Tursunov	6–3, 6–2
Win	9–8	Aug 2006	Connecticut Open, United States	International	Hard	(Israel) Andy Ram	(Poland) Mariusz Fyrstenberg (Poland) Marcin Matkowski	6–3, 6–3
Win	10–8	Oct 2006	Thailand Open, Thailand (3)	International	Hard (i)	(Israel) Andy Ram	(United Kingdom) Andy Murray (United Kingdom) Jamie Murray	6–2, 2–6, [10–4]
Loss	10–9	Mar 2007	Las Vegas Open, United States	International	Hard	(Israel) Andy Ram	(United States) Bob Bryan (United States) Mike Bryan	6–7^{(6–8)}, 2–6
Loss	10–10	Mar 2007	Indian Wells Masters, United States	Masters Series	Hard	(Israel) Andy Ram	(Czech Republic) Martin Damm (India) Leander Paes	4–6, 4–6
Loss	10–11	Aug 2007	Washington Open, United States	International	Hard	(Israel) Andy Ram	(United States) Bob Bryan (United States) Mike Bryan	6–7^{(5–7)}, 6–3, [7–10]
Win	11–11	Aug 2007	Cincinnati Masters, United States	Masters Series	Hard	(Israel) Andy Ram	(United States) Bob Bryan (United States) Mike Bryan	4–6, 6–3, [13–11]
Win	12–11	Jan 2008	Australian Open, Australia	Grand Slam	Hard	(Israel) Andy Ram	(France) Arnaud Clément (France) Michaël Llodra	7–5, 7–6^{(7–4)}
Win	13–11	Mar 2008	Indian Wells Masters, United States	Masters Series	Hard	(Israel) Andy Ram	(Canada) Daniel Nestor (Serbia) Nenad Zimonjić	6–4, 6–4
Loss	13–12	Aug 2008	Cincinnati Masters, United States	Masters Series	Hard	(Israel) Andy Ram	(United States) Bob Bryan (United States) Mike Bryan	6–4, 6–7^{(2–7)}, [7–10]
Win	14–12	Jun 2010	Queen's Club Championships, United Kingdom	250 Series	Grass	(Serbia) Novak Djokovic	(Slovakia) Karol Beck (Czech Republic) David Škoch	7–6^{(8–6)}, 2–6, [10–3]
Loss	14–13	Oct 2010	Thailand Open, Thailand (4)	250 Series	Hard (i)	(Austria) Jürgen Melzer	(Germany) Christopher Kas (Serbia) Viktor Troicki	4–6, 4–6
Win	15–13	Jun 2011	Eastbourne International, United Kingdom	250 Series	Grass	(Israel) Andy Ram	(Bulgaria) Grigor Dimitrov (Italy) Andreas Seppi	6–3, 6–3
Win	16–13	Aug 2011	Winston-Salem Open, United States	250 Series	Hard	(Israel) Andy Ram	(Germany) Christopher Kas (Austria) Alexander Peya	7–6^{(7–2)}, 6–4
Loss	16–14	Jan 2012	Chennai Open, India	250 Series	Hard	(Israel) Andy Ram	(India) Leander Paes (Serbia) Janko Tipsarević	4–6, 4–6
Win	17–14	May 2012	Serbia Open, Serbia	250 Series	Clay	(Israel) Andy Ram	(Germany) Martin Emmrich (Sweden) Andreas Siljeström	4–6, 6–2, [10–6]
Loss	17–15	Jun 2013	Halle Open, Germany	250 Series	Grass	(Italy) Daniele Bracciali	(Mexico) Santiago González (United States) Scott Lipsky	2–6, 6–7^{(3–7)}
Loss	17–16	Jul 2014	Hall of Fame Tennis Championships, United States (2)	250 Series	Grass	(United States) Rajeev Ram	(Australia) Chris Guccione (Australia) Lleyton Hewitt	5–7, 4–6
Win	18–16	Oct 2015	Shenzhen Open, China	250 Series	Hard	(United Kingdom) Colin Fleming	(Australia) Chris Guccione (Brazil) André Sá	6–1, 6–7^{(3–7)}, [10–6]
Loss	18–17	Feb 2016	Open 13, France	250 Series	Hard (i)	(United Kingdom) Colin Fleming	(Croatia) Mate Pavić (New Zealand) Michael Venus	2–6, 3–6
Loss	18–18	Aug 2016	Los Cabos Open, Mexico	250 Series	Hard	(United Kingdom) Ken Skupski	(India) Purav Raja (India) Divij Sharan	6–7^{(4–7)}, 6–7^{(3–7)}
Loss	18–19	Jan 2017	Auckland Open, New Zealand	250 Series	Hard	(United States) Scott Lipsky	(Poland) Marcin Matkowski (Pakistan) Aisam-ul-Haq Qureshi	6–1, 2–6, [3–10]
Win	19–19	Oct 2017	Chengdu Open, China	250 Series	Hard	(Pakistan) Aisam-ul-Haq Qureshi	(New Zealand) Marcus Daniell (Brazil) Marcelo Demoliner	6–3, 7–6^{(7–3)}
Win	20–19	Jul 2018	Hall of Fame Tennis Championships, United States (3)	250 Series	Grass	(New Zealand) Artem Sitak	(El Salvador) Marcelo Arévalo (Mexico) Miguel Ángel Reyes-Varela	6–1, 6–2
Win	21–19	Jun 2019	Antalya Open, Turkey	250 Series	Grass	(New Zealand) Artem Sitak	(Croatia) Ivan Dodig (Slovakia) Filip Polášek	6–3, 6–4
Loss	21–20	Oct 2019	Chengdu Open, China	250 Series	Hard	(France) Fabrice Martin	(Serbia) Nikola Čačić (Serbia) Dušan Lajović	6–7^{(9–11)}, 6–3, [3–10]
Loss	21–21	Feb 2020	Maharashtra Open, India	250 Series	Hard	(Belarus) Andrei Vasilevski	(Sweden) André Göransson (Indonesia) Christopher Rungkat	2–6, 6–3, [8–10]
Loss	21–22	Feb 2021	Open Sud de France, France	250 Series	Hard (i)	(Belarus) Andrei Vasilevski	(Finland) Henri Kontinen (France) Édouard Roger-Vasselin	2–6, 5–7
Win	22–22	May 2021	Belgrade Open, Serbia	250 Series	Clay	(Belarus) Andrei Vasilevski	(Sweden) André Göransson (Brazil) Rafael Matos	6–4, 6–1
Loss	22–23	Sep 2021	Astana Open, Kazakhstan	250 Series	Hard (i)	(Belarus) Andrei Vasilevski	(Mexico) Santiago González (Argentina) Andrés Molteni	1–6, 2–6

== Challenger and Futures finals ==
=== Singles: 1 (0–1) ===
Legend (singles) ATP Challenger Tour (0–0) ITF Futures Tour (0–1)	Titles by surface Hard (0–1) Clay (0–0) Grass (0–0) Carpet (0–0)

Result	W–L	Date	Tournament	Tier	Surface	Opponent	Score
Loss	0–1	Jan 1999	India F1, Chandigarh	Futures	Hard	(Israel) Amir Hadad	3–6, 4–6

=== Doubles: 48 (32–16) ===
Legend (doubles) ATP Challenger Tour (24–12) ITF Futures Tour (8–4)	Titles by surface Hard (32–12) Clay (0–0) Grass (0–0) Carpet (0–4)

Result	W–L	Date	Tournament	Tier	Surface	Partner	Opponents	Score
Win	1–0	Jan 1998	India F1, New Delhi	Futures	Hard	(Israel) Noam Okun	(United Kingdom) Jamie Delgado (Israel) Lior Mor	6–7, 7–6, 7–6
Loss	1–1	Jan 1998	India F3, Indore	Futures	Hard	(Israel) Noam Okun	(Lebanon) Ali Hamadeh (United States) Andrew Rueb	6–7, 4–6
Loss	1–2	Mar 1998	Israel F1, Jaffa	Futures	Hard	(Israel) Amir Hadad	(Finland) Tapio Nurminen (Finland) Janne Ojala	2–6, 5–7
Win	2–2	Jan 1999	India F1, Chandigarh	Futures	Hard	(Israel) Amir Hadad	(France) Cédric Kauffmann (India) Fazaluddin Syed	5–7, 7–5, 6–4
Win	3–2	Feb 1999	Croatia F1, Zagreb	Futures	Hard	(Israel) Nir Welgreen	(Croatia) Ivan Cinkuš (Croatia) Krešimir Ritz	6–2, 6–1
Win	4–2	Mar 1999	Israel F1, Ashkelon	Futures	Hard	(Israel) Eyal Erlich	(Israel) Amir Hadad (Israel) Harel Levy	6–4, 6–2
Loss	4–3	Jun 1999	Ireland F1, Dublin	Futures	Carpet	(Israel) Amir Hadad	(Italy) Daniele Bracciali (Italy) Igor Gaudi	4–6, 6–3, 3–6
Win	5–3	Jan 2000	USA F2, Altamonte Springs	Futures	Hard	(Israel) Harel Levy	(Mexico) Óscar Ortiz (Venezuela) Jimy Szymanski	6–3, 6–4
Win	6–3	Apr 2000	Uzbekistan F1, Andijan	Futures	Hard	(Israel) Lior Mor	(Pakistan) Aisam Qureshi (Uzbekistan) Dmitriy Tomashevich	7–6^{(7–4)}, 6–4
Win	7–3	May 2000	Uzbekistan F2, Namangan	Futures	Hard	(Israel) Lior Mor	(Japan) Yaoki Ishii (Japan) Satoshi Iwabuchi	6–2, 4–6, 6–4
Win	1–0	May 2000	Fergana, Uzbekistan	Challenger	Hard	(Israel) Lior Mor	(Brazil) Daniel Melo (Brazil) Alexandre Simoni	6–4, 6–0
Win	2–0	Jun 2000	Denver, USA	Challenger	Hard	(Israel) Lior Mor	(Israel) Noam Behr (Israel) Andy Ram	6–4, 5–7, 6–2
Loss	2–1	Oct 2000	Bratislava, Slovakia	Challenger	Hard (i)	(North Macedonia) Aleksandar Kitinov	(Australia) Paul Hanley (South Africa) Paul Rosner	4–6, 4–6
Loss	2–2	Mar 2001	Andrézieux, France	Challenger	Hard (i)	(Israel) Noam Behr	(France) Julien Benneteau (France) Nicolas Mahut	3–6, 3–6
Loss	2–3	Mar 2001	Magdeburg, Germany	Challenger	Carpet (i)	(Croatia) Lovro Zovko	(Canada) Frédéric Niemeyer (Czech Republic) Radek Štěpánek	6–7^{(2–7)}, 6–7^{(3–7)}
Win	3–3	May 2001	Jerusalem, Israel	Challenger	Hard	(France) Michaël Llodra	(Israel) Noam Behr (Israel) Noam Okun	7–5, 4–6, 7–6^{(7–2)}
Win	4–3	Sep 2001	Istanbul, Turkey	Challenger	Hard	(France) Michaël Llodra	(Netherlands) Sander Groen (Germany) Michael Kohlmann	w/o
Win	5–3	Oct 2001	Grenoble, France	Challenger	Hard (i)	(Israel) Andy Ram	(South Africa) Paul Rosner (United States) Glenn Weiner	6–4, 3–6, 7–6^{(7–4)}
Win	6–3	Nov 2001	Puebla, Mexico	Challenger	Hard	(Israel) Andy Ram	(Switzerland) Marco Chiudinelli (Finland) Tuomas Ketola	6–4, 6–7^{(5–7)}, 6–1
Win	7–3	Dec 2001	San José, Costa Rica	Challenger	Hard	(Israel) Andy Ram	(Brazil) Daniel Melo (Federal Republic of Yugoslavia) Dušan Vemić	6–3, 6–3
Loss	7–4	Feb 2002	Brest, France	Challenger	Hard (i)	(Israel) Andy Ram	(Australia) Ben Ellwood (Australia) Stephen Huss	1–6, 4–6
Win	8–4	Mar 2002	Cherbourg, France	Challenger	Hard (i)	(Israel) Noam Behr	(France) Julien Benneteau (France) Lionel Roux	w/o
Win	9–4	Nov 2002	Reunion Island, Réunion	Challenger	Hard	(Argentina) Federico Browne	(Switzerland) Marco Chiudinelli (Czech Republic) Jaroslav Levinský	6–1, 4–6, 6–3
Loss	9–5	Dec 2002	Milan, Italy	Challenger	Carpet (i)	(North Macedonia) Aleksandar Kitinov	(Italy) Massimo Bertolini (Italy) Giorgio Galimberti	6–7^{(4–7)}, 6–2, 6–7^{(4–7)}
Loss	7–4	Feb 2003	Great Britain F2, Nottingham	Futures	Carpet (i)	(Israel) Harel Levy	(United Kingdom) Mark Hilton (Israel) Andy Ram	6–7^{(7–9)}, 2–6
Win	10–5	Mar 2003	Besançon, France	Challenger	Hard (i)	(Austria) Julian Knowle	(France) Richard Gasquet (France) Nicolas Mahut	6–3, 6–4
Win	8–4	Apr 2003	Greece F1, Syros	Futures	Hard	(Israel) Andy Ram	(Switzerland) Marco Chiudinelli (Italy) Uros Vico	6–3, 3–6, 6–3
Loss	10–6	May 2003	New Delhi, India	Challenger	Hard	(Israel) Andy Ram	(Bulgaria) Radoslav Lukaev (Russia) Dmitri Vlasov	6–7^{(6–8)}, 6–4, 2–6
Win	11–6	Jul 2003	Lexington, USA	Challenger	Hard	(Japan) Takao Suzuki	(United States) Matias Boeker (United States) Travis Parrott	6–4, 6–1
Win	12–6	Aug 2003	Binghamton, USA	Challenger	Hard	(Israel) Andy Ram	(Australia) Stephen Huss (South Africa) Myles Wakefield	6–4, 6–3
Win	13–6	Sep 2003	Istanbul, Turkey	Challenger	Hard	(Israel) Andy Ram	(Israel) Amir Hadad (Israel) Harel Levy	7–6^{(7–5)}, 7–6^{(8–6)}
Win	14–6	Nov 2003	Bratislava, Slovakia	Challenger	Hard (i)	(Israel) Harel Levy	(Croatia) Mario Ančić (Argentina) Martín García	7–6^{(9–7)}, 6–3
Win	15–6	Nov 2003	Dnipropetrovsk, Ukraine	Challenger	Hard (i)	(Israel) Harel Levy	(Sweden) Simon Aspelin (Argentina) Johan Landsberg	6–4, 6–3
Loss	15–7	Nov 2004	Bratislava, Slovakia	Challenger	Hard (i)	(Israel) Noam Okun	(Sweden) Simon Aspelin (United States) Graydon Oliver	6–7^{(5–7)}, 3–6
Win	16–7	Jul 2008	Ramat HaSharon, Israel	Challenger	Hard	(Israel) Andy Ram	(Ukraine) Sergei Bubka (Russia) Mikhail Elgin	6–3, 7–6^{(7–3)}
Loss	16–8	May 2009	Ramat HaSharon, Israel	Challenger	Hard	(Israel) Andy Ram	(Switzerland) George Bastl (Australia) Chris Guccione	5–7, 6–7^{(6–8)}
Win	17–8	May 2009	İzmir, Turkey	Challenger	Hard	(Israel) Harel Levy	(India) Prakash Amritraj (United States) Rajeev Ram	6–3, 6–3
Win	18–8	May 2010	Ramat HaSharon, Israel	Challenger	Hard	(Israel) Andy Ram	(Austria) Alexander Peya (Germany) Simon Stadler	6–4, 6–3
Win	19–8	Aug 2013	Vancouver, Canada	Challenger	Hard	(Israel) Andy Ram	(United States) James Cerretani (Canada) Adil Shamasdin	6–1, 6–4
Win	20–8	Aug 2013	Aptos, USA	Challenger	Hard	(Israel) Andy Ram	(Australia) Chris Guccione (Australia) Matt Reid	6–3, 6–7^{(6–8)}, [10–2]
Loss	20–9	Oct 2014	Rennes, France	Challenger	Hard (i)	(Czech Republic) František Čermák	(Germany) Tobias Kamke (Germany) Philipp Marx	6–3, 2–6, [3–10]
Loss	20–10	Apr 2016	Raanana, Israel	Challenger	Hard	(Austria) Philipp Oswald	(Russia) Konstantin Kravchuk (Ukraine) Denys Molchanov	6–4, 6–7^{(1–7)}, [4–10]
Win	21–10	Aug 2017	Aptos, USA	Challenger	Hard	(United Kingdom) Neal Skupski	(Australia) Alex Bolt (Australia) Jordan Thompson	6–3, 2–6, [10–8]
Loss	21–11	Oct 2017	Kaohsiung, Chinese Taipei	Challenger	Hard	(Austria) Alexander Peya	(Thailand) Sanchai Ratiwatana (Thailand) Sonchat Ratiwatana	4–6, 6–1, [6–10]
Win	22–11	Jan 2018	Canberra, Australia	Challenger	Hard	(India) Divij Sharan	(Chile) Hans Podlipnik-Castillo (Belarus) Andrei Vasilevski	7–6^{(7–1)}, 6–2
Loss	22–12	Mar 2019	Lille, France	Challenger	Hard	(France) Fabrice Martin	(Monaco) Romain Arneodo (France) Hugo Nys	5–7, 7–5, [8–10]
Win	23–12	Mar 2019	Saint Brieuc, France	Challenger	Hard (i)	(France) Fabrice Martin	(France) Jonathan Eysseric (Croatia) Antonio Šančić	7–6^{(7–2)}, 7–6^{(7–2)}
Win	24–12	Apr 2019	Taipei, Chinese Taipei	Challenger	Hard (i)	(India) Sriram Balaji	(Netherlands) Sander Arends (Austria) Tristan-Samuel Weissborn	6–3, 6–2

== Doubles performance timeline ==
Key
W	F	SF	QF	#R	RR	Q#	P#	DNQ	A	Z#	PO	G	S	B	NMS	NTI	P	NH

(W) winner; (F) finalist; (SF) semifinalist; (QF) quarterfinalist; (#R) rounds 4, 3, 2, 1; (RR) round-robin stage; (Q#) qualification round; (P#) preliminary round; (DNQ) did not qualify; (A) absent; (Z#) Davis/Fed Cup Zonal Group (with number indication) or (PO) play-off; (G) gold, (S) silver or (B) bronze Olympic/Paralympic medal; (NMS) not a Masters tournament; (NTI) not a Tier I tournament; (P) postponed; (NH) not held; (SR) strike rate (events won / competed); (W–L) win–loss record.
To avoid confusion and double counting, these charts are updated at the conclusion of a tournament or when the player's participation has ended.

Tournament	2000	2001	2002	2003	2004	2005	2006	2007	2008	2009	2010	2011	2012	2013	2014	2015	2016	2017	2018	2019	2020	2021	2022	SR	W–L
Grand Slam tournaments
Australian Open	A	1R	1R	A	2R	3R	2R	3R	W	A	QF	2R	1R	3R	1R	3R	1R	1R	1R	A	A	A	1R	1 / 17	20–16
French Open	A	A	1R	A	3R	A	2R	3R	3R	1R	2R	1R	2R	2R	3R	A	2R	2R	A	A	A	2R	1R	0 / 15	15–15
Wimbledon	A	2R	1R	SF	1R	3R	3R	2R	QF	1R	1R	1R	2R	1R	1R	SF	1R	1R	3R	1R	NH	1R		0 / 20	20–20
US Open	1R	A	A	1R	1R	QF	3R	3R	2R	1R	2R	2R	2R	2R	1R	1R	2R	A	1R	A	A	2R		0 / 16	14–16
Win–loss	0–1	1–2	0–3	4–2	3–4	7–3	6–4	7–4	12–3	0–3	5–4	2–4	3–4	4–4	2–3	6–3	2–4	1–3	2–3	0–1	0–0	2–3	0–1	1 / 67	69–66
Year-end championship
ATP Finals	Did not qualify						RR	RR	Did not qualify															0 / 2	2–4
ATP Masters Series
Indian Wells	Absent				2R	2R	1R	F	W	A	A	2R	A	1R	2R	Absent								1 / 8	13–7
Miami	Absent				2R	QF	SF	1R	1R	A	A	QF	Absent											0 / 6	8–6
Monte Carlo	Absent				2R	A	2R	2R	QF	Absent														0 / 4	1–4
Rome	Absent				1R	1R	F	2R	2R	Absent											1R	A		0 / 6	3–6
Madrid	Absent				1R	1R	QF	1R	Absent						1R	Absent								0 / 5	1–5
Canada	Absent				QF	F	2R	SF	2R	Absent														0 / 5	7–5
Cincinnati	Absent				QF	1R	SF	W	F	1R	Absent													1 / 6	11–5
Shanghai	Not Masters Series									A	2R	Absent												0 / 1	1–1
Paris	Absent					QF	1R	1R	A	1R	2R	Absent												0 / 5	2–5
Hamburg	Absent				1R	1R	QF	SF	2R	Not Masters Series														0 / 5	3–5
Win–loss	0–0	0–0	0–0	0–0	6–8	8–8	10–9	11–8	9–6	0–2	2–2	3–2	0–0	0–1	1–2	0–0	0–0	0–0	0–0	0–0	0–1	0–0	0–0	2 / 51	50–49
Year-end ranking	110	107	119	33	28	15	13	18	11	191	45	50	49	62	87	49	51	78	101	73	70	63			

== See also ==
- List of select Jewish tennis players
