= George Bastl =

Swiss tennis player

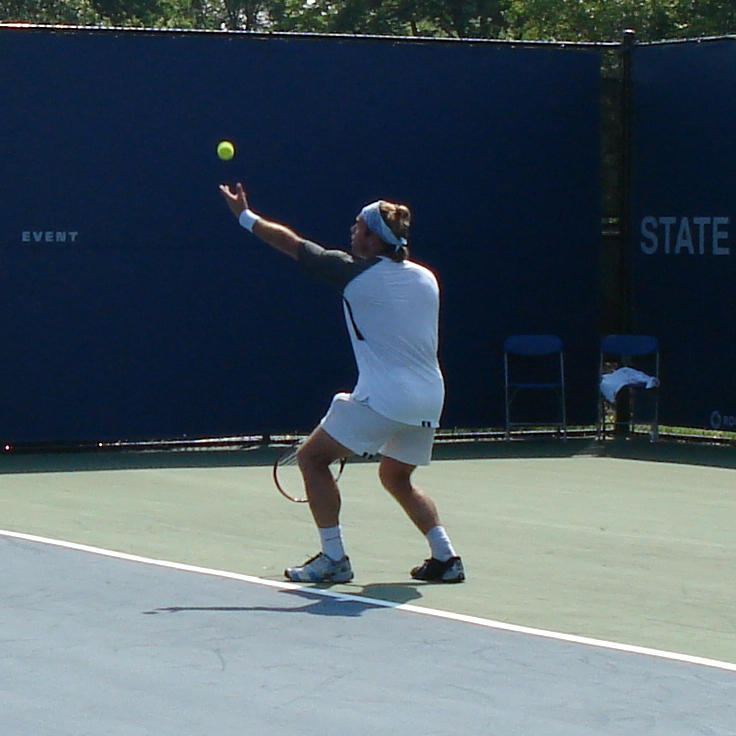
- Country (sports): Switzerland
- Born: 1 April 1975 (age 50); Ollon, Switzerland
- Height: 1.83 m (6 ft 0 in)
- Turned pro: 1998
- Plays: Right-handed (two-handed backhand)
- College: University of Southern California
- Prize money: US$1,271,109
- Official website: www.georgebastl.com

Singles
- Career record: 50–93
- Career titles: 0
- Highest ranking: No. 71 (1 May 2000)

Grand Slam singles results
- Australian Open: 1R (2000, 2001)
- French Open: 1R (2000)
- Wimbledon: 3R (2002)
- US Open: 2R (1999, 2001)

Doubles
- Career record: 24–36
- Career titles: 0
- Highest ranking: No. 73 (14 October 2002)

Grand Slam doubles results
- Australian Open: 1R (2002)
- French Open: 2R (2002)
- Wimbledon: 1R (2002)
- US Open: 3R (2002)
- Last updated on: 8 April 2025.

George Edward Bastl (born 1 April 1975) is a former professional tennis player from Switzerland.

== Tennis career ==
Bastl was an All-American at the University of Southern California.

He achieved a career-high singles ranking of World No. 71 in May 2000 and reached one ATP Tour singles final at Tashkent in 1999.

The biggest win of Bastl's tennis career came in the second round of the 2002 Wimbledon Championships, where he caused one of the biggest upsets in Wimbledon and Grand Slam history by defeating seven-time champion Pete Sampras, winning in five sets by the score of 6–3, 6–2, 4–6, 3–6, 6–4. Bastl had only been in the main draw of 2002 Wimbledon as a lucky loser, having previously lost to Alexander Waske in three straight sets in the final qualifying round at Roehampton. He beat Denis Golovanov in the first round and after beating Sampras he lost in the third round to eventual runner-up David Nalbandian. Bastl teamed up with Roger Federer in the men's doubles at the US Open in 2002. They got to the third round before being knocked out by Wayne Black and Kevin Ullyett.

Bastl was the first player to be beaten by Andy Murray in the main draw of a Grand Slam tournament, at Wimbledon in 2005, with Murray winning 6–4, 6–2, 6–2.

== ATP career finals ==
=== Singles: 1 (0 titles, 1 runner-up) ===
Legend Grand Slam Tournaments (0–0) ATP World Tour Finals (0–0) ATP World Tour Masters Series (0–0) ATP Championship Series (0–0) ATP World Series (0–1)	Finals by surface Hard (0–1) Clay (0–0) Grass (0–0) Carpet (0–0)	Finals by setting Outdoors (0–1) Indoors (0–0)

Result	W–L	Date	Tournament	Tier	Surface	Opponent	Score
Loss	0–1	Sep 1999	Tashkent, Uzbekistan	International Series	Hard	(Germany) Nicolas Kiefer	4–6, 2–6

== ATP Challenger and ITF Futures finals ==
=== Singles: 9 (4–5) ===
Legend ATP Challenger (4–5) ITF Futures (0–0)	Finals by surface Hard (1–5) Clay (0–0) Grass (0–0) Carpet (3–0)

Result	W–L	Date	Tournament	Tier	Surface	Opponent	Score
Loss	0–1	Nov 1998	Andorra, Andorra	Challenger	Hard	(United States) Justin Gimelstob	3–6, 6–2, 6–7
Win	1–1	Oct 1999	Eckental, Germany	Challenger	Carpet	(Czech Republic) Petr Luxa	7–6, 4–6, 6–4
Win	2–1	Dec 1999	Nümbrecht, Germany	Challenger	Carpet	(Czech Republic) Martin Damm	7–6, 6–3
Win	3–1	Oct 2001	Helsinki, Finland	Challenger	Hard	(Czech Republic) Ota Fukarek	6–4, 4–6, 6–4
Loss	3–2	Apr 2003	León, Mexico	Challenger	Hard	(Russia) Alex Bogomolov Jr	6–7^{(4–7)}, 7–6^{(7–3)}, 4–6
Win	4–2	Dec 2004	Milan, Italy	Challenger	Carpet	(Germany) Alexander Waske	7–6^{(7–5)}, 6–4
Loss	4–3	Jan 2005	Wrexham, United Kingdom	Challenger	Hard	(Russia) Vladimir Voltchkov	6–4, 4–6, 3–6
Loss	4–4	Nov 2005	Luxembourg, Luxembourg	Challenger	Hard	(Belgium) Christophe Rochus	2–6, 6–3, 1–6
Loss	4–5	May 2008	Fergana, Uzbekistan	Challenger	Hard	(Czech Republic) Pavel Snobel	5–7, 3–6

=== Doubles: 10 (7–3) ===
Legend ATP Challenger (7–3) ITF Futures (0–0)	Finals by surface Hard (4–2) Clay (1–1) Grass (0–0) Carpet (2–0)

Result	W–L	Date	Tournament	Tier	Surface	Partner	Opponents	Score
Loss	0–1	Aug 1996	Geneva, Switzerland	Challenger	Clay	(Switzerland) Michel Kratochvil	(Germany) Patrick Baur (Germany) Jens Knippschild	1–6, 1–6
Loss	0–2	Dec 1997	Burbank, United States	Challenger	Hard	(Germany) Patrik Gottesleben	(United States) Doug Flach (United States) Brian Macphie	6–7, 4–6
Win	1–2	Dec 2000	Milan, Italy	Challenger	Carpet	(Italy) Giorgio Galimberti	(Italy) Filippo Messori (Italy) Vincenzo Santopadre	6–4, 7–6^{(7–4)}
Win	2–2	Nov 2001	Eckental, Germany	Challenger	Carpet	(South Africa) Neville Godwin	(Switzerland) Yves Allegro (Netherlands) Marcus Hilpert	6–4, 4–6, 7–5
Win	3–2	Apr 2002	Tarzana, United States	Challenger	Hard	(South Africa) Neville Godwin	(United States) Brandon Coupe (United States) Kevin Kim	6–3, 4–6, 6–3
Win	4–2	Apr 2002	Paget, Bermuda	Challenger	Clay	(South Africa) Neville Godwin	(Paraguay) Ramón Delgado (Brazil) Alexandre Simoni	7–6^{(10–8)}, 6–3
Win	5–2	Sep 2004	Istanbul, Turkey	Challenger	Hard	(Germany) Bjorn Phau	(Italy) Daniele Bracciali (Netherlands) Fred Hemmes	6–1, 6–2
Loss	5–3	Nov 2008	Astana, Kazakhstan	Challenger	Hard	(Switzerland) Marco Chiudinelli	(Russia) Mikhail Elgin (Russia) Alexander Kudryavtsev	4–6, 7–6^{(10–8)}, [6–10]
Win	6–3	Apr 2009	Johannesburg, South Africa	Challenger	Hard	(Australia) Chris Guccione	(Russia) Mikhail Elgin (Russia) Alexander Kudryavtsev	6–2, 4–6, [11–9]
Win	7–3	May 2009	Ramat Hasharon, Israel	Challenger	Hard	(Australia) Chris Guccione	(Israel) Jonathan Erlich (Israel) Andy Ram	7–5, 7–6^{(8–6)}

== Performance timeline ==
Key
W	F	SF	QF	#R	RR	Q#	DNQ	A	NH

(W) winner; (F) finalist; (SF) semifinalist; (QF) quarterfinalist; (#R) rounds 4, 3, 2, 1; (RR) round-robin stage; (Q#) qualification round; (DNQ) did not qualify; (A) absent; (NH) not held; (SR) strike rate (events won / competed); (W–L) win–loss record.

=== Singles ===
Tournament	1996	1997	1998	1999	2000	2001	2002	2003	2004	2005	2006	2007	2008	2009	2010	2011	SR	W–L
Grand Slam tournaments
Australian Open	A	A	A	A	1R	1R	Q3	A	Q2	A	A	Q2	A	Q1	A	A	0 / 2	0–2
French Open	A	A	A	Q2	1R	Q2	Q2	Q2	A	Q2	Q1	Q1	A	Q1	A	A	0 / 1	0–1
Wimbledon	A	A	A	A	1R	Q1	3R	Q1	A	1R	Q3	Q1	Q1	A	A	A	0 / 3	2–3
US Open	A	A	Q2	2R	1R	2R	Q2	Q2	A	1R	1R	Q1	A	Q1	A	A	0 / 5	2–5
Grand Slam SR	0 / 0	0 / 0	0 / 0	0 / 1	0 / 4	0 / 2	0 / 1	0 / 0	0 / 0	0 / 2	0 / 1	0 / 0	0 / 0	0 / 0	0 / 0	0 / 0	0 / 11	4–11
Year End Ranking	437	293	194	85	105	115	160	277	201	128	173	464	233	523	707			
