= Israel Open =

- 2016 Israel Open

Defunct tennis tournament
- Event name: Electra Israel Open
- Location: Ramat HaSharon (2008–2010); Ra'anana (2015–)
- Venue: Ra'anana Tennis Center
- Category: ATP Challenger Tour
- Surface: Hard
- Draw: 32S/32Q/16D
- Prize money: $125,000

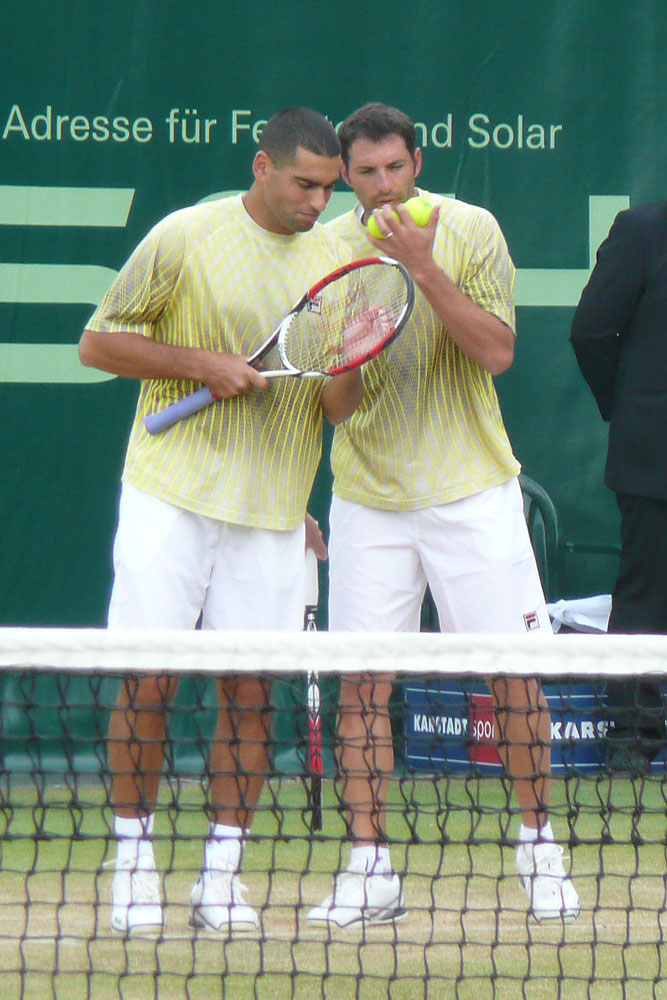
Israeli duo of Andy Ram and Jonathan Erlich took the inaugural doubles title

The Israel Open (also known as the Electra Israel Open) was a professional tennis tournament played on outdoor hardcourts. It was part of the ATP Challenger Tour. It was held in Ra'anana, Israel in 2015 and in 2016. The tournament was previously held in Ramat HaSharon, from 2008 to 2010.

== Past finals ==
=== Singles ===
Year	Champion	Runner-up	Score
2016	(Russia) Evgeny Donskoy	(Lithuania) Ričardas Berankis	6–4, 6–4
2015	(Georgia (country)) Nikoloz Basilashvili	(Slovakia) Lukáš Lacko	4–6, 6–4, 6–3
2011–2014	Not Held		
2010	(Republic of Ireland) Conor Niland	(Brazil) Thiago Alves	5–7, 7–6^{(7–5)}, 6–3
2009	(Chinese Taipei) Lu Yen-hsun	(Germany) Benjamin Becker	6–3, 3–1 retired
2008	(Turkey) Marsel İlhan	(Slovakia) Ivo Klec	6–4, 6–4

=== Doubles ===
Year	Champions	Runners-up	Score
2016	(Russia) Konstantin Kravchuk (Ukraine) Denys Molchanov	(Israel) Jonathan Erlich (Austria) Philipp Oswald	4–6, 7–6^{(7–1)}, [10–4]
2015	(Croatia) Mate Pavić (New Zealand) Michael Venus	(Australia) Rameez Junaid (Canada) Adil Shamasdin	6–1, 6–4
2011–2014	Not Held		
2010	(Israel) Jonathan Erlich (Israel) Andy Ram	(Austria) Alexander Peya (Germany) Simon Stadler	6–4, 6–3
2009	(Switzerland) George Bastl (Australia) Chris Guccione	(Israel) Jonathan Erlich (Israel) Andy Ram	7–5, 7–6^{(8–6)}
2008	(Israel) Jonathan Erlich (Israel) Andy Ram	(Ukraine) Sergei Bubka (Russia) Mikhail Elgin	6–3, 7–6^{(7–3)}
