= 2003 Rogers AT&T Cup – Doubles =

Doubles
- 2003 Canada Masters and the Rogers AT&T Cup

Final
- Champions: (Russia) Svetlana Kuznetsova (United States) Martina Navratilova
- Runners-up: (Venezuela) María Vento-Kabchi (Indonesia) Angelique Widjaja
- Score: 3–6, 6–3, 6–1

Details
- Draw: 28 (2WC/1Q)
- Seeds: 8

Events
Singles	men	women
Doubles	men	women
← 2002 ·	Canada Masters	· 2004 →
← 2002 ·	Rogers AT&T Cup	· 2004 →

Virginia Ruano Pascual and Paola Suárez were the defending champions, but lost in the second round to Jelena Dokić and Corina Morariu.

Svetlana Kuznetsova and Martina Navratilova won in the final 3–6, 6–3, 6–1, against María Vento-Kabchi and Angelique Widjaja.

== Seeds ==
The top four seeds receive a bye into the second round.

1. (Spain) Virginia Ruano Pascual / (Argentina) Paola Suárez (second round)
2. (Zimbabwe) Cara Black / (Russia) Elena Likhovtseva (second round)
3. (Slovakia) Daniela Hantuchová / (Slovakia) Janette Husárová (quarterfinals)
4. (Russia) Svetlana Kuznetsova / (United States) Martina Navratilova (champions)
5. (Russia) Elena Dementieva / (Russia) Lina Krasnoroutskaya (quarterfinals)
6. (South Africa) Liezel Huber / (Bulgaria) Magdalena Maleeva (semifinals)
7. (France) Émilie Loit / (Australia) Nicole Pratt (quarterfinals)
8. (Slovenia) Tina Križan / (Slovenia) Katarina Srebotnik (second round)

== Draw ==
=== Key ===
- Q = Qualifier
- WC = Wild card
- LL = Lucky loser
- Alt = Alternate
- SE = Special exempt
- PR = Protected ranking
- ITF = ITF entry
- JE = Junior exempt
- w/o = Walkover
- r = Retired
- d = Defaulted
- SR = Special ranking

=== Finals ===
Semifinals
(Venezuela) María Vento-Kabchi (Indonesia) Angelique Widjaja	4	7	6
6	(South Africa) Liezel Huber (Bulgaria) Magdalena Maleeva	6	6^{2}	3
4	(Russia) Svetlana Kuznetsova (United States) Martina Navratilova	7	3	6
(Russia) Nadia Petrova (France) Mary Pierce	6^{5}	6	3

Final
(Venezuela) María Vento-Kabchi (Indonesia) Angelique Widjaja	6	1	1
4	(Russia) Svetlana Kuznetsova (United States) Martina Navratilova	3	6	6

=== Top half ===
First round
(France) M Bartoli (Czech Republic) D Bedáňová	5	5
(Serbia and Montenegro) J Dokić (United States) C Morariu	7	7
(Belgium) E Callens (United States) M Tu	0	2
(Venezuela) M Vento-Kabchi (Indonesia) A Widjaja	6	6
(Italy) ME Camerin (Luxembourg) C Schaul	6^{1}	6	0
8	(Slovenia) T Križan (Slovenia) K Srebotnik	7	4	6
WC	(Canada) M Drake (Canada) M Marois	2	2
(Australia) A Molik (Spain) M Serna	6	6
(Japan) S Asagoe (Japan) N Miyagi	6	2	6
(Australia) E Dominikovic (Germany) M Weingärtner	2	6	2
(United States) L Granville (Russia) A Jidkova	2	4
6	(South Africa) L Huber (Bulgaria) M Maleeva	6	6

Second round
1	(Spain) V Ruano Pascual (Argentina) P Suárez	3	4
(Serbia and Montenegro) J Dokić (United States) C Morariu	6	6
(Venezuela) M Vento-Kabchi (Indonesia) A Widjaja	6	6
8	(Slovenia) T Križan (Slovenia) K Srebotnik	3	4
3	(Slovakia) D Hantuchová (Slovakia) J Husárová	6	6
(Australia) A Molik (Spain) M Serna	2	4
(Japan) S Asagoe (Japan) N Miyagi	5	2
6	(South Africa) L Huber (Bulgaria) M Maleeva	7	6

Quarterfinals
(Serbia and Montenegro) J Dokić (United States) C Morariu	6	5	5
(Venezuela) M Vento-Kabchi (Indonesia) A Widjaja	3	7	7
3	(Slovakia) D Hantuchová (Slovakia) J Husárová	4	1
6	(South Africa) L Huber (Bulgaria) M Maleeva	6	6

Semifinals
(Venezuela) M Vento-Kabchi (Indonesia) A Widjaja	4	7	6
6	(South Africa) L Huber (Bulgaria) M Maleeva	6	6^{2}	3

=== Bottom half ===
First round
7	(France) É Loit (Australia) N Pratt	2	7	6
(Italy) S Farina Elia (Italy) F Schiavone	6	5	4
Q	(Slovenia) T Pisnik (Thailand) T Tanasugarn	5	7	4
(Austria) B Schett (Colombia) F Zuluaga	7	6^{1}	6
(Greece) E Daniilidou (Italy) R Grande	6	6
(United States) J Craybas (Canada) S Jeyaseelan	3	2
5	(Russia) E Dementieva (Russia) L Krasnoroutskaya	6	6
WC	(Canada) M-È Pelletier (Canada) D Srebrovic	3	4
(Chinese Taipei) J Lee (Indonesia) W Prakusya	4	4
(Ukraine) J Vakulenko (United States) M Washington	6	6
(Russia) N Petrova (France) M Pierce	5	6	6
(Russia) A Myskina (Russia) V Zvonareva	7	0	3

Second round
7	(France) É Loit (Australia) N Pratt	6	6
(Austria) B Schett (Colombia) F Zuluaga	4	2
(Greece) E Daniilidou (Italy) R Grande	1	2
4	(Russia) S Kuznetsova (United States) M Navratilova	6	6
5	(Russia) E Dementieva (Russia) L Krasnoroutskaya	6	6
(Ukraine) J Vakulenko (United States) M Washington	3	1
(Russia) N Petrova (France) M Pierce	6	0	6
2	(Zimbabwe) C Black (Russia) E Likhovtseva	3	6	1

Quarterfinals
7	(France) É Loit (Australia) N Pratt	3	2
4	(Russia) S Kuznetsova (United States) M Navratilova	6	6
5	(Russia) E Dementieva (Russia) L Krasnoroutskaya	6	3	4
(Russia) N Petrova (France) M Pierce	3	6	6

Semifinals
4	(Russia) S Kuznetsova (United States) M Navratilova	7	3	6
(Russia) N Petrova (France) M Pierce	6^{5}	6	3

== Qualifying ==
=== Qualifying seeds ===
The top seeds receive a bye into the final round.

1. (United States) Tara Snyder / (Canada) Aneta Soukup (qualifying competition)
2. (Slovenia) Tina Pisnik / (Thailand) Tamarine Tanasugarn (qualified)

=== Qualifiers ===
1. (Slovenia) Tina Pisnik / (Thailand) Tamarine Tanasugarn

=== Qualifying draw ===
First round			Qualifying competition
			1	(United States) Tara Snyder (Canada) Aneta Soukup	2
			2	(Slovenia) Tina Pisnik (Thailand) Tamarine Tanasugarn	8
	(Canada) Stéphanie Dubois (Canada) Beier Ko	3	2	(Slovenia) Tina Pisnik (Thailand) Tamarine Tanasugarn	8
2	(Slovenia) Tina Pisnik (Thailand) Tamarine Tanasugarn	8
