= 2003 Rogers AT&T Cup – Singles =

Singles
- 2003 Canada Masters and the Rogers AT&T Cup

Final
- Champion: (Belgium) Justine Henin-Hardenne
- Runner-up: (Russia) Lina Krasnoroutskaya
- Score: 6–1, 6–0

Details
- Draw: 56 (4WC/12Q/1LL)
- Seeds: 16

Events
Singles	men	women
Doubles	men	women
← 2002 ·	Canada Masters	· 2004 →
← 2002 ·	Rogers AT&T Cup	· 2004 →

Justine Henin-Hardenne defeated Lina Krasnoroutskaya in the final, 6–1, 6–0 to win the women's singles tennis title at the 2003 Canadian Open.

Amélie Mauresmo was the defending champion, but lost in the quarterfinals to Elena Dementieva.

== Seeds ==
The top eight seeds receive a bye into the second round.

1. (Belgium) Kim Clijsters (third round)
2. (Belgium) Justine Henin-Hardenne (champion)
3. (France) Amélie Mauresmo (quarterfinals)
4. (Slovakia) Daniela Hantuchová (third round)
5. (Russia) Anastasia Myskina (third round)
6. (Bulgaria) Magdalena Maleeva (second round)
7. (South Africa) Amanda Coetzer (third round)
8. (Serbia and Montenegro) Jelena Dokić (third round)
9. (Russia) Elena Dementieva (semifinals)
10. (Russia) Vera Zvonareva (quarterfinals)
11. (Italy) Silvia Farina Elia (first round)
12. (Russia) Elena Bovina (quarterfinals)
13. (Greece) Eleni Daniilidou (first round)
14. (Russia) Nadia Petrova (third round)
15. (France) Nathalie Dechy (second round)
16. (Russia) Svetlana Kuznetsova (first round)

== Draw ==
=== Key ===
- Q = Qualifier
- WC = Wild card
- LL = Lucky loser
- Alt = Alternate
- ITF = ITF entry
- PR = Protected ranking
- SR = Special ranking
- SE = Special exempt
- JE = Junior exempt
- JR = Junior Accelerator Programme entrant
- CO = College Accelerator Programme entrant
- NG = Next Gen Accelerator Program entrant
- w/o = Walkover
- r = Retired
- d = Defaulted

=== Finals ===
Quarterfinals
(Russia) Lina Krasnoroutskaya	3	6	6
(Slovenia) Katarina Srebotnik	6	3	4
(Argentina) Paola Suárez	2	6	6
10	(Russia) Vera Zvonareva	6	2	4
9	(Russia) Elena Dementieva	3	6	6
3	(France) Amélie Mauresmo	6	4	2
12	(Russia) Elena Bovina	2	4
2	(Belgium) Justine Henin-Hardenne	6	6

Semifinals
(Russia) Lina Krasnoroutskaya	6	4	7
(Argentina) Paola Suárez	4	6	5
9	(Russia) Elena Dementieva	3	7	2
2	(Belgium) Justine Henin-Hardenne	6	6^{5}	6

Final
(Russia) Lina Krasnoroutskaya	1	0
2	(Belgium) Justine Henin-Hardenne	6	6

=== Top half ===
==== Section 1 ====
First round
Q	(Russia) A Jidkova	5	3
(Italy) F Schiavone	7	6
(France) V Razzano	6	6
Q	(Spain) A Parra	2	4
(Russia) L Krasnoroutskaya	6	3	7
13	(Greece) E Daniilidou	0	6	5
11	(Italy) S Farina Elia	4	5
(Slovenia) K Srebotnik	6	7
(France) É Loit	6	6^{5}	6
WC	(Canada) M Marois	4	7	2
(Slovenia) T Pisnik	5	3
(Spain) M Serna	7	6

Second round
1	(Belgium) K Clijsters	6	6
(Italy) F Schiavone	1	2
(France) V Razzano	3	2
(Russia) L Krasnoroutskaya	6	6
(Slovenia) K Srebotnik	6	3	6
(France) É Loit	1	6	3
(Spain) M Serna	2	6	6
6	(Bulgaria) M Maleeva	6	3	4

Third round
1	(Belgium) K Clijsters	6	4	1
(Russia) L Krasnoroutskaya	1	6	6
(Slovenia) K Srebotnik	6	7
(Spain) M Serna	1	6^{4}

Quarterfinals
(Russia) L Krasnoroutskaya	3	6	6
(Slovenia) K Srebotnik	6	3	4

==== Section 2 ====
First round
Q	(United States) J Craybas	6	6
WC	(Canada) M Drake	3	1
WC	(France) M Pierce	6	6
Q	(Venezuela) M Vento-Kabchi	1	1
(Argentina) P Suárez	6	7
16	(Russia) S Kuznetsova	4	6^{1}
10	(Russia) V Zvonareva	6	7
(Austria) B Schett	1	6^{3}
WC	(Canada) M-È Pelletier	2	7	5
Q	(United States) M Washington	6	5	7
(Switzerland) E Gagliardi	2	2
Q	(Indonesia) A Widjaja	6	6

Second round
4	(Slovakia) D Hantuchová	6	6
(United States) J Craybas	1	2
WC	(France) M Pierce	4	5
(Argentina) P Suárez	6	7
10	(Russia) V Zvonareva	6	6
Q	(United States) M Washington	1	1
Q	(Indonesia) A Widjaja	4	4
8	(Serbia and Montenegro) J Dokić	6	6

Third round
4	(Slovakia) D Hantuchová	2	0
(Argentina) P Suárez	6	6
10	(Russia) V Zvonareva	6	6
8	(Serbia and Montenegro) J Dokić	3	2

Quarterfinals
(Argentina) P Suárez	2	6	6
10	(Russia) V Zvonareva	6	2	4

=== Bottom half ===
==== Section 3 ====
First round
Q	(Australia) N Pratt	6	6
Q	(Canada) B Ko	1	3
Q	(Italy) ME Camerin	6	4	5
LL	(Slovakia) J Husárová	3	6	7
(Australia) A Molik	3	6^{7}
9	(Russia) E Dementieva	6	7
15	(France) N Dechy	4	6	6
(Thailand) T Tanasugarn	6	3	4
(Colombia) F Zuluaga	6	6
Q	(United States) M Tu	3	2
(Russia) E Likhovtseva	7	6
(Russia) M Sharapova	6^{4}	1

Second round
5	(Russia) A Myskina	3	7	6
Q	(Australia) N Pratt	6	6^{2}	4
LL	(Slovakia) J Husárová	1	1
9	(Russia) E Dementieva	6	6
15	(France) N Dechy	2	5
(Colombia) F Zuluaga	6	7
(Russia) E Likhovtseva	6	1	2
3	(France) A Mauresmo	3	6	6

Third round
5	(Russia) A Myskina	6	1	1
9	(Russia) E Dementieva	2	6	6
(Colombia) F Zuluaga	4	2
3	(France) A Mauresmo	6	6

Quarterfinals
9	(Russia) E Dementieva	3	6	6
3	(France) A Mauresmo	6	4	2

==== Section 4 ====
First round
Q	(Japan) S Obata	7	6
(Japan) S Asagoe	5	4
(Italy) R Grande	2	6	3
(Zimbabwe) C Black	6	2	6
(Spain) M Sánchez Lorenzo	2	4
12	(Russia) E Bovina	6	6
14	(Russia) N Petrova	6	6
(Germany) M Weingärtner	0	0
(United States) L Granville	3	3
(Spain) V Ruano Pascual	6	6
Q	(Madagascar) D Randriantefy	1	0
(France) M Bartoli	6	6

Second round
7	(South Africa) A Coetzer	7	6
(Japan) S Obata	6^{1}	4
(Zimbabwe) C Black	3	2
12	(Russia) E Bovina	6	6
14	(Russia) N Petrova	6	4	7
(Spain) V Ruano Pascual	3	6	6^{3}
(France) M Bartoli	3	3
2	(Belgium) J Henin-Hardenne	6	6

Third round
7	(South Africa) A Coetzer	2	1
12	(Russia) E Bovina	6	6
14	(Russia) N Petrova	3	5
2	(Belgium) J Henin-Hardenne	6	7

Quarterfinals
12	(Russia) E Bovina	2	4
2	(Belgium) J Henin-Hardenne	6	6

== Qualifying ==
=== Qualifying seeds ===
1. (Germany) ~~Marlene Weingärtner~~ (moved to the main draw)
2. (Australia) Nicole Pratt (qualified)
3. (Indonesia) Angelique Widjaja (qualified)
4. (Slovakia) Janette Husárová (qualifying competition, lucky loser)
5. (United States) Jill Craybas (qualified)
6. (Czech Republic) Dája Bedáňová (qualifying competition)
7. (Belgium) Els Callens (qualifying competition, withdrew)
8. (Madagascar) Dally Randriantefy (qualified)
9. (Japan) Saori Obata (qualified)
10. (Venezuela) María Vento-Kabchi (qualified)
11. (Italy) Maria Elena Camerin (qualified)
12. (Ukraine) Julia Vakulenko (qualifying competition)
13. (Spain) Arantxa Parra Santonja (qualified)
14. (Luxembourg) Claudine Schaul (qualifying competition)
15. (Russia) Alina Jidkova (qualified)
16. (Australia) Evie Dominikovic (first round)
17. (Paraguay) ~~Rossana de los Ríos~~ (withdrew due to an ankle injury)
18. (United States) Meilen Tu (qualified)
19. (United States) Mashona Washington (qualified)
20. (United States) Tara Snyder (qualifying competition)
21. (Indonesia) Wynne Prakusya (qualifying competition)
22. (Chinese Taipei) Janet Lee (qualifying competition)
23. (Bulgaria) Svetlana Krivencheva (qualifying competition)
24. (Canada) Diana Srebrovic (qualifying competition)
25. (Canada) Sonya Jeyaseelan (qualifying competition)
26. (Canada) Beier Ko (qualified)

=== Qualifiers ===
1. (Russia) Alina Jidkova
2. (Australia) Nicole Pratt
3. (Indonesia) Angelique Widjaja
4. (United States) Meilen Tu
5. (United States) Jill Craybas
6. (United States) Mashona Washington
7. (Canada) Beier Ko
8. (Madagascar) Dally Randriantefy
9. (Japan) Saori Obata
10. (Venezuela) María Vento-Kabchi
11. (Italy) Maria Elena Camerin
12. (Spain) Arantxa Parra Santonja

=== Lucky loser ===
1. (Slovakia) Janette Husárová

=== Qualifying draw ===
==== First qualifier ====
First round				Qualifying competition
				25	(Canada) Sonya Jeyaseelan	6^{11}	1
	(Canada) Ekaterina Shulaeva	1	1	15	(Russia) Alina Jidkova	7^{13}	6
15	(Russia) Alina Jidkova	6	6

==== Second qualifier ====
First round				Qualifying competition
				2	(Australia) Nicole Pratt	6	6
	(Canada) Aneta Soukup	2	1	21	(Indonesia) Wynne Prakusya	2	2
21	(Indonesia) Wynne Prakusya	6	6

==== Third qualifier ====
First round				Qualifying competition
				3	(Indonesia) Angelique Widjaja	6	6
	(Canada) Nancy Loeffler-Caro	0	0	23	(Bulgaria) Svetlana Krivencheva	3	3
23	(Bulgaria) Svetlana Krivencheva	6	6

==== Fourth qualifier ====
First round	Qualifying competition
	4	(Slovakia) Janette Husárová	6	2	1
	18	(United States) Meilen Tu	2	6	6

==== Fifth qualifier ====
First round				Qualifying competition
				5	(United States) Jill Craybas	6	6
WC	(Canada) Katarina Zoricic	2	3	22	(Chinese Taipei) Janet Lee	1	1
22	(Chinese Taipei) Janet Lee	6	6

==== Sixth qualifier ====
First round	Qualifying competition
	6	(Czech Republic) Dája Bedáňová	5	6	6^{4}
	19	(United States) Mashona Washington	7	2	7^{7}

==== Seventh qualifier ====
First round				Qualifying competition
				7	(Belgium) Els Callens
WC	(Canada) Monika Dancevic	6^{3}	3	26	(Canada) Beier Ko	w/o
26	(Canada) Beier Ko	7^{7}	6

==== Eighth qualifier ====
First round				Qualifying competition
				8	(Madagascar) Dally Randriantefy	7	5	6
	(Canada) Stéphanie Dubois	6	7		(Canada) Stéphanie Dubois	5	7	1
16	(Australia) Evie Dominikovic	3	5

==== Ninth qualifier ====
First round				Qualifying competition
				9	(Japan) Saori Obata	6	6
WC	(Canada) Mélanie Gloria	0	2	20	(United States) Tara Snyder	1	3
20	(United States) Tara Snyder	6	6

==== Tenth qualifier ====
First round	Qualifying competition
	10	(Venezuela) María Vento-Kabchi	6	6
	14	(Luxembourg) Claudine Schaul	3	1

==== Eleventh qualifier ====
First round				Qualifying competition
				11	(Italy) Maria Elena Camerin	6	6
	(Canada) Aleksandra Wozniak	3	4	24	(Canada) Diana Srebrovic	2	3
24	(Canada) Diana Srebrovic	6	6

==== Twelfth qualifier ====
First round	Qualifying competition
	12	(Ukraine) Julia Vakulenko	6	0	2
	13	(Spain) Arantxa Parra Santonja	3	6	6
