= Clearwater Women's Open =

Tennis tournament in Florida, US

ITF Women's Tour
- Event name: Clearwater
- Location: Clearwater, Florida, United States
- Category: ITF Women's Circuit
- Surface: Hard
- Draw: 32S/32Q/16D
- Prize money: $25,000

The Clearwater Women's Open was a tournament for professional female tennis players played on outdoor hardcourts. The event was classified as a $25,000 ITF Women's Circuit tournament and was held in Clearwater, Florida, United States, from 2005 to 2012.

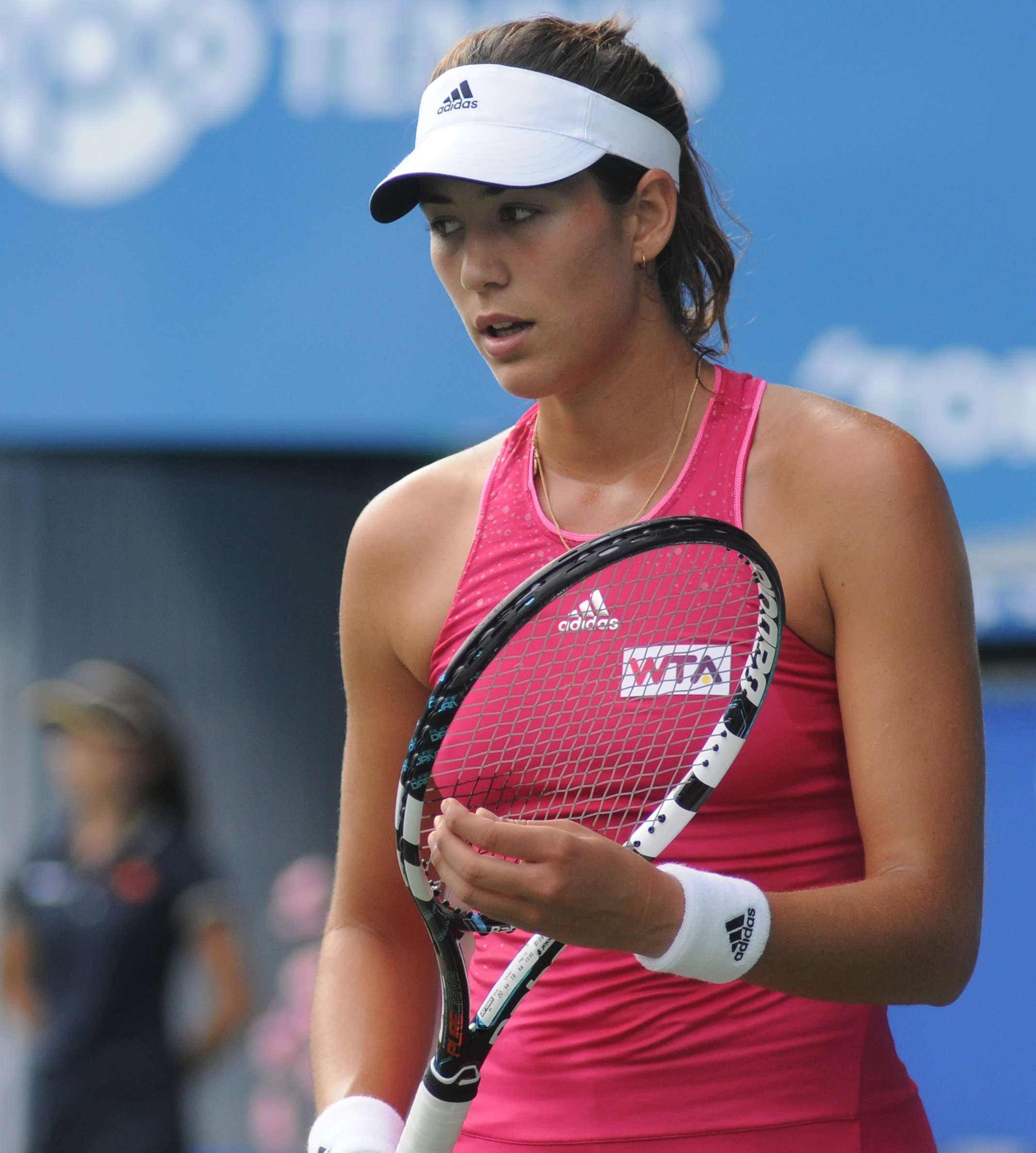
The last champion of the tournament's edition, Garbiñe Muguruza, won the 2016 French Open.

== Past finals ==
=== Singles ===
Year	Champion	Runner-up	Score
2012	(Spain) Garbiñe Muguruza	(United States) Grace Min	6–0, 6–1
2011	(Croatia) Ajla Tomljanović	(Kazakhstan) Sesil Karatantcheva	7–6^{(7–3)}, 6–3
2010	(Sweden) Johanna Larsson	(China) Zhang Shuai	7–6^{(7–4)}, 6–0
2009	(France) Julie Coin	(Belgium) Yanina Wickmayer	3–6, 1–1 default
2008	(Russia) Regina Kulikova	(Ukraine) Yevgenia Savranska	6–4, 6–4
2007	(Slovakia) Stanislava Hrozenská	(United States) Madison Brengle	6–4, 6–3
2006	(Argentina) Clarisa Fernández	(Italy) Alberta Brianti	7–5, 6–2
2005	(United States) Ahsha Rolle	(Romania) Anda Perianu	6–4, 6–3

=== Doubles ===
Year	Champions	Runners-up	Score
2012	(Georgia (country)) Ekaterine Gorgodze (Ukraine) Alyona Sotnikova	(United Kingdom) Naomi Broady (United Kingdom) Heather Watson	6–3, 6–2
2011	(United States) Kimberly Couts (Latvia) Līga Dekmeijere	(Canada) Heidi El Tabakh (Russia) Arina Rodionova	6–1, 6–4
2010	(China) Xu Yifan (China) Zhou Yimiao	(Russia) Alina Jidkova (Germany) Laura Siegemund	6–4, 6–4
2009	(Czech Republic) Lucie Hradecká (Czech Republic) Michaela Paštiková	(Italy) Maria Elena Camerin (Belgium) Yanina Wickmayer	default
2008	(United Kingdom) Anna Fitzpatrick (Serbia) Ana Veselinović	(Chinese Taipei) Chan Chin-wei (Japan) Seiko Okamoto	6–2, 3–6, [10–6]
2007	(Japan) Ryoko Fuda (Japan) Seiko Okamoto	(Bosnia and Herzegovina) Mervana Jugić-Salkić (Italy) Antonella Serra Zanetti	5–7, 6–3, 6–4
2006	(Republic of Ireland) Kelly Liggan (Lithuania) Lina Stančiūtė	(South Africa) Natalie Grandin (South Africa) Chanelle Scheepers	6–3, 6–1
2005	(United States) Lauren Fisher (United States) Amanda Johnson	(Russia) Anna Bastrikova (Belarus) Natallia Dziamidzenka	4–6, 6–4, 6–3
