= Aleke Tsoubanos =

American tennis player and coach

- Full name: Aleke Joy Tsoubanos
- Country (sports): United States
- Born: April 27, 1982 (age 43)
- Height: 5 ft 6 in (168 cm)
- Plays: Right-handed
- Prize money: $27,273

Singles
- Career record: 32–45
- Career titles: 0
- Highest ranking: No. 431 (May 8, 2006)

Doubles
- Career record: 92–70
- Career titles: 4 ITF
- Highest ranking: No. 126 (April 23, 2007)

Aleke Joy Tsoubanos (born April 27, 1982) is an American former professional tennis player.

Tsoubanos, the daughter of Greek-born parents, is originally from St. Louis and played collegiate tennis for Vanderbilt University. She was a member of the Vanderbilt team which finished runner-up in the 2001 NCAA Championships and was a three-time ITA doubles All-American.

Graduating from Vanderbilt University in 2004, Tsoubanos competed on the professional tour until 2007, reaching career-high rankings of 431 in singles and 126 in doubles. She was a WTA Tour doubles quarterfinalist at Rabat and Quebec City in 2006. Her four titles on the ITF Women's Circuit all came as a doubles player.

In 2020, she was named as the new head coach of women's tennis at Vanderbilt University, where she had served as an assistant coach for the previous 13 years.

== ITF finals ==
Legend
$75,000 tournaments
$50,000 tournaments
$25,000 tournaments
$10,000 tournaments

=== Doubles: 12 (4–8) ===
Outcome	No.	Date	Tournament	Surface	Partner	Opponents	Score
Winner	1.	July 25, 2004	ITF Evansville, United States	Hard	(United States) Kelly Schmandt	(United States) Vania King (Egypt) Heidi El Tabakh	6–4, 6–4
Winner	2.	September 19, 2004	ITF Matamoros, Mexico	Hard	(United States) Lauren Fisher	(United States) Tamara Encina (United States) Alison Ojeda	6–3, 6–7^{(7)}, 7–6^{(5)}
Runner-up	1.	October 3, 2004	ITF Pelham, United States	Clay	(United States) Sarah Riske	(Belarus) Natallia Dziamidzenka (Latvia) Līga Dekmeijere	3–6, 1–6
Runner-up	2.	May 28, 2005	ITF Houston, United States	Hard	(United States) Raquel Kops-Jones	(Romania) Anda Perianu (United States) Kaysie Smashey	6–4, 2–6, 4–6
Runner-up	3.	June 5, 2005	ITF Hilton Head, United States	Hard	(United States) Ansley Cargill	(United States) Shadisha Robinson (United States) Robin Stephenson	3–6, 5–7
Winner	3.	January 15, 2006	ITF Tampa, United States	Hard	(South Africa) Chanelle Scheepers	(Chinese Taipei) Chan Chin-wei (Chinese Taipei) Hsu Wen-hsin	3–6, 7–6^{(4)}, 6–3
Runner-up	4.	February 19, 2006	ITF Saguenay, Canada	Hard (i)	(United States) Raquel Atawo	(Italy) Alberta Brianti (Italy) Giulia Casoni	6–4, 7–6^{(4)}
Runner-up	5.	September 24, 2006	ITF Albuquerque, United States	Hard	(United States) Christina Fusano	(Venezuela) Milagros Sequera (United States) Julie Ditty	1–6, 4–6
Runner-up	6.	October 15, 2006	ITF San Francisco, United States	Hard	(United States) Christina Fusano	(United States) Laura Granville (United States) Carly Gullickson	3–6, 1–6
Runner-up	7.	November 19, 2006	ITF Lawrenceville, United States	Hard	(United States) Christina Fusano	(New Zealand) Leanne Baker (United States) Julie Ditty	6–7^{(5)}, 4–6
Runner-up	8.	December 3, 2006	ITF San Diego, United States	Hard	(United States) Christina Fusano	(Croatia) Ivana Abramović (Czech Republic) Hana Šromová	4–6, 3–6
Winner	4.	May 19, 2007	ITF Palm Beach Gardens, United States	Clay	(Australia) Monique Adamczak	(Uruguay) Estefanía Craciún (Argentina) Betina Jozami	7–5, 2–6, 6–3
