= Teryn Ashley =

American tennis player (born 1978)

- Country (sports): United States
- Residence: Chestnut Hill, Massachusetts, U.S.
- Born: December 12, 1978 (age 46) Boston, Massachusetts, U.S.
- Height: 5 ft 9 in (1.75 m)
- Turned pro: April 2001
- Retired: January 2006
- Plays: Right-handed (two-handed backhand)
- Prize money: $265,877

Singles
- Career record: 143–106
- Career titles: 4 ITF
- Highest ranking: No. 95 (July 5, 2004)

Grand Slam singles results
- Australian Open: Q3 (2005)
- French Open: 1R (2004)
- Wimbledon: 2R (2004)
- US Open: 1R (2004)

Doubles
- Career record: 120–65
- Career titles: 1 WTA, 12 ITF
- Highest ranking: No. 59 (October 27, 2003)

Grand Slam doubles results
- Australian Open: 1R (2003)
- French Open: 2R (2003)
- Wimbledon: 1R (2003, 2004, 2005)
- US Open: 2R (2002, 2003)

Teryn Ashley-Fitch (born December 12, 1978) is an American former professional tennis player. She won 17 titles in her career, four in singles (all ITF). In July 2004, she reached her highest singles ranking of world No. 95. Her career-high doubles ranking is 59, achieved in October 2003.

== Career ==
Ashley played her first match at an ITF event in San Antonio, Texas on 8 January 1996, losing in the second qualifying round to Tu Dong.

Her best Grand Slam result came at the 2004 Wimbledon Championships, where she defeated Tina Pisnik to enter the second round, where she was overpowered by 27th seeded Alicia Molik.

At the Auckland Open held in New Zealand in 2003, Teryn won her only WTA Tour title, playing alongside Abigail Spears to beat Cara Black and Elena Likhovtseva in the final.

Ashley also won the Dow Tennis Classic doubles event with Abigail Spears held 2003 in Midland, Michigan, which was her biggest ITF Women's Circuit title, beating Bethanie Mattek and Shenay Perry in the final.

At the 2002 US Open, Ashley partnered Sarah Taylor to reach the second round of the doubles draw, defeating Laura Montalvo and Elena Tatarkova, 6–4, 4–6, 6–4.

In Paris at the 2003 French Open, she paired-up with Spears to beat Renata Voráčová and Marlene Weingärtner to reach the second round.

At the 2003 US Open, she paired-up again with Spears to beat Bianka Lamade and Anastasia Myskina in three sets to reach round two for the second consecutive year.

In her career overall, she won one WTA doubles title, four ITF singles and twelve ITF doubles titles. She enjoyed a successful doubles partnership with compatriot Abigail Spears.

Teryn retired from tennis in January 2006, after losing in the first round of singles and doubles at a $25k event in Tampa, Florida. She lost her singles match to Tatjana Malek.

== Personal life ==
Teryn was born and raised by parents Allen and Anne in Boston, Massachusetts. She was introduced to tennis by her mother at the age of nine and preferred clay courts. Ashley resides in Ann Arbor, Michigan, and attended Stanford University in 2001.

Teryn married Brian Fitch in August 2008. The couple have a daughter, Abby, and two sons, William and Nico.

== Awards ==
Ashley was a two-time NCAA champion, in 1997 and 1999, and a three-time All-American.

== WTA career finals ==
=== Doubles: 1 title ===
| Date | Tournament | Tier | Surface | Partner | Opponents | Score |
|---|---|---|---|---|---|---|
| Jan 2003 | Auckland Open, New Zealand | Tier IV | Hard | (United States) Abigail Spears | (Zimbabwe) Cara Black (Russia) Elena Likhovtseva | 6–2, 2–6, 6–0 |

== ITF Circuit titles ==
$100,000 tournaments
$75,000 tournaments
$50,000 tournaments
$25,000 tournaments
$10,000 tournaments

=== Singles (4–3) ===
| Result | No. | Date | Tournament | Surface | Opponent | Score |
|---|---|---|---|---|---|---|
| Win | 1. | May 27, 2001 | ITF El Paso, United States | Hard | (Canada) Alison Nash | 6–1, 6–1 |
| Win | 2. | July 1, 2001 | ITF Lachine, Canada | Hard | (Canada) Diana Srebrovic | 2–6, 6–4, 6–0 |
| Loss | 1. | March 31, 2002 | ITF Lawrenceville, United States | Hard | (Canada) Maureen Drake | 3–6, 4–6 |
| Loss | 2. | July 14, 2002 | ITF College Park, United States | Hard | (United States) Sarah Taylor | 6–7^{(3)}, 6–3, 6–7^{(3)} |
| Loss | 3. | February 23, 2003 | ITF Columbus, United States | Hard (i) | (Czech Republic) Michaela Paštiková | 6–3, 5–7, 5–7 |
| Win | 3. | September 21, 2003 | ITF Columbus, United States | Hard | (United States) Tara Snyder | 6–3, 6–1 |
| Win | 4. | November 9, 2003 | ITF Pittsburgh, United States | Hard | (United States) Meilen Tu | 1–6, 6–3, 6–3 |

=== Doubles (12–8) ===
| Result | No. | Date | Tournament | Surface | Partner | Opponents | Score |
|---|---|---|---|---|---|---|---|
| Win | 1. | June 3, 2001 | ITF Lake Ozark, United States | Hard | (Republic of Ireland) Claire Curran | (Canada) Alison Nash (United States) Andrea Nathan | 7–5, 6–1 |
| Win | 2. | February 24, 2002 | ITF Columbus, United States | Hard | (United States) Kristen Schlukebir | (Russia) Maria Goloviznina (Russia) Eugenia Kulikovskaya | 4–6, 6–4, 6–2 |
| Loss | 1. | March 31, 2002 | Lawrenceville, United States | Hard | (United States) Kristen Schlukebir | (Japan) Akiko Morigami (Japan) Saori Obata | 5–7, 6–7^{(2)} |
| Loss | 2. | May 19, 2002 | Charlottesville, United States | Clay | (United States) Kristen Schlukebir | (United States) Erika deLone (South Africa) Jessica Steck | 2–6, 6–2, 5–7 |
| Win | 3. | July 7, 2002 | ITF Los Gatos, United States | Hard | (Canada) Vanessa Webb | (Japan) Ryoko Takemura (Japan) Yuka Yoshida | 6–3, 6–4 |
| Loss | 3. | July 14, 2002 | ITF College Park, United States | Hard | (United States) Jennifer Russell | (Japan) Miho Saeki (Japan) Yuka Yoshida | 5–7, 1–6 |
| Loss | 4. | September 22, 2002 | ITF Columbus, United States | Hard | (United States) Ashley Harkleroad | (Australia) Lisa McShea (Kazakhstan) Irina Selyutina | w/o |
| Loss | 5. | October 27, 2002 | Frisco, United States | Hard | (United States) Abigail Spears | (Japan) Nana Smith (United States) Brie Rippner | 6–4, 4–6, 1–6 |
| Win | 4. | February 9, 2003 | ITF Midland, United States | Hard | (United States) Abigail Spears | (United States) Bethanie Mattek (United States) Shenay Perry | 6–1, 4–6, 6–4 |
| Loss | 6. | March 2, 2003 | Saint Paul, United States | Hard | (United States) Abigail Spears | (China) Li Ting (China) Sun Tiantian | 3–6, 1–6 |
| Win | 5. | April 20, 2003 | ITF Jackson, United States | Clay | (United States) Abigail Spears | (Australia) Lisa McShea (Australia) Christina Wheeler | 6–1, 6–3 |
| Loss | 7. | August 2, 2003 | ITF Louisville, United States | Hard | (United States) Shenay Perry | (United States) Julie Ditty (Australia) Lisa McShea | 6–7^{(4)}, 7–6^{(6)}, 3–6 |
| Win | 6. | September 21, 2003 | ITF Columbus, United States | Hard | (United States) Allison Baker | (Argentina) María Emilia Salerni (Romania) Andreea Vanc | 6–3, 6–7^{(4)}, 6–2 |
| Win | 7. | November 16, 2003 | ITF Eugene, United States | Hard | (United States) Shenay Perry | (Russia) Alina Jidkova (Belarus) Tatiana Poutchek | 3–6, 6–2, 6–4 |
| Win | 8. | October 3, 2004 | ITF Troy, United States | Hard | (United States) Laura Granville | (United States) Bethanie Mattek (United States) Shenay Perry | 2–6, 3–0 ret. |
| Win | 9. | November 14, 2004 | ITF Pittsburgh, United States | Hard | (United States) Laura Granville | (Belgium) Els Callens (Australia) Samantha Stosur | 2–6, 6–3, 6–4 |
| Win | 10. | July 3, 2005 | ITF Los Gatos, United States | Hard | (United States) Carly Gullickson | (United States) Lindsay Lee-Waters (United States) Kaysie Smashey | 6–4, 4–6, 6–1 |
| Loss | 8. | July 17, 2005 | ITF Louisville, United States | Hard | (United States) Julie Ditty | (Belarus) Natallia Dziamidzenka (Romania) Anda Perianu | 5–7, 6–2, 4–6 |
| Win | 11. | October 2, 2005 | ITF Ashland, United States | Hard | (United States) Amy Frazier | (Brazil) Maria Fernanda Alves (United States) Ahsha Rolle | 6–1, 6–4 |
| Win | 12. | November 13, 2005 | ITF Pittsburgh, United States | Hard | (United States) Carly Gullickson | (United States) Ashley Harkleroad (United States) Bethanie Mattek | 6–1, 6–0 |
