= Milagros Sequera =

Venezuelan tennis player (born 1980)

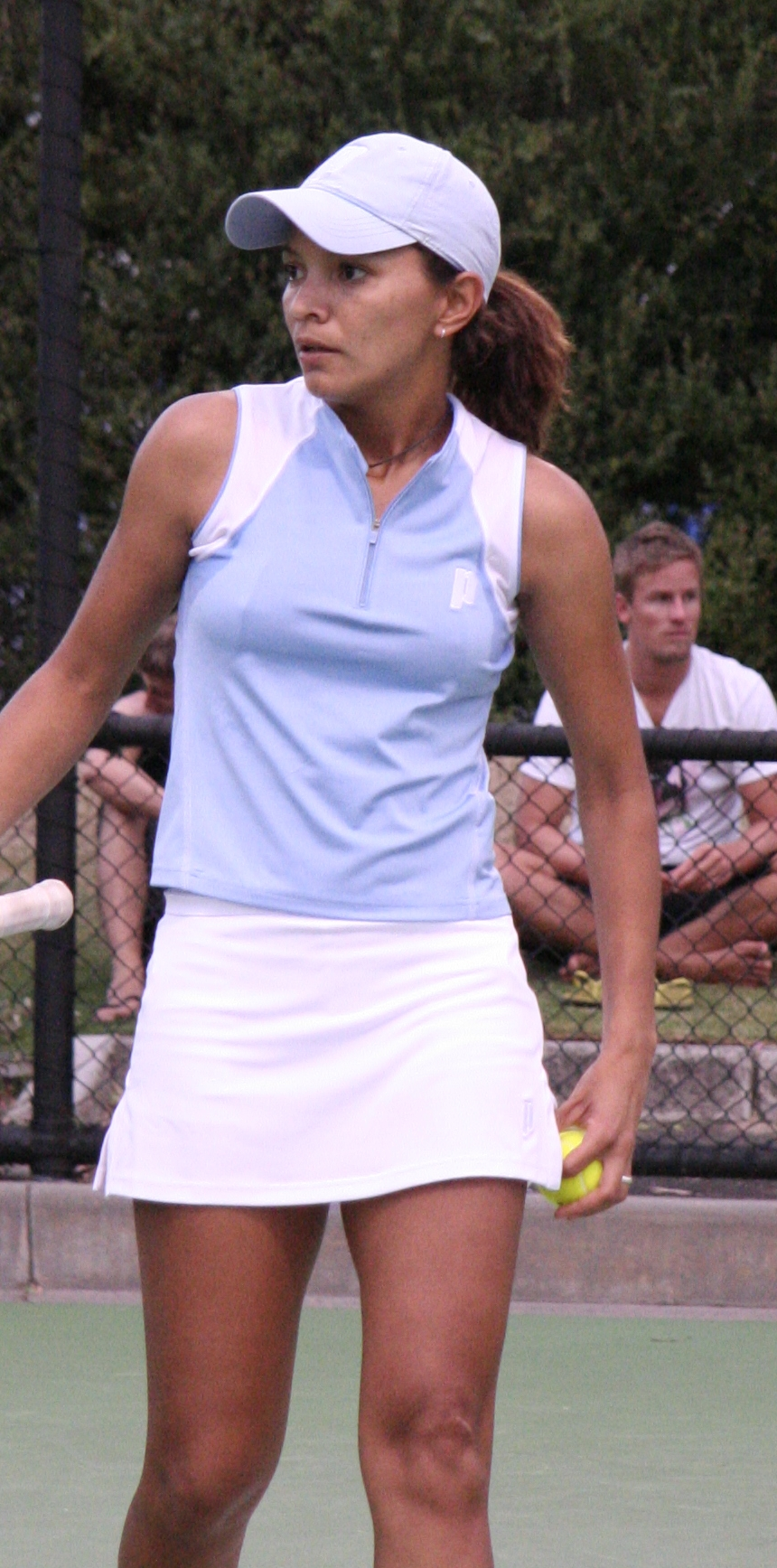
- At the 2007 Australian Open
- Country (sports): Venezuela
- Residence: San Diego, California, U.S.
- Born: 30 September 1980 (age 45) San Felipe, Venezuela
- Height: 1.65 m (5 ft 5 in)
- Turned pro: 1999
- Retired: 2009
- Plays: Right-handed (two-handed backhand)
- Prize money: $845,115

Singles
- Career record: 314–211
- Career titles: 1 WTA, 11 ITF
- Highest ranking: No. 48 (9 July 2007)

Grand Slam singles results
- Australian Open: 2R (2007)
- French Open: 2R (2007, 2008)
- Wimbledon: 3R (2007)
- US Open: 2R (2003)

Doubles
- Career record: 207–132
- Career titles: 3 WTA, 18 ITF
- Highest ranking: No. 29 (31 January 2005)

Grand Slam doubles results
- Australian Open: 4R (2005)
- French Open: 3R (2003, 2004)
- Wimbledon: 4R (2003, 2005)
- US Open: 3R (2004, 2006)

Team competitions
- Fed Cup: 36–11

Milagros Sequera
Medal record

Women's Tennis

Representing Venezuela

Pan American Games
Gold medal – first place	2003 Santo Domingo	Singles
Gold medal – first place	2007 Rio de Janeiro	Singles

Milagros Sequera Huss (Spanish pronunciation: [miˈlaɣɾos seˈkeɾa]; born 30 September 1980) is a Venezuelan former professional tennis player.

== Career ==
She joined the WTA Tour in 1999 and was ranked world No. 48 in July 2007. Her coach was Larry Willens. She was introduced to the game at the age of seven. Her favorite surface was hardcourt.

She won her first title in Fes, Morocco, in May 2007, defeating Aleksandra Wozniak in the final.

Sequera won the gold medal at the 2003 Pan American Games in Santo Domingo, Dominican Republic, winning the final against Sarah Taylor, and again in the 2007 Pan American Games in Rio de Janeiro, Brazil, winning the final against Mariana Duque Marino.

Sequera retired from professional tennis in 2009.

== Personal ==
Milagros currently resides in San Diego with her husband, Stephen Huss, whom she married in the Dandenong Ranges, near Melbourne, Australia, on 29 December 2009.

She was born on the same day as Martina Hingis. She also played team competition for the German tennis club TC RW Dinslaken for several years in the 1990s.

== WTA career finals ==
=== Singles: 2 (1 title, 1 runner-up) ===
Legend
Tier I (0–0)
Tier II (0–0)
Tier III (1–1)
Tier IV & V (0–0)

Result	No.	Date	Tournament	Surface	Opponent	Score
Loss	1.	Nov 2003	Tournoi de Québec, Canada	Carpet (i)	(Russia) Maria Sharapova	2–6, ret.
Win	1.	May 2007	Morocco Open	Clay	(Canada) Aleksandra Wozniak	6–1, 6–3

=== Doubles: 4 (3 titles, 1 runner-up) ===
Result	No.	Date	Tournament	Surface	Partner	Opponents	Score
Win	1.	Mar 2004	Acapulco, Mexico	Clay	(Australia) Lisa McShea	(Czech Republic) Olga Blahotová (Czech Republic) Gabriela Navrátilová	2–6, 7–6^{(7–5)}, 6–4
Win	2.	May 2004	Strasbourg, France	Clay	(Australia) Lisa McShea	(Slovenia) Tina Križan (Slovenia) Katarina Srebotnik	6–4, 6–1
Loss	1.	June 2004	Birmingham, England	Grass	(Australia) Lisa McShea	(Russia) Maria Kirilenko (Russia) Maria Sharapova	2–6, 1–6
Win	3.	June 2004	Rosmalen Open, Netherlands	Grass	(Australia) Lisa McShea	(Croatia) Jelena Kostanić (Luxembourg) Claudine Schaul	7–6^{(7–3)}, 6–3

== ITF Circuit finals ==
$100,000 tournaments
$75,000 tournaments
$50,000 tournaments
$25,000 tournaments
$10,000 tournaments

=== Singles: 17 (11–6) ===
Result	No.	Date	Tournament	Surface	Opponent	Score
Win	1.	3 November 1996	ITF Tamaulipas, Mexico	Hard	(United States) Aurora Gima	4–6, 6–3, 6–4
Win	2.	9 November 1997	ITF Santo Domingo, Dominican Republic	Clay	(Switzerland) Aliénor Tricerri	6–2, 4–6, 6–0
Loss	1.	17 May 1999	ITF Jackson, United States	Clay	(Slovakia) Daniela Hantuchová	1–6, 2–6
Win	3.	27 June 1999	ITF Easton, United States	Hard	(Philippines) Maricris Fernandez	7–5, 6–2
Win	4.	4 July 1999	ITF Montreal, Canada	Hard	(Sweden) Kristina Triska	7–6, 7–6
Win	5.	23 April 2000	ITF San Luis Potosí, Mexico	Clay	(Colombia) Catalina Castaño	6–4, 3–6, 7–5
Loss	2.	23 October 2000	ITF Dallas, United States	Hard	(United States) Jennifer Hopkins	2–6, 1–6
Win	6.	28 October 2001	ITF Dallas, United States	Hard	(Kazakhstan) Irina Selyutina	5–7, 6–2, 6–0
Loss	3.	4 November 2001	ITF Hayward, United States	Hard	(Kazakhstan) Irina Selyutina	5–7, 4–6
Win	7.	28 April 2002	Dothan Pro Classic, United States	Clay	(United States) Liezel Huber	7–6, 4–6, 6–1
Loss	4.	22 April 2003	Dothan Pro Classic, United States	Clay	(Japan) Akiko Morigami	3–6, 4–6
Loss	5.	22 September 2003	ITF Albuquerque, United States	Hard	(Puerto Rico) Kristina Brandi	2–6, 2–6
Win	8.	24 April 2005	Dothan Pro Classic, United States	Clay	(United States) Varvara Lepchenko	2–6, 6–2, 6–4
Win	9.	27 February 2006	ITF St. Paul, United States	Hard (i)	(Luxembourg) Claudine Schaul	6–1, 6–2
Loss	6.	25 April 2006	ITF Lafayette, United States	Clay	(Ukraine) Yuliana Fedak	7–5, 2–6, 4–6
Win	10.	8 October 2006	ITF Troy, United States	Hard	(United States) Ahsha Rolle	7–5, 6–0
Win	11.	7 July 2008	ITF Allentown, United States	Hard	(United States) Amanda Fink	6–2, 6–0

=== Doubles: 27 (18–9) ===
Result	No.	Date	Tournament	Surface	Partner	Opponents	Score
Loss	1.	16 June 1997	ITF Klosters, Switzerland	Clay	(Uruguay) Elena Juricich	(Netherlands) Kim Kilsdonk (Netherlands) Jolanda Mens	7–6^{(8)}, 4–6, 2–6
Win	2.	18 August 1997	ITF Margarita, Venezuela	Clay	(Uruguay) Elena Juricich	(Argentina) Mariana López Palacios (Argentina) Jorgelina Torti	7–6^{(4)}, 7–5
Loss	3.	9 November 1997	ITF Santo Domingo, Dominican Republic	Clay	(United States) Jacquelyn Rosen	(United States) Erica Adams (United States) Rebecca Jensen	3–6, 3–6
Win	4.	30 August 1999	ITF Querétaro, Mexico	Clay	(Slovakia) Gabriela Voleková	(Brazil) Joana Cortez (Brazil) Carla Tiene	4–6, 6–3, 6–4
Win	5.	1 May 2000	ITF Coatzacoalcos, Mexico	Hard	(Slovakia) Gabriela Voleková	(Brazil) Joana Cortez (Brazil) Miriam D'Agostini	4–6, 6–3, 7–5
Loss	6.	5 June 2000	ITF Hilton Head, United States	Hard	(Slovakia) Gabriela Voleková	(United States) Wendy Fix (India) Manisha Malhotra	4–6, 6–7^{(3)}
Loss	7.	30 October 2000	ITF Hayward, United States	Hard	(Republic of Ireland) Kelly Liggan	(Japan) Nana Smith (India) Nirupama Sanjeev	2–4, 2–4
Win	8.	2 April 2001	ITF Juárez, Mexico	Clay	(Spain) Alicia Ortuño	(Argentina) Erica Krauth (Argentina) Vanesa Krauth	6–4, 2–6, 6–2
Loss	9.	5 August 2001	ITF Lexington, United States	Hard	(United States) Julie Ditty	(Australia) Lisa McShea (Japan) Nana Miyagi	2–6, 1–6
Loss	10.	6 April 2002	ITF Jackson, United States	Clay	(Argentina) Gisela Dulko	(Australia) Lisa McShea (Australia) Christina Wheeler	2–6, 4–6
Win	11.	13 May 2002	ITF Szczecin, Poland	Clay	(Canada) Vanessa Webb	(Czech Republic) Olga Vymetálková (Czech Republic) Gabriela Chmelinová	6–7^{(5)}, 7–5, 6–3
Win	12.	24 September 2002	ITF Albuquerque, United States	Hard	(Italy) Francesca Lubiani	(Ukraine) Tatiana Perebiynis (Australia) Christina Wheeler	1–6, 7–5, 7–5
Win	13.	13 October 2002	ITF Hallandale Beach, United States	Hard	(Argentina) Gisela Dulko	(Czech Republic) Petra Cetkovská (Czech Republic) Barbora Strýcová	6–2, 7–5
Loss	14.	15 October 2002	ITF Sedona, United States	Hard	(Australia) Christina Wheeler	(United States) Jennifer Russell (United States) Mashona Washington	6–7^{(3)}, 5–7
Loss	15.	10 November 2002	ITF Pittsburgh, United States	Hard	(Japan) Nana Smith	(United States) Amy Frazier (United States) Jennifer Russell	4–6, 2–6
Win	16.	17 November 2002	ITF Eugene, United States	Hard	(Japan) Nana Smith	(Russia) Evgenia Kulikovskaya (Ukraine) Elena Tatarkova	3–6, 6–2, 6–4
Win	17.	22 April 2003	Dothan Pro Classic, United States	Clay	(Australia) Christina Wheeler	(United States) Julie Ditty (United States) Varvara Lepchenko	5–7, 6–1, 6–2
Win	18.	28 September 2003	ITF Albuquerque, United States	Hard	(United States) Samantha Reeves	(United States) Amanda Augustus (Canada) Mélanie Marois	6–3, 6–2
Win	19.	25 April 2004	Dothan Pro Classic, United States	Clay	(Australia) Lisa McShea	(China) Peng Shuai (China) Xie Yanze	6–7^{(6)}, 6–4, 6–2
Loss	20.	12 April 2005	ITF Jackson, United States	Clay	(United States) Ahsha Rolle	(Australia) Anastasia Rodionova (United States) Kristen Schlukebir	1–6, 6–3, 2–6
Win	21.	26 September 2005	ITF Albuquerque, United States	Hard	(United States) Julie Ditty	(Indonesia) Romana Tedjakusuma (Thailand) Napaporn Tongsalee	6–3, 6–7^{(6)}, 7–6^{(2)}
Win	22.	9 October 2005	ITF Troy, United States	Hard	(United States) Julie Ditty	(Georgia (country)) Salome Devidze (Luxembourg) Mandy Minella	6–2, 6–2
Win	23.	12 February 2006	Midland Classic, United States	Hard	(United States) Meilen Tu	(Argentina) María José Argeri (Brazil) Letícia Sobral	4–6, 7–5, 6–4
Win	24.	24 February 2006	ITF St. Paul, United States	Hard	(United States) Julie Ditty	(Czech Republic) Eva Hrdinová (Czech Republic) Michaela Paštiková	4–6, 7–6^{(5)}, 6–2
Win	25.	25 April 2006	ITF Lafayette, United States	Clay	(Czech Republic) Hana Šromová	(Ukraine) Yuliana Fedak (Czech Republic) Eva Hrdinová	2–6, 6–1, 6–1
Win	26.	24 September 2006	ITF Albuquerque, United States	Hard	(United States) Julie Ditty	(United States) Christina Fusano (United States) Aleke Tsoubanos	6–1, 6–4
Win	27.	1 October 2006	ITF Ashland, United States	Hard	(United States) Julie Ditty	(United States) Ashley Harkleroad (Hungary) Ágnes Szávay	6–3, 5–7, 6–2
