= 2003 Canada Masters – Singles =

Singles
- 2003 Canada Masters and the Rogers AT&T Cup

Final
- Champion: (United States) Andy Roddick
- Runner-up: (Argentina) David Nalbandian
- Score: 6–1, 6–3

Details
- Draw: 64 (4WC/8Q/1LL)
- Seeds: 16

Events
| Singles | men | women |
| Doubles | men | women |
- Canada Masters Rogers AT&T Cup

Andy Roddick defeated David Nalbandian in the final, 6–1, 6–3 to win the men's singles tennis title at the 2003 Canada Masters.

Guillermo Cañas was the reigning champion, but did not compete that year.

== Seeds ==
A champion seed is indicated in bold text while text in italics indicates the round in which that seed was eliminated.

1. (United States) Andre Agassi (quarterfinals)
2. (Spain) Juan Carlos Ferrero (third round)
3. (Switzerland) Roger Federer (semifinals)
4. (Spain) Carlos Moyá (first round)
5. (Australia) Lleyton Hewitt (second round)
6. (United States) **Andy Roddick (champion)**
7. (Argentina) Guillermo Coria (first round)
8. (Germany) Rainer Schüttler (semifinals)
9. (France) Sébastien Grosjean (third round)
10. (Czech Republic) Jiří Novák (third round)
11. (Thailand) Paradorn Srichaphan (third round)
12. (Netherlands) Sjeng Schalken (first round)
13. (Brazil) Gustavo Kuerten (first round)
14. (Chile) Fernando González (first round)
15. (Netherlands) Martin Verkerk (second round)
16. (Spain) Tommy Robredo (third round)

== Draw ==
Key

- Q = Qualifier
- WC = Wild card
- LL = Lucky loser
- Alt = Alternate
- ITF = ITF entry
- PR = Protected ranking
- SR = Special ranking
- SE = Special exempt
- JE = Junior exempt
- JR = Junior Accelerator Programme entrant
- CO = College Accelerator Programme entrant
- NG = Next Gen Accelerator Program entrant
- w/o = Walkover
- r = Retired
- d = Defaulted

=== Finals ===
Quarterfinals
1 | (United States) Andre Agassi | **6** | 2 | 3
8 | **(Germany) Rainer Schüttler** | 2 | **6** | **6**
**(Argentina) David Nalbandian** | **6** | **6**
(Spain) Feliciano López | 4 | 4
(Belarus) Max Mirnyi | 2 | 6^{3}
3 | **(Switzerland) Roger Federer** | **6** | **7^{7}**
6 | **(United States) Andy Roddick** | **7^{7}** | **6**
(Slovakia) Karol Kučera | 6^{5} | 3

Semifinals
8 | (Germany) Rainer Schüttler | **6** | 2 | 2
(Argentina) **David Nalbandian** | 3 | **6** | **6**
3 | (Switzerland) Roger Federer | 4 | **6** | 6^{3}
6 | (United States) **Andy Roddick** | **6** | 3 | **7^{7}**

Final
(Argentina) David Nalbandian | 1 | 3
6 | (United States) **Andy Roddick** | **6** | **6**

=== Top half ===
==== Section 1 ====
First round
1 | (United States) **A Agassi** | **6** | **6**
WC | (Canada) F Niemeyer | 4 | 2
(Russia) **N Davydenko** | **7^{7}** | 4 | **6**
WC | (Canada) F Dancevic | 6^{3} | **6** | 3
(France) F Santoro | **6** | 3 | 4
(Argentina) **J Acasuso** | 2 | **6** | **6**
WC | (Canada) **S Larose** | **7** | **7^{7}**
13 | (Brazil) G Kuerten | 5 | 6^{2}
10 | (Czech Republic) **J Novák** | **7** | 3 | **6**
(Croatia) M Ančić | 5 | **6** | 3
(Czech Republic) R Štěpánek | 6^{3} | 4
(United States) **J Blake** | **7^{7}** | **6**
(Russia) **Y Kafelnikov** | 1 | **6** | **6**
Q | (France) G Carraz | **6** | 2 | 4
(Russia) M Youzhny | 2 | 4
8 | (Germany) **R Schüttler** | **6** | **6**

Second round
1 | (United States) **A Agassi** | **7^{7}** | **6**
(Russia) N Davydenko | 6^{3} | 2
(Argentina) J Acasuso | 6^{5} | **6** | 5
WC | (Canada) **S Larose** | **7^{7}** | 1 | **7**
10 | (Czech Republic) **J Novák** | **7^{7}** | **6**
(United States) J Blake | 6^{5} | 3
(Russia) Y Kafelnikov | 1 | 4
8 | (Germany) **R Schüttler** | **6** | **6**

Third round
1 | (United States) **A Agassi** | **6** | **6**
(Canada) S Larose | 4 | 2
10 | (Czech Republic) J Novák | 5 | 0
8 | (Germany) **R Schüttler** | **7** | **6**

Quarterfinals
1 | (United States) A Agassi | **6** | 2 | 3
8 | (Germany) **R Schüttler** | 2 | **6** | **6**

==== Section 2 ====
First round
4 | (Spain) C Moyá | 6^{4} | **6** | 3
(France) **A Clément** | **7^{7}** | 4 | **6**
(United States) **V Spadea** | **6** | **6**
(Netherlands) R Sluiter | 3 | 4
(Finland) J Nieminen | 6^{5} | 6^{5}
(Argentina) **D Nalbandian** | **7^{7}** | **7^{7}**
(United Kingdom) **T Henman** | **6**
14 | (Chile) F González | 2 | r
12 | (Netherlands) S Schalken | 1 | 1
(Argentina) **M Zabaleta** | **6** | **6**
Q | (Slovakia) **K Beck** | 6^{6} | **7^{7}** | **6**
Q | (France) M Llodra | **7^{8}** | 6^{3} | 1
(France) **P-H Mathieu** | **7^{7}** | **6**
Q | (Australia) S Draper | 6^{5} | 4
(Spain) **F López** | **6**
7 | (Argentina) G Coria | 3 | r

Second round
(France) A Clément | 0 | **7^{7}** | 5
(United States) **V Spadea** | **6** | 6^{5} | **7**
(Argentina) **D Nalbandian** | **6** | **6**
(United Kingdom) T Henman | 4 | 4
(Argentina) M Zabaleta | 1 | 1
Q | (Slovakia) **K Beck** | **6** | **6**
(France) P-H Mathieu | 4 | **6** | 5
(Spain) **F López** | **6** | 3 | **7**

Third round
(United States) V Spadea | 4 | 2
(Argentina) **D Nalbandian** | **6** | **6**
Q | (Slovakia) K Beck | 4 | 6^{3}
(Spain) **F López** | **6** | **7^{7}**

Quarterfinals
(Argentina) **D Nalbandian** | **6** | **6**
(Spain) F López | 4 | 4

=== Bottom half ===
==== Section 3 ====
First round
5 | (Australia) **L Hewitt** | **6** | **6**
Q | (United States) B Bryan | 2 | 2
LL | (Chile) N Massú | 4 | 6^{4}
(Belarus) **M Mirnyi** | **6** | **7^{7}**
WC | (Canada) **D Nestor** | 3 | **6** | **6**
(United States) R Ginepri | **6** | 3 | 4
(Spain) A Martín | 0 | 6^{5}
11 | (Thailand) **P Srichaphan** | **6** | **7^{7}**
16 | (Spain) **T Robredo** | **6** | **7^{7}**
(South Korea) H-T Lee | 4 | 6^{0}
(South Africa) W Ferreira | 4 | 1^{r}
Q | (Zimbabwe) **W Black** | **6** | 2
(Ecuador) N Lapentti | 5 | 3
(United Kingdom) **G Rusedski** | **7** | **6**
(Argentina) G Gaudio | 4 | **6** | 5
3 | (Switzerland) **R Federer** | **6** | 3 | **7**

Second round
5 | (Australia) L Hewitt | 5 | **7^{7}** | 5
(Belarus) **M Mirnyi** | **7** | 6^{4} | **7**
WC | (Canada) D Nestor | 5 | 4
11 | (Thailand) **P Srichaphan** | **7** | **6**
16 | (Spain) **T Robredo** | **6** | **6**
Q | (Zimbabwe) W Black | 0 | 2
(United Kingdom) G Rusedski | 4 | 3
3 | (Switzerland) **R Federer** | **6** | **6**

Third round
(Belarus) **M Mirnyi** | **6** | **6**
11 | (Thailand) P Srichaphan | 3 | 2
16 | (Spain) T Robredo | 4 | 3
3 | (Switzerland) **R Federer** | **6** | **6**

Quarterfinals
(Belarus) M Mirnyi | 2 | 6^{3}
3 | (Switzerland) **R Federer** | **6** | **7^{7}**

==== Section 4 ====
First round
6 | (United States) **A Roddick** | 3 | **6** | **6**
(Belgium) X Malisse | **6** | 0 | 2
(Argentina) A Calleri | **7** | 4 | 3
(Argentina) **J I Chela** | 5 | **6** | **6**
Q | (Paraguay) **R Delgado** | **7^{7}** | **7^{7}**
(Croatia) I Ljubičić | 6^{0} | 6^{3}
(Spain) F Vicente | 3 | 3
9 | (France) **S Grosjean** | **6** | **6**
15 | (Netherlands) **M Verkerk** | **6** | 4 | **7**
(Armenia) S Sargsian | 2 | **6** | 5
(Slovakia) **K Kučera** | **7^{7}** | **7^{7}**
(United States) J-M Gambill | 6^{3} | 6^{3}
(Morocco) **Y El Aynaoui** | **6** | 6^{8} | **6**
(United States) M Fish | 3 | **7^{10}** | 3
Q | (France) C Saulnier | 4 | 4
2 | (Spain) **J C Ferrero** | **6** | **6**

Second round
6 | (United States) **A Roddick** | **7^{8}** | **6**
(Argentina) J I Chela | 6^{6} | 2
Q | (Paraguay) R Delgado | 3 | 2
9 | (France) **S Grosjean** | **6** | **6**
15 | (Netherlands) M Verkerk | 6^{8} | 6^{3}
(Slovakia) **K Kučera** | **7^{10}** | **7^{7}**
(Morocco) Y El Aynaoui | 3 | 4
2 | (Spain) **J C Ferrero** | **6** | **6**

Third round
6 | (United States) **A Roddick** | **6** | **6**
9 | (France) S Grosjean | 3 | 3
(Slovakia) **K Kučera** | **6** | **7**
2 | (Spain) J C Ferrero | 3 | 5

Quarterfinals
6 | (United States) **A Roddick** | **7^{7}** | **6**
(Slovakia) K Kučera | 6^{5} | 3

== Qualifying ==
=== Qualifying seeds ===
1. (Chile) Nicolás Massú (qualifying competition, **lucky loser**)
2. (Sweden) Jonas Björkman (qualifying competition)
3. (Morocco) Hicham Arazi (qualifying competition)
4. (Slovakia) **Karol Beck (qualified)**
5. (Australia) Wayne Arthurs (first round)
6. (United States) Todd Martin (first round)
7. (France) **Grégory Carraz (qualified)**
8. (France) **Cyril Saulnier (qualified)**
9. (Australia) **Scott Draper (qualified)**
10. (South Africa) Wesley Moodie (first round)
11. (Sweden) Thomas Enqvist (qualifying competition)
12. (Switzerland) Ivo Heuberger (first round)
13. (Czech Republic) Jiří Vaněk (qualifying competition)
14. (Australia) Peter Luczak (qualifying competition)
15. (n/a)
16. (Israel) Harel Levy (qualifying competition)

=== Qualifiers ===
1. (Zimbabwe) **Wayne Black**
2. (United States) **Bob Bryan**
3. (Australia) **Scott Draper**
4. (Slovakia) **Karol Beck**
5. (Paraguay) **Ramón Delgado**
6. (France) **Michaël Llodra**
7. (France) **Grégory Carraz**
8. (France) **Cyril Saulnier**

=== Lucky loser ===
1. (Chile) **Nicolás Massú**

=== Qualifying draw ===
==== First qualifier ====
First round
1 | **(Chile) Nicolás Massú** | 6^{6} | **6** | **6**
WC | (Canada) Philip Gubenco | **7^{8}** | 2 | 3
(Israel) Noam Okun | 4 | 2
Alt | **(Zimbabwe) Wayne Black** | **6** | **6**

Qualifying competition
1 | (Chile) Nicolás Massú | 2 | 4
Alt | **(Zimbabwe) Wayne Black** | **6** | **6**

==== Second qualifier ====
First round
2 | **(Sweden) Jonas Björkman** | **7^{7}** | **6**
(United States) Andres Pedroso | 6^{0} | 4
**(United States) Bob Bryan** | **6** | **6**
10 | (South Africa) Wesley Moodie | 3 | 3

Qualifying competition
2 | (Sweden) Jonas Björkman | 4 | 6^{4}
**(United States) Bob Bryan** | **6** | **7^{7}**

==== Third qualifier ====
First round
3 | **(Morocco) Hicham Arazi** | **6** | **6**
(Argentina) Nicolás Todero | 4 | 4
(Australia) Jaymon Crabb | 1 | 6^{4}
9 | **(Australia) Scott Draper** | **6** | **7^{7}**

Qualifying competition
3 | (Morocco) Hicham Arazi | **6** | 4 | 3
9 | **(Australia) Scott Draper** | 4 | **6** | **6**

==== Fourth qualifier ====
First round
4 | **(Slovakia) Karol Beck** | **6** | **6**
WC | (Canada) Sanjin Sadovich | 1 | 3
(Serbia and Montenegro) Nenad Zimonjić | 2 | 3
11 | **(Sweden) Thomas Enqvist** | **6** | **6**

Qualifying competition
4 | **(Slovakia) Karol Beck** | **6** | **6**
11 | (Sweden) Thomas Enqvist | 3 | 2

==== Fifth qualifier ====
First round
5 | (Australia) Wayne Arthurs | 6^{2} | **6** | 6^{5}
**(Paraguay) Ramón Delgado** | **7^{7}** | 3 | **7^{7}**
(United States) Glenn Weiner | 4 | **7^{7}** | 3
14 | **(Australia) Peter Luczak** | **6** | 6^{5} | **6**

Qualifying competition
**(Paraguay) Ramón Delgado** | **6** | **7^{7}**
14 | (Australia) Peter Luczak | 2 | 6^{5}

==== Sixth qualifier ====
First round
6 | (United States) Todd Martin | 3 | 4
**(France) Michaël Llodra** | **6** | **6**
WC | **(Canada) Matt Klinger** | **6** | 3 | **6**
12 | (Switzerland) Ivo Heuberger | 4 | **6** | 3

Qualifying competition
**(France) Michaël Llodra** | **7^{7}** | **6**
WC | (Canada) Matt Klinger | 6^{5} | 3

==== Seventh qualifier ====
First round
7 | **(France) Grégory Carraz** | **6** | **6**
(Argentina) Gastón Etlis | 4 | 4
(United States) Michael Joyce | 4 | 2
16 | **(Israel) Harel Levy** | **6** | **6**

Qualifying competition
7 | **(France) Grégory Carraz** | **7** | **6**
16 | (Israel) Harel Levy | 5 | 2

==== Eighth qualifier ====
First round
8 | **(France) Cyril Saulnier** | **6** | **6**
(Israel) Amir Hadad | 2 | 3
WC | (Canada) Dejan Cvetkovic | **7^{7}** | 5 | 1
13 | **(Czech Republic) Jiří Vaněk** | 6^{1} | **7** | **6**

Qualifying competition
8 | **(France) Cyril Saulnier** | **6** | **6**
13 | (Czech Republic) Jiří Vaněk | 1 | 2
