= Natallia Dziamidzenka =

Belarusian tennis player

Natallia Dziamidzenka Наталля Дзямідзенка
- Country (sports): Belarus
- Born: 9 November 1983 (age 41); Minsk, Soviet Union
- Turned pro: 2000
- Retired: 2006
- Prize money: $28,976

Singles
- Career record: 77–92
- Career titles: 0
- Highest ranking: No. 340 (4 October 2004)

Doubles
- Career record: 58–61
- Career titles: 2 ITF
- Highest ranking: No. 228 (11 October 2004)

Natallia Dziamidzenka (Belarusian: Наталля Дзямідзенка; born 9 November 1983) is a retired Belarusian tennis player.

She won two doubles titles on the ITF Circuit in her career. On 4 October 2004, she reached her best singles ranking of world No. 340. On 11 October 2004, she peaked at No. 228 in the doubles rankings.

Partnering Anda Perianu, Dziamidzenka won her first $50k tournament in July 2005 at the ITF Louisville, defeating Teryn Ashley and Julie Ditty in the final.

== ITF finals ==
$50,000 tournaments
$25,000 tournaments
$10,000 tournaments

=== Singles: 1 (0–1) ===
Result	W–L	Date	Tournament	Tier	Surface	Opponent	Score
Loss	0–1	June 2004	ITF Hilton Head, United States	10,000	Hard	(Canada) Mélanie Marois	4–6, 7–5, 4–6

=== Doubles: 9 (2–7) ===
Result	W–L	Date	Tournament	Tier	Surface	Partner	Opponents	Score
Loss	0–1	September 2001	ITF Pétange, Luxembourg	10,000	Clay	(Netherlands) Kika Hogendoorn	(Belgium) Elke Clijsters (Australia) Jaslyn Hewitt	1–6, 3–6
Loss	0–2	July 2002	ITF Baltimore, United States	10,000	Hard	(South Korea) Kim Jin-hee	(Puerto Rico) Vilmarie Castellvi (United States) Agnes Wiski	1–6, 6–3, 3–6
Loss	0–3	February 2003	ITF Bangalore, India	10,000	Hard	(Japan) Maki Arai	(India) Rushmi Chakravarthi (India) Sai Jayalakshmy Jayaram	6–7^{(5)}, 6–7^{(4)}
Loss	0–4	February 2004	ITF Boca Raton, United States	10,000	Hard	(India) Sania Mirza	(United States) Allison Bradshaw (United States) Julie Ditty	3–6, 1–6
Loss	0–5	July 2004	ITF College Park, United States	25,000	Hard	(United States) Kaysie Smashey	(Japan) Shiho Hisamatsu (Japan) Seiko Okamoto	6–7^{(5)}, 2–6
Loss	0–6	September 2004	ITF Tunica, United States	25,000	Clay	(Latvia) Līga Dekmeijere	(United States) Tetiana Luzhanska (Canada) Aneta Soukup	2–6, 1–6
Win	1–6	October 2004	ITF Pelham, United States	25,000	Clay	(Latvia) Līga Dekmeijere	(United States) Sarah Riske (United States) Aleke Tsoubanos	6–3, 6–1
Loss	1–7	January 2005	ITF Clearwater, United States	10,000	Hard	(Russia) Anna Bastrikova	(United States) Lauren Fisher (United States) Amanda Johnson	6–4, 4–6, 3–6
Win	2–7	July 2005	ITF Louisville, United States	50,000	Hard	(Romania) Anda Perianu	(United States) Teryn Ashley (United States) Julie Ditty	7–5, 2–6, 6–4
