= Sandra Klösel =

German tennis player

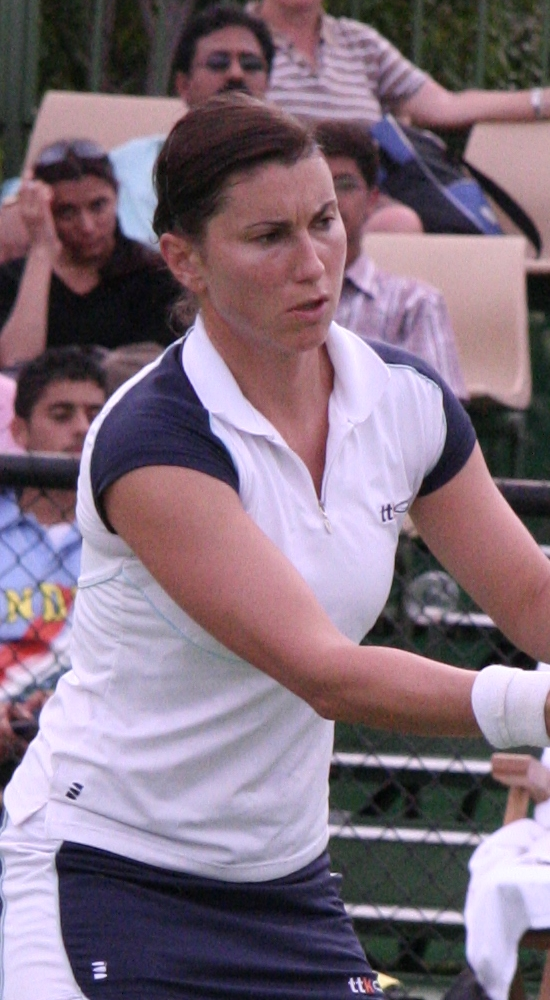
- ITF name: Sandra Kloesel
- Country (sports): Germany
- Residence: Baden-Württemberg, Germany
- Born: 22 June 1979 (age 46); Oberkirch, West Germany
- Height: 1.73 m (5 ft 8 in)
- Turned pro: 1995
- Retired: 2009
- Plays: Right-handed (two-handed backhand)
- Prize money: $653,396

Singles
- Career record: 354–291
- Career titles: 9 ITF
- Highest ranking: No. 87 (19 March 2007)

Grand Slam singles results
- Australian Open: 2R (2008)
- French Open: 2R (2005)
- Wimbledon: 1R (2006, 2007)
- US Open: 3R (1999)

Doubles
- Career record: 81–101
- Career titles: 6 ITF
- Highest ranking: No. 128 (1 October 2007)

Grand Slam doubles results
- Australian Open: 1R (1998, 2006, 2007)
- French Open: 1R (2007)
- Wimbledon: 2R (2007)

Team competitions
- Fed Cup: 1–2

Sandra Klösel (born 22 June 1979) is a former tennis player from Germany.

Kösel turned professional in July 1995, and won nine singles and six doubles titles on the ITF Circuit. In March 2007, she reached her career-high singles ranking of world No. 87. On 1 October 2007, she peaked at No. 128 in the doubles rankings.

== ITF Circuit finals ==
Legend
$100,000 tournaments
$75,000 tournaments
$50,000 tournaments
$25,000 tournaments
$10,000 tournaments

=== Singles: 20 (9–11) ===
Result	No.	Date	Tournament	Surface	Opponent	Score
Loss	1.	22 May 1995	ITF Ratzeburg, Germany	Clay	(Germany) Claudia Timm	6–7^{(5–7)}, 6–7^{(5–7)}
Win	1.	7 July 1996	ITF Stuttgart, Germany	Clay	(Portugal) Sofia Prazeres	2–6, 7–6, 6–3
Loss	2.	14 July 1996	ITF Puchheim, Germany	Clay	(Czech Republic) Denisa Chládková	3–6, 7–5, 6–7
Win	2.	29 July 1996	ITF Rostock, Germany	Clay	(Czech Republic) Lenka Němečková	6–2, 7–6
Loss	3.	6 July 1997	ITF Stuttgart, Germany	Clay	(Spain) Ana Alcázar	3–6, 4–6
Win	3.	10 August 1997	ITF Carthage, Tunisia	Clay	(Germany) Maja Živec-Škulj	3–6, 7–5, 6–0
Loss	4.	28 September 1997	ITF Bucharest, Romania	Clay	(Netherlands) Amanda Hopmans	6–4, 2–6, 5–7
Loss	5.	5 July 1998	ITF Stuttgart, Germany	Clay	(Slovakia) Ľudmila Cervanová	2–6, 5–7
Win	4.	15 July 2001	Getxo, Spain	Clay	(Brazil) Maria Fernanda Alves	6–3, 6–2
Win	5.	3 February 2002	Belfort, France	Hard (i)	(France) Olivia Sanchez	6–4, 6–4
Win	6.	24 March 2002	Cholet, France	Clay (i)	(Belgium) Patty Van Acker	6–7^{(2–7)}, 6–4, 6–4
Win	7.	2 April 2002	Taranto, Italy	Clay	(Hungary) Virág Németh	6–4, 1–6, 6–4
Win	8.	14 July 2002	Darmstadt, Germany	Clay	(Slovakia) Zuzana Kučová	6–4, 7–6^{(7–3)}
Win	9.	11 August 2002	Hechingen, Germany	Clay	(Argentina) Natalia Gussoni	6–3, 6–0
Loss	6.	21 November 2004	Průhonice, Czech Republic	Hard (i)	(Czech Republic) Michaela Paštiková	3–6, 2–6
Loss	7.	6 February 2005	Ortisei, Italy	Carpet (i)	(Netherlands) Michaëlla Krajicek	3–6, 3–6
Loss	8.	10 September 2006	Mestre, Italy	Clay	(Croatia) Sanja Ančić	1–6, 2–6
Loss	9.	17 September 2006	Bordeaux, France	Clay	(Germany) Martina Müller	3–6, 2–6
Loss	10.	27 January 2008	Waikoloa, United States	Hard	(Japan) Rika Fujiwara	6–3, 3–6, 2–6
Loss	11.	3 February 2008	ITF La Quinta, United States	Hard	(Kazakhstan) Sesil Karatantcheva	4–6, 5–7

=== Doubles: 12 (6–6) ===
Result	No	Date	Tournament	Surface	Partner	Opponents	Score
Loss	1.	16 October 1995	ITF Flensburg, Germany	Carpet (i)	(France) Amélie Mauresmo	(United Kingdom) Yvette Basting (Ukraine) Elena Tatarkova	4–6, 6–2, 2–6
Win	1.	20 September 1997	Sofia, Bulgaria	Clay	(Austria) Karin Kschwendt	(Federal Republic of Yugoslavia) Sandra Načuk (Federal Republic of Yugoslavia) Dragana Zarić	6–4, 6–4
Loss	2.	18 September 1998	Bordeaux, France	Clay	(Netherlands) Amanda Hopmans	(Hungary) Anna Földényi (Hungary) Rita Kuti-Kis	2–6, 3–6
Loss	3.	3 November 2001	Stockholm, Sweden	Hard (i)	(Germany) Claudia Kuleszka	(Germany) Susi Bensch (Germany) Sabrina Jolk	3–6, 4–6
Loss	4.	16 June 2002	Marseille, France	Clay	(Germany) Vanessa Henke	(Spain) Lourdes Domínguez Lino (Spain) Conchita Martínez Granados	5–7, 6–4, 0–6
Win	2.	18 September 2004	Ashland, United States	Hard	(Argentina) María Emilia Salerni	(United States) Cory Ann Avants (United States) Kristen Schlukebir	6–3, 6–3
Win	3.	26 February 2005	Saint Paul, United States	Hard (i)	(Ukraine) Yuliya Beygelzimer	(Canada) Mélanie Marois (United States) Sarah Riske	6–2, 6–1
Loss	5.	10 April 2005	Dinan, France	Clay (i)	(Ukraine) Yuliya Beygelzimer	(Netherlands) Michaëlla Krajicek (Hungary) Ágnes Szávay	5–7, 5–7
Win	4.	1 May 2005	Cagnes-sur-Mer, France	Clay	(Ukraine) Yuliya Beygelzimer	(France) Caroline Dhenin (Romania) Andreea Ehritt-Vanc	6–3, 3–6, 6–1
Win	5.	24 July 2005	Pétange, Luxembourg	Clay	(Ukraine) Yuliya Beygelzimer	(United Kingdom) Claire Curran (Netherlands) Kim Kilsdonk	6–4, 6–0
Win	6.	10 September 2007	ITF Bordeaux, France	Clay	(Switzerland) Timea Bacsinszky	(Russia) Alisa Kleybanova (Italy) Nathalie Viérin	7–6^{(7–2)}, 6–4
Loss	6.	29 September 2007	ITF Ashland, United States	Hard	(Estonia) Maret Ani	(Brazil) Maria Fernanda Alves (Czech Republic) Eva Hrdinová	6–7^{(5–7)}, 2–6
