= Kristen Schlukebir =

American tennis player

- Country (sports): United States
- Born: June 28, 1984 (age 41) Kalamazoo, Michigan, U.S.
- Plays: Right-handed
- Prize money: $94,748

Singles
- Career record: 117–115
- Highest ranking: No. 208 (August 9, 2004)

Grand Slam singles results
- US Open: 1R (2000)

Doubles
- Career record: 106–88
- Career titles: 5 ITF
- Highest ranking: No. 143 (June 20, 2005)

Grand Slam doubles results
- US Open: 1R (2000, 2002)

Kristen Schlukebir (born June 28, 1984) was the number one ranked junior in the United States between the ages of 15-18. At 15, she won the USTA 18 & Under National Hardcourts in both singles and doubles granting her a wildcard into the main draw of the US Open. Kristen turned professional at age 18 and played on the Women's Tennis Association tour for over two years, reaching a career high in singles of No. 161.

Kristen had two older sisters, Karie and Katie both who played tennis. Katie attended Stanford University and played on the tennis team. Karie attended Indiana University on a tennis scholarship but died in 2010 from melanoma.

== ITF finals ==
=== Singles (0–3) ===
| Result | No. | Date | Tournament | Surface | Opponent | Score |
|---|---|---|---|---|---|---|
| Loss | 1. | 21 July 2001 | Evansville, United States | Hard | (South Africa) Chanelle Scheepers | 1–6, 3–6 |
| Loss | 2. | 5 October 2003 | Greenville, United States | Clay | (Romania) Edina Gallovits-Hall | 0–6, 4–6 |
| Loss | 3. | 18 January 2004 | Tampa, United States | Hard | (China) Liu Nannan | 3–6, 1–6 |

=== Doubles (5–10) ===
| Result | No. | Date | Tournament | Surface | Partner | Opponents | Score |
|---|---|---|---|---|---|---|---|
| Win | 1. | 5 February 2001 | Rockford, United States | Hard (i) | (United States) Katie Schlukebir | (Bulgaria) Svetlana Krivencheva (Ukraine) Elena Tatarkova | 7–6^{(4)}, 6–1 |
| Win | 2. | 24 February 2002 | Columbus, United States | Hard | (United States) Teryn Ashley | (Russia) Maria Goloviznina (Russia) Eugenia Kulikovskaya | 4–6, 6–4, 6–2 |
| Loss | 3. | 31 March 2002 | Lawrenceville, United States | Hard | (United States) Teryn Ashley | (Japan) Akiko Morigami (Japan) Saori Obata | 5–7, 6–7^{(2)} |
| Loss | 4. | 19 May 2002 | Charlottesville, United States | Clay | (United States) Teryn Ashley | (United States) Erika deLone (South Africa) Jessica Steck | 2–6, 6–2, 5–7 |
| Loss | 5. | 16 June 2002 | Allentown, United States | Hard | (United States) Tanner Cochran | (United States) Jennifer Russell (United States) Jessica Lehnhoff | 4–6, 7–6^{(4)}, 6–7^{(4)} |
| Loss | 6. | 5 October 2003 | Greenville, United States | Clay | (United States) Kelly McCain | (Brazil) Bruna Colósio (Brazil) Joana Cortez | 2–6, 5–7 |
| Loss | 7. | 18 April 2004 | Jackson, United States | Clay | (United States) Cory Ann Avants | (Canada) Stéphanie Dubois (Russia) Alisa Kleybanova | 2–6, 3–6 |
| Loss | 8. | 19 September 2004 | Ashland, United States | Hard | (United States) Cory Ann Avants | (Germany) Sandra Klösel (Argentina) María Emilia Salerni | 3–6, 3–6 |
| Win | 9. | 10 October 2004 | Lafayette, United States | Clay | (United States) Julie Ditty | (South Africa) Natalie Grandin (United States) Arpi Kojian | 6–2, 7–5 |
| Win | 10. | 17 October 2004 | Ashburn, United States | Hard | (United States) Kelly McCain | (Romania) Ruxandra Dragomir (United States) Samantha Reeves | 6–2, 6–2 |
| Loss | 11. | 16 January 2005 | Tampa, United States | Hard | (United States) Cory Ann Avants | (United States) Julie Ditty (Czech Republic) Vladimíra Uhlířová | 1–6, 2–6 |
| Win | 12. | 12 April 2005 | Jackson, United States | Clay | (Australia) Anastasia Rodionova | (United States) Ahsha Rolle (Venezuela) Milagros Sequera | 6–1, 3–6, 6–2 |
| Loss | 13. | 12 June 2005 | Allentown, United States | Hard | (United States) Cory Ann Avants | (United States) Ansley Cargill (United States) Julie Ditty | 2–6, 3–6 |
| Loss | 14. | 2 October 2005 | Pelham, United States | Clay | (United States) Raquel Atawo | (Slovakia) Kristína Michalaková (United States) Tetiana Luzhanska | 6–7^{(2)}, 4–6 |
| Loss | 15. | 13 November 2005 | Toronto Challenger, Canada | Hard (i) | (United States) Lauren Barnikow | (Ukraine) Olena Antypina (Germany) Martina Müller | 3–6, 1–6 |
