= Tetiana Luzhanska =

Ukrainian-American tennis player

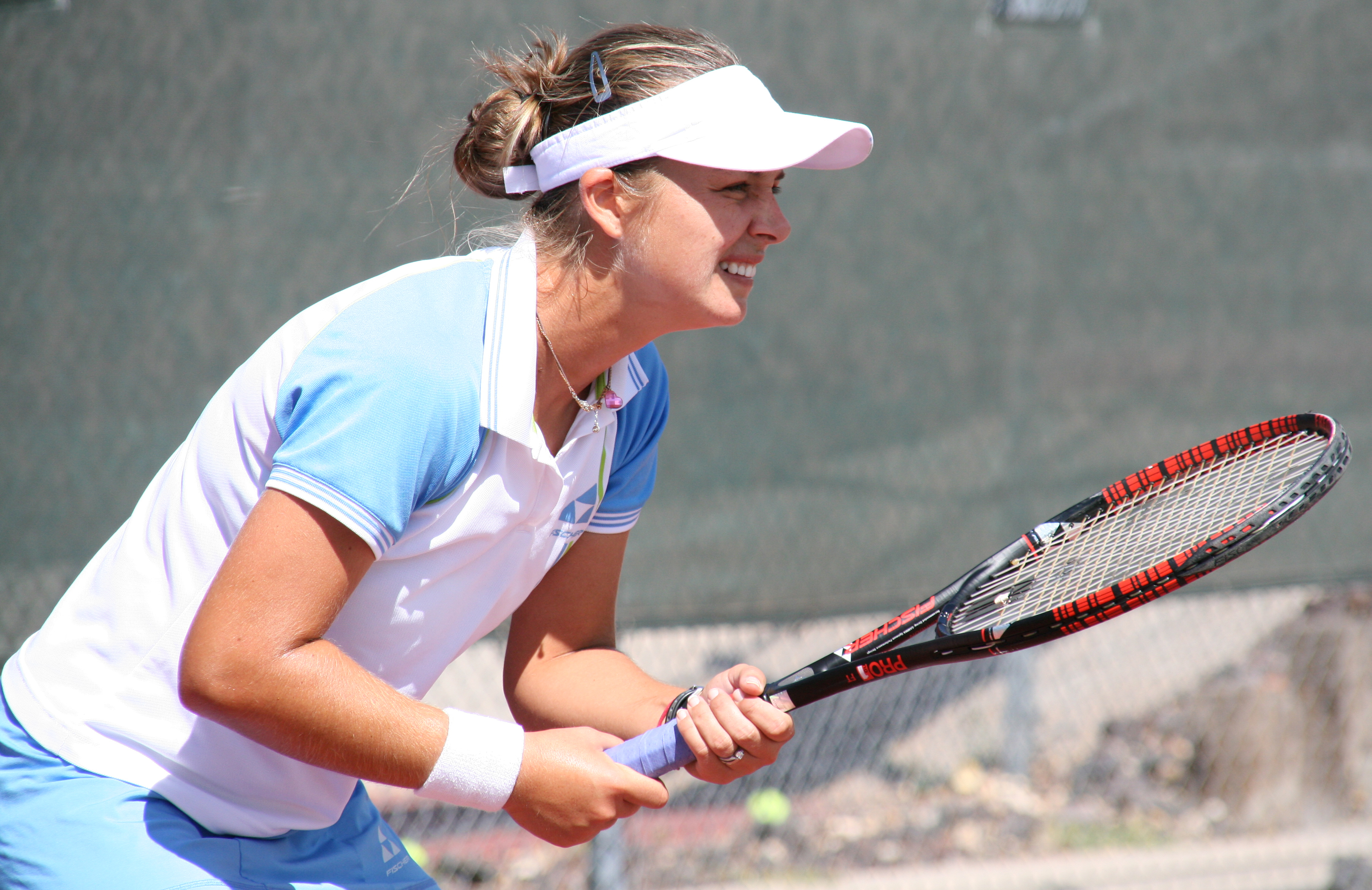
- Native name: Тетяна Лужанська
- Country (sports): Ukraine (2006–2011); United States (2012–2013)
- Residence: Bradenton, Florida, U.S.
- Born: September 4, 1984 (age 41) Kiev, Ukrainian SSR, Soviet Union (now Kyiv, Ukraine)
- Turned pro: 2006
- Retired: 2013
- Plays: Right (two-handed backhand)
- Prize money: $240,381

Singles
- Career record: 240–210
- Career titles: 2 ITF
- Highest ranking: No. 131 (26 September 2011)

Grand Slam singles results
- Australian Open: Q1 (2012)
- French Open: Q3 (2008)
- Wimbledon: Q3 (2011)
- US Open: Q3 (2010)

Doubles
- Career record: 206–134
- Career titles: 20 ITF
- Highest ranking: No. 99 (12 February 2007)

Grand Slam doubles results
- Wimbledon: Q1 (2007)

Tetiana Luzhanska (Note: Ukrainian: Тетяна Лужанська, romanized: Tetiana Luzhanska) (born September 4, 1984) is a former tennis player. Luzhanska has a career-high singles ranking of world No. 131, achieved on 26 September 2011, and a highest WTA doubles ranking of 99, set on 12 February 2007. In her career, she won two singles titles and twenty doubles titles at tournaments of the ITF Women's Circuit.

== Career ==
Luzhanska won singles titles at $25k tournaments in Monterrey and Saltillo, Mexico. During the 2007 season, she won six doubles titles at $25k tournaments on the ITF Circuit.

In August 2007, Luzhanska and Chan Chin-wei reached the doubles final at the WTA Tier IV event Nordic Light Open in Stockholm, losing to Anabel Medina Garrigues and Virginia Ruano Pascual, in a close three-setter.

Luzhanska retired from professional tennis in 2013.

== WTA Tour finals ==
=== Doubles: 1 (runner-up) ===
Legend
Tier III, IV & V (0–1)

Result	Date	Tournament	Surface	Partner	Opponents	Score
Loss	Aug 2007	Nordic Light Open, Sweden	Hard	(Chinese Taipei) Chan Chin-wei	(Spain) Anabel Medina Garrigues (Spain) Virginia Ruano Pascual	1–6, 7–5, [6–10]

== ITF Circuit finals ==
=== Singles: 7 (2 titles, 5 runner-ups) ===
Legend $50,000 tournaments $25,000 tournaments $10,000 tournaments	Finals by surface Hard (2–4) Clay (0–1)

Result	No.	Date	Tournament	Surface	Opponent	Score
Loss	1.	Oct 2000	ITF Ashkelon, Israel	Hard	(Israel) Tzipora Obziler	1–4, 3–1, 1–4, 1–4
Win	1.	Oct 2007	ITF Monterrey, Mexico	Hard	(Argentina) María Irigoyen	6–3, 6–2
Win	2.	Oct 2007	ITF Saltillo, Mexico	Hard	(Argentina) María José Argeri	6–3, 7–5
Loss	2.	Apr 2008	ITF Jackson, United States	Clay	(Argentina) Soledad Esperón	7–6, 2–6, 1–6
Loss	3.	Oct 2008	ITF Augusta, United States	Hard	(Indonesia) Sandy Gumulya	0–6, 6–7
Loss	4.	Jan 2011	ITF Pingguo, China	Hard	(China) Lu Jingjing	4–6, 5–7
Loss	5.	Jun 2011	ITF Boston, United States	Hard	(Slovenia) Petra Rampre	4–6, 7–5, 4–6

=== Doubles: 36 (20 titles, 16 runner-ups) ===
Legend $100,000 tournaments $75,000 tournaments $50,000 tournaments $25,000 tournaments $10,000 tournaments	Finals by surface Hard (15–14) Clay (5–2)

Result	No.	Date	Tournament	Surface	Partner	Opponents	Score
Loss	1.	Aug 2000	ITF Istanbul, Turkey	Hard	(Israel) Yael Glitzenshtein	(Germany) Susi Bensch (Switzerland) Lucia Tallo	2–6, 4–6
Loss	2.	Oct 2000	ITF Ashkelon, Israel	Hard	(Israel) Yael Glitzenshtein	(Netherlands) Linda Akkerman (Netherlands) Anouk Sinnige	1–4, 4–5^{(7)}, 2–4
Win	1.	Aug 2001	ITF Harrisonburg, United States	Hard	(South Africa) Lara Van Rooyen	(Canada) Aneta Soukup (Latvia) Anžela Žguna	7–5, 3–6, 6–2
Loss	3.	Jun 2004	ITF Inyo County, United States	Hard	(Colombia) Paula Zabala	(United States) Tamara Encina (United States) Alison Ojeda	3–6, 3–6
Win	2.	Sep 2004	ITF Tunica, United States	Clay	(Canada) Aneta Soukup	(Latvia) Lïga Dekmeijere (Belarus) Natallia Dziamidzenka	6–2, 6–1
Win	3.	Oct 2005	ITF Pelham, United States	Clay	(Slovakia) Kristína Michalaková	(United States) Raquel Kops-Jones (United States) Kristen Schlukebir	7–6^{(2)}, 6–4
Win	4.	Apr 2006	ITF Hammond, United States	Hard	(Chinese Taipei) Chan Chin-wei	(Uzbekistan) Akgul Amanmuradova (Indonesia) Romana Tedjakusuma	6–1, 6–3
Win	5.	Apr 2006	ITF Pelham, United States	Clay	(Indonesia) Romana Tedjakusuma	(United States) Tiffany Dabek (South Africa) Chanelle Scheepers	6–4, 6–1
Win	6.	Jun 2006	ITF Allentown, United States	Hard	(United States) Carly Gullickson	(United States) Julie Ditty (United States) Ansley Cargill	6–3, 6–4
Win	7.	Aug 2006	ITF Washington, United States	Hard	(Chinese Taipei) Chan Chin-wei	(Uzbekistan) Akgul Amanmuradova (United States) Varvara Lepchenko	6–2, 1–6, 6–0
Win	8.	Oct 2006	ITF Houston, United States	Hard	(United States) Julie Ditty	(United States) Laura Granville (United States) Carly Gullickson	6–4, 4–6, 7–5
Win	9.	Jan 2007	ITF Tampa, United States	Hard	(Germany) Angelika Bachmann	(Czech Republic) Andrea Hlaváčková (Czech Republic) Olga Blahotová	7–5, 6–2
Win	10.	Jan 2007	ITF Fort Walton Beach, United States	Hard	(Germany) Angelika Bachmann	(Canada) Marie-Ève Pelletier (United States) Sunitha Rao	7–5, 6–7^{(7)}, 7–6^{(4)}
Loss	4.	Mar 2007	ITF Orange, United States	Hard	(Chinese Taipei) Chan Chin-wei	(Argentina) Jorgelina Cravero (Chinese Taipei) Hsieh Su-wei	3–6, 1–6
Win	11.	Apr 2007	ITF Hammond, United States	Hard	(Chinese Taipei) Chan Chin-wei	(Serbia) Teodora Mirčić (Canada) Marie-Ève Pelletier	6–1, 7–6^{(3)}
Win	12.	May 2007	ITF Incheon, South Korea	Hard	(Indonesia) Romana Tedjakusuma	(South Korea) Lee Jin-a (South Korea) Yoo Mi	6–1, 6–4
Loss	5.	May 2007	ITF Gimcheon, South Korea	Hard	(Indonesia) Romana Tedjakusuma	(Chinese Taipei) Chan Chin-wei (Chinese Taipei) Hsieh Su-wei	5–7, 4–6
Win	13.	Jul 2007	ITF Istanbul, Turkey	Hard	(Australia) Monique Adamczak	(Slovakia) Stanislava Hrozenská (Russia) Maria Kondratieva	6–4, 6–4
Win	14.	Jul 2007	ITF Rome, Italy	Clay	(Chinese Taipei) Chan Chin-wei	(Ukraine) Irina Buryachok (Austria) Patricia Mayr-Achleitner	7–6^{(7)}, 6–4
Loss	6.	Jan 2008	ITF La Quinta, United States	Hard	(Germany) Angelika Bachmann	(United States) Carly Gullickson (United States) Shenay Perry	1–6, 4–6
Loss	7.	Mar 2008	Las Vegas Open, United States	Hard	(Chinese Taipei) Chan Chin-wei	(Hungary) Melinda Czink (Czech Republic) Renata Voráčová	3–6, 2–6
Loss	8.	Mar 2008	ITF Redding, United States	Hard	(Chinese Taipei) Chan Chin-wei	(United States) Angela Haynes (United States) Abigail Spears	4–6, 3–6
Win	15.	Apr 2008	Dothan Pro Classic, United States	Clay	(Czech Republic) Michaela Paštiková	(Brazil) Maria Fernanda Alves (Canada) Stéphanie Dubois	6–1, 6–3
Loss	9.	Mar 2009	ITF Hammond, United States	Hard	(Chinese Taipei) Chan Chin-wei	(South Africa) Surina De Beer (United States) Lilia Osterloh	4–6, 3–6
Loss	10.	May 2009	ITF Indian Harbour Beach, United States	Clay	(United States) Lilia Osterloh	(Canada) Heidi El Tabakh (Austria) Melanie Klaffner	3–6, 6–3, [7–10]
Loss	11.	Jun 2009	ITF El Paso, United States	Hard	(Brazil) Maria Fernanda Alves	(United States) Christina Fusano (India) Shikha Uberoi	3–6, 5–7
Loss	12.	Jun 2009	Waterloo Challenger, Canada	Clay	(Canada) Heidi El Tabakh	(United States) Alexandra Mueller (United States) Allie Will	2–6, 1–6
Win	16.	Jul 2009	Lexington Challenger, United States	Hard	(Chinese Taipei) Chang Kai-chen	(United States) Jacqueline Cako (United States) Alison Riske	6–3, 6–2
Win	17.	Jun 2010	ITF Boston, United States	Hard	(United States) Kimberly Couts	(United States) Lindsay Lee-Waters (United States) Megan Moulton-Levy	6–4, 3–6, [10–8]
Loss	13.	Jul 2010	ITF Grapevine, United States	Hard	(United States) Kimberly Couts	(United States) Lindsay Lee-Waters (United States) Megan Moulton-Levy	2–6, 5–7
Win	18.	Nov 2010	Phoenix Classic, United States	Hard	(United States) CoCo Vandeweghe	(United States) Julia Boserup (United States) Sloane Stephens	7–5, 6–4
Loss	14.	Feb 2011	ITF Surprise, United States	Hard	(Bosnia and Herzegovina) Mervana Jugić-Salkić	(Japan) Remi Tezuka (Japan) Shuko Aoyama	3–6, 1–6
Win	19.	Jun 2011	ITF Boston, United States	Hard	(United States) Alexandra Mueller	(Canada) Sharon Fichman (Canada) Marie-Ève Pelletier	7–6^{(3)}, 6–3
Loss	15.	Sep 2011	Beijing Challenger, China	Hard	(China) Zheng Saisai	(Chinese Taipei) Chan Hao-ching (Chinese Taipei) Chan Yung-jan	2–6, 3–6
Win	20.	Sep 2011	Ningbo International, China	Hard	(China) Zheng Saisai	(Chinese Taipei) Chan Chin-wei (China) Han Xinyun	6–4, 5–7, [10–4]
Loss	16.	Sep 2012	Ningbo International, China	Hard	(China) Zheng Saisai	(Japan) Shuko Aoyama (Chinese Taipei) Chang Kai-chen	2–6, 5–7
