= Julie Ditty =

American tennis player (1979–2021)

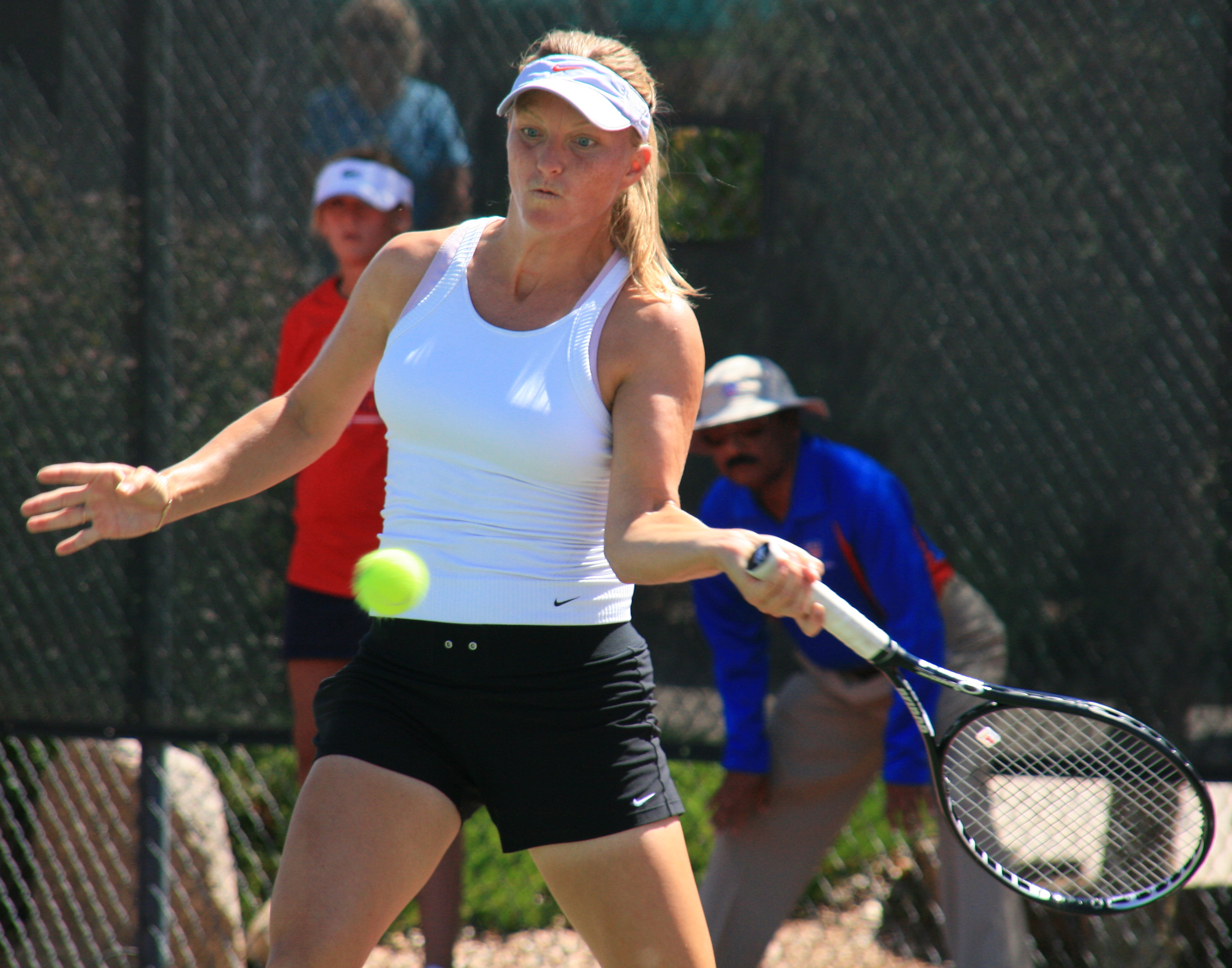
- Ditty at a $75k event in Albuquerque (2008)
- Country (sports): United States
- Born: January 4, 1979 Atlanta, Georgia, U.S.
- Died: August 31, 2021 (aged 42) Ashland, Kentucky, U.S.
- Height: 1.68 m (5 ft 6 in)
- Turned pro: 2002
- Retired: 2012
- Plays: Left-handed (two-handed backhand)
- Prize money: $493,612

Singles
- Career record: 294–231
- Career titles: 9 ITF
- Highest ranking: No. 89 (March 24, 2008)

Grand Slam singles results
- Australian Open: 1R (2008)
- French Open: 1R (2008)
- Wimbledon: 1R (2008)
- US Open: Q3 (2007)

Doubles
- Career record: 296–168
- Career titles: 30 ITF
- Highest ranking: No. 66 (August 3, 2009)

Grand Slam doubles results
- Australian Open: 1R (2009)
- French Open: 2R (2009)
- Wimbledon: 2R (2009)
- US Open: 3R (2008)

Julie Ditty Qualls (January 4, 1979 – August 31, 2021) was an American professional tennis player.

She had her WTA Tour breakthrough when she reached the semifinals of the Bell Challenge. It took her into the top 100 for the first time in her career, on November 5, 2007, at No. 91. She beat Alizé Cornet and Vania King before falling to Julia Vakulenko in three sets. In 2007, she was drafted by the Boston Lobsters of the WTT pro league.

== Career ==
=== 2008 ===
In 2008, Ditty qualified for the Open Gaz de France tournament in Paris where she lost to the No. 6 seed and former world No. 1, Amélie Mauresmo. During the Proximus Diamond Games in Antwerp, she made it through the first round by defeating Alona Bondarenko, who was seeded eighth, and got to the second round there before falling to qualifier Timea Bacsinszky 5–7, 4–6, after having leads in both sets. Her win over world No. 22, Alona Bondarenko, was best-ever career win. In August, Julie defeated Yuan Meng in the first round at Cincinnati, marking her first win in a WTA Tour main-draw since Antwerp.

=== 2009 ===
Ditty was named to the United States Fed Cup team for their match in February against Argentina, after Bethanie Mattek withdrew with an injury; she played doubles with Liezel Huber. They would win the decisive match for the U.S. team, 6–2, 6–3.

Following Fed Cup, Julie lost in the opening round in Midland and in Memphis. She did not play in March.

In April, she won her opening main-draw match in Charleston, South Carolina, defeating Ayumi Morita 6–1, 6–1. This would mark her first tour-level win for the year. In her next tournament, a $75k at Dothan, Alabama, Julie retired in her opening round against Yan Zi. In doubles, she partnered with Carly Gullickson to extend her record of USTA ITF titles to 35 as they would win the doubles title.

In May, she entered the singles qualifying draws in Rome, Madrid, Strasbourg, and the French Open, failing to qualify in all four. In Rome, she partnered with Jill Craybas to win their opening round before falling in the second.

=== 2010 ===
Ditty appeared in the Family Circle Cup, Miami Open, and in Wimbledon. She won her first qualifying match against Margalita Chakhnashvili, 6–4, 6–3. She then went on to defeat Jelena Dokić, 5–7, 7–5, 6–2 to reach the final round of qualifying where she lost a place in the main draw to compatriot Bethanie Mattek-Sands.

=== 2014 ===
In June 2014, Ditty emerged from retirement and led Team Kentucky to a decisive win in the Southern Senior Cup Women's 35 and over division. She followed this up by winning the US Open National Playoff tournament for the Southern section.

== ITF Circuit finals ==
$100,000 tournaments
$75,000 tournaments
$50,000 tournaments
$25,000 tournaments
$10,000 tournaments

=== Singles: 14 (9 titles, 5 runner-ups) ===
Result	No.	Date	Tournament	Surface	Opponent	Score
Loss	1.	June 24, 2001	ITF Easton, US	Hard	(South Korea) Jeon Mi-ra	4–6, 6–7^{(4–7)}
Win	1.	July 8, 2001	ITF Waco, US	Hard	(India) Jahnavi Parekh	6–4, 6–2
Win	2.	September 29, 2002	ITF Raleigh, US	Clay	(Haiti) Neyssa Etienne	7–5, 3–6, 6–4
Win	3.	October 6, 2002	ITF Winter Park, US	Clay	(Czech Republic) Vladimíra Uhlířová	6–2, 4–6, 6–4
Win	4.	June 4, 2006	ITF Houston, US	Hard (i)	(Slovenia) Petra Rampre	6–4, 6–7^{(4–7)}, 6–3
Win	5.	June 11, 2006	ITF Hilton Head, US	Hard	(United States) Madison Brengle	6–3, 6–2
Loss	2.	November 19, 2006	ITF Lawrenceville, US	Hard	(Canada) Stéphanie Dubois	3–6, 6–7^{(6–8)}
Win	6.	February 4, 2007	ITF Palm Desert, US	Hard	(Germany) Angelique Kerber	6–1, 6–0
Win	7.	April 29, 2007	ITF Sea Island, US	Clay	(Romania) Anda Perianu	6–3, 6–2
Win	8.	October 21, 2007	ITF Lawrenceville, US	Hard	(United States) Angela Haynes	7–6^{(8–6)}, 6–4
Win	9.	September 21, 2008	ITF Albuquerque, US	Hard	(Paraguay) Rossana de los Ríos	6–4, 7–6^{(7–3)}
Loss	3.	October 19, 2008	ITF Lawrenceville, US	Hard	(United States) Shenay Perry	1–6, 3–6
Loss	4.	November 9, 2008	ITF Auburn, US	Hard	(Romania) Edina Gallovits	0–6, 7–6^{(9–7)}, 5–7
Loss	5.	November 16, 2008	ITF San Diego, US	Hard	(Romania) Edina Gallovits	6–4, 3–6, 2–6

=== Doubles: 52 (30 titles, 22 runner-ups) ===
Result	No.	Date	Tournament	Surface	Partner	Opponents	Score
Loss	1.	August 8, 1999	ITF Harrisonburg, United States	Hard	(Chinese Taipei) Wang I-ting	(United States) Amanda Augustus (Australia) Amy Jensen	7–5, 3–6, 2–6
Win	1.	July 1, 2001	ITF Edmond, United States	Hard	(United States) Michelle Dasso	(New Zealand) Ilke Gers (New Zealand) Tracey O'Connor	6–4, 7–5
Loss	2.	August 5, 2001	Lexington Challenger, United States	Hard	(Venezuela) Milagros Sequera	(Australia) Lisa McShea (Japan) Nana Miyagi	0–6, 4–6
Loss	3.	July 7, 2002	ITF Waco, United States	Hard	(United States) Michelle Dasso	(Israel) Marina Bernshtein (Haiti) Neyssa Etienne	4–6, 6–4, 4–6
Loss	4.	September 22, 2002	ITF Greenville, United States	Clay	(United States) Michelle Dasso	(Canada) Jennifer Radman (United States) Brooke Skeen	6–4, 5–7, 3–6
Win	2.	September 29, 2002	ITF Raleigh, United States	Clay	(United States) Michelle Dasso	(Argentina) Erica Krauth (Argentina) Vanesa Krauth	7–6^{(4)}, 6–3
Win	3.	October 6, 2002	ITF Winter Park, United States	Clay	(United States) Michelle Dasso	(United States) Marilyn Baker (Canada) Ioana Plesu	6–2, 6–1
Loss	5.	April 27, 2003	Dothan Classic, United States	Clay	(Uzbekistan) Varvara Lepchenko	(Venezuela) Milagros Sequera (Australia) Christina Wheeler	7–5, 1–6, 2–6
Loss	6.	May 18, 2003	ITF Charlottesville, U.S.	Clay	(Australia) Christina Wheeler	(United States) Bethanie Mattek (United States) Lilia Osterloh	5–7, 1–6
Win	4.	June 29, 2003	ITF Edmond, United States	Hard	(United States) Kelly McCain	(United States) Angela Haynes (United States) Jacqueline Trail	6–3, 6–3
Win	5.	August 3, 2003	ITF Louisville, United States	Hard	(Australia) Lisa McShea	(United States) Teryn Ashley (United States) Shenay Perry	7–6^{(4)}, 6–7^{(5)}, 6–3
Loss	7.	January 25, 2004	ITF Boca Raton, United States	Hard	(United States) Allison Bradshaw	(China) Peng Shuai (China) Xie Yanze	1–6, 2–6
Win	6.	February 1, 2004	ITF Boca Raton, United States	Hard	(United States) Allison Bradshaw	(Belarus) Natallia Dziamidzenka (India) Sania Mirza	6–3, 6–1
Loss	8.	April 4, 2004	ITF Augusta, United States	Hard	(United States) Jessica Lehnhoff	(Italy) Francesca Lubiani (United States) Mashona Washington	1–6, 3–6
Loss	9.	July 25, 2004	ITF Schenectady, United States	Hard	(United States) Ansley Cargill	(Australia) Casey Dellacqua (Australia) Nicole Sewell	6–3, 6–7^{(2)}, 2–6
Win	7.	August 8, 2004	ITF Louisville, United States	Hard	(Romania) Edina Gallovits	(Republic of Ireland) Claire Curran (South Africa) Natalie Grandin	1–6, 6–4, 6–2
Win	8.	October 10, 2004	ITF Lafayette, United States	Clay	(United States) Kristen Schlukebir	(South Africa) Natalie Grandin (United States) Arpi Kojian	6–2, 7–5
Win	9.	January 16, 2005	ITF Tampa, United States	Hard	(Czech Republic) Vladimíra Uhlířová	(United States) Cory Ann Avants (United States) Kristen Schlukebir	6–1, 6–2
Win	10.	January 23, 2005	ITF Miami, United States	Hard	(Czech Republic) Vladimíra Uhlířová	(Canada) Mélanie Marois (United States) Sarah Riske	6–3, 2–6, 7–6^{(3)}
Win	11.	February 6, 2005	ITF Rockford, United States	Hard (i)	(Czech Republic) Vladimíra Uhlířová	(Canada) Joana Cortez (Bulgaria) Svetlana Krivencheva	3–6, 7–5, 7–5
Loss	10.	April 24, 2005	Dothan Classic, United States	Clay	(Czech Republic) Vladimíra Uhlířová	(United States) Carly Gullickson (Russia) Galina Voskoboeva	6–4, 1–6, 2–6
Win	12.	June 12, 2005	ITF Allentown, United States	Hard	(United States) Ansley Cargill	(United States) Cory Ann Avants (United States) Kristen Schlukebir	6–2- 6–3
Loss	11.	July 17, 2005	ITF Louisville, United States	Hard	(United States) Teryn Ashley	(Belarus) Natallia Dziamidzenka (Romania) Anda Perianu	5–7, 6–2, 4–6
Win	13.	September 26, 2005	ITF Albuquerque, United States	Hard	(Venezuela) Milagros Sequera	(Indonesia) Romana Tedjakusuma (Thailand) Napaporn Tongsalee	6–3, 6–7^{(6)}, 7–6^{(2)}
Win	14.	October 9, 2005	ITF Troy, United States	Hard	(Venezuela) Milagros Sequera	(Georgia (country)) Salome Devidze (Luxembourg) Mandy Minella	6–2, 6–2
Loss	12.	January 29, 2006	ITF Waikoloa, United States	Hard	(United States) Lilia Osterloh	(Chinese Taipei) Chan Chin-wei (Canada) Marie-Ève Pelletier	5–7, 6–4, 2–6
Win	15.	February 24, 2006	ITF St. Paul, United States	Hard (i)	(Venezuela) Milagros Sequera	(Czech Republic) Eva Hrdinová (Czech Republic) Michaela Paštiková	4–6, 7–6^{(5)}, 6–2
Loss	13.	June 11, 2006	ITF Hilton Head, United States	Hard	(United States) Ansley Cargill	(United States) Christina Fusano (United States) Raquel Kops-Jones	6–7^{(6)}, 4–6
Loss	14.	June 18, 2006	ITF Allentown, United States	Hard	(United States) Ansley Cargill	(United States) Carly Gullickson (Ukraine) Tetiana Luzhanska	3–6, 4–6
Win	16.	August 20, 2006	Bronx Open, United States	Hard	(South Africa) Natalie Grandin	(Czech Republic) Lucie Hradecká (Czech Republic) Michaela Paštiková	6–1, 7–6^{(2)}
Win	17.	September 24, 2006	ITF Albuquerque, United States	Hard	(Venezuela) Milagros Sequera	(United States) Christina Fusano (United States) Aleke Tsoubanos	6–1, 6–4
Win	18.	October 1, 2006	ITF Ashland, United States	Hard	(Venezuela) Milagros Sequera	(United States) Ashley Harkleroad (Hungary) Ágnes Szávay	6–3, 5–7, 6–2
Win	19.	October 22, 2006	Houston Challenger, United States	Hard	(Ukraine) Tetiana Luzhanska	(United States) Laura Granville (United States) Carly Gullickson	6–4, 4–6, 7–5
Win	20.	November 19, 2006	ITF Lawrenceville, United States	Hard	(New Zealand) Leanne Baker	(United States) Christina Fusano (United States) Aleke Tsoubanos	7–6^{(5)}, 6–4
Loss	15.	January 27, 2007	ITF Waikoloa, United States	Hard	(Latvia) Līga Dekmeijere	(South Africa) Natalie Grandin (United States) Raquel Kops-Jones	0–6, 3–6
Win	21.	February 4, 2007	ITF Palm Desert, United States	Hard	(Romania) Edina Gallovits	(South Africa) Natalie Grandin (United States) Raquel Kops-Jones	6–2, 6–1
Win	22.	March 25, 2007	ITF Redding, United States	Hard	(Chinese Taipei) Chan Chin-wei	(Argentina) Jorgelina Cravero (Chinese Taipei) Hsieh Su-wei	6–3, 6–2
Loss	16.	August 4, 2007	ITF Washington, United States	Hard	(South Africa) Natalie Grandin	(Argentina) Jorgelina Cravero (Argentina) Betina Jozami	6–1, 1–6, 2–6
Loss	17.	August 18, 2007	Bronx Open, United States	Hard	(United States) Raquel Kops-Jones	(Czech Republic) Lucie Hradecká (Poland) Urszula Radwańska	2–6, 4–6
Loss	18.	October 21, 2007	ITF Lawrenceville, U.S.	Hard	(New Zealand) Leanne Baker	(Canada) Stéphanie Dubois (Russia) Alisa Kleybanova	2–6, 0–6
Win	23.	June 6, 2008	Surbiton Trophy, England	Grass	(United States) Abigail Spears	(United Kingdom) Sarah Borwell (United Kingdom) Elizabeth Thomas	7–6^{(2)}, 6–2
Win	24.	September 21, 2008	ITF Albuquerque, U.S.	Hard	(United States) Carly Gullickson	(Argentina) Jorgelina Cravero (Argentina) Betina Jozami	6–3, 6–4
Loss	19.	September 28, 2008	ITF Ashland, United States	Hard	(United States) Carly Gullickson	(Latvia) Līga Dekmeijere (Croatia) Jelena Pandžić	3–6, 6–3, [8–10]
Win	25.	October 19, 2008	ITF Lawrenceville, United States	Hard	(United States) Carly Gullickson	(Indonesia) Yayuk Basuki (Indonesia) Romana Tedjakusuma	3–6, 6–4, [12–10]
Win	26.	April 26, 2009	Dothan Classic, United States	Hard	(United States) Carly Gullickson	(Russia) Ekaterina Bychkova (Russia) Alexandra Panova	2–6, 6–1, [10–6]
Win	27.	May 2, 2010	ITF Charlottesville, U.S.	Clay	(United States) Carly Gullickson	(United States) Alexandra Mueller (United States) Ahsha Rolle	6–4, 6–3
Loss	20.	May 9, 2010	ITF Indian Harbour Beach, U.S.	Clay	(United States) Carly Gullickson	(United States) Christina Fusano (United States) Courtney Nagle	3–6, 6–7^{(4)}
Win	28.	October 9, 2010	ITF Kansas City, U.S.	Hard	(United States) Abigail Spears	(United States) Lauren Albanese (United States) Irina Falconi	6–2, 4–6, [10–3]
Loss	21.	November 6, 2010	ITF Grapevine, U.S.	Hard	(South Africa) Chanelle Scheepers	(United States) Ahsha Rolle (United States) Mashona Washington	7–5, 2–6, [9–11]
Win	29.	February 5, 2011	ITF Rancho Santa Fe, U.S.	Hard	(Bosnia and Herzegovina) Mervana Jugić-Salkić	(Japan) Shuko Aoyama (Japan) Remi Tezuka	6–0, 6–2
Win	30.	March 5, 2011	ITF Hammond, U.S.	Hard	(United States) Christina Fusano	(Bosnia and Herzegovina) Mervana Jugić-Salkić (United Kingdom) Melanie South	6–3, 6–3
Loss	22.	April 30, 2011	ITF Charlottesville, U.S.	Clay	(United States) Carly Gullickson	(Canada) Sharon Fichman (Canada) Marie-Ève Pelletier	4–6, 3–6

== Personal life ==
Ditty is the aunt to Gavin Lochow, an FCS Central freshman All-American wide receiver for the Dayton Flyers

== Death ==
Julie Ditty died on August 31, 2021, at the age of 42 after battling breast cancer.
