= Sarah Riske =

American tennis player

- Full name: Sarah Elizabeth McGlamery
- Country (sports): United States
- Born: June 27, 1981 (age 44)
- Plays: Right-handed
- Prize money: $27,659

Singles
- Career record: 1 ITF
- Highest ranking: No. 372 (August 16, 2004)

Doubles
- Career record: 4 ITF
- Highest ranking: No. 213 (November 28, 2005)

Sarah Elizabeth McGlamery (née Riske; born June 27, 1981) is an American former professional tennis player.

Growing up in Pennsylvania, Riske attended Peters Township High School and won two PIAA state singles championships. She won a national U-18 grass court championship and was a four-time All-American for Vanderbilt University. On the professional tour she attained best rankings of 372 in singles and 213 in doubles.

Riske now lives in Nashville and is married to Todd McGlamery. She is the elder sister of WTA Tour player Alison Riske, who she both mentored and coached. Her brother-in-law, Stephen Amritraj, was also a tennis player.

== ITF Circuit finals ==
Legend
$50,000 tournaments
$25,000 tournaments
$10,000 tournaments

=== Singles: 3 (1–2) ===
| Outcome | No. | Date | Tournament | Surface | Opponent | Score |
|---|---|---|---|---|---|---|
| Runner-up | 1. | Apr 2004 | ITF Obregón, Mexico | Hard | (Japan) Ayami Takase | 6–7^{(5)}, 2–6 |
| Winner | 1. | Jun 2005 | ITF Edmond, United States | Hard | (Romania) Anda Perianu | 3–6, 6–3, 6–4 |
| Runner-up | 2. | Jul 2005 | ITF St. Joseph, United States | Hard | (Indonesia) Wynne Prakusya | 2–6, 4–6 |

=== Doubles: 10 (4–6) ===
| Outcome | No. | Date | Tournament | Surface | Partner | Opponents | Score |
|---|---|---|---|---|---|---|---|
| Winner | 1. | July 2001 | ITF Baltimore, United States | Hard | (United States) Celena McCoury | (Japan) Sachie Umehara (South Korea) Kim Jin-hee | 6–3, 4–6, 6–2 |
| Runner-up | 1. | Oct 2003 | ITF Mexico City, Mexico | Hard | (United States) Kaysie Smashey | (Canada) Mélanie Marois (United States) Amanda Augustus | 6–7^{(6)}, 2–6 |
| Winner | 2. | Mar 2004 | ITF Monterrey, Mexico | Hard | (United States) Katie Granson | (Venezuela) Stephanie Schaer (Japan) Ayami Takase | 4–6, 7–5, 6–1 |
| Winner | 3. | Apr 2004 | ITF Morelia, Mexico | Hard | (United States) Katie Granson | (Brazil) Fernanda Caputi (Brazil) Marcela Evangelista | 6–2, 6–0 |
| Runner-up | 2. | Jun 2004 | ITF Périgueux, France | Clay | (Canada) Erica Biro | (Argentina) Natalia Gussoni (Brazil) Maria Fernanda Alves | 1–6, 2–6 |
| Runner-up | 3. | Oct 2004 | ITF Pelham, United States | Clay | (United States) Aleke Tsoubanos | (Belarus) Natallia Dziamidzenka (Latvia) Līga Dekmeijere | 3–6, 1–6 |
| Runner-up | 4. | Jan 2005 | ITF Miami, United States | Hard | (Canada) Mélanie Marois | (United States) Julie Ditty (Czech Republic) Vladimíra Uhlířová | 3–6, 6–2, 6–7^{(3)} |
| Runner-up | 5. | Feb 2005 | ITF St. Paul, United States | Hard | (Canada) Mélanie Marois | (Ukraine) Yuliya Beygelzimer (Germany) Sandra Klösel | 2–6, 1–6 |
| Runner-up | 6. | Jun 2005 | ITF Edmond, United States | Hard | (United States) Robin Stephenson | (United States) Tamara Encina (United States) Daron Moore | 6–7, 4–6 |
| Winner | 4. | Aug 2005 | ITF Vancouver, Canada | Hard | (United Kingdom) Sarah Borwell | (United States) Lauren Barnikow (Germany) Antonia Matic | 6–4, 3–6, 7–6^{(0)} |
