= Kaysie Smashey =

American tennis player

- Country (sports): United States
- Born: April 11, 1980 (age 45) El Paso, Texas, United States
- Plays: Right-handed
- Prize money: US$ 30,104

Singles
- Career record: 47–60
- Highest ranking: No. 451 (October 25, 2004)

Doubles
- Career record: 88–61
- Career titles: 4 ITF
- Highest ranking: No. 146 (July 4, 2005)

Kaysie Smashey (born April 11, 1980) is an American former professional tennis player.

Smashey, who was born and raised in El Paso, played college tennis on a scholarship for the Texas Longhorns between 1999 and 2002. On the professional tour, Smashey reached a best ranking of 451 in singles and 146 in doubles. She made four doubles main-draw appearances on the WTA Tour, with her best performance a quarterfinal appearance at Memphis in 2005. Her four ITF doubles titles included the $50,000 Waikoloa tournament.

== ITF Circuit finals ==
Legend
$50,000 tournaments
$25,000 tournaments
$10,000 tournaments

=== Doubles: 14 (4 titles, 10 runner-ups) ===
Result	No.	Date	Tournament	Surface	Partner	Opponents	Score
Loss	1.	Jun 1996	ITF El Paso, United States	Hard	(United States) Sara Walker	(United States) Rebecca Jensen (United States) Kristine Kurth	4–6, 4–6
Win	1.	Jun 1997	ITF El Paso, United States	Hard	(United States) Sara Walker	(United States) Anne Mall (Canada) Renata Kolbovic	6–7, 6–4, 6–0
Loss	2.	May 1998	ITF El Paso, United States	Hard	(United States) Sara Walker	(Japan) Keiko Ishida (Japan) Keiko Nagatomi	2–6, 3–6
Loss	3.	May 2000	ITF El Paso, United States	Hard	(United States) Sandy Sureephong	(India) Manisha Malhotra (New Zealand) Leanne Baker	2–6, 6–7
Loss	4.	Oct 2003	ITF Mexico City, Mexico	Hard	(United States) Sarah Riske	(United States) Amanda Augustus (Canada) Mélanie Marois	6–7^{(6)}, 2–6
Win	2.	Nov 2003	ITF Puebla, Mexico	Hard	(United States) Stephanie Hazlett	(Bulgaria) Dimana Krastevitch (United States) Tiffany Dabek	6–1, 7–5
Loss	5.	Mar 2004	ITF Benalla, Australia	Grass	(Australia) Lauren Breadmore	(New Zealand) Paula Marama (New Zealand) Eden Marama	5–7, 1–6
Loss	6.	Jun 2004	ITF Hamilton, Canada	Clay	(Canada) Aneta Soukup	(Argentina) Soledad Esperón (Argentina) Flavia Mignola	6–7^{(4)}, 6–3, 4–6
Loss	7.	Jun 2004	ITF Mont-Tremblant, Canada	Clay	(Canada) Aneta Soukup	(Argentina) Soledad Esperón (Argentina) Flavia Mignola	0–6, 6–2, 6–7^{(6)}
Loss	8.	Jul 2004	ITF College Park, United States	Hard	(Belarus) Natallia Dziamidzenka	(Japan) Shiho Hisamatsu (Japan) Seiko Okamoto	6–7^{(5)}, 2–6
Loss	9.	Dec 2004	ITF Palm Beach Gardens, United States	Clay	(United States) Kelly McCain	(Latvia) Līga Dekmeijere (United States) Nana Smith	3–6, 2–6
Win	3.	Jan 2005	ITF Waikoloa, United States	Hard	(South Africa) Natalie Grandin	(Australia) Lauren Breadmore (Japan) Ayami Takase	6–3, 6–4
Win	4.	May 2005	ITF Houston, United States	Hard	(Romania) Anda Perianu	(United States) Raquel Kops-Jones (United States) Aleke Tsoubanos	4–6, 6–2, 6–4
Loss	10.	Jul 2005	ITF Los Gatos, United States	Hard	(United States) Lindsay Lee-Waters	(United States) Teryn Ashley (United States) Carly Gullickson	4–6, 6–4, 1–6
