= Anda Perianu =

Romanian tennis player

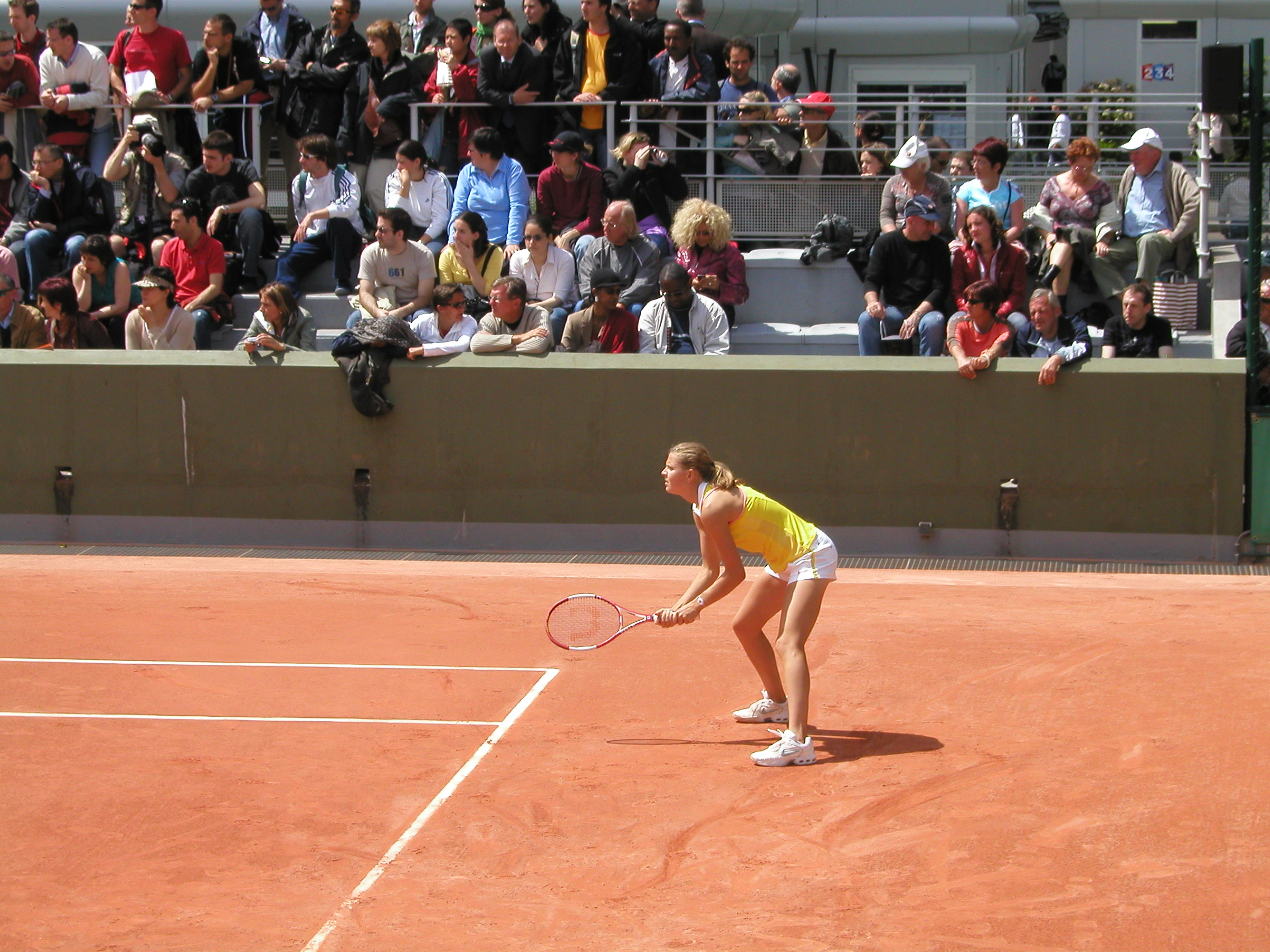
- Country (sports): Romania
- Born: 4 July 1980 (age 45)
- Height: 1.70 m (5 ft 7 in)
- Turned pro: 2004
- Retired: 2015
- Plays: Right-handed (two-handed backhand)
- Prize money: $137,172

Singles
- Career record: 131–84
- Career titles: 3 ITF
- Highest ranking: No. 120 (24 July 2006)

Grand Slam singles results
- French Open: 2R (2006)

Doubles
- Career record: 53–41
- Career titles: 5 ITF
- Highest ranking: No. 213 (May 22, 2006)

Grand Slam mixed doubles results
- US Open: 1R (2015)

Anda Perianu (born July 4, 1980) is a Romanian former professional tennis player.

On 24 July 2006, she reached her highest WTA singles ranking of 120 whilst her best WTA doubles ranking was 213 on 22 May 2006.

She was coached by Silviu Tănăsoiu.

== ITF Circuit finals ==
=== Singles: 14 (3 titles, 11 runner-ups) ===
Legend
$100,000 tournaments
$75,000 tournaments
$50,000 tournaments
$25,000 tournaments
$10,000 tournaments

| Outcome | No. | Date | Tournament | Surface | Opponent | Score |
|---|---|---|---|---|---|---|
| Runner-up | 1. | 29 June 2004 | ITF Southlake, United States | Hard | (United States) Nicole Leimbach | 0–6, 4–6 |
| Runner-up | 2. | 20 July 2004 | ITF Evansville, United States | Hard | (United States) Nicole Leimbach | 3–6, 1–6 |
| Runner-up | 3. | 25 January 2004 | ITF Clearwater, United States | Hard | (United States) Ahsha Rolle | 4–6, 3–6 |
| Winner | 4. | 11 January 2005 | ITF Tampa, United States | Hard | (China) Yanze Xie | 7–5, 5–7, 6–4 |
| Winner | 5. | 17 May 2005 | ITF El Paso, United States | Hard | (United States) Raquel Kops-Jones | 3–6, 7–6, 6–2 |
| Winner | 6. | 24 May 2005 | ITF Houston, United States | Hard (i) | (United States) Raquel Kops-Jones | 6–2, 6–3 |
| Runner-up | 7. | 21 June 2005 | ITF Edmond, United States | Hard | (United States) Sarah Riske | 6–3, 3–6, 4–6 |
| Runner-up | 8. | 19 July 2005 | ITF Hammond, United States | Hard | (Japan) Miho Saeki | 3–6, 6–2, 1–6 |
| Runner-up | 9. | 18 October 2005 | ITF Houston, United States | Hard | (United States) Amy Frazier | 3–6, 6–3, 4–6 |
| Runner-up | 10. | 5 February 2006 | ITF Rockford, United States | Hard (i) | (Canada) Stéphanie Dubois | 6–7, 3–6 |
| Runner-up | 11. | 9 April 2006 | ITF Pelham, United States | Clay | (Russia) Vasilisa Bardina | 1–6, 4–6 |
| Runner-up | 12. | 29 April 2007 | ITF Sea Island, United States | Clay | (United States) Julie Ditty | 3–6, 2–6 |
| Runner-up | 13. | 13 October 2008 | ITF St. Louis, United States | Hard | (United States) Lindsey Hardenbergh | 5–7, 6–7 |
| Runner-up | 14. | 25 May 2009 | ITF Sumter, United States | Hard | (Slovenia) Petra Rampre | 1–6, 4–6 |

=== Doubles: 7 (5 titles, 2 runner-ups) ===
Legend
$100,000 tournaments
$75,000 tournaments
$50,000 tournaments
$25,000 tournaments
$10,000 tournaments

| Outcome | No. | Date | Tournament | Surface | Partner | Opponents | Score |
|---|---|---|---|---|---|---|---|
| Runner-up | 1. | 13 July 2004 | ITF Baltimore, United States | Hard | (United States) Kelly Schmandt | (United States) Arpi Kojian (Austria) Nicole Melch | 6–7^{(5)}, 6–3, 3–6 |
| Winner | 1. | 17 May 2005 | ITF El Paso, United States | Hard | (United States) Beau Jones | (United States) Krista Damico (United States) Cristina Moros | 7–5, 6–3 |
| Winner | 2. | 24 May 2005 | ITF Houston, United States | Hard | (United States) Kaysie Smashey | (United States) Raquel Kops-Jones (United States) Aleke Tsoubanos | 4–6, 6–2, 6–4 |
| Winner | 3. | 17 July 2005 | ITF Louisville, United States | Hard | (Belarus) Natallia Dziamidzenka | (United States) Teryn Ashley (United States) Julie Ditty | 7–5, 2–6, 6–4 |
| Runner-up | 2. | 29 April 2007 | ITF Sea Island, United States | Clay | (South Africa) Chanelle Scheepers | (United States) Raquel Kops-Jones (United States) Lilia Osterloh | 5–7, 3–6 |
| Winner | 4. | 27 June 2008 | ITF Padua, Italy | Clay | (Romania) Liana Ungur | (Argentina) Mailen Auroux (Germany) Carmen Klaschka | 6–3, 6–3 |
| Winner | 5. | 19 October 2008 | ITF St. Louis, United States | Hard | (Belarus) Anna Orlik | (Japan) Tomoko Dokei (United States) Mami Inoue | 6–2, 6–1 |
