= Lauren Fisher =

American tennis player

- Full name: Lauren DeFazio Fisher
- Country (sports): United States
- Born: September 14, 1982 (age 42); Pittsburgh, United States
- Plays: Right-handed
- Prize money: $12,552

Singles
- Career record: 6–22
- Highest ranking: No. 799 (May 22, 2006)

Doubles
- Career record: 28–29
- Career titles: 3 ITF
- Highest ranking: No. 354 (Dec 12, 2005)

Grand Slam doubles results
- US Open: 1R (2004)

Lauren DeFazio Fisher (born September 14, 1982) is an American former professional tennis player.

Born and raised in Pittsburgh, Fisher competed in collegiate tennis for the UCLA Bruins between 2000 and 2004, twice earning All-American honors for doubles. In 2004 she partnered with Daniela Berček to win the NCAA Division I doubles championship.

Fisher featured in the doubles main draw of the 2004 US Open, as a wildcard pairing with Raquel Kops-Jones.

From 2004 and 2006, Fisher competed on the professional tour and won three doubles titles on the ITF Women's Circuit.

== ITF finals ==
Legend
$25,000 tournaments
$10,000 tournaments

=== Doubles (3–1) ===
Result	No.	Date	Tournament	Surface	Partner	Opponents	Score
Win	1.	September 19, 2004	Matamoros, Mexico	Hard	(United States) Aleke Tsoubanos	(United States) Tamara Encina (United States) Alison Ojeda	6–3, 6–7^{(7)}, 7–6^{(5)}
Win	2.	January 31, 2005	Clearwater, United States	Hard	(United States) Amanda Johnson	(Russia) Anna Bastrikova (Belarus) Natallia Dziamidzenka	4–6, 6–4, 6–3
Loss	1.	March 13, 2005	Toluca, Mexico	Hard	(United States) Christina Fusano	(Chile) Valentina Castro (Uruguay) Ana Lucía Migliarini de León	2–6, 6–4, 5–7
Win	3.	September 2, 2005	Vittoria, Italy	Clay	(Spain) Carla Suárez Navarro	(Italy) Silvia Disderi (Italy) Giorgia Mortello	6–2, 6–3
