= Mélanie Marois =

Canadian tennis player

- Full name: Mélanie Marois
- Country (sports): Canada
- Born: 10 March 1984 (age 41) Quebec, Canada
- Plays: Right-handed
- Prize money: $66,589

Singles
- Highest ranking: No. 235 (6 October 2003)

Doubles
- Highest ranking: No. 138 (2 February 2004)

Mélanie Marois (born 10 March 1984) is a former professional tennis player from Canada.

== Biography ==
A right-handed player from Quebec, Marois was a regular competitor at the local Challenge Bell WTA Tour tournament, appearing in every main draw from 1999 to 2004.

Marois featured in the doubles rubber of four Fed Cup ties for Canada, all in 2004 and partnering Marie-Ève Pelletier.

Retiring in 2005 due to fibula tendonitis, she has since remained involved in tennis as an occasional commentator for Canadian French language broadcaster RDS.

== ITF finals ==
$50,000 tournaments
$25,000 tournaments
$10,000 tournaments

=== Singles (3–2) ===
Outcome	No.	Date	Tournament	Surface	Opponent	Score
Runner-up	1.	29 July 2001	Vancouver, Canada	Hard	(Japan) Miho Saeki	1–6, 4–6
Winner	1.	28 May 2002	Louisville, United States	Hard	(Russia) Ekaterina Afinogenova	1–6, 6–3, 6–3
Winner	2.	5 August 2002	Montreal, Canada	Hard	(Canada) Diana Srebrovic	6–0, 6–3
Runner-up	2.	12 January 2003	Tallahassee, United States	Hard	(Canada) Jana Nejedly	4–6, 0–6
Winner	3.	6 June 2004	Hilton Head Island, United States	Hard	(Belarus) Natallia Dziamidzenka	6–4, 5–7, 6–4

=== Doubles (3–5) ===
Outcome	No.	Date	Tournament	Surface	Partner	Opponents	Score
Runner-up	1.	28 June 1998	Montreal, Canada	Hard	(Canada) Katherine Rammo	(Canada) Renata Kolbovic (Canada) Vanessa Webb	3–6, 1–6
Winner	1.	23 June 2002	Montreal, Canada	Hard	(United States) Michelle Faucher	(Japan) Kaori Aoyama (Japan) Remi Tezuka	6–3, 3–6, 6–1
Winner	2.	13 July 2003	Vancouver, Canada	Hard	(United States) Amanda Augustus	(Australia) Nicole Sewell (Netherlands) Andrea van den Hurk	7–6^{(7–4)}, 6–4
Runner-up	2.	14 September 2003	Peachtree, United States	Hard	(United States) Amanda Augustus	(United States) Lauren Kalvaria (United States) Jessica Lehnhoff	6–4, 3–6, 1–6
Runner-up	3.	28 September 2003	Albuquerque, United States	Hard	(United States) Amanda Augustus	(United States) Samantha Reeves (Venezuela) Milagros Sequera	3–6, 2–6
Winner	3.	19 October 2003	Mexico City, Mexico	Hard	(United States) Amanda Augustus	(United States) Sarah Riske (United States) Kaysie Smashey	7–6^{(8–6)}, 6–2
Runner-up	4.	23 January 2005	Miami, United States	Hard	(United States) Sarah Riske	(United States) Julie Ditty (Czech Republic) Vladimíra Uhlířová	3–6, 6–2, 6–7^{(3–7)}
Runner-up	5.	27 February 2005	St. Paul, United States	Hard (i)	(United States) Sarah Riske	(Ukraine) Yuliya Beygelzimer (Germany) Sandra Klösel	2–6, 1–6

== See also ==
- List of Canada Fed Cup team representatives
