= Diana Srebrovic =

Canadian former professional tennis player

- Country (sports): Canada
- Born: 22 July 1984 (age 42) Oakville, Canada
- Retired: 2004
- Plays: Right-handed (two-handed backhand)
- College: Florida Gators
- Prize money: 22,669

Singles
- Career record: 62–44
- Highest ranking: No. 270 (3 November 2003)

Doubles
- Career record: 23–24
- Career titles: 1 ITF
- Highest ranking: No. 307 (21 July 2003)

Diana Srebrovic (born 22 July 1984) is a Canadian former professional tennis player.

Srebrovic has career-high WTA rankings of 270 in singles, achieved on 3 November 2003, and 307 in doubles, set on 21 July 2003. She has won 1 doubles titles on the ITF Women's Circuit. Her only WTA Tour main draw appearance came at the 2001 Challenge Bell, where she partnered Mélanie Marois in the doubles event.

She decided to follow the college route and played for the Florida Gators varsity tennis team from 2005 to 2007.

== ITF finals ==
$25,000 tournaments
$10,000 tournaments

=== Singles (1 titles, 2 runner–ups) ===
Result	W–L	Date	Tournament	Tier	Surface	Opponent	Score
Loss	0–1	July 2001	ITF Lachine, Canada	10,000	Hard	(United States) Teryn Ashley	6–2, 4–6, 0–6
Loss	0–2	August 2002	ITF Montreal, Canada	10,000	Hard	(Canada) Mélanie Marois	0–6, 3–6

=== Doubles (1 titles, 2 runner–ups) ===
Result	W–L	Date	Tournament	Tier	Surface	Partnering	Opponents	Score
Loss	0–1	May 2001	Midlothian, United States	25,000	Clay	(Canada) Maureen Drake	(United States) Jennifer Russell (United States) Abigail Spears	6–7^{(2)}, 6–1, 2–6
Loss	0–2	June 2002	ITF Toronto, Canada	10,000	Hard	(Canada) Aleksandra Wozniak	(Australia) Lauren Cheung (Australia) Christina Horiatopoulos	3–6, 1–6
Win	1–2	June 2003	ITF Hamilton, Canada	25,000	Clay	(United States) Alyssa Cohen	(Brazil) Maria Fernanda Alves (Canada) Aneta Soukup	6–1, 3–6, 6–3
