= Aneta Soukup =

Canadian tennis player

- Country (sports): Canada
- Born: December 30, 1978 (age 46) Czechoslovakia
- Plays: Right-handed
- Prize money: $38,692

Singles
- Career record: 72-153
- Career titles: 0
- Highest ranking: No. 476 (November 9, 1998)

Doubles
- Career record: 95-113
- Career titles: 6 ITF
- Highest ranking: No. 222 (November 15, 2004)

Aneta Soukup (born December 30, 1978) is a Canadian former professional tennis player.

== Biography ==
Soukup was raised in Kitchener, Ontario via Prague, having emigrated to Canada from Czechoslovakia.

Coached by her father Milos, she began competing on the professional tour in the late 1990s. Soukup, a right-handed player, partnered with Renata Kolbovic to win a bronze medal in the women's doubles at the 1999 Pan American Games in Winnipeg. In 2001 and 2002, she played college tennis for the Florida Gators of the University of Florida. Her best performance on the WTA Tour came at Quebec City in 2004, making the doubles quarterfinals with Kateryna Bondarenko.

== ITF finals ==
$25,000 tournaments
$10,000 tournaments

=== Singles (0–1) ===
| Result | No. | Date | Tournament | Surface | Opponent | Score |
|---|---|---|---|---|---|---|
| Loss | 1. | 28 October 1996 | Curaçao, Netherlands Antilles | Hard | (United States) Keirsten Alley | 3–6, 4–6 |

=== Doubles (6–6) ===
| Result | No. | Date | Tournament | Surface | Partner | Opponents | Score |
|---|---|---|---|---|---|---|---|
| Win | 1. | 14 April 1997 | Elvas, Portugal | Hard | (Norway) Tina Samara | (Brazil) Miriam D'Agostini (Spain) Alicia Ortuño | 6–4, 7–5 |
| Win | 2. | 4 May 1997 | Azeméis, Portugal | Clay | (Spain) Paula Hermida | (Israel) Shiri Burstein (Israel) Limor Gabai | 6–0, 6–4 |
| Loss | 1. | 2 June 1997 | Antalya, Turkey | Hard | (Russia) Maria Boboedova | (Turkey) Duygu Akşit Oal (Turkey) Gülberk Gültekin | w/o |
| Loss | 2. | 15 June 1997 | Velenje, Slovenia | Clay | (Czech Republic) Helena Fremuthová | (Slovenia) Tina Hergold (Slovenia) Tina Pisnik | w/o |
| Win | 3. | 8 October 2000 | Hallandale Beach, United States | Clay | (United States) Kristy Blumberg | (United States) Anne Plessinger (Chile) Nataly Rojas | 4-0, 4-1, 4-1 |
| Loss | 3. | 5 August 2001 | Harrisonburg, United States | Hard | (Latvia) Anžela Žguna | (South Africa) Lara van Rooyen (United States) Tetiana Luzhanska | 5–7, 6–3, 2–6 |
| Loss | 4. | 9 June 2003 | Hamilton, Canada | Clay | (Brazil) Maria Fernanda Alves | (United States) Alyssa Cohen (Canada) Diana Srebrovic | 1–6, 6–3, 3–6 |
| Loss | 5. | 7 June 2004 | Hamilton, Canada | Clay | (United States) Kaysie Smashey | (Argentina) Soledad Esperón (Argentina) Flavia Mignola | 6–7^{(4)}, 6–3, 4–6 |
| Loss | 6. | 20 June 2004 | Mont-Tremblant, Canada | Clay | (United States) Kaysie Smashey | (Argentina) Soledad Esperón (Argentina) Flavia Mignola | 0–6, 6–2, 6–7^{(6)} |
| Win | 4. | 11 July 2004 | Le Touquet, France | Clay | (Czech Republic) Janette Bejlková | (Czech Republic) Zuzana Černá (Russia) Ekaterina Kirianova | 2-6, 6-4, 6-2 |
| Win | 5. | 25 July 2004 | Zwevegem, Belgium | Clay | (Czech Republic) Zuzana Černá | (Belgium) Leslie Butkiewicz (New Zealand) Shelley Stephens | 6–3, 6–2 |
| Win | 6. | 26 September 2004 | Tunica, United States | Clay | (United States) Tetiana Luzhanska | (Latvia) Lïga Dekmeijere (Belarus) Natallia Dziamidzenka | 6–2, 6–1 |
