= 2004 French Open – Women's singles qualifying =

Women's singles qualifying
- 2004 French Open

Events
Singles	men	women		boys	girls
Doubles	men	women	mixed	boys	girls
WC Singles	men	women	quad
WC Doubles	men	women	quad
Legends	−45	45+	women

Qualification
Singles	men	women
- French Open

This article displays the qualifying draw for the Women's Singles at the 2004 French Open.

== Seeds ==
1. (United States) Marissa Irvin (qualified)
2. (United States) Shenay Perry (qualified)
3. (United States) Teryn Ashley (qualified)
4. (Italy) Roberta Vinci (qualified)
5. (Sweden) Sofia Arvidsson (second round)
6. (Czech Republic) Eva Birnerová (qualifying competition, lucky loser)
7. (Germany) Julia Schruff (qualified)
8. (United States) Mashona Washington (second round)
9. (Indonesia) Angelique Widjaja (second round)
10. (Ukraine) Yuliana Fedak (qualified)
11. (Estonia) Kaia Kanepi (second round)
12. (Italy) Adriana Serra Zanetti (second round)
13. (Japan) Yuka Yoshida (first round)
14. (Estonia) Maret Ani (second round)
15. (Israel) Tzipora Obziler (qualifying competition, lucky loser)
16. (Czech Republic) Zuzana Ondrášková (second round)
17. (Russia) Tatiana Panova (second round)
18. (Austria) Sybille Bammer (first round)
19. (Argentina) Natalia Gussoni (first round)
20. (Tunisia) Selima Sfar (second round)
21. (United States) Meilen Tu (second round)
22. (Germany) Stephanie Gehrlein (qualifying competition)
23. (Poland) Marta Domachowska (first round)
24. (China) Peng Shuai (qualifying competition)

== Qualifiers ==
1. (United States) Marissa Irvin
2. (United States) Shenay Perry
3. (United States) Teryn Ashley
4. (Italy) Roberta Vinci
5. (Bulgaria) Lubomira Bacheva
6. (Slovakia) Zuzana Kucová
7. (Germany) Julia Schruff
8. (Croatia) Sanda Mamić
9. (Czech Republic) Květa Peschke
10. (Ukraine) Yuliana Fedak
11. (Germany) Barbara Rittner
12. (United States) Kelly McCain

== Lucky losers ==
1. (Czech Republic) Eva Birnerová
2. (Israel) Tzipora Obziler

== Qualifying draw ==
Key

- Q = Qualifier
- WC = Wild card
- LL = Lucky loser
- Alt = Alternate
- ITF = ITF entry
- PR = Protected ranking
- SR = Special ranking
- SE = Special exempt
- JE = Junior exempt
- JR = Junior Accelerator Programme entrant
- CO = College Accelerator Programme entrant
- NG = Next Gen Accelerator Program entrant
- w/o = Walkover
- r = Retired
- d = Defaulted

=== First qualifier ===
First round
1	(United States) Marissa Irvin	6	6
(Chinese Taipei) Janet Lee	1	4
(Japan) Rika Fujiwara	6	6^{3}	2
(Slovakia) Eva Fislová	3	7^{7}	6
(Hungary) Rita Kuti-Kis	5	2
(United States) Jennifer Hopkins	7	6
(Russia) Galina Fokina	1	6	3
22	(Germany) Stephanie Gehrlein	6	2	6

Second round
1	(United States) Marissa Irvin	1	6	6
(Slovakia) Eva Fislová	6	2	4
(United States) Jennifer Hopkins	1	2
22	(Germany) Stephanie Gehrlein	6	6

Qualifying competition
1	(United States) Marissa Irvin	2	7^{8}	6
22	(Germany) Stephanie Gehrlein	6	6^{6}	4

=== Second qualifier ===
First round
2	(United States) Shenay Perry	6	7^{7}
(United States) Lilia Osterloh	3	6^{5}
(Germany) Sandra Klösel	4	6	2
(Italy) Nathalie Viérin	6	4	6
(Spain) Nuria Llagostera Vives	6	6
(Hungary) Katalin Marosi	1	0
(Canada) Maureen Drake	6^{4}	2
21	(United States) Meilen Tu	7^{7}	6

Second round
2	(United States) Shenay Perry	6	6
(Italy) Nathalie Viérin	4	3
(Spain) Nuria Llagostera Vives	6	6
21	(United States) Meilen Tu	4	1

Qualifying competition
2	(United States) Shenay Perry	6	4	6
(Spain) Nuria Llagostera Vives	1	6	2

=== Third qualifier ===
First round
3	(United States) Teryn Ashley	6	7
WC	(France) Servane Delobelle	4	5
(Croatia) Ivana Abramovic	6	5	6
WC	(France) Kildine Chevalier	3	7	2
(Japan) Aiko Nakamura	3	5
(China) Xie Yanze	6	7
(Czech Republic) Nicole Vaidišová	3	7	6
19	(Argentina) Natalia Gussoni	6	5	1

Second round
3	(United States) Teryn Ashley	6	6
(Croatia) Ivana Abramovic	4	2
(China) Xie Yanze	7^{10}	1	2
(Czech Republic) Nicole Vaidišová	6^{8}	6	6

Qualifying competition
3	(United States) Teryn Ashley	7^{8}	6
(Czech Republic) Nicole Vaidišová	6^{6}	3

=== Fourth qualifier ===
First round
4	(Italy) Roberta Vinci	6	6
WC	(France) Emmanuelle Edon	0	4
(Russia) Lioudmila Skavronskaia	4	6	1
WC	(France) Pauline Parmentier	6	2	6
(Slovakia) Stanislava Hrozenská	1	3
(Japan) Miho Saeki	6	6
WC	(France) Youlia Fedossova	2	4
16	(Czech Republic) Zuzana Ondrášková	6	6

Second round
4	(Italy) Roberta Vinci	6	7
WC	(France) Pauline Parmentier	4	5
(Japan) Miho Saeki	4	6	6
16	(Czech Republic) Zuzana Ondrášková	6	2	2

Qualifying competition
4	(Italy) Roberta Vinci	6	6
(Japan) Miho Saeki	1	1

=== Fifth qualifier ===
First round
5	(Sweden) Sofia Arvidsson	6	6
(Hungary) Virág Németh	1	2
(Bulgaria) Lubomira Bacheva	6	6
(Croatia) Lana Popadić	4	3
(United States) Ansley Cargill	0	1
(France) Capucine Rousseau	6	6
(Republic of Ireland) Kelly Liggan	3	2
15	(Israel) Tzipora Obziler	6	6

Second round
5	(Sweden) Sofia Arvidsson	6	1	1
(Bulgaria) Lubomira Bacheva	4	6	6
(France) Capucine Rousseau	6	4	1
15	(Israel) Tzipora Obziler	2	6	6

Qualifying competition
(Bulgaria) Lubomira Bacheva	4	6	6
15	(Israel) Tzipora Obziler	6	3	4

=== Sixth qualifier ===
First round
6	(Czech Republic) Eva Birnerová	1	6	6
(Hungary) Kira Nagy	6	1	1
(Ukraine) Alona Bondarenko	3	2
(South Africa) Natalie Grandin	6	6
WC	(France) Aurélie Védy	6	3	4
(Slovakia) Zuzana Kucová	0	6	6
(Canada) Marie-Ève Pelletier	4	5
17	(Russia) Tatiana Panova	6	7

Second round
6	(Czech Republic) Eva Birnerová	7^{7}	6
(South Africa) Natalie Grandin	6^{4}	3
(Slovakia) Zuzana Kucová	6	6
17	(Russia) Tatiana Panova	4	4

Qualifying competition
6	(Czech Republic) Eva Birnerová	7^{8}	5	6
(Slovakia) Zuzana Kucová	6^{6}	7	8

=== Seventh qualifier ===
First round
7	(Germany) Julia Schruff	6	6
(Thailand) Suchanun Viratprasert	1	1
(Puerto Rico) Vilmarie Castellvi	6	7^{7}
(Czech Republic) Michaela Paštiková	4	6^{5}
(Belarus) Tatiana Poutchek	6	6
(Ukraine) Elena Tatarkova	0	3
(Czech Republic) Libuše Prušová	4	3
24	(China) Peng Shuai	6	6

Second round
7	(Germany) Julia Schruff	6	6
(Puerto Rico) Vilmarie Castellvi	2	1
(Belarus) Tatiana Poutchek	2	3
24	(China) Peng Shuai	6	6

Qualifying competition
7	(Germany) Julia Schruff	7	2	6
24	(China) Peng Shuai	5	6	2

=== Eighth qualifier ===
First round
8	(United States) Mashona Washington	6	6
(Germany) Nina Dübbers	2	3
(Slovakia) Jarmila Gajdošová	4	1
(Croatia) Sanda Mamić	6	6
(Argentina) Clarisa Fernández	6	6
WC	(France) Florence Haring	4	3
(United States) Abigail Spears	2	4
14	(Estonia) Maret Ani	6	6

Second round
8	(United States) Mashona Washington	4	3
(Croatia) Sanda Mamić	6	6
(Argentina) Clarisa Fernández	6	6
14	(Estonia) Maret Ani	1	2

Qualifying competition
(Croatia) Sanda Mamić	4	6	2
(Argentina) Clarisa Fernández	6	2	0^{r}

=== Ninth qualifier ===
First round
9	(Indonesia) Angelique Widjaja	7^{7}	6
(Spain) Cristina Torrens Valero	6^{4}	3
(Czech Republic) Květa Peschke	6	7
(United Kingdom) Anne Keothavong	3	5
(Croatia) Ivana Lisjak	7^{7}	1	4
(Paraguay) Rossana de los Ríos	6^{5}	6	6
(United States) Bethanie Mattek	7	3	6
23	(Poland) Marta Domachowska	5	6	3

Second round
9	(Indonesia) Angelique Widjaja	3	1
(Czech Republic) Květa Peschke	6	6
(Paraguay) Rossana de los Ríos	7^{7}	6
(United States) Bethanie Mattek	6^{3}	2

Qualifying competition
(Czech Republic) Květa Peschke	6	6
(Paraguay) Rossana de los Ríos	2	4

=== Tenth qualifier ===
First round
10	(Ukraine) Yuliana Fedak	4	6	6
(Russia) Galina Voskoboeva	6	1	4
(Germany) Adriana Barna	6^{6}	6^{6}
(Croatia) Darija Jurak	7^{8}	7^{8}
(United States) Jessica Lehnhoff	4	6	6
(Germany) Angelika Bachmann	6	4	4
(Ukraine) Mariya Koryttseva	6	6
13	(Japan) Yuka Yoshida	1	0

Second round
10	(Ukraine) Yuliana Fedak	6	6
(Croatia) Darija Jurak	0	3
(United States) Jessica Lehnhoff	4	7^{7}	6
(Ukraine) Mariya Koryttseva	6	6^{0}	2

Qualifying competition
10	(Ukraine) Yuliana Fedak	6	6
(United States) Jessica Lehnhoff	0	2

=== Eleventh qualifier ===
First round
11	(Estonia) Kaia Kanepi	6	7
WC	(Iran) Aravane Rezaï	2	5
(Germany) Barbara Rittner	6	6
(Czech Republic) Lenka Nemecková	4	4
(Italy) Antonella Serra Zanetti	6	6
(Netherlands) Elise Tamaëla	4	4
(Hungary) Zsófia Gubacsi	7	3	6
18	(Austria) Sybille Bammer	5	6	3

Second round
11	(Estonia) Kaia Kanepi	5	6	2
(Germany) Barbara Rittner	7	2	6
(Italy) Antonella Serra Zanetti	4	4
(Hungary) Zsófia Gubacsi	6	6

Qualifying competition
(Germany) Barbara Rittner	6	7
(Hungary) Zsófia Gubacsi	3	5

=== Twelfth qualifier ===
First round
12	(Italy) Adriana Serra Zanetti	6	6
(Belarus) Anastasiya Yakimova	4	4
(Romania) Edina Gallovits	6	6
(Austria) Patricia Wartusch	0	1
(United States) Kelly McCain	2	6	6
(Slovakia) Janette Husárová	6	4	1
(Ukraine) Oleksandra Kravets	2	5
20	(Tunisia) Selima Sfar	6	7

Second round
12	(Italy) Adriana Serra Zanetti	1	6	5
(Romania) Edina Gallovits	6	1	7
(United States) Kelly McCain	7	7
20	(Tunisia) Selima Sfar	5	5

Qualifying competition
(Romania) Edina Gallovits	6	3	2
(United States) Kelly McCain	4	6	6
