= 2004 French Open – Men's singles qualifying =

Men's singles qualifying
- 2004 French Open

Events
Singles	men	women		boys	girls
Doubles	men	women	mixed	boys	girls
WC Singles	men	women	quad
WC Doubles	men	women	quad
Legends	−45	45+	women

Qualification
Singles	men	women
- French Open

This article displays the qualifying draw for the Men's Singles at the 2004 French Open.

== Seeds ==
1. (Spain) Albert Montañés (first round)
2. (Germany) Florian Mayer (qualified)
3. (Chinese Taipei) Lu Yen-hsun (second round)
4. (United States) Jeff Salzenstein (qualifying competition, lucky loser)
5. (Argentina) Martín Vassallo Argüello (second round)
6. (Belgium) Kristof Vliegen (qualifying competition, lucky loser)
7. (Spain) Marc López (qualifying competition, lucky loser)
8. (Italy) Davide Sanguinetti (first round)
9. (United States) Paul Goldstein (first round)
10. (South Korea) Lee Hyung-taik (qualifying competition, lucky loser)
11. (United States) Jeff Morrison (first round)
12. (Germany) Tomas Behrend (first round)
13. (Switzerland) Marc Rosset (first round)
14. (Austria) Alexander Peya (qualified)
15. (Spain) Nicolás Almagro (qualified)
16. (Italy) Stefano Pescosolido (first round)
17. (Belgium) Dick Norman (second round)
18. (Argentina) Franco Squillari (second round)
19. (Czech Republic) Tomáš Zíb (first round)
20. (United States) Glenn Weiner (first round)
21. (Luxembourg) Gilles Müller (second round)
22. (Colombia) Alejandro Falla (qualified)
23. (Argentina) Juan Mónaco (qualified)
24. (United States) Robert Kendrick (qualifying competition)
25. (Australia) Peter Luczak (second round)
26. (Serbia and Montenegro) Janko Tipsarević (qualified)
27. (Italy) Alessio di Mauro (first round)
28. (Brazil) Ricardo Mello (qualified)
29. (Germany) Philipp Kohlschreiber (second round)
30. (Switzerland) Stan Wawrinka (first round)
31. (Germany) Daniel Elsner (qualified)
32. (Croatia) Roko Karanušić (qualifying competition)

== Qualifiers ==
1. (France) Marc Gicquel
2. (Germany) Florian Mayer
3. (France) Jérôme Haehnel
4. (Spain) Guillermo García-López
5. (Argentina) Juan Mónaco
6. (United States) Kevin Kim
7. (Italy) Potito Starace
8. (Serbia and Montenegro) Janko Tipsarević
9. (France) Julien Jeanpierre
10. (Brazil) Ricardo Mello
11. (Germany) Daniel Elsner
12. (Colombia) Alejandro Falla
13. (France) Florent Serra
14. (Austria) Alexander Peya
15. (Spain) Nicolás Almagro
16. (Belarus) Vladimir Voltchkov

== Lucky losers ==
1. (United States) Jeff Salzenstein
2. (Belgium) Kristof Vliegen
3. (Spain) Marc López
4. (South Korea) Lee Hyung-taik

== Qualifying draw ==
Key

- Q = Qualifier
- WC = Wild card
- LL = Lucky loser
- Alt = Alternate
- ITF = ITF entry
- PR = Protected ranking
- SR = Special ranking
- SE = Special exempt
- JE = Junior exempt
- JR = Junior Accelerator Programme entrant
- CO = College Accelerator Programme entrant
- NG = Next Gen Accelerator Program entrant
- w/o = Walkover
- r = Retired
- d = Defaulted

=== First qualifier ===
First round
1	(Spain) Albert Montañés	1	4
(Chile) Julio Peralta	6	6
(France) Marc Gicquel	6	7^{7}
(Spain) Gorka Fraile	2	6^{2}
(Argentina) Sergio Roitman	3	7^{7}	3
(Cyprus) Marcos Baghdatis	6	6^{4}	6
(Chile) Hermes Gamonal	7	4	6
30	(Switzerland) Stan Wawrinka	5	6	1

Second round
(Chile) Julio Peralta	4	6^{6}
(France) Marc Gicquel	6	7^{8}
(Cyprus) Marcos Baghdatis	6	6
(Chile) Hermes Gamonal	3	1

Qualifying competition
(France) Marc Gicquel	6	6
(Cyprus) Marcos Baghdatis	4	1

=== Second qualifier ===
First round
2	(Germany) Florian Mayer	6	6
(Greece) Vasilis Mazarakis	2	2
(Sweden) Björn Rehnquist	1	1
(Germany) Dieter Kindlmann	6	6
WC	(France) Nicolas Renavand	6	3	6
WC	(France) Gilles Simon	3	6	2
WC	(France) Gaël Monfils	4	2
24	(United States) Robert Kendrick	6	6

Second round
2	(Germany) Florian Mayer	7^{7}	6
(Germany) Dieter Kindlmann	6^{0}	3
WC	(France) Nicolas Renavand	2	3
24	(United States) Robert Kendrick	6	6

Qualifying competition
2	(Germany) Florian Mayer	6	7
24	(United States) Robert Kendrick	2	5

=== Third qualifier ===
First round
3	(Chinese Taipei) Lu Yen-hsun	2	6	7
(Mexico) Alejandro Hernández	6	2	5
(Slovakia) Michal Mertiňák	2	6^{5}
(Argentina) Ignacio González King	6	7^{7}
(Argentina) Diego Moyano	6	6
(France) Nicolas Thomann	3	2
(France) Jérôme Haehnel	6	4	6
19	(Czech Republic) Tomáš Zíb	2	6	3

Second round
3	(Chinese Taipei) Lu Yen-hsun	3	2
(Argentina) Ignacio González King	6	6
(Argentina) Diego Moyano	2	6^{4}
(France) Jérôme Haehnel	6	7^{7}

Qualifying competition
(Argentina) Ignacio González King	4	3
(France) Jérôme Haehnel	6	6

=== Fourth qualifier ===
First round
4	(United States) Jeff Salzenstein	4
(United States) Zack Fleishman	1^{r}
(Japan) Takao Suzuki	7	2	4
WC	(France) Jo-Wilfried Tsonga	5	6	6
(Germany) Michael Berrer	3	4
(Spain) Guillermo García-López	6	6
(Chinese Taipei) Jimmy Wang	1	3
25	(Australia) Peter Luczak	6	6

Second round
4	(United States) Jeff Salzenstein	7^{14}	6
WC	(France) Jo-Wilfried Tsonga	6^{12}	3
(Spain) Guillermo García-López	6	6
25	(Australia) Peter Luczak	3	3

Qualifying competition
4	(United States) Jeff Salzenstein	5	0
(Spain) Guillermo García-López	7	6

=== Fifth qualifier ===
First round
5	(Argentina) Martín Vassallo Argüello	6	3	6
(France) Jean-François Bachelot	4	6	3
(Brazil) Franco Ferreiro	6	6
WC	(Algeria) Slimane Saoudi	2	4
(Italy) Uros Vico	5	3
(Switzerland) Marco Chiudinelli	7	6
(Argentina) Gustavo Marcaccio	5	6	3
23	(Argentina) Juan Mónaco	7	0	6

Second round
5	(Argentina) Martín Vassallo Argüello	3	4
(Brazil) Franco Ferreiro	6	6
(Switzerland) Marco Chiudinelli	2	4
23	(Argentina) Juan Mónaco	6	6

Qualifying competition
(Brazil) Franco Ferreiro	3	3
23	(Argentina) Juan Mónaco	6	6

=== Sixth qualifier ===
First round
6	(Belgium) Kristof Vliegen	7	6
WC	(France) Éric Prodon	5	3
(Czech Republic) Jiří Vaněk	6
(Canada) Simon Larose	2^{r}
(United States) Kevin Kim	6	6
(Argentina) Diego Veronelli	4	1
(Chile) Paul Capdeville	4	7^{7}	1
29	(Germany) Philipp Kohlschreiber	6	6^{0}	6

Second round
6	(Belgium) Kristof Vliegen	3	6	6
(Czech Republic) Jiří Vaněk	6	2	4
(United States) Kevin Kim	6^{6}	6	6
29	(Germany) Philipp Kohlschreiber	7^{8}	1	4

Qualifying competition
6	(Belgium) Kristof Vliegen	6	3	2
(United States) Kevin Kim	4	6	6

=== Seventh qualifier ===
First round
7	(Spain) Marc López	6	7
(Brazil) André Sá	1	5
(Peru) Iván Miranda	6	6^{6}	6
(Finland) Tuomas Ketola	1	7^{8}	3
(Italy) Potito Starace	6	6
(Austria) Werner Eschauer	4	1
(Mexico) Miguel Gallardo Valles	7^{7}	7^{7}
27	(Italy) Alessio di Mauro	6^{4}	6^{4}

Second round
7	(Spain) Marc López	6	6
(Peru) Iván Miranda	4	0
(Italy) Potito Starace	6	6
(Mexico) Miguel Gallardo Valles	3	0

Qualifying competition
7	(Spain) Marc López	4	6	5
(Italy) Potito Starace	6	3	7

=== Eighth qualifier ===
First round
8	(Italy) Davide Sanguinetti	5	6	3
(Spain) Juan Albert Viloca	7	1	6
(Serbia and Montenegro) Dušan Vemić	3	6	4
(South Africa) Rik de Voest	6	3	6
(United States) Matías Boeker	6	6
(Israel) Noam Okun	2	4
(Paraguay) Ramón Delgado	4	6	3
26	(Serbia and Montenegro) Janko Tipsarević	6	3	6

Second round
(Spain) Juan Albert Viloca	6^{5r}
(South Africa) Rik de Voest	7^{7}
(United States) Matías Boeker	6^{2}	2
26	(Serbia and Montenegro) Janko Tipsarević	7^{7}	6

Qualifying competition
(South Africa) Rik de Voest	2	2
26	(Serbia and Montenegro) Janko Tipsarević	6	6

=== Ninth qualifier ===
First round
9	(United States) Paul Goldstein	2	6	3
(Argentina) Mariano Delfino	6	1	6
(Bulgaria) Ivaylo Traykov	7^{8}	3	4
(United States) Alex Kim	6^{6}	6	6
(France) Julien Jeanpierre	6	6
(France) Nicolas Coutelot	2	4
PR	(Czech Republic) Jan Hájek	6^{5}	1
21	(Luxembourg) Gilles Müller	7^{7}	6

Second round
(Argentina) Mariano Delfino	6	6
(United States) Alex Kim	2	4
(France) Julien Jeanpierre	7	6
21	(Luxembourg) Gilles Müller	5	3

Qualifying competition
(Argentina) Mariano Delfino	2	6	1
(France) Julien Jeanpierre	6	2	6

=== Tenth qualifier ===
First round
10	(South Korea) Lee Hyung-taik	7	6
(Italy) Stefano Cobolli	5	3
WC	(France) Gary Lugassy	4	3
(Spain) Francisco Fogués	6	6
(Italy) Tomas Tenconi	7	5	6
(Serbia and Montenegro) Boris Pašanski	5	7	0
(Czech Republic) Tomáš Cakl	2	2
28	(Brazil) Ricardo Mello	6	6

Second round
10	(South Korea) Lee Hyung-taik	w/o
(Spain) Francisco Fogués
(Italy) Tomas Tenconi	4	4
28	(Brazil) Ricardo Mello	6	6

Qualifying competition
10	(South Korea) Lee Hyung-taik	5	7^{7}	3
28	(Brazil) Ricardo Mello	7	6^{5}	6

=== Eleventh qualifier ===
First round
11	(United States) Jeff Morrison	4	3
(Argentina) Juan Pablo Brzezicki	6	6
(Austria) Oliver Marach	6	6
(Romania) Răzvan Sabău	2	1
(Norway) Jan Frode Andersen	6	6
(Italy) Leonardo Azzaro	1	2
WC	(France) Laurent Recouderc	6^{5}	5
31	(Germany) Daniel Elsner	7^{7}	7

Second round
(Argentina) Juan Pablo Brzezicki	4	2
(Austria) Oliver Marach	6	6
(Norway) Jan Frode Andersen	0	6	3
31	(Germany) Daniel Elsner	6	2	6

Qualifying competition
(Austria) Oliver Marach	2	3
31	(Germany) Daniel Elsner	6	6

=== Twelfth qualifier ===
First round
12	(Germany) Tomas Behrend	5	6^{5}
(Germany) Markus Hantschk	7	7^{7}
(Spain) Óscar Serrano	2	2
(Italy) Andreas Seppi	6	6
(France) Sébastien De Chaunac	6	3	0
(Netherlands) Peter Wessels	4	6	6
(United States) Eric Taino	3	2
22	(Colombia) Alejandro Falla	6	6

Second round
(Germany) Markus Hantschk	6	3	6
(Italy) Andreas Seppi	4	6	8
(Netherlands) Peter Wessels	6^{4}	4
22	(Colombia) Alejandro Falla	7^{7}	6

Qualifying competition
(Italy) Andreas Seppi	6	3	3
22	(Colombia) Alejandro Falla	3	6	6

=== Thirteenth qualifier ===
First round
13	(Switzerland) Marc Rosset	6	3	3
(France) Florent Serra	3	6	6
(Italy) Vincenzo Santopadre	3	3
(Brazil) Bruno Soares	6	6
(Switzerland) Michel Kratochvil	4	7	3
(Germany) Alexander Waske	6	5	6
(Thailand) Danai Udomchoke	2	6^{5}
18	(Argentina) Franco Squillari	6	7^{7}

Second round
(France) Florent Serra	6	6
(Brazil) Bruno Soares	2	2
(Germany) Alexander Waske	6	6
18	(Argentina) Franco Squillari	3	3

Qualifying competition
(France) Florent Serra	6	7
(Germany) Alexander Waske	4	5

=== Fourteenth qualifier ===
First round
14	(Austria) Alexander Peya	6	6
(Spain) Salvador Navarro	4	4
(France) Nicolas Devilder	5	5
(Italy) Giorgio Galimberti	7	7
(France) Édouard Roger-Vasselin	1	2
(Germany) Björn Phau	6	6
(France) Clément Morel	6^{2}	4
17	(Belgium) Dick Norman	7^{7}	6

Second round
14	(Austria) Alexander Peya	6	0	8
(Italy) Giorgio Galimberti	4	6	6
(Germany) Björn Phau	6	6
17	(Belgium) Dick Norman	4	1

Qualifying competition
14	(Austria) Alexander Peya	6	6
(Germany) Björn Phau	3	0

=== Fifteenth qualifier ===
First round
15	(Spain) Nicolás Almagro	4	6	6
(United States) Cecil Mamiit	6	2	2
(Czech Republic) Petr Kralert	1	6	2
(Italy) Paolo Lorenzi	6	3	6
(Mexico) Santiago González	6	6^{4}	6
PR	(Hungary) Attila Sávolt	4	7^{7}	1
(Italy) Massimo Dell'Acqua	5	5
32	(Croatia) Roko Karanušić	7	7

Second round
15	(Spain) Nicolás Almagro	7	6
(Italy) Paolo Lorenzi	5	1
(Mexico) Santiago González	4	6	2
32	(Croatia) Roko Karanušić	6	1	6

Qualifying competition
15	(Spain) Nicolás Almagro	6	3	6
32	(Croatia) Roko Karanušić	4	6	1

=== Sixteenth qualifier ===
First round
16	(Italy) Stefano Pescosolido	6^{3}	1
(Belarus) Vladimir Voltchkov	7^{7}	6
(Spain) Didac Pérez	6^{3}	2
(Greece) Konstantinos Economidis	7^{7}	6
(France) Jean-Christophe Faurel	7	6
(South Africa) Louis Vosloo	5	1
(Ecuador) Giovanni Lapentti	6	6
20	(United States) Glenn Weiner	2	3

Second round
(Belarus) Vladimir Voltchkov	1	7^{7}	6
(Greece) Konstantinos Economidis	6	6^{1}	2
(France) Jean-Christophe Faurel	0	6	9
(Ecuador) Giovanni Lapentti	6	2	7

Qualifying competition
(Belarus) Vladimir Voltchkov	3	6	6
(France) Jean-Christophe Faurel	6	3	2
