= 2004 French Open =

- Date: 24 May – 6 June 2004
- Edition: 103
- Category: 74th Grand Slam (ITF)
- Surface: Clay
- Location: Paris (XVI^{e}), France
- Venue: Stade Roland Garros

Champions

Men's singles
- (Argentina) Gastón Gaudio

Women's singles
- (Russia) Anastasia Myskina

Men's doubles
- (Belgium) Xavier Malisse / (Belgium) Olivier Rochus

Women's doubles
- (Spain) Virginia Ruano Pascual / (Argentina) Paola Suárez

Mixed doubles
- (France) Tatiana Golovin / (France) Richard Gasquet

Boys' singles
- (France) Gaël Monfils

Girls' singles
- (Bulgaria) Sesil Karatantcheva

Boys' doubles
- (Spain) Pablo Andújar / (Spain) Marcel Granollers

Girls' doubles
- (Czech Republic) Kateřina Böhmová / (Netherlands) Michaëlla Krajicek
- French Open

The 2004 French Open was the 103rd edition of the tournament.

On the men's side, Gastón Gaudio became the first men's major champion in the Open Era to save two championship points in the final. Gaudio also became the first Argentine man since Guillermo Vilas in 1979 to win a major. Fellow Argentine Guillermo Coria, widely regarded as the favourite and the world's best clay court player coming into the tournament, was seeded 3rd for the event, whereas Gaudio was unseeded (ranked 44th). After winning the first two sets convincingly, Coria began suffering from leg cramps. Gaudio won the next two sets; however, Coria came back and was up two breaks of serve in the final set. Coria had two match points at 6–5 before Gaudio prevailed 0–6, 3–6, 6–4, 6–1, 8–6. Gaudio also became the first man to win a Grand Slam tournament final after being bagelled, which occurred in the first set. The overall tournament was noted for the performance of Argentine players – in addition to the two finalists, there were a semifinalist (David Nalbandian) and a quarterfinalist (Juan Ignacio Chela). It was also highlighted by a first round match between Fabrice Santoro and Arnaud Clément, lasting 6 hours and 33 minutes and ending in Clement's defeat 6–4, 6–3, 6–7, 3–6, 16–14, setting a new record for the longest singles match in the Open Era, which would stand until Wimbledon 2010. It was also the last major to feature neither Roger Federer nor Rafael Nadal in the semifinals until the 2012 US Open.

In the women's draw, Anastasia Myskina became first Russian woman to win a major title. The next two majors were also won by Russian women (Maria Sharapova at Wimbledon and Svetlana Kuznetsova at the US Open). She also became the first French Open women's champion after saving a match point en route to the title (against Svetlana Kuznetsova in the fourth round).

In the mixed doubles, French players Tatiana Golovin and Richard Gasquet (aged 16 and 17 respectively) won the tournament after entering as wildcards. France also saw success in the boys' singles, where Gaël Monfils won.

Juan Carlos Ferrero and Justine Henin-Hardenne were both unsuccessful in defending their 2003 titles; both being eliminated in the second round. In Henin's case, her early exit would be the last time a top seed lost within the first two rounds of any major until Ana Ivanovic lost in the second round of the 2008 US Open. Henin's loss to Tathiana Garbin in the second round was her only defeat at the tournament between 2003 and 2009 (not playing in 2008 and 2009).

== Point distribution ==
Below are the tables with the point distribution for each discipline of the tournament.

Event	W	F	SF	QF	Round of 16	Round of 32	Round of 64	Round of 128	Q	Q3	Q2	Q1
Men's singles	1000	700	450	250	150	75	35	5	12	8	4	0
Men's doubles	1000	700	450	250	150	75	0	—N/a	—N/a	—N/a	0	0
Women's singles	650	456	292	162	90	56	32	2	30	21	12.5	4
Women's doubles	650	456	292	162	90	56	0	—N/a	—N/a	—N/a	0	0

== Champions ==
=== Seniors ===
==== Men's singles ====
(Argentina) Gastón Gaudio defeated (Argentina) Guillermo Coria, 0–6, 3–6, 6–4, 6–1, 8–6

- It was Gaudio's 1st title of the year, and his 3rd overall. It was his 1st and only singles Grand Slam title.

==== Women's singles ====
(Russia) Anastasia Myskina defeated (Russia) Elena Dementieva, 6–1, 6–2

- It was Myskina's 2nd title of the year, and her 8th overall. It was her 1st and only singles Grand Slam title.

==== Men's doubles ====
(Belgium) Xavier Malisse / (Belgium) Olivier Rochus defeated (France) Michaël Llodra / (France) Fabrice Santoro, 7–5, 7–5

- It was Malisse and Rochus' 1st career Grand Slam title.

==== Women's doubles ====
(Spain) Virginia Ruano Pascual / (Argentina) Paola Suárez defeated (Russia) Svetlana Kuznetsova / (Russia) Elena Likhovtseva, 6–0, 6–3

==== Mixed doubles ====
(France) Tatiana Golovin / (France) Richard Gasquet defeated (Zimbabwe) Cara Black / (Zimbabwe) Wayne Black, 6–3, 6–4

=== Juniors ===
==== Boys' singles ====
(France) Gaël Monfils defeated (United States) Alex Kuznetsov, 6–2, 6–2

==== Girls' singles ====
(Bulgaria) Sesil Karatantcheva defeated (Romania) Mădălina Gojnea, 6–4, 6–0

==== Boys' doubles ====
(Spain) Pablo Andújar / (Spain) Marcel Granollers defeated (United States) Alex Kuznetsov / (Germany) Mischa Zverev, 6–3, 6–2

==== Girls' doubles ====
(Czech Republic) Kateřina Böhmová / (Netherlands) Michaëlla Krajicek defeated (Russia) Irina Kotkina / (Russia) Yaroslava Shvedova, 6–3, 6–2

== Singles seeds ==
=== Men's singles ===
1. (Switzerland) Roger Federer (third round, lost to Gustavo Kuerten)
2. (United States) Andy Roddick (second round, lost to Olivier Mutis)
3. (Argentina) Guillermo Coria (final, lost to Gastón Gaudio)
4. (Spain) Juan Carlos Ferrero (second round, lost to Igor Andreev)
5. (Spain) Carlos Moyá (quarterfinals, lost to Guillermo Coria)
6. (France) Andre Agassi (first round, lost to Jérôme Haehnel)
7. (Germany) Rainer Schüttler (first round, lost to Xavier Malisse)
8. (Argentina) David Nalbandian (semifinals, lost to Gastón Gaudio)
9. (United Kingdom) Tim Henman (semifinals, lost to Guillermo Coria)
10. (France) Sébastien Grosjean (second round, lost to Potito Starace)
11. (Chile) Nicolás Massú (third round, lost to Tommy Robredo)
12. (Australia) Lleyton Hewitt (quarterfinals, lost to Gastón Gaudio)
13. (Thailand) Paradorn Srichaphan (second round, lost to Àlex Corretja)
14. (Czech Republic) Jiří Novák (second round, lost to Gastón Gaudio)
15. (Netherlands) Sjeng Schalken (withdrew due to viral infection)
16. (Chile) Fernando González (first round, lost to Florian Mayer)
17. (Spain) Tommy Robredo (fourth round, lost to Carlos Moyá)
18. (Australia) Mark Philippoussis (first round, lost to Luis Horna)
19. (Netherlands) Martin Verkerk (third round, lost to Lleyton Hewitt)
20. (Russia) Marat Safin (fourth round, lost to David Nalbandian)
21. (Romania) Andrei Pavel (second round, lost to Mikhail Youzhny)
22. (Argentina) Juan Ignacio Chela (quarterfinals, lost to Tim Henman)
23. (Spain) Feliciano López (fourth round, lost to Gustavo Kuerten)
24. (Sweden) Jonas Björkman (second round, lost to Thomas Enqvist)
25. (Croatia) Ivan Ljubičić (second round, lost to Stefan Koubek)
26. (Spain) Albert Costa (third round, lost to Xavier Malisse)
27. (United States) Vince Spadea (second round, lost to Julien Jeanpierre)
28. (Brazil) Gustavo Kuerten (quarterfinals, lost to David Nalbandian)
29. (Belarus) Max Mirnyi (first round, lost to Julien Benneteau)
30. (Argentina) Mariano Zabaleta (second round, lost to Mario Ančić)
31. (Slovakia) Dominik Hrbatý (second round, lost to Raemon Sluiter)
32. (France) Arnaud Clément (first round, lost to Fabrice Santoro)

=== Women's singles ===
1. (Belgium) Justine Henin-Hardenne (second round, lost to Tathiana Garbin)
2. (United States) Serena Williams (quarterfinals, lost to Jennifer Capriati)
3. (France) Amélie Mauresmo (quarterfinals, lost to Elena Dementieva)
4. (United States) Venus Williams (quarterfinals, lost to Anastasia Myskina)
5. (United States) Lindsay Davenport (fourth round, lost to Elena Dementieva)
6. (Russia) Anastasia Myskina (champion)
7. (United States) Jennifer Capriati (semifinals, lost to Anastasia Myskina)
8. (Russia) Nadia Petrova (third round, lost to Marlene Weingärtner)
9. (Russia) Elena Dementieva (final, lost to Anastasia Myskina)
10. (Russia) Vera Zvonareva (third round, lost to Maria Sharapova)
11. (Russia) Svetlana Kuznetsova (fourth round, lost to Anastasia Myskina)
12. (Japan) Ai Sugiyama (second round, lost to Virginia Ruano Pascual)
13. (United States) Chanda Rubin (withdrew due to knee injury)
14. (Argentina) Paola Suárez (semifinals, lost to Elena Dementieva)
15. (Italy) Silvia Farina Elia (second round, lost to Meghann Shaughnessy)
16. (Switzerland) Patty Schnyder (second round, lost to Shinobu Asagoe)
17. (Italy) Francesca Schiavone (fourth round, lost to Jennifer Capriati)
18. (Russia) Maria Sharapova (quarterfinals, lost to Paola Suárez)
19. (Israel) Anna Smashnova-Pistolesi (third round, lost to Elena Dementieva)
20. (Spain) Conchita Martínez (second round, lost to Gisela Dulko)
21. (Bulgaria) Magdalena Maleeva (fourth round, lost to Amélie Mauresmo)
22. (Croatia) Karolina Šprem (first round, lost to Myriam Casanova)
23. (Colombia) Fabiola Zuluaga (fourth round, lost to Venus Williams)
24. (Serbia and Montenegro) Jelena Dokic (first round, lost to Tatiana Perebiynis)
25. (Russia) Elena Bovina (third round, lost to Jennifer Capriati)
26. (France) Nathalie Dechy (first round, lost to Stéphanie Foretz)
27. (Greece) Eleni Daniilidou (first round, lost to Marlene Weingärtner)
28. (United States) Lisa Raymond (second round, lost to Arantxa Parra Santonja)
29. (Hungary) Petra Mandula (second round, lost to Denisa Chládková)
30. (France) Mary Pierce (third round, lost to Venus Williams)
31. (France) Émilie Loit (first round, lost to Zheng Jie)
32. (Russia) Dinara Safina (second round, lost to Marissa Irvin)

== Wildcard entries ==
Below are the lists of the wildcard awardees entering in the main draws.

=== Men's singles wildcard entries ===
1. (France) Julien Boutter
2. (France) Arnaud Di Pasquale
3. (France) Jean-René Lisnard
4. (France) Michaël Llodra
5. (France) Nicolas Mahut
6. (France) Olivier Patience
7. (Australia) Todd Reid
8. (France) Stéphane Robert

=== Women's singles wildcard entries ===
1. (France) Séverine Beltrame
2. (France) Stéphanie Foretz
3. (United States) Martina Navratilova
4. (France) Virginie Pichet
5. (France) Camille Pin
6. (France) Virginie Razzano
7. (France) Sandrine Testud
8. (Australia) Christina Wheeler

=== Men's doubles wildcard entries ===
1. (Russia) Igor Andreev / (Russia) Nikolay Davydenko
2. (France) Thierry Ascione / (France) Jean-François Bachelot
3. (France) Julien Boutter / (France) Antony Dupuis
4. (France) Sébastien de Chaunac / (France) Stéphane Robert
5. (France) Jérôme Haehnel / (France) Florent Serra
6. (France) Julien Jeanpierre / (France) Édouard Roger-Vasselin
7. (France) Olivier Mutis / (France) Olivier Patience

=== Women's doubles wildcard entries ===
1. (France) Séverine Beltrame / (France) Camille Pin
2. (France) Kildine Chevalier / (France) Sophie Lefèvre
3. (France) Stéphanie Cohen-Aloro / (Luxembourg) Claudine Schaul
4. (France) Stéphanie Foretz / (France) Virginie Razzano
5. (Spain) Anabel Medina Garrigues / (Spain) Arantxa Sánchez Vicario
6. (France) Pauline Parmentier / (France) Aurélie Védy
7. (France) Virginie Pichet / (France) Capucine Rousseau

=== Mixed doubles wildcard entries ===
1. (France) Séverine Beltrame / (France) Michaël Llodra
2. (France) Stéphanie Cohen-Aloro / (France) Jean-François Bachelot
3. (France) Tatiana Golovin / (France) Richard Gasquet (champions)
4. (France) Camille Pin / (France) Arnaud Clément
5. (France) ~~Virginie Razzano~~ / (France) ~~Julien Boutter~~ (withdrew)
6. (Spain) Arantxa Sánchez Vicario / (Canada) Daniel Nestor

== Qualifier entries ==
=== Men's qualifiers entries ===
1. (France) Marc Gicquel
2. (Germany) Florian Mayer
3. (France) Jérôme Haehnel
4. (Spain) Guillermo García López
5. (Argentina) Juan Mónaco
6. (United States) Kevin Kim
7. (Italy) Potito Starace
8. (Serbia and Montenegro) Janko Tipsarević
9. (France) Julien Jeanpierre
10. (Brazil) Ricardo Mello
11. (Germany) Daniel Elsner
12. (Colombia) Alejandro Falla
13. (France) Florent Serra
14. (Austria) Alexander Peya
15. (Spain) Nicolás Almagro
16. (Belarus) Vladimir Voltchkov

Lucky losers

1. (United States) Jeff Salzenstein
2. (Belgium) Kristof Vliegen
3. (Spain) Marc López
4. (South Korea) Lee Hyung-taik

=== Women's qualifiers entries ===
1. (United States) Marissa Irvin
2. (United States) Shenay Perry
3. (United States) Teryn Ashley
4. (Italy) Roberta Vinci
5. (Bulgaria) Lubomira Bacheva
6. (Slovakia) Zuzana Kucová
7. (Germany) Julia Schruff
8. (Croatia) Sanda Mamić
9. (Czech Republic) Květa Peschke
10. (Ukraine) Yuliana Fedak
11. (Germany) Barbara Rittner
12. (United States) Kelly McCain

Lucky losers

1. (Czech Republic) Eva Birnerová
2. (Israel) Tzipora Obziler

== Protected ranking ==
=== Men's singles ===
- (Germany) Tommy Haas
- (Denmark) Kristian Pless
- (Czech Republic) Bohdan Ulihrach

=== Women's singles ===
- (Argentina) Mariana Díaz Oliva
- (Austria) Barbara Schwartz

== Withdrawals ==
Men's Singles

- (Argentina) José Acasuso → replaced by (Belgium) Kristof Vliegen
- (United States) James Blake → replaced by (Belgium) Christophe Rochus
- (France) Grégory Carraz → replaced by (Spain) Marc López
- (Morocco) Younes El Aynaoui → replaced by (Israel) Harel Levy
- (United States) Mardy Fish → replaced by (United Kingdom) Greg Rusedski
- (Croatia) Goran Ivanišević → replaced by (United States) Jeff Salzenstein
- (Russia) Yevgeny Kafelnikov → replaced by (Spain) Àlex Corretja
- (France) Paul-Henri Mathieu → replaced by (Denmark) Kristian Pless
- (Spain) Rafael Nadal → replaced by (United States) Alex Bogomolov Jr.
- (Finland) Jarkko Nieminen → replaced by (Australia) Wayne Arthurs
- (Netherlands) Sjeng Schalken → replaced by (South Korea) Lee Hyung-taik

Women's Singles

- (Belgium) Kim Clijsters → replaced by (Colombia) Catalina Castaño
- (South Africa) Amanda Coetzer → replaced by (Russia) Alina Jidkova
- (Luxembourg) Anne Kremer → replaced by (Czech Republic) Eva Birnerová
- (Russia) Lina Krasnoroutskaya → replaced by (Russia) Maria Kirilenko
- (United States) Chanda Rubin → replaced by (Israel) Tzipora Obziler
- (Uzbekistan) Iroda Tulyaganova → replaced by (Madagascar) Dally Randriantefy

Preceded by 2004 Australian Open	Grand Slams	Succeeded by 2004 Wimbledon Championships
