= Stephanie Gehrlein =

German tennis player

- Country (sports): Germany
- Born: 10 April 1982 (age 42); Karlsruhe, West Germany
- Turned pro: 1999
- Retired: 2010
- Prize money: $195,711

Singles
- Career record: 208–175
- Career titles: 0 WTA, 7 ITF
- Highest ranking: No. 121 (14 June 2004)

Grand Slam singles results
- Australian Open: Q3 (2004, 2006)
- French Open: Q3 (2004)
- Wimbledon: Q2 (2005)
- US Open: 1R (2003)

Doubles
- Career record: 7–20
- Career titles: 0
- Highest ranking: No. 544 (23 October 2000)

Stephanie Gehrlein (born 10 April 1982) is a retired German tennis player.

Gehrlein won seven singles titles on the ITF Circuit in her career. On 14 June 2004, she reached her best singles ranking of world No. 121. On 23 October 2000, she peaked at No. 544 in the WTA doubles rankings.

Gehrlein retired from professional tennis 2010.

== ITF finals ==
=== Singles (7–3) ===
Legend $100,000 tournaments $75,000 tournaments $50,000 tournaments $25,000 tournaments $10,000 tournaments	Finals by surface Hard (2–1) Clay (0–3) Grass (0–0) Carpet (1–1)

Result	Date	Tier	Tournament	Surface	Opponent	Score
Loss	25 September 2000	10,000	Glasgow, United Kingdom	Hard (i)	(Germany) Susi Bensch	6–4, 2–6, 3–6
Loss	7 July 2002	25,000	Stuttgart, Germany	Clay	(Luxembourg) Claudine Schaul	3–6, 6–3, 4–6
Win	9 June 2003	25,000	Vaduz, Liechtenstein	Clay	(Italy) Nathalie Viérin	6–3, 6–1
Loss	9 May 2005	50,000	Saint-Gaudens, France	Clay	(France) Aravane Rezaï	4–6, 6–2, 2–6
Win	2 July 2007	25,000	Stuttgart, Germany	Clay	(Germany) Carmen Klaschka	6–3, 7–6^{(9–7)}
Win	10 July 2007	25,000	Darmstadt, Germany	Clay	(Germany) Julia Görges	6–0, 7–5
Win	16 June 2008	25,000	Istanbul, Turkey	Hard	(Russia) Arina Rodionova	6–2, 6–3
Win	30 July 2008	25,000	Stuttgart, Germany	Clay	(Ukraine) Yevgenia Savranska	6–0, 6–2
Win	1 September 2008	25,000	Alphen a/d Rijn, Netherlands	Clay	(Argentina) Florencia Molinero	7–6^{(7–0)}, 6–0
Win	8 June 2009	25,000	Szczecin, Poland	Clay	(Czech Republic) Andrea Hlaváčková	6–4, 6–0
