= 2004 French Open – Women's singles =

Women's singles
- 2004 French Open

Final
- Champion: (Russia) Anastasia Myskina
- Runner-up: (Russia) Elena Dementieva
- Score: 6–1, 6–2

Details
- Seeds: 32

Events
Singles	men	women		boys	girls
Doubles	men	women	mixed	boys	girls
WC Singles	men	women	quad
WC Doubles	men	women	quad
Legends	−45	45+	women
← 2003 ·	French Open	· 2005 →

Anastasia Myskina defeated Elena Dementieva in the final, 6–1, 6–2 to win the women's singles tennis title at the 2004 French Open. It was her first and only major title, becoming the first Russian woman to win a singles major. Myskina saved a match point en route to the title, in the fourth round against Svetlana Kuznetsova. This marked the first major final contested by two first-time finalists since the 1979 Australian Open. The final also made Russia the fourth country in the Open Era (following Australia, the United States, and Belgium) to have two countrywomen contest a major final.

Justine Henin-Hardenne was the defending champion, but lost in the second round to Tathiana Garbin. This was her only loss at the French Open between 2003 and 2007.

Martina Navratilova played in her first singles major since the 1994 Wimbledon Championships, being unseeded for the first time since the 1973 US Open. Awarded a wild card, she made her final French Open singles appearance; she lost in the first round to Gisela Dulko.

== Seeds ==
1. (Belgium) Justine Henin-Hardenne (second round)
2. (United States) Serena Williams (quarterfinals)
3. (France) Amélie Mauresmo (quarterfinals)
4. (United States) Venus Williams (quarterfinals)
5. (United States) Lindsay Davenport (fourth round)
6. (Russia) Anastasia Myskina (champion)
7. (United States) Jennifer Capriati (semifinals)
8. (Russia) Nadia Petrova (third round)
9. (Russia) Elena Dementieva (final)
10. (Russia) Vera Zvonareva (third round)
11. (Russia) Svetlana Kuznetsova (fourth round)
12. (Japan) Ai Sugiyama (second round)
13. (United States) Chanda Rubin (withdrew)
14. (Argentina) Paola Suárez (semifinals)
15. (Italy) Silvia Farina Elia (second round)
16. (Switzerland) Patty Schnyder (second round)
17. (Italy) Francesca Schiavone (fourth round)
18. (Russia) Maria Sharapova (quarterfinals)
19. (Israel) Anna Smashnova-Pistolesi (third round)
20. (Spain) Conchita Martínez (second round)
21. (Bulgaria) Magdalena Maleeva (fourth round)
22. (Croatia) Karolina Šprem (first round)
23. (Colombia) Fabiola Zuluaga (fourth round)
24. (Serbia and Montenegro) Jelena Dokić (first round)
25. (Russia) Elena Bovina (third round)
26. (France) Nathalie Dechy (first round)
27. (Greece) Eleni Daniilidou (first round)
28. (United States) Lisa Raymond (second round)
29. (Hungary) Petra Mandula (second round)
30. (France) Mary Pierce (third round)
31. (France) Émilie Loit (second round)
32. (Russia) Dinara Safina (second round)

== Draw ==
=== Key ===
- Q = Qualifier
- WC = Wild card
- LL = Lucky loser
- Alt = Alternate
- ITF = ITF entry
- PR = Protected ranking
- SR = Special ranking
- SE = Special exempt
- JE = Junior exempt
- JR = Junior Accelerator Programme entrant
- CO = College Accelerator Programme entrant
- NG = Next Gen Accelerator Program entrant
- w/o = Walkover
- r = Retired
- d = Defaulted

=== Finals ===
Quarterfinals
14	(Argentina) Paola Suárez	6	6
18	(Russia) Maria Sharapova	1	3
3	(France) Amélie Mauresmo	4	3
9	(Russia) Elena Dementieva	6	6
6	(Russia) Anastasia Myskina	6	6
4	(United States) Venus Williams	3	4
7	(United States) Jennifer Capriati	6	2	6
2	(United States) Serena Williams	3	6	3

Semifinals
14	(Argentina) Paola Suárez	0	5
9	(Russia) Elena Dementieva	6	7
6	(Russia) Anastasia Myskina	6	6
7	(United States) Jennifer Capriati	2	2

Final
9	(Russia) Elena Dementieva	1	2
6	(Russia) Anastasia Myskina	6	6

=== Top half ===
==== Section 1 ====
First round
1	(Belgium) J Henin-Hardenne	6	6
WC	(France) S Testud	4	4
(Italy) T Garbin	6	6
(Spain) C Martínez Granados	1	2
(Madagascar) D Randriantefy	1	7	4
(China) J Zheng	6	5	6
(Czech Republic) S Kleinová	4	4
31	(France) É Loit	6	6
24	(Serbia and Montenegro) J Dokić	4	1
(Ukraine) T Perebiynis	6	6
(United States) A Harkleroad	6	6
PR	(Argentina) M Díaz Oliva	2	1
(Japan) S Obata	1	7	4
(Russia) V Dushevina	6	5	6
(Venezuela) M Sequera	3	4
14	(Argentina) P Suárez	6	6

Second round
1	(Belgium) J Henin-Hardenne	5	4
(Italy) T Garbin	7	6
(China) J Zheng	6	6
31	(France) É Loit	4	1
(Ukraine) T Perebiynis	6	6
(United States) A Harkleroad	1	3
(Russia) V Dushevina	1	4
14	(Argentina) P Suárez	6	6

Third round
(Italy) T Garbin	7	6^{1}	2
(China) J Zheng	5	7^{7}	6
(Ukraine) T Perebiynis	3	3
14	(Argentina) P Suárez	6	6

Fourth round
(China) J Zheng	4	5
14	(Argentina) P Suárez	6	7

==== Section 2 ====
First round
10	(Russia) V Zvonareva	6	6
Q	(Slovakia) Z Kučová	0	2
(Spain) M Serna	6	3	8
(Japan) A Morigami	3	6	6
(Italy) R Grande	7^{9}	6
(Slovakia) H Nagyová	6^{7}	1
PR	(Austria) B Schwartz	3	0
18	(Russia) M Sharapova	6	6
27	(Greece) E Daniilidou	3	3
(Germany) M Weingärtner	6	6
(United States) A Frazier	3	2
(Italy) ME Camerin	6	6
Q	(Ukraine) J Fedak	6	6
(Italy) M Santangelo	3	1
(Colombia) C Castaño	2	3
8	(Russia) N Petrova	6	6

Second round
10	(Russia) V Zvonareva	5	6	6
(Spain) M Serna	7	1	4
(Italy) R Grande	2	0
18	(Russia) M Sharapova	6	6
(Germany) M Weingärtner	4	6	6
(Italy) ME Camerin	6	4	4
Q	(Ukraine) J Fedak	0	1
8	(Russia) N Petrova	6	6

Third round
10	(Russia) V Zvonareva	3	6^{3}
18	(Russia) M Sharapova	6	7^{7}
(Germany) M Weingärtner	6	6
8	(Russia) N Petrova	3	2

Fourth round
18	(Russia) M Sharapova	6	6
(Germany) M Weingärtner	3	1

==== Section 3 ====
First round
3	(France) A Mauresmo	6	6
(Slovakia) Ľ Cervanová	3	3
(United States) J Craybas	2	1
(Spain) A Medina Garrigues	6	6
(Ukraine) J Vakulenko	5	2
(Spain) A Parra Santonja	7	6
(Slovakia) Ľ Kurhajcová	6	5	3
28	(United States) L Raymond	0	7	6
21	(Bulgaria) M Maleeva	6	6
(Germany) A Barna	2	2
WC	(Australia) C Wheeler	2	6	7
(Spain) M Marrero	6	4	9
(United States) S Reeves	4	3
(United States) M Shaughnessy	6	6
(Serbia and Montenegro) J Janković	6	0	2
15	(Italy) S Farina Elia	4	6	6

Second round
3	(France) A Mauresmo	6	4	6
(Spain) A Medina Garrigues	0	6	1
(Spain) A Parra Santonja	6	6
28	(United States) L Raymond	4	0
21	(Bulgaria) M Maleeva	7	6^{3}	7
(Spain) M Marrero	5	7^{7}	5
(United States) M Shaughnessy	6	3	9
15	(Italy) S Farina Elia	3	6	7

Third round
3	(France) A Mauresmo	6	6
(Spain) A Parra Santonja	3	2
21	(Bulgaria) M Maleeva	6	7^{7}
(United States) M Shaughnessy	3	6^{3}

Fourth round
3	(France) A Mauresmo	6	6
21	(Bulgaria) M Maleeva	2	1

==== Section 4 ====
First round
9	(Russia) E Dementieva	7^{7}	1	6
(Bosnia and Herzegovina) M Jugić-Salkić	6^{4}	6	4
(Australia) N Pratt	6	6
(Slovenia) T Pisnik	4	2
(Czech Republic) K Koukalová	7^{7}	7^{7}
(France) T Golovin	6^{4}	6^{2}
(Italy) F Pennetta	1	4
19	(Israel) A Smashnova-Pistolesi	6	6
32	(Russia) D Safina	7	6^{4}	6
Q	(Germany) J Schruff	5	7^{7}	3
(United States) T Snyder	2	0
Q	(United States) M Irvin	6	6
(Spain) M Sánchez Lorenzo	6	7
Q	(Croatia) S Mamić	4	5
WC	(France) V Pichet	4	2
5	(United States) L Davenport	6	6

Second round
9	(Russia) E Dementieva	6	6
(Australia) N Pratt	2	2
(Czech Republic) K Koukalová	1	5
19	(Israel) A Smashnova-Pistolesi	6	7
32	(Russia) D Safina	6^{5}	2
Q	(United States) M Irvin	7^{7}	6
(Spain) M Sánchez Lorenzo	4	1
5	(United States) L Davenport	6	6

Third round
9	(Russia) E Dementieva	0	7^{7}	0
19	(Israel) A Smashnova-Pistolesi	6	6^{2}	1^{r}
Q	(United States) M Irvin	1	4
5	(United States) L Davenport	6	6

Fourth round
9	(Russia) E Dementieva	6	6
5	(United States) L Davenport	1	3

=== Bottom half ===
==== Section 5 ====
First round
6	(Russia) A Myskina	4	6	6
(Australia) A Molik	6	3	4
(Czech Republic) B Strýcová	6	6
(Belgium) E Callens	3	2
(Czech Republic) D Chládková	6	6
WC	(France) S Beltrame	4	3
Q	(United States) K McCain	7	4	1
29	(Hungary) P Mandula	5	6	6
22	(Croatia) K Šprem	5	2
(Switzerland) M Casanova	7	6
(Venezuela) M Vento-Kabchi	6	6
(United States) L Lee-Waters	4	2
(Austria) B Schett	3	3
Q	(Germany) B Rittner	6	6
Q	(Bulgaria) L Bacheva	0	6^{2}
11	(Russia) S Kuznetsova	6	7^{7}

Second round
6	(Russia) A Myskina	6	6
(Czech Republic) B Strýcová	0	4
(Czech Republic) D Chládková	6	6
29	(Hungary) P Mandula	2	3
(Switzerland) M Casanova	6	2	6
(Venezuela) M Vento-Kabchi	4	6	3
Q	(Germany) B Rittner	1	4
11	(Russia) S Kuznetsova	6	6

Third round
6	(Russia) A Myskina	6	7^{7}
(Czech Republic) D Chládková	3	6^{3}
(Switzerland) M Casanova	6	3	4
11	(Russia) S Kuznetsova	3	6	6

Fourth round
6	(Russia) A Myskina	1	6	8
11	(Russia) S Kuznetsova	6	4	6

==== Section 6 ====
First round
LL	(Israel) T Obziler	4	3
Q	(United States) S Perry	6	6
(Slovenia) K Srebotnik	6	6
(Zimbabwe) C Black	3	3
(Russia) E Likhovtseva	6	1	7
(Russia) A Jidkova	2	6	5
(Slovakia) M Suchá	2	1
23	(Colombia) F Zuluaga	6	6
30	(France) M Pierce	6	6
(Luxembourg) C Schaul	2	3
(United States) L Granville	4	1
(Spain) G León García	6	6
(Croatia) J Kostanić	6	6
WC	(France) C Pin	4	3
(Thailand) T Tanasugarn	2	4
4	(United States) V Williams	6	6

Second round
Q	(United States) S Perry	4	3
(Slovenia) K Srebotnik	6	6
(Russia) E Likhovtseva	5	7	1
23	(Colombia) F Zuluaga	7	5	6
30	(France) M Pierce	6	6
(Spain) G León García	1	1
(Croatia) J Kostanić	3	3
4	(United States) V Williams	6	6

Third round
(Slovenia) K Srebotnik	7	2	3
23	(Colombia) F Zuluaga	5	6	6
30	(France) M Pierce	3	1
4	(United States) V Williams	6	6

Fourth round
23	(Colombia) F Zuluaga	1	6^{3}
4	(United States) V Williams	6	7^{7}

==== Section 7 ====
First round
7	(United States) J Capriati	6	4	6
(Ukraine) Y Beygelzimer	2	6	4
LL	(Czech Republic) E Birnerová	6^{5}	0
Q	(Czech Republic) K Peschke	7^{7}	6
(Germany) A-L Grönefeld	6	6
(Australia) S Stosur	2	0
Q	(Italy) R Vinci	5	1
25	(Russia) E Bovina	7	6
17	(Italy) F Schiavone	6	6
(France) S Cohen-Aloro	1	2
(Puerto Rico) K Brandi	3	6^{4}
WC	(France) V Razzano	6	7^{7}
(Spain) V Ruano Pascual	6	6
(Hungary) M Czink	4	2
(France) M Bartoli	4	3
12	(Japan) A Sugiyama	6	6

Second round
7	(United States) J Capriati	7	6
Q	(Czech Republic) K Peschke	5	3
(Germany) A-L Grönefeld	2^{r}
25	(Russia) E Bovina	3
17	(Italy) F Schiavone	6	4	6
WC	(France) V Razzano	1	6	3
(Spain) V Ruano Pascual	6^{4}	6	6
12	(Japan) A Sugiyama	7^{7}	2	1

Third round
7	(United States) J Capriati	6	3	6
25	(Russia) E Bovina	2	6	4
17	(Italy) F Schiavone	6	6
(Spain) V Ruano Pascual	2	3

Fourth round
7	(United States) J Capriati	7	6
17	(Italy) F Schiavone	5	1

==== Section 8 ====
First round
16	(Switzerland) P Schnyder	6	6
(Hungary) A Kapros	4	1
(Japan) S Asagoe	6	6
(Slovakia) D Hantuchová	1	3
(Argentina) G Dulko	6	6
WC	(United States) M Navratilova	1	3
Q	(United States) T Ashley	2	4
20	(Spain) C Martínez	6	6
26	(France) N Dechy	6	5	1
WC	(France) S Foretz	1	7	6
(Croatia) S Talaja	6	6
(Switzerland) E Gagliardi	3	4
(Switzerland) M-G Mikaelian	5	6^{5}
(Russia) M Kirilenko	7	7^{7}
(Czech Republic) I Benešová	2	2
2	(United States) S Williams	6	6

Second round
16	(Switzerland) P Schnyder	5	6	4
(Japan) S Asagoe	7	3	6
(Argentina) G Dulko	6	7
20	(Spain) C Martínez	4	5
WC	(France) S Foretz	6	6^{8}	2
(Croatia) S Talaja	2	7^{10}	6
(Russia) M Kirilenko	6	2	4
2	(United States) S Williams	4	6	6

Third round
(Japan) S Asagoe	7	4	6
(Argentina) G Dulko	5	6	4
(Croatia) S Talaja	0	4
2	(United States) S Williams	6	6

Fourth round
(Japan) S Asagoe	3	1
2	(United States) S Williams	6	6

== Championship match statistics ==
Category	(Russia) Myskina	(Russia) Dementieva
1st serve %	35/56 (63%)	21/45 (47%)
1st serve points won	26 of 35 = 74%	11 of 21 = 52%
2nd serve points won	10 of 21 = 48%	8 of 24 = 33%
Total service points won	36 of 56 = 64.29%	19 of 45 = 42.22%
Aces	0	1
Double faults	5	10
Winners	26	11
Unforced errors	17	33
Net points won	2 of 3 = 67%	5 of 9 = 56%
Break points converted	5 of 8 = 63%	1 of 3 = 33%
Return points won	26 of 45 = 58%	20 of 56 = 36%
Total points won	62	39

Preceded by 2004 Australian Open – Women's singles	Grand Slam women's singles	Succeeded by 2004 Wimbledon Championships – Women's singles
