= Kelly McCain =

American tennis player (born 1983)

- Full name: Kelly Monaghan McCain
- Country (sports): United States
- Born: March 18, 1983 (age 42) Springfield, Illinois, U.S.
- Plays: Right-handed
- Prize money: $119,999

Singles
- Highest ranking: No. 117 (October 25, 2004)

Grand Slam singles results
- French Open: 1R (2004)
- US Open: 1R (2004)

Doubles
- Highest ranking: No. 121 (April 11, 2005)

Grand Slam doubles results
- US Open: 1R (2004)

Kelly Monaghan McCain-Parker (born March 18, 1983) is a former professional tennis player from the United States.

== Biography ==
=== Early life ===
Born in the Illinois capital of Springfield, McCain is the daughter of David McCain, a tennis coach who introduced her to the sport at age eight. The family moved to Florida and she went to Saddlebrook High School.

=== Tennis career ===
McCain, a right-handed base-liner, played Junior Davis Cup tennis for the United States.

While at Duke University she played NCAA tennis and was a two-time All-American.

In 2004, she made the main draw of two WTA Tour tournaments. At the 2004 Family Circle Cup in Charleston, she entered as a wildcard and lost to Serena Williams in the second round, having earlier beaten Arantxa Parra Santonja. She played as a qualifier at the 2004 DFS Classic in Birmingham and upset 11th seed Tina Pisnik in the first round, before losing the next match to Saori Obata.

Both of her grand slam appearances came in 2004, at the French Open and US Open. Each time she came up against a seeded player in the first round, Petra Mandula at the French Open, who she took to three sets, and Amy Frazier at the US Open, in a two set loss.

Following the 2004 US Open, she won a $25,000 ITF tournament in Tunica Resorts and finished runner up at the $50,000 Cary, North Carolina event, to reach her highest ranking of 117 in the world.

She was a doubles quarter-finalist at the Advanta Championships of Philadelphia in 2004 and the 2005 Cellular South Cup in Memphis, as well as competing in the singles draws at both.

Her professional career included singles wins over Jelena Jankovic and Flavia Pennetta, the latter in the qualifying draw for the 2005 Medibank International.

=== Personal life ===
McCain married husband Michael Parker in September 2007. In the same year, she was appointed as an assistant coach for the Duke University women's tennis team.
