= 2004 French Open – Mixed doubles =

Mixed doubles
- 2004 French Open

Final
- Champion: (France) Tatiana Golovin (France) Richard Gasquet
- Runner-up: (Zimbabwe) Cara Black (Zimbabwe) Wayne Black
- Score: 6–3, 6–4

Details
- Draw: 32
- Seeds: 8

Events
| Singles | men | women | | boys | girls |
| Doubles | men | women | mixed | boys | girls |
| WC Singles | men | women | quad |
| WC Doubles | men | women | quad |
| Legends | −45 | 45+ | women |
- French Open

Defending champions Lisa Raymond and Mike Bryan lost in the first round to Arantxa Sánchez Vicario and Daniel Nestor.

Tatiana Golovin and Richard Gasquet won the title, defeating Cara Black and Wayne Black in the final.

== Seeds ==
1. (Russia) Elena Likhovtseva / (India) Mahesh Bhupathi (first round)
2. (Spain) Virginia Ruano Pascual / (The Bahamas) Mark Knowles (second round)
3. (United States) Lisa Raymond / (United States) Mike Bryan (first round)
4. (Zimbabwe) Cara Black / (Zimbabwe) Wayne Black (final)
5. (Australia) Rennae Stubbs / (Zimbabwe) Kevin Ullyett (second round)
6. (United States) Martina Navratilova / (India) Leander Paes (second round)
7. (Australia) Alicia Molik / (Australia) Paul Hanley (quarterfinals)
8. (Switzerland) Myriam Casanova / (Czech Republic) Cyril Suk (first round)

== Draw ==
Key

- Q = Qualifier
- WC = Wild card
- LL = Lucky loser
- Alt = Alternate
- ITF = ITF entry
- PR = Protected ranking
- SR = Special ranking
- SE = Special exempt
- JE = Junior exempt
- JR = Junior Accelerator Programme entrant
- CO = College Accelerator Programme entrant
- NG = Next Gen Accelerator Program entrant
- w/o = Walkover
- r = Retired
- d = Defaulted

=== Finals ===
Semifinals
(Slovakia) Daniela Hantuchová (Australia) Todd Woodbridge | 2 | 0
4 | (Zimbabwe) Cara Black (Zimbabwe) Wayne Black | 6 | 6
(Russia) Elena Bovina (Serbia and Montenegro) Nenad Zimonjić | 5 | 6 | 1
WC | (France) Tatiana Golovin (France) Richard Gasquet | 7 | 3 | 6

Final
4 | (Zimbabwe) Cara Black (Zimbabwe) Wayne Black | 3 | 4
WC | (France) Tatiana Golovin (France) Richard Gasquet | 6 | 6

=== Top half ===
First round
1 | (Russia) E Likhovtseva (India) M Bhupathi | 5 | 3
(Belgium) E Callens (Argentina) S Prieto | 7 | 6
(Hungary) P Mandula (Israel) A Ram | 6 | 6^{2} | 6
(Slovakia) J Husárová (Czech Republic) L Friedl | 4 | 7^{7} | 3
Alt | (Croatia) J Kostanić (Belgium) T Vanhoudt | 4 | 0
(France) S Testud (Czech Republic) P Vízner | 6 | 6
(Slovakia) D Hantuchová (Australia) T Woodbridge | 7^{7} | 6
8 | (Switzerland) M Casanova (Czech Republic) C Suk | 6^{5} | 2
4 | (Zimbabwe) C Black (Zimbabwe) W Black | 7^{7} | 6
(Israel) A Smashnova-Pistolesi (Italy) M Bertolini | 6^{4} | 2
(Spain) M Sánchez Lorenzo (Spain) F López | 6 | 6
Alt | (China) T Sun (Czech Republic) P Pála | 3 | 1
Alt | (Australia) L McShea (Australia) J Kerr | 1 | 3
WC | (France) S Beltrame (France) M Llodra | 6 | 6
WC | (France) C Pin (France) A Clément | 3 | 4
7 | (Australia) A Molik (Australia) P Hanley | 6 | 6

Second round
(Belgium) E Callens (Argentina) S Prieto | 7 | 4 | 3
(Hungary) P Mandula (Israel) A Ram | 5 | 6 | 6
(France) S Testud (Czech Republic) P Vízner | 1 | 4
(Slovakia) D Hantuchová (Australia) T Woodbridge | 6 | 6
4 | (Zimbabwe) C Black (Zimbabwe) W Black | 6 | 6
(Spain) M Sánchez Lorenzo (Spain) F López | 3 | 2
WC | (France) S Beltrame (France) M Llodra
7 | (Australia) A Molik (Australia) P Hanley | w/o

Quarterfinals
(Hungary) P Mandula (Israel) A Ram | 3 | 4
(Slovakia) D Hantuchová (Australia) T Woodbridge | 6 | 6
4 | (Zimbabwe) C Black (Zimbabwe) W Black | 6 | 6
7 | (Australia) A Molik (Australia) P Hanley | 2 | 4

Semifinals
(Slovakia) D Hantuchová (Australia) T Woodbridge | 2 | 0
4 | (Zimbabwe) C Black (Zimbabwe) W Black | 6 | 6

=== Bottom half ===
First round
5 | (Australia) R Stubbs (Zimbabwe) K Ullyett | 6 | 3 | 6
(France) M Bartoli (Argentina) G Etlis | 0 | 6 | 2
(Slovenia) K Srebotnik (United States) B Bryan | 6 | 6
WC | (France) S Cohen-Aloro (France) J-F Bachelot | 1 | 4
(Russia) E Bovina (Serbia and Montenegro) N Zimonjić | 6 | 6
(Estonia) M Ani (Czech Republic) M Damm | 2 | 3
WC | (Spain) A Sánchez Vicario (Canada) D Nestor | 6 | 7
3 | (United States) L Raymond (United States) M Bryan | 2 | 5
6 | (United States) M Navratilova (India) L Paes | 6 | 6
(Spain) M Serna (Argentina) M Rodríguez | 3 | 2
(France) É Loit (South Africa) C Haggard | 0 | 2
(Indonesia) A Widjaja (Argentina) L Arnold Ker | 6 | 6
(Venezuela) M Vento-Kabchi (Argentina) M Hood | 1 | 6^{6}
WC | (France) T Golovin (France) R Gasquet | 6 | 7^{7}
(South Africa) L Huber (Israel) J Erlich | 3 | 4
2 | (Spain) V Ruano Pascual (The Bahamas) M Knowles | 6 | 6

Second round
5 | (Australia) R Stubbs (Zimbabwe) K Ullyett | 6^{3} | 5
(Slovenia) K Srebotnik (United States) B Bryan | 7^{7} | 7
(Russia) E Bovina (Serbia and Montenegro) N Zimonjić | 7^{7} | 6
WC | (Spain) A Sánchez Vicario (Canada) D Nestor | 6^{3} | 3
6 | (United States) M Navratilova (India) L Paes | 5 | 5
(Indonesia) A Widjaja (Argentina) L Arnold Ker | 7 | 7
WC | (France) T Golovin (France) R Gasquet | 7 | 6
2 | (Spain) V Ruano Pascual (The Bahamas) M Knowles | 5 | 3

Quarterfinals
(Slovenia) K Srebotnik (United States) B Bryan | 6 | 5 | 5
(Russia) E Bovina (Serbia and Montenegro) N Zimonjić | 3 | 7 | 7
(Indonesia) A Widjaja (Argentina) L Arnold Ker | 2 | 2
WC | (France) T Golovin (France) R Gasquet | 6 | 6

Semifinals
(Russia) E Bovina (Serbia and Montenegro) N Zimonjić | 5 | 6 | 1
WC | (France) T Golovin (France) R Gasquet | 7 | 3 | 6
