= Capucine Rousseau =

French tennis player (born 1980)

- Country (sports): France
- Born: 21 April 1980 (age 46) Croix, France
- Plays: Right-handed
- Prize money: $97,050

Singles
- Career record: 149–107
- Career titles: 3 ITF
- Highest ranking: No. 118 (1 November 2004)

Grand Slam singles results
- Australian Open: 1R (2005)

Doubles
- Career record: 20–24
- Career titles: 0
- Highest ranking: No. 310 (25 October 2004)

Grand Slam doubles results
- French Open: 1R (2003, 2004)

Capucine Rousseau (born 21 April 1980) is a former professional tennis player from France.

== Biography ==
Rousseau, a right-handed player from Croix in the far north of France, began competing on tour in 2000. She won her first ITF title in 2001 at Tortosa, where she had a win over Svetlana Kuznetsova en route. In 2003, she won two further ITF events, including a $25,000 level tournament in Ostrava. She featured in the women's doubles main draws at the 2003 and 2004 French Opens. Ranked as high as 118 in singles, she made her only WTA Tour main draw appearance at Hasselt in 2004. She received a wildcard into the 2005 Australian Open and lost a close first-round match to Tatiana Perebiynis, 5–7 in the third set.

Based in Brittany, Rousseau now works as a financial advisor for Allianz and also plays the sport of beach tennis competitively on the ITF Beach Tennis Tour.

== ITF finals ==
$25,000 tournaments
$10,000 tournaments

=== Singles: 5 (3–2) ===
Outcome	No.	Date	Tournament	Surface	Opponent	Score
Winner	1.	13 May 2001	ITF Tortosa, Spain	Clay	(Austria) Daniela Klemenschits	6–3, 6–0
Runner-up	2.	30 June 2002	ITF Perigueux, France	Clay	(Spain) Maria-Rosa Sitja-Gibert	3–6, 6–7^{(7)}
Runner-up	3.	10 November 2002	ITF Villenave-d'Ornon, France	Clay (i)	(Croatia) Maja Palaveršić	2–6, 6–1, 4–6
Winner	4.	20 July 2003	ITF Le Touquet, France	Clay	(Madagascar) Natacha Randriantefy	7–6^{(3)}, 6–0
Winner	5.	14 December 2003	ITF Ostrava, Czech Republic	Carpet (i)	(Bosnia and Herzegovina) Mervana Jugić-Salkić	6–2, 7–6^{(4)}

=== Doubles: 2 (0–2) ===
Outcome	No.	Date	Tournament	Surface	Partner	Opponents	Score
Runner-up	1.	6 May 2001	ITF Cagnes-sur-Mer, France	Clay	(France) Sophie Georges	(France) Carine Bornu (France) Caroline Dhenin	4–6, 3–6
Runner-up	2.	7 May 2001	ITF Tortosa, Spain	Clay	(France) Séverine Beltrame	(Austria) Daniela Klemenschits (Austria) Sandra Klemenschits	3–6, 3–6
