= 2004 French Open – Girls' doubles =

Girls' doubles
- 2004 French Open

Final
- Champion: (Czech Republic) Kateřina Böhmová (Netherlands) Michaëlla Krajicek
- Runner-up: (Russia) Irina Kotkina (Russia) Yaroslava Shvedova
- Score: 6–3, 6–2

Events
Singles	men	women		boys	girls
Doubles	men	women	mixed	boys	girls
WC Singles	men	women	quad
WC Doubles	men	women	quad
Legends	−45	45+	women
- French Open

Marta Fraga and Adriana González-Peñas were the defending champions, but did not compete in the Juniors that year.

Kateřina Böhmová and Michaëlla Krajicek won the title, defeating Irina Kotkina and Yaroslava Shvedova in the final, 6–3, 6–2.

== Seeds ==
1. (Czech Republic) Veronika Chvojková / (Bulgaria) Sessil Karatantcheva (second round)
2. (Chinese Taipei) Yung-Jan Chan / (China) Sheng-Nan Sun (second round)
3. (Belarus) Victoria Azarenka / (Belarus) Olga Govortsova (semifinals)
4. (Romania) Mădălina Gojnea / (Romania) Monica Niculescu (semifinals)
5. (Switzerland) Timea Bacsinszky / (Israel) Shahar Pe'er (quarterfinals)
6. (Czech Republic) Kateřina Böhmová / (Netherlands) Michaëlla Krajicek (champions)
7. (New Zealand) Marina Erakovic / (Netherlands) Bibiane Schoofs (first round)
8. (Romania) Ágnes Szatmári / (Hungary) Ágnes Szávay (first round)

== Draw ==
Key

- Q = Qualifier
- WC = Wild card
- LL = Lucky loser
- Alt = Alternate
- ITF = ITF entry
- PR = Protected ranking
- SR = Special ranking
- SE = Special exempt
- JE = Junior exempt
- JR = Junior Accelerator Programme entrant
- CO = College Accelerator Programme entrant
- NG = Next Gen Accelerator Program entrant
- w/o = Walkover
- r = Retired
- d = Defaulted

=== Finals ===
Semifinals
(Russia) Irina Kotkina (Russia) Yaroslava Shvedova	6	6
3	(Belarus) Victoria Azarenka (Belarus) Olga Govortsova	4	2
4	(Romania) Mădălina Gojnea (Romania) Monica Niculescu	6	5	2
6	(Czech Republic) Kateřina Böhmová (Netherlands) Michaëlla Krajicek	4	7	6

Final
(Russia) Irina Kotkina (Russia) Yaroslava Shvedova	3	2
6	(Czech Republic) Kateřina Böhmová (Netherlands) Michaëlla Krajicek	6	6

=== Top half ===
First round
1	(Czech Republic) Veronika Chvojková (Bulgaria) Sessil Karatantcheva	6	6
(Russia) Evgenia Grebenyuk (Thailand) Pichittra Thongdach	3	3
WC	(France) Mailyne Andrieux (France) Laura Thorpe	2	2
(Russia) Irina Kotkina (Russia) Yaroslava Shvedova	6	6
(Argentina) Florencia Molinero (Brazil) Teliana Pereira	2	0
(Canada) Stéphanie Dubois (United States) Yasmin Schnack	6	6
(Russia) Alla Kudryavtseva (Japan) Yurika Sema	5	6	6
7	(New Zealand) Marina Erakovic (Netherlands) Bibiane Schoofs	7	0	3
3	(Belarus) Victoria Azarenka (Belarus) Olga Govortsova	6	6
(Argentina) Betina Jozami (France) Anna-Maria Zubori	2	1
WC	(France) Alizé Cornet (France) Aravane Rezaï	6	6
(Croatia) Sanja Ančić (Canada) Aleksandra Wozniak	4	1
(Ecuador) Estefania Balda Álvarez (Chinese Taipei) Wen-Hsin Hsu	1	5
(Poland) Magdalena Kiszczyńska (Czech Republic) Kateřina Kramperová	6	7
(Germany) Korina Perkovic (Netherlands) Nicole Thyssen	0	3
5	(Switzerland) Timea Bacsinszky (Israel) Shahar Pe'er	6	6

Second round
1	(Czech Republic) V Chvojková (Bulgaria) S Karatantcheva	3	4
(Russia) I Kotkina (Russia) Y Shvedova	6	6
(Canada) S Dubois (United States) Y Schnack	4	7^{7}	4
(Russia) A Kudryavtseva (Japan) Y Sema	6	6^{5}	6
3	(Belarus) V Azarenka (Belarus) O Govortsova	6	6
WC	(France) A Cornet (France) A Rezaï	2	2
(Poland) M Kiszczyńska (Czech Republic) K Kramperová	4	2
5	(Switzerland) T Bacsinszky (Israel) S Pe'er	6	6

Quarterfinals
(Russia) I Kotkina (Russia) Y Shvedova	6	6
(Russia) A Kudryavtseva (Japan) Y Sema	1	2
3	(Belarus) V Azarenka (Belarus) O Govortsova	6	6
5	(Switzerland) T Bacsinszky (Israel) S Pe'er	2	2

Semifinals
(Russia) I Kotkina (Russia) Y Shvedova	6	6
3	(Belarus) V Azarenka (Belarus) O Govortsova	4	2

=== Bottom half ===
First round
8	(Romania) Ágnes Szatmári (Hungary) Ágnes Szávay	1	0
(Ukraine) Kateryna Bondarenko (Ukraine) Olga Savchuk	6	6
(Russia) Ekaterina Kosminskaya (Russia) Ekaterina Makarova	6	7
(Slovakia) Jana Juricová (Slovakia) Magdaléna Rybáriková	0	5
WC	(France) Virginie Ayassamy (Mauritius) Marinne Giraud	6	7^{7}
(Italy) Verdiana Verardi (Denmark) Caroline Wozniacki	2	6^{3}
(United States) Krystina Marcio (Germany) Laura Siegemund	3	3
4	(Romania) Mădălina Gojnea (Romania) Monica Niculescu	6	6
6	(Czech Republic) Kateřina Böhmová (Netherlands) Michaëlla Krajicek	6	6
WC	(France) Pauline Parmentier (France) Irena Pavlovic	3	2
(Slovenia) Ana Jerman (Slovenia) Maša Zec Peškirič	0	0
(Germany) Angelique Kerber (Poland) Marta Leśniak	6	6
(Russia) Regina Kulikova (Russia) Evgeniya Rodina	6	6
(Germany) Maraike Biglmaier (Germany) Tatjana Malek	3	2
(United States) Julia Cohen (United States) Mary Gambale	1	4
2	(Chinese Taipei) Yung-Jan Chan (China) Sheng-Nan Sun	6	6

Second round
(Ukraine) K Bondarenko (Ukraine) O Savchuk	3	6	6
(Russia) E Kosminskaya (Russia) E Makarova	6	3	2
WC	(France) V Ayassamy (Mauritius) M Giraud	2	2
4	(Romania) M Gojnea (Romania) M Niculescu	6	6
6	(Czech Republic) K Böhmová (Netherlands) M Krajicek	7^{7}	7
(Germany) A Kerber (Poland) M Leśniak	6^{0}	5
(Russia) R Kulikova (Russia) E Rodina	7	6
2	(Chinese Taipei) Y-J Chan (China) S-N Sun	5	3

Quarterfinals
(Ukraine) K Bondarenko (Ukraine) O Savchuk	6^{9}	7^{7}	4
4	(Romania) M Gojnea (Romania) M Niculescu	7^{11}	6^{3}	6
6	(Czech Republic) K Böhmová (Netherlands) M Krajicek	6	6
(Russia) R Kulikova (Russia) E Rodina	2	1

Semifinals
4	(Romania) M Gojnea (Romania) M Niculescu	6	5	2
6	(Czech Republic) K Böhmová (Netherlands) M Krajicek	4	7	6
