= 2004 French Open – Boys' doubles =

Boys' doubles
- 2004 French Open

Final
- Champion: (Spain) Pablo Andújar (Spain) Marcel Granollers
- Runner-up: (United States) Alex Kuznetsov (Germany) Mischa Zverev
- Score: 6–3, 6–2

Events
Singles	men	women		boys	girls
Doubles	men	women	mixed	boys	girls
WC Singles	men	women	quad
WC Doubles	men	women	quad
Legends	−45	45+	women
← 2003 ·	French Open	· 2005 →

György Balázs and Dudi Sela were the defending champions, but did not compete in the Juniors in this year.

Pablo Andújar and Marcel Granollers won in the final 6–3, 6–2 against Alex Kuznetsov and Mischa Zverev.

== Seeds ==
1. (United States) Brendan Evans / (United States) Scott Oudsema (semifinals)
2. (South Korea) Jun Woong-sun / (South Korea) Kim Sun-yong (second round)
3. (France) Gaël Monfils / (France) Josselin Ouanna (quarterfinals, retired)
4. (Spain) Guillermo Alcaide / (Netherlands) Remko de Rijke (first round)
5. (El Salvador) Rafael Arévalo / (Netherlands) Coen van Keulen (second round)
6. (Argentina) Juan-Pablo Amado / (Argentina) Eduardo Schwank (second round, withdrew)
7. (United States) Alex Kuznetsov / (Germany) Mischa Zverev (final)
8. (India) Karan Rastogi / (Chinese Taipei) Chu-Huan Yi (second round)

== Draw ==
=== Key ===
- Q = Qualifier
- WC = Wild card
- LL = Lucky loser
- Alt = Alternate
- SE = Special exempt
- PR = Protected ranking
- ITF = ITF entry
- JE = Junior exempt
- w/o = Walkover
- r = Retired
- d = Defaulted
- SR = Special ranking

=== Finals ===
Semifinals
1	(United States) Brendan Evans (United States) Scott Oudsema	2	6	6
(Spain) Pablo Andújar (Spain) Marcel Granollers	6	3	8
7	(United States) Alex Kuznetsov (Germany) Mischa Zverev	7^{7}	6
(India) Tushar Liberhan (India) Divij Sharan	6^{5}	4

Final
(Spain) Pablo Andújar (Spain) Marcel Granollers	6	6
7	(United States) Alex Kuznetsov (Germany) Mischa Zverev	3	2

=== Top half ===
First round
1	(United States) Brendan Evans (United States) Scott Oudsema	6	6
(South Africa) Kevin Anderson (Morocco) Mehdi Ziadi	1	4
WC	(France) Jérémy Chardy (France) Jérémy Dréan	2	4
(Australia) Lachlan Ferguson (Australia) Joel Kerley	6	6
(Germany) Daniel Müller (United Kingdom) Jamie Murray	4	5
WC	(France) Fabrice Martin (United States) Donald Young	6	7
(United States) Timothy Neilly (Germany) Sebastian Rieschick	3	2
6	(Argentina) Juan-Pablo Amado (Argentina) Eduardo Schwank	6	6
4	(Spain) Guillermo Alcaide (Netherlands) Remko de Rijke	1	1
(Austria) Martin Fischer (Austria) Philipp Oswald	6	6
WC	(France) Antoine Benneteau (France) Sebastian Louis	3	3
(Spain) Pablo Andújar (Spain) Marcel Granollers	6	6
(Netherlands) Robin Haase (Netherlands) Igor Sijsling	4	6	3
(Russia) Evgeny Kirillov (Russia) Alexander Krasnorutskiy	6	3	6
(Italy) Fabio Fognini (Italy) Gianluca Naso	2	6	2
5	(El Salvador) Rafael Arévalo (Netherlands) Coen van Keulen	6	4	6

Second round
1	(United States) B Evans (United States) S Oudsema	7	4	6
(Australia) L Ferguson (Australia) J Kerley	5	6	3
WC	(France) F Martin (United States) D Young	w/o
6	(Argentina) J-P Amado (Argentina) E Schwank
(Austria) M Fischer (Austria) P Oswald	4	4
(Spain) P Andújar (Spain) M Granollers	6	6
(Russia) E Kirillov (Russia) A Krasnorutskiy	7^{7}	6
5	(El Salvador) R Arévalo (Netherlands) C van Keulen	6^{3}	3

Quarterfinals
1	(United States) B Evans (United States) S Oudsema	6	6
WC	(France) F Martin (United States) D Young	4	1
(Spain) P Andújar (Spain) M Granollers	1	7	6
(Russia) E Kirillov (Russia) A Krasnorutskiy	6	5	4

Semifinals
1	(United States) B Evans (United States) S Oudsema	2	6	6
(Spain) P Andújar (Spain) M Granollers	6	3	8

=== Bottom half ===
First round
7	(United States) Alex Kuznetsov (Germany) Mischa Zverev	2	6	6
(Argentina) Juan Martín del Potro (Brazil) Bruno Rosa	6	3	3
(United States) Nikita Kryvonos (United States) Vahid Mirzadeh	6	6
(Brazil) Thomaz Bellucci (Brazil) André Miele	1	1
(Italy) Andrea Arnaboldi (United Kingdom) Miles Kasiri	6	6
(Slovakia) Kamil Čapkovič (Slovakia) Peter Miklušičák	4	1
(United Kingdom) Jamie Baker (United Kingdom) Tom Rushby	7^{7}	5	3
3	(France) Gaël Monfils (France) Josselin Ouanna	6^{5}	7	6
8	(India) Karan Rastogi (Chinese Taipei) Chu-Huan Yi	6^{4}	6	6
(Slovakia) Lukáš Lacko (Venezuela) David Navarrete	7^{7}	4	1
(United States) Phillip Simmonds (South Africa) Fritz Wolmarans	6	6
WC	(France) Jonathan Dasnières de Veigy (France) Mathieu Dehaine	1	4
(India) Tushar Liberhan (India) Divij Sharan	1	6
(Serbia and Montenegro) Viktor Troicki (Croatia) Vilim Višak	6	3^{r}
(New Zealand) G.D. Jones (New Zealand) William Ward	3	3
2	(South Korea) Jun Woong-sun (South Korea) Kim Sun-yong	6	6

Second round
7	(United States) A Kuznetsov (Germany) M Zverev	6	6
(United States) N Kryvonos (United States) V Mirzadeh	4	2
(Italy) A Arnaboldi (United Kingdom) M Kasiri	3	3
3	(France) G Monfils (France) J Ouanna	6	6
8	(India) K Rastogi (Chinese Taipei) C-H Yi	7^{7}	6^{6}	5
(United States) P Simmonds (South Africa) F Wolmarans	6^{2}	7^{8}	7
(India) T Liberhan (India) D Sharan	6	7^{7}
2	(South Korea) W-s Jun (South Korea) S-y Kim	3	6^{5}

Quarterfinals
7	(United States) A Kuznetsov (Germany) M Zverev	6
3	(France) G Monfils (France) J Ouanna	3^{r}
(United States) P Simmonds (South Africa) F Wolmarans	4	2
(India) T Liberhan (India) D Sharan	6	6

Semifinals
7	(United States) A Kuznetsov (Germany) M Zverev	7^{7}	6
(India) T Liberhan (India) D Sharan	6^{5}	4
