= 2004 French Open – Boys' singles =

Boys' singles
- 2004 French Open

Final
- Champion: (France) Gaël Monfils
- Runner-up: (United States) Alex Kuznetsov
- Score: 6–2, 6–2

Events
Singles	men	women		boys	girls
Doubles	men	women	mixed	boys	girls
WC Singles	men	women	quad
WC Doubles	men	women	quad
Legends	−45	45+	women
← 2003 ·	French Open	· 2005 →

The 2004 French Open boys' singles tournament was an event during the 2004 French Open tennis tournament. Stanislas Wawrinka was the defending champion, but did not compete in the Juniors in this year.

Gaël Monfils won in the final 6–2, 6–2, against Alex Kuznetsov.

== Seeds ==
1. (France) Gaël Monfils (champion)
2. (Spain) Marcel Granollers (first round)
3. (France) Josselin Ouanna (third round)
4. (Germany) Sebastian Rieschick (second round)
5. (United States) Brendan Evans (semifinals)
6. (Italy) Fabio Fognini (quarterfinals)
7. (Argentina) Eduardo Schwank (second round)
8. (Germany) Mischa Zverev (quarterfinals)
9. (Slovakia) Kamil Čapkovič (semifinals)
10. (South Korea) Woong-Sun Jun (second round)
11. (South Korea) Kim Sun-yong (third round)
12. (India) Karan Rastogi (second round)
13. (Spain) Pablo Andújar (quarterfinals)
14. (United States) Alex Kuznetsov (final)
15. (Slovakia) Lukáš Lacko (quarterfinals)
16. (United States) Scott Oudsema (first round)

== Draw ==
=== Key ===
- Q = Qualifier
- WC = Wild card
- LL = Lucky loser
- Alt = Alternate
- SE = Special exempt
- PR = Protected ranking
- ITF = ITF entry
- JE = Junior exempt
- w/o = Walkover
- r = Retired
- d = Defaulted
- SR = Special ranking

=== Finals ===
Quarterfinals
1	(France) Gaël Monfils	6	6
6	(Italy) Fabio Fognini	1	1
13	(Spain) Pablo Andújar	6	5	2
9	(Slovakia) Kamil Čapkovič	1	7	6
8	(Germany) Mischa Zverev	5	4
14	(United States) Alex Kuznetsov	7	6
5	(United States) Brendan Evans	6	6
15	(Slovakia) Lukáš Lacko	4	2

Semifinals
1	(France) Gaël Monfils	6	6
9	(Slovakia) Kamil Čapkovič	2	2
14	(United States) Alex Kuznetsov	3	6	6
5	(United States) Brendan Evans	6	4	0

Final
1	(France) Gaël Monfils	6	6
14	(United States) Alex Kuznetsov	2	2

=== Top half ===
==== Section 1 ====
First round
1	(France) Gaël Monfils	3	6	6
(Spain) Guillermo Alcaide	6	2	1
(United States) Nikita Kryvonos	7^{7}	6
SE	(United Kingdom) Jamie Baker	6^{3}	2
Q	(Brazil) André Miele	3	5
(Argentina) Juan-Pablo Amado	6	7
(Serbia and Montenegro) Viktor Troicki	6	6
16	(United States) Scott Oudsema	3	3
11	(South Korea) Kim Sun-yong	6	6
(United States) Phillip Simmonds	0	3
(Germany) Daniel Muller	7	2	5
Q	(Russia) Alexander Krasnorutskiy	5	6	7
Q	(Czech Republic) Jan Marek	6^{6}	6	6
WC	(France) Antoine Benneteau	7^{8}	3	4
Q	(Venezuela) David Navarrete	2	3
6	(Italy) Fabio Fognini	6	6

Second round
1	(France) G Monfils	6	6
(United States) N Kryvonos	2	3
(Argentina) J-P Amado	6	3	1
(Serbia and Montenegro) V Troicki	4	6	6
11	(South Korea) S-y Kim	4	6	6
Q	(Russia) A Krasnorutskiy	6	3	2
Q	(Czech Republic) J Marek	3	0
6	(Italy) F Fognini	6	6

Third round
1	(France) G Monfils	6	6
(Serbia and Montenegro) V Troicki	2	2
11	(South Korea) S-y Kim	4	3
6	(Italy) F Fognini	6	6

Quarterfinals
1	(France) G Monfils	6	6
6	(Italy) F Fognini	1	1

==== Section 2 ====
First round
4	(Germany) Sebastian Rieschick	6	6
(Australia) Joel Kerley	4	4
Q	(Italy) Gianluca Naso	2	7^{7}	6
(Brazil) Thomaz Bellucci	6	6^{2}	2
(United States) Vahid Mirzadeh	1	4
(Netherlands) Coen van Keulen	6	6
WC	(France) Jérémy Chardy	3	7	5
13	(Spain) Pablo Andújar	6	5	7
9	(Slovakia) Kamil Čapkovič	6	6
WC	(France) Mathieu Dehaine	2	4
(India) Divij Sharan	1	2
(United Kingdom) Miles Kasiri	6	6
(New Zealand) G.D. Jones	3	2
(United States) Scoville Jenkins	6	6
Q	(South Africa) Kevin Anderson	3	4
7	(Argentina) Eduardo Schwank	6	6

Second round
4	(Germany) S Rieschick	2	6	3
Q	(Italy) G Naso	6	4	6
(Netherlands) C van Keulen	2	6^{3}
13	(Spain) P Andújar	6	7^{7}
9	(Slovakia) K Čapkovič	7^{7}	6
(United Kingdom) M Kasiri	6^{4}	2
(United States) S Jenkins	3	6	6
7	(Argentina) E Schwank	6	4	3

Third round
Q	(Italy) G Naso	6	5	4
13	(Spain) P Andújar	3	7	6
9	(Slovakia) K Čapkovič	7	6
(United States) S Jenkins	5	3

Quarterfinals
13	(Spain) P Andújar	6	5	2
9	(Slovakia) K Čapkovič	1	7	6

=== Bottom half ===
==== Section 3 ====
First round
8	(Germany) Mischa Zverev	7^{8}	6
(Italy) Andrea Arnaboldi	6^{6}	2
WC	(France) Sebastian Louis	4	4
Q	(Russia) Evgeny Kirillov	6	6
(United Kingdom) Jamie Murray	2	6	4
(India) Tushar Liberhan	6	4	6
WC	(United States) Donald Young	7^{10}	5	3
10	(South Korea) Woong-Sun Jun	6^{8}	7	6
14	(United States) Alex Kuznetsov	6	6
(Slovakia) Peter Miklusicak	2	2
(Argentina) Juan Martín del Potro	2	6	3
(South Africa) Fritz Wolmarans	6	3	6
(Brazil) Bruno Rosa	5	6	6
(Morocco) Mehdi Ziadi	7	4	3
(Netherlands) Robin Haase	4	7^{10}	3
3	(France) Josselin Ouanna	6	6^{8}	6

Second round
8	(Germany) M Zverev	5	6	6
Q	(Russia) E Kirillov	7	4	4
(India) T Liberhan	4	6	6
10	(South Korea) W-S Jun	6	2	3
14	(United States) A Kuznetsov	4	6	7
(South Africa) F Wolmarans	6	1	5
(Brazil) B Rosa	4	0
3	(France) J Ouanna	6	6

Third round
8	(Germany) M Zverev	6	6
(India) T Liberhan	3	3
14	(United States) A Kuznetsov	2	6	6
3	(France) J Ouanna	6	4	4

Quarterfinals
8	(Germany) M Zverev	5	4
14	(United States) A Kuznetsov	7	6

==== Section 4 ====
First round
5	(United States) Brendan Evans	5	6	6
(Chinese Taipei) Chu-Huan Yi	7	4	4
(Croatia) Vilim Višak	6	0	6
WC	(France) Jeremy Drean	0	6	3
(United Kingdom) Tom Rushby	0	1
Q	(Austria) Martin Fischer	6	6
WC	(France) Jonathan Dasnières de Veigy	3	7^{7}	3
12	(India) Karan Rastogi	6	6^{1}	6
15	(Slovakia) Lukáš Lacko	5	6	0
(New Zealand) William Ward	7	4	0^{r}
(Netherlands) Remko de Rijke	2	5
WC	(France) Olivier Renavand	6	7
(United States) Timothy Neilly	6	5	3
(Australia) Lachlan Ferguson	2	7	6
(El Salvador) Rafael Arévalo	1	7	8
2	(Spain) Marcel Granollers	6	5	6

Second round
5	(United States) B Evans	6	6
(Croatia) V Višak	3	1
Q	(Austria) M Fischer	6	1	6
12	(India) K Rastogi	2	6	3
15	(Slovakia) L Lacko	6	6
WC	(France) O Renavand	3	2
(United States) T Neilly	1	4
(El Salvador) R Arévalo	6	6

Third round
5	(United States) B Evans	6	6
Q	(Austria) M Fischer	2	4
15	(Slovakia) L Lacko	2	6	7
(El Salvador) R Arévalo	6	3	5

Quarterfinals
5	(United States) B Evans	6	6
15	(Slovakia) L Lacko	4	2

== Sources ==
- ITF Tennis
