= 2004 French Open – Girls' singles =

Girls' singles
- 2004 French Open

Final
- Champion: (Bulgaria) Sesil Karatantcheva
- Runner-up: (Romania) Mădălina Gojnea
- Score: 6–4, 6–0

Events
Singles	men	women		boys	girls
Doubles	men	women	mixed	boys	girls
WC Singles	men	women	quad
WC Doubles	men	women	quad
Legends	−45	45+	women
← 2003 ·	French Open	· 2005 →

The 2004 French Open girls' singles tournament was an event during the 2004 French Open tennis tournament. Anna-Lena Grönefeld was the defending champion, but did not compete in the Juniors in this year.

Sesil Karatantcheva won in the final 6–4, 6–0, against Mădălina Gojnea.

== Seeds ==
1. (Bulgaria) Sessil Karatantcheva (champion)
2. (Slovakia) Jarmila Gajdošová (first round)
3. (Israel) Shahar Pe'er (quarterfinals)
4. (Netherlands) Michaëlla Krajicek (quarterfinals)
5. (Switzerland) Timea Bacsinszky (semifinals)
6. (Ukraine) Kateryna Bondarenko (semifinals)
7. (Chinese Taipei) Yung-Jan Chan (first round)
8. (Russia) Elena Vesnina (quarterfinals)
9. (Czech Republic) Kateřina Böhmová (third round)
10. (Czech Republic) Veronika Chvojková (first round)
11. (New Zealand) Marina Erakovic (first round)
12. (Romania) Monica Niculescu (third round)
13. (Belarus) Victoria Azarenka (third round)
14. (Russia) Alla Kudryavtseva (third round)
15. (Germany) Angelique Kerber (first round)
16. (France) Pauline Parmentier (second round)

== Draw ==
=== Key ===
- Q = Qualifier
- WC = Wild card
- LL = Lucky loser
- Alt = Alternate
- SE = Special exempt
- PR = Protected ranking
- ITF = ITF entry
- JE = Junior exempt
- w/o = Walkover
- r = Retired
- d = Defaulted
- SR = Special ranking

=== Finals ===
Quarterfinals
1	(Bulgaria) Sessil Karatantcheva	6	6
8	(Russia) Elena Vesnina	3	1
3	(Israel) Shahar Pe'er	5	3
6	(Ukraine) Kateryna Bondarenko	7	6
5/Q	(Switzerland) Timea Bacsinszky	6	2	8
4	(Netherlands) Michaëlla Krajicek	3	6	6
(Italy) Verdiana Verardi	3	3
(Romania) Mădălina Gojnea	6	6

Semifinals
1	(Bulgaria) Sessil Karatantcheva	7^{7}	6
6	(Ukraine) Kateryna Bondarenko	6^{4}	1
5/Q	(Switzerland) Timea Bacsinszky	6^{11}	6	2
(Romania) Mădălina Gojnea	7^{13}	0	6

Final
1	(Bulgaria) Sessil Karatantcheva	6	6
(Romania) Mădălina Gojnea	4	0

=== Top half ===
==== Section 1 ====
First round
1	(Bulgaria) Sessil Karatantcheva	6	6
WC	(France) Virginie Ayassamy	1	1
(Thailand) Pichittra Thongdach	3	6	6
Q	(New Zealand) Eden Marama	6	4	4
(Russia) Ekaterina Makarova	1	1
(Canada) Stéphanie Dubois	6	6
(Germany) Tatjana Malek	5	1
16/WC	(France) Pauline Parmentier	7	6
9	(Czech Republic) Kateřina Böhmová	6	6
(Brazil) Teliana Pereira	2	4
Q	(France) Ana-Maria Zubori	4	6	6
(United States) Julia Cohen	6	2	2
(Slovenia) Ana Jerman	0	3
Q	(Netherlands) Nicole Thyssen	6	6
(Germany) Maraike Biglmaier	1	1
8	(Russia) Elena Vesnina	6	6

Second round
1	(Bulgaria) S Karatantcheva	6	6
(Thailand) P Thongdach	2	1
(Canada) S Dubois	6	6
16/WC	(France) P Parmentier	2	4
9	(Czech Republic) K Böhmová	6	6
Q	(France) A-M Zubori	2	1
Q	(Netherlands) N Thyssen	4	1
8	(Russia) E Vesnina	6	6

Third round
1	(Bulgaria) S Karatantcheva	6	6
(Canada) S Dubois	3	3
9	(Czech Republic) K Böhmová	4	4
8	(Russia) E Vesnina	6	6

Quarterfinals
1	(Bulgaria) S Karatantcheva	6	6
8	(Russia) E Vesnina	3	1

==== Section 2 ====
First round
3	(Israel) Shahar Pe'er	6	1	6
(Hungary) Ágnes Szávay	3	6	4
(Russia) Regina Kulikova	7	6
(Czech Republic) Kateřina Kramperová	5	0
(Netherlands) Bibiane Schoofs	6^{2}	6	1
(Chinese Taipei) Wen-Hsin Hsu	7^{7}	3	6
WC	(France) Alizé Cornet	0	3
13	(Belarus) Victoria Azarenka	6	6
12	(Romania) Monica Niculescu	6	6
(United States) Yasmin Schnack	1	3
WC	(France) Yulia Fedossova	4	6	2
Q	(Germany) Korina Perkovic	6	4	6
(Russia) Evgeniya Rodina	7	4	5
Q	(Japan) Ryōko Fuda	5	6	7
(Slovakia) Jana Juricová	4	1
6	(Ukraine) Kateryna Bondarenko	6	6

Second round
3	(Israel) S Pe'er	6	2	6
(Russia) R Kulikova	2	6	2
(Chinese Taipei) W-H Hsu	2	3
13	(Belarus) V Azarenka	6	6
12	(Romania) M Niculescu	6	6
Q	(Germany) K Perkovic	0	0
Q	(Japan) R Fuda	4	1
6	(Ukraine) K Bondarenko	6	6

Third round
3	(Israel) S Pe'er	6	7
13	(Belarus) V Azarenka	4	5
12	(Romania) M Niculescu	7	4	4
6	(Ukraine) K Bondarenko	5	6	6

Quarterfinals
3	(Israel) S Pe'er	5	3
6	(Ukraine) K Bondarenko	7	6

=== Bottom half ===
==== Section 3 ====
First round
5/Q	(Switzerland) Timea Bacsinszky	6	6
(Poland) Marta Leśniak	1	3
(United States) Mary Gambale	7	6
Q	(Russia) Yaroslava Shvedova	6	1
(Belarus) Olga Govortsova	6	5	7
(Slovakia) Magdaléna Rybáriková	2	7	5
WC	(France) Aravane Rezaï	7	6
10	(Czech Republic) Veronika Chvojková	5	4
15	(Germany) Angelique Kerber	1	1
SE	(Russia) Ekaterina Kosminskaya	6	6
(Romania) Ágnes Szatmári	2	6	3
WC	(France) Violette Huck	6	1	6
(Ecuador) Estefania Balda Álvarez	4	2
(Russia) Evgenia Grebenyuk	6	6
(China) Sheng-Nan Sun	3	0
4	(Netherlands) Michaëlla Krajicek	6	6

Second round
5/Q	(Switzerland) T Bacsinszky	5	6	6
(United States) M Gambale	7	3	0
(Belarus) O Govortsova	6	6
WC	(France) A Rezaï	1	2
SE	(Russia) E Kosminskaya	4	2
WC	(France) V Huck	6	6
(Russia) E Grebenyuk	7	6^{5}	2
4	(Netherlands) M Krajicek	5	7^{7}	6

Third round
5/Q	(Switzerland) T Bacsinszky	6	3	6
(Belarus) O Govortsova	4	6	1
WC	(France) V Huck	6	5	1
4	(Netherlands) M Krajicek	4	7	6

Quarterfinals
5/Q	(Switzerland) T Bacsinszky	6	2	8
4	(Netherlands) M Krajicek	3	6	6

==== Section 4 ====
First round
7	(Chinese Taipei) Yung-Jan Chan	6^{4}	3
(Slovenia) Maša Zec-Peškirič	7^{7}	6
(Serbia and Montenegro) Vojislava Lukić	6	6^{4}	6
WC	(France) Mailyne Andrieux	4	7^{7}	4
(Croatia) Sanja Ančić	7	1	6
(Italy) Verdiana Verardi	5	6	8
(Canada) Aleksandra Wozniak	6	6
(Russia) Irina Kotkina	1	3
11	(New Zealand) Marina Erakovic	4	5
14	(Russia) Alla Kudryavtseva	6	7
WC	(Mauritius) Marinne Giraud	6	3	3
(United States) Krystina Marcio	4	6	6
Q	(Germany) Laura Siegemund	0	4
(Romania) Mădălina Gojnea	6	6
SE	(Ukraine) Olga Savchuk	7^{7}	6
2	(Slovakia) Jarmila Gajdošová	6^{5}	4

Second round
(Slovenia) M Zec-Peškirič	4	7	6
(Serbia and Montenegro) V Lukić	6	5	2
(Italy) V Verardi	7	2	6
(Canada) A Wozniak	5	6	4
14	(Russia) A Kudryavtseva	6	7
(United States) K Marcio	4	5
(Romania) M Gojnea	6	6
SE	(Ukraine) O Savchuk	3	2

Third round
(Slovenia) M Zec-Peškirič	1	1
(Italy) V Verardi	6	6
14	(Russia) A Kudryavtseva	2	0
(Romania) M Gojnea	6	6

Quarterfinals
(Italy) V Verardi	3	3
(Romania) M Gojnea	6	6

== Sources ==
- ITF Tennis
