= 2004 French Open – Men's doubles =

Men's doubles
- 2004 French Open

Final
- Champion: (Belgium) Xavier Malisse (Belgium) Olivier Rochus
- Runner-up: (France) Michaël Llodra (France) Fabrice Santoro
- Score: 7–5, 7–5

Details
- Draw: 64
- Seeds: 16

Events
Singles	men	women		boys	girls
Doubles	men	women	mixed	boys	girls
WC Singles	men	women	quad
WC Doubles	men	women	quad
Legends	−45	45+	women
- French Open

Bob and Mike Bryan were the defending champions, they lost to sixth-seeded Michaël Llodra and Fabrice Santoro in the semifinals.

Unseeded Belgian pair Xavier Malisse and Olivier Rochus defeated Llodra and Santoro, 7–5, 7–5 to win the men's doubles title.

== Seeds ==
1. (United States) Bob Bryan / (United States) Mike Bryan (semifinals)
2. (Sweden) Jonas Björkman / (Australia) Todd Woodbridge (third round)
3. (India) Mahesh Bhupathi / (Belarus) Max Mirnyi (semifinals)
4. (The Bahamas) Mark Knowles / (Canada) Daniel Nestor (quarterfinals)
5. (Australia) Wayne Arthurs / (Australia) Paul Hanley (first round)
6. (France) Michaël Llodra / (France) Fabrice Santoro (final)
7. (Zimbabwe) Wayne Black / (Zimbabwe) Kevin Ullyett (quarterfinals)
8. (Czech Republic) Martin Damm / (Czech Republic) Cyril Suk (first round)
9. (Argentina) Gastón Etlis / (Argentina) Martín Rodríguez (quarterfinals)
10. (India) Leander Paes / (Czech Republic) David Rikl (second round)
11. (Israel) Jonathan Erlich / (Israel) Andy Ram (third round)
12. (United States) Jared Palmer / (Czech Republic) Pavel Vízner (second round)
13. (Argentina) Mariano Hood / (Argentina) Sebastián Prieto (second round)
14. (Czech Republic) Leoš Friedl / (Czech Republic) František Čermák (third round)
15. (Austria) Julian Knowle / (Serbia and Montenegro) Nenad Zimonjić (second round)
16. (Czech Republic) Tomáš Cibulec / (Czech Republic) Petr Pála (second round)

== Draw ==
Key

- Q = Qualifier
- WC = Wild card
- LL = Lucky loser
- Alt = Alternate
- ITF = ITF entry
- PR = Protected ranking
- SR = Special ranking
- SE = Special exempt
- JE = Junior exempt
- JR = Junior Accelerator Programme entrant
- CO = College Accelerator Programme entrant
- NG = Next Gen Accelerator Program entrant
- w/o = Walkover
- r = Retired
- d = Defaulted

=== Finals ===
Quarterfinals
1	(United States) Bob Bryan (United States) Mike Bryan	6^{6}	7^{7}	7
7	(Zimbabwe) Wayne Black (Zimbabwe) Kevin Ullyett	7^{8}	6^{3}	5
4	(The Bahamas) Mark Knowles (Canada) Daniel Nestor	5	7^{7}	3
6	(France) Michaël Llodra (France) Fabrice Santoro	7	6^{1}	6
(Germany) Karsten Braasch (Armenia) Sargis Sargsian	3	4
3	(India) Mahesh Bhupathi (Belarus) Max Mirnyi	6	6
9	(Argentina) Gastón Etlis (Argentina) Martín Rodríguez	4	4
(Belgium) Olivier Rochus (Belgium) Xavier Malisse	6	6

Semifinals
1	(United States) Bob Bryan (United States) Mike Bryan	5	6	3
6	(France) Michaël Llodra (France) Fabrice Santoro	7	3	6
3	(India) Mahesh Bhupathi (Belarus) Max Mirnyi	6^{1}	6	2
(Belgium) Olivier Rochus (Belgium) Xavier Malisse	7^{7}	4	6

Final
6	(France) Michaël Llodra (France) Fabrice Santoro	5	5
(Belgium) Olivier Rochus (Belgium) Xavier Malisse	7	7

=== Top half ===
==== Section 1 ====
First round
1	(United States) B Bryan (United States) M Bryan	5
(Sweden) J Landsberg (Sweden) R Söderling	0^{r}
Alt	(Australia) S Huss (Japan) J Kato	2	5
WC	(Russia) I Andreev (Russia) N Davydenko	6	7
(France) J Benneteau (Netherlands) N Mahut	6^{3}	5
(Romania) A Pavel (Netherlands) R Sluiter	7^{7}	7
WC	(France) T Ascione (France) J-F Bachelot	5	6^{5}
14	(Czech Republic) F Čermák (Czech Republic) L Friedl	7	7^{7}
11	(Israel) J Erlich (Israel) A Ram	1	6	8
(Czech Republic) D Skotch (United States) J Thomas	6	3	6
(Spain) F López (Spain) F Verdasco	3	7^{11}	6
(France) A Clément (France) N Escudé	6	6^{9}	8
(Australia) J Kerr (Belgium) T Vanhoudt	6	6
(Brazil) A Sá (Brazil) F Saretta	3	4
(Peru) L Horna (Spain) Á López Morón	2	3
7	(Zimbabwe) W Black (Zimbabwe) K Ullyett	6	6

Second round
(United States) B Bryan (United States) M Bryan	6	6
WC	(Russia) I Andreev (Russia) N Davydenko	3	2
(Romania) A Pavel (Netherlands) R Sluiter	5	4
14	(Czech Republic) F Čermák (Czech Republic) L Friedl	7	6
11	(Israel) J Erlich (Israel) A Ram	6	6^{6}	8
(France) A Clément (France) N Escudé	3	7^{8}	6
(Australia) J Kerr (Belgium) T Vanhoudt	3	4
7	(Zimbabwe) W Black (Zimbabwe) K Ullyett	6	6

Third round
1	(United States) B Bryan (United States) M Bryan	6	6
14	(Czech Republic) F Čermák (Czech Republic) L Friedl	1	2
11	(Israel) J Erlich (Israel) A Ram	2	4
7	(Zimbabwe) W Black (Zimbabwe) K Ullyett	6	6

Quarterfinals
1	(United States) B Bryan (United States) M Bryan	6^{6}	7^{7}	7
7	(Zimbabwe) W Black (Zimbabwe) K Ullyett	7^{8}	6^{3}	5

==== Section 2 ====
First round
4	(The Bahamas) M Knowles (Canada) D Nestor	6	5	8
(Australia) A Fisher (Russia) D Tursunov	3	7	6
(United States) R Leach (United States) B MacPhie	7^{8}	6
(Spain) D Ferrer (Spain) A Martín	6^{6}	4
(Argentina) L Arnold Ker (Argentina) M García	1	3
(Switzerland) Y Allegro (Germany) M Kohlmann	6	6
(United States) J-M Gambill (Australia) M Hill	3	2
16	(Czech Republic) T Cibulec (Czech Republic) P Pála	6	6
10	(India) L Paes (Czech Republic) D Rikl	6	6
(Spain) JI Carrasco (Spain) R Ramírez Hidalgo	2	4
(Germany) N Kiefer (Germany) R Schüttler	6	3	3
(Argentina) JI Chela (Argentina) G Gaudio	0	6	6
(Italy) M Bertolini (South Africa) R Koenig	2	6	6
(South Africa) J Coetzee (South Africa) C Haggard	6	4	4
(United States) D Bowen (United States) T Dent	1	4
6	(France) M Llodra (France) F Santoro	6	6

Second round
4	(The Bahamas) M Knowles (Canada) D Nestor	6	6
(United States) R Leach (United States) B MacPhie	2	2
(Switzerland) Y Allegro (Germany) M Kohlmann	1	7^{7}	6
16	(Czech Republic) T Cibulec (Czech Republic) P Pála	6	6^{4}	1
10	(India) L Paes (Czech Republic) D Rikl	6	4	2
(Argentina) JI Chela (Argentina) G Gaudio	2	6	6
(Italy) M Bertolini (South Africa) R Koenig	3	4
6	(France) M Llodra (France) F Santoro	6	6

Third round
4	(The Bahamas) M Knowles (Canada) D Nestor	6	7^{7}
(Switzerland) Y Allegro (Germany) M Kohlmann	4	6^{3}
(Argentina) JI Chela (Argentina) G Gaudio	3	2
6	(France) M Llodra (France) F Santoro	6	6

Quarterfinals
4	(The Bahamas) M Knowles (Canada) D Nestor	5	7^{7}	3
6	(France) M Llodra (France) F Santoro	7	6^{1}	6

=== Bottom half ===
==== Section 3 ====
First round
8	(Czech Republic) M Damm (Czech Republic) C Suk	6^{4}	5
(Poland) M Fyrstenberg (Poland) M Matkowski	7^{7}	7
(Argentina) F Browne (Croatia) I Karlović	7^{8}	6^{7}	6
(Czech Republic) T Berdych (Slovakia) D Hrbatý	6^{6}	7^{9}	4
(United States) T Parrott (Japan) T Shimada	3	0
(Germany) K Braasch (Armenia) S Sargsian	6	6
(Spain) A Montañés (Spain) D Sanchez	2	2
12	(United States) J Palmer (Czech Republic) P Vízner	6	6
15	(Austria) J Knowle (Serbia and Montenegro) N Zimonjić	6	3	8
(United States) R Ginepri (The Bahamas) M Merklein	4	6	6
(Croatia) M Ančić (Croatia) I Ljubičić	6	7
(Czech Republic) J Levinský (Italy) F Volandri	3	5
WC	(France) O Mutis (France) O Patience	2	6^{6}
(Slovakia) K Kučera (Croatia) T Perry	6	7^{8}
WC	(France) S de Chaunac (France) S Robert	1	4
3	(India) M Bhupathi (Belarus) M Mirnyi	6	6

Second round
(Poland) M Fyrstenberg (Poland) M Matkowski	6	1	8
(Argentina) F Browne (Croatia) I Karlović	4	6	6
(Germany) K Braasch (Armenia) S Sargsian	7	6
12	(United States) J Palmer (Czech Republic) P Vízner	5	3
15	(Austria) J Knowle (Serbia and Montenegro) N Zimonjić	3	4
(Croatia) M Ančić (Croatia) I Ljubičić	6	6
(Slovakia) K Kučera (Croatia) T Perry	6	6^{2}	4
3	(India) M Bhupathi (Belarus) M Mirnyi	4	7^{7}	6

Third round
(Poland) M Fyrstenberg (Poland) M Matkowski	7^{7}	1	6
(Germany) K Braasch (Armenia) S Sargsian	6^{5}	6	8
(Croatia) M Ančić (Croatia) I Ljubičić	2	2
3	(India) M Bhupathi (Belarus) M Mirnyi	6	6

Quarterfinals
(Germany) K Braasch (Armenia) S Sargsian	3	4
3	(India) M Bhupathi (Belarus) M Mirnyi	6	6

==== Section 4 ====
First round
5	(Australia) W Arthurs (Australia) P Hanley	6	5	2
(Austria) A Peya (Netherlands) R Wassen	0	7	6
WC	(France) J Boutter (France) A Dupuis	4	4
WC	(France) J Jeanpierre (France) É Roger-Vasselin	6	6
(Sweden) S Aspelin (United States) G Oliver	6	4	4
(Slovakia) K Beck (Czech Republic) J Novák	4	6	6
(Georgia (country)) I Labadze (Austria) J Melzer	5	1
9	(Argentina) G Etlis (Argentina) M Rodríguez	7	6
(Argentina) M Hood (Argentina) S Prieto	6	6
WC	(France) J Haehnel (France) F Serra	3	4
(Belgium) X Malisse (Belgium) O Rochus	6	2	6
(United States) T Martin (Russia) M Youzhny	3	6	3
(Netherlands) J van Lottum (Netherlands) M Verkerk	4	6	6
(Morocco) H Arazi (Israel) H Levy	6	3	4
(United States) S Humphries (Thailand) P Srichaphan	3	2
2	(Sweden) J Björkman (Australia) T Woodbridge	6	6

Second round
(Austria) A Peya (Netherlands) R Wassen	7	6
WC	(France) J Jeanpierre (France) É Roger-Vasselin	5	3
(Slovakia) K Beck (Czech Republic) J Novák	3	2
9	(Argentina) G Etlis (Argentina) M Rodríguez	6	6
(Argentina) M Hood (Argentina) S Prieto	4	1
(Belgium) X Malisse (Belgium) O Rochus	6	6
(Netherlands) J van Lottum (Netherlands) M Verkerk	6	6^{5}	4
(Sweden) J Björkman (Australia) T Woodbridge	4	7^{7}	6

Third round
(Austria) A Peya (Netherlands) R Wassen	1	6	1
9	(Argentina) G Etlis (Argentina) M Rodríguez	6	3	6
(Belgium) X Malisse (Belgium) O Rochus	6	6
2	(Sweden) J Björkman (Australia) T Woodbridge	2	4

Quarterfinals
9	(Argentina) G Etlis (Argentina) M Rodríguez	4	4
(Belgium) X Malisse (Belgium) O Rochus	6	6
