= 2004 French Open – Men's singles =

Men's singles
- 2004 French Open

Final
- Champion: (Argentina) Gastón Gaudio
- Runner-up: (Argentina) Guillermo Coria
- Score: 0–6, 3–6, 6–4, 6–1, 8–6

Details
- Draw: 128
- Seeds: 32

Events
Singles	men	women		boys	girls
Doubles	men	women	mixed	boys	girls
WC Singles	men	women	quad
WC Doubles	men	women	quad
Legends	−45	45+	women
- French Open

Gastón Gaudio defeated Guillermo Coria in the final, 0–6, 3–6, 6–4, 6–1, 8–6 to win the men's singles tennis title at the 2004 French Open. It was his first and only major title, and he was the first Argentine to win a men's singles major since Guillermo Vilas at the 1979 Australian Open. Gaudio came from two sets down, saved two championship points, and twice broke Coria's serve when the latter was serving for the championship. This was just the fourth time in the Open Era—all at the French Open—that a player came back to win a major final from two-sets-down, after Björn Borg in 1974, Ivan Lendl in 1984, and Andre Agassi in 1999. This remains the most recent men's singles major to be won by an unseeded player.

Juan Carlos Ferrero was the defending champion, but was defeated in the second round by Igor Andreev: his first career loss at the French Open prior to the semifinals.

This was the first major where Roger Federer competed as the world No. 1. He lost in the third round to former No. 1 and three-time champion Gustavo Kuerten, his last pre-quarterfinal exit from a major until the 2013 Wimbledon Championships (a run of 36 quarterfinals or better in a row). This would also be Federer's only loss this year at the majors, as he had won the Australian Open and would go on to win Wimbledon and the US Open. Future 14-time champion Rafael Nadal withdrew prior to the tournament due to an ankle injury sustained in Estoril in April. This was the last time that none of the Big Three reached the round of 16 at a major until the 2024 US Open.

This was the first major in the Open Era to feature four Argentines in the quarterfinals, those being Gaudio, Coria, David Nalbandian, and Juan Ignacio Chela.

Wayne Ferreira matched Stefan Edberg's then-record on his 54th consecutive major main draw appearance.

The first round match between Fabrice Santoro and Arnaud Clément was the then-longest match of the Open Era, lasting 6 hours and 33 minutes and played over two days. John Isner and Nicolas Mahut would later break this record with their first-round singles match at the 2010 Wimbledon Championships.

== Seeds ==
1. (Switzerland) Roger Federer (third round)
2. (United States) Andy Roddick (second round)
3. (Argentina) Guillermo Coria (final)
4. (Spain) Juan Carlos Ferrero (second round)
5. (Spain) Carlos Moyá (quarterfinals)
6. (United States) Andre Agassi (first round)
7. (Germany) Rainer Schüttler (first round)
8. (Argentina) David Nalbandian (semifinals)
9. (United Kingdom) Tim Henman (semifinals)
10. (France) Sébastien Grosjean (second round)
11. (Chile) Nicolás Massú (third round)
12. (Australia) Lleyton Hewitt (quarterfinals)
13. (Thailand) Paradorn Srichaphan (second round)
14. (Czech Republic) Jiří Novák (second round)
15. (Netherlands) ~~Sjeng Schalken~~ (withdrew because of a viral infection)
16. (Chile) Fernando González (first round)

17. (Spain) Tommy Robredo (fourth round)
18. (Australia) Mark Philippoussis (first round)
19. (Netherlands) Martin Verkerk (third round)
20. (Russia) Marat Safin (fourth round)
21. (Romania) Andrei Pavel (second round)
22. (Argentina) Juan Ignacio Chela (quarterfinals)
23. (Spain) Feliciano López (fourth round)
24. (Sweden) Jonas Björkman (second round)
25. (Croatia) Ivan Ljubičić (second round)
26. (Spain) Albert Costa (third round)
27. (United States) Vince Spadea (second round)
28. (Brazil) Gustavo Kuerten (quarterfinals)
29. (Belarus) Max Mirnyi (first round)
30. (Argentina) Mariano Zabaleta (second round)
31. (Slovakia) Dominik Hrbatý (second round)
32. (France) Arnaud Clément (first round)

Click on the seed number of a player to go to their draw section.

== Draw ==
Key

- Q = Qualifier
- WC = Wild card
- LL = Lucky loser
- Alt = Alternate
- ITF = ITF entry
- PR = Protected ranking
- SR = Special ranking
- SE = Special exempt
- JE = Junior exempt
- JR = Junior Accelerator Programme entrant
- CO = College Accelerator Programme entrant
- NG = Next Gen Accelerator Program entrant
- w/o = Walkover
- r = Retired
- d = Defaulted

=== Finals ===
Quarterfinals
28	(Brazil) Gustavo Kuerten	2	6	4	6^{6}
8	(Argentina) David Nalbandian	6	3	6	7^{8}
(Argentina) Gastón Gaudio	6	6	6
12	(Australia) Lleyton Hewitt	3	2	2
5	(Spain) Carlos Moyá	5	6^{3}	3
3	(Argentina) Guillermo Coria	7	7^{7}	6
9	(United Kingdom) Tim Henman	6	6	6
22	(Argentina) Juan Ignacio Chela	2	4	4

Semifinals
8	(Argentina) David Nalbandian	3	6^{5}	0
(Argentina) Gastón Gaudio	6	7^{7}	6
3	(Argentina) Guillermo Coria	3	6	6	7
9	(United Kingdom) Tim Henman	6	4	0	5

Final
(Argentina) Gastón Gaudio	0	3	6	6	8
3	(Argentina) Guillermo Coria	6	6	4	1	6

=== Top half ===
==== Section 1 ====
First round
1	(Switzerland) R Federer	6	6	6
LL	(Belgium) K Vliegen	1	2	1
(France) T Ascione	3	2	2
(Germany) N Kiefer	6	6	6
(Spain) R Ramírez Hidalgo	6	5	6	4	3
(Belgium) G Elseneer	3	7	4	6	6
Q	(Spain) N Almagro	5	6^{2}	6	6	5
28	(Brazil) G Kuerten	7	7^{7}	1	3	7
23	(Spain) F López	5	6	6	6
(Ecuador) N Lapentti	7	4	4	4
(Croatia) I Karlović	6^{4}	4	4
(Slovakia) K Kučera	7^{7}	6	6
WC	(France) O Patience	6	7^{7}	6
(Italy) F Volandri	3	6^{5}	0
(Sweden) R Söderling	6	6	3	4	5
LL	(South Korea) H-t Lee	0	3	6	6	7

Second round
1	(Switzerland) R Federer	6	6	7^{8}
(Germany) N Kiefer	3	4	6^{6}
(Belgium) G Elseneer	2	0	3
28	(Brazil) G Kuerten	6	6	6
23	(Spain) F López	6^{3}	6	6	6
(Slovakia) K Kučera	7^{7}	3	4	4
WC	(France) O Patience	4	4	3
LL	(South Korea) H-t Lee	6	6	6

Third round
1	(Switzerland) R Federer	4	4	4
28	(Brazil) G Kuerten	6	6	6
23	(Spain) F López	7^{7}	4	6	6
LL	(South Korea) H-t Lee	6^{3}	6	0	3

Fourth round
28	(Brazil) G Kuerten	6	7	6
23	(Spain) F López	3	5	4

==== Section 2 ====
First round
10	(France) S Grosjean	6	6	6
Q	(United States) K Kim	1	1	4
Q	(Italy) P Starace	6	6	6
(Russia) D Tursunov	2	3	4
(Spain) F Mantilla	6	6	6^{6}	6
LL	(United States) J Salzenstein	4	1	7^{8}	2
(Argentina) A Calleri	7	1	1^{r}
20	(Russia) M Safin	5	6	4
25	(Croatia) I Ljubičić	6^{3}	6	6^{2}	6	6
(Morocco) H Arazi	7^{7}	4	7^{7}	3	3
(Austria) S Koubek	6	7	3	6^{0}	6
(Spain) D Sánchez	3	5	6	7^{7}	0
PR	(Denmark) K Pless	2	6	1	2
Q	(Colombia) A Falla	6	4	6	6
(France) R Gasquet	4	5	6^{1}
8	(Argentina) D Nalbandian	6	7	7^{7}

Second round
10	(France) S Grosjean	6^{6}	3	4
Q	(Italy) P Starace	7^{8}	6	6
(Spain) F Mantilla	4	6	2	7^{7}	9
20	(Russia) M Safin	6	2	6	6^{4}	11
25	(Croatia) I Ljubičić	0	6	4	2
(Austria) S Koubek	6	1	6	6
Q	(Colombia) A Falla	7	0	2	0
8	(Argentina) D Nalbandian	5	6	6	6

Third round
Q	(Italy) P Starace	7^{7}	4	6	5	5
20	(Russia) M Safin	6^{4}	6	3	7	7
(Austria) S Koubek	7^{7}	3	6^{1}	5
8	(Argentina) D Nalbandian	6^{1}	6	7^{7}	7

Fourth round
20	(Russia) M Safin	5	4	7^{7}	3
8	(Argentina) D Nalbandian	7	6	6^{5}	6

==== Section 3 ====
First round
4	(Spain) JC Ferrero	3	6	6	6
PR	(Germany) T Haas	6	4	4	2
(Czech Republic) J Vacek	3	1	4
(Russia) I Andreev	6	6	6
(Belgium) O Rochus	1	1	3
(Spain) D Ferrer	6	6	6
(France) J Benneteau	7	7	1	6
29	(Belarus) M Mirnyi	5	5	6	3
24	(Sweden) J Björkman	6	2	6	3	6
(United States) T Dent	3	6	3	6	2
(Denmark) K Carlsen	2	3	4
(Sweden) T Enqvist	6	6	6
(Argentina) G Cañas	2	6	6	3	2
(Argentina) G Gaudio	6	2	4	6	6
(France) A Dupuis	4	4	7^{7}	3
14	(Czech Republic) J Novák	6	6	6^{4}	6

Second round
4	(Spain) JC Ferrero	4	2	3
(Russia) I Andreev	6	6	6
(Spain) D Ferrer	3	6	2	5
(France) J Benneteau	6	1	6	7
24	(Sweden) J Björkman	3	6	6^{8}	3
(Sweden) T Enqvist	6	3	7^{10}	6
(Argentina) G Gaudio	2	6	6	5	6
14	(Czech Republic) J Novák	6	4	4	7	3

Third round
(Russia) I Andreev	7^{7}	7^{7}	6
(France) J Benneteau	6^{3}	6^{3}	3
(Sweden) T Enqvist	0	4	7^{7}	4
(Argentina) G Gaudio	6	6	6^{5}	6

Fourth round
(Russia) I Andreev	4	5	3
(Argentina) G Gaudio	6	7	6

==== Section 4 ====
First round
12	(Australia) L Hewitt	6	7^{7}	4	6
WC	(France) A di Pasquale	0	6^{5}	6	1
(Austria) J Melzer	6^{4}	6	6	6
(South Africa) W Ferreira	7^{7}	2	4	3
(Romania) V Hănescu	7	6	6
WC	(France) J-R Lisnard	5	2	4
WC	(France) J Boutter	5	3	1
19	(Netherlands) M Verkerk	7	6	6
26	(Spain) A Costa	6	6	6^{2}	6
(Brazil) F Saretta	2	2	7^{7}	4
(Belgium) C Rochus	6	6	6
LL	(Spain) M López	4	1	1
Q	(Germany) D Elsner	6	7^{7}	6
Q	(Austria) A Peya	1	6^{4}	2
(Belgium) X Malisse	6	7	6
7	(Germany) R Schüttler	4	5	4

Second round
12	(Australia) L Hewitt	6	6	4	6
(Austria) J Melzer	4	4	6	2
(Romania) V Hănescu	6	3	6	0	0^{r}
19	(Netherlands) M Verkerk	4	6	3	6	3
26	(Spain) A Costa	6	6	7
(Belgium) C Rochus	1	2	5
Q	(Germany) D Elsner	3	0^{r}
(Belgium) X Malisse	6	4

Third round
12	(Australia) L Hewitt	6	3	4	6	6
19	(Netherlands) M Verkerk	2	6	6	2	1
26	(Spain) A Costa	4	6	6	6^{4}	6
(Belgium) X Malisse	6	2	4	7^{7}	8

Fourth round
12	(Australia) L Hewitt	7	6	7^{8}
(Belgium) X Malisse	5	2	6^{6}

=== Bottom half ===
==== Section 5 ====
First round
5	(Spain) C Moyá	6	6	3	6
(Netherlands) J van Lottum	3	4	6	2
(Spain) F Vicente	3	7^{7}	6	6
Q	(France) M Gicquel	6	6^{4}	4	2
(Netherlands) R Sluiter	7	6	3	6
Q	(Brazil) R Mello	5	1	6	1
PR	(Czech Republic) B Ulihrach	1	1^{r}
31	(Slovakia) D Hrbatý	6	3
17	(Spain) T Robredo	6	6	6
(Spain) A Martín	3	3	2
Q	(Spain) G García López	4	6	6	6
WC	(Australia) T Reid	6	1	2	2
(Czech Republic) R Štěpánek	3	6	6	3	9
Q	(Belarus) V Voltchkov	6	2	3	6	11
Q	(Serbia and Montenegro) J Tipsarević	6	1	4	6^{3}
11	(Chile) N Massú	3	6	6	7^{7}

Second round
5	(Spain) C Moyá	6	6	6
(Spain) F Vicente	1	2	1
(Netherlands) R Sluiter	6	6	3	7^{7}
31	(Slovakia) D Hrbatý	4	4	6	6^{5}
17	(Spain) T Robredo	6	3	7	6
Q	(Spain) G García López	4	6	5	4
Q	(Belarus) V Voltchkov	3	1	0
11	(Chile) N Massú	6	6	6

Third round
5	(Spain) C Moyá	6	6	6
(Netherlands) R Sluiter	0	3	4
17	(Spain) T Robredo	6	6	6
11	(Chile) N Massú	2	0	2

Fourth round
5	(Spain) C Moyá	7^{10}	6	6
17	(Spain) T Robredo	6^{8}	4	2

==== Section 6 ====
First round
16	(Chile) F González	7^{8}	1	0	6^{5}
Q	(Germany) F Mayer	6^{6}	6	6	7^{7}
(Australia) W Arthurs	6^{7}	2	2
(France) N Escudé	7^{9}	6	6
(Russia) M Youzhny	6	6	6
(Netherlands) D van Scheppingen	0	4	2
(Spain) Ó Hernández	2	0^{r}
21	(Romania) A Pavel	6	0
30	(Argentina) M Zabaleta	7^{7}	6	6
WC	(France) S Robert	6^{4}	3	2
(Armenia) S Sargsian	6^{4}	6	4	4
(Croatia) M Ančić	7^{7}	4	6	6
Q	(Argentina) J Mónaco	6	6	5	6
(United States) A Bogomolov Jr.	1	1	7	4
(Russia) N Davydenko	4	2	0
3	(Argentina) G Coria	6	6	6

Second round
Q	(Germany) F Mayer	4	3	4
(France) N Escudé	6	6	6
(Russia) M Youzhny	6^{3}	7^{7}	1	7^{10}	6
21	(Romania) A Pavel	7^{7}	6^{4}	6	6^{8}	2
30	(Argentina) M Zabaleta	3	4	6	4
(Croatia) M Ančić	6	6	3	6
Q	(Argentina) J Mónaco	5	1	3
3	(Argentina) G Coria	7	6	6

Third round
(France) N Escudé	6	7	6^{3}	6
(Russia) M Youzhny	2	5	7^{7}	2
(Croatia) M Ančić	3	1	2
3	(Argentina) G Coria	6	6	6

Fourth round
(France) N Escudé	0	0^{r}
3	(Argentina) G Coria	6	0

==== Section 7 ====
First round
6	(United States) A Agassi	4	6^{4}	3
Q	(France) J Haehnel	6	7^{7}	6
WC	(France) M Llodra	4	6	6	6
(Germany) A Popp	6	3	4	2
Q	(France) J Jeanpierre	6	6	7
(Slovakia) K Beck	2	4	5
Q	(France) F Serra	5	6	6	6^{7}	7
27	(United States) V Spadea	7	1	4	7^{9}	9
18	(Australia) M Philippoussis	1	6^{9}	3
(Peru) L Horna	6	7^{11}	6
(Spain) G Blanco	7	7	3	6
(Spain) A Portas	5	5	6	4
(Germany) L Burgsmüller	7	6	3	6
WC	(France) N Mahut	5	3	6	1
(France) C Saulnier	6	6	6^{2}	4	3
9	(United Kingdom) T Henman	4	4	7^{7}	6	6

Second round
Q	(France) J Haehnel	3	2	6	1
WC	(France) M Llodra	6	6	3	6
Q	(France) J Jeanpierre	6	6	7
27	(United States) V Spadea	4	2	5
(Peru) L Horna	6	4	6	2	3
(Spain) G Blanco	2	6	1	6	6
(Germany) L Burgsmüller	0	3	3
9	(United Kingdom) T Henman	6	6	6

Third round
WC	(France) M Llodra	6	6	6
Q	(France) J Jeanpierre	2	2	3
(Spain) G Blanco	6^{3}	1	2
9	(United Kingdom) T Henman	7^{7}	6	6

Fourth round
WC	(France) M Llodra	7^{7}	6	4	3	7
9	(United Kingdom) T Henman	6^{2}	4	6	6	9

==== Section 8 ====
First round
13	(Thailand) P Srichaphan	6	6	3	6
(Czech Republic) T Berdych	3	4	6	1
(Spain) À Corretja	6	4	6	6
(United States) J-M Gambill	1	6	3	2
(United Kingdom) G Rusedski	6^{7}	0	0
(Spain) F Verdasco	7^{9}	6	6
(Israel) H Levy	3	1	4
22	(Argentina) JI Chela	6	6	6
32	(France) A Clément	4	3	7^{7}	6	14
(France) F Santoro	6	6	6^{5}	3	16
(Georgia (country)) I Labadze	7	7^{7}	7
(Sweden) J Johansson	5	6^{5}	5
(United States) R Ginepri	4	4	0
(France) O Mutis	6	6	6
(United States) T Martin	6^{5}	4	5
2	(United States) A Roddick	7^{7}	6	7

Second round
13	(Thailand) P Srichaphan	4	5	3
(Spain) À Corretja	6	7	6
(Spain) F Verdasco	5	2	2
22	(Argentina) JI Chela	7	6	6
(France) F Santoro	6	3	2	6	6
(Georgia (country)) I Labadze	4	6	6	1	2
(France) O Mutis	3	6	6^{5}	6	6
2	(United States) A Roddick	6	3	7^{7}	3	2

Third round
(Spain) À Corretja	4	4	6	3
22	(Argentina) JI Chela	6	6	4	6
(France) F Santoro	0	2	3
(France) O Mutis	6	6	6

Fourth round
22	(Argentina) JI Chela	4	6	7^{7}	6
(France) O Mutis	6	2	6^{5}	2

Preceded by 2004 Australian Open – Men's singles	Grand Slam men's singles	Succeeded by 2004 Wimbledon Championships – Men's singles
