= 2004 French Open – Women's doubles =

Women's doubles
- 2004 French Open

Final
- Champion: (Spain) Virginia Ruano Pascual (Argentina) Paola Suárez
- Runner-up: (Russia) Svetlana Kuznetsova (Russia) Elena Likhovtseva
- Score: 6–0, 6–3

Details
- Draw: 64 (7WC)
- Seeds: 16

Events
Singles	men	women		boys	girls
Doubles	men	women	mixed	boys	girls
WC Singles	men	women	quad
WC Doubles	men	women	quad
Legends	−45	45+	women
- French Open

Kim Clijsters and Ai Sugiyama were the defending champions, but Clijsters chose not to participate. Sugiyama played alongside Liezel Huber, but they lost in the first round to Shinobu Asagoe and Rika Fujiwara.

Virginia Ruano Pascual and Paola Suárez won the title, defeating Svetlana Kuznetsova and Elena Likhovtseva in the final 6–0, 6–3.

== Seeds ==
1. (Spain) Virginia Ruano Pascual / (Argentina) Paola Suárez (champions)
2. (Russia) Svetlana Kuznetsova / (Russia) Elena Likhovtseva (finals)
3. (South Africa) Liezel Huber / (Japan) Ai Sugiyama (first round)
4. (Russia) Nadia Petrova / (United States) Meghann Shaughnessy (quarterfinals)
5. (United States) Martina Navratilova / (United States) Lisa Raymond (semifinals)
6. (Zimbabwe) Cara Black / (Australia) Rennae Stubbs (third round)
7. (Slovakia) Janette Husárová / (Spain) Conchita Martínez (quarterfinals)
8. (Venezuela) María Vento-Kabchi / (Indonesia) Angelique Widjaja (first round)
9. (France) Marion Bartoli / (France) Émilie Loit (second round)
10. (China) Li Ting / (China) Sun Tiantian (second round)
11. (Russia) Anastasia Myskina / (Russia) Vera Zvonareva (third round)
12. (Australia) Alicia Molik / (Spain) Magüi Serna (first round)
13. (Belgium) Els Callens / (United States) Meilen Tu (second round)
14. (Switzerland) Myriam Casanova / (Austria) Patricia Wartusch (second round)
15. (Italy) Silvia Farina Elia / (Italy) Francesca Schiavone (quarterfinals)
16. (Austria) Barbara Schett / (Switzerland) Patty Schnyder (third round)

== Draw ==
Key

- Q = Qualifier
- WC = Wild card
- LL = Lucky loser
- Alt = Alternate
- ITF = ITF entry
- PR = Protected ranking
- SR = Special ranking
- SE = Special exempt
- JE = Junior exempt
- JR = Junior Accelerator Programme entrant
- CO = College Accelerator Programme entrant
- NG = Next Gen Accelerator Program entrant
- w/o = Walkover
- r = Retired
- d = Defaulted

=== Finals ===
Quarterfinals
1	(Spain) Virginia Ruano Pascual (Argentina) Paola Suárez	3	7^{7}	6
7	(Slovakia) Janette Husárová (Spain) Conchita Martínez	6	6^{2}	2
15	(Italy) Silvia Farina Elia (Italy) Francesca Schiavone	3	0
(France) Sandrine Testud (Italy) Roberta Vinci	6	6
5	(United States) Martina Navratilova (United States) Lisa Raymond	7^{7}	6
4	(Russia) Nadia Petrova (United States) Meghann Shaughnessy	6^{5}	3
(United States) Jill Craybas (Germany) Marlene Weingärtner	2	7	5
2	(Russia) Svetlana Kuznetsova (Russia) Elena Likhovtseva	6	5	7

Semifinals
1	(Spain) Virginia Ruano Pascual (Argentina) Paola Suárez	6	6
(France) Sandrine Testud (Italy) Roberta Vinci	0	1
5	(United States) Martina Navratilova (United States) Lisa Raymond	2	4
2	(Russia) Svetlana Kuznetsova (Russia) Elena Likhovtseva	6	6

Finals
1	(Spain) Virginia Ruano Pascual (Argentina) Paola Suárez	6	6
2	(Russia) Svetlana Kuznetsova (Russia) Elena Likhovtseva	0	3

=== Top half ===
==== Section 1 ====
First round
1	(Spain) V Ruano Pascual (Argentina) P Suárez	6	6
(Russia) G Fattakhetdinova (Russia) G Fokina	1	3
(United States) J Russell (Italy) M Santangelo	6	6
(Romania) R Dragomir Ilie (Argentina) L Montalvo	2	3
(Italy) Ad Serra Zanetti (Italy) An Serra Zanetti	1	6	6
(Czech Republic) I Benešová (Czech Republic) M Paštiková	6	3	2
(Czech Republic) O Blahotová (Czech Republic) G Navrátilová	3	5
16	(Austria) B Schett (Switzerland) P Schnyder	6	7
11	(Russia) A Myskina (Russia) V Zvonareva	6	6
WC	(France) P Parmentier (France) A Védy	2	1
(United States) L Granville (Sweden) Å Svensson	3	6^{8}
(Italy) R Grande (Thailand) T Tanasugarn	6	7^{10}
(Czech Republic) K Peschke (Germany) B Rittner	6^{5}	6^{4}
(Australia) L McShea (Venezuela) M Sequera	7^{7}	7^{7}
WC	(France) S Beltrame (France) C Pin	3	1
7	(Slovakia) J Husárová (Spain) C Martínez	6	6

Second round
1	(Spain) V Ruano Pascual (Argentina) P Suárez	6	6
(United States) J Russell (Italy) M Santangelo	1	2
(Italy) Ad Serra Zanetti (Italy) An Serra Zanetti	5	3
16	(Austria) B Schett (Switzerland) P Schnyder	7	6
11	(Russia) A Myskina (Russia) V Zvonareva	6	6
(Italy) R Grande (Thailand) T Tanasugarn	2	0
(Australia) L McShea (Venezuela) M Sequera	4	4
7	(Slovakia) J Husárová (Spain) C Martínez	6	6

Third round
1	(Spain) V Ruano Pascual (Argentina) P Suárez	6	3	6
16	(Austria) B Schett (Switzerland) P Schnyder	1	6	4
11	(Russia) A Myskina (Russia) V Zvonareva	2	6	2
7	(Slovakia) J Husárová (Spain) C Martínez	6	4	6

Quarterfinals
1	(Spain) V Ruano Pascual (Argentina) P Suárez	3	7^{7}	6
7	(Slovakia) J Husárová (Spain) C Martínez	6	6^{2}	2

==== Section 2 ====
First round
3	(South Africa) L Huber (Japan) A Sugiyama	1	6	3
(Japan) S Asagoe (Japan) R Fujiwara	6	1	6
(Slovenia) T Križan (Slovenia) K Srebotnik	7	7
WC	(France) S Cohen-Aloro (Luxembourg) C Schaul	5	5
WC	(France) K Chevalier (France) S Lefèvre	3	4
(Ukraine) T Perebiynis (Croatia) S Talaja	6	6
(United States) T Ashley (United States) S Perry	4	2
15	(Italy) S Farina Elia (Italy) F Schiavone	6	6
10	(China) T Li (China) T Sun	6	6
(United States) J Ditty (Germany) M Müller	4	0
(France) S Testud (Italy) R Vinci	2	6	7
WC	(Spain) A Medina Garrigues (Spain) A Sánchez Vicario	6	3	5
(United States) J Hopkins (United States) M Washington	6	6
(Ukraine) Y Beygelzimer (Belarus) T Poutchek	2	3
(Australia) N Pratt (Australia) C Wheeler	2	3
6	(Zimbabwe) C Black (Australia) R Stubbs	6	6

Second round
(Japan) S Asagoe (Japan) R Fujiwara	6	6
(Slovenia) T Križan (Slovenia) K Srebotnik	2	2
(Ukraine) T Perebiynis (Croatia) S Talaja	4	3
15	(Italy) S Farina Elia (Italy) F Schiavone	6	6
10	(China) T Li (China) T Sun	3	6^{2}
(France) S Testud (Italy) R Vinci	6	7^{7}
(United States) J Hopkins (United States) M Washington	1	4
6	(Zimbabwe) C Black (Australia) R Stubbs	6	6

Third round
(Japan) S Asagoe (Japan) R Fujiwara	3	6^{2}
15	(Italy) S Farina Elia (Italy) F Schiavone	6	7^{7}
(France) S Testud (Italy) R Vinci	6	2	6
6	(Zimbabwe) C Black (Australia) R Stubbs	4	6	4

Quarterfinals
15	(Italy) S Farina Elia (Italy) F Schiavone	3	0
(France) S Testud (Italy) R Vinci	6	6

=== Bottom half ===
==== Section 3 ====
First round
5	(United States) M Navratilova (United States) L Raymond	6	3	6
(Slovakia) L Kurhajcová (Czech Republic) L Průšová	3	6	2
(Hungary) Z Gubacsi (Hungary) K Nagy	3	1
(Italy) T Garbin (United States) S Reeves	6	6
WC	(France) S Foretz (France) V Razzano	6^{1}	3
(Australia) B Stewart (Australia) S Stosur	7	6
(Greece) E Daniilidou (Colombia) F Zuluaga	5	1
9	(France) M Bartoli (France) É Loit	7	6
13	(Belgium) E Callens (United States) M Tu	6	6
(Bosnia and Herzegovina) M Jugić-Salkić (Croatia) D Jurak	3	4
(Czech Republic) D Chládková (Russia) E Dementieva	6	7^{7}
WC	(France) V Pichet (France) C Rousseau	3	6^{4}
(Italy) ME Camerin (Russia) A Jidkova	6	6
(Hungary) P Mandula (Ukraine) E Tatarkova	4	0
(Estonia) M Ani (Switzerland) E Gagliardi	1	1
4	(Russia) N Petrova (United States) M Shaughnessy	6	6

Second round
5	(United States) M Navratilova (United States) L Raymond	6	0
(Italy) T Garbin (United States) S Reeves	2	0^{r}
(Australia) B Stewart (Australia) S Stosur	2	6	6
9	(France) M Bartoli (France) É Loit	6	3	3
13	(Belgium) E Callens (United States) M Tu	4	2
(Czech Republic) D Chládková (Russia) E Dementieva	6	6
(Italy) ME Camerin (Russia) A Jidkova	0	0
4	(Russia) N Petrova (United States) M Shaughnessy	6	6

Third round
5	(United States) M Navratilova (United States) L Raymond	6	6
(Australia) B Stewart (Australia) S Stosur	2	3
(Czech Republic) D Chládková (Russia) E Dementieva	4	4
4	(Russia) N Petrova (United States) M Shaughnessy	6	6

Quarterfinals
5	(United States) M Navratilova (United States) L Raymond	7^{7}	6
4	(Russia) N Petrova (United States) M Shaughnessy	6^{5}	3

==== Section 4 ====
First round
8	(Venezuela) M Vento-Kabchi (Indonesia) A Widjaja	1	1
(Slovakia) D Hantuchová (Russia) D Safina	6	6
(United States) J Craybas (Germany) M Weingärtner	6	6
(Spain) C Martínez Granados (Spain) A Parra Santonja	3	4
(Croatia) J Kostanić (Slovakia) H Nagyová	6	7
(Bulgaria) L Bacheva (France) C Dhenin	3	5
(United States) B Mattek (United States) A Spears	6	6^{5}	6
12	(Australia) A Molik (Spain) M Serna	3	7^{7}	3
14	(Switzerland) M Casanova (Austria) P Wartusch	6	6
(Russia) E Kulikovskaya (Belarus) D Kustova	2	2
(China) Z Yan (China) J Zheng	7^{7}	3	3
(Argentina) G Dulko (Argentina) P Tarabini	6^{3}	6	6
(United States) A Cargill (Japan) N Miyagi	6	0
(Canada) S Jeyaseelan (Bulgaria) M Maleeva	1	0^{r}
(Chinese Taipei) J Lee (United States) J Lehnhoff	7^{7}	2	2
2	(Russia) S Kuznetsova (Russia) E Likhovtseva	6^{3}	6	6

Second round
(Slovakia) D Hantuchová (Russia) D Safina	1	2
(United States) J Craybas (Germany) M Weingärtner	6	6
(Croatia) J Kostanić (Slovakia) H Nagyová	2	5
(United States) B Mattek (United States) A Spears	6	7
14	(Switzerland) M Casanova (Austria) P Wartusch	4	2
(Argentina) G Dulko (Argentina) P Tarabini	6	6
(United States) A Cargill (Japan) N Miyagi	4	2
2	(Russia) S Kuznetsova (Russia) E Likhovtseva	6	6

Third round
(United States) J Craybas (Germany) M Weingärtner	6	6^{3}	6
(United States) B Mattek (United States) A Spears	4	7^{7}	4
(Argentina) G Dulko (Argentina) P Tarabini	6^{5}	6	4
2	(Russia) S Kuznetsova (Russia) E Likhovtseva	7^{7}	4	6

Quarterfinals
(United States) J Craybas (Germany) M Weingärtner	2	7	5
2	(Russia) S Kuznetsova (Russia) E Likhovtseva	6	5	7
