= 2003 Australian Open – Men's singles qualifying =

Men's singles qualifying
- 2003 Australian Open

Events
Singles	men	women		boys	girls
Doubles	men	women	mixed	boys	girls
WC Singles	men	women	quad
WC Doubles	men	women	quad
Legends	men	women	mixed

Qualification
Singles	men	women
- Australian Open

This article displays the qualifying draw for men's singles at the 2003 Australian Open.

== Seeds ==
1. (Netherlands) John van Lottum (second round)
2. (Belgium) Kristof Vliegen (second round)
3. (Germany) Alexander Waske (qualified)
4. (Switzerland) Ivo Heuberger (first round, retired)
5. (Israel) Noam Okun (second round)
6. (France) Nicolas Coutelot (first round)
7. (Italy) Stefano Galvani (first round)
8. (France) Grégory Carraz (qualifying competition, lucky loser)
9. (France) Nicolas Thomann (qualifying competition)
10. (France) Jean-François Bachelot (first round)
11. (Belgium) Christophe Rochus (qualified)
12. (Germany) Tomas Behrend (first round)
13. (Japan) Takao Suzuki (second round)
14. (United States) Jack Brasington (qualified)
15. (Brazil) Ricardo Mello (second round)
16. (Russia) Andrei Stoliarov (qualifying competition)
17. (Sweden) Andreas Vinciguerra (qualified)
18. (Spain) Álex Calatrava (first round)
19. (Czech Republic) Tomáš Zíb (first round)
20. (Sweden) Björn Rehnquist (first round)
21. (Germany) Björn Phau (qualified)
22. (Russia) Igor Kunitsyn (first round)
23. (Austria) Werner Eschauer (second round)
24. (Croatia) Mario Radić (first round)
25. (Sweden) Magnus Larsson (qualified)
26. (Italy) Filippo Volandri (qualifying competition)
27. (France) Julien Varlet (qualified)
28. (United Kingdom) Arvind Parmar (second round)
29. (France) Cyril Saulnier (qualifying competition)
30. (Croatia) Lovro Zovko (first round)
31. (Germany) Michael Kohlmann (second round)
32. (Sweden) Robin Söderling (second round)

== Qualifiers ==
1. (United States) Alex Bogomolov Jr.
2. (Sweden) Magnus Larsson
3. (Germany) Alexander Waske
4. (Uzbekistan) Vadim Kutsenko
5. (France) Julien Benneteau
6. (Brazil) Marcos Daniel
7. (Sweden) Andreas Vinciguerra
8. (Germany) Björn Phau
9. (Germany) David Prinosil
10. (Australia) Jaymon Crabb
11. (Belgium) Christophe Rochus
12. (Australia) Todd Larkham
13. (Italy) Renzo Furlan
14. (United States) Jack Brasington
15. (France) Julien Varlet
16. (Sweden) Joachim Johansson

== Lucky losers ==
1. (France) Grégory Carraz

== Draw ==
=== First qualifier ===
First round
1	(Netherlands) John van Lottum	6	6
(Argentina) Federico Browne	2	4
(Argentina) Diego Moyano	6	6^{9}	6
(Switzerland) Yves Allegro	1	7^{11}	4
(United States) Alex Bogomolov Jr.	6	6
(Czech Republic) Ota Fukárek	1	1
(Argentina) Juan Pablo Guzmán	3	1
31	(Germany) Michael Kohlmann	6	6

Second round
1	(Netherlands) John van Lottum	6	5	4
(Argentina) Diego Moyano	4	7	6
(United States) Alex Bogomolov Jr.	6	4	7
31	(Germany) Michael Kohlmann	4	6	5

Qualifying competition
(Argentina) Diego Moyano	6	0	1
(United States) Alex Bogomolov Jr.	2	6	6

=== Second qualifier ===
First round
2	(Belgium) Kristof Vliegen	6	6
(Spain) Quino Muñoz	2	2
(Russia) Dmitry Tursunov	6	6
(Italy) Massimo Dell'Acqua	2	0
(Slovakia) Ladislav Švarc	6	4	3
(Brazil) Pedro Braga	4	6	6
(France) Sébastien de Chaunac	3	6^{5}
25	(Sweden) Magnus Larsson	6	7^{7}

Second round
2	(Belgium) Kristof Vliegen	6	4	3
(Russia) Dmitry Tursunov	4	6	6
(Brazil) Pedro Braga	2	6	2
25	(Sweden) Magnus Larsson	6	3	6

Qualifying competition
(Russia) Dmitry Tursunov	4	4
25	(Sweden) Magnus Larsson	6	6

=== Third qualifier ===
First round
3	(Germany) Alexander Waske	6	6
(Australia) Raphael Durek	4	4
(Argentina) Ignacio Hirigoyen	7^{7}	6
(Norway) Jan Frode Andersen	6^{4}	3
(United States) Jeff Salzenstein	7	6
(New Zealand) Daniel Willman	5	2
(Azerbaijan) Emin Ağayev	5	6	3
23	(Austria) Werner Eschauer	7	2	6

Second round
3	(Germany) Alexander Waske	6	6
(Argentina) Ignacio Hirigoyen	3	4
(United States) Jeff Salzenstein	6	6
23	(Austria) Werner Eschauer	4	2

Qualifying competition
3	(Germany) Alexander Waske	6	3	13
(United States) Jeff Salzenstein	4	6	11

=== Fourth qualifier ===
First round
4	(Switzerland) Ivo Heuberger	1^{r}
(Uzbekistan) Vadim Kutsenko	3
(Spain) Salvador Navarro	5	6	3
(Romania) Răzvan Sabău	7	3	6
(South Africa) Neville Godwin	6	6
WC	(Australia) Paul Baccanello	4	3
(France) Slimane Saoudi	6	2	6
19	(Czech Republic) Tomáš Zíb	3	6	4

Second round
(Uzbekistan) Vadim Kutsenko	6	6
(Romania) Răzvan Sabău	4	2
(South Africa) Neville Godwin	6	5	6
(France) Slimane Saoudi	4	7	0

Qualifying competition
(Uzbekistan) Vadim Kutsenko	7^{7}	3	6
(South Africa) Neville Godwin	6^{2}	6	4

=== Fifth qualifier ===
First round
5	(Israel) Noam Okun	6	6
(Italy) Leonardo Azzaro	2	0
(Germany) Christopher Kas	6	3	3
(France) Julien Benneteau	4	6	6
(United States) Kevin Kim	7	5	6
(Federal Republic of Yugoslavia) Nenad Zimonjić	5	7	1
WC	(Australia) Jordan Kerr	0	1
26	(Italy) Filippo Volandri	6	6

Second round
5	(Israel) Noam Okun	1	2
(France) Julien Benneteau	6	6
(United States) Kevin Kim	5	4
26	(Italy) Filippo Volandri	7	6

Qualifying competition
(France) Julien Benneteau	6	7
26	(Italy) Filippo Volandri	2	5

=== Sixth qualifier ===
First round
6	(France) Nicolas Coutelot	4	6	3
(Greece) Konstantinos Economidis	6	1	6
(Spain) Juan Giner	1	3
(Czech Republic) Michal Tabara	6	6
(South Africa) Louis Vosloo	7^{8}	7^{7}
(Greece) Nikos Rovas	6^{6}	6^{3}
(Brazil) Marcos Daniel	6	6
18	(Spain) Álex Calatrava	4	4

Second round
(Greece) Konstantinos Economidis	7^{7}	6
(Czech Republic) Michal Tabara	6^{2}	1
(South Africa) Louis Vosloo	2	3
(Brazil) Marcos Daniel	6	6

Qualifying competition
(Greece) Konstantinos Economidis	2	4
(Brazil) Marcos Daniel	6	6

=== Seventh qualifier ===
First round
7	(Italy) Stefano Galvani	3	4
(Romania) Gabriel Trifu	6	6
WC	(Australia) Alun Jones	6	6
(Argentina) Sebastián Prieto	3	1
WC	(Australia) Adam Kennedy	6	6
WC	(Australia) Adam Feeney	4	4
(Brazil) Francisco Costa	3	4
17	(Sweden) Andreas Vinciguerra	6	6

Second round
(Romania) Gabriel Trifu	1	1
WC	(Australia) Alun Jones	6	6
WC	(Australia) Adam Kennedy	4	3
17	(Sweden) Andreas Vinciguerra	6	6

Qualifying competition
WC	(Australia) Alun Jones	6	2	2
17	(Sweden) Andreas Vinciguerra	4	6	6

=== Eighth qualifier ===
First round
8	(France) Grégory Carraz	6	6
(South Africa) Wesley Moodie	4	4
(Slovakia) Branislav Sekáč	6	7
(Germany) Christian Vinck	4	5
(Ecuador) Giovanni Lapentti	6	6
(Switzerland) Marco Chiudinelli	4	4
(France) Marc Gicquel	2	3
21	(Germany) Björn Phau	6	6

Second round
8	(France) Grégory Carraz	6	6
(Slovakia) Branislav Sekáč	3	2
(Ecuador) Giovanni Lapentti	6	4	9
21	(Germany) Björn Phau	4	6	11

Qualifying competition
8	(France) Grégory Carraz	4	5
21	(Germany) Björn Phau	6	7

=== Ninth qualifier ===
First round
9	(France) Nicolas Thomann	6	6
(Australia) Robert Smeets	3	1
WC	(Australia) Domenic Marafiote	4	4
(France) Éric Prodon	6	6
(Czech Republic) Petr Luxa	6	0	3
(Germany) David Prinosil	4	6	6
(Germany) Markus Hantschk	3	6	6
24	(Croatia) Mario Radić	6	1	2

Second round
9	(France) Nicolas Thomann	7	6
(France) Éric Prodon	5	4
(Germany) David Prinosil	7^{10}	6
(Germany) Markus Hantschk	6^{8}	4

Qualifying competition
9	(France) Nicolas Thomann	6	3	9
(Germany) David Prinosil	1	6	11

=== Tenth qualifier ===
First round
10	(France) Jean-François Bachelot	0	5
WC	(Australia) Jaymon Crabb	6	7
WC	(Australia) Luke Bourgeois	3	5
(Slovenia) Marko Tkalec	6	7
(France) Lionel Roux	3	2
(Zimbabwe) Wayne Black	6	6
(Italy) Stefano Pescosolido	4	6	4
29	(France) Cyril Saulnier	6	4	6

Second round
WC	(Australia) Jaymon Crabb	1	6	6
(Slovenia) Marko Tkalec	6	4	3
(Zimbabwe) Wayne Black	2	5
29	(France) Cyril Saulnier	6	7

Qualifying competition
WC	(Australia) Jaymon Crabb	3	6	6
29	(France) Cyril Saulnier	6	2	3

=== Eleventh qualifier ===
First round
11	(Belgium) Christophe Rochus	7^{7}	6
(Greece) Vasilis Mazarakis	6^{4}	3
(Finland) Tuomas Ketola	7^{7}	6^{6}	7
(Australia) Morgan Wilson	6^{5}	7^{8}	5
(Israel) Amir Hadad	6	6
(Japan) Michihisa Onoda	4	2
(Russia) Yuri Schukin	2	6^{8}
28	(United Kingdom) Arvind Parmar	6	7^{10}

Second round
11	(Belgium) Christophe Rochus	5	7^{7}	11
(Finland) Tuomas Ketola	7	6^{3}	9
(Israel) Amir Hadad	6	7
28	(United Kingdom) Arvind Parmar	1	5

Qualifying competition
11	(Belgium) Christophe Rochus	6	6
(Israel) Amir Hadad	1	0

=== Twelfth qualifier ===
First round
12	(Germany) Tomas Behrend	3	6^{6}
(France) Florent Serra	6	7^{8}
(Thailand) Danai Udomchoke	6^{4}	0
(Australia) Todd Larkham	7^{7}	6
WC	(Australia) Ben Ellwood	2	3
(Uzbekistan) Oleg Ogorodov	6	6
(United States) Thomas Blake	6	6
22	(Russia) Igor Kunitsyn	2	2

Second round
(France) Florent Serra	4	1
(Australia) Todd Larkham	6	6
(Uzbekistan) Oleg Ogorodov	6	4	7
(United States) Thomas Blake	1	6	5

Qualifying competition
(Australia) Todd Larkham	6	6
(Uzbekistan) Oleg Ogorodov	3	4

=== Thirteenth qualifier ===
First round
13	(Japan) Takao Suzuki	7	4	8
(Czech Republic) František Čermák	5	6	6
(Italy) Renzo Furlan	6	2	6
(Chinese Taipei) Lu Yen-hsun	2	6	4
(Brazil) Júlio Silva	7	6^{5}	1
(South Africa) Justin Bower	5	7^{7}	6
(Chinese Taipei) Wang Yeu-tzuoo	6	6
30	(Croatia) Lovro Zovko	3	2

Second round
13	(Japan) Takao Suzuki	4	2
(Italy) Renzo Furlan	6	6
(South Africa) Justin Bower	6	2	6
(Chinese Taipei) Wang Yeu-tzuoo	3	6	1

Qualifying competition
(Italy) Renzo Furlan	6	6
(South Africa) Justin Bower	4	4

=== Fourteenth qualifier ===
First round
14	(United States) Jack Brasington	6	2	6
(Argentina) Edgardo Massa	3	6	4
(Spain) Tati Rascón	5	6^{2}
(Germany) Maximilian Abel	7	7^{7}
(Czech Republic) Pavel Šnobel	6	6
(Australia) Chris Guccione	3	3
(Israel) Harel Levy	6	1	2
32	(Sweden) Robin Söderling	1	6	6

Second round
14	(United States) Jack Brasington	6	6
(Germany) Maximilian Abel	1	2
(Czech Republic) Pavel Šnobel	6	6
32	(Sweden) Robin Söderling	3	2

Qualifying competition
14	(United States) Jack Brasington	6	3	4
(Czech Republic) Pavel Šnobel	4	6	4^{r}

=== Fifteenth qualifier ===
First round
15	(Brazil) Ricardo Mello	5	6	6
(Argentina) Gastón Etlis	7	3	3
(Germany) Simon Greul	6	6
(Japan) Toshiaki Sakai	3	4
(United States) Robert Kendrick	6	3	8
(United States) Paul Goldstein	3	6	6
(Japan) Takahiro Terachi	2	7	8
27	(France) Julien Varlet	6	5	10

Second round
15	(Brazil) Ricardo Mello	5	1
(Germany) Simon Greul	7	6
(United States) Robert Kendrick	5	6	4
27	(France) Julien Varlet	7	2	6

Qualifying competition
(Germany) Simon Greul	2	3
27	(France) Julien Varlet	6	6

=== Sixteenth qualifier ===
First round
16	(Russia) Andrei Stoliarov	6	3	7
(South Africa) Rik de Voest	2	6	5
(United States) Eric Taino	7^{8}	7^{7}
(United States) Doug Bohaboy	6^{6}	6^{5}
(Sweden) Joachim Johansson	4	6	7
(Spain) Fernando Verdasco	6	4	5
(France) Olivier Patience	6	6^{7}	6
20	(Sweden) Björn Rehnquist	1	7^{9}	3

Second round
16	(Russia) Andrei Stoliarov	6^{5}	6	6
(United States) Eric Taino	7^{7}	3	4
(Sweden) Joachim Johansson	7^{7}	7^{7}
(France) Olivier Patience	6^{4}	6^{3}

Qualifying competition
16	(Russia) Andrei Stoliarov	6	4	4
(Sweden) Joachim Johansson	4	6	6
