= 2003 Australian Open – Women's singles qualifying =

Women's singles qualifying
- 2003 Australian Open

Events
Singles	men	women		boys	girls
Doubles	men	women	mixed	boys	girls
WC Singles	men	women	quad
WC Doubles	men	women	quad
Legends	men	women	mixed

Qualification
Singles	men	women
- Australian Open

This article displays the qualifying draw for women's singles at the 2003 Australian Open.

== Seeds ==
1. (United States) Ashley Harkleroad (second round)
2. (Venezuela) Milagros Sequera (second round)
3. (Czech Republic) Klára Koukalová (qualified)
4. (Ukraine) Tatiana Perebiynis (first round)
5. (Hungary) Zsófia Gubacsi (first round)
6. (Russia) Anastasia Rodionova (first round)
7. (United States) Ansley Cargill (qualified)
8. (United States) Lindsay Lee-Waters (qualified)
9. (Italy) Maria Elena Camerin (first round)
10. (Czech Republic) Renata Voráčová (first round)
11. (Japan) Saori Obata (qualifying competition)
12. (Czech Republic) Zuzana Ondrášková (first round)
13. (Germany) Jana Kandarr (first round)
14. (Argentina) María Emilia Salerni (qualified)
15. (Ukraine) Julia Vakulenko (qualifying competition)
16. (Luxembourg) Claudine Schaul (qualifying competition)
17. (Spain) Ángeles Montolio (first round)
18. (South Korea) Jeon Mi-ra (first round)
19. (Czech Republic) Sandra Kleinová (second round)
20. (Austria) Barbara Schwartz (qualified)
21. (Hungary) Katalin Marosi (first round)
22. (Canada) Vanessa Webb (qualified)
23. (Russia) Lina Krasnoroutskaya (qualifying competition)
24. (Netherlands) Kristie Boogert (first round)

== Qualifiers ==
1. (Canada) Vanessa Webb
2. (Slovakia) Eva Fislová
3. (Czech Republic) Klára Koukalová
4. (Austria) Barbara Schwartz
5. (Slovakia) Stanislava Hrozenská
6. (Hungary) Melinda Czink
7. (United States) Ansley Cargill
8. (United States) Lindsay Lee-Waters
9. (Spain) Nuria Llagostera Vives
10. (Russia) Maria Sharapova
11. (Argentina) María Emilia Salerni
12. (Federal Republic of Yugoslavia) Jelena Janković

== Draw ==
=== First qualifier ===
First round
1	(United States) Ashley Harkleroad	6	6
(Netherlands) Anousjka van Exel	4	1
(Colombia) Catalina Castaño	3	6	0
(United States) Sunitha Rao	6	4	6
WC	(Australia) Lauren Cheung	0	2
(United States) Teryn Ashley	6	6
(Australia) Cindy Watson	0	3
22	(Canada) Vanessa Webb	6	6

Second round
1	(United States) Ashley Harkleroad	2	6	3
(United States) Sunitha Rao	6	4	6
(United States) Teryn Ashley	6^{4}	5
22	(Canada) Vanessa Webb	7^{7}	7

Qualifying competition
(United States) Sunitha Rao	6^{5}	2
22	(Canada) Vanessa Webb	7^{7}	6

=== Second qualifier ===
First round
2	(Venezuela) Milagros Sequera	6	6
(United States) Jennifer Hopkins	4	4
(United States) Brie Rippner	2	2
(Slovakia) Eva Fislová	6	6
(Russia) Galina Fokina	6	6
(Tunisia) Selima Sfar	2	1
(United Kingdom) Julie Pullin	4	3
16	(Luxembourg) Claudine Schaul	6	6

Second round
2	(Venezuela) Milagros Sequera	2	6	1
(Slovakia) Eva Fislová	6	4	6
(Russia) Galina Fokina	3	5
16	(Luxembourg) Claudine Schaul	6	7

Qualifying competition
(Slovakia) Eva Fislová	5	6	6
16	(Luxembourg) Claudine Schaul	7	2	2

=== Third qualifier ===
First round
3	(Czech Republic) Klára Koukalová	6	7
(Republic of Ireland) Kelly Liggan	4	5
(Australia) Christina Wheeler	6	6
(Czech Republic) Lenka Němečková	3	1
(Czech Republic) Barbora Strýcová	6	6^{4}	6
(Spain) Arantxa Parra Santonja	4	7^{7}	0
(Hungary) Rita Kuti-Kis	5	3
15	(Ukraine) Julia Vakulenko	7	6

Second round
3	(Czech Republic) Klára Koukalová	6	6
(Australia) Christina Wheeler	2	1
(Czech Republic) Barbora Strýcová	2	2
15	(Ukraine) Julia Vakulenko	6	6

Qualifying competition
3	(Czech Republic) Klára Koukalová	6	7^{7}
15	(Ukraine) Julia Vakulenko	4	6^{4}

=== Fourth qualifier ===
First round
4	(Ukraine) Tatiana Perebiynis	0	3
WC	(Australia) Lauren Breadmore	6	6
WC	(Australia) Gabrielle Baker	2	6^{5}
(Romania) Andreea Vanc	6	7^{7}
(Italy) Francesca Lubiani	1	3
(South Africa) Natalie Grandin	6	6
(Japan) Yuka Yoshida	1	1
20	(Austria) Barbara Schwartz	6	6

Second round
WC	(Australia) Lauren Breadmore	7^{8}	6^{3}	5
(Romania) Andreea Vanc	6^{6}	7^{7}	7
(South Africa) Natalie Grandin	6	2	4
20	(Austria) Barbara Schwartz	4	6	6

Qualifying competition
(Romania) Andreea Vanc	1	1
20	(Austria) Barbara Schwartz	6	6

=== Fifth qualifier ===
First round
5	(Hungary) Zsófia Gubacsi	4	2
(United States) Lilia Osterloh	6	6
(Ukraine) Yuliana Fedak	3	0
(Slovakia) Stanislava Hrozenská	6	6
(Russia) Oxana Karyshkova	6	0	5
(Ukraine) Alona Bondarenko	3	6	7
(Japan) Rika Fujiwara	6^{5}	4
23	(Russia) Lina Krasnoroutskaya	7^{7}	6

Second round
(United States) Lilia Osterloh	0	2
(Slovakia) Stanislava Hrozenská	6	6
(Ukraine) Alona Bondarenko	1	2
23	(Russia) Lina Krasnoroutskaya	6	6

Qualifying competition
(Slovakia) Stanislava Hrozenská	7	6
23	(Russia) Lina Krasnoroutskaya	5	3

=== Sixth qualifier ===
First round
6	(Russia) Anastasia Rodionova	1	6	2
(Hungary) Melinda Czink	6	2	6
WC	(Australia) Tiffany Welford	6^{4}	2
(France) Céline Beigbeder	7^{7}	6
(Hungary) Kira Nagy	1	2
(Italy) Roberta Vinci	6	6
(Italy) Mara Santangelo	6	7^{7}
18	(South Korea) Jeon Mi-ra	3	6^{2}

Second round
(Hungary) Melinda Czink	6	6
(France) Céline Beigbeder	0	1
(Italy) Roberta Vinci	3	4
(Italy) Mara Santangelo	6	6

Qualifying competition
(Hungary) Melinda Czink	6	2	6
(Italy) Mara Santangelo	2	6	1

=== Seventh qualifier ===
First round
7	(United States) Ansley Cargill	6^{1}	6	6
(Italy) Nathalie Viérin	7^{7}	3	1
(Estonia) Maret Ani	4	6	6
(Germany) Vanessa Henke	6	4	0
(Venezuela) María Vento-Kabchi	5	1
(South Africa) Chanelle Scheepers	7	6
(Netherlands) Seda Noorlander	4	6	6
21	(Hungary) Katalin Marosi	6	3	3

Second round
7	(United States) Ansley Cargill	4	6	6
(Estonia) Maret Ani	6	3	4
(South Africa) Chanelle Scheepers	6	4	2
(Netherlands) Seda Noorlander	3	6	6

Qualifying competition
7	(United States) Ansley Cargill	6	6
(Netherlands) Seda Noorlander	2	1

=== Eighth qualifier ===
First round
8	(United States) Lindsay Lee-Waters	6	6
(Austria) Sybille Bammer	3	0
(China) Zheng Jie	3	6^{5}
(Bulgaria) Svetlana Krivencheva	6	7^{7}
(Czech Republic) Olga Blahotová	4	1
(Australia) Amanda Grahame	6	6
(Ukraine) Elena Tatarkova	3	6	6
13	(Germany) Jana Kandarr	6	4	2

Second round
8	(United States) Lindsay Lee-Waters	6	6
(Bulgaria) Svetlana Krivencheva	3	0
(Australia) Amanda Grahame	1	2
(Ukraine) Elena Tatarkova	6	6

Qualifying competition
8	(United States) Lindsay Lee-Waters	6	6
(Ukraine) Elena Tatarkova	0	2

=== Ninth qualifier ===
First round
9	(Italy) Maria Elena Camerin	2	3
(Spain) Nuria Llagostera Vives	6	6
(Argentina) Natalia Gussoni	2	3
(Belarus) Nadejda Ostrovskaya	6	6
(Germany) Angelika Bachmann	4	2
(Ukraine) Yuliya Beygelzimer	6	6
(Canada) Marie-Ève Pelletier	6	4	6
24	(Netherlands) Kristie Boogert	3	6	4

Second round
(Spain) Nuria Llagostera Vives	6	6
(Belarus) Nadejda Ostrovskaya	3	4
(Ukraine) Yuliya Beygelzimer	5	0
(Canada) Marie-Ève Pelletier	7	6

Qualifying competition
(Spain) Nuria Llagostera Vives	2	6	6
(Canada) Marie-Ève Pelletier	6	4	3

=== Tenth qualifier ===
First round
10	(Czech Republic) Renata Voráčová	3	5
(Russia) Maria Sharapova	6	7
(Russia) Maria Goloviznina	6	6
WC	(Australia) Olivia Lukaszewicz	1	0
WC	(Australia) Sophie Ferguson	0	3
(Czech Republic) Alena Vašková	6	6
(Chinese Taipei) Janet Lee	6	6
17	(Spain) Ángeles Montolio	3	4

Second round
(Russia) Maria Sharapova	6	6
(Russia) Maria Goloviznina	3	2
(Czech Republic) Alena Vašková	6	6
(Chinese Taipei) Janet Lee	3	4

Qualifying competition
(Russia) Maria Sharapova	6	6
(Czech Republic) Alena Vašková	1	2

=== Eleventh qualifier ===
First round
11	(Japan) Saori Obata	6	7
(Australia) Bryanne Stewart	1	5
(Germany) Sandra Klösel	7^{7}	6
WC	(United Kingdom) Anne Keothavong	6^{0}	3
(United States) Kristina Brandi	7	6
WC	(Australia) Daniella Dominikovic	5	1
(Slovakia) Zuzana Kučová	2	1
14	(Argentina) María Emilia Salerni	6	6

Second round
11	(Japan) Saori Obata	6	1	6
(Germany) Sandra Klösel	3	6	2
(United States) Kristina Brandi	5	0
14	(Argentina) María Emilia Salerni	7	6

Qualifying competition
11	(Japan) Saori Obata	3	5
14	(Argentina) María Emilia Salerni	6	7

=== Twelfth qualifier ===
First round
12	(Czech Republic) Zuzana Ondrášková	1	3
(Sweden) Sofia Arvidsson	6	6
(Israel) Tzipora Obziler	6	7
(United States) Tara Snyder	3	5
(Bulgaria) Maria Geznenge	0	6	3
(Federal Republic of Yugoslavia) Jelena Janković	6	1	6
(United Kingdom) Lucie Ahl	5	0
19	(Czech Republic) Sandra Kleinová	7	6

Second round
(Sweden) Sofia Arvidsson	6	4	2
(Israel) Tzipora Obziler	4	6	6
(Federal Republic of Yugoslavia) Jelena Janković	6	6
19	(Czech Republic) Sandra Kleinová	3	1

Qualifying competition
(Israel) Tzipora Obziler	4	4
(Federal Republic of Yugoslavia) Jelena Janković	6	6
