= Kucova =

Kucova may refer to:

- Kučová, a Slovak surname
  - Zuzana Kučová (born 1982), a Slovak tennis player
  - Kristína Kučová (born 1990), a Slovak tennis player
- Kuçova (Kuçovë), a municipality in Albania
