= 2003 French Open – Men's singles qualifying =

Men's singles qualifying
- 2003 French Open

Events
Singles	men	women		boys	girls
Doubles	men	women	mixed	boys	girls
WC Singles	men	women	quad
WC Doubles	men	women	quad
Legends	−45	45+	women

Qualification
Singles	men	women
- French Open

This article displays the qualifying draw for the Men's Singles at the 2003 French Open.

== Seeds ==
1. (Italy) Filippo Volandri (qualifying competition, lucky loser)
2. (Belgium) Christophe Rochus (qualified)
3. (Belgium) Kristof Vliegen (first round)
4. (Brazil) Fernando Meligeni (first round)
5. (United States) Alex Bogomolov Jr. (first round)
6. (Brazil) Ricardo Mello (first round)
7. (Germany) Alexander Waske (qualified)
8. (Italy) Giorgio Galimberti (qualifying competition, lucky loser)
9. (Spain) Rubén Ramírez Hidalgo (second round)
10. (Belgium) Dick Norman (qualified)
11. (Austria) Werner Eschauer (first round)
12. (France) Nicolas Thomann (first round)
13. (Romania) Victor Hănescu (qualified)
14. (Peru) Iván Miranda (first round)
15. (France) Grégory Carraz (first round)
16. (Spain) Fernando Verdasco (first round)
17. (Philippines) Cecil Mamiit (moved to main draw)
18. (Russia) Andrei Stoliarov (first round)
19. (Argentina) Sergio Roitman (qualifying competition, lucky loser)
20. (Australia) Peter Luczak (second round)
21. (Switzerland) Ivo Heuberger (qualifying competition, lucky loser)
22. (Austria) Julian Knowle (first round)
23. (Hungary) Attila Sávolt (qualified)
24. (Spain) Galo Blanco (qualified)
25. (Costa Rica) Juan Antonio Marín (first round)
26. (Czech Republic) Tomáš Zíb (qualifying competition)
27. (Netherlands) Dennis van Scheppingen (first round)
28. (Italy) Andrea Gaudenzi (second round)
29. (Russia) Igor Kunitsyn (second round)
30. (Argentina) Federico Browne (qualified)
31. (Uzbekistan) Vadim Kutsenko (qualifying competition)
32. (Italy) Stefano Galvani (first round)

== Qualifiers ==
1. (France) Julien Varlet
2. (Belgium) Christophe Rochus
3. (Chile) Hermes Gamonal
4. (Australia) Todd Larkham
5. (Spain) Marc López
6. (Spain) Galo Blanco
7. (Germany) Alexander Waske
8. (Hungary) Attila Sávolt
9. (Ecuador) Giovanni Lapentti
10. (Belgium) Dick Norman
11. (France) Nicolas Coutelot
12. (United States) Alex Kim
13. (Romania) Victor Hănescu
14. (Argentina) Mariano Delfino
15. (Spain) Álex Calatrava
16. (Argentina) Federico Browne

== Lucky losers ==
1. (Italy) Filippo Volandri
2. (Italy) Giorgio Galimberti
3. (Argentina) Sergio Roitman
4. (Switzerland) Ivo Heuberger

== Qualifying draw ==
Key

- Q = Qualifier
- WC = Wild card
- LL = Lucky loser
- Alt = Alternate
- ITF = ITF entry
- PR = Protected ranking
- SR = Special ranking
- SE = Special exempt
- JE = Junior exempt
- JR = Junior Accelerator Programme entrant
- CO = College Accelerator Programme entrant
- NG = Next Gen Accelerator Program entrant
- w/o = Walkover
- r = Retired
- d = Defaulted

=== First qualifier ===
First round
1	(Italy) Filippo Volandri	7^{7}	6
PR	(Israel) Andy Ram	6^{5}	2
PR	(Republic of Ireland) Peter Clarke	2	2
(Switzerland) George Bastl	6	6
(Spain) Juan Giner	1	1
(France) Julien Varlet	6	6
(Germany) Markus Hantschk	6	4
27	(Netherlands) Dennis van Scheppingen	1	1^{r}

Second round
1	(Italy) Filippo Volandri	7	3	6
(Switzerland) George Bastl	5	6	2
(France) Julien Varlet	6	6
(Germany) Markus Hantschk	4	2

Qualifying competition
1	(Italy) Filippo Volandri	4	1
(France) Julien Varlet	6	6

=== Second qualifier ===
First round
2	(Belgium) Christophe Rochus	6	6
(Sweden) Robin Söderling	1	1
(Spain) Óscar Serrano	6	6
(Russia) Yuri Schukin	0	4
(France) Olivier Patience	6	6
(South Africa) Wesley Moodie	1	0
(Spain) Gorka Fraile	5	3
26	(Czech Republic) Tomáš Zíb	7	6

Second round
2	(Belgium) Christophe Rochus	2	6	6
(Spain) Óscar Serrano	6	3	2
(France) Olivier Patience	6^{4}	5
26	(Czech Republic) Tomáš Zíb	7^{7}	7

Qualifying competition
2	(Belgium) Christophe Rochus	4	6	8
26	(Czech Republic) Tomáš Zíb	6	2	6

=== Third qualifier ===
First round
3	(Belgium) Kristof Vliegen	4	4
(Spain) Joan Balcells	6	6
(Austria) Markus Hipfl	3	6^{2}
(France) Florent Serra	6	7^{7}
(Russia) Dmitry Tursunov	7^{7}	1	2
(Chile) Hermes Gamonal	6^{5}	6	6
(Israel) Amir Hadad	4	2
29	(Russia) Igor Kunitsyn	6	6

Second round
(Spain) Joan Balcells	7	7^{7}
(France) Florent Serra	5	6^{4}
(Chile) Hermes Gamonal	7	6
29	(Russia) Igor Kunitsyn	5	3

Qualifying competition
(Spain) Joan Balcells	1	3
(Chile) Hermes Gamonal	6	6

=== Fourth qualifier ===
First round
4	(Brazil) Fernando Meligeni	4	4
(Argentina) Marcelo Charpentier	6	6
(Czech Republic) Jiří Vaněk	6	5	1
(Australia) Todd Larkham	4	7	6
(Italy) Leonardo Azzaro	6	7
(France) Jean-François Bachelot	1	5
(Japan) Takao Suzuki	7	6
25	(Costa Rica) Juan Antonio Marín	5	2

Second round
(Argentina) Marcelo Charpentier	3^{r}
(Australia) Todd Larkham	3
(Italy) Leonardo Azzaro	4	7	6
(Japan) Takao Suzuki	6	5	2

Qualifying competition
(Australia) Todd Larkham	6	3	6
(Italy) Leonardo Azzaro	4	6	3

=== Fifth qualifier ===
First round
5	(United States) Alex Bogomolov Jr.	1	6	1
(Italy) Renzo Furlan	6	4	6
(Czech Republic) Jan Hájek	6	7
(Israel) Harel Levy	2	5
(Spain) Marc López	6	6
(Italy) Stefano Pescosolido	4	4
(Belgium) Gilles Elseneer	6	6
Alt	(Japan) Satoshi Iwabuchi	4	4

Second round
(Italy) Renzo Furlan	4	4
(Czech Republic) Jan Hájek	6	6
(Spain) Marc López	6	6
(Belgium) Gilles Elseneer	3	3

Qualifying competition
(Czech Republic) Jan Hájek	3	6	3
(Spain) Marc López	6	2	6

=== Sixth qualifier ===
First round
6	(Brazil) Ricardo Mello	6	6^{1}	4
(Serbia and Montenegro) Janko Tipsarević	3	7^{7}	6
(Finland) Tuomas Ketola	4	3
(France) Rodolphe Cadart	6	6
WC	(France) Xavier Pujo	6	6
(Argentina) Juan Pablo Guzmán	3	1
(Croatia) Lovro Zovko	2	5
24	(Spain) Galo Blanco	6	7

Second round
(Serbia and Montenegro) Janko Tipsarević	6	6
(France) Rodolphe Cadart	1	2
WC	(France) Xavier Pujo	1	3
24	(Spain) Galo Blanco	6	6

Qualifying competition
(Serbia and Montenegro) Janko Tipsarević	2	7	4
24	(Spain) Galo Blanco	6	5	6

=== Seventh qualifier ===
First round
7	(Germany) Alexander Waske	6	3	6
(Brazil) Marcos Daniel	4	6	4
(Russia) Igor Andreev	6	7^{7}
(Brazil) Francisco Costa	4	6^{4}
(Germany) Björn Phau	7^{7}	7^{7}
(Argentina) Andrés Dellatorre	6^{5}	6^{3}
(Germany) Oliver Gross	5	6	6
32	(Italy) Stefano Galvani	7	1	4

Second round
7	(Germany) Alexander Waske	6	6
(Russia) Igor Andreev	4	3
(Germany) Björn Phau	4	6	6
(Germany) Oliver Gross	6	3	4

Qualifying competition
7	(Germany) Alexander Waske	7	6
(Germany) Björn Phau	5	1

=== Eighth qualifier ===
First round
8	(Italy) Giorgio Galimberti	6	6
(United States) Eric Taino	2	1
(Austria) Alexander Peya	6	6
WC	(France) Julien Jeanpierre	4	3
(Italy) Daniele Bracciali	6^{7}	7^{7}	6
(United States) Jack Brasington	7^{9}	6^{1}	2
(Argentina) Gastón Etlis	3	6	4
23	(Hungary) Attila Sávolt	6	3	6

Second round
8	(Italy) Giorgio Galimberti	6	6
(Austria) Alexander Peya	3	2
(Italy) Daniele Bracciali	4	7^{7}	3
23	(Hungary) Attila Sávolt	6	6^{3}	6

Qualifying competition
8	(Italy) Giorgio Galimberti	3	1
23	(Hungary) Attila Sávolt	6	6

=== Ninth qualifier ===
First round
9	(Spain) Rubén Ramírez Hidalgo	6	6
(Germany) Maximilian Abel	3	2
(Australia) Joseph Sirianni	3	4
(Ecuador) Giovanni Lapentti	6	6
(United States) Kevin Kim	6	6
(Thailand) Danai Udomchoke	1	4
(United States) Jeff Salzenstein	6	6
22	(Austria) Julian Knowle	4	3

Second round
9	(Spain) Rubén Ramírez Hidalgo	4	0
(Ecuador) Giovanni Lapentti	6	6
(United States) Kevin Kim	6	6
(United States) Jeff Salzenstein	3	3

Qualifying competition
(Ecuador) Giovanni Lapentti	6	6
(United States) Kevin Kim	1	4

=== Tenth qualifier ===
First round
10	(Belgium) Dick Norman	6	7
(Russia) Dmitry Vlasov	2	5
(South Africa) Louis Vosloo	1	6	6
(Argentina) Martín Vassallo Argüello	6	1	3
(Czech Republic) František Čermák	6	7
(Germany) David Prinosil	0	5
(Croatia) Mario Radić	2	1
31	(Uzbekistan) Vadim Kutsenko	6	6

Second round
10	(Belgium) Dick Norman	6	6
(South Africa) Louis Vosloo	4	2
(Czech Republic) František Čermák	3	2
31	(Uzbekistan) Vadim Kutsenko	6	6

Qualifying competition
10	(Belgium) Dick Norman	6	6
31	(Uzbekistan) Vadim Kutsenko	3	4

=== Eleventh qualifier ===
First round
11	(Austria) Werner Eschauer	7^{7}	1	4
(Israel) Noam Okun	6^{4}	6	6
(Czech Republic) Pavel Šnobel	0	1
(France) Nicolas Coutelot	6	6
(Brazil) Alexandre Simoni	6	6
(United Kingdom) Arvind Parmar	1	1
(Argentina) Diego Moyano	6^{6}	3
19	(Argentina) Sergio Roitman	7^{8}	6

Second round
(Israel) Noam Okun	3	4
(France) Nicolas Coutelot	6	6
(Brazil) Alexandre Simoni	4	6^{3}
19	(Argentina) Sergio Roitman	6	7^{7}

Qualifying competition
(France) Nicolas Coutelot	6	6
19	(Argentina) Sergio Roitman	2	3

=== Twelfth qualifier ===
First round
12	(France) Nicolas Thomann	6	3	3
(Sweden) Björn Rehnquist	4	6	6
(Italy) Cristiano Caratti	6^{1}	4
(United States) Alex Kim	7^{7}	6
WC	(France) Édouard Roger-Vasselin	6	3	6
(Sweden) Joachim Johansson	2	6	4
WC	(France) Julien Cassaigne	1	3
21	(Switzerland) Ivo Heuberger	6	6

Second round
(Sweden) Björn Rehnquist	3	0
(United States) Alex Kim	6	6
WC	(France) Édouard Roger-Vasselin	3	6	6
21	(Switzerland) Ivo Heuberger	6	3	8

Qualifying competition
(United States) Alex Kim	6	6
21	(Switzerland) Ivo Heuberger	3	4

=== Thirteenth qualifier ===
First round
13	(Romania) Victor Hănescu	6	6
(Croatia) Roko Karanušić	3	2
(Spain) Mariano Albert-Ferrando	6	6
(Venezuela) José de Armas	4	4
(Australia) Paul Baccanello	7^{8}	7^{7}
(France) Sébastien De Chaunac	6^{6}	6^{5}
(Switzerland) Yves Allegro	4	4
28	(Italy) Andrea Gaudenzi	6	6

Second round
13	(Romania) Victor Hănescu	4	6	6
(Spain) Mariano Albert-Ferrando	6	3	4
(Australia) Paul Baccanello	6	6
28	(Italy) Andrea Gaudenzi	4	3

Qualifying competition
13	(Romania) Victor Hănescu	7	7^{7}
(Australia) Paul Baccanello	5	6^{4}

=== Fourteenth qualifier ===
First round
14	(Peru) Iván Miranda	4	3
(Argentina) Mariano Delfino	6	6
WC	(France) Jean-Christophe Faurel	2	0
WC	(France) Jérôme Haehnel	6	6
(Croatia) Ivo Karlović	6	7^{7}
(South Africa) Rik de Voest	4	6^{5}
(Spain) Óscar Hernández	6	6
18	(Russia) Andrei Stoliarov	2	4

Second round
(Argentina) Mariano Delfino	4	6	6
WC	(France) Jérôme Haehnel	6	4	2
(Croatia) Ivo Karlović	4	2
(Spain) Óscar Hernández	6	6

Qualifying competition
(Argentina) Mariano Delfino	7^{7}	6
(Spain) Óscar Hernández	6^{4}	1

=== Fifteenth qualifier ===
First round
15	(France) Grégory Carraz	5	1
WC	(France) Jo-Wilfried Tsonga	7	6
PR	(Spain) Jacobo Díaz	3	1
(Spain) Álex Calatrava	6	6
(Luxembourg) Gilles Müller	2	2
(Algeria) Slimane Saoudi	6	6
WC	(France) Marc Gicquel	4	2
20	(Australia) Peter Luczak	6	6

Second round
WC	(France) Jo-Wilfried Tsonga	4	1
(Spain) Álex Calatrava	6	6
(Algeria) Slimane Saoudi	7^{7}	4	6
20	(Australia) Peter Luczak	6^{4}	6	2

Qualifying competition
(Spain) Álex Calatrava	6	6
(Algeria) Slimane Saoudi	0	3

=== Sixteenth qualifier ===
First round
16	(Spain) Fernando Verdasco	5	6	6
(France) Éric Prodon	7	2	8
(Spain) Francisco Clavet	1	6	6
(Italy) Potito Starace	6	4	0
WC	(France) Mathieu Montcourt	2	6	4
(Spain) Salvador Navarro	6	3	6
(United States) Paul Goldstein	6^{5}	7	5
30	(Argentina) Federico Browne	7^{7}	5	7

Second round
(France) Éric Prodon	0	4
(Spain) Francisco Clavet	6	6
(Spain) Salvador Navarro	3	4
30	(Argentina) Federico Browne	6	6

Qualifying competition
(Spain) Francisco Clavet	3	6	6
30	(Argentina) Federico Browne	6	1	8
