= 2003 French Open – Women's singles qualifying =

Women's singles qualifying
- 2003 French Open

Events
| Singles | men | women | | boys | girls |
| Doubles | men | women | mixed | boys | girls |
| WC Singles | men | women | quad |
| WC Doubles | men | women | quad |
| Legends | −45 | 45+ | women |

Qualification
| Singles | men | women |
- French Open

This article displays the qualifying draw for the Women's Singles at the 2003 French Open.

== Seeds ==
1. (Ukraine) Tatiana Perebiynis (qualified)
2. (Italy) Maria Elena Camerin (qualifying competition, lucky loser)
3. (United States) Samantha Reeves (qualifying competition, lucky loser)
4. (Russia) Anastasia Rodionova (first round)
5. (Slovakia) Martina Suchá (second round)
6. (Indonesia) Wynne Prakusya (qualified)
7. (Spain) Gala León García (qualified)
8. (Israel) Tzipora Obziler (qualifying competition)
9. (Hungary) Anikó Kapros (qualifying competition)
10. (Luxembourg) Claudine Schaul (second round)
11. (Canada) Maureen Drake (first round)
12. (Slovakia) Ľubomíra Kurhajcová (qualifying competition)
13. (Czech Republic) Sandra Kleinová (qualified)
14. (Venezuela) Milagros Sequera (second round)
15. (Italy) Mara Santangelo (first round)
16. (Spain) Arantxa Parra Santonja (first round)
17. (Serbia and Montenegro) Jelena Janković (second round)
18. (Czech Republic) Renata Voráčová (qualifying competition)
19. (Canada) Vanessa Webb (first round)
20. (Netherlands) Seda Noorlander (second round)
21. (Italy) Adriana Serra Zanetti (first round)
22. (Slovakia) Eva Fislová (first round)
23. (United States) Mashona Washington (first round)
24. (Ukraine) Julia Vakulenko (qualified)

== Qualifiers ==
1. (Ukraine) Tatiana Perebiynis
2. (Germany) Julia Schruff
3. (Argentina) Natalia Gussoni
4. (Russia) Maria Sharapova
5. (Czech Republic) Eva Birnerová
6. (Indonesia) Wynne Prakusya
7. (Spain) Gala León García
8. (Czech Republic) Sandra Kleinová
9. (Ukraine) Julia Vakulenko
10. (Argentina) Gisela Dulko
11. (Morocco) Bahia Mouhtassine
12. (Romania) Edina Gallovits

== Lucky losers ==
1. (Italy) Maria Elena Camerin
2. (United States) Samantha Reeves

== Qualifying draw ==
Key

- Q = Qualifier
- WC = Wild card
- LL = Lucky loser
- Alt = Alternate
- ITF = ITF entry
- PR = Protected ranking
- SR = Special ranking
- SE = Special exempt
- JE = Junior exempt
- JR = Junior Accelerator Programme entrant
- CO = College Accelerator Programme entrant
- NG = Next Gen Accelerator Program entrant
- w/o = Walkover
- r = Retired
- d = Defaulted

=== First qualifier ===
First round
1 | (Ukraine) Tatiana Perebiynis | 6 | 6
(United States) Bea Bielik | 1 | 2
(United States) Teryn Ashley | 6 | 6
WC | (France) Sylvia Montero | 2 | 4
(South Africa) Chanelle Scheepers | 3 | 2
(Slovakia) Zuzana Kucová | 6 | 6
WC | (France) Séverine Beltrame | 6 | 2 | 6
22 | (Slovakia) Eva Fislová | 3 | 6 | 3

Second round
1 | (Ukraine) Tatiana Perebiynis | 6 | 6
(United States) Teryn Ashley | 3 | 1
(Slovakia) Zuzana Kucová | 6 | 2 | 3
WC | (France) Séverine Beltrame | 3 | 6 | 6

Qualifying competition
1 | (Ukraine) Tatiana Perebiynis | 6 | 7
WC | (France) Séverine Beltrame | 1 | 5

=== Second qualifier ===
First round
2 | (Italy) Maria Elena Camerin | 6 | 6^{6} | 6
WC | (France) Anne-Laure Heitz | 3 | 7^{8} | 3
(Bulgaria) Maria Geznenge | 0 | 1
(Austria) Evelyn Fauth | 6 | 6
WC | (France) Emmanuelle Edon | 0 | 0
(Germany) Julia Schruff | 6 | 6
(Germany) Gréta Arn | 6 | 6
23 | (United States) Mashona Washington | 1 | 3

Second round
2 | (Italy) Maria Elena Camerin | 3 | 6 | 6
(Austria) Evelyn Fauth | 6 | 2 | 1
(Germany) Julia Schruff | 2 | 6 | 6
(Germany) Gréta Arn | 6 | 1 | 3

Qualifying competition
2 | (Italy) Maria Elena Camerin | 1 | 3
(Germany) Julia Schruff | 6 | 6

=== Third qualifier ===
First round
3 | (United States) Samantha Reeves | 6
(United States) Jennifer Hopkins | 3^{r}
(Czech Republic) Magdalena Zděnovcová | 6 | 1 | 6
WC | (France) Mathilde Johansson | 4 | 6 | 3
(Germany) Vanessa Henke | 3 | 1
(Argentina) Natalia Gussoni | 6 | 6
(Austria) Sybille Bammer | 6 | 5 | 4
14 | (Venezuela) Milagros Sequera | 1 | 7 | 6

Second round
3 | (United States) Samantha Reeves | 6 | 6
(Czech Republic) Magdalena Zděnovcová | 0 | 2
(Argentina) Natalia Gussoni | 6 | 6
14 | (Venezuela) Milagros Sequera | 1 | 0

Qualifying competition
3 | (United States) Samantha Reeves | 1 | 6 | 4
(Argentina) Natalia Gussoni | 6 | 4 | 6

=== Fourth qualifier ===
First round
4 | (Russia) Anastasia Rodionova | 3 | 3
(Russia) Maria Sharapova | 6 | 6
(Russia) Maria Goloviznina | 3 | 2
(Venezuela) María Vento-Kabchi | 6 | 6
(Netherlands) Anousjka van Exel | 2 | 1
(Ukraine) Yuliya Beygelzimer | 6 | 6
(Germany) Nina Dübbers | 2 | 6 | 6
15 | (Italy) Mara Santangelo | 6 | 3 | 1

Second round
(Russia) Maria Sharapova | 6 | 6
(Venezuela) María Vento-Kabchi | 3 | 1
(Ukraine) Yuliya Beygelzimer | 6 | 6
(Germany) Nina Dübbers | 3 | 1

Qualifying competition
(Russia) Maria Sharapova | 6^{6} | 7 | 8
(Ukraine) Yuliya Beygelzimer | 7^{8} | 5 | 6

=== Fifth qualifier ===
First round
5 | (Slovakia) Martina Suchá | 6^{0} | 6 | 7
(Spain) Anabel Medina Garrigues | 7^{7} | 2 | 5
(United Kingdom) Lucie Ahl | 0 | 1
(Hungary) Rita Kuti-Kis | 6 | 6
(Sweden) Sofia Arvidsson | 6 | 1 | 2
(Czech Republic) Eva Birnerová | 4 | 6 | 6
(Czech Republic) Michaela Paštiková | 2 | 6 | 2
20 | (Netherlands) Seda Noorlander | 6 | 2 | 6

Second round
5 | (Slovakia) Martina Suchá | 3 | 1
(Hungary) Rita Kuti-Kis | 6 | 6
(Czech Republic) Eva Birnerová | 4 | 6 | 6
20 | (Netherlands) Seda Noorlander | 6 | 4 | 4

Qualifying competition
(Hungary) Rita Kuti-Kis | 3 | 6 | 3
(Czech Republic) Eva Birnerová | 6 | 2 | 6

=== Sixth qualifier ===
First round
6 | (Indonesia) Wynne Prakusya | 6 | 6
(Australia) Samantha Stosur | 3 | 3
(United Kingdom) Anne Keothavong | 6 | 6
(Russia) Olga Kalyuzhnaya | 0 | 2
WC | (France) Olivia Sanchez | 4 | 7 | 6
(Japan) Yuka Yoshida | 6 | 5 | 3
(Canada) Jana Nejedly | 4 | 2
18 | (Czech Republic) Renata Voráčová | 6 | 6

Second round
6 | (Indonesia) Wynne Prakusya | 7 | 6
(United Kingdom) Anne Keothavong | 5 | 4
WC | (France) Olivia Sanchez | 6 | 0 | 3
18 | (Czech Republic) Renata Voráčová | 3 | 6 | 6

Qualifying competition
6 | (Indonesia) Wynne Prakusya | 6 | 4 | 6
18 | (Czech Republic) Renata Voráčová | 2 | 6 | 1

=== Seventh qualifier ===
First round
7 | (Spain) Gala León García | 6 | 7^{7}
(Estonia) Maret Ani | 1 | 6^{5}
(Croatia) Mirjana Lučić | 6 | 6
(United States) Tara Snyder | 4 | 4
(United Kingdom) Elena Baltacha | 3 | 7 | 4
(Hungary) Katalin Marosi | 6 | 5 | 6
(Hungary) Melinda Czink | 6 | 6
19 | (Canada) Vanessa Webb | 4 | 1

Second round
7 | (Spain) Gala León García | 7 | 6
(Croatia) Mirjana Lučić | 5 | 2
(Hungary) Katalin Marosi | 3 | 6 | 6
(Hungary) Melinda Czink | 6 | 4 | 3

Qualifying competition
7 | (Spain) Gala León García | 7 | 6
(Hungary) Katalin Marosi | 5 | 3

=== Eighth qualifier ===
First round
8 | (Israel) Tzipora Obziler | 6 | 6
(South Korea) Jeon Mi-ra | 3 | 3
(Tunisia) Selima Sfar | 5 | 7^{7} | 6
(United States) Sunitha Rao | 7 | 6^{3} | 2
(Argentina) María Emilia Salerni | 4 | 6 | 6
(Ukraine) Alona Bondarenko | 6 | 4 | 2
(Australia) Rachel McQuillan | 4 | 6^{5}
13 | (Czech Republic) Sandra Kleinová | 6 | 7^{7}

Second round
8 | (Israel) Tzipora Obziler | 4 | 6 | 6
(Tunisia) Selima Sfar | 6 | 2 | 4
(Argentina) María Emilia Salerni | 6 | 1 | 3
13 | (Czech Republic) Sandra Kleinová | 2 | 6 | 6

Qualifying competition
8 | (Israel) Tzipora Obziler | 6 | 4 | 13
13 | (Czech Republic) Sandra Kleinová | 4 | 6 | 15

=== Ninth qualifier ===
First round
9 | (Hungary) Anikó Kapros | 6 | 6
(Romania) Andreea Vanc | 4 | 2
(Russia) Galina Fokina | 4 | 3
(Bulgaria) Lubomira Bacheva | 6 | 6
(Italy) Nathalie Viérin | 3 | 7 | 6
(United States) Shenay Perry | 6 | 5 | 2
(Slovakia) Stanislava Hrozenská | 1 | 3
24 | (Ukraine) Julia Vakulenko | 6 | 6

Second round
9 | (Hungary) Anikó Kapros | 6 | 3 | 6
(Bulgaria) Lubomira Bacheva | 3 | 6 | 3
(Italy) Nathalie Viérin | 0 | 2
24 | (Ukraine) Julia Vakulenko | 6 | 6

Qualifying competition
9 | (Hungary) Anikó Kapros | 3 | 6 | 3
24 | (Ukraine) Julia Vakulenko | 6 | 3 | 6

=== Tenth qualifier ===
First round
10 | (Luxembourg) Claudine Schaul | 7^{7} | 6
(Germany) Bianka Lamade | 6^{5} | 1
(Czech Republic) Olga Blahotová | 3 | 4
(Argentina) Gisela Dulko | 6 | 6
WC | (France) Capucine Rousseau | 6 | 4 | 4
(South Africa) Natalie Grandin | 2 | 6 | 6
(Belarus) Nadejda Ostrovskaya | 7 | 1 | 6
16 | (Spain) Arantxa Parra Santonja | 5 | 6 | 1

Second round
10 | (Luxembourg) Claudine Schaul | 2 | 6^{9}
(Argentina) Gisela Dulko | 6 | 7^{11}
(South Africa) Natalie Grandin | 3 | 2
(Belarus) Nadejda Ostrovskaya | 6 | 6

Qualifying competition
(Argentina) Gisela Dulko | 6 | 6
(Belarus) Nadejda Ostrovskaya | 3 | 0

=== Eleventh qualifier ===
First round
11 | (Canada) Maureen Drake | 3 | 4
(China) Zheng Jie | 6 | 6
(Ukraine) Yuliana Fedak | 7^{8} | 6
(Czech Republic) Alena Vašková | 6^{6} | 4
(Netherlands) Kristie Boogert | 4 | 3
(Italy) Roberta Vinci | 6 | 6
(Morocco) Bahia Mouhtassine | 6 | 6
21 | (Italy) Adriana Serra Zanetti | 4 | 1

Second round
(China) Zheng Jie | 7 | 6
(Ukraine) Yuliana Fedak | 5 | 3
(Italy) Roberta Vinci | 4 | 1
(Morocco) Bahia Mouhtassine | 6 | 6

Qualifying competition
(China) Zheng Jie | 6^{8} | 2
(Morocco) Bahia Mouhtassine | 7^{10} | 6

=== Twelfth qualifier ===
First round
12 | (Slovakia) Ľubomíra Kurhajcová | 6 | 6
(Germany) Jana Kandarr | 1 | 3
(United Kingdom) Julie Pullin | 6 | 6
WC | (France) Stéphanie Rizzi | 4 | 4
(Romania) Edina Gallovits | 6 | 6
(Canada) Marie-Ève Pelletier | 1 | 2
(Ukraine) Elena Tatarkova | 5 | 2
17 | (Serbia and Montenegro) Jelena Janković | 7 | 6

Second round
12 | (Slovakia) Ľubomíra Kurhajcová | 7 | 6
(United Kingdom) Julie Pullin | 5 | 2
(Romania) Edina Gallovits | 6 | 0 | 6
17 | (Serbia and Montenegro) Jelena Janković | 4 | 6 | 4

Qualifying competition
12 | (Slovakia) Ľubomíra Kurhajcová | 4 | 3
(Romania) Edina Gallovits | 6 | 6
