= 2003 Australian Open – Girls' singles =

Girls' singles
- 2003 Australian Open

Final
- Champion: (Czech Republic) Barbora Strýcová
- Runner-up: (Ukraine) Viktoriya Kutuzova
- Score: 0–6, 6–2, 6–2

Events
Singles	men	women		boys	girls
Doubles	men	women	mixed	boys	girls
WC Singles	men	women	quad
WC Doubles	men	women	quad
Legends	men	women	mixed
- Australian Open

Defending champion Barbora Strýcová successfully defended her title, defeating Viktoriya Kutuzova in the final, 0–6, 6–2, 6–2.

== Seeds ==
1. (Czech Republic) Barbora Strýcová (champion)
2. (Slovakia) Jarmila Gajdošová (first round)
3. (Czech Republic) Petra Cetkovská (first round)
4. (Japan) Ryōko Fuda (first round)
5. (Canada) Beier Ko (quarterfinals)
6. (Serbia and Montenegro) Ana Ivanovic (first round)
7. (Czech Republic) Kateřina Böhmová (second round)
8. (Czech Republic) Andrea Hlaváčková (third round)
9. (Ukraine) Viktoria Kutuzova (final)
10. (Ukraine) Kateryna Bondarenko (first round)
11. (Netherlands) Silvana Bauer (third round)
12. (Slovakia) Kristína Czafiková (second round)
13. (Slovenia) Andreja Klepač (first round)
14. (New Zealand) Eden Marama (quarterfinals)
15. (Croatia) Nadja Pavić (second round)
16. (Poland) Marta Domachowska (semifinals)

== Draw ==
Key

- Q = Qualifier
- WC = Wild card
- LL = Lucky loser
- Alt = Alternate
- ITF = ITF entry
- PR = Protected ranking
- SR = Special ranking
- SE = Special exempt
- JE = Junior exempt
- JR = Junior Accelerator Programme entrant
- CO = College Accelerator Programme entrant
- NG = Next Gen Accelerator Program entrant
- w/o = Walkover
- r = Retired
- d = Defaulted

=== Finals ===
Quarterfinals
1	(Czech Republic) Barbora Strýcová	6	6^{4}	6
5	(Canada) Beier Ko	4	7^{7}	2
16	(Poland) Marta Domachowska	6	6
WC	(Australia) Adriana Szili	2	3
9	(Ukraine) Viktoria Kutuzova	7	6
14	(New Zealand) Eden Marama	5	3
(Finland) Emma Laine	6	6
(Canada) Aleksandra Wozniak	2	4

Semifinals
1	(Czech Republic) Barbora Strýcová	6	6
16	(Poland) Marta Domachowska	1	4
9	(Ukraine) Viktoria Kutuzova	4	6	8
(Finland) Emma Laine	6	1	6

Final
1	(Czech Republic) Barbora Strýcová	0	6	6
9	(Ukraine) Viktoria Kutuzova	6	2	2

=== Top half ===
==== Section 1 ====
First round
1	(Czech Republic) Barbora Strýcová	7	6
(Japan) Moe Kawatoko	5	3
(Germany) Sarah Raab	6	2	2
(Indonesia) Sandy Gumulya	2	6	6
(Australia) Tiffany Welford	1	0
(Hungary) Virág Németh	6	6
Q	(Belgium) Stephanie de Laet	3	3
15/Q	(Croatia) Nadja Pavić	6	6
10	(Ukraine) Kateryna Bondarenko	7	1	1
(China) Rui Du	5	6	6
WC	(Australia) Natalie Tanevska	6^{4}	6	0
(Israel) Shahar Pe'er	7^{7}	2	6
(United States) Jennifer-Lee Heinser	6	6
(Australia) Lara Giltinan	3	4
Q	(Netherlands) Kelly de Beer	6	3	2
5	(Canada) Beier Ko	1	6	6

Second round
1	(Czech Republic) B Strýcová	6	6
(Indonesia) S Gumulya	2	1
(Hungary) V Németh	6	6
15/Q	(Croatia) N Pavic	1	2
(China) R Du	6	3	6
(Israel) S Pe'er	1	6	3
(United States) J-L Heinser	2	0
5	(Canada) B Ko	6	6

Third round
1	(Czech Republic) B Strýcová	6	6
(Hungary) V Németh	2	1
(China) R Du	2	4
5	(Canada) B Ko	6	6

Quarterfinals
1	(Czech Republic) B Strýcová	6	6^{4}	6
5	(Canada) B Ko	4	7^{7}	2

==== Section 2 ====
First round
3	(Czech Republic) Petra Cetkovská	2	5
(Australia) Casey Dellacqua	6	7
Q	(France) Pauline Parmentier	2	3
(South Korea) So-Jung Kim	6	6
(China) Yan-Chong Chen	6	7
WC	(Australia) Jessica Engels	3	5
WC	(Australia) Dubravka Cupac	6	3	3
16	(Poland) Marta Domachowska	4	6	6
12	(Slovakia) Kristína Czafiková	6	4	6
Q	(Italy) Sara Errani	4	6	2
(Luxembourg) Mandy Minella	6	3	5
WC	(Australia) Adriana Szili	4	6	7
Q	(Ukraine) Ganna Butkevych	2	2
(United States) Mary Gambale	6	6
(Germany) Andrea Petkovic	1	6	9
6	(Serbia and Montenegro) Ana Ivanovic	6	2	7

Second round
(Australia) C Dellacqua	6	6
(South Korea) S-J Kim	3	4
(China) Y-C Chen	2	1
16	(Poland) M Domachowska	6	6
12	(Slovakia) K Czafiková	6	6^{1}	5
WC	(Australia) A Szili	2	7^{7}	7
(United States) M Gambale	6	4	4
(Germany) A Petkovic	4	6	6

Third round
(Australia) C Dellacqua	6^{6}	5
16	(Poland) M Domachowska	7^{8}	7
WC	(Australia) A Szili	6	4	6
(Germany) A Petkovic	0	6	3

Quarterfinals
16	(Poland) M Domachowska	6	6
WC	(Australia) A Szili	2	3

=== Bottom half ===
==== Section 3 ====
First round
8	(Czech Republic) Andrea Hlaváčková	6	6
(Germany) Tatjana Malek	1	0
(China) Sheng-Nan Sun	1	4
(Belgium) Kirsten Flipkens	6	6
(Australia) Darya Ivanov	3	6	6
WC	(Australia) Lara Picone	6	3	3
(Chinese Taipei) Yung-Jan Chan	1	3
9	(Ukraine) Viktoria Kutuzova	6	6
14	(New Zealand) Eden Marama	7^{7}	3	6
(Sweden) Mari Andersson	6^{5}	6	2
(Australia) Sophie Ferguson	6	6
(France) Charlene Vanneste	3	3
WC	(Australia) Bojana Bobusic	6	0	3
(United States) Nicole Pitts	3	6	6
(Romania) Mădălina Gojnea	6	6
4	(Japan) Ryōko Fuda	3	1

Second round
8	(Czech Republic) A Hlaváčková	7	6
(Belgium) K Flipkens	5	2
(Australia) D Ivanov	2	0
9	(Ukraine) V Kutuzova	6	6
14	(New Zealand) E Marama	6	6
(Australia) S Ferguson	3	4
(United States) N Pitts	1	6	3
(Romania) M Gojnea	6	3	6

Third round
8	(Czech Republic) A Hlaváčková	2	2
9	(Ukraine) V Kutuzova	6	6
14	(New Zealand) E Marama	6	6
(Romania) M Gojnea	4	4

Quarterfinals
9	(Ukraine) V Kutuzova	7	6
14	(New Zealand) E Marama	5	3

==== Section 4 ====
First round
7	(Czech Republic) Kateřina Böhmová	6	2	6
WC	(Australia) Daniella Dominikovic	3	6	4
(Finland) Emma Laine	2
(Hungary) Petra Teller	1^{r}
(Germany) Angelique Kerber	6	6
Q	(Indonesia) Septi Mende	3	4
WC	(Australia) Natasha Kersten	3	4
11	(Netherlands) Silvana Bauer	6	6
13	(Slovenia) Andreja Klepač	6^{5}	2
(Canada) Aleksandra Wozniak	7^{7}	6
(France) Sylvia Montero	6	6
(Australia) Olivia Lukaszewicz	4	2
(South Korea) Ji-Young Kim	6	6^{3}	0^{r}
Q	(Croatia) Timna Ticic	3	7^{7}	4
(Czech Republic) Nicole Vaidišová	6	2	6
2	(Slovakia) Jarmila Gajdošová	1	6	4

Second round
7	(Czech Republic) K Böhmová	2	6	3
(Finland) E Laine	6	4	6
(Germany) A Kerber	6	1	3
11	(Netherlands) S Bauer	3	6	6
(Canada) A Wozniak	4	7	6
(France) S Montero	6	6	3
Q	(Croatia) T Ticic	1	1
(Czech Republic) N Vaidišová	6	6

Third round
(Finland) E Laine	6	3	6
11	(Netherlands) S Bauer	3	6	3
(Canada) A Wozniak	6	6
(Czech Republic) N Vaidišová	4	3

Quarterfinals
(Finland) E Laine	6	6
(Canada) A Wozniak	2	4

== Sources ==
- Draw
