= Kučová =

Kučová is Slovak surname. Notable people with the surname include:

- Zuzana Kučová (born 1982), Slovak tennis player
- Kristína Kučová (born 1990), Slovak tennis player
