= Sylvia Montero =

French tennis player

- Country (sports): France
- Born: 30 June 1985 (age 41)
- Plays: Right-handed
- Prize money: $17,171

Singles
- Career record: 51–66
- Highest ranking: No. 479 (10 November 2003)

Grand Slam singles results
- French Open: Q1 (2003)

Doubles
- Career record: 13–16
- Career titles: 1 ITF
- Highest ranking: No. 701 (1 November 2004)

Grand Slam doubles results
- French Open: 1R (2003)

Sylvia Montero (born 30 June 1985) is a French former professional tennis player.

A right-handed player from Yvelines, Montero won French national titles in junior tennis and was ranked as high as 38 in the world while competing on the ITF Junior Circuit.

On the professional tour she peaked at 479 in the world, finishing runner-up in two ITF finals. She made a French Open main draw appearance in women's doubles in 2003, as a wildcard pairing with Mathilde Johansson.

== ITF finals ==
=== Singles: 2 (0–2) ===
Outcome	No.	Date	Tournament	Surface	Opponent	Score
Runner-up	1.	16 February 2003	Albufeira, Portugal	Hard	(Italy) Silvia Disderi	1–6, 1–6
Runner-up	2.	13 August 2006	Rebecq, Belgium	Clay	(Belgium) Caroline Maes	1–6, 2–6

=== Doubles: 1 (1–0) ===
Outcome	Date	Tournament	Surface	Partner	Opponents	Score
Winner	24 October 2004	Settimo San Pietro, Italy	Clay	(Italy) Stefania Chieppa	(Italy) Raffaella Bindi (Czech Republic) Sandra Záhlavová	7–6^{(7–5)}, 3–6, 6–2
