= Jack Brasington =

American tennis player

- Country (sports): United States
- Residence: Houston, Texas
- Born: September 9, 1976 (age 48); Miami, Florida
- Height: 6 ft 2 in (188 cm)
- Turned pro: 2000
- Plays: Right-handed
- Prize money: $173,770

Singles
- Career record: 2–8
- Career titles: 0
- Highest ranking: No. 125 (July 29, 2002)

Grand Slam singles results
- Australian Open: 1R (2002, 2003)
- French Open: 2R (2002)
- Wimbledon: 1R (2002)
- US Open: 2R (2001)

Doubles
- Career record: 0–1
- Career titles: 0
- Highest ranking: No. 315 (June 16, 2003)

Grand Slam doubles results
- US Open: 1R (2002)

Jack Brasington (born September 9, 1976) is a former professional tennis player from the United States.

== Career ==
Before he turned professional, Brasington played collegiate tennis for the University of Texas at Austin. He attained a best ranking of seventh in the nation and holds the university record for most wins, 121.

Brasington made the second round of the 2001 US Open, in what was his maiden Grand Slam appearance. His opening round win, over Gianluca Pozzi, was decided in a fifth set tiebreak, during which the American saved a match point. He won the tiebreak 8–6, to set up a second round meeting with Andy Roddick, who would beat Brasington in four sets.

In 2002 he managed to get past qualifying and play in the main draw of all four Grand Slam tournaments. He reached the second round of the French Open that year, with a win over Federico Luzzi. At the 2002 US Open, in addition to the singles, he played in the doubles for the only time, with Vince Spadea. His only other Grand Slam appearance was in the 2003 Australian Open, where he lost his first round match to Sjeng Schalken.

== Challenger Titles ==
=== Singles: (1) ===
No.	Year	Tournament	Surface	Opponent in the final	Score in the final
1.	2002	Joplin, United States	Hard	(United States) Kevin Kim	6–3, 1–6, 6–3

=== Doubles: (1) ===
No.	Year	Tournament	Surface	Partner	Opponents in the final	Score in the final
1.	2002	Lexington, United States	Hard	(United States) Glenn Weiner	(United States) Brandon Coupe (Philippines) Eric Taino	6–2, 4–6, 7–5
