= Adriana Szili =

Australian tennis player

- Country (sports): Australia
- Born: 6 January 1985 (age 41) Adelaide, South Australia
- Plays: Right-handed
- Prize money: $39,195

Singles
- Career record: 60–72
- Highest ranking: No. 409 (21 October 2002)

Grand Slam singles results
- Australian Open: 1R (2003)

Doubles
- Career record: 19–45
- Highest ranking: No. 468 (28 February 2005)

Grand Slam doubles results
- Australian Open: 1R (2002, 2003)

Adriana Szili (born 6 January 1985) is a former professional tennis player from Australia.

== Biography ==
Szili, who comes from Adelaide, started playing tennis aged five and was coached by Graeme Neville. As a junior her most noted performance came at the 2002 Australian Open where she and Casey Dellacqua won the girls' doubles title. She also was a quarter-finalist in the girls' singles draw and received a wildcard into the women's doubles draw with Jaslyn Hewitt. Szili and Hewitt were beaten in the opening round by eventual quarter-finalists Amanda Coetzer and Lori McNeil. A week later she won a $10,000 ITF circuit tournament in Wellington, with a win over local player Ilke Gers in the final. At the 2003 Australian Open she played in the women's singles event for the only time and was beaten by 28th seed Clarisa Fernández in the first round. In the doubles event she and partner Hewitt were again eliminated by Coetzer, who on this occasion was partnering Jessica Steck.

== ITF finals ==
=== Singles (1-3) ===
Outcome	No.	Date	Tournament	Surface	Opponent	Score
Winner	1.	29 January 2002	Wellington, New Zealand	Hard	(New Zealand) Ilke Gers	6–2, 6–2
Runner-up	1.	15 September 2002	Kyoto, Japan	Hard (i)	(Japan) Shiho Hisamatsu	6–2, 3–6, 3–6
Runner-up	2.	22 September 2002	Kyoto, Japan	Hard (i)	(Japan) Shiho Hisamatsu	5–7, 5–7
Runner-up	3.	10 September 2006	Hope Island, Australia	Hard	(Australia) Shannon Golds	2–6, 2–6
