= 2003 Australian Open – Men's doubles =

Men's doubles
- 2003 Australian Open

Final
- Champion: (France) Michaël Llodra (France) Fabrice Santoro
- Runner-up: (The Bahamas) Mark Knowles (Canada) Daniel Nestor
- Score: 6–4, 3–6, 6–3

Details
- Draw: 64
- Seeds: 16

Events
Singles	men	women		boys	girls
Doubles	men	women	mixed	boys	girls
WC Singles	men	women	quad
WC Doubles	men	women	quad
Legends	men	women	mixed
- Australian Open

Mark Knowles and Daniel Nestor were the defending champions, but lost in the final to Michaël Llodra and Fabrice Santoro.

This was the first Australian Open to include a final set tie-break in doubles.

== Seeds ==
1. (The Bahamas) Mark Knowles / (Canada) Daniel Nestor (final)
2. (United States) Bob Bryan / (United States) Mike Bryan (third round)
3. (United States) Donald Johnson / (United States) Jared Palmer (quarterfinals)
4. (India) Mahesh Bhupathi / (Australia) Joshua Eagle (first round)
5. (Czech Republic) Martin Damm / (Czech Republic) Cyril Suk (third round)
6. (Zimbabwe) Wayne Black / (Zimbabwe) Kevin Ullyett (third round)
7. (Russia) Yevgeny Kafelnikov / (Czech Republic) Radek Štěpánek (second round)
8. (France) Michaël Llodra / (France) Fabrice Santoro (champions)
9. (India) Leander Paes / (Czech Republic) David Rikl (quarterfinals)
10. (South Africa) David Adams / (South Africa) Robbie Koenig (second round)
11. (Germany) David Prinosil / (Federal Republic of Yugoslavia) Nenad Zimonjić (first round)
12. (South Africa) Jeff Coetzee / (South Africa) Chris Haggard (semifinals)
13. (Czech Republic) Petr Pála / (Czech Republic) Pavel Vízner (first round)
14. (United States) Jan-Michael Gambill / (United States) Graydon Oliver (first round)
15. (South Africa) Ellis Ferreira / (United States) Brian MacPhie (second round)
16. (Argentina) Gastón Etlis / (Argentina) Martín Rodríguez (semifinals)

== Draw ==
Key

- Q = Qualifier
- WC = Wild card
- LL = Lucky loser
- Alt = Alternate
- ITF = ITF entry
- PR = Protected ranking
- SR = Special ranking
- SE = Special exempt
- JE = Junior exempt
- JR = Junior Accelerator Programme entrant
- CO = College Accelerator Programme entrant
- NG = Next Gen Accelerator Program entrant
- w/o = Walkover
- r = Retired
- d = Defaulted

=== Finals ===
Quarterfinals
1	(The Bahamas) Mark Knowles (Canada) Daniel Nestor	6	6
(Spain) Albert Portas (Spain) Tommy Robredo	1	3
16	(Argentina) Gastón Etlis (Argentina) Martín Rodríguez	6	6
9	(India) Leander Paes (Czech Republic) David Rikl	3	3
12	(South Africa) Jeff Coetzee (South Africa) Chris Haggard	6^{3}	6	7
3	(United States) Donald Johnson (United States) Jared Palmer	7	2	6^{2}
8	(France) Michaël Llodra (France) Fabrice Santoro	6	6
(Ecuador) Nicolás Lapentti (Australia) Todd Woodbridge	4	4

Semifinals
1	(The Bahamas) Mark Knowles (Canada) Daniel Nestor	6	6
16	(Argentina) Gastón Etlis (Argentina) Martín Rodríguez	3	4
12	(South Africa) Jeff Coetzee (South Africa) Chris Haggard	2	6	5
8	(France) Michaël Llodra (France) Fabrice Santoro	6	4	7

Final
1	(The Bahamas) Mark Knowles (Canada) Daniel Nestor	4	6	3
8	(France) Michaël Llodra (France) Fabrice Santoro	6	3	6

=== Top half ===
==== Section 1 ====
First round
1	(The Bahamas) M Knowles (Canada) D Nestor	6	6
(Argentina) M Hood (Brazil) A Sá	3	3
WC	(Australia) R Henry (Australia) T Reid	2	7	6
(Germany) K Braasch (Germany) R Schüttler	6	5	4
(Argentina) J Acasuso (Argentina) A Schneiter	5	3
(Spain) À Corretja (Spain) A Costa	7	6
WC	(Australia) R Durek (Australia) A Jones	7	4	6
13	(Czech Republic) P Pála (Czech Republic) P Vízner	5	6	2
10	(South Africa) D Adams (Australia) R Koenig	7	3	7
(United States) J Thomas (Belgium) T Vanhoudt	5	6	6^{5}
(Austria) J Knowle (Germany) M Kohlmann	4	2
(Spain) A Portas (Spain) T Robredo	6	6
(Argentina) L Arnold Ker (Argentina) D Nalbandian	6	4	2
(Netherlands) S Schalken (Netherlands) J van Lottum	3	6	6
WC	(Germany) L Burgsmüller (South Korea) H-T Lee	0	6^{2}
5	(Czech Republic) M Damm (Czech Republic) C Suk	6	7

Second round
1	(The Bahamas) M Knowles (Canada) D Nestor	6	6
WC	(Australia) R Henry (Australia) T Reid	3	3
(Spain) À Corretja (Spain) A Costa	4	7	4
WC	(Australia) R Durek (Australia) A Jones	6	5	6
10	(South Africa) D Adams (Australia) R Koenig	5	7	2
(Spain) A Portas (Spain) T Robredo	7	6^{5}	6
(Netherlands) S Schalken (Netherlands) J van Lottum	6	4	2
5	(Czech Republic) M Damm (Czech Republic) C Suk	3	6	6

Third round
1	(The Bahamas) M Knowles (Canada) D Nestor	6	6
WC	(Australia) R Durek (Australia) A Jones	3	3
(Spain) A Portas (Spain) T Robredo	7	6
5	(Czech Republic) M Damm (Czech Republic) C Suk	6^{4}	3

Quarterfinals
1	(The Bahamas) M Knowles (Canada) D Nestor	6	6
(Spain) A Portas (Spain) T Robredo	1	3

==== Section 2 ====
First round
4	(India) M Bhupathi (Australia) J Eagle	4	6	4
(Czech Republic) T Cibulec (Czech Republic) D Škoch	6	4	6
(Czech Republic) O Fukárek (Czech Republic) P Luxa	6	6
(Spain) A Martín (Spain) D Sánchez	3	4
(Belarus) M Mirnyi (Belarus) V Voltchkov	6	6
(Argentina) G Gaudio (Argentina) M Puerta	2	3
(Sweden) J Landsberg (Finland) J Nieminen	4	4
16	(Argentina) G Etlis (Argentina) M Rodríguez	6	6
9	(India) L Paes (Czech Republic) D Rikl	6	6
(Australia) P Hanley (Australia) A Kratzmann	4	3
(Morocco) H Arazi (Morocco) Y El Aynaoui	6	6
WC	(Spain) F López (Japan) T Shimada	4	4
(United States) J Blake (The Bahamas) M Merklein	6	6
(Argentina) G Cañas (Spain) F Clavet	3	4
(Italy) C Brandi (Croatia) I Ljubičić	1	6^{1}
7	(Russia) Y Kafelnikov (Czech Republic) R Štěpánek	6	7

Second round
(Czech Republic) T Cibulec (Czech Republic) D Škoch	2	3
(Czech Republic) O Fukárek (Czech Republic) P Luxa	6	6
(Belarus) M Mirnyi (Belarus) V Voltchkov	4	3
16	(Argentina) G Etlis (Argentina) M Rodríguez	6	6
9	(India) L Paes (Czech Republic) D Rikl	7	6
(Morocco) H Arazi (Morocco) Y El Aynaoui	6^{4}	1
(United States) J Blake (The Bahamas) M Merklein	6^{2}	6	6
7	(Russia) Y Kafelnikov (Czech Republic) R Štěpánek	7	4	3

Third round
(Czech Republic) O Fukárek (Czech Republic) P Luxa	6	5	3
16	(Argentina) G Etlis (Argentina) M Rodríguez	1	7	6
9	(India) L Paes (Czech Republic) D Rikl	6	4	6
(United States) J Blake (The Bahamas) M Merklein	4	6	2

Quarterfinals
16	(Argentina) G Etlis (Argentina) M Rodríguez	6	6
9	(India) L Paes (Czech Republic) D Rikl	3	3

=== Bottom half ===
==== Section 3 ====
First round
6	(Zimbabwe) W Black (Zimbabwe) K Ullyett	6	6
(Italy) M Bertolini (Italy) D Sanguinetti	1	2
(Argentina) JI Chela (Argentina) L Lobo	7	7
WC	(Australia) W Arthurs (Australia) T Larkham	6^{6}	6^{5}
(Spain) A Montañés (Spain) F Vicente	2	3
WC	(Australia) N Healey (Australia) J Kerr	6	6
(Argentina) M García (Chile) F González	4	6^{4}
12	(South Africa) J Coetzee (South Africa) C Haggard	6	7
15	(South Africa) E Ferreira (United States) B MacPhie	6	7
(Spain) Á López Morón (Spain) C Moyà	2	5
(Belgium) O Rochus (Brazil) F Saretta	6	3	2
(United States) D Bowen (Australia) A Fisher	3	6	6
WC	(Australia) J Crabb (Australia) P Luczak	2	4
(Sweden) S Aspelin (South Africa) J-L de Jager	6	6
(United States) M Fish (United States) M Hill	2	4
3	(United States) D Johnson (United States) J Palmer	6	6

Second round
6	(Zimbabwe) W Black (Zimbabwe) K Ullyett	4	6	6
(Argentina) JI Chela (Argentina) L Lobo	6	3	2
WC	(Australia) N Healey (Australia) J Kerr	7	3	6^{3}
12	(South Africa) J Coetzee (South Africa) C Haggard	5	6	7
15	(South Africa) E Ferreira (United States) B MacPhie	2	6	6^{2}
(United States) D Bowen (Australia) A Fisher	6	4	7
(Sweden) S Aspelin (South Africa) J-L de Jager	3	0
3	(United States) D Johnson (United States) J Palmer	6	6

Third round
6	(Zimbabwe) W Black (Zimbabwe) K Ullyett	4	5
12	(South Africa) J Coetzee (South Africa) C Haggard	6	7
(United States) D Bowen (Australia) A Fisher	3	4
3	(United States) D Johnson (United States) J Palmer	6	6

Quarterfinals
12	(South Africa) J Coetzee (South Africa) C Haggard	6^{3}	6	7
3	(United States) D Johnson (United States) J Palmer	7	2	6^{2}

==== Section 4 ====
First round
8	(France) M Llodra (France) F Santoro	6	6
(United States) S Humphries (Australia) S Huss	3	4
WC	(Australia) L Bourgeois (Australia) S Draper	4	7	7
(Spain) D Ferrer (Argentina) F Squillari	6	5	6^{2}
(United States) J Tarango (South Africa) M Wakefield	2	5
(France) A Dupuis (Brazil) F Meligeni	6	7
(Switzerland) Y Allegro (Switzerland) R Federer	3	6	7
11	(Germany) D Prinosil (Federal Republic of Yugoslavia) N Zimonjić	6	3	6^{7}
14	(United States) J-M Gambill (United States) G Oliver	6	4	4
(Ecuador) N Lapentti (Australia) T Woodbridge	4	6	6
(Czech Republic) F Čermák (Czech Republic) L Friedl	6	6
(Australia) A Florent (Australia) S Stolle	2	2
(Belgium) X Malisse (Armenia) S Sargsian	6	6
(Argentina) G Coria (Argentina) M Zabaleta	2	3
(Argentina) S Prieto (Russia) M Youzhny	3	5
2	(United States) B Bryan (United States) M Bryan	6	7

Second round
8	(France) M Llodra (France) F Santoro	6	6^{4}	6
WC	(Australia) L Bourgeois (Australia) S Draper	4	7	3
(France) A Dupuis (Brazil) F Meligeni	3	4
(Switzerland) Y Allegro (Switzerland) R Federer	6	6
(Ecuador) N Lapentti (Australia) T Woodbridge	6	6
(Czech Republic) F Čermák (Czech Republic) L Friedl	3	4
(Belgium) X Malisse (Armenia) S Sargsian
2	(United States) B Bryan (United States) M Bryan	w/o

Third round
8	(France) M Llodra (France) F Santoro	6	6
(Switzerland) Y Allegro (Switzerland) R Federer	2	4
(Ecuador) N Lapentti (Australia) T Woodbridge	3	7	7
2	(United States) B Bryan (United States) M Bryan	6	6^{2}	5

Quarterfinals
8	(France) M Llodra (France) F Santoro	6	6
(Ecuador) N Lapentti (Australia) T Woodbridge	4	4
