= 2003 Australian Open – Women's doubles =

Women's doubles
- 2003 Australian Open

Final
- Champions: (United States) Serena Williams (United States) Venus Williams
- Runners-up: (Spain) Virginia Ruano Pascual (Argentina) Paola Suárez
- Score: 4–6, 6–4, 6–3

Details
- Draw: 64
- Seeds: 16

Events
Singles	men	women		boys	girls
Doubles	men	women	mixed	boys	girls
WC Singles	men	women	quad
WC Doubles	men	women	quad
Legends	men	women	mixed
- Australian Open

Serena and Venus Williams defeated Virginia Ruano Pascual and Paola Suárez in the final, 4–6, 6–4, 6–3 to win the women's doubles tennis title at the 2003 Australian Open. It was their second Australian Open title together and sixth major title together overall.

Martina Hingis and Anna Kournikova were the reigning champions, but Hingis did not participate. Kournikova partnered with Chanda Rubin, but lost in the third round to Conchita Martínez and Nadia Petrova.

This was the first edition to feature a final set tie-break.

== Seeds ==
1. (United States) Serena Williams / (United States) Venus Williams (champions)
2. (Spain) Virginia Ruano Pascual / (Argentina) Paola Suárez (final)
3. (Russia) Elena Dementieva / (Slovakia) Janette Husárová (second round)
4. (Zimbabwe) Cara Black / (Russia) Elena Likhovtseva (third round)
5. (Slovakia) Daniela Hantuchová / (United States) Meghann Shaughnessy (quarterfinals)
6. (United States) Lindsay Davenport / (United States) Lisa Raymond (semifinals)
7. (Belgium) Kim Clijsters / (Japan) Ai Sugiyama (quarterfinals)
8. (Spain) Conchita Martínez / (Russia) Nadia Petrova (quarterfinals)
9. (Russia) Anna Kournikova / (United States) Chanda Rubin (third round)
10. (Belgium) Els Callens / (Japan) Rika Fujiwara (first round)
11. (Chinese Taipei) Janet Lee / (Indonesia) Wynne Prakusya (second round)
12. (Slovenia) Tina Križan / (Slovenia) Katarina Srebotnik (first round)
13. (Austria) Barbara Schett / (Austria) Patricia Wartusch (first round)
14. (Russia) Elena Bovina / (Belgium) Justine Henin (third round)
15. (Italy) Silvia Farina Elia / (Italy) Tathiana Garbin (second round)
16. (Russia) Svetlana Kuznetsova / (United States) Martina Navratilova (third round)

== Draw ==
Key

- Q = Qualifier
- WC = Wild card
- LL = Lucky loser
- Alt = Alternate
- ITF = ITF entry
- PR = Protected ranking
- SR = Special ranking
- SE = Special exempt
- JE = Junior exempt
- JR = Junior Accelerator Programme entrant
- CO = College Accelerator Programme entrant
- NG = Next Gen Accelerator Program entrant
- w/o = Walkover
- r = Retired
- d = Defaulted

=== Finals ===
Quarterfinals
1	(United States) Serena Williams (United States) Venus Williams	6	7
7	(Belgium) Kim Clijsters (Japan) Ai Sugiyama	4	5
(France) Mary Pierce (Australia) Rennae Stubbs	1	5
6	(United States) Lindsay Davenport (United States) Lisa Raymond	6	7
5	(Slovakia) Daniela Hantuchová (United States) Meghann Shaughnessy	4	2
(Switzerland) Emmanuelle Gagliardi (Hungary) Petra Mandula	6	6
8	(Spain) Conchita Martínez (Russia) Nadia Petrova	6	5	6^{3}
2	(Spain) Virginia Ruano Pascual (Argentina) Paola Suárez	2	7	7^{7}

Semifinals
1	(United States) Serena Williams (United States) Venus Williams	6	6
6	(United States) Lindsay Davenport (United States) Lisa Raymond	2	2
(Switzerland) Emmanuelle Gagliardi (Hungary) Petra Mandula	0	2
2	(Spain) Virginia Ruano Pascual (Argentina) Paola Suárez	6	6

Final
1	(United States) Serena Williams (United States) Venus Williams	4	6	6
2	(Spain) Virginia Ruano Pascual (Argentina) Paola Suárez	6	4	3

=== Top half ===
==== Section 1 ====
First round
1/WC	(United States) S Williams (United States) V Williams	6	6
(Italy) R Grande (Switzerland) P Schnyder	3	1
WC	(Australia) C Dellacqua (Australia) N Sewell	4	6	6
(Russia) G Fokina (Russia) A Rodionova	6	2	2
(Italy) A Canepa (Venezuela) M Sequera	6	1	6
(Italy) F Pennetta (Italy) A Serra Zanetti	3	6	3
(Switzerland) M Casanova (Australia) N Pratt	7	1	3
16	(Russia) S Kuznetsova (United States) M Navratilova	5	6	6
12	(Slovenia) T Križan (Slovenia) K Srebotnik	2	3
(Australia) R McQuillan (United States) M Tu	6	6
(Australia) C Barclay (Germany) M Müller	6	6^{3}	6^{4}
(Germany) K Freye (Federal Republic of Yugoslavia) D Zarić	4	7^{7}	7^{7}
WC	(Australia) J Hewitt (Australia) A Szili	1	4
(South Africa) A Coetzer (South Africa) J Steck	6	6
(Australia) T Musgrave (Thailand) T Tanasugarn	3	5
7	(Belgium) K Clijsters (Japan) A Sugiyama	6	7

Second round
1/WC	(United States) S Williams (United States) V Williams	6	6
WC	(Australia) C Dellacqua (Australia) N Sewell	3	2
(Italy) A Canepa (Venezuela) M Sequera	2	1
16	(Russia) S Kuznetsova (United States) M Navratilova	6	6
(Australia) R McQuillan (United States) M Tu	4	6	4
(Germany) K Freye (Federal Republic of Yugoslavia) D Zarić	6	4	6
(South Africa) A Coetzer (South Africa) J Steck	2	4
7	(Belgium) K Clijsters (Japan) A Sugiyama	6	6

Third round
1/WC	(United States) S Williams (United States) V Williams	6	6
16	(Russia) S Kuznetsova (United States) M Navratilova	2	3
(Germany) K Freye (Federal Republic of Yugoslavia) D Zarić	1	1
7	(Belgium) K Clijsters (Japan) A Sugiyama	6	6

Quarterfinals
1/WC	(United States) S Williams (United States) V Williams	6	7
7	(Belgium) K Clijsters (Japan) A Sugiyama	4	5

==== Section 2 ====
First round
4	(Zimbabwe) C Black (Russia) E Likhovtseva	6	7^{7}
(Russia) E Kulikovskaya (Belarus) T Poutchek	3	6^{4}
(United States) B Rippner (Australia) C Wheeler	3	3
(South Africa) N de Villiers (Russia) A Jidkova	6	6
(Czech Republic) D Bedáňová (Italy) R Vinci	4	1
(France) M Pierce (Australia) R Stubbs	6	6
(United States) A Augustus (South Africa) N Grandin	3	2
15	(Italy) S Farina Elia (Italy) T Garbin	6	6
10	(Belgium) E Callens (Japan) R Fujiwara	3	7^{7}	4
(Germany) B Rittner (Venezuela) M Vento-Kabchi	6	6^{1}	6
(South Africa) K Grant (United Kingdom) J Pullin	5	2
(Hungary) K Marosi (United States) S Reeves	7	6
(Argentina) ME Salerni (Sweden) Å Svensson	6	6
(Spain) M Marrero (Paraguay) R de los Ríos	3	2
WC	(Australia) A Grahame (Australia) C Watson	1	1
6	(United States) L Davenport (United States) L Raymond	6	6

Second round
4	(Zimbabwe) C Black (Russia) E Likhovtseva	6	6
(South Africa) N de Villiers (Russia) A Jidkova	4	2
(France) M Pierce (Australia) R Stubbs	6	7
15	(Italy) S Farina Elia (Italy) T Garbin	1	5
(Germany) B Rittner (Venezuela) M Vento-Kabchi	6	4	6
(Hungary) K Marosi (United States) S Reeves	2	6	2
(Argentina) ME Salerni (Sweden) Å Svensson	1	2
6	(United States) L Davenport (United States) L Raymond	6	6

Third round
4	(Zimbabwe) C Black (Russia) E Likhovtseva	3	6	1
(France) M Pierce (Australia) R Stubbs	6	2	6
(Germany) B Rittner (Venezuela) M Vento-Kabchi	3	4
6	(United States) L Davenport (United States) L Raymond	6	6

Quarterfinals
(France) M Pierce (Australia) R Stubbs	1	5
6	(United States) L Davenport (United States) L Raymond	6	7

=== Bottom half ===
==== Section 3 ====
First round
5	(Slovakia) D Hantuchová (United States) M Shaughnessy	7^{8}	6
(Australia) L McShea (Kazakhstan) I Selyutina	6^{6}	1
(Slovenia) M Matevžič (Slovakia) H Nagyová	6	6
(Netherlands) K Boogert (Spain) M Serna	4	3
(Germany) A Glass (Germany) M Weingärtner	3	1
(France) N Dechy (France) É Loit	6	6
(Croatia) I Majoli (Bulgaria) M Maleeva	1	4
11	(Chinese Taipei) J Lee (Indonesia) W Prakusya	6	6
13	(Austria) B Schett (Austria) P Wartusch	6	4	3
(United States) J Hopkins (Croatia) J Kostanić	2	6	6
(United States) T Ashley (United States) A Spears	2	6	5
(Hungary) Z Gubacsi (Spain) C Martínez Granados	6	4	7
(Switzerland) E Gagliardi (Hungary) P Mandula	6	6
(Spain) MJ Martínez Sánchez (Spain) A Medina Garrigues	3	2
(Ukraine) T Perebiynis (Croatia) S Talaja	4	6	3
3	(Russia) E Dementieva (Slovakia) J Husárová	6	4	6

Second round
5	(Slovakia) D Hantuchová (United States) M Shaughnessy	w/o
(Slovenia) M Matevžič (Slovakia) H Nagyová
(France) N Dechy (France) É Loit	6	2	6
11	(Chinese Taipei) J Lee (Indonesia) W Prakusya	3	6	4
(United States) J Hopkins (Croatia) J Kostanić	6	5	2
(Hungary) Z Gubacsi (Spain) C Martínez Granados	1	7	6
(Switzerland) E Gagliardi (Hungary) P Mandula	6	3	6
3	(Russia) E Dementieva (Slovakia) J Husárová	2	6	0

Third round
5	(Slovakia) D Hantuchová (United States) M Shaughnessy	6	6
(France) N Dechy (France) É Loit	3	3
(Hungary) Z Gubacsi (Spain) C Martínez Granados	6^{4}	2
(Switzerland) E Gagliardi (Hungary) P Mandula	7^{7}	6

Quarterfinals
5	(Slovakia) D Hantuchová (United States) M Shaughnessy	4	2
(Switzerland) E Gagliardi (Hungary) P Mandula	6	6

==== Section 4 ====
First round
8	(Spain) C Martínez (Russia) N Petrova	6	3	7^{7}
(United States) A Harkleroad (Argentina) P Tarabini	4	6	6^{2}
WC	(China) T Li (China) T Sun	7^{7}	4	4
(Romania) A Vanc (Netherlands) A van Exel	6^{1}	6	6
(Australia) E Dominikovic (Australia) B Stewart	1	3
(Japan) S Asagoe (Japan) N Miyagi	6	6
(United States) A Stevenson (Canada) V Webb	6	0	2
9	(Russia) A Kournikova (United States) C Rubin	0	6	6
14	(Russia) E Bovina (Belgium) J Henin-Hardenne	6	6
(Republic of Ireland) K Liggan (Indonesia) A Widjaja	4	0
(Ukraine) E Tatarkova (Czech Republic) R Voráčová	7^{7}	6
WC	(Australia) S Stone (Australia) S Stosur	6^{5}	3
(Greece) E Daniilidou (Netherlands) C Vis	3	4
WC	(France) M Bartoli (Russia) M Sharapova	6	6
(Russia) L Krasnoroutskaya (Russia) T Panova	5	4
2	(Spain) V Ruano Pascual (Argentina) P Suárez	7	6

Second round
8	(Spain) C Martínez (Russia) N Petrova	6	4	6
(Romania) A Vanc (Netherlands) A van Exel	2	6	1
(Japan) S Asagoe (Japan) N Miyagi	1	0
9	(Russia) A Kournikova (United States) C Rubin	6	6
14	(Russia) E Bovina (Belgium) J Henin-Hardenne	6^{3}	6	6
(Ukraine) E Tatarkova (Czech Republic) R Voráčová	7^{7}	0	0
WC	(France) M Bartoli (Russia) M Sharapova	3	6	1
2	(Spain) V Ruano Pascual (Argentina) P Suárez	6	2	6

Third round
8	(Spain) C Martínez (Russia) N Petrova	6^{3}	6	6
9	(Russia) A Kournikova (United States) C Rubin	7^{7}	3	3
14	(Russia) E Bovina (Belgium) J Henin-Hardenne
2	(Spain) V Ruano Pascual (Argentina) P Suárez	w/o

Quarterfinals
8	(Spain) C Martínez (Russia) N Petrova	6	5	6^{3}
2	(Spain) V Ruano Pascual (Argentina) P Suárez	2	7	7^{7}
