= 2003 Australian Open – Boys' singles =

Boys' singles
- 2003 Australian Open

Final
- Champion: (Cyprus) Marcos Baghdatis
- Runner-up: (Romania) Florin Mergea
- Score: 6–4, 6–4

Events
Singles	men	women		boys	girls
Doubles	men	women	mixed	boys	girls
WC Singles	men	women	quad
WC Doubles	men	women	quad
Legends	men	women	mixed
- Australian Open

Clément Morel was the defending champion, but did not compete in the Juniors in this year.

Marcos Baghdatis defeated Florin Mergea (6–4, 6–4) in the final. Baghdatis would later reach the final of the men's tournament in 2006, losing to Roger Federer.

== Seeds ==
1. (Cyprus) Marcos Baghdatis (champion)
2. (United States) Brian Baker (third round)
3. (United States) Chris Kwon (first round)
4. (France) Mathieu Montcourt (semifinals)
5. (France) Jo-Wilfried Tsonga (semifinals)
6. (Romania) Florin Mergea (final)
7. (Romania) Adrian Ungur (first round)
8. (Australia) Chris Guccione (third round)
9. (United States) Scott Oudsema (first round)
10. (Aruba) Jose-Luis Muguruza (second round)
11. (United Kingdom) David Brewer (second round)
12. (United States) Phillip Simmonds (quarterfinals)
13. (United States) Jarrett Chirico (second round)
14. (France) Gaël Monfils (quarterfinals)
15. (Romania) Horia Tecău (third round)
16. (Germany) Mischa Zverev (third round)

== Draw ==
Key

- Q = Qualifier
- WC = Wild card
- LL = Lucky loser
- Alt = Alternate
- ITF = ITF entry
- PR = Protected ranking
- SR = Special ranking
- SE = Special exempt
- JE = Junior exempt
- JR = Junior Accelerator Programme entrant
- CO = College Accelerator Programme entrant
- NG = Next Gen Accelerator Program entrant
- w/o = Walkover
- r = Retired
- d = Defaulted

=== Finals ===
Quarterfinals
1	(Cyprus) Marcos Baghdatis	6	6
(United States) Brendan Evans	2	2
(Germany) Eric Scherer	1	1
5	(France) Jo-Wilfried Tsonga	6	6
12	(United States) Phillip Simmonds	0	2
4	(France) Mathieu Montcourt	6	6
6	(Romania) Florin Mergea	6	6
14	(France) Gaël Monfils	3	2

Semifinals
1	(Cyprus) Marcos Baghdatis	6	7^{11}
5	(France) Jo-Wilfried Tsonga	4	6^{9}
4	(France) Mathieu Montcourt	2	6^{5}
6	(Romania) Florin Mergea	6	7^{7}

Final
1	(Cyprus) Marcos Baghdatis	6	6
6	(Romania) Florin Mergea	4	4

=== Top half ===
==== Section 1 ====
First round
1	(Cyprus) Marcos Baghdatis	7	6
(Portugal) Fred Gil	5	3
(South Africa) David North	7	5	1
(Czech Republic) Lukáš Rosol	5	7	6
(Australia) Alexander Petropoulos	3	1
(France) Josselin Ouanna	6	6
(Hong Kong) Brian Hung	6	0	1
13	(United States) Jarrett Chirico	1	6	6
9	(United States) Scott Oudsema	3	2
(United Kingdom) Guy Thomas	6	6
(India) Somdev Devvarman	5	6	6
(Germany) Rick Schmidt	7	4	2
(Australia) Robert Smeets	3	3
(United States) Brendan Evans	6	6
(Austria) Bernhard Deussner	7	6
7	(Romania) Adrian Ungur	5	4

Second round
1	(Cyprus) M Baghdatis	4	6	6
(Czech Republic) L Rosol	6	1	2
(France) J Ouanna	6	6
13	(United States) J Chirico	2	4
(United Kingdom) G Thomas	6	6
(India) S Devvarman	0	2
(United States) B Evans	6	6
(Austria) B Deussner	1	2

Third round
1	(Cyprus) M Baghdatis	6	6
(France) J Ouanna	4	3
(United Kingdom) G Thomas	1	6	2
(United States) B Evans	6	4	6

Quarterfinals
1	(Cyprus) M Baghdatis	6	6
(United States) B Evans	2	2

==== Section 2 ====
First round
3	(United States) Chris Kwon	3	2
Q	(Canada) Dejan Cvetkovic	6	6
(Germany) Eric Scherer	6	6
(Australia) Christopher Singh	4	3
Q	(Australia) Todd Ley	4	6^{2}
Q	(South Korea) Woong-Sun Jun	6	7^{7}
WC	(Australia) Patrick Jozwik	3	1
15	(Romania) Horia Tecău	6	6
10	(Aruba) Jose-Luis Muguruza	6	6
WC	(Australia) Clint Harris	3	1
(Ukraine) Sergiy Stakhovsky	6	6
(Croatia) Goran Belosevic	4	0
Q	(Netherlands) Jimmy Schneider	6^{2}	7	0
(Australia) Adam Feeney	7^{7}	5	6
WC	(Australia) Chris Biro	0	2
5	(France) Jo-Wilfried Tsonga	6	6

Second round
Q	(Canada) D Cvetkovic	3	6^{4}
(Germany) E Scherer	6	7^{7}
Q	(South Korea) W-S Jun	4	1
15	(Romania) H Tecău	6	6
10	(Aruba) J-L Muguruza	1	2
(Ukraine) S Stakhovsky	6	6
(Australia) A Feeney	2	3
5	(France) J-W Tsonga	6	6

Third round
(Germany) E Scherer	6^{3}	6	6
15	(Romania) H Tecău	7^{7}	1	4
(Ukraine) S Stakhovsky	4	0^{r}
5	(France) J-W Tsonga	6	2

Quarterfinals
(Germany) E Scherer	1	1
5	(France) J-W Tsonga	6	6

=== Bottom half ===
==== Section 3 ====
First round
8	(Australia) Chris Guccione	6	6
Q	(United States) Ruben Gonzales	2	3
(Czech Republic) Roman Kutac	6^{5}	7^{7}	2
(Venezuela) Juan de Armas	7^{7}	6^{3}	6
Q	(Canada) Andrei Radulescu	4	3
WC	(Australia) David Jeflea	6	2^{r}
(Latvia) Andis Juška	3	5
12	(United States) Phillip Simmonds	6	7
16	(Germany) Mischa Zverev	7	6
WC	(Australia) Chris Letcher	5	4
(United Kingdom) Richard Irwin	4	4
(New Zealand) G.D. Jones	6	6
(India) Karan Rastogi	6	6
WC	(Australia) Lachlan Ferguson	2	2
(Serbia and Montenegro) Karolj Fodor	4	2
4	(France) Mathieu Montcourt	6	6

Second round
8	(Australia) C Guccione	6	6
(Venezuela) J de Armas	1	1
Q	(Canada) A Radulescu	1	1
12	(United States) P Simmonds	6	6
16	(Germany) M Zverev	6	6
(New Zealand) G.D. Jones	3	0
(India) K Rastogi	4	5
4	(France) M Montcourt	6	7

Third round
8	(Australia) C Guccione	6^{6}	4
12	(United States) P Simmonds	7^{8}	6
16	(Germany) M Zverev	2	3
4	(France) M Montcourt	6	6

Quarterfinals
12	(United States) P Simmonds	0	2
4	(France) M Montcourt	6	6

==== Section 4 ====
First round
6	(Romania) Florin Mergea	6	7^{7}
Q	(Ukraine) Sergei Bubka	2	6^{2}
(Germany) Marco Hosang	6	6
(Australia) Fotis Fotakis	4	2
(Austria) Patrick Woelfler	7	6
(Georgia (country)) Lado Chikhladze	5	4
(Hungary) Adrian Szatmary	4	2
11	(United Kingdom) David Brewer	6	6
14	(France) Gaël Monfils	6	6
Q	(Sweden) Ervin Eleskovic	2	4
WC	(Australia) David Galic	3	3
WC	(Australia) Joel Kerley	6	6
(South Korea) Suk Hyun-joon	7	6
(Russia) Artem Sitak	5	1
(Japan) Kenichiro Nakahara	2	1
2	(United States) Brian Baker	6	6

Second round
6	(Romania) F Mergea	6	6
(Germany) M Hosang	2	2
(Austria) P Woelfler	7	0	6
11	(United Kingdom) D Brewer	5	6	2
14	(France) G Monfils	3	7	6
WC	(Australia) J Kerley	6	5	3
(South Korea) H-j Suk	6	2	7
2	(United States) B Baker	4	6	9

Third round
6	(Romania) F Mergea	3	6	6
(Austria) P Woelfler	6	3	3
14	(France) G Monfils	6	6
2	(United States) B Baker	4	4

Quarterfinals
6	(Romania) F Mergea	6	6
14	(France) G Monfils	3	2

== Sources ==
- Draw
