= 2003 Australian Open – Mixed doubles =

Mixed doubles
- 2003 Australian Open

Final
- Champions: (United States) Martina Navratilova (India) Leander Paes
- Runners-up: (Greece) Eleni Daniilidou (Australia) Todd Woodbridge
- Score: 6–4, 7–5

Details
- Draw: 32
- Seeds: 8

Events
Singles	men	women		boys	girls
Doubles	men	women	mixed	boys	girls
WC Singles	men	women	quad
WC Doubles	men	women	quad
Legends	men	women	mixed
- Australian Open

Martina Navratilova and Leander Paes defeated Eleni Daniilidou and Todd Woodbridge in the final, 6–4, 7–5 to win the mixed doubles tennis title at the 2003 Australian Open. It was Navratilova's first Australian Open mixed doubles title and eighth mixed doubles title overall, and the first Australian Open and second mixed doubles title for Paes. With the win, Navratilova became the fourth woman in history to complete the career Grand Slam in mixed doubles, and became only the third player in history to complete the "Boxed Set" (career Grand Slams in singles, same-sex doubles, and mixed doubles).

Daniela Hantuchová and Kevin Ullyett were the defending champions, but lost in the semifinals to Navratilova and Paes.

== Seeds ==
1. (Slovakia) Janette Husárová / (Belarus) Max Mirnyi (first round)
2. (United States) Lisa Raymond / (United States) Mike Bryan (second round)
3. (Russia) Elena Likhovtseva / (The Bahamas) Mark Knowles (second round)
4. (Australia) Rennae Stubbs / (United States) Donald Johnson (semifinals)
5. (Slovakia) Daniela Hantuchová / (Zimbabwe) Kevin Ullyett (semifinals)
6. (Zimbabwe) Cara Black / (Zimbabwe) Wayne Black (first round)
7. (Chinese Taipei) Janet Lee / (United States) Jared Palmer (quarterfinals)
8. (Japan) Rika Fujiwara / (United States) Brian MacPhie (first round)

== Draw ==
Key

- Q = Qualifier
- WC = Wild card
- LL = Lucky loser
- Alt = Alternate
- ITF = ITF entry
- PR = Protected ranking
- SR = Special ranking
- SE = Special exempt
- JE = Junior exempt
- JR = Junior Accelerator Programme entrant
- CO = College Accelerator Programme entrant
- NG = Next Gen Accelerator Program entrant
- w/o = Walkover
- r = Retired
- d = Defaulted

=== Finals ===
Semifinals
5	(Slovakia) Daniela Hantuchová (Zimbabwe) Kevin Ullyett	3	1
WC	(United States) Martina Navratilova (India) Leander Paes	6	6
4	(Australia) Rennae Stubbs (United States) Donald Johnson	4	2
WC	(Greece) Eleni Daniilidou (Australia) Todd Woodbridge	6	6

Final
WC	(United States) Martina Navratilova (India) Leander Paes	6	7
WC	(Greece) Eleni Daniilidou (Australia) Todd Woodbridge	4	5

=== Top half ===
First round
1	(Slovakia) J Husárová (Belarus) M Mirnyi	2	7	[7]
(Indonesia) W Prakusya (South Africa) D Adams	6	5	[10]
(Austria) B Schett (Australia) J Eagle	6	7
(France) É Loit (Czech Republic) C Suk	2	5
(Slovenia) K Srebotnik (United States) B Bryan	6	4	[5]
(Japan) A Sugiyama (Japan) T Shimada	4	6	[10]
(Spain) V Ruano Pascual (Argentina) A Schneiter	1	0^{r}
5	(Slovakia) D Hantuchová (Zimbabwe) K Ullyett	6	0
3	(Russia) E Likhovtseva (The Bahamas) M Knowles	7^{7}	7^{7}
(Russia) S Kuznetsova (South Africa) J Coetzee	6^{1}	6^{4}
WC	(United States) M Navratilova (India) L Paes	6	7
WC	(Australia) L McShea (Australia) S Draper	3	5
WC	(Australia) E Dominikovic (Australia) N Healey	7^{9}	3	[10]
WC	(Australia) N Pratt (Australia) A Florent	6^{7}	6	[7]
(Uzbekistan) I Tulyaganova (India) M Bhupathi	6	6
8	(Japan) R Fujiwara (United States) B MacPhie	2	2

Second round
(Indonesia) W Prakusya (South Africa) D Adams	6	1	[10]
(Austria) B Schett (Australia) J Eagle	4	6	[7]
(Japan) A Sugiyama (Japan) T Shimada	6	3	[4]
5	(Slovakia) D Hantuchová (Zimbabwe) K Ullyett	2	6	[10]
3	(Russia) E Likhovtseva (The Bahamas) M Knowles	2	4
WC	(United States) M Navratilova (India) L Paes	6	6
WC	(Australia) E Dominikovic (Australia) N Healey	6^{6}	6	[3]
(Uzbekistan) I Tulyaganova (India) M Bhupathi	7^{8}	1	[10]

Quarterfinals
(Indonesia) W Prakusya (South Africa) D Adams	6^{1}	6^{3}
5	(Slovakia) D Hantuchová (Zimbabwe) K Ullyett	7^{7}	7^{7}
WC	(United States) M Navratilova (India) L Paes	6	6
(Uzbekistan) I Tulyaganova (India) M Bhupathi	4	3

Semifinals
5	(Slovakia) D Hantuchová (Zimbabwe) K Ullyett	3	1
WC	(United States) M Navratilova (India) L Paes	6	6

=== Bottom half ===
First round
7	(Chinese Taipei) J Lee (United States) J Palmer	7	6
WC	(Australia) B Stewart (Australia) J Crabb	5	4
WC	(Russia) A Kournikova (United States) A Bogomolov Jr.	6	6
(Argentina) P Tarabini (Argentina) L Arnold	4	2
(Italy) R Grande (Czech Republic) M Damm	2	6	[10]
(Italy) S Farina Elia (Argentina) G Etlis	6	3	[7]
WC	(Australia) C Wheeler (Australia) P Luczak	2	6^{4}
4	(Australia) R Stubbs (United States) D Johnson	6	7^{7}
6	(Zimbabwe) C Black (Zimbabwe) W Black	3	4
(Netherlands) K Boogert (Canada) D Nestor	6	6
(Slovenia) T Križan (Czech Republic) D Rikl	4	2
(Belgium) E Callens (South Africa) R Koenig	6	6
(Netherlands) C Vis (Australia) M Hill	4	6^{5}
WC	(Greece) E Daniilidou (Australia) T Woodbridge	6	7^{7}
(Australia) C Barclay (Australia) S Stolle	4	1
2	(United States) L Raymond (United States) M Bryan	6	6

Second round
7	(Chinese Taipei) J Lee (United States) J Palmer	w/o
WC	(Russia) A Kournikova (United States) A Bogomolov Jr.
(Italy) R Grande (Czech Republic) M Damm	2	3
4	(Australia) R Stubbs (United States) D Johnson	6	6
(Netherlands) K Boogert (Canada) D Nestor	2	2
(Belgium) E Callens (South Africa) R Koenig	6	6
WC	(Greece) E Daniilidou (Australia) T Woodbridge	7^{7}	6
2	(United States) L Raymond (United States) M Bryan	6^{3}	4

Quarterfinals
7	(Chinese Taipei) J Lee (United States) J Palmer	4	4
4	(Australia) R Stubbs (United States) D Johnson	6	6
(Belgium) E Callens (South Africa) R Koenig	3	2
WC	(Greece) E Daniilidou (Australia) T Woodbridge	6	6

Semifinals
4	(Australia) R Stubbs (United States) D Johnson	4	2
WC	(Greece) E Daniilidou (Australia) T Woodbridge	6	6
