= Todd Larkham =

Australian tennis player

- Country (sports): Australia
- Residence: Canberra
- Born: 13 October 1974 (age 51) Canberra, Australia
- Height: 1.78 m (5 ft 10 in)
- Turned pro: 1993
- Plays: Right-handed (one-handed backhand)
- Prize money: $306,108

Singles
- Career record: 3–14
- Career titles: 0
- Highest ranking: No. 136 (8 September 2003)

Grand Slam singles results
- Australian Open: 2R (2003)
- French Open: 1R (2003)
- Wimbledon: 2R (1997)
- US Open: 1R (1997)

Doubles
- Career record: 3–10
- Career titles: 0
- Highest ranking: No. 168 (14 December 1998)

Grand Slam doubles results
- Australian Open: 2R (1996, 1998)
- Wimbledon: 1R (1995)

Todd Larkham (born 13 October 1974) is a former professional tennis player from Australia. He is the younger brother of Brent Larkham, a former player who coached him towards the end of his career.

== Career ==
Larkham twice made the second round of a Grand Slam singles draw, both times as a qualifier. His first victory came against Ctislav Doseděl at the 1997 Wimbledon Championships, in four sets, after losing the first. In the 2003 Australian Open he defeated Cecil Mamiit to set up a second round meeting with tournament favourite Lleyton Hewitt. He was easily defeated by the top seeded Hewitt, only able to win two games for the match. It was the second time he faced the world number one at their home Grand Slam, having lost to Pete Sampras in the 1997 US Open.

== Challenger Titles ==
=== Singles: (1) ===
No.	Year	Tournament	Surface	Opponent in the final	Score in the final
1.	2003	Scheveningen, Netherlands	Clay	(Argentina) Diego Veronelli	7–6^{(7–4)}, 4–6, 6–4

=== Doubles: (2) ===
No.	Year	Tournament	Surface	Partner	Opponents in the final	Score in the final
1.	1998	Olbia, Italy	Hard	(United Kingdom) Chris Wilkinson	(Japan) Thomas Shimada (Switzerland) Filippo Veglio	3–6, 6–3, 7–6
2.	2002	Grenoble, France	Hard	(Australia) Michael Tebbutt	(Italy) Massimo Bertolini (Italy) Cristian Brandi	4–6, 6–3, 6–4
