= Zuzana Kučová =

Slovak tennis player

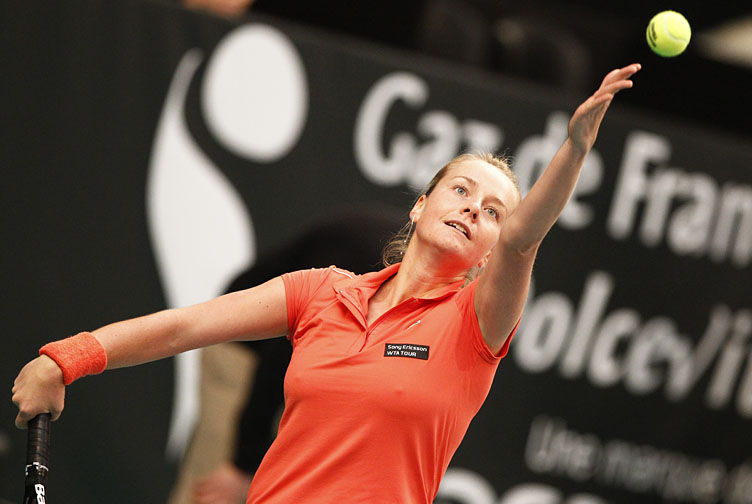
- Kučová at the 2010 Open GDF Suez
- Country (sports): Slovakia
- Residence: Bratislava
- Born: 26 June 1982 (age 42); Bratislava, Czechoslovakia
- Height: 1.70 m (5 ft 7 in)
- Turned pro: 2000
- Retired: 2013
- Plays: Right-handed (two-handed backhand)
- Prize money: $418,032

Singles
- Career record: 328–258
- Career titles: 8 ITF
- Highest ranking: No. 101 (7 June 2010)

Grand Slam singles results
- Australian Open: 1R (2010)
- French Open: 2R (2013)
- Wimbledon: 1R (2010)
- US Open: 1R (2010)

Doubles
- Career record: 104–106
- Career titles: 4 ITF
- Highest ranking: No. 175 (7 December 2009)

Zuzana Kučová (Slovak pronunciation: [ˈzuzana ˈkutʂɔʋaː]; born 26 June 1982) is a former Slovak tennis player.

She won eight singles titles and four doubles titles on the ITF Women's Circuit. On 7 June 2010, she reached her best singles ranking of world No. 101. In December 2009, she peaked at No. 175 in the WTA doubles rankings. She is the sister of Kristína Kučová, also professional tennis player.

== Career ==
Kučová qualified for the 2004 French Open, and drew 10th seed Vera Zvonareva in the first round of the clay-court tournament. She struggled to find a way past the Russian and was beaten in straight sets.

In 2008, Kučová competed at the 2008 GDF Suez Grand Prix in Budapest, Hungary. She knocked young Swiss player Timea Bacsinszky out of the tournament in the opening round, but failed to defeat hometown favourite Gréta Arn in the second, bowing out in straight sets.

Kučová qualified for her second Grand Slam championship, the 2010 Australian Open, by beating Julia Schruff in the third round of qualifying. She drew Gisela Dulko in the opening round, and after a first set shocker that lasted just 18 minutes, Kučová fought back, but was ultimately knocked out in three sets. Following 18 months absent from the tennis court, Kučová qualified for her first Grand Slam main-draw appearance in three years at the 2013 French Open. There, she caused a huge upset by defeating 24th seed Julia Görges in straight sets. In the second round, she lost to Virginie Razzano in three sets. Her last professional tournament was at the 2013 French Open.

== Personal life ==
Kučová's younger sister Kristína is also a tennis player.

== ITF finals ==
Legend
$100,000 tournaments
$75,000 tournaments
$50,000 tournaments
$25,000 tournaments
$10,000 tournaments

=== Singles: 24 (8–16) ===
Outcome	No	Date	Tournament	Surface	Opponent	Score
Runner-up	1.	10 September 2000	ITF Zadar, Croatia	Clay	(Switzerland) Myriam Casanova	4–6, 1–6
Runner-up	2.	8 October 2000	ITF Cairo, Egypt	Clay	(Austria) Sandra Klemenschits	4–1, 4–2, 1–4, 4–5^{(4)}, 3–5
Winner	1.	24 June 2001	ITF Algiers, Algeria	Clay	(France) Mathilde Johansson	6–3, 6–3
Runner-up	3.	29 July 2001	ITF Horb, Germany	Clay	(Czech Republic) Lenka Novotná	5–7, 4–6
Runner-up	4.	2 September 2001	ITF Bad Saulgau, Germany	Clay	(Germany) Lisa Fritz	1–6, 0–6
Runner-up	5.	30 September 2001	ITF Verona, Italy	Clay	(Germany) Angelika Rösch	4–6, 0–6
Runner-up	6.	2 June 2002	ITF Mostar, Bosnia and Herzegovina	Clay	(Austria) Sybille Bammer	6–2, 4–6, 5–7
Runner-up	7.	14 July 2002	ITF Darmstadt, Germany	Clay	(Germany) Sandra Klösel	4–6, 6–7^{(3)}
Winner	2.	30 March 2003	ITF Rome, Italy	Clay	(Romania) Delia Sescioreanu	6–3, 6–7^{(5)}, 6–0
Runner-up	8.	19 September 2004	ITF Sofia, Bulgaria	Clay	(Hungary) Virág Németh	1–5 ret.
Runner-up	9.	29 May 2005	ITF Campobasso, Italy	Clay	(Ukraine) Mariya Koryttseva	7–5, 1–6, 5–7
Runner-up	10.	9 April 2006	ITF Athens, Greece	Clay	(France) Aurélie Védy	2–6, 7–5, 3–6
Winner	3.	15 December 2007	Lagos Open, Nigeria	Hard	(Germany) Syna Kayser	6–2, 6–2
Runner-up	11.	22 December 2007	Lagos Open, Nigeria	Hard	(South Africa) Chanelle Scheepers	2–6, 0–6
Winner	4.	25 October 2008	Lagos Open, Nigeria	Hard	(Romania) Ágnes Szatmári	7–6^{(5)}, 4–6, 6–3
Runner-up	12.	14 June 2009	ITF Zlín, Czech Republic	Clay	(Slovenia) Polona Hercog	3–6, 1–6
Runner-up	13.	19 July 2009	ITF Darmstadt, Germany	Clay	(Germany) Sarah Gronert	1–6, 1–6
Runner-up	14.	10 October 2009	ITF Jounieh, Lebanon	Clay	(Romania) Alexandra Dulgheru	6–3, 3–6, 4–6
Winner	5.	16 October 2009	Lagos Open, Nigeria	Hard	(Greece) Anna Gerasimou	6–3, 7–5
Winner	6.	24 October 2009	Lagos Open, Nigeria	Hard	(Russia) Nina Bratchikova	6–0, 7–6^{(5)}
Runner-up	15.	3 April 2010	ITF Monzón, Spain	Hard	(Belarus) Anastasiya Yakimova	4–6, 6–4, 3–6
Winner	7.	24 April 2010	ITF Bari, Italy	Clay	(Czech Republic) Zuzana Ondrášková	6–4, 6–2
Winner	8.	23 October 2010	Lagos Open, Nigeria	Hard	(France) Natalie Piquion	6–2, 6–0
Runner-up	16.	30 October 2010	Lagos Open, Nigeria	Hard	(Russia) Nina Bratchikova	5–7, 1–6

=== Doubles: 8 (4–4) ===
Outcome	No	Date	Tournament	Surface	Partner	Opponents	Score
Runner-up	1.	6 August 2000	ITF Bucharest, Romania	Clay	(Czech Republic) Dominika Luzarová	(Romania) Liana Ungur (Romania) Edina Gallovits-Hall	5–7, 0–4 ret.
Runner-up	2.	15 October 2000	ITF Cairo, Egypt	Clay	(Czech Republic) Barbora Blahutiaková	(Austria) Sandra Klemenschits (Austria) Daniela Klemenschits	0–4, 0–4, 0–4
Winner	1.	25 March 2001	ITF Rome, Italy	Clay	(Czech Republic) Iveta Benešová	(Italy) Claudia Ivone (Italy) Roberta Vinci	4–6, 6–4, 6–4
Runner-up	3.	29 July 2001	ITF Horb, Germany	Clay	(Slovakia) Martina Strussová	(Germany) Annette Kolb (Croatia) Ivana Zupá	6–7^{(0)}, 2–6
Winner	2.	2 September 2001	ITF Bad Saulgau, Germany	Clay	(Czech Republic) Renata Kučerová	(Czech Republic) Gabriela Chmelinová (Czech Republic) Lenka Novotná	w/o
Runner-up	4.	22 January 2006	ITF Fort Walton Beach, United States	Hard	(South Africa) Chanelle Scheepers	(Canada) Maureen Drake (Czech Republic) Vladimíra Uhlířová	6–2, 4–6, 5–7
Winner	3.	17 March 2007	ITF Cairo, Egypt	Clay (i)	(Slovakia) Kristína Kučová	(United Kingdom) Melissa Berry (Netherlands) Michelle Gerards	6–7^{(3)}, 6–4, 6–3
Winner	4.	13 June 2009	ITF Zlín, Czech Republic	Clay	(Slovakia) Kristína Kučová	(Czech Republic) Nikola Fraňková (Germany) Carmen Klaschka	6–3, 6–4

== Grand Slam singles performance timeline ==
Key
W	F	SF	QF	#R	RR	Q#	DNQ	A	NH

(W) winner; (F) finalist; (SF) semifinalist; (QF) quarterfinalist; (#R) rounds 4, 3, 2, 1; (RR) round-robin stage; (Q#) qualification round; (DNQ) did not qualify; (A) absent; (NH) not held; (SR) strike rate (events won / competed); (W–L) win–loss record.

Tournament	2002	2003	2004	2005	2006	2007	2008	2009	2010	2011	2012	2013	W–L
Australian Open	A	Q1	Q1	Q1	A	A	A	Q2	1R	Q3	A	A	0–1
French Open	A	Q2	1R	A	Q1	A	A	Q1	Q3	Q1	A	2R	1–2
Wimbledon	A	Q2	Q1	Q1	A	A	A	Q1	1R	Q3	A	A	0–1
US Open	Q3	Q1	Q1	A	A	A	Q1	Q2	1R	Q1	A	A	0–1
