= 2003 Australian Open – Women's singles =

Women's singles
- 2003 Australian Open

Final
- Champion: (United States) Serena Williams
- Runner-up: (United States) Venus Williams
- Score: 7–6^{(7–4)}, 3–6, 6–4

Details
- Draw: 128
- Seeds: 32

Events
Singles	men	women		boys	girls
Doubles	men	women	mixed	boys	girls
WC Singles	men	women	quad
WC Doubles	men	women	quad
Legends	men	women	mixed
- Australian Open

Serena Williams defeated her sister Venus Williams in the final, 7–6^{(7–4)}, 3–6, 6–4 to win the women's singles tennis title at the 2003 Australian Open. It was her first Australian Open singles title, fifth major singles title overall and her fourth consecutive major singles triumph, completing both a non-calendar year Grand Slam and the Career Grand Slam. It was Venus' record fourth consecutive runner-up finish at a major, losing every final to Serena. Serena saved two match points en route to the title, against Kim Clijsters in the semifinals (where at one point in the third set Serena was 1–5 down).

Jennifer Capriati was the two-time defending champion, but lost to Marlene Weingärtner in the first round. Capriati's loss marked the first time the defending Australian Open champion lost in the first round, and the first time at any major that the defending champion lost in the first round since Steffi Graf at the 1994 Wimbledon Championships. With Lindsay Davenport's defeat in the fourth round, a first-time Australian Open champion was guaranteed.

This marked the final Australian Open appearance of four-time champion Monica Seles; she lost to Klára Koukalová in the second round. It was also the first Australian Open final without Martina Hingis since 1996.

This marked the first major appearance of two future world No. 1's: five-time major champion Maria Sharapova and Jelena Janković, who lost to Koukalová and Amanda Coetzer in the first and second rounds respectively. It was also the major main draw debut of future US Open champion Flavia Pennetta, who lost to Silvia Farina Elia in the first round.

== Seeds ==
1. (United States) Serena Williams (champion)
2. (United States) Venus Williams (final)
3. (United States) Jennifer Capriati (first round)
4. (Belgium) Kim Clijsters (semifinals)
5. (Belgium) Justine Henin-Hardenne (semifinals)
6. (United States) Monica Seles (second round)
7. (Slovakia) Daniela Hantuchová (quarterfinals)
8. (Russia) Anastasia Myskina (quarterfinals)
9. (United States) Lindsay Davenport (fourth round)
10. (United States) Chanda Rubin (fourth round)
11. (Bulgaria) Magdalena Maleeva (third round)
12. (Switzerland) Patty Schnyder (fourth round)
13. (Italy) Silvia Farina Elia (second round)
14. (Israel) Anna Pistolesi (third round)
15. (United States) Alexandra Stevenson (second round)
16. (France) Nathalie Dechy (third round)
17. (Russia) Elena Dementieva (first round)
18. (Greece) Eleni Daniilidou (fourth round)
19. (South Africa) Amanda Coetzer (fourth round)
20. (Russia) Elena Bovina (fourth round)
21. (Japan) Ai Sugiyama (second round)
22. (Luxembourg) Anne Kremer (second round)
23. (Argentina) Paola Suárez (third round)
24. (Russia) Tatiana Panova (third round)
25. (United States) Meghann Shaughnessy (quarterfinals)
26. (Thailand) Tamarine Tanasugarn (third round)
27. (United States) Lisa Raymond (second round)
28. (Argentina) Clarisa Fernández (third round)
29. (Croatia) Iva Majoli (first round)
30. (Slovakia) Janette Husárová (second round)
31. (Spain) Conchita Martínez (first round)
32. (Slovenia) Katarina Srebotnik (third round)

== Draw ==
Key

- Q = Qualifier
- WC = Wild card
- LL = Lucky loser
- Alt = Alternate
- ITF = ITF entry
- PR = Protected ranking
- SR = Special ranking
- SE = Special exempt
- JE = Junior exempt
- JR = Junior Accelerator Programme entrant
- CO = College Accelerator Programme entrant
- NG = Next Gen Accelerator Program entrant
- w/o = Walkover
- r = Retired
- d = Defaulted

=== Finals ===
Quarterfinals
1	(United States) Serena Williams	6	6
25	(United States) Meghann Shaughnessy	2	2
4	(Belgium) Kim Clijsters	6	6
8	(Russia) Anastasia Myskina	2	4
5	(Belgium) Justine Henin-Hardenne	6	6
(Spain) Virginia Ruano Pascual	2	2
7	(Slovakia) Daniela Hantuchová	4	3
2	(United States) Venus Williams	6	6

Semifinals
1	(United States) Serena Williams	4	6	7
4	(Belgium) Kim Clijsters	6	3	5
5	(Belgium) Justine Henin-Hardenne	3	3
2	(United States) Venus Williams	6	6

Final
1	(United States) Serena Williams	7^{7}	3	6
2	(United States) Venus Williams	6^{4}	6	4

=== Top half ===
==== Section 1 ====
First round
1	(United States) S Williams	3	7^{7}	7
(France) É Loit	6	6^{5}	5
(Belgium) E Callens	6	6
(Slovakia) M Suchá	0	2
(Russia) A Jidkova	2	6	6
(United States) L Granville	6	4	0
(Canada) M Drake	0	2
26	(Thailand) T Tanasugarn	6	6
18	(Greece) E Daniilidou	7^{8}	6
(United States) M Irvin	6^{6}	3
(Spain) C Martínez Granados	0	1
(United States) A Frazier	6	6
(Czech Republic) D Bedáňová	6	5	6
(Czech Republic) I Benešová	3	7	4
(United States) S Taylor	2	3
16	(France) N Dechy	6	6

Second round
1	(United States) S Williams	6	6
(Belgium) E Callens	4	0
(Russia) A Jidkova	2	6	3
26	(Thailand) T Tanasugarn	6	3	6
18	(Greece) E Daniilidou	6	6
(United States) A Frazier	1	2
(Czech Republic) D Bedáňová	3	3
16	(France) N Dechy	6	6

Third round
1	(United States) S Williams	6	6
26	(Thailand) T Tanasugarn	1	1
18	(Greece) E Daniilidou	6	6
16	(France) N Dechy	4	3

Fourth round
1	(United States) S Williams	6	6
18	(Greece) E Daniilidou	4	1

==== Section 2 ====
First round
11	(Bulgaria) M Maleeva	6	6
(France) M Bartoli	4	1
(Denmark) E Dyrberg	3	3
(South Korea) Y-j Cho	6	6
(Hungary) A Kapros	0	1
(Italy) R Grande	6	6
(Russia) V Zvonareva	2	1
20	(Russia) E Bovina	6	6
25	(United States) M Shaughnessy	4	6	6
Q	(Spain) N Llagostera Vives	6	3	3
(Argentina) M Díaz-Oliva	6^{2}	2
(Slovakia) Ľ Cervanová	7^{7}	6
Q	(Czech Republic) K Koukalová	6	7^{8}
Q	(Russia) M Sharapova	4	6^{6}
(Slovakia) Ľ Kurhajcová	0	1
6	(United States) M Seles	6	6

Second round
11	(Bulgaria) M Maleeva	2	6	6
(South Korea) Y-j Cho	6	4	1
(Italy) R Grande	1	2
20	(Russia) E Bovina	6	6
25	(United States) M Shaughnessy	6	6
(Slovakia) Ľ Cervanová	1	1
Q	(Czech Republic) K Koukalová	6^{6}	7	6
6	(United States) M Seles	7^{8}	5	3

Third round
11	(Bulgaria) M Maleeva	5	6	5
20	(Russia) E Bovina	7	4	7
25	(United States) M Shaughnessy	6	6
Q	(Czech Republic) K Koukalová	1	3

Fourth round
20	(Russia) E Bovina	7	2	4
25	(United States) M Shaughnessy	5	6	6

==== Section 3 ====
First round
4	(Belgium) K Clijsters	6	6
(United States) S Reeves	2	1
(Hungary) P Mandula	7	6
(Croatia) S Talaja	5	1
(Belarus) T Poutchek	6	6
(Slovenia) T Pisnik	3	0
(Spain) C Torrens Valero	6	4	6
29	(Croatia) I Majoli	3	6	4
19	(South Africa) A Coetzer	6	6
(Austria) B Schett	4	3
(Paraguay) R Neffa-de los Ríos	3	3
Q	(Federal Republic of Yugoslavia) J Janković	6	6
(Slovenia) M Matevžič	6^{6}	6	6
WC	(Australia) C Dellacqua	7^{8}	2	2
(United States) M Tu	4	6	2
14	(Israel) A Pistolesi	6	4	6

Second round
4	(Belgium) K Clijsters	6	6
(Hungary) P Mandula	0	0
(Belarus) T Poutchek	2	6	6
(Spain) C Torrens Valero	6	4	4
19	(South Africa) A Coetzer	6	4	6
Q	(Federal Republic of Yugoslavia) J Janković	2	6	4
(Slovenia) M Matevžič	1^{r}
14	(Israel) A Pistolesi	5

Third round
4	(Belgium) K Clijsters	6	6
(Belarus) T Poutchek	2	1
19	(South Africa) A Coetzer	6	6
14	(Israel) A Pistolesi	0	2

Fourth round
4	(Belgium) K Clijsters	6	6
19	(South Africa) A Coetzer	3	1

==== Section 4 ====
First round
10	(United States) C Rubin	6	7
Q	(Hungary) M Czink	4	5
(Austria) P Wartusch	1	4
(France) M Pierce	6	6
(Italy) An Serra Zanetti	7^{7}	6
(Germany) M Müller	6^{5}	0
Q	(Austria) B Schwartz	5	6	6
17	(Russia) E Dementieva	7	4	2
28	(Argentina) C Fernández	6	7
WC	(Australia) A Szili	1	5
(Sweden) Å Svensson	4	6	5
(Spain) M Serna	6	3	7
(Switzerland) M-G Mikaelian	1	0^{r}
(Switzerland) E Gagliardi	6	2
Q	(Slovakia) E Fislová	5	3
8	(Russia) A Myskina	7	6

Second round
10	(United States) C Rubin	0	6	6
(France) M Pierce	6	4	2
(Italy) An Serra Zanetti	1	2
Q	(Austria) B Schwartz	6	6
28	(Argentina) C Fernández	6	6
(Spain) M Serna	3	4
(Switzerland) E Gagliardi	7	2	0
8	(Russia) A Myskina	5	6	6

Third round
10	(United States) C Rubin	6	6
Q	(Austria) B Schwartz	3	2
28	(Argentina) C Fernández	3	6	3
8	(Russia) A Myskina	6	3	6

Fourth round
10	(United States) C Rubin	6	4	1
8	(Russia) A Myskina	4	6	6

=== Bottom half ===
==== Section 5 ====
First round
5	(Belgium) J Henin-Hardenne	6	6
(Switzerland) M Casanova	3	4
(Slovakia) H Nagyová	1	2
(Russia) A Kournikova	6	6
(United States) J Craybas	6^{7}	6	1
(France) V Razzano	7^{9}	4	6
(Russia) D Safina	6	3	3
32	(Slovenia) K Srebotnik	3	6	6
24	(Russia) T Panova	7^{7}	3	6
(Germany) A Rösch	6^{2}	6	2
WC	(Japan) A Morigami	6	6
Q	(Slovakia) S Hrozenská	2	1
(Uzbekistan) I Tulyaganova	3	6	0
(Australia) A Molik	6	4	0^{r}
WC	(France) C Pin	2	1
9	(United States) L Davenport	6	6

Second round
5	(Belgium) J Henin-Hardenne	6	6
(Russia) A Kournikova	0	1
(France) V Razzano	1	7^{7}	3
32	(Slovenia) K Srebotnik	6	6^{4}	6
24	(Russia) T Panova	3	7	6
WC	(Japan) A Morigami	6	5	4
(Uzbekistan) I Tulyaganova	7^{9}	4	5
9	(United States) L Davenport	6^{7}	6	7

Third round
5	(Belgium) J Henin-Hardenne	6	6
32	(Slovenia) K Srebotnik	2	0
24	(Russia) T Panova	2	1
9	(United States) L Davenport	6	6

Fourth round
5	(Belgium) J Henin-Hardenne	7	5	9
9	(United States) L Davenport	5	7	7

==== Section 6 ====
First round
15	(United States) A Stevenson	6	6
WC	(United Kingdom) E Baltacha	1	4
(Zimbabwe) C Black	3	0
(Czech Republic) D Chládková	6	6
(Germany) B Rittner	5	6	4
WC	(Australia) E Dominikovic	7	4	6
(Czech Republic) L Prusová	2	2
22	(Luxembourg) A Kremer	6	6
30	(Slovakia) J Husárová	6	6
Q	(Argentina) ME Salerni	3	0
(Japan) S Asagoe	2	1
(Spain) V Ruano Pascual	6	6
(France) S Foretz	4	6	6
(Russia) E Kulikovskaya	6	1	0
(Germany) M Weingärtner	2	7^{8}	6
3	(United States) J Capriati	6	6^{6}	4

Second round
15	(United States) A Stevenson	2	2
(Czech Republic) D Chládková	6	6
WC	(Australia) E Dominikovic	6	6
22	(Luxembourg) A Kremer	1	4
30	(Slovakia) J Husárová	7	5	0
(Spain) V Ruano Pascual	5	7	6
(France) S Foretz	6	1	2
(Germany) M Weingärtner	3	6	6

Third round
(Czech Republic) D Chládková	6	6
WC	(Australia) E Dominikovic	3	2
(Spain) V Ruano Pascual	6	4	6
(Germany) M Weingärtner	1	6	4

Fourth round
(Czech Republic) D Chládková	3	3
(Spain) V Ruano Pascual	6	6

==== Section 7 ====
First round
7	(Slovakia) D Hantuchová	7	6^{3}	6
(Colombia) F Zuluaga	5	7^{7}	4
(Russia) E Likhovtseva	6^{6}	4
(Italy) Ad Serra Zanetti	7^{8}	6
Q	(Canada) V Webb	2	7	6
(Spain) M Sánchez Lorenzo	6	5	3
WC	(Australia) S Stosur	6^{3}	6	6
31	(Spain) C Martínez	7^{7}	3	4
21	(Japan) A Sugiyama	6	4	6
(Indonesia) A Widjaja	3	6	2
(Germany) G Arn	2	1
(Russia) N Petrova	6	6
(Spain) M Marrero	7^{9}	6
(Croatia) J Kostanić	6^{7}	1
(Indonesia) W Prakusya	3	1
12	(Switzerland) P Schnyder	6	6

Second round
7	(Slovakia) D Hantuchová	7^{8}	7^{7}
(Italy) Ad Serra Zanetti	6^{6}	6^{3}
Q	(Canada) V Webb	4	1
WC	(Australia) S Stosur	6	6
21	(Japan) A Sugiyama	4	4
(Russia) N Petrova	6	6
(Spain) M Marrero	3	1
12	(Switzerland) P Schnyder	6	6

Third round
7	(Slovakia) D Hantuchová	6	6
WC	(Australia) S Stosur	4	2
(Russia) N Petrova	2	6	3
12	(Switzerland) P Schnyder	6	4	6

Fourth round
7	(Slovakia) D Hantuchová	7	6
12	(Switzerland) P Schnyder	5	3

==== Section 8 ====
First round
13	(Italy) S Farina Elia	6	6
(Italy) F Pennetta	4	2
(United States) M Washington	1	6^{5}
(Australia) N Pratt	6	7^{7}
WC	(Australia) R McQuillan	4	6^{3}
(Italy) T Garbin	6	7^{7}
(Madagascar) D Randriantefy	4	3
23	(Argentina) P Suárez	6	6
27	(United States) L Raymond	7^{7}	6
Q	(United States) L Lee-Waters	6^{3}	3
(Germany) A Barna	5	6	6
(Italy) F Schiavone	7	1	3
PR	(Spain) A Medina Garrigues	1	2
Q	(United States) A Cargill	6	6
(Russia) S Kuznetsova	4	2
2	(United States) V Williams	6	6

Second round
13	(Italy) S Farina Elia	3	2
(Australia) N Pratt	6	6
(Italy) T Garbin	0	0	r
23	(Argentina) P Suárez	6	3
27	(United States) L Raymond	3	1
(Germany) A Barna	6	6
Q	(United States) A Cargill	3	0
2	(United States) V Williams	6	6

Third round
(Australia) N Pratt	7	6
23	(Argentina) P Suárez	5	4
(Germany) A Barna	1	4
2	(United States) V Williams	6	6

Fourth round
(Australia) N Pratt	3	2
2	(United States) V Williams	6	6

== Other entry information ==
=== Wild cards ===
- (United Kingdom) Elena Baltacha
- (Australia) Casey Dellacqua
- (Australia) Evie Dominikovic
- (Australia) Rachel McQuillan
- (Japan) Akiko Morigami
- (France) Camille Pin
- (Australia) Samantha Stosur
- (Australia) Adriana Szili

=== Protected ranking ===
- (Spain) Anabel Medina Garrigues

=== Qualifiers ===
- (United States) Ansley Cargill
- (Hungary) Melinda Czink
- (Slovakia) Eva Fislová
- (Slovakia) Stanislava Hrozenská
- (Federal Republic of Yugoslavia) Jelena Janković
- (Czech Republic) Klára Koukalová
- (United States) Lindsay Lee-Waters
- (Spain) Nuria Llagostera Vives
- (Argentina) María Emilia Salerni
- (Austria) Barbara Schwartz
- (Russia) Maria Sharapova
- (Canada) Vanessa Webb

=== Withdrawals ===
- (Switzerland) Martina Hingis → replaced by (Spain) María Sánchez Lorenzo
- (France) Amélie Mauresmo → replaced by (Russia) Nadia Petrova

Preceded by 2002 US Open – Women's singles	Grand Slam women's singles	Succeeded by 2003 French Open – Women's singles
