= 2003 Australian Open =

- Date: 13–26 January 2003
- Edition: 91st
- Category: Grand Slam (ITF)
- Surface: Hardcourt (Rebound Ace)
- Location: Melbourne, Australia
- Venue: Melbourne Park

Champions

Men's singles
- (United States) Andre Agassi

Women's singles
- (United States) Serena Williams

Men's doubles
- (France) Michaël Llodra / (France) Fabrice Santoro

Women's doubles
- (United States) Serena Williams / (United States) Venus Williams

Mixed doubles
- (United States) Martina Navratilova / (India) Leander Paes

Wheelchair men's singles
- (Australia) David Hall

Wheelchair women's singles
- (Netherlands) Esther Vergeer

Boys' singles
- (Cyprus) Marcos Baghdatis

Girls' singles
- (Czech Republic) Barbora Strýcová

Boys' doubles
- (United States) Scott Oudsema / (United States) Phillip Simmonds

Girls' doubles
- (Australia) Casey Dellacqua / (Australia) Adriana Szili
- Australian Open

The 2003 Australian Open was a tennis tournament held in 2003. It was the first Grand Slam event of the 2003 ATP Tour and the 2003 WTA Tour. It was the 91st edition of the event and attracted 512,225 spectators.

Thomas Johansson could not defend his 2002 title due to an injury which would rule him out for all of 2003. Jennifer Capriati was unsuccessful in her title defence, being defeated in the first round by German Marlene Weingärtner. Andre Agassi won his fourth Australian Open and final Grand Slam title, defeating Rainer Schüttler in a lopsided final. Serena Williams defeated her sister Venus in the final in three sets, to win her fourth consecutive Grand Slam title to hold all four Grand Slam titles at once.

== Seniors ==
=== Men's singles ===
(United States) Andre Agassi defeated (Germany) Rainer Schüttler, 6–2, 6–2, 6–1

- It was Agassi's 8th (and last) career Grand Slam title, and his 4th Australian Open title (an Open Era record until it was broken by Novak Djokovic in 2015).

=== Women's singles ===
(United States) Serena Williams defeated (United States) Venus Williams, 7–6^{(7–4)}, 3–6, 6–4

- It was Serena's 5th career Grand Slam title, her 4th in a row, and her 1st Australian Open title. this also marks Serena claiming a Career Grand Slam and first of two Serena Slams.

=== Men's doubles ===
(France) Michaël Llodra / (France) Fabrice Santoro defeated (The Bahamas) Mark Knowles / (Canada) Daniel Nestor, 6–4, 3–6, 6–3

=== Women's doubles ===
(United States) Serena Williams / (United States) Venus Williams defeated (Spain) Virginia Ruano Pascual / (Argentina) Paola Suárez, 4–6, 6–4, 6–3

=== Mixed doubles ===
(United States) Martina Navratilova / (India) Leander Paes defeated (Greece) Eleni Daniilidou / (Australia) Todd Woodbridge, 6–4, 7–5

== Juniors ==
=== Boys' singles ===
(Cyprus) Marcos Baghdatis def. (Romania) Florin Mergea, 6–4, 6–4

=== Girls' singles ===
(Czech Republic) Barbora Strýcová defeated (Ukraine) Viktoriya Kutuzova, 0–6, 6–2, 6–2

=== Boys' doubles ===
(United States) Scott Oudsema / (United States) Phillip Simmonds defeated (Romania) Florin Mergea / (Romania) Horia Tecău, 6–4, 6–4

=== Girls' doubles ===
(Australia) Casey Dellacqua / (Australia) Adriana Szili defeated (Czech Republic) Petra Cetkovská / (Czech Republic) Barbora Strýcová, 6–3, 4–4, ret.

== Wheelchair ==
=== Men's wheelchair singles ===
(Australia) David Hall defeated (Netherlands) Robin Ammerlaan, 6–1, 7-6

=== Women's wheelchair singles ===
(Netherlands) Esther Vergeer defeated (Australia) Daniela Di Toro, 2–6, 6–0, 6-3

== Seeds ==
Withdrawn players: (United Kingdom) Tim Henman, (Germany) Tommy Haas, (Sweden) Thomas Johansson, (Chile) Marcelo Ríos, (United Kingdom) Greg Rusedski, (France) Paul-Henri Mathieu, (France) Arnaud Clément; (Switzerland) Martina Hingis, (France) Amélie Mauresmo, (Federal Republic of Yugoslavia) Jelena Dokic.

=== Men's singles ===
1. (Australia) Lleyton Hewitt (fourth round, lost to Younes El Aynaoui)
2. (United States) Andre Agassi (champion)
3. (Russia) Marat Safin (third round, withdrew before match against Rainer Schüttler)
4. (Spain) Juan Carlos Ferrero (quarterfinals, lost to Wayne Ferreira)
5. (Spain) Carlos Moyá (second round, lost to Mardy Fish)
6. (Switzerland) Roger Federer (fourth round, lost to David Nalbandian)
7. (Czech Republic) Jiří Novák (third round, lost to Mikhail Youzhny)
8. (Spain) Albert Costa (third round, lost to Félix Mantilla)
9. (United States) Andy Roddick (semifinals, lost to Rainer Schüttler)
10. (Argentina) David Nalbandian (quarterfinals, lost to Rainer Schüttler)
11. (Thailand) Paradorn Srichaphan (second round, lost to Mark Philippoussis)
12. (France) Sébastien Grosjean (quarterfinals, lost to Andre Agassi)
13. (Chile) Fernando González (second round, lost to Alberto Martín)
14. (Argentina) Guillermo Cañas (second round, lost to Guillermo Coria)
15. (Spain) Àlex Corretja (first round, lost to Feliciano López)
16. (Netherlands) Sjeng Schalken (second round, lost to Mario Ančić)
17. (Argentina) Gastón Gaudio (second round, lost to Sargis Sargsian)
18. (Morocco) Younes El Aynaoui (quarterfinals, lost to Andy Roddick)
19. (Argentina) Juan Ignacio Chela (second round, lost to Fernando Vicente)
20. (Belgium) Xavier Malisse (third round, lost to David Nalbandian)
21. (Romania) Andrei Pavel (first round, lost to Renzo Furlan, retired)
22. (Russia) Yevgeny Kafelnikov (second round, lost to Jarkko Nieminen)
23. (United States) James Blake (fourth round, lost to Rainer Schüttler)
24. (Ecuador) Nicolás Lapentti (third round, lost to Sébastien Grosjean)
25. (Russia) Mikhail Youzhny (fourth round, lost to Andy Roddick)
26. (Spain) Tommy Robredo (first round, lost to Wayne Ferreira)
27. (United States) Jan-Michael Gambill (second round, lost to Félix Mantilla)
28. (France) Fabrice Santoro (third round, lost to Juan Carlos Ferrero)
29. (France) Nicolas Escudé (third round, lost to Andre Agassi)
30. (Brazil) Gustavo Kuerten (second round, lost to Radek Štěpánek)
31. (Germany) Rainer Schüttler (final, lost to Andre Agassi)
32. (Austria) Stefan Koubek (first round, lost to Andreas Vinciguerra)

=== Women's singles ===
1. (United States) Serena Williams (champion)
2. (United States) Venus Williams (final, lost to Serena Williams)
3. (United States) Jennifer Capriati (first round, lost to Marlene Weingärtner)
4. (Belgium) Kim Clijsters (semifinals, lost to Serena Williams)
5. (Belgium) Justine Henin-Hardenne (semifinals, lost to Venus Williams)
6. (United States) Monica Seles (second round, lost to Klára Koukalová)
7. (Slovakia) Daniela Hantuchová (quarterfinals, lost to Serena Williams)
8. (Russia) Anastasia Myskina (quarterfinals, lost to Kim Clijsters)
9. (United States) Lindsay Davenport (fourth round, lost to Justine Henin-Hardenne)
10. (United States) Chanda Rubin (fourth round, lost to Anastasia Myskina)
11. (Bulgaria) Magdalena Maleeva (third round, lost to Elena Bovina)
12. (Switzerland) Patty Schnyder (fourth round, lost to Daniela Hantuchová)
13. (Italy) Silvia Farina Elia (second round, lost to Nicole Pratt)
14. (Israel) Anna Smashnova (third round, lost to Amanda Coetzer)
15. (United States) Alexandra Stevenson (second round, lost to Denisa Chládková)
16. (France) Nathalie Dechy (third round, lost to Eleni Daniilidou)
17. (Russia) Elena Dementieva (first round, lost to Barbara Schwartz)
18. (Greece) Eleni Daniilidou (fourth round, lost to Serena Williams)
19. (South Africa) Amanda Coetzer (fourth round, lost to Kim Clijsters)
20. (Russia) Elena Bovina (fourth round, lost to Meghann Shaughnessy)
21. (Japan) Ai Sugiyama (second round, lost to Nadia Petrova)
22. (Luxembourg) Anne Kremer (second round, lost to Evie Dominikovic)
23. (Argentina) Paola Suárez (third round, lost to Nicole Pratt)
24. (Russia) Tatiana Panova (third round, lost to Lindsay Davenport)
25. (United States) Meghann Shaughnessy (quarterfinals, lost to Serena Williams)
26. (Thailand) Tamarine Tanasugarn (third round, lost to Serena Williams)
27. (United States) Lisa Raymond (second round, lost to Anca Barna)
28. (Argentina) Clarisa Fernández (third round, lost to Anastasia Myskina)
29. (Croatia) Iva Majoli (first round, lost to Cristina Torrens Valero)
30. (Slovakia) Janette Husárová (second round, lost to Virginia Ruano Pascual)
31. (Spain) Conchita Martínez (first round, lost to Amy Frazier)
32. (Slovenia) Katarina Srebotnik (third round, lost to Justine Henin-Hardenne)

Preceded by 2002 US Open	Grand Slams	Succeeded by 2003 French Open
