= 1999 Eurotel Slovak Indoor – Singles =

Singles
- 1999 Eurotel Slovak Open

Final
- Champion: (France) Amélie Mauresmo
- Runner-up: (Belgium) Kim Clijsters
- Score: 6–3, 6–3

Events
Singles	Doubles
Eurotel Slovak Open	· 2000 →

The 1999 Eurotel Slovak Open singles was the tennis singles event of the first edition of the most prestigious tournament in Slovakia. In a final of two future World No. 1s, Amélie Mauresmo defeated Kim Clijsters in straight sets, 6–3, 6–3.

== Seeds ==
1. (France) Amélie Mauresmo (champion)
2. (France) Nathalie Dechy (semifinals)
3. (Slovakia) Henrieta Nagyová (first round)
4. (Belgium) Sabine Appelmans (quarterfinals)
5. (United States) Corina Morariu (first round)
6. (Slovakia) Karina Habšudová (quarterfinals)
7. (Austria) Barbara Schwartz (quarterfinals)
8. (Belgium) Kim Clijsters (final)

== Draw ==
=== Key ===
- Q = Qualifier
- WC = Wild card
- LL = Lucky loser
- Alt = Alternate
- SE = Special exempt
- PR = Protected ranking
- ITF = ITF entry
- JE = Junior exempt
- w/o = Walkover
- r = Retired
- d = Defaulted
- SR = Special ranking

=== Finals ===
Semifinals
1	(France) Amélie Mauresmo	w/o
(Czech Republic) Květa Hrdličková
8	(Belgium) Kim Clijsters	6^{7}	6	6
2	(France) Nathalie Dechy	7^{9}	4	2

Final
1	(France) Amélie Mauresmo	6	6
8	(Belgium) Kim Clijsters	3	3

=== Top half ===
First round
1	(France) A Mauresmo	3	6	7^{9}
(Hungary) R Kuti-Kis	6	3	6^{7}
(Netherlands) M Oremans	3	5
(Germany) B Rittner	6	7
(Czech Republic) A Gerši	7^{7}	7
(South Africa) J Kruger	6^{5}	5
Q	(Czech Republic) R Kučerová	2	3
7	(Austria) B Schwartz	6	6
3	(Slovakia) H Nagyová	4	0
(Czech Republic) K Hrdličková	6	6
Q	(Czech Republic) R Pelikánová	2	1
(Zimbabwe) C Black	6	6
(Italy) R Grande	3	2
(France) A Cocheteux	6	6
WC	(Slovakia) Ľ Cervanová	6^{4}	4
6	(Slovakia) K Habšudová	7^{7}	6

Second round
1	(France) A Mauresmo	3	6	6
(Germany) B Rittner	6	4	4
(Czech Republic) A Gerši	2	2
7	(Austria) B Schwartz	6	6
(Czech Republic) K Hrdličková	6	6
(Zimbabwe) C Black	1	4
(France) A Cocheteux	5	3
6	(Slovakia) K Habšudová	7	6

Quarterfinals
1	(France) A Mauresmo	7	6
7	(Austria) B Schwartz	5	2
(Czech Republic) K Hrdličková	6	6
6	(Slovakia) K Habšudová	2	1

Semifinals
1	(France) A Mauresmo	w/o
(Czech Republic) K Hrdličková

=== Bottom half ===
First round
8	(Belgium) K Clijsters	6	6
(United States) T Snyder	1	3
Q	(Czech Republic) S Kleinová	6	7^{7}
(Uzbekistan) I Tulyaganova	4	6^{5}
Q	(Hungary) K Marosi	0	6	1
(Czech Republic) D Chládková	6	3	6
WC	(Slovakia) D Hantuchová	4	4
4	(Belgium) S Appelmans	6	6
5	(United States) C Morariu	5	6	1
(Bulgaria) L Bacheva	7	4	6
(Poland) M Grzybowska	6	3	4
(Belarus) O Barabanschikova	4	6	6
(Slovenia) K Srebotnik	3	3
(United States) L Osterloh	6	6
(Belgium) L Courtois	3	4
2	(France) N Dechy	6	6

Second round
8	(Belgium) K Clijsters	7	3
Q	(Czech Republic) S Kleinová	5	1	r
(Czech Republic) D Chládková	1	7	2
4	(Belgium) S Appelmans	6	5	6
(Bulgaria) L Bacheva	5	4
(Belarus) O Barabanschikova	7	6
(United States) L Osterloh	0	2
2	(France) N Dechy	6	6

Quarterfinals
8	(Belgium) K Clijsters	6	6
4	(Belgium) S Appelmans	2	1
(Belarus) O Barabanschikova	3	4
2	(France) N Dechy	6	6

Semifinals
8	(Belgium) K Clijsters	6^{7}	6	6
2	(France) N Dechy	7^{9}	4	2

== Qualifying ==
=== Seeds ===
1. (Czech Republic) Sandra Kleinová (Qualifier)
2. (Poland) Anna Żarska (first round)
3. (Germany) Anca Barna (qualifying competition)
4. (Hungary) Katalin Marosi (Qualifier)
5. (Bulgaria) Desislava Topalova (qualifying competition)
6. (Czech Republic) Renata Kučerová (Qualifier)
7. (Czech Republic) Alena Vašková (first round)
8. (Germany) Adriana Barna (first round)

=== Qualifiers ===
1. (Czech Republic) Sandra Kleinová
2. (Hungary) Katalin Marosi
3. (Czech Republic) Renata Kučerová
4. (Czech Republic) Radka Pelikánová

== Qualifying draw ==
=== Key ===
- Q = Qualifier
- WC = Wild card
- LL = Lucky loser
- Alt = Alternate
- SE = Special exempt
- PR = Protected ranking
- ITF = ITF entry
- JE = Junior exempt
- w/o = Walkover
- r = Retired
- d = Defaulted
- SR = Special ranking

=== First qualifier ===
First round
1	(Czech Republic) Sandra Kleinová	6	6
(Slovakia) Eva Fislová	1	0
(Slovakia) Natalia Drábová	3	0
(Czech Republic) Gabriela Navrátilová	6	6
(Slovakia) Andrea Masaryková	1	5
(Slovakia) Barbora Blahutiaková	6	7
(Slovakia) Andrea Šebová	2	1
5	(Bulgaria) Desislava Topalova	6	6

Second round
1	(Czech Republic) Sandra Kleinová	6	6
(Czech Republic) Gabriela Navrátilová	2	1
(Slovakia) Barbora Blahutiaková	1	0
5	(Bulgaria) Desislava Topalova	6	6

Qualifying competition
1	(Czech Republic) Sandra Kleinová	7^{7}	6
5	(Bulgaria) Desislava Topalova	6^{1}	3

=== Second qualifier ===
First round
4	(Hungary) Katalin Marosi	6	6
(Poland) Agata Kurowska	1	2
(Germany) Stephanie Gehrlein	1	3
WC	(Slovakia) Zuzana Kučová	6	6
(Germany) Catherine Turinsky	3	1
WC	(Hungary) Zsófia Gubacsi	6	6
(Austria) Karin Kschwendt	3	6	6
8	(Germany) Adriana Barna	6	3	3

Second round
4	(Hungary) Katalin Marosi	6	6
WC	(Slovakia) Zuzana Kučová	2	1
WC	(Hungary) Zsófia Gubacsi	6	6
(Austria) Karin Kschwendt	3	1

Qualifying competition
4	(Hungary) Katalin Marosi	6	6
(Hungary) Zsófia Gubacsi	2	1

=== Third qualifier ===
First round
6	(Czech Republic) Renata Kučerová	6	6
(Germany) Fruzsina Siklosi	3	4
(Slovakia) Radka Zrubáková	6	6
(Czech Republic) Petra Kučová	4	2
(Czech Republic) Zuzana Hejdová	6	6
(Czech Republic) Olga Vymetálková	4	3
(Czech Republic) Eva Martincová	2	2
3	(Germany) Anca Barna	6	6

Second round
6	(Czech Republic) Renata Kučerová	6	7^{7}
(Slovakia) Radka Zrubáková	1	6^{2}
(Czech Republic) Zuzana Hejdová	6	6
3	(Germany) Anca Barna	3	1

Qualifying competition
6	(Czech Republic) Renata Kučerová	6	3	7^{7}
3	(Germany) Anca Barna	3	6	6^{2}

=== Fourth qualifier ===
First round
7	(Czech Republic) Alena Vašková	4	6	5
WC	(Slovakia) Stanislava Hrozenská	6	2	7
(Czech Republic) Ludmila Richterová	2	6	7^{7}
(Slovakia) Gabriela Voleková	6	3	6^{3}
(Czech Republic) Blanka Kumbárová	3	2
(Belgium) Stephanie Devillé	6	6
(Czech Republic) Radka Pelikánová	7	6
2	(Poland) Anna Żarska	6	4

Second round
WC	(Slovakia) Stanislava Hrozenská	6	6
(Czech Republic) Ludmila Richterová	2	1
(Belgium) Stephanie Devillé	2	1
(Czech Republic) Radka Pelikánová	6	6

Qualifying competition
WC	(Slovakia) Stanislava Hrozenská	3	3
(Czech Republic) Radka Pelikánová	6	6
