= 2001 EuroTel Slovak Indoors – Singles =

Singles
- 2001 EuroTel Slovak Indoors

Final
- Champion: (Italy) Rita Grande
- Runner-up: (Slovakia) Martina Suchá
- Score: 6–1, 6–1

Details
- Draw: 32 (2WC/4Q/1LL)
- Seeds: 8

Events
Singles	Doubles
← 2000 ·	WTA Bratislava	· 2002 →

Dája Bedáňová was the defending champion, but lost in the first round to Lilia Osterloh.

Rita Grande won the title by defeating Martina Suchá 6–1, 6–1 in the final.

== Seeds ==
1. (Czech Republic) Dája Bedáňová (first round)
2. (Luxembourg) Anne Kremer (quarterfinals)
3. (Italy) Francesca Schiavone (second round)
4. (Italy) Rita Grande (champion)
5. (Czech Republic) Denisa Chládková (second round)
6. (United States) Meilen Tu (second round)
7. (France) Nathalie Dechy (second round)
8. (Russia) Elena Bovina (first round)

== Draw ==
=== Key ===
- Q = Qualifier
- WC = Wild card
- LL = Lucky loser
- Alt = Alternate
- SE = Special exempt
- PR = Protected ranking
- ITF = ITF entry
- JE = Junior exempt
- w/o = Walkover
- r = Retired
- d = Defaulted
- SR = Special ranking

=== Finals ===
Semifinals
Q	(Italy) Adriana Serra Zanetti	7	1	1
Q	(Slovakia) Martina Suchá	5	6	6
4	(Italy) Rita Grande	6	6
(Slovakia) Ľudmila Cervanová	3	2

Final
Q	(Slovakia) Martina Suchá	1	1
4	(Italy) Rita Grande	6	6

=== Top half ===
First round
1	(Czech Republic) D Bedáňová	3	3
(United States) L Osterloh	6	6
(Spain) M Marrero	6	6
(Czech Republic) Z Ondrášková	3	2
Q	(Slovakia) Ľ Kurhajcová	2	6^{4}
Q	(Italy) Ad Serra Zanetti	6	7^{7}
(Greece) E Daniilidou	6	2	6
8	(Russia) E Bovina	1	6	2
3	(Italy) F Schiavone	7	6
(Hungary) P Mandula	5	2
(Belarus) T Poutchek	4	2
(Czech Republic) K Hrdličková	6	6
Q	(Slovakia) M Suchá	6	6
LL	(Hungary) Z Gubacsi	2	0
(Switzerland) M Vavrinec	4	2
5	(Czech Republic) D Chládková	6	6

Second round
(United States) L Osterloh	6^{4}	6	6
(Spain) M Marrero	7^{7}	4	2
Q	(Italy) Ad Serra Zanetti	6	3	6
(Greece) E Daniilidou	2	6	4
3	(Italy) F Schiavone	6	3	4
(Czech Republic) K Hrdličková	4	6	6
Q	(Slovakia) M Suchá	6	4	6
5	(Czech Republic) D Chládková	2	6	3

Quarterfinals
(United States) L Osterloh	2	6	4
Q	(Italy) Ad Serra Zanetti	6	4	6
(Czech Republic) K Hrdličková	5	6	3
Q	(Slovakia) M Suchá	7	4	6

Semifinals
Q	(Italy) Ad Serra Zanetti	7	1	1
Q	(Slovakia) M Suchá	5	6	6

=== Bottom half ===
First round
7	(France) N Dechy	6	6
(Czech Republic) A Gerši	2	3
(Hungary) R Kuti-Kis	3	2
(Germany) B Lamade	6	6
(United States) J Hopkins	6	6
WC	(Slovakia) L Dlhopolcová	4	5
(Spain) A Medina Garrigues	0	1
4	(Italy) R Grande	6	6
6	(United States) M Tu	6	6^{6}	6
(Zimbabwe) C Black	4	7^{8}	1
(Slovakia) Ľ Cervanová	6	6
(Germany) A Glass	3	1
WC	(Slovakia) S Hrozenská	0	6	6
Q	(Germany) G Arn	6	3	3
(France) C Beigbeder	5	5
2	(Luxembourg) A Kremer	7	7

Second round
7	(France) N Dechy	3	4
(Germany) B Lamade	6	6
(United States) J Hopkins	4	2
4	(Italy) R Grande	6	6
6	(United States) M Tu	4	3
(Slovakia) Ľ Cervanová	6	6
WC	(Slovakia) S Hrozenská	1	3
2	(Luxembourg) A Kremer	6	6

Quarterfinals
(Germany) B Lamade	7	4	6^{5}
4	(Italy) R Grande	5	6	7^{7}
(Slovakia) Ľ Cervanová	6	6
2	(Luxembourg) A Kremer	2	2

Semifinals
4	(Italy) R Grande	6	6
(Slovakia) Ľ Cervanová	3	2
