= 1999 Eurotel Slovak Indoor – Doubles =

Doubles
- 1999 Eurotel Slovak Open

Final
- Champions: (Belgium) Kim Clijsters (Belgium) Laurence Courtois
- Runners-up: (Belarus) Olga Barabanschikova (United States) Lilia Osterloh
- Score: 6–2, 3–6, 7–5

Events
Singles	Doubles
Eurotel Slovak Open	· 2000 →

The 1999 Eurotel Slovak Open doubles was the tennis doubles event of the first edition of the most prestigious tournament in Slovakia. Belgian team Kim Clijsters and Laurence Courtois won the title, defeating Olga Barabanschikova and Lilia Osterloh in the final.

== Seeds ==
1. (Zimbabwe) Cara Black / (Slovenia) Katarina Srebotnik (quarterfinals)
2. (Czech Republic) Květa Hrdličková / (Germany) Barbara Rittner (first round)
3. (Italy) Rita Grande / (Slovakia) Karina Habšudová (semifinals)
4. (Hungary) Katalin Marosi / (Austria) Barbara Schwartz (quarterfinals)

== Draw ==
=== Key ===
- Q = Qualifier
- WC = Wild card
- LL = Lucky loser
- Alt = Alternate
- SE = Special exempt
- PR = Protected ranking
- ITF = ITF entry
- JE = Junior exempt
- w/o = Walkover
- r = Retired
- d = Defaulted
- SR = Special ranking

First round
1	(Zimbabwe) C Black (Slovenia) K Srebotnik	6	6
(Czech Republic) M Maštalířová (Czech Republic) L Richterová	2	4
Q	(Slovakia) S Hrozenská (Slovakia) A Šebová	1	6	3
(Belarus) O Barabanschikova (United States) L Osterloh	6	3	6
3	(Italy) R Grande (Slovakia) K Habšudová	6	6
(Czech Republic) E Martincová (Czech Republic) H Vildová	1	3
(Czech Republic) O Blahotová (Czech Republic) G Navrátilová	2	1
(Germany) Ad Barna (Germany) An Barna	6	6
(Belgium) K Clijsters (Belgium) L Courtois	6	7
(Slovakia) A Paulenková (Slovakia) R Zrubáková	1	5
(Czech Republic) R Pelikánová (Czech Republic) M Zděnovcová	4	4
4	(Hungary) K Marosi (Austria) B Schwartz	6	6
(France) N Dechy (Slovakia) H Nagyová	6	7
(Poland) M Grzybowska (South Africa) J Kruger	2	5
WC	(Slovakia) Ľ Cervanová (Slovakia) D Hantuchová	6	6
2	(Czech Republic) K Hrdličková (Germany) B Rittner	2	3

Quarterfinals
1	(Zimbabwe) C Black (Slovenia) K Srebotnik	6	1	4
(Belarus) O Barabanschikova (United States) L Osterloh	3	6	6
3	(Italy) R Grande (Slovakia) K Habšudová	7^{7}	6
(Germany) Ad Barna (Germany) An Barna	6^{3}	4
(Belgium) K Clijsters (Belgium) L Courtois	6	6
4	(Hungary) K Marosi (Austria) B Schwartz	1	4
(France) N Dechy (Slovakia) H Nagyová	7	3	6
WC	(Slovakia) Ľ Cervanová (Slovakia) D Hantuchová	5	6	3

Semifinals
(Belarus) O Barabanschikova (United States) L Osterloh	7	6
3	(Italy) R Grande (Slovakia) K Habšudová	5	3
(Belgium) K Clijsters (Belgium) L Courtois	w/o
(France) N Dechy (Slovakia) H Nagyová

Final
(Belarus) O Barabanschikova (United States) L Osterloh	2	6	5
(Belgium) K Clijsters (Belgium) L Courtois	6	3	7

== Qualifying ==
=== Seeds ===
1. (Bulgaria) Lubomira Bacheva / (Austria) Karin Kschwendt (qualifying competition)
2. (Hungary) Zsófia Gubacsi / (Slovakia) Gabriela Voleková (first round)

=== Qualifiers ===
1. (Slovakia) Stanislava Hrozenská / (Slovakia) Andrea Šebová

== Qualifying draw ==
=== Key ===
- Q = Qualifier
- WC = Wild card
- LL = Lucky loser
- Alt = Alternate
- SE = Special exempt
- PR = Protected ranking
- ITF = ITF entry
- JE = Junior exempt
- w/o = Walkover
- r = Retired
- d = Defaulted
- SR = Special ranking

First round
1	(Bulgaria) Lubomira Bacheva (Austria) Karin Kschwendt	8
(Slovakia) Barbora Blahutiaková (Slovakia) Zuzana Kučová	3
(Slovakia) Stanislava Hrozenská (Slovakia) Andrea Šebová	8
2	(Hungary) Zsófia Gubacsi (Slovakia) Gabriela Voleková	6

Qualifying competition
1	(Bulgaria) Lubomira Bacheva (Austria) Karin Kschwendt	5
(Slovakia) Stanislava Hrozenská (Slovakia) Andrea Šebová	8
