= 2000 EuroTel Slovak Indoor – Doubles =

Doubles
- 2000 EuroTel Slovak Indoor

Final
- Champions: (Slovakia) Karina Habšudová (Slovakia) Daniela Hantuchová
- Runners-up: (Hungary) Petra Mandula (Austria) Patricia Wartusch
- Score: Walkover

Details
- Draw: 16 (1WC/1Q/1LL)
- Seeds: 4

Events
Singles	Doubles
- WTA Bratislava

Kim Clijsters and Laurence Courtois were the defending champions, but neither competed this year.

Karina Habšudová and Daniela Hantuchová won the title, after Petra Mandula and Patricia Wartusch were forced to withdraw before the final.

== Seeds ==
1. (Netherlands) Kristie Boogert / (Netherlands) Miriam Oremans (semifinals)
2. (n/a)
3. (Hungary) Petra Mandula / (Austria) Patricia Wartusch (final, withdrew)
4. (Bulgaria) Lubomira Bacheva / (Spain) Cristina Torrens Valero (quarterfinals)

== Draw ==
Key

- Q = Qualifier
- WC = Wild card
- LL = Lucky loser
- Alt = Alternate
- ITF = ITF entry
- PR = Protected ranking
- SR = Special ranking
- SE = Special exempt
- JE = Junior exempt
- JR = Junior Accelerator Programme entrant
- CO = College Accelerator Programme entrant
- NG = Next Gen Accelerator Program entrant
- w/o = Walkover
- r = Retired
- d = Defaulted

=== Draw ===
First round
1	(Netherlands) K Boogert (Netherlands) M Oremans	6	6
(Czech Republic) E Martincová (Czech Republic) A Vašková	4	1
(Czech Republic) R Bobková (Czech Republic) K Šišková	6	7^{7}
(Germany) M Kučerová (Croatia) M Palaveršić	1	6^{5}
3	(Hungary) P Mandula (Austria) P Wartusch	4	6	7
Q	(Slovakia) A Paulenková (Slovakia) M Suchá	6	3	5
WC	(Slovakia) Ľ Kurhajcová (Slovakia) E Fislová	6	6
(Belarus) O Barabanschikova (Federal Republic of Yugoslavia) V Vuletić	1	1
(Czech Republic) O Blahotová (Czech Republic) G Navrátilová	1	1
(Slovakia) K Habšudová (Slovakia) D Hantuchová	6	6
(Czech Republic) M Paštiková (Germany) J Wöhr	2	r
4	(Bulgaria) L Bacheva (Spain) C Torrens Valero	6
(Slovenia) M Matevžič (Germany) S Schmidle	6^{2}	3
(Luxembourg) A Kremer (Germany) C Schneider	7^{7}	6
(Slovakia) H Nagyová (Austria) S Plischke	6	6
LL	(Slovakia) L Dlhopolcová (Slovakia) S Hrozenská	4	2

Quarterfinals
1	(Netherlands) K Boogert (Netherlands) M Oremans	6	6
(Czech Republic) R Bobková (Czech Republic) K Šišková	3	4
3	(Hungary) P Mandula (Austria) P Wartusch	6	6
WC	(Slovakia) Ľ Kurhajcová (Slovakia) E Fislová	4	4
(Slovakia) K Habšudová (Slovakia) D Hantuchová	4	7^{7}	6
4	(Bulgaria) L Bacheva (Spain) C Torrens Valero	6	6^{5}	3
(Luxembourg) A Kremer (Germany) C Schneider	6	5	5
(Slovakia) H Nagyová (Austria) S Plischke	4	7	7

Semifinals
1	(Netherlands) K Boogert (Netherlands) M Oremans	3	4
3	(Hungary) P Mandula (Austria) P Wartusch	6	6
(Slovakia) K Habšudová (Slovakia) D Hantuchová	7^{7}	6
(Slovakia) H Nagyová (Austria) S Plischke	6^{4}	4

Final
3	(Hungary) P Mandula (Austria) P Wartusch
(Slovakia) K Habšudová (Slovakia) D Hantuchová	w/o
