= 2000 EuroTel Slovak Indoor – Singles =

Singles
- 2000 EuroTel Slovak Indoor

Final
- Champion: (Czech Republic) Dája Bedáňová
- Runner-up: (Netherlands) Miriam Oremans
- Score: 6–1, 5–7, 6–3

Details
- Draw: 32 (2WC/4Q/3LL)
- Seeds: 8

Events
Singles	Doubles
← 1999 ·	WTA Bratislava	· 2001 →

Amélie Mauresmo was the defending champion, but did not compete this year.

Dája Bedáňová won the title by defeating Miriam Oremans 6–1, 5–7, 6–3 in the final.

== Seeds ==
1. (France) Anne-Gaëlle Sidot (quarterfinals)
2. (Luxembourg) Anne Kremer (second round)
3. (Belgium) Justine Henin (quarterfinals)
4. (Czech Republic) Denisa Chládková (semifinals)
5. (Austria) Sylvia Plischke (quarterfinals)
6. (Czech Republic) Dája Bedáňová (champion)
7. (n/a)
8. (Belarus) Olga Barabanschikova (second round)
9. (Czech Republic) Adriana Gerši (second round)

== Draw ==
=== Key ===
- Q = Qualifier
- WC = Wild card
- LL = Lucky loser
- Alt = Alternate
- SE = Special exempt
- PR = Protected ranking
- ITF = ITF entry
- JE = Junior exempt
- w/o = Walkover
- r = Retired
- d = Defaulted
- SR = Special ranking

=== Finals ===
Semifinals
(Netherlands) Miriam Oremans	6	6
4	(Czech Republic) Denisa Chládková	2	0
6/WC	(Czech Republic) Dája Bedáňová	2	6	6
(Slovakia) Karina Habšudová	6	4	4

Final
(Netherlands) Miriam Oremans	1	7	3
6/WC	(Czech Republic) Dája Bedáňová	6	5	6

=== Top half ===
First round
1	(France) AG Sidot	6	6
(Switzerland) E Gagliardi	3	4
(Spain) C Torrens Valero	6	6
(Netherlands) K Boogert	4	1
(Greece) M Babel	0	0
(Netherlands) M Oremans	6	6
(Bulgaria) L Bacheva	3	1
9	(Czech Republic) A Gerši	6	6
4	(Czech Republic) D Chládková	7	6
(Czech Republic) R Bobková	5	3
(Slovenia) K Srebotnik	6	6
LL	(Germany) N Dübbers	3	3
(Hungary) P Mandula	4	5
LL	(Slovakia) S Hrozenská	6	7
Q	(Croatia) I Majoli	2	6	4
5	(Austria) S Plischke	6	3	6

Second round
1	(France) AG Sidot	6	3	6
(Spain) C Torrens Valero	3	6	2
(Netherlands) M Oremans	2	6	6
9	(Czech Republic) A Gerši	6	4	2
4	(Czech Republic) D Chládková	6	6
(Slovenia) K Srebotnik	4	3
LL	(Slovakia) S Hrozenská	3	2
5	(Austria) S Plischke	6	6

Quarterfinals
1	(France) AG Sidot	6	6^{2}	6^{6}
(Netherlands) M Oremans	4	7^{7}	7^{8}
4	(Czech Republic) D Chládková	7^{7}	6
5	(Austria) S Plischke	6^{2}	3

Semifinals
(Netherlands) M Oremans	6	6
4	(Czech Republic) D Chládková	2	0

=== Bottom half ===
First round
6/WC	(Czech Republic) D Bedáňová	6	6
Q	(Czech Republic) A Vašková	3	3
Q	(United Kingdom) H Collin	2	3
(Belgium) E Callens	6	6
(Czech Republic) S Kleinová	4	1
Q	(Slovakia) M Suchá	6	6
LL	(Czech Republic) M Kučerová	1	5
3	(Belgium) J Henin	6	7
8	(Belarus) O Barabanschikova	5
(Italy) G Casoni	0^{r}
(Austria) P Wartusch	4	4
(Slovakia) H Nagyová	6	6
(Slovakia) K Habšudová	6	6
(France) É Loit	1	1
WC	(Slovakia) D Hantuchová	6	3	3
2	(Luxembourg) A Kremer	3	6	6

Second round
6/WC	(Czech Republic) D Bedáňová	6	7^{7}
(Belgium) E Callens	1	6^{4}
Q	(Slovakia) M Suchá	1	4
3	(Belgium) J Henin	6	6
8	(Belarus) O Barabanschikova	1	6^{1}
(Slovakia) H Nagyová	6	7^{7}
(Slovakia) K Habšudová	3	7	6
2	(Luxembourg) A Kremer	6	5	4

Quarterfinals
6/WC	(Czech Republic) D Bedáňová	6	5	6
3	(Belgium) J Henin	3	7	4
(Slovakia) H Nagyová	4	6	3
(Slovakia) K Habšudová	6	0	6

Semifinals
6/WC	(Czech Republic) D Bedáňová	2	6	6
(Slovakia) K Habšudová	6	4	4
