= 2001 EuroTel Slovak Indoors – Doubles =

Doubles
- 2001 EuroTel Slovak Indoors

Final
- Champions: (Czech Republic) Dája Bedáňová (Russia) Elena Bovina
- Runners-up: (France) Nathalie Dechy (United States) Meilen Tu
- Score: 6–3, 6–4

Events
Singles	Doubles
← 2000 ·	WTA Bratislava	· 2002 →

Karina Habšudová and Daniela Hantuchová were the defending champions but chose to compete at Zürich during the same week, with different partners.

Dája Bedáňová and Elena Bovina won the title by defeating Nathalie Dechy and Meilen Tu 6–3, 6–4 in the final.

== Seeds ==
1. (Slovenia) Tina Križan / (Slovenia) Katarina Srebotnik (quarterfinals)
2. (France) Alexandra Fusai / (Italy) Rita Grande (semifinals)
3. (Germany) ~~Barbara Rittner~~ / (Czech Republic) ~~Květa Hrdličková~~ (withdrew)
4. (Hungary) Petra Mandula / (Austria) Patricia Wartusch (first round)
5. (France) Nathalie Dechy / (United States) Meilen Tu (final)

== Draw ==
=== Key ===
- Q = Qualifier
- WC = Wild card
- LL = Lucky loser
- Alt = Alternate
- SE = Special exempt
- PR = Protected ranking
- ITF = ITF entry
- JE = Junior exempt
- w/o = Walkover
- r = Retired
- d = Defaulted
- SR = Special ranking

=== Draw ===
First round
1	(Slovenia) T Križan (Slovenia) K Srebotnik	6	6
(United States) S Reeves (Italy) Ad Serra Zanetti	4	2
Q	(Slovakia) E Fislová (Slovakia) S Hrozenská	6^{4}	6^{3}
(Russia) A Rodionova (Germany) C Schneider	7^{7}	7^{7}
5	(France) N Dechy (United States) M Tu	6	6
(Belarus) T Poutchek (Italy) An Serra Zanetti	3	4
(Luxembourg) A Kremer (Germany) B Lamade	4	6^{2}
(Czech Republic) E Martincová (Italy) F Schiavone	6	7^{7}
WC	(Slovakia) L Dlhopolcová (Slovakia) Ľ Kurhajcová	2	1
(Spain) M Marrero (Spain) A Medina Garrigues	6	6
(Czech Republic) D Bedáňová (Russia) E Bovina	6	6
4	(Hungary) P Mandula (Austria) P Wartusch	3	2
(Germany) A Glass (United States) L Osterloh	2	7	4
(Croatia) M Palaveršić (Venezuela) M Vento-Kabchi	6	5	6
LL	(Hungary) Z Gubacsi (United States) J Hopkins	1	1
2	(France) A Fusai (Italy) R Grande	6	6

Quarterfinals
1	(Slovenia) T Križan (Slovenia) K Srebotnik	6^{5}	4
(Russia) A Rodionova (Germany) C Schneider	7^{7}	6
5	(France) N Dechy (United States) M Tu	6	6
(Czech Republic) E Martincová (Italy) F Schiavone	2	3
(Spain) M Marrero (Spain) A Medina Garrigues	6^{5}	3
(Czech Republic) D Bedáňová (Russia) E Bovina	7^{7}	6
(Croatia) M Palaveršić (Venezuela) M Vento-Kabchi	7^{7}	2	1
2	(France) A Fusai (Italy) R Grande	6^{4}	6	6

Semifinals
(Russia) A Rodionova (Germany) C Schneider	5	6	2
5	(France) N Dechy (United States) M Tu	7	4	6
(Czech Republic) D Bedáňová (Russia) E Bovina	6	6
2	(France) A Fusai (Italy) R Grande	1	3

Final
5	(France) N Dechy (United States) M Tu	3	4
(Czech Republic) D Bedáňová (Russia) E Bovina	6	6
