= 2000 EuroTel Slovak Indoor =

- Date: 23–29 October
- Edition: 2nd
- Category: WTA Tier IV
- Draw: 32S / 16D
- Prize money: $110,000
- Surface: Hard / indoor
- Location: Bratislava, Slovakia
- Venue: Sibamac Arena

Champions

Singles
- (Czechoslovakia) Dája Bedáňová

Doubles
- (Slovakia) Karina Habšudová (Slovakia) Daniela Hantuchová
← 1999 ·	WTA Bratislava	· 2001 →

The 2000 EuroTel Slovak Indoor was a women's tennis tournament played on indoor hard courts at the Sibamac Arena in Bratislava, Slovakia that was part of the Tier IV category of the 2000 WTA Tour. It was the second edition of the tournament and was held from 23 October until 29 October 2000. Wildcard Dája Bedáňová won the singles title.

== Champions ==
=== Singles ===
(Czechoslovakia) Dája Bedáňová defeated (Netherlands) Miriam Oremans, 6–1, 5–7, 6–3

- It was Bedáňová's only singles title of her career.

=== Doubles ===
(Slovakia) Karina Habšudová / (Slovakia) Daniela Hantuchová defeated (Hungary) Petra Mandula / (Austria) Patricia Wartusch, walkover
