= 1999 Eurotel Slovak Indoor =

- Date: 18–24 October
- Edition: 1st
- Category: Tier IV
- Draw: 32S / 16D
- Prize money: $112,500
- Surface: Hard / indoor
- Location: Bratislava, Slovakia
- Venue: Sibamac Arena

Champions

Singles
- (France) Amélie Mauresmo

Doubles
- (Belgium) Kim Clijsters / (Belgium) Laurence Courtois
WTA Bratislava	· 2000 →

The 1999 Eurotel Slovak Indoor was a women's tennis tournament played on indoor hard courts at the Sibamac Arena in Bratislava, Slovakia that was part of the Tier IV category of the 1999 WTA Tour. It was the inaugural edition of the tournament and was held from 18 October until 24 October 1999. First-seeded Amélie Mauresmo won the singles title and earned $16,000 first-prize money.

== Finals ==
=== Singles ===
(France) Amélie Mauresmo defeated (Belgium) Kim Clijsters, 6–3, 6–3

- This was Mauresmo's first WTA singles title of her career.

=== Doubles ===
(Belgium) Kim Clijsters / (Belgium) Laurence Courtois defeated (Belarus) Olga Barabanschikova / (United States) Lilia Osterloh, 6–2, 3–6, 7–5

== Entrants ==
=== Seeds ===
Country	Player	Rank	Seed
FRA	Amélie Mauresmo	11	1
FRA	Nathalie Dechy	28	2
SVK	Henrieta Nagyová	33	3
BEL	Sabine Appelmans	35	4
USA	Corina Morariu	38	5
SVK	Karina Habšudová	43	6
AUT	Barbara Schwartz	50	7
BEL	Kim Clijsters	54	8

=== Other entrants ===
The following players received wildcards into the singles main draw:

- (Slovakia) Ľudmila Cervanová
- (Slovakia) Daniela Hantuchová

The following players received wildcards into the doubles main draw:

- (Slovakia) Ľudmila Cervanová / (Slovakia) Daniela Hantuchová

The following players received entry from the singles qualifying draw:

- (Czech Republic) Renata Kučerová
- (Czech Republic) Radka Pelikánová
- (Czech Republic) Sandra Kleinová
- (Hungary) Katalin Marosi

The following players received entry from the doubles qualifying draw:

- (Slovakia) Stanislava Hrozenská / (Slovakia) Andrea Šebová
