= 2001 EuroTel Slovak Indoors =

- Date: 15–21 October
- Edition: 3rd
- Category: Tier V
- Draw: 32S / 16D
- Prize money: $110,000
- Surface: Hard / indoor
- Location: Bratislava, Slovakia

Champions

Singles
- (Italy) Rita Grande

Doubles
- (Czech Republic) Dája Bedáňová / (Russia) Elena Bovina
| ← 2000 · | WTA Bratislava | · 2002 → |

The 2001 EuroTel Slovak Indoors was a women's tennis tournament played on indoor hard courts in Bratislava, Slovakia that was part of the Tier V category of the 2001 WTA Tour. It was the third edition of the tournament and was held from 15 October until 21 October 2001. Fourth-seeded Rita Grande won the singles title and earned $16,000 first-prize money.

== Finals ==
=== Singles ===
(Italy) Rita Grande defeated (Slovakia) Martina Suchá, 6–1, 6–1

- It was Grande's second singles title of the year and of her career.

=== Doubles ===
(Czech Republic) Dája Bedáňová / (Russia) Elena Bovina defeated (France) Nathalie Dechy / (United States) Meilen Tu, 6–3, 6–4
