= Alena Paulenková =

Slovak tennis player

- Country (sports): Slovakia
- Born: 5 January 1979 (age 47) Zvolen, Czechoslovakia
- Prize money: $27,126

Singles
- Career titles: 2 ITF
- Highest ranking: No. 392 (15 December 1997)

Doubles
- Career titles: 3 ITF
- Highest ranking: No. 301 (17 September 2001)

Alena Paulenková (born 5 January 1979) is a Slovak former professional tennis player.

Born in Zvolen, Paulenková reached a best singles ranking of 392 in the world during her career and won two ITF titles, both in 1997.

Paulenková made her WTA Tour main-draw debut in the doubles at the 1999 Slovak Indoor, where she and partner Radka Zrubáková were beaten in the first round by eventual champions, Kim Clijsters and Laurence Courtois. She featured in the doubles at Bratislava again in the 2000 edition, as a main-draw qualifier, partnering Martina Suchá.

== ITF finals ==
$25,000 tournaments
$10,000 tournaments

=== Singles: 2 (2–0) ===
Outcome	No.	Date	Tournament	Surface	Opponent	Score
Winner	1.	13 October 1997	ITF Coatzacoalcos, Mexico	Hard	(Mexico) Isabela Petrov	7–6^{(6)}, 7–6^{(3)}
Winner	2.	1 December 1997	ITF Cairo, Egypt	Clay	(Austria) Nicole Remis	6–3, 6–3

=== Doubles: 11 (3–8) ===
Outcome	No.	Date	Tournament	Surface	Partner	Opponents	Score
Runner-up	1.	7 October 1996	ITF Mexico City	Hard	(Mexico) Karin Palme	(United States) Tracey Hiete (Canada) Renata Kolbovic	3–6, 7–5, 4–6
Winner	1.	9 February 1998	ITF Faro, Portugal	Hard	(Czech Republic) Nikola Hübnerová	(United Kingdom) Abigail Tordoff (Portugal) Sofia Prazeres	6–2, 6–2
Runner-up	2.	6 April 1998	ITF Brindisi, Italy	Clay	(Slovakia) Gabriela Voleková	(Italy) Flavia Pennetta (Italy) Roberta Vinci	4–6, 6–7^{(5)}
Runner-up	3.	26 April 1999	ITF Coatzacoalcos, Mexico	Hard	(United States) Adria Engel	(Mexico) Melody Falcó (Dominican Republic) Joelle Schad	1–4 ret.
Runner-up	4.	17 October 1999	ITF Plzeň, Czech Republic	Clay	(Czech Republic) Magdalena Zděnovcová	(Czech Republic) Gabriela Chmelinová (Czech Republic) Olga Vymetálková	1–6, 2–6
Runner-up	5.	November 1999	ITF Stupava, Slovakia	Hard	(Slovakia) Radka Zrubáková	(Czech Republic) Gabriela Chmelinová (Czech Republic) Hana Šromová	1–6, 0–6
Runner-up	6.	7 February 2000	ITF Mallorca, Spain	Clay	(Slovakia) Andrea Šebová	(Czech Republic) Gabriela Chmelinová (Czech Republic) Jana Macurová	2–6, 1–6
Runner-up	7.	30 September 2000	ITF Tbilisi, Georgia	Clay	(Netherlands) Jolanda Mens	(Argentina) Mariana Díaz Oliva (Italy) Mara Santangelo	6–4, 3–6, 2–6
Winner	2.	30 October 2000	ITF Cairo, Egypt	Clay	(Slovakia) Katarína Bašternáková	(Austria) Daniela Klemenschits (Japan) Ayako Suzuki	1–4, 5–4^{(3)}, 4–1, 4–0
Runner-up	8.	20 November 2000	ITF Mallorca, Spain	Clay	(Serbia and Montenegro) Dragana Ilić	(Argentina) Vanesa Krauth (Argentina) Erica Krauth	0–4, 0–4
Winner	3.	9 July 2001	ITF Sezze, Italy	Clay	(Bosnia and Herzegovina) Mervana Jugić-Salkić	(Argentina) Marisol Berengeno (Italy) Margot Torre	6–0, 6–1
