= Mara Santangelo =

Italian tennis player

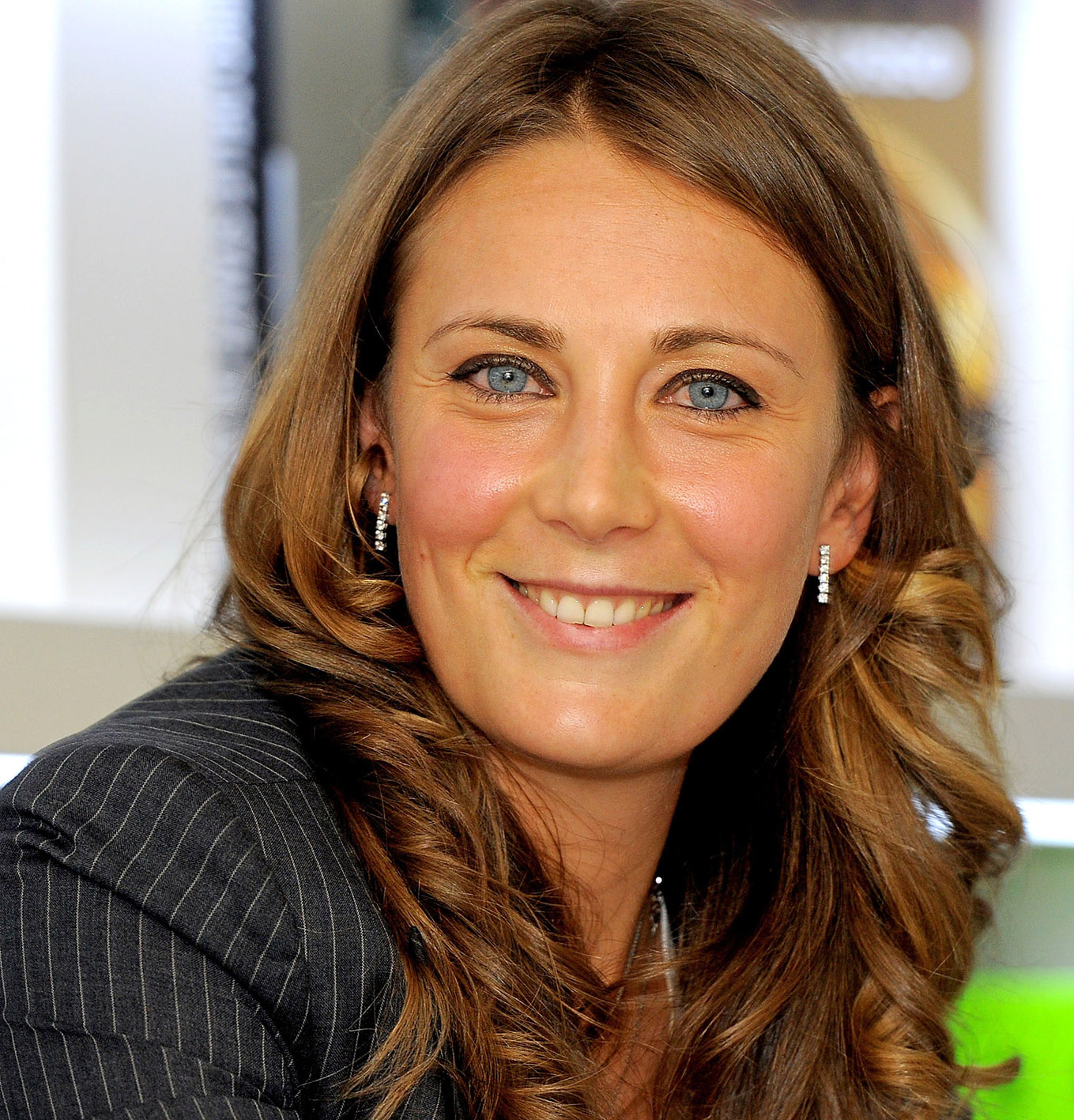
- Country (sports): Italy
- Residence: Rome, Italy
- Born: 28 June 1981 (age 45) Latina, Lazio, Italy
- Height: 1.83 m (6 ft 0 in)
- Turned pro: 1998
- Retired: 28 January 2011
- Plays: Right-handed (two-handed backhand)
- Prize money: $1,691,518

Singles
- Career record: 286–238
- Career titles: 1
- Highest ranking: No. 27 (9 July 2007)

Grand Slam singles results
- Australian Open: 4R (2004)
- French Open: 3R (2007)
- Wimbledon: 3R (2007)
- US Open: 3R (2006)

Doubles
- Career record: 219–143
- Career titles: 9
- Highest ranking: No. 5 (10 September 2007)

Grand Slam doubles results
- Australian Open: SF (2009)
- French Open: W (2007)
- Wimbledon: SF (2007)
- US Open: 3R (2007)

Team competitions
- Fed Cup: W (2006)

Mara Santangelo (born 28 June 1981) is a former tennis player from Italy and Grand Slam champion in doubles, winning 2007 French Open. As single player, she won a decisive match in the final Italy vs Belgium against Kirsten Flipkens allowing her national team to win for the first time the 2006 Fed Cup.

== Tennis career ==
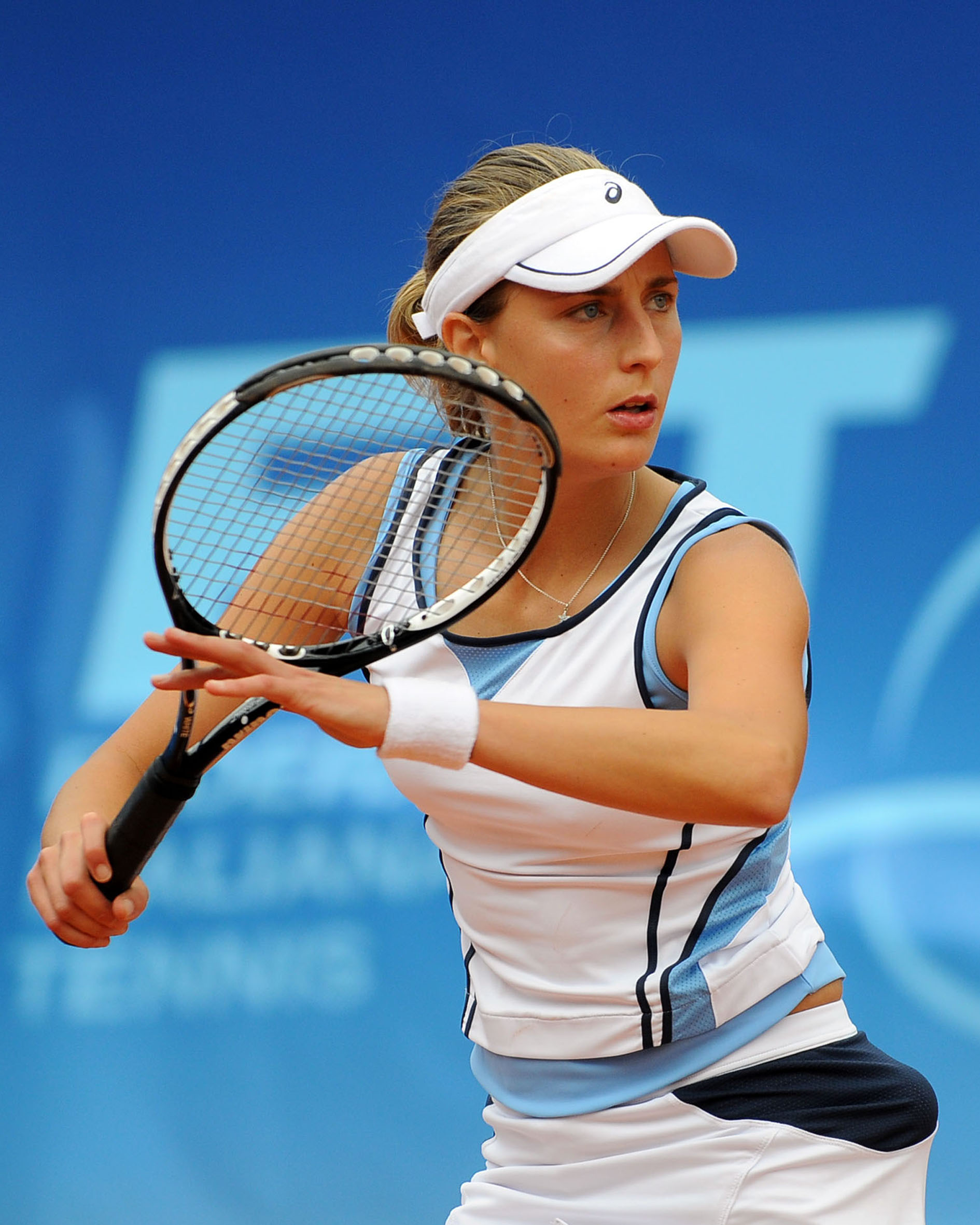
Mara Santangelo

Santangelo reached the fourth round at the 2004 Australian Open, defeating 16th-seeded Magüi Serna, Barbara Schett, and 19th-seeded Eleni Daniilidou—losing to eventual champion and world No. 1 Justine Henin, after having been up 4–2 in the second set. She also won her first WTA Tour title in 2006, defeating Jelena Kostanić in the final.

She took a set from top-seeded Amélie Mauresmo in the third round of the 2006 US Open, and led 2–0 in the deciding set, only to lose the next six games. She also defeated Anastasia Myskina in 2006, her first win over a top-20 player. She and her Italian teammates Francesca Schiavone, Flavia Pennetta, and Roberta Vinci beat the Belgian team 3–2 in the 2006 Fed Cup final. Justine Henin had to retire in the fifth and final match because of an injury in her right knee, which allowed Italy to win their first Fed Cup trophy.

Despite holding match points in both matches, Santangelo lost to Agnieszka Radwańska and Dinara Safina in successive first rounds at Luxembourg and Stuttgart respectively, in three-set matches. In Moscow, Santangelo lost in the first round to Iveta Benešová in another three-set match. In Linz, Santangelo defeated Alona Bondarenko; she lost to eventual semifinalist Nicole Vaidišová. At her final tournament of the year in Hasselt, Santangelo retired while 5–2 down against Michaëlla Krajicek in the first round. She ended the year ranked world No. 31, a new career high.

Santangelo was still recovering from injury when 2007 commenced. At her first tournament in Hobart, she defeated countrywoman Maria Elena Camerin in the first round, losing to Catalina Castaño in the second round. At the Australian Open, Santangelo drew then-world No. 81 eventual champion Serena Williams in the first round, losing in two sets. She reached her first quarterfinal of the year at the Tier IV Pattaya City tournament, losing to Sania Mirza in straight sets. At her very next tournament, the Tier III Bangalore, as the defending champion, Santangelo made the final for the second straight year, where she lost to Yaroslava Shvedova in the final.

In Doha during the second round, Santangelo faced fellow countrywoman Francesca Schiavone and led 6–4, 6–6 (6–5), but lost 6–4, 6–7, 0–1 ret., after dropping a match point. She rebounded during her next tournament, however, in Key Biscayne, defeating Jelena Janković in the third round in three sets – which was the first top-10 victory of her career. She lost in the round of 16 to Anna Chakvetadze. Reaching the fourth round of Key Biscayne has thus far been the best showing of Santangelo's in a high-tier event.

During the clay court season, Santangelo defeated Nadia Petrova in the second round of Warsaw, for her second career top-10 victory, reaching her third quarterfinal of the year. She lost to eventual champion Henin. At the French Open, in singles, Santangelo reached the third round, losing to eventual champion Henin. For doubles, however, partnering Alicia Molik, she won the championship, winning her first Grand Slam title. The victory was her fourth title in doubles for the year, with four different partners at each championship.

In 2007 Wimbledon Championships, Santangelo was defeated in round three by the defending champion and fourth-seeded Amélie Mauresmo, in 57 minutes. Santangelo took part in the 2007 Fed Cup final, where she was defeated by Svetlana Kuznetsova in the second rubber and by Elena Vesnina in the fourth rubber; Italy failed to defend the title, and Russia won the trophy with a 4–0 score. Santangelo had to miss the warm-ups for the Australian Open and the Australian Open itself in 2008 because of a troublesome left foot injury. She also missed the Paris Indoors event and the Bangalore Open event, where she had previously won a WTA-level title and been a runner-up.

Santangelo returned from an eight-month left foot injury lay-off in May; she reached the second round twice (including the 2008 Wimbledon Championships), and she won two ITF tournaments, Biella and Ortisei. At the Beijing Olympics, she was defeated by Dinara Safina in the first round.

In 2009, once again plagued by her foot injury, Santangelo won three doubles tournaments, all of them partnering Nathalie Dechy: Auckland Open where they defeated Nuria Llagostera Vives and Arantxa Parra Santonja, the Monterrey Open with a two-sets win over Iveta Benešová and Barbora Záhlavová-Strýcová and, finally, Strasbourg, defeating Claire Feuerstein and Stéphanie Foretz with a 6–0, 6–1 score. On 6 September, partnering Laura Olivieri, she won the 2009 European Beach Tennis Championships with a straight-sets win over the defending champions, Simona Briganti and Rossella Stefanelli.

In May 2010, Santangelo announced her decision to compete in doubles events only, citing her recurrent left foot injury as the main cause that persuaded her to renounce to play singles matches. On 28 January 2011, she declared her retirement from professional tennis due to recurring injuries with her left foot.

== Personal life ==
Santangelo was born in Latina, but grew up in the Fiemme Valley in Trentino. She started playing tennis at the age of 6. Her mother, Patrizia, died in a car accident in 1997, when she was sixteen.

Santangelo is a Catholic. In 2010, she went on a pilgrimage to Our Lady of Medjugorje, and has been vocal about her faith since then. Santangelo has written an autobiography, Te lo prometto (I promise you), based on her tennis career and spiritual life.

== Grand Slam tournament finals ==
=== Doubles: 1 (title) ===
Result	Year	Championship	Surface	Partner	Opponents	Score
Win	2007	French Open	Clay	(Australia) Alicia Molik	(Slovenia) Katarina Srebotnik (Japan) Ai Sugiyama	7–6^{(7–5)}, 6–4

== WTA Tour finals ==
=== Singles: 2 (1 title, 1 runner-up) ===
Legend
Grand Slam
Tier I
Tier II
Tier III (1–1)
Tier IV & V

Result	W/L	Date	Tournament	Surface	Opponent	Score
Win	1–0	Feb 2006	Bangalore Open	Hard	(Croatia) Jelena Kostanić	3–6, 7–6^{(7–5)}, 6–3
Loss	1–1	Feb 2007	Bangalore Open	Hard	(Russia) Yaroslava Shvedova	4–6, 4–6

=== Doubles: 12 (9 titles, 3 runner-ups) ===
Legend: Before 2009	Legend: Starting in 2009
Grand Slam (1–0)
Tier I (1–0)	Premier Mandatory (0–0)
Tier II (2–1)	Premier 5 (0–0)
Tier III (1–0)	Premier (0–0)
Tier IV & V (1–2)	International (3–0)

Result	W/L	Date	Tournament	Surface	Partner	Opponents	Score
Win	1–0	Oct 2004	Hasselt	Hard (i)	(United States) Jennifer Russell	(Spain) Nuria Llagostera Vives (Spain) Marta Marrero	6–3, 7–5
Loss	1–1	Oct 2004	Tashkent	Hard	(France) Marion Bartoli	(Italy) Adriana Serra Zanetti (Italy) Antonella Serra Zanetti	6–1, 3–6, 4–6
Loss	1–2	Aug 2005	Stockholm	Hard	(Czech Republic) Eva Birnerová	(France) Émilie Loit (Slovenia) Katarina Srebotnik	4–6, 3–6
Win	2–2	Feb 2007	Pattaya City	Hard	(Australia) Nicole Pratt	(Chinese Taipei) Chan Yung-jan (Chinese Taipei) Chuang Chia-jung	6–4, 7–6^{(7–4)}
Win	3–2	Apr 2007	Amelia Island	Clay	(Slovenia) Katarina Srebotnik	(Spain) Anabel Medina Garrigues (Spain) Virginia Ruano Pascual	6–3, 7–6^{(7–4)}
Win	4–2	May 2007	Rome	Clay	(France) Nathalie Dechy	(Italy) Tathiana Garbin (Italy) Roberta Vinci	6–4, 6–1
Win	5–2	Jun 2007	French Open	Clay	(Australia) Alicia Molik	(Slovenia) Katarina Srebotnik (Japan) Ai Sugiyama	7–6^{(7–5)}, 6–4
Loss	5–3	Aug 2007	Los Angeles	Hard	(Australia) Alicia Molik	(Czech Republic) Květa Peschke (Australia) Rennae Stubbs	0–6, 1–6
Win	6–3	Aug 2007	New Haven	Hard	(India) Sania Mirza	(Zimbabwe) Cara Black (United States) Liezel Huber	6–1, 6–2
Win	7–3	Jan 2009	Auckland	Hard	(France) Nathalie Dechy	(Spain) Nuria Llagostera Vives (Spain) Arantxa Parra Santonja	4–6, 7–6^{(7–3)}, [12–10]
Win	8–3	Mar 2009	Monterrey	Hard	(France) Nathalie Dechy	(Czech Republic) Iveta Benešová (Czech Republic) Barbora Záhlavová-Strýcová	6–3, 6–4
Win	9–3	May 2009	Strasbourg	Clay	(France) Nathalie Dechy	(France) Claire Feuerstein (France) Stéphanie Foretz	6–0, 6–1

== ITF finals ==
Legend
$100,000 tournaments
$75,000 tournaments
$50,000 tournaments
$25,000 tournaments
$10,000 tournaments

=== Singles (8–4) ===
Result	No.	Date	Tournament	Surface	Opponent	Score
Win	1.	14 August 2000	ITF Aosta, Italy	Clay	(Romania) Andreea Ehritt-Vanc	1–6, 6–0, 6–1
Win	2.	27 August 2000	ITF Cuneo, Italy	Clay	(France) Edith Nunes	6–2, 3–6, 6–3
Loss	3.	24 June 2002	ITF Fontanafredda, Italy	Clay	(Ukraine) Alona Bondarenko	3–6, 0–6
Win	4.	25 August 2002	Maribor Open, Slovenia	Clay	(Romania) Edina Gallovits-Hall	6–2, 6–3
Loss	5.	8 September 2002	ITF Fano, Italy	Clay	(Italy) Flavia Pennetta	6–3, 4–6, 0–6
Loss	6.	20 October 2002	Open de Touraine, France	Hard (i)	(France) Camille Pin	6–2, 3–6, 0–6
Win	7.	2 February 2003	ITF Ortisei, Italy	Carpet (i)	(Sweden) Sofia Arvidsson	2–6, 6–2, 6–2
Win	8.	29 March 2005	ITF Poza Rica, Mexico	Hard	(Japan) Ryōko Fuda	3–6, 6–2, 6–0
Win	9.	26 April 2005	ITF Taranto, Italy	Clay	(Hungary) Kira Nagy	6–1, 6–0
Loss	10.	23 October 2005	Open Saint Raphael, France	Hard (i)	(Estonia) Maret Ani	3–6, 5–7
Win	11.	20 July 2008	ITF Biella, Italy	Clay	(Croatia) Jelena Kostanić Tošić	6–3, 6–1
Win	12.	19 October 2008	ITF Ortisei, Italy	Carpet (i)	(Germany) Kristina Barrois	6–3, ret.

=== Doubles (14–5) ===
Result	No.	Date	Tournament	Surface	Partner	Opponents	Score
Loss	1.	16 August 1998	Alghero, Italy	Hard	(Italy) Laura Dell'Angelo	(Italy) Alessia Lombardi (Italy) Elena Pioppo	6–3, 2–6, 4–6
Win	2.	14 September 1998	Reggio di Calabria, Italy	Clay	(Italy) Katia Altilia	(Romania) Andreea Ehritt-Vanc (Italy) Elena Pioppo	7–6^{(3)}, 4–6, 6–4
Win	3.	26 September 1999	Horb, Germany	Clay	(New Zealand) Rewa Hudson	(Slovakia) Eva Fislová (Slovakia) Andrea Šebová	6–2, 6–2
Loss	4.	30 August 1999	Zadar, Croatia	Clay	(Netherlands) Natasha Galouza	(Czech Republic) Jana Macurová (Czech Republic) Olga Vymetálková	1–6, 3–6
Win	5.	13 September 1999	Biograd na Moru, Croatia	Clay	(Netherlands) Natasha Galouza	(Slovakia) Silvia Uríčková (Slovakia) Eva Fislová	6–2, 6–2
Win	6.	4 October 1999	Girona, Spain	Clay	(Sweden) Maria Wolfbrandt	(Spain) Marina Escobar (Spain) Rocia Gonzalez	6–7^{(3)}, 6–1, 6–3
Win	7.	10 April 2000	Hvar, Croatia	Clay	(Croatia) Marijana Kovačević	(Czech Republic) Zuzana Hejdová (Czech Republic) Petra Kučová	6–3, 4–6, 6–3
Loss	8.	30 April 2000	Cerignola, Italy	Clay	(Italy) Maria Elena Camerin	(Russia) Maria Boboedova (Armenia) Liudmila Nikoyan	w/o
Win	9.	20 August 2000	Aosta, Italy	Clay	(Italy) Maria Elena Camerin	(Romania) Oana-Elena Golimbioschi (Romania) Andreea Ehritt-Vanc	7–5, 4–6, 6–1
Win	10.	27 August 2000	Cuneo, Italy	Clay	(Italy) Maria Elena Camerin	(Italy) Silvia Disderi (Italy) Anna Floris	7–5, 6–2
Win	11.	3 September 2000	Spoleto, Italy	Clay	(Italy) Maria Elena Camerin	(Romania) Oana-Elena Golimbioschi (Romania) Andreea Ehritt-Vanc	w/o
Win	12.	30 September 2000	Tbilisi, Georgia	Clay	(Argentina) Mariana Díaz Oliva	(Netherlands) Jolanda Mens (Slovakia) Alena Paulenková	4–6, 6–3, 6–2
Loss	13.	21 July 2003	Innsbruck, Austria	Clay	(Hungary) Melinda Czink	(Hungary) Kira Nagy (Sweden) Maria Wolfbrandt	4–6, 6–4, 4–6
Loss	14.	18 August 2003	Bronx Open, United States	Hard	(Tunisia) Selima Sfar	(Ukraine) Yuliya Beygelzimer (Belarus) Tatiana Poutchek	4–6, 5–7
Win	15.	14 September 2003	Open Denain, France	Clay	(Italy) Antonella Serra Zanetti	(Ukraine) Yuliya Beygelzimer (Belarus) Tatiana Poutchek	7–5, 6–3
Win	16.	12 October 2003	Latina, Italy	Clay	(Italy) Roberta Vinci	(Estonia) Maret Ani (Czech Republic) Libuše Průšová	3–6, 6–2, 6–4
Win	17.	2 April 2005	Poza Rica, Mexico	Hard	(Netherlands) Seda Noorlander	(Austria) Daniela Klemenschits (Austria) Sandra Klemenschits	6–2, 4–6, 6–3
Win	18.	5 June 2005	Prostějov, Czech Republic	Clay	(Ukraine) Yuliya Beygelzimer	(Czech Republic) Dája Bedáňová (Czech Republic) Barbora Záhlavová-Strýcová	6–1, 4–6, 6–2
Win	19.	3 August 2008	Rimini, Italy	Clay	(Italy) Roberta Vinci	(Switzerland) Stefanie Vögele (Germany) Kathrin Wörle	6–1, 6–4

== Grand Slam performance timelines ==
Key
W	F	SF	QF	#R	RR	Q#	DNQ	A	NH

(W) winner; (F) finalist; (SF) semifinalist; (QF) quarterfinalist; (#R) rounds 4, 3, 2, 1; (RR) round-robin stage; (Q#) qualification round; (DNQ) did not qualify; (A) absent; (NH) not held; (SR) strike rate (events won / competed); (W–L) win–loss record.

=== Singles ===
Tournament	2003	2004	2005	2006	2007	2008	2009	W–L
Australian Open	Q3	4R	1R	3R	1R	A	1R	5–5
French Open	Q1	1R	1R	2R	3R	1R	1R	3–6
Wimbledon	Q2	1R	2R	1R	3R	2R	Q1	4–5
US Open	1R	1R	1R	3R	1R	A	A	2–5

=== Doubles ===
Tournament	2004	2005	2006	2007	2008	2009	W–L
Australian Open	1R	QF	1R	1R	A	SF	7–5
French Open	2R	1R	2R	W	1R	1R	8–5
Wimbledon	3R	2R	2R	SF	1R	1R	8–6
US Open	1R	1R	2R	3R	2R	A	4–5

== Head-to-head record against top players ==
Players who have been ranked world No. 1 are in boldface.

- **Martina Hingis** 0–1
- Nadia Petrova 1–2
- **Serena Williams** 0–2
- **Dinara Safina** 0–3
- Elena Dementieva 0–2
- **Jelena Janković** 1–3
- Nicole Vaidišová 1–1
- **Lindsay Davenport** 0–1
- Elena Vesnina 1–1
- Flavia Pennetta 0–3
- **Ana Ivanovic** 0–2
- Agnieszka Radwańska 1–1
