= Tiffany Dabek =

American tennis player

- Full name: Tiffany Dabek Davis
- Country (sports): United States
- Residence: Bradenton, Florida
- Born: March 14, 1980 (age 46) Los Angeles, California
- Plays: Right-handed
- Prize money: $138,325

Singles
- Career record: 203–214
- Career titles: 5 ITF
- Highest ranking: No. 170 (September 12, 2005)

Grand Slam singles results
- US Open: 1R (2005)

Doubles
- Career titles: 4 ITF
- Highest ranking: No. 254 (February 9, 2004)

Tiffany Dabek Davis (born March 14, 1980) is a former professional tennis player from the United States.

== Biography ==
Born in Los Angeles, Dabek later moved to Bradenton, Florida and was a top ranked junior in the state.

Dabek, a right-handed player, started competing on the professional tour in the 1998 season. In 2001 she qualified for the main draw of two WTA Tour tournaments, the Morocco Open in Casablanca and the Tournoi de Québec. The following year she qualified a second time in Casablanca. She won both the singles and doubles titles at the $25k tournament in Raleigh, North Carolina in 2003. Her biggest performance came at the 2005 US Open where she made it through the qualifying draw, with wins over Kateřina Böhmová, Tsvetana Pironkova and Maria Fernanda Alves, all in three set matches. In the opening round of the main draw, she was beaten by seeded Russian Vera Dushevina. She peaked at No. 170 in the world rankings after the US Open and continued on tour until 2007.

She is a qualified dietician and was formerly a teaching pro at River Strand Golf and Country Club.

== ITF finals ==
$25,000 tournaments
$10,000 tournaments

=== Singles (5–3) ===
Result	No.	Date	Tournament	Surface	Opponent	Score
Win	1.	2 October 2000	Hallandale Beach, United States	Clay	(Slovakia) Gabriela Voleková	5–3, 2–4, 4–2, 3–5, 4–2
Loss	2.	20 January 2002	Gainesville, United States	Hard	(Canada) Vanessa Webb	4–6, 0–6
Loss	3.	23 June 2002	Tallinn, Estonia	Clay	(Czech Republic) Petra Cetkovská	3–6, 6–4, 1–6
Win	4.	22 September 2003	Raleigh, United States	Clay	(Romania) Edina Gallovits-Hall	3–6, 7–5, 6–3
Win	5.	20 April 2004	Hamanako, Japan	Carpet	(Chinese Taipei) Chan Chin-wei	6–2, 6–3
Loss	6.	9 October 2004	Lagos Open, Nigeria	Hard	(India) Sania Mirza	3–6, 7–5, 3–6
Win	7.	23 October 2004	Lagos Open, Nigeria	Hard	(Romania) Ágnes Szatmári	7–5, 6–0
Win	8.	15 January 2006	Tampa, United States	Hard	(Russia) Vasilisa Bardina	5–7, 7–6^{(3)}, 6–3

=== Doubles (4–4) ===
Result	No	Date	Tournament	Surface	Partner	Opponents	Score
Loss	1.	22 November 1998	São Paulo, Brazil	Clay	(Ukraine) Yulia Mirna	(Slovakia) Andrea Šebová (Slovakia) Silvia Uricková	0–6, 2–6
Win	2.	13 August 2000	Lima, Peru	Clay	(Uruguay) Cecilia Guillenea	(Argentina) Vanina García Sokol (Uruguay) Claudia Salgues	7–6, 6–2
Win	3.	20 August 2000	La Paz, Bolivia	Clay	(Uruguay) Cecilia Guillenea	(Brazil) Nathália Bellizia (Brazil) Ana Paula Novaes	6–3, 6–3
Loss	4.	13 May 2002	Bromma, Sweden	Clay	(Brazil) Joana Cortez	(Serbia and Montenegro) Katarina Mišić (Federal Republic of Yugoslavia) Dragana Zarić	4–6, 4–6
Win	5.	22 September 2003	Raleigh, United States	Clay	(Brazil) Maria Fernanda Alves	(Canada) Maureen Drake (Romania) Edina Gallovits-Hall	2–6, 6–3, 6–1
Loss	6.	23 November 2003	Puebla, Mexico	Hard	(Bulgaria) Dimana Krastevitch	(United States) Stephanie Hazlett (United States) Kaysie Smashey	1–6, 5–7
Loss	7.	9 April 2006	Pelham, United States	Clay	(South Africa) Chanelle Scheepers	(United States) Tetiana Luzhanska (Indonesia) Romana Tedjakusuma	4–6, 1–6
Win	8.	23 May 2006	Grado Tennis Cup, Italy	Clay	(South Africa) Chanelle Scheepers	(France) Mailyne Andrieux (Croatia) Nika Ožegović	6–4, 4–6, 7–6
