= 2002 VUB Open =

- Date: 14–20 October
- Edition: 4th
- Category: Tier V
- Draw: 32S / 16D
- Prize money: $110,000
- Surface: Hard / indoor
- Location: Bratislava, Slovakia
- Venue: Sibamac Arena

Champions

Singles
- (Slovenia) Maja Matevžič

Doubles
- (Slovenia) Maja Matevžič / (Slovakia) Henrieta Nagyová
← 2001 ·	WTA Bratislava

The 2002 VUB Open was a women's tennis tournament played on indoor hard courts at the Sibamac Arena in Bratislava, Slovakia that was part of the Tier V category of the 2002 WTA Tour. It was the fourth and final edition of the tournament and was held from 14 October until 20 October 2002. Unseeded Maja Matevžič won the singles title and earned $16,000 first-prize money.

== Finals ==
=== Singles ===
(Slovenia) Maja Matevžič defeated (Czech Republic) Iveta Benešová, 6–0, 6–1

- It was Matevžič' only WTA singles title of her career.

=== Doubles ===
(Slovenia) Maja Matevžič / (Slovakia) Henrieta Nagyová defeated (France) Nathalie Dechy / (United States) Meilen Tu, 6–4, 6–0
