= Zuzana Ondrášková =

Czech tennis player

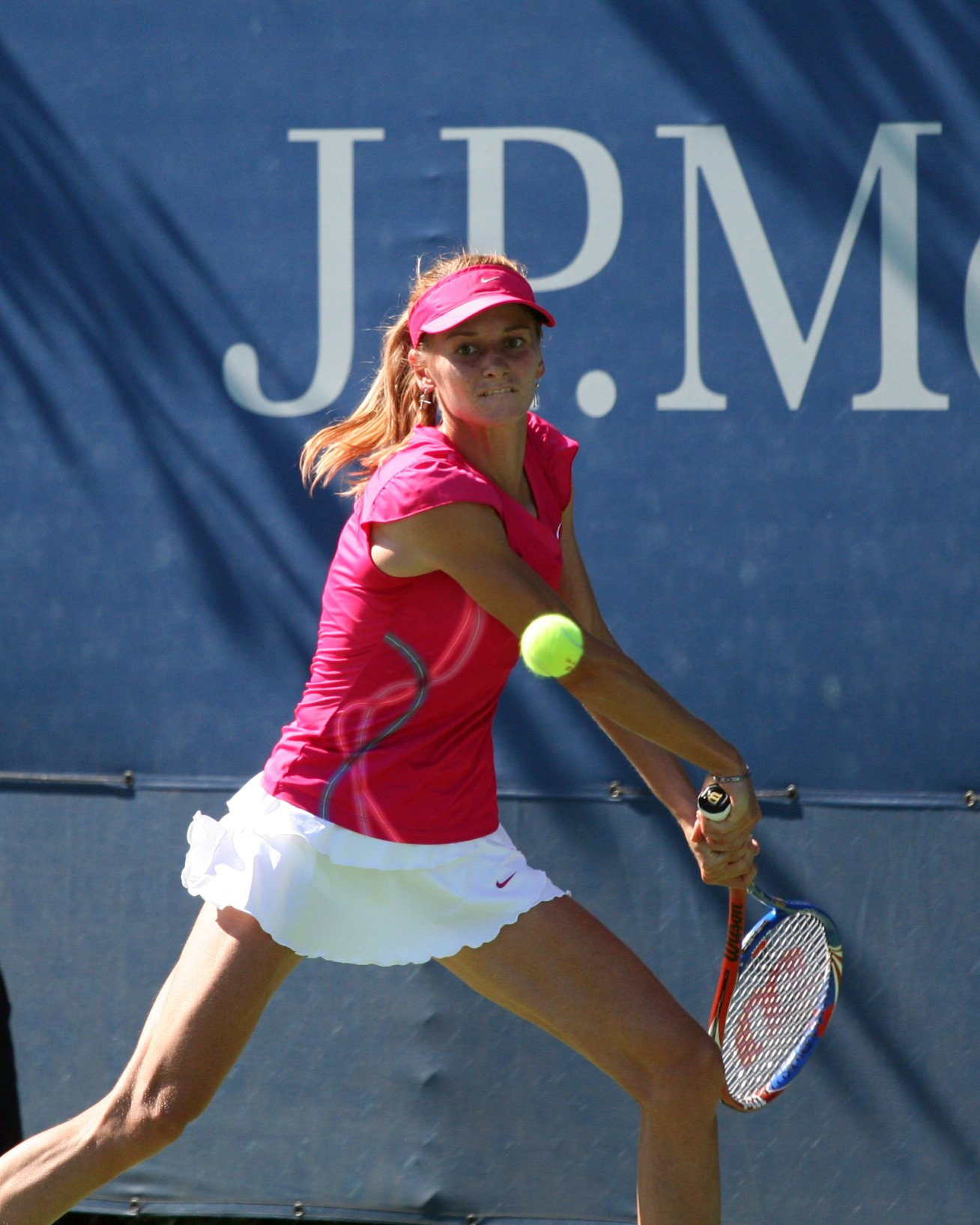
- Ondrášková playing at the 2010 US Open
- Country (sports): Czech Republic
- Residence: Opava, Czech Republic
- Born: 3 May 1980 (age 45) Opava, Czechoslovakia
- Height: 1.74 m (5 ft 9 in)
- Turned pro: 1995
- Retired: 2013
- Plays: Right (two handed backhand)
- Prize money: $879,679

Singles
- Career record: 426–273
- Career titles: 20 ITF
- Highest ranking: No. 74 (9 February 2004)

Grand Slam singles results
- Australian Open: 2R (2006, 2007)
- French Open: 2R (2003, 2006)
- Wimbledon: 1R (2002, 2003, 2005, 2007, 2008, 2011)
- US Open: 1R (2003, 2005, 2006, 2010)

Doubles
- Career record: 21–42
- Highest ranking: No. 295 (2 August 2004)

Zuzana Ondrášková (born 3 May 1980) is a Czech former professional tennis player.

== Career ==
On 9 February 2004, she reached her highest singles ranking of world No. 74.

Her career included wins over several top players, including Dinara Safina, Li Na, Daniela Hantuchová, Marion Bartoli and Jelena Dokic.

In her career, she reached one WTA Tour singles final, 2005 at Prague. In addition, she reached the semifinals of the 2010 WTA Budapest as well as two additional quarterfinals, 2005 at Forest Hills and 2006 at Estoril. Ondrášková found most of her success on the ITF Women's Circuit, making 31 singles finals and winning 20 titles. She announced her retirement in 2013, at age 33.

== WTA Tour finals ==
=== Singles: 1 (runner-up) ===
Tier I
Tier II
Tier III
Tier IV & V (0–1)

Result	Date	Tournament	Surface	Opponent	Score
Loss	May 2005	Prague, Czech Republic	Clay	(Russia) Dinara Safina	7–6^{(7–2)}, 6–3

== ITF finals ==
Legend
$100,000 tournaments
$75,000 tournaments
$50,000 tournaments
$25,000 tournaments
$10,000 tournaments

=== Singles (20–11) ===
Result	No.	Date	Tournament	Surface	Opponent	Score
Win	1.	14 June 1998	ITF Kędzierzyn-Koźle, Poland	Clay	(Czech Republic) Milena Nekvapilová	0–6, 6–1, 6–2
Win	2.	19 July 1998	ITF Civitanova, Italy	Clay	(Czech Republic) Magdalena Zděnovcová	6–2, 6–2
Win	3.	15 November 1998	ITF Bossonnens, Switzerland	Carpet (i)	(Switzerland) Laura Bao	6–2, 7–5
Loss	1.	9 November 1998	ITF Biel, Switzerland	Carpet (i)	(Czech Republic) Alena Vašková	3–6, 1–6
Loss	2.	30 November 1998	ITF Přerov, Czech Republic	Carpet (i)	(Czech Republic) Libuše Průšová	3–6, 3–6
Loss	3.	27 February 2000	ITF Buchen, Germany	Carpet (i)	(Czech Republic) Radka Pelikánová	3–6, 5–7
Win	4.	9 April 2000	ITF Makarska, Croatia	Clay	(Ukraine) Yuliya Beygelzimer	6–2, 6–3
Win	5.	18 June 2000	ITF Kędzierzyn-Koźle, Poland	Clay	(Ukraine) Olga Lazarchuk	7–5, 6–4
Win	6.	31 October 2004	ITF Toruń, Poland	Clay	(Czech Republic) Gabriela Navrátilová	6–0, 6–4
Win	7.	20 August 2000	ITF Valašské Meziříčí, Czech Republic	Clay	(Czech Republic) Lucie Šteflová	6–4, 6–1
Win	8.	1 October 2000	ITF Makarska, Croatia	Clay	(Romania) Oana Elena Golimbioschi	6–2, 6–2
Win	9.	8 October 2000	ITF Makarska, Croatia	Clay	(Romania) Ioana Gașpar	6–2, 6–3
Win	10.	9 September 2001	ITF Fano, Italy	Clay	(Israel) Anna Smashnova	3–6, 6–1, 7–5
Win	11.	10 February 2002	ITF Redbridge, UK	Hard (i)	(Russia) Galina Fokina	5–7, 6–2, 7–5
Win	12.	17 February 2002	ITF Sutton, UK	Hard (i)	(Serbia and Montenegro) Dragana Zarić	7–6^{(7–5)}, 6–4
Loss	4.	14 April 2002	ITF Dinan, France	Clay (i)	(France) Émilie Loit	2–6, 5–7
Win	13.	2 March 2003	ITF Ostrava, Czech Republic	Carpet (i)	(United Kingdom) Anne Keothavong	6–4, 7–6^{(7–1)}
Loss	5.	13 April 2003	ITF Dinan, France	Clay (i)	(Czech Republic) Eva Birnerová	6–1, 2–6, 3–6
Win	14.	20 April 2003	Open de Biarritz, France	Clay	(Argentina) Natalia Gussoni	6–0, 6–3
Win	15.	21 September 2003	ITF Bordeaux, France	Clay	(Spain) Anabel Medina Garrigues	6–7^{(4–7)}, 6–4, 6–3
Loss	6.	6 June 2004	ITF Prostějov, Czech Republic	Clay	(China) Peng Shuai	1–6, 3–6
Loss	7.	10 April 2005	ITF Dinan, France	Clay	(Italy) Roberta Vinci	5–7, 5–7
Win	16.	12 June 2005	Zagreb Ladies Open, Croatia	Clay	(Bulgaria) Tsvetana Pironkova	4–6, 6–4, 6–3
Win	17.	7 September 2008	ITF Brno, Czech Republic	Clay	(Latvia) Anastasija Sevastova	6–4, 3–6, 6–2
Win	18.	28 March 2009	ITF Latina, Italy	Clay	(Poland) Anna Korzeniak	7–5, 6–7^{(3–7)}, 6–2
Loss	8.	3 May 2009	Open de Cagnes-sur-Mer, France	Clay	(Italy) Maria Elena Camerin	1–6, 2–6
Loss	9.	24 April 2010	ITF Bari, Italy	Clay	(Slovakia) Zuzana Kučová	4–6, 2–6
Win	19.	6 June 2010	ITF Brno, Czech Republic	Clay	(Slovakia) Kristína Kučová	6–3, 4–6, 6–2
Loss	10.	1 August 2010	ITF Bucharest, Romania	Clay	(Australia) Jelena Dokic	6–3, 1–6, 6–7^{(3–7)}
Loss	11.	12 September 2010	Internazionali di Biella, Italy	Clay	(Czech Republic) Renata Voráčová	4–6, 2–6
Win	20.	19 September 2010	Save Cup, Italy	Clay	(Czech Republic) Lucie Hradecká	6–3, 6–3

=== Doubles (0–2) ===
Result	No.	Date	Tournament	Surface	Partner	Opponents	Score
Loss	1.	9 November 1998	ITF Bossonnens, Switzerland	Carpet (i)	(Czech Republic) Dája Bedáňová	(Czech Republic) Zuzana Hejdová (Czech Republic) Alena Vašková	4–6, 6–7^{(5–7)}
Loss	2.	20 February 2000	ITF Pécs, Hungary	Clay (i)	(Hungary) Kinga Berecz	(Czech Republic) Petra Kučová (Czech Republic) Blanka Kumbárová	5–7, 2–6
