= Andrea Šebová =

Slovak tennis player

- Full name: Andrea Hradecká Šebová
- Country (sports): Slovakia
- Born: 4 September 1980 (age 45) Partizánske, Czechoslovakia
- Prize money: $24,810

Singles
- Career titles: 3 ITF
- Highest ranking: No. 329 (30 November 1998)

Doubles
- Career titles: 5 ITF
- Highest ranking: No. 239 (27 September 1999)
Medal record
Tennis
Representing Slovakia
Summer Universiade
| Bronze medal – third place | 1999 Palma de Mallorca | Women's singles |
| Bronze medal – third place | 1999 Palma de Mallorca | Women's doubles |

Andrea Hradecká Šebová (born 4 September 1980) is a Slovak former professional tennis player.

== Biography ==
Born in Partizánske, Šebová was ranked as high as five in the world as a junior.

Šebová spent most of her professional career on the ITF Circuit and won eight titles, three in singles and five in doubles. She made her only WTA Tour main-draw appearance at the 1999 Eurotel Slovak Indoor where she and Stanislava Hrozenská qualified for the doubles.

At the 1999 Summer Universiade in Mallorca, she won bronze medals in both the women's singles and doubles events.

Šebová, who left professional tennis in 2001, was married in 2004 to Radoslav Hradecký.

== ITF finals ==
Legend
$25,000 tournaments
$10,000 tournaments

=== Singles (3–1) ===
| Result | No. | Date | Tournament | Surface | Opponent | Score |
|---|---|---|---|---|---|---|
| Win | 1. | 11 January 1998 | San Antonio, United States | Hard | (United States) Mashona Washington | 7–5, 6–1 |
| Win | 2. | 16 November 1998 | São Paulo, Brazil | Clay | (Uruguay) Daniela Olivera | 6–4, 6–3 |
| Win | 3. | 23 August 1999 | Skiathos, Greece | Clay | (Austria) Nicole Melch | 6–0, 6–4 |
| Loss | 4. | 13 February 2000 | Mallorca, Spain | Clay | (Belgium) Daphne van de Zande | 6–4, 3–6, 0–6 |

=== Doubles (5–7) ===
| Result | No. | Date | Tournament | Surface | Partner | Opponents | Score |
|---|---|---|---|---|---|---|---|
| Loss | 1. | 5 May 1997 | Nitra, Slovakia | Clay | (Slovakia) Gabriela Voleková | (Czech Republic) Olga Blahotová (Czech Republic) Jana Macurová | 0–6, 6–0, 6–7^{(4)} |
| Loss | 2. | 11 January 1998 | San Antonio, US | Hard | (Slovakia) Silvia Uríčková | (South Africa) Kim Grant (United States) Mashona Washington | 6–4, 6–7, 2–6 |
| Win | 3. | 8 March 1998 | Büchen, Germany | Carpet (i) | (Czech Republic) Jana Ondrouchová | (Russia) Elena Dementieva (Poland) Anna Bieleń-Żarska | 7–6, 6–1 |
| Win | 4. | 15 November 1998 | Suzano, Brazil | Clay | (Slovakia) Silvia Uríčková | (Italy) Laura dell'Angelo (Italy) Antonella Serra Zanetti | 3–6, 6–2, 6–4 |
| Win | 5. | 22 November 1998 | São Paulo, Brazil | Clay | (Slovakia) Silvia Uríčková | (United States) Tiffany Dabek (Ukraine) Yulia Mirna | 6–0, 6–2 |
| Loss | 6. | 20 June 1998 | Istanbul, Turkey | Hard | (Czech Republic) Magdalena Zděnovcová | (Italy) Giulia Casoni (Germany) Kirstin Freye | 3–6, 3–6 |
| Loss | 7. | 19 July 1999 | Brussels, Belgium | Clay | (Slovakia) Silvia Uríčková | (Czech Republic) Olga Blahotová (Czech Republic) Gabriela Chmelinová | 3–6, 0–6 |
| Loss | 8. | 26 September 1999 | Horb, Germany | Clay | (Slovakia) Eva Fislová | (New Zealand) Rewa Hudson (Italy) Mara Santangelo | 2–6, 2–6 |
| Loss | 9. | 22 August 1999 | Maribor, Slovenia | Clay | (Slovakia) Silvia Uríčková | (Czech Republic) Olga Blahotová (Czech Republic) Hana Šromová | 4–6, 3–6 |
| Win | 10. | 23 August 1999 | Skiathos, Greece | Clay | (San Marino) Francesca Guardigli | (Austria) Nicole Melch (United Kingdom) Nicola Payne | 6–4, 6–4 |
| Win | 11. | 19 September 1999 | Otočec, Slovenia | Clay | (Slovakia) Ľudmila Cervanová | (Germany) Syna Schmidle (Austria) Melanie Schnell | 6–3, 6–4 |
| Loss | 12. | 7 February 2000 | Mallorca, Spain | Clay | (Slovakia) Alena Paulenková | (Czech Republic) Gabriela Chmelinová (Czech Republic) Jana Macurová | 2–6, 1–6 |
