= Gabriela Voleková =

Slovak tennis player

- Country (sports): Slovakia
- Born: 10 March 1981 (age 44) Bratislava, Czechoslovakia
- Retired: 2005
- Prize money: $58,127

Singles
- Career record: 111–104
- Highest ranking: No. 191 (19 November 2001)

Grand Slam singles results
- Australian Open: Q1 (2002)
- US Open: Q1 (2001, 2003)

Doubles
- Career record: 84–70
- Career titles: 3 ITF
- Highest ranking: No. 180 (10 July 2000)

Gabriela Voleková (Slovak pronunciation: [ˈɡabrɪela ˈʋɔlekɔʋaː]; born 10 March 1981) is a former professional Slovak tennis player.

Voleková won three doubles titles on the ITF Women's Circuit in her career. On 19 November 2001, she reached her best singles ranking of world No. 191. On 10 July 2000, she peaked at No. 180 in the doubles rankings.

== ITF finals ==
=== Singles (0–9) ===
Legend $100,000 tournaments $75,000 tournaments $50,000 tournaments $25,000 tournaments $10,000 tournaments	Finals by surface Hard (0–2) Clay (0–7)

Result	No.	Date	Tournament	Surface	Opponent	Score
Loss	1.	7 December 1998	Ismaïlia, Egypt	Clay	(Georgia (country)) Nino Louarsabishvili	6–1, 2–6, 5–7
Loss	2.	2 August 1999	Caracas, Venezuela	Hard	(Switzerland) Aliénor Tricerri	1–6, 2–6
Loss	3.	31 July 2000	Guayaquil, Ecuador	Clay	(Portugal) Helga Vieira	1–6, 6–7^{(5–7)}
Loss	4.	14 August 2000	Cuernavaca, Mexico	Clay	(United States) Stephanie Mabry	2–6, 1–6
Loss	5.	2 October 2000	Hallandale Beach, United States	Clay	(United States) Tiffany Dabek	3–5, 5–2, 2–4, 5–3, 2–4
Loss	6.	16 April 2001	Coatzacoalcos, Mexico	Hard	(Italy) Maria Elena Camerin	1–6, 3–6
Loss	7.	23 April 2001	Jackson, United States	Clay	(Kazakhstan) Irina Selyutina	1–6, 4–6
Loss	8.	3 July 2001	Stuttgart-Vaihingen, Germany	Clay	(Argentina) Vanesa Krauth	1–6, 3–6
Loss	9.	5 November 2001	Cairo, Egypt	Clay	(Morocco) Bahia Mouhtassine	6–1, 3–6, 5–7

=== Doubles (3–10) ===
Legend $25,000 tournaments $10,000 tournaments	Finals by surface Hard (1–3) Clay (2–7)

Result	No.	Date	Tournament	Surface	Partner	Opponents	Score
Loss	1.	6 May 1996	Nitra, Slovakia	Clay	(Slovakia) Zuzana Váleková	(Bulgaria) Teodora Nedeva (Belarus) Vera Zhukovets	w/o
Loss	2.	5 May 1997	Nitra, Slovakia	Clay	(Slovakia) Andrea Šebová	(Czech Republic) Olga Blahotová (Czech Republic) Jana Macurová	0–6, 6–0, 6–7^{(4–7)}
Loss	3.	6 April 1998	Brindisi, Italy	Clay	(Slovakia) Alena Paulenková	(Italy) Flavia Pennetta (Italy) Roberta Vinci	4–6, 6–7^{(5–7)}
Loss	4.	7 December 1998	Ismaïlia, Egypt	Clay	(Federal Republic of Yugoslavia) Ljiljana Nanušević	(Georgia (country)) Nino Louarsabishvili (Morocco) Bahia Mouhtassine	3–6, 3–6
Loss	5.	14 June 1999	Poznań, Poland	Clay	(Slovakia) Eva Fislová	(Slovakia) Katarína Bašternáková (Slovakia) Stanislava Hrozenská	3–6, 5–7
Loss	6.	2 August 1999	Caracas, Venezuela	Hard	(Switzerland) Aliénor Tricerri	(Argentina) Melisa Arévalo (Colombia) Mariana Mesa	5–7, 6–7^{(1–7)}
Win	1.	30 August 1999	Querétaro, Mexico	Clay	(Venezuela) Milagros Sequera	(Brazil) Joana Cortez (Brazil) Carla Tiene	4–6, 6–3, 6–4
Win	2.	1 May 2000	Coatzacoalcos, Mexico	Hard	(Venezuela) Milagros Sequera	(Brazil) Joana Cortez (Brazil) Miriam D'Agostini	4–6, 6–3, 7–5
Loss	7.	5 June 2000	Hilton Head, United States	Hard	(Venezuela) Milagros Sequera	(United States) Wendy Fix (India) Manisha Malhotra	4–6, 6–7^{(3–7)}
Loss	8.	24 July 2000	Caracas, Venezuela	Hard	(Ecuador) Candice de la Torre	(Venezuela) María Virginia Francesa (Venezuela) María Vento-Kabchi	1–6, 4–6
Win	3.	31 July 2000	Guayaquil, Ecuador	Clay	(Ecuador) Candice de la Torre	(Brazil) Marcela Evangelista (Brazil) Priscila Ortega	6–4, 6–2
Loss	9.	1 May 2001	Dothan, United States	Clay	(Russia) Alina Jidkova	(United States) Marissa Irvin (Chinese Taipei) Janet Lee	0–6, 2–6
Loss	10.	5 November 2001	Cairo, Egypt	Clay	(Czech Republic) Zuzana Hejdová	(Czech Republic) Milena Nekvapilová (Czech Republic) Hana Šromová	3–6, 2–6
