= Denisa Chládková =

Czech tennis player (born 1979)

- Country (sports): Czech Republic
- Residence: Prague, Czech Republic
- Born: 8 February 1979 (age 46); Prague, Czechoslovakia
- Height: 1.74 m (5 ft 9 in)
- Turned pro: 1997
- Retired: 2006
- Plays: Right-handed (two-handed backhand)
- Prize money: $1,343,285

Singles
- Career record: 303–246
- Career titles: 7 ITF
- Highest ranking: 31 (16 June 2003)

Grand Slam singles results
- Australian Open: 4R (2003)
- French Open: 3R (2001)
- Wimbledon: QF (1997)
- US Open: 2R (1997, 2001, 2002, 2003)

Doubles
- Career record: 52–61
- Career titles: 4 ITF
- Highest ranking: 74 (9 January 2006)

Grand Slam doubles results
- Australian Open: 2R (2005)
- French Open: 3R (2004)
- Wimbledon: 2R (2005)
- US Open: 2R (2005)

Denisa Chládková (born 8 February 1979) is a Czech former professional tennis player.

== Life and career ==
Chládková did not win any WTA Tour titles, but she is probably best remembered for reaching the Wimbledon quarterfinals in 1997, playing in only her third Grand Slam main draw. After defeating Sandra Kleinová in the first round she stunned Lindsay Davenport in the second round, for the first top-ten win of her career. She then defeated Radka Zrubáková and María Vento-Kabchi before eventually losing to the champion, Martina Hingis.

Despite not winning any titles, she reached WTA Tour singles finals. The biggest of these was at the Tier-II event held in Hanover, Germany, where she lost to Serena Williams. She also finished runner-up at Knokke-Heist, losing to María Sánchez Lorenzo and Helsinki, losing to Svetlana Kuznetsova.

On 16 June 2003, she ascended to her career-high ranking of No. 31 in the world. That same year she advanced to the fourth round of the Australian Open, her best Grand Slam result since her memorable Wimbledon quarterfinal run six years previously.

During her career, she had wins over Lindsay Davenport, Barbara Schett, Anke Huber, Chanda Rubin, Silvia Farina Elia, Tamarine Tanasugarn and Magdalena Maleeva.

== WTA career finals ==
=== Singles: 3 (runner-ups) ===
Legend Grand Slam tournaments (0–0) Tier I (0–0) Tier II (0–1) Tier III, IV & V (0–2)	Finals by surface Hard (0–1) Grass (0–0) Clay (0–2) Carpet (0–0)

Result	W/L	Date	Tournament	Surface	Opponent	Score
Loss	0–1	Aug 1999	French Community Championships, Belgium	Clay	(Spain) María Sánchez Lorenzo	7–6, 4–6, 2–6
Loss	0–2	Feb 2000	Faber Grand Prix, Germany	Hard	(United States) Serena Williams	1–6, 1–6
Loss	0–3	Aug 2002	Nordic Light Open, Finland	Clay	(Russia) Svetlana Kuznetsova	6–0, 3–6, 6–7^{(2–7)}

== ITF finals ==
$75,000 tournaments
$50,000 tournaments
$25,000 tournaments
$10,000 tournaments

=== Singles (7–2) ===
Result	No.	Date	Tournament	Surface	Opponent	Score
Win	1.	30 April 1995	ITF Edinburgh, United Kingdom	Clay	(France) Karolina Jagieniak	6–2, 6–2
Win	2.	14 May 1995	ITF Edinburgh, United Kingdom	Clay	(Austria) Christina Habernigg	6–2, 4–6, 6–3
Win	3.	14 July 1995	ITF Puchheim, Germany	Clay	(Germany) Sandra Klösel	6–3, 5–7, 7–6
Win	4.	11 August 1996	ITF Sopot, Poland	Clay	(Czech Republic) Eva Martincová	6–3, 6–4
Win	5.	3 November 1996	ITF Edinburgh, United Kingdom	Hard (i)	(Switzerland) Emanuela Zardo	7–6, 6–0
Loss	6.	10 August 1997	ITF Sopot, Poland	Clay	(Poland) Magdalena Grzybowska	3–6, 2–6
Win	7.	13 September 1998	ITF Edinburgh, United Kingdom	Clay	(United Kingdom) Joanne Ward	6–3, 6–2
Loss	8.	28 September 1998	ITF Thessaloniki, Greece	Clay	(Hungary) Rita Kuti-Kis	6–1, 1–6, 1–6
Win	9.	21 July 2002	ITF Modena, Italy	Clay	(Russia) Evgenia Kulikovskaya	6–2, 6–3

=== Doubles (4–2) ===
Result	No.	Date	Tournament	Surface	Partner	Opponents	Score
Win	1.	11 December 1994	ITF Vítkovice, Czech Republic	Hard (i)	(Czech Republic) Sandra Kleinová	(Czech Republic) Jindra Gabrišová (Czech Republic) Dominika Gorecká	6–4, 0–6, 7–6
Win	2.	3 April 1994	ITF Athens, Greece	Clay	(Slovakia) Patrícia Marková	(United States) Corina Morariu (Greece) Christina Zachariadou	6–2, 7–5
Loss	3.	14 August 1995	ITF Carthage, Tunisia	Clay	(Belgium) Daphne van de Zande	(United States) Corina Morariu (Greece) Christina Zachariadou	4–6, 6–7^{(7)}
Win	4.	4 March 1996	ITF Prostějov, Czech Republic	Hard (i)	(Czech Republic) Helena Vildová	(Bulgaria) Svetlana Krivencheva (Ukraine) Olga Lugina	7–6^{(5)}, 4–6, 7–5
Win	5.	17 June 1996	ITF Bytom, Poland	Clay	(Czech Republic) Radka Pelikánová	(Czech Republic) Eva Martincová (Czech Republic) Lenka Němečková	7–6^{(0)}, 6–4
Loss	6.	22 July 1996	ITF Rostock, Germany	Clay	(Czech Republic) Eva Martincová	(Austria) Elisabeth Habeler (Poland) Katarzyna Teodorowicz-Lisowska	4–6, 6–4, 1–6

== Grand Slam singles performance timeline ==
Key
W	F	SF	QF	#R	RR	Q#	DNQ	A	NH

(W) winner; (F) finalist; (SF) semifinalist; (QF) quarterfinalist; (#R) rounds 4, 3, 2, 1; (RR) round-robin stage; (Q#) qualification round; (DNQ) did not qualify; (A) absent; (NH) not held; (SR) strike rate (events won / competed); (W–L) win–loss record.

Tournament	1997	1998	1999	2000	2001	2002	2003	2004	2005	W–L
Australian Open	1R	1R	1R	2R	3R	1R	4R	2R	2R	8–9
French Open	1R	1R	1R	2R	3R	1R	2R	3R	1R	6–9
Wimbledon	QF	1R	1R	1R	1R	2R	2R	3R	1R	8–9
US Open	2R	A	1R	1R	2R	2R	2R	1R	1R	4–8
Win–loss	5–4	0–3	0–4	2–4	5–4	2–4	6–4	5–4	1–4	26–35
