= Miriam Oremans =

Dutch tennis player (born 1972)

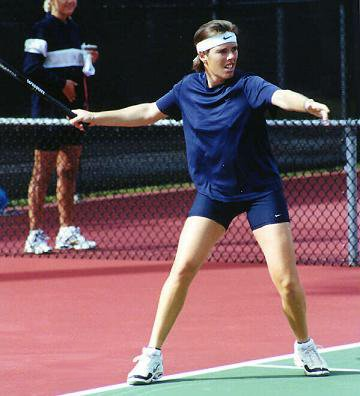
- Country (sports): Netherlands
- Born: 9 September 1974 (age 51) Berlicum, The Netherlands
- Height: 1.69 m (5 ft 6 1/2 in)
- Turned pro: 1997
- Retired: 2002
- Plays: Right-handed (one-handed backhand)
- Prize money: US$ 1,648,499

Singles
- Career record: 182–205
- Career titles: 0
- Highest ranking: No. 25 (26 July 1993)

Doubles
- Career record: 195–187
- Career titles: 3
- Highest ranking: No. 19 (7 July 1997)

Other doubles tournaments

Grand Slam mixed doubles results
- Wimbledon: F (1992)
Medal record
Olympic Games
Silver medal – second place	2000 Sydney	Doubles

Miriam Oremans (born 9 September 1972) is a former professional female tennis player from the Netherlands. On 26 July 1993 she reached her career-high singles ranking of number 25.

She did not win any singles titles (Oremans did have two Satellite tournament wins in 1989), but did win three titles in doubles. In 1992 she was runner-up together with Jacco Eltingh in the mixed doubles finals of Wimbledon.

Her biggest achievement came during the 2000 Summer Olympics in Sydney where she won the silver medal in doubles, partnering Kristie Boogert, losing the final match to Venus and Serena Williams.

== Major finals ==
=== Grand Slam finals ===
==== Mixed doubles: 1 (0–1) ====
Result	Year	Championship	Surface	Partner	Opponents	Score
Loss	1992	Wimbledon	Grass	(Netherlands) Jacco Eltingh	(Czech Republic) Cyril Suk (Latvia) Larisa Neiland	6–7^{(2–7)}, 2–6

=== Olympic finals ===
==== Doubles: 1 (0–1) ====
Result	Year	Championship	Surface	Partner	Opponents	Score
Silver	2000	Sydney	Hard	(Netherlands) Kristie Boogert	(United States) Serena Williams (United States) Venus Williams	1–6, 1–6

== WTA Tour finals ==
=== Singles 5 ===
Legend
Grand Slam	0
WTA Championships	0
Tier I	0
Tier II	0
Tier III	0
Tier IV & V	0

Result	W–L	Date	Tournament	Surface	Opponent	Score
Loss	0–1	Jun 1993	Eastbourne, England	Grass	(United States) Martina Navratilova	6–2, 2–6, 3–6
Loss	0–2	Jun 1997	Rosmalen, Netherlands	Grass	(Romania) Ruxandra Dragomir	7–5, 2–6, 4–6
Loss	0–3	Jun 1998	's-Hertogenbosch, Netherlands	Grass	(France) Julie Halard-Decugis	3–6, 4–6
Loss	0–4	Oct 2000	Bratislava, Slovakia	Hard (i)	(Czech Republic) Dája Bedáňová	1–6, 7–5, 3–6
Loss	0–5	Jun 2001	Birmingham, England	Grass	(France) Nathalie Tauziat	3–6, 5–7

=== Doubles 12 (3–9) ===
Legend
Grand Slam	0
WTA Championships	0
Tier I	0
Tier II	1
Tier III	1
Tier IV & V	1
Olympic Games	0

Titles by surface
Hard	1
Clay	0
Grass	1
Carpet	1

Result	W–L	Date	Tournament	Surface	Partners	Opponents	Score
Win	1–0	Feb 1992	Linz, Austria	Hard (i)	(Netherlands) Monique Kiene	(Germany) Claudia Porwik (Italy) Raffaella Reggi-Concato	6–4, 6–2
Loss	1–1	May 1995	Strasbourg, France	Hard (i)	(Belgium) Sabine Appelmans	(United States) Lindsay Davenport (United States) Mary Joe Fernández	2–6, 3–6
Loss	1–2	May 1996	Madrid, Spain	Clay	(Belgium) Sabine Appelmans	(Czech Republic) Jana Novotná (Spain) Arantxa Sánchez Vicario	6–7, 2–6
Loss	1–3	Oct 1996	Leipzig, Germany	Carpet	(Belgium) Sabine Appelmans	(Netherlands) Kristie Boogert (France) Nathalie Tauziat	4–6, 4–6
Loss	1–4	Mar 1997	Key Biscayne, Florida, USA	Hard	(Belgium) Sabine Appelmans	(Spain) Arantxa Sánchez Vicario (Belarus) Natasha Zvereva	2–6, 3–6
Win	2–4	Feb 1998	Paris, France	Carpet (i)	(Belgium) Sabine Appelmans	(Russia) Anna Kournikova (Latvia) Larisa Neiland	1–6, 6–3, 7–6^{(7–3)}
Win	3–4	Jun 1998	's-Hertogenbosch, Netherlands	Grass	(Belgium) Sabine Appelmans	(Romania) Cătălina Cristea (Czech Republic) Eva Melicharová	6–7^{(4–7)}, 7–6^{(8–6)}, 7–6^{(7–5)}
Loss	3–5	Oct 2000	Sydney Olympics, Australia	Hard	(Netherlands) Kristie Boogert	(United States) Venus Williams (United States) Serena Williams	1–6, 1–6
Loss	3–6	Feb 2001	Doha, Qatar	Hard	(Netherlands) Kristie Boogert	(France) Sandrine Testud (Italy) Roberta Vinci	5–7, 6–7^{(4–7)}
Loss	3–7	May 2001	Antwerp, Belgium	Clay	(Netherlands) Kristie Boogert	(Belgium) Els Callens (Spain) Virginia Ruano Pascual	3–6, 6–3, 4–6
Loss	3–8	Jun 2001	's-Hertogenbosch, Netherlands	Grass	(Belgium) Kim Clijsters	(Romania) Ruxandra Dragomir (Russia) Nadia Petrova	6–7^{(5–7)}, 7–6^{(7–5)}, 4–6
Loss	3–9	Dec 2001	Gold Coast, Australia	Hard	(Sweden) Åsa Svensson	(United States) Meghann Shaughnessy (Belgium) Justine Henin	1–6, 6–7^{(6–8)}

== ITF finals ==
=== Singles: (2-2) ===
$100,000 tournaments
$75,000 tournaments
$50,000 tournaments
$25,000 tournaments
$10,000 tournaments

Result	No.	Date	Tournament	Surface	Opponent	Score
Win	1.	6 November 1989	Ashkelon, Israel	Clay	(South Africa) Robyn Field	6–4, 7–5
Win	2.	13 November 1989	Jerusalem, Israel	Clay	(Israel) Yael Segal	7–-5, 6–4
Loss	3.	14 May 1990	Jaffa, Israel	Hard	(Israel) Limor Zaltz	6–7, 6–3, 2–6
Loss	4.	12 November 1990	Ashkelon, Israel	Hard	(Netherlands) Nicolette Rooimans	6–3, 4–6, 6–7^{(5–7)}

=== Doubles: (1-2) ===
Result	No	Date	Tournament	Surface	Partner	Opponents	Score
Loss	1.	14 May 1990	Jaffa, Israel	Hard	(Netherlands) Nicolette Rooimans	(South Africa) Michelle Anderson (South Africa) Robyn Field	5–7, 4–6
Loss	2.	11 June 1990	Modena, Italy	Hard	(Netherlands) Heleen van den Berg	(Italy) Silvia Farina Elia (Italy) Simona Isidori	2–6, 3–6
Win	3.	7 December 1997	Cergy-Pontoise, France	Hard (i)	(Netherlands) Kristie Boogert	(France) Julie Halard-Decugis (France) Anne-Gaëlle Sidot	7–5, 6–4
