= Radka Pelikánová =

Czech tennis player

- Full name: Radka Kocandová-Pelikánová
- Country (sports): Czech Republic; Czechoslovakia
- Born: 3 July 1977 (age 47)
- Retired: 2001
- Prize money: $74,463

Singles
- Career record: 163–139
- Career titles: 1 ITF
- Highest ranking: No. 180 (28 September 1998)

Doubles
- Career record: 58–70
- Career titles: 1 ITF
- Highest ranking: No. 166 (20 September 1999)

Radka Kocandová (born 3 July 1977) is a Czech former professional tennis player.

== Biography ==
Pelikánová, as she was originally known, began competing professionally in 1992.

She reached a best singles ranking of 180, with her best WTA Tour performance coming at the 1995 Prague Open, where she had a win over world number 62 Linda Harvey-Wild. During her career she featured in the qualifying draw at the US Open on three occasions.

As a doubles player she was ranked as high as 166 and won one ITF $25,000 title.

Since retiring she has coached tennis in Prague.

== ITF finals ==
=== Singles (1–1) ===
Legend
$50,000 tournaments
$25,000 tournaments
$10,000 tournaments

Result	No.	Date	Tournament	Surface	Opponent	Score
Loss	1.	8 February 1999	Rogaška Slatina, Slovenia	Carpet	(Czech Republic) Renata Kučerová	6–7, 3–6
Win	2.	21 February 2000	Büchen, Germany	Carpet	(Czech Republic) Zuzana Ondrášková	6–3, 7–5

=== Doubles (1–3) ===
Result	No.	Date	Tournament	Surface	Partner	Opponents	Score
Loss	1.	11 September 1995	Karlovy Vary, Czech Republic	Clay	(Hungary) Andrea Noszály	(Slovakia) Simona Galiková (Czech Republic) Květa Peschke	3–6, 4–6
Win	2.	17 June 1996	Bytom, Poland	Clay	(Czech Republic) Denisa Chládková	(Czech Republic) Eva Martincová (Czech Republic) Lenka Němečková	7–6^{(0)}, 6–4
Loss	3.	1 November 1998	Poitiers, France	Hard (i)	(Germany) Gabriela Kučerová	(Russia) Olga Lugina (Russia) Elena Makarova	0–6, 1–6
Loss	4.	21 June 1999	Vaihingen, Germany	Clay	(Czech Republic) Ludmila Richterová	(Austria) Patricia Wartusch (Germany) Jasmin Wöhr	1–6, 6–7
