= Dája Bedáňová =

Czech tennis player

- Country (sports): Czech Republic
- Residence: Leonberg, Germany
- Born: 9 March 1983 (age 42); Ostrava, Czechoslovakia
- Height: 1.71 m (5 ft 7 in)
- Turned pro: 2000
- Retired: 2005
- Plays: Right-handed (two-handed backhand)
- Prize money: US$902,005

Singles
- Career record: 138–109
- Career titles: 1
- Highest ranking: No. 16 (29 July 2002)

Grand Slam singles results
- Australian Open: 4R (2001)
- French Open: 3R (2001)
- Wimbledon: 3R (2002)
- US Open: QF (2001)

Doubles
- Career record: 59–64
- Career titles: 1
- Highest ranking: No. 34 (10 June 2002)

Dája Bedáňová (born Daniela Bedáňová 9 March 1983) is a former professional tennis player from the Czech Republic. She lives in Leonberg, Germany. Bedáňová turned pro in 2000 and retired in 2005.

She was named the WTA Newcomer of the Year in 2000. Her best performance at a Grand Slam tournament came when she got to the quarterfinals of the 2001 US Open, defeating Joannette Kruger, Silvija Talaja, Meghann Shaughnessy and Monica Seles, then losing to Martina Hingis. She attained a career high ranking of 16 in singles in 2002.

== Performance timelines ==
Key
W	F	SF	QF	#R	RR	Q#	P#	DNQ	A	Z#	PO	G	S	B	NMS	NTI	P	NH

(W) winner; (F) finalist; (SF) semifinalist; (QF) quarterfinalist; (#R) rounds 4, 3, 2, 1; (RR) round-robin stage; (Q#) qualification round; (P#) preliminary round; (DNQ) did not qualify; (A) absent; (Z#) Davis/Fed Cup Zonal Group (with number indication) or (PO) play-off; (G) gold, (S) silver or (B) bronze Olympic/Paralympic medal; (NMS) not a Masters tournament; (NTI) not a Tier I tournament; (P) postponed; (NH) not held; (SR) strike rate (events won / competed); (W–L) win–loss record.
To avoid confusion and double counting, these charts are updated at the conclusion of a tournament or when the player's participation has ended.

Only main-draw results in WTA Tour, Grand Slam tournaments, Fed Cup and Olympic Games are included in win–loss records.

=== Singles ===
Tournament	1999	2000	2001	2002	2003	2004	2005	SR	W–L	Win%
Grand Slam tournamaents
Australian Open	A	A	4R	2R	2R	Q1	A	0 / 3	5–3	63%
French Open	A	Q2	3R	1R	1R	A	A	0 / 3	2–3	40%
Wimbledon	A	1R	1R	3R	2R	A	A	0 / 4	3–4	43%
US Open	A	1R	QF	4R	1R	A	A	0 / 4	7–4	64%
Win–loss	0–0	0–2	9–4	6–4	2–4	0–0	0–0	0 / 14	17–14	55%
National representation
Olympics	NH	2R	not held			A	NH	0 / 1	1–1	50%
Tier I tournaments
Indian Wells Open	A	2R	1R	3R	2R	A	2R	0 / 5	4–5	44%
Miami Open	A	2R	2R	2R	2R	A	Q1	0 / 4	3–4	43%
Berlin Open	A	A	A	2R	2R	A	A	0 / 2	2–2	50%
Canadian Open	A	A	3R	2R	Q2	A	A	0 / 2	3–2	60%
Pan Pacific Open	A	A	1R	1R	Q2	A	A	0 / 2	0–2	0%
Charleston Open	A	A	A	A	2R	A	A	0 / 1	1–1	50%
Kremlin Cup	A	A	QF	A	A	A	A	0 / 1	2–1	67%
Zurich Open	A	A	A	1R	A	A	A	0 / 1	0–1	0%
Win–loss	0–0	2–2	5–5	3–6	4–4	0–0	1–1	0 / 18	15–18	45%
Career statistics
Tournaments	1	10	20	25	15	0	2	Career total: 73		
Titles	0	1	0	0	0	0	0	Career total: 1		
Finals	0	1	0	0	0	0	0	Career total: 1		
Overall win-loss	1–1	13–10	20–20	24–24	6–16	0–0	1–2	1 / 73	65–73	47%

=== Doubles ===
Tournament	2000	2001	2002	2003	2004	SR	W–L	Win%
Grand Slam tournaments
Australian Open	A	A	QF	1R	1R	0 / 3	3–3	50%
French Open	A	A	3R	1R	A	0 / 2	2–2	50%
Wimbledon	A	A	1R	3R	A	0 / 2	2–2	50%
US Open	A	3R	1R	2R	A	0 / 3	3–3	50%
Win–loss	0–0	2–1	5–4	3–4	0–1	0 / 10	10–10	50%
National representation
Olympics	1R	not held			A	0 / 1	0–1	0%
Tier I tournaments
Indian Wells Open	A	A	QF	1R	A	0 / 2	2–2	50%
Miami Open	A	A	2R	2R	A	0 / 2	2–2	50%
Berlin Open	A	A	QF	A	A	0 / 1	2–1	67%
Canadian Open	A	Q1	1R	1R	A	0 / 2	0–2	0%
Charleston Open	A	A	A	2R	A	0 / 1	1–1	50%
Kremlin Cup	A	1R	A	A	A	0 / 1	0–1	0%
Pan Pacific Open	A	A	1R	1R	A	0 / 2	0–2	0%
Win–loss	0–0	0–1	5–5	2–5	0–0	0 / 11	7–11	39%

== WTA career finals ==
=== Singles: 1 title ===
Legend Tier IV (1–0)	Titles by surface Hard (1–0)

Result	W–L	Date	Tournament	Tier	Surface	Opponent	Score
Win	1–0	Oct 2000	WTA Bratislava, Slovakia	Tier IV	Hard (i)	(Netherlands) Miriam Oremans	6–1, 5–7, 6–3

=== Doubles: 2 (1 title, 1 runner-up) ===
Legend Tier V (1–1)	Titles by surface Hard (1–1)

Result	W–L	Date	Tournament	Tier	Surface	Partner	Opponents	Score
Win	1–0	Oct 2001	WTA Bratislava, Slovakia	Tier V	Hard (i)	(Russia) Elena Bovina	(France) Nathalie Dechy (United States) Meilen Tu	6–3, 6–4
Loss	1–1	Jan 2003	Canberra International, Australia	Tier V	Hard	(Russia) Dinara Safina	(Italy) Tathiana Garbin (France) Émilie Loit	3–6, 6–3, 4–6

== ITF finals ==
=== Singles: 1 title ===
Legend
$25,000 tournaments (1–0)

Result	W–L	Date	Tournament	Tier	Surface	Opponent	Score
Win	1–0	Feb 2000	ITF Rockford, United States	25,000	Hard (i)	(Italy) Francesca Schiavone	2–6, 6–3, 6–1

=== Doubles: 4 (2 titles, 2 runner-ups) ===
Legend
$75,000 tournaments (0–1)
$25,000 tournaments (1–0)
$10,000 tournaments (1–1)

Result	W–L	Date	Tournament	Tier	Surface	Partner	Opponents	Score
Loss	0–1	Nov 1998	ITF Bossonnens, Switzerland	10,000	Carpet (i)	(Czech Republic) Zuzana Ondrášková	(Czech Republic) Zuzana Hejdová (Czech Republic) Alena Vašková	4–6, 6–7^{(5–7)}
Win	1–1	Nov 1998	ITF Biel, Switzerland	10,000	Hard (i)	(Germany) Lydia Steinbach	(Germany) Gréta Arn (Hungary) Katalin Miskolczi	6–2, 6–1
Win	2–1	Jul 2001	ITF tuttgart-Vaihingen, Germany	25,000	Clay	(Czech Republic) Eva Martincová	(Germany) Gréta Arn (Australia) Amanda Grahame	0–6, 6–3, 6–3
Loss	2–2	Jun 2005	ITF Prostějov, Czech Republic	75,000	Clay	(Czech Republic) Barbora Strýcová	(Ukraine) Yuliya Beygelzimer (Italy) Mara Santangelo	1–6, 6–4, 2–6

== Best Grand Slam results details ==
Australian Open
2001 Australian Open
Round	Opponent	Score
1R	(Australia) Bryanne Stewart (WC)	7–5, 4–6, 7–5
2R	(Spain) Anabel Medina Garrigues	6–2, 4–6, 6–4
3R	(Russia) Elena Dementieva (9)	2–6, 7–6^{(7–5)}, 6–3
4R	(United States) Serena Williams (6)	2–6, 2–6

Wimbledon Championships
2002 Wimbledon (26th Seed)
Round	Opponent	Score
1R	(Netherlands) Seda Noorlander	6–1, 6–2
2R	(Tunisia) Selima Sfar	6–3, 6–2
3R	(United States) Jennifer Capriati (3)	4–6, 2–6

French Open
2001 French Open
Round	Opponent	Score
1R	(France) Stéphanie Foretz (WC)	7–5, 7–5
2R	(Germany) Andrea Glass	4–6, 7–5, 6–0
3R	(Italy) Silvia Farina Elia	5–7, 6–7^{(4–7)}

US Open
2001 US Open
Round	Opponent	Score
1R	(South Africa) Joannette Kruger	6–1, 6–2
2R	(Croatia) Silvija Talaja	6–1, 6–3
3R	(United States) Meghann Shaughnessy (12)	6–4, 6–1
4R	(United States) Monica Seles (7)	7–5, 4–6, 6–3
QF	(Switzerland) Martina Hingis (1)	2–6, 0–6

== Top 10 wins ==
No.	Player	Rk	Event	Surface	Rd	Score	Rk	Years
1	(France) Nathalie Tauziat	8	LA Championships, United States	Hard	1R	6–3, 6–4	113	2000
2	(United States) Monica Seles	8	US Open, United States	Hard	4R	7–5, 4–6, 6–3	37	2001
3	(France) Amélie Mauresmo	6	Kremlin Cup, Russia	Carpet	2R	6–2, 6–7^{(6–8)}, 6–4	28	2001
4	(Australia) Jelena Dokic	8	Eastbourne International, United Kingdom	Grass	2R	6–4, 1–6, 6–2	28	2002

Preceded by (Belgium) Kim Clijsters	WTA Newcomer of the Year; 2000	Succeeded by (Slovakia) Daniela Hantuchová
