= Eva Fislová =

Slovak tennis player

- Country (sports): Slovakia
- Born: 17 March 1981 (age 44); Považská Bystrica, Czechoslovakia
- Height: 1.80 m (5 ft 11 in)
- Turned pro: 1998
- Retired: 2009
- Prize money: $181,687

Singles
- Career record: 203–192
- Career titles: 1 ITF
- Highest ranking: No. 98 (11 August 2003)

Grand Slam singles results
- Australian Open: 1R (2003)
- French Open: Q2 (2004)
- Wimbledon: 2R (2003)
- US Open: 1R (2003)

Doubles
- Career record: 120–107
- Career titles: 6 ITF
- Highest ranking: No. 158 (13 September 2004)

Grand Slam doubles results
- Wimbledon: Q1 (2002)

Team competitions
- Fed Cup: 0–3

Eva Fislová (Slovak pronunciation: [ˈeʋa ˈfislɔʋaː]; born 17 March 1981) is a former professional Slovak tennis player.

She won one singles title and six doubles titles on the ITF Women's Circuit during her career. On 11 August 2003, she reached her best singles ranking of world No. 98. On 13 September 2004, she peaked at No. 158 in the doubles rankings.

Playing for Slovakia in Fed Cup competition, Fislová had a win–loss record of 0–3.

She retired from professional tennis 2009.

== ITF finals ==
=== Singles: 7 (1–6) ===
Legend $50,000 tournaments $25,000 tournaments $10,000 tournaments	Finals by surface Clay (1–5) Carpet (0–1)

Result	No.	Date	Tournament	Surface	Opponent	Score
Loss	1.	13 September 1999	ITF Biograd na Moru, Croatia	Clay	(Bosnia and Herzegovina) Mervana Jugić-Salkić	4–6, 2–6
Win	1.	27 March 2000	ITF Quartu Sant'Elena, Italy	Clay	(Spain) Laura Pena	4–6, 6–1, 7–5
Loss	2.	26 March 2001	ITF Bari, Italy	Clay	(Estonia) Margit Rüütel	6–3, 3–6, 1–6
Loss	3.	23 July 2001	ITF Civitanova, Italy	Clay	(Argentina) Gisela Dulko	6–2, 3–6, 3–6
Loss	4.	22 October 2001	ITF Opole, Poland	Carpet (i)	(Czech Republic) Iveta Benešová	1–6, 3–6
Loss	5.	29 September 2002	ITF Girona, Spain	Clay	(Slovakia) Ľubomíra Kurhajcová	3–6, 5–7
Loss	6.	4 July 2005	ITF Darmstadt, Germany	Clay	(Germany) Vanessa Henke	6–7^{(4)}, 1–6

=== Doubles: 18 (6–12) ===
Legend $25,000 tournaments $10,000 tournaments	Finals by surface Hard (0–2) Clay (6–10)

Result	No.	Date	Tournament	Surface	Partner	Opponents	Score
Loss	1.	14 June 1999	ITF Poznań, Poland	Clay	(Slovakia) Gabriela Voleková	(Slovakia) Katarína Bašternáková (Slovakia) Stanislava Hrozenská	3–6, 5–7
Loss	2.	26 September 1999	ITF Horb, Germany	Clay	(Slovakia) Andrea Šebová	(New Zealand) Rewa Hudson (Italy) Mara Santangelo	2–6, 2–6
Loss	3.	13 September 1999	ITF Biograd na Moru, Croatia	Clay	(Slovakia) Silvia Uríčková	(Netherlands) Natasha Galouza (Italy) Mara Santangelo	2–6, 2–6
Win	1.	15 May 2000	ITF Casale Monferrato, Italy	Clay	(France) Chloé Carlotti	(Romania) Magda Mihalache (Bulgaria) Biljana Pawlowa-Dimitrova	6–1, 6–4
Loss	4.	26 March 2001	ITF Bari, Italy	Clay	(Czech Republic) Zuzana Hejdová	(Germany) Julia Schruff (Germany) Rita Tarjan	6–3, 5–7, 4–6
Win	2.	7 May 2001	ITF Prešov, Slovakia	Clay	(Slovakia) Stanislava Hrozenská	(Czech Republic) Barbora Machovská (Czech Republic) Kristýna Pešatová	w/o
Loss	5.	23 April 2002	ITF Taranto, Italy	Clay	(Slovakia) Stanislava Hrozenská	(China) Yan Zi (China) Zheng Jie	2–6, 2–6
Loss	6.	5 August 2002	ITF Rimini, Italy	Clay	(Slovakia) Stanislava Hrozenská	(Brazil) Maria Fernanda Alves (Brazil) Carla Tiene	4–6, 4–6
Loss	7.	16 September 2002	ITF Luxembourg	Clay	(Slovakia) Ľubomíra Kurhajcová	(Czech Republic) Eva Martincová (Czech Republic) Lenka Němečková	1–6, 4–6
Win	3.	26 July 2004	ITF Pétange, Luxembourg	Clay	(Slovakia) Stanislava Hrozenská	(Australia) Evie Dominikovic (Russia) Goulnara Fattakhetdinova	6–4, 6–3
Win	4.	3 August 2004	Ladies Open Hechingen, Germany	Clay	(Slovakia) Stanislava Hrozenská	(Argentina) Erica Krauth (Germany) Jasmin Wöhr	3–6, 6–3, 6–3
Loss	8.	12 October 2004	ITF Sunderland, United Kingdom	Hard (i)	(Slovakia) Stanislava Hrozenská	(United Kingdom) Elena Baltacha (United Kingdom) Jane O'Donoghue	1–6, 6–4, 2–6
Loss	9.	1 November 2004	ITF Sint-Katelijne-Waver, Belgium	Hard (i)	(Slovakia) Stanislava Hrozenská	(France) Virginie Pichet (Tunisia) Selima Sfar	1–6, 6–7^{(2)}
Loss	10.	21 June 2005	ITF Fontanafredda, Italy	Clay	(Slovakia) Stanislava Hrozenská	(Bosnia and Herzegovina) Mervana Jugić-Salkić (Croatia) Darija Jurak	7–5, 3–6, 4–6
Loss	11.	3 July 2006	ITF Stuttgart, Germany	Clay	(Slovakia) Stanislava Hrozenská	(Romania) Monica Niculescu (Czech Republic) Renata Voráčová	2–6, 7–6^{(4)}, 5–7
Win	5.	7 August 2006	Ladies Open Hechingen, Germany	Clay	(Slovakia) Stanislava Hrozenská	(Ukraine) Kristina Antoniychuk (Romania) Raluca Olaru	6–3, 6–7^{(3)}, 6–3
Win	6.	15 August 2006	ITF Bratislava, Slovakia	Clay	(Slovakia) Stanislava Hrozenská	(Romania) Diana Enache (Germany) Maren Kassens	6–2, 6–2
Loss	12.	18 August 2008	ITF Vinkovci, Croatia	Clay	(Slovakia) Andrea Rebrová	(Slovakia) Katarína Poljaková (Slovakia) Zuzana Zlochová	4–6, 5–7
