= Olga Barabanschikova =

Belarusian tennis player (born 1979)

- Native name: Вольга Барабаншчыкава
- Country (sports): Belarus
- Residence: London, England and Minsk, Belarus
- Born: 2 November 1979 (age 46) Minsk, Soviet Union
- Turned pro: 1995
- Retired: 2008
- Plays: Right-handed (two-handed backhand)
- Prize money: $548,692

Singles
- Career record: 201–174
- Career titles: 0 WTA, 3 ITF
- Highest ranking: No. 49 (2 March 1998)

Grand Slam singles results
- Australian Open: 3R (1998)
- French Open: 2R (1999)
- Wimbledon: 4R (2000)
- US Open: 3R (1997)

Doubles
- Career record: 70–84
- Career titles: 0 WTA, 4 ITF
- Highest ranking: No. 81 (19 October 1998)

Grand Slam doubles results
- Australian Open: 1R (1998, 2000)
- French Open: 1R (1998, 1999)
- Wimbledon: 2R (1998, 1999)
- US Open: 1R (1998)
- Last updated on: 17 November 2010.

Olga Barabanschikova (Belarusian: Вольга Барабаншчыкава; Russian: Ольга Барабанщикова; born 2 November 1979) is a former professional Belarusian tennis player.

Barabanschikova's highest WTA singles ranking is 49th, which she reached on 2 March 1998. Her career high in doubles was at 81 set at 19 October 1998. Barabanschikova was also a spokesperson in the final of the Eurovision Song Contest 2008, announcing the televotes of Belarus.

Barabanschikova was born in Minsk. She married her longtime domestic partner, Luanne, in 2008. They currently reside between Los Angeles, CA and Europe.

== Major finals ==
=== Olympic finals ===
==== Doubles: 1 (0–1) ====
Result	Year	Championship	Surface	Partner	Opponents	Score
4th place	2000	Sydney	Hard	(Belarus) Natalia Zvereva	(Belgium) Els Callens (Belgium) Dominique Monami	6–4, 4–6, 1–6

== WTA Tour finals ==
=== Singles: 1 (0–1) ===
Legend: Before 2009	Legend: Starting in 2009
Grand Slam tournaments (0)
WTA Championships (0)
Tier I (0)	Premier Mandatory (0)
Tier II (0)	Premier 5 (0)
Tier III (0)	Premier (0)
Tier IV & V (0)	International (0)

Result	W/L	Date	Tournament	Surface	Opponent	Score
Loss	0–1	Aug 1998	Istanbul, Turkey	Hard	(Slovakia) Henrieta Nagyová	4–6, 6–3, 6–7^{(9–11)}

=== Doubles: 1 (0–1) ===
Legend: Before 2009	Legend: Starting in 2009
Grand Slam tournaments (0)
WTA Championships (0)
Tier I (0)	Premier Mandatory (0)
Tier II (0)	Premier 5 (0)
Tier III (0)	Premier (0)
Tier IV & V (0)	International (0)

Result	W/L	Date	Tournament	Surface	Partner	Opponents	Score
Loss	0–1	Oct 1999	Bratislava, Slovakia	Hard (i)	(United States) Lilia Osterloh	(Belgium) Kim Clijsters (Belgium) Laurence Courtois	2–6, 6–3, 5–7

== ITF Circuit finals ==
$100,000 tournaments
$75,000 tournaments
$50,000 tournaments
$25,000 tournaments
$10,000 tournaments

=== Singles finals: 7 (3–4) ===
Result	No.	Date	Tournament	Surface	Opponent	Score
Loss	1.	23 January 1995	Pontevedra, Spain	Hard	(Spain) Paula Hermida	1–6, 7–6^{(7–5)}, 4–6
Win	1.	23 October 1995	Poitiers, France	Hard	(Ukraine) Elena Tatarkova	6–3, 6–1
Loss	2.	5 August 1996	Austin, United States	Hard	(United States) Jane Chi	2–6, 6–4, 2–6
Win	2.	24 February 1997	Bushey, United Kingdom	Carpet	(Romania) Raluca Sandu	6–1, 7–6^{(8–6)}
Loss	3.	20 October 2002	Southampton, United Kingdom	Hard (i)	(Sweden) Sofia Arvidsson	2–6, 6–1, 4–6
Win	3.	27 October 2002	Opole, Poland	Carpet	(Russia) Anna Bastrikova	2–6, 6–3, 6–3
Loss	4.	23 February 2003	Redbridge, United Kingdom	Hard	(Croatia) Karolina Šprem	3–6, 2–6

=== Doubles finals: 7 (4–3) ===
Result	No.	Date	Tournament	Surface	Partner	Opponents	Score
Loss	1.	16 January 1995	Ourense, Spain	Hard	(Spain) Paula Hermida	(Netherlands) Stephanie Gomperts (Netherlands) Henriëtte van Aalderen	5–7, 1–6
Win	2.	23 January 1995	Pontevedra, Spain	Hard	(Spain) Paula Hermida	(Italy) Katia Altilia (France) Stephanie Content	6–3, 6–3
Loss	3.	19 May 1996	Bordeaux, France	Clay	(Italy) Alice Canepa	(France) Karine Quentrec (France) Anne-Gaëlle Sidot	2–6, 3–6
Win	4.	28 October 1996	Poitiers, France	Hard (i)	(India) Nirupama Sanjeev	(Netherlands) Anique Snijders (France) Noëlle van Lottum	6–2, 6–3
Loss	5.	15 February 1998	Midland, United States	Hard (i)	(United States) Erika deLone	(Australia) Catherine Barclay (Australia) Kerry-Anne Guse	2–6, 4–6
Winner	6.	11 February 2003	Southampton, United Kingdom	Hard (i)	(Belarus) Nadejda Ostrovskaya	(Italy) Giulia Casoni (Italy) Roberta Vinci	6–3, 6–4
Winner	7.	18 February 2003	Redbridge, United Kingdom	Hard (i)	(Belarus) Nadejda Ostrovskaya	(Serbia and Montenegro) Katarina Mišić (Serbia and Montenegro) Dragana Zarić	6–4, 1–6, 7–5
