= WTA Bratislava =

Defunct tennis tournament
- Tour: WTA Tour
- Founded: 1999
- Abolished: 2002
- Editions: 4
- Location: Bratislava, Slovakia
- Venue: Incheba
- Category: Tier IV (1999–2000); Tier V (2001–2002)
- Surface: Hard / indoor

The WTA Bratislava was a women's tennis tournament held in Bratislava, Slovakia, from 1999 until 2002. The tournament was a Tier IVa and V event on the WTA Tour. It was held in October and played on indoor hard courts at the Incheba expo centre. Amélie Mauresmo won her first career title in the inaugural event, defeating another future world No. 1, Kim Clijsters.

== History ==
The tournament was first held in 1999 as the Eurotel Slovak Open. It was renamed the Eurotel Slovak Indoor in 2000 and the Eurotel Slovak Indoors in 2001, and its last edition in 2002 was called the VUB Open. Each edition had prize money of $110,000. In the 1999 final, top seed Mauresmo, then aged 20, beat the 16-year-old Clijsters 6–3, 6–3. It was the first of 15 matches between the two players. In 2002, Maja Matevžič won both the singles and the doubles titles, the latter with Henrieta Nagyová.

== Past finals ==
=== Singles ===
Date	Champion	Runner-up	Score
1999	(France) Amélie Mauresmo	(Belgium) Kim Clijsters	6–3, 6–3
2000	(Czech Republic) Dája Bedáňová	(Netherlands) Miriam Oremans	6–1, 5–7, 6–3
2001	(Italy) Rita Grande	(Slovakia) Martina Suchá	6–1, 6–1
2002	(Slovenia) Maja Matevžič	(Czech Republic) Iveta Benešová	6–0, 6–1

=== Doubles ===
Date	Champion	Runner-up	Score
1999	(Belgium) Kim Clijsters (Belgium) Laurence Courtois	(Belarus) Olga Barabanschikova (United States) Lilia Osterloh	6–2, 3–6, 7–5
2000	(Slovakia) Daniela Hantuchová (Slovakia) Karina Habšudová	(Hungary) Petra Mandula (Austria) Patricia Wartusch	walkover
2001	(Czech Republic) Dája Bedáňová (Russia) Elena Bovina	(France) Nathalie Dechy (United States) Meilen Tu	6–3, 6–4
2002	(Slovenia) Maja Matevžič (Slovakia) Henrieta Nagyová	(France) Nathalie Dechy (United States) Meilen Tu	6–4, 6–0
