= 1997 Estoril Open – Doubles =

Doubles
- 1997 Estoril Open

Final
- Champions: (Brazil) Gustavo Kuerten; (Brazil) Fernando Meligeni
- Runners-up: (Italy) Andrea Gaudenzi; (Italy) Filippo Messori
- Score: 6–2, 6–2

Events
| Singles | Doubles |
| ← 1996 · | Estoril Open | · 1998 → |

Tomás Carbonell and Francisco Roig were the defending champions, but did not participate this year.

Gustavo Kuerten and Fernando Meligeni won in the final 6–2, 6–2, against Andrea Gaudenzi and Filippo Messori.

== Seeds ==
1. (Belgium) Libor Pimek / (South Africa) Byron Talbot (first round)
2. (United States) Donald Johnson / (United States) Francisco Montana (first round)
3. (Netherlands) Hendrik Jan Davids / (Netherlands) Menno Oosting (first round)
4. (South Africa) Marius Barnard / (South Africa) Piet Norval (first round)

== Draw ==
=== Key ===
- Q = Qualifier
- WC = Wild card
- LL = Lucky loser
- Alt = Alternate
- ITF = ITF entry
- PR = Protected ranking
- SR = Special ranking
- SE = Special exempt
- JE = Junior exempt
- JR = Junior Accelerator Programme entrant
- CO = College Accelerator Programme entrant
- NG = Next Gen Accelerator Program entrant
- w/o = Walkover
- r = Retired
- d = Defaulted

=== Draw ===
First round

Quarterfinals

Semifinals

Final

1
- (Belgium) L Pimek
- (South Africa) B Talbot
6
2
3

- (Portugal) E Couto
- (Portugal) B Mota
4
6
6

- (Portugal) E Couto
- (Portugal) B Mota
1
6
6

- (Latvia) Ģ Dzelde
- (Russia) Y Kafelnikov
6
7

- (Latvia) Ģ Dzelde
- (Russia) Y Kafelnikov
6
2
7

LL
- (Germany) M-K Goellner
- (Germany) L Rehmann
4
6

- (Latvia) Ģ Dzelde
- (Russia) Y Kafelnikov
4
6
4

3
- (Netherlands) HJ Davids
- (Netherlands) M Oosting
1
5

- (Italy) A Gaudenzi
- (Italy) F Messori
6
2
6

Q
- (Australia) R Fromberg
- (France) F Santoro
6
7

Q
- (Australia) R Fromberg
- (France) F Santoro
6
3
6

- (Italy) A Gaudenzi
- (Italy) F Messori
5
6
6

- (Italy) A Gaudenzi
- (Italy) F Messori
1
6
7

- (Sweden) D Ekerot
- (United States) T. J. Middleton
7
4
3

- (Italy) A Gaudenzi
- (Italy) F Messori
2
2

- (Netherlands) S Noteboom
- (Sweden) P Nyborg
2
6
3

WC
- (Brazil) G Kuerten
- (Brazil) F Meligeni
6
6

- (Argentina) P Albano
- (Spain) À Corretja
6
4
6

- (Argentina) P Albano
- (Spain) À Corretja
7
6

- (United States) D Randall
- (United States) J Waite
7
4
6

- (United States) D Randall
- (United States) J Waite
6
2

4
- (South Africa) M Barnard
- (South Africa) P Norval
6
6
2

- (Argentina) P Albano
- (Spain) À Corretja
4
0

WC
- (Portugal) B Fragoso
- (Portugal) V Gonçalves
5
1

WC
- (Brazil) G Kuerten
- (Brazil) F Meligeni
6
6

- (Portugal) J Cunha e Silva
- (Portugal) N Marques
7
6

- (Portugal) J Cunha e Silva
- (Portugal) N Marques
7
6
3

WC
- (Brazil) G Kuerten
- (Brazil) F Meligeni
7
6

WC
- (Brazil) G Kuerten
- (Brazil) F Meligeni
5
7
6

2
- (United States) D Johnson
- (United States) F Montana
6
2
