= 1998 Estoril Open – Men's doubles =

Men's doubles
- 1998 Estoril Open

Final
- Champions: (United States) Donald Johnson; (United States) Francisco Montana
- Runners-up: (Mexico) David Roditi; (Netherlands) Fernon Wibier
- Score: 6–1, 2–6, 6–1

Events
Singles	men	women
Doubles	men	women
← 1997 ·	Estoril Open	· 1999 →

Gustavo Kuerten and Fernando Meligeni were the defending champions. Kuerten did not participate this year. Meligeni partnered Filippo Messori, losing in the quarterfinals.

Donald Johnson and Francisco Montana won in the final 6–1, 2–6, 6–1, against David Roditi and Fernon Wibier.

== Seeds ==
1. (United States) Donald Johnson / (United States) Francisco Montana (champions)
2. (Argentina) Luis Lobo / (Spain) Javier Sánchez (first round)
3. (United Kingdom) Neil Broad / (South Africa) Piet Norval (first round)
4. (South Africa) David Adams / (Argentina) Daniel Orsanic (first round)

== Draw ==
=== Key ===
- Q = Qualifier
- WC = Wild card
- LL = Lucky loser
- Alt = Alternate
- ITF = ITF entry
- PR = Protected ranking
- SR = Special ranking
- SE = Special exempt
- JE = Junior exempt
- JR = Junior Accelerator Programme entrant
- CO = College Accelerator Programme entrant
- NG = Next Gen Accelerator Program entrant
- w/o = Walkover
- r = Retired
- d = Defaulted

=== Draw ===
First round

Quarterfinals

Semifinals

Final

1
- (United States) D Johnson
- (United States) F Montana
6
7

- (Czech Republic) J Novák
- (Czech Republic) P Vízner
3
5

1
- (United States) D Johnson
- (United States) F Montana
3
7
6

- (Netherlands) T Kempers
- (Netherlands) M Oosting
6
5
1

- (United States) T Kronemann
- (North Macedonia) A Kitinov
6
6
2

- (United States) T Kronemann
- (North Macedonia) A Kitinov
2
7
6

1
- (United States) D Johnson
- (United States) F Montana
6
7

4
- (South Africa) D Adams
- (Argentina) D Orsanic
2
0

- (Spain) T Carbonell
- (Spain) F Roig
2
6

- (Brazil) F Meligeni
- (Italy) F Messori
6
6

- (Brazil) F Meligeni
- (Italy) F Messori
6
2
6

Q
- (Australia) W Arthurs
- (Australia) A Kratzmann
2
6
2

- (Spain) T Carbonell
- (Spain) F Roig
2
6
7

- (Spain) T Carbonell
- (Spain) F Roig
6
3
6

1
- (United States) D Johnson
- (United States) F Montana
6
2
6

- (Mexico) D Roditi
- (Netherlands) F Wibier
7
1
6

- (Mexico) D Roditi
- (Netherlands) F Wibier
1
6
1

- (Italy) C Brandi
- (France) F Santoro
5
6
2

- (Mexico) D Roditi
- (Netherlands) F Wibier
7
6

WC
- (Italy) A Gaudenzi
- (Austria) T Muster
6
6

WC
- (Italy) A Gaudenzi
- (Austria) T Muster
6
4

3
- (United Kingdom) N Broad
- (South Africa) P Norval
2
2

- (Mexico) D Roditi
- (Netherlands) F Wibier
3
6
7

- (United States) D Randall
- (United States) J Waite
4
4

WC
- (Portugal) J Cunha e Silva
- (Portugal) N Marques
6
3
6

WC
- (Portugal) E Couto
- (Portugal) B Mota
6
6

WC
- (Portugal) E Couto
- (Portugal) B Mota
7
1
4

WC
- (Portugal) J Cunha e Silva
- (Portugal) N Marques
6
5
7

WC
- (Portugal) J Cunha e Silva
- (Portugal) N Marques
5
6
6

2
- (Argentina) L Lobo
- (Spain) J Sánchez
4
7
6
