= 1995 Estoril Open – Doubles =

Doubles
- 1995 Estoril Open

Final
- Champions: (Russia) Yevgeny Kafelnikov; (Russia) Andrei Olhovskiy
- Runners-up: (Germany) Marc-Kevin Goellner; (Italy) Diego Nargiso
- Score: 5–7, 7–5, 6–2

Details
- Draw: 16
- Seeds: 4

Events
| Singles | Doubles |
| ← 1994 · | Estoril Open | · 1996 → |

Cristian Brandi and Federico Mordegan were the defending champions, but did not participate this year.

Yevgeny Kafelnikov and Andrei Olhovskiy won in the final 5–7, 7–5, 6–2, against Marc-Kevin Goellner and Diego Nargiso.

== Seeds ==
1. (Russia) Yevgeny Kafelnikov / (Russia) Andrei Olhovskiy (champions)
2. (Czech Republic) David Rikl / (Czech Republic) Karel Nováček (first round)
3. (Spain) Sergio Casal / (Spain) Emilio Sánchez (semifinals)
4. (Netherlands) Tom Nijssen / (Netherlands) Menno Oosting (first round)

== Draw ==
=== Key ===
- Q = Qualifier
- WC = Wild card
- LL = Lucky loser
- Alt = Alternate
- ITF = ITF entry
- PR = Protected ranking
- SR = Special ranking
- SE = Special exempt
- JE = Junior exempt
- JR = Junior Accelerator Programme entrant
- CO = College Accelerator Programme entrant
- NG = Next Gen Accelerator Program entrant
- w/o = Walkover
- r = Retired
- d = Defaulted

=== Draw ===
First round

Quarterfinals

Semifinals

Final

1
- (Russia) Y Kafelnikov
- (Russia) A Olhovskiy
7
6

WC
- (Spain) A Berasategui
- (Spain) C Costa
6
2

1
- (Russia) Y Kafelnikov
- (Russia) A Olhovskiy
6
6

Q
- (Spain) JA Conde
- (Portugal) N Marques
6
7

Q
- (Spain) JA Conde
- (Portugal) N Marques
3
2

- (Spain) J Sánchez
- (United States) B Shelton
4
5

1
- (Russia) Y Kafelnikov
- (Russia) A Olhovskiy
4
7
6

3
- (Spain) S Casal
- (Spain) E Sánchez
7
7

3
- (Spain) S Casal
- (Spain) E Sánchez
6
5
4

- (United States) L Jensen
- (United States) M Jensen
6
5

3
- (Spain) S Casal
- (Spain) E Sánchez
1
6
7

- (United States) T Kronemann
- (Australia) D Macpherson
6
6

- (United States) T Kronemann
- (Australia) D Macpherson
6
1
6

WC
- (Netherlands) R Krajicek
- (Ukraine) A Medvedev
3
4

1
- (Russia) Y Kafelnikov
- (Russia) A Olhovskiy
5
7
6

WC
- (Portugal) E Couto
- (Portugal) B Mota
1
4

- (Germany) M-K Goellner
- (Italy) D Nargiso
7
5
2

- (Spain) T Carbonell
- (Spain) F Roig
6
6

- (Spain) T Carbonell
- (Spain) F Roig
2
6
6

- (United States) D Randall
- (United States) G Van Emburgh
6
7

- (United States) D Randall
- (United States) G Van Emburgh
6
2
7

4
- (Netherlands) T Nijssen
- (Netherlands) M Oosting
1
5

- (United States) D Randall
- (United States) G Van Emburgh
4
6
2

- (United States) R Leach
- (United States) S Melville
6
6

- (Germany) M-K Goellner
- (Italy) D Nargiso
6
4
6

- (South Africa) B Talbot
- (United States) K Thorne
4
2

- (United States) R Leach
- (United States) S Melville
4
7
3

- (Germany) M-K Goellner
- (Italy) D Nargiso
6
7

- (Germany) M-K Goellner
- (Italy) D Nargiso
6
6
6

2
- (Czech Republic) D Rikl
- (Czech Republic) K Nováček
4
6
