= 1996 Estoril Open – Doubles =

Doubles
- 1996 Estoril Open

Final
- Champions: (Spain) Tomás Carbonell (Spain) Francisco Roig
- Runners-up: (Netherlands) Tom Nijssen (United States) Greg Van Emburgh
- Score: 6–3, 6–2

Details
- Draw: 16
- Seeds: 4

Events
Singles	Doubles
← 1995 ·	Estoril Open	· 1997 →

Yevgeny Kafelnikov and Andrei Olhovskiy were the defending champions but only Kafelnikov competed that year with Paul Haarhuis.

Haarhuis and Kafelnikov lost in the first round to Javier Sánchez and Sjeng Schalken.

Tomás Carbonell and Francisco Roig won in the final 6–3, 6–2 against Tom Nijssen and Greg Van Emburgh.

== Seeds ==
1. (Netherlands) Paul Haarhuis / (Russia) Yevgeny Kafelnikov (first round)
2. (South Africa) Ellis Ferreira / (United States) Mark Keil (semifinals)
3. (United States) Trevor Kronemann / (Australia) David Macpherson (first round)
4. (Belgium) Libor Pimek / (South Africa) Byron Talbot (quarterfinals)

== Draw ==
=== Key ===
- Q = Qualifier
- WC = Wild card
- LL = Lucky loser
- Alt = Alternate
- ITF = ITF entry
- PR = Protected ranking
- SR = Special ranking
- SE = Special exempt
- JE = Junior exempt
- JR = Junior Accelerator Programme entrant
- CO = College Accelerator Programme entrant
- NG = Next Gen Accelerator Program entrant
- w/o = Walkover
- r = Retired
- d = Defaulted

First round
1	(Netherlands) P Haarhuis (Russia) Y Kafelnikov	6	5	2
(Spain) J Sánchez (Netherlands) S Schalken	2	7	6
(Czech Republic) J Novák (Czech Republic) D Rikl	6	6
(Spain) À Corretja (South Africa) J-L de Jager	3	4
3	(United States) T Kronemann (Australia) D Macpherson	6	4
WC	(Portugal) J Cunha e Silva (Portugal) N Marques	7	6
Q	(Spain) A Berasategui (Spain) J Burillo	7	4	4
(Netherlands) T Nijssen (United States) G Van Emburgh	5	6	6
(Spain) T Carbonell (Spain) F Roig	6	6
WC	(Portugal) B Fragoso (Portugal) N Matias	1	3
WC	(Hungary) L Markovits (Portugal) B Mota	4	3
4	(Belgium) L Pimek (South Africa) B Talbot	6	6
(United Kingdom) N Broad (South Africa) P Norval	6	6	6
(Netherlands) H J Davids (Germany) M-K Goellner	4	7	4
(South Africa) D Adams (South Africa) M Barnard	6	7	3
2	(South Africa) E Ferreira (United States) M Keil	7	6	6

Quarterfinals
(Spain) J Sánchez (Netherlands) S Schalken	3	4
(Czech Republic) J Novák (Czech Republic) D Rikl	6	6
WC	(Portugal) J Cunha e Silva (Portugal) N Marques	6	6	4
(Netherlands) T Nijssen (United States) G Van Emburgh	2	7	6
(Spain) T Carbonell (Spain) F Roig	6	7
4	(Belgium) L Pimek (South Africa) B Talbot	4	5
(United Kingdom) N Broad (South Africa) P Norval	6	2
2	(South Africa) E Ferreira (United States) M Keil	7	6

Semifinals
(Czech Republic) J Novák (Czech Republic) D Rikl	3	1
(Netherlands) T Nijssen (United States) G Van Emburgh	6	6
(Spain) T Carbonell (Spain) F Roig	6	3	6
2	(South Africa) E Ferreira (United States) M Keil	4	6	2

Final
(Netherlands) T Nijssen (United States) G Van Emburgh	3	2
(Spain) T Carbonell (Spain) F Roig	6	6
