= 1999 Estoril Open – Women's doubles =

Women's doubles
- 1999 Estoril Open

Final
- Champions: (Spain) Alicia Ortuño; (Spain) Cristina Torrens Valero
- Runners-up: (Hungary) Anna Földényi; (Hungary) Rita Kuti-Kis
- Score: 7–6^{(7–4)}, 3–6, 6–3

Events
Singles	men	women
Doubles	men	women
← 1998 ·	Estoril Open	· 2000 →

The 1999 Estoril Open women's doubles was the doubles event of the first edition of the WTA Tour Estoril Open; a WTA Tier IV tournament and the most prestigious women's tennis tournament held in Portugal. This tournament was part of the ITF Tour last year, and it was won by Caroline Dhenin and Émilie Loit. They did not compete in the event this year.

Alicia Ortuño and Cristina Torrens Valero won in the final 7–6^{(7–4)}, 3–6, 6–3 against Anna Földényi and Rita Kuti-Kis.

== Seeds ==
1. (Slovenia) Katarina Srebotnik / (Argentina) Paola Suárez (first round)
2. (Netherlands) Kristie Boogert / (Belgium) Laurence Courtois (first round)
3. (Ukraine) Olga Lugina / (Germany) Elena Wagner (quarterfinals)
4. (Belarus) Olga Barabanschikova / (Italy) Laura Golarsa (quarterfinals)

== Draw ==
=== Key ===
- Q = Qualifier
- WC = Wild card
- LL = Lucky loser
- Alt = Alternate
- SE = Special exempt
- PR = Protected ranking
- ITF = ITF entry
- JE = Junior exempt
- w/o = Walkover
- r = Retired
- d = Defaulted
- SR = Special ranking

First round

Quarterfinals

Semifinals

Final

1
- (Slovenia) K Srebotnik
- (Argentina) P Suárez
6^{3}
6
3

- (Germany) A Huber
- (Slovakia) J Husárová
7^{7}
3
6

- (Germany) A Huber
- (Slovakia) J Husárová

- (United Kingdom) H Crook
- (United Kingdom) V Davies
5
6^{1}

- (Spain) A Ortuño
- (Spain) C Torrens Valero
w/o

- (Spain) A Ortuño
- (Spain) C Torrens Valero
7
7^{7}

- (Spain) A Ortuño
- (Spain) C Torrens Valero
7^{7}
6

3
- (Ukraine) O Lugina
- (Germany) E Wagner
5
6
6

- (Spain) RM Andrés Rodríguez
- (Spain) E Bes Ostariz
6^{5}
4

Q
- (India) N Vaidyanathan
- (Romania) A Vanc
7
4
4

3
- (Ukraine) O Lugina
- (Germany) E Wagner
5
6^{8}

- (Spain) RM Andrés Rodríguez
- (Spain) E Bes Ostariz
3
6
6

- (Spain) RM Andrés Rodríguez
- (Spain) E Bes Ostariz
7
7^{10}

- (South Africa) L Horn
- (United States) A Jensen
6
4
3

- (Spain) A Ortuño
- (Spain) C Torrens Valero
7^{7}
3
6

- (Hungary) K Marosi
- (Brazil) V Menga
6
4
7^{8}

- (Hungary) A Földényi
- (Hungary) R Kuti-Kis
6^{4}
6
3

- (Bulgaria) S Krivencheva
- (Spain) M Ramón Climent
4
6
6^{6}

- (Hungary) K Marosi
- (Brazil) V Menga
6
6

WC
- (Portugal) A Cardoso
- (Portugal) C Correia
2
7^{7}
4

4
- (Belarus) O Barabanschikova
- (Italy) L Golarsa
3
4

4
- (Belarus) O Barabanschikova
- (Italy) L Golarsa
6
6^{5}
6

- (Hungary) K Marosi
- (Brazil) V Menga
5
0

- (Australia) J Dokić
- (Germany) J Kandarr
6
5
6

- (Hungary) A Földényi
- (Hungary) R Kuti-Kis
7
6

- (Spain) C Martínez Granados
- (Australia) B Stewart
2
7
1

- (Australia) J Dokić
- (Germany) J Kandarr
6
3
6^{5}

- (Hungary) A Földényi
- (Hungary) R Kuti-Kis
7
6

- (Hungary) A Földényi
- (Hungary) R Kuti-Kis
4
6
7^{7}

2
- (Netherlands) K Boogert
- (Belgium) L Courtois
5
3

== Qualifying ==
=== Seeds ===
1. (France) Lea Ghirardi / (France) Sarah Pitkowski (second round)
2. (India) Nirupama Vaidyanathan / (Romania) Andreea Vanc (Qualifiers)
3. (Germany) Julia Abe / (Bulgaria) Lubomira Bacheva (qualifying competition)
4. (Italy) Adriana Serra Zanetti / (Italy) Maria Paola Zavagli (first round)

=== Qualifiers ===
1. (India) Nirupama Vaidyanathan / (Romania) Andreea Vanc

== Qualifying draw ==
=== Key ===
- Q = Qualifier
- WC = Wild card
- LL = Lucky loser
- Alt = Alternate
- SE = Special exempt
- PR = Protected ranking
- ITF = ITF entry
- JE = Junior exempt
- w/o = Walkover
- r = Retired
- d = Defaulted
- SR = Special ranking

First round

Second round

Qualifying competition

1
- (France) Lea Ghirardi
- (France) Sarah Pitkowski
8

- (Czech Republic) Radka Pelikánová
- (Czech Republic) Ludmila Richterová
2

1
- (France) Lea Ghirardi
- (France) Sarah Pitkowski
6

3
- (Germany) Julia Abe
- (Bulgaria) Lubomira Bacheva
8

3
- (Germany) Julia Abe
- (Bulgaria) Lubomira Bacheva
9

WC
- (Germany) Anca Barna
- (Austria) Barbara Schwartz
8

3
- (Germany) Julia Abe
- (Bulgaria) Lubomira Bacheva
2

2
- (India) Nirupama Vaidyanathan
- (Romania) Andreea Vanc
8

- (Italy) Francesca Lubiani
- (Italy) Flora Perfetti
8

4
- (Italy) Adriana Serra Zanetti
- (Italy) Maria Paola Zavagli
6

- (Italy) Francesca Lubiani
- (Italy) Flora Perfetti
5

2
- (India) Nirupama Vaidyanathan
- (Romania) Andreea Vanc
8

- (Slovakia) Ľudmila Cervanová
- (Slovakia) Katarína Studeníková
8

2
- (India) Nirupama Vaidyanathan
- (Romania) Andreea Vanc
9
