= 1994 Estoril Open – Doubles =

Doubles
- 1994 Estoril Open

Final
- Champions: (Italy) Cristian Brandi (Italy) Federico Mordegan
- Runners-up: (Netherlands) Richard Krajicek (Netherlands) Menno Oosting
- Score: W/O

Events
Singles	Doubles
← 1993 ·	Estoril Open	· 1995 →

David Adams and Andrei Olhovskiy were the defending champions, but did not participate this year.

Cristian Brandi and Federico Mordegan won in the final, via walkover, against Richard Krajicek and Menno Oosting.

== Seeds ==
1. (Spain) Sergio Casal / (Spain) Emilio Sánchez (first round)
2. (Netherlands) Hendrik Jan Davids / (South Africa) Piet Norval (first round)
3. (Germany) David Prinosil / (Germany) Udo Riglewski (first round)
4. (United States) Shelby Cannon / (United States) Scott Melville (quarterfinals)

== Draw ==
=== Key ===
- Q = Qualifier
- WC = Wild card
- LL = Lucky loser
- Alt = Alternate
- SE = Special exempt
- PR = Protected ranking
- ITF = ITF entry
- JE = Junior exempt
- w/o = Walkover
- r = Retired
- d = Defaulted
- SR = Special ranking

=== Draw ===
First round
1	(Spain) S Casal (Spain) E Sánchez	6	4
(Russia) Y Kafelnikov (Spain) J Sánchez	7	6
(United States) L Jensen (Italy) D Nargiso	7	6
(Australia) M Kratzmann (Australia) L Warder	6	3
3	(Germany) D Prinosil (Germany) U Riglewski	7	4	3
(Netherlands) R Krajicek (Netherlands) M Oosting	6	6	6
WC	(Portugal) J Cunha e Silva (Portugal) N Marques	4	3
(United States) D Johnson (United States) F Montana	6	6
WC	(Portugal) E Couto (Portugal) B Mota	w/o
(Germany) M-K Goellner (Netherlands) M Koevermans
LL	(Spain) E Benfele Álvarez (Argentina) D Orsanic	3	4
4	(United States) S Cannon (United States) S Melville	6	6
(Belgium) L Pimek (United States) G Van Emburgh	6	6
(United States) S DeVries (Australia) D Macpherson	2	2
(Italy) C Brandi (Italy) F Mordegan	6	6	7
2	(Netherlands) HJ Davids (South Africa) P Norval	7	3	6

Quarterfinals
(Russia) Y Kafelnikov (Spain) J Sánchez	6	6
(United States) L Jensen (Italy) D Nargiso	1	4
(Netherlands) R Krajicek (Netherlands) M Oosting	6	6	7
(United States) D Johnson (United States) F Montana	7	4	6
WC	(Portugal) E Couto (Portugal) B Mota	6	2	7
4	(United States) S Cannon (United States) S Melville	4	6	6
(Belgium) L Pimek (United States) G Van Emburgh	6	6	3
(Italy) C Brandi (Italy) F Mordegan	0	7	6

Semifinals
(Russia) Y Kafelnikov (Spain) J Sánchez	6	5
(Netherlands) R Krajicek (Netherlands) M Oosting	7	7
WC	(Portugal) E Couto (Portugal) B Mota	5	6	4
(Italy) C Brandi (Italy) F Mordegan	7	4	6

Final
(Netherlands) R Krajicek (Netherlands) M Oosting
(Italy) C Brandi (Italy) F Mordegan	w/o
