= 1999 Estoril Open – Men's doubles =

Men's doubles
- 1999 Estoril Open

Final
- Champions: (Spain) Tomás Carbonell; (United States) Donald Johnson
- Runners-up: (Czech Republic) Jiří Novák; (Czech Republic) David Rikl
- Score: 6–3, 2–6, 6–1

Events
| Singles | men | women |
| Doubles | men | women |
| ← 1998 · | Estoril Open | · 2000 → |

Donald Johnson and Francisco Montana were the defending champions, but did not participate together this year. Johnson partnered Tomás Carbonell, successfully defending his title. Montana partnered Chris Haggard, losing in the semifinals.

Carbonell and Johnson won in the final 6–3, 2–6, 6–1, against Jiří Novák and David Rikl.

== Seeds ==
1. (Czech Republic) Jiří Novák / (Czech Republic) David Rikl (final)
2. (South Africa) Chris Haggard / (United States) Francisco Montana (semifinals)
3. (Spain) Tomás Carbonell / (United States) Donald Johnson (champions)
4. (Australia) David Macpherson / (Sweden) Peter Nyborg (semifinals)

== Draw ==
=== Key ===
- Q = Qualifier
- WC = Wild card
- LL = Lucky loser
- Alt = Alternate
- ITF = ITF entry
- PR = Protected ranking
- SR = Special ranking
- SE = Special exempt
- JE = Junior exempt
- JR = Junior Accelerator Programme entrant
- CO = College Accelerator Programme entrant
- NG = Next Gen Accelerator Program entrant
- w/o = Walkover
- r = Retired
- d = Defaulted

=== Finals ===
First round

Quarterfinals

Semifinals

Final

1
- (Czech Republic) J Novák
- (Czech Republic) D Rikl
w/o

- (Russia) Y Kafelnikov
- (Ukraine) A Medvedev

1
- (Czech Republic) J Novák
- (Czech Republic) D Rikl
7
6

- (North Macedonia) A Kitinov
- (Netherlands) S Noteboom
2
6

- (Portugal) J Cunha e Silva
- (Portugal) N Marques
5
2

- (Portugal) J Cunha e Silva
- (Portugal) N Marques
6
7

1
- (Czech Republic) J Novák
- (Czech Republic) D Rikl
6
6

4
- (Australia) D Macpherson
- (Sweden) P Nyborg
6
7

4
- (Australia) D Macpherson
- (Sweden) P Nyborg
2
2

- (Brazil) F Costa
- (Spain) A Martín
1
5

4
- (Australia) D Macpherson
- (Sweden) P Nyborg
6
7

WC
- (Portugal) E Couto
- (Portugal) B Fragoso
1
6
1

WC
- (Spain) F Mantilla
- (Russia) M Safin
2
6

WC
- (Spain) F Mantilla
- (Russia) M Safin
6
2
6

1
- (Czech Republic) J Novák
- (Czech Republic) D Rikl
3
6
1

- (Spain) Á López Morón
- (Spain) A Portas
1
4

3
- (Spain) T Carbonell
- (United States) D Johnson
6
2
6

- (Spain) A Berasategui
- (Spain) F Roig
6
6

- (Spain) A Berasategui
- (Spain) F Roig
2
2

Q
- (Spain) F López
- (Spain) T Robredo
1
4

3
- (Spain) T Carbonell
- (United States) D Johnson
6
6

3
- (Spain) T Carbonell
- (United States) D Johnson
6
6

3
- (Spain) T Carbonell
- (United States) D Johnson
6
2
6

- (Morocco) K Alami
- (Morocco) H Arazi
4
6

2
- (South Africa) C Haggard
- (United States) F Montana
3
6
4

- (Spain) E Nicolás
- (Spain) G Puentes
6
7

- (Spain) E Nicolás
- (Spain) G Puentes
1
4

WC
- (Argentina) L Lobo
- (Chile) M Ríos
3
1

2
- (South Africa) C Haggard
- (United States) F Montana
6
6

2
- (South Africa) C Haggard
- (United States) F Montana
6
6
