= 1999 Estoril Open – Women's singles =

Women's singles
- 1999 Estoril Open

Final
- Champion: (Slovenia) Katarina Srebotnik
- Runner-up: (Hungary) Rita Kuti-Kis
- Score: 6–3, 6–1

Events
Singles	men	women
Doubles	men	women
Estoril Open	· 2000 →

The 1999 Estoril Open women's singles was the singles event of the first edition of the WTA Tour Estoril Open; a WTA Tier IV tournament and the most prestigious women's tennis tournament held in Portugal. This tournament was part of the ITF Circuit last year, and it was won by Barbara Schwartz. Schwartz was eliminated in the second round of this year's event.

Katarina Srebotnik won in the final 6–3, 6–1 against Rita Kuti-Kis.

== Seeds ==
1. (Germany) Anke Huber (second round)
2. (France) Sarah Pitkowski (second round)
3. (Luxembourg) Anne Kremer (quarterfinals)
4. (Germany) Elena Wagner (second round)
5. (Croatia) Silvija Talaja (quarterfinals)
6. (Belarus) Olga Barabanschikova (first round)
7. (Italy) Laura Golarsa (first round)
8. (Netherlands) Seda Noorlander (first round)

== Draw ==
=== Key ===
- Q = Qualifier
- WC = Wild card
- LL = Lucky loser
- Alt = Alternate
- SE = Special exempt
- PR = Protected ranking
- ITF = ITF entry
- JE = Junior exempt
- w/o = Walkover
- r = Retired
- d = Defaulted
- SR = Special ranking

=== Finals ===
Semifinals
(Hungary) Rita Kuti-Kis	6	6
(Argentina) Mariana Díaz Oliva	4	2
LL	(Bulgaria) Lubomira Bacheva	5	4
(Slovenia) Katarina Srebotnik	7	6

Final
(Hungary) Rita Kuti-Kis	3	1
(Slovenia) Katarina Srebotnik	6	6

=== Top half ===
First round
1	(Germany) A Huber	6	6
(Netherlands) A Hopmans	2	3
(Czech Republic) D Chládková	5	4
(Hungary) R Kuti-Kis	7	6
(Slovakia) K Studeníková	4	0
Q	(Germany) A Barna	6	6
(Czech Republic) A Gerši	7	3	6
6	(Belarus) O Barabanschikova	5	6	2
3	(Luxembourg) A Kremer	6	6
(Romania) R Sandu	3	0
(France) L Ghirardi	2	2
LL	(Spain) E Bes Ostariz	6	6
(Argentina) M Díaz Oliva	6	6
WC	(Portugal) AC Nogueira	1	1
(Austria) B Schwartz	6	6
8	(Netherlands) S Noorlander	2	1

Second round
1	(Germany) A Huber	6^{9}	1
(Hungary) R Kuti-Kis	7^{11}	6
Q	(Germany) A Barna	w/o
(Czech Republic) A Gerši
3	(Luxembourg) A Kremer	6	6
LL	(Spain) E Bes Ostariz	4	4
(Argentina) M Díaz Oliva	1	6	6
(Austria) B Schwartz	6	0	1

Quarterfinals
(Hungary) R Kuti-Kis	6	6
Q	(Germany) A Barna	3	0
3	(Luxembourg) A Kremer	7	2	2
(Argentina) M Díaz Oliva	5	6	6

Semifinals
(Hungary) R Kuti-Kis	6	6
(Argentina) M Díaz Oliva	4	2

=== Bottom half ===
First round
5	(Croatia) S Talaja	6	3	6
(Argentina) P Suárez	2	6	2
Q	(Belgium) L Courtois	6^{7}	6	2
(Slovakia) Ľ Cervanová	7^{9}	4	6
WC	(Brazil) V Menga	1	1
LL	(Bulgaria) L Bacheva	6	6
(Germany) J Kandarr	6	4	3
4	(Germany) E Wagner	3	6	6
7	(Italy) L Golarsa	0	0
(Germany) J Abe	6	6
(Slovenia) K Srebotnik	6	6
(Spain) C Martínez Granados	3	0
Q	(Spain) C Torrens Valero	2	7	6
Q	(Hungary) A Földényi	6	5	2
(Netherlands) K Boogert	1	3
2	(France) S Pitkowski	6	6

Second round
5	(Croatia) S Talaja	6	6
(Slovakia) Ľ Cervanová	3	2
LL	(Bulgaria) L Bacheva	7	6
4	(Germany) E Wagner	5	3
(Germany) J Abe	7	4	2
(Slovenia) K Srebotnik	5	6	6
Q	(Spain) C Torrens Valero	6	6
2	(France) S Pitkowski	4	1

Quarterfinals
5	(Croatia) S Talaja	2	6	4
LL	(Bulgaria) L Bacheva	6	3	6
(Slovenia) K Srebotnik	6	6
Q	(Spain) C Torrens Valero	3	3

Semifinals
LL	(Bulgaria) L Bacheva	5	4
(Slovenia) K Srebotnik	7	6

== Qualifying ==
=== Seeds ===
1. (Spain) Cristina Torrens Valero (qualifier)
2. (Belgium) Laurence Courtois (qualifier)
3. (Hungary) Anna Földényi (qualifier)
4. (South Africa) Liezel Horn (second round)
5. (Bulgaria) Lubomira Bacheva (qualifying competition, lucky loser)
6. (Italy) Flora Perfetti (second round)
7. (Spain) Gisela Riera (first round)
8. (Spain) Eva Bes Ostariz (qualifying competition, lucky loser)

=== Qualifiers ===
1. (Spain) Cristina Torrens Valero
2. (Germany) Anca Barna
3. (Hungary) Anna Földényi
4. (Belgium) Laurence Courtois

=== Lucky losers ===
1. (Spain) Eva Bes Ostariz
2. (Bulgaria) Lubomira Bacheva

== Qualifying draw ==
=== Key ===
- Q = Qualifier
- WC = Wild card
- LL = Lucky loser
- Alt = Alternate
- SE = Special exempt
- PR = Protected ranking
- ITF = ITF entry
- JE = Junior exempt
- w/o = Walkover
- r = Retired
- d = Defaulted
- SR = Special ranking

=== First qualifier ===
First round
1	(Spain) Cristina Torrens Valero	6	6
(Hungary) Katalin Marosi	4	0
WC	(Portugal) Cristina Correia	2	1
(Slovakia) Janette Husárová	6	6
(India) Nirupama Vaidyanathan	5	6	7^{7}
(Romania) Andreea Vanc	7	1	6^{4}
(Spain) Rosa María Andrés Rodríguez	5	6	4
8	(Spain) Eva Bes Ostariz	7	3	6

Second round
1	(Spain) Cristina Torrens Valero	6	6
(Slovakia) Janette Husárová	0	1
(India) Nirupama Vaidyanathan	4	4
8	(Spain) Eva Bes Ostariz	6	6

Qualifying competition
1	(Spain) Cristina Torrens Valero	6	6
8	(Spain) Eva Bes Ostariz	3	3

=== Second qualifier ===
First round
4	(South Africa) Liezel Horn	6	7
WC	(Portugal) Angela Cardoso	1	5
(Germany) Anca Barna	6	6
(France) Edith Nunes-Bersot	0	2
(Australia) Amanda Grahame	3	1
(Spain) Mariam Ramón Climent	6	6
(Italy) Germana Di Natale	3	3
5	(Bulgaria) Lubomira Bacheva	6	6

Second round
4	(South Africa) Liezel Horn	2	6	1
(Germany) Anca Barna	6	2	6
(Spain) Mariam Ramón Climent	6	1	2
5	(Bulgaria) Lubomira Bacheva	0	6	6

Qualifying competition
(Germany) Anca Barna	6	1	6
5	(Bulgaria) Lubomira Bacheva	4	6	4

=== Third qualifier ===
First round
7	(Spain) Gisela Riera	3	6^{4}
(Czech Republic) Radka Pelikánová	6	7^{7}
(Belgium) Patty Van Acker	7	6^{4}	6
(Germany) Sandra Klösel	5	7^{7}	2
(Italy) Antonella Serra Zanetti	3	6	4
WC	(Australia) Jelena Dokić	6	3	6
(United Kingdom) Karen Cross	3	2
3	(Hungary) Anna Földényi	6	6

Second round
(Czech Republic) Radka Pelikánová	3	4
(Belgium) Patty Van Acker	6	6
WC	(Australia) Jelena Dokić	6^{2}	0
3	(Hungary) Anna Földényi	7^{7}	6

Qualifying competition
(Belgium) Patty Van Acker	6^{4}	2
3	(Hungary) Anna Földényi	7^{7}	6

=== Fourth qualifier ===
First round
6	(Italy) Flora Perfetti	6	6
(Ukraine) Olga Lugina	2	1
(Italy) Alice Canepa	0	2
(Spain) Alicia Ortuño	6	6
(Italy) Francesca Lubiani	6	1	6
(Austria) Sandra Dopfer	2	6	1
(Italy) Maria Paola Zavagli	3	7^{7}	4
2	(Belgium) Laurence Courtois	6	6^{4}	6

Second round
6	(Italy) Flora Perfetti	6^{9}	6^{1}
(Spain) Alicia Ortuño	7^{11}	7^{7}
(Italy) Francesca Lubiani	3	1
2	(Belgium) Laurence Courtois	6	6

Qualifying competition
(Spain) Alicia Ortuño	4	0
2	(Belgium) Laurence Courtois	6	6
