= 1996 Estoril Open – Singles =

Singles
- 1996 Estoril Open

Final
- Champion: (Austria) Thomas Muster
- Runner-up: (Italy) Andrea Gaudenzi
- Score: 7–6^{(7–4)}, 6–4

Details
- Draw: 32
- Seeds: 8

Events
| Singles | Doubles |
| ← 1995 · | Estoril Open | · 1997 → |

Thomas Muster was the defending champion and won in the final 7–6^{(7–4)}, 6–4 against Andrea Gaudenzi.

== Seeds ==
1. (Austria) Thomas Muster (champion)
2. (Russia) Yevgeny Kafelnikov (first round)
3. (Spain) Albert Costa (first round)
4. (Austria) Gilbert Schaller (first round)
5. (Netherlands) Paul Haarhuis (semifinals)
6. (Spain) Carlos Costa (quarterfinals)
7. (Spain) Alberto Berasategui (second round)
8. (Czech Republic) Bohdan Ulihrach (first round)

== Draw ==
=== Key ===
- Q = Qualifier
- WC = Wild card
- LL = Lucky loser
- Alt = Alternate
- ITF = ITF entry
- PR = Protected ranking
- SR = Special ranking
- SE = Special exempt
- JE = Junior exempt
- JR = Junior Accelerator Programme entrant
- CO = College Accelerator Programme entrant
- NG = Next Gen Accelerator Program entrant
- w/o = Walkover
- r = Retired
- d = Defaulted

=== Finals ===
Semifinals
1 | (Austria) Thomas Muster | 6^{6} | 6 | 6
(Spain) Àlex Corretja | 7^{8} | 4 | 0
5 | (Netherlands) Paul Haarhuis | 2 | 1
(Italy) Andrea Gaudenzi | 6 | 6

Final
1 | (Austria) Thomas Muster | 7^{7} | 6
(Italy) Andrea Gaudenzi | 6^{4} | 4

=== Top half ===
First round
1 | (Austria) T Muster | 6 | 7
Q | (Czech Republic) D Rikl | 1 | 5
(Spain) C Moyá | 6 | 6
(Netherlands) S Schalken | 3 | 4
(Italy) S Pescosolido | 6 | 6
WC | (Portugal) N Marques | 3 | 4
(Spain) F Clavet | 6 | 7
8 | (Czech Republic) B Ulihrach | 3 | 5
3 | (Spain) A Costa | 2 | 2
(Spain) À Corretja | 6 | 6
(Czech Republic) J Novák | 1 | 7^{7} | 6
(Slovakia) K Kučera | 6 | 6^{3} | 2
(Romania) A Voinea | 7^{9} | 1 | 1
WC | (Portugal) B Mota | 6^{7} | 6 | 6
Q | (Hungary) S Noszály | 2 | 5
6 | (Spain) C Costa | 6 | 7

Second round
1 | (Austria) T Muster | 6 | 6
(Spain) C Moyá | 4 | 2
(Italy) S Pescosolido | 6^{2} | 1
(Spain) F Clavet | 7^{7} | 6
(Spain) À Corretja | 6 | 6
(Czech Republic) J Novák | 4 | 2
WC | (Portugal) B Mota | 2 | 5
6 | (Spain) C Costa | 6 | 7

Quarterfinals
1 | (Austria) T Muster | 6 | 6
(Spain) F Clavet | 4 | 2
(Spain) À Corretja | 7 | 7
6 | (Spain) C Costa | 5 | 5

Semifinals
1 | (Austria) T Muster | 6^{6} | 6 | 6
(Spain) À Corretja | 7^{8} | 4 | 0

=== Bottom half ===
First round
5 | (Netherlands) P Haarhuis | 6 | 6
WC | (Portugal) J Cunha e Silva | 3 | 3
(Czech Republic) C Doseděl | 3 | 2
(Belgium) F Dewulf | 6 | 6
(Spain) J Arrese | 2 | 2
Q | (Australia) R Fromberg | 6 | 6
(Spain) J Burillo | 6 | 5 | 6
4 | (Austria) G Schaller | 3 | 7 | 0
7 | (Spain) A Berasategui | 7 | 6
(Spain) J Sánchez | 5 | 2
(Belgium) K Goossens | 4 | 2
(Spain) T Carbonell | 6 | 6
(Germany) M-K Goellner | 4 | 2
Q | (Spain) R Carretero | 6 | 6
(Italy) A Gaudenzi | 1 | 6 | 6
2 | (Russia) Y Kafelnikov | 6 | 3 | 0

Second round
5 | (Netherlands) P Haarhuis | 6 | 6
(Belgium) F Dewulf | 3 | 2
Q | (Australia) R Fromberg | 3 | 7^{7} | 6
(Spain) J Burillo | 6 | 6^{3} | 1
7 | (Spain) A Berasategui | 6^{6} | 6 | 6^{7}
(Spain) T Carbonell | 7^{8} | 1 | 7^{9}
Q | (Spain) R Carretero | 6 | 6^{7} | 5
(Italy) A Gaudenzi | 4 | 7^{9} | 7

Quarterfinals
5 | (Netherlands) P Haarhuis | 2 | 6 | 6
Q | (Australia) R Fromberg | 6 | 4 | 4
(Spain) T Carbonell | 3 | 1
(Italy) A Gaudenzi | 6 | 6

Semifinals
5 | (Netherlands) P Haarhuis | 2 | 1
(Italy) A Gaudenzi | 6 | 6
