= 1993 Estoril Open – Singles =

Singles
- 1993 Estoril Open

Final
- Champion: (Ukraine) Andrei Medvedev
- Runner-up: (Czech Republic) Karel Nováček
- Score: 6–4, 6–2

Details
- Draw: 32
- Seeds: 8

Events
Singles	Doubles
← 1992 ·	Estoril Open	· 1994 →

Carlos Costa was the defending champion, but lost in the first round this year.

Andrei Medvedev won the tournament, beating Karel Nováček in the final, 6–4, 6–2.

== Seeds ==
1. (United States) Ivan Lendl (second round)
2. (Spain) Carlos Costa (first round)
3. (Spain) Sergi Bruguera (quarterfinals)
4. (Czech Republic) Karel Nováček (final)
5. (Ukraine) Andrei Medvedev (champion)
6. (Sweden) Magnus Larsson (quarterfinals)
7. (Spain) Emilio Sánchez (semifinals)
8. N/A

== Draw ==
=== Key ===
- Q = Qualifier
- WC = Wild card
- LL = Lucky loser
- Alt = Alternate
- ITF = ITF entry
- PR = Protected ranking
- SR = Special ranking
- SE = Special exempt
- JE = Junior exempt
- JR = Junior Accelerator Programme entrant
- CO = College Accelerator Programme entrant
- NG = Next Gen Accelerator Program entrant
- w/o = Walkover
- r = Retired
- d = Defaulted

=== Finals ===
Semifinals
(Sweden) Magnus Gustafsson	4	4
4	(Czech Republic) Karel Nováček	6	6
5	(Ukraine) Andrei Medvedev	6	6
7	(Spain) Emilio Sánchez	4	2

Final
4	(Czech Republic) Karel Nováček	4	2
5	(Ukraine) Andrei Medvedev	6	6

=== Top half ===
First round
1	(United States) I Lendl	6	6
(Spain) MA Górriz	1	3
(Sweden) J Svensson	2	6	6
Q	(Spain) A Mancisidor	6	1	1
(Argentina) G Markus	6	6
WC	(Portugal) N Marques	4	3
(Sweden) M Gustafsson	6	6
LL	(Spain) E Benfele Álvarez	3	3
4	(Czech Republic) K Nováček	4	6	6
(Spain) F Clavet	6	3	2
WC	(Portugal) B Mota	3	1
(Spain) T Carbonell	6	6
(Argentina) F Davín	2	7^{7}	3
(Netherlands) P Haarhuis	6	6^{3}	6
Q	(Spain) J Burillo	3	6	6^{3}
6	(Sweden) M Larsson	6	2	7^{7}

Second round
1	(United States) I Lendl	3	4
(Sweden) J Svensson	6	6
(Argentina) G Markus	5	0
(Sweden) M Gustafsson	7	6
4	(Czech Republic) K Nováček	6	6
(Spain) T Carbonell	4	4
(Netherlands) P Haarhuis	6	1	6^{6}
6	(Sweden) M Larsson	1	6	7^{8}

Quarterfinals
(Sweden) J Svensson	6	2	5
(Sweden) M Gustafsson	2	6	7
4	(Czech Republic) K Nováček	7^{7}	4	7^{7}
6	(Sweden) M Larsson	6^{4}	6	6^{4}

Semifinals
(Sweden) M Gustafsson	4	4
4	(Czech Republic) K Nováček	6	6

=== Bottom half ===
First round
5	(Ukraine) A Medvedev	6	6
Q	(Spain) A Berasategui	2	2
(Spain) F Roig	6	6
WC	(Portugal) J Cunha e Silva	4	4
(Argentina) A Mancini	6	6
(Belgium) B Wuyts	2	4
(Spain) J Sánchez	5	2
3	(Spain) S Bruguera	7	6
7	(Spain) E Sánchez	6	1	6
(France) R Gilbert	3	6	3
(Netherlands) J Eltingh	2	2
(Spain) À Corretja	6	6
Q	(Argentina) F Yunis	7^{7}	6
(Russia) A Olhovskiy	6^{5}	3
(Italy) R Furlan	3	7^{7}	6
2	(Spain) C Costa	6	6^{2}	4

Second round
5	(Ukraine) A Medvedev	6	2	7^{7}
(Spain) F Roig	4	6	6^{2}
(Argentina) A Mancini	6	4	2
3	(Spain) S Bruguera	2	6	6
7	(Spain) E Sánchez	7^{8}	2	6
(Spain) À Corretja	6^{6}	6	4
Q	(Argentina) F Yunis	5	4
(Italy) R Furlan	7	6

Quarterfinals
5	(Ukraine) A Medvedev	3	6	6
3	(Spain) S Bruguera	6	1	2
7	(Spain) E Sánchez	6	6
(Italy) R Furlan	1	1

Semifinals
5	(Ukraine) A Medvedev	6	6
7	(Spain) E Sánchez	4	2
