= 2002 Estoril Open – Men's doubles =

Men's doubles
- 2002 Estoril Open

Final
- Champions: (Germany) Karsten Braasch; (Russia) Andrei Olhovskiy
- Runners-up: (Sweden) Simon Aspelin; (Australia) Andrew Kratzmann
- Score: 6–3, 6–3

Events
Singles	men	women
Doubles	men	women
← 2001 ·	Estoril Open	· 2003 →

Radek Štěpánek and Michal Tabara were the defending champions but only Štěpánek competed that year with Leoš Friedl.

Friedl and Štěpánek lost in the first round to Martin Damm and Cyril Suk.

Karsten Braasch and Andrei Olhovskiy won in the final 6–3, 6–3 against Simon Aspelin and Andrew Kratzmann.

== Seeds ==
1. (India) Mahesh Bhupathi / (Belarus) Max Mirnyi (semifinals)
2. (Czech Republic) David Rikl / (Netherlands) Sjeng Schalken (semifinals)
3. (Czech Republic) Martin Damm / (Czech Republic) Cyril Suk (quarterfinals)
4. (Czech Republic) Tomáš Cibulec / (Czech Republic) Pavel Vízner (first round)

== Draw ==
=== Key ===
- Q = Qualifier
- WC = Wild card
- LL = Lucky loser
- Alt = Alternate
- SE = Special exempt
- PR = Protected ranking
- ITF = ITF entry
- JE = Junior exempt
- w/o = Walkover
- r = Retired
- d = Defaulted
- SR = Special ranking

First round

Quarterfinals

Semifinals

Final

1
- (India) M Bhupathi
- (Belarus) M Mirnyi
2
6
[10]

WC
- (Israel) H Levy
- (Brazil) F Meligeni
6
1
[8]

1
- (India) M Bhupathi
- (Belarus) M Mirnyi
6
7^{7}

WC
- (Portugal) E Couto
- (Portugal) B Mota
6
1
[10]

WC
- (Portugal) E Couto
- (Portugal) B Mota
3
6^{4}

- (Argentina) A Calleri
- (Slovakia) D Hrbatý
3
6
[8]

1
- (India) M Bhupathi
- (Belarus) M Mirnyi
6
6^{5}
[8]

4
- (Czech Republic) T Cibulec
- (Czech Republic) P Vízner
5
6
[8]

- (Germany) K Braasch
- (Russia) A Olhovskiy
1
7^{7}
[10]

- (Italy) A Gaudenzi
- (Argentina) D Nalbandian
7
4
[10]

- (Italy) A Gaudenzi
- (Argentina) D Nalbandian
6
4
[8]

- (Germany) K Braasch
- (Russia) A Olhovskiy
7^{7}
6^{5}
[10]

- (Germany) K Braasch
- (Russia) A Olhovskiy
3
6
[10]

WC
- (Portugal) H Lopes
- (Portugal) N Marques
6^{3}
7^{7}
[3]

- (Germany) K Braasch
- (Russia) A Olhovskiy
6
6

- (Argentina) D Orsanic
- (Argentina) M Rodríguez
3
5

- (Sweden) S Aspelin
- (Australia) A Kratzmann
3
3

- (Sweden) S Aspelin
- (Australia) A Kratzmann
6
7

- (Sweden) S Aspelin
- (Australia) A Kratzmann
3
6
[10]

- (Czech Republic) L Friedl
- (Czech Republic) R Štěpánek
2
2

3
- (Czech Republic) M Damm
- (Czech Republic) C Suk
6
4
[4]

3
- (Czech Republic) M Damm
- (Czech Republic) C Suk
6
6

- (Sweden) S Aspelin
- (Australia) A Kratzmann
7
2
[10]

- (United States) D Bowen
- (Australia) A Fisher
6
1
[10]

2
- (Czech Republic) D Rikl
- (Netherlands) S Schalken
5
6
[4]

- (South Africa) C Haggard
- (Belgium) T Vanhoudt
4
6
[6]

- (United States) D Bowen
- (Australia) A Fisher
2
3

- (Australia) A Florent
- (Australia) D Macpherson
3
3

2
- (Czech Republic) D Rikl
- (Netherlands) S Schalken
6
6

2
- (Czech Republic) D Rikl
- (Netherlands) S Schalken
6
6
