= 1997 Estoril Open – Singles =

Singles
- 1997 Estoril Open

Final
- Champion: (Spain) Àlex Corretja
- Runner-up: (Spain) Francisco Clavet
- Score: 6–3, 7–5

Details
- Draw: 32
- Seeds: 8

Events
| Singles | Doubles |
| ← 1996 · | Estoril Open | · 1998 → |

Thomas Muster was the defending champion, but did not participate this year.

Àlex Corretja won the tournament, beating Francisco Clavet in the final, 6–3, 7–5.

== Seeds ==
1. (Russia) Yevgeny Kafelnikov (first round)
2. (Spain) Carlos Moyá (quarterfinals)
3. (South Africa) Wayne Ferreira (first round)
4. (Spain) Félix Mantilla (semifinals)
5. (Spain) Alberto Berasategui (quarterfinals)
6. (Spain) Àlex Corretja (champion)
7. (Spain) Francisco Clavet (final)
8. (Spain) Javier Sánchez (semifinals)

== Draw ==
=== Key ===
- Q = Qualifier
- WC = Wild card
- LL = Lucky loser
- Alt = Alternate
- SE = Special exempt
- PR = Protected ranking
- ITF = ITF entry
- JE = Junior exempt
- w/o = Walkover
- r = Retired
- d = Defaulted
- SR = Special ranking

=== Finals ===
Semifinals
8 | (Spain) Javier Sánchez | 3 | 1
6 | (Spain) Àlex Corretja | 6 | 6
4 | (Spain) Félix Mantilla | 6 | 5 | 0
7 | (Spain) Francisco Clavet | 3 | 7 | 6

Final
6 | (Spain) Àlex Corretja | 6 | 7
7 | (Spain) Francisco Clavet | 3 | 5

=== Top half ===
First round
1 | (Russia) Y Kafelnikov | 2 | 0
(Austria) G Schaller | 6 | 6
WC | (Portugal) N Marques | 7 | 6
Q | (Spain) Á López Morón | 5 | 2
Q | (France) F Fontang | 7 | 7
(Germany) M-K Goellner | 5 | 5
WC | (Portugal) B Fragoso | 2 | 2
8 | (Spain) J Sánchez | 6 | 6
3 | (South Africa) W Ferreira | 3 | 6 | 4
Q | (Argentina) F Cabello | 6 | 3 | 6
(France) F Santoro | 2 | 7^{7} | 6
(Slovakia) K Kučera | 6 | 6^{1} | 2
(Spain) JA Viloca-Puig | 6 | 6^{6} | 1
(Uruguay) M Filippini | 3 | 7^{8} | 6
(Argentina) H Gumy | 2 | 3
6 | (Spain) Á Corretja | 6 | 6

Second round
(Austria) G Schaller | 6 | 7
WC | (Portugal) N Marques | 3 | 5
Q | (France) F Fontang | 4 | 6 | 5
8 | (Spain) J Sánchez | 6 | 3 | 7
Q | (Argentina) F Cabello | 1 | 2
(France) F Santoro | 6 | 6
(Uruguay) M Filippini | 4 | 6 | 1
6 | (Spain) Á Corretja | 6 | 4 | 6

Quarterfinals
(Austria) G Schaller | 0 | 1^{r}
8 | (Spain) J Sánchez | 6 | 4
(France) F Santoro | 3 | 0^{r}
6 | (Spain) Á Corretja | 6 | 4

Semifinals
8 | (Spain) J Sánchez | 3 | 1
6 | (Spain) Á Corretja | 6 | 6

=== Bottom half ===
First round
5 | (Spain) A Berasategui | 3 | 6 | 6
(Spain) C Costa | 6 | 2 | 2
(Norway) C Ruud | 6 | 6
(Morocco) K Alami | 3 | 1
(Morocco) H Arazi | 6 | 5 | 6
WC | (Portugal) B Mota | 4 | 7 | 2
(Spain) R Carretero | 3 | 1
4 | (Spain) F Mantilla | 6 | 6
7 | (Spain) F Clavet | 3 | 6 | 6
(Italy) A Gaudenzi | 6 | 3 | 2
(Brazil) G Kuerten | 6 | 6
(Brazil) F Meligeni | 4 | 2
(Romania) A Voinea | 6 | 2 | 2
(Australia) R Fromberg | 4 | 6 | 6
Q | (Spain) J Díaz | 4 | 6 | 5
2 | (Spain) C Moyá | 6 | 1 | 7

Second round
5 | (Spain) A Berasategui | 6 | 6
(Norway) C Ruud | 4 | 1
(Morocco) H Arazi | 2 | 3
4 | (Spain) F Mantilla | 6 | 6
7 | (Spain) F Clavet | 1 | 6 | 7^{7}
(Brazil) G Kuerten | 6 | 1 | 6^{5}
(Australia) R Fromberg | 2 | 3
2 | (Spain) C Moyá | 6 | 6

Quarterfinals
5 | (Spain) A Berasategui | 4 | 1
4 | (Spain) F Mantilla | 6 | 6
7 | (Spain) F Clavet | 6 | 6
2 | (Spain) C Moyá | 1 | 3

Semifinals
4 | (Spain) F Mantilla | 6 | 5 | 0
7 | (Spain) F Clavet | 3 | 7 | 6
