= 1993 Estoril Open – Doubles =

Doubles
- 1993 Estoril Open

Final
- Champions: (South Africa) David Adams (Russia) Andrei Olhovskiy
- Runners-up: (Netherlands) Menno Oosting (Germany) Udo Riglewski
- Score: 6–3, 7–5

Events
Singles	Doubles
← 1992 ·	Estoril Open	· 1994 →

Hendrik Jan Davids and Libor Pimek were the defending champions, but lost in the first round this year.

David Adams and Andrei Olhovskiy won in the final, 6–3, 7–5, against Menno Oosting and Udo Riglewski.

== Seeds ==
1. (South Africa) Danie Visser / (Australia) Laurie Warder (first round)
2. (United States) Steve DeVries / (Australia) David Macpherson (first round)
3. (Netherlands) Tom Nijssen / (Czech Republic) Cyril Suk (quarterfinals)
4. (Netherlands) Jacco Eltingh / (Netherlands) Paul Haarhuis (quarterfinals)

== Draw ==
=== Key ===
- Q = Qualifier
- WC = Wild card
- LL = Lucky loser
- Alt = Alternate
- ITF = ITF entry
- PR = Protected ranking
- SR = Special ranking
- SE = Special exempt
- JE = Junior exempt
- JR = Junior Accelerator Programme entrant
- CO = College Accelerator Programme entrant
- NG = Next Gen Accelerator Program entrant
- w/o = Walkover
- r = Retired
- d = Defaulted

=== Draw ===
First round
1	(South Africa) D Visser (Australia) L Warder	6	2
(Netherlands) M Oosting (Germany) U Riglewski	7	6
Q	(United States) T.J. Middleton (Sweden) L-A Wahlgren	5	6	6
(United States) B Garnett (Australia) C Limberger	7	2	4
3	(Netherlands) T Nijssen (Czech Republic) C Suk	6	6
WC	(United States) I Lendl (Portugal) B Mota	2	1
(United States) S Cannon (United States) S Melville	4	3
(Czech Republic) K Nováček (Spain) J Sánchez	6	6
(South Africa) D Adams (Russia) A Olhovskiy	6	6
WC	(Portugal) J Cunha e Silva (Portugal) N Marques	4	4
(Netherlands) HJ Davids (Belgium) L Pimek	7	6	4
4	(Netherlands) J Eltingh (Netherlands) P Haarhuis	5	7	6
(Spain) S Casal (Spain) E Sánchez	6	1	6
(United States) M Bauer (South Africa) P Norval	1	6	3
(Spain) T Carbonell (United States) G Van Emburgh	6	7
2	(United States) S DeVries (Australia) D Macpherson	2	6

Quarterfinals
(Netherlands) M Oosting (Germany) U Riglewski	4	6	6
Q	(United States) T.J. Middleton (Sweden) L-A Wahlgren	6	4	2
3	(Netherlands) T Nijssen (Czech Republic) C Suk	4	4
(Czech Republic) K Nováček (Spain) J Sánchez	6	6
(South Africa) D Adams (Russia) A Olhovskiy	6	6
4	(Netherlands) J Eltingh (Netherlands) P Haarhuis	2	2
(Spain) S Casal (Spain) E Sánchez	6	6
(Spain) T Carbonell (United States) G Van Emburgh	3	3

Semifinals
(Netherlands) M Oosting (Germany) U Riglewski	6	7
(Czech Republic) K Nováček (Spain) J Sánchez	4	6
(South Africa) D Adams (Russia) A Olhovskiy	7	3	6
(Spain) S Casal (Spain) E Sánchez	6	6	3

Final
(Netherlands) M Oosting (Germany) U Riglewski	3	5
(South Africa) D Adams (Russia) A Olhovskiy	6	7
