= 1994 Estoril Open – Singles =

Singles
- 1994 Estoril Open

Final
- Champion: (Spain) Carlos Costa
- Runner-up: (Ukraine) Andrei Medvedev
- Score: 4–6, 7–5, 6–4

Details
- Draw: 32
- Seeds: 8

Events
Singles	Doubles
← 1993 ·	Estoril Open	· 1995 →

Andrei Medvedev was the defending champion, and finished runner-up this year.

Carlos Costa won the tournament, beating Medvedev in the final, 4–6, 7–5, 6–4.

== Seeds ==
1. (Spain) Sergi Bruguera (quarterfinals, retired)
2. (Ukraine) Andrei Medvedev (final)
3. (Spain) Carlos Costa (champion)
4. (Germany) Marc-Kevin Goellner (second round, retired)
5. (Spain) Javier Sánchez (semifinals)
6. (Russia) Yevgeny Kafelnikov (first round)
7. (Italy) Renzo Furlan (second round)
8. (Sweden) Jonas Svensson (first round)

== Draw ==
=== Key ===
- Q = Qualifier
- WC = Wild card
- LL = Lucky loser
- Alt = Alternate
- SE = Special exempt
- PR = Protected ranking
- ITF = ITF entry
- JE = Junior exempt
- w/o = Walkover
- r = Retired
- d = Defaulted
- SR = Special ranking

=== Finals ===
Semifinals
Q	(Spain) Albert Costa	3	6	5
3	(Spain) Carlos Costa	6	4	7
5	(Spain) Javier Sánchez	2	6	4
2	(Ukraine) Andrei Medvedev	6	4	6

Final
3	(Spain) Carlos Costa	4	7	6
2	(Ukraine) Andrei Medvedev	6	5	4

=== Top half ===
First round
1	(Spain) S Bruguera	6	6
(Haiti) R Agénor	4	4
(Argentina) F Davín	6	2	6
(Argentina) H de la Peña	4	6	6^{r}
WC	(Portugal) E Couto	7	6
(Czech Republic) D Rikl	5	1
Q	(Spain) A Costa	0	6	6
8	(Sweden) J Svensson	6	4	2
3	(Spain) C Costa	6	6
(Russia) A Cherkasov	3	2
Q	(France) J Golmard	6^{3}	7^{7}	7
(Germany) B Karbacher	7^{7}	6^{3}	5
(Austria) H Skoff	1	r
Q	(Spain) F Sánchez	6
(Italy) A Gaudenzi	6	6
6	(Russia) Y Kafelnikov	2	4

Second round
1	(Spain) S Bruguera	1	6	6
(Argentina) F Davín	6	1	0
WC	(Portugal) E Couto	1	2
Q	(Spain) A Costa	6	6
3	(Spain) C Costa	3	7	6
Q	(France) J Golmard	6	5	4
Q	(Spain) F Sánchez	3	2
(Italy) A Gaudenzi	6	6

Quarterfinals
1	(Spain) S Bruguera	2	3^{r}
Q	(Spain) A Costa	6	4
3	(Spain) C Costa	6	6
(Italy) A Gaudenzi	0	0

Semifinals
Q	(Spain) A Costa	3	6	5
3	(Spain) C Costa	6	4	7

=== Bottom half ===
First round
5	(Spain) J Sánchez	6	6
(Austria) G Schaller	3	1
WC	(Portugal) N Marques	2	6^{3}
(Czech Republic) S Doseděl	6	7^{7}
(Spain) J Burillo	7	1	2
(Spain) E Sánchez	5	6	6
(Morocco) Y El Aynaoui	4	2
4	(Germany) M-K Goellner	6	6
7	(Italy) R Furlan	6	6
(Spain) J Arrese	2	2
Q	(Spain) JF Altur	1	4
(Spain) A Berasategui	6	6
(Spain) À Corretja	6	6
(Australia) R Fromberg	2	2
WC	(Portugal) J Cunha e Silva	3	5
2	(Ukraine) A Medvedev	6	7

Second round
5	(Spain) J Sánchez	7^{7}	6
(Czech Republic) S Doseděl	6^{5}	4
(Spain) E Sánchez	6
4	(Germany) M-K Goellner	4	r
7	(Italy) R Furlan	5	3
(Spain) A Berasategui	7	6
(Spain) À Corretja	4	6^{5}
2	(Ukraine) A Medvedev	6	7^{7}

Quarterfinals
5	(Spain) J Sánchez	6	6
(Spain) E Sánchez	2	2
(Spain) A Berasategui	7	2	4
2	(Ukraine) A Medvedev	5	6	6

Semifinals
5	(Spain) J Sánchez	2	6	4
2	(Ukraine) A Medvedev	6	4	6
