= 1995 Estoril Open – Singles =

Singles
- 1995 Estoril Open

Final
- Champion: (Austria) Thomas Muster
- Runner-up: (Spain) Albert Costa
- Score: 6–4, 6–2

Details
- Draw: 32
- Seeds: 8

Events
Singles	Doubles
← 1994 ·	Estoril Open	· 1996 →

Carlos Costa was the defending champion, but lost in the first round this year.

Thomas Muster won the tournament, beating Albert Costa in the final, 6–4, 6–2.

== Seeds ==
1. (Spain) Alberto Berasategui (first round)
2. (Ukraine) Andrei Medvedev (quarterfinals)
3. (Austria) Thomas Muster (champion)
4. (Italy) Andrea Gaudenzi (second round)
5. (Spain) Àlex Corretja (second round)
6. (Czech Republic) Karel Nováček (second round)
7. (Czech Republic) Slava Doseděl (second round)
8. (Spain) Carlos Costa (first round)

== Draw ==
=== Key ===
- Q = Qualifier
- WC = Wild card
- LL = Lucky loser
- Alt = Alternate
- ITF = ITF entry
- PR = Protected ranking
- SR = Special ranking
- SE = Special exempt
- JE = Junior exempt
- JR = Junior Accelerator Programme entrant
- CO = College Accelerator Programme entrant
- NG = Next Gen Accelerator Program entrant
- w/o = Walkover
- r = Retired
- d = Defaulted

=== Finals ===
Semifinals
(Spain) Emilio Sánchez	2	4
3	(Austria) Thomas Muster	6	6
(France) Fabrice Santoro	1	0
(Spain) Albert Costa	6	6

Final
3	(Austria) Thomas Muster	6	6
(Spain) Albert Costa	4	2

=== Top half ===
First round
1	(Spain) A Berasategui	4	5
WC	(Portugal) N Marques	6	7
(Spain) F Clavet	6	6
Q	(Spain) J Burillo	4	4
(Spain) E Sánchez	6	6^{3}	7^{7}
(Peru) J Yzaga	3	7^{7}	6^{3}
(United States) B Shelton	6	2	7^{7}
8	(Spain) C Costa	4	6	6^{3}
3	(Austria) T Muster	6	6
(Spain) O Martinez	4	1
(France) C Pioline	4	5
(Argentina) F Davín	6	7
(Norway) C Ruud	2	1
(Spain) J Sánchez	6	6
WC	(Portugal) E Couto	2	5
6	(Czech Republic) K Nováček	6	7

Second round
WC	(Portugal) N Marques	5	6	6
(Spain) F Clavet	7	3	3
(Spain) E Sánchez	7^{7}	6
(United States) B Shelton	6^{1}	4
3	(Austria) T Muster	7	6
(Argentina) F Davín	5	1
(Spain) J Sánchez	6	6
6	(Czech Republic) K Nováček	3	4

Quarterfinals
WC	(Portugal) N Marques	6	4	3
(Spain) E Sánchez	4	6	6
3	(Austria) T Muster	4	7^{7}	6
(Spain) J Sánchez	6	6^{3}	4

Semifinals
(Spain) E Sánchez	2	4
3	(Austria) T Muster	6	6

=== Bottom half ===
First round
5	(Spain) À Corretja	6	6
(Slovakia) K Kučera	0	2
(France) F Santoro	6	6
(Austria) H Skoff	4	3
(Austria) G Schaller	7	6
Q	(Germany) M-K Goellner	5	1
WC	(France) H Leconte	1	5
4	(Italy) A Gaudenzi	6	7
7	(Czech Republic) S Doseděl	5	6	7^{7}
(Germany) O Gross	7	1	6^{3}
(Spain) A Costa	6	6
(United States) M Washington	3	4
(Spain) T Carbonell	2	4
Q	(Czech Republic) B Ulihrach	6	6
Q	(Spain) J Arrese	6	6^{6}	3
2	(Ukraine) A Medvedev	4	7^{8}	6

Second round
5	(Spain) À Corretja	3	4
(France) F Santoro	6	6
(Austria) G Schaller	7^{7}	6
4	(Italy) A Gaudenzi	6^{2}	2
7	(Czech Republic) S Doseděl	1	0
(Spain) A Costa	6	6
Q	(Czech Republic) B Ulihrach	3	6^{1}
2	(Ukraine) A Medvedev	6	7^{7}

Quarterfinals
(France) F Santoro	6	6
(Austria) G Schaller	4	3
(Spain) A Costa	6	6
2	(Ukraine) A Medvedev	2	3

Semifinals
(France) F Santoro	1	0
(Spain) A Costa	6	6
