= 1994 Estoril Open =

- Date: 28 March – 4 April
- Edition: 5th
- Category: World Series
- Draw: 32S / 16D
- Prize money: $500,000
- Surface: Clay / outdoor
- Location: Oeiras, Portugal

Champions

Singles
- (Spain) Carlos Costa

Doubles
- (Italy) Cristian Brandi / (Italy) Federico Mordegan
- Estoril Open

The 1994 Estoril Open was a tennis tournament played on outdoor clay courts. This event was the 5th edition of the Estoril Open, included in the 1994 ATP Tour World Series. The event took place at the Estoril Court Central, in Oeiras, Portugal, from 28 March through 4 April 1994. Third-seeded Carlos Costa won the singles title, his second at the event after 1992.

== Finals ==
=== Singles ===
(Spain) Carlos Costa defeated (Ukraine) Andrei Medvedev, 4–6, 7–5, 6–4

- It was Costa's 1st singles title of the year and 5th of his career. It was his 2nd title at Estoril.

=== Doubles ===
(Italy) Cristian Brandi / (Italy) Federico Mordegan defeated (Netherlands) Richard Krajicek / (Netherlands) Menno Oosting, W/O
