= 1998 Estoril Open – Men's singles =

Men's singles
- 1998 Estoril Open

Final
- Champion: (Spain) Alberto Berasategui
- Runner-up: (Austria) Thomas Muster
- Score: 3–6, 6–1, 6–3

Details
- Draw: 32
- Seeds: 8

Events
| Singles | men | women |
| Doubles | men | women |
| ← 1997 · | Estoril Open | · 1999 → |

Àlex Corretja was the defending champion, but did not participate this year.

Alberto Berasategui won the tournament, beating Thomas Muster in the final, 3–6, 6–1, 6–3.

== Seeds ==
1. (Spain) Félix Mantilla (quarterfinals)
2. (Spain) Carlos Moyá (semifinals)
3. (Spain) Alberto Berasategui (champion)
4. (Spain) Albert Costa (quarterfinals)
5. (France) Fabrice Santoro (first round)
6. (Austria) Thomas Muster (final)
7. (Spain) Francisco Clavet (first round)
8. (Spain) Albert Portas (first round)

== Draw ==
=== Key ===
- Q = Qualifier
- WC = Wild card
- LL = Lucky loser
- Alt = Alternate
- SE = Special exempt
- PR = Protected ranking
- ITF = ITF entry
- JE = Junior exempt
- w/o = Walkover
- r = Retired
- d = Defaulted
- SR = Special ranking

=== Finals ===
Semifinals
(Morocco) Karim Alami | 6 | 2 | 4
6 | (Austria) Thomas Muster | 3 | 6 | 6
3 | (Spain) Alberto Berasategui | 6 | 6
2 | (Spain) Carlos Moyá | 1 | 1

Final
6 | (Austria) Thomas Muster | 6 | 1 | 3
3 | (Spain) Alberto Berasategui | 3 | 6 | 6

=== Top half ===
First round
1 | (Spain) F Mantilla | 6 | 6
(Spain) J Sánchez | 1 | 3
(Spain) G Blanco | 6^{4} | 4
(Italy) A Gaudenzi | 7^{7} | 6
(Sweden) T Nydahl | 1 | 0^{r}
(Czech Republic) S Doseděl | 6 | 3
(Morocco) K Alami | 6 | 6
7 | (Spain) F Clavet | 4 | 3
4 | (Spain) A Costa | 7^{9} | 6
(Spain) J Burillo | 6^{7} | 0
(Czech Republic) J Novák | 4 | 6 | 7^{7}
(Morocco) H Arazi | 6 | 0 | 6^{3}
WC | (Portugal) N Marques | 3 | 0
(Brazil) F Meligeni | 6 | 6
(Romania) D Pescariu | 5 | 1
6 | (Austria) T Muster | 7 | 6

Second round
1 | (Spain) F Mantilla | 6 | 1 | 7^{8}
(Italy) A Gaudenzi | 1 | 6 | 6^{6}
(Czech Republic) S Doseděl | 4 | 6 | 6^{10}
(Morocco) K Alami | 6 | 4 | 7^{12}
4 | (Spain) A Costa | 6 | 6
(Czech Republic) J Novák | 3 | 4
(Brazil) F Meligeni | 5 | 3
6 | (Austria) T Muster | 7 | 6

Quarterfinals
1 | (Spain) F Mantilla | 6 | 5 | 1
(Morocco) K Alami | 3 | 7 | 6
4 | (Spain) A Costa | 4 | 4
6 | (Austria) T Muster | 6 | 6

Semifinals
(Morocco) K Alami | 6 | 2 | 4
6 | (Austria) T Muster | 3 | 6 | 6

=== Bottom half ===
First round
5 | (France) F Santoro | 2 | 7 | 0
(Spain) J Alonso | 6 | 5 | 6
Q | (Costa Rica) JA Marín | 6 | 7^{7}
WC | (Portugal) B Mota | 0 | 6^{5}
(Belgium) F Dewulf | 7^{7} | 6
(Australia) R Fromberg | 6^{4} | 3
Q | (Spain) J Muñoz | 4 | 4
3 | (Spain) A Berasategui | 6 | 6
8 | (Spain) A Portas | 6^{5} | 3
(Spain) JA Viloca-Puig | 7^{7} | 6
(Spain) C Costa | 6 | 6
Q | (Spain) A Martín | 3 | 3
(Germany) M-K Goellner | 6 | 7
Q | (Spain) J Imaz-Ruiz | 4 | 5
(Czech Republic) B Ulihrach | 3 | 6 | 4
2 | (Spain) C Moyá | 6 | 4 | 6

Second round
(Spain) J Alonso | 2 | 4
Q | (Costa Rica) JA Marín | 6 | 6
(Belgium) F Dewulf | 4 | 7 | 5
3 | (Spain) A Berasategui | 6 | 5 | 7
(Spain) JA Viloca-Puig | 2 | 6 | 2
(Spain) C Costa | 6 | 3 | 6
(Germany) M-K Goellner | 3 | 2
2 | (Spain) C Moyá | 6 | 6

Quarterfinals
Q | (Costa Rica) JA Marín | 6 | 4 | 3
3 | (Spain) A Berasategui | 3 | 6 | 6
(Spain) C Costa | 6^{3} | 7^{7} | 2
2 | (Spain) C Moyá | 7^{7} | 6^{5} | 6

Semifinals
3 | (Spain) A Berasategui | 6 | 6
2 | (Spain) C Moyá | 1 | 1
