= 1993 Estoril Open =

- Date: 29 March – 5 April
- Edition: 4th
- Category: World Series
- Draw: 32S / 16D
- Prize money: $500,000
- Surface: Clay / outdoor
- Location: Oeiras, Portugal

Champions

Singles
- (Ukraine) Andriy Medvedev

Doubles
- (South Africa) David Adams / (Russia) Andrei Olhovskiy
- Estoril Open

The 1993 Estoril Open was a tennis tournament played on outdoor clay courts. This event was the 4th edition of the Estoril Open, included in the 1993 ATP Tour World Series. The event took place at the Estoril Court Central, in Oeiras, Portugal, from 29 March through 5 April 1993. Fifth-seeded Andriy Medvedev won the singles title.

== Finals ==
=== Singles ===
(Ukraine) Andriy Medvedev defeated (Czech Republic) Karel Nováček, 6–4, 6–2

- It was Medvedev's 1st singles title of the year and 4th of his career.

=== Doubles ===
(South Africa) David Adams / (Russia) Andrei Olhovskiy defeated (Netherlands) Menno Oosting / (Germany) Udo Riglewski, 6–3, 7–5

- It was Adams' 2nd title of the year and 3rd of his career. It was Olhovskiy's 2nd title of the year and 2nd of his career.
