= 2002 Estoril Open – Women's singles =

Women's singles
- 2002 Estoril Open

Final
- Champion: (Spain) Magüi Serna
- Runner-up: (Germany) Anca Barna
- Score: 6–4, 6–2

Details
- Draw: 32 (2WC/4Q)
- Seeds: 8

Events
Singles	men	women
Doubles	men	women
- Portugal Open

Ángeles Montolio was the defending champion, but lost in quarterfinals to Anca Barna.

Magüi Serna won the title by defeating Barna 6–4, 6–2 in the final.

== Seeds ==
1. (Spain) Ángeles Montolio (quarterfinals)
2. (Spain) Cristina Torrens Valero (first round)
3. (Slovakia) Martina Suchá (first round)
4. (Spain) Magüi Serna (champion)
5. (Slovenia) Tina Pisnik (quarterfinals)
6. (Hungary) Petra Mandula (second round)
7. (Slovenia) Katarina Srebotnik (second round)
8. (Greece) Eleni Daniilidou (first round)

== Draw ==
Key

- Q = Qualifier
- WC = Wild card
- LL = Lucky loser
- Alt = Alternate
- ITF = ITF entry
- PR = Protected ranking
- SR = Special ranking
- SE = Special exempt
- JE = Junior exempt
- JR = Junior Accelerator Programme entrant
- CO = College Accelerator Programme entrant
- NG = Next Gen Accelerator Program entrant
- w/o = Walkover
- r = Retired
- d = Defaulted

=== Finals ===
Semifinals
Q	(Germany) Anca Barna	7^{8}	6
WC	(Russia) Dinara Safina	6^{6}	4
4	(Spain) Magüi Serna	6	6
(Russia) Elena Bovina	3	3

Final
Q	(Germany) Anca Barna	4	2
4	(Spain) Magüi Serna	6	6

=== Top half ===
First round
1	(Spain) Á Montolio	6	6
(Kazakhstan) I Selyutina	3	0
WC	(Portugal) N Silva	2	2
(France) C Beigbeder	6	6
Q	(Germany) A Barna	6	6
Q	(Czech Republic) L Průšová	2	1
(Netherlands) S Noorlander	4	2
7	(Slovenia) K Srebotnik	6	6
3	(Slovakia) M Suchá	3	6	1
WC	(Russia) D Safina	6	3	6
(Netherlands) M Oremans	6	6
(Tunisia) S Sfar	4	3
(Slovenia) M Matevžič	6	7^{9}
(Germany) B Rittner	4	6^{7}
(Croatia) S Talaja	4	3
6	(Hungary) P Mandula	6	6

Second round
1	(Spain) Á Montolio	6	6
(France) C Beigbeder	2	2
Q	(Germany) A Barna	7	4	6
7	(Slovenia) K Srebotnik	5	6	3
WC	(Russia) D Safina	6	7^{7}
(Netherlands) M Oremans	1	6^{5}
(Slovenia) M Matevžič	6	6
6	(Hungary) P Mandula	4	1

Quarterfinals
1	(Spain) Á Montolio	4	6^{0}
Q	(Germany) A Barna	6	7^{7}
WC	(Russia) D Safina	6	7
(Slovenia) M Matevžič	0	5

Semifinals
Q	(Germany) A Barna	7^{8}	6
WC	(Russia) D Safina	6^{6}	4

=== Bottom half ===
First round
5	(Slovenia) T Pisnik	6	4	6
(Germany) M Müller	0	6	4
(Spain) E Bes	4	0
(Czech Republic) A Gerši	6	6
(Germany) J Kandarr	6^{3}	2
(Slovakia) Ľ Cervanová	7^{7}	6
(Hungary) Z Gubacsi	6	4	3
4	(Spain) M Serna	1	6	6
8	(Greece) E Daniilidou	4	6^{5}
(Russia) E Bovina	6	7^{7}
(Austria) B Schwartz	6	6
(Zimbabwe) C Black	4	4
Q	(Bulgaria) L Bacheva	4	6^{6}
(Hungary) R Kuti-Kis	6	7^{8}
Q	(Spain) L Domínguez Lino	7	6
2	(Spain) C Torrens Valero	5	1

Second round
5	(Slovenia) T Pisnik	6	6
(Czech Republic) A Gerši	4	2
(Slovakia) Ľ Cervanová	3	2
4	(Spain) M Serna	6	6
(Russia) E Bovina	6	4	7^{7}
(Austria) B Schwartz	4	6	6^{5}
(Hungary) R Kuti-Kis	3	4
Q	(Spain) L Domínguez Lino	6	6

Quarterfinals
5	(Slovenia) T Pisnik	2	0
4	(Spain) M Serna	6	6
(Russia) E Bovina	6	6
Q	(Spain) L Domínguez Lino	3	2

Semifinals
4	(Spain) M Serna	6	6
(Russia) E Bovina	3	3
