= 1999 Estoril Open – Men's singles =

Men's singles
- 1999 Estoril Open

Final
- Champion: (Spain) Albert Costa
- Runner-up: (United States) Todd Martin
- Score: 7–6^{(7–4)}, 2–6, 6–3

Details
- Draw: 32
- Seeds: 8

Events
Singles	men	women
Doubles	men	women
← 1998 ·	Estoril Open	· 2000 →

Alberto Berasategui was the defending champion, but lost in the first round this year.

Albert Costa won the tournament, beating Todd Martin in the final, 7–6^{(7–4)}, 2–6, 6–3.

== Seeds ==
1. (Russia) Yevgeny Kafelnikov (first round)
2. (United States) Todd Martin (final)
3. (Chile) Marcelo Ríos (semifinals)
4. (Spain) Albert Costa (champion)
5. (Brazil) Gustavo Kuerten (quarterfinals)
6. (Spain) Félix Mantilla (quarterfinals)
7. (Spain) Francisco Clavet (first round)
8. (Russia) Marat Safin (first round)

== Draw ==
=== Key ===
- Q = Qualifier
- WC = Wild card
- LL = Lucky loser
- Alt = Alternate
- SE = Special exempt
- PR = Protected ranking
- ITF = ITF entry
- JE = Junior exempt
- w/o = Walkover
- r = Retired
- d = Defaulted
- SR = Special ranking

=== Finals ===
Semifinals
(France) Jérôme Golmard	4	4
4	(Spain) Albert Costa	6	6
3	(Chile) Marcelo Ríos	3	6^{3}
2	(United States) Todd Martin	6	7^{7}

Final
4	(Spain) Albert Costa	7^{7}	2	6
2	(United States) Todd Martin	6^{4}	6	3

=== Top half ===
First round
1	(Russia) Y Kafelnikov	3	6	3
(Romania) A Pavel	6	2	6
Q	(Spain) Á López Morón	4	0
(Morocco) K Alami	6	6
(Belgium) F Dewulf	2	1
(United States) V Spadea	6	6
(France) J Golmard	7^{7}	7^{7}
7	(Spain) F Clavet	6^{3}	6^{5}
4	(Spain) A Costa	6	6
(Argentina) F Squillari	1	3
(Spain) F Vicente	1	4
Q	(Haiti) R Agénor	6	6
WC	(Spain) C Costa	6	2	6^{4}
(Ukraine) A Medvedev	1	6	7^{7}
(Austria) T Muster	3	2
6	(Spain) F Mantilla	6	6

Second round
(Romania) A Pavel	6	3	2
(Morocco) K Alami	3	6	6
(United States) V Spadea	3	2
(France) J Golmard	6	6
4	(Spain) A Costa	7^{7}	7^{9}
Q	(Haiti) R Agénor	6^{5}	6^{7}
(Ukraine) A Medvedev	3	2
6	(Spain) F Mantilla	6	6

Quarterfinals
(Morocco) K Alami	4	6^{1}
(France) J Golmard	6	7^{7}
4	(Spain) A Costa	6	6
6	(Spain) F Mantilla	2	4

Semifinals
(France) J Golmard	4	4
4	(Spain) A Costa	6	6

=== Bottom half ===
First round
5	(Brazil) G Kuerten	6	6^{5}	6
(Costa Rica) JA Marín	3	7^{7}	4
(Czech Republic) J Novák	7^{7}	6
(Spain) G Blanco	6^{1}	3
Q	(Spain) A Portas	6	6
WC	(Portugal) P Leão	1	1
(Romania) A Voinea	6	4	2
3	(Chile) M Ríos	3	6	6
8	(Russia) M Safin	6^{6}	7	3
(Morocco) H Arazi	7^{8}	5	6
(Brazil) F Meligeni	6	6
(France) A Di Pasquale	2	2
WC	(Portugal) N Marques	6	3	6
Q	(France) G Solvès	2	6	3
(Spain) A Berasategui	1	6^{3}
2	(United States) T Martin	6	7^{7}

Second round
5	(Brazil) G Kuerten	6	6
(Czech Republic) J Novák	3	4
Q	(Spain) A Portas	3	3
3	(Chile) M Ríos	6	6
(Morocco) H Arazi	2	2
(Brazil) F Meligeni	6	6
WC	(Portugal) N Marques	5	3
2	(United States) T Martin	7	6

Quarterfinals
5	(Brazil) G Kuerten	4	3
3	(Chile) M Ríos	6	6
(Brazil) F Meligeni	5^{d}
2	(United States) T Martin	4

Semifinals
3	(Chile) M Ríos	3	6^{3}
2	(United States) T Martin	6	7^{7}
