= 2002 Estoril Open – Women's doubles =

Women's doubles
- 2002 Estoril Open

Final
- Champions: (Russia) Elena Bovina; (Hungary) Zsófia Gubacsi
- Runners-up: (Germany) Barbara Rittner; (Venezuela) María Vento-Kabchi
- Score: 6–3, 6–1

Details
- Draw: 16 (1WC)
- Seeds: 4

Events
Singles	men	women
Doubles	men	women
← 2001 ·	Portugal Open	· 2003 →

Květa Hrdličková and Barbara Rittner were the defending champions, but Hrdličková chose to compete at Amelia Island during the same week, losing at the first round.

Rittner teamed up with María Vento-Kabchi and lost in the final to Elena Bovina and Zsófia Gubacsi 6–3, 6–1.

== Seeds ==
1. (Slovenia) Tina Križan / (Slovenia) Katarina Srebotnik (semifinals)
2. (Zimbabwe) Cara Black / (Kazakhstan) Irina Selyutina (quarterfinals)
3. (Spain) María José Martínez Sánchez / (Spain) Magüi Serna (first round)
4. (Germany) Barbara Rittner / (Venezuela) María Vento-Kabchi (final)

== Draw ==
=== Key ===
- Q = Qualifier
- WC = Wild card
- LL = Lucky loser
- Alt = Alternate
- SE = Special exempt
- PR = Protected ranking
- ITF = ITF entry
- JE = Junior exempt
- w/o = Walkover
- r = Retired
- d = Defaulted
- SR = Special ranking

=== Draw ===
First round

Quarterfinals

Semifinals

Final

1
- (Slovenia) T Križan
- (Slovenia) K Srebotnik
6
3
6

- (Greece) E Daniilidou
- (South Africa) K Grant
2
6
3

1
- (Slovenia) T Križan
- (Slovenia) K Srebotnik
6
6

WC
- (Portugal) A Cardoso
- (Portugal) C Correia
2
1

- (Slovenia) M Matevžič
- (Slovenia) T Pisnik
0
0

- (Slovenia) M Matevžič
- (Slovenia) T Pisnik
6
6

1
- (Slovenia) T Križan
- (Slovenia) K Srebotnik
3
6
3

3
- (Spain) MJ Martínez Sánchez
- (Spain) M Serna
2
6^{7}

- (Russia) E Bovina
- (Hungary) Z Gubacsi
6
2
6

- (Netherlands) K Boogert
- (Netherlands) M Oremans
6
7^{9}

- (Netherlands) K Boogert
- (Netherlands) M Oremans
4
5

- (Russia) E Bovina
- (Hungary) Z Gubacsi
4
7^{7}
6

- (Russia) E Bovina
- (Hungary) Z Gubacsi
6
7

- (Spain) G Riera
- (Italy) V Sassi
6
6^{3}
4

- (Russia) E Bovina
- (Hungary) Z Gubacsi
6
6

- (Estonia) M Ani
- (Germany) A Barna
6
6

4
- (Germany) B Rittner
- (Venezuela) M Vento-Kabchi
3
1

- (Germany) M Müller
- (Germany) A Roesch
3
1

- (Estonia) M Ani
- (Germany) A Barna
5
0

- (New Zealand) S Stephens
- (Spain) C Torrens Valero
4
3

4
- (Germany) B Rittner
- (Venezuela) M Vento-Kabchi
7
6

4
- (Germany) B Rittner
- (Venezuela) M Vento-Kabchi
6
6

4
- (Germany) B Rittner
- (Venezuela) M Vento-Kabchi
7
7

- (Hungary) P Mandula
- (Austria) B Schwartz
6
4
5

- (Spain) E Bes
- (Spain) L Domínguez Lino
5
5

- (Spain) E Bes
- (Spain) L Domínguez Lino
2
6
7

- (Spain) E Bes
- (Spain) L Domínguez Lino
6
3
7^{7}

- (Spain) RM Andrés Rodríguez
- (Spain) M Ramón Climent
7^{7}
2
5

2
- (Zimbabwe) C Black
- (Kazakhstan) I Selyutina
2
6
6^{4}

2
- (Zimbabwe) C Black
- (Kazakhstan) I Selyutina
6^{4}
6
7
