= 1999 Estoril Open =

- Date: 5–12 April
- Edition: 10th (men) / 3rd (women)
- Surface: Clay / outdoor
- Location: Oeiras, Portugal

Champions

Men's singles
- (Spain) Albert Costa

Women's singles
- (Slovenia) Katarina Srebotnik

Men's doubles
- (Spain) Tomás Carbonell / (United States) Donald Johnson

Women's doubles
- (Spain) Alicia Ortuño / (Spain) Cristina Torrens Valero
← 1998 ·	Estoril Open	· 2000 →

The 1999 Estoril Open was a tennis tournament played on outdoor clay courts at the Estoril Court Central in the Oeiras Municipality in Portugal that was part of the International Series of the 1999 ATP Tour and of Tier IVa of the 1999 WTA Tour. The tournament was held from 5 April until 12 April 1999. Albert Costa and Katarina Srebotnik won the singles title.

== Finals ==
=== Men's singles ===
(Spain) Albert Costa defeated (United States) Todd Martin, 7–6^{(7–4)}, 2–6, 6–3

- It was Costa's 1st title of the year and the 9th of his career.

=== Women's singles ===
(Slovenia) Katarina Srebotnik defeated (Hungary) Rita Kuti-Kis, 6–3, 6–1

- It was Srebotnik's 1st title of the year and the 2nd of her career.

=== Men's doubles ===
(Spain) Tomás Carbonell / (United States) Donald Johnson defeated (Czech Republic) Jiří Novák / (Czech Republic) David Rikl, 6–3, 2–6, 6–1

=== Women's doubles ===
(Spain) Alicia Ortuño / (Spain) Cristina Torrens Valero defeated (Hungary) Anna Földényi / (Hungary) Rita Kuti-Kis, 7–6^{(7–4)}, 3–6, 6–3

== WTA entrants ==
=== Seeds ===
- Ranking date: 29 March 1999

Country	Player	Rank	Seed
GER	Anke Huber	30	1
FRA	Sarah Pitkowski	43	2
LUX	Anne Kremer	44	3
GER	Elena Wagner	77	4
CRO	Silvija Talaja	81	5
BLR	Olga Barabanschikova	82	6
ITA	Laura Golarsa	89	7
NED	Seda Noorlander	91	8

=== Other entrants ===
The following players received wildcards into the singles main draw:

- (Portugal) Ana Catarina Nogueira
- (Brazil) Vanessa Menga

The following players received wildcards into the doubles main draw:

- (Portugal) Angela Cardoso / (Portugal) Cristina Correia

The following players received entry from the singles qualifying draw:

- (Germany) Anca Barna
- (Belgium) Laurence Courtois
- (Spain) Cristina Torrens Valero
- (Hungary) Anna Földényi

The following players received entry as a lucky loser:

- (Spain) Eva Bes Ostariz
- (Bulgaria) Lubomira Bacheva

The following player received entry from the doubles qualifying draw:

- (India) Nirupama Vaidyanathan / (Romania) Andreea Vanc
