= 2002 Estoril Open – Men's singles =

Men's singles
- 2002 Estoril Open

Final
- Champion: (Argentina) David Nalbandian
- Runner-up: (Finland) Jarkko Nieminen
- Score: 6–4, 7–6^{(7–5)}

Details
- Draw: 32
- Seeds: 8

Events
Singles	men	women
Doubles	men	women
- Estoril Open

Juan Carlos Ferrero was the defending champion but lost in the second round to David Nalbandian.

Nalbandian won in the final 6–4, 7–6^{(7–5)} against Jarkko Nieminen.

== Seeds ==
1. (Spain) Juan Carlos Ferrero (second round)
2. (Russia) Marat Safin (quarterfinals)
3. (Spain) Carlos Moyá (semifinals)
4. (Spain) Albert Costa (first round)
5. (Netherlands) Sjeng Schalken (quarterfinals)
6. (Belgium) Xavier Malisse (first round)
7. (Spain) Félix Mantilla (first round)
8. (Spain) Alberto Martín (first round)

== Draw ==
Key

- Q = Qualifier
- WC = Wild card
- LL = Lucky loser
- Alt = Alternate
- ITF = ITF entry
- PR = Protected ranking
- SR = Special ranking
- SE = Special exempt
- JE = Junior exempt
- JR = Junior Accelerator Programme entrant
- CO = College Accelerator Programme entrant
- NG = Next Gen Accelerator Program entrant
- w/o = Walkover
- r = Retired
- d = Defaulted

=== Finals ===
Semifinals
(Argentina) David Nalbandian	6	5	6
3	(Spain) Carlos Moyá	4	7	4
(Brazil) Fernando Meligeni	5	1
(Finland) Jarkko Nieminen	7	6

Final
(Argentina) David Nalbandian	6	7^{7}
(Finland) Jarkko Nieminen	4	6^{5}

=== Top half ===
First round
1	(Spain) J C Ferrero	7	6
WC	(France) C Pioline	5	2
(Argentina) D Nalbandian	6	6
(Spain) F Clavet	3	4
(Slovakia) D Hrbatý	6	6
(United Kingdom) M Lee	1	4
(Israel) H Levy	6^{2}	2
5	(Netherlands) S Schalken	7^{7}	6
3	(Spain) C Moyá	7	6
(Argentina) F Squillari	5	4
(Argentina) A Calleri	7	6^{5}	4
(Italy) F Luzzi	5	7^{7}	6
WC	(Portugal) N Matias	2	1
(Spain) A Montañés	6	6
(Belarus) M Mirnyi	6	7^{7}
7	(Spain) F Mantilla	4	6^{4}

Second round
1	(Spain) J C Ferrero	6	4	6^{4}
(Argentina) D Nalbandian	4	6	7^{7}
(Slovakia) D Hrbatý	5	4
5	(Netherlands) S Schalken	7	6
3	(Spain) C Moyá	6	7^{7}
(Italy) F Luzzi	3	6^{3}
(Spain) A Montañés	6	0	1
(Belarus) M Mirnyi	4	6	6

Quarterfinals
(Argentina) D Nalbandian	6	6
5	(Netherlands) S Schalken	4	4
3	(Spain) C Moyá	7^{9}	4	6
(Belarus) M Mirnyi	6^{7}	6	3

Semifinals
(Argentina) D Nalbandian	6	5	6
3	(Spain) C Moyá	4	7	4

=== Bottom half ===
First round
6	(Belgium) X Malisse	1	0
Q	(Costa Rica) J A Marín	6	6
Q	(Brazil) F Costa	3	2
Q	(Czech Republic) R Štěpánek	6	6
(Brazil) F Saretta	6	4	5
(Brazil) F Meligeni	2	6	7
(Argentina) G Coria	7^{7}	7^{8}
WC/4	(Spain) A Costa	6^{5}	6^{6}
8	(Spain) A Martín	3	2
(Spain) G Blanco	6	6
(Italy) A Gaudenzi	6^{7}	1
(Finland) J Nieminen	7^{9}	6
Q	(Spain) F Verdasco	0	3
(Romania) A Voinea	6	6
LL	(Spain) D Ferrer	4	6	2
2	(Russia) M Safin	6	2	6

Second round
Q	(Costa Rica) J A Marín	1	6^{7}
Q	(Czech Republic) R Štěpánek	6	7^{9}
(Brazil) F Meligeni	5	6	4
(Argentina) G Coria	7	3	4^{r}
(Spain) G Blanco	1	2
(Finland) J Nieminen	6	6
(Romania) A Voinea	3	7	2
2	(Russia) M Safin	6	5	6

Quarterfinals
Q	(Czech Republic) R Štěpánek	4	1
(Brazil) F Meligeni	6	6
(Finland) J Nieminen	4	7	6
2	(Russia) M Safin	6	5	3

Semifinals
(Brazil) F Meligeni	5	1
(Finland) J Nieminen	7	6
