= Francisco Cabello =

Francisco Cabello may refer to:

- Francisco Cabello (cyclist) (born 1969), Spanish road bicycle racer
- Francisco Cabello (tennis) (born 1972), Argentine tennis player
