= 1997 Estoril Open =

- Date: 7–14 April
- Edition: 8th
- Category: World Series
- Draw: 32S / 16D
- Prize money: $600,000
- Surface: Clay / outdoor
- Location: Oeiras, Portugal

Champions

Singles
- (Spain) Àlex Corretja

Doubles
- (Brazil) Gustavo Kuerten / (Brazil) Fernando Meligeni
← 1996 ·	Estoril Open	· 1998 →

The 1997 Estoril Open was a tennis tournament played on outdoor clay courts. This event was the 8th edition of the Estoril Open, included in the 1997 ATP Tour World Series. The event took place at the Estoril Court Central, in Oeiras, Portugal, from April 7 through April 14, 1997.

== Finals ==
=== Singles ===
(Spain) Àlex Corretja defeated (Spain) Francisco Clavet, 6–3, 7–5

- It was Corretja's 1st title of the year and 2nd of his career.

=== Doubles ===
(Brazil) Gustavo Kuerten / (Brazil) Fernando Meligeni defeated (Italy) Andrea Gaudenzi / (Italy) Filippo Messori, 6–2, 6–2

- It was Kuerten's and Meligeni's 1st title of the year and 2nd of their careers.
