= 2002 Estoril Open =

- Date: 8–14 April
- Edition: 13th(ATP) / 6th(WTA)
- Surface: Clay / outdoor
- Location: Oeiras, Portugal

Champions

Men's singles
- (Argentina) David Nalbandian

Women's singles
- (Spain) Magüi Serna

Men's doubles
- (Germany) Karsten Braasch / (Russia) Andrei Olhovskiy

Women's doubles
- (Russia) Elena Bovina / (Hungary) Zsófia Gubacsi
← 2001 ·	Estoril Open	· 2003 →

The 2002 Estoril Open was a tennis tournament played on outdoor clay courts at the Estoril Court Central in Oeiras in Portugal that was part of the International Series of the 2002 ATP Tour and of Tier IV of the 2002 WTA Tour. The tournament ran from April 8 through April 14, 2002.

== Finals ==
=== Men's singles ===
(Argentina) David Nalbandian defeated (Finland) Jarkko Nieminen 6–4, 7–6^{(7–5)}

- It was Nalbandian's 1st title of the year and the 1st of his career.

=== Women's singles ===
(Spain) Magüi Serna defeated (Germany) Anca Barna 6–4, 6–2

- It was Serna's only title of the year and the 2nd of her career.

=== Men's doubles ===
(Germany) Karsten Braasch / (Russia) Andrei Olhovskiy defeated (Sweden) Simon Aspelin / (Australia) Andrew Kratzmann 6–3, 6–3

- It was Braasch's 2nd title of the year and the 5th of his career. It was Olhovskiy's 2nd title of the year and the 22nd of his career.

=== Women's doubles ===
(Russia) Elena Bovina / (Hungary) Zsófia Gubacsi defeated (Germany) Barbara Rittner / (Venezuela) María Vento-Kabchi 6–3, 6–1

- It was Bovina's 1st title of the year and the 3rd of her career. It was Gubacsi's only title of the year and the 2nd of her career.
