= 1995 Estoril Open =

- Date: 3–10 April
- Edition: 6th
- Category: World Series
- Draw: 32S / 16D
- Prize money: $550,000
- Surface: Clay / outdoor
- Location: Oeiras, Portugal
- Venue: Estoril Court Central

Champions

Singles
- (Austria) Thomas Muster

Doubles
- (Russia) Yevgeny Kafelnikov / (Russia) Andrei Olhovskiy
- Estoril Open

The 1995 Estoril Open was a men's tennis tournament played on outdoor clay courts. This event was the 6th edition of the Estoril Open, and was included in the World Series of the 1995 ATP Tour. The tournament took place at the Estoril Court Central, in Oeiras, Portugal, from April 3 through April 10, 1995. Third-seeded Thomas Muster won the singles title.

== Finals ==
=== Singles ===
(Austria) Thomas Muster defeated (Spain) Albert Costa, 6–4, 6–2

- It was Muster's 2nd singles title of the year and 25th of his career.

=== Doubles ===
(Russia) Yevgeny Kafelnikov / (Russia) Andrei Olhovskiy defeated (Germany) Marc-Kevin Goellner / (Italy) Diego Nargiso, 5–7, 7–5, 6–2
