= 1998 Estoril Open =

- Date: 6–13 April
- Edition: 9th
- Surface: Clay / outdoor
- Location: Oeiras, Portugal

Champions

Men's singles
- (Spain) Alberto Berasategui

Women's singles
- (Austria) Barbara Schwartz

Men's doubles
- (United States) Donald Johnson / (United States) Francisco Montana

Women's doubles
- (France) Caroline Dhenin / (France) Émilie Loit
← 1997 ·	Estoril Open	· 1999 →

The 1998 Estoril Open was a tennis tournament played on outdoor clay courts. This event was the 9th edition of the Estoril Open, included in the 1998 ATP Tour International Series and in the 1998 ITF Women's Circuit. Both the men's and the women's events took place at the Estoril Court Central, in Oeiras, Portugal, from 6 April until 13 April 1998.

== Finals ==
=== Men's singles ===
(Spain) Alberto Berasategui defeated (Austria) Thomas Muster, 3–6, 6–1, 6–3

=== Women's singles ===
(Austria) Barbara Schwartz defeated (Romania) Raluca Sandu, 6–2, 6–3

=== Men's doubles ===
(United States) Donald Johnson / (United States) Francisco Montana defeated (Mexico) David Roditi / (Netherlands) Fernon Wibier, 6–1, 2–6, 6–1

=== Women's doubles ===
(France) Caroline Dhenin / (France) Émilie Loit defeated (Czech Republic) Radka Bobková / (Germany) Caroline Schneider, 6–2, 6–3
