= 1996 Estoril Open =

- Date: 8–14 April
- Edition: 7th
- Category: World Series
- Draw: 32S / 16D
- Prize money: $600,000
- Surface: Clay / outdoor
- Location: Oeiras, Portugal

Champions

Singles
- (Austria) Thomas Muster

Doubles
- (Spain) Tomás Carbonell / (Spain) Francisco Roig
- Estoril Open

The 1996 Estoril Open was a men's tennis tournament played on outdoor clay courts at the Estoril Court Central in Oeiras in Portugal and was part of the World Series of the 1996 ATP Tour. It was the seventh edition of the tournament and was held from 8 April until 14 April 1996. Thomas Muster won his second consecutive the singles title at the event.

== Finals ==
=== Singles ===
(Austria) Thomas Muster defeated (Italy) Andrea Gaudenzi 7–6^{(7–4)}, 6–4

- It was Muster's 2nd singles title of the year and the 37th of his career.

=== Doubles ===
(Spain) Tomás Carbonell / (Spain) Francisco Roig defeated (Netherlands) Tom Nijssen / (United States) Greg Van Emburgh 6–3, 6–2

- It was Carbonell's 1st title of the year and the 16th of his career. It was Roig's 1st title of the year and the 9th of his career.
