= Angela Cardoso (tennis) =

Portuguese tennis player (born 1980)

- Country (sports): Portugal
- Born: 13 May 1980 (age 45)
- Turned pro: 1996
- Retired: 2003
- Plays: Right-handed (Single-handed backhand)
- Prize money: US$10,140

Singles
- Career record: 14 - 33
- Highest ranking: No. 580 (23 April 2001)

Doubles
- Career record: 16 - 32
- Highest ranking: No. 435 (21 May 2001)

Angela Cardoso (born 13 May 1980) is a former Portuguese professional female tennis player.

She has achieved a career-high singles ranking of no. 580 as of 23 April 2001. Career-high doubles ranking of no. 435 as of 21 May 2001. Cardoso made her WTA main draw debut at the 1999 Estoril Open and 2002 Estoril Open in the doubles event partnering Cristina Correia.

Playing for Portugal at the Fed Cup, Cardoso has a win–loss record of 9–9.

Cardoso retired from professional tennis 2003.

== ITF Career Finals ==
=== Doubles: 2 (0–2) ===
$100,000 tournaments
$75,000 tournaments
$50,000 tournaments
$25,000 tournaments
$10,000 tournaments

Result	Date	Category	Tournament	Surface	Partner	Opponents	Score
Runner-up	28 May 2000	25,000	Guimarães, Portugal	Hard	(Portugal) Carlota Santos	(South Africa) Natalie Grandin (South Africa) Nicole Rencken	6–7^{(7–9)}, 6–2, 2–6
Runner-up	7 May 2001	10,000	Mersin, Turkey	Clay	(Portugal) Ana Catarina Nogueira	(Turkey) Duygu Akşit Oal (Belarus) Elena Yaryshka	1–6, 4–6
