= Federico Mordegan =

Italian tennis player

- Country (sports): Italy
- Born: 1 February 1970 (age 55); Vicenza, Italy
- Height: 1.70 m (5 ft 7 in)
- Plays: Right-handed
- Prize money: $236,608

Singles
- Career record: 2–9
- Career titles: 0; 0 Challenger, 0 Futures
- Highest ranking: No. 243 (12 November 1990)

Grand Slam singles results
- Australian Open: Q2 (1990)

Doubles
- Career record: 41–76
- Career titles: 1; 6 Challenger, 0 Futures
- Highest ranking: No. 70 (16 January 1991)

Grand Slam doubles results
- Australian Open: 1R (1991)
- French Open: 1R (1994)
- Wimbledon: 1R (1991, 1994)
- US Open: 1R (1994)
- Last updated on: 9 June 2022.

Federico Mordegan (born 1 February 1970 in Vicenza, Italy) is a former professional tennis player from Italy.

Mordegan enjoyed most of his tennis success while playing doubles. During his career, he won one doubles title. He achieved a career-high doubles ranking of World No. 70 in 1995.

== ATP career finals ==
=== Doubles: 6 (1 title, 5 runner-ups) ===
Legend Grand Slam tournaments (0–0) ATP World Tour Finals (0–0) ATP World Tour Masters Series(0–0) ATP World Tour Championship Series (0–0) ATP World Tour World Series (1–5)	Titles by surface Hard (0–0) Clay (1–5) Grass (0–0) Carpet (0–0)	Titles by setting Outdoor (1–5) Indoor (0–0)

Result	W–L	Date	Tournament	Tier	Surface	Partner	Opponents	Score
Loss	0–1	Jun 1990	Genova, Italy	World Series	Clay	(Italy) Cristiano Caratti	(Spain) Tomás Carbonell (Germany) Udo Riglewski	6–7, 6–7
Loss	0–2	Aug 1992	San Marino, San Marino	World Series	Clay	(Italy) Cristian Brandi	(Sweden) Nicklas Kulti (Sweden) Mikael Tillström	2–6, 2–6
Loss	0–3	Mar 1994	Casablanca, Morocco	World Series	Clay	(Italy) Cristian Brandi	(South Africa) David Adams (Netherlands) Menno Oosting	3–6, 4–6
Win	1–3	Apr 1994	Estoril, Portugal	World Series	Clay	(Italy) Cristian Brandi	(Netherlands) Richard Krajicek (Netherlands) Menno Oosting	walkover
Loss	1–4	Oct 1994	Athens, Greece	World Series	Clay	(Italy) Cristian Brandi	(Argentina) Luis Lobo (Spain) Javier Sánchez	7–5, 1–6, 4–6
Loss	1–5	Aug 1995	San Marino, San Marino	World Series	Clay	(Argentina) Pablo Albano	(Spain) Jordi Arrese (Australia) Andrew Kratzmann	6–7, 6–3, 2–6

== ATP Challenger and ITF Futures finals ==
=== Singles: 1 (0–1) ===
Legend ATP Challenger (0–1) ITF Futures (0–0)	Finals by surface Hard (0–0) Clay (0–1) Grass (0–0) Carpet (0–0)

Result	W–L	Date	Tournament	Tier	Surface	Opponent	Score
Loss	0–1	Jul 1989	Fürth, Germany	Challenger	Clay	(Soviet Union) Dimitri Poliakov	2–6, 1–6

=== Doubles: 13 (6–7) ===
Legend ATP Challenger (6–7) ITF Futures (0–0)	Finals by surface Hard (0–0) Clay (6–7) Grass (0–0) Carpet (0–0)

Result	W–L	Date	Tournament	Tier	Surface	Partner	Opponents	Score
Win	1–0	Jul 1989	Salerno, Italy	Challenger	Clay	(Italy) Nicola Bruno	(Italy) Ugo Pigato (Italy) Stefano Mezzadri	7–6, 6–2
Loss	1–1	Jul 1989	Fürth, Germany	Challenger	Clay	(Italy) Cristiano Caratti	(Soviet Union) Vladimir Gabrichidze (Soviet Union) Dimitri Poliakov	4–6, 7–6, 4–6
Win	2–1	Sep 1990	Venice, Italy	Challenger	Clay	(Italy) Cristian Brandi	(Sweden) Henrik Holm (Sweden) Nils Holm	6–1, 6–4
Win	3–1	Oct 1991	Reggio Calabria, Italy	Challenger	Clay	(Italy) Cristian Brandi	(Italy) Massimo Boscatto (Italy) Eugenio Rossi	7–5, 6–3
Loss	3–2	May 1992	Ljubljana, Slovenia	Challenger	Clay	(Italy) Cristian Brandi	(Sweden) Magnus Larsson (Sweden) Mikael Tillström	3–6, 2–6
Loss	3–3	Sep 1992	Venice, Italy	Challenger	Clay	(Italy) Cristian Brandi	(Sweden) Johan Donar (Sweden) Ola Jonsson	3–6, 2–6
Win	4–3	Apr 1993	Parioli, Italy	Challenger	Clay	(Italy) Cristian Brandi	(United Kingdom) Sean Cole (Australia) Jon Ireland	6–3, 7–5
Loss	4–4	Aug 1993	Poznań, Poland	Challenger	Clay	(Italy) Cristian Brandi	(Netherlands) Michiel Schapers (Czech Republic) Daniel Vacek	7–6, 4–6, 6–7
Loss	4–5	Sep 1993	Oporto, Portugal	Challenger	Clay	(Italy) Cristian Brandi	(South Africa) Johan de Beer (South Africa) Brent Haygarth	2–6, 6–2, 6–7
Loss	4–6	Jan 1994	Mar del Plata, Argentina	Challenger	Clay	(Italy) Filippo Messori	(Argentina) Lucas Arnold Ker (Argentina) Patricio Arnold	4–6, 5–7
Loss	4–7	Apr 1994	Monte Carlo, Monaco	Challenger	Clay	(Italy) Cristian Brandi	(Sweden) Henrik Holm (Sweden) Magnus Larsson	6–7, 2–6
Win	5–7	Sep 1994	Venice, Italy	Challenger	Clay	(Italy) Cristian Brandi	(Sweden) Tomas Nydahl (Australia) Simon Youl	6–3, 4–6, 6–3
Win	6–7	Jul 1996	Venice, Italy	Challenger	Clay	(Italy) Vincenzo Santopadre	(Italy) Cristian Brandi (Italy) Filippo Messori	6–4, 6–3
