= Anna Földényi =

Hungarian tennis player

- Country (sports): Hungary
- Born: 22 August 1974 (age 51) Düsseldorf, West Germany
- Height: 1.65 m (5 ft 5 in)
- Turned pro: 1988
- Retired: 2007
- Plays: Right-handed (two-handed backhand)
- Prize money: $203,326

Singles
- Career record: 253–160
- Career titles: 13 ITF
- Highest ranking: No. 107 (27 September 1999)

Grand Slam singles results
- Australian Open: 2R (1992)
- French Open: 2R (1993, 2000)
- Wimbledon: 1R (1999)

Doubles
- Career record: 27–36
- Career titles: 3 ITF
- Highest ranking: No. 142 (19 April 1999)

Anna Maria Földényi (born 22 August 1974) is a former professional tennis player from Hungary.

In her career, Földényi won 13 singles and three doubles titles on the ITF Women's Circuit. On 27 September 1999, she reached her best singles ranking of world No. 107. On 19 April 1999, she peaked at No. 142 in the doubles rankings.

Playing for Hungary Fed Cup team, she has a win-loss record of 19–5.

Földényi retired from tour in 2007.

== WTA career finals ==
Legend
Grand Slam
Tier I
Tier II
Tier III
Tier IV and V

=== Doubles: 1 (runner-up) ===
Result	Date	Tournament	Surface	Partner	Opponents	Score
Loss	Apr 1999	Portugal Open	Clay	(Hungary) Rita Kuti-Kis	(Spain) Alicia Ortuño (Spain) Cristina Torrens Valero	6–7^{(4–7)}, 6–3, 3–6

== ITF finals ==
$50,000 tournaments
$25,000 tournaments
$10,000 tournaments

=== Singles: 18 (13–5) ===
Result	No.	Date	Tournament	Surface	Opponent	Score
Win	1.	24 April 1989	Dubrovnik, Yugoslavia	Clay	(Hungary) Réka Szikszay	6–2, 6–7^{(8–10)}, 7–6^{(8–6)}
Loss	2.	21 May 1990	Katowice, Poland	Clay	(Czechoslovakia) Karina Habšudová	3–6, 2–6
Win	3.	6 August 1990	Budapest, Hungary	Clay	(West Germany) Silke Frankl	6–2, 4–6, 6–4
Win	4.	4 May 1992	Porto, Portugal	Clay	(Germany) Maja Živec-Škulj	6–2, 6–3
Loss	5.	6 July 1992	Erlangen, Germany	Clay	(Germany) Karin Kschwendt	4–6, 2–6
Win	6.	20 July 1992	Darmstadt, Germany	Clay	(United States) Nicole Arendt	6–2, 7–6
Loss	7.	31 March 1997	Makarska, Croatia	Clay	(Italy) Giulia Casoni	6–3, 2–6, 4–6
Win	8.	9 June 1997	Velenje, Slovenia	Clay	(Germany) Meike Fröhlich	6–1, 6–1
Win	9.	28 July 1997	Horb, Germany	Clay	(Germany) Julia Abe	6–4, 6–1
Win	10.	14 September 1997	Kyiv, Ukraine	Clay	(Poland) Katarzyna Nowak	6–2, 3–0 ret.
Win	11.	25 May 1998	Salzburg, Austria	Clay	(Hungary) Petra Mandula	1–6, 6–2, 6–2
Win	12.	1 June 1998	Budapest, Hungary	Clay	(Croatia) Silvija Talaja	6–2, 6–4
Win	13.	15 June 1998	Sopot, Poland	Clay	(Russia) Nadia Petrova	3–6, 6–2, 7–6^{(7–5)}
Win	14.	27 July 1999	Horb, Germany	Clay	(Hungary) Zsófia Gubacsi	6–3, 6–0
Win	15.	21 September 1998	Bucharest, Romania	Clay	(Morocco) Bahia Mouhtassine	6–4, 6–4
Loss	16.	11 October 1999	Rhodes, Greece	Clay	(Netherlands) Amanda Hopmans	3–6, 0–6
Loss	17.	23 June 2003	Fontanafredda, Italy	Clay	(Croatia) Darija Jurak	6–7^{(2–7)}, 4–6
Win	18.	19 July 2004	Horb, Germany	Clay	(Czech Republic) Zuzana Zálabská	6–4, 6–7^{(9–11)}, 6–4

=== Doubles: 3 (3–0) ===
Result	No	Date	Tournament	Surface	Partner	Opponents	Score
Win	1.	1 June 1998	Budapest, Hungary	Clay	(Hungary) Rita Kuti-Kis	(Hungary) Petra Gáspár (Hungary) Petra Mandula	6–0, 6–4
Win	2.	15 June 1998	Sopot, Poland	Clay	(Hungary) Rita Kuti-Kis	(Germany) Marketa Kochta (Germany) Syna Schmidle	6–1, 7–6^{(7–4)}
Win	3.	14 September 1998	Bordeaux, France	Clay	(Hungary) Rita Kuti-Kis	(Netherlands) Amanda Hopmans (Germany) Sandra Klösel	6–2, 6–3
