= Bruno Fragoso =

Portuguese tennis player (born 1972)

- Country (sports): Portugal
- Born: 23 November 1972 (age 52); Lisbon, Portugal
- Plays: Right-handed
- Prize money: $18,037

Singles
- Career record: 0–1
- Highest ranking: No. 577 (29 Jan 1996)

Doubles
- Career record: 0–3
- Highest ranking: No. 484 (7 Jul 1997)

Bruno Fragoso (born 23 November 1972) is a Portuguese former professional tennis player.

Born in Lisbon, Fragoso competed on the professional tour in the 1990s.

Fragoso, a two-time national singles champion, made his only ATP Tour singles main draw appearance at the 1997 Estoril Open and had a best ranking of 577 in the world. He featured in two Davis Cup ties for Portugal.

== See also ==
- List of Portugal Davis Cup team representatives
