= Menno Oosting =

Dutch tennis player (1964–1999)

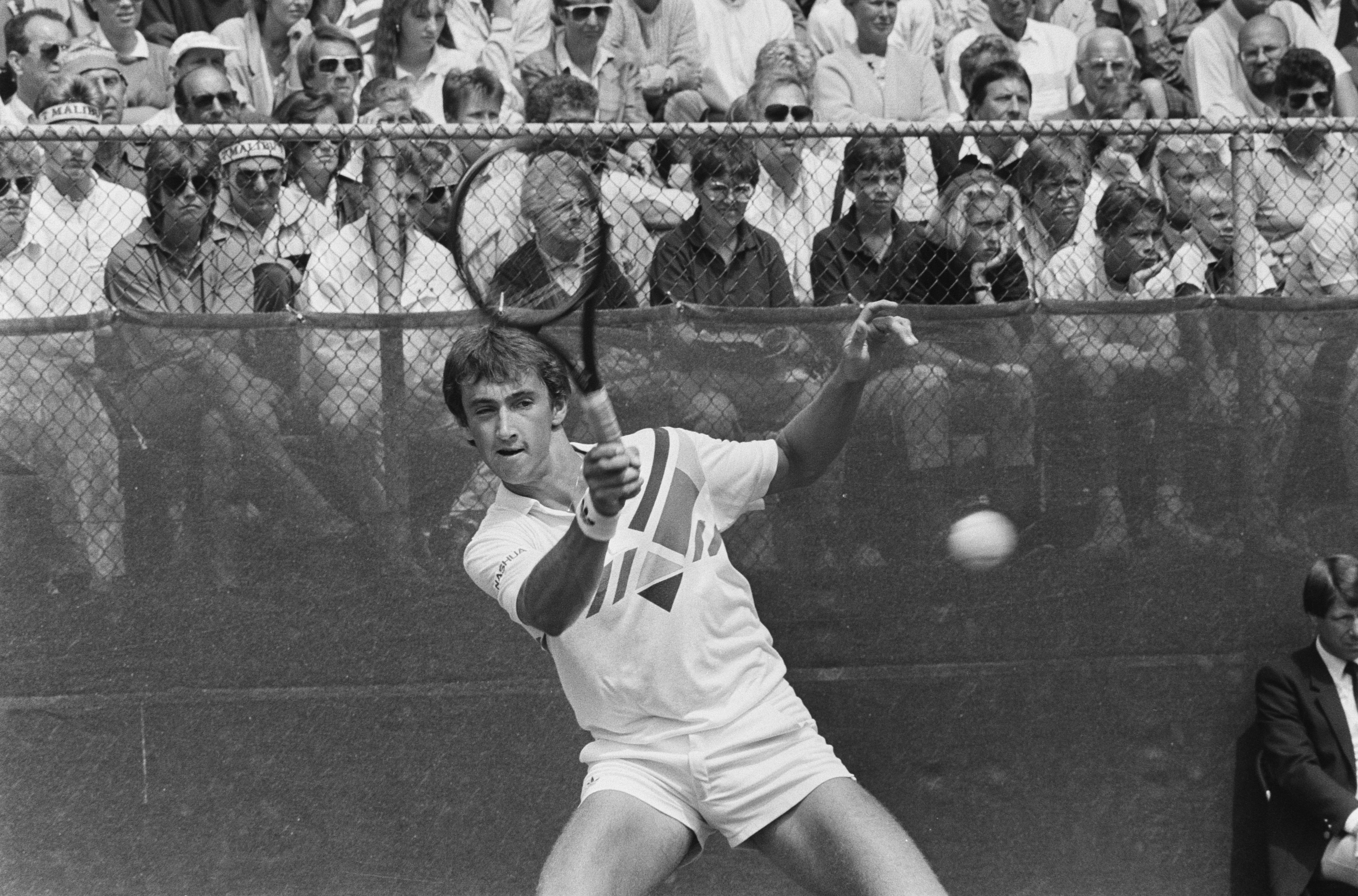
- Country (sports): Netherlands
- Born: 17 May 1964 Son en Breugel, Netherlands
- Died: 22 February 1999 (aged 34) Turnhout, Belgium
- Height: 1.80 m (5 ft 11 in)
- Turned pro: 1983
- Plays: Left-handed
- Prize money: $1,041,725

Singles
- Career record: 26–36
- Career titles: 0
- Highest ranking: No. 72 (4 July 1988)

Grand Slam singles results
- Australian Open: 4R (1988)
- French Open: 1R (1986, 1988)
- Wimbledon: 3R (1988)
- US Open: 2R (1988)

Doubles
- Career record: 239–257
- Career titles: 7
- Highest ranking: No. 20 (13 February 1995)

Grand Slam doubles results
- Australian Open: QF (1991)
- French Open: 3R (1997)
- Wimbledon: 3R (1995)
- US Open: 3R (1996)

Menno Oosting (Dutch pronunciation: [ˈmɛnoː ˈʔoːstɪŋ]; 17 May 1964 – 22 February 1999) was a professional tennis player from the Netherlands, who won seven ATP Tour doubles titles out of 18 finals in his career.

Born in Son en Breugel, North Brabant, Oosting reached a career-high ranking of 72 in the men's singles in 1988, and 20 in doubles in 1995. Oosting won the mixed-doubles title on Roland Garros in 1994, partnering Kristie Boogert. Oosting played in four Davis Cup ties for the Netherlands during the 1980s, posting a 5–3 record in singles and a 2–1 record in doubles. He died of injuries sustained in a car crash in Turnhout, Belgium.

== Career finals ==
=== Doubles: 18 (7 wins, 11 losses) ===
Legend
Grand Slam tournaments (0–0)
Tennis Masters Cup /
ATP World Tour Finals (0–0)
ATP Masters Series /
ATP World Tour Masters 1000 (0–0)
ATP International Series Gold /
ATP World Tour 500 Series (0–1)
ATP International Series /
ATP World Tour 250 Series (7–10)

Result	W/L	Date	Tournament	Surface	Partner	Opponents	Score
Loss	0–1	Sep 1991	Athens, Greece	Clay	(Finland) Olli Rahnasto	(Netherlands) Jacco Eltingh (Netherlands) Mark Koevermans	7–5, 6–7, 5–7
Win	1–1	Apr 1992	Munich, Germany	Clay	(South Africa) David Adams	(Australia) Carl Limberger (Czechoslovakia) Tomáš Anzari	3–6, 7–5, 6–3
Loss	1–2	Mar 1993	Estoril, Portugal	Clay	(Germany) Udo Riglewski	(South Africa) David Adams (Russia) Andrei Olhovskiy	3–6, 5–7
Win	2–2	Sep 1993	Bucharest, Romania	Clay	(Belgium) Libor Pimek	(Romania) George Cosac (Romania) Ciprian Petre Porumb	7–6, 7–6
Win	3–2	Mar 1994	Casablanca, Morocco	Clay	(South Africa) David Adams	(Italy) Cristian Brandi (Italy) Federico Mordegan	6–3, 6–4
Loss	3–3	Mar 1994	Estoril, Portugal	Clay	(Netherlands) Richard Krajicek	(Italy) Cristian Brandi (Italy) Federico Mordegan	w/o
Win	4–3	Apr 1994	Madrid, Spain	Clay	(Sweden) Rikard Bergh	(France) Jean-Philippe Fleurian (Switzerland) Jakob Hlasek	6–3, 6–4
Loss	4–4	Jul 1994	Gstaad, Switzerland	Clay	(Czech Republic) Daniel Vacek	(Spain) Sergio Casal (Spain) Emilio Sánchez	6–7, 4–6
Win	5–4	Oct 1994	Toulouse, France	Hard (i)	(Czech Republic) Daniel Vacek	(United States) Patrick McEnroe (United States) Jared Palmer	7–6, 6–7, 6–3
Win	6–4	Jan 1996	Zagreb, Croatia	Carpet	(Belgium) Libor Pimek	(Czech Republic) Martin Damm (Netherlands) Hendrik Jan Davids	6–3, 7–6
Loss	6–5	Feb 1996	Antwerp, Belgium	Carpet	(Russia) Yevgeny Kafelnikov	(Sweden) Jonas Björkman (Sweden) Nicklas Kulti	4–6, 4–6
Loss	6–6	May 1996	Sankt Pölten, Austria	Clay	(South Africa) David Adams	(Czech Republic) Ctislav Doseděl (Czech Republic) Pavel Vízner	7–6, 4–6, 3–6
Loss	6–7	Jul 1996	Kitzbühel, Austria	Clay	(South Africa) David Adams	(Belgium) Libor Pimek (South Africa) Byron Talbot	6–7, 3–6
Loss	6–8	Sep 1996	Bucharest, Romania	Clay	(South Africa) David Adams	(Sweden) David Ekerot (United States) Jeff Tarango	6–7, 6–7
Loss	6–9	Sep 1996	Basel, Switzerland	Hard (i)	(South Africa) David Adams	(Russia) Yevgeny Kafelnikov (Czech Republic) Daniel Vacek	3–6, 4–6
Loss	6–10	Oct 1996	Vienna, Austria	Carpet	(Czech Republic) Pavel Vízner	(Russia) Yevgeny Kafelnikov (Czech Republic) Daniel Vacek	6–7, 4–6
Win	7–10	Mar 1998	Copenhagen, Denmark	Carpet	(Netherlands) Tom Kempers	(Netherlands) Jan Siemerink (New Zealand) Brett Steven	6–4, 7–6
Loss	7–11	Feb 1999	St. Petersburg, Russia	Carpet	(Romania) Andrei Pavel	(United States) Jeff Tarango (Czech Republic) Daniel Vacek	6–3, 3–6, 5–7
