= Emanuel Couto =

Portuguese tennis player (born 1973)

- Country (sports): Portugal
- Born: 6 August 1973 (age 52) Guarda, Portugal
- Height: 1.83 m (6 ft 0 in)
- Turned pro: 1990
- Retired: 2003
- Plays: Right-handed
- Prize money: US$ 269,001

Singles
- Career record: 15–21 (42%)
- Career titles: 0
- Highest ranking: No. 174 (22 February 1996)

Doubles
- Career record: 32–33 (49%)
- Career titles: 1
- Highest ranking: No. 91 (6 September 1997)

Grand Slam doubles results
- French Open: 2R (1997)
- Wimbledon: 2R (1997)
- US Open: 1R (1995)

Other doubles tournaments
- Olympic Games: 1R (1992, 1996)

Emanuel Couto (born 6 August 1973) is a Portuguese former professional tennis player. He achieved a career-high doubles ranking of World No. 91 in 1997.

The highest moment of his career was his only ATP level victory in his home country at the Oporto Open in 1996 with fellow Portuguese player and regular doubles partner Bernardo Mota.

Couto participated in 20 Davis Cup ties for Portugal from 1994 to 2003, posting a 13–5 record in doubles and an 11–10 record in singles.

Couto also represented Portugal at the Barcelona 1992 and Atlanta 1996 Olympics in the men's doubles category.

== Career finals ==
=== Doubles: 2 (1 title, 1 runner-up) ===
Legend Grand Slam Tournaments (0/0) ATP Tour World Championships (0/0) ATP Masters Series (0/0) ATP International Series Gold (0/0) ATP International Series (1/1)	Titles by surface Hard (0/0) Clay (1/1) Grass (0/0) Carpet (0/0)

Result	No.	Date	Tournament	Surface	Partner	Opponents	Score
Loss	1.	Mar 1995	Casablanca, Morocco	Clay	(Portugal) João Cunha e Silva	(Spain) Tomás Carbonell (Spain) Francisco Roig	6–4, 6–1
Win	1.	Jun 1996	Oporto, Portugal	Clay	(Portugal) Bernardo Mota	(Australia) Joshua Eagle (Australia) Andrew Florent	4–6, 6–4, 6–4

== Awards ==
- 2013 – ITF Commitment Award
