= João Cunha e Silva =

Portuguese tennis player (born 1967)

- Country (sports): Portugal
- Residence: Lisbon, Portugal
- Born: 27 November 1967 (age 58) Lisbon, Portugal
- Height: 1.72 m (5 ft 7 1/2 in)
- Turned pro: 1987
- Retired: 2000
- Plays: Right-handed
- Prize money: US$ 735,607

Singles
- Career record: 37–85 (30%)
- Career titles: 0
- Highest ranking: No. 108 (15 April 1991)

Grand Slam singles results
- Australian Open: 1R (1989, 1991, 1993)
- French Open: 1R (1991)
- Wimbledon: 2R (1993)
- US Open: 2R (1993)

Doubles
- Career record: 45–81 (36%)
- Career titles: 2
- Highest ranking: No. 72 (13 March 1989)

Grand Slam doubles results
- Australian Open: 1R (1989, 1991, 1993, 1998)
- French Open: 1R (1989, 1995)
- Wimbledon: 1R (1997)
- US Open: 1R (1993)

Mixed doubles
- Career record: 0–1
- Career titles: 0

Grand Slam mixed doubles results
- Australian Open: 1R (1989)

João Cunha e Silva (also known as João Cunha-Silva; born 27 November 1967) is a Portuguese former professional tennis player. He won two doubles titles during his career on the ATP Tour. He reached his career-high doubles ranking of world No. 72 in March 1989.

Cunha e Silva holds several records for the Portugal Davis Cup team, including most singles wins, most total wins, most ties played, and most years played.

He is currently coaching Tour player Frederico Gil at the CETO - Clube Escola de Ténis de Oeiras (Oeiras Tennis School Club) as well as João Domingues.

Portuguese tennis player Felipe Cunha e Silva is his son.

== Career finals ==
=== Doubles: 4 (2–2) ===
| Legend Grand Slam Tournaments (0/0) ATP Tour World Championships (0/0) ATP Masters Series (0/0) ATP International Series Gold (0/0) ATP International Series (2/2) | Titles by surface Hard (1/1) Clay (1/1) Grass (0/0) Carpet (0/0) |

| Result | W/L | Date | Tournament | Surface | Partner | Opponents | Score |
|---|---|---|---|---|---|---|---|
| Loss | 0–1 | Mar 1989 | Nancy, France | Hard (i) | (Belgium) Eduardo Masso | (Germany) Udo Riglewski (Sweden) Tobias Svantesson | 6–4, 6–7, 7–6 |
| Win | 1–1 | Oct 1992 | Tel Aviv, Israel | Hard | (United States) Mike Bauer | (Netherlands) Mark Koevermans (Sweden) Tobias Svantesson | 6–3, 6–4 |
| Loss | 1–2 | Mar 1995 | Casablanca, Morocco | Clay | (Portugal) Emanuel Couto | (Spain) Tomás Carbonell (Spain) Francisco Roig | 6–4, 6–1 |
| Win | 2–2 | Mar 1997 | Casablanca, Morocco | Clay | (Portugal) Nuno Marques | (Morocco) Karim Alami (Morocco) Hicham Arazi | 7–6, 6–2 |

== Awards ==
- 2013 – ITF Commitment Award
