= Bernardo Mota =

Portuguese tennis player (born 1971)

- Country (sports): Portugal
- Residence: Lisbon, Portugal
- Born: 14 July 1971 (age 54) Lisbon, Portugal
- Height: 1.78 m (5 ft 10 in)
- Turned pro: 1991
- Retired: 2005
- Plays: Right-handed
- Prize money: US$ 253,056

Singles
- Career record: 12–24 (33%)
- Career titles: 0
- Highest ranking: No. 194 (31 March 1997)

Other tournaments
- Olympic Games: 1R (1992)

Doubles
- Career record: 23–24 (49%)
- Career titles: 1
- Highest ranking: No. 96 (21 April 1997)

Grand Slam doubles results
- French Open: 2R (1997)
- Wimbledon: 2R (1997)

Other doubles tournaments
- Olympic Games: 1R (1992, 1996, 2000)
- Last updated on: 6 July 2009.

Bernardo Gonçalves Pereira Mota (born 14 July 1971 in Lisbon) is a former tennis player from Portugal, who turned professional in 1991. He represented his native country at the 1992 Summer Olympics in Barcelona, where he was defeated in the first round by Croatia's Goran Ivanišević. The right-hander reached his highest singles ATP-ranking on 31 March 1997, when he became number 194 of the world.

He was most successful in the doubles category, achieving a career-high doubles ranking of World No. 96 in 1997. The highest moment of his career was his only ATP level victory in his home country at the Oporto Open in 1996 with fellow Portuguese player and regular doubles partner Emanuel Couto.

After retiring from the circuit, Mota coached top Portuguese players including Rui Machado, Pedro Sousa and Frederico Gil.

== Career finals ==
=== Doubles (1 title) ===
Legend Grand Slam Tournaments (0/0) ATP Tour World Championships (0/0) ATP Masters Series (0/0) ATP International Series Gold (0/0) ATP International Series (1/0)	Titles by surface Hard (0/0) Clay (1/0) Grass (0/0) Carpet (0/0)

Result	No.	Date	Tournament	Surface	Partner	Opponents	Score
Win	1.	Jun 1996	Oporto, Portugal	Clay	(Portugal) Emanuel Couto	(Australia) Joshua Eagle (Australia) Andrew Florent	4–6, 6–4, 6–4
