= Portugal Open =

Coordinates: 38°42′29″N 9°15′9″W

Defunct tennis tournament
- Founded: 1990
- Abolished: 2014
- Location: Oeiras; Portugal
- Venue: Estádio Nacional do Jamor
- Surface: Clay / Outdoors
- Website: Official Website
ATP Tour
- Category: ATP World Series (1990–1997); ATP International Series (1998–2008); ATP World Tour 250 series (2009–2014)
- Draw: 28S / 16Q / 16D
WTA Tour
- Category: WTA Tier IV (1999–2008); International (2009–2014)
- Draw: 32M / 32Q / 16D

The Portugal Open (formerly named Estoril Open) was an ATP and WTA clay court tennis tournament in Portugal. The event took place at the sports complex of Jamor in Oeiras, of which Estoril Court Central is the most prominent show court. In 2015, the tournament was canceled due to lack of sponsorship. A new tournament, Millennium Estoril Open, was created in its place, moving from Oeiras to Cascais. The 2014 Portugal Open was the last edition.

== History ==
The men's tournament was created in 1990 and has been won by several top-10 players, including former world No. 1 players Thomas Muster (1995 and 1996), Carlos Moyà (2000), Juan Carlos Ferrero (2001), Novak Djokovic (2007), and Roger Federer (2008). Also, Marat Safin lost the 2004 final and Yevgeny Kafelnikov and Gustavo Kuerten won the doubles tournament in 1995 and 1997, respectively. The men's half was part of ATP World Tour 250 series tournaments.

The women's tournament started in 1989 as the Estoril Ladies Open and was in its first two years, a separate event. After being discontinued in 1990, the event returned as a part of the Estoril Open in 1998, starting as an ITF tournament. In the following year it became a WTA tournament again. The women's tournament is currently an International Series tournament. No former world No. 1 has ever won the women's tournament but Victoria Azarenka was runner-up in 2007.

Statistically, the men's tournament highlights the dominance of Argentine and Spanish male players on red clay. Between 1990 and 2001, at least one Spaniard appeared in the final ten times, with a player from Spain claiming the title in nine of those twelve years. The Spanish dominance waned in recent years. Since 2001, there have only been three Spaniards in four finals with two victories. Between 2002 and 2006, an Argentine made the final at Estoril, winning four of these five titles. The Argentine streak returned in 2011 with the first of three more victories in four years.

The roll of champions on the women's side is more diverse. Twelve of the seventeen different champions have represented a nation that had not previously won it. Despite this, Spain is still, although slightly, the most dominant nation. The women's tournament is a popular spot for players to win their first title; since it became a WTA event again in 1999, six players have used it to win their maiden title. In 2006, it showcased the first all-Chinese final in tour history, between Zheng Jie and Li Na.

Only one Portuguese player has reached the final in either the men's or the women's event: Frederico Gil, the losing men's finalist in 2010.

In 2013, the organization of the tournament changed its name to "Portugal Open" in order to present the tournament as a Portuguese well-organized event.

== Past finals ==
Legend:	ITF event

Men's singles

Year	Champion	Runner-up	Score
1990	(Spain) Emilio Sánchez	(Argentina) Franco Davín	6–3, 6–1
1991	(Spain) Sergi Bruguera	(Czech Republic) Karel Nováček	7–6^{(9–7)}, 6–1
1992	(Spain) Carlos Costa	(Spain) Sergi Bruguera	4–6, 6–2, 6–2
1993	(Ukraine) Andriy Medvedev	(Czech Republic) Karel Nováček	6–4, 6–2
1994	(Spain) Carlos Costa (2)	(Ukraine) Andriy Medvedev	4–6, 7–5, 6–4
1995	(Austria) Thomas Muster	(Spain) Albert Costa	6–4, 6–2
1996	(Austria) Thomas Muster (2)	(Italy) Andrea Gaudenzi	7–6^{(7–4)}, 6–4
1997	(Spain) Àlex Corretja	(Spain) Francisco Clavet	6–3, 7–5
1998	(Spain) Alberto Berasategui	(Austria) Thomas Muster	3–6, 6–1, 6–3
1999	(Spain) Albert Costa	(United States) Todd Martin	7–6^{(7–4)}, 2–6, 6–3
2000	(Spain) Carlos Moyà	(Spain) Francisco Clavet	6–3, 6–2
2001	(Spain) Juan Carlos Ferrero	(Spain) Félix Mantilla	7–6^{(7–3)}, 4–6, 6–3
2002	(Argentina) David Nalbandian	(Finland) Jarkko Nieminen	6–4, 7–6^{(7–5)}
2003	(Russia) Nikolay Davydenko	(Argentina) Agustín Calleri	6–4, 6–3
2004	(Argentina) Juan Ignacio Chela	(Russia) Marat Safin	6–7^{(2–7)}, 6–3, 6–3
2005	(Argentina) Gastón Gaudio	(Spain) Tommy Robredo	6–1, 2–6, 6–1
2006	(Argentina) David Nalbandian (2)	(Russia) Nikolay Davydenko	6–3, 6–4
2007	(Serbia) Novak Djokovic	(France) Richard Gasquet	7–6^{(9–7)}, 0–6, 6–1
2008	(Switzerland) Roger Federer	(Russia) Nikolay Davydenko	7–6^{(7–5)}, 1–2 retired
2009	(Spain) Albert Montañés	(United States) James Blake	5–7, 7–6^{(8–6)}, 6–0
2010	(Spain) Albert Montañés (2)	(Portugal) Frederico Gil	6–2, 6–7^{(4–7)}, 7–5
2011	(Argentina) Juan Martín del Potro	(Spain) Fernando Verdasco	6–2, 6–2
2012	(Argentina) Juan Martín del Potro (2)	(France) Richard Gasquet	6–4, 6–2
2013	(Switzerland) Stan Wawrinka	(Spain) David Ferrer	6–1, 6–4
2014	(Argentina) Carlos Berlocq	(Czech Republic) Tomáš Berdych	0–6, 7–5, 6–1

Women's singles

Year	Champion	Runner-up	Score
1990	(Italy) Federica Bonsignori	(Italy) Laura Garrone	2–6, 6–3, 6–3
1991–1997: no tournament held
1999	(Slovenia) Katarina Srebotnik	(Hungary) Rita Kuti-Kis	6–3, 6–1
1998	(Austria) Barbara Schwartz	(Romania) Raluca Sandu	6–2, 6–3
2000	(Germany) Anke Huber	(France) Nathalie Dechy	6–2, 1–6, 7–5
2001	(Spain) Ángeles Montolio	(Russia) Elena Bovina	3–6, 6–3, 6–2
2002	(Spain) Magüi Serna	(Germany) Anca Barna	6–4, 6–2
2003	(Spain) Magüi Serna (2)	(Germany) Julia Schruff	6–4, 6–1
2004	(France) Émilie Loit	(Czech Republic) Iveta Benešová	7–5, 7–6^{(7–1)}
2005	(Czech Republic) Lucie Šafářová	(China) Li Na	6–7^{(4–7)}, 6–4, 6–3
2006	(China) Zheng Jie	(China) Li Na	6–7^{(5–7)}, 7–5, retired
2007	(Germany) Gréta Arn	(Belarus) Victoria Azarenka	2–6, 6–1, 7–6^{(7–3)}
2008	(Russia) Maria Kirilenko	(Czech Republic) Iveta Benešová	6–4, 6–2
2009	(Belgium) Yanina Wickmayer	(Russia) Ekaterina Makarova	7–5, 6–2
2010	(Latvia) Anastasija Sevastova	(Spain) Arantxa Parra Santonja	6–2, 7–5
2011	(Spain) Anabel Medina Garrigues	(Germany) Kristina Barrois	6–1, 6–2
2012	(Estonia) Kaia Kanepi	(Spain) Carla Suárez Navarro	3–6, 7–6^{(8–6)}, 6–4
2013	(Russia) Anastasia Pavlyuchenkova	(Spain) Carla Suárez Navarro	7–5, 6–2
2014	(Spain) Carla Suárez Navarro	(Russia) Svetlana Kuznetsova	6–4, 3–6, 6–4

Men's doubles

Year	Champions	Runners-up	Score
1990	(Spain) Sergio Casal (Spain) Emilio Sánchez	(Italy) Omar Camporese (Italy) Paolo Canè	7–5, 4–6, 7–5
1991	(Netherlands) Paul Haarhuis (Netherlands) Mark Koevermans	(Netherlands) Tom Nijssen (Czech Republic) Cyril Suk	6–3, 6–3
1992	(Netherlands) Hendrik Jan Davids (Belgium) Libor Pimek	(United States) Luke Jensen (Australia) Laurie Warder	3–6, 6–3, 7–5
1993	(South Africa) David Adams (Russia) Andrei Olhovskiy	(Netherlands) Menno Oosting (Germany) Udo Riglewski	6–3, 7–5
1994	(Italy) Cristian Brandi (Italy) Federico Mordegan	(Netherlands) Richard Krajicek (Netherlands) Menno Oosting	walkover
1995	(Russia) Yevgeny Kafelnikov (Russia) Andrei Olhovskiy (2)	(Germany) Marc-Kevin Goellner (Italy) Diego Nargiso	5–7, 7–5, 6–2
1996	(Spain) Tomás Carbonell (Spain) Francisco Roig	(Netherlands) Tom Nijssen (United States) Greg Van Emburgh	6–3, 6–2
1997	(Brazil) Gustavo Kuerten (Brazil) Fernando Meligeni	(Italy) Andrea Gaudenzi (Italy) Filippo Messori	6–2, 6–2
1998	(United States) Donald Johnson (United States) Francisco Montana	(Mexico) David Roditi (Netherlands) Fernon Wibier	6–1, 2–6, 6–1
1999	(Spain) Tomás Carbonell (2) (United States) Donald Johnson (2)	(Czech Republic) Jiří Novák (Czech Republic) David Rikl	6–3, 2–6, 6–1
2000	(United States) Donald Johnson (3) (South Africa) Piet Norval	(South Africa) David Adams (Australia) Joshua Eagle	6–4, 7–5
2001	(Czech Republic) Radek Štěpánek (Czech Republic) Michal Tabara	(United States) Donald Johnson (Serbia) Nenad Zimonjić	6–4, 6–1
2002	(Germany) Karsten Braasch (Russia) Andrei Olhovskiy (3)	(Sweden) Simon Aspelin (Australia) Andrew Kratzmann	6–3, 6–3
2003	(India) Mahesh Bhupathi (Belarus) Max Mirnyi	(Argentina) Lucas Arnold Ker (Argentina) Mariano Hood	6–1, 6–2
2004	(Argentina) Juan Ignacio Chela (Argentina) Gastón Gaudio	(Czech Republic) František Čermák (Czech Republic) Leoš Friedl	6–2, 6–1
2005	(Czech Republic) František Čermák (Czech Republic) Leoš Friedl	(Argentina) Juan Ignacio Chela (Spain) Tommy Robredo	6–3, 6–4
2006	(Czech Republic) Lukáš Dlouhý (Czech Republic) Pavel Vízner	(Argentina) Lucas Arnold Ker (Czech Republic) Leoš Friedl	6–3, 6–1
2007	(Brazil) Marcelo Melo (Brazil) André Sá	(Argentina) Martín García (Argentina) Sebastián Prieto	3–6, 6–2, [10–6]
2008	(South Africa) Jeff Coetzee (South Africa) Wesley Moodie	(United Kingdom) Jamie Murray (Zimbabwe) Kevin Ullyett	6–2, 4–6, [10–8]
2009	(United States) Eric Butorac (United States) Scott Lipsky	(Czech Republic) Martin Damm (Sweden) Robert Lindstedt	6–3, 6–2
2010	(Spain) Marc López (Spain) David Marrero	(Uruguay) Pablo Cuevas (Spain) Marcel Granollers	6–7^{(1–7)}, 6–4, [10–4]
2011	(United States) Eric Butorac (2) (Curaçao) Jean-Julien Rojer	(Spain) Marc López (Spain) David Marrero	6–3, 6–4
2012	(Pakistan) Aisam-ul-Haq Qureshi (Netherlands) Jean-Julien Rojer (2)	(Austria) Julian Knowle (Spain) David Marrero	7–5, 7–5
2013	(Mexico) Santiago González (United States) Scott Lipsky (2)	(Pakistan) Aisam-ul-Haq Qureshi (Netherlands) Jean-Julien Rojer	6–3, 4–6, [10–7]
2014	(Mexico) Santiago González (2) (United States) Scott Lipsky (3)	(Uruguay) Pablo Cuevas (Spain) David Marrero	6–3, 3–6, [10–8]

Women's doubles

Year	Champions	Runners-up	Score
1990	(Argentina) Patricia Tarabini (Italy) Sandra Cecchini	(Netherlands) Carin Bakkum (Netherlands) Nicole Muns-Jagerman	1–6, 6–2, 6–3
1991–1997: no tournament held
1999	(Spain) Alicia Ortuño (Spain) Cristina Torrens Valero	(Hungary) Rita Kuti-Kis (Hungary) Anna Földényi	7–6^{(7–4)}, 3–6, 6–3
1998	(France) Caroline Dhenin (France) Émilie Loit	(Czech Republic) Radka Bobková (Germany) Caroline Schneider	6–2, 6–3
2000	(Slovenia) Tina Križan (Slovenia) Katarina Srebotnik	(Netherlands) Amanda Hopmans (Spain) Cristina Torrens Valero	6–0, 7–6^{(11–9)}
2001	(Czech Republic) Květa Hrdličková (Germany) Barbara Rittner	(Slovenia) Tina Križan (Slovenia) Katarina Srebotnik	3–6, 7–5, 6–1
2002	(Russia) Elena Bovina (Hungary) Zsófia Gubacsi	(Germany) Barbara Rittner (Venezuela) María Vento-Kabchi	6–3, 6–1
2003	(Hungary) Petra Mandula (Australia) Patricia Wartusch	(Estonia) Maret Ani (Switzerland) Emmanuelle Gagliardi	6–7^{(3–7)}, 7–6^{(7–3)}, 6–2
2004	(Switzerland) Emmanuelle Gagliardi (Slovakia) Janette Husárová	(Czech Republic) Olga Blahotová (Czech Republic) Gabriela Navrátilová	6–3, 6–2
2005	(China) Li Ting (China) Sun Tiantian	(Netherlands) Michaëlla Krajicek (Slovakia) Henrieta Nagyová	6–3, 6–1
2006	(China) Li Ting (2) (China) Sun Tiantian (2)	(Argentina) Gisela Dulko (Spain) María Sánchez Lorenzo	6–2, 6–2
2007	(Romania) Andreea Ehritt-Vanc (Russia) Anastasia Rodionova	(Spain) Lourdes Domínguez Lino (Spain) Arantxa Parra Santonja	6–3, 6–2
2008	(Russia) Maria Kirilenko (Italy) Flavia Pennetta	(Bosnia and Herzegovina) Mervana Jugić-Salkić (Turkey) İpek Şenoğlu	6–4, 6–4
2009	(United States) Raquel Kops-Jones (United States) Abigail Spears	(Canada) Sharon Fichman (Hungary) Katalin Marosi	2–6, 6–3, [10–5]
2010	(Romania) Sorana Cîrstea (Spain) Anabel Medina Garrigues	(Russia) Vitalia Diatchenko (France) Aurélie Védy	6–1, 7–5
2011	(Russia) Alisa Kleybanova (Kazakhstan) Galina Voskoboeva	(Greece) Eleni Daniilidou (Netherlands) Michaëlla Krajicek	6–4, 6–2
2012	(Chinese Taipei) Chuang Chia-jung (China) Zhang Shuai	(Kazakhstan) Yaroslava Shvedova (Kazakhstan) Galina Voskoboeva	4–6, 6–1, [11–9]
2013	(Chinese Taipei) Chan Hao-ching (France) Kristina Mladenovic	(Croatia) Darija Jurak (Hungary) Katalin Marosi	7–6^{(7–3)}, 6–2
2014	(Zimbabwe) Cara Black (India) Sania Mirza	(Czech Republic) Eva Hrdinová (Russia) Valeria Solovyeva	6–4, 6–3

== See also ==
- Estoril Open – 2015 to present
- Portuguese International Championships – 1901 to 1973
