= 2001 Estoril Open – Men's doubles =

Men's doubles
- 2001 Estoril Open

Final
- Champions: (Czech Republic) Radek Štěpánek; (Czech Republic) Michal Tabara
- Runners-up: (United States) Donald Johnson; (Federal Republic of Yugoslavia) Nenad Zimonjić
- Score: 6–4, 6–1

Events
Singles	men	women
Doubles	men	women
← 2000 ·	Estoril Open	· 2002 →

Donald Johnson and Piet Norval were the defending champions but only Johnson competed that year with Nenad Zimonjić.

Johnson and Zimonjić lost in the final 6–4, 6–1 against Radek Štěpánek and Michal Tabara.

== Seeds ==
1. (United States) Donald Johnson / (Federal Republic of Yugoslavia) Nenad Zimonjić (final)
2. (Slovakia) Dominik Hrbatý / (Czech Republic) David Rikl (semifinals)
3. (Australia) Joshua Eagle / (Australia) Andrew Florent (semifinals)
4. (Argentina) Lucas Arnold / (Spain) Tomás Carbonell (first round)

== Draw ==
=== Key ===
- Q = Qualifier
- WC = Wild card
- LL = Lucky loser
- Alt = Alternate
- ITF = ITF entry
- PR = Protected ranking
- SR = Special ranking
- SE = Special exempt
- JE = Junior exempt
- JR = Junior Accelerator Programme entrant
- CO = College Accelerator Programme entrant
- NG = Next Gen Accelerator Program entrant
- w/o = Walkover
- r = Retired
- d = Defaulted

First round

Quarterfinals

Semifinals

Final

1
- (United States) D Johnson
- (Federal Republic of Yugoslavia) N Zimonjić
7^{8}
6

- (Spain) J Balcells
- (Israel) E Ran
6^{6}
4

1
- (United States) D Johnson
- (Federal Republic of Yugoslavia) N Zimonjić
6
6

WC
- (Portugal) E Couto
- (Portugal) A van Grichen
2
0

- (Czech Republic) C Suk
- (Belgium) T Vanhoudt
3
0

- (Czech Republic) C Suk
- (Belgium) T Vanhoudt
6
6

1
- (United States) D Johnson
- (Federal Republic of Yugoslavia) N Zimonjić
6
3
6

3
- (Australia) J Eagle
- (Australia) A Florent
6
7^{7}

3
- (Australia) J Eagle
- (Australia) A Florent
3
6
3

- (Spain) Á López Morón
- (Spain) A Portas
3
6^{4}

3
- (Australia) J Eagle
- (Australia) A Florent
1
6
6

- (Czech Republic) P Pála
- (Czech Republic) P Vízner
7
6

- (Czech Republic) P Pála
- (Czech Republic) P Vízner
6
3
4

WC
- (Portugal) P Leão
- (Portugal) A Lopes
5
3

1
- (United States) D Johnson
- (Federal Republic of Yugoslavia) N Zimonjić
4
1

- (North Macedonia) A Kitinov
- (Russia) A Olhovskiy
4
2

Q
- (Czech Republic) R Štěpánek
- (Czech Republic) M Tabara
6
6

- (South Africa) N Godwin
- (South Africa) R Koenig
6
6

- (South Africa) N Godwin
- (South Africa) R Koenig
3
3

Q
- (Czech Republic) R Štěpánek
- (Czech Republic) M Tabara
6
7^{7}

Q
- (Czech Republic) R Štěpánek
- (Czech Republic) M Tabara
6
6

4
- (Argentina) L Arnold
- (Spain) T Carbonell
2
6^{4}

Q
- (Czech Republic) R Štěpánek
- (Czech Republic) M Tabara
6
6

- (Czech Republic) T Cibulec
- (Czech Republic) L Friedl
7^{7}
6

2
- (Slovakia) D Hrbatý
- (Czech Republic) D Rikl
2
0

- (South Africa) M Barnard
- (Australia) A Kratzmann
6^{3}
3

- (Czech Republic) T Cibulec
- (Czech Republic) L Friedl
6
2
4

WC
- (Portugal) H Lopes
- (Portugal) P Pereira
4
2

2
- (Slovakia) D Hrbatý
- (Czech Republic) D Rikl
4
6
6

2
- (Slovakia) D Hrbatý
- (Czech Republic) D Rikl
6
6
