= 2001 Estoril Open =

- Date: 9–15 April
- Edition: 12th(ATP) / 5th(WTA)
- Surface: Clay / outdoor
- Location: Oeiras, Portugal

Champions

Men's singles
- (Spain) Juan Carlos Ferrero

Women's singles
- (Spain) Ángeles Montolio

Men's doubles
- (Czech Republic) Radek Štěpánek / (Czech Republic) Michal Tabara

Women's doubles
- (Czech Republic) Květa Hrdličková / (Germany) Barbara Rittner
← 2000 ·	Estoril Open	· 2002 →

The 2001 Estoril Open was a tennis tournament played on outdoor clay courts at the Estoril Court Central in Oeiras in Portugal and was part of the International Series of the 2001 ATP Tour and of Tier IV of the 2001 WTA Tour. The tournament ran from 9 April until 15 April 2001. Juan Carlos Ferrero and Ángeles Montolio won the singles titles.

== Finals ==
=== Men's singles ===
(Spain) Juan Carlos Ferrero defeated (Spain) Félix Mantilla 7–6^{(7–3)}, 4–6, 6–3

- It was Ferrero's 2nd title of the year and the 3rd of his career.

=== Women's singles ===
(Spain) Ángeles Montolio defeated (Russia) Elena Bovina 3–6, 6–3, 6–2

- It was Montolio's 1st title of the year and the 1st of her career.

=== Men's doubles ===
(Czech Republic) Radek Štěpánek / (Czech Republic) Michal Tabara defeated (United States) Donald Johnson / (Federal Republic of Yugoslavia) Nenad Zimonjić 6–4, 6–1

- It was Štěpánek's 1st title of the year and the 2nd of his career. It was Tabara's 2nd title of the year and the 2nd of his career.

=== Women's doubles ===
(Czech Republic) Květa Hrdličková / (Germany) Barbara Rittner defeated (Slovenia) Tina Križan / (Slovenia) Katarina Srebotnik 3–6, 7–5, 6–1

- It was Hrdličková's only title of the year and the 3rd of her career. It was Rittner's 1st title of the year and the 3rd of her career.
