= 2000 Estoril Open – Women's singles =

Women's singles
- 2000 Estoril Open

Final
- Champion: (Germany) Anke Huber
- Runner-up: (France) Nathalie Dechy
- Score: 6–2, 1–6, 7–5

Details
- Draw: 32
- Seeds: 8

Events
Singles	men	women
Doubles	men	women
← 1999 ·	Portugal Open	· 2001 →

Katarina Srebotnik was the defending champion, but lost in first round to Seda Noorlander.

Anke Huber won the title by defeating Nathalie Dechy 6–2, 1–6, 7–5 in the final.

== Seeds ==
1. (Germany) Anke Huber (champion)
2. (France) Nathalie Dechy (final)
3. (France) Anne-Gaëlle Sidot (second round)
4. (France) Sarah Pitkowski (first round)
5. (Italy) Silvia Farina (semifinals)
6. (Spain) Cristina Torrens Valero (quarterfinals)
7. (Hungary) Rita Kuti-Kis (quarterfinals)
8. (Spain) Ángeles Montolio (quarterfinals)

== Draw ==
Key

- Q = Qualifier
- WC = Wild card
- LL = Lucky loser
- Alt = Alternate
- ITF = ITF entry
- PR = Protected ranking
- SR = Special ranking
- SE = Special exempt
- JE = Junior exempt
- JR = Junior Accelerator Programme entrant
- CO = College Accelerator Programme entrant
- NG = Next Gen Accelerator Program entrant
- w/o = Walkover
- r = Retired
- d = Defaulted

=== Finals ===
Semifinals
1	(Germany) Anke Huber	6	6
(Italy) Tathiana Garbin	3	2
5	(Italy) Silvia Farina	2	4
2	(France) Nathalie Dechy	6	6

Final
1	(Germany) Anke Huber	6	1	7
2	(France) Nathalie Dechy	2	6	5

=== Top half ===
First round
1	(Germany) A Huber	6	1	7^{7}
Q	(Russia) L Krasnoroutskaya	1	6	6^{4}
(Spain) M Sánchez Lorenzo	7	6
Q	(Hungary) K Marosi	5	1
(Belarus) O Barabanschikova	6	4	5
(Czech Republic) S Kleinová	2	6	7
LL	(Romania) C Cristea	1	2
6	(Spain) C Torrens Valero	6	6
3	(France) A-G Sidot	5	6	6
Q	(Hungary) A Földényi	7	2	4
(Netherlands) A Hopmans	6^{5}	6	3
(Italy) T Garbin	7^{7}	3	6
(Croatia) J Kostanić	6	6
WC	(Portugal) A Cardoso	1	2
(France) A Cocheteux	1	2
7	(Hungary) R Kuti-Kis	6	6

Second round
1	(Germany) A Huber	6	6
(Spain) M Sánchez Lorenzo	2	3
(Czech Republic) S Kleinová	3	3
6	(Spain) C Torrens Valero	6	6
3	(France) A-G Sidot	6^{7}	4
(Italy) T Garbin	7^{9}	6
(Croatia) J Kostanić	6	3	3
7	(Hungary) R Kuti-Kis	4	6	6

Quarterfinals
1	(Germany) A Huber	6	7^{7}
6	(Spain) C Torrens Valero	3	6^{2}
(Italy) T Garbin	7^{7}	6
7	(Hungary) R Kuti-Kis	6^{1}	4

Semifinals
1	(Germany) A Huber	6	6
(Italy) T Garbin	3	2

=== Bottom half ===
First round
5	(Italy) S Farina	6	6
(Venezuela) M Vento	4	4
Q	(Italy) F Schiavone	2	6	6
WC	(Portugal) A C Nogueira	6	2	0
(Bulgaria) L Bacheva	7^{7}	6
(Austria) P Wartusch	6^{4}	2
(Switzerland) M Vavrinec	3	6	6
4	(France) S Pitkowski	6	1	1
8	(Spain) Á Montolio	6	4	6
(Australia) A Molik	1	6	1
(Netherlands) S Noorlander	6	3	6
(Slovenia) K Srebotnik	3	6	2
(Netherlands) K Boogert	0	6	6^{5}
(Belgium) L Courtois	6	3	7^{7}
LL	(Spain) N Llagostera Vives	5	7	3
2	(France) N Dechy	7	5	6

Second round
5	(Italy) S Farina	7	6
Q	(Italy) F Schiavone	5	2
(Bulgaria) L Bacheva	2	6	6^{5}
(Switzerland) M Vavrinec	6	3	7^{7}
8	(Spain) Á Montolio	6	6
(Netherlands) S Noorlander	1	4
(Belgium) L Courtois	6^{5}	5
2	(France) N Dechy	7^{7}	7

Quarterfinals
5	(Italy) S Farina	6	6
(Switzerland) M Vavrinec	3	2
8	(Spain) Á Montolio	3	4
2	(France) N Dechy	6	6

Semifinals
5	(Italy) S Farina	2	4
2	(France) N Dechy	6	6
