= 2001 Estoril Open – Women's doubles =

Women's doubles
- 2001 Estoril Open

Final
- Champions: (Czech Republic) Květa Hrdličková; (Germany) Barbara Rittner
- Runners-up: (Slovenia) Tina Križan; (Slovenia) Katarina Srebotnik
- Score: 3–6, 7–5, 6–1

Events
Singles	men	women
Doubles	men	women
← 2000 ·	Estoril Open	· 2002 →

Tina Križan and Katarina Srebotnik were the defending champions but lost in the final 3–6, 7–5, 6–1 against Květa Hrdličková and Barbara Rittner.

== Seeds ==
Champion seeds are indicated in bold text while text in italics indicates the round in which those seeds were eliminated.

1. (France) Alexandra Fusai / (Italy) Rita Grande (first round)
2. (Italy) Tathiana Garbin / (Slovakia) Janette Husárová (semifinals)
3. (Slovenia) Tina Križan / (Slovenia) Katarina Srebotnik (final)
4. (Netherlands) Kristie Boogert / (Spain) Magüi Serna (withdrew)

== Draw ==
=== Key ===
- Q = Qualifier
- WC = Wild card
- LL = Lucky loser
- Alt = Alternate
- SE = Special exempt
- PR = Protected ranking
- ITF = ITF entry
- JE = Junior exempt
- w/o = Walkover
- r = Retired
- d = Defaulted
- SR = Special ranking

First round

Quarterfinals

Semifinals

Final

1
- (France) A Fusai
- (Italy) R Grande
4
3

- (Spain) R M Andrés
- (Belarus) T Poutchek
**6**
**6**

- (Spain) R M Andrés
- (Belarus) T Poutchek
6^{6}
6^{3}

- (Belgium) E Callens
- (Belgium) J Henin
1
4

- (Germany) A Huber
- (Slovenia) T Pisnik
**7^{8}**
**7^{7}**

- (Germany) A Huber
- (Slovenia) T Pisnik
**6**
**6**

- (Germany) A Huber
- (Slovenia) T Pisnik
6^{4}
3

LL
- (Australia) T Musgrave
- (Italy) F Schiavone
3
3

- (Czech Republic) K Hrdličková
- (Germany) B Rittner
**7^{7}**
**6**

- (Czech Republic) K Hrdličková
- (Germany) B Rittner
**6**
**6**

- (Czech Republic) K Hrdličková
- (Germany) B Rittner
3
**7**
**6**

- (Spain) M J Martínez
- (Spain) A Medina Garrigues
6^{4}
4

- (South Africa) K Grant
- (Spain) M Ramón Climent
**6**
5
1

- (South Africa) K Grant
- (Spain) M Ramón Climent
**7^{7}**
**6**

- (Czech Republic) Květa Hrdličková
- (Germany) Barbara Rittner
3
**7**
**6**

- (Bulgaria) L Bacheva
- (Spain) C Torrens Valero
**6**
**6**

3
- (Slovenia) Tina Križan
- (Slovenia) Katarina Srebotnik
**6**
5
1

Q
- (Belarus) O Barabanschikova
- (Switzerland) E Gagliardi
2
2

- (Bulgaria) L Bacheva
- (Spain) C Torrens Valero
**6**
6^{5}
4

- (Slovakia) K Habšudová
- (Bulgaria) M Maleeva
6^{7}
1

3
- (Slovenia) T Križan
- (Slovenia) K Srebotnik
3
**7^{7}**
**6**

3
- (Slovenia) T Križan
- (Slovenia) K Srebotnik
**7^{9}**
**6**

3
- (Slovenia) T Križan
- (Slovenia) K Srebotnik
**6**
**7**

WC
- (Brazil) V Menga
- (Portugal) A C Nogueira
5
3

2
- (Italy) T Garbin
- (Slovakia) J Husárová
3
5

- (Spain) E Bes
- (Spain) L Domínguez Lino
**7**
**6**

- (Spain) E Bes
- (Spain) L Domínguez Lino
4
2

- (Russia) E Bovina
- (Austria) S Plischke
6^{3}
**6**
1

2
- (Italy) T Garbin
- (Slovakia) J Husárová
**6**
**6**

2
- (Italy) T Garbin
- (Slovakia) J Husárová
**7^{7}**
2
**6**
