= 2000 Estoril Open – Women's doubles =

Women's doubles
- 2000 Estoril Open

Final
- Champions: (Slovenia) Tina Križan; (Slovenia) Katarina Srebotnik
- Runners-up: (Netherlands) Amanda Hopmans; (Spain) Cristina Torrens Valero
- Score: 6–0, 7–6^{(11–9)}

Details
- Draw: 16
- Seeds: 4

Events
Singles	men	women
Doubles	men	women
← 1999 ·	Portugal Open	· 2001 →

Alicia Ortuño and Cristina Torrens Valero were the defending champions, but competed this year with different partners.

Ortuño teamed up with Seda Noorlander and lost in quarterfinals to Kristie Boogert and Anne-Gaëlle Sidot.

Torrens Valero teamed up with Amanda Hopmans and lost in the final 6–0, 7–6^{(11–9)} to tournament winners Tina Križan and Katarina Srebotnik.

== Seeds ==
1. (Slovenia) Tina Križan / (Slovenia) Katarina Srebotnik (champions)
2. (Belgium) Laurence Courtois / (Australia) Alicia Molik (quarterfinals)
3. (Netherlands) Kristie Boogert / (France) Anne-Gaëlle Sidot (semifinals)
4. (Romania) Cătălina Cristea / (Austria) Patricia Wartusch (first round)

== Draw ==
Key

- Q = Qualifier
- WC = Wild card
- LL = Lucky loser
- Alt = Alternate
- ITF = ITF entry
- PR = Protected ranking
- SR = Special ranking
- SE = Special exempt
- JE = Junior exempt
- JR = Junior Accelerator Programme entrant
- CO = College Accelerator Programme entrant
- NG = Next Gen Accelerator Program entrant
- w/o = Walkover
- r = Retired
- d = Defaulted

=== Draw ===
First round

Quarterfinals

Semifinals

Final

1
- (Slovenia) T Križan
- (Slovenia) K Srebotnik
6
6

- (South Africa) K Grant
- (United States) R Jensen
1
3

1
- (Slovenia) T Križan
- (Slovenia) K Srebotnik
2
7
6

- (France) N Dechy
- (France) S Pitkowski
2
3

Q
- (Czech Republic) S Kleinová
- (Venezuela) M Vento-Kabchi
6
5
2

Q
- (Czech Republic) S Kleinová
- (Venezuela) M Vento-Kabchi
6
6

1
- (Slovenia) T Križan
- (Slovenia) K Srebotnik
6
6

3
- (Netherlands) K Boogert
- (France) A-G Sidot
6
6

3
- (Netherlands) K Boogert
- (France) A-G Sidot
3
4

- (Croatia) J Kostanić
- (Italy) An Serra Zanetti
2
3

3
- (Netherlands) K Boogert
- (France) A-G Sidot
6
5
6

- (Netherlands) S Noorlander
- (Spain) A Ortuño
6
6

- (Netherlands) S Noorlander
- (Spain) A Ortuño
0
7
4

- (Bulgaria) L Bacheva
- (Spain) M Sánchez Lorenzo
3
2

1
- (Slovenia) T Križan
- (Slovenia) K Srebotnik
6
7^{11}

- (Spain) E Bes
- (Spain) G Riera
6
6

- (Netherlands) A Hopmans
- (Spain) C Torrens Valero
0
6^{9}

WC
- (Portugal) Cristina Correia
- (Portugal) F Piedade
1
2

- (Spain) E Bes
- (Spain) G Riera
6
2
5

- (Netherlands) A Hopmans
- (Spain) C Torrens Valero
6
6

- (Netherlands) A Hopmans
- (Spain) C Torrens Valero
2
6
7

4
- (Romania) C Cristea
- (Austria) P Wartusch
3
4

- (Netherlands) A Hopmans
- (Spain) C Torrens Valero
6
6

- (Italy) T Garbin
- (Hungary) K Marosi
2
3

- (Spain) RM Andrés Rodríguez
- (Spain) C Martínez Granados
4
4

- (Spain) RM Andrés Rodríguez
- (Spain) C Martínez Granados
6
6

- (Spain) RM Andrés Rodríguez
- (Spain) C Martínez Granados
6
6

- (France) A Cocheteux
- (Slovakia) J Husárová
7^{9}
4
4

2
- (Belgium) L Courtois
- (Australia) A Molik
4
3

2
- (Belgium) L Courtois
- (Australia) A Molik
6^{7}
6
6
