= 2000 Estoril Open – Men's doubles =

Men's doubles
- 2000 Estoril Open

Final
- Champions: (United States) Donald Johnson; (South Africa) Piet Norval
- Runners-up: (South Africa) David Adams; (Australia) Joshua Eagle
- Score: 6–4, 7–5

Events
Singles	men	women
Doubles	men	women
← 1999 ·	Estoril Open	· 2001 →

Tomás Carbonell and Donald Johnson were the defending champions, but did not participate together this year. Carbonell partnered Juan Balcells, losing in the first round. Johnson partnered Piet Norval and successfully defended his title.

Johnson and Norval won in the final 6–4, 7–5, against David Adams and Joshua Eagle.

== Seeds ==
1. (United States) Donald Johnson / (South Africa) Piet Norval (champions)
2. (Czech Republic) Daniel Vacek / (Socialist Federal Republic of Yugoslavia) Nenad Zimonjić (first round)
3. (South Africa) Marius Barnard / (South Africa) Robbie Koenig (semifinals)
4. (South Africa) David Adams / (Australia) Joshua Eagle (final)

== Draw ==
=== Key ===
- Q = Qualifier
- WC = Wild card
- LL = Lucky loser
- Alt = Alternate
- ITF = ITF entry
- PR = Protected ranking
- SR = Special ranking
- SE = Special exempt
- JE = Junior exempt
- JR = Junior Accelerator Programme entrant
- CO = College Accelerator Programme entrant
- NG = Next Gen Accelerator Program entrant
- w/o = Walkover
- r = Retired
- d = Defaulted

=== Draw ===
First round

Quarterfinals

Semifinals

Final

1
- (United States) D Johnson
- (South Africa) P Norval
6
7

- (South Africa) N Godwin
- (Australia) M Hill
1
5

1
- (United States) D Johnson
- (South Africa) P Norval
5
6
6

Q
- (Spain) A Berasategui
- (Spain) F Roig
7
1
3

- (Argentina) D Orsanic
- (Argentina) M Rodríguez
7
4
3

- (Argentina) D Orsanic
- (Argentina) M Rodríguez
5
6
6

1
- (United States) D Johnson
- (South Africa) P Norval
6
7^{7}

3
- (South Africa) M Barnard
- (South Africa) R Koenig
3
6
7

3
- (South Africa) M Barnard
- (South Africa) R Koenig
2
6^{4}

- (Germany) M-K Goellner
- (South Africa) C Haggard
6
3
5

3
- (South Africa) M Barnard
- (South Africa) R Koenig
7^{7}
6

- (Spain) JI Carrasco
- (Spain) J Velasco Jr.
6
6

- (Spain) JI Carrasco
- (Spain) J Velasco Jr.
6^{4}
3

- (North Macedonia) A Kitinov
- (Romania) A Pavel
4
4

1
- (United States) D Johnson
- (South Africa) P Norval
6
7

- (United States) D Bowen
- (Socialist Federal Republic of Yugoslavia) D Vemić
6
6

4
- (South Africa) D Adams
- (Australia) J Eagle
4
5

- (Spain) J Balcells
- (Spain) T Carbonell
4
4

- (United States) D Bowen
- (Socialist Federal Republic of Yugoslavia) D Vemić
5
4

WC
- (Portugal) V Ferreira
- (Portugal) H Lopes
2
0

4
- (South Africa) D Adams
- (Australia) J Eagle
7
6

4
- (South Africa) D Adams
- (Australia) J Eagle
6
6

4
- (South Africa) D Adams
- (Australia) J Eagle
2
7
7

WC
- (Portugal) J Cunha e Silva
- (Portugal) B Mota
6
6

WC
- (Portugal) J Cunha e Silva
- (Portugal) B Mota
6
5
5

WC
- (Angola) N Almeida
- (Mozambique) F Mata
4
2

WC
- (Portugal) J Cunha e Silva
- (Portugal) B Mota
6
7^{7}

- (Portugal) N Marques
- (Belgium) T Vanhoudt
6
6

- (Portugal) N Marques
- (Belgium) T Vanhoudt
4
6^{3}

2
- (Czech Republic) D Vacek
- (Socialist Federal Republic of Yugoslavia) N Zimonjić
2
3
