= Victoria Azarenka =

Belarusian tennis player (born 1989)

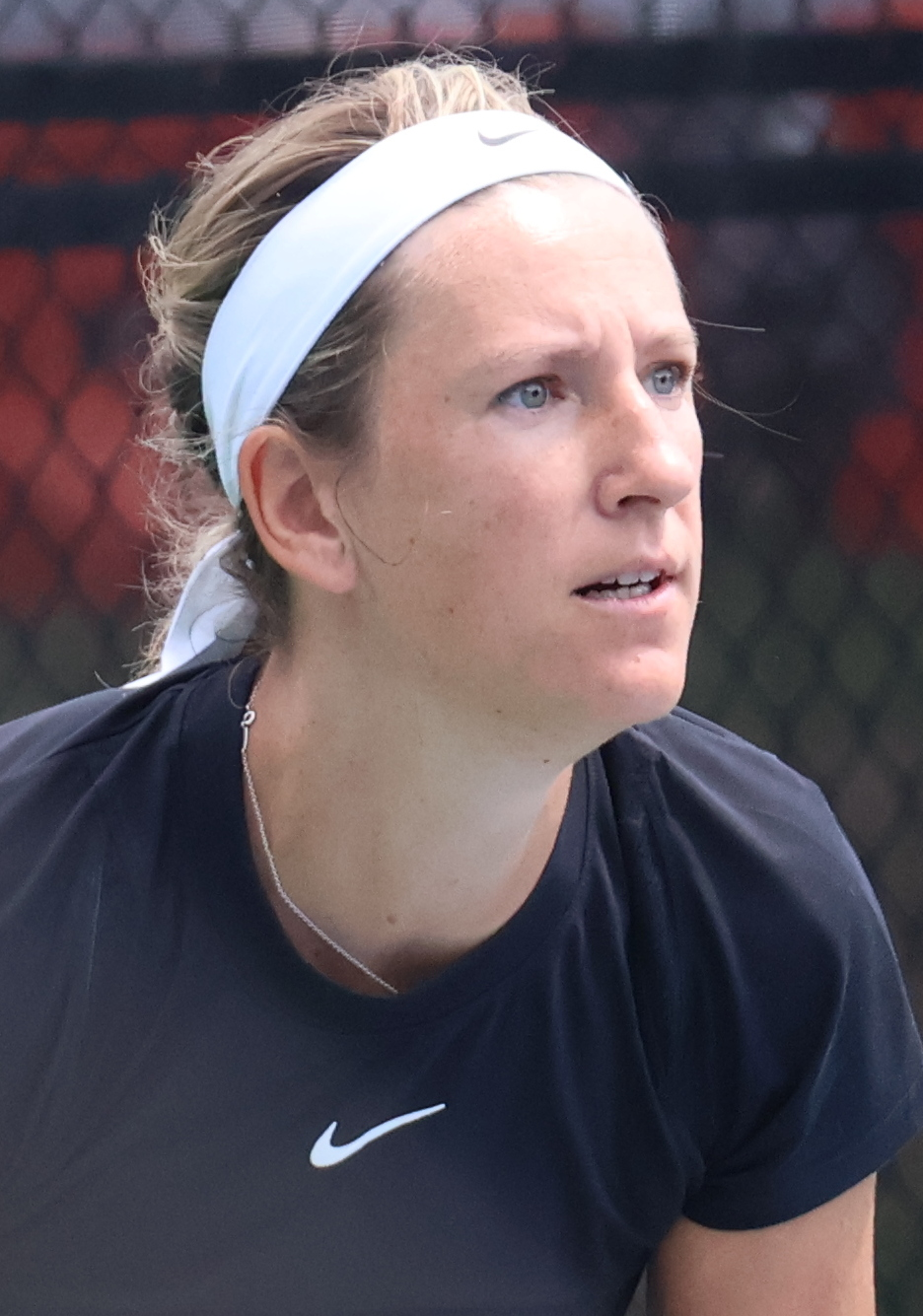
- Azarenka at the 2024 DC Open
- Native name: Вікторыя Азаранка
- Country (sports): Belarus
- Residence: Boca Raton, Florida, United States
- Born: 31 July 1989 (age 37) Minsk, Byelorussian SSR, Soviet Union
- Height: 1.83 m (6 ft 0 in)
- Turned pro: 2003
- Plays: Right-handed (two-handed backhand)
- Prize money: US$38,890,473: 6th all-time in earnings

Singles
- Career record: 640–272
- Career titles: 21
- Highest ranking: No. 1 (30 January 2012)

Grand Slam singles results
- Australian Open: W (2012, 2013)
- French Open: SF (2013)
- Wimbledon: SF (2011, 2012)
- US Open: F (2012, 2013, 2020)

Other tournaments
- Tour Finals: F (2011)
- Olympic Games: Bronze (2012)

Doubles
- Career record: 189–75
- Career titles: 10
- Highest ranking: No. 7 (7 July 2008)

Grand Slam doubles results
- Australian Open: F (2008, 2011)
- French Open: F (2009)
- Wimbledon: QF (2008)
- US Open: F (2019)

Mixed doubles
- Career titles: 3

Grand Slam mixed doubles results
- Australian Open: F (2007)
- French Open: W (2008)
- Wimbledon: F (2018)
- US Open: W (2007)

Other mixed doubles tournaments
- Olympic Games: W (2012)

Team competitions
- Fed Cup: 21–5
Medal record
Representing Belarus
Olympic Games
Gold medal – first place	2012 London	Mixed doubles
Bronze medal – third place	2012 London	Singles

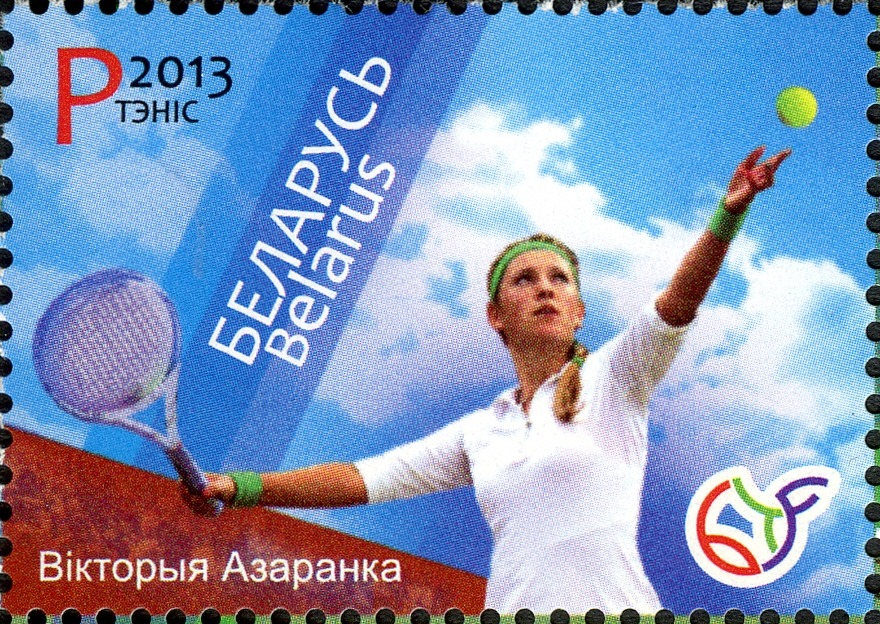
Azarenka on a Belarusian postage stamp

Victoria Fiodaraŭna Azarenka (Note: Belarusian: Вікторыя Фёдараўна Азаранка, romanized: Viktoryya Fyodarawna Azaranka; Russian: Виктория Фёдоровна Азаренко, romanized: Viktoriya Fyodorovna Azarenko) (born 31 July 1989) is a Belarusian former tennis player. She has been ranked as the world No. 1 in singles by the WTA and held the position for a total of 51 weeks, including as the year-end No. 1 in 2012. Azarenka has won 21 WTA Tour-level singles titles, including two majors at the 2012 and 2013 Australian Opens, becoming the first Belarusian to win a major singles title.

Azarenka is also a three-time finalist at the US Open, finishing runner-up to Serena Williams in both 2012 and 2013 and to Naomi Osaka in 2020. In singles, she has won six Premier Mandatory tournaments (including the Sunshine Double in 2016), four Premier 5 tournaments, and the singles bronze medal at the 2012 London Olympics. She was runner-up at the 2011 WTA Finals to Petra Kvitová. She finished with a year-end top 10 singles ranking from 2009 to 2013.

Azarenka has won ten doubles titles on WTA Tour (including one WTA 1000, two Premier Mandatory, and two Premier 5 titles), reached four major finals in women's doubles, and reached a career-high ranking of No. 7 on 7 July 2008. She has won three mixed doubles titles — two major titles at the 2007 US Open with compatriot Max Mirnyi and the 2008 French Open with Bob Bryan, and the Olympic gold medal in mixed doubles at the 2012 London Olympics with Mirnyi.

== Early life ==
Azarenka was born in Minsk, Byelorussian SSR, Soviet Union to Alla and Fedor Azarenka. Her tennis idol is German former player Steffi Graf. In an interview, Azarenka said "Graf's Calendar Golden Slam in 1988 is my biggest motivation."

== Career ==
Azarenka debuted on the ITF Junior Circuit in November 2003 in Israel, winning one doubles title with countrywoman Olga Govortsova. At Wimbledon, Azarenka reached the semifinals of the girls' competition, only to be defeated by eventual runner-up Ana Ivanovic, despite having two match points in the marathon third set. She continued to participate in ITF tournaments in 2004, and at the end of the season she had a singles rank of 508 on the WTA Tour.

At age 15, Azarenka moved full-time to Scottsdale, Arizona, United States, from Minsk, Belarus, to train and live. In this she was aided by National Hockey League goalie Nikolai Khabibulin and his wife, who was a friend of Azarenka's mother.

Azarenka had a successful year in 2005, winning two junior Grand Slams: the Australian (she would eventually win the seniors' competition in 2012 and 2013) and US championships. She ended the season as the junior world No. 1 and was named the 2005 World Champion by the ITF, becoming the first Belarusian to do so. In addition, she reached her first semifinal on the main tour in Guangzhou, China. She went from the qualifying draw of the tournament to the main draw, where she defeated Martina Suchá and Peng Shuai, before losing to the eventual champion Yan Zi.

Junior Slam results:

- Australian Open: W (2005)
- French Open: –
- Wimbledon: SF (2004, 2005)
- US Open: W (2005)

=== 2006: US Open third round ===
In February 2006 in Memphis, Azarenka defeated her first top-20 player, Nicole Vaidišová, and defeated her second top-30 player in Jelena Janković at Miami that same year. On clay, Azarenka pushed 2004 French Open champion Anastasia Myskina to a third set in Rome, and took clay-court specialist Anabel Medina Garrigues to 9–7 in the third set in the first round at Roland Garros. At the 2006 Wimbledon Championships, Azarenka lost in the first round to 2005 Wimbledon and 2006 French Open junior champion and wildcard Agnieszka Radwańska.

At the 2006 US Open, she recorded her first win over Myskina in the first round, and lost to Anna Chakvetadze in the third round, her best result in a Grand Slam event to that date. In her next tournament, Azarenka reached her second pro-level semifinal in Tashkent, losing to Sun Tiantian. She finished the year reaching the final of an ITF event in Pittsburgh, losing to Canadian Aleksandra Wozniak.

=== 2007: First WTA Tour final ===
Ranked world No. 96, Azarenka began the year by playing two tournaments in Australia. She lost in the second round of qualifying at the Hobart International. At the Australian Open, Azarenka reached the third round of a Grand Slam tournament in singles for the second consecutive time, but lost to world No. 11, Jelena Janković, in straight sets.

She was upset in the first round of the French Open by Karin Knapp of Italy, and at Wimbledon, she lost in the third round to 14th-seeded Nicole Vaidišová.

At the US Open, Azarenka upset former world No. 1, Martina Hingis, in the third round before 2004 US Open champion Svetlana Kuznetsova beat her in the fourth round. In mixed doubles, Azarenka and countryman Max Mirnyi won the title, defeating Meghann Shaughnessy and Leander Paes.

She ended her year at the Tier I Kremlin Cup in Moscow, where she defeated world No. 4, Maria Sharapova, in the second round, in their first meeting. She then lost to the eventual winner of the tournament, world No. 14 Elena Dementieva, in the quarterfinal. At the same tournament, Azarenka and her doubles partner Tatiana Poutchek, also of Belarus, lost in the final to the world No. 3 team of Liezel Huber and Cara Black, in three sets. Azarenka's results at the Kremlin Cup elevated her rankings to career highs of world No. 27 in singles and world No. 29 in doubles.

=== 2008: Australian Open final in doubles ===
Azarenka began the year at the Australian Women's Hardcourts tournament in Gold Coast. Unseeded, she reached the semifinals, where she beat fifth-seeded Shahar Pe'er of Israel, Azarenka's sixth top-20 victory. In her third career WTA Tour final, she lost to Li Na, but the points she earned in this tournament were enough to improve her ranking to a career-best world No. 25.

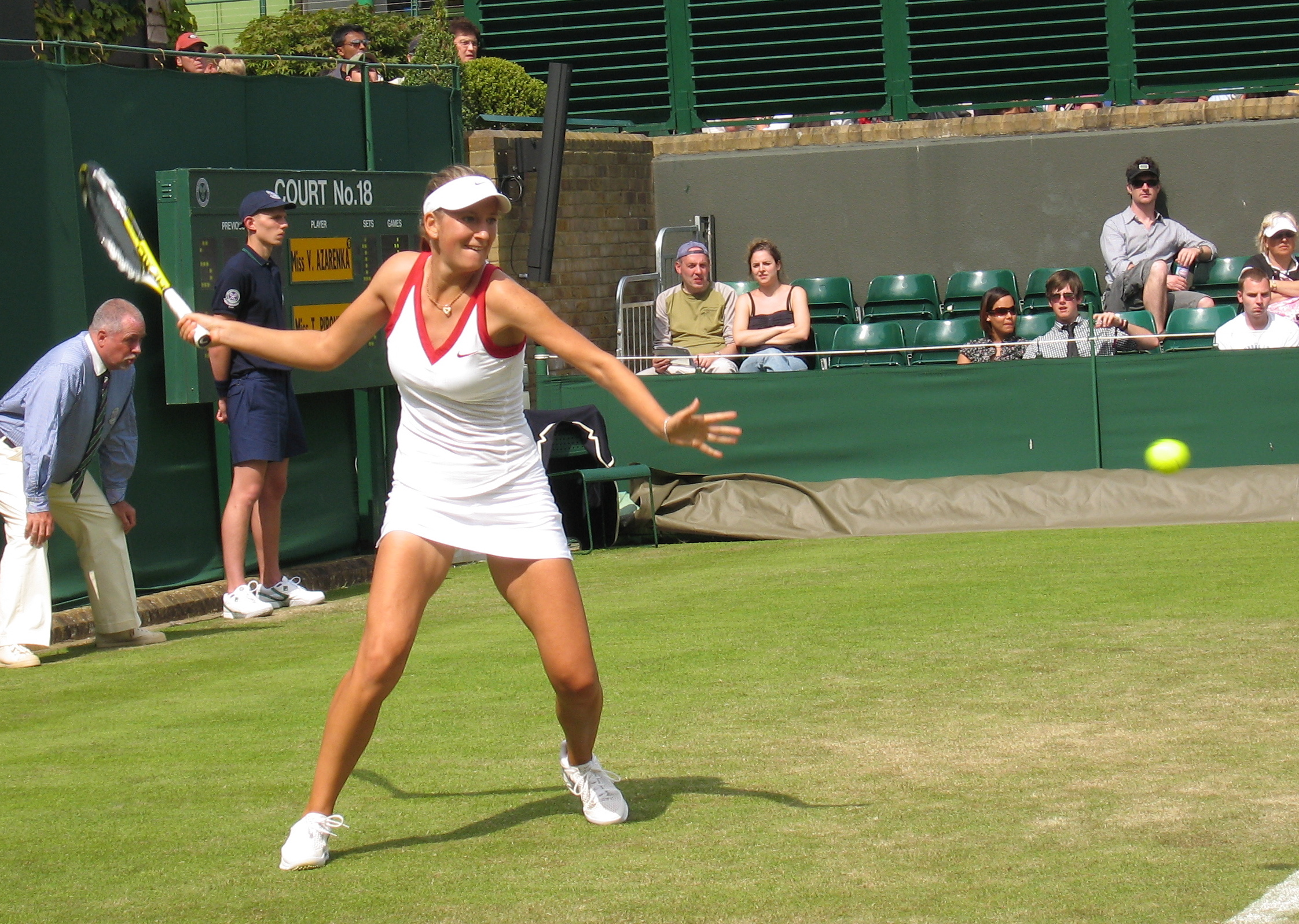
Azarenka at 2008 Wimbledon

Azarenka was seeded 26th at the Australian Open. This was her first appearance as a seeded player in a Grand Slam singles tournament. She showed no ill effects from a leg injury while winning her first two matches, but lost in the third round to seventh-seeded, defending champion and future rival Serena Williams. In doubles, Azarenka and her partner Pe'er were seeded 12th. They made it to the finals, before losing to the unseeded team of Kateryna and Alona Bondarenko.

Azarenka entered the French Open as the form player of the clay court season, having reached the semifinals in Berlin and the quarterfinals in Rome. Seeded 16th, she won her first three matches in straight sets, for the loss of only six games. In the second round, she defeated Sorana Cîrstea of Romania, before defeating 18th-seeded and future French Open champion Francesca Schiavone of Italy in the third round. She then lost to fourth-seeded Kuznetsova in the fourth round. Azarenka teamed with American Bob Bryan to win the mixed doubles title at the French Open, defeating the top seeded team of Katarina Srebotnik and Nenad Zimonjić in the final.

At Wimbledon, Azarenka was seeded 16th in singles and 6th in doubles (with Pe'er). In singles, Azarenka was defeated by 21st-seeded Nadia Petrova of Russia in the third round in two close tiebreaks. In doubles, Azarenka and Pe'er reached the quarterfinals, where they lost to the top-seeded team of Cara Black and Liezel Huber. At the Olympic tennis tournament in Beijing, Azarenka lost to Venus Williams in the third round. Azarenka was seeded 14th at the US Open, but was defeated by 21st seed Caroline Wozniacki in the third round.

=== 2009: Three titles, top 10, major doubles final ===
Azarenka began the year at the Brisbane International as the second seed. She defeated Kateryna Bondarenko, Jarmila Groth, Lucie Šafářová, and Sara Errani, all in straight sets to reach her fifth career final. In the final, Azarenka defeated third seed Marion Bartoli to win her first career title. Azarenka was seeded 13th at the Australian Open. She advanced to the fourth round for the first time, winning the first set against world No. 2, Serena Williams, before retiring citing heat stress.

At the Cellular South Cup in Memphis, Azarenka was seeded second. She won her second tour title by beating her doubles partner and top seeded Caroline Wozniacki in the final. Afterwards, Wozniacki and Azarenka won the doubles title, beating Michaëlla Krajicek and Yuliana Fedak in the final. At the Indian Wells Open, Azarenka was seeded eighth and reached the semifinals, where she lost to her doubles partner and eventual champion Vera Zvonareva. Because of her performance at this tournament, Azarenka improved her singles ranking to a career-best world No. 10. She was the second woman from Belarus ever to be ranked that high, following Natasha Zvereva who was ranked world No. 5 in the late 1980s. At the Miami Open in Key Biscayne, Florida, Azarenka was seeded 11th. She defeated world No. 1 and two-time defending champion, Serena Williams, in the final in straight sets. This was Azarenka's first Tier I or Premier Mandatory event title. Azarenka also became the sixth teenage female singles champion in the history of this tournament, with the others being Steffi Graf, Monica Seles, Martina Hingis, Venus Williams, and Gabriela Sabatini. By winning this tournament, Azarenka's ranking increased to a new career high of world No. 8.

Her next tournament was on clay at the Porsche Grand Prix in Stuttgart where she lost to Gisela Dulko in the second round. At the Italian Open, Azarenka lost to Svetlana Kuznetsova in the semifinals. At Roland Garros, Azarenka was seeded ninth. She ousted defending champion Ana Ivanovic in the fourth round, and advanced to her first Grand Slam quarterfinal, where she fell to top seed Dinara Safina in three sets. With her partner Elena Vesnina, Azarenka made the final of the ladies doubles at Roland Garros. In the final, they lost to the Spanish pairing of Garrigues and Ruano Pascual. She withdrew from her first match at the Eastbourne International, the warm-up for Wimbledon, citing a hip injury. Azarenka was seeded eighth at Wimbledon. She fell to second seed and eventual winner Serena Williams in the quarterfinals.

Receiving a bye in the first round at the Los Angeles, Azarenka fell to Maria Sharapova. In Cincinnati, Azarenka lost to Jelena Janković in the third round, committing 11 double faults. At the Rogers Cup in Toronto, she was seeded ninth. She lost to returning Kim Clijsters in the second round. At the US Open, Azarenka was seeded eighth. She fell to Francesca Schiavone in the third round. Seeded eighth at the Pan Pacific Open in Tokyo, she lost to Li Na in the quarterfinals, in a third set tiebreak, giving up a 5–1 lead in the first set. In her next tournament the China Open, Azarenka was seeded ninth. She lost in the second round to recent Tokyo champion Maria Sharapova, while serving for the match twice. She intended to play the Kremlin Cup in Moscow, but she withdrew. At the year-end WTA Championships in Doha, Azarenka vanquished Jelena Janković in her first-round robin-match. In her second match, however, Azarenka was defeated by Caroline Wozniacki. Azarenka failed to convert a match point in the final set in which she led by a break on four occasions. Azarenka also conceded her serve at 5–5, to leave Wozniacki serving for the match after receiving a point penalty for racket abuse. Due to her loss to Wozniacki, Azarenka had to defeat second alternate Agnieszka Radwańska to qualify for the semifinals. She led with a double break, before going on to lose nine of the next ten games, eventually conceding the match and retiring while trailing in the third set, citing severe cramping.

Azarenka ended the year ranked world No. 7, with a 45–15 win–loss record, having won three titles and qualified for the year-end championships for the first time in her career.

=== 2010: Steady ranking ===
Azarenka began the season at the Hong Kong Tennis Classic exhibition. She was part of Team Europe, along with Caroline Wozniacki and Stefan Edberg. In her first match, she defeated Gisela Dulko. The match was played best of one set due to rain. She withdrew from her remaining matches due to illness. She was seeded sixth at the Medibank International. She won her first three matches but in the semifinals, she fell to fifth seed Elena Dementieva.

At the Australian Open, she was seeded seventh. In the fourth round against ninth seed Vera Zvonareva she rallied to win, but lost to Serena Williams in the quarterfinal. Azarenka was up a set and four games before Williams came back to win in three sets. This was the third consecutive year she has lost to Williams at this tournament. Seeded fourth at the Dubai Tennis Championships, on her way to the final, she defeated Vera Zvonareva in the quarterfinals and Agnieszka Radwańska in the semifinals. In the final, she lost to defending champion Venus Williams. At the BNP Paribas Open, she was seeded third, but was upset in the third round by María José Martínez Sánchez. At the Sony Ericsson Open, where she was the defending champion and fourth seed, she lost in fourth round to 14th seed and eventual champion Kim Clijsters. This was the fourth match in the five tournaments this year that Azarenka lost to eventual champions.

At the Andalucia Tennis Experience, she was the top seed but retired in her quarterfinal match against María José Martínez Sánchez, citing a left thigh injury.

Seeded third at the Family Circle Cup, she retired from her first match while leading against qualifier Christina McHale. At the Porsche Grand Prix, she was upset in the second round by qualifier Anna Lapushchenkova, who was ranked No. 138 at the time. At the Italian Open, as the ninth seed, Azarenka was defeated by Ana Ivanovic.

As the tenth seed at the Madrid Open, Azarenka retired from her first round match against Peng Shuai citing a groin injury. At the 2010 French Open, Azarenka was defeated in the first round by unseeded Gisela Dulko. As she reached the quarterfinals in 2009, this loss caused Azarenka to drop to world No. 15. Azarenka was unseeded at the Aegon International. Azarenka fell to qualifier Ekaterina Makarova in the final.

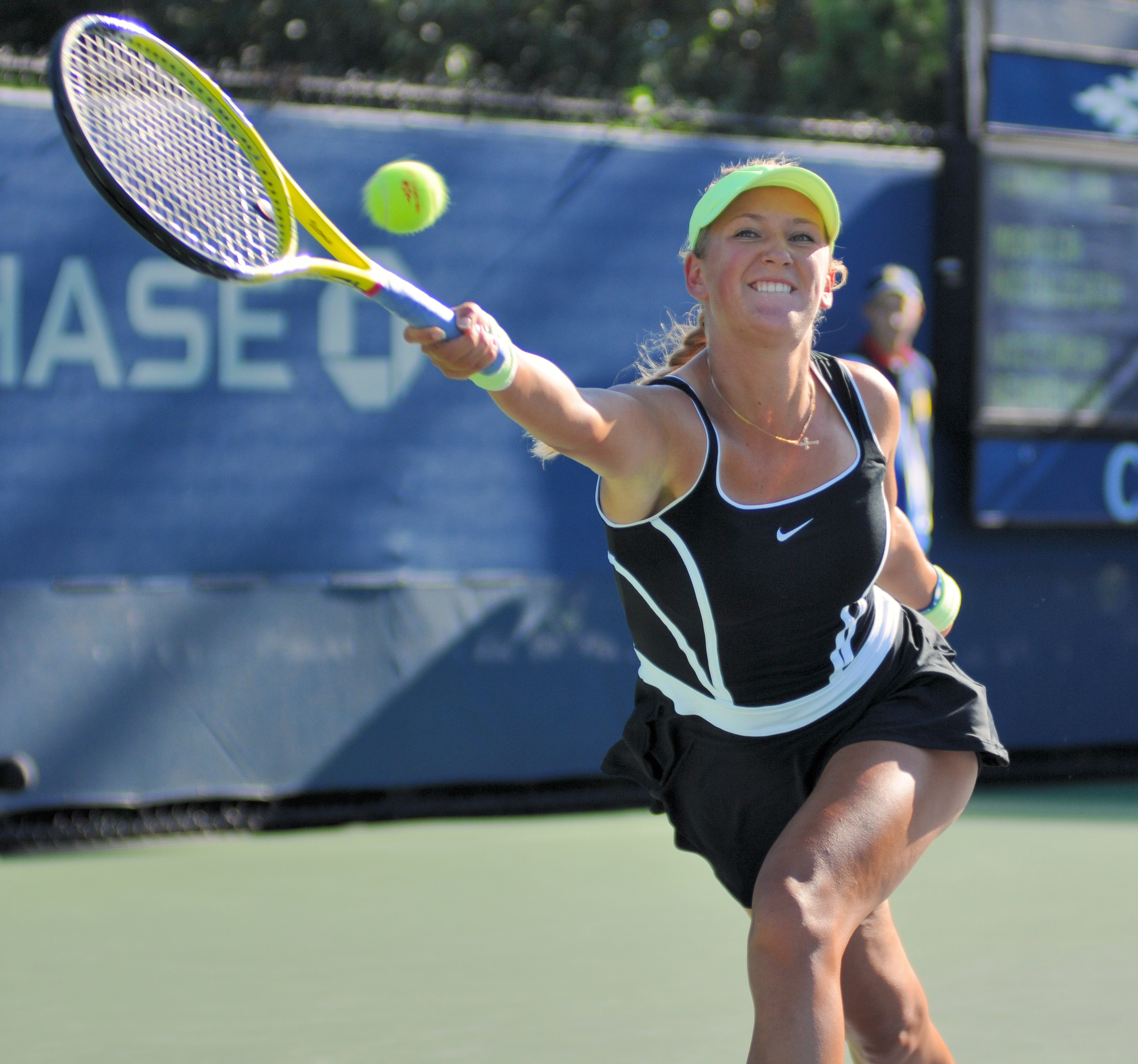
Azarenka at the 2010 US Open

Azarenka was seeded 14th at Wimbledon. She lost to eventual semifinalist Petra Kvitová in the third round. The defeat dropped Azarenka to world No. 18, as she was defending quarterfinal points from 2009.

I don't know. I just don't like to look for excuses, you know, the lights, the fans, I don't know everything. To me, I'm just very disappointed with the way I played.

— Victoria Azarenka after her first round loss to Ana Ivanovic in Cincinnati.

To begin the summer hardcourt season, Azarenka competed in the Stanford Classic as a wildcard entrant and eighth seed. Azarenka defeated Sharapova in the final, after defeating top seed Samantha Stosur in the semifinals, to win her first title since April 2009. The win propelled Azarenka to world No. 12. Despite being the favourite to win the Mercury Insurance Open, Azarenka withdrew to recover from a right shoulder injury.

Seeded ninth at the Western & Southern Open, Azarenka was stunned in the first round by world No. 62, Ana Ivanovic, despite serving for the match twice in the second set, and being within two points of victory on Ivanovic's serve; it was Azarenka's second defeat by Ivanovic in 2010. However, she won the doubles title, partnering with Maria Kirilenko, defeating Lisa Raymond and Rennae Stubbs. 1 September 2010, daytime, at the US Open, losing 0–4 during her second round against Gisela Dulko, Azarenka collapsed on the court. There were concerns that the cause of the fall was heat-related. Azarenka was taken to a local hospital for treatment and was diagnosed with a concussion after hitting her head whilst warming up before the match during a sprint exercise. Azarenka won only seven Grand Slam matches for the entire year, matching her 2007 tally.

At the Pan Pacific Open, she lost to Caroline Wozniacki in the semifinals in three sets. Azarenka re-entered the top 10 after this run. At the China Open, Azarenka retired in her second-round match to Timea Bacsinszky. At the Kremlin Cup Azarenka, as the second seed, defeated Maria Kirilenko in the final, coming back from 4–0 down in the second set to win her fifth career title. Azarenka's performance in Moscow qualified her for the year-end Tour Championships, where she was in the White Group as the eighth seed. In her first round-robin match, Azarenka lost to Vera Zvonareva, and then lost to Kim Clijsters in her second match. This assured that she did not qualify for the semifinals. In her final match of the tournament and season, she defeated Janković for the second year in a row. Azarenka ended the year as world No. 10, her second consecutive year-end top-10 finish.

=== 2011: Miami Open title, WTA Tour Championships final ===
Azarenka began her year at the Medibank International as the seventh seed, where she lost to Kim Clijsters in the quarterfinals. At the 2011 Australian Open Azarenka was seeded eighth. She lost to the ninth seed and eventual finalist, Li Na in the fourth round. Azarenka partnered with Maria Kirilenko in the women's doubles event, but the pair lost to Gisela Dulko and Flavia Pennetta in the final. Azarenka then travelled to Israel to compete in Fed Cup. Belarus beat Croatia, Austria, and Greece in the group stage, without losing a match. The Belarusian team then defeated Poland 2–0 to qualify for the World Group II play-Offs in April where they played Estonia.

Azarenka's next tournament was the Dubai Championships, where she was seeded seventh. She lost to Flavia Pennetta in the third round. Azarenka then competed at the Qatar Open as the sixth seed, but lost to Daniela Hantuchová in the first round in three sets. Azarenka's next event was the BNP Paribas Open, where she competed as the eighth seed. She retired in the quarterfinals against world No. 1 Caroline Wozniacki, whilst trailing 0–3, due to a left leg injury.

Azarenka then competed at the Miami Open as the eighth seed. She reached her second final at the event, where she defeated 16th seed Maria Sharapova to win the title.

At the Andalucia Tennis Experience, Azarenka was the top seed and dropped only fourteen games on her way to the final. She defeated Irina-Camelia Begu in the final. Azarenka's victory, and Sam Stosur's inability to defend her points at Charleston, ensured that Azarenka would reach a career high of world No. 5. She then participated in Belarus' 5–0 win over Estonia in the Fed Cup. In her next tournament the Porsche Grand Prix, Azarenka retired after winning the first set of her first match, ending her 12-match winning streak.

At the Madrid Open, Azarenka was seeded fourth. She lost in the final in straight sets to Petra Kvitová, but still rose to a career-high world No. 4. Azarenka then reached the quarterfinals of the Internazionali d'Italia in Rome, where she was up a set, before retiring to eventual champion Maria Sharapova.

Azarenka was the fourth seed at the French Open. She beat Andrea Hlaváčková in the first round, Pauline Parmentier in the second round, 30th seed Roberta Vinci in the third round, and Ekaterina Makarova in the fourth round to reach her fourth career Grand Slam quarterfinal. She lost to Li Na in the quarterfinals. Azarenka was the fourth seed at Wimbledon. She beat 25th seed Daniela Hantuchová in a three-set third-round match, before beating Nadia Petrova. She followed that up with an easy victory over Tamira Paszek, advancing to the semifinals of a major for the first time. Azarenka was beaten by Czech player and eventual champion, Petra Kvitová, going down in three sets.

Her next tournament was the Stanford Classic, where she was the defending champion and top seed. Azarenka was ousted by 124th-ranked Marina Erakovic from New Zealand in the second round. Despite her 'horrible match' in singles, Azarenka claimed the doubles title with partner Kirilenko. The next tournament Azarenka played was the Rogers Cup, where she was seeded fourth. After a bye, Azarenka beat Stéphanie Dubois, María José Martínez Sánchez, and Galina Voskoboeva, before being stopped by Serena Williams in the semifinals. Azarenka reached the doubles final with Kirilenko, but the team withdrew citing a hand injury to Azarenka. Azarenka pulled out of the Western & Southern Open with the same injury.

Azarenka's next tournament was the US Open, where she was seeded fourth. She made it to the third round, where she was defeated by 28th seed and eventual runner-up Serena Williams. Despite the early loss, she reached a new career high of No. 3 in the world. Azarenka reached the semifinals of the Pan Pacific Open, losing to eventual champion Agnieszka Radwańska. In doing so she qualified for the year-end championships in Istanbul. The Belarusian participated in the China Open, the last of the four mandatory events for 2011, as the second seed. She defeated Polona Hercog in the second round, after receiving a first-round bye. She then withdrew from the tournament, citing a right foot strain.

Azarenka would win her third title of the year at the Luxembourg Open, defeating Monica Niculescu in the final. Azarenka was placed in the White Group at the Tour Championships. She beat Samantha Stosur and Li Na in her first two Round Robin matches. She secured the move to the semifinals despite her loss in three sets to Marion Bartoli, a substitute for Maria Sharapova. She then beat Vera Zvonareva to move to the final where she lost to Petra Kvitová in three sets.

=== 2012: First Major title, two Olympic medals, world No. 1 ===
Azarenka claimed her first title of the season at the Sydney International as the third seed. She defeated her first three opponents, Stefanie Vögele, Jelena Janković and Marion Bartoli all in straight sets to advance to the semifinals where she defeated the seventh seed, Agnieszka Radwańska in three sets to reach the final. She went on to win against the defending champion Li Na in three sets.

Azarenka competed at the Australian Open as the third seed, defeating Heather Watson, Casey Dellacqua, Mona Barthel and Iveta Benešová in the first four rounds without dropping a set. In the quarterfinals, Azarenka faced a sterner test against world No. 8, Agnieszka Radwańska, but won in three sets. She then defeated the eleventh seed and defending champion Kim Clijsters to reach her first Major singles final, where she faced the world No. 4 Maria Sharapova. After a nervous start Azarenka proceeded to win the last nine games to win the title. Azarenka recorded her first Grand Slam singles title and became the world No. 1 (with effect from 30 January 2012) in the same match.

Her first tournament as world No. 1 was the Qatar Ladies Open. She won her third title of the year in Doha, defeating Sam Stosur in the final. Azarenka planned to compete at the Dubai Championships. However, after a bye in the first round, she withdrew from the tournament due to an ankle injury. In March, she played in the Indian Wells Open, where she was the top seed. In a re-run of the 2012 Australian Open decider, her opponent in the final was world No. 2 Sharapova, and once again, Azarenka won in straight sets, thus extending her undefeated record in 2012 to 23–0. Azarenka's 26 match win-streak ended in the quarterfinals of the Miami Open in a straights-set loss against Marion Bartoli.

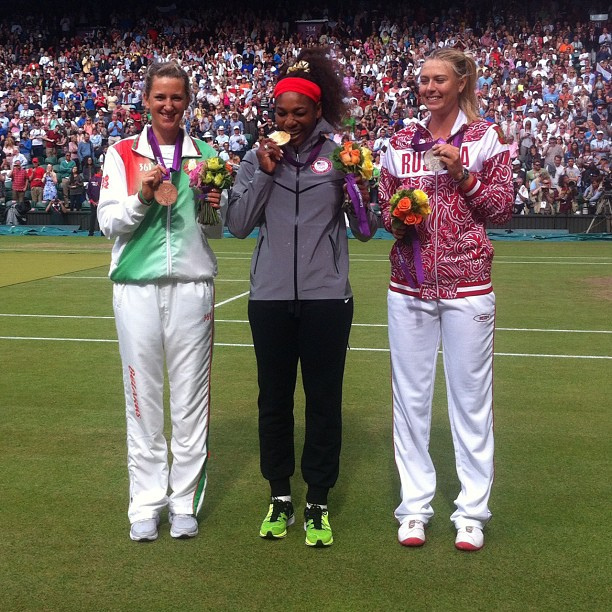
Azarenka (in left) with Olympic bronze medal at the 2012 Summer Olympics. She and Max Mirnyi also won the mixed doubles gold beating Britain's Laura Robson and Andy Murray.

In April, she competed at the Porsche Tennis Grand Prix. Making it to the semifinals she faced Agnieszka Radwańska and won in straight sets. This win meant she had beaten Radwańska in all five matches against her this year. Azarenka would then face world No. 2 Sharapova in the final where she fell in straight sets. Azarenka then competed at the Madrid Open. She made it to the finals but was beaten easily by Serena Williams in straight sets. The result gave Azarenka only her third defeat of the year. Azarenka's next tournament was the Italian Open, she advanced to the third round quite easily but then withdrew from the tournament, citing a right shoulder strain, and avoided a third round clash with Dominika Cibulková.

At the French Open, she defeated Alberta Brianti, Dinah Pfizenmaier and Alexandra Wozniak respectively to qualify for the fourth round. However, in the fourth round, she lost in straight sets against Dominika Cibulková of Slovakia. As a result, she lost her world No. 1 ranking to eventual Roland Garros champion Maria Sharapova. Azarenka then competed at Wimbledon, winning her first four matches in straight sets. She then defeated Tamira Paszek in the quarterfinals, also in straight sets, before losing to Serena Williams for the sixth straight time in the semifinal, bringing their head-to-head 8–1 in Serena's favour. Nonetheless, she regained the world No. 1 ranking after the tournament due to Sharapova's loss in the fourth round.

Later in the month, Azarenka took part in the 2012 Summer Olympics tennis event, held at the All England Club in Wimbledon, London. She entered two events, playing in both the women's singles, and the mixed doubles alongside ATP doubles world No. 1 Max Mirnyi. In singles, Azarenka won her first four matches, all in straight sets, before falling in the semifinals, losing for the third time of the season and the ninth time overall to eventual Gold Medallist Serena Williams. Azarenka rebounded by winning the bronze-medal match over Maria Kirilenko in straight sets, earning the first ever Olympic medal in tennis for Belarus. Azarenka got her first gold medal in the 2012 Summer Olympics on 5 August 2012 with Max Mirnyi for Belarus, defeating Andy Murray and Laura Robson of Great Britain in a tiebreak. Azarenka reached the quarterfinals for the first time at the 2012 US Open, winning her first four matches in straight sets for the loss of only ten games. There, she faced defending champion Samantha Stosur and eliminated her from the tournament in a two-and-a-half hour three-set thriller which was decided by a final-set tiebreak. Azarenka then faced former US Open champion and world No. 3 Maria Sharapova in the semifinal. Azarenka was able to come through the match after being a set down. In the final she faced former US Open champion and world No. 4 Serena Williams, losing for the eighth consecutive time despite serving for the match in the third set.

In mid-September, Azarenka played an exhibition match against Dominika Cibulková in Ho Chi Minh City, Vietnam,[49] winning the match in straight sets. Azarenka then played at the Toray Pan Pacific Open in Tokyo where, in the quarters, she retired from the tournament due to dizziness. She then played the China Open, advancing to the quarterfinals without dropping a set. There she defeated Romina Oprandi and then eased past Marion Bartoli en route to the finals. The finals was set for another top 2 seeded match as it was Azarenka facing world No. 2 Maria Sharapova for the fifth time of the year. Azarenka was able to win the match comfortably. The win gave Azarenka her second Premier Mandatory title of the year and fifth overall title of the year. Azarenka then played at the Generali Ladies Linz, where she advanced to the semifinals without dropping a set. In the semis she faced Irina-Camelia Begu, winning easily. In the finals she faced Germany's Julia Görges and won the match in straight sets, tying Serena with six titles for the year. Azarenka's final tournament of the year was the WTA Tour Championships where she was drawn in the red group along with world No. 3, Serena Williams, world No. 5, Angelique Kerber and world No. 8, Li Na. In match one she beat Kerber but was subsequently beaten by Serena Williams. In her final round-robin match, she beat Li Na, ensuring her year-end No. 1 ranking. As the runner-up of her group, Azarenka faced White Group winner Maria Sharapova in the semifinals. After, clinching the world number one spot in her previous match against Li, she seemed physically drained to compete well and lost to Sharapova in two sets. Azarenka set a new record for single-season prize money in 2012, earning $7.9 million. She also finished the season with a 69–10 win–loss record and six titles, losing five of those matches to Serena Williams, two to Maria Sharapova, one to Marion Bartoli, one to Dominika Cibulková and the remaining loss coming on a retirement to Tamira Paszek.

Azarenka lost to Ekaterina Makarova in the second round of the Madrid Open. She reached the final in the Italian Open by defeating Julia Görges, Ayumi Morita, Sam Stosur, and Sara Errani, but lost to Serena Williams in the final. In the French Open, as the third seed, she reached the semifinal before she was defeated by Maria Sharapova, who ended the tournament as runner-up.

In the first round of the Wimbledon Championships she defeated Maria João Koehler in straight sets, but suffered a knee injury early in the second set. Citing the injury, she withdrew from the Championships before her second round match against Flavia Pennetta.

Following her injury-enforced early exit from Wimbledon, Azarenka returned to action at the Southern California Open, where she was the top seed. After receiving a first-round bye, she defeated Francesca Schiavone, Urszula Radwańska and Ana Ivanovic (the latter in three sets) before losing to Samantha Stosur in straight sets in the championship match. The loss to Stosur marked her first loss against her, after previously winning their first eight encounters.

Azarenka later withdrew from the Rogers Cup, citing a back injury.

Seeded second at Cincinnati, Azarenka received a first round bye, following which she won her first match at the tournament since 2009, when she defeated local hope Vania King in the second round. That was then followed by wins over Magdaléna Rybáriková, Caroline Wozniacki (her first victory against her since 2009) and Jelena Janković, en route to reaching her fifth final of the year, where she defeated Serena Williams in a championship match to pick up her third title for the year.

At the US Open, where Azarenka was seeded second, she reached the final for the second consecutive year. In her first round match, she defeated Dinah Pfizenmaier without losing a game. In her second round match, she defeated Aleksandra Wozniak in straight sets. In her third and fourth round matches, she respectively battled past Alizé Cornet and Ana Ivanovic, coming from a set down to win both matches. In her quarterfinal match, she defeated Daniela Hantuchová in straight sets. In the semifinal match, she defeated surprise semifinalist Flavia Pennetta. However, she lost in the final to Serena Williams in three sets.

Azarenka then endured an unsuccessful Asian swing, losing in the second round to former number one and seven-time Grand Slam champion Venus Williams in straight sets in Tokyo and losing in the first round to Andrea Petkovic in an error-riddled performance in Beijing. Azarenka's 2013 season ended with a poor showing at the 2013 WTA Tour Championships, winning only one of her three-round robin matches and failing to reach the semifinals for the first time since 2010.

=== 2014–15: Injuries and struggle ===
Azarenka's 2014 season was blighted by a foot injury. As a result, she missed five months of the season, and called an early end to her season in September. The injuries forced her to miss seven of her first 16 events of the season, including the 2014 French Open. Azarenka only managed to make it to one final all season, in her first tournament of the year in Brisbane, where she lost to Serena Williams in straight sets. In three other tournaments Azarenka managed to reach the quarterfinals, but failed to progress any further. She lost to Agnieszka Radwańska at the Australian Open and Montreal, and to Ekaterina Makarova at the US Open. Elsewhere, she suffered losses in her opening matches at tournaments in Indian Wells, Eastbourne, and Stanford. At Wimbledon she lost in her second round match to Bojana Jovanovski in three sets. Azarenka's 2014 season ended in September, with her citing injury. She ended the year ranked world No. 32, her lowest finish since 2006.

Azarenka started the 2015 season at the Brisbane International, losing to Karolína Plíšková in three sets, despite having multiple match points. As of being a runner-up last year, she dropped out from the top 40. However, Azarenka reached the fourth round at the Australian Open, beating eight seed Caroline Wozniacki en route, but lost to Dominika Cibulková in three sets.

In Doha, Azarenka scored three wins over top-20 players, against Angelique Kerber, fifth ranked Wozniacki and Venus Williams, before losing to Lucie Šafářová in the final. She then played in Indian Wells and Miami, losing in the third round at both.

Azarenka opened her clay season in Madrid, where she beat Venus Williams, but lost to her sister Serena in third round, despite having three match points. Next she reached the quarterfinals in Rome, losing to Maria Sharapova again after Sharapova previously beat her at Indian Wells. At the French Open, she lost eight games before reaching the third round, but then fell to Serena Williams, despite being two service games from victory in the second set.

She withdrew from the second round match in Birmingham citing a foot injury. Azarenka made a run to the Wimbledon quarterfinals with four straight set wins, but lost to Serena Williams again after taking the first set.

She returned to action in Toronto, reaching the third round after beating Elina Svitolina and third seed Petra Kvitová. She then seemed to be frustrated by Errani's medical timeout during the first set where she was up a break. Azarenka won just four of the next 14 games and lost the match.

Azarenka reached the third round of the Western & Southern Open in Cincinnati, beating Lauren Davis and fifth seed Caroline Wozniacki. She then retired against Anastasia Pavlyuchenkova.

She beat Lucie Hradecká, Yanina Wickmayer, 11th seed Angelique Kerber and Varvara Lepchenko to reach the quarterfinals at the US Open. She then lost in three sets to second seed Simona Halep.

=== 2016: Sunshine Double, top 5, tennis hiatus ===
Azarenka started her season at the Brisbane International in Australia. She reached the final after defeating Elena Vesnina, Ysaline Bonaventure, eighth seed Roberta Vinci and surprise qualifier Samantha Crawford. She faced fourth seed Angelique Kerber in the final and won the title without losing a set in the entire tournament. This was her 18th WTA title and her first since the 2013 Western & Southern Open. At the Australian Open, Azarenka was seeded 14th and reached the quarterfinals without dropping a set, including a double-bagel win over Alison Van Uytvanck. However, in her quarterfinal match she was defeated in straight sets by seventh seed and eventual champion Angelique Kerber, who had never defeated Azarenka in their previous six matches. Azarenka was ahead in the second set but failed to convert five set points.

Azarenka played her first 250-point International event since 2011 in Acapulco, Mexico. She withdrew after a first-round win over Polona Hercog. Azarenka next played, and won, at Indian Wells. The title included wins over Serena Williams, Karolína Plíšková, and a double-bagel win over Magdaléna Rybáriková. Her ranking rose to No. 8 after Indian Wells.

Two weeks later, Azarenka beat Svetlana Kuznetsova in the Miami final to become only the third player to win the Indian Wells-Miami double in the same year. The title included a straight-sets revenge defeat of Angelique Kerber in the semifinals and a win over Garbiñe Muguruza in the fourth round in their first meeting. Her ranking rose to No. 5 afterwards.

Azarenka started her clay-court season at the Madrid Open as the fourth seed. She cruised through the first two rounds with wins over Laura Robson and Alizé Cornet. However, she withdrew from her third-round match with Louisa Chirico citing a back injury.

After losing to Irina-Camelia Begu in her first match in Rome, she retired from her first-round match against Karin Knapp at the French Open, citing a knee injury. The same injury led her to withdraw from Wimbledon.

Azarenka announced her pregnancy through social media on 15 July, and missed the rest of the 2016 season as a result. On 20 December 2016, Azarenka gave birth to a boy named Leo; she subsequently split from his father and a custody battle ensued.

=== 2017: Return to tour, child custody battle ===
Azarenka returned to competitive tennis at the Mallorca Open (19–25 June), winning her first match against Risa Ozaki after saving three match points in the final set. She lost in the second round to Ana Konjuh.

At Wimbledon, Azarenka used her protected ranking to enter the main draw. She came back from a set down to defeat American teenager CiCi Bellis in the first round. In the second round, she completed the first straight sets win of her return by knocking out 15th seed Elena Vesnina. In the third round, Azarenka beat Heather Watson in a three-set match in 2 hours and 6 minutes. She was beaten by world No. 2, Simona Halep in the fourth round in straight sets. In mixed-doubles event, Azarenka teamed up with the former world No. 1 in men doubles, Nenad Zimonjic, where they lost in the first round of the championship to the 2016 Wimbledon mixed-doubles champion, Henri Kontinen and Heather Watson, in straight sets at the same day when Azarenka defeated Watson in the women's singles event.

In August 2017, Azarenka's custody battle for her eight-month old son resulted in her withdrawal from that year's US Open. She also missed the 2017 Fed Cup final, in which her native Belarus lost 2–3 to the United States.

=== 2018: Top 100, Wimbledon mixed-doubles final ===
Azarenka originally received a wild card for the Australian Open, but she withdrew from the tournament due to her ongoing custody battle. On 16 January 2018, it was announced that Azarenka had won her custody battle hearing, and was due to resume her career with the Indian Wells Open. She lost to Sloane Stephens in the third round. At the Miami Open, she set up a rematch against Stephens after defeating Karolína Plíšková in the quarterfinal round in straight sets. She lost in three sets. With her run to the semifinals, Azarenka returned to the top 100 for the first time since returning to tour. At the Madrid Open, Azarenka lost in round two to Karolína Plíšková. At the Italian Open, she was defeated in the opening round by Naomi Osaka. At the French Open, Azarenka was defeated in the first round by Kateřina Siniaková.

Azarenka started the grass-court season at the Mallorca Open, where she lost in the second round to Lucie Šafářová. At Wimbledon, she lost in the second round to another Czech player, Karolína Plíšková. Nonetheless, she reached the final in the mixed doubles, partnering Jamie Murray.

At the US Open, Azarenka lost in the third round in straight sets to defending champion Sloane Stephens. Then she played in the quarterfinals of Tokyo.

=== 2019: US Open doubles final, top 50 ===
At the Australian Open, Azarenka lost to Laura Siegemund in the first round.

She won doubles in Acapulco, partnering Zheng Saisai. In Monterrey, Azarenka advanced to the final, defeating Anastasia Pavlyuchenkova and Angelique Kerber along the way. She retired in the second set against defending champion Garbiñe Muguruza, citing a right leg injury, as she was losing 1–6, 1–3.

At Wimbledon, she lost in the third round to eventual champion Simona Halep. At the US Open, she made the final in women's doubles partnering Ashleigh Barty.

=== 2020: First title since 2016, major final, top 20 ===
Azarenka withdrew from the Australian Open due to 'personal problems'.

Her first match in 2020 was at the Monterrey Open, where she lost in the first round to Tamara Zidanšek in straight sets. She then withdrew from Indian Wells for undisclosed reasons, before the tournament was cancelled, and the WTA Tour was suspended, due to the COVID-19 pandemic.

When the WTA Tour resumed she played her first tournament in five months at the Top Seed Open in Lexington where she lost in the first round to Venus Williams in straight sets.

Azarenka next played at the Western & Southern Open, winning the title via walkover in the final, after Naomi Osaka withdrew citing a hamstring injury. This became her first WTA singles title since the 2016 Miami Open and since giving birth to her son. Following the victory, Azarenka climbed 22 places in the world rankings to 27th place.

Azarenka was unseeded in singles at the US Open, given that seedings were taken from the rankings the week prior to her big win. She defeated Barbara Haas in the first round, then defeated the fifth seed and world No. 11, her countrywoman Aryna Sabalenka in the second round. Azarenka then defeated Polish teenager Iga Świątek in the third round, before coming back from a set down to defeat the 20th seed Karolína Muchová, advancing to her first Grand Slam quarterfinal since the 2016 Australian Open. With Serena Williams and Tsvetana Pironkova also making the last eight, it marked the first time in Grand Slam history that three mothers advanced to the quarterfinals. She defeated Elise Mertens in the quarterfinals, and achieved her first ever Grand Slam victory over Serena Williams in three sets in the semifinals. She proceeded to a Grand Slam final for the first time since the 2013 US Open, where she lost to Osaka, despite leading by a set and a break. Despite the loss, Azarenka's ranking rose to No. 14, her highest ranking since January 2017.

In the clay-court swing, which started the following week at the Italian Open, she had victories over Venus Williams and reigning Australian Open champion Sofia Kenin. The win over Kenin was the tenth double bagel in Azarenka's career, and her first on clay since 2011. After a third-round win due to Daria Kasatkina's retirement, she was defeated by Garbiñe Muguruza in the quarterfinals. However, at a cold and grey Roland-Garros, Azarenka was defeated in straight sets by Anna Karolina Schmeidlova in the second round, having courted attention in the previous round for leaving the court mid-match after complaining to tournament staff about the playing conditions.

At the end of the season, Azarenka entered the Ostrava Open as the fourth seed in singles. She reached the finals, but was defeated by Sabalenka in straight sets, in a final in which she said she had struggled with a migraine.

=== 2021: Indian Wells final ===
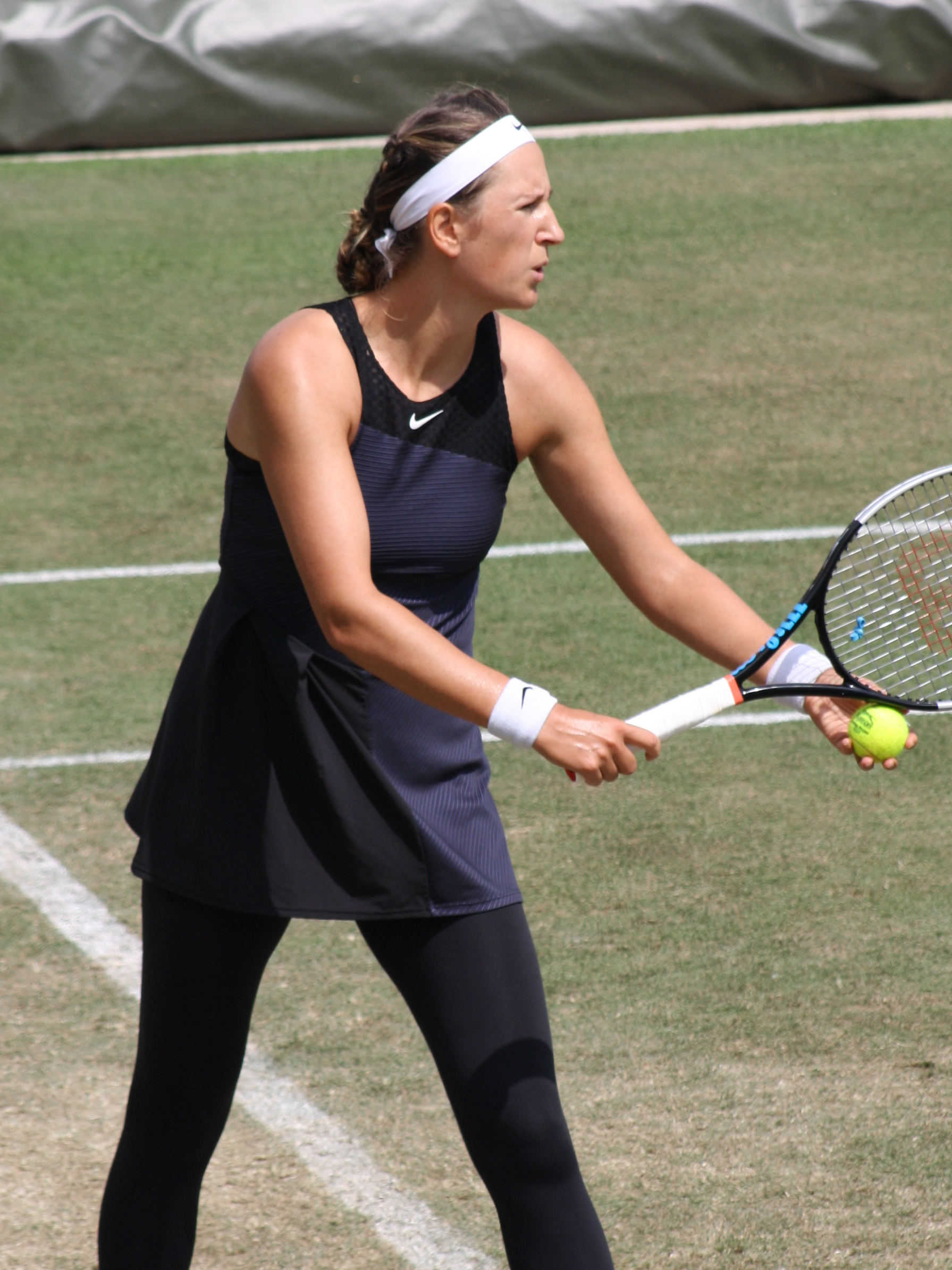
Azarenka in June 2021

In 2021, Azarenka first played at the Grampians Trophy, a tournament organised for players affected by the hard quarantine imposed upon those who travelled on flights that contained positive results for COVID-19. She defeated Yulia Putintseva in the second round. She withdrew prior to her match in the quarterfinals against Anett Kontaveit, citing a lower back injury.

Azarenka disappointed at the Australian Open, losing in the first round to the unseeded Jessica Pegula.

At Doha, Azarenka defeated Svetlana Kuznetsova and Laura Siegemund in straight sets, before facing Elina Svitolina in the quarterfinals. Azarenka was afflicted by a lower-back injury throughout the match. Despite this, Azarenka defeated Svitolina in straight sets. She withdrew before her match against eventual runner-up and world No. 16 Garbiñe Muguruza. She withdrew from Dubai, citing a back injury.

Her next tournament was the Miami Open. In receipt of a second round bye, she received a walkover from Laura Siegemund into the third round. In the third round, Azarenka recorded a straight sets victory over Angelique Kerber, before falling to world no. 1 and eventual champion Ashleigh Barty in the fourth round in three sets.

Azarenka started her clay season at Madrid, where she defeated Ekaterina Alexandrova. She then withdrew from her match against Jessica Pegula, citing a lower back injury.

At the French Open, she reached the fourth round only for the fifth time in her career, defeating Svetlana Kuznetsova, Clara Tauson, and Madison Keys, before falling to eventual runner-up Anastasia Pavlyuchenkova in three sets.

At the German Open, Azarenka reached the semifinals, defeating Andrea Petkovic, Angelique Kerber, and Jessica Pegula, before falling to the eventual champion, Liudmila Samsonova. Partnering compatriot Aryna Sabalenka, Azarenka won the doubles event at the same tournament, defeating the top seeded pair of Demi Schuurs and Nicole Melichar. At Bad Homburg, she defeated Yuliya Hatouka and Alizé Cornet, saving four match points in the process. She then withdrew from her match against Sara Sorribes Tormo, citing an abdominal injury.

At Wimbledon, she defeated Kateryna Kozlova in the first round, before falling to Sorana Cîrstea, despite having a 3–1 lead in the third set. At the 2021 National Bank Open in Canada she reached her first Masters WTA 1000 quarterfinal for the season. Seeded 18th at the US Open, Azarenka swept aside Tereza Martincová (6–4, 6–0), then squeaked past Jasmine Paolini (6–3, 7–6) before falling to ninth seed Garbiñe Muguruza in three sets.

At Indian Wells, she went one step further than in Canada, reaching the semifinals of the tournament for the fourth time in her career defeating again Jessica Pegula. In the semifinal she defeated Jeļena Ostapenko to reach her third Indian Wells final, which she lost to Paula Badosa. Only two women had won more matches in Indian Wells overall than her 33: Lindsay Davenport (47) and Maria Sharapova (38).

=== 2022: 500th tour-level win ===
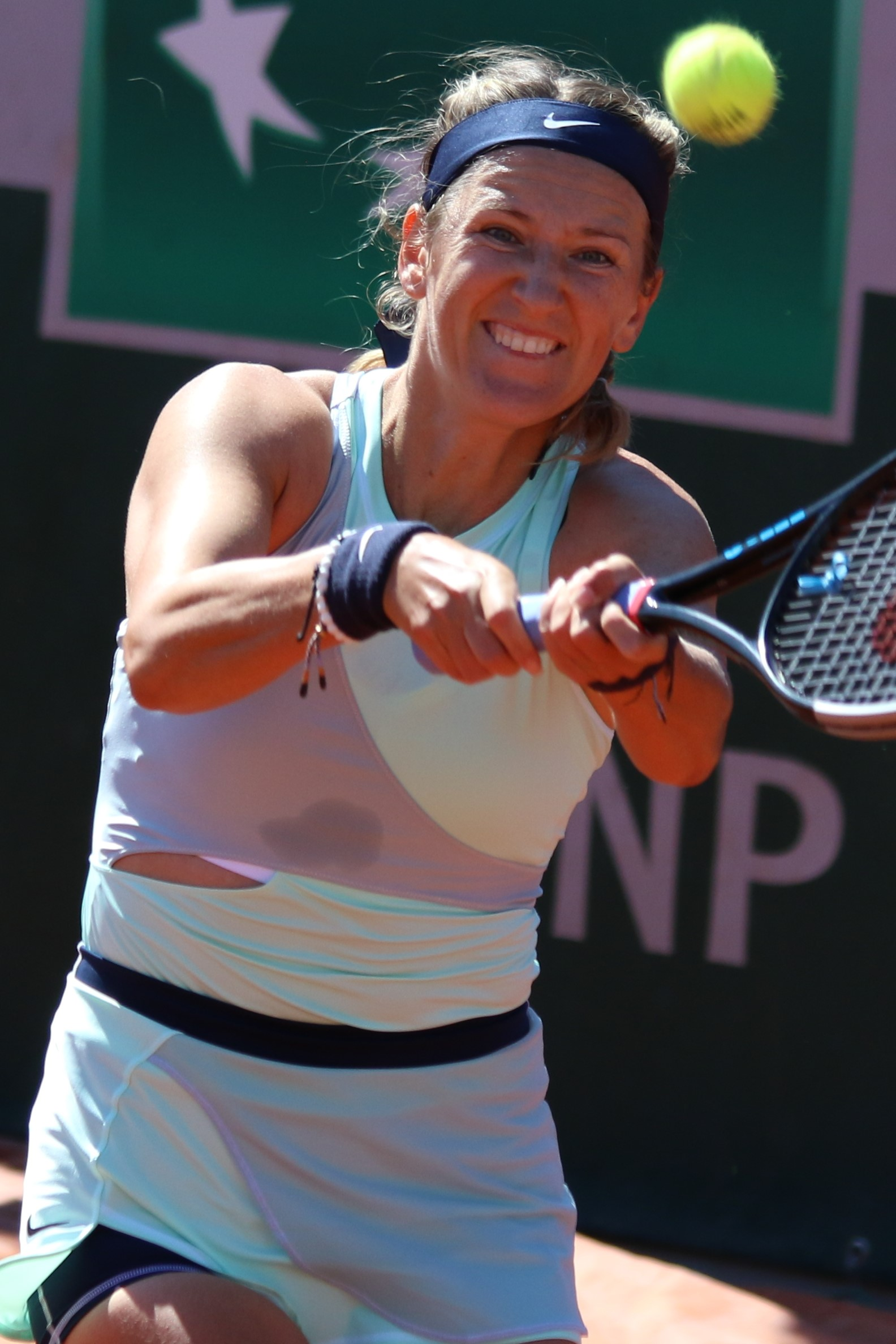
Azarenka at the 2022 French Open

Azarenka opened her season at the Adelaide International reaching the quarter-finals and losing to Swiatek in three sets. She reached semifinals in the doubles, partnering with Paula Badosa. However, she withdrew from the semis, citing a right thigh injury.

At the Australian Open Azarenka reached the fourth round which was her best result since 2016. At the WTA 1000 Qatar Open, she recorded her 500th tour-level match win defeating Yulia Putintseva in the first round. She withdrew from her second round match, citing a left hip injury.

In her next two tournaments at Indian Wells and Miami, she reached the third round. At Miami, she walked off the court while trailing 16-year-old Linda Fruhvirtová in the third round, despite the umpire asking her to wait for her trainer. She said later it was because her personal life was "extremely stressful". Former world No. 5 Daniela Hantuchova said:

"The most disrespectful thing about this is how she walked off the court without really giving a reason (for retiring). I think the WTA will really have to look into this. This one for me is really bizarre and really disrespectful to the crowd, to the umpire and most importantly to Linda (Fruhvirtova). I think Vika (Azarenka) just knows if she kept going this way she would be off the court anyway very shortly."

Six months later, former world No. 2 Radwanska said: "She has done theatre more than once before, she has faked injuries etc... I think: 'God, girl ... You're 33, you've got everything on the court, you're a mom. And you do something like that!' It is completely incomprehensible to me."

During the clay-court season, she reached the round of 16 while playing at the Madrid Open and at the Italian Open. At Roland Garros, Azarenka lost in the third round to Jil Teichmann in a three-set match lasting three hours. Azarenka decided not to play any grass-court tournaments due to Wimbledon's ban on Russian and Belarusan players. Azarenka started her North American hardcourt swing at the 2022 Citi Open. She reached the quarterfinals before falling to Wang Xiyu. She pulled out of the Canadian Open due to her travel visa getting declined. At the Cincinnati Open she fell in the second round to Emma Raducanu. At the US Open she reached the fourth round with wins over Kostyuk and Martic before falling to Karolina Pliskova in three sets. At the Guadalajara Open, she reached semifinals at the WTA 1000-level for the first time in the season, but lost to eventual champion Jessica Pegula, in straight sets.

=== 2023: Australian Open semifinal, WTA 1000 doubles title ===
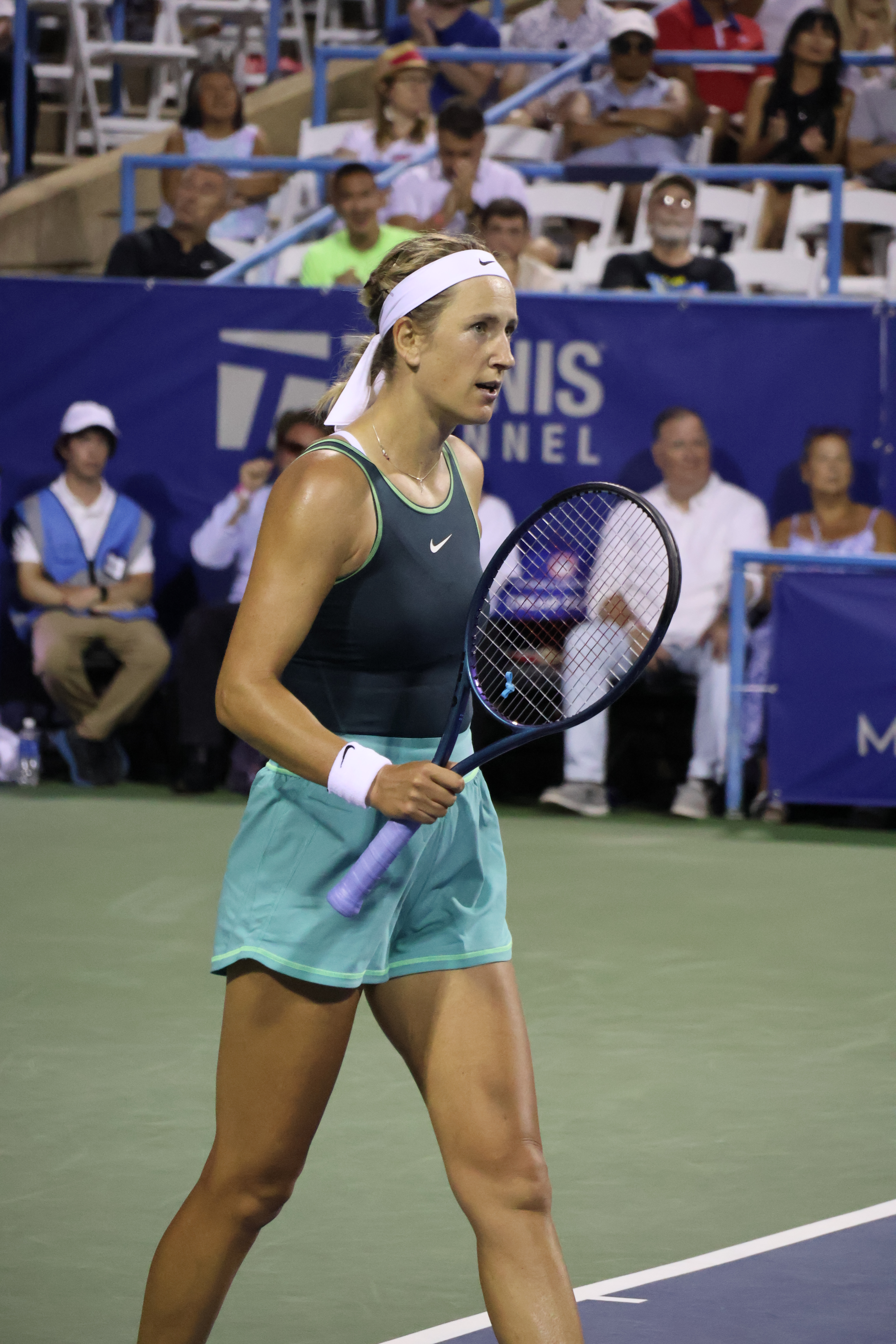
Victoria Azarenka at the 2023 DC Open

Seeded 24th, Azarenka returned to the semifinals of the 2023 Australian Open after 10 years. In the tournament she defeated Sofia Kenin, Nadia Podoroska, tenth seed Madison Keys, Zhu Lin and third seed Jessica Pegula. The points earned in the tournament moved her up to world No. 16. She lost to 22nd seed Elena Rybakina in straight sets.

She won her fifth WTA 1000 and tenth doubles title overall, at the Madrid Open with Beatriz Haddad Maia.

=== 2024–2025: Australian Open fourth round, 2025 season early end ===
Azarenka entered the 2024 Australian Open as 18th seed and defeated Camila Giorgi, Clara Tauson and 11th seed Jeļena Ostapenko to reach the fourth round where she lost to Dayana Yastremska.

Following a disappointing second round exit at Indian Wells, Azarenka fought back at the second half of the “Sunshine Double”, the WTA 1000 2024 Miami Open where she reached the semifinals. She defeated seventh seed Zheng Qinwen and 24th seed Katie Boulter in the third and fourth round, respectively. She then lost to Elena Rybakina, losing the final set tiebreak despite winning the second set 6–0.

== Playing style ==
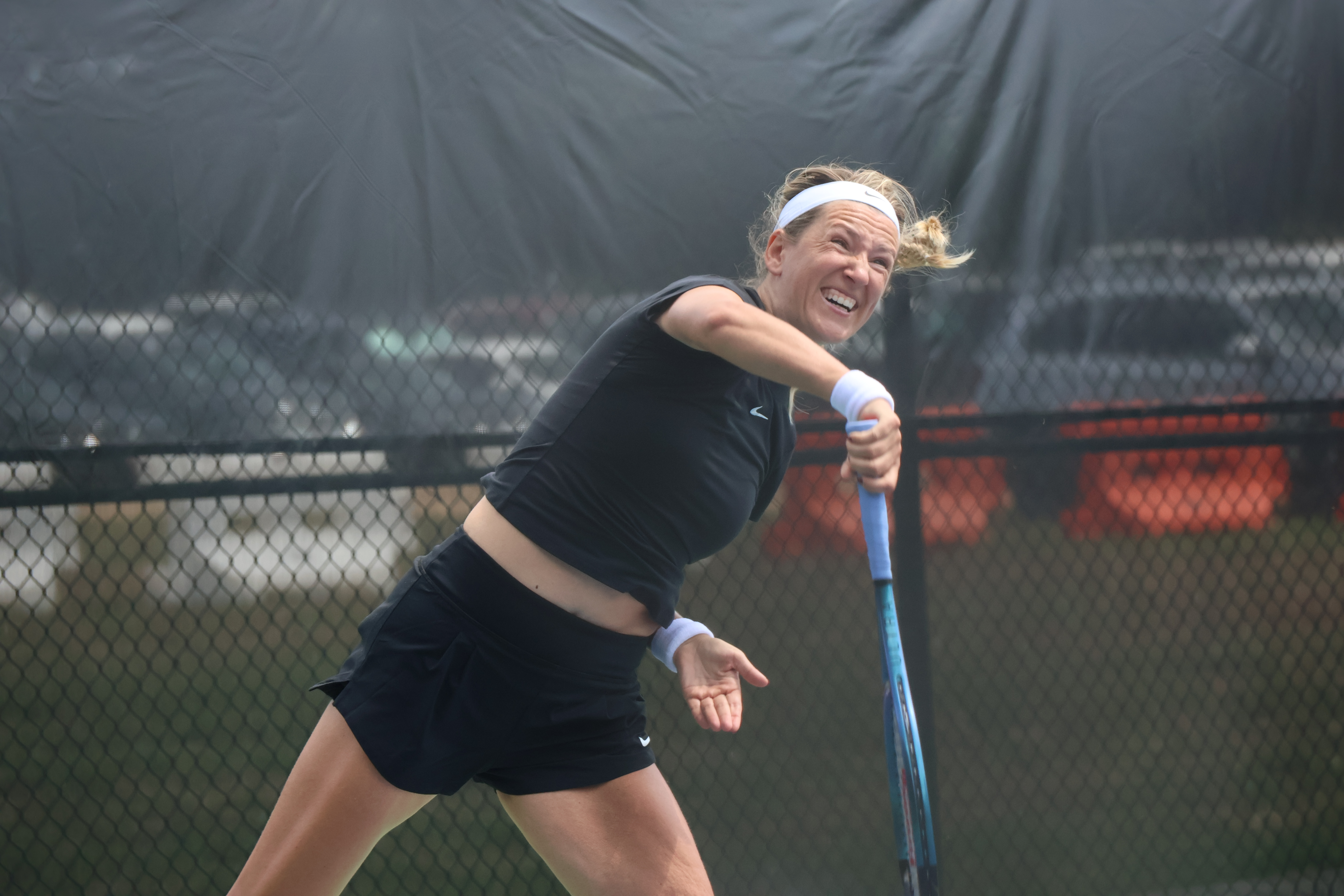
Victoria Azarenka at the 2024 DC Open

Azarenka is an aggressive baseliner, who is known for hitting the ball hard, flat, and early on the rise. Due to her playing style, she typically hits large numbers of winners in any match; despite this, she hits fewer unforced errors than similarly aggressive players, as her game is built around controlled aggression. Despite hitting her groundstrokes with relentless depth and power, Azarenka aims to move her opponents around the court, counterpunching until she can create the opportunity to hit a low-risk winner.

Azarenka's strongest groundstroke is her two-handed backhand, which she uses to dominate opponents on the court; she is widely considered to have one of the greatest backhands of all time. Her signature shot is her backhand down-the-line. Azarenka also possesses a strong forehand, with which she can rally effectively and hit winners, although her forehand is more vulnerable than her backhand; as such, players who are acquainted with her game target her forehand. Azarenka possesses a balanced first serve, which she improved considerably as her career progressed. Her serve speed peaked at 185 km/h (115 mph) at the 2024 Australian Open. Despite her strong first serve, her second serve is known for its volatility; when nervous, Azarenka typically commits a significant number of double faults. Her inconsistencies on serve are balanced by her return game, with her being described as one of the greatest return players in the history of the WTA Tour. She is known for her ability to neutralise powerful first serves, and punish short second serves.

Azarenka is known for her intensity, movement, speed, court coverage, footwork, and balance, allowing her to blend offence and defence effectively, and to execute her aggressive, yet controlled playing style effectively. Despite typically playing from the baseline, Azarenka is a capable net player due to her doubles experience, and she is adept at attacking the net when the opportunity arises. Azarenka is known for her mental strength and competitive spirit, and was described by Sloane Stephens as a "tough competitor". Azarenka prefers to play on hard courts, where the regular bounce and moderate pace suit her aggressive, yet measured, playing style. Azarenka is commonly regarded as a hard court specialist, due to the fact that all but one of her 21 singles titles have been won on hard courts. Due to her strong two-handed backhand, exceptional return game, mental strength, and preference for hard courts, she has been compared to Novak Djokovic.

== Endorsements and earnings ==
Azarenka is one of the most profitable stars in women's tennis. Azarenka is endorsed by Nike for clothing, footwear, and apparel, and is frequently featured in promotional material for the company. Red Bull entered into a deal with Azarenka in January 2013, making her the first tennis player sponsor for the beverage and sports investment giant. Throughout her career, Azarenka has been sponsored by numerous racquet companies: from the start of her junior career, up to 2012, she was sponsored by Head, and used the Head Extreme racquet. From 2012 to 2017, she was sponsored by Wilson, using the Wilson Ultra 100 racquet. Upon her return to tennis after pregnancy in 2017, Azarenka signed an endorsement deal with Yonex for racquets, using the EZONE 100 racquet. She switched back to the Wilson Ultra 100 in 2018, although she was not under contract with the company; after her successful 2020 season, she became endorsed by Wilson once again. Other endorsement partners include American Express, Citizen Watch, and Six Star Pro Nutrition; she was also endorsed by the investment company Instaforex from 2013 to 2016. Citizen Watch released an exclusive range of watches designed by Azarenka in 2014.

In August 2013, Azarenka was named the fourth highest paid female athlete in the world by Forbes magazine, with total earnings of $15.7 million from 2012 to 2013; her prize money constituted $6.7 million, whilst her growing endorsements equaled $9 million. Azarenka's $7.9 million prize money haul in 2012 was a single year record for a female athlete in any sport, and remains the sixth highest single year total earned in WTA history. With over $28.1 million in prize money, Azarenka is seventh on the list of all-time WTA prize money leaders.

== Coaching ==
Azarenka has had several coaches through the years. From 2005 to 2009, she was coached by António van Grichen, and she was coached by Sam Sumyk from 2010 to 2015, with whom she won her two Grand Slam titles, and reached No. 1 in the world; their partnership finished after an injury plagued 2014 season. She was coached by Wim Fissette from 2015 to 2016, until she became pregnant, and, upon her return from pregnancy in 2017, she was coached by Michael Joyce. In November 2018, Azarenka reunited with Fissette until December 2019, when he became Naomi Osaka's coach. In February 2020, Azarenka announced Dorian Descloix as her new coach, and has experienced renewed success with Descloix, returning to the upper echelon of women's tennis. Azarenka split from Descloix in October 2021, instead choosing to work with Maxime Tchoutakian.

== Rivalries ==
Throughout her career, Victoria Azarenka has established rivalries with other players on the WTA Tour. Her rivalries with Serena Williams and Maria Sharapova are among the most significant on the WTA Tour, as all three players have played each other at least 15 times.

=== Azarenka vs. Serena Williams ===
List of all matches

No.	Year	Tournament	Surface	Round	Winner	Score	V. A.	S. W.
1.	2008	Australian Open	Hard	R32	Williams	6–3, 6–4	0	1
2.	2009	Australian Open	Hard	R16	Williams	3–6, 4–2 ret.	0	2
3.	2009	Miami	Hard	F	Azarenka	6–3, 6–1	1	2
4.	2009	Wimbledon	Grass	QF	Williams	6–2, 6–3	1	3
5.	2010	Australian Open	Hard	QF	Williams	4–6, 7–6^{(7–4)}, 6–2	1	4
6.	2011	Toronto	Hard	SF	Williams	6–3, 6–3	1	5
7.	2011	US Open	Hard	R32	Williams	6–1, 7–6^{(7–5)}	1	6
8.	2012	Madrid	Clay (blue)	F	Williams	6–1, 6–3	1	7
9.	2012	Wimbledon	Grass	SF	Williams	6–3, 7–6^{(8–6)}	1	8
10.	2012	Summer Olympics	Grass	SF	Williams	6–1, 6–2	1	9
11.	2012	US Open	Hard	F	Williams	6–2, 2–6, 7–5	1	10
12.	2012	WTA Finals	Hard (i)	RR	Williams	6–4, 6–4	1	11
–	2013	Brisbane	Hard	SF	Williams	w/o	1	11
13.	2013	Doha	Hard	F	Azarenka	7–6^{(8–6)}, 2–6, 6–3	2	11
14.	2013	Rome	Clay	F	Williams	6–1, 6–3	2	12
15.	2013	Cincinnati	Hard	F	Azarenka	2–6, 6–2, 7–6^{(8–6)}	3	12
16.	2013	US Open	Hard	F	Williams	7–5, 6–7^{(6–8)}, 6–1	3	13
17.	2014	Brisbane	Hard	F	Williams	6–4, 7–5	3	14
18.	2015	Madrid	Clay	R16	Williams	7–6^{(7–5)}, 3–6, 7–6^{(7–1)}	3	15
19.	2015	French Open	Clay	R32	Williams	3–6, 6–4, 6–2	3	16
20.	2015	Wimbledon	Grass	QF	Williams	3–6, 6–2, 6–3	3	17
21.	2016	Indian Wells	Hard	F	Azarenka	6–4, 6–4	4	17
22.	2019	Indian Wells	Hard	R64	Williams	7–5, 6–3	4	18
23.	2020	US Open	Hard	SF	Azarenka	1–6, 6–3, 6–3	5	18

Azarenka's most notable rivalry is against Serena Williams. They have played 23 times, including 11 times in Grand Slams, with Serena Williams leading their head-to-head 18–5, 10–1 in Grand Slams, and 5–4 in finals. Their first meeting was at the 2008 Australian Open, with then-defending champion Williams winning in straight sets. Their next meeting would also be at the Australian Open, in the fourth round in 2009, and again Williams was victorious when the Belarusian was forced to retire due to illness, having won the first set but trailing 2–4 in the second. However, 2 1/2 months later, Azarenka would achieve her first victory in the rivalry, defeating the injured American in straight sets in the final of the Sony Ericsson Open. Williams later won a quarterfinal match between the pair at Wimbledon on her way to winning this championship.

The two played in the 2010 quarterfinals. Azarenka had won the first set and was leading in the second set before Williams won the three-set match, and she won the title for the second consecutive year. Her dominance continued with straight-sets victories at the Rogers Cup and the US Open in 2011, both times coming after Williams' ranking had plummeted to world No. 175 following Wimbledon.

The rivalry reached its peak in 2012 with the pair meeting five times, with Serena Williams victorious on each occasion: the Madrid Masters final, the Wimbledon semifinals, the Olympics semifinals, the US Open final, described by many as the best match of the year on WTA, and in the round-robin stage of the year-end championships. They had been due to meet in the semifinals of the 2013 Brisbane International, before Azarenka was forced to withdraw due to a toe infection. At the Qatar Total Open, Azarenka scored just her second victory over Williams in a WTA Tour match, winning in the championship match in three sets. They next faced off on clay at 2013 Internazionali BNL d'Italia which Williams won in straight sets.

Azarenka's third victory over Williams came in the final of the Western and Southern Open; again, a third set was required to decide the outcome, and on this occasion a final-set tiebreak proved to be the difference. However, in a rematch of the previous year's final, Williams got her revenge, defeating Azarenka in the final of the US Open, which, like the previous year, also required a third set. Azarenka then lost to Williams again in the championship match of the Brisbane International early in 2014; this defeat marked Azarenka's first at the tournament.

The pair did not play again until the 2015 Madrid Open some 16 months later; Azarenka lost a third round match against Williams in three sets despite holding three match points on her own serve in the final set. They then played in the third round of the 2015 French Open where Azarenka led by a set and a break before going on to lose 10 of the next 12 games. In the quarterfinals of the 2015 Wimbledon Championships, she once again was one set up on Williams, but proceeded to lose the match in three sets.

For their 21st meeting, they faced off in the final of the 2016 Indian Wells Open. Victoria earned her fourth win, becoming the first player to defeat Serena four times in a final. This was followed by another meeting in the second round of Indian Wells in 2019, which Serena won in two very tight sets.

In 2020, a resurgent Azarenka recorded her first victory against Williams in a Grand Slam, winning in three sets in the US Open semifinal.

Despite the lopsided record (18–5 in Williams' favor), many have said that Azarenka is the only player with the ability to consistently challenge Serena.

=== Azarenka vs. Bartoli ===
Azarenka and Marion Bartoli played 12 times from 2007 to 2012. Azarenka led the head-to-head 9–3 overall and 1–0 in the Grand Slams.

Azarenka dominated the early rivalry, winning the first six meetings between the pair, including in the second round of the 2007 Australian Open, the final of the 2009 Brisbane International and all four matches that eventuated in 2010. The win in Brisbane marked Azarenka's first success in a WTA Tour final, having previously lost three finals. Bartoli got her first win over Azarenka in Eastbourne in 2011, winning after Azarenka retired with injury. At the 2011 WTA Tour Championships, Bartoli qualified as a reserve for Maria Sharapova and in the only match she played, she upset Azarenka in three sets. The match had no meaning because Bartoli could not qualify for the semi-finals as Sharapova had lost her two matches and Azarenka had already qualified for the semi-finals.

The pair played three times in 2012, with Azarenka winning two of the matches. Bartoli's victory in the Miami quarterfinals was significant though, as it snapped Azarenka's 26-match winning streak to start the season. Bartoli won in straight sets to record what was at the time her third victory over a reigning world No. 1. Their last meeting was in the semi-finals of the China Open with Azarenka avenging the Miami loss on her way to winning the title.

=== Azarenka vs. Sharapova ===
List of all matches

No.	Year	Tournament	Surface	Round	Winner	Score	Length	V. A.	M. S.
1.	2007	Moscow	Carpet	R16	Azarenka	7–6^{(11–9)}, 6–2	1:49	1	0
2.	2009	Los Angeles	Hard	R32	Sharapova	6–7^{(4–7)}, 6–4, 6–2	2:32	1	1
3.	2009	Beijing	Hard	R32	Sharapova	6–3, 6–7^{(5–7)}, 7–5	2:56	1	2
4.	2010	Stanford	Hard	F	Azarenka	6–4, 6–1	1:27	2	2
5.	2011	Miami	Hard	F	Azarenka	6–1, 6–4	1:46	3	2
6.	2011	Rome	Clay	QF	Sharapova	4–6, 3–0 RET	1:23	3	3
7.	2012	Australian Open	Hard	F	Azarenka	6–3, 6–0	1:22	4	3
8.	2012	Indian Wells	Hard	F	Azarenka	6–2, 6–3	1:26	5	3
9.	2012	Stuttgart	Clay	F	Sharapova	6–1, 6–4	1:24	5	4
10.	2012	US Open	Hard	SF	Azarenka	3–6, 6–2, 6–4	2:42	6	4
11.	2012	Beijing	Hard	F	Azarenka	6–3, 6–1	1:27	7	4
12.	2012	Istanbul	Hard	SF	Sharapova	6–4, 6–2	1:36	7	5
13.	2013	French Open	Clay	SF	Sharapova	6–1, 2–6, 6–4	2:10	7	6
14.	2015	Indian Wells	Hard	R32	Sharapova	6–4, 6–3	1:52	7	7
15.	2015	Rome	Clay	QF	Sharapova	6–3, 6–2	1:32	7	8

One of women's tennis most prominent rivalries during the 2010s was the one between Azarenka and Maria Sharapova. They played 15 times from 2007 to 2015. The head-to-head finished at 7–8 overall in Sharapova's favor, but Azarenka led 2–1 in the Grand Slams and 5–1 in finals. They ranked as the top two women in the world from January 2012 to January 2013 except for a brief period in July and August when Agnieszka Radwańska was the world No. 2 behind Azarenka.

Azarenka won their first meeting in 2007, in the second round of the Kremlin Cup in Moscow. Their first meeting in a WTA Tour final came at the 2010 Bank of the West Classic in Stanford, which Azarenka won for her first (and fourth career) title that year. Azarenka also defeated Sharapova in the Miami Masters final in 2011 to win her second title at that tournament.

The rivalry between the two players started to intensify in 2012, with six meetings between the pair that year, four of them being in finals. Azarenka won four of the six meetings that year, three of them in finals. Their most famous meeting occurred early that year, in the final of the 2012 Australian Open. This match had historical proportions as Azarenka would become the first player from her country to either win a Grand Slam singles title or become world No. 1, or Sharapova would win her second title at the tournament, having won in 2008. Ultimately, Azarenka won the match, beating Sharapova in straight sets in one hour and twenty-two minutes and in doing so claimed the world No. 1 ranking for the first time. Azarenka would defeat Sharapova in two further finals, at Indian Wells, in Beijing however Sharapova would prevail in the final of the 2012 Porsche Tennis Grand Prix. Their two non-finals were split, Azarenka winning at the US Open and Sharapova winning at the year-end championships.

The pair's only meeting in 2013 did not come until the semifinals of the French Open, where Sharapova won in three sets. This marked the first time Sharapova had beaten Azarenka at a Grand Slam, and improved to 3–0 against her on clay. Sharapova won their next meeting in the third round of the 2015 BNP Paribas Open in straight sets.

=== Azarenka vs. Li ===
List of all matches

No.	Year	Tournament	Surface	Round	Winner	Score	Length	V.A.	L.N.
1.	2008	Gold Coast	Hard	F	Li	4–6, 6–3, 6–4	N/A	0	1
2.	2009	Tokyo	Hard	QF	Li	7–6^{(9–7)}, 4–6, 7–6^{(7–4)}	N/A	0	2
3.	2010	Montreal	Hard	R16	Azarenka	6–3, 6–3	1:24	1	2
4.	2011	Australian Open	Hard	R16	Li	6–3, 6–3	N/A	1	3
5.	2011	French Open	Clay	QF	Li	7–5, 6–2	N/A	1	4
6.	2011	Istanbul	Hard	RR	Azarenka	6–2, 6–2	N/A	2	4
7.	2012	Sydney	Hard	F	Azarenka	6–2, 1–6, 6–3	1:56	3	4
8.	2012	Madrid	Clay	QF	Azarenka	3–6, 6–3, 6–3	1:54	4	4
9.	2012	Istanbul	Hard	RR	Azarenka	7–6^{(7–4)}, 6–3	N/A	5	4
10.	2013	Australian Open	Hard	F	Azarenka	4–6, 6–4, 6–3	2:40	6	4
11.	2013	Istanbul	Hard	RR	Li	6–2, 6–1	N/A	6	5

Azarenka and Li Na played 11 times from 2008 to 2013. Azarenka led the head-to-head 6–5 overall, and 2–1 in championship matches (all of which reached a deciding set), but trailed 1–2 in Grand Slam matches.

Their first meeting was in the final of the 2008 Mondial Australian Women's Hardcourts tournament (which has since been renamed as the Brisbane International), which Li Na won in three sets after Azarenka had won the first. Azarenka's first victory over Li was in the third round of the 2010 Rogers Cup. They played three times in 2011, two of which were at the Majors, with Li winning both times. Azarenka won their third meeting at the 2011 WTA Tour Championships en route to reaching the final.

They played three times in 2012, with Azarenka winning each time. They played in the final of the Sydney International, where Azarenka won in three sets after breaking the defending champion Li at 4–3 in the decider. Azarenka was also victorious in their meetings at Madrid and the year-end championships.

Their most notable meeting to date was in the final of the 2013 Australian Open. Both players entered the championship match with one Grand Slam title each (Azarenka won the 2012 Australian Open, whilst Li won the 2011 French Open), and in very good form, with Azarenka only dropping one set throughout her run and Li Na having not dropped a set and also having defeated two top four players (Agnieszka Radwańska and Maria Sharapova) en route. After Li Na won the first set, Azarenka stepped up her game as Li started to suffer multiple injuries, and eventually won in three sets to successfully defend her Australian Open title and become the first world No. 1 to win a Major since Serena Williams won Wimbledon in 2010.

Azarenka lost the pair's last meeting in straight sets at the 2013 WTA Tour Championships, playing through a back injury and winning just three games in the process.

== Personal life ==
In 2012, Azarenka became registered in Monaco, but in August 2013, she purchased a large ocean-overlooking house in Manhattan Beach, California as her principal residence. Azarenka dated American musician Redfoo from late 2012 to early 2014. Azarenka has spoken about her experience of depression during her injury-induced absence from professional tennis in 2014.

=== Custody battle ===
Azarenka and former boyfriend Billy McKeague have one son, Leonard born in 2016. Immediately after 2017 Wimbledon, they split and became involved in a custody battle for their son. Azarenka then withdrew from the remaining 2017 tournaments. In January 2018, Azarenka won an early round of the U.S. custody proceedings when a Los Angeles County Superior Court judge ruled that the custody case of their U.S.-born son should not take place in Los Angeles, but in Belarus. In April 2018, Azarenka returned to the tour, competing in Europe. In December 2018, the California Courts of Appeal ruled that the LA County Superior Court had jurisdiction over the case, overturning the initial LA County Superior Court Belarus-jurisdiction decision.

=== Ukraine invasion ===
In March 2022, Azarenka released a statement on Twitter to state her heartbreak concerning the "actions that have taken place" (the 2022 Russian invasion of Ukraine, aided by her native Belarus), and "declare[d] her dismay and great sadness at the events" in Ukraine, saying: "I have always seen … Ukrainian and Belarusian people [and] nations … friendly and supportive of one another. It is hard to witness the violent separation that is currently taking place instead of supporting and finding compassion for each other."

== Career statistics ==
=== Grand Slam performance timelines ===
Key
W	F	SF	QF	#R	RR	Q#	DNQ	A	NH

(W) winner; (F) finalist; (SF) semifinalist; (QF) quarterfinalist; (#R) rounds 4, 3, 2, 1; (RR) round-robin stage; (Q#) qualification round; (DNQ) did not qualify; (A) absent; (NH) not held; (SR) strike rate (events won / competed); (W–L) win–loss record.
To avoid confusion and double counting, these charts are updated at the conclusion of a tournament or when the player's participation has ended.

==== Singles ====
Tournament	2006	2007	2008	2009	2010	2011	2012	2013	2014	2015	2016	2017	2018	2019	2020	2021	2022	2023	2024	2025	SR	W–L	Win%
Australian Open	1R	3R	3R	4R	QF	4R	W	W	QF	4R	QF	A	A	1R	A	1R	4R	SF	4R	1R	2 / 17	50–15	77%
French Open	1R	1R	4R	QF	1R	QF	4R	SF	A	3R	1R	A	1R	2R	2R	4R	3R	1R	2R	2R	0 / 18	30–18	63%
Wimbledon	1R	3R	3R	QF	3R	SF	SF	2R	2R	QF	A	4R	2R	3R	NH	2R	A (Note: Russian and Belarusian athletes were banned from competing following the 2022 Russian invasion of Ukraine.)	4R	A	1R	0 / 16	36–16	69%
US Open	3R	4R	3R	3R	2R	3R	F	F	QF	QF	A	A	3R	1R	F	3R	4R	2R	3R	3R	0 / 18	50–18	74%
Win–loss	2–4	7–4	9–4	13–4	7–4	14–4	21–3	19–2	9–3	13–4	4–2	3–1	3–3	3–4	7–2	6–4	8–3	9–4	6–3	3–4	2 / 69	166–66	72%

==== Doubles ====
Tournament	2007	2008	2009	2010	2011	...	2018	2019	2020	2021	2022	2023	W–L
Australian Open	A	F	3R	3R	F		A	2R	A	A	A	A	15–3
French Open	1R	QF	F	2R	QF		A	3R	A	A	A	2R	15–7
Wimbledon	2R	QF	3R	1R	A		A	3R	NH	A	A	2R	8–3
US Open	1R	1R	2R	A	A		2R	F	2R	A	A	QF	10–7
Win–loss	1–3	11–4	9–2	3–3	8–2		1–1	10–2	1–1	0–0	0–0	4–2	48–20

==== Mixed doubles ====
Tournament	2006	2007	2008	...	2012	...	2017	2018	...	2021	SR	W–L	Win%
Australian Open	A	F	1R		A		A	A		A	0 / 2	4–2	67%
French Open	A	1R	W		A		A	A		A	1 / 2	5–1	83%
Wimbledon	A	1R	A		3R		1R	F		A	0 / 4	7–4	64%
US Open	2R	W	A		A		A	A		A	1 / 2	6–1	86%
Win–loss	1–1	9–3	5–1		2–1		0–1	5–1		0–0	2 / 10	22–8	73%

=== Grand Slam finals ===
==== Singles: 5 (2 titles, 3 runner-ups) ====
Result	Year	Championship	Surface	Opponent	Score
Win	2012	Australian Open	Hard	(Russia) Maria Sharapova	6–3, 6–0
Loss	2012	US Open	Hard	(United States) Serena Williams	2–6, 6–2, 5–7
Win	2013	Australian Open (2)	Hard	(China) Li Na	4–6, 6–4, 6–3
Loss	2013	US Open (2)	Hard	(United States) Serena Williams	5–7, 7–6^{(8–6)}, 1–6
Loss	2020	US Open (3)	Hard	(Japan) Naomi Osaka	6–1, 3–6, 3–6

==== Doubles: 4 (4 runner-ups) ====
Result	Year	Championship	Surface	Partner	Opponents	Score
Loss	2008	Australian Open	Hard	(Israel) Shahar Pe'er	(Ukraine) Alona Bondarenko (Ukraine) Kateryna Bondarenko	6–2, 1–6, 4–6
Loss	2009	French Open	Clay	(Russia) Elena Vesnina	(Spain) Anabel Medina Garrigues (Spain) Virginia Ruano Pascual	1–6, 1–6
Loss	2011	Australian Open	Hard	(Russia) Maria Kirilenko	(Argentina) Gisela Dulko (Italy) Flavia Pennetta	6–2, 5–7, 1–6
Loss	2019	US Open	Hard	(Australia) Ashleigh Barty	(Belgium) Elise Mertens (Belarus) Aryna Sabalenka	5–7, 5–7

==== Mixed doubles: 4 (2 titles, 2 runner-ups) ====
Result	Year	Championship	Surface	Partner	Opponents	Score
Loss	2007	Australian Open	Hard	(Belarus) Max Mirnyi	(Russia) Elena Likhovtseva (Canada) Daniel Nestor	4–6, 4–6
Win	2007	US Open	Hard	(Belarus) Max Mirnyi	(United States) Meghann Shaughnessy (India) Leander Paes	6–4, 7–6^{(8–6)}
Win	2008	French Open	Clay	(United States) Bob Bryan	(Slovenia) Katarina Srebotnik (Serbia) Nenad Zimonjić	6–2, 7–6^{(7–4)}
Loss	2018	Wimbledon	Grass	(United Kingdom) Jamie Murray	(United States) Nicole Melichar (Austria) Alexander Peya	6–7^{(1–7)}, 3–6

== See also ==
- WTA Tour records
- List of WTA number 1 ranked singles tennis players
- List of female tennis players
- List of tennis rivalries
- Open Era tennis records – women's singles
- All-time tennis records – women's singles

== Notes ==
Sporting positions
Preceded by Caroline Wozniacki; Maria Sharapova	World No. 1; 30 January 2012 – 10 June 2012; 9 July 2012 – 17 February 2013	Succeeded by Maria Sharapova; Serena Williams
Awards
Preceded by Michaëlla Krajicek	ITF Junior World Champion; 2005	Succeeded by Anastasia Pavlyuchenkova
Preceded by Serena Williams & Venus Williams	WTA Fan Favorite Doubles Team of the Year (with Maria Kirilenko); 2011	Succeeded by Serena Williams & Venus Williams
Preceded by Caroline Wozniacki	Diamond Aces; 2012, 2013	Succeeded by Petra Kvitová
