= Wim Fissette =

Belgian tennis coach

- Country (sports): Belgium
- Born: 22 March 1980 (age 46) Sint-Truiden
- Official website: http://www.wimfissette.com

Coaching career (2009–)
- Kim Clijsters (2009–2011); Sabine Lisicki (2013); Simona Halep (2014); Victoria Azarenka (2015–2016); Petra Kvitová (2016); Sara Errani (2016); Johanna Konta (2016–2017); Angelique Kerber (2017–2018); Victoria Azarenka (2018–2020); Naomi Osaka (2020–2022); Zheng Qinwen (2023); Naomi Osaka (2023–2024); Iga Świątek (2024–2026); Victoria Mboko (2026–Present)

Coaching achievements
- List of notable tournaments (with champion) 2x US Open (Clijsters); 2010 WTA Tour Championships (Clijsters); 2011 Australian Open (Clijsters); 2013 Wimbledon runner-up (Lisicki); 2014 French Open runner-up (Halep); 2018 Wimbledon Championships (Kerber); 2020 US Open (Osaka); 2021 Australian Open (Osaka); 2025 Wimbledon (Świątek)
- Last updated on: 12 September 2020.

Wim Fissette (born 22 March 1980) is a Belgian tennis coach and former professional player. He has coached and worked with former Women's Tennis Association (WTA) world number ones Victoria Azarenka, Kim Clijsters, Simona Halep, Angelique Kerber, Naomi Osaka and Iga Świątek. Since 2023, he has been the captain of the Belgium Billie Jean King Cup team.

== Playing career ==
Fissette reached a career high singles ranking of 1,291 on 23 August 1999.

== Coaching career ==
Fissette first took on the role of Kim Clijsters' coach upon the Belgian making a comeback onto the WTA Tour in 2009, having served as her hitting partner before her first retirement in 2007. Under his stewardship, Clijsters won the US Open that year as a wildcard entry, and successfully retained the title twelve months later. She also won the 2010 WTA Tour Championships, followed shortly after by the Australian Open early the following year. She also reigned as the world number one for a solitary week in 2011. Fissette and Clijsters split in September that year.

After splitting from Clijsters, Fissette became the coach of Sabine Lisicki shortly before the 2013 French Open. Although Lisicki was unable to win any titles under Fissette's leadership, she reached the final at Wimbledon, losing to Marion Bartoli in straight sets after ending Serena Williams' 34-match winning streak and preventing her from equaling elder sister Venus' 35-match winning streak set in 2000 en route.

In 2014, Fissette became the coach of Simona Halep. Their partnership brought about improved results for Halep, who that year reached her first Grand Slam quarterfinal at the Australian Open, the final of the French Open and then the semi-finals at Wimbledon. She also reached a career high ranking of world number two in August that year. The pair split at the end of the year, with Halep wanting to focus on working with coaches from her native Romania.

In February 2015, Fissette became the coach of former world number one Victoria Azarenka, whose previous coach Sam Sumyk defected to coach Eugenie Bouchard (and later Garbiñe Muguruza). At the time of this appointment, Azarenka was ranked 50th in the world, her lowest ranking since June 2007. Fissette remained with Azarenka until she announced her pregnancy in mid-2016.

From the start of 2017 Fissette became the coach of Johanna Konta. During his time coaching her, she had a successful start to the year, winning the Sydney International and the Miami Open and getting to the quarterfinals of the Australian Open. The pair also had a successful grass court season, with Konta becoming the first British woman since Virginia Wade in 1978 to reach the semifinals of Wimbledon. She reached a career high ranking of number 4 in the world with Fissette's help. However, it was announced on 18 October 2017 that Fisette and Johanna had mutually decided to split, following her string of bad results during the Asian tennis swing.

Fissette began working with two-time Grand Slam champion and former world number one Angelique Kerber in 2018 after the German struggled throughout 2017 and fell out of the top-20. Kerber was the third Major champion Fissette worked with in his coaching career. They split in October 2018 following differences of opinion with regard to Kerber's future direction. With Fisette, the 30-year-old Kerber, who reached No. 1 in the rankings in 2016 but now sat third, reached the semifinals of the Australian Open before going on to win Wimbledon.

On 5 January 2020, The Japan Times published an article in which he was named as the coach of Naomi Osaka, the Australian Open Women's Champion in 2019.

In the summer of 2023, Tennis World reported that he was the coach of Qinwen Zheng. In September 2023, according to Zheng, Fissette "broke the[ir] contract" and rejoined Osaka's team.

On 14 September 2024, Naomi Osaka announced that she had parted ways with Fissette. On 17 October 2024, Iga Świątek announced that Fissette would be her new coach. While their partnership was successful, with the Wimbledon singles title in 2025 being the highlight, Swiatek only managed to win two other WTA titles in 2025, and failed to advance past the QF stage of tournaments in early 2026. In an Instagram post on 23rd March 2026, days after her streak of 73 consecutive opening round wins ended at the Miami Open, Swiatek announced she and Fissette have parted ways.

=== Coaching Grand Slam performance timeline ===
Key
W	F	SF	QF	#R	RR	Q#	DNQ	A	NH

(W) winner; (F) finalist; (SF) semifinalist; (QF) quarterfinalist; (#R) rounds 4, 3, 2, 1; (RR) round-robin stage; (Q#) qualification round; (DNQ) did not qualify; (A) absent; (NH) not held; (SR) strike rate (events won / competed); (W–L) win–loss record.

Tournament	2009	2010	2011	2012	2013	2014	2015	2016	2017	2018	2020	2021	2022	2023	2024	2025	2026	SR
Grand Slam tournaments
Australian Open	A	3R	W	A	A	QF	A	QF	QF	SF	3R	W	3R	A	1R	SF	QF	2 / 12
French Open	A	A	2R	A	3R	F	3R	1R	1R	QF	A	2R	1R	A	2R	SF		0 / 11
Wimbledon	A	QF	A	A	F	SF	QF	2R	SF	W	NH	A	A	1R	2R	W		2 / 10
US Open	W	W	A	A	3R	3R	QF	4R	1R	3R	W	3R	1R	QF	2R	QF		3 / 14

Sporting positions
Preceded by unknown	Coach of Kim Clijsters; 2009–2011	Succeeded by Carl Maes
Preceded by Adrian Marcu	Coach of Simona Halep; 2014	Succeeded by Victor Ioniță
Preceded by Sam Sumyk	Coach of Victoria Azarenka; 2015–2016	Succeeded by Michael Joyce
Preceded by Esteban Carril and Jose-Manuel Garcia	Coach of Johanna Konta; 2017	Succeeded by Michael Joyce
