= Sam Sumyk =

French tennis coach (born 1967)

- Country (sports): France
- Born: 1967 (age 58–59)

Coaching career (2007–)
- Vera Zvonareva (2007–2009); Victoria Azarenka (2010–2015); Eugenie Bouchard (2015); Garbiñe Muguruza (2015–2019); Anastasia Pavlyuchenkova (2019–2020); Donna Vekic (2020–2021); Harmony Tan (2021–2022); Arthur Cazaux (2024–)

Coaching achievements
- List of notable tournaments (with champion) 2x Australian Open (Azarenka); World number one ranking (Azarenka); 2012 Olympic singles bronze medal (Azarenka); 2012 Olympic mixed doubles gold medal (Azarenka); 2x US Open runner-up (Azarenka); 2016 French Open (Muguruza); 2017 Wimbledon (Muguruza); World number one ranking (Muguruza)
- Last updated on: 1 October 2024.

Sam Sumyk (born 1967) is a French tennis coach.

He is currently coaching Arthur Cazaux.

He has previously worked with former world number one players Victoria Azarenka and Garbiñe Muguruza, former world number two Vera Zvonareva and 2014 Wimbledon finalist Eugenie Bouchard.

He also coached Anastasia Pavlyuchenkova for six months and then Donna Vekic from September 2020 until late 2021.

== Personal life ==
Sumyk is married to former WTA player Meilen Tu, whom he coached to her highest career ranking of 35 in 2007.

== Coaching career ==
Before 2010, Sumyk coached Russian Vera Zvonareva. After the pair split in 2009, Sumyk became the coach of Victoria Azarenka.

The partnership between Sumyk and Azarenka was successful. In his third year of coaching Azarenka, the Belarusian won her first Grand Slam title at the 2012 Australian Open and reigned as the world number one for 51 of the 55 weeks that followed, during which she successfully defended her Australian Open title in 2013. Sumyk split from Azarenka shortly after the 2015 Australian Open after the Belarusian endured an injury-plagued 2014.

Sumyk then coached former world number five Eugenie Bouchard from February until August 2015. He then coached Garbiñe Muguruza; under his stewardship, Muguruza won her first Grand Slam singles title at the 2016 French Open and her second at the 2017 Wimbledon Championships. Sumyk was not present in that tournament because his wife Meilen Tu was pregnant at the time. Sumyk continued to coach Muguruza until the pair split at the 2019 Wimbledon Championships.

He then started coaching Anastasia Pavlyuchenkova until late March 2020 when they split after six months. According to an interview with the website Kommersant, she attributed a recent hip injury to Sumyk's training and tournament scheduling. She also discussed that any coaches have large egos and that she realized at the Australian Open that the relationship with Sumyk was not conducive to making improvements on court.

Sporting positions
Preceded by António van Grichen	Coach of Victoria Azarenka; 2010–2015	Succeeded by Wim Fissette
Preceded by Nick Saviano	Coach of Eugenie Bouchard; 2015	Succeeded by Thomas Högstedt
Preceded by Alejo Mancisidor	Coach of Garbiñe Muguruza; 2015	Succeeded by present
