= 2001 Estoril Open – Men's singles =

Men's singles
- 2001 Estoril Open

Final
- Champion: (Spain) Juan Carlos Ferrero
- Runner-up: (Spain) Félix Mantilla
- Score: 7–6^{(7–3)}, 4–6, 6–3

Details
- Draw: 32
- Seeds: 8

Events
| Singles | men | women |
| Doubles | men | women |
- Estoril Open

This tournament took place between April 9 and 15, 2001.

Carlos Moyá was the defending champion but did not compete that year.

Juan Carlos Ferrero won in the final 7–6^{(7–3)}, 4–6, 6–3 against Félix Mantilla.

== Seeds ==
1. (Spain) Juan Carlos Ferrero (champion)
2. (United Kingdom) Tim Henman (second round)
3. (Slovakia) Dominik Hrbatý (quarterfinals)
4. (Argentina) Franco Squillari (quarterfinals)
5. (Romania) Andrei Pavel (semifinals)
6. (United States) Michael Chang (first round)
7. (Ecuador) Nicolás Lapentti (first round)
8. (Spain) Albert Costa (first round)

== Draw ==
Key

- Q = Qualifier
- WC = Wild card
- LL = Lucky loser
- Alt = Alternate
- ITF = ITF entry
- PR = Protected ranking
- SR = Special ranking
- SE = Special exempt
- JE = Junior exempt
- JR = Junior Accelerator Programme entrant
- CO = College Accelerator Programme entrant
- NG = Next Gen Accelerator Program entrant
- w/o = Walkover
- r = Retired
- d = Defaulted

=== Finals ===
Semifinals
1 | (Spain) Juan Carlos Ferrero | 6 | 6
(Spain) Albert Portas | 3 | 1
5 | (Romania) Andrei Pavel | 2 | 6 | 2
Q | (Spain) Félix Mantilla | 6 | 3 | 6

Final
1 | (Spain) Juan Carlos Ferrero | 7^{7} | 4 | 6
Q | (Spain) Félix Mantilla | 6^{3} | 6 | 3

=== Top half ===
First round
1 | (Spain) J C Ferrero | 6 | 7^{7}
(Israel) H Levy | 3 | 6^{2}
(Czech Republic) C Doseděl | 6 | 6
WC | (Portugal) E Couto | 3 | 4
(Slovakia) K Kučera | 6 | 7^{7}
(Russia) N Davydenko | 3 | 6^{3}
Q | (Spain) A Montañés | 6 | 6
6 | (United States) M Chang | 1 | 3
3 | (Slovakia) D Hrbatý | 6 | 7
(Russia) M Youzhny | 1 | 5
WC | (Portugal) T Sousa | 5 | 4
(Netherlands) J Siemerink | 7 | 6
(Italy) G Pozzi | 3 | 6 | 3
(Spain) A Portas | 6 | 4 | 6
(Argentina) G Coria | 7^{11} | 6
7 | (Ecuador) N Lapentti | 6^{9} | 0

Second round
1 | (Spain) J C Ferrero | 6 | 6
(Czech Republic) C Doseděl | 3 | 0
(Slovakia) K Kučera | 3 | 3
Q | (Spain) A Montañés | 6 | 6
3 | (Slovakia) D Hrbatý | 6 | 6
(Netherlands) J Siemerink | 1 | 3
(Spain) A Portas | 6^{2} | 6 | 6
(Argentina) G Coria | 7^{7} | 4 | 1

Quarterfinals
1 | (Spain) J C Ferrero | 6 | 6
Q | (Spain) A Montañés | 2 | 4
3 | (Slovakia) D Hrbatý | 2 | 4
(Spain) A Portas | 6 | 6

Semifinals
1 | (Spain) J C Ferrero | 6 | 6
(Spain) A Portas | 3 | 1

=== Bottom half ===
First round
5 | (Romania) A Pavel | 6 | 6
Q | (Belgium) X Malisse | 1 | 1
Q | (Spain) J A Viloca | 2 | 6^{4}
(Spain) D Sánchez | 6 | 7^{7}
(Czech Republic) M Tabara | 3 | 4
(Spain) A Martín | 6 | 6
(Belgium) C Rochus | 4 | 6^{3}
WC/4 | (Argentina) F Squillari | 6 | 7^{7}
8 | (Spain) A Costa | 4 | 2
(Austria) M Hipfl | 6 | 6
(Spain) J Balcells | 6 | 3
(Ukraine) A Medvedev | 2 | 0^{r}
(Czech Republic) J Novák | 6 | 4 | 3
Q | (Spain) F Mantilla | 4 | 6 | 6
(Austria) S Koubek | 4 | 1
2 | (United Kingdom) T Henman | 6 | 6

Second round
5 | (Romania) A Pavel | 6 | 6
(Spain) D Sánchez | 4 | 1
(Spain) A Martín | 3 | 6 | 3
WC/4 | (Argentina) F Squillari | 6 | 2 | 6
(Austria) M Hipfl | 5 | 6 | 6
(Spain) J Balcells | 7 | 4 | 0
Q | (Spain) F Mantilla | 7 | 6
2 | (United Kingdom) T Henman | 5 | 1

Quarterfinals
5 | (Romania) A Pavel | 7^{8} | 7^{8}
WC/4 | (Argentina) F Squillari | 6^{6} | 6^{6}
(Austria) M Hipfl | 6 | 3 | 1
Q | (Spain) F Mantilla | 3 | 6 | 6

Semifinals
5 | (Romania) A Pavel | 2 | 6 | 2
Q | (Spain) F Mantilla | 6 | 3 | 6
