= 2000 Estoril Open – Men's singles =

Men's singles
- 2000 Estoril Open

Final
- Champion: (Spain) Carlos Moyá
- Runner-up: (Spain) Francisco Clavet
- Score: 6–3, 6–2

Details
- Draw: 32
- Seeds: 8

Events
Singles	men	women
Doubles	men	women
- Estoril Open

Albert Costa was the defending champion, but lost in the first round this year.

Carlos Moyá won the tournament, beating Francisco Clavet in the final, 6–3, 6–2.

== Seeds ==
1. (Russia) Yevgeny Kafelnikov (first round)
2. (Sweden) Magnus Norman (second round)
3. (Ecuador) Nicolás Lapentti (semifinals)
4. (United Kingdom) Tim Henman (quarterfinals)
5. (Spain) Albert Costa (first round)
6. (Argentina) Mariano Zabaleta (first round)
7. (Spain) Félix Mantilla (second round)
8. (France) Nicolas Escudé (quarterfinals)

== Draw ==
Key

- Q = Qualifier
- WC = Wild card
- LL = Lucky loser
- Alt = Alternate
- ITF = ITF entry
- PR = Protected ranking
- SR = Special ranking
- SE = Special exempt
- JE = Junior exempt
- JR = Junior Accelerator Programme entrant
- CO = College Accelerator Programme entrant
- NG = Next Gen Accelerator Program entrant
- w/o = Walkover
- r = Retired
- d = Defaulted

=== Finals ===
Semifinals
(Spain) Francisco Clavet	6	6
3	(Ecuador) Nicolás Lapentti	4	3
(Ukraine) Andrei Medvedev	3	4
WC	(Spain) Carlos Moyá	6	6

Final
(Spain) Francisco Clavet	3	2
WC	(Spain) Carlos Moyá	6	6

=== Top half ===
First round
1	(Russia) Y Kafelnikov	7^{8}	6^{5}	2
(Spain) F Clavet	6^{6}	7^{7}	6
(Argentina) JI Chela	6	6
WC	(Portugal) B Mota	3	4
(Costa Rica) JA Marín	6	6
Q	(Spain) F López	1	4
WC	(Portugal) N Marques	4	3
8	(France) N Escudé	6	6
3	(Ecuador) N Lapentti	6	6
(Croatia) I Ljubičić	4	3
(Romania) A Pavel	0	7^{7}	6^{7}
(Australia) R Fromberg	6	6^{5}	7^{9}
Q	(Argentina) D Nalbandian	2	1
(Argentina) F Squillari	6	6
(Spain) JC Ferrero	6	6
6	(Argentina) M Zabaleta	3	4

Second round
(Spain) F Clavet	6	7
(Argentina) JI Chela	4	5
(Costa Rica) JA Marín	1	2
8	(France) N Escudé	6	6
3	(Ecuador) N Lapentti	3	6	6
(Australia) R Fromberg	6	3	2
(Argentina) F Squillari	4	4
(Spain) JC Ferrero	6	6

Quarterfinals
(Spain) F Clavet	6	6
8	(France) N Escudé	3	2
3	(Ecuador) N Lapentti	7^{8}	6
(Spain) JC Ferrero	6^{6}	4

Semifinals
(Spain) F Clavet	6	6
3	(Ecuador) N Lapentti	4	3

=== Bottom half ===
First round
5	(Spain) A Costa	6	3	4
(Ukraine) A Medvedev	2	6	6
LL	(Austria) M Hipfl	7^{7}	6
(Spain) A Berasategui	6^{3}	3
(Argentina) G Cañas	3	4
(Argentina) G Gaudio	6	6
Q	(Spain) O Burrieza-López	3	4
4	(United Kingdom) T Henman	6	6
7	(Spain) F Mantilla	6	6
(Spain) G Blanco	3	1
(Germany) R Schüttler	5	2
Q	(Czech Republic) B Ulihrach	7	6
(Romania) A Voinea	4	4
WC	(Spain) C Moyá	6	6
(France) J Golmard	6^{1}	1
2	(Sweden) M Norman	7^{7}	6

Second round
(Ukraine) A Medvedev	6	6
LL	(Austria) M Hipfl	2	4
(Argentina) G Gaudio	4	4
4	(United Kingdom) T Henman	6	6
7	(Spain) F Mantilla	4	3
Q	(Czech Republic) B Ulihrach	6	6
WC	(Spain) C Moyá	6	6
2	(Sweden) M Norman	1	3

Quarterfinals
(Ukraine) A Medvedev	6	6
4	(United Kingdom) T Henman	2	3
Q	(Czech Republic) B Ulihrach	6	1	2
WC	(Spain) C Moyá	4	6	6

Semifinals
(Ukraine) A Medvedev	3	4
WC	(Spain) C Moyá	6	6
