= 2001 Estoril Open – Women's singles =

Women's singles
- 2001 Estoril Open

Final
- Champion: (Spain) Ángeles Montolio
- Runner-up: (Russia) Elena Bovina
- Score: 3–6, 6–3, 6–2

Details
- Draw: 32
- Seeds: 8

Events
Singles	men	women
Doubles	men	women
- Estoril Open

Anke Huber was the defending champion but lost in the first round to Denisa Chládková.

Ángeles Montolio won in the final 3–6, 6–3, 6–2 against Elena Bovina.

== Seeds ==
A champion seed is indicated in bold text while text in italics indicates the round in which that seed was eliminated.

1. (Germany) Anke Huber (first round)
2. (Bulgaria) Magdalena Maleeva (second round)
3. (Belgium) Justine Henin (semifinals)
4. (Austria) Barbara Schett (second round)
5. (Spain) Magüi Serna (second round)
6. (Luxembourg) Anne Kremer (second round)
7. (Croatia) Silvija Talaja (first round)
8. (Italy) Tathiana Garbin (quarterfinals)

== Draw ==
Key

- Q = Qualifier
- WC = Wild card
- LL = Lucky loser
- Alt = Alternate
- ITF = ITF entry
- PR = Protected ranking
- SR = Special ranking
- SE = Special exempt
- JE = Junior exempt
- JR = Junior Accelerator Programme entrant
- CO = College Accelerator Programme entrant
- NG = Next Gen Accelerator Program entrant
- w/o = Walkover
- r = Retired
- d = Defaulted

First round
1	(Germany) A Huber	5	**6**	2
(Czech Republic) **D Chládková**	**7**	3	**6**
(Italy) **R Grande**	**6**	**6**
(Switzerland) M Vavrinec	4	0
(Hungary) R Kuti-Kis	3	4
(Spain) **Á Montolio**	**6**	**6**
(Czech Republic) A Gerši	4	**7^{7}**	4
6	(Luxembourg) **A Kremer**	**6**	6^{2}	**6**
3	(Belgium) **J Henin**	**7^{7}**	4	**6**
(Spain) A Medina Garrigues	6^{3}	**6**	4
Q	(Bulgaria) L Bacheva	2	2
(Spain) **M Marrero**	**6**	**6**
(Austria) S Plischke	4	1
(Italy) **F Schiavone**	**6**	**6**
(France) **S Pitkowski**	**6**	**6**
7	(Croatia) S Talaja	2	3
5	(Spain) **M Serna**	**6**	**6**
(Germany) B Rittner	3	4
Q	(Russia) **E Bovina**	**6**	**7**
Q	(Madagascar) D Randriantefy	3	5
WC	(Portugal) A C Nogueira	3	5
(Slovenia) **T Pisnik**	**6**	**7**
WC	(Portugal) F Piedade	2	0
4	(Austria) **B Schett**	**6**	**6**
8	(Italy) **T Garbin**	2	**6**	**6**
(Belarus) T Poutchek	**6**	1	2
(Slovakia) K Habšudová	2	4
Q	(Slovakia) **J Husárová**	**6**	**6**
(Germany) **J Kandarr**	**6**	**7^{7}**
(Czech Republic) K Hrdličková	2	6^{5}
(Switzerland) E Gagliardi	5	4
2	(Bulgaria) **M Maleeva**	**7**	**6**

Second round
(Czech Republic) D Chládková	**6**	4	6^{5}
(Italy) **R Grande**	1	**6**	**7^{7}**
(Spain) **Á Montolio**	**6**	**6**
6	(Luxembourg) A Kremer	2	2
3	(Belgium) **J Henin**	**6**	**6**
(Spain) M Marrero	4	3
(Italy) **F Schiavone**	**6**	**6**
(France) S Pitkowski	1	2
5	(Spain) M Serna	3	**6**	1
Q	(Russia) **E Bovina**	**6**	2	**6**
(Slovenia) **T Pisnik**	**7^{7}**	**6**
4	(Austria) B Schett	6^{5}	1
8	(Italy) **T Garbin**	**6**	**6**
Q	(Slovakia) J Husárová	4	1
(Germany) **J Kandarr**	**6**	**7**
2	(Bulgaria) M Maleeva	3	5

Quarterfinals
(Italy) R Grande	3	4
(Spain) **Á Montolio**	**6**	**6**
3	(Belgium) **J Henin**	**6**	**6**
(Italy) F Schiavone	2	4
Q	(Russia) **E Bovina**	4	**7**	**6**
(Slovenia) T Pisnik	**6**	5	4
8	(Italy) T Garbin	5	2
(Germany) **J Kandarr**	**7**	**6**

Semifinals
(Spain) **Á Montolio**	5	**7^{7}**	**6**
3	(Belgium) J Henin	**7**	6^{4}	4
Q	(Russia) **E Bovina**	**7**	**6**
(Germany) J Kandarr	5	3

Final
(Spain) **Ángeles Montolio**	3	**6**	**6**
Q	(Russia) Elena Bovina	**6**	3	2
