= 2000 Estoril Open =

- Date: 10–27 April
- Edition: 11th(ATP) / 4th(WTA)
- Surface: Clay / outdoor
- Location: Oeiras, Portugal
- Venue: Estoril Court Central

Champions

Men's singles
- (Spain) Carlos Moyá

Women's singles
- (Germany) Anke Huber

Men's doubles
- (United States) Donald Johnson / (South Africa) Piet Norval

Women's doubles
- (Slovenia) Tina Križan / (Slovenia) Katarina Srebotnik
- Estoril Open

The 2000 Estoril Open was a tennis tournament played on outdoor clay courts. This event was the 11th edition of the Estoril Open for the men (the 4th for the women), included in the 2000 ATP Tour International Series and in the 2000 WTA Tour Tier IV Series. Both the men's and the women's events took place at the Estoril Court Central, in Oeiras, Portugal, from 10 April through 17 April 2000. Carlos Moyá and Anke Huber won the singles titles.

== Finals ==
=== Men's singles ===
(Spain) Carlos Moyá defeated (Spain) Francisco Clavet, 6–3, 6–2

=== Women's singles ===
(Germany) Anke Huber defeated (France) Nathalie Dechy, 6–2, 1–6, 7–5

=== Men's doubles ===
(United States) Donald Johnson / (South Africa) Piet Norval defeated (South Africa) David Adams / (Australia) Joshua Eagle, 6–4, 7–5

=== Women's doubles ===
(Slovenia) Tina Križan / (Slovenia) Katarina Srebotnik defeated (Netherlands) Amanda Hopmans / (Spain) Cristina Torrens Valero, 6–0, 7–6^{(11–9)}
