= 2002 Copa Colsanitas – Singles =

Singles
- 2002 Copa Colsanitas

Final
- Champion: (Colombia) Fabiola Zuluaga
- Runner-up: (Slovenia) Katarina Srebotnik
- Score: 6–1, 6–4

Details
- Draw: 30 (2WC/4Q)
- Seeds: 8

Events
Singles	Doubles
← 2001 ·	Copa Colsanitas	· 2003 →

Paola Suárez was the defending champion but lost in quarterfinals to eventual tournament winner Fabiola Zuluaga.

Fabiola Zuluaga won the title by defeating Katarina Srebotnik 6–1, 6–4 in the final.

== Seeds ==
The first two seeds received a bye into the second round.

1. (Spain) Cristina Torrens Valero (semifinals)
2. (Spain) Gala León García (second round)
3. (Argentina) Paola Suárez (quarterfinals)
4. (Argentina) Mariana Díaz Oliva (first round)
5. (Paraguay) Rossana de los Ríos (quarterfinals)
6. (Spain) Virginia Ruano Pascual (first round)
7. (Germany) Bianka Lamade (first round)
8. (Hungary) Rita Kuti-Kis (second round)

== Draw ==
=== Key ===
- Q = Qualifier
- WC = Wild card
- LL = Lucky loser
- Alt = Alternate
- SE = Special exempt
- PR = Protected ranking
- ITF = ITF entry
- JE = Junior exempt
- w/o = Walkover
- r = Retired
- d = Defaulted
- SR = Special ranking

=== Finals ===
Semifinals
1	(Spain) Cristina Torrens Valero	4	4
WC	(Colombia) Fabiola Zuluaga	6	6
(Slovenia) Katarina Srebotnik	5	7	6
(Colombia) Catalina Castaño	7	5	4

Final
WC	(Colombia) Fabiola Zuluaga	6	6
(Slovenia) Katarina Srebotnik	1	4

=== Top half ===
First round
(Spain) C Martínez Granados	6^{6}	6	3
(Spain) E Bes	7^{8}	4	6
(Spain) M Sánchez Lorenzo	7^{7}	6
Q	(Ecuador) M Correa	6^{2}	4
(Bulgaria) L Bacheva	1	3
5	(Paraguay) R de los Ríos	6	6
3	(Argentina) P Suárez	6	6
(Italy) ME Camerin	1	3
Q	(Romania) A Vanc	3	6	7
Q	(Romania) R Sandu	6	4	5
(Croatia) M Palaveršić-Coopersmith	3	5
WC	(Colombia) F Zuluaga	6	7
(Japan) R Fujiwara	2	7	2
8	(Hungary) R Kuti-Kis	6	5	6

Second round
1	(Spain) C Torrens Valero	3	6	6
(Spain) E Bes	6	4	1
(Spain) M Sánchez Lorenzo	1	3
5	(Paraguay) R de los Ríos	6	6
3	(Argentina) P Suárez	6	6
Q	(Romania) A Vanc	3	3
WC	(Colombia) F Zuluaga	6	6
8	(Hungary) R Kuti-Kis	3	2

Quarterfinals
1	(Spain) C Torrens Valero	6	6
5	(Paraguay) R de los Ríos	2	1
3	(Argentina) P Suárez	2	4
WC	(Colombia) F Zuluaga	6	6

Semifinals
1	(Spain) C Torrens Valero	4	4
WC	(Colombia) F Zuluaga	6	6

=== Bottom half ===
First round
6	(Spain) V Ruano Pascual	5	1
(Czech Republic) A Vašková	7	6
(France) C Beigbeder	6	6
WC	(Colombia) R Farah	0	1
(Czech Republic) K Koukalová	7^{7}	3	4
(Slovenia) K Srebotnik	6^{2}	6	6
(Slovakia) Ľ Cervanová	7^{7}	3	6
4	(Argentina) M Díaz Oliva	6^{3}	6	0
7	(Germany) B Lamade	1	4
(Argentina) ME Salerni	6	6
Q	(Spain) L Domínguez Lino	7^{7}	7^{7}
(France) É Loit	6^{3}	6^{5}
(Spain) N Llagostera Vives	7	5	5
(Colombia) C Castaño	5	7	7

Second round
(Czech Republic) A Vašková	6	4	4
(France) C Beigbeder	3	6	6
(Slovenia) K Srebotnik	6	6
(Slovakia) Ľ Cervanová	1	1
(Argentina) ME Salerni	7^{7}	6
Q	(Spain) L Domínguez Lino	6^{4}	4
(Colombia) C Castaño	6	2	6
2	(Spain) G León García	3	6	2

Quarterfinals
(France) C Beigbeder	1	6^{5}
(Slovenia) K Srebotnik	6	7^{7}
(Argentina) ME Salerni	6	5	4
(Colombia) C Castaño	1	7	6

Semifinals
(Slovenia) K Srebotnik	5	7	6
(Colombia) C Castaño	7	5	4

== Qualifying ==
=== Seeds ===
1. (Spain) ~~Conchita Martínez Granados~~ (moved to Main Draw)
2. (Czech Republic) Eva Martincová (second round)
3. (Romania) Andreea Vanc (qualified)
4. (Brazil) Joana Cortez (second round)
5. (Netherlands) Anousjka van Exel (second round)
6. (Romania) Raluca Sandu (qualified)
7. (Spain) Mariam Ramón Climent (second round)
8. (Germany) Julia Schruff (second round)
9. (Germany) Scarlett Werner (second round)

=== Qualifiers ===
1. (Romania) Raluca Sandu
2. (Ecuador) Mariana Correa
3. (Romania) Andreea Vanc
4. (Spain) Lourdes Domínguez Lino

=== Qualifying draw ===
==== First qualifier ====
First round				Second round					Qualifying competition
				5	(Netherlands) Anousjka van Exel	6	2	6^{2}
WC	(Slovenia) Tina Križan	6	6	WC	(Slovenia) Tina Križan	4	6	7^{7}
WC	(Argentina) Laura Montalvo	2	1						WC	(Slovenia) Tina Križan	5	6^{5}
WC	(Colombia) Ana Milena Ramírez	6	6						6	(Romania) Raluca Sandu	7	7^{7}
	(Spain) Desiree Roset Torres	3	2	WC	(Colombia) Ana Milena Ramírez	1	1
				6	(Romania) Raluca Sandu	6	6

==== Second qualifier ====
First round
WC	(Colombia) Vivian Rojas	2	0
WC	(Ecuador) Mariana Correa	6	6
WC	(Colombia) Sonia Bernal	3	3
(Germany) Caroline Schneider	6	6
WC	(Colombia) Lilian Aguilera	0	0
8	(Germany) Julia Schruff	6	6

Second round
2	(Czech Republic) Eva Martincová	6	4	4
WC	(Ecuador) Mariana Correa	3	6	6
(Germany) Caroline Schneider	6	6
8	(Germany) Julia Schruff	3	1

Qualifying competition
WC	(Ecuador) Mariana Correa	6	6
(Germany) Caroline Schneider	1	1

==== Third qualifier ====
First round
3	(Romania) Andreea Vanc	6	6
(Japan) Keiko Tameishi	1	1
WC	(Spain) Cristina Cabello	1	2
(Russia) Galina Voskoboeva	6	6
(Italy) Giulia Casoni	6	6
(Venezuela) Stephanie Schaer	1	3
(Colombia) Catalina Villegas	2	1
9	(Germany) Scarlett Werner	6	6

Second round
3	(Romania) Andreea Vanc	7	6
(Russia) Galina Voskoboeva	5	4
(Italy) Giulia Casoni	6	6
9	(Germany) Scarlett Werner	0	0

Qualifying competition
3	(Romania) Andreea Vanc	7^{7}	6
(Italy) Giulia Casoni	6^{1}	3

==== Fourth qualifier ====
First round
4	(Brazil) Joana Cortez	6^{4}	6	6
(United States) Elizabeth Schmidt	7^{7}	4	1
(Argentina) Erica Krauth	6	2	1
(Spain) Rosa María Sitja	3	6	6
WC	(Colombia) Milena Chisaca	0	0
(Spain) Lourdes Domínguez Lino	6	6
WC	(Colombia) Carolina Escamilla	1	4
7	(Spain) Mariam Ramón Climent	6	6

Second round
4	(Brazil) Joana Cortez	2	2
(Spain) Rosa María Sitja	6	6
(Spain) Lourdes Domínguez Lino	6	6
7	(Spain) Mariam Ramón Climent	0	1

Qualifying competition
(Spain) Rosa María Sitja	2	6	1
(Spain) Lourdes Domínguez Lino	6	1	6
