= 2003 Tashkent Open – Singles =

Singles
- 2003 Tashkent Open

Final
- Champion: (Spain) Virginia Ruano Pascual
- Runner-up: (Japan) Saori Obata
- Score: 6–2, 7–6^{(7–2)}

Details
- Draw: 32
- Seeds: 8

Events
Singles	Doubles
- Tashkent Open

Marie-Gaïané Mikaelian was the defending champion from 2002, but she chose not to compete in 2003.

Virginia Ruano Pascual won the title in two sets over Saori Obata.

== Draw ==
=== Seeds ===
1. (Hungary) Petra Mandula (second round)
2. (Switzerland) Emmanuelle Gagliardi (semifinals)
3. (Japan) Saori Obata (final)
4. (Spain) Virginia Ruano Pascual (winner)
5. (Italy) Flavia Pennetta (second round)
6. (United States) Jill Craybas (quarterfinals)
7. (Indonesia) Angelique Widjaja (second round)
8. (Croatia) Jelena Kostanić (quarterfinals)

Key

- Q = Qualifier
- WC = Wild card
- LL = Lucky loser
- Alt = Alternate
- ITF = ITF entry
- PR = Protected ranking
- SR = Special ranking
- SE = Special exempt
- JE = Junior exempt
- JR = Junior Accelerator Programme entrant
- CO = College Accelerator Programme entrant
- NG = Next Gen Accelerator Program entrant
- w/o = Walkover
- r = Retired
- d = Defaulted

=== Finals ===
Semifinals
(Spain) Arantxa Parra Santonja	3	6	6^{3}
4	(Spain) Virginia Ruano Pascual	6	4	7
3	(Japan) Saori Obata	7	6
2	(Switzerland) Emmanuelle Gagliardi	5	3

Final
4	(Spain) Virginia Ruano Pascual	6	7
3	(Japan) Saori Obata	2	6^{2}

=== Top half ===
First round
1	(Hungary) P Mandula	6	7
WC	(Uzbekistan) A Amanmuradova	4	6^{3}
(Spain) A Parra Santonja	6	6
(Slovakia) M Suchá	4	4
(Italy) An Serra Zanetti	1	2
Q	(Russia) L Skavronskaia	6	6
(Luxembourg) C Schaul	7	4	6^{5}
7	(Indonesia) A Widjaja	6^{5}	6	7
4	(Spain) V Ruano Pascual	6	6
Q	(Germany) Ad Barna	2	3
(Czech Republic) R Voráčová	4	0	r
(France) S Foretz	6	4
Q	(Russia) M Goloviznina	3	3
(Ukraine) Y Beygelzimer	6	6
(Russia) E Kulikovskaia	1	1
6	(United States) J Craybas	6	6

Second round
1	(Hungary) P Mandula	5	1
(Spain) A Parra Santonja	7	6
Q	(Russia) L Skavronskaia	7	6
7	(Indonesia) A Widjaja	6^{3}	1
4	(Spain) V Ruano Pascual	6	6
(France) S Foretz	3	1
(Ukraine) Y Beygelzimer	6	6^{5}	3
6	(United States) J Craybas	4	7	6

Quarterfinals
(Spain) A Parra Santonja	6	6
Q	(Russia) L Skavronskaia	3	4
4	(Spain) V Ruano Pascual	6	6
6	(United States) J Craybas	2	1

Semifinals
(Spain) A Parra Santonja	3	6	6^{3}
4	(Spain) V Ruano Pascual	6	4	7

=== Bottom half ===
First round
8	(Croatia) J Kostanić	6	6
(Slovakia) E Fislová	1	2
(Russia) M Kirilenko	3	7	6
(Israel) T Obziler	6	6^{1}	4
(China) J Zheng	6	7
WC	(Uzbekistan) I Israilova	4	5
(Belarus) T Poutchek	3	2
3	(Japan) S Obata	6	6
5	(Italy) F Pennetta	6	3	6
(Italy) T Garbin	3	6	2
(Italy) Ad Serra Zanetti	6	6
Q	(Japan) S Okamoto	3	0
(Belarus) O Barabanschikova	5	1
(Austria) P Wartusch	7	6
(Russia) A Rodionova	2	4
2	(Switzerland) E Gagliardi	6	6

Second round
8	(Croatia) J Kostanić	6	7
(Russia) M Kirilenko	4	5
(China) J Zheng	1	1
3	(Japan) S Obata	6	6
5	(Italy) F Pennetta	4	5
(Italy) Ad Serra Zanetti	6	7
(Austria) P Wartusch	1	6^{4}
2	(Switzerland) E Gagliardi	6	7

Quarterfinals
8	(Croatia) J Kostanić	7	0	4
3	(Japan) S Obata	5	6	6
(Italy) Ad Serra Zanetti	2	4
2	(Switzerland) E Gagliardi	6	6

Semifinals
3	(Japan) S Obata	7	6
2	(Switzerland) E Gagliardi	5	3
