= 2001 Copa Colsanitas – Doubles =

Doubles
- 2001 Copa Colsanitas

Final
- Champions: (Italy) Tathiana Garbin (Slovakia) Janette Husárová
- Runners-up: (Argentina) Laura Montalvo (Argentina) Paola Suárez
- Score: 6–4, 2–6, 6–4

Details
- Draw: 16
- Seeds: 4

Events
Singles	Doubles
← 2000 ·	Copa Colsanitas	· 2002 →

Laura Montalvo and Paola Suárez were the defending champions but lost in the final 6–4, 2–6, 6–4 against Tathiana Garbin and Janette Husárová.

== Seeds ==
Champion seeds are indicated in bold text while text in italics indicates the round in which those seeds were eliminated.

1. (Argentina) Laura Montalvo / (Argentina) Paola Suárez (final)
2. (Italy) **Tathiana Garbin** / (Slovakia) **Janette Husárová (champions)**
3. (Austria) Sylvia Plischke / (Austria) Patricia Wartusch (first round)
4. (Spain) Rosa María Andrés / (Spain) Cristina Torrens Valero (first round)

== Draw ==
=== Key ===
- Q = Qualifier
- WC = Wild card
- LL = Lucky loser
- Alt = Alternate
- SE = Special exempt
- PR = Protected ranking
- ITF = ITF entry
- JE = Junior exempt
- w/o = Walkover
- r = Retired
- d = Defaulted
- SR = Special ranking

First round
1	(Argentina) **L Montalvo** (Argentina) **P Suárez**	**6**	**6**
(Spain) A Goñi (Spain) N Llagostera	2	1
(Japan) R Fujiwara (Australia) A Grahame	5	6^{3}
(Czech Republic) **E Martincová** (Germany) **E Wagner**	**7**	**7^{7}**
3	(Austria) S Plischke (Austria) P Wartusch	**6**	4	4
(Argentina) **M E Salerni** (Venezuela) **M Sequera**	3	**6**	**6**
Q	(Argentina) E Krauth (Argentina) V Krauth	1	1
(Brazil) **J Cortez** (Argentina) **C Fernández**	**6**	**6**
(Spain) **L Domínguez Lino** (Spain) **M J Martínez**	**6**	**6**
(Spain) E Bes (Argentina) M Díaz Oliva	4	3
WC	(Colombia) **C Castaño** (Colombia) **C Giraldo**	**6**	4	**7^{7}**
4	(Spain) R M Andrés (Spain) C Torrens Valero	4	**6**	6^{4}
(Spain) **M Ramon Climent** (Italy) **A Serra Zanetti**	**6**	5	**6**
(Australia) T Musgrave (Spain) A Ortuño	4	**7**	3
(Hungary) P Mandula (Hungary) K Marosi-Aracama	4	2
2	(Italy) **T Garbin** (Slovakia) **J Husárová**	**6**	**6**

Quarterfinals
1	(Argentina) **L Montalvo** (Argentina) **P Suárez**	**6**	**6**
(Czech Republic) E Martincová (Germany) E Wagner	3	2
(Argentina) **M E Salerni** (Venezuela) **M Sequera**	**6**	**6**
(Brazil) J Cortez (Argentina) C Fernández	3	3
(Spain) **L Domínguez Lino** (Spain) **M J Martínez**	**6**	**6**
WC	(Colombia) C Castaño (Colombia) C Giraldo	0	1
(Spain) M Ramon Climent (Italy) A Serra Zanetti	4	1
2	(Italy) **T Garbin** (Slovakia) **J Husárová**	**6**	**6**

Semifinals
1	(Argentina) **L Montalvo** (Argentina) **P Suárez**	**6**	2	**7^{7}**
(Argentina) M E Salerni (Venezuela) M Sequera	4	**6**	6^{5}
(Spain) L Domínguez Lino (Spain) M J Martínez	3	0
2	(Italy) **T Garbin** (Slovakia) **J Husárová**	**6**	**6**

Final
1	(Argentina) Laura Montalvo (Argentina) Paola Suárez	4	**6**	4
2	(Italy) **Tathiana Garbin** (Slovakia) **Janette Husárová**	**6**	2	**6**
