= 2003 Tashkent Open – Doubles =

Doubles
- 2003 Tashkent Open

Final
- Champions: (Ukraine) Yuliya Beygelzimer (Belarus) Tatiana Poutchek
- Runners-up: (China) Li Ting (China) Sun Tiantian
- Score: 6–3, 7–6^{(7–0)}

Events
Singles	Doubles
- Tashkent Open

Tatiana Perebiynis and Tatiana Poutchek were the defending champions, but Perebiynis did not compete this year. Poutchek teamed up with Yuliya Beygelzimer and successfully defended her title, by defeating Li Ting and Sun Tiantian 6–3, 7–6^{(7–0)} in the final.

== Seeds ==
1. (Hungary) Petra Mandula / (Austria) Patricia Wartusch (quarterfinals)
2. (Switzerland) Emmanuelle Gagliardi / (Indonesia) Angelique Widjaja (semifinals)
3. (China) Li Ting / (China) Sun Tiantian (final)
4. (Ukraine) Yuliya Beygelzimer / (Belarus) Tatiana Poutchek (champion)

== Draw ==
Key

- Q = Qualifier
- WC = Wild card
- LL = Lucky loser
- Alt = Alternate
- ITF = ITF entry
- PR = Protected ranking
- SR = Special ranking
- SE = Special exempt
- JE = Junior exempt
- JR = Junior Accelerator Programme entrant
- CO = College Accelerator Programme entrant
- NG = Next Gen Accelerator Program entrant
- w/o = Walkover
- r = Retired
- d = Defaulted

=== Draw ===
First round
1	(Hungary) P Mandula (Austria) P Wartusch	6	4	6
(France) S Foretz (Italy) An Serra Zanetti	4	6	4
(Belarus) D Kustova (Ukraine) E Tatarkova	6	6
WC	(Uzbekistan) A Amanmuradova (Uzbekistan) I Israilova	2	4
4	(Ukraine) Y Beygelzimer (Belarus) T Poutchek	3	6	6
(United States) J Craybas (Japan) S Obata	6	1	3
(Ukraine) Y Fedak (Luxembourg) C Schaul	6^{3}	3
(Republic of Ireland) K Liggan (Spain) A Parra Santonja	7^{7}	6
Q	(Ukraine) A Bondarenko (Ukraine) V Bondarenko	5	6^{6}
(Russia) M Kirilenko (Czech Republic) R Voráčová	7	7^{8}
(China) Z Yan (China) J Zheng	6^{6}	0
3	(China) T Li (China) T Sun	7^{8}	6
(Croatia) J Kostanić (Russia) A Rodionova	7	6
LL	(Russia) E Kozhokina (Germany) C Schneider	5	3
(Russia) G Fokina (Russia) E Kulikovskaya	3	1
2	(Switzerland) E Gagliardi (Indonesia) A Widjaja	6	6

Quarterfinals
1	(Hungary) P Mandula (Austria) P Wartusch	3	3
(Belarus) D Kustova (Ukraine) E Tatarkova	6	6
4	(Ukraine) Y Beygelzimer (Belarus) T Poutchek	6	6
(Republic of Ireland) K Liggan (Spain) A Parra Santonja	2	3
(Russia) M Kirilenko (Czech Republic) R Voráčová	3	2
3	(China) T Li (China) T Sun	6	6
(Croatia) J Kostanić (Russia) A Rodionova	7^{7}	0	4
2	(Switzerland) E Gagliardi (Indonesia) A Widjaja	6^{5}	6	6

Semifinals
(Belarus) D Kustova (Ukraine) E Tatarkova	4	4
4	(Ukraine) Y Beygelzimer (Belarus) T Poutchek	6	6
3	(China) T Li (China) T Sun	6	6
2	(Switzerland) E Gagliardi (Indonesia) A Widjaja	1	3

Final
4	(Ukraine) Y Beygelzimer (Belarus) T Poutchek	6	7^{7}
3	(China) T Li (China) T Sun	3	6^{0}
