= 2000 Copa Colsanitas – Singles =

Singles
- 2000 Copa Colsanitas

Final
- Champion: (Austria) Patricia Wartusch
- Runner-up: (Italy) Tathiana Garbin
- Score: 4–6, 6–1, 6–4

Details
- Draw: 32
- Seeds: 8

Events
Singles	Doubles
← 1999 ·	Copa Colsanitas	· 2001 →

Fabiola Zuluaga was the defending champion, but lost in second round to runner-up Tathiana Garbin.

Patricia Wartusch won the title by defeating Tathiana Garbin 4–6, 6–1, 6–4 in the final.

== Seeds ==
1. (Austria) Sylvia Plischke (semifinals)
2. (Colombia) Fabiola Zuluaga (second round)
3. (Spain) Cristina Torrens Valero (first round)
4. (Spain) Ángeles Montolio (second round)
5. (Switzerland) Emmanuelle Gagliardi (first round)
6. (Argentina) Paola Suárez (quarterfinals)
7. (Belarus) Olga Barabanschikova (quarterfinals)
8. (Italy) Rita Grande (first round)

== Draws ==
=== Key ===
- Q = Qualifier
- WC = Wild card
- LL = Lucky loser
- Alt = Alternate
- SE = Special exempt
- PR = Protected ranking
- ITF = ITF entry
- JE = Junior exempt
- w/o = Walkover
- r = Retired
- d = Defaulted
- SR = Special ranking

=== Finals ===
Semifinals
1	(Austria) Sylvia Plischke	4	3
(Austria) Patricia Wartusch	6	6
(Hungary) Rita Kuti-Kis	6	1	2
(Italy) Tathiana Garbin	2	6	6

Final
(Austria) Patricia Wartusch	4	6	6
(Italy) Tathiana Garbin	6	1	4

=== Top half ===
First round
1	(Austria) S Plischke	6	4	6
(Czech Republic) L Němečková	1	6	2
(United States) H Parkinson	2	2
(Netherlands) S Noorlander	6	6
(United States) S Reeves	6	2	6
(Germany) A Barna	2	6	0
(Italy) Ad Serra Zanetti	2	5
7	(Belarus) O Barabanschikova	6	7
4	(Spain) Á Montolio	7	6
(United States) L Wild	5	3
Q	(Spain) E Bes	3	6	3
(Austria) P Wartusch	6	4	6
(Russia) A Jidkova	5	4
(Hungary) P Mandula	7	6
WC	(Colombia) M Mesa	2	6^{5}
6	(Argentina) P Suárez	6	7^{7}

Second round
1	(Austria) S Plischke	7	6
(Netherlands) S Noorlander	5	3
(United States) S Reeves	3	3
7	(Belarus) O Barabanschikova	6	6
4	(Spain) Á Montolio	3	6	2
(Austria) P Wartusch	6	1	6
(Hungary) P Mandula	1	3
6	(Argentina) P Suárez	6	6

Quarterfinals
1	(Austria) S Plischke	6	6
7	(Belarus) O Barabanschikova	2	3
(Austria) P Wartusch	6	6
6	(Argentina) P Suárez	4	2

Semifinals
1	(Austria) S Plischke	4	3
(Austria) P Wartusch	6	6

=== Bottom half ===
First round
5	(Switzerland) E Gagliardi	3	6	6^{6}
(Argentina) F Labat	6	3	7^{8}
(Hungary) R Kuti-Kis	6	6
(Slovakia) Ľ Cervanová	2	1
Q	(Spain) G Riera	1	2
Q	(Spain) N Llagostera Vives	6	6
Q	(Poland) M Grzybowska	6	5	6
3	(Spain) C Torrens Valero	4	7	4
8	(Italy) R Grande	2	5
(United States) M Shaughnessy	6	7
(Canada) J Nejedly	0	0
WC	(Colombia) C Castaño	6	6
(Venezuela) M Vento	3	7^{7}	3
(Italy) T Garbin	6	6^{4}	6
(Argentina) M Díaz Oliva	1	3
2	(Colombia) F Zuluaga	6	6

Second round
(Argentina) F Labat	7^{12}	3	3
(Hungary) R Kuti-Kis	6^{10}	6	6
Q	(Spain) N Llagostera Vives	6^{4}	6	6
Q	(Poland) M Grzybowska	7^{7}	1	1
(United States) M Shaughnessy	6	6
WC	(Colombia) C Castaño	3	1
(Italy) T Garbin	6	6
2	(Colombia) F Zuluaga	1	4

Quarterfinals
(Hungary) R Kuti-Kis	6	6
Q	(Spain) N Llagostera Vives	3	0
(United States) M Shaughnessy	3	7^{7}	1
(Italy) T Garbin	6	6^{5}	6

Semifinals
(Hungary) R Kuti-Kis	6	1	2
(Italy) T Garbin	2	6	6
