= 2000 Copa Colsanitas =

- Date: 7–13 February
- Edition: 3rd
- Category: Tier IV
- Draw: 32S / 16D
- Prize money: $140,000
- Surface: Clay / outdoor
- Location: Bogotá, Colombia
- Venue: Club Campestre El Rancho

Champions

Singles
- (Austria) Patricia Wartusch

Doubles
- (Argentina) Laura Montalvo / (Argentina) Paola Suárez
← 1999 ·	Copa Colsanitas	· 2001 →

The 2000 Copa Colsanitas was a women's tennis tournament played on outdoor clay courts at the Club Campestre El Rancho in Bogotá, Colombia that was part of the Tier IV category of the 2000 WTA Tour. It was the third edition of the tournament and was held from 7 February through 13 February 2000. Unseeded Patricia Wartusch won the singles title and earned $22,000.

== Finals ==
=== Singles ===
(Austria) Patricia Wartusch defeated (Italy) Tathiana Garbin 4–6, 6–1, 6–4

- It was Wartusch's 1st singles title of her career.

=== Doubles ===
(Argentina) Laura Montalvo / (Argentina) Paola Suárez defeated (Hungary) Rita Kuti-Kis / (Hungary) Petra Mandula 6–4, 6–2
