= 2000 Copa Colsanitas – Doubles =

Doubles
- 2000 Copa Colsanitas

Final
- Champions: (Argentina) Laura Montalvo (Argentina) Paola Suárez
- Runners-up: (Hungary) Rita Kuti-Kis (Hungary) Petra Mandula
- Score: 6–4, 6–2

Details
- Draw: 16
- Seeds: 4

Events
Singles	Doubles
← 1999 ·	Copa Colsanitas	· 2001 →

Seda Noorlander and Christína Papadáki were the defending champions, but Papadáki did not compete this year after retiring from professional tennis in 1999. Noorlander teamed up with Giana Gutiérrez and lost in quarterfinals to Rosa María Andrés Rodríguez and Conchita Martínez Granados.

Laura Montalvo and Paola Suárez won the title by defeating Rita Kuti-Kis and Petra Mandula 6–4, 6–2 in the final.

== Seeds ==
1. (Argentina) Laura Montalvo / (Argentina) Paola Suárez (champions)
2. (Slovakia) Janette Husárová / (Argentina) Florencia Labat (first round)
3. (Belarus) Olga Barabanschikova / (United States) Meghann Shaughnessy (quarterfinals)
4. (Italy) Rita Grande / (Russia) Alina Jidkova (first round)

== Draw ==
=== Key ===
- Q = Qualifier
- WC = Wild card
- LL = Lucky loser
- Alt = Alternate
- SE = Special exempt
- PR = Protected ranking
- ITF = ITF entry
- JE = Junior exempt
- w/o = Walkover
- r = Retired
- d = Defaulted
- SR = Special ranking

=== Draw ===
First round
1	(Argentina) L Montalvo (Argentina) P Suárez	6	6
Q	(Brazil) J Cortez (Venezuela) M Sequera	2	3
(Spain) L Domínguez Lino (Italy) MP Zavagli	2	3
WC	(Colombia) M Mesa (Colombia) F Zuluaga	6	6
4	(Italy) R Grande (Russia) A Jidkova	7	6^{3}	3
(Colombia) G Gutiérrez (Netherlands) S Noorlander	5	7^{7}	6
(Spain) RM Andrés Rodríguez (Spain) C Martínez Granados	6	4	7^{7}
(United States) W Fix (United States) L Wild	2	6	6^{4}
(Italy) A Canepa (Italy) T Garbin	2	6	6
(United States) S Reeves (Spain) C Torrens Valero	6	1	1
(Brazil) V Menga (Spain) A Ortuño	6^{5}	6	6^{7}
3	(Belarus) O Barabanschikova (United States) M Shaughnessy	7^{7}	3	7^{9}
(Spain) E Bes (Spain) G Riera	6	6
(Switzerland) E Gagliardi (Austria) P Wartusch	3	2
(Hungary) R Kuti-Kis (Hungary) P Mandula	6	6
2	(Slovakia) J Husárová (Argentina) F Labat	2	4

Quarterfinals
1	(Argentina) L Montalvo (Argentina) P Suárez	3	6	6
WC	(Colombia) M Mesa (Colombia) F Zuluaga	6	4	1
(Colombia) G Gutiérrez (Netherlands) S Noorlander	2	6^{5}
(Spain) RM Andrés Rodríguez (Spain) C Martínez Granados	6	7^{7}
(Italy) A Canepa (Italy) T Garbin	6	6
3	(Belarus) O Barabanschikova (United States) M Shaughnessy	3	4
(Spain) E Bes (Spain) G Riera	1	3
(Hungary) R Kuti-Kis (Hungary) P Mandula	6	6

Semifinals
1	(Argentina) L Montalvo (Argentina) P Suárez	6	6^{9}	6
(Spain) RM Andrés Rodríguez (Spain) C Martínez Granados	4	7^{11}	4
(Italy) A Canepa (Italy) T Garbin	4	1
(Hungary) R Kuti-Kis (Hungary) P Mandula	6	6

Final
1	(Argentina) L Montalvo (Argentina) P Suárez	6	6
(Hungary) R Kuti-Kis (Hungary) P Mandula	4	2
