= 2001 Copa Colsanitas =

- Date: 19–25 February 2001
- Edition: 4th
- Category: Tier III
- Draw: 30S / 16D
- Prize money: $170,000
- Surface: Clay / outdoor
- Location: Bogotá, Colombia

Champions

Singles
- (Argentina) Paola Suárez

Doubles
- (Italy) Tathiana Garbin / (Slovakia) Janette Husárová
← 2000 ·	Copa Colsanitas	· 2002 →

The 2001 Copa Colsanitas was a women's tennis tournament played on outdoor clay courts at the Club Campestre El Rancho in Bogotá, Colombia that was part of Tier III of the 2001 WTA Tour. It was the fourth edition of the tournament and ran from 19 February through 25 February 2001. First-seeded Paola Suárez won the singles title and earned $27,000.

== Finals ==
=== Singles ===
(Argentina) Paola Suárez defeated (Hungary) Rita Kuti-Kis 6–2, 6–4

- It was Suárez's 1st singles title of the year and the 2nd of her career.

=== Doubles ===
(Italy) Tathiana Garbin / (Slovakia) Janette Husárová defeated (Argentina) Laura Montalvo / (Argentina) Paola Suárez 6–4, 2–6, 6–4

- It was Garbin's 1st title of the year and the 3rd of her career. It was Husárová's 2nd title of the year and the 7th of her career.
