= 2003 China Open (tennis) =

- Date: 15–21 September 2003
- Edition: 5th
- Category: WTA Tier II
- Draw: 28S / 16D
- Prize money: USD585,000
- Surface: Hard, outdoor
- Location: Shanghai, China

Champions

Singles
- (Russia) Elena Dementieva

Doubles
- (France) Émilie Loit / (Australia) Nicole Pratt
- China Open

The 2003 Polo Open was a women's tennis tournament played on outdoor hard courts in Shanghai, China. It was the 5th edition of the China Open, and was a Tier II tournament on the 2003 WTA Tour. The tournament was played between 15 – 21 September 2003. First-seeded Elena Dementieva won the singles title.

The tournament was not part of the 2003 ATP Tour, as no male events took place.

== Singles main-draw entrants ==
=== Seeds ===
Country	Player	Rank^{1}	Seed
RUS	Elena Dementieva	9	1
USA	Chanda Rubin	10	2
JPN	Ai Sugiyama	12	3
ESP	Conchita Martínez	13	4
FR Yugoslavia	Jelena Dokic	21	5
AUS	Alicia Molik	38	6
FRA	Émilie Loit	41	7
ZIM	Cara Black	44	8

- ^{1} Rankings are as of 8 September 2003.

=== Other entrants ===
The following players received wildcards into the singles main draw:

- (China) Sun Tiantian
- (China) Zheng Jie

The following players received entry from the singles qualifying draw:

- (Italy) Tathiana Garbin
- (Federal Republic of Yugoslavia) Jelena Janković
- (Paraguay) Rossana Neffa-de los Ríos
- (Slovakia) Martina Suchá

The following players received entry as lucky losers into the singles main draw:

- (United States) Jill Craybas

== Doubles main-draw entrants ==
=== Seeds ===
Country	Player	Country	Player	Rank^{1}	Seed
ESP	Conchita Martínez	INA	Angelique Widjaja	51	1
ZIM	Cara Black	AUS	Alicia Molik	57	2
HUN	Petra Mandula	AUT	Barbara Schett	60	3
SUI	Emmanuelle Gagliardi	USA	Chanda Rubin	65	4

- ^{1} Rankings as of 8 September 2003.

=== Other entrants ===
The following players received entry from the singles qualifying draw:

- (Japan) Aiko Nakamura / (Japan) Seiko Okamoto

The following pairs received entry as lucky losers into the doubles main draw:

- (China) Dong Yanhua / (China) Zhang Yao

== Finals ==
=== Singles ===
(Russia) Elena Dementieva defeated (United States) Chanda Rubin, 6–3, 7–6^{(8–6)}

=== Doubles ===
(France) Émilie Loit / (Australia) Nicole Pratt defeated (Japan) Ai Sugiyama / (Thailand) Tamarine Tanasugarn, 6–3, 6–3
