= 2001 Copa Colsanitas – Singles =

Singles
- 2001 Copa Colsanitas
- 2000 Champion: (Austria) Patricia Wartusch

Final
- Champion: (Argentina) Paola Suárez
- Runner-up: (Hungary) Rita Kuti-Kis
- Score: 6–4, 6–2

Details
- Draw: 30
- Seeds: 8

Events
Singles	Doubles
← 2000 ·	Copa Colsanitas	· 2002 →

Patricia Wartusch was the defending champion but lost in the second round to Mariana Díaz Oliva.

Paola Suárez won in the final 6–4, 6–2 against Rita Kuti-Kis.

== Seeds ==
A champion seed is indicated in bold text while text in italics indicates the round in which that seed was eliminated. The top two seeds received a bye to the second round.

1. (Argentina) **Paola Suárez (champion)**
2. (United States) Corina Morariu (second round)
3. (Spain) Ángeles Montolio (second round)
4. (Italy) Tathiana Garbin (first round)
5. (Spain) Marta Marrero (first round)
6. (Hungary) Rita Kuti-Kis (final)
7. (Austria) Sylvia Plischke (first round)
8. (Spain) Anabel Medina Garrigues (first round)

== Draw ==
=== Key ===
- Q = Qualifier
- WC = Wild card
- LL = Lucky loser
- Alt = Alternate
- SE = Special exempt
- PR = Protected ranking
- ITF = ITF entry
- JE = Junior exempt
- w/o = Walkover
- r = Retired
- d = Defaulted
- SR = Special ranking

=== Final ===
Final
1	(Argentina) **Paola Suárez**	**6**	**6**
6	(Hungary) Rita Kuti-Kis	2	4

=== Section 1 ===
First round
(Slovenia) **K Srebotnik**	**6**	6^{6}	**6**
(Germany) S Klösel	2	**7^{8}**	3
WC	(Colombia) C Giraldo	6^{3}	0
Q	(Czech Republic) **E Martincová**	**7^{7}**	**6**
(Spain) **M Sánchez Lorenzo**	**7^{7}**	**6**
5	(Spain) M Marrero	6^{3}	1
3	(Spain) **Á Montolio**	**6**	**6**
(Spain) L Domínguez Lino	2	3
WC	(Argentina) M E Salerni	**6**	4	5
(Spain) **M J Martínez**	4	**6**	**7**
(Slovakia) J Husárová	3	5
(Austria) **P Wartusch**	**6**	**7**
(Argentina) **M Díaz Oliva**	4	**6**	**6**
7	(Austria) S Plischke	**6**	4	4

Second round
1	(Argentina) **P Suárez**	4	**6**	**6**
(Slovenia) K Srebotnik	**6**	2	4
Q	(Czech Republic) **E Martincová**	**7**	**6**
(Spain) M Sánchez Lorenzo	5	4
3	(Spain) Á Montolio	4	3
(Spain) **M J Martínez**	**6**	**6**
(Austria) P Wartusch	5	6^{4}
(Argentina) **M Díaz Oliva**	**7**	**7^{7}**

Quarterfinals
1	(Argentina) **P Suárez**	**7**	**6**
Q	(Czech Republic) E Martincová	5	1
(Spain) M J Martínez	4	5
(Argentina) **M Díaz Oliva**	**6**	**7**

Semifinals
1	(Argentina) **P Suárez**	4	**7^{8}**	**6**
(Argentina) M Díaz Oliva	**6**	6^{6}	3

=== Section 2 ===
First round
8	(Spain) A Medina Garrigues	6^{5}	3
(Hungary) **K Marosi-Aracama**	**7^{7}**	**6**
Q	(Spain) M Ramón	**6**	4	3
(Germany) **E Wagner**	0	**6**	**6**
(Germany) A Barna	**6**	1	1
Q	(Argentina) **C Fernández**	2	**6**	**6**
(Spain) **C Torrens Valero**	**6**	**6**
4	(Italy) T Garbin	2	2
6	(Hungary) **R Kuti-Kis**	**6**	**6**
(Venezuela) M Sequera	3	1
Q	(Spain) **A Goñi**	**6**	4	**6**
(Poland) M Grzybowska	2	**6**	3
(Spain) N Llagostera	**6**	2	2
(Colombia) **C Castaño**	4	**6**	**6**

Second round
(Hungary) **K Marosi-Aracama**	**6**	2	**6**
(Germany) E Wagner	2	**6**	2
Q	(Argentina) C Fernández	6^{3}	**6**	2
(Spain) **C Torrens Valero**	**7^{7}**	4	**6**
6	(Hungary) **R Kuti-Kis**	**6**	**6**
Q	(Spain) A Goñi	4	2
(Colombia) **C Castaño**	**7^{7}**	4	**6**
2	(United States) C Morariu	6^{4}	**6**	3

Quarterfinals
(Hungary) K Marosi-Aracama	3	0
(Spain) **C Torrens Valero**	**6**	**6**
6	(Hungary) **R Kuti-Kis**	**6**	**6**
(Colombia) C Castaño	2	4

Semifinals
(Spain) C Torrens Valero	4	1
6	(Hungary) **R Kuti-Kis**	**6**	**6**
