= 2003 China Open – Doubles =

Doubles
- 2003 China Open

Final
- Champions: (France) Émilie Loit (Australia) Nicole Pratt
- Runners-up: (Japan) Ai Sugiyama (Thailand) Tamarine Tanasugarn
- Score: 6–3, 6–3

Events
Singles	Doubles
← 2002 ·	China Open	· 2004 →

Anna Kournikova and Janet Lee were the defending champions, but Kournikova did not compete this year. Lee teamed up with Corina Morariu and lost in quarterfinals to Ai Sugiyama and Tamarine Tanasugarn.

Émilie Loit and Nicole Pratt won the title by defeating Ai Sugiyama and Tamarine Tanasugarn 6–3, 6–3 in the final.

== Seeds ==
1. (Spain) Conchita Martínez / (Indonesia) Angelique Widjaja (semifinals)
2. (Zimbabwe) Cara Black / (Australia) Alicia Molik (first round)
3. (Hungary) Petra Mandula / (Austria) Barbara Schett (first round)
4. (Switzerland) Emmanuelle Gagliardi / (United States) Chanda Rubin (semifinals)

== Draws ==
=== Key ===
- Q = Qualifier
- WC = Wild card
- LL = Lucky loser
- Alt = Alternate
- SE = Special exempt
- PR = Protected ranking
- ITF = ITF entry
- JE = Junior exempt
- w/o = Walkover
- r = Retired
- d = Defaulted
- SR = Special ranking

=== Draw ===
First round
1	(Spain) C Martínez (Indonesia) A Widjaja	7	6
(Paraguay) R Neffa-de los Ríos (Russia) M Sharapova	5	3
(United States) A Cargill (United States) J Craybas	6	6
LL	(China) Dong Yanhua (China) Zhang Yao	3	2
3	(Hungary) P Mandula (Austria) B Schett	6^{4}	7^{10}	3
(Chinese Taipei) J Lee (United States) C Morariu	7^{7}	6^{8}	6
(Japan) A Sugiyama (Thailand) T Tanasugarn	7	6
Q	(Japan) A Nakamura (Japan) S Okamoto	5	2
(Australia) T Musgrave (United States) A Spears	3	1
(Italy) T Garbin (Italy) F Pennetta	6	6
(China) T Li (China) T Sun	4	4
4	(Switzerland) E Gagliardi (United States) C Rubin	6	6
(France) É Loit (Australia) N Pratt	5	6	6
(China) Z Yan (China) J Zheng	7	3	1
(Japan) A Morigami (Russia) D Safina	7^{8}	3	6
2	(Zimbabwe) C Black (Australia) A Molik	6^{6}	6	3

Quarterfinals
1	(Spain) C Martínez (Indonesia) A Widjaja	6	6
(United States) A Cargill (United States) J Craybas	2	4
(Chinese Taipei) J Lee (United States) C Morariu	0^{r}
(Japan) A Sugiyama (Thailand) T Tanasugarn	5
(Italy) T Garbin (Italy) F Pennetta	0	2
4	(Switzerland) E Gagliardi (United States) C Rubin	6	6
(France) É Loit (Australia) N Pratt	6	6
(Japan) A Morigami (Russia) D Safina	4	3

Semifinals
1	(Spain) C Martínez (Indonesia) A Widjaja	2	3
(Japan) A Sugiyama (Thailand) T Tanasugarn	6	6
4	(Switzerland) E Gagliardi (United States) C Rubin	6	4	3
(France) É Loit (Australia) N Pratt	3	6	6

Final
(Japan) A Sugiyama (Thailand) T Tanasugarn	3	3
(France) É Loit (Australia) N Pratt	6	6
