= 2002 Copa Colsanitas – Doubles =

Doubles
- 2002 Copa Colsanitas

Final
- Champions: (Spain) Virginia Ruano Pascual (Argentina) Paola Suárez
- Runners-up: (Slovenia) Tina Križan (Slovenia) Katarina Srebotnik
- Score: 6–2, 6–1

Details
- Draw: 16 (1WC/1Q/1LL)
- Seeds: 4

Events
| Singles | Doubles |
| ← 2001 · | Copa Colsanitas | · 2003 → |

Tathiana Garbin and Janette Husárová were the defending champions but none competed this year, as both players decided to play in Dubai at the same week.

Virginia Ruano Pascual and Paola Suárez won the title by defeating Tina Križan and Katarina Srebotnik 6–2, 6–1 in the final.

== Seeds ==
1. (Spain) Virginia Ruano Pascual / (Argentina) Paola Suárez (champions)
2. (Slovenia) Tina Križan / (Slovenia) Katarina Srebotnik (final)
3. (Argentina) Laura Montalvo / (Argentina) María Emilia Salerni (semifinals, retired)
4. (Spain) Lourdes Domínguez Lino / (France) Émilie Loit (first round)

== Draw ==
=== Key ===
- Q = Qualifier
- WC = Wild card
- LL = Lucky loser
- Alt = Alternate
- SE = Special exempt
- PR = Protected ranking
- ITF = ITF entry
- JE = Junior exempt
- w/o = Walkover
- r = Retired
- d = Defaulted
- SR = Special ranking

=== Draw ===
First round
1 | (Spain) V Ruano Pascual (Argentina) P Suárez | 6 | 5 | 6
(Bulgaria) L Bacheva (Spain) C Torrens Valero | 4 | 7 | 3
(United States) E Schmidt (Netherlands) A van Exel | 7 | 6
Q | (Italy) ME Camerin (Italy) G Casoni | 5 | 1
4 | (Spain) L Domínguez Lino (France) É Loit | 6 | 2 | 0
(Spain) E Bes (Paraguay) R de los Ríos | 1 | 6 | 6
(Croatia) M Palaveršić (Germany) C Schneider | 6 | 2 | 6
(Czech Republic) K Koukalová (Argentina) E Krauth | 3 | 6 | 2
WC | (Colombia) C Castaño (Colombia) F Zuluaga | 7 | 7^{7}
LL | (Germany) J Schruff (Germany) S Werner | 5 | 6^{3}
(Argentina) M Díaz Oliva (Romania) A Vanc | 6 | 1 | 1
3 | (Argentina) L Montalvo (Argentina) ME Salerni | 4 | 6 | 6
(Czech Republic) E Martincová (Czech Republic) A Vašková | 6 | 6
(Brazil) J Cortez (Spain) M Ramón Climent | 4 | 2
(Japan) R Fujiwara (Spain) N Llagostera Vives | 0 | 1
2 | (Slovenia) T Križan (Slovenia) K Srebotnik | 6 | 6

Quarterfinals
1 | (Spain) V Ruano Pascual (Argentina) P Suárez | 6 | 6
(United States) E Schmidt (Netherlands) A van Exel | 3 | 4
(Spain) E Bes (Paraguay) R de los Ríos | 3 | 6 | 3
(Croatia) M Palaveršić (Germany) C Schneider | 6 | 2 | 6
WC | (Colombia) C Castaño (Colombia) F Zuluaga | 6^{5} | 3
3 | (Argentina) L Montalvo (Argentina) ME Salerni | 7^{7} | 6
(Czech Republic) E Martincová (Czech Republic) A Vašková | 3 | 0
2 | (Slovenia) T Križan (Slovenia) K Srebotnik | 6 | 6

Semifinals
1 | (Spain) V Ruano Pascual (Argentina) P Suárez | 6 | 6
(Croatia) M Palaveršić (Germany) C Schneider | 1 | 2
3 | (Argentina) L Montalvo (Argentina) ME Salerni | 7 | 2^{r}
2 | (Slovenia) T Križan (Slovenia) K Srebotnik | 5 | 1

Final
1 | (Spain) V Ruano Pascual (Argentina) P Suárez | 6 | 6
2 | (Slovenia) T Križan (Slovenia) K Srebotnik | 2 | 1

== Qualifying ==
=== Seeds ===
1. (Italy) Maria Elena Camerin / (Italy) Giulia Casoni (qualified)
2. (Venezuela) Stephanie Schaer / (Russia) Galina Voskoboeva (first round)

=== Qualifiers ===
1. (Italy) Maria Elena Camerin / (Italy) Giulia Casoni

=== Lucky losers ===
1. (Germany) Julia Schruff / (Germany) Scarlett Werner

=== Qualifying draw ===
First round
1 | (Italy) Maria Elena Camerin (Italy) Giulia Casoni | 8
WC | (Spain) Cristina Cabello (Colombia) Romy Farah | 4
(Germany) Julia Schruff (Germany) Scarlett Werner | 8
2 | (Venezuela) Stephanie Schaer (Russia) Galina Voskoboeva | 4

Qualifying competition
1 | (Italy) Maria Elena Camerin (Italy) Giulia Casoni | 6 | 4 | 6
(Germany) Julia Schruff (Germany) Scarlett Werner | 3 | 6 | 4
