= 2003 Tashkent Open =

- Date: 6–12 October
- Edition: 5th
- Category: Tier IV
- Draw: 32S / 16D
- Prize money: $140,000
- Surface: Hard / outdoor
- Location: Tashkent, Uzbekistan
- Venue: Tashkent Tennis Center

Champions

Singles
- (Spain) Virginia Ruano Pascual

Doubles
- (Ukraine) Yulia Beygelzimer (Belarus) Tatiana Poutchek
- Tashkent Open

The 2003 Tashkent Open was a women's tennis tournament played on hard courts at the Tashkent Tennis Center in Tashkent, Uzbekistan that was part of the Tier IV category of the 2003 WTA Tour. It was the fifth edition of the tournament and was held from 6 October through 12 October 2003. Fourth-seeded Virginia Ruano Pascual won the singles title and earned $22,000 first-prize money.

== Finals ==
=== Singles ===
(Spain) Virginia Ruano Pascual defeated (Japan) Saori Obata, 6–2, 7–6^{(7–2)}

- It was Ruano Pascual's first singles title of her the year and the third and last of her career.

=== Doubles ===
(Ukraine) Yulia Beygelzimer / (Belarus) Tatiana Poutchek defeated (China) Li Ting / (China) Tatiana Poutchek, 6–3, 7–6^{(7–0)}
