= 2002 French Open – Women's doubles =

Women's doubles
- 2002 French Open

Final
- Champions: (Spain) Virginia Ruano Pascual (Argentina) Paola Suárez
- Runners-up: (United States) Lisa Raymond (Australia) Rennae Stubbs
- Score: 6–4, 6–2

Details
- Draw: 64 (6 WC )
- Seeds: 16

Events
Singles	men	women		boys	girls
Doubles	men	women	mixed	boys	girls
WC Singles	men	women	quad
WC Doubles	men	women	quad
Legends	−45	45+	women
← 2001 ·	French Open	· 2003 →

Virginia Ruano Pascual and Paola Suárez were the defending champions and successfully defended their title, defeating Lisa Raymond and Rennae Stubbs 6–4, 6–2 in the final.

== Seeds ==
1. (United States) Lisa Raymond / (Australia) Rennae Stubbs (final)
2. (Spain) Virginia Ruano Pascual / (Argentina) Paola Suárez (champions)
3. (Zimbabwe) Cara Black / (Russia) Elena Likhovtseva (third round)
4. (Slovakia) Daniela Hantuchová / (Spain) Arantxa Sánchez Vicario (first round)
5. (United States) Kimberly Po-Messerli / (France) Nathalie Tauziat (second round)
6. (France) Sandrine Testud / (Italy) Roberta Vinci (quarterfinals)
7. (Russia) Elena Dementieva / (Slovakia) Janette Husárová (second round, withdrew)
8. (Spain) Conchita Martínez / (Argentina) Patricia Tarabini (first round)
9. (United States) Nicole Arendt / (South Africa) Liezel Huber (semifinals)
10. (Italy) Silvia Farina Elia / (Austria) Barbara Schett (third round)
11. (Slovenia) Tina Križan / (Slovenia) Katarina Srebotnik (first round)
12. (Chinese Taipei) Janet Lee / (Indonesia) Wynne Prakusya (first round)
13. (South Africa) Amanda Coetzer / (United States) Lori McNeil (second round)
14. n/a
15. (Japan) Rika Fujiwara / (Japan) Ai Sugiyama (semifinals)
16. (France) Alexandra Fusai / (Netherlands) Caroline Vis (third round)
17. (Czech Republic) Dája Bedáňová / (Russia) Elena Bovina (third round)

== Draw ==
=== Key ===
- Q = Qualifier
- WC = Wild card
- LL = Lucky loser
- Alt = Alternate
- SE = Special exempt
- PR = Protected ranking
- ITF = ITF entry
- JE = Junior exempt
- w/o = Walkover
- r = Retired
- d = Defaulted
- SR = Special ranking

=== Finals ===
Quarterfinals
1	(United States) Lisa Raymond (Australia) Rennae Stubbs	6	6
(Japan) Shinobu Asagoe (Australia) Trudi Musgrave	0	2
15	(Japan) Rika Fujiwara (Japan) Ai Sugiyama	6	2	6
(Hungary) Petra Mandula (Austria) Patricia Wartusch	0	6	4
9	(United States) Nicole Arendt (South Africa) Liezel Huber	6	7^{8}
(Italy) Rita Grande (Switzerland) Patty Schnyder	4	6^{6}
6	(France) Sandrine Testud (Italy) Roberta Vinci	4	3
2	(Spain) Virginia Ruano Pascual (Argentina) Paola Suárez	6	6

Semifinals
1	(United States) Lisa Raymond (Australia) Rennae Stubbs	6	6^{5}	6
15	(Japan) Rika Fujiwara (Japan) Ai Sugiyama	1	7^{7}	2
9	(United States) Nicole Arendt (South Africa) Liezel Huber	0	4
2	(Spain) Virginia Ruano Pascual (Argentina) Paola Suárez	6	6

Final
1	(United States) Lisa Raymond (Australia) Rennae Stubbs	4	2
2	(Spain) Virginia Ruano Pascual (Argentina) Paola Suárez	6	6

=== Top half ===
==== Section 1 ====
First round
1	(United States) L Raymond (Australia) R Stubbs	6^{4}	6	6
WC	(United States) M Navratilova (Belarus) N Zvereva	7^{7}	3	4
(Sweden) Å Svensson (Uzbekistan) I Tulyaganova	7	7
(Paraguay) R de los Ríos (United States) L Osterloh	5	5
(Argentina) L Montalvo (Ukraine) E Tatarkova	5	6	6
WC	(France) A-L Heitz (France) É Le Bescond	7	4	3
(Slovenia) T Pisnik (United States) K Schlukebir	6	3	5
17	(Czech Republic) D Bedáňová (Russia) E Bovina	4	6	7
11	(Slovenia) T Križan (Slovenia) K Srebotnik	5	5
(Japan) S Asagoe (Australia) T Musgrave	7	7
(France) N Dechy (United States) M Tu	7	2	6
(South Africa) N de Villiers (Kazakhstan) I Selyutina	5	6	4
Alt	(Croatia) M Palaveršić (Germany) C Schneider	6^{3}	1
(Croatia) I Majoli (Australia) N Pratt	7^{7}	6
(Czech Republic) E Martincová (Belarus) N Ostrovskaya	6^{4}	3
5	(United States) K Po-Messerli (France) N Tauziat	7^{7}	6

Second round
1	(United States) L Raymond (Australia) R Stubbs	6	2	6
(Sweden) Å Svensson (Uzbekistan) I Tulyaganova	2	6	3
(Argentina) L Montalvo (Ukraine) E Tatarkova	3	2
17	(Czech Republic) D Bedáňová (Russia) E Bovina	6	6
(Japan) S Asagoe (Australia) T Musgrave	6	5	6
(France) N Dechy (United States) M Tu	4	7	4
(Croatia) I Majoli (Australia) N Pratt	6	6
5	(United States) K Po-Messerli (France) N Tauziat	4	2

Third round
1	(United States) L Raymond (Australia) R Stubbs	6	4	6
17	(Czech Republic) D Bedáňová (Russia) E Bovina	4	6	2
(Japan) S Asagoe (Australia) T Musgrave	6	7
(Croatia) I Majoli (Australia) N Pratt	3	5

Quarterfinals
1	(United States) L Raymond (Australia) R Stubbs	6	6
(Japan) S Asagoe (Australia) T Musgrave	0	2

==== Section 2 ====
First round
3	(Zimbabwe) C Black (Russia) E Likhovtseva	6	7^{7}
PR	(South Africa) S De Beer (Japan) N Miyagi	3	6^{3}
(Germany) V Henke (Germany) B Lamade	6	6
WC	(France) M Bartoli (France) T Golovin	1	4
WC	(France) É Loit (France) A Mauresmo	6	1	6
(Spain) M Marrero (Spain) MJ Martínez Sánchez	2	6	8
(Bulgaria) L Bacheva (Belarus) T Poutchek	5	1
15	(Japan) R Fujiwara (Japan) A Sugiyama	7	6
12	(Chinese Taipei) J Lee (Indonesia) W Prakusya	4	6	4
(United States) A Augustus (United States) J Embry	6	3	6
(Germany) K Freye (Japan) R Hiraki	7^{7}	3	0
(Australia) A Molik (Spain) M Serna	6^{3}	6	6
(Switzerland) E Gagliardi (Italy) F Schiavone	4	3
(Russia) G Fokina (Ukraine) T Perebiynis	6	6
(Hungary) P Mandula (Austria) P Wartusch	6	7^{8}
8	(Spain) C Martínez (Argentina) P Tarabini	1	6^{6}

Second round
3	(Zimbabwe) C Black (Russia) E Likhovtseva	6	4	6
(Germany) V Henke (Germany) B Lamade	3	6	4
(Spain) M Marrero (Spain) MJ Martínez Sánchez	4	2
15	(Japan) R Fujiwara (Japan) A Sugiyama	6	6
(United States) A Augustus (United States) J Embry	3	3
(Australia) A Molik (Spain) M Serna	6	6
(Russia) G Fokina (Ukraine) T Perebiynis	6	0	4
(Hungary) P Mandula (Austria) P Wartusch	4	6	6

Third round
3	(Zimbabwe) C Black (Russia) E Likhovtseva	6^{3}	3
15	(Japan) R Fujiwara (Japan) A Sugiyama	7^{7}	6
(Australia) A Molik (Spain) M Serna	3	6	3
(Hungary) P Mandula (Austria) P Wartusch	6	2	6

Quarterfinals
15	(Japan) R Fujiwara (Japan) A Sugiyama	6	2	6
(Hungary) P Mandula (Austria) P Wartusch	0	6	4

=== Bottom half ===
==== Section 3 ====
First round
7	(Russia) E Dementieva (Slovakia) J Husárová	6	3	6
(United States) A Frazier (United Kingdom) L Woodroffe	3	6	3
(Italy) T Garbin (Indonesia) A Widjaja	6	7
(Belgium) L Courtois (Netherlands) A Hopmans	0	5
(Australia) E Dominikovic (United States) M Irvin	6	6
WC	(France) S Cohen-Aloro (France) V Razzano	1	4
(Belgium) E Callens (United States) C Rubin	3	5
9	(United States) N Arendt (South Africa) L Huber	6	7
13	(South Africa) A Coetzer (United States) L McNeil	6	6
(Ukraine) Y Beygelzimer (Russia) A Rodionova	3	3
(Czech Republic) L Němečková (Romania) A Vanc	7^{7}	3	3
(Italy) R Grande (Switzerland) P Schnyder	6^{4}	6	6
(Slovenia) M Matevžič (Federal Republic of Yugoslavia) D Zarić	6	6
(Italy) Ad Serra Zanetti (Italy) An Serra Zanetti	2	3
(Germany) B Rittner (Venezuela) M Vento-Kabchi	6	6
4	(Slovakia) D Hantuchová (Spain) A Sánchez Vicario	3	4

Second round
7	(Russia) E Dementieva (Slovakia) J Husárová
(Italy) T Garbin (Indonesia) A Widjaja	w/o
(Australia) E Dominikovic (United States) M Irvin	6^{2}	4
9	(United States) N Arendt (South Africa) L Huber	7^{7}	6
13	(South Africa) A Coetzer (United States) L McNeil	6	3	5
(Italy) R Grande (Switzerland) P Schnyder	4	6	7
(Slovenia) M Matevžič (Federal Republic of Yugoslavia) D Zarić	6	7
(Germany) B Rittner (Venezuela) M Vento-Kabchi	3	5

Third round
(Italy) T Garbin (Indonesia) A Widjaja	6^{2}	6	4
9	(United States) N Arendt (South Africa) L Huber	7^{7}	4	6
(Italy) R Grande (Switzerland) P Schnyder	6	6
(Slovenia) M Matevžič (Federal Republic of Yugoslavia) D Zarić	3	3

Quarterfinals
9	(United States) N Arendt (South Africa) L Huber	6	7^{8}
(Italy) R Grande (Switzerland) P Schnyder	4	6^{6}

==== Section 4 ====
First round
6	(France) S Testud (Italy) R Vinci	1	7	6
(Australia) C Barclay (Australia) C Wheeler	6	5	2
(Thailand) T Tanasugarn (Canada) V Webb	2	7	9
(Australia) R McQuillan (Australia) L McShea	6	5	7
(South Africa) N Grandin (Netherlands) A van Exel	3	2
(Netherlands) K Boogert (Netherlands) M Oremans	6	6
(South Africa) K Grant (United States) A Spears	6	0	3
10	(Italy) S Farina Elia (Austria) B Schett	3	6	6
16	(France) A Fusai (Netherlands) C Vis	6	6
(United Kingdom) J Pullin (Germany) M Weingärtner	1	3
(Spain) E Bes (Spain) L Domínguez Lino	6	7
(Czech Republic) K Hrdličková (Slovakia) H Nagyová	4	5
(United States) S Reeves (South Africa) J Steck	4	6^{6}
WC	(France) C Dhenin (France) S Foretz	6	7^{8}
(Argentina) C Fernández (Argentina) ME Salerni	2	4
2	(Spain) V Ruano Pascual (Argentina) P Suárez	6	6

Second round
6	(France) S Testud (Italy) R Vinci	7^{7}	6
(Thailand) T Tanasugarn (Canada) V Webb	6^{2}	1
(Netherlands) K Boogert (Netherlands) M Oremans	4	5
10	(Italy) S Farina Elia (Austria) B Schett	6	7
16	(France) A Fusai (Netherlands) C Vis	6	6
(Spain) E Bes (Spain) L Domínguez Lino	1	0
WC	(France) C Dhenin (France) S Foretz	1	1
2	(Spain) V Ruano Pascual (Argentina) P Suárez	6	6

Third round
6	(France) S Testud (Italy) R Vinci	6	7^{9}
10	(Italy) S Farina Elia (Austria) B Schett	4	6^{7}
16	(France) A Fusai (Netherlands) C Vis	1	0
2	(Spain) V Ruano Pascual (Argentina) P Suárez	6	6

Quarterfinals
6	(France) S Testud (Italy) R Vinci	4	3
2	(Spain) V Ruano Pascual (Argentina) P Suárez	6	6
