= Mariana Correa =

Ecuadorian tennis player

- Country (sports): Ecuador
- Born: 4 November 1984 (age 40); Miami, Florida, United States
- Plays: Right-handed
- Prize money: $32,584

Singles
- Career record: 116–172
- Career titles: 0
- Highest ranking: No. 558 (27 February 2006)

Doubles
- Career record: 72–133
- Career titles: 3 ITF
- Highest ranking: No. 501 (24 December 2001)

Mariana Correa (born 4 November 1984) is an Ecuadorian former professional tennis player.

== Biography ==
Although born in Miami, Correa mostly grew up in Ecuador's capital Quito, where she moved as a child in 1992. She is a dual citizen of both Ecuador and the United States. As a junior she attained a highest ranking of 26 in the world.

Correa, a right-handed player, made her WTA Tour main draw debut at the 2002 Copa Colsanitas in Bogotá, winning her way through qualifying, before being beaten in the first round by María Sánchez Lorenzo.

Originally retiring from the tour in 2006, she has since made multiple comebacks.

In 2010, she featured in five Fed Cup ties for Ecuador and won all three of her singles matches, as well as three of her four doubles rubbers.

== ITF finals ==
$15,000 tournaments
$10,000 tournaments

=== Singles (0–1) ===
| Result | No. | Date | Tournament | Surface | Opponent | Score |
|---|---|---|---|---|---|---|
| Loss | 1. | 13 February 2006 | San Cristóbal de las Casas, Mexico | Hard | (Austria) Petra Russegger | 3–6, 2–6 |

=== Doubles (3–3) ===
| Result | No. | Date | Tournament | Surface | Partner | Opponents | Score |
|---|---|---|---|---|---|---|---|
| Loss | 1. | 25 November 2001 | Cali, Colombia | Clay | (Colombia) Romy Farah | (Brazil) Livia Azzi (Brazil) Maria Fernanda Alves | 5–7, 1–6 |
| Win | 1. | 30 August 2004 | Mexico City | Hard | (United States) Lauren Barnikow | (Mexico) Melissa Torres Sandoval (Mexico) Marcela Arroyo | 7–6^{(7)}, 7–5 |
| Win | 2. | 30 November 2009 | Havana, Cuba | Hard | (Russia) Angelina Gabueva | (Austria) Lisa Summerer (Austria) Janina Toljan | 6–2, 7–6^{(6)} |
| Win | 3. | 14 December 2009 | Quito, Ecuador | Clay | (Chile) Andrea Koch Benvenuto | (Ecuador) Alejandra Álvarez (Ecuador) Marie Elise Casares | 7–6^{(3)}, 6–2 |
| Loss | 2. | 25 June 2011 | Alcobaça, Portugal | Hard | (United States) Danielle Mills | (Australia) Alenka Hubacek (Denmark) Malou Ejdesgaard | 2–6, 5–7 |
| Loss | 3. | 7 October 2017 | Villa del Dique, Argentina | Clay | (Brazil) Flávia Guimarães Bueno | (Chile) Fernanda Brito (Paraguay) Camila Giangreco Campiz | 3–6, 3–6 |
