= Vanesa Krauth =

Argentine tennis player

- Country (sports): Argentina
- Residence: Luján, Argentina
- Born: 20 May 1981 (age 44) Luján, Argentina
- Turned pro: 1998
- Retired: 2002
- Plays: Right-handed (double-handed backhand)
- Prize money: $32,222

Singles
- Career record: 74–62
- Career titles: 0 WTA, 2 ITF
- Highest ranking: No. 223 (18 March 2002)

Grand Slam singles results
- Australian Open: Q1 (2002)

Doubles
- Career record: 85–42
- Career titles: 10 ITF
- Highest ranking: No. 174 (4 February 2002)

Vanesa Krauth (born 20 May 1981) is an Argentine former tennis player.

In her career, Krauth won two singles and nine doubles titles on the ITF Women's Circuit. She has career-high WTA rankings of 223 in singles, achieved on 18 March 2002, and 174 in doubles, set on 4 February 2002.

She made her main-draw debut on the WTA Tour at the 2001 Copa Colsanitas, in the doubles event, partnering twin sister Erica Krauth.

Krauth retired from professional tennis 2002.

== ITF finals ==
=== Singles (2–3) ===
Legend $100,000 tournaments $75,000 tournaments $50,000 tournaments $25,000 tournaments $10,000 tournaments	Finals by surface Hard (0–1) Clay (2–2) Grass (0–0) Carpet (0–0)

Result	No.	Date	Tournament	Surface	Opponent	Score
Loss	1.	27 March 2000	Pontevedra, Spain	Hard	(Spain) Ana Salas Lozano	1–6, 4–6
Loss	2.	17 April 2000	San Severo, Italy	Clay	(Argentina) María Emilia Salerni	4–6, 1–6
Win	1.	8 May 2000	Tortosa, Spain	Clay	(Spain) Ana Salas Lozano	2–6, 6–3, 6–1
Win	2.	3 July 2001	Stuttgart-Vaihingen, Germany	Clay	(Slovakia) Gabriela Voleková	6–1, 6–3
Loss	3.	10 September 2001	Reggio Calabria, Italy	Clay	(Spain) Ainhoa Goñi	2–6, 1–6

=== Doubles (10–9) ===
Legend $100,000 tournaments $75,000 tournaments $50,000 tournaments $25,000 tournaments $10,000 tournaments	Finals by surface Hard (2–0) Clay (8–9) Grass (0–0) Carpet (0–0)

Result	No.	Date	Tournament	Surface	Partner	Opponents	Score
Win	1.	14 June 1999	ITF Lenzerheide, Switzerland	Clay	(Argentina) Julie de Roo	(Switzerland) Laura Bao (Switzerland) Marylène Losey	6–3, 6–1
Loss	1.	2 August 1999	Bella Cup Toruń, Poland	Clay	(Poland) Patrycja Bandurowska	(Czech Republic) Petra Kučová (Czech Republic) Gabriela Chmelinová	4–6, 3–6
Win	2.	20 September 1999	ITF Lecce, Italy	Clay	(Argentina) Erica Krauth	(Italy) Flavia Pennetta (Italy) Roberta Vinci	1–6, 7–6^{(7–5)}, 6–1
Win	3.	27 March 2000	ITF Pontevedra, Spain	Hard	(Netherlands) Natasha Galouza	(United Kingdom) Helen Crook (United Kingdom) Victoria Davies	6–3, 2–6, 6–2
Win	4.	1 May 2000	ITF Bari, Italy	Clay	(Switzerland) Aliénor Tricerri	(Argentina) Natalia Gussoni (Argentina) Sabrina Valenti	7–5, 6–4
Win	5.	8 May 2000	ITF Tortosa, Spain	Clay	(Argentina) Erica Krauth	(Germany) Barbara Rosenberger (Switzerland) Lucia Tallo	6–3, 7–5
Win	6.	15 May 2000	ITF Barcelona, Spain	Clay	(Argentina) Erica Krauth	(Spain) Rocio Gonzalez (Spain) Rosa Maria Sitja	7–6^{(8–6)}, 6–3
Loss	2.	19 June 2000	ITF Alkmaar, Netherlands	Clay	(Argentina) Erica Krauth	(South Africa) Mareze Joubert (Australia) Nicole Sewell	w/o
Loss	3.	21 August 2000	ITF Maribor, Slovenia	Clay	(Switzerland) Aliénor Tricerri	(Germany) Angelika Rösch (Germany) Jasmin Woehr	4–6, 6–4, 6–7^{(1–7)}
Win	7.	16 October 2000	ITF Chieti, İtaly	Clay	(Argentina) Erica Krauth	(Romania) Oana Elena Golimbioschi (Romania) Andreea Ehritt-Vanc	4–5^{(5–7)}, 4–1, 4–2, 4–1
Win	8.	6 November 2000	ITF Granada, Spain	Clay	(Argentina) Erica Krauth	(Serbia and Montenegro) Branka Bojović (Spain) Conchita Martínez Granados	4–0, 4–2, 4–1
Win	9.	20 November 2000	ITF Mallorca, Spain	Clay	(Argentina) Erica Krauth	(Federal Republic of Yugoslavia) Dragana Ilić (Slovakia) Alena Paulenková	4–0, 4–0
Loss	4.	27 November 2000	ITF Mallorca, Spain	Clay	(Argentina) Erica Krauth	(Czech Republic) Gabriela Chmelinová (Czech Republic) Lenka Novotná	1–4, 2–4, 3–5
Loss	5.	2 April 2001	ITF Juárez, Mexico	Clay	(Argentina) Erica Krauth	(Spain) Alicia Ortuño (Venezuela) Milagros Sequera	4–6, 6–2, 2–6
Win	10.	16 April 2001	ITF Coatzacoalcos, Mexico	Hard	(Argentina) Erica Krauth	(Argentina) Eugenia Chialvo (Spain) Conchita Martínez Granados	6–1, 6–4
Loss	6.	18 June 2001	ITF Lenzerheide, Switzerland	Clay	(Argentina) Erica Krauth	(Germany) Kirstin Freye (Slovakia) Zuzana Váleková	6–3, 3–6, 2–6
Loss	7.	17 September 2001	ITF Tbilisi, Georgia	Clay	(Argentina) Erica Krauth	(Australia) Anastasia Rodionova (Austria) Patricia Wartusch	2–6, 1–6
Loss	8.	8 October 2001	ITF Hallandale Beach, United States	Clay	(Argentina) Erica Krauth	(Russia) Alina Jidkova (United States) Jessica Steck	6–4, 2–6, 3–6
Loss	9.	29 September 2002	ITF Raleigh, United States	Clay	(Argentina) Erica Krauth	(United States) Michelle Dasso (United States) Julie Ditty	6–7^{(4–7)}, 3–6
