= 2003 China Open – Singles =

Singles
- 2003 China Open

Final
- Champions: (Russia) Elena Dementieva
- Runners-up: (United States) Chanda Rubin
- Score: 6–3, 7–6^{(8–6)}

Details
- Seeds: 8

Events
Singles	Doubles
← 2002 ·	China Open	· 2004 →

Anna Smashnova was the defending champion, but chose not to participate this year.

Top seed Elena Dementieva won the title, defeating Chanda Rubin in the final, 6–3, 7–6^{(8–6)}.

== Seeds ==
The top four seeds received a bye into the second round.

1. (Russia) Elena Dementieva (champion)
2. (United States) Chanda Rubin (final)
3. (Japan) Ai Sugiyama (semifinals)
4. (Spain) Conchita Martínez (second round)
5. (Federal Republic of Yugoslavia) Jelena Dokic (second round, retired)
6. (Australia) Alicia Molik (quarterfinals)
7. (France) Émilie Loit (first round)
8. (Zimbabwe) Cara Black (first round)

== Draw ==
=== Key ===
- Q = Qualifier
- WC = Wild card
- LL = Lucky loser
- Alt = Alternate
- ITF = ITF entry
- PR = Protected ranking
- SR = Special ranking
- SE = Special exempt
- JE = Junior exempt
- JR = Junior Accelerator Programme entrant
- CO = College Accelerator Programme entrant
- NG = Next Gen Accelerator Program entrant
- w/o = Walkover
- r = Retired
- d = Defaulted

=== Finals ===
Semifinals
1	(Russia) Elena Dementieva	6	3	6
3	(Japan) Ai Sugiyama	1	6	3
(Japan) Akiko Morigami	0	7	3
2	(United States) Chanda Rubin	6	5	6

Final
1	(Russia) Elena Dementieva	6	7^{8}
2	(United States) Chanda Rubin	3	6^{6}

=== Top half ===
First round
(Indonesia) A Widjaja	7	2	2
(Hungary) P Mandula	5	6	6
(Australia) N Pratt	4	3
(Spain) M Sánchez Lorenzo	6	6
(Russia) M Sharapova	6	6^{3}	6
(France) É Loit	3	7^{7}	3
Q	(Italy) T Garbin	5	3^{r}
WC	(China) T Sun	7	2
(Russia) D Safina	6	7
(Switzerland) E Gagliardi	3	5
Q	(Federal Republic of Yugoslavia) J Janković	6^{6}	4^{r}
5	(Federal Republic of Yugoslavia) J Dokic	7^{8}	4

Second round
1	(Russia) E Dementieva	6	7^{7}
(Hungary) P Mandula	3	6^{1}
(Spain) M Sánchez Lorenzo	6	3	4
(Russia) M Sharapova	4	6	6
3	(Japan) A Sugiyama	7^{9}	6
WC	(China) T Sun	6^{7}	4
(Russia) D Safina	6	6
5	(Federal Republic of Yugoslavia) J Dokic	1	4

Quarterfinals
1	(Russia) E Dementieva	6	7^{7}
(Russia) M Sharapova	4	6^{4}
3	(Japan) A Sugiyama	6	7^{9}
(Russia) D Safina	4	6^{7}

Semifinals
1	(Russia) E Dementieva	6	3	6
3	(Japan) A Sugiyama	1	6	3

=== Bottom half ===
First round
6	(Australia) A Molik	6	6
(Italy) F Pennetta	3	2
LL	(United States) J Craybas	3	7^{8}	2
WC	(China) J Zheng	6	6^{6}	0^{r}
(Japan) A Morigami	6	6
Q	(Slovakia) M Suchá	2	3
(Zimbabwe) C Black	1	4
(United States) A Harkleroad	6	6
(South Korea) Y-j Cho	0	2
(Germany) A Barna	6	6
(Austria) B Schett	6	6
Q	(Paraguay) R Neffa-de los Ríos	3	1

Second round
6	(Australia) A Molik	6	6
LL	(United States) J Craybas	4	3
(Japan) A Morigami	7	6
4	(Spain) C Martínez	5	0
(United States) A Harkleroad	0	4
(Germany) A Barna	6	6
(Austria) B Schett	6^{1}	2
2	(United States) C Rubin	7^{7}	6

Quarterfinals
6	(Australia) A Molik	6^{3}	5
(Japan) A Morigami	7^{7}	7
(Germany) A Barna	1	4
2	(United States) C Rubin	6	6

Semifinals
(Japan) A Morigami	0	7	3
2	(United States) C Rubin	6	5	6
