= Céline Beigbeder =

French tennis player

- Country (sports): France
- Born: 25 February 1975 (age 50); Bayonne, France
- Height: 1.70 m (5 ft 7 in)
- Retired: 2005
- Plays: Right-handed
- Prize money: $149,062

Singles
- Career record: 128–89
- Career titles: 9 ITF
- Highest ranking: No. 84 (15 April 2002)

Grand Slam singles results
- Australian Open: 1R (2002)
- French Open: 1R (2001, 2002, 2003)
- Wimbledon: 1R (2002)

Doubles
- Career record: 6–5
- Career titles: 1 ITF
- Highest ranking: –

Céline Beigbeder (born 25 February 1975) is a former professional tennis player from France.

== Biography ==
Beigbeder was born in Bayonne in south-western France, the daughter of Jean-Pierre and Nicole. The highlights of her junior career include winning the French national championships in 1993 and making the Orange Bowl quarterfinals in 1994. Her coach and educator was Jean Michel Etchebarne. Finishing school in 1994, she competed for several years on the ITF Women's Circuit.

It wasn't until 2001, aged 26, that she committed to professional tennis full-time. At her first WTA Tour tournament, the 2001 Internationaux de Strasbourg, she made it into the main draw as a qualifier and reached the semifinals, with wins over Tamarine Tanasugarn, Sarah Pitkowski and Ai Sugiyama. She was granted a wildcard into the 2001 French Open and was beaten in the first round by Elena Dementieva. Her five ITF titles in 2001 included two $50k events as well as a win over Jelena Janković en route to the title at Lenzerheide. By the end of the year, her ranking had risen to No. 101 in the world.

In 2002, she broke into the world's top 100, peaking at No. 84 in April, with main-draw appearances at the Australian Open, French Open and in Wimbledon. She was a quarterfinalist that year at both the Copa Colsanitas and Palermo Ladies Open.

== ITF finals ==
Legend
$50,000 tournaments
$25,000 tournaments
$10,000 tournaments

=== Singles (9–2) ===
Result	No.	Date	Tournament	Surface	Opponent	Score
Loss	1	15 November 1998	ITF Le Havre, France	Clay (i)	(France) Stéphanie Foretz	6–1, 4–6, 3–6
Win	2	13 August 2000	ITF Périgueux, France	Clay	(France) Virginie Pichet	6–1, 6–1
Win	3	22 April 2001	ITF Gelos, France	Clay	(France) Laurence Andretto	6–2, 6–2
Win	4	24 June 2001	ITF Lenzerheide, Switzerland	Clay	(Netherlands) Anousjka van Exel	6–3, 6–0
Win	5	1 July 2001	ITF Mont-de-Marsan, France	Clay	(Germany) Angelika Rösch	6–1, 6–1
Win	6	5 August 2001	Open Saint-Gaudens, France	Clay	(Ukraine) Julia Vakulenko	6–4, 6–1
Win	7	September 2001	Open Denain, France	Clay	(Bulgaria) Lubomira Bacheva	6–4, 6–0
Win	8	July 2002	ITF Mont-de-Marsan, France	Clay	(Ukraine) Alexandra Kravets	7–5, 6–1
Loss	9	June 2003	ITF Perigueux, France	Clay	(Spain) Anabel Medina Garrigues	1–6, 2–6
Win	10	August 2003	ITF San Marino	Clay	(France) Kildine Chevalier	6–3, 6–1
Win	11	November 2003	ITF Villenave-d'Ornon, France	Clay (i)	(Austria) Bettina Pirker	6–1, 6–1

=== Doubles (1–0) ===
Result	No.	Date	Tournament	Surface	Partner	Opponents	Score
Win	1	October 2003	ITF Carcavelos, Portugal	Clay	(Spain) Rosa María Andrés Rodríguez	(Colombia) Romy Farah (Portugal) Neuza Silva	6–2, 1–0 ret.
