= Ainhoa Goñi =

Spanish tennis player (born 1979)

- Full name: Ainhoa Goñi Blanco
- Country (sports): Spain
- Born: 7 August 1979 (age 47) Madrid, Spain
- Turned pro: 1998
- Retired: 2005
- Plays: Right-handed (two-handed backhand)
- Prize money: $99,303

Singles
- Career record: 173–121
- Career titles: 6 ITF
- Highest ranking: 140 (5 November 2001)

Grand Slam singles results
- Australian Open: Q2 (2000)
- French Open: Q3 (2000)
- US Open: Q1 (1999, 2000, 2001, 2002, 2004)

Doubles
- Career record: 46–69
- Career titles: 1 ITF
- Highest ranking: 222 (4 December 2000)

Ainhoa Goñi Blanco (born 7 August 1979) is a former professional tennis player from Spain.

Goñi won six singles titles and one doubles title on the ITF Circuit in her career. On 5 November 2001, she reached her best singles ranking of world No. 140. On 4 December 2000, she peaked at No. 222 in the doubles rankings.

She made her WTA Tour main-draw debut at the 2001 Copa Colsanitas, in the doubles event partnering Nuria Llagostera Vives, after coming through the qualifying rounds.

Goñi retired from professional tennis in 2005.

== ITF Circuit finals ==
$50,000 tournaments
$25,000 tournaments
$10,000 tournaments

=== Singles: 7 (6–1) ===
Result	Date	Tournament	Tier	Surface	Opponent	Score
Win	3 August 1998	ITF Périgueux, France	10,000	Clay	(France) Stéphanie Foretz	6–0, 6–4
Win	21 September 1998	ITF Lecce, Italy	10,000	Clay	(Belgium) Evy Last	4–6, 6–3, 7–5
Loss	29 January 2001	ITF Mallorca, Spain	10,000	Clay	(Czech Republic) Veronika Raimrová	1–6, 6–2, 2–6
Win	9 July 2001	ITF Darmstadt, Germany	25,000	Clay	(Germany) Scarlett Werner	6–7^{(1–7)}, 6–4, 6–1
Win	10 September 2001	ITF Reggio Calabria, Italy	25,000	Clay	(Argentina) Vanesa Krauth	6–2, 6–1
Win	17 September 2001	ITF Lecce, Italy	25,000	Clay	(Slovakia) Ľubomíra Kurhajcová	6–4, 6–0
Win	23 June 2002	ITF Gorizia, Italy	25,000	Clay	(Croatia) Karolina Šprem	7–6^{(7–4)}, 6–1

=== Doubles: 2 (1–1) ===
Result	Date	Tournament	Tier	Surface	Partner	Opponents	Score
Loss	20 October 1997	ITF Ceuta, Spain	10,000	Hard	(Spain) Yaiza Goñi	(Spain) Patricia Aznar (Spain) Alicia Ortuño	w/o
Win	23 October 2000	ITF Saint-Raphaël, France	25,000	Hard (i)	(Spain) Nuria Llagostera Vives	(France) Kildine Chevalier (Netherlands) Susanne Trik	4–1, 5–4^{(7–5)}, 3–1 ret.
