= Stéphanie Foretz =

French tennis player

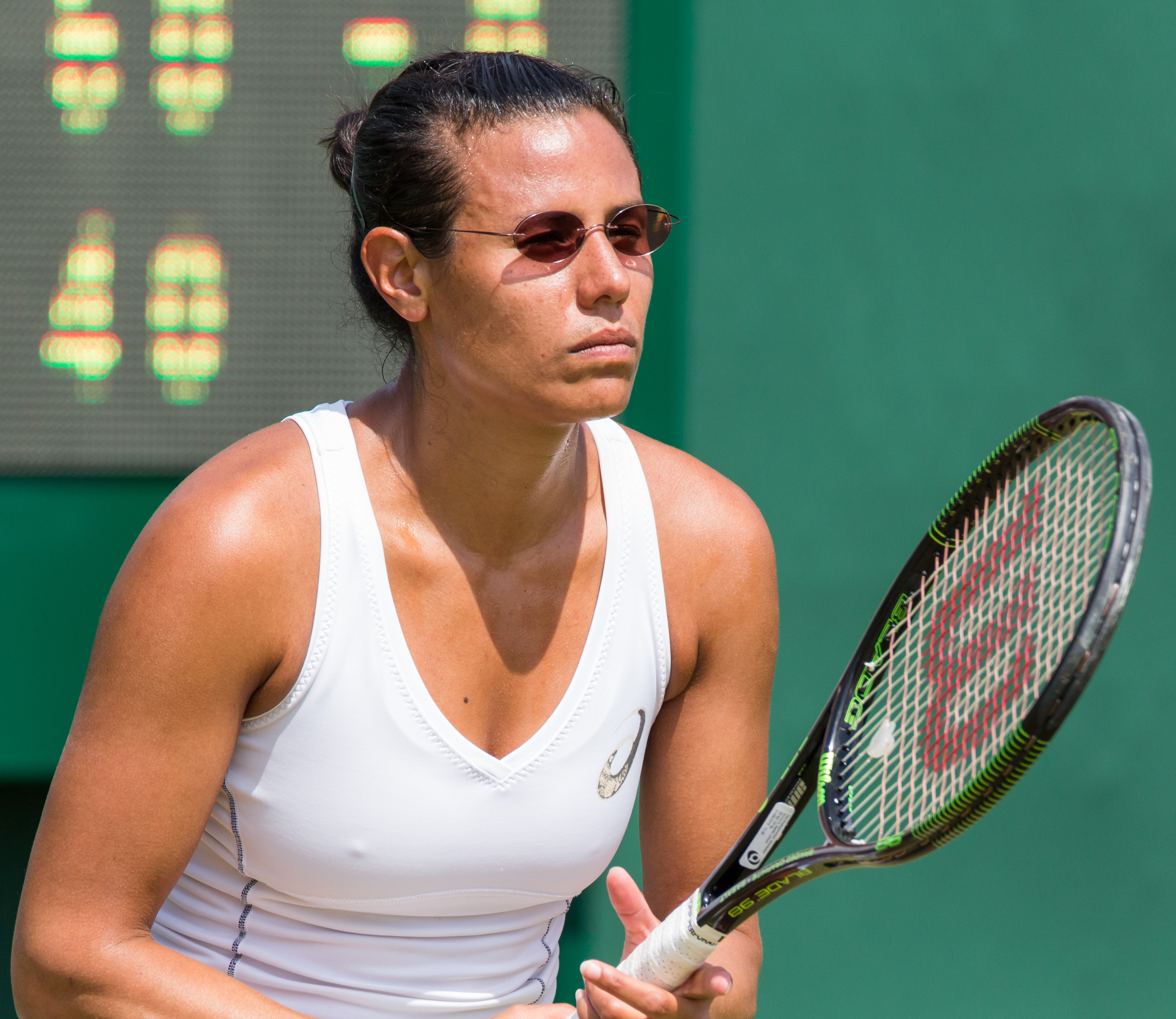
- Country (sports): France
- Residence: Boulogne-Billancourt, France
- Born: 3 May 1981 (age 44); Issy-les-Moulineaux, France
- Height: 1.66 m (5 ft 5 1/2 in)
- Turned pro: 1997
- Plays: Right-handed (two-handed backhand)
- Prize money: $1,881,212

Singles
- Career record: 570–455
- Career titles: 9 ITF
- Highest ranking: No. 62 (24 February 2003)

Grand Slam singles results
- Australian Open: 2R (2003, 2012, 2013)
- French Open: 2R (2000, 2003, 2004, 2012)
- Wimbledon: 2R (2004, 2005, 2012)
- US Open: 3R (2002)

Doubles
- Career record: 251–239
- Career titles: 16 ITF
- Highest ranking: No. 42 (19 May 2008)

Grand Slam doubles results
- Australian Open: 3R (2006)
- French Open: 2R (2000, 2002, 2007)
- Wimbledon: 2R (2007, 2012, 2013)
- US Open: QF (2007)

Team competitions
- Fed Cup: 2–1

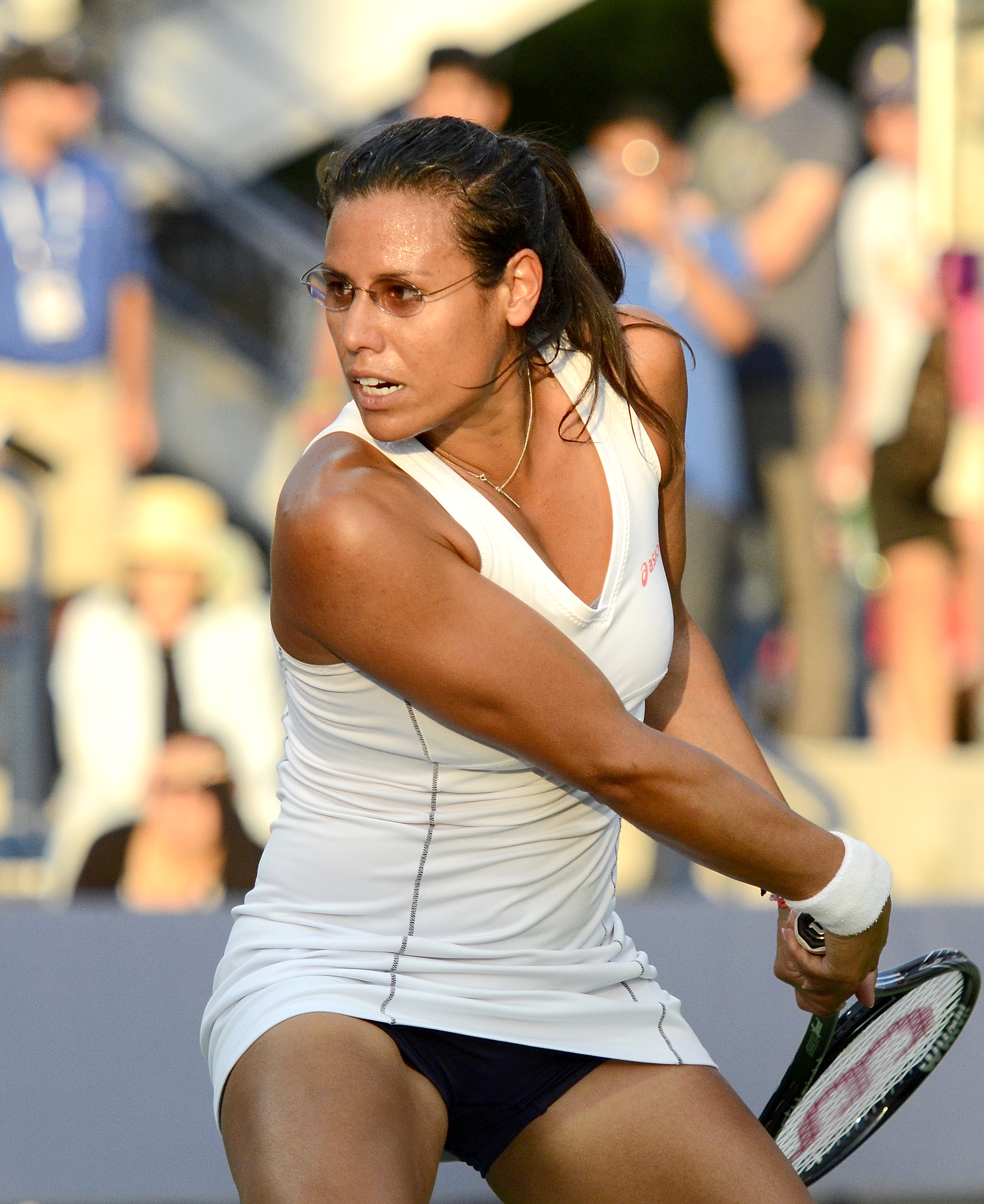
2014 US Open

Stéphanie Foretz (born 3 May 1981) is a professional tennis player from France.

Foretz won nine singles and 16 doubles titles on the ITF Women's Circuit. On 24 February 2003, she reached her career-high singles ranking of world No. 62. On 19 May 2008, she peaked at No. 42 in the doubles rankings.

Foretz was an accomplished junior player, having reached the final of the girls' tournament at the 1999 French Open. She also was selected to play for the Boston Lobsters in the 2009 World TeamTennis pro league.

In 2010, Foretz married Benoît Gacon and began competing under the name Stéphanie Foretz Gacon. In 2014, however, she reverted to her maiden name as Stéphanie Foretz.

== WTA Tour finals ==
=== Doubles: 2 (2 runner-ups) ===
Legend: Before 2009	Legend: Starting in 2009
Tier I (0–0)	Premier M (0–0)
Tier II (0–1)	Premier 5 (0–0)
Tier III (0–0)	Premier (0–0)
Tier IV & V (0–0)	International (0–1)

Result	W–L	Date	Tournament	Surface	Partner	Opponents	Score
Loss	0–1	Feb 2006	Antwerp, Belgium	Carpet (i)	(Netherlands) Michaëlla Krajicek	(Russia) Dinara Safina (Slovenia) Katarina Srebotnik	1–6, 1–6
Loss	0–2	May 2009	Strasbourg, France	Clay	(France) Claire Feuerstein	(France) Nathalie Dechy (Italy) Mara Santangelo	0–6, 1–6

== ITF finals ==
Legend
$100,000 tournaments
$75,000 tournaments
$50,000 tournaments
$25,000 tournaments
$10,000 tournaments

=== Singles (9–20) ===
Outcome	No.	Date	Tournament	Surface	Opponent	Score
Runner-up	1.	3 August 1998	ITF Périgueux, France	Clay	(Spain) Ainhoa Goñi	0–6, 4–6
Runner-up	2.	25 October 1998	Open de Touraine, France	Hard (i)	(France) Amélie Cocheteux	1–6, 1–6
Winner	3.	15 November 1998	ITF Le Havre, France	Clay	(France) Céline Beigbeder	1–6, 6–4, 6–3
Runner-up	4.	28 March 1999	ITF Dinan, France	Clay (i)	(Bulgaria) Lubomira Bacheva	2–6, 6–2, 1–6
Runner-up	5.	12 September 1999	ITF Denain, France	Clay	(Bulgaria) Lubomira Bacheva	4–6, 1–6
Winner	6.	3 July 2000	ITF Mont-de-Marsan, France	Clay	(Madagascar) Dally Randriantefy	6–2, 6–3
Winner	7.	3 May 2004	ITF Catania, Italy	Clay	(Germany) Kathrin Wörle-Scheller	6–4, 6–7^{(2)}, 6–2
Runner-up	8.	16 May 2004	Open Saint-Gaudens, France	Clay	(Russia) Maria Kirilenko	6–7^{(2)}, 3–6
Winner	9.	24 April 2005	Open de Valencia, Spain	Clay	(Italy) Anna Floris	6–3, 6–0
Winner	10.	13 September 2005	ITF Bordeaux, France	Clay	(Russia) Lioudmila Skavronskaia	6–1, 6–2
Runner-up	11.	4 September 2006	Open Denain, France	Clay	(Switzerland) Romina Oprandi	3–6, 6–4, 3–6
Winner	12.	1 October 2006	ITF Biella, Italy	Clay	(Italy) Tathiana Garbin	7–5, 3–1 ret.
Winner	13.	16 October 2006	Open Saint-Raphaël, France	Carpet (i)	(France) Youlia Fedossova	7–6^{(5)}, 6–7^{(4)}, 6–1
Runner-up	14.	5 August 2007	ITF Rimini, Italy	Clay	(Switzerland) Emmanuelle Gagliardi	3–6, 6–7^{(5)}
Runner-up	15.	21 October 2007	Open Saint-Raphaël, France	Hard (i)	(Italy) Alberta Brianti	4–6, 4–6
Runner-up	16.	15 June 2008	Open de Marseille, France	Clay	(Belgium) Kirsten Flipkens	6–7^{(4)}, 2–6
Runner-up	17.	20 July 2008	Contrexéville Open, France	Clay	(Romania) Raluca Olaru	4–6, 2–6
Runner-up	18.	12 October 2008	Open de Touraine, France	Hard (i)	(France) Julie Coin	6–7^{(7)}, 6–7^{(3)}
Runner-up	19.	3 October 2009	ITF Helsinki, Finland	Hard (i)	(Russia) Ksenia Pervak	4–6, 2–6
Runner-up	20.	9 January 2011	Blossom Cup, China	Hard	(China) Lu Jingjing	6–3, 6–7^{(2)}, 3–6
Runner-up	21.	6 March 2011	ITF Hammond, United States	Hard	(United States) Madison Brengle	3–6, 3–6
Runner-up	22.	18 April 2011	Dothan Classic, United States	Clay	(Hungary) Melinda Czink	2–6, 3–6
Runner-up	23.	28 June 2011	Bella Cup, Poland	Clay	(United States) Edina Gallovits-Hall	4–6, 3–6
Runner-up	24.	11 July 2011	Contrexéville Open, France	Clay	(France) Iryna Brémond	4–6, 7–6^{(1)}, 2–6
Runner-up	25.	8 September 2013	Trabzon Cup, Turkey	Hard	(Serbia) Aleksandra Krunić	6–1, 4–6, 3–6
Winner	26.	13 July 2014	ITF Gatineau, Canada	Hard	(Canada) Françoise Abanda	6–3, 3–6, 6–3
Runner-up	27.	20 July 2014	Challenger de Granby, Canada	Hard	(Japan) Miharu Imanishi	4–6, 4–6
Winner	28.	9 November 2014	ITF Équeurdreville, France	Hard (i)	(Ukraine) Anhelina Kalinina	5–2 ret.
Runner-up	29.	12 June 2016	Surbiton Trophy, UK	Grass	(Russia) Marina Melnikova	3–6, 6–7^{(6)}

=== Doubles (16–15) ===
Outcome	No.	Date	Location	Surface	Partner	Opponents	Score
Runner-up	1.	15 November 1998	Le Havre, France	Clay	(France) Chloé Carlotti	(Belgium) Cindy Schuurmans (Uzbekistan) Iroda Tulyaganova	2–6, 5–7
Runner-up	2.	20 March 2000	Taranto, Italy	Clay	(Italy) Antonella Serra Zanetti	(Spain) Eva Bes (Spain) Gisela Riera	7–6^{(2)}, 2–6, 2–6
Runner-up	3.	9 April 2000	Dinan, France	Clay (i)	(Belgium) Patty Van Acker	(Germany) Vanessa Henke (Germany) Syna Schmidle	7–6^{(2)}, 4–6, 2–6
Winner	4.	3 May 2004	Catania, Italy	Clay	(France) Virginie Razzano	(Ukraine) Mariya Koryttseva (Belarus) Nadejda Ostrovskaya	6–2, 6–1
Winner	5.	19 April 2005	Valencia, Spain	Hard	(France) Kildine Chevalier	(Spain) Rosa María Andrés Rodríguez (Spain) Arantxa Parra Santonja	4–6, 7–6^{(5)}, 6–2
Winner	6.	11 September 2006	Bordeaux, France	Clay	(Germany) Julia Schruff	(Hungary) Kira Nagy (Germany) Jasmin Wöhr	7–6^{(4)}, 7–5
Runner-up	7.	7 April 2007	Dinan, France	Clay (i)	(France) Aurélie Védy	(Germany) Angelique Kerber (Austria) Yvonne Meusburger	4–6, 7–6^{(6)}, 2–6
Runner-up	8.	11 May 2008	Zagreb, Croatia	Clay	(Croatia) Jelena Kostanić Tošić	(Hungary) Melinda Czink (United States) Sunitha Rao	4–6, 2–6
Winner	9.	20 July 2008	Contrexéville, France	Clay	(France) Aurélie Védy	(Argentina) Erica Krauth (Sweden) Hanna Nooni	6–4, 6–4
Runner-up	10.	27 July 2008	Pétange, Luxembourg	Clay	(Turkey) İpek Şenoğlu	(Italy) Corinna Dentoni (Russia) Anastasia Pivovarova	4–6, 1–6
Winner	11.	23 March 2009	Jersey, United Kingdom	Carpet (i)	(Italy) Maria Elena Camerin	(France) Youlia Fedossova (France) Violette Huck	6–4, 6–2
Winner	12.	19 October 2009	Saint-Raphaël, France	Hard (i)	(France) Claire Feuerstein	(Georgia (country)) Margalita Chakhnashvili (Spain) Sílvia Soler Espinosa	7–6^{(4)}, 7–5
Winner	13.	10 May 2010	Saint-Gaudens, France	Clay	(France) Claire Feuerstein	(Ukraine) Olga Savchuk (Belarus) Anastasiya Yakimova	6–2, 6–4
Winner	14.	7 June 2010	Zlín, Czech Republic	Clay	(Czech Republic) Eva Birnerová	(Czech Republic) Tereza Hladíková (Slovakia) Michaela Pochabová	7–5, 4–6, 6–4
Winner	15.	25 September 2010	Saguenay Challenger, Canada	Hard (i)	(Argentina) Jorgelina Cravero	(Canada) Heidi El Tabakh (Canada) Rebecca Marino	6–3, 6–4
Winner	16.	12 April 2011	Osprey, United States	Clay	(United States) Alexa Glatch	(Argentina) María Irigoyen (Japan) Erika Sema	4–6, 7–5, [10–7]
Winner	17.	4 July 2011	Bella Cup Toruń, Poland	Clay	(Germany) Tatjana Maria	(Romania) Edina Gallovits-Hall (Slovenia) Andreja Klepač	6–2, 7–5
Winner	18.	6 November 2011	Open Nantes, France	Hard (i)	(France) Kristina Mladenovic	(France) Julie Coin (Czech Republic) Eva Hrdinová	6–0, 6–4
Runner-up	19.	12 February 2012	Midland Classic, United States	Hard (i)	(Serbia) Vesna Dolonc	(Czech Republic) Andrea Hlaváčková (Czech Republic) Lucie Hradecká	6–7^{(4)}, 2–6
Runner-up	20.	28 October 2012	ITF Poitiers, France	Hard (i)	(Germany) Tatjana Maria	(Colombia) Catalina Castaño (Bosnia and Herzegovina) Mervana Jugić-Salkić	4–6, 7–5, [4–10]
Runner-up	21.	31 March 2013	ITF Croissy-Beaubourg, France	Hard (i)	(Czech Republic) Eva Hrdinová	(Germany) Anna-Lena Friedsam (Belgium) Alison Van Uytvanck	3–6, 4–6
Winner	22.	15 June 2013	Nottingham Challenge, UK	Grass	(France) Julie Coin	(Israel) Julia Glushko (Japan) Erika Sema	6–2, 6–4
Runner-up	23.	31 March 2013	Open Nantes, France	Hard (i)	(Czech Republic) Eva Hrdinová	(Czech Republic) Lucie Hradecká (Netherlands) Michaëlla Krajicek	3–6, 2–6
Winner	24.	19 October 2014	Open de Touraine, France	Hard (i)	(France) Amandine Hesse	(Italy) Alberta Brianti (Italy) Maria Elena Camerin	def.
Runner-up	25.	2 November 2014	Open Nantes, France	Hard (i)	(France) Amandine Hesse	(Ukraine) Lyudmyla Kichenok (Ukraine) Nadiia Kichenok	2–6, 3–6
Runner-up	26.	22 February 2015	ITF Kreuzlingen, Switzerland	Carpet (i)	(France) Irina Ramialison	(Ukraine) Lyudmyla Kichenok (Ukraine) Nadiia Kichenok	3–6, 3–6
Runner-up	27.	28 February 2015	Neva Cup, Russia	Hard (i)	(Croatia) Ana Vrljić	(Switzerland) Viktorija Golubic (Belarus) Aliaksandra Sasnovich	4–6, 5–7
Winner	28.	6 April 2015	GB Pro-Series Barnstaple, UK	Hard (i)	(Croatia) Ana Vrljić	(United Kingdom) Naomi Broady (Russia) Ekaterina Bychkova	6–2, 5–7, [10–7]
Runner-up	29.	10 May 2015	Nana Trophy, Tunisia	Clay	(France) Julie Coin	(Argentina) María Irigoyen (Poland) Paula Kania	1–6, 3–6
Winner	30.	11 October 2015	ITF Kirkland, United States	Hard	(Luxembourg) Mandy Minella	(Netherlands) Lesley Kerkhove (Netherlands) Arantxa Rus	6–4, 4–6, [10–4]
Runner-up	31.	1 November 2015	ITF Poitiers, France	Hard (i)	(France) Amandine Hesse	(Romania) Andreea Mitu (Romania) Monica Niculescu	7–6^{(5)}, 6–7^{(2)}, [8–10]

== Grand Slam performance timelines ==
Key
W	F	SF	QF	#R	RR	Q#	DNQ	A	NH

(W) winner; (F) finalist; (SF) semifinalist; (QF) quarterfinalist; (#R) rounds 4, 3, 2, 1; (RR) round-robin stage; (Q#) qualification round; (DNQ) did not qualify; (A) absent; (NH) not held; (SR) strike rate (events won / competed); (W–L) win–loss record.

=== Singles ===
Tournament	1999	2000	2001	2002	2003	2004	2005	2006	2007	2008	2009	2010	2011	2012	2013	W–L
Australian Open	A	LQ	LQ	LQ	2R	1R	1R	1R	1R	LQ	LQ	LQ	LQ	2R	2R	3–7
French Open	1R	2R	1R	1R	2R	2R	1R	1R	1R	1R	1R	1R	1R	2R	1R	4–15
Wimbledon	A	LQ	1R	1R	1R	2R	2R	1R	LQ	1R	1R	A	1R	2R	LQ	3–10
US Open	LQ	A	LQ	3R	1R	2R	1R	1R	LQ	LQ	LQ	LQ	1R	1R	LQ	3–7

=== Doubles ===
Tournament	1999	2000	2001	2002	2003	2004	2005	2006	2007	2008	2009	2010	2011	2012	2013	2014	W–L
Australian Open	A	A	A	A	A	1R	A	3R	1R	2R	A	A	A	2R	1R	A	4–6
French Open	1R	2R	1R	2R	1R	1R	1R	1R	2R	1R	1R	1R	1R	2R	1R	1R	4–16
Wimbledon	A	A	A	A	A	A	A	1R	2R	1R	A	A	A	2R	2R	A	3–5
US Open	A	A	A	A	A	A	1R	A	QF	1R	A	A	A	1R	A	A	3–4
