= Romy Farah =

Colombian tennis player

- Full name: Romy Farah Maksoud
- Country (sports): Colombia
- Born: 5 January 1985 (age 40); Beirut, Lebanon
- Height: 5 ft 6 in (168 cm)
- Plays: Right-handed
- College: University of Miami
- Prize money: $10,898

Singles
- Highest ranking: No. 493 (8 July 2002)

Doubles
- Highest ranking: No. 451 (27 October 2003)
- Fed Cup: 2–7

Romy Farah Maksoud (born 5 January 1985) is a Colombian former professional tennis player.

== Biography ==
Born to Lebanese parents in Beirut, Farah moved to Colombia at the age of two, via Canada. She grew up in the city of Cali. Her father Patrick coached tennis and comes from a generation of tennis players, while her mother Eva was a volleyball player who captained Lebanon's national team. She is the elder sister of tennis player Robert Farah.

Farah, a right-handed player, competed briefly on the professional tour while a junior, twice featuring in the singles main draw of the Copa Colsanitas WTA Tour tournament, in 2002 and 2003. She appeared in a total of eight Fed Cup ties for Colombia, which included a World Group fixture in 2003 against France. Retiring in 2004, Farah went on to play college tennis in the United States, for Clemson University and the University of Miami.

== ITF finals ==
=== Singles (0–1) ===
Outcome	No.	Date	Tournament	Surface	Opponent	Score
Runner-up	1.	17 June 2002	Montemor-o-Novo, Portugal	Hard	(United States) Amber Liu	2–6, 2–6

=== Doubles (0–4) ===
Outcome	No.	Date	Tournament	Surface	Partner	Opponents	Score
Runner-up	1.	25 November 2001	Cali, Colombia	Clay	(Ecuador) Mariana Correa	(Brazil) Livia Azzi (Brazil) Maria Fernanda Alves	5–7, 1–6
Runner-up	2.	25 May 2003	Almería, Spain	Hard	(Spain) Astrid Waernes	(Portugal) Neuza Silva (Turkey) İpek Şenoğlu	5–7, 7–5, 3–6
Runner-up	3.	5 October 2003	Carcavelos 1, Portugal	Clay	(Hungary) Ágnes Szávay	(Czech Republic) Iveta Gerlová (Slovakia) Katarína Kachlíková	4–6, 6–7^{(6–8)}
Runner-up	4.	18 October 2003	Carcavelos 2, Portugal	Clay	(Portugal) Neuza Silva	(Spain) Rosa María Andrés Rodríguez (France) Céline Beigbeder	2–6, 0–1 ret.

== See also ==
- List of Colombia Fed Cup team representatives
