= 2002 Copa Colsanitas =

- Date: 19–25 February
- Edition: 5th
- Category: Tier III
- Draw: 30S / 16D
- Prize money: $170,000
- Surface: Clay / outdoor
- Location: Bogotá, Colombia

Champions

Singles
- (Colombia) Fabiola Zuluaga

Doubles
- (Spain) Virginia Ruano Pascual (Argentina) Paola Suárez
- Copa Colsanitas

The 2002 Copa Colsanitas was a women's tennis tournament played on outdoor clay courts at the Club Campestre El Rancho in Bogotá, Colombia that was part of Tier III of the 2002 WTA Tour. It was the fifth edition of the Copa Colsanitas and ran from 19 through 25 February 2002. Unseeded wild-card Fabiola Zuluaga won the singles title and the $27,000 first prize.

== Finals ==
=== Singles ===
(Colombia) Fabiola Zuluaga defeated (Slovenia) Katarina Srebotnik 6–1, 6–4

- It was Zuluaga's 1st singles title of the year and the 4th of her career.

=== Doubles ===
(Spain) Virginia Ruano Pascual / (Argentina) Paola Suárez defeated (Slovenia) Tina Križan / (Slovenia) Katarina Srebotnik 6–2, 6–1
