= Rita Kuti-Kis =

Hungarian tennis player

Rita Kuti Kis
- Country (sports): Hungary
- Residence: Balatonlelle, Hungary
- Born: 13 February 1978 (age 47); Lengyeltóti, Hungary
- Height: 1.76 m (5 ft 9 in)
- Turned pro: 1991
- Retired: 2006
- Plays: Left (two-handed backhand)
- Prize money: $472,961

Singles
- Career record: 277–228
- Career titles: 1 WTA, 4 ITF
- Highest ranking: No. 47 (12 June 2000)

Grand Slam singles results
- Australian Open: 2R (2000, 2001)
- French Open: 3R (2000)
- Wimbledon: 1R (1999, 2000, 2001)
- US Open: 1R (1999, 2000, 2001)

Doubles
- Career record: 55–44
- Career titles: 7 ITF
- Highest ranking: No. 113 (14 February 2000)

Grand Slam doubles results
- French Open: 1R (1999)

Team competitions
- Fed Cup: 12–9

Rita Kuti Kis (born 13 February 1978) is a former professional tennis player from Hungary.

In 1992, she was beaten by future international No. 1, Martina Hingis, in the Petits As competition, a juniors tournament at Tarbes, France which has been renowned for the discovery of young tennis talent. Kuti Kis's most successful year was 2000, when she scored her one and only WTA Tour singles title in São Paulo. In the same year, she reached the third round of the French Open (losing to Monica Seles) and defeated then up-coming Jelena Dokić in the first round of the Australian Open.

Kuti Kis retired from professional tennis in 2006.

== WTA career finals ==
Legend
Tier I
Tier II
Tier III
Tier IV & V

=== Singles: 4 (1 title, 3 runner-ups) ===
Result	W/L	Date	Tournament	Surface	Opponent	Score
Loss	0–1	Apr 1999	Estoril, Portugal	Clay	(Slovenia) Katarina Srebotnik	3–6, 1–6
Win	1–1	Feb 2000	São Paulo, Brazil	Clay	(Argentina) Paola Suárez	4–6, 6–4, 7–5
Loss	1–2	May 2000	Strasbourg, France	Clay	(Croatia) Silvija Talaja	5–7, 6–4, 3–6
Loss	1–3	Feb 2001	Bogotá, Colombia	Clay	(Argentina) Paola Suárez	2–6, 4–6

=== Doubles: 2 (2 runner-ups) ===
Result	W/L	Date	Tournament	Surface	Partner	Opponents	Score
Loss	0–1	Apr 1999	Estoril, Portugal	Clay	(Hungary) Anna Földényi	(Spain) Alicia Ortuño (Spain) Cristina Torrens Valero	6–7^{(4–7)}, 6–3, 3–6
Loss	0–2	Feb 2000	Bogotá, Colombia	Clay	(Hungary) Petra Mandula	(Argentina) Laura Montalvo (Argentina) Paola Suárez	4–6, 2–6

== ITF Circuit finals ==
$50,000 tournaments
$25,000 tournaments
$10,000 tournaments

=== Singles: 10 (4–6) ===
Result	No.	Date	Tournament	Surface	Opponent	Score
Win	1.	28 September 1992	ITF Athens, Greece	Clay	(Germany) Claudia Timm	6–3, 6–3
Win	2.	13 June 1993	ITF Murska, Slovenia	Clay	(Serbia and Montenegro) Tatjana Ječmenica	6–2, 6–3
Loss	1.	12 April 1998	ITF Athens, Greece	Clay	(Israel) Anna Smashnova	6–1, 2–6, 2–6
Loss	2.	17 May 1998	ITF Nitra, Slovakia	Clay	(Slovakia) Ľudmila Cervanová	7–5, 4–6, 6–7^{(3)}
Loss	3.	26 July 1998	ITF Valladolid, Spain	Hard	(Romania) Raluca Sandu	3–6, 3–6
Win	3.	6 September 1998	ITF Spoleto, Italy	Clay	(Slovakia) Ľudmila Cervanová	6–1, 6–2
Loss	4.	19 September 1998	ITF Bordeaux, France	Clay	(Spain) María Sánchez Lorenzo	1–6, 4–6
Win	4.	28 September 1998	ITF Thessaloniki, Greece	Clay	(Czech Republic) Denisa Chládková	1–6, 6–1, 6–1
Loss	5.	10 October 2004	Open Nantes Atlantique, France	Hard (i)	(Belgium) Leslie Butkiewicz	2–6, 1–6
Loss	6.	30 October 2005	ITF Sant Cugat, Spain	Clay	(Spain) Lourdes Domínguez Lino	6–4, 0–6, 2–6

=== Doubles: 10 (7–3) ===
Result	No.	Date	Tournament	Surface	Partner	Opponents	Score
Loss	1.	13 December 1993	ITF Přerov, Czech Republic	Hard (i)	(Hungary) Petra Mandula	(Czech Republic) Ivana Jankovská (Czech Republic) Eva Melicharová	6–3, 5–7, 1–6
Win	1.	7 June 1998	ITF Budapest, Hungary	Clay	(Hungary) Anna Földényi	(Hungary) Petra Gáspár (Hungary) Petra Mandula	6–0, 6–4
Win	2.	21 June 1998	ITF Sopot, Poland	Clay	(Hungary) Anna Földényi	(Germany) Marketa Kochta (Germany) Syna Schmidle	6–1, 7–6^{(4)}
Win	3.	18 September 1998	ITF Bordeaux, France	Clay	(Hungary) Anna Földényi	(Netherlands) Amanda Hopmans (Germany) Sandra Klösel	6–2, 6–3
Win	4.	20 March 1999	ITF Reims, France	Clay (i)	(Slovakia) Janette Husárová	(Spain) Gisela Riera (Italy) Antonella Serra Zanetti	6–2, 6–3
Win	5.	27 March 1999	ITF Dinan, France	Clay (i)	(Slovakia) Janette Husárová	(Spain) Mariam Ramón Climent (Spain) Rosa María Andrés Rodríguez	6–4, 6–2
Loss	2.	24 July 2004	ITF Les Contamines, France	Hard	(Australia) Evie Dominikovic	(Czech Republic) Gabriela Chmelinová (France) Caroline Dhenin	4–6, 3–6
Loss	3.	9 October 2004	Open Nantes Atlantique, France	Hard (i)	(Hungary) Gréta Arn	(France) Iryna Brémond (Belarus) Tatsiana Uvarova	4–6, 6–4, 6–7^{(5)}
Win	6.	9 April 2005	ITF Coatzacoalcos, Mexico	Hard	(Ukraine) Mariya Koryttseva	(France) Kildine Chevalier (Argentina) Jorgelina Cravero	6–2, 6–3
Win	7.	10 September 2005	ITF Mestre, Italy	Clay	(Hungary) Kira Nagy	(Italy) Elisa Balsamo (Italy) Emily Stellato	7–5, 6–4

== Best Grand Slam results details ==
=== Singles ===
	Australian Open	
2000 Australian Open
Round	Opponent	Score
1R	(Australia) Jelena Dokic	6–1, 2–6, 6–3
2R	(Czech Republic) Květa Hrdličková	6–7^{(2–7)}, 7–6^{(7–5)}, 3–6
2001 Australian Open
Round	Opponent	Score
1R	(Italy) Francesca Schiavone	7–6^{(10–8)}, 1–6, 6–4
2R	(Russia) Anna Kournikova (8)	3–6, 4–6

	French Open	
2000 French Open
Round	Opponent	Score
1R	(United States) Jennifer Hopkins (Q)	6–2, 7–6^{(8–6)}
2R	(Hungary) Annamária Földényi (Q)	6–2, 7–5
3R	(United States) Monica Seles (3)	1–6, 2–6

	Wimbledon Championships	
1999 Wimbledon
Round	Opponent	Score
1R	(Spain) Conchita Martínez	2–6, 1–6
2000 Wimbledon
Round	Opponent	Score
1R	(United States) Alexandra Stevenson	5–7, 6–7^{(3–7)}
2001 Wimbledon
Round	Opponent	Score
1R	(United States) Serena Williams (5)	1–6, 0–6

	US Open	
1999 US Open
Round	Opponent	Score
1R	(Romania) Ruxandra Dragomir	1–6, 7–5, 4–6
2000 US Open
Round	Opponent	Score
1R	(United States) Marissa Irvin	4–6, 7–6^{(13–11)}, 5–7
2001 US Open
Round	Opponent	Score
1R	(Spain) Gala León García	4–6, 7–5, 1–6

=== Head-to-head record ===
- Serena Williams 0-1
- Arantxa Sánchez Vicario 0-1
- Anna Kournikova 0-1
- Nadia Petrova 0-1
- Jelena Dokic 1-1
- Jelena Janković 0-1
