= Patricia Wartusch =

Austrian tennis player

- Country (sports): Austria
- Residence: Vienna, Austria
- Born: 5 August 1978 (age 47) Innsbruck, Austria
- Height: 1.75 m (5 ft 9 in)
- Turned pro: September 1997
- Retired: 2005
- Plays: Right (two-handed backhand)
- Prize money: US$ 657,243

Singles
- Career record: 236–214
- Career titles: 2
- Highest ranking: No. 65 (24 April 2000)

Grand Slam singles results
- Australian Open: 2R (2001)
- French Open: 1R (2000, 2003)
- Wimbledon: 3R (2000)
- US Open: 1R (2000, 2002)

Doubles
- Career record: 176–128
- Career titles: 6
- Highest ranking: No. 22 (12 May 2003)

Grand Slam doubles results
- Australian Open: 3R (2001, 2004)
- French Open: QF (2002)
- Wimbledon: QF (2003)
- US Open: 3R (2003)

Patricia Wartusch (born 5 August 1978) is a former professional tennis player from Austria.

She reached her career-high singles ranking of world No. 65 in 2000. She won in her career two singles and six doubles titles on the WTA Tour. She won the Austrian Championships three consecutive times as a junior (992-1994).

== WTA Tour finals ==
=== Singles: 3 (2 titles, 1 runner-up) ===
Legend
Grand Slam tournaments
Premier M & Premier 5
Premier
International (2–1)

Result	No.	Date	Tournament	Surface	Opponent	Score
Loss	1.	Oct 1999	Brasil Open, São Paulo	Clay	(Colombia) Fabiola Zuluaga	5–7, 6–4, 5–7
Win	1.	Feb 2000	Copa Colsanitas, Bogotá	Clay	(Italy) Tathiana Garbin	4–6, 6–1, 6–4
Win	2.	Jul 2002	Casablanca Grand Prix, Morocco	Clay	(Czech Republic) Klára Zakopalová	5–7, 6–3, 6–3

=== Doubles: 12 (6 titles, 6 runner-ups) ===
Result	No.	Date	Tournament	Surface	Partner	Opponents	Score
Win	1.	Jun 1999	Tashkent Open, Uzbekistan	Clay	(Russia) Evgenia Kulikovskaya	(Spain) Eva Bes (Spain) Gisela Riera	7–6^{(3)}, 6–0
Loss	1.	Nov 1999	Pattaya Open, Thailand	Hard	(Russia) Evgenia Kulikovskaya	(France) Émilie Loit (Sweden) Åsa Carlsson	1–6, 4–6
Loss	2.	Jan 2000	Auckland Open, New Zealand	Hard	(Austria) Barbara Schwartz	(Zimbabwe) Cara Black (France) Alexandra Fusai	6–3, 3–6, 4–6
Loss	3.	Oct 2000	Bratislava Open, Slovakia	Hard (i)	(Hungary) Petra Mandula	(Slovakia) Karina Habšudová (Slovakia) Daniela Hantuchová	w/o
Win	2.	Jun 2001	Tashkent Open, Uzbekistan	Hard	(Hungary) Petra Mandula	(Ukraine) Tatiana Perebiynis (Belarus) Tatiana Poutchek	6–1, 6–4
Win	3.	Jun 2002	Austrian Open, Vienna	Clay	(Hungary) Petra Mandula	(Austria) Barbara Schwartz (Germany) Jasmin Wöhr	6–2, 6–4
Win	4.	Jul 2002	Casablanca Grand Prix, Morocco	Clay	(Hungary) Petra Mandula	(Argentina) Gisela Dulko (Spain) Conchita Martínez Granados	6–2, 6–1
Loss	4.	Sep 2002	Tokyo Cup, Japan	Hard	(Hungary) Petra Mandula	(Russia) Svetlana Kuznetsova (Spain) Arantxa Sánchez Vicario	2–6, 4–6
Loss	5.	Jan 2003	Hobart International, Australia	Hard	(Austria) Barbara Schett	(Zimbabwe) Cara Black (Russia) Elena Likhovtseva	5–7, 6–7^{(1)}
Loss	6.	Mar 2003	Abierto Acapulco, Mexico	Clay	(Hungary) Petra Mandula	(France) Émilie Loit (Sweden) Åsa Svensson	3–6, 1–6
Win	5.	Apr 2003	Estoril Open, Portugal	Clay	(Hungary) Petra Mandula	(Estonia) Maret Ani (Switzerland) Emmanuelle Gagliardi	6–7^{(3)}, 7–6^{(3)}, 6–2
Win	6.	May 2003	Bol Ladies Open, Croatia	Clay	(Hungary) Petra Mandula	(Switzerland) Emmanuelle Gagliardi (Switzerland) Patty Schnyder	6–3, 6–2

== ITF Circuit finals ==
$75,000 tournaments
$50,000 tournaments
$25,000 tournaments
$10,000 tournaments

=== Singles: 13 (5–8) ===
Result	No.	Date	Tournament	Surface	Opponent	Score
Loss	1.	22 May 1995	ITF Salzburg, Austria	Clay	(United States) Corina Morariu	2–6, 2–6
Loss	2.	27 November 1995	Salzburg, Austria	Carpet (i)	(Germany) Heike Thoms	5–7, 6–7^{(1)}
Win	1.	12 May 1996	Amazonas, Brazil	Hard	(United States) Kristine Kurth	6–3, 7–6^{(10)}
Win	2.	16 June 1996	Tashkent, Uzbekistan	Clay	(Germany) Katrin Kilsch	6–1, 6–4
Loss	3.	27 July 1997	Dublin, Ireland	Carpet	(South Africa) Surina De Beer	4–6, 6–3, 6–7^{(2)}
Win	3.	1 June 1998	Tashkent, Uzbekistan	Hard	(Israel) Tzipora Obziler	6–3, 6–2
Loss	4.	15 November 1998	Ramat Hasharon, Israel	Hard	(Belgium) Justine Henin	2–6, 4–6
Loss	5.	16 May 1999	Edinburgh, United Kingdom	Clay	(Spain) Ángeles Montolio	3–6, 4–6
Loss	6.	21 June 1999	Stuttgart-Vaihingen, Germany	Clay	(China) Li Fang	4–6, 6–7^{(4)}
Loss	7.	19 July 1999	Ettenheim, Germany	Clay	(Slovakia) Martina Suchá	2–6, 6–3, 3–6
Win	4.	26 July 1999	Bytom, Poland	Clay	(Spain) Eva Bes	6–2, 6–4
Win	5.	23 September 2001	Tbilisi, Georgia	Clay	(Russia) Maria Kondratieva	6–0, 4–6, 6–2
Loss	8.	21 September 2003	Sofia, Bulgaria	Clay	(France) Séverine Beltrame	3–6, 4–6

=== Doubles: 14 (8–6) ===
Result	No.	Date	Tournament	Surface	Partner	Opponents	Score
Win	1.	20 November 1995	ITF Le Havre, France	Clay (i)	(Czech Republic) Markéta Štusková	(Serbia and Montenegro) Dragana Zarić (North Macedonia) Marina Lazarovska	6–4, 7–5
Win	2.	16 February 1997	ITF Rogaska Slatina, Slovenia	Carpet (i)	(Austria) Barbara Schwartz	(Israel) Hila Rosen (Serbia and Montenegro) Dragana Zarić	6–1, 6–4
Win	3.	19 May 1997	ITF Brixen, Austria	Clay	(Germany) Caroline Schneider	(Argentina) Luciana Masante (Switzerland) Miroslava Vavrinec	6–3, 6–0
Win	4.	26 May 1997	ITF Salzburg, Austria	Clay (i)	(Germany) Caroline Schneider	(Italy) Laura Dell'Angelo (Italy) Tathiana Garbin	1–6, 6–3, 6–3
Win	5.	19 October 1997	ITF Flensburg, Germany	Carpet (i)	(Germany) Jasmin Wöhr	(Hungary) Virág Csurgó (Germany) Kirstin Freye	6–3, 3–6, 6–3
Loss	1.	15 February 1999	ITF Redbridge, United Kingdom	Hard (i)	(Czech Republic) Lenka Němečková	(Hungary) Nóra Köves (Serbia and Montenegro) Dragana Zarić	1–6, 4–6
Win	6.	21 June 1999	ITF Stuttgart-Vaihingen, Germany	Clay	(Germany) Jasmin Wöhr	(Czech Republic) Radka Pelikánová (Czech Republic) Ludmila Richterová	6–1, 7–6^{(6)}
Win	2.	25 July 1999	ITF Ettenheim, Germany	Clay	(Germany) Jasmin Wöhr	(Spain) Eva Bes (Spain) Lourdes Domínguez Lino	5–7, 4–6
Loss	3.	22 August 1999	Bronx Open, United States	Hard	(Netherlands) Seda Noorlander	(South Africa) Surina De Beer (Japan) Nana Smith	6–3, 0–6, 3–6
Loss	4.	15 October 2000	Internationaux de Poitiers, France	Hard (i)	(Hungary) Petra Mandula	(Netherlands) Yvette Basting (Hungary) Katalin Marosi	6–7^{(4)}, 1–6
Win	7.	11 August 2001	ITF Rimini, Italy	Clay	(Hungary) Petra Mandula	(Czech Republic) Milena Nekvapilová (Czech Republic) Hana Šromová	6–2, 6–1
Win	8.	17 September 2001	ITF Tbilisi, Georgia	Clay	(Australia) Anastasia Rodionova	(Argentina) Erica Krauth (Argentina) Vanesa Krauth	6–2, 6–1
Loss	5.	3 February 2002	ITF Ortisei, Italy	Carpet	(Germany) Angelika Bachmann	(Ukraine) Yuliya Beygelzimer (Australia) Anastasia Rodionova	4–6, 2–6
Loss	6.	26 April 2004	ITF Taranto, Italy	Clay	(Austria) Stefanie Haidner	(Austria) Daniela Klemenschits (Austria) Sandra Klemenschits	2–6, 1–6

=== Head-to-head records ===
- Elena Dementieva: 0–1
- Kim Clijsters: 0–1
- Svetlana Kuznetsova: 1–0
- Arantxa Sánchez Vicario: 0–1
- Serena Williams: 0–1
- Anna Kournikova: 0–1
- Justine Henin: 0–4
- Silvia Farina Elia: 1–0
- Iva Majoli: 0–1
