= Petra Mandula =

Hungarian tennis player

- Country (sports): Hungary
- Residence: Budapest
- Born: 17 January 1978 (age 48) Budapest
- Height: 1.78 m (5 ft 10 in)
- Turned pro: 1993
- Retired: 2005
- Plays: Right-handed (two-handed backhand)
- Prize money: $991,024

Singles
- Career record: 284–189
- Career titles: 7 ITF
- Highest ranking: No. 30 (17 May 2004)

Grand Slam singles results
- Australian Open: 3R (2004)
- French Open: QF (2001)
- Wimbledon: 2R (2001, 2003)
- US Open: 2R (2002, 2003)

Other tournaments
- Olympic Games: 1R (2000, 2004)

Doubles
- Career record: 173–104
- Career titles: 7 WTA, 8 ITF
- Highest ranking: No. 13 (5 May 2003)

Grand Slam doubles results
- Australian Open: SF (2003)
- French Open: QF (2002)
- Wimbledon: QF (2003)
- US Open: 3R (2003)

Other doubles tournaments
- Olympic Games: QF (2000)

Petra Mandula (Hungarian pronunciation: [ˈpɛtrɒ ˈmɒndulɒ]; born 17 January 1978) is a Hungarian former professional tennis player, who represented her native country at the 2000 Summer Olympics in Sydney; in singles, she was eliminated in the first round by fourth seed Conchita Martínez of Spain, in doubles, she reached the quarterfinals, partnering Katalin Marosi. Four years later, when Athens hosted the Games, she once again was defeated in the first round, this time by Patty Schnyder of Switzerland.

She reached the quarterfinals at the 2001 French Open as a qualifier, winning seven straight matches and losing to eventual runner-up, Kim Clijsters. Two years later, at the 2003 French Open, she almost repeated the feat, losing in the fourth round 5–7 in the third set to Chanda Rubin. Also in 2003, Mandula reached the semifinals of the Australian Open with Emmanuelle Gagliardi, losing to Virginia Ruano Pascual and Paola Suárez.

== WTA career finals ==
=== Doubles: 11 (7 titles, 4 runner-ups) ===
Legend
Tier I	0
Tier II	0
Tier III	3
Tier IV & V	4

Finals by surface
Hard	1–2
Clay	6–2
Grass	0–0
Carpet	0–0

Result	No.	Date	Tournament	Surface	Partner	Opponents	Score
Loss	1.	Feb 2000	Copa Colsanitas, Bogotá	Clay	(Hungary) Rita Kuti-Kis	(Argentina) Laura Montalvo (Argentina) Paola Suárez	4–6, 2–6
Loss	2.	Oct 2000	Bratislava Open, Slovakia	Hard (i)	(Austria) Patricia Wartusch	(Slovakia) Karina Habšudová (Slovakia) Daniela Hantuchová	w/o
Win	1.	Jun 2001	Tashkent Open, Uzbekistan	Hard	(Austria) Patricia Wartusch	(Ukraine) Tatiana Perebiynis (Belarus) Tatiana Poutchek	6–1, 6–4
Win	2.	Jun 2002	Austrian Open, Vienna	Clay	(Austria) Patricia Wartusch	(Austria) Barbara Schwartz (Germany) Jasmin Wöhr	6–2, 6–4
Win	3.	Jul 2002	Casablanca Grand Prix, Morocco	Clay	(Austria) Patricia Wartusch	(Argentina) Gisela Dulko (Spain) Conchita Martínez Granados	6–2, 6–1
Loss	3.	Sep 2002	Toyota Princess Cup, Tokyo	Hard	(Austria) Patricia Wartusch	(Russia) Svetlana Kuznetsova (Spain) Arantxa Sánchez Vicario	2–6, 4–6
Loss	4.	Mar 2003	Abierto Mexicano, Acapulco	Clay	(Austria) Patricia Wartusch	(France) Émilie Loit (Sweden) Åsa Svensson	3–6, 1–6
Win	4.	Apr 2003	Portugal Open, Estoril	Clay	(Austria) Patricia Wartusch	(Estonia) Maret Ani (Switzerland) Emmanuelle Gagliardi	6–7^{(3–7)}, 7–6^{(7–3)}, 6–2
Win	5.	Apr 2003	Budapest Grand Prix, Hungary	Clay	(Ukraine) Elena Tatarkova	(Spain) Conchita Martínez Granados (Ukraine) Tatiana Perebiynis	6–3, 6–1
Win	6.	May 2003	Bol Open, Croatia	Clay	(Austria) Patricia Wartusch	(Switzerland) Emmanuelle Gagliardi (Switzerland) Patty Schnyder	6–3, 6–2
Win	7.	May 2004	Budapest Grand Prix, Hungary	Clay	(Austria) Barbara Schett	(Hungary) Virág Németh (Hungary) Ágnes Szávay	6–3, 6–2

== ITF finals ==
=== Singles: 13 (7–6) ===
$100,000 tournaments
$75,000 tournaments
$50,000 tournaments
$25,000 tournaments
$10,000 tournaments

Result	No.	Date	Tournament	Surface	Opponent	Score
Loss	1.	13 September 1993	ITF Zadar, Croatia	Clay	(Hungary) Andrea Noszály	3–6, 3–6
Win	1.	7 February 1998	ITF Birkenhead, United Kingdom	Hard (i)	(Italy) Giulia Casoni	6–0, 2–6, 6–3
Win	2.	17 May 1998	ITF Novi Sad, Serbia	Clay	(Bulgaria) Antoaneta Pandjerova	0–6, 7–5, 6–1
Loss	2.	31 May 1998	ITF Salzburg, Austria	Clay	(Hungary) Anna Földényi	6–1, 2–6, 2–6
Win	3.	19 July 1998	ITF Darmstadt, Germany	Clay	(Bulgaria) Lubomira Bacheva	3–6, 6–4, 7–5
Loss	3.	26 July 1998	ITF Dublin, Ireland	Carpet	(United Kingdom) Lucie Ahl	6–7, 3–6
Win	4.	11 April 1999	ITF Makarska, Croatia	Clay	(Bulgaria) Desislava Topalova	7–5, 7–5
Loss	4.	6 June 1999	ITF Budapest, Hungary	Clay	(Slovakia) Janette Husárová	4–6, 2–6
Win	5.	11 July 1999	ITF Darmstadt, Germany	Clay	(Spain) Marta Marrero	1–6, 7–5, 6–1
Win	6.	1 August 1999	ITF Edinburgh, United Kingdom	Clay	(Israel) Tzipora Obziler	6–0, 4–6, 7–5
Loss	5.	16 April 2000	ITF Magli, Italy	Clay	(Bulgaria) Antoaneta Pandjerova	4–6, 6–2, 5–7
Loss	6.	12 August 2001	ITF Rimini, Italy	Clay	(Argentina) Gisela Dulko	6–1, 3–6, 1–6
Win	7.	14 October 2001	ITF Poitiers, France	Hard (i)	(France) Émilie Loit	7–5, 2–6, 6–1

=== Doubles: 12 (7–5) ===
Result	No.	Date	Tournament	Surface	Partner	Opponents	Score
Loss	1.	13 December 1993	ITF Přerov, Czech Republic	Hard (i)	(Hungary) Rita Kuti-Kis	(Czech Republic) Ivana Jankovská (Czech Republic) Eva Melicharová	6–3, 5–7, 1–6
Win	1.	31 October 1994	ITF Montevideo, Uruguay	Clay	(Hungary) Virág Csurgó	(South Africa) Nannie de Villiers (Brazil) Ana Paula Zannoni	6–4, 7–5
Win	2.	7 November 1994	ITF Buenos Aires, Argentina	Clay	(Hungary) Virág Csurgó	(South Africa) Nannie de Villiers (Argentina) Laura Montalvo	6–3, 6–3
Win	3.	14 November 1994	ITF La Plata, Argentina	Clay	(Hungary) Virág Csurgó	(Slovakia) Patrícia Marková (Japan) Yuka Tanaka	7–6^{(3)}, 7–5
Loss	2.	4 October 1997	ITF Otočec, Slovenia	Clay	(Hungary) Katalin Marosi	(Czech Republic) Lenka Cenková (Czech Republic) Kateřina Kroupová	5–7, 6–7^{(3)}
Loss	3.	1 June 1998	ITF Budapest, Hungary	Clay	(Hungary) Petra Gáspár	(Hungary) Anna Földényi (Hungary) Rita Kuti-Kis	0–6, 4–6
Loss	4.	10 April 1999	ITF Makarska, Croatia	Clay	(Germany) Gréta Arn	(Czech Republic) Gabriela Chmelinová (Czech Republic) Olga Vymetálková	6–0, 3–6, 6–7^{(3)}
Win	4.	10 July 1999	ITF Darmstadt, Germany	Clay	(Belarus) Tatiana Poutchek	(Czech Republic) Ludmila Richterová (Czech Republic) Monika Maštalířová	6–3, 6–1
Win	5.	31 July 1999	ITF Edinburgh, United Kingdom	Clay	(Romania) Magda Mihalache	(Australia) Trudi Musgrave (United Kingdom) Lorna Woodroffe	3–6, 6–4, 6–3
Win	6.	29 July 2000	ITF Liège, Belgium	Clay	(Hungary) Virág Csurgó	(Spain) Eva Bes (Spain) Gisela Riera	7–6^{(3)}, 6–1
Loss	5.	15 October 2000	ITF Poitiers, France	Hard (i)	(Austria) Patricia Wartusch	(Netherlands) Yvette Basting (Hungary) Katalin Marosi	6–7^{(4)}, 1–6
Win	7.	11 August 2001	ITF Rimini, Italy	Clay	(Austria) Patricia Wartusch	(Czech Republic) Milena Nekvapilová (Czech Republic) Hana Šromová	6–2, 6–1

== Best Grand Slam results details ==
=== Singles ===
	Australian Open			
2004 Australian Open
Round	Opponent	Rank	Score	PMR
1R	(Spain) Gala León García	No. 95	6–4, 4–6, 6–4	No. 39
2R	(Bulgaria) Magdalena Maleeva (24)	No. 29	6–7^{(6–8)}, 6–2, 6–3	No. 39
3R	(Hungary) Anikó Kapros	No. 80	6–3, 3–6, 10–12	No. 39

	French Open	
2001 French Open (qualifier)
Round	Opponent	Score
Q1	(United Kingdom) Lucie Ahl	6–0, 6–4
Q2	(United States) Samantha Reeves	6–2, 6–4
Q3	(Germany) Anca Barna (11)	6–2, 6–2
1R	(Japan) Ai Sugiyama	4–6, 6–4, 6–3
2R	(Paraguay) Rossana de los Ríos	7–5, 5–7, 7–5
3R	(Federal Republic of Yugoslavia) Jelena Dokic (15)	3–6, 6–4, 6–4
4R	(Italy) Rita Grande	6–2, 6–3
QF	(Belgium) Kim Clijsters (12)	1–6, 3–6

	Wimbledon Championships	
2001 Wimbledon
Round	Opponent	Score
1R	(Slovakia) Janette Husárová	0–6, 6–2, 11–9
2R	(France) Nathalie Tauziat (9)	0–6, 1–6
2003 Wimbledon
Round	Opponent	Score
1R	(Switzerland) Patty Schnyder (20)	7–6^{(7–2)}, 6–3
2R	(Uzbekistan) Iroda Tulyaganova	3–6, 4–6

	US Open	
2002 US Open
Round	Opponent	Score
1R	(Netherlands) Miriam Oremans	4–6, 6–4, 6–2
2R	(United States) Lindsay Davenport (4)	4–6, 2–6
2003 US Open
Round	Opponent	Score
1R	(Zimbabwe) Cara Black	7–5, 6–2
2R	(Russia) Svetlana Kuznetsova (27)	3–6, 3–6

=== Doubles ===
	Australian Open	
2003 Australian Open
with (Switzerland) Emmanuelle Gagliardi
Round	Opponents	Score
1R	(Spain) María José Martínez Sánchez / (Spain) Anabel Medina Garrigues	6–3, 6–2
2R	(Russia) Elena Dementieva / (Slovakia) Janette Husárová (3)	6–2, 3–6, 6–0
3R	(Hungary) Zsófia Gubacsi / (Spain) Conchita Martínez Granados	7–6^{(7–4)}, 6–2
QF	(Slovakia) Daniela Hantuchová / (United States) Meghann Shaughnessy (5)	6–4, 6–2
SF	(Spain) Virginia Ruano Pascual / (Argentina) Paola Suárez (2)	0–6, 2–6

	French Open	
2002 French Open
with (Austria) Patricia Wartusch
Round	Opponents	Score
1R	(Spain) Conchita Martínez / (Argentina) Patricia Tarabini (8)	6–1, 7–6^{(8–6)}
2R	(Russia) Galina Fokina / (Ukraine) Tatiana Perebiynis	4–6, 6–0, 6–4
3R	(Australia) Alicia Molik / (Spain) Magüi Serna	6–3, 2–6, 6–3
QF	(Japan) Rika Fujiwara / (Japan) Ai Sugiyama (15)	0–6, 6–2, 4–6

	Wimbledon Championships	
2003 Wimbledon (12th Seed)
with (Austria) Patricia Wartusch
Round	Opponents	Score
1R	(United States) Nicole Arendt / (Australia) Evie Dominikovic	2–6, 6–3, 6–3
2R	(Croatia) Iva Majoli / (Germany) Barbara Rittner	2–6, 6–1, 6–3
3R	(Zimbabwe) Cara Black / (Russia) Elena Likhovtseva (5)	3–6, 7–6^{(8–6)}, 6–2
QF	(Spain) Virginia Ruano Pascual / (Argentina) Paola Suárez (1)	2–6, 6–7^{(5–7)}

	US Open	
2003 US Open (9th Seed)
with (Austria) Patricia Wartusch
Round	Opponents	Score
1R	(United States) Christina Fusano / (United States) Raquel Kops-Jones (WC)	6–3, 5–7, 6–1
2R	(South Korea) Cho Yoon-jeong / (Australia) Samantha Stosur	6–4, 6–0
3R	(South Africa) Liezel Huber / (Bulgaria) Magdalena Maleeva	4–6, 1–6

== Record against top 10 players ==
Mandula's record against players who have been ranked in the top 10:

Player	Years	Record	Win%	Hard	Clay	Grass	Carpet	Last match
No. 1 ranked players								
(United States) Jennifer Capriati	2004	1–0	100%	–	1–0	–	–	Won (7–6^{(7–3)}, 3–6, 7–5) at 2004 Charleston
(Belgium) Kim Clijsters	2001–03	0–2	0%	0–1	0–1	–	–	Lost (0–6, 0–6) at 2003 Australian Open
(United States) Lindsay Davenport	2002	0–1	0%	0–1	–	–	–	Lost (4–6, 2–6) at 2002 US Open
(Federal Republic of Yugoslavia) Jelena Janković	2003	1–0	100%	1–0	–	–	–	Won (6–4, 6–2) at 2003 Indian Wells
(France) Amélie Mauresmo	2003	0–1	0%	0–1	–	–	–	Lost (2–6, 6–2, 6–7^{(5–7)}) at 2003 Dubai
(Spain) Arantxa Sánchez Vicario	2001–02	1–2	33%	0–1	1–1	–	–	Won (4–6, 6–3, 7–6^{(7–3)}) at 2002 Espoo
(Russia) Maria Sharapova	2004	0–1	0%	–	0–1	–	–	Lost (4–5 ret.) at 2004 Berlin
(United States) Venus Williams	2004	0–1	0%	0–1	–	–	–	Lost (3–6, 6–7^{(3–7)}) at 2004 US Open
Number 2 ranked players								
(Russia) Svetlana Kuznetsova	2003	0–1	0%	0–1	–	–	–	Lost (3–6, 3–6) at 2003 US Open
(Spain) Conchita Martínez	2000	0–1	0%	0–1	–	–	–	Lost (1–6, 0–6) at 2000 Summer Olympics
(Russia) Anastasia Myskina	2001–03	2–1	67%	0–1	1–1	–	–	Won (6–4, 3–0 ret.) at 2003 Sopot
Number 3 ranked players								
(Russia) Elena Dementieva	2003	0–1	0%	0–1	–	–	–	Lost (3–6, 6–7^{(1–7)}) at 2003 Shanghai
(Russia) Nadia Petrova	2002–04	0–2	0%	0–1	0–1	–	–	Lost (1–6, 4–6) at 2004 Amelia Island
(France) Nathalie Tauziat	2001	0–1	0%	–	–	0–1	–	Lost (0–6, 1–6) at 2001 Wimbledon
Number 4 ranked players								
(Federal Republic of Yugoslavia) / (Serbia and Montenegro) Jelena Dokic	2001–04	3–1	75%	1–1	2–0	–	–	Won (7–6^{(7–2)}, 3–6, 6–2) at 2004 Charleston
(Bulgaria) Magdalena Maleeva	2004	1–0	100%	1–0	–	–	–	Won (6–7^{(6–8)}, 6–2, 6–3) at 2004 Australian Open
(Italy) Francesca Schiavone	2001–02	1–2	33%	1–1	–	0–1	–	Lost (4–6, 3–6) at 2002 Wimbledon
Number 5 ranked players								
(Slovakia) Daniela Hantuchová	2001–03	0–2	0%	0–1	0–1	–	–	Lost (2–6, 3–6) at 2003 Indian Wells
Number 6 ranked players								
(Italy) Flavia Pennetta	2003–05	2–0	100%	1–0	1–0	–	–	Won (3–6, 6–1, 6–3) at 2005 Australian Open
(United States) Chanda Rubin	2003	0–1	0%	–	0–1	–	–	Lost (6–4, 2–6, 5–7) at 2003 French Open
Number 7 ranked players								
(Austria) Barbara Schett	2002–03	2–0	100%	1–0	1–0	–	–	Won (6–3, 6–3) at 2003 Linz
(Switzerland) Patty Schnyder	2003–04	1–1	50%	0–1	–	1–0	–	Lost (3–6, 4–6) at 2004 Summer Olympics
Number 8 ranked players								
(Russia) Anna Kournikova	2002	1–0	100%	–	1–0	–	–	Won (7–6^{(7–5)}, 6–2) at 2002 Strasbourg
(Australia) Alicia Molik	1999	0–1	0%	0–1	–	–	–	Lost (4–6, 6–4, 3–6) at 1999 Kuala Lumpur
(Japan) Ai Sugiyama	2001	1–0	100%	–	1–0	–	–	Won (4–6, 6–4, 6–3) at 2001 French Open
Number 9 ranked players								
(Argentina) Paola Suárez	2000	0–2	0%	–	0–2	–	–	Lost (6–6, ret.) at 2000 São Paulo
(France) Sandrine Testud	2000	0–1	0%	0–1	–	–	–	Lost (3–6, 6–4, 3–6) at 2000 Australian Open
Total	1999–2004	17–26	40%	6–16 (27%)	10–8 (56%)	1–2 (33%)	0–0 ( – )	

=== Top 10 wins ===
Mandula has a 3–9 W–L record against players who were, at the time the match was played, ranked in the top 10.

Season	2001	2002	2003	2004	2005	Total
Wins	0	0	2	1	0	3

#	Player	Rank	Event	Surface	Rd	Score	PMR
2003
1.	(Russia) Anastasia Myskina	No. 10	French Open, France	Clay	2R	6–3, 6–4	No. 75
2.	(Russia) Anastasia Myskina	No. 10	Idea Prokom Open, Poland	Clay	QF	6–4, 3–0 ret.	No. 52
2004
3.	(United States) Jennifer Capriati	No. 8	Family Circle Cup, United States	Clay	3R	7–6^{(7–3)}, 3–6, 7–5	No. 42
