= 2010 WTA Premier Mandatory and Premier 5 tournaments =

Women's professional tennis tour

2010 Premier Mandatory / Premier 5
Details
- Duration: February 15 – October 10
- Edition: 21st
- Tournaments: 9

Achievements (singles)
- Most titles: (Denmark) Caroline Wozniacki (3)
- Most finals: (Denmark) Caroline Wozniacki (4)

The WTA Premier Mandatory and Premier 5 tournaments, which are part of the WTA Premier tournaments, make up the elite tour for professional women's tennis organised by the WTA called the WTA Tour. There are four Premier Mandatory tournaments: Indian Wells, Miami, Madrid and Beijing and five Premier 5 tournaments: Dubai, Rome, Cincinnati, Canada and Tokyo.

== Tournaments ==
Tournament	Country	Location	Surface	Date	Prize money
Barclays Dubai Tennis Championships	United Arab Emirates	Dubai	Hard	Feb 15 – 21	$2,000,000
BNP Paribas Open	United States	Indian Wells	Hard	Mar 8 – 21	$4,500,000
Sony Ericsson Open	United States	Key Biscayne	Hard	May 22 – Apr 4	$4,500,000
Internazionali BNL d'Italia	Italy	Rome	Clay (red)	May 3 – 9	$2,000,000
Mutua Madrileña Madrid Open	Spain	Madrid	Clay (red)	May 10 – 16	$4,500,000
W&S Financial Group Women's Open	United States	Mason	Hard	Aug 9 – 15	$2,000,000
Rogers Cup	Canada	Montreal	Hard	Aug 16 – 22	$2,000,000
Toray Pan Pacific Open	Japan	Tokyo	Hard	Sep 27 – Oct 3	$2,000,000
China Open	China	Beijing	Hard	Oct 4 – 10	$4,500,000

== Results ==
* First-time champion

Tournament	Singles champions	Runners-up	Score	Doubles champions	Runners-up	Score
Dubai Singles – Doubles	(United States) Venus Williams	(Belarus) Victoria Azarenka	6–3, 7–5	(Spain) Nuria Llagostera Vives (Spain) María José Martínez Sánchez	(Czech Republic) Květa Peschke (Slovakia) Katarina Srebotnik	7–6^{(7–5)}, 6–4
Indian Wells Singles – Doubles	(Serbia) Jelena Janković	(Denmark) Caroline Wozniacki	6–2, 6–4	(Czech Republic) Květa Peschke (Slovakia) Katarina Srebotnik	(Russia) Nadia Petrova (Australia) Samantha Stosur	6–4, 2–6, [10–5]
Miami Singles – Doubles	(Belgium) Kim Clijsters	(United States) Venus Williams	6–2, 6–1	(Argentina) Gisela Dulko* (Italy) Flavia Pennetta*	(Russia) Nadia Petrova (Australia) Samantha Stosur	6–3, 4–6, [10–7]
Rome Singles – Doubles	(Spain) María José Martínez Sánchez*	(Serbia) Jelena Janković	7–6^{7–5}, 7–5	(Argentina) Gisela Dulko (2) (Italy) Flavia Pennetta (2)	(Spain) María José Martínez Sánchez (Spain) Nuria Llagostera Vives	6–4, 6–2
Madrid Singles – Doubles	(France) Aravane Rezaï*	(United States) Venus Williams	6–2, 7–5	(United States) Serena Williams (United States) Venus Williams	(Argentina) Gisela Dulko (Italy) Flavia Pennetta	6–2, 7–5
Cincinnati Singles – Doubles	(Belgium) Kim Clijsters (2)	(Russia) Maria Sharapova	2–6, 7–6^{(7–4)}, 6–2	(Belarus) Victoria Azarenka	(United States) Lisa Raymond (Australia) Rennae Stubbs	7–6^{(7–4)}, 7–6^{(10–8)}
Cincinnati Singles – Doubles	(Belgium) Kim Clijsters (2)	(Russia) Maria Sharapova	2–6, 7–6^{(7–4)}, 6–2	(Russia) Maria Kirilenko*	(United States) Lisa Raymond (Australia) Rennae Stubbs	7–6^{(7–4)}, 7–6^{(10–8)}
Montréal Singles – Doubles	(Denmark) Caroline Wozniacki*	(Russia) Vera Zvonareva	6–3, 6–2	(Argentina) Gisela Dulko (3) (Italy) Flavia Pennetta (3)	(Czech Republic) Květa Peschke (Slovenia) Katarina Srebotnik	7–5, 3–6, [12–10]
Tokyo Singles – Doubles	(Denmark) Caroline Wozniacki (2)	(Russia) Elena Dementieva	1–6, 6–2, 6–3	(Czech Republic) Iveta Benešová* (Czech Republic) Barbora Strýcová*	(Israel) Shahar Pe'er (China) Peng Shuai	6–4, 4–6, [10-8]
Beijing Singles – Doubles	(Denmark) Caroline Wozniacki (3)	(Russia) Vera Zvonareva	6–3, 3–6, 6–3	(Chinese Taipei) Chuang Chia-jung	(Argentina) Gisela Dulko (Italy) Flavia Pennetta	7–6^{(7–2)}, 1–6, [10–7]
Beijing Singles – Doubles	(Denmark) Caroline Wozniacki (3)	(Russia) Vera Zvonareva	6–3, 3–6, 6–3	(Belarus) Olga Govortsova*	(Argentina) Gisela Dulko (Italy) Flavia Pennetta	7–6^{(7–2)}, 1–6, [10–7]

== See also ==
- WTA Premier tournaments
- 2010 WTA Tour
- 2010 ATP Masters 1000
- 2010 ATP Tour
