= 2010 Estoril Open – Women's doubles =

Women's doubles
- 2010 Estoril Open

Final
- Champions: (Romania) Sorana Cîrstea; (Spain) Anabel Medina Garrigues
- Runners-up: (Russia) Vitalia Diatchenko; (France) Aurélie Védy
- Score: 6–1, 7–5

Events
Singles	men	women
Doubles	men	women
← 2009 ·	Estoril Open	· 2011 →

Raquel Kops-Jones and Abigail Spears were the defenders of championship title, but Kops-Jones chose to participate in Rome instead and Spears chose not to play.
Sorana Cîrstea and Anabel Medina Garrigues won in the final 6–1, 7–5, against Vitalia Diatchenko and Aurélie Védy.

== Seeds ==
1. (Romania) Sorana Cîrstea / (Spain) Anabel Medina Garrigues (champions)
2. (Hungary) Melinda Czink / (Spain) Arantxa Parra Santonja (quarterfinals)
3. (Germany) Kristina Barrois / (Germany) Jasmin Wöhr (quarterfinals)
4. (United States) Jill Craybas / (Germany) Julia Görges (first round)

== Draw ==
=== Key ===
- Q = Qualifier
- WC = Wild card
- LL = Lucky loser
- Alt = Alternate
- SE = Special exempt
- PR = Protected ranking
- ITF = ITF entry
- JE = Junior exempt
- w/o = Walkover
- r = Retired
- d = Defaulted
- SR = Special ranking

=== Draw ===
First round

Quarterfinals

Semifinals

Finals

1
(Romania) S Cîrstea
(Spain) A Medina Garrigues

- (Canada) S Fichman
- (United States) M Washington
w/o

1
(Romania) S Cîrstea
(Spain) A Medina Garrigues
6
7

WC
- (Portugal) M de Lattre
- (Portugal) R Esteves de Freitas
0
2

ALT
- (China) S Peng
- (China) S Zhang
2
6^{2}

ALT
- (China) S Peng
- (China) S Zhang
6
6

1
- (Romania) S Cîrstea
- (Spain) A Medina Garrigues
6
6

4
- (United States) J Craybas
- (Germany) J Görges
4
1

- (Russia) V Manasieva
- (Romania) IR Olaru
3
2

WC
(Portugal) M Larcher de Brito
(Netherlands) A Rus
6
6

WC
- (Portugal) M Larcher de Brito
- (Netherlands) A Rus
1
0

(Russia) V Manasieva
(Romania) IR Olaru
6
6

(Russia) V Manasieva
(Romania) IR Olaru
6
6

- (Russia) Ar Rodionova
- (Canada) A Wozniak
3
4

1
- (Romania) S Cîrstea
- (Spain) A Medina Garrigues
6
7

- (France) J Coin
- (France) C Pin
7
6^{2}
[2]

- (Russia) V Diatchenko
- (France) A Védy
1
5

(Bosnia and Herzegovina) M Jugić-Salkić
(Croatia) D Jurak
5
7
[10]

(Bosnia and Herzegovina) M Jugić-Salkić
(Croatia) D Jurak
6
7

- (Russia) N Bratchikova
- (France) S Lefèvre
1
6^{4}

3
- (Germany) K Barrois
- (Germany) J Wöhr
4
6^{4}

3
- (Germany) K Barrois
- (Germany) J Wöhr
6
7

- (Bosnia and Herzegovina) M Jugić-Salkić
- (Croatia) D Jurak
3
6
[5]

- (Russia) E Ivanova
- (Romania) M Niculescu
5
4

- (Russia) V Diatchenko
- (France) A Védy
6
4
[10]

(Russia) V Diatchenko
(France) A Védy
7
6

(Russia) V Diatchenko
(France) A Védy
7
2
[10]

- (Germany) C Klaschka
- (Austria) S Klemenschits
5
3

2
- (Hungary) M Czink
- (Spain) A Parra Santonja
5
6
[6]

2
(Hungary) M Czink
(Spain) A Parra Santonja
7
6
