= 2010 Estoril Open =

- Date: 3–9 May
- Edition: 21st (ATP) / 14th (WTA)
- Surface: Clay / outdoor
- Location: Oeiras, Portugal
- Venue: Estádio Nacional

Champions

Men's singles
- (Spain) Albert Montañés

Women's singles
- (Latvia) Anastasija Sevastova

Men's doubles
- (Spain) Marc López / (Spain) David Marrero

Women's doubles
- (Romania) Sorana Cîrstea / (Spain) Anabel Medina Garrigues
← 2009 ·	Estoril Open	· 2011 →

The 2010 Estoril Open was a tennis tournament played on outdoor clay courts. It was the 21st edition of the Estoril Open for the men (the 14th for the women), and was part of the ATP World Tour 250 series of the 2010 ATP World Tour, and of the International-level tournaments of the 2010 WTA Tour. Both the men's and the women's events took place at the Estádio Nacional in Oeiras, Portugal, from 3 May until 9 May 2010. Albert Montañés and Anastasija Sevastova won the singles title.

== Finals ==
=== Men's singles ===
(Spain) Albert Montañés defeated (Portugal) Frederico Gil, 6–2, 6–7^{(4–7)}, 7–5

- It was Montanes' first title of the year and 4th of his career. He defended his title.

=== Women's singles ===
(Latvia) Anastasija Sevastova defeated (Spain) Arantxa Parra Santonja, 6–2, 7–5

- It was Sevastova's first career title.

=== Men's doubles ===
(Spain) Marc López / (Spain) David Marrero defeated (Uruguay) Pablo Cuevas / (Spain) Marcel Granollers, 6–7^{(1–7)}, 6–4, [10–4]

=== Women's doubles ===
(Romania) Sorana Cîrstea / (Spain) Anabel Medina Garrigues defeated (Russia) Vitalia Diatchenko / (France) Aurélie Védy, 6–1, 7–5

== ATP entrants ==
=== Seeds ===
Player	Nationality	Ranking*	Seeding
Roger Federer	Switzerland	1	1
~~Ivan Ljubičić~~	~~Croatia~~	~~15~~	~~2~~
~~Gaël Monfils~~	~~France~~	~~18~~	~~3~~
Albert Montañés	Spain	31	4
Guillermo García López	Spain	42	5
Florian Mayer	Germany	48	6
Juan Ignacio Chela	Argentina	55	7
Pablo Cuevas	Uruguay	56	8

- Seedings are based on the rankings of April 26, 2010.

=== Other entrants ===
The following players received wildcards into the main draw:

- (Portugal) Rui Machado
- (France) Gaël Monfils
- (Portugal) Leonardo Tavares

The following players received entry from the qualifying draw:

- (Spain) Pablo Andújar
- (Argentina) Federico Delbonis
- (Spain) Marc López
- (Spain) Alberto Martín

The following players received the lucky loser spot:

- (Spain) David Marrero
- (Poland) Michał Przysiężny

=== Withdrawals ===
The following notable players withdrew from the event:

- (Croatia) Ivan Ljubičić (left side strain)
- (France) Gaël Monfils (stomach)

== WTA entrants ==
=== Seeds ===
Player	Nationality	Ranking*	Seeding
Ágnes Szávay	Hungary	33	1
Sorana Cîrstea	Romania	39	2
Aleksandra Wozniak	Canada	46	3
Anabel Medina Garrigues	Spain	48	4
Melinda Czink	Hungary	51	5
Magdaléna Rybáriková	Slovakia	53	6
Peng Shuai	China	54	7
Sybille Bammer	Austria	56	8

- Seedings are based on the rankings of April 26, 2010.

=== Other entrants ===
The following players received wildcards into the main draw:

- (Portugal) Magali de Lattre
- (Portugal) Maria João Koehler
- (Portugal) Michelle Larcher de Brito

The following players received entry from the qualifying draw:

- (Russia) Nina Bratchikova
- (Bulgaria) Dia Evtimova
- (Austria) Yvonne Meusburger
- (Netherlands) Arantxa Rus

The following player received the lucky loser spot:

- (Australia) Jarmila Groth
