= 2010 ATP World Tour Masters 1000 =

Men's professional tennis tour

2010 ATP Masters 1000
Details
- Duration: March 11 – November 14
- Edition: 21st
- Tournaments: 9

Achievements (singles)
- Most titles: (Spain) Rafael Nadal (3)
- Most finals: (Switzerland) Roger Federer (4)

The twenty-first edition of the ATP Masters Series. The champion of each Masters event is awarded 1,000 rankings points.

== Tournaments ==
Tournament	Country	Location	Court surface	Prize money
Indian Wells Masters	USA	Indian Wells, California	Hard	$4,702,285
Miami Open	USA	Key Biscayne, Florida	Hard	$4,500,000
Monte-Carlo Masters	France	Roquebrune-Cap-Martin	Clay	€2,750,000
Madrid Open	Spain	Madrid	Clay	€2,750,000
Italian Open	Italy	Rome	Clay	€3,700,000
Canadian Open	Canada	Toronto	Hard	$3,000,000
Cincinnati Masters	USA	Mason, Ohio	Hard	$3,000,000
Shanghai Masters	China	Shanghai	Hard	$5,250,000
Paris Masters	France	Paris	Hard (indoor)	€2,750,000

== Results ==
* First-time champion

Masters	Singles champions	Runners-up	Score	Doubles champions	Runners-up	Score
Indian Wells Singles – Doubles	(Croatia) Ivan Ljubičić*	(United States) Andy Roddick	7–6^{(7–3)}, 7–6^{(7–5)}	(Spain) Marc López*	(Canada) Daniel Nestor (Serbia) Nenad Zimonjić	7–6^{(10–8)}, 6–3
Indian Wells Singles – Doubles	(Croatia) Ivan Ljubičić*	(United States) Andy Roddick	7–6^{(7–3)}, 7–6^{(7–5)}	(Spain) Rafael Nadal	(Canada) Daniel Nestor (Serbia) Nenad Zimonjić	7–6^{(10–8)}, 6–3
Miami Singles – Doubles	(United States) Andy Roddick	(Czech Republic) Tomáš Berdych	7–5, 6–4	(Czech Republic) Lukáš Dlouhý*	(India) Mahesh Bhupathi (Belarus) Max Mirnyi	6–2, 7–5
Miami Singles – Doubles	(United States) Andy Roddick	(Czech Republic) Tomáš Berdych	7–5, 6–4	(India) Leander Paes	(India) Mahesh Bhupathi (Belarus) Max Mirnyi	6–2, 7–5
Monte Carlo Singles – Doubles	(Spain) Rafael Nadal	(Spain) Fernando Verdasco	6–0, 6–1	(Canada) Daniel Nestor (Serbia) Nenad Zimonjić	(India) Mahesh Bhupathi (Belarus) Max Mirnyi	6–3, 2–0 ret.
Rome Singles – Doubles	(Spain) Rafael Nadal	(Spain) David Ferrer	7–5, 6–2	(United States) Bob Bryan (United States) Mike Bryan	(United States) John Isner (United States) Sam Querrey	6–2, 6–3
Madrid Singles – Doubles	(Spain) Rafael Nadal	(Switzerland) Roger Federer	6–4, 7–6^{(7–5)}	(United States) Bob Bryan (United States) Mike Bryan	(Canada) Daniel Nestor (Serbia) Nenad Zimonjić	6–3, 6–4
Toronto Singles – Doubles	(United Kingdom) Andy Murray	(Switzerland) Roger Federer	7–5, 7–5	(United States) Bob Bryan (United States) Mike Bryan	(France) Julien Benneteau (France) Michaël Llodra	7–5, 6–3
Cincinnati Singles – Doubles	(Switzerland) Roger Federer	(United States) Mardy Fish	6–7^{(5–7)}, 7–6^{(7–1)}, 6–4	(United States) Bob Bryan (United States) Mike Bryan	(India) Mahesh Bhupathi (Belarus) Max Mirnyi	6–3, 6–4.
Shanghai Singles – Doubles	(United Kingdom) Andy Murray	(Switzerland) Roger Federer	6–3, 6–2	(Austria) Jürgen Melzer*	(Poland) Mariusz Fyrstenberg (Poland) Marcin Matkowski	7–5, 4–6, [10–5]
Shanghai Singles – Doubles	(United Kingdom) Andy Murray	(Switzerland) Roger Federer	6–3, 6–2	(India) Leander Paes	(Poland) Mariusz Fyrstenberg (Poland) Marcin Matkowski	7–5, 4–6, [10–5]
Paris Singles – Doubles	(Sweden) Robin Söderling*	(France) Gaël Monfils	6–1, 7–6^{(7–1)}	(India) Mahesh Bhupathi (Belarus) Max Mirnyi	(The Bahamas) Mark Knowles (Israel) Andy Ram	7–5, 7–5

== Tournament details ==
Key

- Q = Qualifier
- WC = Wild card
- LL = Lucky loser
- Alt = Alternate
- ITF = ITF entry
- PR = Protected ranking
- SR = Special ranking
- SE = Special exempt
- JE = Junior exempt
- JR = Junior Accelerator Programme entrant
- CO = College Accelerator Programme entrant
- NG = Next Gen Accelerator Program entrant
- w/o = Walkover
- r = Retired
- d = Defaulted

=== Indian Wells Masters ===
==== Singles ====
Quarterfinals
18	(Spain) Tommy Robredo	3	5
7	(United States) Andy Roddick	6	7
4	(United Kingdom) Andy Murray	1	6^{4}
6	(Sweden) Robin Söderling	6	7
19	(Czech Republic) Tomáš Berdych	4	6^{4}
3	(Spain) Rafael Nadal	6	7
21	(Argentina) Juan Mónaco	6	2	1
20	(Croatia) Ivan Ljubičić	4	6	6

Semifinals
7	(United States) Andy Roddick	6	3	6
6	(Sweden) Robin Söderling	4	6	3
3	(Spain) Rafael Nadal	6	4	6^{1}
20	(Croatia) Ivan Ljubičić	3	6	7

Final
7	(United States) Andy Roddick	6^{3}	6^{5}
20	(Croatia) Ivan Ljubičić	7	7

==== Doubles ====
Semifinals
1	(Canada) Daniel Nestor (Serbia) Nenad Zimonjić	6	6
(United States) John Isner (United States) Sam Querrey	4	2
WC	(Spain) Marc López (Spain) Rafael Nadal	6	6
6	(Sweden) Simon Aspelin (Australia) Paul Hanley	4	4

Final
1	(Canada) Daniel Nestor (Serbia) Nenad Zimonjić	6^{8}	3
WC	(Spain) Marc López (Spain) Rafael Nadal	7	6

=== Miami Open ===
==== Singles ====
Quarterfinals
16	(Czech Republic) Tomáš Berdych	4	7	6
10	(Spain) Fernando Verdasco	6	6^{5}	4
13	(Russia) Mikhail Youzhny	1	4
5	(Sweden) Robin Söderling	6	6
8	(France) Jo-Wilfried Tsonga	3	2
4	(Spain) Rafael Nadal	6	6
6	(United States) Andy Roddick	6	6
33	(Spain) Nicolás Almagro	3	3

Semifinals
16	(Czech Republic) Tomáš Berdych	6	6
5	(Sweden) Robin Söderling	2	2
4	(Spain) Rafael Nadal	6	3	3
6	(United States) Andy Roddick	4	6	6

Final
16	(Czech Republic) Tomáš Berdych	5	4
6	(United States) Andy Roddick	7	6

==== Doubles ====
Semifinals
(Spain) Nicolás Almagro (Spain) Tommy Robredo	3	0
3	(Czech Republic) Lukáš Dlouhý (India) Leander Paes	6	6
4	(India) Mahesh Bhupathi (Belarus) Max Mirnyi	7	6
8	(Poland) Mariusz Fyrstenberg (Poland) Marcin Matkowski	6^{4}	4

Final
3	(Czech Republic) Lukáš Dlouhý (India) Leander Paes	6	7
4	(India) Mahesh Bhupathi (Belarus) Max Mirnyi	2	5

=== Monte-Carlo Masters ===
==== Singles ====
Quarterfinals
1	(Serbia) Novak Djokovic	6	6
(Argentina) David Nalbandian	2	3
(Spain) Albert Montañés	3	7	0
6	(Spain) Fernando Verdasco	6	6^{4}	6
11	(Spain) David Ferrer	7	7
(Germany) Philipp Kohlschreiber	5	6^{1}
9	(Spain) Juan Carlos Ferrero	4	2
2	(Spain) Rafael Nadal	6	6

Semifinals
1	(Serbia) Novak Djokovic	2	2
6	(Spain) Fernando Verdasco	6	6
11	(Spain) David Ferrer	2	3
2	(Spain) Rafael Nadal	6	6

Final
6	(Spain) Fernando Verdasco	0	1
2	(Spain) Rafael Nadal	6	6

==== Doubles ====
Semifinals
1	(Canada) Daniel Nestor (Serbia) Nenad Zimonjić	6	6
4	(South Africa) Wesley Moodie (Belgium) Dick Norman	0	4
7	(Sweden) Simon Aspelin (Australia) Paul Hanley	3	6^{3}
5	(India) Mahesh Bhupathi (Belarus) Max Mirnyi	6	7

Final
1	(Canada) Daniel Nestor (Serbia) Nenad Zimonjić	6	2
5	(India) Mahesh Bhupathi (Belarus) Max Mirnyi	3	0^{r}

=== Italian Open ===
==== Singles ====
Quarterfinals
(Latvia) Ernests Gulbis	7	6
(Spain) Feliciano López	6^{6}	1
3	(Spain) Rafael Nadal	6	6
(Switzerland) Stanislas Wawrinka	4	1
7	(France) Jo-Wilfried Tsonga	4	1
13	(Spain) David Ferrer	6	6
6	(Spain) Fernando Verdasco	7	3	6
2	(Serbia) Novak Djokovic	6^{4}	6	4

Semifinals
(Latvia) Ernests Gulbis	4	6	4
3	(Spain) Rafael Nadal	6	3	6
13	(Spain) David Ferrer	7	6
6	(Spain) Fernando Verdasco	5	3

Final
3	(Spain) Rafael Nadal	7	6
13	(Spain) David Ferrer	5	2

==== Doubles ====
Semifinals
(Uruguay) Pablo Cuevas (Argentina) Juan Mónaco	6^{5}	6^{2}
(United States) John Isner (United States) Sam Querrey	7	7
7	(Poland) Łukasz Kubot (Austria) Oliver Marach	1	2
2	(United States) Bob Bryan (United States) Mike Bryan	6	6

Final
(United States) John Isner (United States) Sam Querrey	2	3
2	(United States) Bob Bryan (United States) Mike Bryan	6	6

=== Madrid Open ===
==== Singles ====
Quarterfinals
1	(Switzerland) Roger Federer	6	6
(Switzerland) Stanislas Wawrinka	3	1
3	(United Kingdom) Andy Murray	5	3
9	(Spain) David Ferrer	7	6
(Austria) Jürgen Melzer	3	1
(Spain) Nicolás Almagro	6	6
12	(France) Gaël Monfils	1	3
2	(Spain) Rafael Nadal	6	6

Semifinals
1	(Switzerland) Roger Federer	7	3	6
9	(Spain) David Ferrer	5	6	3
(Spain) Nicolás Almagro	6	2	2
2	(Spain) Rafael Nadal	4	6	6

Final
1	(Switzerland) Roger Federer	4	6^{5}
2	(Spain) Rafael Nadal	6	7

==== Doubles ====
Semifinals
1	(Canada) Daniel Nestor (Serbia) Nenad Zimonjić	6	6
3	(Czech Republic) Lukáš Dlouhý (India) Leander Paes	3	4
(Spain) Marcel Granollers (Serbia) Viktor Troicki	0	6	[2]
2	(United States) Bob Bryan (United States) Mike Bryan	6	4	[10]

Final
1	(Canada) Daniel Nestor (Serbia) Nenad Zimonjić	3	4
2	(United States) Bob Bryan (United States) Mike Bryan	6	6

=== Canadian Open ===
==== Singles ====
Quarterfinals
1	(Spain) Rafael Nadal	3	6	6
(Germany) Philipp Kohlschreiber	6	3	4
4	(United Kingdom) Andy Murray	6	6
PR	(Argentina) David Nalbandian	2	2
7	(Czech Republic) Tomáš Berdych	3	7	6^{5}
3	(Switzerland) Roger Federer	6	5	7
(France) Jérémy Chardy	2	3
2	(Serbia) Novak Djokovic	6	6

Semifinals
1	(Spain) Rafael Nadal	3	4
4	(United Kingdom) Andy Murray	6	6
3	(Switzerland) Roger Federer	6	3	7
2	(Serbia) Novak Djokovic	1	6	5

Final
4	(United Kingdom) Andy Murray	7	7
3	(Switzerland) Roger Federer	5	5

==== Doubles ====
Semifinals
(Czech Republic) František Čermák (Slovakia) Michal Mertiňák	6^{5}	4
(France) Julien Benneteau (France) Michaël Llodra	7	6
4	(India) Mahesh Bhupathi (Belarus) Max Mirnyi	6	3	[4]
2	(United States) Bob Bryan (United States) Mike Bryan	4	6	[10]

Final
(France) Julien Benneteau (France) Michaël Llodra	5	3
2	(United States) Bob Bryan (United States) Mike Bryan	7	6

=== Cincinnati Masters ===
==== Singles ====
Quarterfinals
1	(Spain) Rafael Nadal	4	6	4
(Cyprus) Marcos Baghdatis	6	4	6
3	(Switzerland) Roger Federer	6	7
6	(Russia) Nikolay Davydenko	4	5
WC	(United States) Mardy Fish	6^{7}	6	7
4	(United Kingdom) Andy Murray	7	1	6^{5}
9	(United States) Andy Roddick	6	7
2	(Serbia) Novak Djokovic	4	5

Semifinals
(Cyprus) Marcos Baghdatis	4	3
3	(Switzerland) Roger Federer	6	6
WC	(United States) Mardy Fish	4	7	6
9	(United States) Andy Roddick	6	6^{3}	1

Final
3	(Switzerland) Roger Federer	6^{5}	7	6
WC	(United States) Mardy Fish	7	6^{1}	4

==== Doubles ====
Semifinals
5	(Poland) Łukasz Kubot (Austria) Oliver Marach	3	4
4	(India) Mahesh Bhupathi (Belarus) Max Mirnyi	6	6
(South Africa) Wesley Moodie (Belgium) Dick Norman	6^{8}	5
2	(United States) Bob Bryan (United States) Mike Bryan	7	7

Final
4	(India) Mahesh Bhupathi (Belarus) Max Mirnyi	3	4
2	(United States) Bob Bryan (United States) Mike Bryan	6	6

=== Shanghai Masters ===
==== Singles ====
Quarterfinals
13	(Austria) Jürgen Melzer	7	5	2
(Argentina) Juan Mónaco	6^{6}	7	6
4	(United Kingdom) Andy Murray	6	6
12	(France) Jo-Wilfried Tsonga	2	2
5	(Sweden) Robin Söderling	1	1
3	(Switzerland) Roger Federer	6	6
(Spain) Guillermo García-López	2	3
2	(Serbia) Novak Djokovic	6	6

Semifinals
(Argentina) Juan Mónaco	4	1
4	(United Kingdom) Andy Murray	6	6
3	(Switzerland) Roger Federer	7	6
2	(Serbia) Novak Djokovic	5	4

Final
4	(United Kingdom) Andy Murray	6	6
3	(Switzerland) Roger Federer	3	2

==== Doubles ====
Semifinals
1	(United States) Bob Bryan (United States) Mike Bryan	5	1
3	(Austria) Jürgen Melzer (India) Leander Paes	7	6
4	(Poland) Łukasz Kubot (Austria) Oliver Marach	6^{7}	6	[6]
6	(Poland) Mariusz Fyrstenberg (Poland) Marcin Matkowski	7	1	[10]

Final
3	(Austria) Jürgen Melzer (India) Leander Paes	7	4	[10]
6	(Poland) Mariusz Fyrstenberg (Poland) Marcin Matkowski	5	6	[5]

=== Paris Masters ===
==== Singles ====
Quarterfinals
1	(Switzerland) Roger Federer	6	7
11	(Austria) Jürgen Melzer	1	6^{4}
3	(United Kingdom) Andy Murray	2	6	3
12	(France) Gaël Monfils	6	2	6
8	(United States) Andy Roddick	5	4
4	(Sweden) Robin Söderling	7	6
10	(Russia) Nikolay Davydenko	5	1
(France) Michaël Llodra	7	6

Semifinals
1	(Switzerland) Roger Federer	6^{7}	7	6^{4}
12	(France) Gaël Monfils	7	6^{1}	7
4	(Sweden) Robin Söderling	6^{0}	7	7
(France) Michaël Llodra	7	5	6^{6}

Final
12	(France) Gaël Monfils	1	6^{1}
4	(Sweden) Robin Söderling	6	7

==== Doubles ====
Semifinals
1	(United States) Bob Bryan (United States) Mike Bryan	3	7	[6]
(The Bahamas) Mark Knowles (Israel) Andy Ram	6	6^{5}	[10]
8	(Czech Republic) František Čermák (Slovakia) Michal Mertiňák	3	3
6	(India) Mahesh Bhupathi (Belarus) Max Mirnyi	6	6

Final
(The Bahamas) Mark Knowles (Israel) Andy Ram	5	5
6	(India) Mahesh Bhupathi (Belarus) Max Mirnyi	7	7

== See also ==
- ATP Tour Masters 1000
- 2010 ATP Tour
- 2010 WTA Premier Mandatory and Premier 5 tournaments
- 2010 WTA Tour
