= 2010 Masters =

2010 Masters may refer to:

- 2010 Masters Tournament, golf
- 2010 Masters (snooker)
- 2010 Monte-Carlo Rolex Masters, tennis
- 2010 ATP World Tour Masters 1000, tennis
- 2010 Deutsche Tourenwagen Masters season, touring car racing
- 2010 Masters of Formula 3
- 2010 International Formula Master season, motor racing
- 2010 ADAC Formel Masters season, open wheel racing
- 2010 Radical European Masters, motor racing
- 2010 National Masters, English indoor football
