= 2011 Estoril Open – Men's singles qualifying =

This article displays the qualifying draw of the 2011 Estoril Open.

== Players ==
=== Seeds ===
1. (Spain) Albert Ramos (qualifying competition)
2. (France) Édouard Roger-Vasselin (qualified)
3. (Spain) Daniel Muñoz de la Nava (qualifying competition)
4. (Italy) Flavio Cipolla (qualified)
5. (France) Marc Gicquel (qualifying competition)
6. (Italy) Simone Vagnozzi (first round)
7. (Spain) Guillermo Olaso (first round)
8. (Colombia) Carlos Salamanca (first round)

=== Qualifiers ===
1. (Portugal) Pedro Sousa
2. (France) Édouard Roger-Vasselin
3. (Denmark) Frederik Nielsen
4. (Italy) Flavio Cipolla

== Qualifying draw ==
=== First qualifier ===
First round
1 | (Spain) Albert Ramos | 6 | 6
WC | (Portugal) Gonçalo Falcão | 4 | 4
(Italy) Filippo Leonardi | 2 | 2
(Spain) Pablo Martín-Adalia | 6 | 6
(Portugal) Pedro Sousa | 6 | 6
(Portugal) Gonçalo Pereira | 0 | 4
(Russia) Andrey Kumantsov | 4 | 6 | 7
6 | (Italy) Simone Vagnozzi | 6 | 3 | 5

Second round
1 | (Spain) Albert Ramos | 7^{7} | 6
(Spain) Pablo Martín-Adalia | 6^{4} | 3
(Portugal) Pedro Sousa | 6 | 2 | 6
(Russia) Andrey Kumantsov | 3 | 6 | 3

Qualifying competition
1 | (Spain) Albert Ramos | 6 | 5 | 5
(Portugal) Pedro Sousa | 4 | 7 | 7

=== Second qualifier ===
First round
2 | (France) Édouard Roger-Vasselin | 6 | 6
(Spain) Iván Navarro | 3 | 4
(Netherlands) Antal van der Duim | 2 | 3
(Canada) Peter Polansky | 6 | 6
(Spain) Sergio Gutiérrez Ferrol | 6 | 6
(Republic of Ireland) Barry King | 1 | 4
(Chinese Taipei) Yang Tsung-hua | 4 | 6 | 5
5 | (France) Marc Gicquel | 6 | 3 | 7

Second round
2 | (France) Édouard Roger-Vasselin | 6 | 6
(Canada) Peter Polansky | 4 | 4
(Spain) Sergio Gutiérrez Ferrol | 1 | 4r
5 | (France) Marc Gicquel | 6 | 3

Qualifying competition
2 | (France) Édouard Roger-Vasselin | 6 | 6
5 | (France) Marc Gicquel | 3 | 4

=== Third qualifier ===
First round
3 | (Spain) Daniel Muñoz de la Nava | 6 | 6
WC | (Portugal) Frederico Ferreira Silva | 1 | 0
(United States) Michael Yani | 4
(Portugal) Leonardo Tavares | 4^{r}
WC | (Portugal) Diogo Rocha | 1 | 4
(Portugal) Francisco Dias | 6 | 6
(Denmark) Frederik Nielsen | 6 | 6
8 | (Colombia) Carlos Salamanca | 4 | 4

Second round
3 | (Spain) Daniel Muñoz de la Nava | 6 | 6
(United States) Michael Yani | 0 | 3
(Portugal) Francisco Dias | 4 | 1
(Denmark) Frederik Nielsen | 6 | 6

Qualifying competition
3 | (Spain) Daniel Muñoz de la Nava | 6 | 4 | 2
(Denmark) Frederik Nielsen | 4 | 6 | 6

=== Fourth qualifier ===
First round
4 | (Italy) Flavio Cipolla | 6 | 6
(Brazil) Tiago Fernandes | 1 | 0
WC | (Portugal) João Domingues | 0 | 2
(Spain) David Marrero | 6 | 6
(Spain) Pablo Carreño Busta | 6 | 6
(Republic of Ireland) Daniel Glancy | 0 | 0
(Spain) Adrián Menéndez | 6 | 6
7 | (Spain) Guillermo Olaso | 1 | 2

Second round
4 | (Italy) Flavio Cipolla | 6^{4} | 6 | 6
(Spain) David Marrero | 7^{7} | 3 | 2
(Spain) Pablo Carreño Busta | 7^{8} | 6
(Spain) Adrián Menéndez | 6^{6} | 1

Qualifying competition
4 | (Italy) Flavio Cipolla | 6 | 6
(Spain) Pablo Carreño Busta | 0 | 3
