= 2011 Estoril Open – Women's singles =

Women's singles
- 2011 Estoril Open

Final
- Champion: (Spain) Anabel Medina Garrigues
- Runner-up: (Germany) Kristina Barrois
- Score: 6–1, 6–2

Events
Singles	men	women
Doubles	men	women
- Estoril Open

Anastasija Sevastova was the defending champion, but lost in the first round to Urszula Radwańska.

Anabel Medina Garrigues won in the final against Kristina Barrois, 6–1, 6–2.

== Seeds ==
1. (Russia) Alisa Kleybanova (quarterfinals)
2. (Australia) Jarmila Gajdošová (quarterfinals)
3. (Czech Republic) Klára Zakopalová (quarterfinals)
4. (Latvia) Anastasija Sevastova (first round)
5. (United States) Bethanie Mattek-Sands (first round)
6. (Russia) Elena Vesnina (second round)
7. (China) Zheng Jie (first round)
8. (Hungary) Gréta Arn (second round, retired)

== Draw ==
Key

- Q = Qualifier
- WC = Wild card
- LL = Lucky loser
- Alt = Alternate
- ITF = ITF entry
- PR = Protected ranking
- SR = Special ranking
- SE = Special exempt
- JE = Junior exempt
- JR = Junior Accelerator Programme entrant
- CO = College Accelerator Programme entrant
- NG = Next Gen Accelerator Program entrant
- w/o = Walkover
- r = Retired
- d = Defaulted

=== Finals ===
Semifinals
(Germany) Kristina Barrois	7	6
(Sweden) Johanna Larsson	6^{2}	4
(Spain) Anabel Medina Garrigues	6	6
(Romania) Monica Niculescu	1	3

Final
(Germany) Kristina Barrois	1	2
(Spain) Anabel Medina Garrigues	6	6

=== Top half ===
First round
1	(Russia) A Kleybanova	6	6
(Belarus) O Govortsova	2	2
(Russia) K Pervak	4	3
(France) M Johansson	6	6
(Sweden) S Arvidsson	3	1
(Germany) K Barrois	6	6
WC	(Portugal) B Luz	1	1
6	(Russia) E Vesnina	6	6
4	(Latvia) A Sevastova	7	6^{5}	1
PR	(Poland) U Radwańska	5	7	6
WC	(Portugal) M de Lattre	3	1
(Sweden) J Larsson	6	6
(Australia) A Rodionova	6	6^{5}	4
(Russia) A Kudryavtseva	1	7	6
(Italy) R Oprandi	6	6
7	(China) J Zheng	4	2

Second round
1	(Russia) A Kleybanova	5	6	6
(France) M Johansson	7	3	2
(Germany) K Barrois	6	6
6	(Russia) E Vesnina	4	3
PR	(Poland) U Radwańska	4	4
(Sweden) J Larsson	6	6
(Russia) A Kudryavtseva	6	7
(Italy) R Oprandi	4	6^{3}

Quarterfinals
1	(Russia) A Kleybanova	4	2
(Germany) K Barrois	6	6
(Sweden) J Larsson	6	7
(Russia) A Kudryavtseva	2	5

Semifinals
(Germany) K Barrois	7	6
(Sweden) J Larsson	6^{2}	4

=== Bottom half ===
First round
8	(Hungary) G Arn	6	3	6
WC	(Portugal) MJ Köhler	2	6	3
(Romania) S Halep	6^{5}	6^{5}
(Spain) A Medina Garrigues	7	7
Q	(Austria) T Paszek	7	0^{r}
Q	(Belarus) A Yakimova	5	4
Q	(Spain) B García Vidagany	4	6^{3}
3	(Czech Republic) K Zakopalová	6	7
5	(United States) B Mattek-Sands	4	7	3
(Romania) M Niculescu	6	5	6
Q	(United States) S Stephens	6	6
(United States) M Oudin	2	1
(China) S Zhang	2	1
PR	(Australia) C Dellacqua	6	6
(Czech Republic) R Voráčová	4	0
2	(Australia) J Gajdošová	6	6

Second round
8	(Hungary) G Arn	2	0^{r}
(Spain) A Medina Garrigues	6	1
Q	(Belarus) A Yakimova	6	4	1
3	(Czech Republic) K Zakopalová	2	6	6
(Romania) M Niculescu	6	6
Q	(United States) S Stephens	4	4
PR	(Australia) C Dellacqua	2	4
2	(Australia) J Gajdošová	6	6

Quarterfinals
(Spain) A Medina Garrigues	6	7
3	(Czech Republic) K Zakopalová	3	5
(Romania) M Niculescu	5	6	6
2	(Australia) J Gajdošová	7	4	2

Semifinals
(Spain) A Medina Garrigues	6	6
(Romania) M Niculescu	1	3
