= 2010 Estoril Open – Women's singles =

Women's singles
- 2010 Estoril Open

Final
- Champion: (Latvia) Anastasija Sevastova
- Runner-up: (Spain) Arantxa Parra Santonja
- Score: 6–2, 7–5

Events
Singles	men	women
Doubles	men	women
- Estoril Open

Yanina Wickmayer was the defending champion, but she chose to play in Rome rather than defend 2009 title here.

Anastasija Sevastova won her first WTA singles title, defeating Arantxa Parra Santonja in the final 6–2, 7–5.

== Seeds ==
1. (Hungary) Ágnes Szávay (first round)
2. (Romania) Sorana Cîrstea (semifinals)
3. (Canada) Aleksandra Wozniak (first round)
4. (Spain) Anabel Medina Garrigues (quarterfinals)
5. (Hungary) Melinda Czink (first round)
6. (Slovakia) Magdaléna Rybáriková (first round)
7. (China) Peng Shuai (semifinals)
8. (Austria) Sybille Bammer (first round)

== Draw ==
Key

- Q = Qualifier
- WC = Wild card
- LL = Lucky loser
- Alt = Alternate
- ITF = ITF entry
- PR = Protected ranking
- SR = Special ranking
- SE = Special exempt
- JE = Junior exempt
- JR = Junior Accelerator Programme entrant
- CO = College Accelerator Programme entrant
- NG = Next Gen Accelerator Program entrant
- w/o = Walkover
- r = Retired
- d = Defaulted

=== Finals ===
Semifinals
(Latvia) Anastasija Sevastova	6^{6}	6	6
7	(China) Peng Shuai	7	1	3
(Spain) Arantxa Parra Santonja	6	6
2	(Romania) Sorana Cîrstea	1	4

Final
(Latvia) Anastasija Sevastova	6	7
(Spain) Arantxa Parra Santonja	2	5

=== Top half ===
First round
1	(Hungary) Á Szávay	6	3	3
(Latvia) A Sevastova	3	6	6
(Croatia) P Martić	7	5	6^{2}
(Japan) K Date-Krumm	6^{4}	7	7
(Australia) A Rodionova	4	6	6
Q	(Austria) Y Meusburger	6	2	1
(Switzerland) S Vögele	6	6
5	(Hungary) M Czink	4	3
4	(Spain) A Medina Garrigues	6	6
WC	(Portugal) M de Lattre	0	0
Q	(Russia) N Bratchikova	2	7	2
(Russia) E Makarova	6	5	6
(Germany) T Malek	6	7
(Czech Republic) K Zakopalová	4	5
(France) J Coin	2	2
7	(China) S Peng	6	6

Second round
(Latvia) A Sevastova	6	4
(Japan) K Date-Krumm	1	2	r
(Australia) A Rodionova	6	2	6
(Switzerland) S Vögele	4	6	3
4	(Spain) A Medina Garrigues	6	6
(Russia) E Makarova	2	3
(Germany) T Malek	2	1
7	(China) S Peng	6	6

Quarterfinals
(Latvia) A Sevastova	7	6
(Australia) A Rodionova	6^{6}	2
4	(Spain) A Medina Garrigues	6	4	3
7	(China) S Peng	4	6	6

Semifinals
(Latvia) A Sevastova	6^{6}	6	6
7	(China) S Peng	7	1	3

=== Bottom half ===
First round
6	(Slovakia) M Rybáriková	4	3
LL	(Australia) J Groth	6	6
(Germany) K Barrois	6	6
(United States) J Craybas	0	2
Q	(Bulgaria) D Evtimova	6	2	4
(Spain) A Parra Santonja	2	6	6
(Germany) J Görges	6	6
3	(Canada) A Wozniak	1	1
8	(Austria) S Bammer	1	3
(Belgium) K Flipkens	6	6
Q	(Netherlands) A Rus	6	3	7
WC	(Portugal) MJ Koehler	3	6	5
(France) A Cornet	3	6	3
WC	(Portugal) M Larcher de Brito	6	4	6
(Romania) IR Olaru	3	6	1
2	(Romania) S Cîrstea	6	3	6

Second round
LL	(Australia) J Groth	2	6	7
(Germany) K Barrois	6	1	5
(Spain) A Parra Santonja	3	7	6
(Germany) J Görges	6	5	2
(Belgium) K Flipkens	6^{4}	1
Q	(Netherlands) A Rus	7	6
WC	(Portugal) M Larcher de Brito	5	5
2	(Romania) S Cîrstea	7	7

Quarterfinals
LL	(Australia) J Groth	7	5	5
(Spain) A Parra Santonja	6^{6}	7	7
Q	(Netherlands) A Rus	4	1
2	(Romania) S Cîrstea	6	6

Semifinals
(Spain) A Parra Santonja	6	6
2	(Romania) S Cîrstea	1	4
