= 2011 Estoril Open – Women's doubles =

Women's doubles
- 2011 Estoril Open

Final
- Champions: (Russia) Alisa Kleybanova (Kazakhstan) Galina Voskoboeva
- Runners-up: (Greece) Eleni Daniilidou (Netherlands) Michaëlla Krajicek
- Score: 6–4, 6–2

Events
Singles	men	women
Doubles	men	women
← 2010 ·	Estoril Open	· 2012 →

Sorana Cîrstea and Anabel Medina Garrigues were the defending champions, but Cîrstea decided not to participate.
Medina Garrigues played alongside Renata Voráčová. They lost to Eleni Daniilidou and Michaëlla Krajicek in the quarterfinal.
Alisa Kleybanova and Galina Voskoboeva became the champions, beating Daniilidou and Krajicek 6–4, 6–2 in the final.

== Seeds ==
1. (Spain) Anabel Medina Garrigues/ (Czech Republic) Renata Voráčová (quarterfinals)
2. (United States) Raquel Kops-Jones / (United States) Abigail Spears (semifinals)
3. (China) Yan Zi / (China) Zhang Shuai (first round)
4. (Germany) Kristina Barrois / (Germany) Jasmin Wöhr (quarterfinals)

== Draw ==
=== Key ===
- Q = Qualifier
- WC = Wild card
- LL = Lucky loser
- Alt = Alternate
- SE = Special exempt
- PR = Protected ranking
- ITF = ITF entry
- JE = Junior exempt
- w/o = Walkover
- r = Retired
- d = Defaulted
- SR = Special ranking

=== Draw ===
First round
1	(Spain) A Medina Garrigues (Czech Republic) R Voráčová	6	6
WC	(Russia) E Ivanova (Portugal) MJ Koehler	2	4
WC	(Portugal) M de Lattre (Israel) J Glushko	6^{0}	2
(Greece) E Daniilidou (Netherlands) M Krajicek	7	6
3	(China) Z Yan (China) S Zhang	6	1	[6]
(Australia) An Rodionova (Russia) Ar Rodionova	4	6	[10]
(Croatia) P Martić (Poland) U Radwańska	0	6^{1}
(Bosnia and Herzegovina) M Jugić-Salkić (Croatia) D Jurak	6	7
(Russia) A Kleybanova (Kazakhstan) G Voskoboeva	6	0	[11]
(Turkey) İ Şenoğlu (Tunisia) S Sfar	0	6	[9]
Alt	(China) S Sun (China) Y Xu	1	3
4	(Germany) K Barrois (Germany) J Wöhr	6	6
(Australia) J Gajdošová (Czech Republic) K Zakopalová	6	6
(Romania) M Niculescu (Netherlands) A Rus	2	3
(Russia) A Panova (Belarus) T Poutchek	3	3
2	(United States) R Kops-Jones (United States) A Spears	6	6

Quarterfinals
1	(Spain) A Medina Garrigues (Czech Republic) R Voráčová	5	4
(Greece) E Daniilidou (Netherlands) M Krajicek	7	6
(Australia) An Rodionova (Russia) Ar Rodionova
(Bosnia and Herzegovina) M Jugić-Salkić (Croatia) D Jurak	w/o
(Russia) A Kleybanova (Kazakhstan) G Voskoboeva	6	7
4	(Germany) K Barrois (Germany) J Wöhr	3	5
(Australia) J Gajdošová (Czech Republic) K Zakopalová	6	6^{8}	[8]
2	(United States) R Kops-Jones (United States) A Spears	0	7	[10]

Semifinals
(Greece) E Daniilidou (Netherlands) M Krajicek	3	6	[10]
(Bosnia and Herzegovina) M Jugić-Salkić (Croatia) D Jurak	6	1	[6]
(Russia) A Kleybanova (Kazakhstan) G Voskoboeva	6	6
2	(United States) R Kops-Jones (United States) A Spears	4	3

Finals
(Greece) E Daniilidou (Netherlands) M Krajicek	4	2
(Russia) A Kleybanova (Kazakhstan) G Voskoboeva	6	6
