= 2011 Estoril Open – Men's doubles =

Men's doubles
- 2011 Estoril Open

Final
- Champions: (United States) Eric Butorac; (Curaçao) Jean-Julien Rojer
- Runners-up: (Spain) Marc López; (Spain) David Marrero
- Score: 6–3, 6–4

Events
Singles	men	women
Doubles	men	women
← 2010 ·	Estoril Open	· 2012 →

Marc López and David Marrero were the defending champions. They reached the final, where they lost to Eric Butorac and Jean-Julien Rojer 3–6, 4–6.

== Seeds ==
1. (India) Rohan Bopanna / (Pakistan) Aisam-ul-Haq Qureshi (semifinals)
2. (Brazil) Marcelo Melo / (Brazil) Bruno Soares (first round)
3. (United States) Eric Butorac / (Curaçao) Jean-Julien Rojer (champions)
4. (Spain) Marc López / (Spain) David Marrero (final)

== Draw ==
=== Key ===
- Q = Qualifier
- WC = Wild card
- LL = Lucky loser
- Alt = Alternate
- SE = Special exempt
- PR = Protected ranking
- ITF = ITF entry
- JE = Junior exempt
- w/o = Walkover
- r = Retired
- d = Defaulted
- SR = Special ranking

=== Draw ===
First round

Quarterfinals

Semifinals

Final

1
- (India) R Bopanna
- (Pakistan) A-u-H Qureshi
7
6

- (United States) S Lipsky
- (United States) T Rettenmaier
6^{1}
4

1
- (India) R Bopanna
- (Pakistan) A-u-H Qureshi
w/o

- (Spain) P Andújar
- (Spain) D Gimeno Traver
6
6

- (Spain) P Andújar
- (Spain) D Gimeno Traver

- (Switzerland) Y Allegro
- (France) G Simon
3
3

1
- (India) R Bopanna
- (Pakistan) A-u-H Qureshi
2
4

3
- (United States) E Butorac
- (Curaçao) J-J Rojer
6
6

3
- (United States) E Butorac
- (Curaçao) J-J Rojer
6
6

- (Portugal) F Gil
- (Portugal) L Tavares
4
2

3
- (United States) E Butorac
- (Curaçao) J-J Rojer
6
6

WC
- (Portugal) R Machado
- (Portugal) J Sousa
5
1

- (Uruguay) P Cuevas
- (Romania) V Hănescu
3
3

- (Uruguay) P Cuevas
- (Romania) V Hănescu
7
6

3
- (United States) E Butorac
- (Curaçao) J-J Rojer
6
6

- (France) J Chardy
- (France) É Roger-Vasselin
4
7
[10]

4
- (Spain) M López
- (Spain) D Marrero
3
4

WC
- (Portugal) G Elias
- (Portugal) P Sousa
6
5
[6]

- (France) J Chardy
- (France) É Roger-Vasselin
6^{8}
6
[8]

- (Sweden) J Brunström
- (Denmark) F Nielsen
6
4
[7]

4
- (Spain) M López
- (Spain) D Marrero
7
3
[10]

4
- (Spain) M López
- (Spain) D Marrero
4
6
[10]

4
- (Spain) M López
- (Spain) D Marrero
6
6

- (South Africa) K Anderson
- (United States) B Battistone
7
5
[13]

- (Argentina) C Berlocq
- (Spain) P Riba
3
3

- (United Kingdom) J Delgado
- (United Kingdom) J Marray
6^{3}
7
[11]

- (South Africa) K Anderson
- (United States) B Battistone
2
4

- (Argentina) C Berlocq
- (Spain) P Riba
6
6

- (Argentina) C Berlocq
- (Spain) P Riba
6
6

2
- (Brazil) M Melo
- (Brazil) B Soares
2
3
