= 2009 Estoril Open – Men's singles =

Men's singles
- 2009 Estoril Open

Final
- Champion: (Spain) Albert Montañés
- Runner-up: (United States) James Blake
- Score: 5–7, 7–6^{(8–6)}, 6–0

Events
Singles	men	women
Doubles	men	women
← 2008 ·	Estoril Open	· 2010 →

Roger Federer was the defending champion, but chose not to play that year. Albert Montañés won the title, notably by saving match points in quarterfinal and final match.

== Seeds ==
1. (France) Gilles Simon (quarterfinals)
2. (Russia) Nikolay Davydenko (semifinals)
3. (Spain) David Ferrer (second round)
4. (United States) James Blake (final)
5. (Argentina) David Nalbandian (first round)
6. (United States) Mardy Fish (quarterfinals)
7. (Spain) Albert Montañés (champion)
8. (France) Florent Serra (quarterfinals)

== Draw ==
=== Key ===
- Q = Qualifier
- WC = Wild card
- LL = Lucky loser
- Alt = Alternate
- SE = Special exempt
- PR = Protected ranking
- ITF = ITF entry
- JE = Junior exempt
- w/o = Walkover
- r = Retired
- d = Defaulted
- SR = Special ranking

=== Finals ===
Semifinals
7	(Spain) Albert Montañés	6	6
(Chile) Paul Capdeville	3	4
4	(United States) James Blake	6^{3}	7^{7}	6
2	(Russia) Nikolay Davydenko	7^{7}	6^{2}	3

Final
7	(Spain) Albert Montañés	5	7^{8}	6
4	(United States) James Blake	7	6^{6}	0

=== Top half ===
First round
1/WC	(France) G Simon	6	7^{9}
(United States) R Kendrick	3	6^{7}
(Italy) F Fognini	6	6
WC	(Argentina) G Gaudio	3	4
(Germany) S Greul	6	6
Q	(Brazil) R Hocevar	1	4
Q	(United States) R Sweeting	1	6^{4}
7	(Spain) A Montañés	6	7^{7}
3	(Spain) D Ferrer	6	6
(Spain) D Gimeno Traver	4	1
(Spain) Ó Hernández	7	1	7
WC	(Portugal) R Machado	5	6	5
(Spain) G García López	4	3
(Argentina) M González	6	6
(Chile) P Capdeville	6	6
5	(Argentina) D Nalbandian	2	2

Second round
1/WC	(France) G Simon	6	7
(Italy) F Fognini	0	5
(Germany) S Greul	2	2
7	(Spain) A Montañés	6	6
3	(Spain) D Ferrer	2	4
(Spain) Ó Hernández	6	6
(Argentina) M González	6	2	3
(Chile) P Capdeville	2	6	6

Quarterfinals
1/WC	(France) G Simon	7	4	6^{4}
7	(Spain) A Montañés	5	6	7^{7}
(Spain) Ó Hernández	6	1	4
(Chile) P Capdeville	4	6	6

Semifinals
7	(Spain) A Montañés	6	6
(Chile) P Capdeville	3	4

=== Bottom half ===
First round
8	(France) F Serra	6	2	6
(Argentina) D Junqueira	4	6	3
(Argentina) J Mónaco	6	6
Q	(Uruguay) P Cuevas	2	4
(Spain) P Andújar	6^{6}	4
(France) M Gicquel	7^{8}	6
(Portugal) F Gil	7	4	2
4	(United States) J Blake	5	6	6
6	(United States) M Fish	6	6
(Russia) T Gabashvili	3	4
(Spain) I Navarro	7	6
(Spain) A Martín	5	4
(Spain) JC Ferrero	7^{7}	6
Q	(Kazakhstan) M Kukushkin	6^{4}	3
(Kazakhstan) A Golubev	1	6^{4}
2	(Russia) N Davydenko	6	7^{7}

Second round
8	(France) F Serra	6	1	6
(Argentina) J Mónaco	3	6	3
(France) M Gicquel	6^{6}	2
4	(United States) J Blake	7^{8}	6
6	(United States) M Fish	2	6	6
(Spain) I Navarro	6	1	4
(Spain) JC Ferrero	5	2
2	(Russia) N Davydenko	7	6

Quarterfinals
8	(France) F Serra	4	1
4	(United States) J Blake	6	6
6	(United States) M Fish	4	3
2	(Russia) N Davydenko	6	6

Semifinals
4	(United States) J Blake	6^{3}	7^{7}	6
2	(Russia) N Davydenko	7^{7}	6^{2}	3
