= 2010 Estoril Open – Men's doubles =

Men's doubles
- 2010 Estoril Open

Final
- Champions: (Spain) Marc López; (Spain) David Marrero
- Runners-up: (Uruguay) Pablo Cuevas; (Spain) Marcel Granollers
- Score: 6–7^{(1–7)}, 6–4, [10–4]

Events
Singles	men	women
Doubles	men	women
← 2009 ·	Estoril Open	· 2011 →

Eric Butorac and Scott Lipsky were the defending champions, but they chose to compete in Munich instead.
Marc López and David Marrero won in the final 6–7^{(1–7)}, 6–4, [10–4], against Pablo Cuevas and Marcel Granollers.

== Seeds ==
1. (Uruguay) Pablo Cuevas / (Spain) Marcel Granollers (finals)
2. (Czech Republic) Martin Damm / (Slovakia) Filip Polášek (first round)
3. (France) Arnaud Clément / (Sweden) Robert Lindstedt (quarterfinals)
4. (United Kingdom) Colin Fleming / (United Kingdom) Ken Skupski (first round)

== Draw ==
=== Key ===
- Q = Qualifier
- WC = Wild card
- LL = Lucky loser
- Alt = Alternate
- SE = Special exempt
- PR = Protected ranking
- ITF = ITF entry
- JE = Junior exempt
- w/o = Walkover
- r = Retired
- d = Defaulted
- SR = Special ranking

=== Draw ===
First round

Quarterfinals

Semifinals

Finals

1
- (Uruguay) P Cuevas
- (Spain) M Granollers
6
6

- (Argentina) JI Chela
- (Chile) N Massú
3
3

1
- (Uruguay) P Cuevas
- (Spain) M Granollers
6
6

- (Colombia) S Giraldo
- (Colombia) A Falla
2
6
[7]

- (Spain) G García López
- (Spain) A Montañés
4
4

(Spain) G García López
(Spain) A Montañés
6
2
[10]

1
- (Uruguay) P Cuevas
- (Spain) M Granollers
6
6

4
- (United Kingdom) C Fleming
- (United Kingdom) K Skupski
6
3
[5]

WC
- (Portugal) P Sousa
- (Portugal) L Tavares
3
3

(India) R Bopanna
(Pakistan) A-u-H Qureshi
2
6
[10]

- (India) R Bopanna
- (Pakistan) A-u-H Qureshi
4
6^{2}

- (Spain) Ó Hernández
- (Russia) I Kunitsyn
2
3

WC
- (Portugal) P Sousa
- (Portugal) L Tavares
6
7^{7}

WC
(Portugal) P Sousa
(Portugal) L Tavares
6
6

1
- (Uruguay) P Cuevas
- (Spain) M Granollers
7^{7}
4
[4]

(Spain) M López
(Spain) D Marrero
6
6

- (Spain) M López
- (Spain) D Marrero
6^{1}
6
[10]

- (Thailand) Sa Ratiwatana
- (Thailand) So Ratiwatana
0
2

- (Spain) M López
- (Spain) D Marrero
6
6

- (Portugal) F Gil
- (Portugal) R Machado
6^{6}
6^{4}

3
- (France) A Clément
- (Sweden) R Lindstedt
4
4

3
- (France) A Clément
- (Sweden) R Lindstedt
7^{8}
7^{7}

- (Spain) M López
- (Spain) D Marrero
6
3
[10]

(Australia) S Huss
(Brazil) A Sá
6
6

- (Australia) S Huss
- (Brazil) A Sá
3
6
[6]

- (Germany) F Mayer
- (Poland) M Przysiężny
2
1

(Australia) S Huss
(Brazil) A Sá
6
6

(Belgium) X Malisse
(Belgium) D Norman
2
7^{8}
[10]

- (Belgium) X Malisse
- (Belgium) D Norman
4
4

2
- (Czech Republic) M Damm
- (Slovakia) F Polášek
6
6^{6}
[7]
