= 2011 Estoril Open =

2011 tennis tournament in Portugal

- Date: 23 April – 1 May, 2011
- Edition: 22nd (ATP) / 15th (WTA)
- Surface: Clay / outdoor
- Location: Oeiras, Portugal
- Venue: Estádio Nacional

Champions

Men's singles
- (Argentina) Juan Martín del Potro

Women's singles
- (Spain) Anabel Medina Garrigues

Men's doubles
- (United States) Eric Butorac / (Curaçao) Jean-Julien Rojer

Women's doubles
- (Russia) Alisa Kleybanova / (Kazakhstan) Galina Voskoboeva
← 2010 ·	Estoril Open	· 2012 →

The 2011 Estoril Open was a tennis tournament played on outdoor clay courts. It was the 22nd edition of the Estoril Open for the men (the 15th for the women), and was part of the ATP World Tour 250 series of the 2011 ATP World Tour, and of the International-level tournaments of the 2011 WTA Tour. Both the men's and the women's events took place at the Estádio Nacional in Oeiras, Portugal, from 23 April through 1 May 2011.

== ATP entrants ==
=== Seeds ===
Country	Player	Rank^{1}	Seed
SWE	Robin Söderling	5	1
ESP	Fernando Verdasco	12	2
FRA	Jo-Wilfried Tsonga	18	3
FRA	Gilles Simon	22	4
CAN	Milos Raonic	28	5
BRA	Thomaz Bellucci	32	6
RSA	Kevin Anderson	35	7
ARG	Juan Martín del Potro	46	8

- Seedings are based on the rankings of April 18, 2011.

=== Other entrants ===
The following players received wildcards into the main draw:

- (Portugal) Gastão Elias
- (Portugal) João Sousa
- (France) Jo-Wilfried Tsonga

The following players received entry from the qualifying draw:

- (Italy) Flavio Cipolla
- (Denmark) Frederik Nielsen
- (France) Édouard Roger-Vasselin
- (Portugal) Pedro Sousa

== WTA entrants ==
=== Seeds ===
Country	Player	Rank^{1}	Seed
RUS	Alisa Kleybanova	25	1
AUS	Jarmila Gajdošová	30	2
CZE	Klára Zakopalová	35	3
LAT	Anastasija Sevastova	38	4
USA	Bethanie Mattek-Sands	41	5
RUS	Elena Vesnina	45	6
CHN	Zheng Jie	51	7
HUN	Gréta Arn	52	8

- Seedings are based on the rankings of April 18, 2011.

=== Other entrants ===
The following players received wildcards into the main draw:

- (Portugal) Maria João Köhler
- (Portugal) Magali de Lattre
- (Portugal) Bárbara Luz

The following players received entry from the qualifying draw:

- (Spain) Beatriz García Vidagany
- (Austria) Tamira Paszek
- (United States) Sloane Stephens
- (Belarus) Anastasiya Yakimova

== Finals ==
=== Men's singles ===
(Argentina) Juan Martín del Potro defeated (Spain) Fernando Verdasco, 6–2, 6–2

- It was del Potro' 2nd title of the year and 9th of his career.

=== Women's singles ===
(Spain) Anabel Medina Garrigues defeated (Germany) Kristina Barrois, 6–1, 6–2.

- It was Medina Garrigues' 1st title of the year and 10th of her career.

=== Men's doubles ===
(United States) Eric Butorac / (Curaçao) Jean-Julien Rojer defeated (Spain) Marc López / (Spain) David Marrero, 6–3, 6–4.

=== Women's doubles ===
(Russia) Alisa Kleybanova / (Kazakhstan) Galina Voskoboeva defeated (Greece) Eleni Daniilidou / (Netherlands) Michaëlla Krajicek, 6–4, 6–2.
