= 2010 Estoril Open – Men's singles =

Men's singles
- 2010 Estoril Open

Final
- Champion: (Spain) Albert Montañés
- Runner-up: (Portugal) Frederico Gil
- Score: 6–2, 6–7^{(5–7)}, 7–5

Events
Singles	men	women
Doubles	men	women
← 2009 ·	Estoril Open	· 2011 →

Albert Montañés defend his 2009 title, after winning against Frederico Gil in the final. The Spaniard became the second player to win back-to-back titles at this tournament, following Thomas Muster in 1995 and 1996.

== Seeds ==
The top four seeds receive a bye into the second round.

1. (Switzerland) Roger Federer (semifinals)
2. (Croatia) Ivan Ljubičić (withdrew due to a left side strain)
3. (France) Gaël Monfils (withdrew due to illness)
4. (Spain) Albert Montañés (champion)
5. (Spain) Guillermo García López (semifinals)
6. (Germany) Florian Mayer (first round)
7. (Argentina) Juan Ignacio Chela (first round)
8. (Uruguay) Pablo Cuevas (quarterfinals)

== Draw ==
=== Key ===
- Q = Qualifier
- WC = Wild card
- LL = Lucky loser
- Alt = Alternate
- SE = Special exempt
- PR = Protected ranking
- ITF = ITF entry
- JE = Junior exempt
- w/o = Walkover
- r = Retired
- d = Defaulted
- SR = Special ranking

=== Finals ===
Semifinals
1	(Switzerland) Roger Federer	2	6^{5}
4	(Spain) Albert Montañés	6	7^{7}
5	(Spain) Guillermo García López	2	7	3
(Portugal) Frederico Gil	6	5	6

Final
4	(Spain) Albert Montañés	6	6^{4}	7
(Portugal) Frederico Gil	2	7^{7}	5

=== Top half ===
First round
Q	(Spain) M López	4	6	1
(Germany) B Phau	6	4	6
(Russia) I Kunitsyn	5	6	4
(France) A Clément	7	4	6
(Colombia) A Falla	6	7^{7}
7	(Argentina) JI Chela	4	6^{4}
(Ecuador) N Lapentti	3	1^{r}
(Spain) D Gimeno Traver	6	3
(Spain) M Granollers	6	6
(Spain) Ó Hernández	2	1
Q	(Spain) P Andújar	6	5	0
8	(Uruguay) P Cuevas	1	7	6

Second round
1	(Switzerland) R Federer	6	6
(Germany) B Phau	3	4
(France) A Clément	6	6
(Colombia) A Falla	4	3
4	(Spain) A Montañés	6	6
(Spain) D Gimeno Traver	1	2
(Spain) M Granollers	6^{8}	6^{2}
8	(Uruguay) P Cuevas	7^{10}	7^{7}

Quarterfinals
1	(Switzerland) R Federer	7^{9}	6
(France) A Clément	6^{7}	2
4	(Spain) A Montañés	6	6
8	(Uruguay) P Cuevas	4	3

Semifinals
1	(Switzerland) R Federer	2	6^{5}
4	(Spain) A Montañés	6	7^{7}

=== Bottom half ===
First round
5	(Spain) G García López	6	7^{9}
(Belgium) X Malisse	2	6^{7}
WC	(Portugal) L Tavares	6	6
(Brazil) R Mello	3	3
Q	(Spain) A Martín	7^{8}	6
Q	(Argentina) F Delbonis	6^{6}	1
6	(Germany) F Mayer	2	7^{7}	3
(Portugal) F Gil	6	6^{5}	6
(Belgium) S Darcis	4	r
(Colombia) S Giraldo	6
(Chile) N Massú	2	4
WC	(Portugal) R Machado	6	6

Second round
5	(Spain) G García López	6	6
WC	(Portugal) L Tavares	2	2
Q	(Spain) A Martín	6	6
LL	(Spain) D Marrero	1	2
(Portugal) F Gil	6	6
(Colombia) S Giraldo	4	4
WC	(Portugal) R Machado	6	6
LL	(Poland) M Przysiężny	4	4

Quarterfinals
5	(Spain) G García López	6	2
Q	(Spain) A Martín	0	0^{r}
(Portugal) F Gil	4	7^{7}	6
WC	(Portugal) R Machado	6	6^{1}	3

Semifinals
5	(Spain) G García López	2	7	3
(Portugal) F Gil	6	5	6
