= 2009 Estoril Open – Women's singles =

Women's singles
- 2009 Estoril Open

Final
- Champion: (Belgium) Yanina Wickmayer
- Runner-up: (Russia) Ekaterina Makarova
- Score: 7–5, 6–2

Details
- Draw: 32
- Seeds: 8

Events
| Singles | men | women |
| Doubles | men | women |
- Estoril Open

Maria Kirilenko was the defending champion, but lost in the quarterfinals to Ekaterina Makarova.

Yanina Wickmayer defeated Makarova in the final, 7–5, 6–2, to win her first WTA Tour singles title.

== Seeds ==
1. (Czech Republic) Iveta Benešová (second round)
2. (Russia) Maria Kirilenko (quarterfinals)
3. (Romania) Sorana Cîrstea (quarterfinals)
4. (Germany) Sabine Lisicki (quarterfinals, retired)
5. (Czech Republic) Petra Kvitová (first round)
6. (Russia) Ekaterina Makarova (final)
7. (Israel) Shahar Pe'er (semifinals, retired due to a foot injury)
8. (Germany) Anna-Lena Grönefeld (semifinals)

== Draw ==
Key

- Q = Qualifier
- WC = Wild card
- LL = Lucky loser
- Alt = Alternate
- ITF = ITF entry
- PR = Protected ranking
- SR = Special ranking
- SE = Special exempt
- JE = Junior exempt
- JR = Junior Accelerator Programme entrant
- CO = College Accelerator Programme entrant
- NG = Next Gen Accelerator Program entrant
- w/o = Walkover
- r = Retired
- d = Defaulted

=== Finals ===
Semifinals
7 | (Israel) Shahar Pe'er | 0^{r}
(Belgium) Yanina Wickmayer | 3
8 | (Germany) Anna-Lena Grönefeld | 3 | 1
6 | (Russia) Ekaterina Makarova | 6 | 6

Final
(Belgium) Yanina Wickmayer | 7 | 6
6 | (Russia) Ekaterina Makarova | 5 | 2

=== Top half ===
First round
1 | (Czech Republic) I Benešová | 6 | 5 | 6
WC | (Portugal) N Silva | 4 | 7 | 4
(Slovakia) J Groth | 1 | 6 | 6
(France) M Johansson | 6 | 1 | 1
(Czech Republic) B Záhlavová-Strýcová | 7 | 6
Q | (Spain) S Soler Espinosa | 5 | 4
LL | (Portugal) M Larcher de Brito | 6 | 0 | 0
7 | (Israel) S Pe'er | 4 | 6 | 6
3 | (Romania) S Cîrstea | 6 | 1 | 6
(Japan) K Date-Krumm | 2 | 6 | 2
WC | (Portugal) F Piedade | 0 | 6^{4}
(Estonia) M Ani | 6 | 7
(Belarus) O Govortsova | 6 | 6
LL | (Russia) E Ivanova | 1 | 2
(Belgium) Y Wickmayer | 6 | 6
5 | (Czech Republic) P Kvitová | 2 | 4

Second round
1 | (Czech Republic) I Benešová | 5 | 4
(Slovakia) J Groth | 7 | 6
(Czech Republic) B Záhlavová-Strýcová | 4 | 1
7 | (Israel) S Pe'er | 6 | 6
3 | (Romania) S Cîrstea | 7 | 6
(Estonia) M Ani | 5 | 2
(Belarus) O Govortsova | 6 | 2 | 2
(Belgium) Y Wickmayer | 0 | 6 | 6

Quarterfinals
(Slovakia) J Groth | 2 | 6 | 3
7 | (Israel) S Pe'er | 6 | 0 | 6
3 | (Romania) S Cîrstea | 4 | 6 | 4
(Belgium) Y Wickmayer | 6 | 1 | 6

Semifinals
7 | (Israel) S Pe'er | 0^{r}
(Belgium) Y Wickmayer | 3

=== Bottom half ===
First round
8 | (Germany) A-L Grönefeld | 1 | 6 | 7
(France) P Parmentier | 6 | 3 | 6^{1}
(Germany) K Barrois | 7 | 6
WC | (Portugal) MJ Koehler | 6^{4} | 0
Q | (Russia) E Bovina | 6 | 6
(Russia) A Kudryavtseva | 1 | 3
(Belgium) K Flipkens | 2 | 2
4 | (Germany) S Lisicki | 6 | 6
6 | (Russia) E Makarova | 6 | 6
(Czech Republic) P Cetkovská | 4 | 3
Q | (Spain) E Fernández Brugués | 5 | 5
(Hungary) M Czink | 7 | 7
(France) J Coin | 4 | 4
(Argentina) ME Salerni | 6 | 6
Q | (Canada) S Fichman | 7 | 4 | 3
2 | (Russia) M Kirilenko | 6^{8} | 6 | 6

Second round
8 | (Germany) A-L Grönefeld | 6 | 6
(Germany) K Barrois | 4 | 4
Q | (Russia) E Bovina | 4 | 5
4 | (Germany) S Lisicki | 6 | 7
6 | (Russia) E Makarova | 5 | 7 | 7
(Hungary) M Czink | 7 | 5 | 5
(Argentina) ME Salerni | 3 | 0
2 | (Russia) M Kirilenko | 6 | 6

Quarterfinals
8 | (Germany) A-L Grönefeld | 6 | 0
4 | (Germany) S Lisicki | 2 | 0^{r}
6 | (Russia) E Makarova | 5 | 6 | 6
2 | (Russia) M Kirilenko | 7 | 2 | 2

Semifinals
8 | (Germany) A-L Grönefeld | 3 | 1
6 | (Russia) E Makarova | 6 | 6
