= 2009 Estoril Open – Men's doubles =

Men's doubles
- 2009 Estoril Open

Final
- Champions: (United States) Eric Butorac; (United States) Scott Lipsky
- Runners-up: (Czech Republic) Martin Damm; (Sweden) Robert Lindstedt
- Score: 6–3, 6–2

Events
Singles	men	women
Doubles	men	women
← 2008 ·	Estoril Open	· 2010 →

Jeff Coetzee and Wesley Moodie were the defending champions, but Coetzee chose not to participate that year.
Moodie partnered with Dick Norman, but lost in the semifinals to Martin Damm and Robert Lindstedt.

== Seeds ==
1. (Brazil) Bruno Soares / (Zimbabwe) Kevin Ullyett (first round)
2. (Uruguay) Pablo Cuevas / (Serbia) Dušan Vemić (quarterfinals)
3. (Czech Republic) František Čermák / (Slovakia) Michal Mertiňák (semifinals)
4. (Czech Republic) Martin Damm / (Sweden) Robert Lindstedt (final)

== Draw ==
=== Key ===
- Q = Qualifier
- WC = Wild card
- LL = Lucky loser
- Alt = Alternate
- SE = Special exempt
- PR = Protected ranking
- ITF = ITF entry
- JE = Junior exempt
- w/o = Walkover
- r = Retired
- d = Defaulted
- SR = Special ranking

=== Draw ===
First round

Quarterfinals

Semifinals

Final

1
- (Brazil) B Soares
- (Zimbabwe) K Ullyett
5
3

(United States) E Butorac
(United States) S Lipsky
7
6

(United States) E Butorac
(United States) S Lipsky
3
7
[10]

WC
- (Portugal) F Gil
- (Portugal) R Machado
3
5

- (United States) M Fish
- (United States) D Martin
6
5
[5]

(United States) M Fish
(United States) D Martin
6
7

(United States) E Butorac
(United States) S Lipsky
6
6

3
(Czech Republic) F Čermák
(Slovakia) M Mertiňák
6
6

3
- (Czech Republic) F Čermák
- (Slovakia) M Mertiňák
3
3

ALT
- (Chile) P Capdeville
- (Spain) I Navarro
3
2

3
(Czech Republic) F Čermák
(Slovakia) M Mertiňák
6
6

(United States) J Blake
(United States) R Kendrick
6
3
[11]

- (United States) J Blake
- (United States) R Kendrick
4
2

- (Russia) T Gabashvili
- (Argentina) D Junqueira
3
6
[9]

- (United States) E Butorac
- (United States) S Lipsky
6
6

(Czech Republic) L Friedl
(Czech Republic) D Škoch
6
6

4
- (Czech Republic) M Damm
- (Sweden) R Lindstedt
3
2

WC
- (Portugal) P Sousa
- (Portugal) J Sousa
0
0

- (Czech Republic) L Friedl
- (Czech Republic) D Škoch
6^{4}
2

- (Spain) Ó Hernández
- (Spain) A Montañés
1
6
[4]

4
- (Czech Republic) M Damm
- (Sweden) R Lindstedt
7^{7}
6

4
(Czech Republic) M Damm
(Sweden) R Lindstedt
6
3
[10]

4
(Czech Republic) M Damm
(Sweden) R Lindstedt
6
4
[10]

- (France) M Gicquel
- (France) F Serra
2
2

- (South Africa) W Moodie
- (Belgium) D Norman
4
6
[7]

- (South Africa) W Moodie
- (Belgium) D Norman
6
6

(South Africa) W Moodie
(Belgium) D Norman
6^{6}
6
[14]

- (Argentina) M González
- (Argentina) J Mónaco
3
4

2
- (Uruguay) P Cuevas
- (Serbia) D Vemić
7^{8}
4
[12]

2
(Uruguay) P Cuevas
(Serbia) D Vemić
6
6
