= 2011 Estoril Open – Men's singles =

Men's singles
- 2011 Estoril Open

Final
- Champion: (Argentina) Juan Martín del Potro
- Runner-up: (Spain) Fernando Verdasco
- Score: 6–2, 6–2

Events
Singles	men	women
Doubles	men	women
← 2010 ·	Estoril Open	· 2012 →

Albert Montañés was the defending champion, but chose to compete in the Serbia Open instead.
Juan Martín del Potro defeated Fernando Verdasco 6–2, 6–2 to claim his 2nd title this year since rehabilitating from wrist surgery, and his first on clay in nearly three years. It was Del Potro's ninth career title.

== Seeds ==
The top four seeds received a bye into the second round.

1. (Sweden) Robin Söderling (quarterfinals)
2. (Spain) Fernando Verdasco (final)
3. (France) Jo-Wilfried Tsonga (second round)
4. (France) Gilles Simon (quarterfinals)
5. (Canada) Milos Raonic (semifinals, retired due to back injury)
6. (Brazil) Thomaz Bellucci (quarterfinals)
7. (South Africa) Kevin Anderson (quarterfinals)
8. (Argentina) Juan Martín del Potro (champion)

== Draw ==
=== Key ===
- Q = Qualifier
- WC = Wild card
- LL = Lucky loser
- Alt = Alternate
- ITF = ITF entry
- PR = Protected ranking
- SR = Special ranking
- SE = Special exempt
- JE = Junior exempt
- JR = Junior Accelerator Programme entrant
- CO = College Accelerator Programme entrant
- NG = Next Gen Accelerator Program entrant
- w/o = Walkover
- r = Retired
- d = Defaulted

=== Finals ===
Semifinals
8	(Argentina) Juan Martín del Potro	6	7^{8}
(Uruguay) Pablo Cuevas	2	6^{6}
5	(Canada) Milos Raonic	4^{r}
2	(Spain) Fernando Verdasco	6

Final
8	(Argentina) Juan Martín del Potro	6	6
2	(Spain) Fernando Verdasco	2	2

=== Top half ===
First round
(France) J Chardy	6	6
(France) A Mannarino	4	3
(Colombia) A Falla	4	6	4
(Spain) P Andújar	6	1	4^{r}
Q	(Portugal) P Sousa	2	6	3
8	(Argentina) JM del Potro	6	3	6
(Spain) P Riba	2	4
(Uruguay) P Cuevas	6	6
(Brazil) M Daniel	3	1
Q	(France) É Roger-Vasselin	6	6
Q	(Denmark) F Nielsen	5	1
6	(Brazil) T Bellucci	7	6

Second round
1	(Sweden) R Söderling	6	6^{4}	6
(France) J Chardy	1	7^{7}	1
(Colombia) A Falla	2	1
8	(Argentina) JM del Potro	6	6
3/WC	(France) J-W Tsonga	2	6^{0}
(Uruguay) P Cuevas	6	7^{7}
Q	(France) É Roger-Vasselin	3	7	5
6	(Brazil) T Bellucci	6	5	7

Quarterfinals
1	(Sweden) R Söderling	4	5
8	(Argentina) JM del Potro	6	7
(Uruguay) P Cuevas	6	6
6	(Brazil) T Bellucci	4	2

Semifinals
8	(Argentina) JM del Potro	6	7^{8}
(Uruguay) P Cuevas	2	6^{6}

=== Bottom half ===
First round
5	(Canada) M Raonic	6	6
(Russia) I Andreev	4	4
WC	(Portugal) J Sousa	7^{8}	3	5
WC	(Portugal) G Elias	6^{6}	6	2^{r}
(Spain) D Gimeno Traver	4	3
(Argentina) C Berlocq	6	6
7	(South Africa) K Anderson	5	6	6
(Netherlands) T de Bakker	7	3	2
(Portugal) R Machado	3	3
(Romania) V Hănescu	6	6
Q	(Italy) F Cipolla	3	2
(Portugal) F Gil	6	6

Second round
5	(Canada) M Raonic	6	6
WC	(Portugal) J Sousa	3	3
(Argentina) C Berlocq	2	1
4	(France) G Simon	6	6
7	(South Africa) K Anderson	6	6
(Romania) V Hănescu	4	2
(Portugal) F Gil	1	6^{5}
2	(Spain) F Verdasco	6	7^{7}

Quarterfinals
5	(Canada) M Raonic	7^{7}	4	6
4	(France) G Simon	6^{4}	6	3
7	(South Africa) K Anderson	7^{7}	2	3
2	(Spain) F Verdasco	6^{2}	6	6

Semifinals
5	(Canada) M Raonic	4^{r}
2	(Spain) F Verdasco	6

== Bibliography ==
- Main draw
