= 2010 Italian Open – Women's singles =

Women's singles
- 2010 Italian Open

Final
- Champion: (Spain) María José Martínez Sánchez
- Runner-up: (Serbia) Jelena Janković
- Score: 7–6^{(7–5)}, 7–5

Details
- Draw: 56 (4WC/8Q/1LL)
- Seeds: 16

Events
Singles	men	women
Doubles	men	women
- Italian Open

María José Martínez Sánchez defeated Jelena Janković in the final, 7–6^{(7–5)}, 7–5 to win the women's singles tennis title at the 2010 Italian Open. Martínez Sánchez was unseeded in the main draw.

Dinara Safina was the defending champion, but lost in the second round to Alexandra Dulgheru.

Top seed and world No. 1 Serena Williams made it to the semifinals, but was edged by Janković after failing to convert a match point. Unseeded and former world No. 1 Ana Ivanovic also made a surprise run into the semifinals by beating two top 10 players and a top 15 player, but failed to defeat Martínez Sánchez.

== Seeds ==
The top eight seeds receive a bye into the second round.

1. (United States) Serena Williams (semifinals)
2. (Denmark) Caroline Wozniacki (third round)
3. (Russia) Dinara Safina (second round)
4. (United States) Venus Williams (quarterfinals)
5. (Russia) Svetlana Kuznetsova (second round)
6. (Russia) Elena Dementieva (third round)
7. (Serbia) Jelena Janković (final)
8. (Poland) Agnieszka Radwańska (third round)
9. (Belarus) Victoria Azarenka (second round)
10. (Australia) ~~Samantha Stosur~~ (withdrew due to fatigue)
11. (Belgium) Yanina Wickmayer (third round)
12. (Italy) Flavia Pennetta (second round)
13. (Italy) Francesca Schiavone (second round)
14. (Russia) Nadia Petrova (quarterfinals)
15. (Russia) Vera Zvonareva (first round)
16. (Israel) Shahar Pe'er (third round)

== Draw ==
Key

- Q = Qualifier
- WC = Wild card
- LL = Lucky loser
- Alt = Alternate
- ITF = ITF entry
- PR = Protected ranking
- SR = Special ranking
- SE = Special exempt
- JE = Junior exempt
- JR = Junior Accelerator Programme entrant
- CO = College Accelerator Programme entrant
- NG = Next Gen Accelerator Program entrant
- w/o = Walkover
- r = Retired
- d = Defaulted

=== Finals ===
Quarterfinals
1/WC	(United States) Serena Williams	6	6
(Russia) Maria Kirilenko	1	4
4	(United States) Venus Williams	0	1
7	(Serbia) Jelena Janković	6	6
(Serbia) Ana Ivanovic	6	7
14	(Russia) Nadia Petrova	2	5
(Czech Republic) Lucie Šafářová	6^{6}	4
(Spain) María José Martínez Sánchez	7^{8}	6

Semifinals
1/WC	(United States) Serena Williams	6	3	6^{5}
7	(Serbia) Jelena Janković	4	6	7^{7}
(Serbia) Ana Ivanovic	4	2
(Spain) María José Martínez Sánchez	6	6

Final
7	(Serbia) Jelena Janković	6^{5}	5
(Spain) María José Martínez Sánchez	7^{7}	7

=== Top half ===
==== Section 1 ====
First round
(Czech Republic) S Záhlavová	0	4
(Switzerland) T Bacsinszky	6	6
(Germany) A Petkovic	6	6
(Russia) V Dushevina	3	0
(Czech Republic) P Kvitová	6	6
15	(Russia) V Zvonareva	4	0
LL	(France) P Parmentier	1	6	5
(Slovakia) D Cibulková	6	3	7
(Italy) A Brianti	6	7^{7}
(Russia) A Pavlyuchenkova	4	6^{5}
(Russia) M Kirilenko	6	6
WC	(Italy) R Oprandi	1	3

Second round
1/WC	(United States) S Williams	7^{7}	6
(Switzerland) T Bacsinszky	6^{2}	1
(Germany) A Petkovic	6	6
(Czech Republic) P Kvitová	3	4
(Slovakia) D Cibulková	6	6
(Italy) A Brianti	3	4
(Russia) M Kirilenko	6	3	6
5	(Russia) S Kuznetsova	2	6	4

Third round
1/WC	(United States) S Williams	6	3	6
(Germany) A Petkovic	2	6	0
(Slovakia) D Cibulková	6	1	1
(Russia) M Kirilenko	4	6	6

Quarterfinals
1/WC	(United States) S Williams	6	6
(Russia) M Kirilenko	1	4

==== Section 2 ====
First round
(Argentina) G Dulko	7^{7}	2	6^{5}
(Switzerland) P Schnyder	6^{5}	6	7^{7}
(Slovenia) P Hercog	6	6
Q	(Hungary) G Arn	3	3
WC	(Italy) C Dentoni	2	1
16	(Israel) S Pe'er	6	6
11	(Belgium) Y Wickmayer	6	1	6
Q	(Croatia) K Šprem	3	6	4
Q	(Japan) A Morita	4	2
(France) A Rezaï	6	6
Q	(United States) B Mattek-Sands	6	6
(United States) M Oudin	1	3

Second round
4	(United States) V Williams	6	6
(Switzerland) P Schnyder	2	2
(Slovenia) P Hercog	6	5	3
16	(Israel) S Pe'er	2	7	6
11	(Belgium) Y Wickmayer	6	6^{2}	7
(France) A Rezaï	3	7^{7}	5
Q	(United States) B Mattek-Sands	3	6	1
7	(Serbia) J Janković	6	3	6

Third round
4	(United States) V Williams	6	6
16	(Israel) S Pe'er	3	4
11	(Belgium) Y Wickmayer	2	0
7	(Serbia) J Janković	6	6

Quarterfinals
4	(United States) V Williams	0	1
7	(Serbia) J Janković	6	6

=== Bottom half ===
==== Section 3 ====
First round
(Kazakhstan) Y Shvedova	6	6
Q	(Serbia) B Jovanovski	2	2
(Serbia) A Ivanovic	6	6
(Russia) E Vesnina	1	3
Q	(Kazakhstan) S Karatantcheva	1	4
9	(Belarus) V Azarenka	6	6
14	(Russia) N Petrova	6	6
(Italy) T Garbin	3	2
Q	(United States) V Lepchenko	7^{7}	5	3
PR	(Slovenia) K Srebotnik	6^{2}	7	6
(Italy) S Errani	6	1	4
(Romania) A Dulgheru	2	6	6

Second round
6	(Russia) E Dementieva	6	7
(Kazakhstan) Y Shvedova	4	5
(Serbia) A Ivanovic	6	6
9	(Belarus) V Azarenka	4	4
14	(Russia) N Petrova	6	6
PR	(Slovenia) K Srebotnik	4	4
(Romania) A Dulgheru	6	6^{5}	6
3	(Russia) D Safina	4	7^{7}	1

Third round
6	(Russia) E Dementieva	1	6^{5}
(Serbia) A Ivanovic	6	7^{7}
14	(Russia) N Petrova	6	3	6
(Romania) A Dulgheru	0	6	2

Quarterfinals
(Serbia) A Ivanovic	6	7
14	(Russia) N Petrova	2	5

==== Section 4 ====
First round
(Italy) R Vinci	7^{8}	7^{7}
(Russia) A Kleybanova	6^{6}	6^{5}
(Czech Republic) L Šafářová	6	6^{9}	6
(Belarus) O Govortsova	2	7^{11}	3
Q	(Uzbekistan) A Amanmuradova	2	3
12	(Italy) F Pennetta	6	6
13	(Italy) F Schiavone	3	6	6
(Slovakia) D Hantuchová	6	2	2
(Russia) A Kudryavtseva	7	4	3
(Spain) MJ Martínez Sánchez	5	6	6
WC	(Italy) ME Camerin	6	4	6
(China) J Zheng	4	6	4

Second round
8	(Poland) A Radwańska	6	6
(Italy) R Vinci	1	0
(Czech Republic) L Šafářová	6	6
12	(Italy) F Pennetta	1	2
13	(Italy) F Schiavone	2	2
(Spain) MJ Martínez Sánchez	6	6
WC	(Italy) ME Camerin	1	0
2	(Denmark) C Wozniacki	6	6

Third round
8	(Poland) A Radwańska	6	3	6^{1}
(Czech Republic) L Šafářová	1	6	7^{7}
(Spain) MJ Martínez Sánchez	6	6
2	(Denmark) C Wozniacki	4	2

Quarterfinals
(Czech Republic) L Šafářová	6^{6}	4
(Spain) MJ Martínez Sánchez	7^{8}	6

== Qualifying ==
=== Qualifying seeds ===
1. (United Kingdom) Elena Baltacha (first round)
2. (Japan) Ayumi Morita (qualified)
3. (France) Pauline Parmentier (qualifying competition, lucky loser)
4. (Australia) Alicia Molik (qualifying competition)
5. (Bulgaria) Tsvetana Pironkova (first round)
6. (Uzbekistan) Akgul Amanmuradova (qualified)
7. (Croatia) Karolina Šprem (qualified)
8. (United States) Varvara Lepchenko (qualified)
9. (United Kingdom) Anne Keothavong (qualifying competition)
10. (Russia) Ekaterina Bychkova (qualifying competition)
11. (Serbia) Bojana Jovanovski (qualified)
12. (United States) Bethanie Mattek-Sands (qualified)
13. (South Africa) Chanelle Scheepers (qualifying competition)
14. (Kazakhstan) Sesil Karatantcheva (qualified)
15. (Italy) Anna Floris (qualifying competition)
16. (Ukraine) Olga Savchuk (qualifying competition)

=== Qualifiers ===
1. (Hungary) Gréta Arn
2. (Japan) Ayumi Morita
3. (United States) Bethanie Mattek-Sands
4. (Serbia) Bojana Jovanovski
5. (Kazakhstan) Sesil Karatantcheva
6. (Uzbekistan) Akgul Amanmuradova
7. (Croatia) Karolina Šprem
8. (United States) Varvara Lepchenko

=== Lucky loser ===
1. (France) Pauline Parmentier

=== Qualifying draw ===
==== First qualifier ====
First round
1	(United Kingdom) Elena Baltacha	6	3	6^{5}
(Hungary) Gréta Arn	2	6	7^{7}
(Hungary) Katalin Marosi	1	3
10	(Russia) Ekaterina Bychkova	6	6

Qualifying competition
(Hungary) Gréta Arn	6	6
10	(Russia) Ekaterina Bychkova	2	4

==== Second qualifier ====
First round
2	(Japan) Ayumi Morita	7^{7}	6
WC	(Italy) Martina Di Giuseppe	6^{2}	1
(Italy) Nathalie Viérin	6^{5}	5
15	(Italy) Anna Floris	7^{7}	7

Qualifying competition
2	(Japan) Ayumi Morita	6	6
15	(Italy) Anna Floris	1	1

==== Third qualifier ====
First round
3	(France) Pauline Parmentier	6	6
(Russia) Yuliya Kalabina	2	1
(Belarus) Ekaterina Dzehalevich	4	0
12	(United States) Bethanie Mattek-Sands	6	6

Qualifying competition
3	(France) Pauline Parmentier	4	4
12	(United States) Bethanie Mattek-Sands	6	6

==== Fourth qualifier ====
First round
4	(Australia) Alicia Molik	6	6
(Hungary) Anikó Kapros	4	2
(Spain) Nuria Llagostera Vives	3	6	4
11	(Serbia) Bojana Jovanovski	6	1	6

Qualifying competition
4	(Australia) Alicia Molik	2	3
11	(Serbia) Bojana Jovanovski	6	6

==== Fifth qualifier ====
First round
5	(Bulgaria) Tsvetana Pironkova	6	5	2
(Belarus) Tatiana Poutchek	0	7	6
(Italy) Claudia Giovine	1	4
14	(Kazakhstan) Sesil Karatantcheva	6	6

Qualifying competition
(Belarus) Tatiana Poutchek	2	1
14	(Kazakhstan) Sesil Karatantcheva	6	6

==== Sixth qualifier ====
First round
6	(Uzbekistan) Akgul Amanmuradova	6	6
(Italy) Giulia Gatto-Monticone	2	1
WC	(Italy) Nastassja Burnett	0	5
13	(South Africa) Chanelle Scheepers	6	7

Qualifying competition
6	(Uzbekistan) Akgul Amanmuradova	6	7^{7}
13	(South Africa) Chanelle Scheepers	0	6^{1}

==== Seventh qualifier ====
First round
7	(Croatia) Karolina Šprem	6	6
(Italy) Federica Di Sarra	2	4
WC	(Italy) Alice Moroni	3	1
9	(United Kingdom) Anne Keothavong	6	6

Qualifying competition
7	(Croatia) Karolina Šprem	6	6
9	(United Kingdom) Anne Keothavong	0	3

==== Eighth qualifier ====
First round
8	(United States) Varvara Lepchenko	6	6
WC	(Italy) Anastasia Grymalska	1	3
(Russia) Marta Sirotkina	0	1
16	(Ukraine) Olga Savchuk	6	6

Qualifying competition
8	(United States) Varvara Lepchenko	6	2	6
16	(Ukraine) Olga Savchuk	2	6	3
