= 2009 Estoril Open =

- Date: 2–10 May
- Edition: 20th (ATP) / 13th (WTA)
- Surface: Clay / outdoor
- Location: Oeiras, Portugal
- Venue: Estádio Nacional

Champions

Men's singles
- (Spain) Albert Montañés

Women's singles
- (Belgium) Yanina Wickmayer

Men's doubles
- (United States) Eric Butorac / (United States) Scott Lipsky

Women's doubles
- (United States) Raquel Kops-Jones / (United States) Abigail Spears
- Estoril Open

The 2009 Estoril Open was a tennis tournament played on outdoor clay courts. It was the 20th edition of the Estoril Open for the men (the 13th for the women), and was part of the ATP World Tour 250 series of the 2009 ATP World Tour, and of the International-level tournaments of the 2009 WTA Tour. Both the men's and the women's events took place at the Estádio Nacional in Oeiras, Portugal, from 2 May through 10 May 2009.

The men's draw was headlined by Gilles Simon, former 2002 and 2006 champion David Nalbandian and 2003 champion Nikolay Davydenko. Other players included David Ferrer, Mardy Fish and 2001 champion Juan Carlos Ferrero.

The women's draw was headlined by 2004 and 2008 finalist Iveta Benešová and 2008 champion Maria Kirilenko. Other players included Shahar Pe'er and Anna-Lena Grönefeld.

== Finals ==
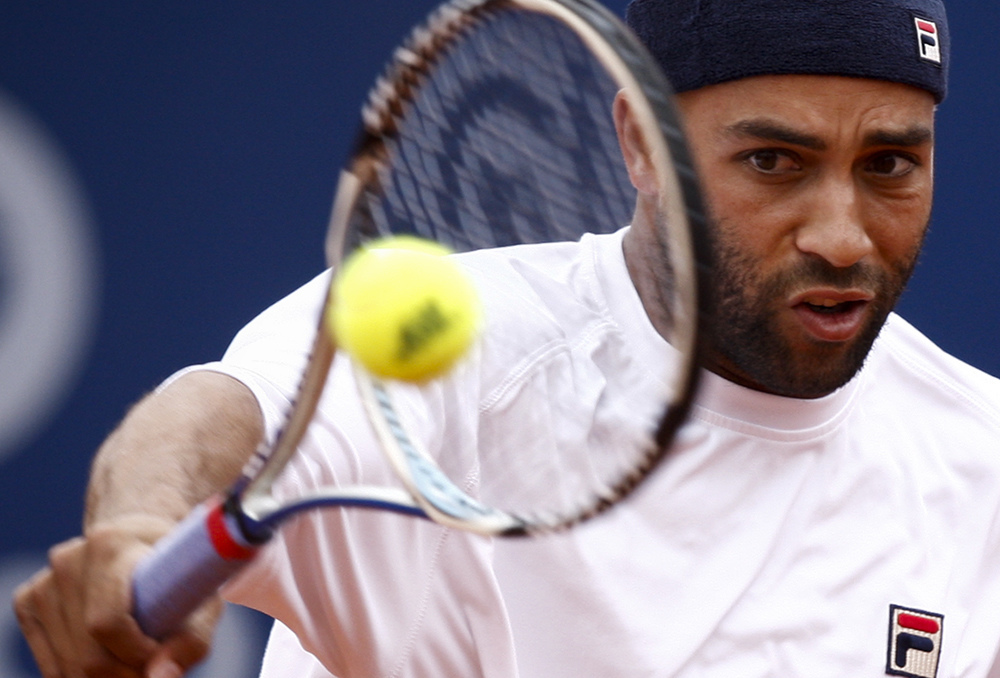
James Blake was runner-up

=== Men's singles ===
(Spain) Albert Montañés defeated (United States) James Blake, 5–7, 7–6^{(8–6)}, 6–0

- It was Montañés' first title of the year and second of his career.

=== Women's singles ===
(Belgium) Yanina Wickmayer defeated (Russia) Ekaterina Makarova, 7–5, 6–2

- It was Wickmayer's first career title.

=== Men's doubles ===
(United States) Eric Butorac / (United States) Scott Lipsky defeated (Czech Republic) Martin Damm / (Sweden) Robert Lindstedt, 6–3, 6–2

=== Women's doubles ===
(United States) Raquel Kops-Jones / (United States) Abigail Spears defeated (Canada) Sharon Fichman / (Hungary) Katalin Marosi, 2–6, 6–3, [10–5]

== ATP entrants ==
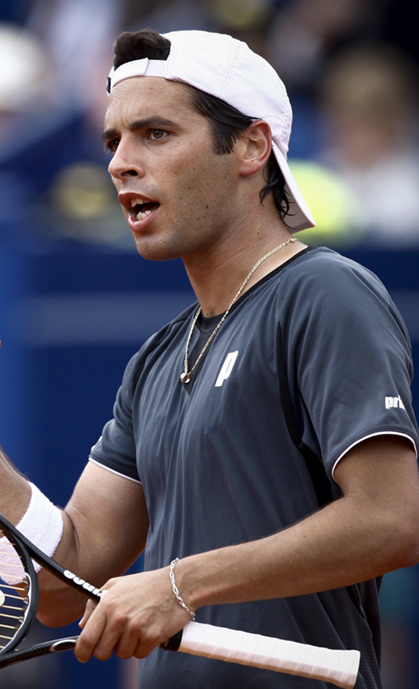
Albert Montañés won his second career title

=== Seeds ===
Player	Nationality	Ranking*	Seeding
Gilles Simon	France	7	1
Nikolay Davydenko	Russia	11	2
David Ferrer	Spain	14	3
James Blake	United States	16	4
David Nalbandian	Argentina	18	5
Mardy Fish	United States	28	6
Albert Montañés	Spain	33	7
Florent Serra	France	48	8

- Seedings are based on the rankings of April 27, 2009.

=== Other entrants ===
The following players received wildcards into the main draw:

- (France) Gilles Simon
- (Argentina) Gastón Gaudio
- (Portugal) Rui Machado

The following players received entry from the qualifying draw:

- (Uruguay) Pablo Cuevas
- (Kazakhstan) Mikhail Kukushkin
- (Brazil) Ricardo Hocevar
- (United States) Ryan Sweeting

== WTA entrants ==
=== Seeds ===
Player	Nationality	Ranking*	Seeding
Iveta Benešová	Czech Republic	29	1
Maria Kirilenko	Russia	38	2
Sorana Cîrstea	Romania	40	3
Sabine Lisicki	Germany	42	4
Petra Kvitová	Czech Republic	48	5
Ekaterina Makarova	Russia	51	6
Shahar Pe'er	Israel	53	7
Anna-Lena Grönefeld	Germany	57	8

- Seedings are based on the rankings of April 27, 2009.

=== Other entrants ===
The following players received wildcards into the main draw:

- (Portugal) Neuza Silva
- (Portugal) Frederica Piedade
- (Portugal) Maria João Koehler

The following players received entry from the qualifying draw:

- (Spain) Eva Fernández Brugués
- (Canada) Sharon Fichman
- (Spain) Sílvia Soler Espinosa
- (Russia) Elena Bovina
