= 2010 Italian Open – Men's singles =

Men's singles
- 2010 Italian Open

Final
- Champion: (Spain) Rafael Nadal
- Runner-up: (Spain) David Ferrer
- Score: 7–5, 6–2

Events
Singles	men	women
Doubles	men	women
- Italian Open

Defending champion Rafael Nadal defeated David Ferrer in the final, 7–5, 6–2 to win the men's singles tennis title at the 2010 Italian Open. It was his record-extending fifth Italian Open title, and marked the second leg of Nadal's “Clay Slam”—a season sweep of the Monte-Carlo, Rome, Madrid, and French Open clay court tournaments.

== Seeds ==
The top eight seeds receive a bye into the second round.

1. (Switzerland) Roger Federer (second round)
2. (Serbia) Novak Djokovic (quarterfinals)
3. (Spain) Rafael Nadal (champion)
4. (United Kingdom) Andy Murray (third round)
5. (Sweden) Robin Söderling (third round)
6. (Spain) Fernando Verdasco (semifinals)
7. (France) Jo-Wilfried Tsonga (quarterfinals)
8. (Croatia) Marin Čilić (second round)
9. (Russia) Mikhail Youzhny (first round)
10. (Czech Republic) Tomáš Berdych (second round)
11. (Croatia) Ivan Ljubičić (third round, retired due to side strain)
12. (Spain) Juan Carlos Ferrero (first round)
13. (Spain) David Ferrer (final)
14. (United States) John Isner (second round)
15. (United States) Sam Querrey (first round)
16. (Argentina) Juan Mónaco (second round)

== Draw ==
Key

- Q = Qualifier
- WC = Wild card
- LL = Lucky loser
- Alt = Alternate
- ITF = ITF entry
- PR = Protected ranking
- SR = Special ranking
- SE = Special exempt
- JE = Junior exempt
- JR = Junior Accelerator Programme entrant
- CO = College Accelerator Programme entrant
- NG = Next Gen Accelerator Program entrant
- w/o = Walkover
- r = Retired
- d = Defaulted

=== Finals ===
Quarterfinals
(Latvia) Ernests Gulbis	7	6
(Spain) Feliciano López	6^{6}	1
3	(Spain) Rafael Nadal	6	6
(Switzerland) Stan Wawrinka	4	1
7	(France) Jo-Wilfried Tsonga	4	1
13	(Spain) David Ferrer	6	6
6	(Spain) Fernando Verdasco	7	3	6
2	(Serbia) Novak Djokovic	6^{4}	6	4

Semifinals
(Latvia) Ernests Gulbis	4	6	4
3	(Spain) Rafael Nadal	6	3	6
13	(Spain) David Ferrer	7	6
6	(Spain) Fernando Verdasco	5	3

Final
3	(Spain) Rafael Nadal	7	6
13	(Spain) David Ferrer	5	2

=== Top half ===
==== Section 1 ====
First round
(Cyprus) M Baghdatis	2	2
(Latvia) E Gulbis	6	6
WC	(Italy) F Volandri	6	6
Q	(Australia) P Luczak	4	3
(France) J Benneteau	7	3	7
15	(United States) S Querrey	6^{6}	6	6^{2}
11	(Croatia) I Ljubičić	7	6^{1}	6
(France) P-H Mathieu	5	7	0
(Spain) N Almagro	6^{3}	6	6
(Poland) Ł Kubot	7	2	3
(Germany) B Becker	4	3
(Spain) F López	6	6

Second round
1	(Switzerland) R Federer	6	1	5
(Latvia) E Gulbis	2	6	7
WC	(Italy) F Volandri	6	6
(France) J Benneteau	2	0
11	(Croatia) I Ljubičić	7	7
(Spain) N Almagro	5	6^{3}
(Spain) F López	2	7	6
8	(Croatia) M Čilić	6	6^{2}	4

Third round
(Latvia) E Gulbis	6	3	7
WC	(Italy) F Volandri	2	6	6^{4}
11	(Croatia) I Ljubičić	0	r
(Spain) F López	0

Quarterfinals
(Latvia) E Gulbis	7	6
(Spain) F López	6^{6}	1

==== Section 2 ====
First round
(Uruguay) P Cuevas	7	1	4
(Germany) P Kohlschreiber	6^{1}	6	6
(Romania) V Hănescu	6	6^{5}	6
(Germany) M Berrer	2	7	3
(Russia) I Andreev	6^{4}	5
16	(Argentina) J Mónaco	7	7
10	(Czech Republic) T Berdych	6	6
Q	(Spain) M Granollers	3	3
(Austria) J Melzer	1	2
(Switzerland) S Wawrinka	6	6
WC	(Italy) P Lorenzi	2	6	6
(Spain) A Montañés	6	4	3

Second round
3	(Spain) R Nadal	6	6
(Germany) P Kohlschreiber	1	3
(Romania) V Hănescu	7	6
16	(Argentina) J Mónaco	6^{4}	4
10	(Czech Republic) T Berdych	6	3	6^{6}
(Switzerland) S Wawrinka	2	6	7
WC	(Italy) P Lorenzi	1	5
5	(Sweden) R Söderling	6	7

Third round
3	(Spain) R Nadal	6	6
(Romania) V Hănescu	3	2
(Switzerland) S Wawrinka	6	6
5	(Sweden) R Söderling	3	2

Quarterfinals
3	(Spain) R Nadal	6	6
(Switzerland) S Wawrinka	4	1

=== Bottom half ===
==== Section 3 ====
First round
(Serbia) V Troicki	3	6	1
SE	(Netherlands) T de Bakker	6	1	0^{r}
Q	(France) M Llodra	6	3	6
(Germany) A Beck	2	6	4
Q	(Colombia) S Giraldo	6	6
12	(Spain) JC Ferrero	0	3
13	(Spain) D Ferrer	6	6
(Kazakhstan) E Korolev	4	1
Q	(Czech Republic) J Hájek	2	2
WC	(Italy) P Starace	6	6
(Italy) A Seppi	6	6
(Italy) F Fognini	0	3

Second round
7	(France) J-W Tsonga	6	6
(Serbia) V Troicki	2	3
Q	(France) M Llodra	3	2
Q	(Colombia) S Giraldo	6	6
13	(Spain) D Ferrer	7	6
WC	(Italy) P Starace	5	2
(Italy) A Seppi	2	4
4	(United Kingdom) A Murray	6	6

Third round
7	(France) J-W Tsonga	6	6
Q	(Colombia) S Giraldo	3	4
13	(Spain) D Ferrer	6	6
4	(United Kingdom) A Murray	3	4

Quarterfinals
7	(France) J-W Tsonga	4	1
13	(Spain) D Ferrer	6	6

==== Section 4 ====
First round
WC	(Italy) S Bolelli	6	6
LL	(Germany) S Greul	4	1
(Spain) G García López	6	6
Q	(Argentina) JI Chela	2	2
(Australia) L Hewitt	6	4	6
9	(Russia) M Youzhny	4	6	3
14	(United States) J Isner	4	7	7
(Argentina) H Zeballos	6	6^{5}	5
(Brazil) T Bellucci	6	3	6
Q	(Argentina) L Mayer	4	6	1
(Serbia) J Tipsarević	4	4
(France) J Chardy	6	6

Second round
6	(Spain) F Verdasco	7	6
WC	(Italy) S Bolelli	6^{11}	3
(Spain) G García López	6	6
(Australia) L Hewitt	2	3
14	(United States) J Isner	6^{7}	5
(Brazil) T Bellucci	7	7
(France) J Chardy	1	1
2	(Serbia) N Djokovic	6	6

Third round
6	(Spain) F Verdasco	6	7
(Spain) G García López	4	6^{2}
(Brazil) T Bellucci	4	4
2	(Serbia) N Djokovic	6	6

Quarterfinals
6	(Spain) F Verdasco	7	3	6
2	(Serbia) N Djokovic	6^{4}	6	4

== Qualifying ==
=== Seeds ===
1. (Argentina) Juan Ignacio Chela (qualified)
2. (France) Michaël Llodra (qualified)
3. (Colombia) Alejandro Falla (first round)
4. (Germany) Simon Greul (qualifying competition, lucky loser)
5. (Argentina) Leonardo Mayer (qualified)
6. (Finland) Jarkko Nieminen (qualifying competition)
7. (Ukraine) Alexandr Dolgopolov (qualifying competition)
8. (Ukraine) Sergiy Stakhovsky (first round)
9. (United States) Michael Russell (first round)
10. (Australia) Peter Luczak (qualified)
11. (Kazakhstan) Andrey Golubev (qualifying competition)
12. (Colombia) Santiago Giraldo (qualified)
13. (Uzbekistan) Denis Istomin (first round)
14. (Czech Republic) Jan Hájek (qualified)

=== Qualifiers ===
1. (Argentina) Juan Ignacio Chela
2. (France) Michaël Llodra
3. (Spain) Marcel Granollers
4. (Australia) Peter Luczak
5. (Argentina) Leonardo Mayer
6. (Colombia) Santiago Giraldo
7. (Czech Republic) Jan Hájek

=== Lucky losers ===
1. (Germany) Simon Greul

=== Qualifying draw ===
==== First qualifier ====
First round
1	(Argentina) Juan Ignacio Chela	6	6
WC	(Italy) Federico Gaio	0	4
(Spain) Óscar Hernández	4	6	6
8	(Ukraine) Sergiy Stakhovsky	6	4	2

Qualifying competition
1	(Argentina) Juan Ignacio Chela	6	6
(Spain) Óscar Hernández	3	1

==== Second qualifier ====
First round
2	(France) Michaël Llodra	6	7^{7}
(Italy) Flavio Cipolla	3	6^{4}
(Spain) Pere Riba	6	7^{7}
13	(Uzbekistan) Denis Istomin	4	6^{4}

Qualifying competition
2	(France) Michaël Llodra	7^{7}	7^{8}
(Spain) Pere Riba	6^{5}	6^{6}

==== Third qualifier ====
First round
3	(Colombia) Alejandro Falla	5	1
(Spain) Daniel Gimeno Traver	7	6
(Spain) Marcel Granollers	6	6
9	(United States) Michael Russell	4	3

Qualifying competition
(Spain) Daniel Gimeno Traver	2	4
(Spain) Marcel Granollers	6	6

==== Fourth qualifier ====
First round
4	(Germany) Simon Greul	7^{9}	6
(Germany) Mischa Zverev	6^{7}	1
WC	(Italy) Alessandro Giannessi	1	3
10	(Australia) Peter Luczak	6	6

Qualifying competition
4	(Germany) Simon Greul	2	2
10	(Australia) Peter Luczak	6	6

==== Fifth qualifier ====
First round
5	(Argentina) Leonardo Mayer	6	6
Alt	(Italy) Francesco Aldi	4	3
WC	(Italy) Thomas Fabbiano	4	3
11	(Kazakhstan) Andrey Golubev	6	6

Qualifying competition
5	(Argentina) Leonardo Mayer	6^{5}	6	6
11	(Kazakhstan) Andrey Golubev	7^{7}	1	4

==== Sixth qualifier ====
First round
6	(Finland) Jarkko Nieminen	7^{7}	7^{7}
(Spain) Alberto Martín	6^{4}	6^{3}
(Ecuador) Nicolás Lapentti	7^{7}	4	2
12	(Colombia) Santiago Giraldo	6^{3}	6	6

Qualifying competition
6	(Finland) Jarkko Nieminen	6	1	6^{3}
12	(Colombia) Santiago Giraldo	3	6	7^{7}

==== Seventh qualifier ====
First round
7	(Ukraine) Alexandr Dolgopolov	6	6
WC	(Italy) Gianluca Naso	1	3
(Kazakhstan) Yuri Schukin	3	2
14	(Czech Republic) Jan Hájek	6	6

Qualifying competition
7	(Ukraine) Alexandr Dolgopolov	6	2	3
14	(Czech Republic) Jan Hájek	3	6	6
