= 2010 Italian Open – Women's doubles =

Women's doubles
- 2010 Italian Open

Final
- Champions: (Argentina) Gisela Dulko (Italy) Flavia Pennetta
- Runners-up: (Spain) Nuria Llagostera Vives (Spain) María José Martínez Sánchez
- Score: 6–4, 6–2

Details
- Draw: 28
- Seeds: 8

Events
Singles	men	women
Doubles	men	women
← 2009 ·	Italian Open	· 2011 →

Hsieh Su-wei and Peng Shuai were the defending champions, but Hsieh chose not to compete this year and Peng chose to compete in Estoril instead.
6th-seeded Gisela Dulko and Flavia Pennetta won in the final 6–4, 6–2, against 2nd-seeded Nuria Llagostera Vives and María José Martínez Sánchez.

== Seeds ==
The top four seeds received a bye into the second round.

1. (United States) Liezel Huber / (Russia) Nadia Petrova (semifinals)
2. (Spain) Nuria Llagostera Vives / (Spain) María José Martínez Sánchez (finals)
3. (Zimbabwe) Cara Black / (Russia) Elena Vesnina (second round, retired)
4. (United States) Lisa Raymond / (Australia) Rennae Stubbs (semifinals)
5. (United States) Bethanie Mattek-Sands / (China) Yan Zi (quarterfinals)
6. (Argentina) Gisela Dulko / (Italy) Flavia Pennetta (champions)
7. (Czech Republic) Květa Peschke / (Slovenia) Katarina Srebotnik (second round)
8. (Chinese Taipei) Chuang Chia-jung / (Belarus) Olga Govortsova (second round)

== Draw ==
=== Key ===
- Q = Qualifier
- WC = Wild card
- LL = Lucky loser
- Alt = Alternate
- ITF = ITF entry
- PR = Protected ranking
- SR = Special ranking
- SE = Special exempt
- JE = Junior exempt
- JR = Junior Accelerator Programme entrant
- CO = College Accelerator Programme entrant
- NG = Next Gen Accelerator Program entrant
- w/o = Walkover
- r = Retired
- d = Defaulted

=== Finals ===
Semifinals
1	(United States) Liezel Huber (Russia) Nadia Petrova	2	6	[5]
6	(Argentina) Gisela Dulko (Italy) Flavia Pennetta	6	4	[10]
4	(United States) Lisa Raymond (Australia) Rennae Stubbs	2	6^{3}
2	(Spain) Nuria Llagostera Vives (Spain) María José Martínez Sánchez	6	7

Final
6	(Argentina) Gisela Dulko (Italy) Flavia Pennetta	6	6
2	(Spain) Nuria Llagostera Vives (Spain) María José Martínez Sánchez	4	2

=== Top half ===
First round
(Slovenia) P Hercog (Israel) S Pe'er	6	7
(Uzbekistan) A Amanmuradova (Belarus) D Kustova	2	6^{5}
(Russia) M Kondratieva (Czech Republic) V Uhlířová	3	3
(Czech Republic) A Hlaváčková (Ukraine) O Savchuk	6	6
(Latvia) L Dekmeijere (Switzerland) P Schnyder	2	3
5	(United States) B Mattek-Sands (China) Z Yan	6	6
(Belarus) V Azarenka (Russia) V Zvonareva	2	5
(Russia) M Kirilenko (Russia) A Pavlyuchenkova	6	7
(United Kingdom) A Keothavong (Germany) A Petkovic	6	3	[10]
(Belarus) E Dzehalevich (Canada) M-È Pelletier	1	6	[5]
(Switzerland) T Bacsisznky (Italy) T Garbin	3	7	[8]
6	(Argentina) G Dulko (Italy) F Pennetta	6	6^{4}	[10]

Second round
1	(United States) L Huber (Russia) N Petrova	3	6	[10]
(Slovenia) P Hercog (Israel) S Pe'er	6	2	[4]
(Czech Republic) A Hlaváčková (Ukraine) O Savchuk	5	0
5	(United States) B Mattek-Sands (China) Z Yan	7	6
3	(Zimbabwe) C Black (Russia) E Vesnina	2	r
(Russia) M Kirilenko (Russia) A Pavlyuchenkova	6
(United Kingdom) A Keothavong (Germany) A Petkovic	2	2
6	(Argentina) G Dulko (Italy) F Pennetta	6	6

Quarterfinals
1	(United States) L Huber (Russia) N Petrova	7	6
5	(United States) B Mattek-Sands (China) Z Yan	5	2
(Russia) M Kirilenko (Russia) A Pavlyuchenkova	3	2
6	(Argentina) G Dulko (Italy) F Pennetta	6	6

Semifinals
1	(United States) L Huber (Russia) N Petrova	2	6	[5]
6	(Argentina) G Dulko (Italy) F Pennetta	6	4	[10]

=== Bottom half ===
First round
8	(Chinese Taipei) C-j Chuang (Belarus) O Govortsova	6	7
WC	(Italy) A Brianti (Italy) ME Camerin	2	6^{4}
(Poland) A Rosolska (Kazakhstan) Y Shvedova	7	6
(United Kingdom) S Borwell (United States) R Kops-Jones	5	2
(Russia) A Kudryavtseva (United States) R Zalameda	2	1
(Italy) S Errani (Italy) R Vinci	6	6
7	(Czech Republic) K Peschke (Slovenia) K Srebotnik	6	6
(Romania) A Dulgheru (Hungary) K Marosi	2	2
(Russia) V Dushevina (Poland) K Jans	6	5	[10]
WC	(Italy) C Dentoni (Italy) R Oprandi	4	7	[3]
(Australia) A Molik (South Africa) C Scheepers	5	6	8
(Belarus) T Poutchek (Turkey) İ Şenoğlu	[7]	4	[10]

Second round
8	(Chinese Taipei) C-j Chuang (Belarus) O Govortsova	6^{4}	5
(Poland) A Rosolska (Kazakhstan) Y Shvedova	7	7
(Italy) S Errani (Italy) R Vinci	5	6^{5}
4	(United States) L Raymond (Australia) R Stubbs	7	7
7	(Czech Republic) K Peschke (Slovenia) K Srebotnik	4	2
(Russia) V Dushevina (Poland) K Jans	6	6
(Belarus) T Poutchek (Turkey) İ Şenoğlu	2	0
2	(Spain) N Llagostera Vives (Spain) MJ Martínez Sánchez	6	6

Quarterfinals
(Poland) A Rosolska (Kazakhstan) Y Shvedova	6	1	[5]
4	(United States) L Raymond (Australia) R Stubbs	2	6	[10]
(Russia) V Dushevina (Poland) K Jans	2	2
2	(Spain) N Llagostera Vives (Spain) MJ Martínez Sánchez	6	6

Semifinals
4	(United States) L Raymond (Australia) R Stubbs	2	6^{3}
2	(Spain) N Llagostera Vives (Spain) MJ Martínez Sánchez	6	7
