= 2009 Estoril Open – Women's doubles =

Tennis competition

Women's doubles
- 2009 Estoril Open

Final
- Champions: (United States) Raquel Kops-Jones; (United States) Abigail Spears
- Runners-up: (Canada) Sharon Fichman; (Hungary) Katalin Marosi
- Score: 2–6, 6–3, 10–5

Details
- Draw: 16
- Seeds: 4

Events
Singles	men	women
Doubles	men	women
- Estoril Open

Maria Kirilenko and Flavia Pennetta were the defending champions, but Pennetta chose not to participate this year. Kirilenko partnered with Sorana Cîrstea but lost to Julie Coin and Marie-Ève Pelletier in the quarterfinals.

== Seeds ==
1. (Romania) Sorana Cîrstea / (Russia) Maria Kirilenko (quarterfinals)
2. (Israel) Shahar Pe'er / (China) Yan Zi (quarterfinals, Pe'er: foot injury)
3. (United States) Raquel Kops-Jones / (United States) Abigail Spears (champions)
4. (China) Sun Tiantian / (France) Aurélie Védy (first round)

== Draw ==
Key

- Q = Qualifier
- WC = Wild card
- LL = Lucky loser
- Alt = Alternate
- ITF = ITF entry
- PR = Protected ranking
- SR = Special ranking
- SE = Special exempt
- JE = Junior exempt
- JR = Junior Accelerator Programme entrant
- CO = College Accelerator Programme entrant
- NG = Next Gen Accelerator Program entrant
- w/o = Walkover
- r = Retired
- d = Defaulted

First round

Quarterfinals

Semifinals

Final

1
(Romania) S Cîrstea
(Russia) M Kirilenko
6
6

- (Russia) E Ivanova
- (Belarus) A Yakimova
3
4

1
- (Romania) S Cîrstea
- (Russia) M Kirilenko
3
6
[7]

(France) J Coin
(Canada) M-È Pelletier
7
4
[10]

(France) J Coin
(Canada) M-È Pelletier
6
1
[10]

- (Estonia) M Ani
- (Germany) K Barrois
6^{5}
6
[4]

- (France) J Coin
- (Canada) M-È Pelletier
6
5
[3]

3
(United States) R Kops-Jones
(United States) A Spears
3
6
[10]

3
(United States) R Kops-Jones
(United States) A Spears
3
7
[10]

- (Czech Republic) P Cetkovská
- (Argentina) ME Salerni
6
3
[5]

3
(United States) R Kops-Jones
(United States) A Spears
7
1
[10]

- (Hungary) M Czink
- (South Africa) N Grandin
2
6
[5]

- (Romania) A Dulgheru
- (Portugal) N Silva
5
6
[4]

(Romania) A Dulgheru
(Portugal) N Silva
6
4
[10]

3
- (United States) R Kops-Jones
- (United States) A Spears
2
6
[10]

- (Australia) J Groth
- (Portugal) F Piedade
3
3

- (Canada) S Fichman
- (Hungary) K Marosi
6
3
[5]

(Russia) V Diatchenko
(Belarus) E Dzehalveich
6
6

(Russia) V Diatchenko
(Belarus) E Dzehalveich
6
6

(Japan) K Date-Krumm
(Belgium) Y Wickmayer
6
2
[10]

- (Japan) K Date-Krumm
- (Belgium) Y Wickmayer
0
1

4
- (China) T Sun
- (France) A Védy
0
6
[4]

- (Russia) V Diatchenko
- (Belarus) E Dzehalveich
4
6
[7]

- (Ukraine) Y Beygelzimer
- (South Africa) C Scheepers
3
2

(Canada) S Fichman
(Hungary) K Marosi
6
4
[10]

(Canada) S Fichman
(Hungary) K Marosi
6
6

(Canada) S Fichman
(Hungary) K Marosi

- (Belarus) O Govortsova
- (Russia) A Rodionova
2
4

2
- (Israel) S Pe'er
- (China) Z Yan
w/o

2
(Israel) S Pe'er
(China) Z Yan
6
6
