= 2010 Italian Open – Men's doubles =

Men's doubles
- 2010 Italian Open

Final
- Champions: (United States) Bob Bryan (United States) Mike Bryan
- Runners-up: (United States) John Isner (United States) Sam Querrey
- Score: 6–2, 6–3

Events
Singles	men	women
Doubles	men	women
← 2009 ·	Italian Open	· 2011 →

Daniel Nestor and Nenad Zimonjić were the defending champions, but lost in the second round to Pablo Cuevas and Juan Mónaco.
Bob Bryan and Mike Bryan defeated their compatriots John Isner and Sam Querrey in the final. They won 6–2, 6–3.

== Seeds ==
All seeds receive a bye into the second round.

1. (Canada) Daniel Nestor / (Serbia) Nenad Zimonjić (second round)
2. (United States) Bob Bryan / (United States) Mike Bryan (champions)
3. (Czech Republic) Lukáš Dlouhý / (India) Leander Paes (quarterfinals)
4. (India) Mahesh Bhupathi / (Belarus) Max Mirnyi (second round)
5. (South Africa) Wesley Moodie / (Belgium) Dick Norman (second round)
6. (Sweden) Simon Aspelin / (Australia) Paul Hanley (second round)
7. (Poland) Łukasz Kubot / (Austria) Oliver Marach (semifinals)
8. (The Bahamas) Mark Knowles / (Brazil) Bruno Soares (second round)

== Draw ==
=== Key ===
- Q = Qualifier
- WC = Wild card
- LL = Lucky loser
- Alt = Alternate
- SE = Special exempt
- PR = Protected ranking
- ITF = ITF entry
- JE = Junior exempt
- w/o = Walkover
- r = Retired
- d = Defaulted
- SR = Special ranking

=== Finals ===
Semifinals

Final

- (Uruguay) Pablo Cuevas
- (Argentina) Juan Mónaco
6^{5}
6^{2}

- (United States) John Isner
- (United States) Sam Querrey
7
7

- (United States) John Isner
- (United States) Sam Querrey
2
3

2
- (United States) Bob Bryan
- (United States) Mike Bryan
6
6

7
(Poland) Łukasz Kubot
(Austria) Oliver Marach
1
2

2
- (United States) Bob Bryan
- (United States) Mike Bryan
6
6

=== Top half ===
First round

Second round

Quarterfinals

Semifinals

1
- (Canada) D Nestor
- (Serbia) N Zimonjić
2
6^{4}

- (Uruguay) P Cuevas
- (Argentina) J Mónaco
3
7
[10]

- (Uruguay) P Cuevas
- (Argentina) J Mónaco
6
7

- (France) J Benneteau
- (France) J Chardy
6
5
[8]

- (Uruguay) P Cuevas
- (Argentina) J Mónaco
6
6

- (Russia) I Andreev
- (Russia) M Youzhny
4
2

WC
- (Italy) S Bolelli
- (Italy) P Starace
4
4

WC
- (Italy) S Bolelli
- (Italy) P Starace
6
6

WC
- (Italy) S Bolelli
- (Italy) P Starace
6
6^{3}
[10]

8
- (The Bahamas) M Knowles
- (Brazil) B Soares
3
7
[3]

- (Uruguay) P Cuevas
- (Argentina) J Mónaco
6^{5}
6^{2}

- (United States) J Isner
- (United States) S Querrey
7
7

4
- (India) M Bhupathi
- (Belarus) M Mirnyi
2
7
[6]

- (United States) J Isner
- (United States) S Querrey
4
6
[10]

- (United States) J Isner
- (United States) S Querrey
6
6^{5}
[10]

- (France) J-W Tsonga
- (Switzerland) S Wawrinka
6
2
[7]

- (United States) J Isner
- (United States) S Querrey
6
6

WC
- (Switzerland) Y Allegro
- (Switzerland) R Federer
6
7

WC
- (Switzerland) Y Allegro
- (Switzerland) R Federer
4
4

- (Sweden) J Brunström
- (Netherlands Antilles) J-J Rojer
4
6^{4}

WC
- (Switzerland) Y Allegro
- (Switzerland) R Federer
4
6
[10]

6
- (Sweden) S Aspelin
- (Australia) P Hanley
6
3
[8]

=== Bottom half ===
First round

Second round

Quarterfinals

Semifinals

7
(Poland) Ł Kubot
(Austria) O Marach
6
6

ALT
- (Serbia) J Tipsarević
- (Serbia) V Troicki
6
6

ALT
- (Serbia) J Tipsarević
- (Serbia) V Troicki
4
0

- (Poland) M Fyrstenberg
- (Poland) M Matkowski
3
3

7
(Poland) Ł Kubot
(Austria) O Marach
6
6

- (Croatia) I Ljubičić
- (France) M Llodra
6
6

3
- (Czech Republic) L Dlouhý
- (India) L Paes
3
4

- (Austria) J Knowle
- (Israel) A Ram
4
3

- (Croatia) I Ljubičić
- (France) M Llodra

3
- (Czech Republic) L Dlouhý
- (India) L Paes
w/o

7
(Poland) Ł Kubot
(Austria) O Marach
1
2

2
- (United States) B Bryan
- (United States) M Bryan
6
6

5
- (South Africa) W Moodie
- (Belgium) D Norman
1
6
[8]

- (Spain) F López
- (Spain) F Verdasco
2
6^{3}

- (Spain) N Almagro
- (Spain) M Granollers
6
3
[10]

- (Spain) N Almagro
- (Spain) M Granollers
6
7

- (Spain) N Almagro
- (Spain) M Granollers
3
6
[6]

- (Australia) J Kerr
- (Slovakia) F Polášek
2
3

2
- (United States) B Bryan
- (United States) M Bryan
6
3
[10]

- (Czech Republic) F Čermák
- (Slovakia) M Mertiňák
6
6

- (Czech Republic) F Čermák
- (Slovakia) M Mertiňák
4
1

2
- (United States) B Bryan
- (United States) M Bryan
6
6
