= 2010 Italian Open (tennis) =

- Date: 24 April – 2 May (men); 30 April – 8 May (women)
- Edition: 67th
- Surface: Clay /outdoor
- Location: Rome, Italy
- Venue: Foro Italico

Champions

Men's singles
- (Spain) Rafael Nadal

Women's singles
- (Spain) María José Martínez Sánchez

Men's doubles
- (United States) Bob Bryan / (United States) Mike Bryan

Women's doubles
- (Argentina) Gisela Dulko / (Italy) Flavia Pennetta
- Italian Open

The 2010 Italian Open (also known as the 2010 Rome Masters and sponsored title 2010 Internazionali BNL d'Italia) was a tennis tournament, being played on outdoor clay courts at the Foro Italico in Rome, Italy. It was the 67th edition of the event and was classified as an ATP World Tour Masters 1000 event on the 2010 ATP World Tour and a Premier 5 event on the 2010 WTA Tour. The men's event took place from April 24 to May 2, 2010, while the women's event took place from April 30 to May 8, 2010.

== Finals ==
=== Men's singles ===
(Spain) Rafael Nadal defeated (Spain) David Ferrer, 7–5, 6–2

- It was Nadal's second title of the year and 38th of his career. It was his 5th win at Rome, also winning in 2005, 2006, 2007, and 2009.

=== Women's singles ===
(Spain) María José Martínez Sánchez defeated (Serbia) Jelena Janković, 7–6(5), 7–5

- It was Martínez Sánchez' first title of the year and 3rd of her career.

=== Men's doubles ===
(United States) Bob Bryan / (United States) Mike Bryan defeated (United States) John Isner / (United States) Sam Querrey, 6–2, 6–3

=== Women's doubles ===
(Argentina) Gisela Dulko / (Italy) Flavia Pennetta defeated (Spain) Nuria Llagostera Vives / (Spain) María José Martínez Sánchez, 6–4, 6–2

== ATP entrants ==
=== Seeds ===
Athlete	Nationality	Ranking*	Seeding
Roger Federer	Switzerland	1	1
Novak Djokovic	Serbia	2	2
Rafael Nadal	Spain	3	3
Andy Murray	Great Britain	5	4
Robin Söderling	Sweden	8	5
Fernando Verdasco	Spain	9	6
Jo-Wilfried Tsonga	France	10	7
Marin Čilić	Croatia	11	8
Mikhail Youzhny	Russia	13	9
Tomáš Berdych	Czech Republic	14	10
Ivan Ljubičić	Croatia	15	11
Juan Carlos Ferrero	Spain	16	12
David Ferrer	Spain	17	13
John Isner	United States	22	14
Sam Querrey	United States	23	15
Juan Mónaco	Argentina	24	16

- Rankings are as of April 19, 2010.

=== Other entrants ===
The following players received wildcards into the main draw:

- (Italy) Simone Bolelli
- (Italy) Paolo Lorenzi
- (Italy) Potito Starace
- (Italy) Filippo Volandri

The following player received special exempt into the main draw:

- (Netherlands) Thiemo de Bakker

The following players received entry via qualifying:

- (Argentina) Juan Ignacio Chela
- (Colombia) Santiago Giraldo
- (Spain) Marcel Granollers
- (Czech Republic) Jan Hájek
- (France) Michaël Llodra
- (Australia) Peter Luczak
- (Argentina) Leonardo Mayer

The following player received the lucky loser spot:

- (Germany) Simon Greul

=== Withdrawals ===
The following notable players withdrew from the event:

- (Russia) Nikolay Davydenko (broken wrist)
- (Argentina) Juan Martín del Potro (right wrist)
- (Germany) Tommy Haas (right hip surgery)
- (Chile) Fernando González (knee injury)
- (Croatia) Ivo Karlović (achilles heel injury)
- (France) Gaël Monfils (left wrist)
- (Argentina) David Nalbandian (right leg)
- (Spain) Tommy Robredo (back injury)
- (United States) Andy Roddick (free exemption)
- (France) Gilles Simon (right knee)
- (Czech Republic) Radek Štěpánek (fatigue)

== WTA entrants ==
=== Seeds ===
Athlete	Nationality	Ranking*	Seeding
Serena Williams	United States	1	1
Caroline Wozniacki	Denmark	2	2
Dinara Safina	Russia	3	3
Venus Williams	United States	4	4
Svetlana Kuznetsova	Russia	5	5
Elena Dementieva	Russia	6	6
Jelena Janković	Serbia	7	7
Agnieszka Radwańska	Poland	8	8
Victoria Azarenka	Belarus	9	9
Samantha Stosur	Australia	10	10
Yanina Wickmayer	Belgium	12	11
Flavia Pennetta	Italy	15	12
Francesca Schiavone	Italy	17	13
Nadia Petrova	Russia	18	14
Vera Zvonareva	Russia	19	15
Shahar Pe'er	Israel	20	16

- Rankings are as of April 19, 2010.

=== Other entrants ===
The following players received wildcards into the main draw:

- (Italy) Maria Elena Camerin
- (Italy) Corinna Dentoni
- (Italy) Romina Oprandi
- (United States) Serena Williams

The following players received entry via qualifying:

- (Uzbekistan) Akgul Amanmuradova
- (Hungary) Gréta Arn
- (Serbia) Bojana Jovanovski
- (Kazakhstan) Sesil Karatantcheva
- (United States) Varvara Lepchenko
- (United States) Bethanie Mattek-Sands
- (Japan) Ayumi Morita
- (Croatia) Karolina Šprem

The following player received the lucky loser spot:

- (France) Pauline Parmentier

=== Withdrawals ===
The following notable player withdrew from the event:

- (Australia) Samantha Stosur (Fatigue, Sore Right Arm)
