= Magali de Lattre =

Portuguese tennis player (born 1987)

- Country (sports): Portugal
- Residence: Sintra, Portugal
- Born: 14 June 1987 (age 37); Lausanne, Switzerland
- Height: 1.65 m (5 ft 5 in)
- Turned pro: 2003
- Retired: 2011
- Plays: Right (two-handed backhand)
- Prize money: $69,731

Singles
- Career record: 186–143
- Career titles: 9 ITF
- Highest ranking: No. 334 (20 June 2011)

Doubles
- Career record: 64–61
- Career titles: 4 ITF
- Highest ranking: No. 523 (28 July 2008)

Team competitions
- Fed Cup: 4–8

Magali de Lattre (born 14 June 1987) is a former tennis player from Portugal. She reached a career-high singles ranking of world No. 334 on 20 June 2011, and peaked at No. 523 in the doubles rankings on 28 July 2008.

== Career ==
De Lattre represented Portugal in Fed Cup where she has a singles win–loss record of 3–5 and doubles win–loss record of 1–3 (4–8 overall). She retired on 15 September 2011, at the age of 24, due to the lack of sponsor support.

Lattre received a wildcard to play in the doubles draw of the Dubai Tennis Championships in 2011. However, she and Fatma Al-Nabhani were eliminated in the first round.

== ITF Circuit finals ==
=== Singles: 14 (9–5) ===
Legend $50,000 tournaments $25,000 tournaments $10,000 tournaments	Finals by surface Hard (7–3) Clay (1–2) Carpet (1–0)

Outcome	No.	Date	Location	Surface	Opponent	Score
Runner-up	1.	9 July 2005	Getxo	Clay	(Italy) Stefania Chieppa	1–6, 3–6
Winner	1.	23 October 2005	Porto Santo	Hard	(Netherlands) Chayenne Ewijk	7–5, 6–1
Runner-up	2.	26 February 2006	Portimão	Hard	(Slovenia) Polona Reberšak	5–7, 4–6
Winner	2.	5 July 2008	Damascus	Hard	(Bulgaria) Jaklin Alawi	7–5, 6–2
Winner	3.	19 July 2008	Casablanca	Clay	(France) Chloé Babet	5–7, 6–2, 6–3
Winner	4.	22 November 2008	Dubai	Hard	(Romania) Alexandra Damaschin	6–3, 6–1
Winner	5.	11 July 2009	Gaziantep	Hard	(Georgia (country)) Manana Shapakidze	7–6^{(6)}, 6–3
Runner-up	3.	26 July 2009	Istanbul	Hard	(Russia) Avgusta Tsybysheva	2–6, 6–4, 4–6
Runner-up	4.	11 October 2009	Antalya	Clay	(Russia) Nanuli Pipiya	4–6, 6–4, 6–7^{(4)}
Winner	6.	19 June 2010	Montemor-o-Novo	Hard	(Spain) Arabela Fernández Rabener	3–6, 6–4, 6–4
Winner	7.	26 June 2010	Alcobaça	Hard	(Australia) Shayna McDowell	2–6, 6–3, 6–3
Runner-up	5.	15 August 2010	Istanbul	Hard	(Turkey) Pemra Özgen	2–6, 0–5 ret.
Winner	8.	5 June 2011	Cantanhede	Carpet	(Venezuela) Andrea Gámiz	6–2, 6–4
Winner	9.	12 June 2011	Amarante	Hard	(Portugal) Bárbara Luz	6–1, 6–1

=== Doubles: 11 (4–7) ===
Legend $25,000 tournaments $10,000 tournaments	Finals by surface Hard (3–5) Clay (1–2)

Outcome	No.	Date	Location	Surface	Partner	Opponents	Score
Runner-up	1.	26 February 2006	Portimão	Hard	(Brazil) Joana Cortez	(Netherlands) Sanne van den Biggelaar (Netherlands) Suzanne van Hartingsveldt	w/o
Runner-up	2.	23 March 2008	Amiens	Clay (i)	(Sweden) Madeleine Saari–Bystrom	(Poland) Olga Brózda (Belarus) Volha Duko	2–6, 3–6
Runner-up	3.	6 July 2008	Damascus	Hard	(India) Shivika Burman	(Turkey) Eylul Benli (Australia) Jade Hopper	1–6, 2–6
Winner	1.	21 November 2008	Dubai	Hard	(Oman) Fatma Al-Nabhani	(Russia) Alexandra Artamonova (Belarus) Vladislava Kuzmenkova	6–2, 2–6, [10–3]
Runner-up	4.	10 October 2009	Antalya	Clay	(Morocco) Fatima El Allami	(Romania) Mihaela Buzărnescu (Czech Republic) Kateřina Vaňková	1–6, 1–6
Winner	2.	26 March 2010	Fujairah	Hard	(Oman) Fatma Al-Nabhani	(Italy) Martina Caciotti (Italy) Nicole Clerico	2–6, 7–6^{(5)}, [10–8]
Runner-up	5.	12 June 2010	Amarante	Hard	(Australia) Jade Hopper	(Canada) Mélanie Gloria (Mexico) Daniela Múñoz Gallegos	4–6, 2–6
Winner	3.	6 August 2010	Gaziantep	Hard	(Oman) Fatma Al-Nabhani	(Australia) Jade Hopper (Australia) Daniela Scivetti	6–3, 6–2
Runner-up	6.	14 August 2010	Istanbul	Hard	(Oman) Fatma Al-Nabhani	(Turkey) Başak Eraydın (Bulgaria) Isabella Shinikova	3–6, 6–3, [4–10]
Winner	4.	13 August 2011	Istanbul	Clay	(United Kingdom) Lisa Whybourn	(Georgia (country)) Sofia Kvatsabaia (Bulgaria) Isabella Shinikova	6–3, 2–6, [12–10]
Runner-up	7.	11 September 2011	Antalya	Hard	(Germany) Christina Shakovets	(Turkey) Hülya Esen (Turkey) Lütfiye Esen	5–7, 5–7
