= 1998 Thalgo Australian Women's Hardcourts – Singles =

Singles
- 1998 Thalgo Australian Women's Hardcourts

Final
- Champion: (Japan) Ai Sugiyama
- Runner-up: (Venezuela) Maria Vento
- Score: 7–5, 6–0

Details
- Draw: 30
- Seeds: 8

Events
Singles	Doubles
← 1997 ·	Australian Hard Court Championships	· 1999 →

Elena Likhovtseva was the defending champion but lost in the second round to Maria Vento.

Ai Sugiyama won in the final 7–5, 6–0 against Vento.

== Seeds ==
A champion seed is indicated in bold text while text in italics indicates the round in which that seed was eliminated. The top two seeds received a bye to the second round.

1. (Netherlands) Brenda Schultz-McCarthy (quarterfinals)
2. (Romania) Ruxandra Dragomir (quarterfinals)
3. n/a
4. (Japan) **Ai Sugiyama (champion)**
5. (Switzerland) Patty Schnyder (second round)
6. (South Africa) Joannette Kruger (first round)
7. (Russia) Elena Likhovtseva (second round)
8. (France) Anne-Gaëlle Sidot (first round)

== Draw ==
=== Key ===
- Q = Qualifier
- WC = Wild card
- LL = Lucky loser
- Alt = Alternate
- SE = Special exempt
- PR = Protected ranking
- ITF = ITF entry
- JE = Junior exempt
- w/o = Walkover
- r = Retired
- d = Defaulted
- SR = Special ranking

=== Final ===
Final
	(Venezuela) Maria Vento	5	0
4	(Japan) **Ai Sugiyama**	**7**	**6**

=== Section 1 ===
First round
WC	(Australia) N Pratt	5	2
(United States) **C Morariu**	**7**	**6**
(Spain) M Serna	3	4
(Venezuela) **M Vento**	**6**	**6**
(Belarus) O Barabanschikova	**6**	1	1
7	(Russia) **E Likhovtseva**	2	**6**	**6**
LL	(Germany) **J Kandarr**	4	**6**	**6**
(Switzerland) E Gagliardi	**6**	4	3
(Belgium) L Courtois	**7**	4	5
(South Africa) **M de Swardt**	5	**6**	**7**
WC	(Australia) K Kunce	3	2
Q	(Austria) **S Plischke**	**6**	**6**
(Italy) R Grande	4	4
5	(Switzerland) **P Schnyder**	**6**	**6**

Second round
1	(Netherlands) **B Schultz-McCarthy**	**6**	**6**
(United States) C Morariu	4	2
(Venezuela) **M Vento**	**7**	**6**
7	(Russia) E Likhovtseva	5	4
LL	(Germany) J Kandarr	4	**6**	1
(South Africa) **M de Swardt**	**6**	2	**6**
Q	(Austria) **S Plischke**	6	**6**	**6**
5	(Switzerland) P Schnyder	**7**	4	4

Quarterfinals
1	(Netherlands) B Schultz-McCarthy	0	r
(Venezuela) **M Vento**	**4**
(South Africa) M de Swardt	6	4
Q	(Austria) **S Plischke**	**7**	**6**

Semifinals
(Venezuela) **M Vento**	**6**	**6**
Q	(Austria) S Plischke	2	3

=== Section 2 ===
First round
6	(South Africa) J Kruger	2	**6**	2
(France) **S Pitkowski**	**6**	3	**6**
(Czech Republic) **D Chládková**	**7**	2	**7**
Q	(Japan) M Endo	6	**6**	6
Q	(Australia) **C Barclay**	**7**	**7**
(Spain) M Sánchez Lorenzo	5	6
(Bulgaria) M Maleeva	5	2
4	(Japan) **A Sugiyama**	**7**	**6**
8	(France) A-G Sidot	**6**	3	3
(Chinese Taipei) **S-T Wang**	3	**6**	**6**
(Australia) **R McQuillan**	**6**	**6**
(Australia) K-A Guse	1	1
Q	(Chinese Taipei) J Lee	**7**	3	5
(Poland) **M Grzybowska**	5	**6**	**7**

Second round
(France) **S Pitkowski**	**6**	**7**
(Czech Republic) D Chládková	1	5
Q	(Australia) C Barclay	6	1
4	(Japan) **A Sugiyama**	**7**	**6**
(Chinese Taipei) **S-T Wang**	1	**6**	**6**
(Australia) R McQuillan	**6**	4	4
(Poland) M Grzybowska	6	4
2	(Romania) **R Dragomir**	**7**	**6**

Quarterfinals
(France) S Pitkowski	0	5
4	(Japan) **A Sugiyama**	**6**	**7**
(Chinese Taipei) **S-T Wang**	**6**	5	**6**
2	(Romania) R Dragomir	3	**7**	3

Semifinals
4	(Japan) **A Sugiyama**	**6**	**7**
(Chinese Taipei) S-T Wang	4	5
