= 1997 Gold Coast Classic – Doubles =

Coordinates: 27.8717°S 153.3504°E

Doubles
- 1997 Gold Coast Classic

Final
- Champions: (Japan) Naoko Kijimuta (Japan) Nana Miyagi
- Runners-up: (Romania) Ruxandra Dragomir (Italy) Silvia Farina
- Score: 7–6, 6–1

Details
- Draw: 16
- Seeds: 4

Events
Singles	Doubles
Australian Hard Court Championships	· 1998 →

The 1997 Gold Coast Classic doubles was a tennis competition as part of the 1997 Gold Coast Classic, a tennis tournament played on outdoor hard courts at the Hope Island Resort Tennis Centre in Hope Island, Queensland in Australia that was part of Tier III of the 1997 WTA Tour. The tournament was held from 30 December 1996 through 5 January 1997.

Naoko Kijimuta and Nana Miyagi won in the final 7–6, 6–1 against Ruxandra Dragomir and Silvia Farina.

== Seeds ==
Champion seeds are indicated in bold text while text in italics indicates the round in which those seeds were eliminated.

1. (Argentina) Patricia Tarabini / (Netherlands) Caroline Vis (semifinals)
2. (Belgium) Els Callens / (Czech Republic) Helena Suková (first round)
3. (Japan) **Naoko Kijimuta** / (Japan) **Nana Miyagi (champions)**
4. (Belgium) Sabine Appelmans / (Germany) Barbara Rittner (first round)

== Draw ==
=== Key ===
- Q = Qualifier
- WC = Wild card
- LL = Lucky loser
- Alt = Alternate
- ITF = ITF entry
- PR = Protected ranking
- SR = Special ranking
- SE = Special exempt
- JE = Junior exempt
- JR = Junior Accelerator Programme entrant
- CO = College Accelerator Programme entrant
- NG = Next Gen Accelerator Program entrant
- w/o = Walkover
- r = Retired
- d = Defaulted

First round
1	(Argentina) **P Tarabini** (Netherlands) **C Vis**	**6**	**6**
(Australia) C Barclay (Australia) K-A Guse	2	4
WC	(Australia) G Biggs (Australia) A Jensen	4	2
(Russia) **E Likhovtseva** (United Kingdom) **C Wood**	**6**	**6**
3	(Japan) **N Kijimuta** (Japan) **N Miyagi**	**6**	**6**
(United States) C Morariu (United States) M Werdel-Witmeyer	4	1
(Australia) **R McQuillan** (Australia) **K Radford**	**6**	6	**6**
(Australia) A Ellwood (Australia) N Pratt	3	**7**	1
(Italy) **R Grande** (Japan) **A Sugiyama**	**1**
(United States) E deLone (Chinese Taipei) S-T Wang	1	r
Q	(Belarus) **O Barabanschikova** (Czech Republic) **L Richterová**	**6**	**6**
4	(Belgium) S Appelmans (Germany) B Rittner	4	3
(Romania) **R Dragomir** (Italy) **S Farina**	4	**6**	**6**
(Hungary) V Csurgo (Argentina) P Suárez	**6**	3	1
(France) **A-G Sidot** (France) **S Testud**	**7**	**6**
2	(Belgium) E Callens (Czech Republic) H Suková	6	1

Quarterfinals
1	(Argentina) **P Tarabini** (Netherlands) **C Vis**	**6**	**6**
(Russia) E Likhovtseva (United Kingdom) C Wood	1	3
3	(Japan) **N Kijimuta** (Japan) **N Miyagi**	**7**	**6**
(Australia) R McQuillan (Australia) K Radford	6	1
(Italy) R Grande (Japan) A Sugiyama	**6**	6	3
Q	(Belarus) **O Barabanschikova** (Czech Republic) **L Richterová**	2	**7**	**6**
(Romania) **R Dragomir** (Italy) **S Farina**	**6**	**6**
(France) A-G Sidot (France) S Testud	2	3

Semifinals
1	(Argentina) P Tarabini (Netherlands) C Vis	0	3
3	(Japan) **N Kijimuta** (Japan) **N Miyagi**	**6**	**6**
Q	(Belarus) O Barabanschikova (Czech Republic) L Richterová	**6**	0	5
(Romania) **R Dragomir** (Italy) **S Farina**	4	**6**	**7**

Final
3	(Japan) **Naoko Kijimuta** (Japan) **Nana Miyagi**	**7**	**6**
(Romania) Ruxandra Dragomir (Italy) Silvia Farina	6	1
