= 1997 Gold Coast Classic – Singles =

Coordinates: 27.8717°S 153.3504°E

Singles
- 1997 Gold Coast Classic

Final
- Champion: (Russia) Elena Likhovtseva
- Runner-up: (Japan) Ai Sugiyama
- Score: 3–6, 7–6, 6–3

Details
- Draw: 30
- Seeds: 8

Events
Singles	Doubles
Australian Hard Court Championships	· 1998 →

The 1997 Gold Coast Classic singles was a tennis competition as part of the 1997 Gold Coast Classic, a tennis tournament played on outdoor hard courts at the Hope Island Resort Tennis Centre in Hope Island, Queensland in Australia that was part of Tier III of the 1997 WTA Tour. The tournament was held from 30 December 1996 through 5 January 1997.

Elena Likhovtseva won in the final 3–6, 7–6, 6–3 against Ai Sugiyama.

== Seeds ==
A champion seed is indicated in bold text while text in italics indicates the round in which that seed was eliminated. The top two seeds received a bye to the second round.

1. (Netherlands) Brenda Schultz-McCarthy (semifinals)
2. (Austria) Barbara Paulus (second round)
3. (Russia) **Elena Likhovtseva (champion)**
4. (Belgium) Sabine Appelmans (semifinals)
5. (Romania) Ruxandra Dragomir (first round)
6. (Japan) Ai Sugiyama (final)
7. (Slovakia) Katarína Studeníková (first round)
8. (Italy) Silvia Farina (first round)

== Draw ==
=== Key ===
- Q = Qualifier
- WC = Wild card
- LL = Lucky loser
- Alt = Alternate
- ITF = ITF entry
- PR = Protected ranking
- SR = Special ranking
- SE = Special exempt
- JE = Junior exempt
- JR = Junior Accelerator Programme entrant
- CO = College Accelerator Programme entrant
- NG = Next Gen Accelerator Program entrant
- w/o = Walkover
- r = Retired
- d = Defaulted

=== Final ===
Final
3	(Russia) **Elena Likhovtseva**	3	**7**	**6**
6	(Japan) Ai Sugiyama	**6**	6	3

=== Section 1 ===
First round
(Netherlands) **M Oremans**	4	**6**	**6**
(United States) M Werdel-Witmeyer	**6**	4	4
WC	(Australia) **A Ellwood**	**7**	**6**
(Germany) S Hack	5	2
Q	(Spain) **M Serna**	**6**	**7**
5	(Romania) R Dragomir	4	6
3	(Russia) **E Likhovtseva**	**6**	**7**
(Argentina) P Suárez	1	5
Q	(Romania) **C Cristea**	**6**	**6**
(Czech Republic) H Suková	4	4
WC	(Australia) **R McQuillan**	6	**6**	**6**
(Chinese Taipei) S-T Wang	**7**	4	3
(Germany) **B Rittner**	**7**	**6**
8	(Italy) S Farina	5	4

Second round
1	(Netherlands) **B Schultz-McCarthy**	**7**	**6**
(Netherlands) M Oremans	6	0
WC	(Australia) A Ellwood	3	4
Q	(Spain) **M Serna**	**6**	**6**
3	(Russia) **E Likhovtseva**	**6**	**6**
Q	(Romania) C Cristea	3	4
WC	(Australia) **R McQuillan**	**6**	**6**
(Germany) B Rittner	3	4

Quarterfinals
1	(Netherlands) **B Schultz-McCarthy**	**6**	**6**
Q	(Spain) M Serna	1	4
3	(Russia) **E Likhovtseva**	3	**6**	**7**
WC	(Australia) R McQuillan	**6**	3	6

Semifinals
1	(Netherlands) B Schultz-McCarthy	4	3
3	(Russia) **E Likhovtseva**	**6**	**6**

=== Section 2 ===
First round
6	(Japan) **A Sugiyama**	5	**6**	**6**
(Japan) N Miyagi	**7**	1	1
(Japan) N Kijimuta	2	1
(Italy) **R Grande**	**6**	**6**
Q	(France) **N Dechy**	**6**	**6**
(Belgium) E Callens	4	2
(France) S Testud	4	4
4	(Belgium) **S Appelmans**	**6**	**6**
7	(Slovakia) K Studeníková	4	r
(France) **A-G Sidot**	**6**
Q	(Germany) **J Kandarr**	**6**	**6**
(Switzerland) P Schnyder	4	3
(United States) A Miller	6	3
(Sweden) **Å Carlsson**	**7**	**6**

Second round
6	(Japan) **A Sugiyama**	6	**6**	**6**
(Italy) R Grande	**7**	2	3
Q	(France) N Dechy	**7**	5	4
4	(Belgium) **S Appelmans**	5	**7**	**6**
(France) **A-G Sidot**	**6**	**6**
Q	(Germany) J Kandarr	4	4
(Sweden) **Å Carlsson**	**5**
2	(Austria) B Paulus	0	r

Quarterfinals
6	(Japan) **A Sugiyama**	**6**	3	**7**
4	(Belgium) S Appelmans	2	**6**	6
(France) **A-G Sidot**	**6**	**6**
(Sweden) Å Carlsson	2	2

Semifinals
6	(Japan) **A Sugiyama**	**6**	**6**
(France) A-G Sidot	2	4
