= 1999 Italian Open (tennis) =

- Date: 3–9 May (women); 10–16 May (men)
- Edition: 56th
- Surface: Clay / outdoor
- Location: Rome, Italy
- Venue: Foro Italico

Champions

Men's singles
- (Brazil) Gustavo Kuerten

Women's singles
- (United States) Venus Williams

Men's doubles
- (South Africa) Ellis Ferreira / (United States) Rick Leach

Women's doubles
- (Switzerland) Martina Hingis / (Russia) Anna Kournikova
← 1998 ·	Italian Open	· 2000 →

The 1999 Italian Open was a tennis tournament played on outdoor clay courts. It was the 56th edition of the Italian Open, and was part of the ATP Super 9 of the 1999 ATP Tour, and of the Tier I Series of the 1999 WTA Tour. Both the men's and the women's events took place at the Foro Italico in Rome, Italy.

The men's field was led by ATP No. 2, Rotterdam, Australian Open titlist Yevgeny Kafelnikov, Wimbledon, Vienna winner, Paris runner-up Pete Sampras and Sydney champion, Masters Cup winner Àlex Corretja. Also competing were US Open defending champion Patrick Rafter, London titlist Richard Krajicek, Carlos Moyá, Tim Henman and Marcelo Ríos.

The women's draw was headlined by the WTA No. 1, Australian Open, Tokyo winner, and Sydney finalist Martina Hingis; the Cairo titlist, and Hamburg semi-finalist Arantxa Sánchez Vicario; and the Key Biscayne, Oklahoma, Hamburg champion Venus Williams. Other top seeds were Gold Coast runner-up Mary Pierce, Gold Coast champion Patty Schnyder, Indian Wells champion Serena Williams, and Frenchwomen Nathalie Tauziat and Sandrine Testud.

== Finals ==
=== Men's singles ===
(Brazil) Gustavo Kuerten defeated (Australia) Patrick Rafter, 6–4, 7–5, 7–6^{(8–6)}

- It was Gustavo Kuerten's 2nd title of the year and his 5th overall. It was his 2nd Masters title.

=== Women's singles ===
(United States) Venus Williams defeated (France) Mary Pierce, 6–4, 6–2.

- It was Venus Williams' 4th title of the year and her 7th overall. It was her 2nd Tier I title of the year and her 3rd overall.

=== Men's doubles ===
(South Africa) Ellis Ferreira / (United States) Rick Leach defeated (South Africa) David Adams / (South Africa) John-Laffnie de Jager, 6–7, 6–1, 6–2

=== Women's doubles ===
(Switzerland) Martina Hingis / (Russia) Anna Kournikova defeated (France) Alexandra Fusai / (France) Nathalie Tauziat, 6–2, 6–2.

== WTA entrants ==
=== Seeds ===
Country	Player	Rank	Seed
SUI	Martina Hingis	1	1
ESP	Arantxa Sánchez Vicario	7	2
USA	Venus Williams	5	3
FRA	Mary Pierce	8	4
SUI	Patty Schnyder	12	5
USA	Serena Williams	10	6
FRA	Nathalie Tauziat	9	7
FRA	Sandrine Testud	11	8
RUS	Anna Kournikova	13	9
FRA	Amélie Mauresmo	16	10
BEL	Dominique Van Roost	15	11
RSA	Amanda Coetzer	14	12
ROU	Irina Spîrlea	17	13
BLR	Natasha Zvereva	19	14
ESP	Conchita Martínez	18	15
RUS	Elena Likhovtseva	22	16

=== Other entrants ===
The following players received wildcards into the singles main draw:

- (Italy) Tathiana Garbin
- (Italy) Francesca Lubiani
- (Italy) Adriana Serra Zanetti

The following players received wildcards into the doubles main draw:

- (Italy) Flora Perfetti / (Italy) Francesca Lubiani
- (Italy) Adriana Serra Zanetti / (Italy) Antonella Serra Zanetti

The following players received entry from the singles qualifying draw:

- (Italy) Francesca Schiavone
- (Greece) Christína Papadáki
- (Venezuela) María Vento
- (Belgium) Sabine Appelmans
- (Russia) Elena Dementieva
- (Italy) Antonella Serra Zanetti
- (Italy) Germana Di Natale
- (United States) Sandra Cacic

The following player received entry as a lucky loser:

- (Russia) Tatiana Panova

The following players received entry from the doubles qualifying draw:

- (Paraguay) Larissa Schaerer / (Spain) Magüi Serna

The following players received entry as lucky losers:

- (Germany) Jana Kandarr / (United States) Samantha Reeves
