= 1998 Thalgo Australian Women's Hardcourts =

Coordinates: 27.8717°S 153.3504°E

- Date: 4–10 January
- Edition: 2nd
- Category: Tier III
- Draw: 30S / 16D
- Prize money: $164,250
- Surface: Hard / outdoor
- Location: Hope Island, Queensland, Australia

Champions

Singles
- (Japan) Ai Sugiyama

Doubles
- (Russia) Elena Likhovtseva / (Japan) Ai Sugiyama
← 1997 ·	Australian Hard Court Championships	· 1999 →

The 1998 Thalgo Australian Women's Hardcourts was a women's tennis tournament played on outdoor hard courts at the Hope Island Resort Tennis Centre in Hope Island, Queensland in Australia that was part of Tier III of the 1998 WTA Tour. It was the second edition of the tournament and was held from 4 January through 10 January 1998. Fourth-seeded Ai Sugiyama won the singles title and earned $27,000 first-prize money.

== Finals ==
=== Singles ===
(Japan) Ai Sugiyama defeated (Venezuela) Maria Vento 7–5, 6–0.

- It was Sugiyama's 1st title of the year and the 5th of her career.

=== Doubles ===
(Russia) Elena Likhovtseva / (Japan) 'Ai Sugiyama defeated (South Korea) Sung-Hee Park / (Chinese Taipei) Shi-Ting Wang 1–6, 6–3, 6–4.

- It was Likhovtseva's 1st title of the year and the 3rd of her career. It was Sugiyama's 2nd title of the year and the 6th of her career.
