= 1997 Gold Coast Classic =

Coordinates: 27.8717°S 153.3504°E

- Date: 30 December 1996 – 5 January 1997
- Edition: 1st
- Category: Tier III
- Draw: 30S / 16D
- Prize money: $164,250
- Surface: Hard / outdoor
- Location: Hope Island, Australia
- Venue: Hope Island Resort Tennis Centre

Champions

Singles
- (Russia) Elena Likhovtseva

Doubles
- (Japan) Naoko Kijimuta / (Japan) Nana Miyagi
Australian Hard Court Championships	· 1998 →

The 1997 Gold Coast Classic was a women's tennis tournament played on outdoor hard courts at the Hope Island Resort Tennis Centre in Hope Island, Queensland in Australia that was part of the Tier III category of the 1997 WTA Tour. It was the first edition of the tournament and was held from 30 December 1996 through 5 January 1997. Third-seeded Elena Likhovtseva won the singles title.

== Finals ==
=== Singles ===
(Russia) Elena Likhovtseva defeated (Japan) Ai Sugiyama 3–6, 7–6, 6–3

- It was Likhovtseva's only title of the year and the 2nd of her career.

=== Doubles ===
(Japan) Naoko Kijimuta / (Japan) Nana Miyagi defeated (Romania) Ruxandra Dragomir / (Italy) Silvia Farina 7–6, 6–1

- It was Kijimuta's 1st title of the year and the 3rd of her career. It was Miyagi's 1st title of the year and the 5th of her career.
