= 1999 Thalgo Australian Women's Hardcourts – Doubles =

Doubles
- 1999 Thalgo Australian Women's Hardcourts

Final
- Champions: (United States) Corina Morariu (Latvia) Larisa Neiland
- Runners-up: (Australia) Kristine Kunce (Romania) Irina Spîrlea
- Score: 6–3, 6–3

Events
Singles	Doubles
← 1998 ·	Australian Hard Court Championships	· 2000 →

The 1999 Thalgo Australian Women's Hardcourts doubles was the doubles event of the third edition of the Thalgo Australian Women's Hardcourts; a WTA Tier III tournament held in the Gold Coast. Elena Likhovtseva and Ai Sugiyama were the defending champions but lost in the first round to Anke Huber and Mary Pierce.

Corina Morariu and Larisa Neiland won in the final 6–3, 6–3 against Kristine Kunce and Irina Spîrlea.

== Seeds ==
1. (Russia) Elena Likhovtseva / (Japan) Ai Sugiyama (first round)
2. (South Africa) Mariaan de Swardt / (Ukraine) Elena Tatarkova (first round)
3. (United States) Corina Morariu / (Latvia) Larisa Neiland (champions)
4. (Belgium) Sabine Appelmans / (Switzerland) Patty Schnyder (quarterfinals, withdrew)

== Draw ==
Key

- Q = Qualifier
- WC = Wild card
- LL = Lucky loser
- Alt = Alternate
- ITF = ITF entry
- PR = Protected ranking
- SR = Special ranking
- SE = Special exempt
- JE = Junior exempt
- JR = Junior Accelerator Programme entrant
- CO = College Accelerator Programme entrant
- NG = Next Gen Accelerator Program entrant
- w/o = Walkover
- r = Retired
- d = Defaulted

First round
1	(Russia) E Likhovtseva (Japan) A Sugiyama	7	4	4
(Germany) A Huber (France) M Pierce	5	6	6
(Romania) R Dragomir (Germany) C Singer	7	5	5
(United States) E deLone (Australia) N Pratt	5	7	7
3	(United States) C Morariu (Latvia) L Neiland	6	4	7
(South Africa) L Horn (United States) L Lee	0	6	5
(Canada) S Jeyaseelan (United States) L Wild	6	6
(Belgium) L Courtois (South Africa) N de Villiers	1	3
Q	(Australia) E Dominikovic (Australia) C Watson	5	2
WC	(Australia) A Ellwood (Australia) A Molik	7	6
(Australia) C Barclay (Australia) K-A Guse	3	1
4	(Belgium) S Appelmans (Switzerland) P Schnyder	6	6
(Australia) R McQuillan (Japan) N Miyagi	6	6
(United States) S Reeves (Chinese Taipei) Wang S-t	1	0
(Australia) K Kunce (Romania) I Spîrlea	2	7	6
2	(South Africa) M de Swardt (Ukraine) E Tatarkova	6	5	4

Quarterfinals
(Germany) A Huber (France) M Pierce	2	6	6
(United States) E deLone (Australia) N Pratt	6	3	2
3	(United States) C Morariu (Latvia) L Neiland	7^{7}	6
(Canada) S Jeyaseelan (United States) L Wild	6^{5}	1
WC	(Australia) A Ellwood (Australia) A Molik	w/o
4	(Belgium) S Appelmans (Switzerland) P Schnyder
(Australia) R McQuillan (Japan) N Miyagi	6^{1}	5
(Australia) K Kunce (Romania) I Spîrlea	7^{7}	7

Semifinals
(Germany) A Huber (France) M Pierce	6^{4}	4
3	(United States) C Morariu (Latvia) L Neiland	7^{7}	6
WC	(Australia) A Ellwood (Australia) A Molik	6^{4}	4
(Australia) K Kunce (Romania) I Spîrlea	7^{7}	6

Final
3	(United States) C Morariu (Latvia) L Neiland	6	6
(Australia) K Kunce (Romania) I Spîrlea	3	3

== Qualifying ==
=== Seeds ===
1. (Japan) Rika Hiraki / (Bulgaria) Svetlana Krivencheva (first round)
2. (Canada) Maureen Drake / (United States) Mashona Washington (first round)

=== Qualifiers ===
1. (Australia) Evie Dominikovic / (Australia) Cindy Watson

== Qualifying draw ==
Key

- Q = Qualifier
- WC = Wild card
- LL = Lucky loser
- Alt = Alternate
- ITF = ITF entry
- PR = Protected ranking
- SR = Special ranking
- SE = Special exempt
- JE = Junior exempt
- JR = Junior Accelerator Programme entrant
- CO = College Accelerator Programme entrant
- NG = Next Gen Accelerator Program entrant
- w/o = Walkover
- r = Retired
- d = Defaulted

First round
1	(Japan) Rika Hiraki (Bulgaria) Svetlana Krivencheva	6
WC	(Australia) Evie Dominikovic (Australia) Cindy Watson	8
(Poland) Aleksandra Olsza (France) Noëlle van Lottum	7
(Austria) Sylvia Plischke (Austria) Patricia Wartusch	9
(Italy) Tathiana Garbin (Italy) Francesca Lubiani	6
(Australia) Trudi Musgrave (South Africa) Jessica Steck	8
(Australia) Amanda Grahame (Australia) Bryanne Stewart	8
2	(Canada) Maureen Drake (United States) Mashona Washington	3

Second round
WC	(Australia) Evie Dominikovic (Australia) Cindy Watson	8
(Austria) Sylvia Plischke (Austria) Patricia Wartusch	5
(Australia) Trudi Musgrave (South Africa) Jessica Steck	3
(Australia) Amanda Grahame (Australia) Bryanne Stewart	8

Qualifying competition
WC	(Australia) Evie Dominikovic (Australia) Cindy Watson	8
(Australia) Amanda Grahame (Australia) Bryanne Stewart	3
