= 2003 State Farm Women's Tennis Classic =

Tennis tournament

- Date: February 24 – March 2
- Edition: 4th
- Category: Tier II
- Draw: 28S / 16D
- Prize money: $585,000
- Surface: Hard / outdoor
- Location: Scottsdale, Arizona . U.S.

Champions

Singles
- (Japan) Ai Sugiyama

Doubles
- (Belgium) Kim Clijsters / (Japan) Ai Sugiyama
- State Farm Women's Tennis Classic

The 2003 State Farm Women's Tennis Classic was a women's tennis tournament played on outdoor hard courts in Scottsdale, Arizona, United States that was part of the Tier II category of the 2003 WTA Tour. It was the fourth and last edition of the tournament and ran from February 25 through March 2, 2003. Unseeded Ai Sugiyama won the singles title and earned $93,000 first-prize money.

== Finals ==
=== Singles ===
(Japan) Ai Sugiyama defeated (Belgium) Kim Clijsters 3–6, 7–5, 6–4

- It was Sugiyama' 1st singles title of the year and the 4th of her career.

=== Doubles ===
(Belgium) Kim Clijsters / (Japan) Ai Sugiyama defeated (United States) Lindsay Davenport / (United States) Lisa Raymond 6–1, 6–4
