= 1999 Italian Open – Women's singles =

Women's singles
- 1999 Italian Open

Final
- Champion: (United States) Venus Williams
- Runner-up: (France) Mary Pierce
- Score: 6–4, 6–2

Details
- Draw: 56
- Seeds: 16

Events
Singles	men	women
Doubles	men	women
← 1998 ·	Italian Open	· 2000 →

Venus Williams defeated Mary Pierce in the final, 6–4, 6–2 to win the women's singles tennis title at the 1999 Italian Open.

Martina Hingis was the defending champion, but lost in the semifinals to Williams in a rematch of the previous year's final.

== Seeds ==
The top eight seeds received a bye to the second round.

1. (Switzerland) Martina Hingis (semifinals)
2. (Spain) Arantxa Sánchez Vicario (third round)
3. (United States) Venus Williams (champion)
4. (France) Mary Pierce (final)
5. (Switzerland) Patty Schnyder (third round)
6. (United States) Serena Williams (quarterfinals)
7. (France) Nathalie Tauziat (third round)
8. (France) Sandrine Testud (quarterfinals)
9. (Russia) Anna Kournikova (third round)
10. (France) Amélie Mauresmo (semifinals)
11. (Belgium) Dominique Van Roost (quarterfinals)
12. (South Africa) Amanda Coetzer (second round)
13. (Romania) Irina Spîrlea (third round)
14. (Belarus) Natasha Zvereva (first round)
15. (Spain) Conchita Martínez (third round)
16. (Russia) Elena Likhovtseva (first round)

== Draw ==
=== Key ===
- Q = Qualifier
- WC = Wild card
- LL = Lucky loser
- Alt = Alternate
- ITF = ITF entry
- PR = Protected ranking
- SR = Special ranking
- SE = Special exempt
- JE = Junior exempt
- JR = Junior Accelerator Programme entrant
- CO = College Accelerator Programme entrant
- NG = Next Gen Accelerator Program entrant
- w/o = Walkover
- r = Retired
- d = Defaulted

=== Finals ===
Quarterfinals
1	(Switzerland) Martina Hingis	6	6
6	(United States) Serena Williams	2	2
3	(United States) Venus Williams	7^{7}	6
11	(Belgium) Dominique Van Roost	6^{1}	2
8	(France) Sandrine Testud	4	5
4	(France) Mary Pierce	6	7
10	(France) Amélie Mauresmo	6	6
(Austria) Sylvia Plischke	2	3

Semifinals
1	(Switzerland) Martina Hingis	4	6	4
3	(United States) Venus Williams	6	1	6
4	(France) Mary Pierce	6^{1}	6	6
10	(France) Amélie Mauresmo	7^{7}	2	4

Final
3	(United States) Venus Williams	6	6
4	(France) Mary Pierce	4	2

=== Top half ===
==== Section 1 ====
First round
(France) N Dechy	6	6
(Netherlands) M Oremans	2	2
Q	(Italy) F Schiavone	4	3
(Romania) R Dragomir	6	6
(United States) C Morariu	6	6
16	(Russia) E Likhovtseva	2	1
13	(Romania) I Spîrlea	6	6
(Zimbabwe) C Black	3	0
Q	(Greece) C Papadáki	7^{7}	6
(Ukraine) E Tatarkova	6^{4}	3
(France) A Dechaume-Balleret	0	5
LL	(Russia) T Panova	6	7

Second round
1	(Switzerland) M Hingis	6	6
(France) N Dechy	1	1
(Romania) R Dragomir	2	3
(United States) C Morariu	6	6
13	(Romania) I Spîrlea	6	6
Q	(Greece) C Papadáki	4	0
LL	(Russia) T Panova	2	1
6	(United States) S Williams	6	6

Third round
1	(Switzerland) M Hingis	6	6
(United States) C Morariu	1	4
13	(Romania) I Spîrlea	2	3
6	(United States) S Williams	6	6

Quarterfinals
1	(Switzerland) M Hingis	6	6
6	(United States) S Williams	2	2

==== Section 2 ====
First round
(Spain) G León García	6	6
(Slovakia) K Habšudová	4	3
Q	(Venezuela) M Vento	3	3
(Spain) M Serna	6	6
(Italy) R Grande	7^{7}	3	0^{r}
9	(Russia) A Kournikova	6^{4}	6	3
11	(Belgium) D Van Roost	6	6
(United States) N Arendt	1	0
(Japan) A Sugiyama	5	4
Q	(Belgium) S Appelmans	7	6
(Germany) M Weingärtner	1	4
WC	(Italy) T Garbin	6	6

Second round
3	(United States) V Williams	7	4	6
(Spain) G León García	5	6	4
(Spain) M Serna	4	3
9	(Russia) A Kournikova	6	6
11	(Belgium) D Van Roost	6	6^{2}	6
Q	(Belgium) S Appelmans	4	7^{7}	3
WC	(Italy) T Garbin	4	2
7	(France) N Tauziat	6	6

Third round
3	(United States) V Williams	6	6
9	(Russia) A Kournikova	2	2
11	(Belgium) D Van Roost	6	7^{7}
7	(France) N Tauziat	4	6^{2}

Quarterfinals
3	(United States) V Williams	7^{7}	6
11	(Belgium) D Van Roost	6^{1}	2

=== Bottom half ===
==== Section 3 ====
First round
(Luxembourg) A Kremer	2	6	1
(France) A-G Sidot	6	3	6
(Spain) V Ruano Pascual	6	4	6
(United States) T Snyder	2	6	3
(Israel) A Smashnova	6	6
14	(Belarus) N Zvereva	3	1
15	(Spain) C Martínez	6	6
(Italy) S Farina	4	1
(France) S Pitkowski	6	6
(Spain) M Sánchez Lorenzo	4	3
(France) A Fusai	2	4
(Czech Republic) K Hrdličková	6	7

Second round
8	(France) S Testud	6	6
(France) A-G Sidot	1	1
(United States) T Snyder	3	5
(Israel) A Smashnova	6	7
15	(Spain) C Martínez	6	6
(France) S Pitkowski	3	3
(Czech Republic) K Hrdličková	3	4
4	(France) M Pierce	6	6

Third round
8	(France) S Testud	7	6
(Israel) A Smashnova	5	1
15	(Spain) C Martínez	6	0	6^{2}
4	(France) M Pierce	4	6	7^{7}

Quarterfinals
8	(France) S Testud	4	5
4	(France) M Pierce	6	7

==== Section 4 ====
First round
WC	(Italy) Ad Serra Zanetti	7	7
(South Africa) M de Swardt	5	5
Q	(Russia) E Dementieva	7	7
Q	(Italy) An Serra Zanetti	5	5
(Canada) M Drake	2	1
10	(France) A Mauresmo	6	6
12	(South Africa) A Coetzer	6	6
Q	(Italy) G Di Natale	3	0
WC	(Italy) F Lubiani	2	3
(Austria) S Plischke	6	6
Q	(United States) S Cacic	4	2
(Puerto Rico) K Brandi	6	6

Second round
5	(Switzerland) P Schnyder	6	7
WC	(Italy) Ad Serra Zanetti	2	5
Q	(Russia) E Dementieva	6	3	5
10	(France) A Mauresmo	1	6	7
12	(South Africa) A Coetzer	4	6	1
(Austria) S Plischke	6	2	6
(Puerto Rico) K Brandi	0	2
2	(Spain) A Sánchez Vicario	6	6

Third round
5	(Switzerland) P Schnyder	7	2	4
10	(France) A Mauresmo	5	6	6
(Austria) S Plischke	6	6
2	(Spain) A Sánchez Vicario	4	1

Quarterfinals
10	(France) A Mauresmo	6	6
(Austria) S Plischke	2	3

== Qualifying ==
=== Seeds ===
1. n.a.
2. (Russia) Tatiana Panova (qualifying competition, lucky loser)
3. n.a.
4. (Venezuela) María Vento (qualifier)
5. (Greece) Christína Papadáki (qualifier)
6. (Netherlands) Seda Noorlander (qualifying competition, lucky loser)
7. (Japan) Miho Saeki (first round)
8. (Belgium) Sabine Appelmans (qualifier)
9. (Italy) Laura Golarsa (qualifying competition)
10. (Canada) Sonya Jeyaseelan (first round)

=== Qualifiers ===
1. (Italy) Germana Di Natale
2. (Belgium) Sabine Appelmans
3. (Venezuela) María Vento
4. (Italy) Francesca Schiavone
5. (United States) Sandra Cacic
6. (Russia) Elena Dementieva
7. (Greece) Christína Papadáki
8. (Italy) Antonella Serra Zanetti

=== Lucky losers ===
1. (Russia) Tatiana Panova

== Qualifying draw ==
=== Key ===
- Q = Qualifier
- WC = Wild card
- LL = Lucky loser
- Alt = Alternate
- ITF = ITF entry
- PR = Protected ranking
- SR = Special ranking
- SE = Special exempt
- JE = Junior exempt
- JR = Junior Accelerator Programme entrant
- CO = College Accelerator Programme entrant
- NG = Next Gen Accelerator Program entrant
- w/o = Walkover
- r = Retired
- d = Defaulted

=== First qualifier ===
First round
9	(Italy) Laura Golarsa
Bye
(Italy) Germana Di Natale	6	7
(Russia) Elena Makarova	2	5

Qualifying competition
9	(Italy) Laura Golarsa	4	3
(Italy) Germana Di Natale	6	6

=== Second qualifier ===
First round
WC	(Italy) Maria Elena Camerin	7^{8}	3	6
(Paraguay) Larissa Schaerer	6^{6}	6	2
(Brazil) Vanessa Menga	2	5
8	(Belgium) Sabine Appelmans	6	7

Qualifying competition
WC	(Italy) Maria Elena Camerin	2	2
8	(Belgium) Sabine Appelmans	6	6

=== Third qualifier ===
First round
4	(Venezuela) María Vento	6	6
(Croatia) Marijana Kovačević	0	2
(Russia) Nadia Petrova	6	6
(France) Lea Ghirardi	3	0

Qualifying competition
4	(Venezuela) María Vento	6	7
(Russia) Nadia Petrova	2	5

=== Fourth qualifier ===
First round
Bye
WC	(Italy) Francesca Schiavone
(Slovenia) Barbara Mulej	0	6	1
6	(Netherlands) Seda Noorlander	6	4	6

Qualifying competition
WC	(Italy) Francesca Schiavone	6	7
6	(Netherlands) Seda Noorlander	3	5

=== Fifth qualifier ===
First round
7	(Japan) Miho Saeki	6	5	6^{4}
(United States) Sandra Cacic	2	7	7^{7}
(Italy) Flora Perfetti	6	6
(South Africa) Liezel Horn	2	1

Qualifying competition
(United States) Sandra Cacic	2	6	6
(Italy) Flora Perfetti	6	3	4

=== Sixth qualifier ===
First round
WC	(Italy) Roberta Vinci
Bye
(Russia) Elena Dementieva	3	7^{7}	6
10	(Canada) Sonya Jeyaseelan	6	6^{3}	2

Qualifying competition
WC	(Italy) Roberta Vinci	2	6	2
(Russia) Elena Dementieva	6	4	6

=== Seventh qualifier ===
First round
5	(Greece) Christína Papadáki	7	6
(Argentina) Florencia Labat	5	1
(Germany) Jana Kandarr	6	4	3
(United States) Jill Craybas	3	6	6

Qualifying competition
5	(Greece) Christína Papadáki	6	7^{7}
(United States) Jill Craybas	4	6^{4}

=== Eighth qualifier ===
First round
(Italy) Antonella Serra Zanetti	2	6	6
WC	(Italy) Flavia Pennetta	6	2	3
(United States) Samantha Reeves	2	5
2	(Russia) Tatiana Panova	6	7

Qualifying competition
(Italy) Antonella Serra Zanetti	6	3	7^{7}
2	(Russia) Tatiana Panova	2	6	6^{5}
