= 1999 Italian Open – Women's doubles =

Women's doubles
- 1999 Italian Open

Final
- Champion: (Switzerland) Martina Hingis (Russia) Anna Kournikova
- Runner-up: (France) Alexandra Fusai (France) Nathalie Tauziat
- Score: 6–2, 6–2

Events
Singles	men	women
Doubles	men	women
← 1998 ·	Italian Open	· 2000 →

The 1999 Italian Open doubles was the doubles event of the fifty-fifth edition of the tennis tournament played at Rome, Italy, the most prestigious tennis tournament in Southern Europe. It was the fifth WTA Tier I tournament of the year, and part of the European claycourt season. Virginia Ruano Pascual and Paola Suárez were the defending champions, but lost to Martina Hingis and Anna Kournikova in the quarterfinals.

Hingis and Kournikova won this tournament by defeating Alexandra Fusai and Nathalie Tauziat in the final.

== Seeds ==
The top four seeds received a bye into the second round.

1. (Switzerland) Martina Hingis / (Russia) Anna Kournikova (champions)
2. (France) Alexandra Fusai / (France) Nathalie Tauziat (final)
3. (Russia) Elena Likhovtseva / (Japan) Ai Sugiyama (second round)
4. (South Africa) Mariaan de Swardt / (Ukraine) Elena Tatarkova (quarterfinals)
5. (Latvia) Larisa Neiland / (Spain) Arantxa Sánchez Vicario (second round)
6. (Romania) Irina Spîrlea / (Netherlands) Caroline Vis (semifinals)
7. (Spain) Conchita Martínez / (Argentina) Patricia Tarabini (second round)
8. (Spain) Virginia Ruano Pascual / (Argentina) Paola Suárez (quarterfinals)

== Draw ==
=== Key ===
- Q = Qualifier
- WC = Wild card
- LL = Lucky loser
- Alt = Alternate
- ITF = ITF entry
- PR = Protected ranking
- SR = Special ranking
- SE = Special exempt
- JE = Junior exempt
- JR = Junior Accelerator Programme entrant
- CO = College Accelerator Programme entrant
- NG = Next Gen Accelerator Program entrant
- w/o = Walkover
- r = Retired
- d = Defaulted

=== Finals ===
Semifinals
1	(Switzerland) Martina Hingis (Russia) Anna Kournikova	6	6
6	(Romania) Irina Spîrlea (Netherlands) Caroline Vis	4	3
(France) Mary Pierce (Belarus) Natasha Zvereva	2	1
2	(France) Alexandra Fusai (France) Nathalie Tauziat	6	6

Final
1	(Switzerland) Martina Hingis (Russia) Anna Kournikova	6	6
2	(France) Alexandra Fusai (France) Nathalie Tauziat	2	2

=== Top half ===
First round
(United States) D Graham (Argentina) L Montalvo	6	6
(Canada) M Drake (Italy) L Golarsa	2	1
(Romania) R Dragomir (Czech Republic) K Hrdličková	6	6
(Italy) T Garbin (Italy) R Grande	4	2
(Spain) E Bes-Ostariz (Germany) K Freye	2	5
8	(Spain) V Ruano Pascual (Argentina) P Suárez	6	7
Q	(Paraguay) L Schaerer (Spain) M Serna	6	3	4
(Netherlands) S Noorlander (Greece) C Papadáki	1	6	6
WC	(Italy) F Perfetti (Italy) F Schiavone	2	1
(South Africa) A Coetzer (France) A Mauresmo	6	6
WC	(Italy) Ad Serra Zanetti (Italy) An Serra Zanetti	4	1
6	(Romania) I Spîrlea (Netherlands) C Vis	6	6

Second round
1	(Switzerland) M Hingis (Russia) A Kournikova	6	6
(United States) D Graham (Argentina) L Montalvo	0	0
(Romania) R Dragomir (Czech Republic) K Hrdličková	2	4
8	(Spain) V Ruano Pascual (Argentina) P Suárez	6	6
4	(South Africa) M de Swardt (Ukraine) E Tatarkova	6	6
(Netherlands) S Noorlander (Greece) C Papadáki	1	2
(South Africa) A Coetzer (France) A Mauresmo	1	6	4
6	(Romania) I Spîrlea (Netherlands) C Vis	6	4	6

Quarterfinals
1	(Switzerland) M Hingis (Russia) A Kournikova	3	6	6
8	(Spain) V Ruano Pascual (Argentina) P Suárez	6	1	3
4	(South Africa) M de Swardt (Ukraine) E Tatarkova	6	6^{6}	4
6	(Romania) I Spîrlea (Netherlands) C Vis	2	7^{8}	6

Semifinals
1	(Switzerland) M Hingis (Russia) A Kournikova	6	6
6	(Romania) I Spîrlea (Netherlands) C Vis	4	3

=== Bottom half ===
First round
5	(Latvia) L Neiland (Spain) A Sánchez Vicario	6	6
(United States) N Arendt (Netherlands) M Bollegraf	2	3
(France) M Pierce (Belarus) N Zvereva	6	6
(Belgium) S Appelmans (Netherlands) M Oremans	0	2
(France) A Dechaume-Balleret (France) S Testud	5	7	6
(Argentina) F Labat (Belgium) D Van Roost	7	5	0
7	(Spain) C Martínez (Argentina) P Tarabini	4	6	6
(Zimbabwe) C Black (France) A-G Sidot	6	3	1
(Canada) S Jeyaseelan (United States) C Morariu	7^{7}	6
(Brazil) V Menga (United States) M Saeki	6^{5}	4
LL	(Germany) J Kandarr (United States) S Reeves	4	7^{7}	7
(South Africa) L Horn (Czech Republic) E Melicharová	6	6^{2}	5

Second round
5	(Latvia) L Neiland (Spain) A Sánchez Vicario	2	0
(France) M Pierce (Belarus) N Zvereva	6	6
(France) A Dechaume-Balleret (France) S Testud	6	6
3	(Russia) E Likhovtseva (Japan) A Sugiyama	2	3
7	(Spain) C Martínez (Argentina) P Tarabini	6	4	2
(Canada) S Jeyaseelan (United States) C Morariu	0	6	6
LL	(Germany) J Kandarr (United States) S Reeves	1	1
2	(France) A Fusai (France) N Tauziat	6	6

Quarterfinals
(France) M Pierce (Belarus) N Zvereva	6	7^{7}
(France) A Dechaume-Balleret (France) S Testud	3	6^{3}
(Canada) S Jeyaseelan (United States) C Morariu	5	4
2	(France) A Fusai (France) N Tauziat	7	6

Semifinals
(France) M Pierce (Belarus) N Zvereva	2	1
2	(France) A Fusai (France) N Tauziat	6	6

== Qualifying ==
=== Seeds ===
1. (Germany) Jana Kandarr / (United States) Samantha Reeves (second round, lucky losers)
2. (France) Nathalie Dechy / (Russia) Nadia Petrova (second round)

=== Qualifiers ===
1. (Paraguay) Larissa Schaerer / (Spain) Magüi Serna

=== Lucky losers ===
1. (Germany) Jana Kandarr / (United States) Samantha Reeves

== Qualifying draw ==
=== Key ===
- Q = Qualifier
- WC = Wild card
- LL = Lucky loser
- Alt = Alternate
- ITF = ITF entry
- PR = Protected ranking
- SR = Special ranking
- SE = Special exempt
- JE = Junior exempt
- JR = Junior Accelerator Programme entrant
- CO = College Accelerator Programme entrant
- NG = Next Gen Accelerator Program entrant
- w/o = Walkover
- r = Retired
- d = Defaulted

First round
1	(Germany) Jana Kandarr (United States) Samantha Reeves
Bye
(Italy) Flavia Pennetta (Italy) Roberta Vinci	8
(Puerto Rico) Kristina Brandi (Venezuela) María Vento	4
(Paraguay) Larissa Schaerer (Spain) Magüi Serna	8
(United States) Jill Craybas (Luxembourg) Anne Kremer	5
Bye
2	(France) Nathalie Dechy (Russia) Nadia Petrova

Second round
1	(Germany) Jana Kandarr (United States) Samantha Reeves	8
(Italy) Flavia Pennetta (Italy) Roberta Vinci	9
(Paraguay) Larissa Schaerer (Spain) Magüi Serna	8
2	(France) Nathalie Dechy (Russia) Nadia Petrova	5

Qualifying competition
(Italy) Flavia Pennetta (Italy) Roberta Vinci	6
(Paraguay) Larissa Schaerer (Spain) Magüi Serna	8
