= 2003 State Farm Women's Tennis Classic – Singles =

Tennis tournament

Singles
- 2003 State Farm Women's Tennis Classic

Final
- Champion: (Japan) Ai Sugiyama
- Runner-up: (Belgium) Kim Clijsters
- Score: 3–6, 7–5, 6–4

Details
- Draw: 28
- Seeds: 8

Events
Singles	Doubles
- State Farm Women's Tennis Classic

Serena Williams was the defending champion, but was forced to withdraw due to a left knee tendonitis.

Ai Sugiyama won the title by defeating Kim Clijsters 3–6, 7–5, 6–4 in the final.

== Seeds ==
The first four seeds received a bye into the second round.

1. (United States) ~~Serena Williams~~ (withdrew due to a left knee tendonitis)
2. (Belgium) Kim Clijsters (final)
3. (United States) Lindsay Davenport (second round)
4. (Federal Republic of Yugoslavia) Jelena Dokic (second round)
5. (United States) Chanda Rubin (second round)
6. (Greece) Eleni Daniilidou (quarterfinals)
7. (Russia) Elena Bovina (first round)
8. (France) Nathalie Dechy (quarterfinals)

== Draw ==
Key

- Q = Qualifier
- WC = Wild card
- LL = Lucky loser
- Alt = Alternate
- ITF = ITF entry
- PR = Protected ranking
- SR = Special ranking
- SE = Special exempt
- JE = Junior exempt
- JR = Junior Accelerator Programme entrant
- CO = College Accelerator Programme entrant
- NG = Next Gen Accelerator Program entrant
- w/o = Walkover
- r = Retired
- d = Defaulted

=== Finals ===
Semifinals
(United States) Alexandra Stevenson	7^{7}	2	6^{7}
(Japan) Ai Sugiyama	6^{2}	6	7^{9}
(United States) Meghann Shaughnessy	3	5
2	(Belgium) Kim Clijsters	6	7

Finals
(Japan) Ai Sugiyama	3	7	6
2	(Belgium) Kim Clijsters	6	5	4

=== Top half ===
First round
Q	(United States) M Irvin	5	1
(United States) A Stevenson	7	6
Q	(France) V Razzano	6	7^{9}
(United States) L Raymond	2	6^{7}
WC	(Croatia) M Lučić	6	1	0
8	(France) N Dechy	3	6	6
Q	(Russia) E Kulikovskaya	3	1
(Japan) A Sugiyama	6	6
Q	(Italy) An Serra Zanetti	2	4
(South Korea) Y-j Cho	6	6
(Russia) V Zvonareva	2	3
6	(Greece) E Daniilidou	6	6

Second round
LL	(France) S Foretz	3	0
(United States) A Stevenson	6	6
Q	(France) V Razzano	4	r
8	(France) N Dechy	6
3	(United States) L Davenport	6^{5}	6	3
(Japan) A Sugiyama	7^{7}	4	6
(South Korea) Y-j Cho	3	3
6	(Greece) E Daniilidou	6	6

Quarterfinals
(United States) A Stevenson	6	6
8	(France) N Dechy	3	4
(Japan) A Sugiyama	7	7
6	(Greece) E Daniilidou	5	5

Semifinals
(United States) A Stevenson	7^{7}	2	6^{7}
(Japan) A Sugiyama	6^{2}	6	7^{9}

=== Bottom half ===
First round
7	(Russia) E Bovina	1	4
(Italy) F Schiavone	6	6
(Italy) S Farina Elia	7	3	6
(Slovakia) J Husárová	5	6	4
(United States) M Shaughnessy	6	6
(Czech Republic) D Bedáňová	2	3
5	(United States) C Rubin	6	6
(United States) J Craybas	3	1
(Austria) B Schett	6^{6}	1
(United States) L Granville	7^{8}	6
(Zimbabwe) C Black	6	7^{9}
(Russia) T Panova	0	6^{7}

Second round
(Italy) F Schiavone	1	7	6
(Italy) S Farina Elia	6	5	3
(United States) M Shaughnessy	6	6
4	(Federal Republic of Yugoslavia) J Dokic	4	2
5	(United States) C Rubin	6	2	1
(United States) L Granville	4	6	6
(Zimbabwe) C Black	2	3
2	(Belgium) K Clijsters	6	6

Quarterfinals
(Italy) F Schiavone	2	1
(United States) M Shaughnessy	6	6
(United States) L Granville	3	3
2	(Belgium) K Clijsters	6	6

Semifinals
(United States) M Shaughnessy	3	5
2	(Belgium) K Clijsters	6	7
