= 2003 State Farm Women's Tennis Classic – Doubles =

Tennis tournament

Doubles
- 2003 State Farm Women's Tennis Classic

Final
- Champions: (Belgium) Kim Clijsters (Japan) Ai Sugiyama
- Runners-up: (United States) Lindsay Davenport (United States) Lisa Raymond
- Score: 6–1, 6–4

Details
- Draw: 16
- Seeds: 4

Events
Singles	Doubles
- State Farm Women's Tennis Classic

Lisa Raymond and Rennae Stubbs were the defending champions, but competed this year with different partners.

Stubbs teamed up with Meghann Shaughnessy and lost in semifinals to Lindsay Davenport and Lisa Raymond.

Raymond teamed up with Lindsay Davenport and lost in the final to champions Kim Clijsters and Ai Sugiyama. The score was 6–1, 6–4.

== Seeds ==
1. (United States) Meghann Shaughnessy / (Australia) Rennae Stubbs (semifinals)
2. (Belgium) Kim Clijsters / (Japan) Ai Sugiyama (champions)
3. (Zimbabwe) Cara Black / (South Africa) Liezel Huber (first round)
4. (Slovakia) Janette Husárová / (Austria) Barbara Schett (first round)

== Draw ==
Key

- Q = Qualifier
- WC = Wild card
- LL = Lucky loser
- Alt = Alternate
- ITF = ITF entry
- PR = Protected ranking
- SR = Special ranking
- SE = Special exempt
- JE = Junior exempt
- JR = Junior Accelerator Programme entrant
- CO = College Accelerator Programme entrant
- NG = Next Gen Accelerator Program entrant
- w/o = Walkover
- r = Retired
- d = Defaulted

=== Draw ===
First round
1	(United States) M Shaughnessy (Australia) R Stubbs	6	6
WC	(Russia) T Panova (Russia) V Zvonareva	1	2
Q	(United States) J Craybas (Hungary) A Kapros	0	4
Alt	(United States) J Embry (Ukraine) T Perebiynis	6	6
3	(Zimbabwe) C Black (United States) L Huber	2	2
(United States) L Davenport (United States) L Raymond	6	6
Alt	(Italy) S Farina Elia (Italy) An Serra Zanetti	3	6	6
(Greece) E Daniilidou (Netherlands) C Vis	6	0	4
(Czech Republic) D Bedáňová (Federal Republic of Yugoslavia) J Dokic	0	2
(France) M Bartoli (France) S Cohen-Aloro	6	6
(Russia) A Jidkova (Russia) E Kulikovskaya	6	6
4	(Slovakia) J Husárová (Austria) B Schett	2	4
(France) S Foretz (France) V Razzano	4	4
(United States) M Irvin (United States) A Stevenson	6	6
(South Africa) N de Villiers (South Africa) J Steck	2	0
2	(Belgium) K Clijsters (Japan) A Sugiyama	6	6

Quarterfinals
1	(United States) M Shaughnessy (Australia) R Stubbs	6	6
Alt	(United States) J Embry (Ukraine) T Perebiynis	4	3
(United States) L Davenport (United States) L Raymond	6	6
Alt	(Italy) S Farina Elia (Italy) An Serra Zanetti	2	3
(France) M Bartoli (France) S Cohen-Aloro	6	6
(Russia) A Jidkova (Russia) E Kulikovskaya	4	2
(United States) M Irvin (United States) A Stevenson	0	3
2	(Belgium) K Clijsters (Japan) A Sugiyama	6	6

Semifinals
1	(United States) M Shaughnessy (Australia) R Stubbs	5	2
(United States) L Davenport (United States) L Raymond	7	6
(France) M Bartoli (France) S Cohen-Aloro	5	0
2	(Belgium) K Clijsters (Japan) A Sugiyama	7	6

Final
(United States) L Davenport (United States) L Raymond	1	4
2	(Belgium) K Clijsters (Japan) A Sugiyama	6	6
