= 1999 Thalgo Australian Women's Hardcourts – Singles =

Singles
- 1999 Thalgo Australian Women's Hardcourts

Final
- Champion: (Switzerland) Patty Schnyder
- Runner-up: (France) Mary Pierce
- Score: 4–6, 7–6^{(7–5)}, 6–2

Details
- Draw: 30
- Seeds: 8

Events
Singles	Doubles
- Thalgo Australian Women's Hardcourts

The 1999 Thalgo Australian Women's Hardcourts singles was the singles event of the third edition of the Thalgo Australian Women's Hardcourts; a WTA Tier III tournament held in the Gold Coast. Ai Sugiyama was the defending champion but lost in the semifinals to Patty Schnyder.

Schnyder won in the final 4–6, 7–6^{(7–5)}, 6–2 against Mary Pierce.

== Seeds ==
The top two seeds received a bye to the second round.

1. (France) Mary Pierce (final)
2. (Switzerland) Patty Schnyder (champion)
3. (Romania) Irina Spîrlea (semifinals)
4. (Japan) Ai Sugiyama (semifinals)
5. (Germany) Anke Huber (quarterfinals)
6. (Spain) Magüi Serna (quarterfinals)
7. (Russia) Elena Likhovtseva (second round)
8. (Slovakia) Henrieta Nagyová (first round)

== Draw ==
Key

- Q = Qualifier
- WC = Wild card
- LL = Lucky loser
- Alt = Alternate
- ITF = ITF entry
- PR = Protected ranking
- SR = Special ranking
- SE = Special exempt
- JE = Junior exempt
- JR = Junior Accelerator Programme entrant
- CO = College Accelerator Programme entrant
- NG = Next Gen Accelerator Program entrant
- w/o = Walkover
- r = Retired
- d = Defaulted

=== Finals ===
Semifinals
1	(France) Mary Pierce	4	6	6
3	(Romania) Irina Spîrlea	6	4	1
4	(Japan) Ai Sugiyama	0	6	4
2	(Switzerland) Patty Schnyder	6	1	6

Final
1	(France) Mary Pierce	6	6^{5}	2
2	(Switzerland) Patty Schnyder	4	7^{7}	6

=== Top half ===
First round
Q	(Argentina) I Gorrochategui	7	6
(Italy) T Garbin	5	2
(Russia) T Panova	1	6	2
(France) N Dechy	6	2	6
WC	(Australia) N Pratt	2	1
7	(Russia) E Likhovtseva	6	6
3	(Romania) I Spîrlea	7^{7}	6
Q	(Australia) R McQuillan	6^{2}	3
(Latvia) L Neiland	0	3
(Israel) A Smashnova	6	6
(France) A-G Sidot	3	6	6
Q	(Australia) A Ellwood	6	4	1
(South Africa) M de Swardt	3	2
5	(Germany) A Huber	6	6

Second round
1	(France) M Pierce	6	6
Q	(Argentina) I Gorrochategui	2	2
(France) N Dechy	6	3	7
7	(Russia) E Likhovtseva	4	6	5
3	(Romania) I Spîrlea	6	6
(Israel) A Smashnova	4	1
(France) A-G Sidot	3	6	5
5	(Germany) A Huber	6	4	7

Quarterfinals
1	(France) M Pierce	6	6
(France) N Dechy	4	3
3	(Romania) I Spîrlea	6	4	6
5	(Germany) A Huber	4	6	1

Semifinals
1	(France) M Pierce	4	6	6
3	(Romania) I Spîrlea	6	4	1

=== Bottom half ===
First round
8	(Slovakia) H Nagyová	6	6^{2}	1
(Czech Republic) K Hrdličková	3	7^{7}	6
Q	(Belgium) L Courtois	2	4
LL	(United States) B Rippner	6	6
WC	(Australia) A Molik	3	2
(France) S Pitkowski	6	6
(United States) C Morariu	2	7^{8}	3
4	(Japan) A Sugiyama	6	6^{6}	6
6	(Spain) M Serna	6	3	6
(Belgium) S Appelmans	2	6	3
(Romania) R Dragomir	6	6
(Ukraine) E Tatarkova	1	3
(Chinese Taipei) S-t Wang	6	7^{7}
(Austria) S Plischke	4	6^{2}

Second round
(Czech Republic) K Hrdličková	2	1
LL	(United States) B Rippner	6	6
(France) S Pitkowski	4	5
4	(Japan) A Sugiyama	6	7
6	(Spain) M Serna	6	6
(Romania) R Dragomir	3	4
(Chinese Taipei) S-t Wang	3	4
2	(Switzerland) P Schnyder	6	6

Quarterfinals
LL	(United States) B Rippner	3	3
4	(Japan) A Sugiyama	6	6
6	(Spain) M Serna	0	6	4
2	(Switzerland) P Schnyder	6	1	6

Semifinals
4	(Japan) A Sugiyama	0	6	4
2	(Switzerland) P Schnyder	6	1	6

== Qualifying ==
=== Seeds ===
1. (Argentina) Mariana Díaz Oliva (second round)
2. (Spain) Cristina Torrens Valero (second round)
3. (United States) Brie Rippner (qualifying competition, lucky loser)
4. (Canada) Sonya Jeyaseelan (first round)
5. (United States) Samantha Reeves (first round)
6. (Hungary) Rita Kuti-Kis (second round)
7. (Japan) Nana Miyagi (second round)
8. (Belgium) Laurence Courtois (qualifier)

=== Qualifiers ===
1. (Australia) Rachel McQuillan
2. (Belgium) Laurence Courtois
3. (Argentina) Inés Gorrochategui
4. (Australia) Annabel Ellwood

==== Lucky losers ====
1. (United States) Brie Rippner

== Qualifying draw ==
Key

- Q = Qualifier
- WC = Wild card
- LL = Lucky loser
- Alt = Alternate
- ITF = ITF entry
- PR = Protected ranking
- SR = Special ranking
- SE = Special exempt
- JE = Junior exempt
- JR = Junior Accelerator Programme entrant
- CO = College Accelerator Programme entrant
- NG = Next Gen Accelerator Program entrant
- w/o = Walkover
- r = Retired
- d = Defaulted

=== First qualifier ===
First round
1	(Argentina) Mariana Díaz Oliva	6	6
(Japan) Rika Hiraki	4	4
(Austria) Patricia Wartusch	4	6	6
WC	(Australia) Evie Dominikovic	6	3	1
(Australia) Cindy Watson	5	3
(Australia) Rachel McQuillan	7	6
(Poland) Aleksandra Olsza	6	6
5	(United States) Samantha Reeves	4	2

Second round
1	(Argentina) Mariana Díaz Oliva	2	0
(Austria) Patricia Wartusch	6	6
(Australia) Rachel McQuillan	6	6
(Poland) Aleksandra Olsza	4	3

Qualifying competition
(Austria) Patricia Wartusch	3	1
(Australia) Rachel McQuillan	6	6

=== Second qualifier ===
First round
4	(Canada) Sonya Jeyaseelan	6^{5}	4
(United States) Mashona Washington	7^{7}	6
(Canada) Maureen Drake	6	6
(Germany) Christina Singer	3	1
(Australia) Amanda Grahame	6^{4}	7	4
(South Africa) Liezel Horn	7^{7}	5	6
(Slovakia) Janette Husárová	3	3
8	(Belgium) Laurence Courtois	6	6

Second round
(United States) Mashona Washington	3	3
(Canada) Maureen Drake	6	6
(South Africa) Liezel Horn	6	2	3
8	(Belgium) Laurence Courtois	4	6	6

Qualifying competition
(Canada) Maureen Drake	4	5
8	(Belgium) Laurence Courtois	6	7

=== Third qualifier ===
First round
6	(Hungary) Rita Kuti-Kis	6	6
WC	(Australia) Bryanne Stewart	3	1
(Australia) Trudi Musgrave	3	1
(Argentina) Inés Gorrochategui	6	6
(United States) Alexandra Stevenson	6	6
(United States) Erika deLone	3	2
(India) Nirupama Vaidyanathan	5	4
3	(United States) Brie Rippner	7	6

Second round
6	(Hungary) Rita Kuti-Kis	4	2
(Argentina) Inés Gorrochategui	6	6
(United States) Alexandra Stevenson	5	2
3	(United States) Brie Rippner	7	6

Qualifying competition
(Argentina) Inés Gorrochategui	6	4	6
3	(United States) Brie Rippner	4	6	3

=== Fourth qualifier ===
First round
7	(Japan) Nana Miyagi	4	6	7^{7}
WC	(Australia) Lisa McShea	6	3	6^{4}
(France) Laurence Andretto	2	3
(Australia) Kerry-Anne Guse	6	6
(Australia) Annabel Ellwood	6	5	7
(Italy) Francesca Lubiani	2	7	5
(Australia) Catherine Barclay	1	6^{3}
2	(Spain) Cristina Torrens Valero	6	7^{7}

Second round
7	(Japan) Nana Miyagi	3	4
(Australia) Kerry-Anne Guse	6	6
(Australia) Annabel Ellwood	0	7^{7}	7
2	(Spain) Cristina Torrens Valero	6	6^{2}	5

Qualifying competition
(Australia) Kerry-Anne Guse	6	3	0
(Australia) Annabel Ellwood	1	6	6
