= 1999 Italian Open – Men's doubles =

Men's doubles
- 1999 Italian Open

Final
- Champions: (South Africa) Ellis Ferreira (United States) Rick Leach
- Runners-up: (South Africa) David Adams (South Africa) John-Laffnie de Jager
- Score: 6–7, 6–1, 6–2

Events
| Singles | men | women |
| Doubles | men | women |
| ← 1998 · | Italian Open | · 2000 → |

The 1999 Italian Open was a tennis tournament played on outdoor clay courts. It was the 56th edition of the Italian Open, and was part of the ATP Super 9 of the 1999 ATP Tour, and of the Tier I Series of the 1999 WTA Tour. Both the men's and the women's events took place at the Foro Italico in Rome, Italy.

== Seeds ==
Champion seeds are indicated in bold text while text in italics indicates the round in which those seeds were eliminated.

1. (The Bahamas) Mark Knowles / (Canada) Daniel Nestor (quarterfinals)
2. (Zimbabwe) Wayne Black / (Australia) Sandon Stolle (first round)
3. (Sweden) Jonas Björkman / (Australia) Patrick Rafter (quarterfinals)
4. (South Africa) **Ellis Ferreira** / (United States) **Rick Leach (champions)**
5. (France) Olivier Delaître / (France) Fabrice Santoro (semifinals)
6. (Czech Republic) Jiří Novák / (Czech Republic) David Rikl (first round)
7. (United States) Donald Johnson / (Czech Republic) Cyril Suk (semifinals)
8. (South Africa) David Adams / (South Africa) John-Laffnie de Jager (final)

== Draw ==
=== Key ===
- Q = Qualifier
- WC = Wild card
- LL = Lucky loser
- Alt = Alternate
- ITF = ITF entry
- PR = Protected ranking
- SR = Special ranking
- SE = Special exempt
- JE = Junior exempt
- JR = Junior Accelerator Programme entrant
- CO = College Accelerator Programme entrant
- NG = Next Gen Accelerator Program entrant
- w/o = Walkover
- r = Retired
- d = Defaulted

=== Finals ===
Semifinals
7 | (United States) Donald Johnson (Czech Republic) Cyril Suk | 3 | 5
4 | (South Africa) **Ellis Ferreira** **(United States) Rick Leach** | **6** | **7**
5 | (France) Olivier Delaître (France) Fabrice Santoro | 1 | 5
8 | (South Africa) **David Adams** **(South Africa) John-Laffnie de Jager** | **6** | **7**

Final
4 | (South Africa) **Ellis Ferreira** **(United States) Rick Leach** | 6 | **6** | **6**
8 | (South Africa) David Adams (South Africa) John-Laffnie de Jager | **7** | 1 | 2

=== Top half ===
First round
1 | (The Bahamas) **M Knowles** **(Canada) D Nestor** | **6** | **6**
(South Africa) P Norval (Zimbabwe) K Ullyett | 3 | 4
(Argentina) **L Lobo** **(Spain) F Roig** | **7** | 5 | **6**
(Russia) Y Kafelnikov (Spain) J Sánchez | 5 | **7** | 4
(United States) **R Reneberg** **(United States) J Stark** | **6** | **6**
(United States) M Keil (Brazil) F Meligeni | 2 | 2
7 | (United States) **D Johnson** **(Czech Republic) C Suk** | **6** | **6**
(Australia) A Kratzmann (United States) F Montana | 3 | 4
4 | (South Africa) **E Ferreira** **(United States) R Leach** | 5 | **6** | **7**
(South Africa) L Bale (South Africa) G Stafford | **7** | 3 | 6
(United Kingdom) **N Broad** **(South Africa) R Koenig** | **6** | **7**
(Czech Republic) M Damm (Czech Republic) P Vízner | 3 | 6
(Sweden) **P Nyborg** **(Australia) P Tramacchi** | **7** | 6 | **6**
(Argentina) D Orsanic (Argentina) M Puerta | 5 | **7** | 4
(South Africa) **W Ferreira** **(United States) J Tarango** | **6** | **7**
6 | (Czech Republic) J Novák (Czech Republic) D Rikl | 3 | 5

Second round
1 | (The Bahamas) **M Knowles** **(Canada) D Nestor** | **6** | **6**
(Argentina) L Lobo (Spain) F Roig | 0 | 0
(United States) R Reneberg (United States) J Stark | 3 | 5
7 | (United States) **D Johnson** **(Czech Republic) C Suk** | **6** | **7**
4 | (South Africa) **E Ferreira** **(United States) R Leach** | **6** | **6**
(United Kingdom) N Broad (South Africa) R Koenig | 3 | 2
(Sweden) P Nyborg (Australia) P Tramacchi | **6** | 2 | 1
(South Africa) **W Ferreira** **(United States) J Tarango** | 1 | **6** | **6**

Quarterfinals
1 | (The Bahamas) M Knowles (Canada) D Nestor | 4 | 3
7 | (United States) **D Johnson** **(Czech Republic) C Suk** | **6** | **6**
4 | (South Africa) **E Ferreira** **(United States) R Leach** | **6** | **7**
(South Africa) W Ferreira (United States) J Tarango | 3 | 6

Semifinals
7 | (United States) D Johnson (Czech Republic) C Suk | 3 | 5
4 | (South Africa) **E Ferreira** **(United States) R Leach** | **6** | **7**

=== Bottom half ===
First round
5 | (France) **O Delaître** **(France) F Santoro** | **6** | **6**
(Brazil) G Kuerten (Ecuador) N Lapentti | 4 | 2
(Sweden) **T Enqvist** **(Sweden) T Johansson** | **6** | **6**
(Germany) N Kiefer (Italy) D Sanguinetti | 3 | 2
(United States) **A O'Brien** **(United States) J Palmer** | **6** | 5 | **6**
(Morocco) H Arazi (Italy) M Navarra | 3 | **7** | 0
3 | (Sweden) **J Björkman** **(Australia) P Rafter** | **6** | 6 | **6**
(United States) J Grabb (Australia) D Macpherson | 4 | **7** | 4
8 | (South Africa) **D Adams** **(South Africa) J-L de Jager** | **6** | **7**
(India) M Bhupathi (United Kingdom) T Henman | 3 | 6
(South Africa) **C Haggard** **(Russia) A Olhovskiy** | **7** | **6**
(Croatia) G Ivanišević (Italy) V Santopadre | 5 | 1
(Australia) **A Florent** **(Czech Republic) D Vacek** | **7** | **6**
(Argentina) P Albano (Spain) T Carbonell | 5 | 3
(Italy) **M Bertolini** **(Italy) C Brandi** | **6** | **6**
2 | (Zimbabwe) W Black (Australia) S Stolle | 3 | 1

Second round
5 | (France) **O Delaître** **(France) F Santoro** | **6** | 3 | **7**
(Sweden) T Enqvist (Sweden) T Johansson | 2 | **6** | 5
(United States) A O'Brien (United States) J Palmer | **6** | 3 | 3
3 | (Sweden) **J Björkman** **(Australia) P Rafter** | 4 | **6** | **6**
8 | (South Africa) **D Adams** **(South Africa) J-L de Jager** | **6** | **7**
(South Africa) C Haggard (Russia) A Olhovskiy | 1 | 5
(Australia) A Florent (Czech Republic) D Vacek | 4 | 4
(Italy) **M Bertolini** **(Italy) C Brandi** | **6** | **6**

Quarterfinals
5 | (France) **O Delaître** **(France) F Santoro** | **6** | **6**
3 | (Sweden) J Björkman (Australia) P Rafter | 0 | 4
8 | (South Africa) **D Adams** **(South Africa) J-L de Jager** | **6** | **7**
(Italy) M Bertolini (Italy) C Brandi | 4 | 5

Semifinals
5 | (France) O Delaître (France) F Santoro | 1 | 5
8 | (South Africa) **D Adams** **(South Africa) J-L de Jager** | **6** | **7**
