= 1999 Thalgo Australian Women's Hardcourts =

Coordinates: 27.8721°S 153.3504°E

- Date: 3–9 January
- Edition: 3rd
- Category: Tier III
- Draw: 30S / 16D
- Prize money: $180,000
- Surface: Hard / outdoor
- Location: Hope Island, Queensland, Australia
- Venue: Hope Island Resort Tennis Centre

Champions

Singles
- (Switzerland) Patty Schnyder

Doubles
- (United States) Corina Morariu / (Latvia) Larisa Neiland
| ← 1998 · | Australian Hard Court Championships | · 2000 → |

The 1999 Thalgo Australian Women's Hardcourts was a women's tennis tournament played on outdoor hard courts at the Hope Island Resort Tennis Centre in Hope Island, Queensland in Australia that was part of the Tier III category of the 1999 WTA Tour. It was the third edition of the tournament and was held from 3 January through 9 January 1999. Second-seeded Patty Schnyder won the singles title and earned $27,000 first-prize money.

== Finals ==
=== Singles ===
(Switzerland) Patty Schnyder defeated (France) Mary Pierce, 4–6, 7–6^{(7–5)}, 6–2

- It was Schnyder's 1st title of the year and the 8th of her career.

=== Doubles ===
(United States) Corina Morariu / (Latvia) Larisa Neiland defeated (Australia) Kristine Kunce / (Romania) Irina Spîrlea, 6–3, 6–3

== Entrants ==
=== Seeds ===
| Country | Player | Rank | Seed |
|---|---|---|---|
| FRA | Mary Pierce | 7 | 1 |
| SUI | Patty Schnyder | 11 | 2 |
| ROU | Irina Spîrlea | 15 | 3 |
| JPN | Ai Sugiyama | 18 | 4 |
| GER | Anke Huber | 21 | 5 |
| ESP | Magüi Serna | 24 | 6 |
| RUS | Elena Likhovtseva | 26 | 7 |
| SVK | Henrieta Nagyová | 28 | 8 |

=== Other entrants ===
The following players received wildcards into the singles main draw:

- (Australia) Nicole Pratt
- (Australia) Alicia Molik

The following players received wildcards into the doubles main draw:

- (Australia) Annabel Ellwood / (Australia) Alicia Molik

The following players received entry from the singles qualifying draw:

- (Argentina) Inés Gorrochategui
- (Australia) Rachel McQuillan
- (Australia) Annabel Ellwood
- (Belgium) Laurence Courtois

The following players received the lucky loser spots:

- (United States) Brie Rippner

The following players received entry from the doubles qualifying draw:

- (Australia) Evie Dominikovic / (Australia) Cindy Watson
