= 1999 Italian Open – Men's singles =

Men's singles
- 1999 Italian Open

Final
- Champion: (Brazil) Gustavo Kuerten
- Runner-up: (Australia) Patrick Rafter
- Score: 6–4, 7–5, 7–6^{(8–6)}

Details
- Draw: 64
- Seeds: 16

Events
Singles	men	women
Doubles	men	women
← 1998 ·	Italian Open	· 2000 →

Gustavo Kuerten defeated Patrick Rafter in the final, 6–4, 7–5, 7–6^{(8–6)} to win the men's singles tennis title at the 1999 Italian Open.

Marcelo Ríos was the defending champion, but lost in the first round to David Prinosil.

== Seeds ==
1. (Russia) Yevgeny Kafelnikov (third round)
2. (United States) Pete Sampras (second round)
3. (Spain) Álex Corretja (semifinals)
4. (Australia) Patrick Rafter (final)
5. (Netherlands) Richard Krajicek (second round)
6. (Spain) Carlos Moyà (third round)
7. (United Kingdom) Tim Henman (third round)
8. (Chile) Marcelo Ríos (first round)
9. (Australia) Mark Philippoussis (first round)
10. (Slovakia) Karol Kučera (quarterfinals)
11. (United States) ~~Todd Martin~~ (withdrew)
12. (United Kingdom) Greg Rusedski (second round)
13. (Spain) Álbert Costa (first round)
14. (United States) Andre Agassi (third round)
15. (Spain) Félix Mantilla (semifinals)
16. (Brazil) Gustavo Kuerten (champion)

== Draw ==
=== Key ===
- Q = Qualifier
- WC = Wild card
- LL = Lucky loser
- Alt = Alternate
- SE = Special exempt
- PR = Protected ranking
- ITF = ITF entry
- JE = Junior exempt
- w/o = Walkover
- r = Retired
- d = Defaulted
- SR = Special ranking

=== Finals ===
Semifinals
16	(Brazil) Gustavo Kuerten	6	6
3	(Spain) Álex Corretja	4	2
4	(Australia) Patrick Rafter	6	7
15	(Spain) Félix Mantilla	3	5

Final
16	(Brazil) Gustavo Kuerten	6	7	7^{8}
4	(Australia) Patrick Rafter	4	5	6^{6}

=== Top half ===
==== Section 1 ====
First round
1	(Russia) Y Kafelnikov	7^{7}	5	6
(United States) C Woodruff	6^{1}	7	4
Q	(Romania) A Voinea	2	1
(Russia) M Safin	6	6
(Morocco) Y El Aynaoui	3	6	4
(Spain) F Clavet	6	2	6
(Spain) F Vicente	4	3
16	(Brazil) G Kuerten	6	6
10	(Slovakia) K Kučera	6	6
(Paraguay) R Delgado	3	2
(Austria) T Muster	6^{5}	7^{7}	4
(United States) M Chang	7^{7}	6^{4}	6
(Netherlands) J Siemerink	6	7
(Australia) A Ilie	3	5
(Czech Republic) D Vacek	5	3
7	(United Kingdom) T Henman	7	6

Second round
1	(Russia) Y Kafelnikov	6	6
(Russia) M Safin	1	2
(Spain) F Clavet	3	3
16	(Brazil) G Kuerten	6	6
10	(Slovakia) K Kučera	7	6
(United States) M Chang	5	3
(Netherlands) J Siemerink	5	5
7	(United Kingdom) T Henman	7	7

Third round
1	(Russia) Y Kafelnikov	5	1
16	(Brazil) G Kuerten	7	6
10	(Slovakia) K Kučera	4	7^{7}	6
7	(United Kingdom) T Henman	6	6^{5}	3

Quarterfinals
16	(Brazil) G Kuerten	3	6	7
10	(Slovakia) K Kučera	6	4	5

==== Section 2 ====
First round
3	(Spain) Á Corretja	6	7^{7}
WC	(Italy) D Nargiso	1	6^{2}
Q	(Australia) R Fromberg	6	1	4
(Morocco) H Arazi	1	6	6
(France) S Grosjean	6^{2}	6^{3}
(France) F Santoro	7^{7}	7^{7}
(South Africa) W Ferreira	3	6	7^{7}
13	(Spain) Á Costa	6	2	6^{4}
LL	(Argentina) F Squillari	6	6
Q	(Italy) M Meneschincheri	0	3
(Italy) D Sanguinetti	1	6	6
WC	(Italy) V Santopadre	6	2	3
(Switzerland) M Rosset	0	0	r
Q	(France) A Clément	6	1
WC	(Italy) R Furlan	2	4
6	(Spain) C Moyà	6	6

Second round
3	(Spain) Á Corretja	6	6
(Morocco) H Arazi	3	3
(France) F Santoro	4	6	6
(South Africa) W Ferreira	6	3	3
LL	(Argentina) F Squillari	6^{4}	7^{7}	6
(Italy) D Sanguinetti	7^{7}	6^{4}	3
Q	(France) A Clément	2	1
6	(Spain) C Moyà	6	6

Third round
3	(Spain) Á Corretja	7^{7}	1	6
(France) F Santoro	6^{1}	6	1
LL	(Argentina) F Squillari	6	7
6	(Spain) C Moyà	3	5

Quarterfinals
3	(Spain) Á Corretja	5	7^{7}	7
LL	(Argentina) F Squillari	7	6^{4}	5

=== Bottom half ===
==== Section 3 ====
First round
5	(Netherlands) R Krajicek	6	3	6
(United States) J-M Gambill	0	6	1
(Germany) N Kiefer	7	6
(Sweden) T Enqvist	5	4
Q	(Spain) A Portas	7^{7}	4	2
(Ecuador) N Lapentti	6^{5}	6	6
(Australia) S Draper	6^{4}	6^{3}
12	(United Kingdom) G Rusedski	7^{7}	7^{7}
14	(United States) A Agassi	6	6
(France) J Golmard	3	4
LL	(Netherlands) J van Lottum	6	4	5
(Spain) A Berasategui	4	6	7
(Argentina) M Puerta	1	4
Q	(Argentina) G Gaudio	6	6
(Croatia) G Ivanišević	5	0
4	(Australia) P Rafter	7	6

Second round
5	(Netherlands) R Krajicek	3	2
(Germany) N Kiefer	6	6
(Ecuador) N Lapentti	6	6
12	(United Kingdom) G Rusedski	3	3
14	(United States) A Agassi	6	6
(Spain) A Berasategui	1	2
Q	(Argentina) G Gaudio	2	3
4	(Australia) P Rafter	6	6

Third round
(Germany) N Kiefer	6	6^{3}	3
(Ecuador) N Lapentti	3	7^{7}	6
14	(United States) A Agassi	1	6^{4}
4	(Australia) P Rafter	6	7^{7}

Quarterfinals
(Ecuador) N Lapentti	6	5	1
4	(Australia) P Rafter	4	7	6

==== Section 4 ====
First round
8	(Chile) M Ríos	2	7	3
Q	(Germany) D Prinosil	6	5	6
(Australia) J Stoltenberg	4	6	6
(Sweden) J Björkman	6	4	4
(Sweden) T Johansson	1	6	5
WC	(Italy) A Gaudenzi	6	4	7
(United States) V Spadea	7^{7}	4	6
9	(Australia) M Philippoussis	6^{2}	6	1
15	(Spain) F Mantilla	6
(Argentina) M Zabaleta	1	r
WC	(Italy) G Pozzi	0	1
(Slovakia) D Hrbatý	6	6
Q	(Brazil) F Meligeni	6	6
(France) C Pioline	1	2
(Czech Republic) B Ulihrach	6	2	6^{2}
2	(United States) P Sampras	3	6	7^{7}

Second round
Q	(Germany) D Prinosil	6	6
(Australia) J Stoltenberg	3	0
WC	(Italy) A Gaudenzi	1	6	6
(United States) V Spadea	6	2	3
15	(Spain) F Mantilla	6	4	7
(Slovakia) D Hrbatý	2	6	5
Q	(Brazil) F Meligeni	6	6
2	(United States) P Sampras	3	1

Third round
Q	(Germany) D Prinosil	7	6
WC	(Italy) A Gaudenzi	5	3
15	(Spain) F Mantilla	6	6
Q	(Brazil) F Meligeni	2	3

Quarterfinals
Q	(Germany) D Prinosil	2	4
15	(Spain) F Mantilla	6	6
