= 1998 Thalgo Australian Women's Hardcourts – Doubles =

Doubles
- 1998 Thalgo Australian Women's Hardcourts
- 1997 Champions: (Japan) Naoko Kijimuta (Japan) Nana Miyagi

Final
- Champions: (Russia) Elena Likhovtseva (Japan) Ai Sugiyama
- Runners-up: (South Korea) Sung-Hee Park (Chinese Taipei) Shi-Ting Wang
- Score: 1–6, 6–3, 6–4

Events
Singles	Doubles
← 1997 ·	Australian Hard Court Championships	· 1999 →

Naoko Kijimuta and Nana Miyagi were the defending champions but did not compete that year.

Elena Likhovtseva and Ai Sugiyama won in the final 1–6, 6–3, 6–4 against Sung-Hee Park and Shi-Ting Wang.

== Seeds ==
Champion seeds are indicated in bold text while text in italics indicates the round in which those seeds were eliminated.

1. n/a
2. (Russia) **Elena Likhovtseva** / (Japan) **Ai Sugiyama (champions)**
3. (Australia) Kerry-Anne Guse / (Australia) Rachel McQuillan (first round)
4. (Czech Republic) Eva Melicharová / (Czech Republic) Helena Vildová (first round)

== Draw ==
=== Key ===
- Q = Qualifier
- WC = Wild card
- LL = Lucky loser
- Alt = Alternate
- SE = Special exempt
- PR = Protected ranking
- ITF = ITF entry
- JE = Junior exempt
- w/o = Walkover
- r = Retired
- d = Defaulted
- SR = Special ranking

First round
LL	(Bulgaria) M Maleeva (France) S Pitkowski	2	2
(Poland) **A Olsza** (Ukraine) **E Tatarkova**	**6**	**6**
(South Korea) **S-H Park** (Chinese Taipei) **S-T Wang**	**7**	4	**6**
(Australia) K Kunce (United States) C Morariu	6	**6**	4
4	(Czech Republic) E Melicharová (Czech Republic) H Vildová	2	0
(Belarus) **O Barabanschikova** (Italy) **R Grande**	**6**	**6**
(Australia) C Barclay (Australia) L McShea	4	**6**	2
(Bulgaria) **S Krivencheva** (Australia) **L Pleming**	**6**	0	**6**
(South Africa) **L Horn** (Argentina) **P Suárez**	**6**	1	**6**
(Belgium) L Courtois (Germany) W Probst	1	**6**	3
(Chinese Taipei) **J Lee** (United States) **L Lee**	**6**	4	**6**
3	(Australia) K-A Guse (Australia) R McQuillan	1	**6**	3
(United States) **M McGrath** (Switzerland) **P Schnyder**	**6**	**6**
Q	(Argentina) M Díaz Oliva (Austria) S Plischke	4	4
WC	(Australia) G Biggs (Australia) A Jensen	2	2
2	(Russia) **E Likhovtseva** (Japan) **A Sugiyama**	**6**	**6**

Quarterfinals
(Poland) A Olsza (Ukraine) E Tatarkova	3	2
(South Korea) **S-H Park** (Chinese Taipei) **S-T Wang**	**6**	**6**
(Belarus) O Barabanschikova (Italy) R Grande	6	6
(Bulgaria) **S Krivencheva** (Australia) **L Pleming**	**7**	**7**
(South Africa) L Horn (Argentina) P Suárez	4	5
(Chinese Taipei) **J Lee** (United States) **L Lee**	**6**	**7**
(United States) M McGrath (Switzerland) P Schnyder	3	5
2	(Russia) **E Likhovtseva** (Japan) **A Sugiyama**	**6**	**7**

Semifinals
(South Korea) **S-H Park** (Chinese Taipei) **S-T Wang**	**6**	**6**
(Bulgaria) S Krivencheva (Australia) L Pleming	3	3
(Chinese Taipei) J Lee (United States) L Lee	**6**	3	4
2	(Russia) **E Likhovtseva** (Japan) **A Sugiyama**	3	**6**	**6**

Final
(South Korea) Sung-Hee Park (Chinese Taipei) Shi-Ting Wang	**6**	3	4
2	(Russia) **Elena Likhovtseva** (Japan) **Ai Sugiyama**	1	**6**	**6**
