= Hope Island Resort Tennis Centre =

Tennis venue in Queensland, Australia

Coordinates: 27.8717°S 153.3504°E

The Hope Island Resort Tennis Centre is a tennis venue located at the corner of Hope Island Road and Activa Way, Hope Island, Gold Coast, Queensland, Australia. It has hosted a number of international tennis tournaments.

When Brisbane's major tennis centre, Milton Courts, closed in 1990s due to financial losses, the Hope Island Resort Tennis Centre became increasingly used for major tennis events in Queensland. When the Queensland Government opened their new Queensland Tennis Centre at Tennyson in Brisbane in 2008, major events relocated to the new facility, while other events relocated to the Royal Pines tennis centre.

Pat Cash sold his interest in the centre in 2008 to Tennis Asia, a company based in Hong Kong, from 2008 the centre has been leased to a number of local lease holders. The association with Pat Cash was lost in 2010 when the lease holder Chris Steele decided not to renew the relationship. In 2012, Tennis Blue took over the lease followed by Australia Tennis Academy in 2014. In 2016, Activa Tennis Academy Australia took over the lease and are the current lease holder with Jeff Schneider as company director and head coach.

In April 2021, Gold Coast billionaire and former Member of Parliament, Clive Palmer, purchased the centre.

== Facilities ==
The venue has 12 international standard hardcourts with floodlighting.

== Tournaments ==
- 1997 Gold Coast Classic
- 1997 Fed Cup World Group play-offs
- 1998 Thalgo Australian Women's Hardcourts
- 1999 Thalgo Australian Women's Hardcourts
- 2001 Thalgo Australian Women's Hardcourts
- Australian Women's Hardcourts (1997–2008)

== See also ==
- Sports on the Gold Coast, Queensland
