= Jana Kandarr =

German tennis player

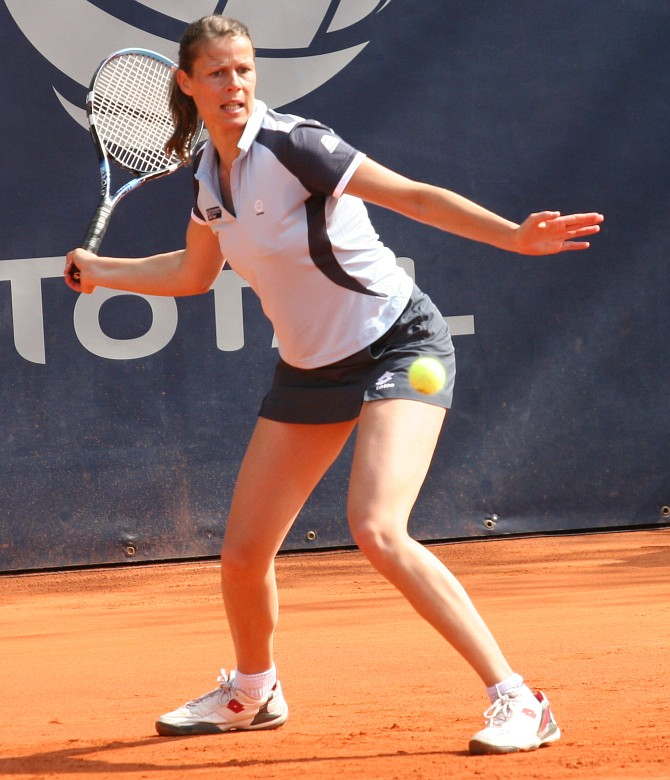
- Country (sports): Germany
- Residence: Munich, Germany
- Born: 21 September 1976 (age 48); Halle, East Germany
- Height: 1.81 m (5 ft 11 in)
- Turned pro: 1994
- Retired: 2005 (last match)
- Plays: Right (two-handed backhand)
- Prize money: $674,203

Singles
- Career record: 184–211
- Career titles: 0
- Highest ranking: No. 43 (11 June 2001)

Grand Slam singles results
- Australian Open: 4R (2000)
- French Open: 2R (1997, 2001, 2002)
- Wimbledon: 2R (1995, 2000, 2001, 2002)
- US Open: 2R (2000)

Other tournaments
- Olympic Games: 3R (2000)

Doubles
- Career record: 18–40
- Career titles: 0
- Highest ranking: No. 108 (7 February 2000)

Grand Slam doubles results
- Australian Open: 2R (2000)
- French Open: 1R (2000)

Jana Kandarr (born 21 September 1976) is a German former top 50 professional tennis player. Kandarr is notable for playing with her right hand, even though she is left-handed.

== Career ==
Kandarr moved with her parents from Halle to Karlsruhe after the German reunification. Her mother Petra Vogt is a former European athletics champion and was Sports Person of the Year in the German Democratic Republic (East Germany) in 1969. Jana Kandarr was practicing for some years in Unterhaching before she went professional in 1994.

The biggest success of her 10-year-long career was her participation in the Australian Open in 2000, where she made the round of 16, coming through qualifying and winning six three-set matches in a row, before being forced to retire against ninth seed Julie Halard-Decugis. Also in 2000, she reached the last 16 at the Sydney Olympics, losing to the second seed and eventual winner Venus Williams. By the end of the year, Kandarr was ranked as the No. 1 German player overall.

Her best performance at a WTA tournament was the semifinals of Palermo in 1996 and Estoril in 2001. She reached her highest ranking on 11 June 2001 - after a victory against world No. 5 Amélie Mauresmo in the first round of the French Open. After the tournament she was listed as world No. 43.

Kandarr ended her professional career in 2005 but is still playing competitive tennis occasionally in the Bundesliga for TC 1899 Blau-Weiss Berlin.

Having stopped school in 1996 to play tennis, she only graduated in 2000. From the winter semester of 2002/03, she has been studying geoscience and biology at the Humboldt University of Berlin, while living in Berlin-Kreuzberg. Her hobbies are horse riding, reading and going to the theater.
