= Ai Sugiyama =

Japanese tennis player (born 1975)

Ai Sugiyama 杉山愛
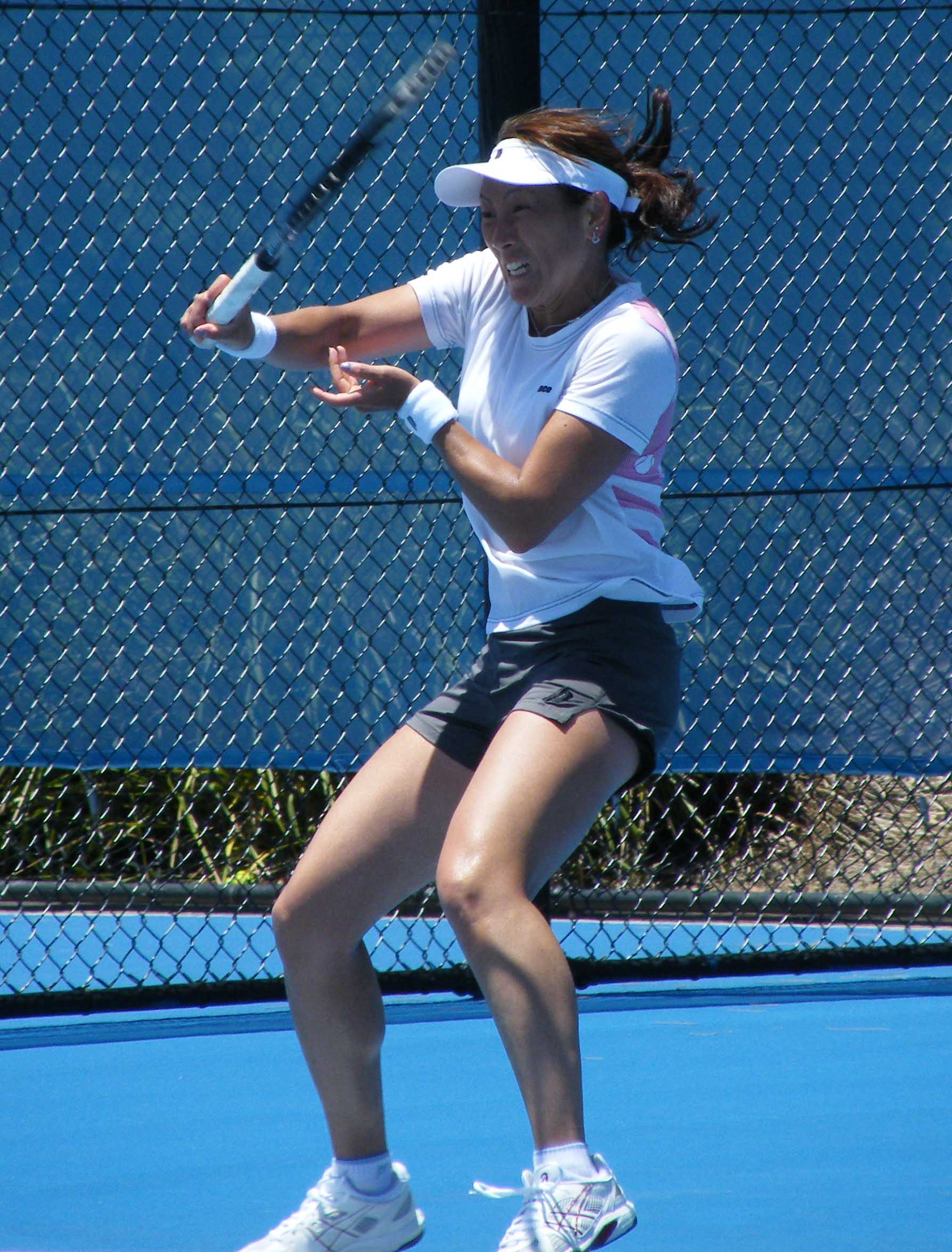
- Country (sports): Japan
- Born: 5 July 1975 (age 51) Yokohama
- Height: 1.63 m (5 ft 4 in)
- Turned pro: October 1992
- Retired: October 2009
- Plays: Right-handed (two-handed backhand)
- Prize money: $8,128,126

Singles
- Career record: 492–419
- Career titles: 6 WTA, 1 ITF
- Highest ranking: No. 8 (9 February 2004)

Grand Slam singles results
- Australian Open: QF (2000)
- French Open: 4R (1995, 2000, 2003)
- Wimbledon: QF (2004)
- US Open: 4R (2003, 2004)

Other tournaments
- Tour Finals: RR (2003)
- Olympic Games: QF (2004)

Doubles
- Career record: 566–295
- Career titles: 38 WTA, 4 ITF
- Highest ranking: No. 1 (23 October 2000)

Grand Slam doubles results
- Australian Open: F (2009)
- French Open: W (2003)
- Wimbledon: W (2003)
- US Open: W (2000)

Other doubles tournaments
- Tour Finals: F (2003, 2007)
- Olympic Games: SF – 4th (2004)

Mixed doubles
- Career record: 35–21
- Career titles: 1

Grand Slam mixed doubles results
- Australian Open: 2R (1999, 2001, 2003, 2006)
- French Open: SF (2000)
- Wimbledon: SF (2004)
- US Open: W (1999)

Ai Sugiyama (杉山愛, Sugiyama Ai; born July 5, 1975) is a Japanese former tennis player. She reached the world No. 1 ranking in women's doubles on the WTA Tour and had a career-high singles ranking of world No. 8, achieved on February 9, 2004. In her career, she won six singles and 38 doubles titles, including three major titles (one with Julie Halard-Decugis and two partnering Kim Clijsters), and one mixed doubles title (partnering Mahesh Bhupathi). Sugiyama held the all-time record, for both male and female players, for her 62 consecutive Grand Slam tournament main-draw appearances, until she was surpassed by Roger Federer at the 2015 Wimbledon Championships.

== Career ==
=== 1990s ===
In 1993, at age 17, Sugiyama played tennis legend Martina Navratilova in her native city, losing in three sets. The same year, she made her Grand Slam debut at Wimbledon but lost in the first round to world No. 30, Gigi Fernández, in three sets. In 1994, Sugiyama again reached the main draw at Wimbledon but lost to world No. 6 and compatriot, Kimiko Date. Later that year, she reached her first singles final in Surabaya but was forced to retire against Elena Wagner. She went on to win the Japan Open doubles, her first tour title. Later that year, she broke into the WTA top 100. In 1995, she won her first Grand Slam match and reached the fourth round of Roland Garros. In the first round, the Japanese player defeated 15th-seeded Grand Slam runner-up and former top-5 player Helena Suková by 9–7 in the final set, her first victory over a top-20 player. Two months after, she defeated Amanda Coetzer to reach the third round, while losing to world No. 4 and former Wimbledon champion, Conchita Martínez. In November, she made an impressive run at the Oakland Tier-II tournament. While she was only ranked 63, she defeated 22nd-ranked Irina Spîrlea, former Wimbledon runner-up Zina Garrison Jackson, and No. 10, Lindsay Davenport to reach the second final of her career, where she lost to No. 7, Magdalena Maleeva. After this run, Sugiyama broke into the top 50.

In 1996, she reached the third round at the Australian Open. In Miami, seeded 23rd, Sugiyama reached the fourth round, defeating No. 10, Jana Novotná, her second top-10 victory. That moved her into the top 30. She also reached the semifinals of the Japan Open in Tokyo and the fourth round at Wimbledon, where she defeated No. 5, Anke Huber, her third top-10 and first top-5 victory. She represented Japan and reached the third round at the Atlanta Olympics, defeating Martina Hingis.

Sugiyama began 1997 season by playing her third final losing to Elena Likhovtseva, after defeating Sabine Appelmans in the quarterfinals. The following week she reached the second round at the Australian Open. In April, she won her first professional title at the Japan Open against Amy Frazier. However, she could not reach a good result in Grand Slam events, with a second-round exit at the French Open and US Open and a first round loss at Wimbledon. At the end of the year, she reached her first Tier-I final at the Kremlin Cup in Moscow, defeating Natasha Zvereva, No. 14 Brenda Schultz-McCarthy, No. 9 and multi-Grand Slam events winner Arantxa Sánchez Vicario, and Dominique Van Roost before failing in the final against top seed and second-ranked Jana Novotná.

In 1998, she opened with a second singles title in Gold Coast. Then she broke into the top 20 and reached another semifinal in Sydney, defeating Conchita Martínez. Throughout that year, Sugiyama showed consistency: a third WTA Tour title at the Japan Open, quarterfinals in Tokyo (Pan Pacific), Berlin, defeating No. 4, Amanda Coetzer, playing Strasbourg and San Diego, defeating Steffi Graf, Luxembourg, third round in Indian Wells, Miami and Montreal and second round at both French and US Open. In 1999, she reached the final of the Japan Open, the semifinals in Gold Coast and Tokyo (Princess Cup) defeating No. 8, Julie Halard-Decugis, the quarterfinals in Strasbourg and Moscow, defeating No. 6, Mary Pierce, third in Indian Wells, Montreal, defeating No. 7, Jana Novotná, and at the US Open. She also reached the second round at the French Open and Wimbledon. The same year, Sugiyama won the US Open mixed doubles with Mahesh Bhupathi, her first Grand Slam title.

Sugiyama received the WTA Sportsmanship Award in 1999.

=== 2000–2005 ===
Sugiyama reached the final of the women's doubles at Wimbledon, partnered by Halard-Decugis, but lost on July 10 in straight sets to the Williams sisters after a one-day rain delay. On September 10, she won the women's doubles at the US Open, defeating Cara Black and Elena Likhovtseva in three sets, in one hour and 19 minutes. On October 23, she became the first Japanese woman to rank world No. 1 in doubles, winning seven titles in the process.

Her greatest success was Scottsdale 2003. Beating Lindsay Davenport in the second round, she went on to defeat Eleni Daniilidou to progress to the semifinals. Scheduling problems forced both the semifinals and finals matches - for both singles and doubles - to be played on the Sunday of the tournament. Thus in a single day, Sugiyama managed to save a matchpoint in the semifinals against Alexandra Stevenson, rally from a set down to defeat doubles partner Kim Clijsters in the final, and then secure victories in both doubles matches to raise both trophies. The year 2003 proved to be her best year ever, pushing Serena Williams to the limit at Roland Garros and reaching the round of 16 in Wimbledon and US Open where her fourth round loss to Francesca Schiavone at Flushing Meadows was rather controversial. She finished the year ranked tenth, having defeated world No. 1, Justine Henin, in the round robin section of the season-ending championships. She also won a total of eight doubles titles that year, seven with Kim Clijsters (Sydney, Antwerp, Scottsdale, Roland Garros, Wimbledon, San Diego, Zurich) and one with Liezel Huber (Linz).

Sugiyama began 2005 with four consecutive first-round losses. She lost in the first rounds of the first three majors; only at San Diego did she really do well, making it to the final, which she lost in straight sets to Mary Pierce, having defeated Daniela Hantuchová, Sesil Karantacheva and Svetlana Kuznetsova en route. Sugiyama also reached the final in doubles with Hantuchová, losing to Virginia Ruano-Pascual and Conchita Martínez. She broke her Grand Slam tournament "curse", reaching the third round before losing to Clijsters, the eventual champion.

That year, Ai had better results in doubles than in singles. Partnering with Elena Dementieva, she reached the finals of her first tournament, Sydney, losing to Bryanne Stewart and Samantha Stosur. They reached the round of 16 at the Australian Open. She entered a few tournaments with Anastasia Myskina and Elena Likhovtseva, but with poor results. In Berlin, she played again with Daniela Hantuchová, reaching the semifinal, losing to Black and Huber. At the French, they lost to Birnerová and Vanc in the second round. They won their next tournament, in Birmingham over Daniilidou and Russel. At Wimbledon, Hantuchová and Sugiyama reached the quarterfinal, losing to eventual champions Black and Huber. At the Canadian Open in Toronto, they lost the semifinal to eventual champions Grönefeld and Navratilova. At the US Open, they reached the third round, losing to Yan Zi and Zheng Jie. She tried three partners in the next tournaments, before returning to Daniela in Zurich, where they reached the finals (beating top seeds Lisa Raymond and Stosur en route), losing a close three-set match to Black and Rennae Stubbs. They finished the year ranked No. 5, failing to qualify for the year-end championships.

Sugiyama played mixed doubles at two events: the French & the US Open. At Roland Garros, playing with Mirnyi, she lost in the first round. At the US Open, she partnered with Ullyett. The duo reached the quarterfinals, losing to eventual champions Hantuchová and Bhupathi. Entering the Doha with an 0–5 singles record, she managed to beat wildcard Selima Sfar. In the second round, she upset Myskina in three sets, needing several match points to close the match out. In her quarterfinal match against Julia Schruff, she had a comfortable win. She lost in the semifinal, in an epic match against Nadia Petrova. At 0–4 in the second, she won five consecutive games to 5–4. She won the doubles title with Hantuchová, defeating Yan and Zheng in the semifinal and Li Ting and Sun Tiantian in the final.

=== 2006 ===
In Rome, she and Hantuchová won the title, their third as a team and biggest title, beating Li and Sun; Black and Stubbs (No. 2), and Květa Peschke and Schiavone (No. 8).

At the French Open, 22nd seeded Ai beat Daniilidou in the first round, but lost to French qualifier Aravane Rezaï in the second. Deciding not to compete in the mixed, Ai and Daniella beat Caroline Dhenin and Mathilde Johansson, then squashed Sofia Arvidsson and Martina Müller; they escaped in three sets against Marion Bartoli and Shahar Pe'er. In the quarterfinals, they beat second-seeded Black and Stubbs. In the semifinals, they beat fourth-seeded Yan and Zheng but lost in two sets in the final to top-seeded Raymond and Stosur.

Wimbledon saw Sugiyama, the 18th seed, defeat 12th seed Martina Hingis in three sets to advance to the fourth round. The summer brought several bad singles losses, as well as doubles upsets. Sugiyama reached the final in Los Angeles, bowing to Ruano Pascual and Paola Suárez. In Montréal, she beat Aleksandra Wozniak and Anabel Medina Garrigues, before losing to Kuznetsova. In doubles, partnering with Nathalie Dechy, she reached the quarterfinals.

At the US Open seeded 28th, she defeated Zuzana Ondrášková, and Tathiana Garbin, before falling to second seed Justine Henin. In Beijing, she beat qualifier Alicia Molik, who was also her doubles partner in the event, in the first round. She then upset fourth-seeded Nicole Vaidišová in three sets, before losing to Peng Shuai in another three-set match. She reached the final of a Tier-IV event in Seoul, losing to Eleni Daniilidou of Greece in a three-set final.

=== 2007 ===
The beginning of 2007 was better than the prior two years. She lost to Anastasiya Yakimova in the second round of the Australian Open (10–8 in the third), before beating her in Miami. Sugiyama and Daniela Hantuchová reached the quarterfinals, losing to eventual champions Black and Huber. In Tokyo, she reached the quarterfinals, losing in three sets to No. 1, Maria Sharapova. In Doha, she injured her toe, but recovered to reach the round of 16 in Indian Wells. In Miami, she fell to Dinara Safina in the third. She went 0–3 in Fed Cup play versus France, losing to both Tatiana Golovin and Dechy, but rebounded to win 50k Gifu with Ayumi Morita. The Japanese duo lost only one set en route to the title. She played in Berlin with Katarina Srebotnik. They swept Lourdes Domínguez Lino and Flavia Pennetta in a double bagel, but then fell to the second seeded Black and Huber the same day.

Her next tournament was Rome, where she beat Maria Kirilenko in a 2 hours 49 minutes three-set match. She lost to Pe'er in the next round. At Roland Garros, she reached the third round. She defeated Eva Birnerová in the first round and Meilen Tu in the second round, but then fell to Anna Chakvetadze, the ninth seed. In doubles, seeded seventh with Srebotnik, she defeated Lucie Hradecká and Renata Voráčová in the first round, Stéphanie Foretz and Camille Pin, and Pe'er and Safina in the second and third round. They then defeated Maria Elena Camerin and Gisela Dulko in the quarterfinals. They upset top seeds and defending champions Raymond and Stosur in the semifinals, winning in three sets to reach the French Open finals. They lost in the final in straight sets to Alicia Molik and Mara Santangelo.

At Wimbledon, seeded 26th, she beat wildcard Melanie South and Alizé Cornet. She lost against the second seeded Sharapova in the third round. In doubles, she and Srebotnik beat Andreea Ehritt-Vanc and Anastasia Rodionova; Émilie Loit and Nicole Pratt, and got a walkover from Bartoli and Meilen Tu in the third round. In the quarterfinals, they beat Elena Likhovtseva and Sun Tiantian. They came back from 1–6, 0–3 to beat top-seeded Raymond and Stosur, winning in three sets. They lost in the final to the second seeded Black and Huber.

During the US Open Series, she reached the third round of San Diego, where she defeated Sybille Bammer. She then lost to Chakvetadze. She reached two doubles semifinals in San Diego and Stanford with Srebotnik, losing both times to Victoria Azarenka and Chakvetadze. However, they won Toronto, defeating Peng Shuai and Yan in the quarterfinal, Molik and Santangelo, in the semifinal and Black and Huber in the final, winning their first title as a te.

At the US Open, Sugiyama lost in the second round to Ekaterina Makarova. Ai and Srebotnik impressively defeated Sun Shengnan and Ji Chunmei, and eventually defeated Michaëlla Krajicek and Agnieszka Radwańska. The team advanced to the quarterfinals after defeating Loit and Vania King, but lost to eventual champions Dechy and Safina. Srebotnik and Sugiyama continued their form and thus qualified for the Tour Championships, which were held in Madrid. The team, seeded second, defeated the Taiwanese duo of Chan Yung-jan and Chuang Chia-jung, but lost to Black and Huber in the final in a super tiebreak.

=== 2008 ===
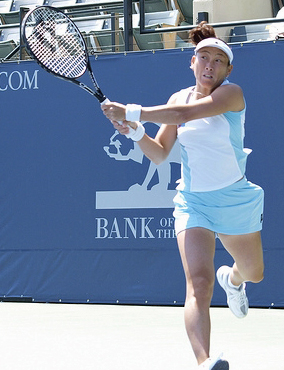
Sugiyama in July 2008

In singles, Sugiyama's season started out badly, as she lost to Azarenka in Gold Coast and Gajdosova in Sydney. However, in Melbourne, her form returned, beating Vera Zvonareva in the first round and Tatiana Perebiynis in the second round, before losing to 12th seed Vaidišová. In doubles, she and Srebotnik lost in straight sets in Sydney to Yan/Zheng, the eventual champions. In Melbourne, they drew the Williams sisters in the second round and lost in two sets. Sugiyama's dream of a career slam died. In doubles, she reached the final in Antwerp with Peschke, as well as the semifinals in Doha and Dubai with Srebotnik.

On March 30 in the third round at the Tier-I event in Miami, she upset eighth seeded Hantuchová in an epic three-set match. She came back after losing a match point in the second set, as well as having served for the match twice in the second set. In the third set, she was down three to none, but still managed to win. It was her first top ten win since Beijing 2006. In the next round, she lost to Zvonareva. In doubles, she and Srebotnik won the title, beating Akiko Morigami and Alina Jidkova, Lucie Hradecká and Renata Voráčová, and Davenport and Hantuchová. They earned the title by beating Australian runners-up Azarenka and Pe'er and No.-1 team Black and Huber. It was their second team title, and Sugiyama's eighth Tier-I title.

Sugiyama won her ninth Tier I doubles title with Srebotnik at Charleston at the Family Circle cup, their third team title, scoring a two-sets win over Edina Gallovits-Hall and Olga Govortsova. Sugiyama broke the record for consecutive slam appearances woman with 57 as of her appearance in the 2008 Wimbledon tournament. Sugiyama made it to the third round of ladies' singles, losing to Alisa Kleybanova of Russia. At Stanford, she defeated Alexa Glatch and then beat world No. 11, Hantuchová. In the quarterfinals she beat Dominika Cibulková, saving three match points in the process. Sugiyama and Ayumi Morita represented their nation at the Summer Olympics, losing in the second round to the Williams.

=== 2009 ===
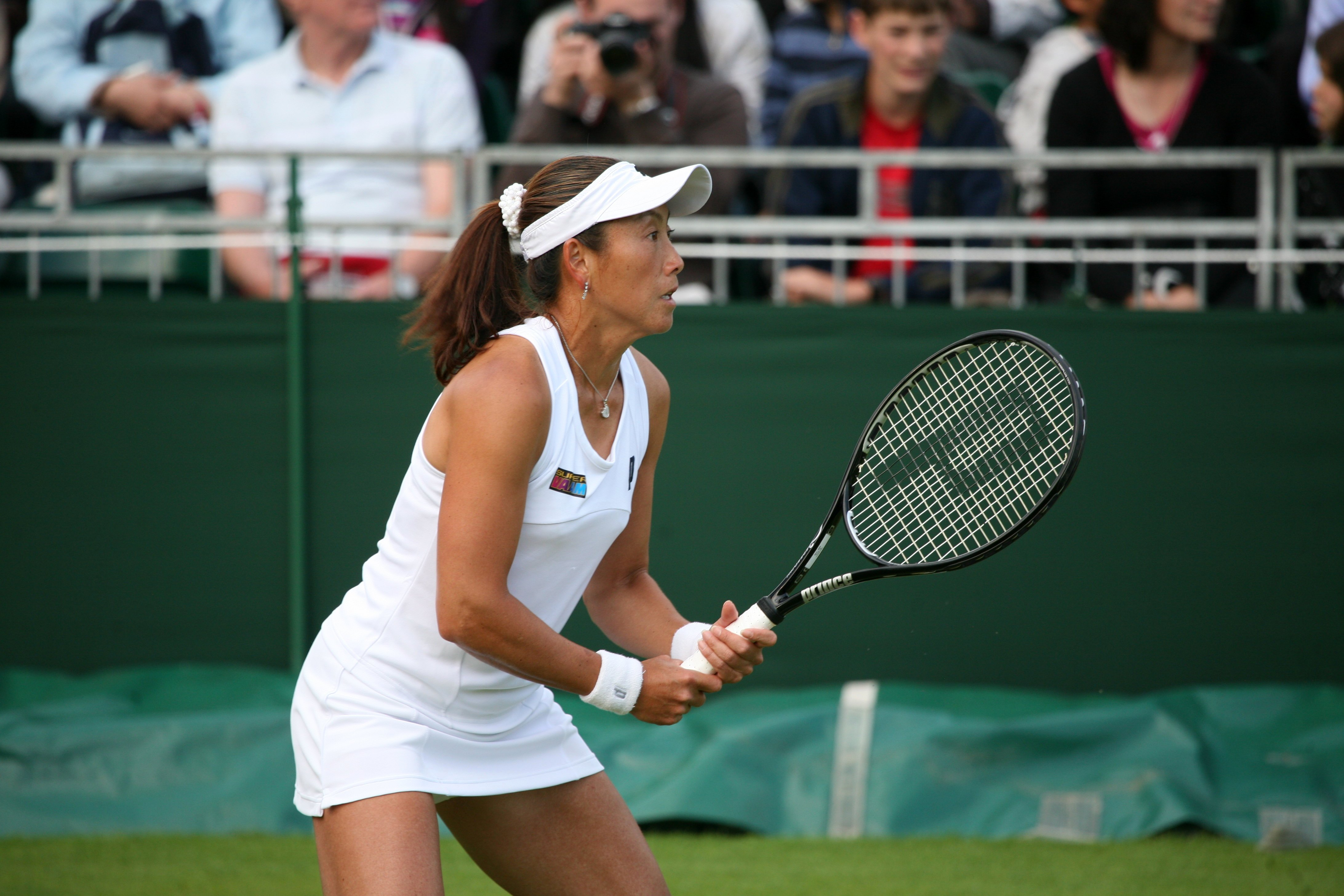
Sugiyama at the 2009 Wimbledon Championships

Ai started with a first-round loss to Stosur, and in the women's doubles a semifinal finish losing to Klaudia Jans and Alicja Rosolska in the Brisbane International partnering Hantuchová. In the Sydney International, Sugiyama made the semifinals eventually losing to Safina.

In the 2009 Australian Open, she made the third round losing to Jelena Janković. As the ninth seed in doubles playing with Hantuchová, they beat the No. 1 seeds, Black and Huber. In the third set "Hantuyama" were down 2–5, but rallied to take it to a tie-break, where they saved seven match points to win 12–10. In the semifinals, they beat Dechy and Santangelo to make it her first women's doubles final there. They were defeated by the Williams in two sets. A respiratory infection forced her to withdraw from the 2009 Open GDF Suez. Sugiyama entered the Dubai Tennis Championships and lost in the opening round to Bartoli in a tight three-set match. Sugiyama and Hantuchová also played doubles but withdrew because of the infection.

At the Indian Wells Open, Sugiyama and Hantuchová were seeded fifth in the women's doubles but lost to the pair Alla Kudryavtseva and Rodionova in the first round. In singles, she lost to qualifier Angela Haynes in the second round. At the Sony Ericsson open she lost her opening matches in singles and doubles, being beaten in the second round in singles after receiving a bye. Her loss in the doubles event with Hantuchová dropped her doubles ranking to No. 5. Sugiyama lost four consecutive singles matches in Miami, Stuttgart, Rome, and Madrid. However alongside Hantuchová, Sugiyama made the finals at the Rome Masters where they lost to the No. 7 seeds, Hsieh Su-wei and Peng. They reached the quarterfinals at the Madrid Masters where they lost to Stosur and Stubbs, whom she and Akgul Amanmuradova beat in the finals at Eastbourne, her 38th doubles title.

On June 22, she extended her record of consecutive major appearances to 61 at Wimbledon, defeating the seeded Patty Schnyder in straight sets to break her eleven-match-losing streak. She lost in the third round to Hantuchová. In Stanford she lost to Sharapova in three sets, saving two match points in the second set. She then lost in the second round in Los Angeles to Radwańska. Sugiyama retired at the end of the 2009 tennis season after the Pan Pacific Open, held in her native country, Japan. A special ceremony for her was held at center court before the tournament. Ai planned a few months at home before concentrating on teaching youngsters at her tennis academy in Japan.

== Grand Slam tournament finals ==
=== Doubles: 10 (3 titles, 7 runner-ups) ===
Result	Year	Championship	Surface	Partner	Opponents	Score
Loss	2000	Wimbledon	Grass	(France) Julie Halard	(United States) Serena Williams (United States) Venus Williams	6–3, 6–2
Win	2000	US Open	Hard	(France) Julie Halard	(Zimbabwe) Cara Black (Russia) Elena Likhovtseva	6–0, 1–6, 6–1
Loss	2001	Wimbledon (2)	Grass	(Belgium) Kim Clijsters	(United States) Lisa Raymond (Australia) Rennae Stubbs	4–6, 3–6
Win	2003	French Open	Clay	(Belgium) Kim Clijsters	(Spain) Virginia Ruano Pascual (Argentina) Paola Suárez	6–7^{(5–7)}, 6–2, 9–7
Win	2003	Wimbledon	Grass	(Belgium) Kim Clijsters	(Spain) Virginia Ruano Pascual (Argentina) Paola Suárez	6–4, 6–4
Loss	2004	Wimbledon (3)	Grass	(South Africa) Liezel Huber	(Zimbabwe) Cara Black (Australia) Rennae Stubbs	3–6, 6–7^{(5–7)}
Loss	2006	French Open	Clay	(Slovakia) Daniela Hantuchová	(United States) Lisa Raymond (Australia) Samantha Stosur	3–6, 2–6
Loss	2007	French Open (2)	Clay	(Slovenia) Katarina Srebotnik	(Australia) Alicia Molik (Italy) Mara Santangelo	6–7^{(5–7)}, 4–6
Loss	2007	Wimbledon (4)	Grass	(Slovenia) Katarina Srebotnik	(Zimbabwe) Cara Black (South Africa) Liezel Huber	6–3, 3–6, 2–6
Loss	2009	Australian Open	Hard	(Slovakia) Daniela Hantuchová	(United States) Serena Williams (United States) Venus Williams	3–6, 3–6

=== Mixed doubles ===
Result	Year	Championship	Surface	Partner	Opponents	Score
Win	1999	US Open	Hard	(India) Mahesh Bhupathi	(United States) Kimberly Po (United States) Donald Johnson	6–4, 6–4

== Other significant finals ==
=== Year-end championships ===
==== Doubles: 2 (runner-ups) ====
Result	Year	Location	Surface	Partner	Opponents	Score
Loss	2003	Los Angeles	Hard (i)	(Belgium) Kim Clijsters	(Spain) Virginia Ruano Pascual (Argentina) Paola Suárez	4–6, 6–3, 3–6
Loss	2007	Madrid	Hard (i)	(Slovenia) Katarina Srebotnik	(Zimbabwe) Cara Black (United States) Liezel Huber	7–5, 3–6, [8–10]

=== Olympic Games ===
==== Doubles medal match ====
Result	Year	Location	Surface	Partner	Opponents	Score
4th place	2004	Athens	Hard	(Japan) Shinobu Asagoe	(Argentina) Paola Suárez (Argentina) Patricia Tarabini	3–6, 3–6

== WTA Tour finals ==
=== Singles: 13 (6 titles, 7 runner-ups) ===
Legend WTA 1000 (Tier I / Premier 5 / Premier M) 0–2) WTA 500 (Tier II / Premier) (2–1) WTA 250 (Tier III / Tier IV / International) (4–4)	Finals by surface Hard (6–5) Carpet (0–2)

Result	W/L	Date	Tournament	Tier	Surface	Opponent	Score
Loss	0–1	Jul 1994	Surabaya Classic, Indonesia	Tier IV	Hard	(Bulgaria) Elena Wagner	6–2, 0–6, ret.
Loss	0–2	Nov 1995	Silicon Valley Classic, US	Tier II	Carpet (i)	(Bulgaria) Magdalena Maleeva	3–6, 4–6
Loss	0–3	Jan 1997	Hardcourt Championships, Australia	Tier III	Hard	(Russia) Elena Likhovtseva	6–3, 6–7^{(7–9)}, 3–6
Win	1–3	Apr 1997	Japan Open	Tier III	Hard	(United States) Amy Frazier	4–6, 6–4, 6–4
Loss	1–4	Nov 1997	Kremlin Cup, Russia	Tier I	Carpet (i)	(Czech Republic) Jana Novotná	3–6, 4–6
Win	2–4	Jan 1998	Hardcourt Championships, Australia	Tier III	Hard	(Venezuela) María Vento-Kabchi	7–5, 6–0
Win	3–4	Apr 1998	Japan Open	Tier III	Hard	(United States) Corina Morariu	6–3, 6–3
Loss	3–5	Oct 1999	Japan Open	Tier III	Hard	(United States) Amy Frazier	2–6, 2–6
Win	4–5	Mar 2003	Scottsdale Classic, US	Tier II	Hard	(Belgium) Kim Clijsters	3–6, 7–5, 6–4
Win	5–5	Oct 2003	Linz Open, Austria	Tier II	Hard	(Russia) Nadia Petrova	7–5, 6–4
Win	6–5	Jan 2004	Hardcourt Championships, Australia	Tier III	Hard	(Russia) Nadia Petrova	1–6, 6–1, 6–4
Loss	6–6	Aug 2005	Carlsbad Open, US	Tier I	Hard	(France) Mary Pierce	0–6, 3–6
Loss	6–7	Oct 2006	Korea Open	Tier IV	Hard	(Greece) Eleni Daniilidou	3–6, 6–2, 6–7^{(3–7)}

=== Doubles: 71 (38 titles, 33 runner-ups) ===
Legend Grand Slam tournaments (3–7) Finals (0–2) WTA 1000 (Tier I / Premier 5 / Premier M) (9–8) WTA 500 (Tier II / Premier) (16–12) WTA 250 (Tier III / Tier IV / International) (10–4)	Finals by surface Hard (25–21) Grass (4–4) Clay (4–5) Carpet (5–3)

Result	No.	Date	Tournament	Tier	Surface	Partner	Opponents	Score
Win	1.	Apr 1994	Japan Open	Tier III	Hard	(Japan) Mami Donoshiro	(Indonesia) Yayuk Basuki (Japan) Nana Miyagi	6–4, 6–1
Loss	1.	Nov 1994	Surabaya Classic, Indonesia	Tier IV	Hard	(Japan) Kyōko Nagatsuka	(Indonesia) Yayuk Basuki (Indonesia) Romana Tedjakusuma	w/o
Win	2.	Jan 1995	Hobart International, Australia	Tier IV	Hard	(Japan) Kyōko Nagatsuka	(Netherlands) Manon Bollegraf (Latvia) Larisa Neiland	2–6, 6–4, 6–2
Loss	2.	Apr 1995	Japan Open	Tier III	Hard	(Japan) Kyōko Nagatsuka	(Japan) Yuka Yoshida (Japan) Miho Saeki	7–6, 4–6, 6–7
Win	3.	Apr 1996	Japan Open	Tier III	Hard	(Japan) Kimiko Date	(United States) Amy Frazier (United States) Kimberly Po	7–6, 6–7, 6–3
Loss	3.	May 1997	Internationaux de Strasbourg, France	Tier III	Clay	(Russia) Elena Likhovtseva	(Czech Republic) Helena Suková (Belarus) Natasha Zvereva	1–6, 1–6
Win	4.	Sep 1997	Princess Cup, Japan	Tier II	Hard	(United States) Monica Seles	(France) Julie Halard-Decugis (United States) Chanda Rubin	6–1, 6–0
Win	5.	Jan 1998	Hardcourt Championships, Australia	Tier III	Hard	(Russia) Elena Likhovtseva	(South Korea) Park Sung-hee (Chinese Taipei) Wang Shi-ting	1–6, 6–3, 6–4
Win	6.	Oct 1998	Luxembourg Open	Tier III	Carpet (i)	(Russia) Elena Likhovtseva	(Latvia) Larisa Neiland (Ukraine) Elena Tatarkova	6–7, 6–3, 2–0 ret.
Win	7.	Nov 1998	Leipzig Cup, Germany	Tier II	Carpet (i)	(Russia) Elena Likhovtseva	(Netherlands) Manon Bollegraf (Romania) Irina Spîrlea	6–3, 6–7, 6–2
Win	8.	Nov 1998	Philadelphia Championships, US	Tier II	Carpet (i)	(Russia) Elena Likhovtseva	(United States) Monica Seles (Belarus) Natasha Zvereva	7–5, 4–6, 6–2
Win	9.	Jan 1999	Sydney International, Australia	Tier II	Hard	(Russia) Elena Likhovtseva	(United States) Mary Joe Fernández (Germany) Anke Huber	6–3, 2–6, 6–0
Loss	4.	Feb 1999	Paris Indoors, France	Tier II	Hard	(Russia) Elena Likhovtseva	(Romania) Irina Spîrlea (Netherlands) Caroline Vis	5–7, 6–3, 3–6
Win	10.	May 1999	Internationaux de Strasbourg, France	Tier III	Clay	(Russia) Elena Likhovtseva	(France) Alexandra Fusai (France) Nathalie Tauziat	2–6, 7–6, 6–1
Loss	5.	Nov 1999	Leipzig Cup, Germany	Tier II	Carpet (i)	(Russia) Elena Likhovtseva	(Latvia) Larisa Neiland (France) Mary Pierce	4–6, 3–6
Win	11.	Jan 2000	Sydney International, Australia	Tier II	Hard	(France) Julie Halard-Decugis	(Switzerland) Martina Hingis (France) Mary Pierce	6–0, 6–3
Win	12.	Apr 2000	Miami Open, United States	Tier I	Hard	(France) Julie Halard-Decugis	(United States) Nicole Arendt (Netherlands) Manon Bollegraf	4–6, 7–5, 6–4
Win	13.	Jun 2000	Eastbourne International, UK	Tier II	Grass	(France) Nathalie Tauziat	(United States) Lisa Raymond (Australia) Rennae Stubbs	2–6, 6–3, 7–6^{(3)}
Loss	6.	Jul 2000	Wimbledon, UK	Grand Slam	Grass	(France) Julie Halard-Decugis	(United States) Serena Williams (United States) Venus Williams	3–6, 2–6
Loss	7.	Aug 2000	Canadian Open	Tier I	Hard	(France) Julie Halard-Decugis	(Switzerland) Martina Hingis (France) Nathalie Tauziat	3–6, 6–3, 4–6
Win	14.	Aug 2000	New Haven Open, US	Tier II	Hard	(France) Julie Halard-Decugis	(Spain) Virginia Ruano Pascual (Argentina) Paola Suárez	6–4, 5–7, 6–2
Win	15.	Sep 2000	US Open	Grand Slam	Hard	(France) Julie Halard-Decugis	(Zimbabwe) Cara Black (Russia) Elena Likhovtseva	6–0, 1–6, 6–1
Win	16.	Oct 2000	Princess Cup, Japan	Tier II	Hard	(France) Julie Halard-Decugis	(Japan) Nana Miyagi (Argentina) Paola Suárez	6–0, 6–2
Loss	8.	Oct 2000	Linz Open, Austria	Tier II	Carpet (i)	(France) Nathalie Tauziat	(France) Amélie Mauresmo (United States) Chanda Rubin	4–6, 4–6
Win	17.	Oct 2000	Kremlin Cup, Russia	Tier I	Carpet (i)	(France) Julie Halard-Decugis	(Switzerland) Martina Hingis (Russia) Anna Kournikova	4–6, 6–4, 7–6^{(5)}
Win	18.	Jan 2001	Canberra International, Australia	Tier III	Hard	(United States) Nicole Arendt	(South Africa) Esmé de Villiers (Australia) Annabel Ellwood	6–4, 7–6^{(2)}
Win	19.	Mar 2001	Indian Wells Open, US	Tier I	Hard	(United States) Nicole Arendt	(Spain) Virginia Ruano Pascual (Argentina) Paola Suárez	6–4, 6–4
Loss	9.	Jul 2001	Wimbledon, UK	Grand Slam	Grass	(Belgium) Kim Clijsters	(United States) Lisa Raymond (Australia) Rennae Stubbs	4–6, 3–6
Loss	10.	Sep 2001	Princess Cup, Japan	Tier II	Hard	(Belgium) Kim Clijsters	(Zimbabwe) Cara Black (South Africa) Liezel Huber	1–6, 3–6
Win	20.	Feb 2002	U.S. National Indoors	Tier III	Hard	(Ukraine) Elena Tatarkova	(United States) Melissa Middleton (United States) Brie Rippner	6–4, 2–6, 6–0
Loss	11.	Aug 2002	San Diego Open, US	Tier II	Hard	(Slovakia) Daniela Hantuchová	(Russia) Elena Dementieva (Slovakia) Janette Husárová	2–6, 4–6
Loss	12.	Aug 2002	LA Championships, US	Tier II	Hard	(Slovakia) Daniela Hantuchová	(Belgium) Kim Clijsters (Federal Republic of Yugoslavia) Jelena Dokić	3–6, 3–6
Loss	13.	Aug 2002	Canadian Open	Tier I	Hard	(Japan) Rika Fujiwara	(Spain) Virginia Ruano Pascual (Argentina) Paola Suárez	4–6, 6–7^{(4)}
Loss	14.	Sep 2002	China Open	Tier IV	Hard	(Japan) Rika Fujiwara	(Russia) Anna Kournikova (Chinese Taipei) Janet Lee	5–7, 3–6
Loss	15.	Oct 2002	Linz Open, Austria	Tier II	Carpet (i)	(Japan) Rika Fujiwara	(Australia) Jelena Dokic (Russia) Nadia Petrova	3–6, 2–6
Win	21.	Jan 2003	Sydney International, Australia	Tier II	Hard	(Belgium) Kim Clijsters	(Spain) Conchita Martínez (Australia) Rennae Stubbs	6–3, 6–3
Win	22.	Feb 2003	Antwerp Games, Belgium	Tier II	Carpet (i)	(Belgium) Kim Clijsters	(France) Nathalie Dechy (France) Émilie Loit	6–2, 6–0
Win	23.	Mar 2003	Scottsdale Classic, US	Tier II	Hard	(Belgium) Kim Clijsters	(United States) Lindsay Davenport (United States) Lisa Raymond	6–1, 6–4
Loss	16.	Mar 2003	Indian Wells Open, US	Tier I	Hard	(Belgium) Kim Clijsters	(United States) Lindsay Davenport (United States) Lisa Raymond	6–3, 4–6, 1–6
Loss	17.	May 2003	German Open	Tier I	Clay	(Belgium) Kim Clijsters	(Spain) Virginia Ruano Pascual (Argentina) Paola Suárez	3–6, 6–4, 4–6
Win	24.	Jun 2003	French Open, France	Grand Slam	Clay	(Belgium) Kim Clijsters	(Spain) Virginia Ruano Pascual (Argentina) Paola Suárez	6–7^{(5)}, 6–2, 9–7
Win	25.	Jul 2003	Wimbledon, UK	Grand Slam	Grass	(Belgium) Kim Clijsters	(Spain) Virginia Ruano Pascual (Argentina) Paola Suárez	6–4, 6–4
Win	26.	Aug 2003	San Diego Open, US	Tier II	Hard	(Belgium) Kim Clijsters	(United States) Lindsay Davenport (United States) Lisa Raymond	6–4, 7–5
Loss	18.	Sep 2003	China Open	Tier II	Hard	(Thailand) Tamarine Tanasugarn	(France) Émilie Loit (Australia) Nicole Pratt	3–6, 3–6
Win	27.	Oct 2003	Zurich Open, Switzerland	Tier I	Hard (i)	(Belgium) Kim Clijsters	(Spain) Virginia Ruano Pascual (Argentina) Paola Suárez	7–6^{(3)}, 6–2
Win	28.	Oct 2003	Linz Open, Austria	Tier II	Hard (i)	(South Africa) Liezel Huber	(France) Marion Bartoli (Italy) Silvia Farina Elia	6–1, 7–6^{(6)}
Loss	19.	Nov 2003	WTA Finals, Los Angeles	Tour Finals	Hard (i)	(Belgium) Kim Clijsters	(Spain) Virginia Ruano Pascual (Argentina) Paola Suárez	4–6, 6–3, 3–6
Loss	20.	Jul 2004	Wimbledon, UK	Grand Slam	Grass	(South Africa) Liezel Huber	(Zimbabwe) Cara Black (Australia) Rennae Stubbs	3–6, 6–7^{(5)}
Win	29.	Aug 2004	Canadian Open	Tier I	Hard	(Japan) Shinobu Asagoe	(South Africa) Liezel Huber (Thailand) Tamarine Tanasugarn	6–0, 6–3
Win	30.	Sep 2004	Bali Classic, Indonesia	Tier III	Hard	(Russia) Anastasia Myskina	(Russia) Svetlana Kuznetsova (Spain) Arantxa Sánchez Vicario	6–3, 7–5
Loss	21.	Jan 2005	Sydney International, Australia	Tier II	Hard	(Russia) Elena Dementieva	(Australia) Bryanne Stewart (Australia) Samantha Stosur	w/o
Win	31.	Jun 2005	Birmingham Classic, UK	Tier III	Grass	(Slovakia) Daniela Hantuchová	(Greece) Eleni Daniilidou (United States) Jennifer Russell	6–2, 6–3
Loss	22.	Aug 2005	San Diego Open, US	Tier I	Hard	(Slovakia) Daniela Hantuchová	(Spain) Conchita Martínez (Spain) Virginia Ruano Pascual	7–6^{(7)}, 1–6, 5–7
Loss	23.	Oct 2005	Zurich Open, Switzerland	Tier I	Hard (i)	(Slovakia) Daniela Hantuchová	(Zimbabwe) Cara Black (Australia) Rennae Stubbs	7–6^{(6)}, 6–7^{(4)}, 3–6
Win	32.	Mar 2006	Qatar Ladies Open	Tier II	Hard	(Slovakia) Daniela Hantuchová	(China) Li Ting (China) Sun Tiantian	6–4, 6–4
Win	33.	May 2006	Italian Open	Tier I	Clay	(Slovakia) Daniela Hantuchová	(Czech Republic) Květa Peschke (Italy) Francesca Schiavone	3–6, 6–3, 6–1
Loss	24.	Jun 2006	French Open, France	Grand Slam	Clay	(Slovakia) Daniela Hantuchová	(United States) Lisa Raymond (Australia) Samantha Stosur	3–6, 2–6
Loss	25.	Aug 2006	LA Championships, US	Tier II	Hard	(Slovakia) Daniela Hantuchová	(Spain) Virginia Ruano Pascual (Argentina) Paola Suárez	3–6, 4–6
Loss	26.	May 2007	French Open, France	Grand Slam	Clay	(Slovenia) Katarina Srebotnik	(Australia) Alicia Molik (Italy) Mara Santangelo	6–7, 4–6
Loss	27.	Jun 2007	Wimbledon, UK	Grand Slam	Grass	(Slovenia) Katarina Srebotnik	(Zimbabwe) Cara Black (United States) Liezel Huber	6–3, 3–6, 2–6
Win	34.	Aug 2007	Canadian Open	Tier I	Hard	(Slovenia) Katarina Srebotnik	(Zimbabwe) Cara Black (United States) Liezel Huber	6–4, 2–6, [10–5]
Loss	28.	Oct 2007	Linz Open, Austria	Tier II	Hard	(Slovenia) Katarina Srebotnik	(Zimbabwe) Cara Black (United States) Liezel Huber	2–6, 6–3, [8–10]
Loss	29.	Nov 2007	WTA Tour Championships, Madrid	Tour Finals	Hard (i)	(Slovenia) Katarina Srebotnik	(Zimbabwe) Cara Black (United States) Liezel Huber	7–5, 3–6, [8–10]
Loss	30.	Feb 2008	Antwerp Games, Belgium	Tier II	Hard (i)	(Czech Republic) Květa Peschke	(Zimbabwe) Cara Black (United States) Liezel Huber	1–6, 3–6
Win	35.	Apr 2008	Miami Open, US	Tier I	Hard	(Slovenia) Katarina Srebotnik	(Zimbabwe) Cara Black (United States) Liezel Huber	7–5, 4–6, [10–3]
Win	36.	Apr 2008	Charleston Open, US	Tier I	Clay	(Slovenia) Katarina Srebotnik	(Romania) Edina Gallovits (Belarus) Olga Govortsova	6–2, 6–2
Win	37.	Oct 2008	Linz Open, Austria	Tier II	Hard (i)	(Slovenia) Katarina Srebotnik	(Zimbabwe) Cara Black (United States) Liezel Huber	6–4, 7–5
Loss	31.	Jan 2009	Australian Open	Grand Slam	Hard	(Slovakia) Daniela Hantuchová	(United States) Serena Williams (United States) Venus Williams	3–6, 3–6
Loss	32.	May 2009	Italian Open, Italy	Premier 5	Clay	(Slovakia) Daniela Hantuchová	(Chinese Taipei) Hsieh Su-wei (China) Peng Shuai	5–7, 6–7^{(5)}
Win	38.	Jun 2009	Eastbourne International, UK	Premier	Grass	(Uzbekistan) Akgul Amanmuradova	(Australia) Samantha Stosur (Australia) Rennae Stubbs	6–4, 6–3
Loss	33.	Oct 2009	Pan Pacific Open, Japan	Premier 5	Hard (i)	(Slovakia) Daniela Hantuchová	(Russia) Alisa Kleybanova (Italy) Francesca Schiavone	4–6, 2–6

== ITF finals ==
$50,000 tournaments
$25,000 tournaments
$10,000 tournaments

=== Singles (1–2) ===
Result	No.	Date	Tournament	Surface	Opponent	Score
Loss	1.	19 July 1992	ITF Evansville, United States	Hard	(Croatia) Iva Majoli	3–6, 1–6
Win	2.	20 July 1992	ITF Roanoke, United States	Hard	(Belarus) Tatiana Ignatieva	6–2, 3–2 ret.
Loss	3.	19 July 1993	ITF St. Simons, United States	Clay	(Japan) Hiromi Nagano	1–6, 1–6

=== Doubles (4–1) ===
Result	No.	Date	Tournament	Surface	Partner	Opponents	Score
Win	1.	10 February 1992	ITF Bangkok, Thailand	Hard	(Japan) Mami Donoshiro	(China) Huang Qian (China) Yang Li-hua	6–4, 3–6, 6–4
Loss	2.	17 February 1992	ITF Bandung, Indonesia	Hard	(Japan) Mami Donoshiro	(China) Chen Li (China) Yi Jingqian	6–4, 3–6, 4–6
Win	3.	26 June 1993	ITF Roanoke, United States	Hard	(Japan) Yoshiko Sasano	(South Africa) Mareze Joubert (Canada) Vanessa Webb	6–4, 6–3
Win	4.	21 August 1994	ITF Fayetteville, United States	Hard	(Japan) Yuka Yoshida	(United States) Andrea Leand (United States) Eleni Rossides	6–4, 7–5
Win	5.	6 May 2007	Kangaroo Cup, Japan	Carpet	(Japan) Ayumi Morita	(Japan) Kumiko Iijima (Japan) Seiko Okamoto	6–1, 3–6, 6–0

== Grand Slam performance timelines ==
Key
W	F	SF	QF	#R	RR	Q#	P#	DNQ	A	Z#	PO	G	S	B	NMS	NTI	P	NH

(W) winner; (F) finalist; (SF) semifinalist; (QF) quarterfinalist; (#R) rounds 4, 3, 2, 1; (RR) round-robin stage; (Q#) qualification round; (P#) preliminary round; (DNQ) did not qualify; (A) absent; (Z#) Davis/Fed Cup Zonal Group (with number indication) or (PO) play-off; (G) gold, (S) silver or (B) bronze Olympic/Paralympic medal; (NMS) not a Masters tournament; (NTI) not a Tier I tournament; (P) postponed; (NH) not held; (SR) strike rate (events won / competed); (W–L) win–loss record.

=== Singles ===
Tournament	1992	1993	1994	1995	1996	1997	1998	1999	2000	2001	2002	2003	2004	2005	2006	2007	2008	2009	W–L
Australian Open	A	Q3	Q1	1R	3R	2R	4R	1R	QF	1R	3R	2R	2R	1R	1R	2R	3R	3R	19–15
French Open	A	Q1	A	4R	1R	2R	2R	2R	4R	1R	2R	4R	2R	1R	2R	3R	2R	1R	18–15
Wimbledon	A	1R	1R	1R	4R	1R	1R	2R	2R	3R	3R	4R	QF	1R	4R	3R	3R	3R	25–17
US Open	Q1	A	1R	2R	2R	2R	2R	3R	2R	2R	2R	4R	4R	3R	3R	2R	3R	1R	22–16
Premier Mandatory tournaments
Indian Wells	Not Tier I				3R	2R	3R	3R	3R	4R	4R	4R	A	A	4R	4R	3R	2R	19–12
Miami	A	A	1R	1R	4R	3R	3R	A	3R	2R	3R	3R	2R	3R	QF	3R	4R	2R	18–16
Madrid	Not held																	1R	0–1
Beijing	Not held												Not Tier I					A	0–0
Premier 5 tournaments
Dubai	Not held									Not Tier I								1R	0–1
Rome	A	A	A	A	A	1R	1R	1R	2R	1R	3R	SF	3R	3R	2R	2R	1R	1R	11–13
Cincinnati	Not held												Not Tier I					1R	0–1
Canada	A	A	A	A	A	2R	3R	3R	1R	2R	3R	A	3R	2R	3R	1R	QF	2R	15–12
Tokyo	NH	1R	1R	1R	2R	2R	QF	2R	1R	QF	1R	2R	QF	1R	1R	QF	1R	1R	20–18
Former Tier I tournaments
Moscow	NH	Not Tier I				F	1R	QF	2R	A	A	A	1R	A	A	A	A	NM5	7–5
Charleston	A	A	A	A	A	2R	1R	A	A	1R	2R	A	A	3R	A	A	2R	NM5	5–6
Zürich	NT1	A	A	A	A	2R	1R	1R	1R	A	1R	2R	QF	1R	2R	Q3	NTI	Not held	20–17
San Diego	Not Tier I												QF	F	1R	3R	NTI	Not held	9–4
Doha	Not held									Not Tier I							3R	Not held	2–1
Berlin	A	A	A	A	1R	1R	QF	1R	1R	2R	A	1R	3R	1R	1R	A	A	Not held	5–10
Career statistics
Tournaments played	4	8	11	17	19	26	23	23	25	25	27	26	24	27	25	23	24	19	376
Finals reached	0	0	1	1	0	3	2	1	0	0	0	2	1	1	1	0	0	0	13
Tournaments won	0	0	0	0	0	1	2	0	0	0	0	2	1	0	0	0	0	0	6
Overall win–loss	1–4	3–8	9–11	14–17	24–21	32–28	37–21	29–24	22–26	28–25	37–27	48–26	33–25	31–27	30–25	22–25	27–26	9–22	436–388
Year-end ranking	180	142	72	46	32	20	18	24	33	30	24	10	17	30	26	38	31	N/A	N/A

=== Doubles ===
Tournament	1993	1994	1995	1996	1997	1998	1999	2000	2001	2002	2003	2004	2005	2006	2007	2008	2009	SR	W–L
Australian Open	1R	A	2R	2R	1R	QF	2R	QF	SF	3R	QF	SF	3R	3R	QF	2R	F	0 / 16	35–16
French Open	A	A	2R	2R	2R	3R	QF	SF	3R	SF	W	1R	2R	F	F	2R	3R	1 / 15	38–14
Wimbledon	Q2	1R	1R	1R	1R	3R	2R	F	F	3R	W	F	QF	1R	F	2R	2R	1 / 14	36–15
US Open	A	2R	3R	1R	2R	–	1R	W	A	1R	2R	SF	3R	2R	QF	SF	3R	1 / 11	27–13
Year-end championships
WTA Finals	A	A	A	A	A	QF	QF	QF	A	SF	F	A	A	A	F	SF	A	0 / 7	3–7
Premier Mandatory tournaments
Indian Wells	Not Tier I				2R	QF	QF	2R	W	2R	F	A	A	QF	1R	SF	1R	1 / 11	21–10
Miami	A	A	QF	2R	1R	QF	A	W	1R	1R	QF	QF	1R	QF	1R	W	1R	2 / 14	20–12
Madrid	Not held																QF	0 / 1	2–1
Beijing	Not Held											Not Tier I					A	0 / 0	0–0
Premier 5 tournaments
Dubai	Not held								Not Tier I								A	0 / 0	0–0
Rome	A	A	A	A	1R	2R	2R	QF	QF	QF	A	2R	QF	W	2R	2R	F	1 / 12	14–11
Cincinnati	Not held											Not Tier I					QF	0 / 1	1–1
Canada	A	A	A	A	2R	2R	QF	F	QF	F	A	W	SF	QF	W	QF	SF	2 / 12	28–10
Tokyo	QF	1R	1R	1R	1R	SF	QF	1R	SF	1R	SF	QF	SF	QF	1R	1R	F	0 / 17	15–16
Former Tier I tournaments
Moscow	Not Tier I				SF	1R	SF	W	A	A	A	SF	A	A	A	A	NM5	0 / 5	10–4
Charleston	A	A	A	A	2R	1R	A	A	A	1R	A	A	2R	A	A	W	NM5	1 / 5	5–4
Zürich	A	A	A	A	1R	QF	QF	1R	A	1R	W	A	SF	QF	SF	NTI	Not held	1 / 9	11–8
San Diego	Not Tier I											1R	F	QF	SF	NTI	Not held	0 / 4	7–4
Doha	Not held								Not Tier I							SF	Not held	0 / 1	2–1
Berlin	A	A	A	2R	QF	2R	QF	A	A	F	A	SF	QF	QF	A	A	Not held	0 / 8	13–8
Philadelphia	A	A	1R	Tier II					not held		T II			not held				0 / 1	0–1
Career statistics
Tournaments played	11	12	16	14	23	22	23	25	17	26	22	19	23	21	21	21	17	333	
Finals reached	0	2	2	1	2	4	3	10	4	6	14	3	4	4	5	4	4	13	
Tournaments won	0	1	1	1	1	4	2	7	2	1	8	2	1	2	1	3	1	38	
Overall win–loss	8–10	16–9	18–15	11–12	23–22	38–18	31–21	59–17	35–15	40–24	59–12	36–16	35–20	37–18	38–19	40–17	29–15	566–295	
Year-end ranking	208	53	45	77	25	13	16	2	9	12	3	9	14	12	6	6	–	No. 1	

=== Mixed doubles ===
Tournament	1996	1997	1998	1999	2000	2001	2002	2003	2004	2005	2006	2007	2008	W–L
Australian Open	A	A	A	2R	A	2R	A	2R	A	A	2R	A	A	4–4
French Open	3R	A	A	QF	SF	1R	A	A	A	1R	A	1R	A	9–6
Wimbledon	1R	A	A	2R	A	QF	A	A	SF	A	1R	A	QF	11–6
US Open	A	A	A	W	1R	SF	A	A	2R	QF	A	A	1R	11–5

== WTA Tour career earnings ==
Year	Grand Slam singles titles	WTA singles titles	Total singles titles	Earnings ($)	Money list rank
1992–94	0	0	0	132,587	n/a
1995	0	0	0	154,316	37
1996	0	0	0	160,077	43
1997	0	1	1	307,837	26
1998	0	2	2	377,728	19
1999	0	0	0	405,148	24
2000	0	0	0	729,635	12
2001	0	0	0	436,427	26
2002	0	0	0	416,408	26
2003	0	2	2	1,254,283	7
2004	0	1	1	736,354	17
2005	0	0	0	495,592	25
2006	0	0	0	595,062	25
2007	0	0	0	691,897	21
2008	0	0	0	757,201	18
2009	0	0	0	477,574	44
Career	0	6	6	8,128,126	27

Awards
Preceded by (Indonesia) Yayuk Basuki	Karen Krantzcke Sportsmanship Award; 1999	Succeeded by (Belgium) Kim Clijsters
