= David Roditi =

Mexican tennis player

Current position
- Title: Head coach
- Team: TCU
- Conference: Big 12

Biographical details
- Born: November 30, 1973 (age 52); Mexico City, Mexico
- Education: Texas Christian University

Playing career
- 1993–1996: Texas Christian University

Coaching career (HC unless noted)
- 2000–2002: Texas (assistant)
- 2010–present: TCU

Accomplishments and honors

Championships
- NCAA Tournament: 2024; ITA Indoor National Championship: 2022, 2023; Big 12: 2016, 2017, 2018, 2021, 2022; Big 12 Tournament: 2016, 2017, 2023

Awards
- Wilson/ITA National Coach of the Year: 2015; Big 12 Coach of the Year: 2015, 2016

David Roditi Jiménez (born November 30, 1973) is a tennis coach and former player from Mexico. He is currently serving as the head men's tennis coach at Texas Christian University, his alma mater.

Born in Mexico City, Roditi grew up in Guadalajara and Manzanillo, then moved to the United States as a teenager; he attended high school in San Clemente, California.

Roditi participated in 10 Davis Cup ties for Mexico from 1997 to 2000, posting a 5–5 record in doubles. He was also Mexico's Davis Cup captain in 2016.

== Playing career ==
Roditi played at Texas Christian University from 1993 to 1996 under head coach Bernard Bartzen. During this time, playing both singles and doubles, he won a school-record 250 total matches. He earned All-Southwest Conference honors in both singles and doubles in 1994, 1995 and 1996 and was named to the Rolex Collegiate All-Star team in 1996. He was named to the Letterman's Hall of Fame for Texas Christian University in 2007.

As a professional, Roditi focused mostly on doubles competition, in which he achieved a career-high world ranking of 41 in 1998 and made the finals in four events:

Result	W-L	Date	Tournament	Surface	Partner	Opponents	Score
Loss	0–1	Aug 1997	San Marino	Clay	(United States) Brandon Coupe	(Italy) Cristian Brandi (Italy) Filippo Messori	5–7, 4–6
Loss	0–2	Feb 1998	Memphis, U.S.	Hard (i)	(South Africa) Ellis Ferreira	(Australia) Todd Woodbridge (Australia) Mark Woodforde	3–6, 4–6
Loss	0–3	Apr 1998	Estoril, Portugal	Clay	(Netherlands) Fernon Wibier	(United States) Donald Johnson (United States) Francisco Montana	1–6, 6–2, 1–6
Loss	0–4	Oct 1998	Mexico City, Mexico	Clay	(Argentina) Daniel Orsanic	(Czech Republic) Jiří Novák (Czech Republic) David Rikl	4–6, 2–6

== Coaching career ==
Following the conclusion of his professional playing career, Roditi moved to Austin, Texas in 2000 to become an assistant coach at the University of Texas and then as the Associate Director of Tennis at St. Stephen's Episcopal School. In 2005, he moved to Carson, California to become the Lead National Team Coach at the USTA Training Center.

On September 7, 2010, Roditi was named the head men's tennis coach at TCU.

== Head coaching record ==
Record table
Season	Team	Overall	Conference	Standing	Postseason
TCU Horned Frogs (Mountain West Conference) (2011–2012)
2011	TCU	13–13	5–1	2nd	
2012	TCU	9–15	2–3	4th	
TCU Horned Frogs (Big 12) (2013–present)
2013	TCU	18–10	2–3	4th	NCAA 1st Round
2014	TCU	12–12	1–4	6th	
2015	TCU	25–8	3–2	T-3rd	NCAA Final Four
2016	TCU	26–4	4–1	1st	NCAA Round of 16
2017	TCU	22–5	5–0	1st	NCAA Round of 8
2018	TCU	20–5	5–0	1st	NCAA Round of 16
2019	TCU	22–7	3–2	3rd	NCAA Round of 8
2020	TCU	12–4	0–0		Season ended early due to COVID-19
2021	TCU	19–8	4–1	1st	NCAA Round of 8
2022	TCU	26–5	5–0	1st	NCAA Round of 8
2023	TCU	26–3	4–1	2nd	NCAA Final Four
2024	TCU	28–4	5–2	2nd	NCAA Division I Champions
2025	TCU	27–4	8-0	1st	NCAA Final Four
TCU:		278–103 (.730)	48–23 (.676)		
Total:		278–103 (.730)			
National champion Postseason invitational champion Conference regular season champion Conference regular season and conference tournament champion Division regular season champion Division regular season and conference tournament champion Conference tournament champion
