= 2013 in tennis =

This page covers all the important events in the sport of tennis in 2013. Primarily, it provides the results of notable tournaments throughout the year on both the ATP and WTA Tours, the Davis Cup, and the Fed Cup.

== ATP World Tour ==
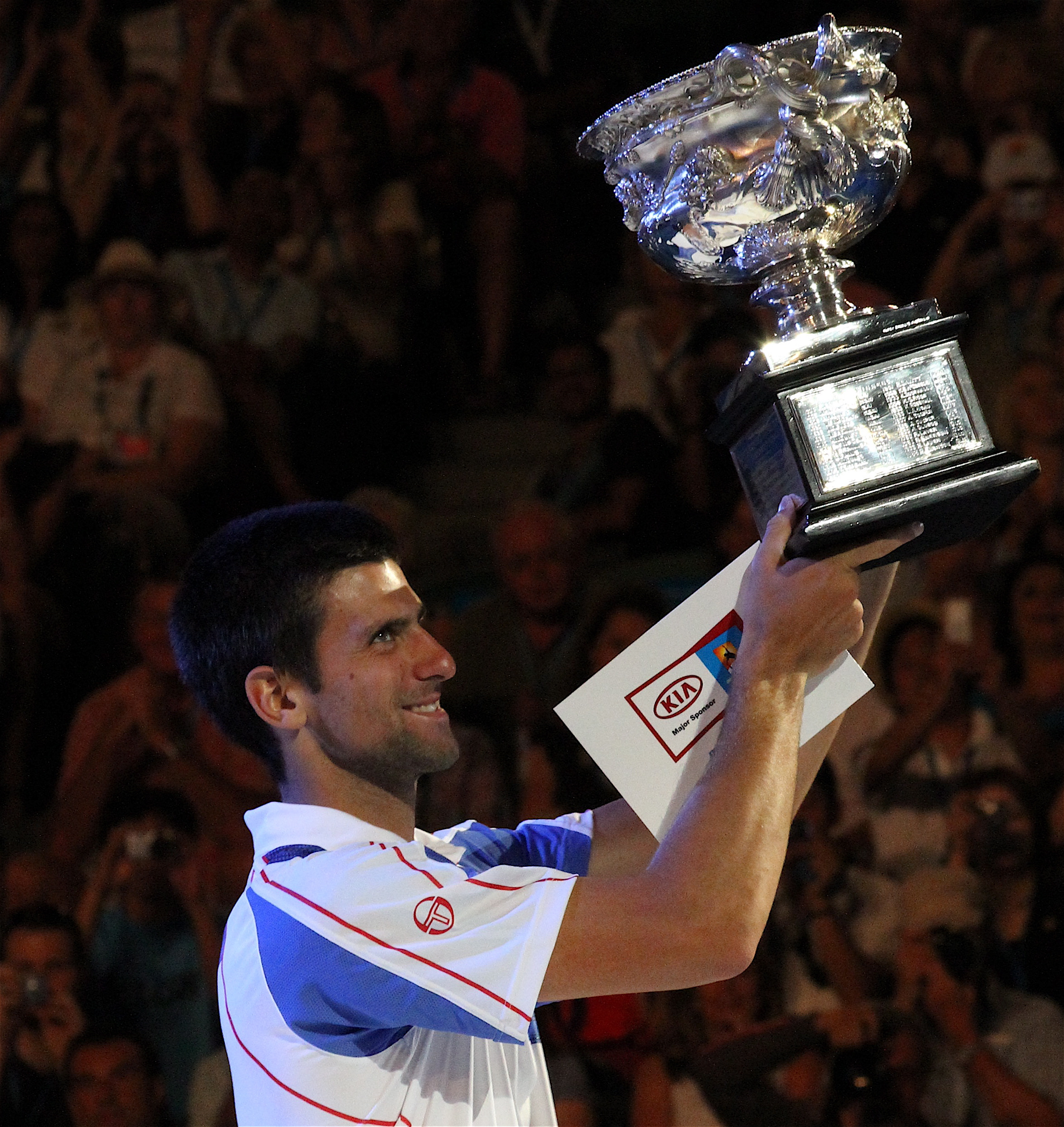
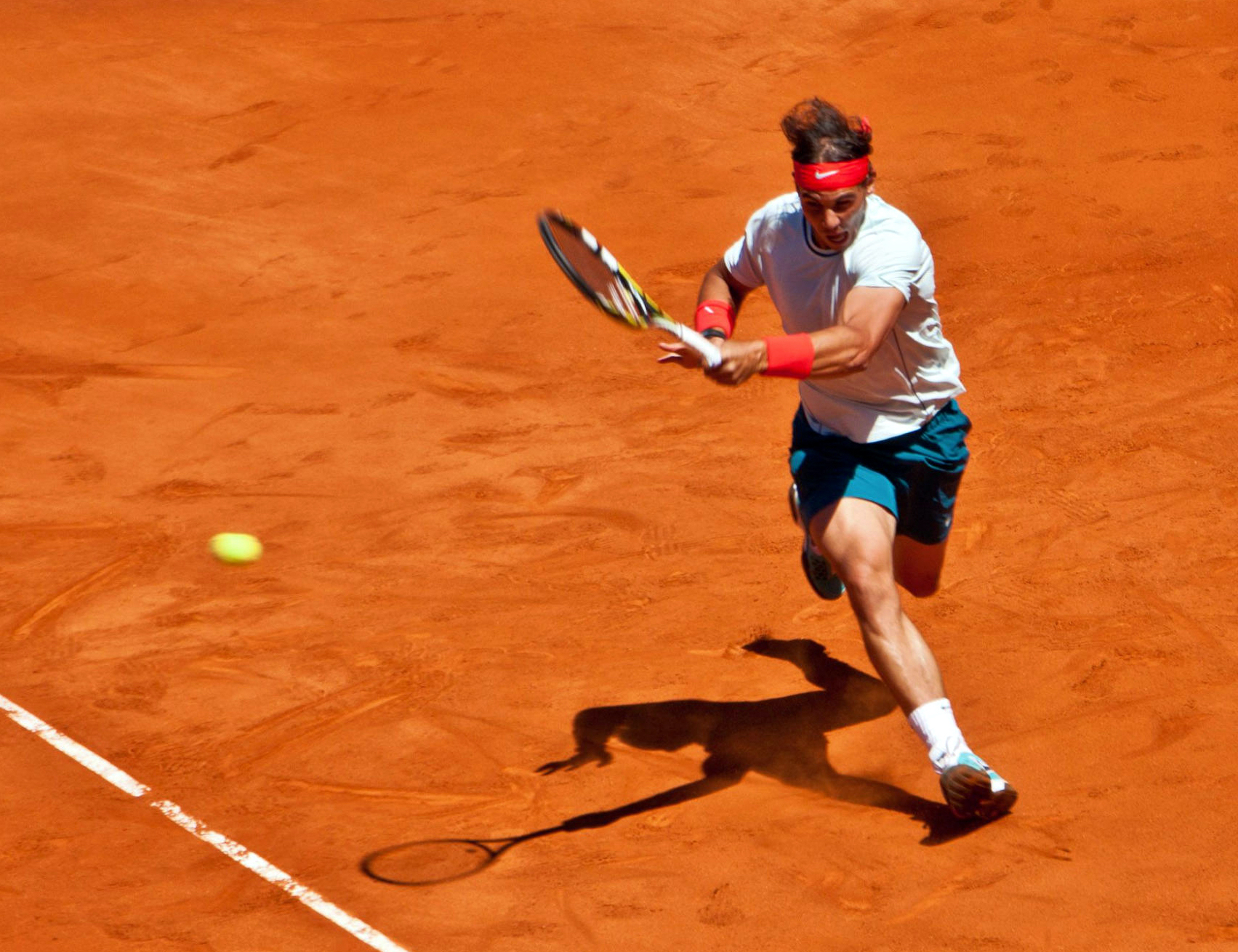
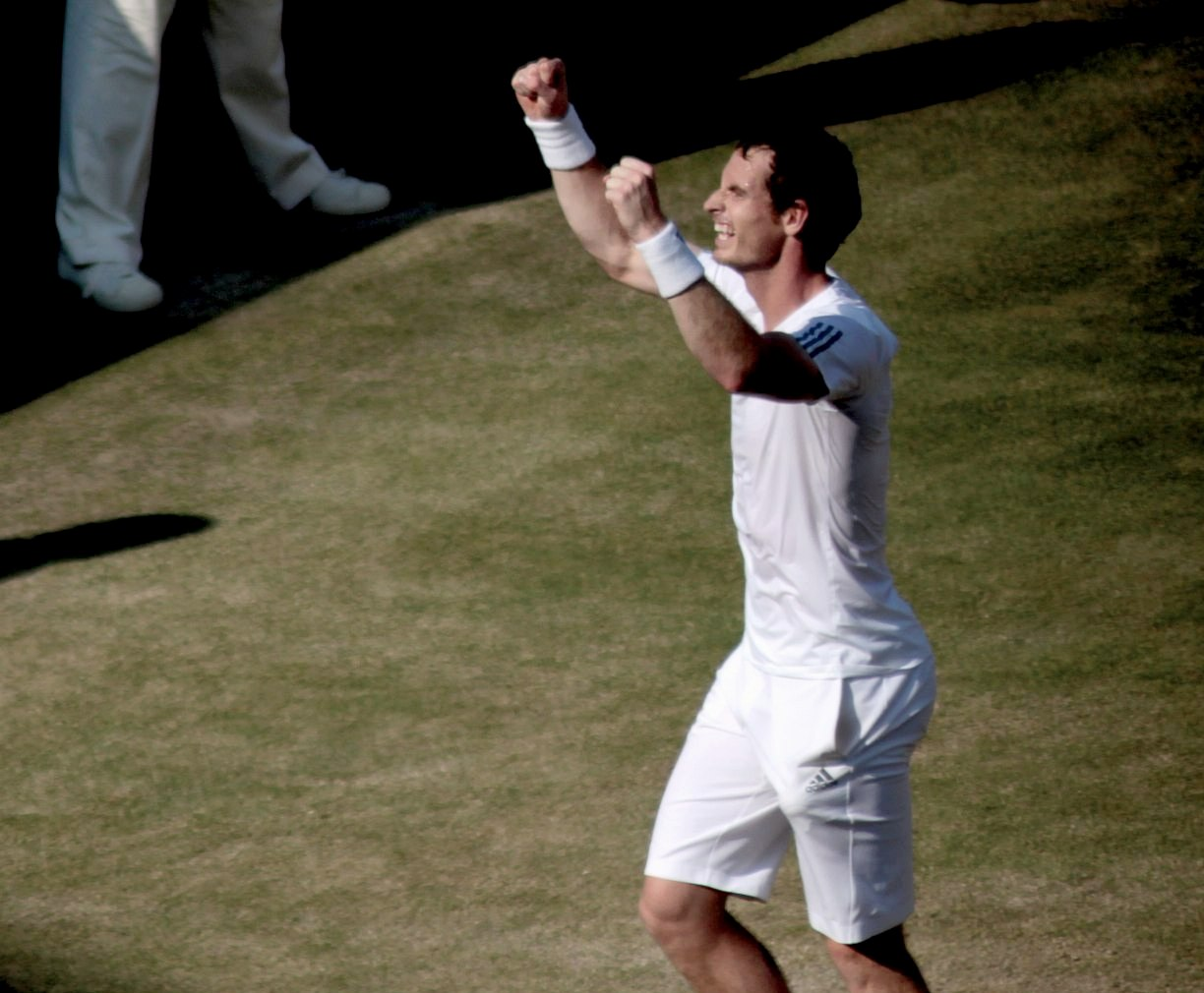
Novak Djokovic, Rafael Nadal, Andy Murray and Rafael Nadal won the four Grand Slams of 2013. For Djokovic, it was his record third consecutive Australian Open title. For Nadal, it was a record eighth title at Roland Garros. For Murray, it was the end of a 77 year drought since a British man won Wimbledon, and the first time since 2003 that a male player won his home Grand Slam tournament. Rafael Nadal won his 2nd US Open defeating the serbian.

The 2013 ATP World Tour was the global elite professional tennis circuit organized by the Association of Tennis Professionals (ATP) for the 2013 tennis season. The 2013 ATP World Tour calendar comprises the Grand Slam tournaments (supervised by the International Tennis Federation (ITF)), the ATP World Tour Masters 1000, the ATP World Tour 500 series, the ATP World Tour 250 series, the Davis Cup (organized by the ITF) and the ATP World Tour Finals. Also included in the 2013 calendar is the Hopman Cup, which was organized by the ITF.

=== ATP World Tour Masters 1000 ===
The ATP World Tour Masters 1000 was a series of 9 tennis tournaments that are part of the Association of Tennis Professionals (ATP) tour, held annually throughout the year in Europe, North America and Asia. The series constituted the most prestigious tournaments in men's tennis after the four Grand Slam events and the ATP World Tour Finals.

Week of	Tournament	Also currently known as	Court surface	Winner	Runner-up	Score
Singles
March 4	(United States) Indian Wells	BNP Paribas Open	Hard	(Spain) Rafael Nadal	(Argentina) Juan Martín del Potro	4–6, 6–3, 6–4
March 18	(United States) Miami	Sony Open Tennis	Hard	(United Kingdom) Andy Murray	(Spain) David Ferrer	2–6, 6–4, 7–6^{(7–1)}
April 15	(Monaco) Monte Carlo	Monte Carlo Rolex Masters	Clay	(Serbia) Novak Djokovic	(Spain) Rafael Nadal	6–2, 7–6^{(7–1)}
May 6	(Spain) Madrid	Mutua Madrid Open	Clay	(Spain) Rafael Nadal	(Switzerland) Stanislas Wawrinka	6–2, 6–4
May 13	(Italy) Rome	Internazionali BNL d'Italia	Clay	(Spain) Rafael Nadal	(Switzerland) Roger Federer	6–1, 6–3
August 5	(Canada) Montreal	Rogers Cup	Hard	(Spain) Rafael Nadal	(Canada) Milos Raonic	6–2, 6–2
August 12	(United States) Cincinnati	Western & Southern Open	Hard	(Spain) Rafael Nadal	(United States) John Isner	7–6^{(10–8)}, 7–6^{(7–3)}
October 7	(China) Shanghai	Shanghai Rolex Masters	Hard	(Serbia) Novak Djokovic	(Argentina) Juan Martín del Potro	6–1, 3–6, 7–6^{(7–3)}
October 28	(France) Paris	BNP Paribas Masters	Hard (i)	(Serbia) Novak Djokovic	(Spain) David Ferrer	7–5, 7–5
ATP World Tour Finals
4 November	(United Kingdom) London	Barclays ATP World Tour Finals	Hard (i)	(Serbia) Novak Djokovic	(Spain) Rafael Nadal	6–3, 6–4
Doubles
Week of	Tournament	Also currently known as	Court Surface	Winners	Runner-up	
March 4	(United States) Indian Wells	BNP Paribas Open	Hard	(United States) Bob Bryan (United States) Mike Bryan	(Philippines) Treat Conrad Huey (Poland) Jerzy Janowicz	6–3, 3–6, [10–6]
March 18	(United States) Miami	Sony Open Tennis	Hard	(Pakistan) Aisam-ul-Haq Qureshi (Netherlands) Jean-Julien Rojer	(Poland) Mariusz Fyrstenberg (Poland) Marcin Matkowski	6–4, 6–1
April 15	(Monaco) Monte Carlo	Monte Carlo Rolex Masters	Clay	(France) Julien Benneteau (Serbia) Nenad Zimonjić	(United States) Bob Bryan (United States) Mike Bryan	4–6, 7–6^{(7–4)}, [14–12]
May 6	(Spain) Madrid	Mutua Madrid Open	Clay	(United States) Bob Bryan (United States) Mike Bryan	(Austria) Alexander Peya (Brazil) Bruno Soares	6–2, 6–3
May 13	(Italy) Rome	Internazionali BNL d'Italia	Clay	(United States) Bob Bryan (United States) Mike Bryan	(India) Mahesh Bhupathi (India) Rohan Bopanna	6–2, 6–3
August 5	(Canada) Montreal	Rogers Cup	Hard	(Austria) Alexander Peya (Brazil) Bruno Soares	(United Kingdom) Colin Fleming (United Kingdom) Andy Murray	6–4, 7–6^{(7–4)}
August 12	(United States) Cincinnati	Western & Southern Open	Hard	(United States) Bob Bryan (United States) Mike Bryan	(Spain) Marcel Granollers (Spain) Marc López	6–4, 4–6, [10–4]
October 7	(China) Shanghai	Shanghai Rolex Masters	Hard	(Croatia) Ivan Dodig (Brazil) Marcelo Melo	(Spain) David Marrero (Spain) Fernando Verdasco	7–6^{(7–2)}, 6–7^{(6–8)}, [10–2]
October 28	(France) Paris	BNP Paribas Masters	Hard (i)	(United States) Bob Bryan (United States) Mike Bryan	(Austria) Alexander Peya (Brazil) Bruno Soares	6–3, 6–3
ATP World Tour Finals
4 November	(United Kingdom) London	Barclays ATP World Tour Finals	Hard (i)	(Spain) David Marrero (Spain) Fernando Verdasco	(United States) Bob Bryan (United States) Mike Bryan	7–5, 6–7^{(3–7)}, [10–7]

=== ATP Challenger Tour ===
The Association of Tennis Professionals (ATP) Challenger Tour was the secondary professional tennis circuit organized by the ATP. The 2013 ATP Challenger Tour calendar comprises 15 top tier Tretorn SERIE+ tournaments, and approximately 150 regular series tournaments.

== WTA Tour ==
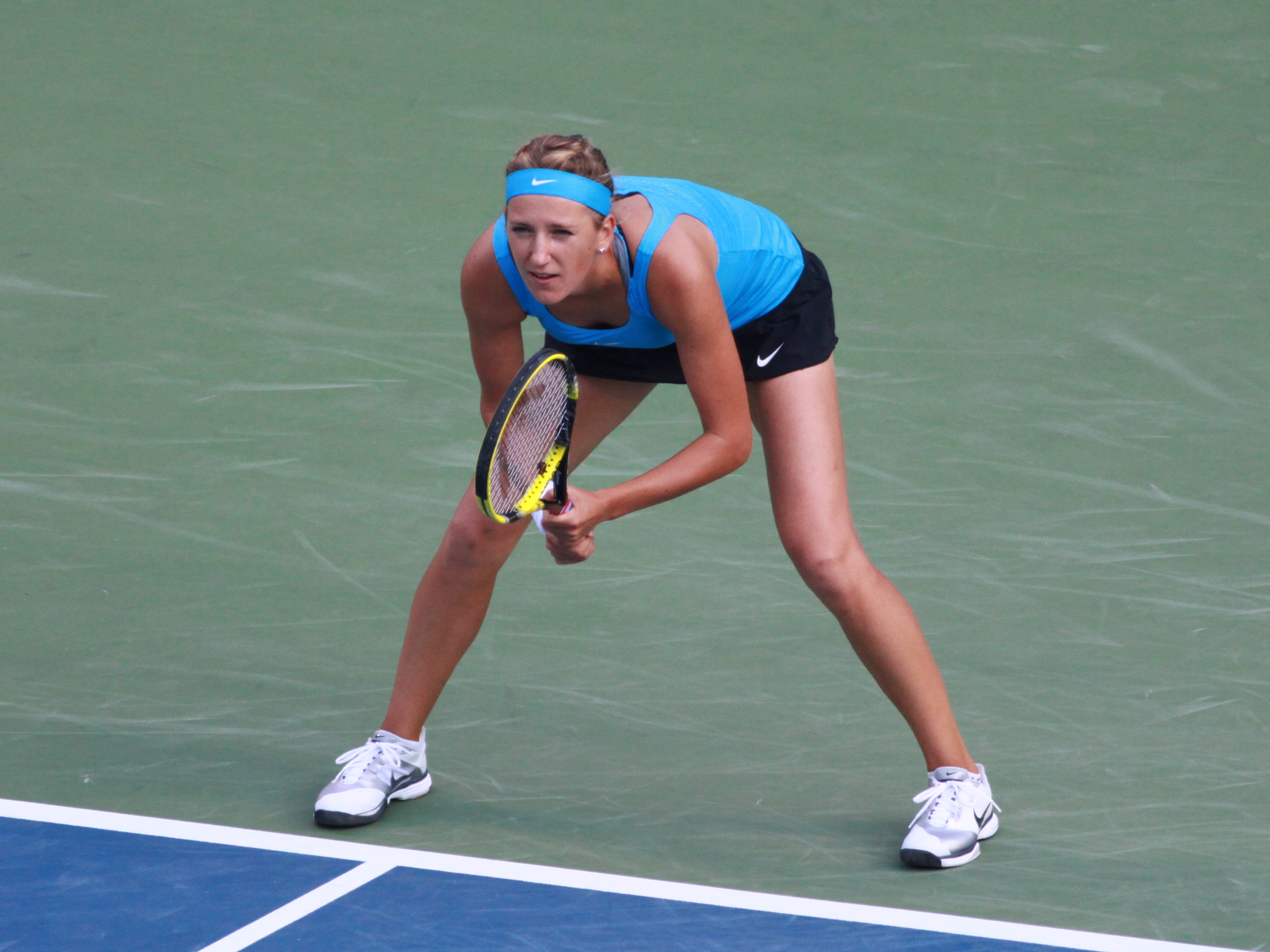
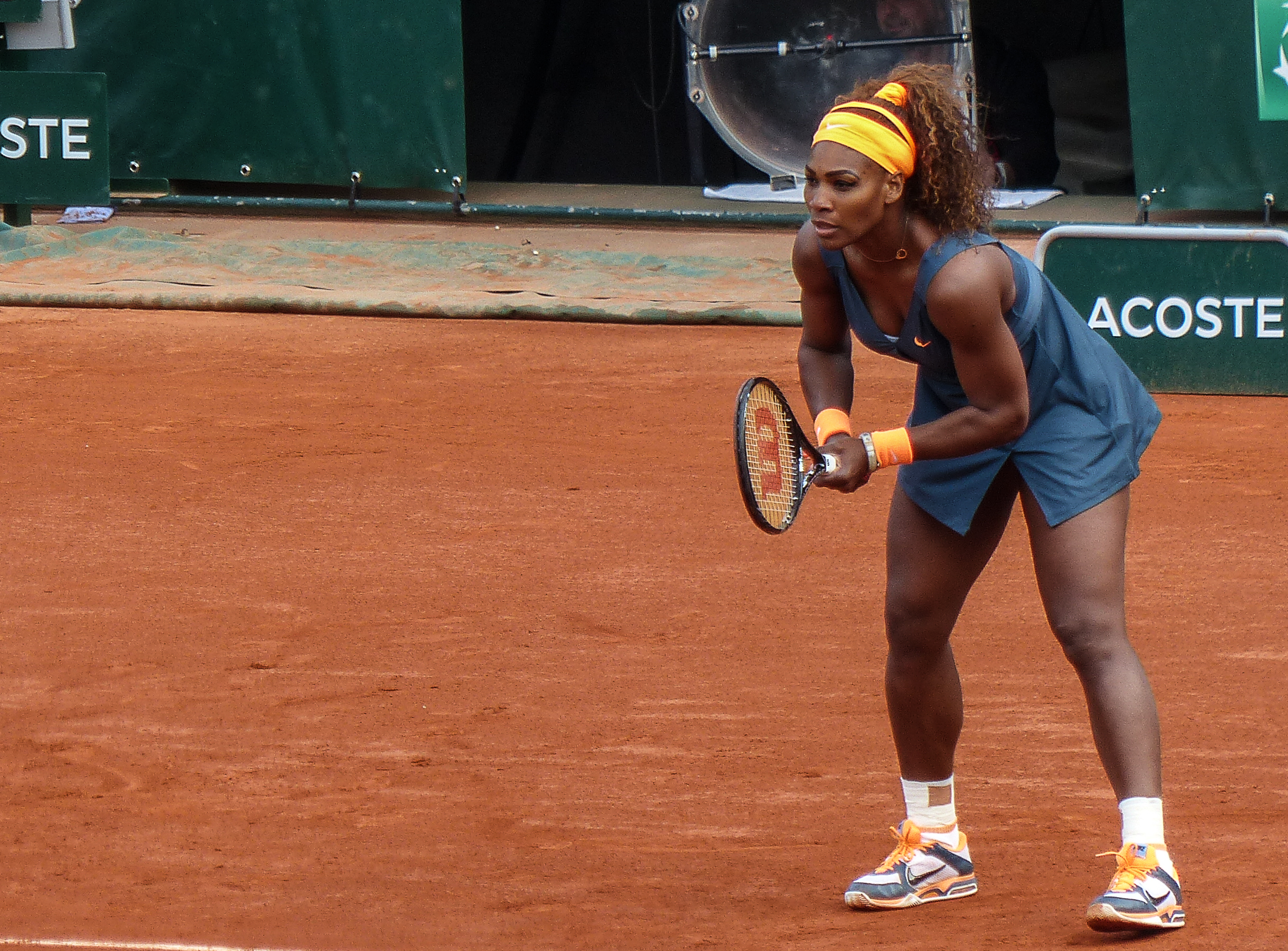
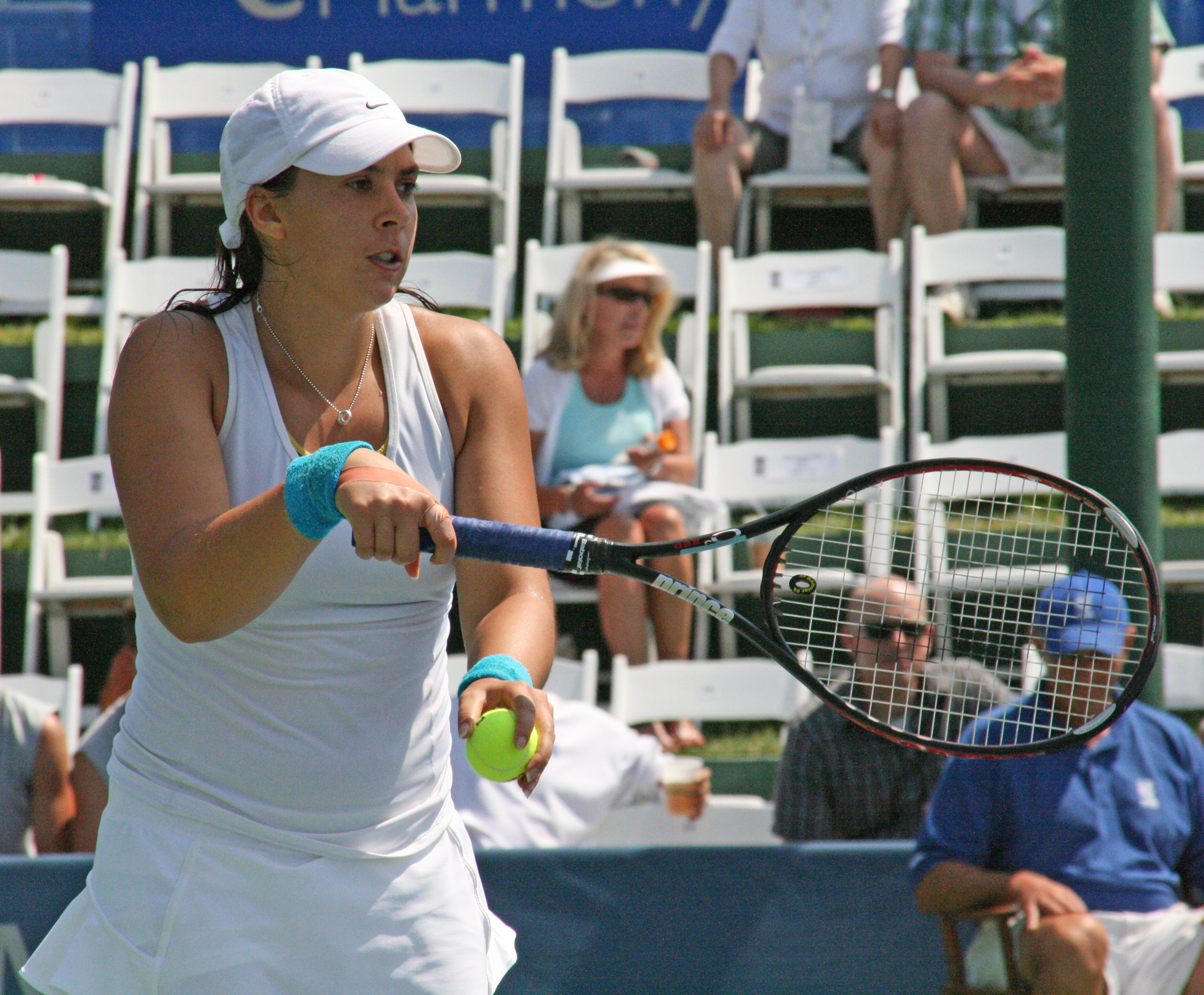
Victoria Azarenka (left) claimed her second major by successfully defending the 2013 Australian Open, defeating Li Na in the finals. Serena Williams won the 2013 French Open, winning her second French Open title by defeating defending champion Maria Sharapova in the final eleven years after her first. Marion Bartoli won her first major at the 2013 Wimbledon Championships, defeating first time finalist Sabine Lisicki.

The 2013 WTA Tour was the elite professional tennis circuit organized by the Women's Tennis Association (WTA) for the 2013 tennis season. The 2013 WTA Tour calendar comprises the Grand Slam tournaments (supervised by the International Tennis Federation (ITF)), the WTA Premier tournaments (Premier Mandatory, Premier 5, and regular Premier), the WTA International tournaments, the Fed Cup (organized by the ITF) and the year-end championships (the WTA Tour Championships and the WTA Tournament of Champions).

=== WTA Premier tournaments ===
The WTA Premier tournaments were 21 of the tennis tournaments divided into three levels on the 2013 WTA Tour.

Week of	Tournament	Also currently known as	Court surface	Winner	Runner-up	Score
Premier Mandatory
4 March	(United States) Indian Wells	BNP Paribas Open	Hard	(Russia) Maria Sharapova	(Denmark) Caroline Wozniacki	6–2, 6–2
18 March	(United States) Miami	Sony Open Tennis	Hard	(United States) Serena Williams	(Russia) Maria Sharapova	4–6, 6–3, 6–0
6 May	(Spain) Madrid	Mutua Madrid Open	Clay	(United States) Serena Williams	(Russia) Maria Sharapova	6–1, 6–4
30 September	(China) Beijing	China Open	Hard	(United States) Serena Williams	(Serbia) Jelena Janković	6–2, 6–2
Premier 5
11 February	(Qatar) Doha	Qatar Total Open	Hard	(Belarus) Victoria Azarenka	(United States) Serena Williams	7–6^{(8–6)}, 2–6, 6–3
13 May	(Italy) Rome	Internazionali BNL d'Italia	Clay	(United States) Serena Williams	(Belarus) Victoria Azarenka	6-1, 6–3
5 August	(Canada) Toronto	Rogers Cup	Hard	(United States) Serena Williams	(Romania) Sorana Cîrstea	6–2, 6–0
12 August	(United States) Cincinnati	Western & Southern Open	Hard	(Belarus) Victoria Azarenka	(United States) Serena Williams	2–6, 6–2, 7–6^{(8–6)}
23 September	(Japan) Tokyo	Toray Pan Pacific Open	Hard	(Czech Republic) Petra Kvitová	(Germany) Angelique Kerber	6–2, 0–6, 6–3
Premier
31 December	(Australia) Brisbane	Brisbane International	Hard	(United States) Serena Williams	(Russia) Anastasia Pavlyuchenkova	6–2, 6–1
7 January	(Australia) Sydney	Apia International Sydney	Hard	(Poland) Agnieszka Radwańska	(Slovakia) Dominika Cibulková	6–0, 6–0
28 January	(France) Paris	Open GDF Suez	Hard (i)	(Germany) Mona Barthel	(Italy) Sara Errani	7–5, 7–6^{(7–4)}
18 February	(United Arab Emirates) Dubai	Barclays Dubai Tennis Championships	Hard	(Czech Republic) Petra Kvitová	(Italy) Sara Errani	6–2, 1–6, 6–1
1 April	(United States) Charleston	Family Circle Cup	Clay	(United States) Serena Williams	(Serbia) Jelena Janković	3–6, 6–0, 6–2
22 April	(Germany) Stuttgart	Porsche Tennis Grand Prix	Clay (i)	(Russia) Maria Sharapova	(China) Li Na	6-4, 6-3
20 May	(Belgium) Brussels	Brussels Open	Clay	(Estonia) Kaia Kanepi	(China) Peng Shuai	6–2, 7–5
17 June	(United Kingdom) Eastbourne	Aegon International	Grass	(Russia) Elena Vesnina	(United States) Jamie Hampton	6–2, 6–1
22 July	(United States) Stanford	Bank of the West Classic	Hard	(Slovakia) Dominika Cibulková	(Poland) Agnieszka Radwańska	3–6, 6–4, 6–4
29 July	(United States) Carlsbad	Southern California Open	Hard	(Australia) Samantha Stosur	(Belarus) Victoria Azarenka	6–2, 6–3
19 August	(United States) New Haven	New Haven Open at Yale	Hard	(Romania) Simona Halep	(Czech Republic) Petra Kvitová	6–2, 6–2
14 October	(Russia) Moscow	Kremlin Cup	Hard (i)	(Romania) Simona Halep	(Australia) Samantha Stosur	7–6^{(7–1)}, 6–2
Year-End Championship
22 October	(Turkey) Istanbul	WTA Tour Championships	Hard (i)	(United States) Serena Williams	(China) Li Na	2–6, 6–3, 6–0

=== WTA International tournaments ===
The WTA International Tournaments were 31 of the tennis tournaments.

== Grand Slam events ==
=== Australian Open ===
The 2013 Australian Open was a tennis tournament played on Hardcourt (Plexicushion). It was the 101st edition of the Australian Open, and the first Grand Slam event of the year. It took place in Melbourne Park in Melbourne, Australia from January 14 to January 27, 2013.

All four of the main events in singles and same-sex doubles were won by the top seeds—Novak Djokovic in men's singles, Victoria Azarenka in women's singles, Bob and Mike Bryan in men's doubles, and Sara Errani and Roberta Vinci in women's doubles. This year's Australian Open was the first Grand Slam event since that tournament's 2004 edition in which the women's singles and doubles were won by the top seeds, and the first Grand Slam event since the 1997 Wimbledon Championships in which the men's and women's singles and doubles were all won by the top seeds.

Category	Champion(s)	Finalist(s)	Score in the final
Men's singles	(Serbia) Novak Djokovic	(United Kingdom) Andy Murray	6–7^{(2–7)}, 7–6^{(7–3)}, 6–3, 6–2
Women's singles	(Belarus) Victoria Azarenka	(China) Li Na	4–6, 6–4, 6–3
Men's doubles	(United States) Bob Bryan (United States) Mike Bryan	(Netherlands) Robin Haase (Netherlands) Igor Sijsling	6–3, 6–4
Women's doubles	(Italy) Sara Errani (Italy) Roberta Vinci	(Australia) Ashleigh Barty (Australia) Casey Dellacqua	6–2, 3–6, 6–2
Mixed doubles	(Australia) Jarmila Gajdošová (Australia) Matthew Ebden	(Czech Republic) Lucie Hradecká (Czech Republic) František Čermák	6–3, 7–5

=== French Open ===
The 2013 French Open was a tennis tournament played on outdoor clay courts. It was the 112th edition of the French Open and the second Grand Slam event of the year. It took place at the Stade Roland Garros from 26 May to 9 June. It consisted of events for professional players in singles, doubles and mixed doubles play. Junior and wheelchair players also took part in singles and doubles events.

Rafael Nadal was the three-time defending champion in the men's singles, and won the title to become the first man to win the same Grand Slam title eight times. Maria Sharapova was the defending champion in women's singles, but lost in the final to Serena Williams.

This championship was the third time in grand slam history that two multiple slam sets were accomplished in two different disciplines, and that was Serena Williams in Women's Singles, and her fellow countrymen Bob and Mike Bryan in Men's Doubles. At the 1969 US Open, Rod Laver won his multiple slam set in Men's Singles, and his fellow countryman Ken Rosewall did in Men's Doubles. At the 2012 French Open, Mahesh Bhupathi won a multiple slam set in Mixed Doubles, and Esther Vergeer won her multiple slam set in Women's Wheelchair Doubles.

Category	Champion(s)	Finalist(s)	Score in the final
Men's singles	(Spain) Rafael Nadal	(Spain) David Ferrer	6–3, 6–2, 6–3
Women's singles	(United States) Serena Williams	(Russia) Maria Sharapova	6–4, 6–4
Men's doubles	(United States) Bob Bryan (United States) Mike Bryan	(France) Michaël Llodra (France) Nicolas Mahut	6–4, 4–6, 7–6^{(7–4)}
Women's doubles	(Russia) Ekaterina Makarova (Russia) Elena Vesnina	(Italy) Sara Errani (Italy) Roberta Vinci	5–7, 2–6
Mixed doubles	(Czech Republic) Lucie Hradecká (Czech Republic) František Čermák	(France) Kristina Mladenovic (Canada) Daniel Nestor	1–6, 6–4, [10–6]

=== Wimbledon Championships ===
The 2013 Wimbledon Championships was a tennis tournament played on grass courts. It was the 127th championships of the Wimbledon Championships and the third Grand Slam event of the year. It took place at the All England Lawn Tennis and Croquet Club in Wimbledon, London, United Kingdom, from 24 June to 7 July 2013.

Roger Federer and Serena Williams were the defending champions in singles events, but neither was able to repeat their success. This marked the first time since 1927 in which both defending champions were eliminated before the quarter-finals.

Andy Murray became the first man from Great Britain to win the singles title since Fred Perry in 1936. Marion Bartoli won the women's singles title. Bob and Mike Bryan completed the "Bryan Slam" and became the first team to hold all four Grand Slams and the Olympic Gold at the same time.

Category	Champion(s)	Finalist(s)	Score in the final
Men's singles	(United Kingdom) Andy Murray	(Serbia) Novak Djokovic	6–4, 7–5, 6–4
Women's singles	(France) Marion Bartoli	(Germany) Sabine Lisicki	6–1, 6–4
Men's doubles	(United States) Bob Bryan (United States) Mike Bryan	(Croatia) Ivan Dodig (Brazil) Marcelo Melo	3–6, 6–3, 6–4, 6–4
Women's doubles	(Chinese Taipei) Hsieh Su-wei (China) Peng Shuai	(Australia) Ashleigh Barty (Australia) Casey Dellacqua	7–6^{(7–1)}, 6–1
Mixed doubles	(Canada) Daniel Nestor (France) Kristina Mladenovic	(Brazil) Bruno Soares (United States) Lisa Raymond	5–7, 6–2, 8–6

=== US Open ===
The 2013 US Open was a tennis tournament played on outdoor hard courts. It was the 133rd edition of the US Open and the final fourth Grand Slam event of the year. It took place at the USTA Billie Jean King National Tennis Center, and ran from August 26 to September 9.

Category	Champion(s)	Finalist(s)	Score in the final
Men's singles	(Spain) Rafael Nadal	(Serbia) Novak Djokovic	6–2, 3–6, 6–4, 6–1
Women's singles	(United States) Serena Williams	(Belarus) Victoria Azarenka	7–5, 6–7^{(6–8)}, 6–1
Men's doubles	(India) Leander Paes (Czech Republic) Radek Štěpánek	(Austria) Alexander Peya (Brazil) Bruno Soares	6–1, 6–3
Women's doubles	(Czech Republic) Andrea Hlaváčková (Czech Republic) Lucie Hradecká	(Australia) Ashleigh Barty (Australia) Casey Dellacqua	6–7^{(4–7)}, 6–1, 6–4
Mixed doubles	(Czech Republic) Andrea Hlaváčková (Belarus) Max Mirnyi	(United States) Abigail Spears (Mexico) Santiago González	7–6^{(7–5)}, 6–3

== Team events ==
=== Hopman Cup ===
Hopman Cup XXV Champions
Spain

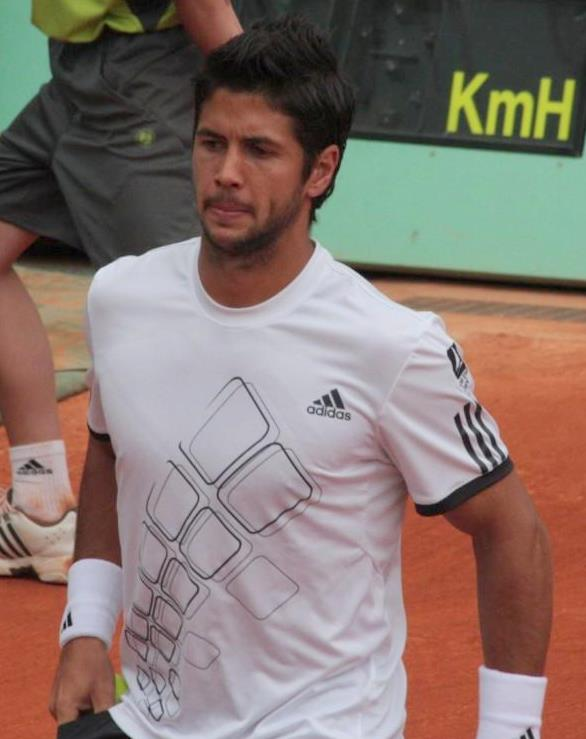
Fernando Verdasco

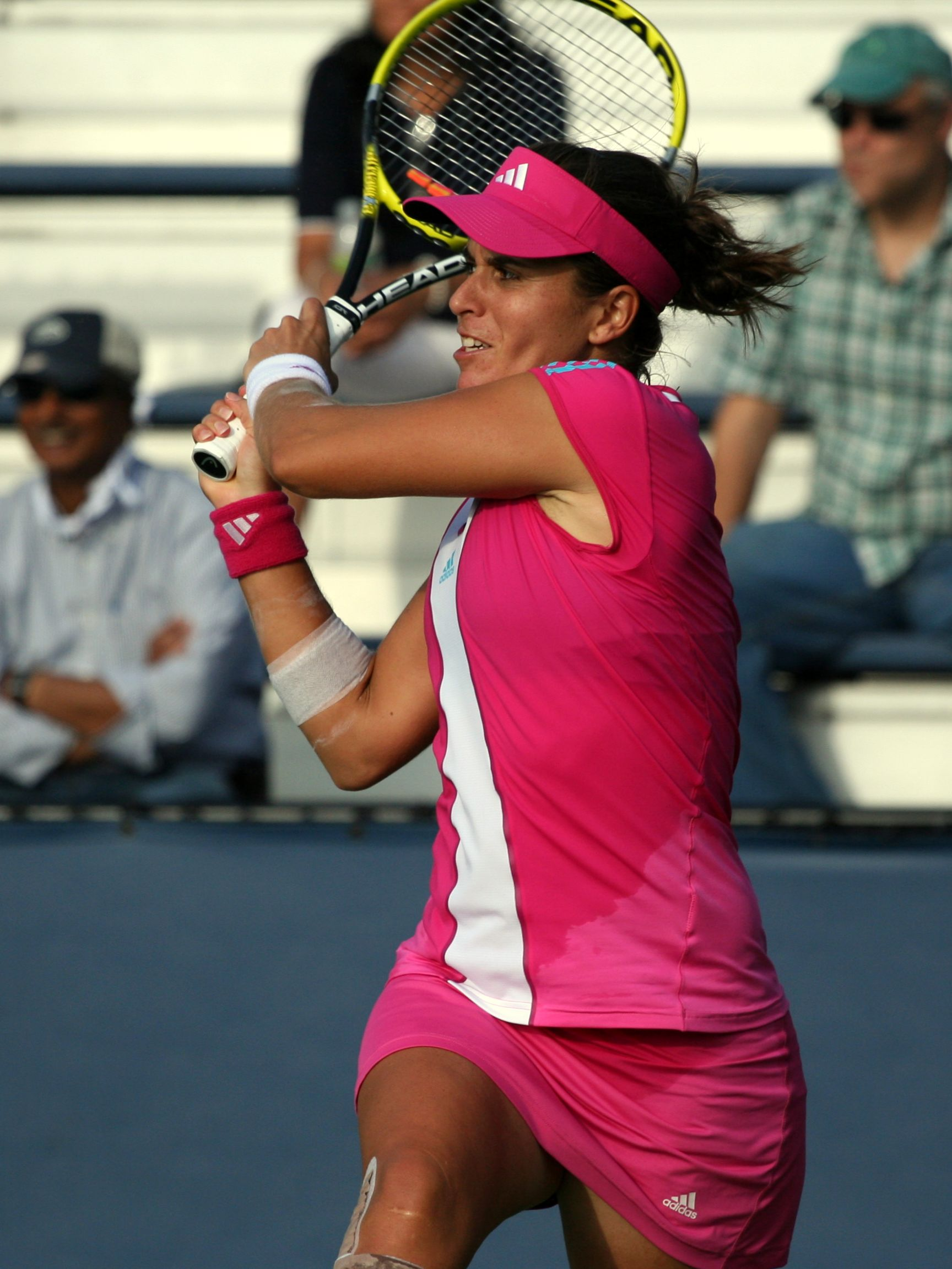
Anabel Medina Garrigues

The Hopman Cup XXV (also known as the Hyundai Hopman Cup for sponsorship purposes) was the 25th edition of the Hopman Cup tournament between nations in men's and women's tennis commenced on 29 December 2012 at the Perth Arena in Perth, Australia. Eight teams competed for the title, with two round robin groups of four, from which the top team of each group progressed to the final. Czech Republic, the defending champions, decided not to defend their title.

The 2013 Hopman Cup was won by Spain – Spain's fourth title, defeating Serbia in the final 2–1. Serbia won the men's singles, followed by Spain's winning of the women's singles; then the deciding mixed doubles event was won by Spain in straight sets.

- Spain – Fernando Verdasco / Anabel Medina Garrigues def. Serbia – Novak Djokovic / Ana Ivanovic.

=== Davis Cup ===
The 2013 Davis Cup (also known as the 2013 Davis Cup by BNP Paribas for sponsorship purposes) is the 102nd edition of the tournament between national teams in men's tennis.

The draw took place on 19 September 2012 in London, United Kingdom. Although, the draws for Asia/Oceania Zone Group I and Europe/Africa Zone Group II were held following the remaining play-off ties on 19–21 October 2012.

World Group Draw

First round 1–3 February
Vancouver, Canada (indoor hard)
1	Spain	2
Canada	3
Turin, Italy (indoor clay)
7	Croatia	2
Italy	3
Charleroi, Belgium (indoor clay)
4	Serbia	3
Belgium	2
Jacksonville, United States (indoor hard)
6	United States	3
Brazil	2
Rouen, France (indoor hard)
Israel	0
5	France	5
Buenos Aires, Argentina (clay)
Germany	0
3	Argentina	5
Astana, Kazakhstan (indoor clay)
Austria	1
8	Kazakhstan	3
Geneva, Switzerland (indoor hard)
Switzerland	2
2	Czech Republic	3

Quarterfinals; 5–7 April
Vancouver, Canada (indoor hard)
Canada	3
Italy	1
Boise, United States (indoor hard)
4	Serbia	3
6	United States	1
Buenos Aires, Argentina (clay)
5	France	2
3	Argentina	3
Astana, Kazakhstan (indoor clay)
8	Kazakhstan	1
2	Czech Republic	3

Semifinals; 13–15 September
Belgrade, Serbia (indoor clay)
Canada	2
4	Serbia	3
Prague, Czech Republic (indoor hard)
3	Argentina	2
2	Czech Republic	3

Final; 15–17 November
Belgrade, Serbia (indoor hard)
4	Serbia	2
2	Czech Republic	3

=== Fed Cup ===
The 2013 Fed Cup (also known as the 2013 Fed Cup by BNP Paribas for sponsorship purposes) was the 51st edition of the most important tournament between national teams in women's tennis. The final took place on 2–3 November. The draw took place on 6 June 2012 in Paris, France.

World Group Draw

Quarterfinals; 9–10 February
Ostrava, Czech Republic (Indoor hard)
1	Czech Republic	4
Australia	0
Rimini, Italy (Indoor clay)
United States	2
3	Italy	3
Moscow, Russia (Indoor hard)
4	Russia	3
Japan	2
Niš, Serbia (Indoor hard)
Slovakia	3
2	Serbia	2

Semifinals; 20–21 April
Palermo, Italy (Outdoor clay)
1	Czech Republic	1
3	Italy	3
Moscow, Russia (Indoor clay)
4	Russia	3
Slovakia	2

Final; 2–3 November
Cagliari, Italy (Outdoor clay)
3	Italy	4
4	Russia	0

== Retirements ==
Following is a list of notable players (winners of a main tour title, and/or part of the ATP or WTA rankings Top 100 (singles) or Top 50 (doubles) for at least one week) who announced their retirement from professional tennis, became inactive (after not playing for more than 52 weeks), or were permanently banned from playing, during the 2013 season:

- (Hungary) Ágnes Szávay
- (Latvia) Anastasija Sevastova
- (Russia) Anna Chakvetadze
- (United Kingdom) Anne Keothavong
- (United Kingdom) Elena Baltacha
- (Netherlands) Esther Vergeer
- (United States) James Blake
- (United States) Jill Craybas
- (France) Marion Bartoli
- (Canada) Rebecca Marino
- (Brazil) Ricardo Mello
- (France) Séverine Beltrame
- (Belgium) Xavier Malisse
- (Argentina) David Nalbandian

== International Tennis Hall of Fame ==
- Class of 2013:
  - Daphne Akhurst, player
  - James Anderson, player
  - Wilfred Baddeley, player
  - Blanche Bingley, player
  - Charlotte Cooper, player
  - Thelma Coyne Long, player
  - Martina Hingis, player
  - Cliff Drysdale, contributor
  - Charlie Pasarell, contributor
  - Ion Țiriac, contributor
