= 2025 in tennis =

This page covers all the important events in the sport of tennis in 2025. It provides the results of notable tournaments throughout the year on both the ATP and WTA Tours, the Davis Cup, and the Billie Jean King Cup.

== ITF ==
=== Grand Slam events ===
Category	Championship	Champions	Finalists	Score in the final
Men's singles	Australian Open	(Italy) Jannik Sinner	(Germany) Alexander Zverev	6–3, 7–6^{(7–4)}, 6–3
Men's singles	French Open	(Spain) Carlos Alcaraz	(Italy) Jannik Sinner	4–6, 6–7^{(4–7)}, 6–4, 7–6^{(7–3)}, 7–6^{(10–2)}
Men's singles	Wimbledon	(Italy) Jannik Sinner	(Spain) Carlos Alcaraz	4–6, 6–4, 6–4, 6–4
Men's singles	US Open	(Spain) Carlos Alcaraz	(Italy) Jannik Sinner	6–2, 3–6, 6–1, 6–4

Category	Championship	Champions	Finalists	Score in the final
Women's singles	Australian Open	(United States) Madison Keys	Aryna Sabalenka	6–3, 2–6, 7–5
Women's singles	French Open	(United States) Coco Gauff	Aryna Sabalenka	6–7^{(5–7)}, 6–2, 6–4
Women's singles	Wimbledon	(Poland) Iga Świątek	(United States) Amanda Anisimova	6–0, 6–0
Women's singles	US Open	Aryna Sabalenka	(United States) Amanda Anisimova	6–3, 7–6^{(7–3)}

Category	Championship	Champions	Finalists	Score in the final
Men's doubles	Australian Open	(Finland) Harri Heliövaara (United Kingdom) Henry Patten	(Italy) Simone Bolelli (Italy) Andrea Vavassori	6–7^{(16–18)}, 7–6^{(7–5)}, 6–3
Men's doubles	French Open	(Spain) Marcel Granollers (Argentina) Horacio Zeballos	(United Kingdom) Joe Salisbury (United Kingdom) Neal Skupski	6–0, 6–7^{(5–7)}, 7–5
Men's doubles	Wimbledon	(United Kingdom) Julian Cash (United Kingdom) Lloyd Glasspool	(Australia) Rinky Hijikata (Netherlands) David Pel	6–2, 7–6^{(7–3)}
Men's doubles	US Open	(Spain) Marcel Granollers (Argentina) Horacio Zeballos	(United Kingdom) Neal Skupski (United Kingdom) Joe Salisbury	3–6, 7–6^{(7–4)}, 7–5

Category	Championship	Champions	Finalists	Score in the final
Women's doubles	Australian Open	(Czech Republic) Kateřina Siniaková (United States) Taylor Townsend	(Chinese Taipei) Hsieh Su-wei (Latvia) Jeļena Ostapenko	6–2, 6–7^{(4–7)}, 6–3
Women's doubles	French Open	(Italy) Sara Errani (Italy) Jasmine Paolini	(Kazakhstan) Anna Danilina (Serbia) Aleksandra Krunić	6–4, 2–6, 6–1
Women's doubles	Wimbledon	Veronika Kudermetova (Belgium) Elise Mertens	(Chinese Taipei) Hsieh Su-wei (Latvia) Jeļena Ostapenko	3–6, 6–2, 6–4
Women's doubles	US Open	(New Zealand) Erin Routliffe (Canada) Gabriela Dabrowski	(United States) Taylor Townsend (Czech Republic) Kateřina Siniaková	6–4, 6–4

Category	Championship	Champions	Finalists	Score in the final
Mixed doubles	Australian Open	(Australia) Olivia Gadecki (Australia) John Peers	(Australia) Kimberly Birrell (Australia) John-Patrick Smith	3–6, 6–4, [10–6]
Mixed doubles	French Open	(Italy) Sara Errani (Italy) Andrea Vavassori	(United States) Taylor Townsend (United States) Evan King	6–4, 6–2
Mixed doubles	Wimbledon	(Netherlands) Sem Verbeek (Czech Republic) Kateřina Siniaková	(United Kingdom) Joe Salisbury (Brazil) Luisa Stefani	7–6^{(7–3)}, 7–6^{(7–3)}
Mixed doubles	US Open	(Italy) Sara Errani (Italy) Andrea Vavassori	(Poland) Iga Świątek (Norway) Casper Ruud	6–3, 5–7, [10–6]

== Davis Cup ==
Quarterfinals
1	Italy	2
Austria	0
3	France	0
Belgium	2
Spain	2
4	Czech Republic	1
Argentina	1
2	Germany	2

Semifinals
1	Italy	2
Belgium	0
Spain	2
2	Germany	1

Final
1	Italy	2
Spain	0

== Billie Jean King Cup ==
Quarterfinals
1	Italy	2
China	0
4	Spain	0
Ukraine	2
Kazakhstan	1
3	United States	2
Japan	0
2	Great Britain	2

Semifinals
1	Italy	2
Ukraine	1
3	United States	2
2	Great Britain	0

Finals
1	Italy	2
3	United States	0

== ATP/WTA ==
=== Men's singles ===
Championship	Champions	Finalists	Score in the final
Indian Wells Masters	(United Kingdom) Jack Draper	(Denmark) Holger Rune	6–2, 6–2
Miami Open	(Czech Republic) Jakub Menšík	(Serbia) Novak Djokovic	7–6^{(7–4)}, 7–6^{(7–4)}
Monte-Carlo Masters	(Spain) Carlos Alcaraz	(Italy) Lorenzo Musetti	3–6, 6–1, 6–0
Madrid Open	(Norway) Casper Ruud	(United Kingdom) Jack Draper	7–5, 3–6, 6–4
Italian Open	(Spain) Carlos Alcaraz	(Italy) Jannik Sinner	7–6^{(7–5)}, 6–1
Canadian Open	(United States) Ben Shelton	Karen Khachanov	6–7^{(5–7)}, 6–4, 7–6^{(7–3)}
Cincinnati Open	(Spain) Carlos Alcaraz	(Italy) Jannik Sinner	5–0 (ret.)
Shanghai Masters	(Monaco) Valentin Vacherot	(France) Arthur Rinderknech	4–6, 6–3, 6–3
Paris Masters	(Italy) Jannik Sinner	(Canada) Félix Auger-Aliassime	6–4, 7–6^{(7–4)}

=== Men's doubles ===
Championship	Champions	Finalists	Score in the final
Indian Wells Masters	(El Salvador) Marcelo Arévalo (Croatia) Mate Pavić	(United States) Sebastian Korda (Australia) Jordan Thompson	6–3, 6–4
Miami Open	(El Salvador) Marcelo Arévalo (Croatia) Mate Pavić	(United Kingdom) Julian Cash (United Kingdom) Lloyd Glasspool	7–6^{(7–3)}, 6–3
Monte-Carlo Masters	(Monaco) Romain Arneodo (France) Manuel Guinard	(United Kingdom) Julian Cash (United Kingdom) Lloyd Glasspool	1–6, 7–6^{(10–8)}, [10–8]
Madrid Open	(Spain) Marcel Granollers (Argentina) Horacio Zeballos	(El Salvador) Marcelo Arévalo (Croatia) Mate Pavić	6–4, 6–4
Italian Open	(El Salvador) Marcelo Arévalo (Croatia) Mate Pavić	(France) Sadio Doumbia (France) Fabien Reboul	6–4, 6–7^{(6–8)}, [13–11]
Canadian Open	(United Kingdom) Julian Cash (United Kingdom) Lloyd Glasspool	(United Kingdom) Joe Salisbury (United Kingdom) Neal Skupski	6–3, 6–7^{(5–7)}, [13–11]
Cincinnati Masters	(Croatia) Nikola Mektić (United States) Rajeev Ram	(Italy) Lorenzo Musetti (Italy) Lorenzo Sonego	4–6, 6–3, [10–5]
Shanghai Masters	(Germany) Kevin Krawietz (Germany) Tim Pütz	(Sweden) André Göransson (United States) Alex Michelsen	6–4, 6–4
Paris Masters	(Finland) Harri Heliövaara (United Kingdom) Henry Patten	(United Kingdom) Julian Cash (United Kingdom) Lloyd Glasspool	6–3, 6–4

=== Women's singles ===
Championship	Champions	Finalists	Score in the final
Qatar Open	(United States) Amanda Anisimova	(Latvia) Jelena Ostapenko	6–4, 6–3
Dubai Championships	Mirra Andreeva	(Denmark) Clara Tauson	7–6^{(7–1)}, 6–1
Indian Wells Open	Mirra Andreeva	Aryna Sabalenka	2–6, 6–4, 6–3
Miami Open	Aryna Sabalenka	(United States) Jessica Pegula	7–5, 6–2
Madrid Open	Aryna Sabalenka	(United States) Coco Gauff	6–3, 7–6^{(7–3)}
Italian Open	(Italy) Jasmine Paolini	(United States) Coco Gauff	6–4, 6–2
Canadian Open	(Canada) Victoria Mboko	(Japan) Naomi Osaka	2–6, 6–4, 6–1
Cincinnati Open	(Poland) Iga Świątek	(Italy) Jasmine Paolini	7–5, 6–4
China Open	(United States) Amanda Anisimova	(Czech Republic) Linda Nosková	6–0, 2–6, 6–2
Wuhan Open	(United States) Coco Gauff	(United States) Jessica Pegula	6–4, 7–5

=== Women's doubles ===
Championship	Champions	Finalists	Score in the final
Qatar Open	(Italy) Sara Errani (Italy) Jasmine Paolini	(China) Xinyu Jiang (Chinese Taipei) Fang-Hsien Wu	7–5, 7–6^{(12–10)}
Dubai Championships	(Czech Republic) Kateřina Siniaková (United States) Taylor Townsend	(Chinese Taipei) Hsieh Su-wei (Latvia) Jelena Ostapenko	7–6^{(7–5),} 6–4
Indian Wells Open	(United States) Asia Muhammad (Netherlands) Demi Schuurs	(Slovakia) Tereza Mihalíková (United Kingdom) Olivia Nicholls	6–2, 7–6^{(7–4)}
Miami Open	Mirra Andreeva; Diana Shnaider	(Spain) Cristina Bucșa (Japan) Miyu Kato	6–3, 6–7^{(5–7)}, [10–2]
Madrid Open	(Romania) Sorana Cîrstea; Anna Kalinskaya	Veronika Kudermetova (Belgium) Elise Mertens	6–7^{(10–12)}, 6–2, [12–10]
Italian Open	(Italy) Sara Errani (Italy) Jasmine Paolini	Veronika Kudermetova (Belgium) Elise Mertens	6–4, 7–5
Canadian Open	(United States) Coco Gauff (United States) McCartney Kessler	(United States) Taylor Townsend (China) Zhang Shuai	6–4, 1–6, [13–11]
Cincinnati Open	(Canada) Gabriela Dabrowski (New Zealand) Erin Routliffe	(China) Guo Hanyu; Alexandra Panova	6–4, 6–3
China Open	(Italy) Sara Errani (Italy) Jasmine Paolini	(Japan) Miyu Kato (Hungary) Fanny Stollár	6–7^{(1–7)}, 6–3, [10–2]
Wuhan Open	(Australia) Storm Hunter (Czech Republic) Kateřina Siniaková	(Kazakhstan) Anna Danilina (Serbia) Aleksandra Krunić	6–3, 6–2
