= 2012 in tennis =

This page covers all the important events in the sport of tennis in 2012. Primarily, it provides the results of notable tournaments throughout the year on both the ATP and WTA Tours, the Davis Cup, and the Fed Cup.

== Important Events ==
=== January ===
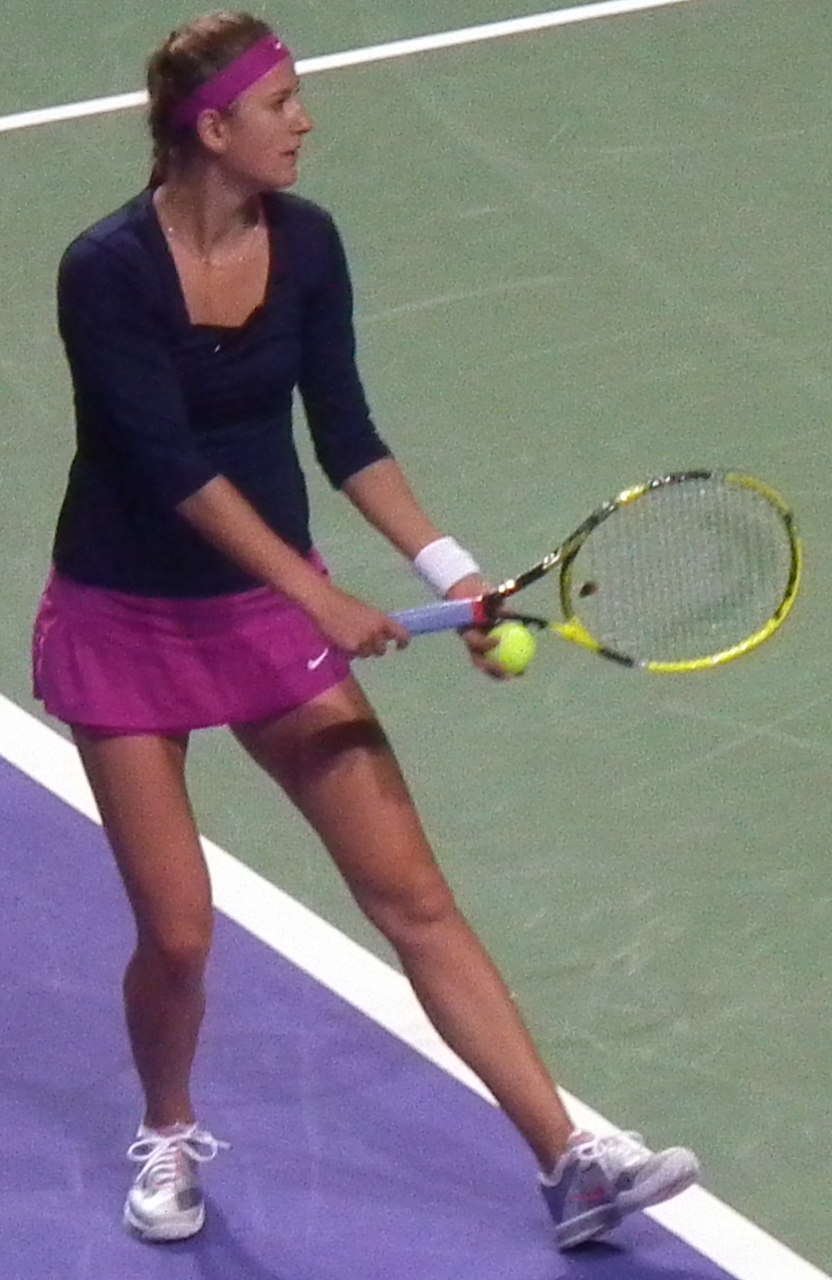
Victoria Azarenka.

- The Czech Republic has won the Hyundai Hopman Cup for the second time with top seeds Petra Kvitová and Tomáš Berdych going right through the week unbeaten in singles ending with straight-set singles victories in the final inside the Burswood Dome, Perth on January 7 against France's Marion Bartoli and Richard Gasquet. The mixed-doubles match was not played because the championship was decided in singles.
- Andy Murray began the season by playing in the Brisbane International making his debut appearance at the tournament as the top seed in singles and also winning the title against Alexandr Dolgopolov in the final.
- Estonian tennis player Kaia Kanepi won the Brisbane International by defeating Daniela Hantuchová in the final.

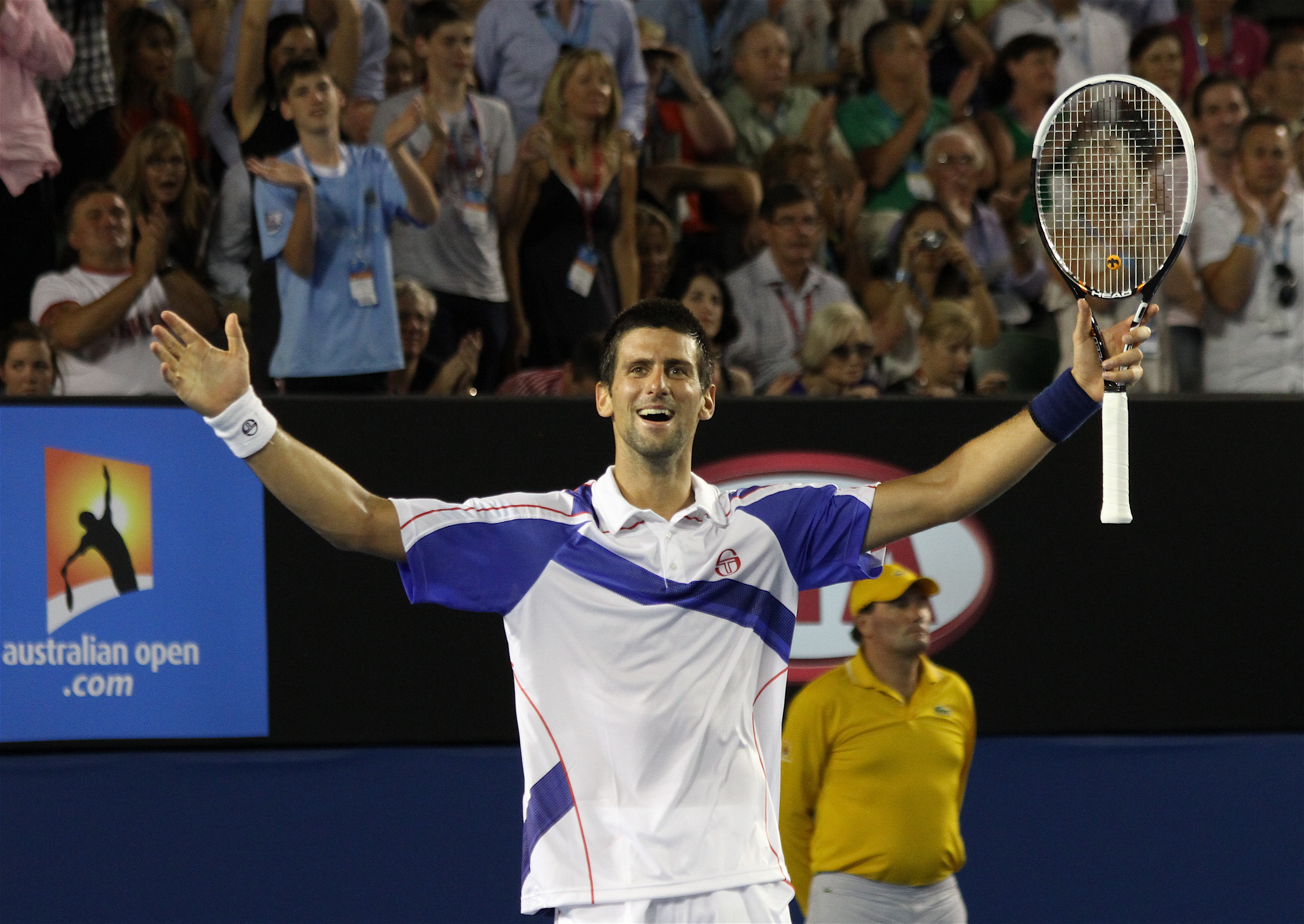
Novak Djokovic.

- Milos Raonic wins Aircel Chennai Open in Chennai, India, overcomes Janko Tipsarević in the final. Raonic did not drop serve during the tournament, becoming the first player to do so since Roger Federer at the 2008 Gerry Weber Open.
- Zheng Jie began the season by winning the ASB Classic over Flavia Pennetta as she retired due to injury.
- Jo-Wilfried Tsonga, began his 2012 season at the Qatar ExxonMobil Open in Doha, as the #3 seed of the tournament. After Roger Federer announced an unexpected withdrawal from the tournament due to a back problem, Tsonga had a walkover to the final where he defeated Gaël Monfils to become the champion of the Qatar ExxonMobil Open.
- Finland's best player ever, Jarkko Nieminen won the Apia International Sydney against Julien Benneteau
- Victoria Azarenka won her first tournament of the year by winning Apia International Sydney defeating the defending champion Li Na.
- David Ferrer won his first tournament of 2012 in Auckland, New Zealand at the Heineken Open over Olivier Rochus.
- Mona Barthel achieved her highest singles ranking of world no. 44 in singles on 16 January 2012 by defeating top seed Yanina Wickmayer in the final of Moorilla Hobart International claiming her first WTA Tour title. With this win, Mona became the first qualifier since September 2010 to win a WTA tournament.
- Victoria Azarenka has claimed her first Grand Slam title, becoming the first Belarusian player to win a Grand Slam in singles, by defeating Maria Sharapova in the Australian Open final and over took Caroline Wozniacki as the number one ranked player on the WTA Tour.

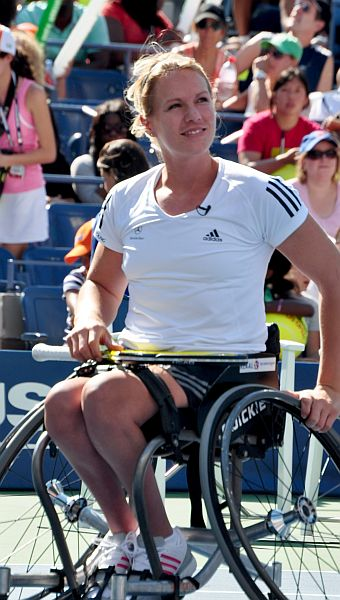
Esther Vergeer.

- For the first time of his career, Novak Djokovic will enter the season as reigning World No. 1. Novak Djokovic was the defending champion and retain the Australian Open title by winning in the final against Rafael Nadal. It was the longest match in the history of the Australian Open, and in fact, the longest ever final in Grand Slam history; clocked at 5 hours and 53 minutes. It marked the 5th Grand Slam of his career and his 3rd Australian Open. It also marked the first time that he had defended a Grand Slam title. After winning the 2012 Australian Open, Djokovic is on the edge of history, as is having an opportunity to become the first man since Rod Laver in 1969 to hold all four Grand Slams at the same time (chances of completing a Golden Slam this year.), after winning the previous two in 2011. Nadal went on to become the first player to lose three Grand Slam finals in a row in the Open Era.
- Leander Paes completed a Career Grand Slam while Radek Štěpánek won his first ever Slam after winning the Australian Open in Men's Doubles.
- The unseeded Russian pair Svetlana Kuznetsova and Vera Zvonareva defeated the all Italian pair of Sara Errani and Roberta Vinci in Australian Open in Women's Doubles.
- Bethanie Mattek-Sands and Horia Tecău won the Australian Open in Mixed Doubles tournament by defeating Elena Vesnina and Leander Paes. Mattek-Sands was the only American, man or woman, to win a title at the Australian Open.
- World number one wheel chair tennis player, Esther Vergeer defended her title against Aniek van Koot in the final of Australian Open in Wheelchair women's singles.

=== February ===
- In the first round of Davis Cup, Spain and the United States won all five matches against their respective opponents, Kazakhstan and Switzerland. France def. Canada, the Czech Republic def. Italy, and Argentina def. Germany by 4–1. Austria and Croatia won 3–2 against Russia and Japan, respectively.
- During the week of February 13, Roger Federer defeated Juan Martín del Potro to win the ABN AMRO World Tennis Tournament, a 500 event on the ATP World Tour held in Rotterdam, Netherlands.
- After his defeat in Rotterdam, del Potro played the next week in Marseille, France, winning his 1st title of the year.
- The Regions Morgan Keegan Championships and the Memphis International, took place from February 17 to February 26. The Regions Morgan Keegan Championships was an ATP World Tour 500 series event, and the Memphis International was a WTA Tour International event. In the final, Jürgen Melzer defeated Milos Raonic, 7–5, 7–6(4).
- The 2012 Dubai Tennis Championships, an ATP World Tour 500 series event and WTA Tour Premier event, was held over two weeks in the United Arab Emirates. The women's event, took place between February 20 to February 25, and was won by 5th seed Agnieszka Radwańska, after she defeated Julia Görges in the final. The men's event, took place a week later, from February 27 to March 3, 2012. Roger Federer, seeded second, defeated Andy Murray, 7–5, 6–2, to take home his fifth Dubai title. Murray defeated ATP world No.1 and three-time defending champion Novak Djokovic in the semifinals.
- During the week of February 27, the Abierto Mexicano Telcel, also an ATP World Tour 500 event and a WTA International event was held in Acapulco, Mexico. David Ferrer, who was ranked 5th but seeded 1st at the event, won the final over Fernando Verdasco, 6–1, 6–2.

=== March ===
- The BNP Paribas Open, the first ATP World Tour Masters 1000 event and WTA Premier Mandatory event of the year, took place in Indian Wells, United States from March 5 to March 12. The men's singles event was won by Roger Federer who defeated John Isner, 7–6(7), 6–3.Defending champion Novak Djokovic lost in the semifinals to Isner. The women's singles event was won by Victoria Azarenka who defeated Maria Sharapova, 6–2, 6–3.
- From March 21 to March 26, the second ATP World Tour Masters 1000 event and WTA Premier Mandatory event took place in Miami, United States. The men's singles title was won by defending champion Novak Djokovic who defeated Andy Murray, 6–1, 7–6(4).

=== June ===
- On June 30, Andy Murray beat Marcos Baghdatis in four-sets, setting the then record for the latest finish at Wimbeldon of 23:02 BST. While, Yaroslava Shvedova became the first player to achieve a golden set in a Grand Slam tournament.

=== July ===
- By beating Angelique Kerber, Agnieszka Radwańska became the first Pole to reach a Grand Slam singles final in the Open Era.However, she would go on to lose the final against Serena Williams, who won her fifth Wimbeldon singles title.
- The Williams sisters win their fifth doubles title by beating the sixth seeds, Andrea Hlaváčková and Lucie Hradecká.
- Andy Murray beat Jo-Wilfred Tsonga in the semifinals to become the first Brit to reach the Wimbeldon finals in 74 years, where he would lose to Roger Federer, 4-6, 7-5, 6-3, 6-4. With his seventh singles Wimbeldon title, Federer would tie the record of single titles with Pete Sampras and William Renshaw.
- In the men's doubles, Jonathan Marray and Frederik Nielsen were the first wild cards to win the title. Murray was the first Brit to win the title in the Open Era, while, Nielsen was the first Dane to win a Grand Slam title in the Open Era.
- The first WTA Premier event of July was the Bank of the West Classic in Stanford, California, which was held from the 9-15 July. In the final, Serena Williams defeated CoCo Vandeweghe, 7-5, 6-3.
- In Carlsbad, California was the Mercury Insurance Open, which was a WTA Premier level tournament held from 16-22 July. Second-seeded Dominika Cibulková defeated Marion Bartoli, 6-1, 7-5.
- The 106th edition of the International German Open took place from 16 to 22 July. Juan Mónaco won the ATP World Tour 500 series event by defeating Tommy Haas, 7-5, 6-4.
- In the second round of the 2012 Summer Olympics, Tsonga beat Milos Raonic, 6-3, 3-6, 25-23, setting the record for the longest match at the Olympics by number of games.

=== August ===
- Running concurrently with 2012 Summer Olympics, the Citi Open was the seventh ATP World Tour 500 event of the year. Tommy Haas lost a second ATP final in a row after being defeated by Alexandr Dolgopolov, 7–6^{(9–7)}, 4–6, 1–6.
- Serena Williams defeated Maria Sharapova, 6-0, 6-1, to win the gold medal achieving a career Golden Slam in singles. Serena became the first player to complete both a singles and doubles career Golden Slam.
- Serena and Venus Williams beat Andrea Hlaváčková and Lucie Hradecká, a rematch of the Wimbeldon finals, 6-4, 6-4. Thus, completing a second doubles career Golden Slam and becoming the first four-time Olympic gold medalists in tennis. Additionally, Serena became the third woman to achieve a Double Crown at the Olympics after Helen Wills and her sister, Venus.
- Andy Murray blocked Roger Federer from achieving a career Golden Slam by beating him, 6-2, 6-1, 6-4, to win the gold medal at the 2012 Summer Olympics. Murray was the first medal for GB in the men's singles since 1908. Del Porto achieved Argentina's first medal in the men's singles with his 2-set win over Novak Djokovic.
- In the men's doubles, the Bryan Brothers, Bob and Mike, achieved their career Golden Slam by defeating Michaël Llodra and Jo-Wilfred Tsonga, 6–4, 7–6^{(7–2)}.
- The Rogers Cup, an ATP World Tour Masters 1000 and WTA Premier 5 event, was held from 6-13 August. In the men's singles final, Novak Djokovic defeated Richard Gasquets 6-3, 6-2, while in the women's final, Petra Kvitová beat Li Na, 7-5, 2-6, 6-3.
- During the week of August 13th, Roger Federer won his record fifth Cincinnati Masters title by defeating Novak Djokovic, 6–0, 7–6^{(9–7}^{)}. At this ATP Masters 1000 event, Federer became the first player to win a Masters event without having their serve brokem or losing a set. In the women's singles, Li Na defeated Angelique Kerber, 1-6, 6-3, 6-1, in the WTA Premier 5 event.
- Petra Kvitová won her second title of the month by defeating Maria Kirilenko in 2 sets at WTA Premier event, New Haven Open.
- August 27th marked the start of the US Open.

=== November ===
- On November 12, Novak Djokovic won the singles title of the Barclays ATP World Tour Finals by defeating defending champion Roger Federer 7–6^{(8–6)}, 7–5 in the final. Djokovic's win was his 6th title of the year and his 2nd win at the event having won back in 2008.
- On November 12, Marcel Granollers and Marc López defeated Mahesh Bhupathi and Rohan Bopanna 7–5, 3–6, [10–3] in the final of the doubles draw of the Barclays ATP World Tour Finals.
- On November 18, the Czech Republic became champions of the 2012 Davis Cup World Group after defeating Spain 3–2 in the final held at the O_{2} Arena in Prague from the 16th to the 18th of November. The Davis Cup title was the Czech Republic's first as an independent nation.

=== The entire year ===
The 2012 Australian Open was held from January 16 to January 29. Defending champion Novak Djokovic defeated Rafael Nadal, 5–7, 6–4, 6–2, 6–7(5), 7–5, to win the longest final in history. The second Grand Slam event of the year was won by Nadal who defeated Djokovic 6–4, 6–3, 2–6, 7–5 to win a record seventh French Open title. At Wimbledon, Roger Federer would equal this record, held by Nadal and Pete Sampras, by winning the final 4–6, 7–5, 6–3, 6–4 against Andy Murray. Murray went on to win the last Grand Slam event of the year, by defeating defending champion Djokovic, 7–6(10), 7–5, 2–6, 3–6, 6–2. At the ATP World Tour Finals, Djokovic won against defending champion Federer, 7–6(6), 7–5.

== ITF ==
=== Grand Slam events ===
==== Australian Open ====
The 2012 Australian Open is a tennis tournament that is taking place in Melbourne Park in Melbourne, Australia from January 16 to January 29, 2012. It is the 100th edition of the Australian Open, and the first Grand Slam event of the year.

The 2012 Australian Open will take place from the January 2012 and is to be held at Melbourne Park. The Men's singles will be staged for the 100th time. There have been different 59 previous winners and the 100th staging of the event was marked by a special coin and the 2012 Champion will receive a special medallion. The tournament will also mark 50 years since Rod Laver won his first Grand Slam. For the first time Hawk eye will be used on the Margaret Court Arena, while Ken Fletcher will be inducted into the Australian Tennis Hall of Fame.

Category	Champion(s)	Finalist(s)	Score in the final
Men's singles	(Serbia) Novak Djokovic	(Spain) Rafael Nadal	5–7, 6–4, 6–2, 6–7^{(5–7)}, 7–5
Women's singles	(Belarus) Victoria Azarenka	(Russia) Maria Sharapova	6–3, 6–0
Men's doubles	(India) Leander Paes (Czech Republic) Radek Štěpánek	(United States) Bob Bryan (United States) Mike Bryan	7–6, 6–2
Women's doubles	(Russia) Svetlana Kuznetsova (Russia) Vera Zvonareva	(Italy) Sara Errani (Italy) Roberta Vinci	5–7, 6–4, 6–3
Mixed doubles	(United States) Bethanie Mattek-Sands (Romania) Horia Tecău	(Russia) Elena Vesnina (India) Leander Paes	6–3, 5–7, [10–3]

==== French Open ====
The French Open (French: Les internationaux de France de Roland-Garros or Tournoi de Roland-Garros, IPA: [ʁɔlɑ̃ ɡaʁos], named after the famous French aviator Roland Garros) is a major tennis tournament held over two weeks between late May and early June in Paris, France, at the Stade Roland Garros. It is the premier clay court tennis tournament in the world and the second of the four annual Grand Slam tournaments – the other three are the Australian Open, US Open and Wimbledon. Roland Garros is the only Grand Slam held on clay and ends the spring clay court season.

Category	Champion(s)	Finalist(s)	Score in the final
Men's singles	(Spain) Rafael Nadal	(Serbia) Novak Djokovic	6–4, 6–3, 2–6, 7–5
Women's singles	(Russia) Maria Sharapova	(Italy) Sara Errani	6–3, 6–2
Men's doubles	(Belarus) Max Mirnyi (Canada) Daniel Nestor	(United States) Bob Bryan (United States) Mike Bryan	6–4, 6–4
Women's doubles	(Italy) Sara Errani (Italy) Roberta Vinci	(Russia) Maria Kirilenko (Russia) Nadia Petrova	4–6, 6–4, 6–2
Mixed doubles	(India) Sania Mirza (India) Mahesh Bhupathi	(Poland) Klaudia Jans-Ignacik (Mexico) Santiago González	7–6^{(7–3)}, 6–1

==== Wimbledon Championships ====
The Championships, Wimbledon, or simply Wimbledon (25 June – 8 July in 2012), is the only Major still played on grass, the game's original surface, which gave the game of lawn tennis its name. The tournament takes place over two weeks in late June and early July, culminating with the Ladies' and Gentlemen's Singles Final, scheduled respectively for the second Saturday and Sunday. Each year, five major events are contested, as well as four junior events and three invitational events.

Category	Champion(s)	Finalist(s)	Score in the final
Men's singles	(Switzerland) Roger Federer	(United Kingdom) Andy Murray	4–6, 7–5, 6–3, 6–4
Women's singles	(United States) Serena Williams	(Poland) Agnieszka Radwańska	6–1, 5–7, 6–2
Men's doubles	(United Kingdom) Jonathan Marray (Denmark) Frederik Nielsen	(Sweden) Robert Lindstedt (Romania) Horia Tecău	4–6, 6–4, 7–6^{(7–5)}, 6–7^{(5–7)}, 6–3
Women's doubles	(United States) Serena Williams (United States) Venus Williams	(Czech Republic) Andrea Hlaváčková (Czech Republic) Lucie Hradecká	7–5, 6–4
Mixed doubles	(United States) Mike Bryan (United States) Lisa Raymond	(India) Leander Paes (Russia) Elena Vesnina	6–3, 5–7, 6–4

==== US Open ====
The US Open, formally the United States Open Tennis Championships, is a hardcourt tennis tournament held annually in August and September over a two-week period (the weeks before and after Labor Day weekend).

Category	Champion(s)	Finalist(s)	Score in the final
Men's singles	(United Kingdom) Andy Murray	(Serbia) Novak Djokovic	7–6^{(12–10)}, 7–5, 2–6, 3–6, 6–2
Women's singles	(United States) Serena Williams	(Belarus) Victoria Azarenka	6–2, 2–6, 7–5
Men's doubles	(United States) Bob Bryan (United States) Mike Bryan	(India) Leander Paes (Czech Republic) Radek Štěpánek	6–3, 6–4
Women's doubles	(Italy) Sara Errani (Italy) Roberta Vinci	(Czech Republic) Andrea Hlaváčková (Czech Republic) Lucie Hradecká	6–4, 6–2
Mixed doubles	(Russia) Ekaterina Makarova (Brazil) Bruno Soares	(Czech Republic) Květa Peschke (Poland) Marcin Matkowski	6–7^{(8–10)}, 6–1, [12–10]

=== Davis Cup ===
The 2012 Davis Cup (also known as the 2012 Davis Cup by BNP Paribas for sponsorship purposes) is the 100th edition of the tournament between national teams in men's tennis.

The draw took place on 21 September 2011 in Bangkok, Thailand.

World Group Draw

- S-Seeded
- U-Unseeded
  - Choice of ground

First round 10–12 February
Oviedo, Spain
1	Spain	5
Kazakhstan	0
Wiener Neustadt, Austria
8	Russia	2
Austria	3
Vancouver, Canada
4	France	4
Canada	1
Fribourg, Switzerland
6	United States	5
Switzerland	0
Ostrava, Czech Republic
Italy	1
5	Czech Republic	4
Niš, Serbia
Sweden	1
3	Serbia	4
Miki, Japan
Japan	2
7	Croatia	3
Bamberg, Germany
Germany	1
2	Argentina	4

Quarterfinals; 6–8 April
Oropesa del Mar, Spain (clay)
1	Spain	4
Austria	1
Roquebrune-Cap-Martin, France (clay)
4	France	2
6	United States	3
Prague, Czech Republic (indoor clay)
5	Czech Republic	4
3	Serbia	1
Buenos Aires, Argentina (clay)
7	Croatia	1
2	Argentina	4

Semifinals; 14–16 September
Gijón, Spain (clay)
1	Spain	3
6	United States	1
Buenos Aires, Argentina (clay)
5	Czech Republic	3
2	Argentina	2

Final; 16–18 November
Prague, Czech Republic (indoor carpet)
1	Spain	2
5	Czech Republic	3

=== Fed Cup ===
The 2012 Fed Cup (also known as the 2012 Fed Cup by BNP Paribas for sponsorship purposes) is the 50th edition of the most important tournament between national teams in women's tennis. The final will take place on 4–5 November.

World Group Draw

- S-Seeded
- U-Unseeded
  - Choice of ground

Quarterfinals; 4–5 February
Moscow, Russia (indoor hard)
1	Russia	3
Spain	2
Charleroi, Belgium (indoor hard)
4	Belgium	2
Serbia	3
Biella, Italy (indoor clay)
3	Italy	3
Ukraine	2
Stuttgart, Germany (indoor hard)
Germany	1
2	Czech Republic	4

Semifinals; 21–22 April
Moscow, Russia (indoor clay)
1	Russia	1
Serbia	3
Ostrava, Czech Republic (indoor hard)
3	Italy	1
2	Czech Republic	4

Final; 4–5 November
Prague, Czech Republic (indoor hard)
Serbia	1
2	Czech Republic	3

== 2012 London Olympics ==
The tennis competitions of the 2012 Summer Olympics were staged at the All England Lawn Tennis and Croquet Club in Wimbledon, London, from 29 July to 5 August 2012. 172 tennis players competed in five events; singles and doubles for both men and women and for the first time since 1924 mixed doubles were officially included.

Category	Champion(s)	Finalist(s)	Score in the final
Men's singles	(United Kingdom) Andy Murray	(Switzerland) Roger Federer	6–2, 6–1, 6–4
Women's singles	(United States) Serena Williams	(Russia) Maria Sharapova	6–0, 6–1
Men's doubles	(United States) Bob Bryan (United States) Mike Bryan	(France) Michaël Llodra (France) Jo Wilfried Tsonga	6–4, 7–6^{(7–2)}
Women's doubles	(United States) Serena Williams (United States) Venus Williams	(Czech Republic) Andrea Hlaváčková (Czech Republic) Lucie Hradecká	6–4, 6–4
Mixed doubles	(Belarus) Max Mirnyi (Belarus) Victoria Azarenka	(United Kingdom) Andy Murray (United Kingdom) Laura Robson	2–6, 6–3, [10–8]

== ATP World Tour ==
The 2012 ATP World Tour is the global elite professional tennis circuit organized by the Association of Tennis Professionals (ATP) for the 2012 tennis season. The 2012 ATP World Tour calendar comprises the Grand Slam tournaments (supervised by the International Tennis Federation (ITF)), the ATP World Tour Masters 1000, the ATP World Tour 500 series, the ATP World Tour 250 series, the ATP World Team Championship, the Davis Cup (organized by the ITF), the ATP World Tour Finals, and the tennis event at the London Summer Olympic Games. Also included in the 2012 calendar is the Hopman Cup, which is organized by the ITF and does not distribute ranking points.

== ATP Challenger Tour ==
The ATP Challenger Tour is the secondary professional tennis circuit organized by the ATP. The 2012 ATP Challenger Tour calendar comprises 15 top tier Tretorn SERIE+ tournaments, and approximately 150 regular series tournaments, with prize money ranging from $35,000 up to $150,000.

== WTA Tour ==
The 2012 WTA Tour is the elite professional tennis circuit organized by the Women's Tennis Association (WTA) for the 2012 tennis season. The 2012 WTA Tour calendar comprises the Grand Slam tournaments (supervised by the International Tennis Federation (ITF)), the WTA Premier tournaments (Premier Mandatory, Premier 5, and regular Premier), the WTA International tournaments, the Fed Cup (organized by the ITF), the year-end championships (the WTA Tour Championships and the Tournament of Champions), and the tennis event at the London Summer Olympic Games. Also included in the 2012 calendar is the Hopman Cup, which is organized by the ITF and does not distribute ranking points.

== Retirements ==
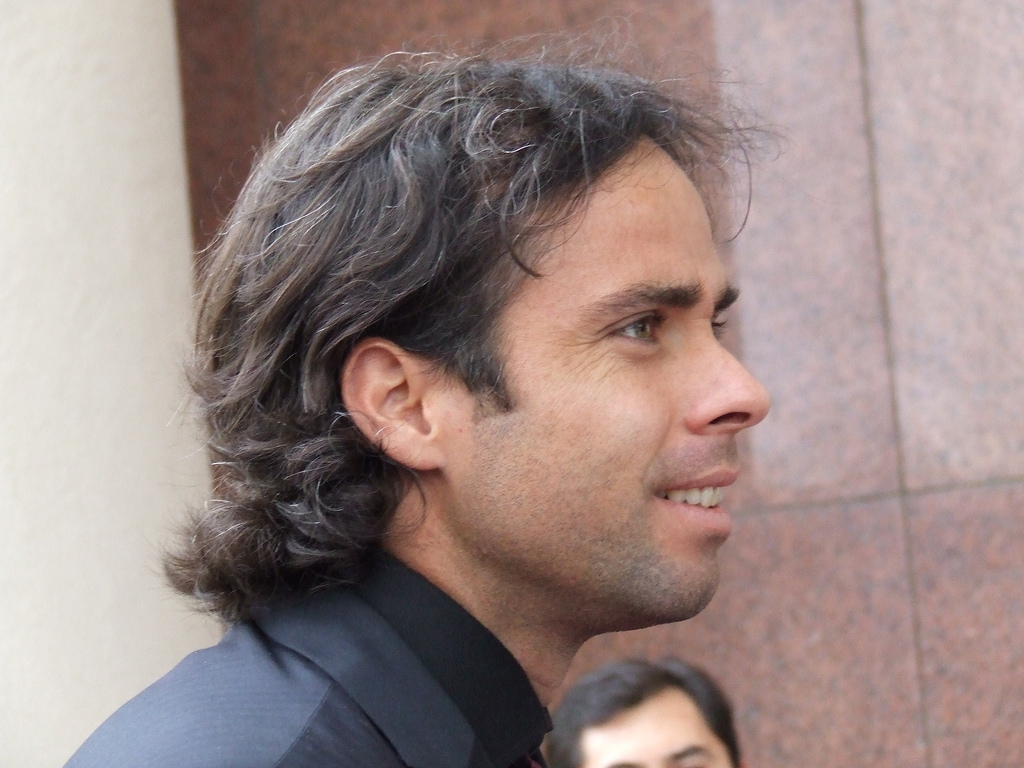
2007 Australian Open runner-up Fernando González retired after the Indian Wells–Miami American swing.

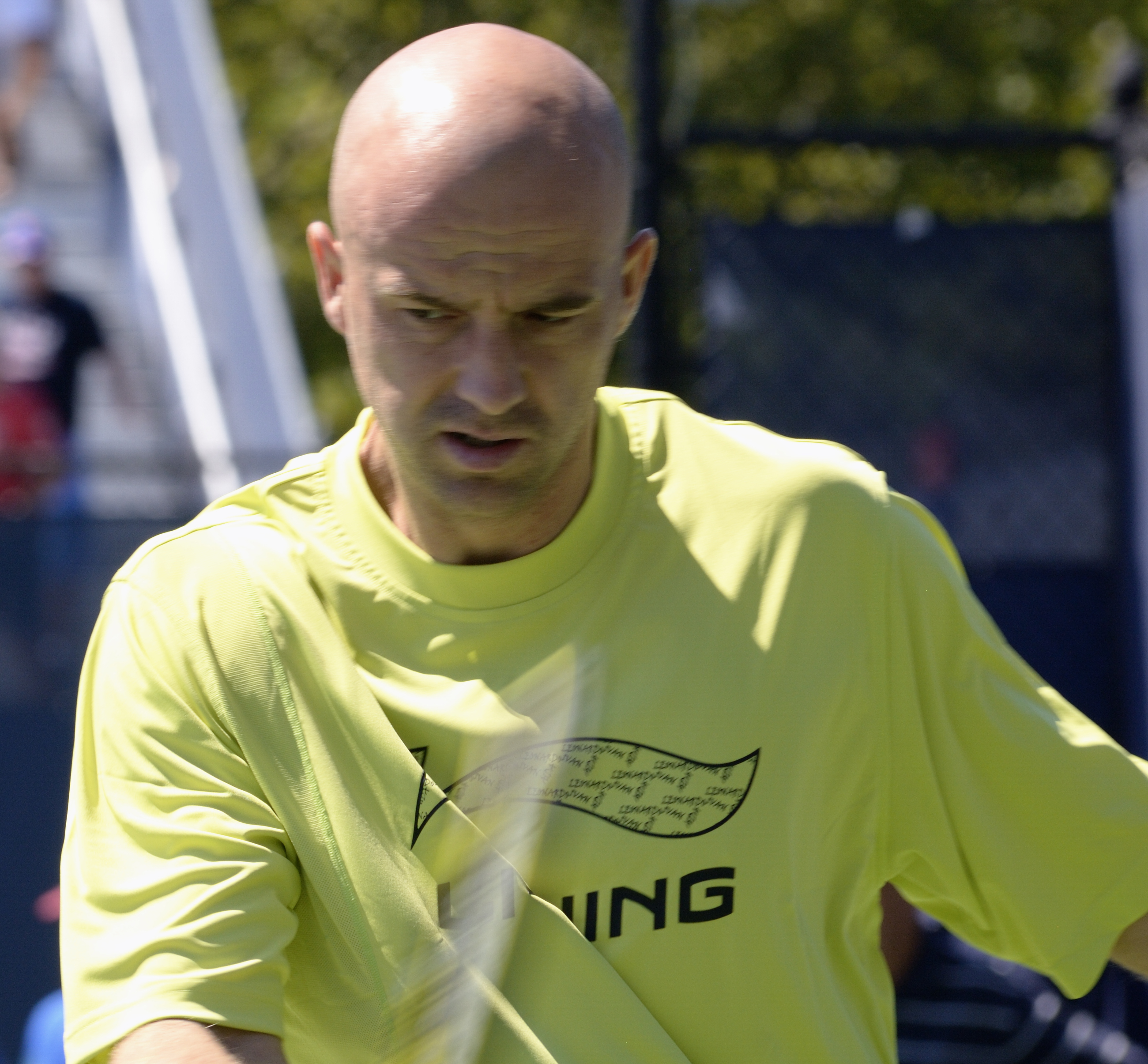
Former World No. 3 Ivan Ljubičić played for the last time at the Monte Carlo Masters.

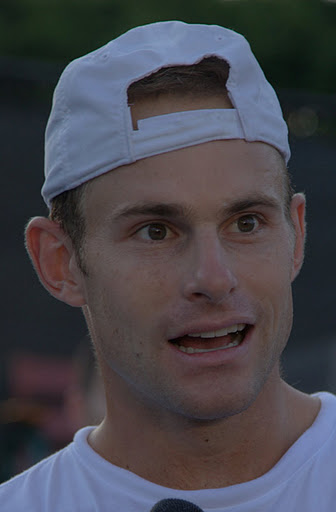
Andy Roddick was the year-end World No. 1 at the end of the 2003 season.

Following is a list of notable players (winners of a main tour title, and/or part of the ATP rankings Top 100 (singles) or Top 50 (doubles) for at least one week) who announced their retirement from professional tennis, became inactive (after not playing for more than 52 weeks), or were permanently banned from playing, during the 2012 season:

- Peter Luczak (born 31 August 1979 in Warsaw, Poland, moved to Australia in 1980) joined the main circuit in 2000, peaking at No. 64 in singles in 2009. Competing mainly on the ITF Men's Circuit and the ATP Challenger Tour during his career, Luczak's best result came with a gold medal in doubles (w/ Hanley) at the 2010 New Delhi Commonwealth Games. The Australian retired from the sport after losing in the second round of the Australian Open doubles in January.
- Rainer Schüttler (born 25 April 1976 in Korbach, West Germany) turned professional in 1995, reaching career-high rankings of singles No. 5 in 2004, and doubles No. 40 in 2005. Schüttler won four singles and four doubles titles during his stint on the main circuit, his best Grand Slam results coming with a final at the Australian Open (2003, lost to Agassi), and a semifinal run at Wimbledon (2008). Alongside countryman Nicolas Kiefer, the German also took the silver medal in doubles at the 2004 Athens Olympics, losing the final in five sets (to González/Massú). Schüttler last played in Melbourne in January.
- Juan Pablo Brzezicki (born 12 April 1982 in Buenos Aires, Argentina) joined the tour in 2001, reaching a career-high ranking of singles No. 94 in 2008. Winner of one doubles titles on the main circuit, Brzezicki competed for the last time in Buenos Aires in February.
- (Chile) Fernando González (born July 29, 1980, in Santiago, Chile) joined the main tour in 1999, and reached his best singles ranking, No. 5, in early 2007, finishing two seasons in the Top Ten (2006–07). A Junior World No. 1, winner of the boys' doubles at the US Open in 1997 and the boys' singles and doubles at the French Open in 1998, González won 11 singles and three doubles titles on the pro circuit, and gathered three medals at the Olympics : the bronze in singles and the gold in doubles (w/ Nicolás Massú, def. Kiefer/Schüttler) in 2004, and the silver in singles (lost the final to Nadal) in 2008. The Chilean reached the last eight at every major, making three quarterfinals at Wimbledon (2005) and the US Open (2002, 2009), one semifinal at the French (2009), and one final at the Australian Open (2007, lost to Federer). Struggling with injuries for more than a year before deciding to retire, González played his last event in Miami in March.
- José Acasuso (born 20 October 1982 in Posadas, Argentina) turned professional in 1999, reaching career-high rankings of singles No. 20 and doubles No. 27, both in 2006. Mainly a clay court specialist, the Argentine took three singles and five doubles career titles, all on the surface. Playing for Argentina, Acasuso competed in two Davis Cup finals (2006, 2008), but helped claim one World Team Cup title (2007). Acasuso announced his retirement in February, less than a year after his last match in the French Open qualifying in May 2011.
- (Croatia) Ivan Ljubičić (born 19 March 1979 in Banja Luka, SFR Yugoslavia, now Bosnia and Herzegovina) turned professional in 1998, peaking at No. 3 in singles in 2006, ending two seasons in the Top Ten (2005–06). During his career Ljubičić won 10 singles titles, including one Masters shield at Indian Wells (2010), and went past the fourth round twice in Grand Slam tournaments, reaching one quarterfinal at the Australian Open (2006) and one semifinal at the French Open (2006). Playing for his country, the Croat partnered Mario Ančić to a bronze medal in doubles at the 2004 Athens Olympics, and took part in one successful Davis Cup campaign (2005). Ljubičić played his last tournament in Monte Carlo in April.
- Arnaud Clément (born 17 December 1977 in Aix-en-Provence, France) became a tennis professional in 1996, peaking as singles No. 10 in 2001, and doubles No. 8 in 2008. In singles, Clément won four titles, made the quarterfinals at all majors but one (the French Open), and reached one Grand Slam final at the Australian Open (2001, lost to Agassi). In doubles, he collected 12 titles and made two major finals with Michaël Llodra, winning one at Wimbledon (2007), and losing the other in Australia (2008). A member of the French Davis Cup team for nine years, winner of one title (2001), Clément was selected in June to become the new captain starting in 2013. The Frenchman played his last event on the tour in the Wimbledon doubles in July.
- Andy Roddick (born 30 August 1982 in Omaha, United States) turned professional in 2000, and became the sixth American player to be ranked World No. 1 in singles when he reached the top spot on November 3, 2003, holding it for a single spell of 13 straight weeks. Roddick finished nine seasons in the ATP rankings singles Top Ten (2002–10), including one year as No. 1 (2003), and also reached the No. 50 ranking in doubles in 2010. As a Junior, the American took two singles Grand Slam titles at the Australian Open and the US Open in 2000, finishing the season as Junior World No. 1. Over his 12-year pro career, Roddick collected 32 singles titles, on every surface, among which five Masters shields and one Grand Slam title, at the US Open (2003, def. Ferrero). Roddick's other best results in majors came with four semifinals at the Australian Open (2003, 2005, 2007, 2009), three finals at Wimbledon (2004, 2005, 2009, all lost to Federer), and another final at the US Open (2006, lost to Federer). In doubles, Roddick won four titles including one Masters trophy. Part of the United States Davis Cup roster for 25 ties over 10 years, Roddick helped the team to a final in 2004, and a title (the country's 32nd) in 2007. The American announced he would retire after the US Open in September.

== International Tennis Hall of Fame ==
- Class of 2012:
  - Jennifer Capriati, player
  - Gustavo Kuerten, player
  - Manuel Orantes, player
  - Michael Davies, contributor

== See also ==
- 2012 Australian Open
- 2012 French Open
- 2012 Wimbledon Championships
- 2012 US Open (tennis)
- Tennis at the 2012 Summer Olympics
