= 2022 in tennis =

This page covers all the important events in the sport of tennis in 2022. It provides the results of notable tournaments throughout the year on both the ATP and WTA Tours, the Davis Cup, and the Fed Cup.

== News ==
Rafael Nadal won his second Australian Open title and record-breaking 21st major title overall (breaking a tie he held with Novak Djokovic and Roger Federer), defeating Daniil Medvedev in the final.

Nadal began 2022 with a 22-match win streak which ended with his loss in the finals of the 2022 BNP Paribas Open to Taylor Fritz.

Djokovic, who is unvaccinated, did not play the Australian Open or tournaments in the United States because of vaccination requirements. Djokovic traveled to Australia believing he'd be able to play with a medical exemption but after a short detainment by the Australian Border Force, was deported from the country by Alex Hawke, the Minister for Immigration, Citizenship, Migrant Services and Multicultural Affairs. In an interview with BBC News' Amol Rajan, Djokovic said missing tournaments because of his vaccination status was "the price that I'm willing to pay".

2022 saw a rise in violent incidents with players like Alexander Zverev, Nick Kyrgios, and Jenson Brooksby throwing rackets and either hitting or nearly hitting officials or ball kids. Former players including Andy Roddick and Patrick McEnroe expressed their anger on Twitter that players weren't being punished. McEnroe wrote: "Seriously what is it going to take ...drawing blood ...to properly punish a tennis player. This is absolutely absurd."

Three-time grand slam champion Ashleigh Barty retired at 25 years old and was removed from the rankings making Iga Świątek the first Polish world No. 1.

2021 US Open champion Daniil Medvedev claimed the No. 1 ranking following many of Djokovic's absences. This ended Djokovic's record 361 weeks as No. 1 and made Medvedev the first player outside of The Big Four to be No. 1 since Andy Roddick in 2004. Djokovic regained his No. 1 position after Medvedev was defeated at the 2022 BNP Paribas Open.

As part of international sports' reaction to the Russian invasion of Ukraine, the WTA, the ATP, the ITF, and the four Grand Slam tournaments jointly announced that players from Belarus and Russia would not be allowed to play under the names or flags of their countries, but would remain eligible to play events until further notice. Certain Russian and Belarusian players such as Medvedev, Anastasia Pavlyuchenkova, and Andrey Rublev spoke out against the war. After winning his semifinal match at the 2022 Dubai Tennis Championships, Rublev wrote "No war please" on a camera lens, a few days into the invasion. Belarusian and former No. 1, Victoria Azarenka was seen visibly crying during her third round loss at the 2022 BNP Paribas Open, and a few weeks later, stormed out of her match for good at the third round of the 2022 Miami Open against Linda Fruhvirtová. In a statement following her retirement, Azarenka said that her personal life had been "extremely stressful" and that she "shouldn't have gone on the court today". She deleted her social media accounts and said that she planned to take a break from the tour.

Twenty-three-time Grand Slam champion and 5 time Olympic gold medalist Serena Williams made her return to the 2022 WTA Tour after sustaining a hamstring injury in the first round of the 2021 Wimbledon Championships. Accepting a wildcard into the women's draw of the 2022 Wimbledon Championships, Williams lost in the first round to Harmony Tan. This was only the second time in her career that she lost in the first round of a Grand Slam tournament. Following her Wimbledon loss, she returned for the US Open Series, where she beat Nuria Párrizas Díaz in straight sets at the 2022 National Bank Open. The following day, in an essay in Vogue, Williams announced she would be "evolving away" from tennis, signaling the end of her career after the 2022 US Open. The next day, she lost in the second round to Belinda Bencic. At the 2022 Cincinnati Masters, Williams lost to reigning US Open champion, Emma Raducanu. Prior to the US Open, Williams announced she would be playing doubles with her sister, Venus Williams. At her first round match at the 2022 US Open against Danka Kovinic, Williams won in straight sets. She then drew world no. 2 Anett Kontaveit, who she beat in three sets. With her win against Kontaveit, Williams became the oldest woman to defeat a top 3 player. The following night, Serena and Venus' doubles match was the first opening round doubles match to be televised in primetime. In her third round match against Ajla Tomljanović, Williams lost in three sets, despite commanding an early lead. With this loss, Williams confirmed her retirement after 27 years on the professional tour. Serena Williams is considered by many to be the greatest women's tennis player of all time.

Furthermore, twenty-time Grand Slam champion Roger Federer announced his retirement at the end of 2022 Laver Cup after numerous injury setbacks at the end of the 2021 Wimbledon Championships.

== ITF ==
=== Grand Slam events ===
Category	Championship	Champions	Finalists	Score in the final
Men's singles	Australian Open	(Spain) Rafael Nadal	(Russia) Daniil Medvedev	2–6, 6–7^{(5–7)}, 6–4, 6–4, 7–5
Men's singles	French Open	(Spain) Rafael Nadal	(Norway) Casper Ruud	6–3, 6–3, 6–0
Men's singles	Wimbledon	(Serbia) Novak Djokovic	(Australia) Nick Kyrgios	4–6, 6–3, 6–4, 7–6^{(7–3)}
Men's singles	US Open	(Spain) Carlos Alcaraz	(Norway) Casper Ruud	6–4, 2–6, 7–6^{(7–1)}, 6–3

Category	Championship	Champions	Finalists	Score in the final
Women's singles	Australian Open	(Australia) Ashleigh Barty	(United States) Danielle Collins	6–3, 7–6^{(7–2)}
Women's singles	French Open	(Poland) Iga Świątek	(United States) Coco Gauff	6–1, 6–3
Women's singles	Wimbledon	(Kazakhstan) Elena Rybakina	(Tunisia) Ons Jabeur	3–6, 6–2, 6–2
Women's singles	US Open	(Poland) Iga Świątek	(Tunisia) Ons Jabeur	6–2, 7–6^{(7–5)}

Category	Championship	Champions	Finalists	Score in the final
Men's doubles	Australian Open	(Australia) Thanasi Kokkinakis (Australia) Nick Kyrgios	(Australia) Matthew Ebden (Australia) Max Purcell	7–5, 6–4
Men's doubles	French Open	(El Salvador) Marcelo Arévalo (Netherlands) Jean-Julien Rojer	(Croatia) Ivan Dodig (United States) Austin Krajicek	6–7^{(4–7)}, 7–6^{(7–5)}, 6–3
Men's doubles	Wimbledon	(Australia) Matthew Ebden (Australia) Max Purcell	(Croatia) Nikola Mektić (Croatia) Mate Pavić	7–6^{(7–5)}, 6–7^{(3–7)}, 4–6, 6–4, 7–6^{(10–2)}
Men's doubles	US Open	(United States) Rajeev Ram (United Kingdom) Joe Salisbury	(Netherlands) Wesley Koolhof (United Kingdom) Neal Skupski	7–6^{(7–4)}, 7–5

Category	Championship	Champions	Finalists	Score in the final
Women's doubles	Australian Open	(Czech Republic) Barbora Krejčíková (Czech Republic) Kateřina Siniaková	(Kazakhstan) Anna Danilina (Brazil) Beatriz Haddad Maia	6–7^{(3–7)}, 6–4, 6–4
Women's doubles	French Open	(France) Caroline Garcia (France) Kristina Mladenovic	(United States) Coco Gauff (United States) Jessica Pegula	2–6, 6–3, 6–2
Women's doubles	Wimbledon	(Czech Republic) Barbora Krejčíková (Czech Republic) Kateřina Siniaková	(Belgium) Elise Mertens (China) Zhang Shuai	6–2, 6–4
Women's doubles	US Open	(Czech Republic) Barbora Krejčíková (Czech Republic) Kateřina Siniaková	(United States) Caty McNally (United States) Taylor Townsend	3–6, 7–5, 6–1

Category	Championship	Champions	Finalists	Score in the final
Mixed doubles	Australian Open	(France) Kristina Mladenovic (Croatia) Ivan Dodig	(Australia) Jaimee Fourlis (Australia) Jason Kubler	6–3, 6–4
Mixed doubles	French Open	(Japan) Ena Shibahara (Netherlands) Wesley Koolhof	(Norway) Ulrikke Eikeri (Belgium) Joran Vliegen	7–6^{(7–5)}, 6–2
Mixed doubles	Wimbledon	(United Kingdom) Neal Skupski (United States) Desirae Krawczyk	(Australia) Matthew Ebden (Australia) Samantha Stosur	6–4, 6–3
Mixed doubles	US Open	(Australia) Storm Sanders (Australia) John Peers	(Belgium) Kirsten Flipkens (France) Édouard Roger-Vasselin	4–6, 6–4, [10–7]

== ATP/WTA ==
=== ATP Masters 1000/WTA 1000 ===
Category	Championship	Champions	Finalists	Score in the final
Men's singles	Indian Wells Masters	(United States) Taylor Fritz	(Spain) Rafael Nadal	6–3, 7–6^{(7–5)}
Men's singles	Miami Open	(Spain) Carlos Alcaraz	(Norway) Casper Ruud	7–5, 6–4
Men's singles	Monte-Carlo Masters	(Greece) Stefanos Tsitsipas	(Spain) Alejandro Davidovich Fokina	6–3, 7–6^{(7–3)}
Men's singles	Madrid Open	(Spain) Carlos Alcaraz	(Germany) Alexander Zverev	6–3, 6–1
Men's singles	Italian Open	(Serbia) Novak Djokovic	(Greece) Stefanos Tsitsipas	6–0, 7–6^{(7–5)}
Men's singles	Canadian Open	(Spain) Pablo Carreño Busta	(Poland) Hubert Hurkacz	3–6, 6–3, 6–3
Men's singles	Cincinnati Masters	(Croatia) Borna Ćorić	(Greece) Stefanos Tsitsipas	7–6^{(7–0)}, 6–2
Men's singles	Paris Masters	(Denmark) Holger Rune	(Serbia) Novak Djokovic	3–6, 6–3, 7–5

Category	Championship	Champions	Finalists	Score in the final
Women's singles	Qatar Total Open	(Poland) Iga Świątek	(Estonia) Anett Kontaveit	6–2, 6–0
Women's singles	Indian Wells Masters	(Poland) Iga Świątek	(Greece) Maria Sakkari	6–4, 6–1
Women's singles	Miami Open	(Poland) Iga Świątek	(Japan) Naomi Osaka	6–4, 6–0
Women's singles	Madrid Open	(Tunisia) Ons Jabeur	(United States) Jessica Pegula	7–5, 0–6, 6–2
Women's singles	Italian Open	(Poland) Iga Świątek	(Tunisia) Ons Jabeur	6–2, 6–2
Women's singles	Canadian Open	(Romania) Simona Halep	(Brazil) Beatriz Haddad Maia	6–3, 2–6, 6–3
Women's singles	Cincinnati Masters	(France) Caroline Garcia	(Czech Republic) Petra Kvitová	6–2, 6–4
Women's singles	Guadalajara Open	(United States) Jessica Pegula	(Greece) Maria Sakkari	6–2, 6–3

Category	Championship	Champions	Finalists	Score in the final
Men's doubles	Indian Wells Masters	(United States) John Isner (United States) Jack Sock	(Mexico) Santiago González (France) Édouard Roger-Vasselin	7–6^{(7–4)}, 6–3
Men's doubles	Miami Open	(Poland) Hubert Hurkacz (United States) John Isner	(Netherlands) Wesley Koolhof (United Kingdom) Neal Skupski	7–6^{(7–5)}, 6–4
Men's doubles	Monte-Carlo Masters	(United States) Rajeev Ram (United Kingdom) Joe Salisbury	(Colombia) Juan Sebastián Cabal (Colombia) Robert Farah	6–4, 3–6, [10–7]
Men's doubles	Madrid Open	(Netherlands) Wesley Koolhof (United Kingdom) Neal Skupski	(Colombia) Juan Sebastián Cabal (Colombia) Robert Farah	7–6^{(7–4)}, 4–6, [10–5]
Men's doubles	Italian Open	(Croatia) Nikola Mektić (Croatia) Mate Pavić	(United States) John Isner (Argentina) Diego Schwartzman	6–2, 6–7^{(6–8)}, [12–10]
Men's doubles	Canadian Open	(Netherlands) Wesley Koolhof (United Kingdom) Neal Skupski	(United Kingdom) Dan Evans (Australia) John Peers	6–2, 4–6, [10–6]
Men's doubles	Cincinnati Masters	(United States) Rajeev Ram (United Kingdom) Joe Salisbury	(Germany) Tim Pütz (New Zealand) Michael Venus	7–6^{(7–4)}, 7–6^{(7–5)}
Men's doubles	Paris Masters	(Netherlands) Wesley Koolhof (United Kingdom) Neal Skupski	(Croatia) Ivan Dodig (United States) Austin Krajicek	7–6^{(7–5)}, 6–4

Category	Championship	Champions	Finalists	Score in the final
Women's doubles	Qatar Total Open	(United States) Coco Gauff (United States) Jessica Pegula	(Russia) Veronika Kudermetova (Belgium) Elise Mertens	3–6, 7–5, [10–5]
Women's doubles	Indian Wells Masters	(China) Xu Yifan (China) Yang Zhaoxuan	(United States) Asia Muhammad (Japan) Ena Shibahara	7–5, 7–6^{(7–4)}
Women's doubles	Miami Open	(Germany) Laura Siegemund; Vera Zvonareva	Veronika Kudermetova (Belgium) Elise Mertens	7–6^{(7–3)}, 7–5
Women's doubles	Madrid Open	(Canada) Gabriela Dabrowski (Mexico) Giuliana Olmos	(United States) Desirae Krawczyk (Netherlands) Demi Schuurs	7–6^{(7–1)}, 5–7, [10–7]
Women's doubles	Italian Open	Veronika Kudermetova Anastasia Pavlyuchenkova	(Canada) Gabriela Dabrowski (Mexico) Giuliana Olmos	1–6, 6–4, [10–7]
Women's doubles	Canadian Open	(United States) Coco Gauff (United States) Jessica Pegula	(United States) Nicole Melichar-Martinez (Australia) Ellen Perez	6–4, 6–7^{(5–7)}, [10–5]
Women's doubles	Cincinnati Masters	(Ukraine) Lyudmyla Kichenok (Latvia) Jeļena Ostapenko	(United States) Nicole Melichar-Martinez (Australia) Ellen Perez	7–6^{(7–5)}, 6–3
Women's doubles	Guadalajara Open	(Australia) Storm Sanders (Brazil) Luisa Stefani	(Kazakhstan) Anna Danilina (Brazil) Beatriz Haddad Maia	7–6^{(7–4)}, 6–7^{(2–7)}, [10–8]
