= 2024 in tennis =

This page covers all the important events in the sport of tennis in 2024. It provides the results of notable tournaments throughout the year on both the ATP and WTA Tours, the Davis Cup, and the Billie Jean King Cup. Also notable is Tennis at the 2024 Summer Olympics. It was the first time since 2002, where "The Big 3" (Novak Djokovic, Roger Federer and Rafael Nadal) did not win either the US Open, Wimbledon, Australian Open, or French Open.

== ITF ==
=== Grand Slam events ===
Category	Championship	Champions	Finalists	Score in the final
Men's singles	Australian Open	(Italy) Jannik Sinner	Daniil Medvedev	3–6, 3–6, 6–4, 6–4, 6–3
Men's singles	French Open	(Spain) Carlos Alcaraz	(Germany) Alexander Zverev	6–3, 2–6, 5–7, 6–1, 6–2
Men's singles	Wimbledon	(Spain) Carlos Alcaraz	(Serbia) Novak Djokovic	6–2, 6–2, 7–6^{(7–4)}
Men's singles	US Open	(Italy) Jannik Sinner	(United States) Taylor Fritz	6–3, 6–4, 7–5

Category	Championship	Champions	Finalists	Score in the final
Women's singles	Australian Open	Aryna Sabalenka	(China) Zheng Qinwen	6–3, 6–2
Women's singles	French Open	(Poland) Iga Świątek	(Italy) Jasmine Paolini	6-2, 6-1
Women's singles	Wimbledon	(Czech Republic) Barbora Krejčíková	(Italy) Jasmine Paolini	6–2, 2–6, 6–4
Women's singles	US Open	Aryna Sabalenka	(United States) Jessica Pegula	7–5, 7–5

Category	Championship	Champions	Finalists	Score in the final
Men's doubles	Australian Open	(India) Rohan Bopanna (Australia) Matthew Ebden	(Italy) Simone Bolelli (Italy) Andrea Vavassori	7–6^{(7–0)}, 7–5
Men's doubles	French Open	(El Salvador) Marcelo Arévalo (Croatia) Mate Pavić	(Italy) Simone Bolelli (Italy) Andrea Vavassori	7–5, 6–3
Men's doubles	Wimbledon	(Finland) Harri Heliövaara (United Kingdom) Henry Patten	(Australia) Max Purcell (Australia) Jordan Thompson	6–7^{(7–9)}, 7–6^{(10–8)}, 7–6^{(11–9)}
Men's doubles	US Open	(Australia) Max Purcell (Australia) Jordan Thompson	(Germany) Kevin Krawietz (Germany) Tim Pütz	6–4, 7–6^{(7–4)}

Category	Championship	Champions	Finalists	Score in the final
Women's doubles	Australian Open	(Chinese Taipei) Hsieh Su-wei (Belgium) Elise Mertens	(Ukraine) Lyudmyla Kichenok (Latvia) Jeļena Ostapenko	6–1, 7–5
Women's doubles	French Open	(United States) Coco Gauff (Czech Republic) Kateřina Siniaková	(Italy) Sara Errani (Italy) Jasmine Paolini	7–6^{(7–5)}, 6–3
Women's doubles	Wimbledon	(Czech Republic) Kateřina Siniaková (United States) Taylor Townsend	(Canada) Gabriela Dabrowski (New Zealand) Erin Routliffe	7–6^{(7–5)}, 7–6^{(7–1)}
Women's doubles	US Open	(Ukraine) Lyudmyla Kichenok (Latvia) Jeļena Ostapenko	(France) Kristina Mladenovic (China) Zhang Shuai	6–4, 6–3

Category	Championship	Champions	Finalists	Score in the final
Mixed doubles	Australian Open	(Chinese Taipei) Hsieh Su-wei (Poland) Jan Zieliński	(United States) Desirae Krawczyk (United Kingdom) Neal Skupski	6–7^{(5–7)}, 6–4, [11–9]
Mixed doubles	French Open	(Germany) Laura Siegemund (France) Édouard Roger-Vasselin	(United States) Desirae Krawczyk (United Kingdom) Neal Skupski	6–4, 7–5
Mixed doubles	Wimbledon	(Poland) Jan Zieliński (Chinese Taipei) Hsieh Su-wei	(Mexico) Santiago González (Mexico) Giuliana Olmos	6–4, 6–2
Mixed doubles	US Open	(Italy) Sara Errani (Italy) Andrea Vavassori	(United States) Taylor Townsend (United States) Donald Young	7–6^{(7–0)}, 7–5

=== Summer Olympics ===
Event	Gold	Silver	Bronze
Men's singles	Novak Djokovic; Serbia	Carlos Alcaraz; Spain	Lorenzo Musetti; Italy
Men's doubles	Australia; Matthew Ebden; John Peers	United States; Austin Krajicek; Rajeev Ram	United States; Taylor Fritz; Tommy Paul
Women's singles	Zheng Qinwen; China	Donna Vekić; Croatia	Iga Świątek; Poland
Women's doubles	Italy; Sara Errani; Jasmine Paolini	Individual Neutral Athletes; Mirra Andreeva; Diana Shnaider	Spain; Cristina Bucșa; Sara Sorribes Tormo
Mixed doubles	Czech Republic; Kateřina Siniaková; Tomáš Macháč	China; Wang Xinyu; Zhang Zhizhen	Canada; Gabriela Dabrowski; Félix Auger-Aliassime

== Davis Cup ==
Knockout stage

Quarterfinals
21 November
Italy	2
Argentina	1
21 November
United States	1
Australia	2
20 November
Germany	2
Canada	0
19 November
Netherlands	2
Spain	1

Semifinals
23 November
Italy	2
Australia	0
22 November
Germany	0
Netherlands	2

Final
24 November
Italy	2
Netherlands	0

== Billie Jean King Cup ==
First round
Germany	0
Great Britain	2
Slovakia	2
United States	1
Spain	0
Poland	2
Japan	2
Romania	1

Quarter-finals
1	Canada	0
Great Britain	2
4	Australia	0
Slovakia	2
Poland	2
2	Czech Republic	1
Japan	1
3	Italy	2

Semi-finals
Great Britain	1
Slovakia	2
Poland	1
3	Italy	2

Final
Slovakia	0
3	Italy	2

== ATP / WTA ==
=== Year-end Championships ===
==== Singles ====
	Championship	Champions	Finalists	Score in the final
Men	Turin	(Italy) Jannik Sinner	(United States) Taylor Fritz	6–4, 6–4
Women	Riyadh	(United States) Coco Gauff	(China) Zheng Qinwen	3–6, 6–4, 7–6^{(7–2)}

==== Doubles ====
	Championship	Champions	Finalists	Score in the final
Men	Turin	(Germany) Kevin Krawietz (Germany) Tim Pütz	(El Salvador) Marcelo Arévalo (Croatia) Mate Pavić	7–6^{(7–5)}, 7–6^{(8–6)}
Women	Riyadh	(Canada) Gabriela Dabrowski (New Zealand) Erin Routliffe	(Czech Republic) Kateřina Siniaková (United States) Taylor Townsend	7–5, 6–3

=== ATP Masters 1000/WTA 1000 ===
==== Men's singles ====
Championship	Champions	Finalists	Score in the final
Indian Wells Masters	(Spain) Carlos Alcaraz	Daniil Medvedev	7–6^{(7–5)}, 6–1
Miami Open	(Italy) Jannik Sinner	(Bulgaria) Grigor Dimitrov	6–3, 6–1
Monte-Carlo Masters	(Greece) Stefanos Tsitsipas	(Norway) Casper Ruud	6–1, 6–4
Madrid Open	Andrey Rublev	(Canada) Félix Auger-Aliassime	4–6, 7–5, 7–5
Italian Open	(Germany) Alexander Zverev	(Chile) Nicolás Jarry	6–4, 7–5
Canadian Open	(Australia) Alexei Popyrin	Andrey Rublev	6–2, 6–4
Cincinnati Open	(Italy) Jannik Sinner	(United States) Frances Tiafoe	7–6^{(7–4)}, 6–2
Shanghai Masters	(Italy) Jannik Sinner	(Serbia) Novak Djokovic	7–6^{(7–4)}, 6–3
Paris Masters	(Germany) Alexander Zverev	(France) Ugo Humbert	6–2, 6–2

==== Women's singles ====
Championship	Champions	Finalists	Score in the final
Qatar Open	(Poland) Iga Świątek	(Kazakhstan) Elena Rybakina	7–6^{(10–8)}, 6–2
Dubai Championships	(Italy) Jasmine Paolini	Anna Kalinskaya	4–6, 7–5, 7–5
Indian Wells Open	(Poland) Iga Świątek	(Greece) Maria Sakkari	6–4, 6–0
Miami Open	(United States) Danielle Collins	(Kazakhstan) Elena Rybakina	7–5, 6–3
Madrid Open	(Poland) Iga Świątek	Aryna Sabalenka	7–5, 4–6, 7–6^{(9–7)}
Italian Open	(Poland) Iga Świątek	Aryna Sabalenka	6–2, 6–3
Canadian Open	(United States) Jessica Pegula	(United States) Amanda Anisimova	6–3, 2–6, 6–1
Cincinnati Open	Aryna Sabalenka	(United States) Jessica Pegula	6–3, 7–5
China Open	(United States) Coco Gauff	(Czech Republic) Karolína Muchová	6–1, 6–3
Wuhan Open	Aryna Sabalenka	(China) Zheng Qinwen	6–3, 5–7, 6–3

==== Men's doubles ====
Championship	Champions	Finalists	Score in the final
Indian Wells Masters	(Netherlands) Wesley Koolhof (Croatia) Nikola Mektić	(Spain) Marcel Granollers (Argentina) Horacio Zeballos	7–6^{(7–2)}, 7–6^{(7–4)}
Miami Open	(India) Rohan Bopanna (Australia) Matthew Ebden	(Croatia) Ivan Dodig (United States) Austin Krajicek	6–7^{(3–7)}, 6–3, [10–6]
Monte-Carlo Masters	(Belgium) Sander Gillé (Belgium) Joran Vliegen	(Brazil) Marcelo Melo (Germany) Alexander Zverev	5–7, 6–3, [10–5]
Madrid Open	(United States) Sebastian Korda (Australia) Jordan Thompson	(Uruguay) Ariel Behar (Czech Republic) Adam Pavlásek	6–3, 7–6^{(9–7)}
Italian Open	(Spain) Marcel Granollers (Argentina) Horacio Zeballos	(El Salvador) Marcelo Arévalo (Croatia) Mate Pavić	6–2, 6–2
Canadian Open	(Spain) Marcel Granollers (Argentina) Horacio Zeballos	(United States) Rajeev Ram (United Kingdom) Joe Salisbury	6–2, 7–6^{(7–4)}
Cincinnati Masters	(El Salvador) Marcelo Arévalo (Croatia) Mate Pavić	(United States) Mackenzie McDonald (United States) Alex Michelsen	6-2, 6-4
Shanghai Masters	(Netherlands) Wesley Koolhof (Croatia) Nikola Mektić	(Argentina) Máximo González (Argentina) Andrés Molteni	6-4, 6-4
Paris Masters	(Netherlands) Wesley Koolhof (Croatia) Nikola Mektić	(United Kingdom) Lloyd Glasspool (Czech Republic) Adam Pavlásek	3–6, 6–3, [10–5]

==== Women's doubles ====
Championship	Champions	Finalists	Score in the final
Qatar Open	(Netherlands) Demi Schuurs (Brazil) Luisa Stefani	(United States) Caroline Dolehide (United States) Desirae Krawczyk	6–4, 6–2
Dubai Championships	(Australia) Storm Hunter (Czech Republic) Kateřina Siniaková	(United States) Nicole Melichar-Martinez (Australia) Ellen Perez	6–4, 6–2
Indian Wells Masters	(Chinese Taipei) Hsieh Su-wei (Belgium) Elise Mertens	(Australia) Storm Hunter (Czech Republic) Kateřina Siniaková	6–3, 6–4
Miami Open	(United States) Sofia Kenin (United States) Bethanie Mattek-Sands	(Canada) Gabriela Dabrowski (New Zealand) Erin Routliffe	4–6, 7–6^{(7–5)}, [11–9]
Madrid Open	(Spain) Cristina Bucșa (Spain) Sara Sorribes Tormo	(Czech Republic) Barbora Krejčíková (Germany) Laura Siegemund	6–0, 6–2
Italian Open	(Italy) Sara Errani (Italy) Jasmine Paolini	(United States) Coco Gauff (New Zealand) Erin Routliffe	6–3, 4–6, [10–8]
Canadian Open	(United States) Caroline Dolehide (United States) Desirae Krawczyk	(Canada) Gabriela Dabrowski (New Zealand) Erin Routliffe	7–6(7–2), 3–6, [10–7]
Cincinnati Masters	(United States) Asia Muhammad (New Zealand) Erin Routliffe	(Canada) Leylah Fernandez (Kazakhstan) Yulia Putintseva	3–6, 6–1, [10–4]
China Open	(Italy) Sara Errani (Italy) Jasmine Paolini	(Chinese Taipei) Chan Hao-ching; Veronika Kudermetova	6–4, 6–4
Wuhan Open	(Kazakhstan) Anna Danilina; Irina Khromacheva	(United States) Asia Muhammad (United States) Jessica Pegula	6–3, 7–6^{(8–6)}
