= 2023 in tennis =

This page covers all the important events in the sport of tennis in 2023. It provides the results of notable tournaments throughout the year on both the ATP and WTA Tours, the Davis Cup, and the Billie Jean King Cup.

== ITF ==
=== Grand Slam events ===
Category	Championship	Champions	Finalists	Score in the final
Men's singles	Australian Open	(Serbia) Novak Djokovic	(Greece) Stefanos Tsitsipas	6–3, 7–6^{(7–4)}, 7–6^{(7–5)}
Men's singles	French Open	(Serbia) Novak Djokovic	(Norway) Casper Ruud	7–6^{(7–1)}, 6–3, 7–5
Men's singles	Wimbledon	(Spain) Carlos Alcaraz	(Serbia) Novak Djokovic	1–6, 7–6^{(8–6)}, 6–1, 3–6, 6–4
Men's singles	US Open	(Serbia) Novak Djokovic	Daniil Medvedev	6–3, 7–6^{(7–4)}, 6–3

Category	Championship	Champions	Finalists	Score in the final
Women's singles	Australian Open	Aryna Sabalenka	(Kazakhstan) Elena Rybakina	4–6, 6–3, 6–4
Women's singles	French Open	(Poland) Iga Świątek	(Czech Republic) Karolína Muchová	6–2, 5–7, 6–4
Women's singles	Wimbledon	(Czech Republic) Markéta Vondroušová	(Tunisia) Ons Jabeur	6–4, 6–4
Women's singles	US Open	(United States) Coco Gauff	Aryna Sabalenka	2–6, 6–3, 6–2

Category	Championship	Champions	Finalists	Score in the final
Men's doubles	Australian Open	(Australia) Rinky Hijikata (Australia) Jason Kubler	(Monaco) Hugo Nys (Poland) Jan Zieliński	6–4, 7–6^{(7–4)}
Men's doubles	French Open	(Croatia) Ivan Dodig (United States) Austin Krajicek	(Belgium) Sander Gillé (Belgium) Joran Vliegen	6–3, 6–1
Men's doubles	Wimbledon	(Netherlands) Wesley Koolhof (United Kingdom) Neal Skupski	(Spain) Marcel Granollers (Argentina) Horacio Zeballos	6–4, 6–4
Men's doubles	US Open	(United States) Rajeev Ram (United Kingdom) Joe Salisbury	(India) Rohan Bopanna (Australia) Matthew Ebden	2–6, 6–3, 6–4

Category	Championship	Champions	Finalists	Score in the final
Women's doubles	Australian Open	(Czech Republic) Barbora Krejčíková (Czech Republic) Kateřina Siniaková	(Japan) Shuko Aoyama (Japan) Ena Shibahara	6–4, 6–3
Women's doubles	French Open	(Chinese Taipei) Hsieh Su-wei (China) Wang Xinyu	(Canada) Leylah Fernandez (United States) Taylor Townsend	1–6, 7–6^{(7–5)}, 6–1
Women's doubles	Wimbledon	(Chinese Taipei) Hsieh Su-wei (Czech Republic) Barbora Strýcová	(Australia) Storm Hunter (Belgium) Elise Mertens	7–5, 6–4
Women's doubles	US Open	(Canada) Gabriela Dabrowski (New Zealand) Erin Routliffe	(Germany) Laura Siegemund; Vera Zvonareva	7–6^{(11–9)}, 6–3

Category	Championship	Champions	Finalists	Score in the final
Mixed doubles	Australian Open	(Brazil) Luisa Stefani (Brazil) Rafael Matos	(India) Sania Mirza (India) Rohan Bopanna	7–6^{(7–2)}, 6–2
Mixed doubles	French Open	(Japan) Miyu Kato (Germany) Tim Pütz	(Canada) Bianca Andreescu (New Zealand) Michael Venus	4–6, 6–4, [10–6]
Mixed doubles	Wimbledon	(Croatia) Mate Pavić (Ukraine) Lyudmyla Kichenok	(Belgium) Joran Vliegen (China) Xu Yifan	6–4, 6–7^{(9–11)}, 6–3
Mixed doubles	US Open	(Kazakhstan) Anna Danilina (Finland) Harri Heliövaara	(United States) Jessica Pegula (United States) Austin Krajicek	6–3, 6–4

== IOC ==
- 24 – 30 September:Asian Games
- October 23 – 29: Pan American Games

=== Asian Games ===
Event	Gold	Silver	Bronze
Men's singles	Zhang Zhizhen; China	Yosuke Watanuki; Japan	Khumoyun Sultanov; Uzbekistan
Men's singles	Zhang Zhizhen; China	Yosuke Watanuki; Japan	Hong Seong-chan; South Korea
Men's doubles	Chinese Taipei; Hsu Yu-hsiou; Jason Jung	India; Saketh Myneni; Ramkumar Ramanathan	Thailand; Pruchya Isaro; Maximus Jones
Men's doubles	Chinese Taipei; Hsu Yu-hsiou; Jason Jung	India; Saketh Myneni; Ramkumar Ramanathan	South Korea; Hong Seong-chan; Kwon Soon-woo
Women's singles	Zheng Qinwen; China	Zhu Lin; China	Alexandra Eala; Philippines
Women's singles	Zheng Qinwen; China	Zhu Lin; China	Haruka Kaji; Japan
Women's doubles	Chinese Taipei; Chan Hao-ching; Latisha Chan	Chinese Taipei; Lee Ya-hsuan; Liang En-shuo	South Korea; Back Da-yeon; Jeong Bo-young
Women's doubles	Chinese Taipei; Chan Hao-ching; Latisha Chan	Chinese Taipei; Lee Ya-hsuan; Liang En-shuo	Indonesia; Aldila Sutjiadi; Janice Tjen
Mixed doubles	India; Rohan Bopanna; Rutuja Bhosale	Chinese Taipei; Huang Tsung-hao; Liang En-shuo	Philippines; Francis Alcantara; Alexandra Eala
Mixed doubles	India; Rohan Bopanna; Rutuja Bhosale	Chinese Taipei; Huang Tsung-hao; Liang En-shuo	Chinese Taipei; Hsu Yu-hsiou; Chan Hao-ching

=== Pan American Games ===
Event	Gold	Silver	Bronze
Men's singles	Facundo Díaz Acosta; Argentina	Tomás Barrios Vera; Chile	Thiago Monteiro; Brazil
Men's doubles	Brazil; Gustavo Heide; Marcelo Demoliner	Chile; Tomás Barrios Vera; Alejandro Tabilo	Dominican Republic; Nick Hardt; Roberto Cid Subervi
Women's singles	Laura Pigossi; Brazil	María Lourdes Carlé; Argentina	Julia Riera; Argentina
Women's doubles	Brazil; Laura Pigossi; Luisa Stefani	Colombia; María Herazo González; María Paulina Pérez	Argentina; María Lourdes Carlé; Julia Riera
Mixed doubles	Colombia; Yuliana Lizarazo; Nicolás Barrientos	Brazil; Luisa Stefani; Marcelo Demoliner	Argentina; Martina Capurro; Facundo Díaz Acosta

== Davis Cup ==
=== Knockout stage ===
Quarterfinals
21 November, Málaga
Canada	1
Finland	2
22 November, Málaga
Czech Republic	1
Australia	2
23 November, Málaga
Italy	2
Netherlands	1
23 November, Málaga
Serbia	2
Great Britain	0

Semifinals
24 November, Málaga
Finland	0
Australia	2
25 November, Málaga
Italy	2
Serbia	1

Final
26 November, Málaga
Australia	0
Italy	2

=== Fed Cup ===
Semifinals
Czech Republic	1
Canada	2
Italy	2
Slovenia	0

Final
Canada	2
Italy	0

== ATP/WTA ==
=== ATP Masters 1000/WTA 1000 ===
Category	Championship	Champions	Finalists	Score in the final
Men's singles	Indian Wells Masters	(Spain) Carlos Alcaraz	Daniil Medvedev	6–3, 6–2
Men's singles	Miami Open	Daniil Medvedev	(Italy) Jannik Sinner	7–5, 6–3
Men's singles	Monte-Carlo Masters	Andrey Rublev	(Denmark) Holger Rune	5–7, 6–2, 7–5
Men's singles	Madrid Open	(Spain) Carlos Alcaraz	(Germany) Jan-Lennard Struff	6–4, 3–6, 6–3
Men's singles	Italian Open	Daniil Medvedev	(Denmark) Holger Rune	7–5, 7–5
Men's singles	Canadian Open	(Italy) Jannik Sinner	(Australia) Alex de Minaur	6–4, 6–1
Men's singles	Cincinnati Masters	(Serbia) Novak Djokovic	(Spain) Carlos Alcaraz	5–7, 7–6^{(9–7)}, 7–6^{(7–4)}
Men's singles	Shanghai Masters	(Poland) Hubert Hurkacz	Andrey Rublev	6–3, 3–6, 7–6^{(10–8)}
Men's singles	Paris Masters	(Serbia) Novak Djokovic	(Bulgaria) Grigor Dimitrov	6–4, 6–3

Category	Championship	Champions	Finalists	Score in the final
Women's singles	Dubai Championships	(Czech Republic) Barbora Krejčíková	(Poland) Iga Świątek	6–4, 6–2
Women's singles	Indian Wells Masters	(Kazakhstan) Elena Rybakina	Aryna Sabalenka	7–6^{(13–11)}, 6–4
Women's singles	Miami Open	(Czech Republic) Petra Kvitová	(Kazakhstan) Elena Rybakina	7–6^{(16–14)}, 6–2
Women's singles	Madrid Open	Aryna Sabalenka	(Poland) Iga Świątek	6–3, 3–6, 6–3
Women's singles	Italian Open	(Kazakhstan) Elena Rybakina	(Ukraine) Anhelina Kalinina	6–4, 1–0, ret.
Women's singles	Canadian Open	(United States) Jessica Pegula	Liudmila Samsonova	6–1, 6–0
Women's singles	Cincinnati Masters	(United States) Coco Gauff	(Czech Republic) Karolína Muchová	6–3, 6–4
Women's singles	Guadalajara Open	(Greece) Maria Sakkari	(United States) Caroline Dolehide	7–5, 6–3
Women's singles	China Open	(Poland) Iga Świątek	Liudmila Samsonova	6–2, 6–2

Category	Championship	Champions	Finalists	Score in the final
Men's doubles	Indian Wells Masters	(India) Rohan Bopanna (Australia) Matthew Ebden	(Netherlands) Wesley Koolhof (United Kingdom) Neal Skupski	6–3, 2–6, [10–8]
Men's doubles	Miami Open	(Mexico) Santiago González (France) Édouard Roger-Vasselin	(United States) Austin Krajicek (France) Nicolas Mahut	7–6^{(7–4)}, 7–5
Men's doubles	Monte-Carlo Masters	(Croatia) Ivan Dodig (United States) Austin Krajicek	(Monaco) Romain Arneodo (Austria) Sam Weissborn	6–0, 4–6, [14–12]
Men's doubles	Madrid Open	Karen Khachanov; Andrey Rublev	(India) Rohan Bopanna (Australia) Matthew Ebden	6–3, 3–6, [10–3]
Men's doubles	Italian Open	(Monaco) Hugo Nys (Poland) Jan Zieliński	(Netherlands) Robin Haase (Netherlands) Botic van de Zandschulp	7–5, 6–1
Men's doubles	Canadian Open	(El Salvador) Marcelo Arévalo (Netherlands) Jean-Julien Rojer	(United States) Rajeev Ram (United Kingdom) Joe Salisbury	6–3, 6–1
Men's doubles	Cincinnati Masters	(Argentina) Máximo González (Argentina) Andrés Molteni	(United Kingdom) Jamie Murray (New Zealand) Michael Venus	3–6, 6–1, [11–9]
Men's doubles	Shanghai Masters	(Spain) Marcel Granollers (Argentina) Horacio Zeballos	(India) Rohan Bopanna (Australia) Matthew Ebden	5–7, 6–2, [10–7]
Men's doubles	Paris Masters	(Mexico) Santiago González (France) Édouard Roger-Vasselin	(India) Rohan Bopanna (Australia) Matthew Ebden	6–2, 5–7, [10–7]

Category	Championship	Champions	Finalists	Score in the final
Women's doubles	Dubai Championships	Veronika Kudermetova; Liudmila Samsonova	(Chinese Taipei) Chan Hao-ching (Chinese Taipei) Latisha Chan	6–4, 6–7^{(4–7)}, [10–1]
Women's doubles	Indian Wells Masters	(Czech Republic) Barbora Krejčíková (Czech Republic) Kateřina Siniaková	(Brazil) Beatriz Haddad Maia (Germany) Laura Siegemund	6–1, 6–7^{(3–7)}, [10–7]
Women's doubles	Miami Open	(United States) Coco Gauff (United States) Jessica Pegula	(Canada) Leylah Fernandez (United States) Taylor Townsend	7–6^{(8–6)}, 6–2
Women's doubles	Madrid Open	Victoria Azarenka (Brazil) Beatriz Haddad Maia	(United States) Coco Gauff (United States) Jessica Pegula	6–1, 6–4
Women's doubles	Italian Open	(Australia) Storm Hunter (Belgium) Elise Mertens	(United States) Coco Gauff (United States) Jessica Pegula	6–4, 6–4
Women's doubles	Canadian Open	(Japan) Shuko Aoyama (Japan) Ena Shibahara	(United States) Desirae Krawczyk (Netherlands) Demi Schuurs	6–4, 4–6, [13–11]
Women's doubles	Cincinnati Masters	(United States) Alycia Parks (United States) Taylor Townsend	(United States) Nicole Melichar-Martinez (Australia) Ellen Perez	6–7^{(1–7)}, 6–4, [10–6]
Women's doubles	Guadalajara Open	(Australia) Storm Hunter (Belgium) Elise Mertens	(Canada) Gabriela Dabrowski (New Zealand) Erin Routliffe	3–6, 6–2, [10–4]
Women's doubles	China Open	(Czech Republic) Marie Bouzková (Spain) Sara Sorribes Tormo	(Chinese Taipei) Chan Hao-ching (Mexico) Giuliana Olmos	3–6, 6–0, [10–4]
