= 2018 in tennis =

This page covers important events in the sport of tennis in 2018. Primarily, it provides the results of notable tournaments throughout the year on both the ATP and WTA Tours, the Davis Cup, and the Fed Cup.

== ITF ==
=== Grand Slam events ===
Category	Championship	Champion	Finalist	Score in the final
Men's singles	Australian Open	(Switzerland) Roger Federer	(Croatia) Marin Čilić	6–2, 6–7^{(5–7)}, 6–3, 3–6, 6–1
Men's singles	French Open	(Spain) Rafael Nadal	(Austria) Dominic Thiem	6–4, 6–3, 6–2
Men's singles	Wimbledon	(Serbia) Novak Djokovic	(South Africa) Kevin Anderson	6–2, 6–2, 7–6^{(7–3)}
Men's singles	US Open	(Serbia) Novak Djokovic	(Argentina) Juan Martín del Potro	6–3, 7–6^{(7–4)}, 6–3

Category	Championship	Champion	Finalist	Score in the final
Women's singles	Australian Open	(Denmark) Caroline Wozniacki	(Romania) Simona Halep	7–6^{(7–2)}, 3–6, 6–4
Women's singles	French Open	(Romania) Simona Halep	(United States) Sloane Stephens	3–6, 6–4, 6–1
Women's singles	Wimbledon	(Germany) Angelique Kerber	(United States) Serena Williams	6–3, 6–3
Women's singles	US Open	(Japan) Naomi Osaka	(United States) Serena Williams	6–2, 6–4

Category	Championship	Champions	Finalists	Score in the final
Men's doubles	Australian Open	(Austria) Oliver Marach (Croatia) Mate Pavić	(Colombia) Juan Sebastián Cabal (Colombia) Robert Farah	6–4, 6–4
Men's doubles	French Open	(France) Pierre-Hugues Herbert (France) Nicolas Mahut	(Austria) Oliver Marach (Croatia) Mate Pavić	6–2, 7–6^{(7–4)}
Men's doubles	Wimbledon	(United States) Mike Bryan (United States) Jack Sock	(South Africa) Raven Klaasen (New Zealand) Michael Venus	6–3, 6–7^{(7–9)}, 6–3, 5–7, 7–5
Men's doubles	US Open	(United States) Mike Bryan (United States) Jack Sock	(Poland) Łukasz Kubot (Brazil) Marcelo Melo	6–3, 6–1

Category	Championship	Champions	Finalists	Score in the final
Women's doubles	Australian Open	(Hungary) Tímea Babos (France) Kristina Mladenovic	(Russia) Ekaterina Makarova (Russia) Elena Vesnina	6–4, 6–3
Women's doubles	French Open	(Czech Republic) Barbora Krejčíková (Czech Republic) Kateřina Siniaková	(Japan) Eri Hozumi (Japan) Makoto Ninomiya	6–3, 6–3
Women's doubles	Wimbledon	(Czech Republic) Barbora Krejčíková (Czech Republic) Kateřina Siniaková	(United States) Nicole Melichar (Czech Republic) Květa Peschke	6–4, 4–6, 6–0
Women's doubles	US Open	(Australia) Ashleigh Barty (United States) CoCo Vandeweghe	(Hungary) Tímea Babos (France) Kristina Mladenovic	3–6, 7–6^{(7–2)}, 7–6^{(8–6)}

Category	Championship	Champions	Finalists	Score in the final
Mixed doubles	Australian Open	(Canada) Gabriela Dabrowski (Croatia) Mate Pavić	(Hungary) Tímea Babos (India) Rohan Bopanna	2–6, 6–4, 11–9
Mixed doubles	French Open	(Taiwan) Latisha Chan (Croatia) Ivan Dodig	(Canada) Gabriela Dabrowski (Croatia) Mate Pavić	6–1, 6–7^{(5–7)}, [10–8]
Mixed doubles	Wimbledon	(Austria) Alexander Peya (United States) Nicole Melichar	(United Kingdom) Jamie Murray (Belarus) Victoria Azarenka	7–6^{(7–1)}, 6–3
Mixed doubles	US Open	(United States) Bethanie Mattek-Sands (United Kingdom) Jamie Murray	(Poland) Alicja Rosolska (Croatia) Nikola Mektić	2–6, 6–3, 11–9

=== Davis Cup ===
First round 2–4 February
Albertville, France (indoor hard)
1	France	3
Netherlands	1
Morioka, Japan (indoor hard)
8	Italy	3
Japan	1
Marbella, Spain (clay)
3	Great Britain	1
Spain	3
Brisbane, Australia (hard)
6	Australia	1
Germany	3
Astana, Kazakhstan (indoor hard)
Kazakhstan	4
5	Switzerland	1
Osijek, Croatia (indoor clay)
Canada	1
4	Croatia	3
Niš, Serbia (indoor clay)
United States	3
7	Serbia	1
Liège, Belgium (indoor hard)
Hungary	2
2	Belgium	3

Quarterfinals; 6–8 April
Genoa, Italy (clay)
1	France	3
8	Italy	1
Valencia, Spain (clay)
Spain	3
Germany	2
Varaždin, Croatia (indoor clay)
Kazakhstan	1
4	Croatia	3
Nashville, United States (indoor hard)
United States	4
2	Belgium	0

Semifinals; 14–16 September
Lille, France (indoor hard)
1	France	3
Spain	2
Zadar, Croatia (clay)
4	Croatia	3
United States	2

Final; 23–25 November
Lille, France (indoor clay)
1	France	1
4	Croatia	3

=== Fed Cup ===
Quarterfinals; 10–11 February
Minsk, Belarus (hard, indoor)
1	Belarus	2
Germany	3
Prague, Czech Republic (hard, indoor)
3	Czech Republic	3
Switzerland	1
La Roche-sur-Yon, France (hard, indoor)
Belgium	2
4	France	3
Asheville, United States (hard, indoor)
Netherlands	1
2	United States	3

Semifinals; 21–22 April
Stuttgart, Germany (clay, indoor)
Germany	1
3	Czech Republic	4
Aix-en-Provence, France (clay, indoor)
4	France	2
2	United States	3

Final; 10–11 November
Prague, Czech Republic (hard, indoor)
3	Czech Republic	3
2	United States	0

== Other tennis events ==
- December 30, 2017 – January 6: 2018 Hopman Cup in (Australia) Perth
  - In the final, Switzerland defeated Germany, 2–1.
- September 21–23: 2018 Laver Cup in (United States) Chicago
  - Team Europe defeated Team World, 13–8, to win their second Laver Cup title.

== Non ATP or WTA tournaments ==
- December 23 & 24, 2017: 2017 World Tennis Thailand Championship Hua Hin
  - (Romania) Simona Halep defeated (Czech Republic) Karolína Plíšková, 6–2, 6–3. (United Kingdom) Johanna Konta took third place.
- December 28–30, 2017: 2017 Mubadala World Tennis Championship in (United Arab Emirates) Abu Dhabi
  - (South Africa) Kevin Anderson defeated (Spain) Roberto Bautista Agut 6–4, 7^{7}–6^{0}. (Austria) Dominic Thiem took third place.
- December 21–23: Hawaii Open in Honolulu

== Beach tennis ==
=== ITF Beach Tennis Tour ===
15, 000 $

- January 26–28: #1 in (Brazil) Santos
  - Men's doubles: (Russia) Nikita Burmakin & (Italy) Alessandro Calbucci
  - Women's doubles: (Italy) Flaminia Daina & (Venezuela) Patricia Diaz
- March 2–4: #2 in (Ecuador) Salinas
  - Men's doubles: (Italy) Tommaso Giovannini & (Italy) Andrea Stuto
  - Women's doubles: (Italy) Flaminia Daina & (Venezuela) Patricia Diaz
- March 16–18: #3 in (Réunion) Saint-Gilles
  - Men's doubles: (Italy) Michele Cappelletti & (Italy) Luca Carli
  - Women's doubles: (Italy) Sofia Cimatti & (Italy) Flaminia Daina
- April 21 & 22: #4 in (Spain) Las Palmas

10, 000 $

- January 5–7: #1 in (Italy) Monopoli
  - Men's doubles: (Italy) Mikael Alessi & (Spain) Antomi Ramos-Viera
  - Women's doubles: (Italy) Federica Bacchetta & (Italy) Giulia Gasparri
- February 3 & 4: #2 in (Brazil) Fortaleza
  - Men's doubles: (Italy) Alessandro Calbucci & (Italy) Michele Cappelletti
  - Women's doubles: (Germany) Maraike Biglmaier & (Brazil) Rafaella Miller
  - Mixed doubles: (Brazil) Lorena Melo & (Brazil) Miguel Duque de Souza
- March 30 – April 1: #3 in (Martinique) Le Carbet
  - Men's doubles: (Russia) Nikita Burmakin & (Russia) Sergey Kuptsov
  - Women's doubles: (United States) Nadia Johnston & (United States) Nicole Melch

6,500 $

- March 31 & April 1: #1 in (Italy) Roseto degli Abruzzi
  - Men's doubles: (Italy) Matteo Marighella & (Italy) Nicolò Strano
  - Women's doubles: (Italy) Veronica Casadei & (Italy) Nicole Nobile

2,500 $

- January 27 & 28: #1 in (France) Mougins
  - Men's doubles: (Italy) Gregorio Barison & (Italy) Antomi Ramos-Viera
  - Women's doubles: (Italy) Alessia Angelini & (Italy) Natascia Sciolti
- February 10 & 11: #2 in (Russia) Moscow
  - Men's doubles: (Russia) Nikita Burmakin & (Russia) Sergey Kuptsov
  - Women's doubles: (Russia) Ekaterina Kirgizova & (Russia) Regina Livanova
- February 17 & 18: #3 in (Italy) San Lazzaro di Savena
  - Men's doubles: (Italy) Luca Cramarossa & (Italy) Marco Garavini
  - Women's doubles: (Italy) Sofia Cimatti & (Italy) Flaminia Daina
- February 22 & 23: #4 in (Egypt) Marsa Alam
  - Men's doubles: (Portugal) Pedro Maio & (Germany) Alexander Bailer
  - Women's doubles: (Portugal) Manuela Cunha & (Russia) Angelina Gordienko
- February 24 & 25: #5 in (Netherlands) Nijmegen
  - Men's doubles: (Latvia) Maksimilians Niklass Andersons & (Russia) Nikita Burmakin
  - Women's doubles: (Russia) Julia Chubarova & (Russia) Ekaterina Kamenetckaia
- March 3 & 4: #6 in (Morocco) Casablanca
  - Men's doubles: (Italy) Dennis Valmori & (Italy) Diego Gallini
  - Women's doubles: (San Marino) Marika Colonna & (San Marino) Alice Grandi
- March 9 & 10: #7 in (Russia) Moscow
  - Men's doubles: (Russia) Nikita Burmakin & (Russia) Sergey Kuptsov
  - Women's doubles: (Russia) Daria Churakova & (Russia) Irina Glimakova
- March 9–11: #8 in (Réunion) Saint-Pierre
  - Men's doubles: (France) Romain Hoarau & (France) John Wolff
  - Women's doubles: (France) Mathilde Hoarau & (France) Elodie Vadel
- March 24 & 25: #9 in (Italy) Monopoli
  - Men's doubles: (Italy) Doriano Beccaccioli & (Italy) Davide Benussi
  - Women's doubles: (Italy) Veronica Casadei & (Italy) Nicole Nobile
