= 2017 in tennis =

This page covers all the important events in the sport of tennis in 2017. Primarily, it provides the results of notable tournaments throughout the year on both the ATP and WTA Tours, the Davis Cup, and the Fed Cup.

== ITF ==
=== Grand Slam events ===
Category	Championship	Champion	Finalist	Score in the final
Men's singles	Australian Open	(Switzerland) Roger Federer	(Spain) Rafael Nadal	6–4, 3–6, 6–1, 3–6, 6–3
Men's singles	French Open	(Spain) Rafael Nadal	(Switzerland) Stan Wawrinka	6–2, 6–3, 6–1
Men's singles	Wimbledon	(Switzerland) Roger Federer	(Croatia) Marin Čilić	6–3, 6–1, 6–4
Men's singles	US Open	(Spain) Rafael Nadal	(South Africa) Kevin Anderson	6–3, 6–3, 6–4

Category	Championship	Champion	Finalist	Score in the final
Women's singles	Australian Open	(United States) Serena Williams	(United States) Venus Williams	6–4, 6–4
Women's singles	French Open	(Latvia) Jeļena Ostapenko	(Romania) Simona Halep	4–6, 6–4, 6–3
Women's singles	Wimbledon	(Spain) Garbiñe Muguruza	(United States) Venus Williams	7–5, 6–0
Women's singles	US Open	(United States) Sloane Stephens	(United States) Madison Keys	6–3, 6–0

Category	Championship	Champions	Finalists	Score in the final
Men's doubles	Australian Open	(Finland) Henri Kontinen (Australia) John Peers	(United States) Bob Bryan (United States) Mike Bryan	7–5, 7–5
Men's doubles	French Open	(United States) Ryan Harrison (New Zealand) Michael Venus	(Mexico) Santiago González (United States) Donald Young	7–6^{(7–5)}, 6–7^{(4–7)}, 6–3
Men's doubles	Wimbledon	(Poland) Łukasz Kubot (Brazil) Marcelo Melo	(Austria) Oliver Marach (Croatia) Mate Pavić	5–7, 7–5, 7–6^{(7–2)}, 3–6, 13–11
Men's doubles	US Open	(Netherlands) Jean-Julien Rojer (Romania) Horia Tecău	(Spain) Feliciano López (Spain) Marc López	6–4, 6–3

Category	Championship	Champions	Finalists	Score in the final
Women's doubles	Australian Open	(United States) Bethanie Mattek-Sands (Czech Republic) Lucie Šafářová	(Czech Republic) Andrea Hlaváčková (China) Peng Shuai	6–7^{(4–7)}, 6–3, 6–3
Women's doubles	French Open	(United States) Bethanie Mattek-Sands (Czech Republic) Lucie Šafářová	(Australia) Ashleigh Barty (Australia) Casey Dellacqua	6–2, 6–1
Women's doubles	Wimbledon	(Russia) Ekaterina Makarova (Russia) Elena Vesnina	(Chinese Taipei) Chan Hao-ching (Romania) Monica Niculescu	6–0, 6–0
Women's doubles	US Open	(Chinese Taipei) Chan Yung-jan (Switzerland) Martina Hingis	(Czech Republic) Lucie Hradecká (Czech Republic) Kateřina Siniaková	6–3, 6–2

Category	Championship	Champions	Finalists	Score in the final
Mixed doubles	Australian Open	(United States) Abigail Spears (Colombia) Juan Sebastián Cabal	(India) Sania Mirza (Croatia) Ivan Dodig	6–2, 6–4
Mixed doubles	French Open	(Canada) Gabriela Dabrowski (India) Rohan Bopanna	(Germany) Anna-Lena Grönefeld (Colombia) Robert Farah	2–6, 6–2, [12–10]
Mixed doubles	Wimbledon	(United Kingdom) Jamie Murray (Switzerland) Martina Hingis	(Finland) Henri Kontinen (United Kingdom) Heather Watson	6–4, 6–4
Mixed doubles	US Open	(Switzerland) Martina Hingis (United Kingdom) Jamie Murray	(Chinese Taipei) Chan Hao-ching (New Zealand) Michael Venus	6–1, 4–6, [10–8]

=== Davis Cup ===
First round 3–5 February
Buenos Aires, Argentina (clay)
1	Argentina	2
Italy	3
Frankfurt, Germany (indoor hard)
7	Belgium	4
Germany	1
Kooyong, Australia (hard)
4	Czech Republic	1
Australia	4
Birmingham, United States (indoor hard)
5	Switzerland	0
United States	5
Tokyo, Japan (indoor hard)
Japan	1
6	France	4
Ottawa, Canada (indoor hard)
Canada	2
3	Great Britain	3
Niš, Serbia (indoor hard)
Russia	1
8	Serbia	4
Osijek, Croatia (indoor hard)
Spain	3
2	Croatia	2

Quarterfinals; 7–9 April
Charleroi, Belgium (indoor hard)
Italy	2
7	Belgium	3
Brisbane, Australia (hard)
Australia	3
United States	2
Rouen, France (indoor clay)
6	France	4
3	Great Britain	1
Belgrade, Serbia (indoor hard)
8	Serbia	4
Spain	1

Semifinals; 15–17 September
Belgium
7	Belgium	3
Australia	2
France
6	France	3
8	Serbia	1

Final; 24–26 November
France
7	Belgium	2
6	France	3

=== Fed Cup ===
Quarterfinals; 11–12 February
Ostrava, Czech Republic (hard, indoor)
1	Czech Republic	3
Spain	2
Maui, Hawaii, United States (hard, outdoor)
3	Germany	0
United States	4
Minsk, Belarus (hard, indoor)
Belarus	4
4	Netherlands	1
Geneva, Switzerland (hard, indoor)
Switzerland	4
2	France	1

Semifinals; 22–23 April
Tampa, United States (clay, outdoor)
1	Czech Republic	2
United States	3
Minsk, Belarus (hard, indoor)
Belarus	3
Switzerland	2

Final; 11–12 November
Minsk, Belarus (hard, indoor)
United States	3
Belarus	2

== Other tennis events ==
- September 22–24: 2017 Laver Cup in (Czech Republic) Prague
  - Team Europe defeated Team World, 15–9, to win their first Laver Cup title.

== Number-1-ranked players ==
=== Men's singles ===
Holder	Date gained	Date forfeited
Andy Murray (GBR)	Year end 2016	20 August 2017
Rafael Nadal (ESP)	21 August 2017	

=== Female singles ===
Holder	Date gained	Date forfeited
(Germany) Angelique Kerber	Year end 2016	29 January 2017
(United States) Serena Williams	30 January 2017	19 March 2017
(Germany) Angelique Kerber	20 March 2017	23 April 2017
(United States) Serena Williams	24 April 2017	14 May 2017
(Germany) Angelique Kerber	15 May 2017	16 July 2017
(Czech Republic) Karolína Plíšková	17 July 2017	10 September 2017
(Spain) Garbiñe Muguruza	11 September 2017	8 October 2017
(Romania) Simona Halep	9 October 2017	Incumbent

=== Men's doubles ===
Holder	Date gained	Date forfeited
Nicolas Mahut (FRA)	Year end 2016	2 April 2017
Henri Kontinen (FIN)	3 April 2017	16 July 2017
Marcelo Melo (BRA)	17 July 2017	20 August 2017
Henri Kontinen (FIN)	21 August 2017	5 November 2017
Marcelo Melo (BRA)	6 November 2017	Year end 2017

=== Female doubles ===
Holder	Date gained	Date forfeited
(India) Sania Mirza	Year end 2016	8 January 2017
(United States) Bethanie Mattek-Sands	9 January 2017	20 August 2017
(Czech Republic) Lucie Šafářová	21 August 2017	1 October 2017
(Switzerland) Martina Hingis	2 October 2017	Incumbent

== Beach tennis ==
=== Continental and world events ===
- July 10: 2017 ITF Beach Tennis World Team Championship in Moscow
  - In the final, Italy defeated Brazil, 2–0. Russia took third place and France fourth place.
- August 1–6: World Championships in (Italy) Cervia
  - Men's doubles: (Italy) Michele Cappelletti & Luca Carli
  - Women's doubles: (Italy) Federica Bacchetta & Giulia Gasparri
- October 8–10: 2017 ITF European Championships in (Bulgaria) Sozopol

=== ITF Beach Tennis Tour (only prize money) ===
Europe

- January 6–8: #1 in (Italy) Monopoli
  - Men's doubles: (Italy) Faccini Marco & Niccolò Strano
  - Women's doubles: (Italy) Sofia Cimatti & Flaminia Daina
- February 18 & 19 #2 in (Netherlands) Nijmegen
  - Men's doubles: (Greece) Ioannis Dimopoulos & (Italy) Massimo Mattei
  - Women's doubles: (Slovakia) Katarína Páleníková & (Italy) Natascia Sciolti
- February 18 & 19: #3 in (Italy) San Lazzaro di Savena
  - Men's doubles: (Italy) Michele Cappelletti & Luca Carli
  - Women's doubles: (Italy) Sofia Cimatti & Flaminia Daina
- April 22 & 23: #4 in (Italy) Cervia
  - Men's doubles: (Italy) Mikael Alessi & Alessio Chiodioni
  - Women's doubles: (Italy) Michela Romani & Noemi Romani
- April 29 & 30: #5 in (Cyprus) Larnaca
  - Men's doubles: (Italy) Gregorio Barison & Diego Bollettinari
  - Women's doubles: (Russia) Ekaterina Glazkova & Anna Romanova
- April 30 & May 1: #6 in (Italy) Lido degli Estensi #1
  - Men's doubles: (Italy) Nicolò Appiotti & Francesco Pesaresi
  - Women's doubles: (Italy) Federica Bacchetta & Giulia Gasparri
- May 20 & 21: #7 in (Portugal) Póvoa de Varzim
  - Men's doubles: (Spain) Gerard Rodriguez & (France) Thibaut François
  - Women's doubles: (Spain) Omayra Farías & Silvia Arroyo
- May 26–28: #8 in (Italy) Lignano Sabbiadoro
  - Men's doubles: (Italy) Luca Cramarossa & Marco Garavini
  - Women's doubles: (Italy) Sofia Cimatti & Flaminia Daina
- May 27 & 28: #9 in (Latvia) Jurmala
  - Men's doubles: (Spain) Gerard Rodriguez & (Greece) Ioannis Dimopoulos
  - Women's doubles: (Estonia) Anelle Luik & (Germany) Dorothee Berreth
- June 3 & 4: #10 in (Italy) Lido degli Estensi #2
  - Men's doubles: (Italy) Diego Bollettinari & Matteo Marighella
  - Women's doubles: (Italy) Sofia Cimatti & Flaminia Daina
- June 3: #11 in (Estonia) Viljandi
  - Men's doubles: (Estonia) Ainar Laube & Priit Pihl
  - Women's doubles: (Estonia) Anelle Luik & (Latvia) Anna Svaronoka
- June 4 & 5: #12 in (France) La Flèche
  - Men's doubles: (France) Jérôme Maillot & Jean Nouaux
  - Women's doubles: (France) Pauline Bourdet & Catherine Henuzet
- June 10 & 11: #13 in (Latvia) Liepāja
  - Men's doubles: (Russia) Nikolay Guryev & (Greece) Ioannis Dimopoulos
  - Women's doubles: (Russia) Liudmila Nikoyan & (Latvia) Irina Kuzmina-Rimša
- June 10 & 11: #14 in (France) Furiani
  - Men's doubles: (Italy) Patricio Pallara & Davide Fontana
  - Women's doubles: (Italy) Giorgia Gilardi & Elisa Cappelli
- June 17 & 18: #15 in (France) Sillery
  - Men's doubles: (France) Benjamin Gros & Jean Nouaux
  - Women's doubles: (France) Magali Garnier & (Italy) Natascia Sciolti
- June 17 & 18: #16 in (Italy) Ravenna
  - Men's doubles: (Italy) Luca Cramarossa & Marco Garavini
  - Women's doubles: (Italy) Federica Bacchetta & Giulia Gasparri
- June 18: #17 in (Germany) Ingelheim am Rhein
  - Men's doubles: (Germany) Benjamin Ringlstetter & Manuel Ringlstetter
  - Women's doubles: (Switzerland) Nadja Leuenberger & Sarah Leuenberger
- June 24 & 25: #18 in (France) Montauban
  - Men's doubles: (France) Régis Courtois & (Italy) Simone Burini
  - Women's doubles: (Italy) Elisa Cappelli & Giorgia Gilardi
- July 1 & 2: #18 in (Greece) Rhodes
  - Men's doubles: (Italy) Andrea Stuto & Simone Burini
  - Women's doubles: (Italy) Alessia Angelini & Natascia Sciolti
- July 1 & 2: #19 in (Italy) Fregene
  - Men's doubles: (Italy) Doriano Beccaccioli & Davide Benussi
  - Women's doubles: (Italy) Veronica Casadei & Nicole Nobile
- July 7–9: #20 in (Russia) Kazan
  - Men's doubles: (Italy) Luca Cramarossa & Marco Garavini
  - Women's doubles: (Italy) Sofia Cimatti & Flaminia Daina
- July 15–16: #21 in (Italy) Alba Adriatica
  - Men's doubles: (Italy) Tommaso Giovannini & Luca Meliconi
  - Women's doubles: (Italy) Maddalena Cini & Greta Giusti
- July 21 & 23: #22 in (Italy) Ugento
  - Men's doubles: (Italy) Alessandro Calbucci & Marco Garavini
  - Women's doubles: (Italy) Sofia Cimatti & Flaminia Daina
- July 22 & 23: #23 in (Slovenia) Preddvor
  - Men's doubles: (Italy) Alessandro Taccaliti & Mattia Spoto
  - Women's doubles: (Slovakia) Katarína Páleniková & (Italy) Giulia Curzi
- July 22 & 23: #24 in (Russia) Samara
  - Men's doubles: (Russia) Nikolay Guryev & Andrey Kozbinov
  - Women's doubles: (Russia) Ekaterina Kamenetckaia & Regina Livanova
- July 22 & 23: #25 in (France) Angoulême
  - Men's doubles: (Russia) Igor Panin & (Spain) Gerard Rodriguez-Querol
  - Women's doubles: (France) Catherine Henuzet & Capucine Rousseau
- July 28–30: #26 in (France) Frontignan
  - Men's doubles: (Italy) Gregorio Barison & Diego Bolletinari
  - Women's doubles: (Germany) Dorothee Berreth & (France) Julie Labrit
- July 29 & 30: #27 in (Italy) Torre del Lago
  - Men's doubles: (Italy) Luca Cramarossa & Marco Garavini
  - Women's doubles: (Italy) Sofia Cimatti & Flaminia Daina
- August 5 & 6: #28 in (Portugal) Faro
  - Men's doubles: (Portugal) Pedro Maio & Henrique Freitas
  - Women's doubles: (Portugal) Manuela Cunha & Ana Catarina Alexandrino
- August 6: #29 in (Poland) Dąbrowa Górnicza
  - Men's doubles: (Slovenia) Uroš Brinovec & (Austria) Daniel Kahr
  - Women's doubles: (Hungary) Aniko Kovacs & Monika Erdelyi
- August 19 & 20: #24 in (Germany) Ahlbeck

Africa

- February 17 & 18: #1 in (Egypt) Marsa Alam
  - Men's doubles: (Switzerland) Yves Fornasier & (Germany) Alexander Bailer
  - Women's doubles: (Switzerland) Laura Galli & (Portugal) Manuela Cunha
- March 11 & 12: #2 in (Réunion) Saint-Pierre
  - Men's doubles: (France) Romain Say & Philippe Vadel
  - Women's doubles: (France) Marie-Eve Hoarau & Mathilde Hoarau
- March 17–19: #3 in (Réunion) Saint-Gilles #1
  - Men's doubles: (Italy) Michele Cappelletti & Luca Carli
  - Women's doubles: (Italy) Federica Bacchetta & Giulia Gasparri
- March 18 & 19: #4 in (Egypt) Dahab
  - Men's doubles: (Greece) Georgios Karavasilis & (Germany) Oliver Munz
  - Women's doubles: (Russia) Daria Churakova & Angelina Gordienko
- April 15 & 16: #5 in (Morocco) Casablanca #1
  - Men's doubles: (Italy) Massimo Mattei & Dennis Valmori
- April 22 & 23: #6 in (Spain) Las Palmas
  - Men's doubles: (Italy) Luca Cramarossa & Marco Garavini
  - Women's doubles: (Italy) Flaminia Daina & Sofia Cimatti
- April 23 & 24: #7 in (Egypt) Cairo
  - Men's doubles: (Greece) Ioannis Dimopulos & Giorgos Martinis
  - Women's doubles: (Greece) Anastasia Kokkinou & Evaggelia Tsavou
- May 7 & 8: #8 in (Réunion) L'Étang-Salé
  - Men's doubles: (France) Mathieu Guegano & Ugo Quilici
  - Women's doubles: (France) Julia Coll & Elodie Vadel
- May 15 & 16: #9 in (Morocco) Casablanca #2
  - Men's doubles: (Italy) Marco Scudellari & Stefano Casadei
  - Women's doubles: (Russia) Angelina Gordienko & Yulia Chubarova
- May 20 & 21: #10 in (Morocco) Casablanca #3
  - Men's doubles: (Italy) Marco Scudellari & Stefano Casadei
  - Women's doubles: (Morocco) Sarah Benabdeljalil & Camilia Benabdeljalil
- May 27 & 28: #11 in (Réunion) Saint-Gilles #2
  - Men's doubles: (France) Frédéric Pamard & Théo Irigaray
  - Women's doubles: (France) Mathilde Hoareau & Marie-Eve Hoarau
- July 29 & 30: #12 in (Morocco) Tanger
  - Men's doubles: (Morocco) Adil Medina & (Puerto Rico) Javeir Mendez
  - Women's doubles: (Morocco) Camilia Benabdeljalil & Sarah Benabdeljalil

Asia

- April 1 & 2: #1 in (Japan) Fujisawa #1
  - Men's doubles: (Japan) Yusuke Hiraki & Susumu Kawashima
  - Women's doubles: (Japan) Eri Homma & Akiko Otani
- May 20 & 21: #2 in (Japan) Miura
  - Men's doubles: (Japan) Keita Iseki & Naoaki Yamamoto
  - Women's doubles: (Japan) Misa Miyasaka & Tomomi Takahashi
- May 27 & 28: #3 in (Japan) Fujisawa #2
  - Men's doubles: (Japan) Susumu Nakajima & Naoaki Yamamoto
  - Women's doubles: (Japan) Eri Homma & Akiko Otani
- July 1 & 2: #4 in (Japan) Fujisawa #3
  - Men's doubles: (Japan) Daisuke Tsuruoka & Naoaki Yamamoto
  - Women's doubles: (Japan) Eri Homma & Akiko Otani
- August 19 & 20: #5 in (Japan) Fukuoka

Central America

- April 8 & 9: #1 in (Collectivity of Saint Martin) Orient Bay
  - Men's doubles: (France) Mathieu Porry & Raphael Porry
  - Women's doubles: (Germany) Maraike Biglmaier & (Venezuela) Patricia Diaz
- April 14–16: #2 in (Guadeloupe) Le Moule
  - Men's doubles: (Russia) Nikita Burmakin & (Italy) Tommaso Giovannini
  - Women's doubles: (Germany) Maraike Biglmaier & (Venezuela) Patricia Diaz
- April 21–23: #3 in (Martinique) Le Carbet
  - Men's doubles: (Russia) Nikita Burmakin & (Italy) Tommaso Giovannini
  - Women's doubles: (Germany) Maraike Biglmaier & (Venezuela) Patricia Diaz
- May 26–28: #4 in (Puerto Rico) Carolina
  - Men's doubles: (Puerto Rico) Carlos Rivera & (Venezuela) Carlos Vigon
  - Women's doubles: (Venezuela) Lady Correa & (Canada) Marie-Pier Huet
- June 3–5: #5 in (Martinique) Schœlcher
  - Men's doubles: (Guatemala) Nicholas Giannotti & Maxence Tournebize
  - Women's doubles: (Collectivity of Saint Martin) Julie Labrit & (Guatemala) Alizé Ayassamy

South America

- March 3–5: #1 in (Ecuador) Salinas
  - Men's doubles: (Italy) Alessandro Calbucci & Michele Cappelletti
  - Women's doubles: (Italy) Sofia Cimatti & Flaminia Daina
- April 15 & 16: #2 in (Chile) Maitencillo
  - Men's doubles: (Chile) Vicente Brusadelli & Juan Pablo Ramirez
  - Women's doubles: (Argentina) Jessica Orselli & Belen Tejeda
- April 29 & 30: #3 in (Brazil) João Pessoa
  - Men's doubles: (Brazil) Ralff Abreu & Diogo Carneiro
  - Women's doubles: (Brazil) Joana Cortez & Rafaella Miiller
- May 6 & 7: #4 in (Brazil) Niterói
  - Men's doubles: (Italy) Luca Cramarossa & Marco Garavini
  - Women's doubles: (Brazil) Joana Cortez & Rafaella Miiller
- May 13 & 14: #5 in (Brazil) Balneário Camboriú
  - Men's doubles: (Brazil) Ralff Abreu & Diogo Carneiro
  - Women's doubles: (Brazil) Nathalia Font & Flávia Muniz
- May 20 & 21: #6 in (Brazil) Maceió
  - Men's doubles: (Brazil) Ralff Abreu & Diogo Carneiro
  - Women's doubles: (Brazil) Joana Cortez & Rafaella Miiller
- July 1 & 2: #7 in (Brazil) São Miguel do Gostoso
  - Men's doubles: (Brazil) Ralff Abreu & Diogo Carneiro
  - Women's doubles: (Brazil) Marilia Câmara & Lorena Melo
- August 4–6: #8 in (Brazil) Fortaleza
  - Men's doubles: (Brazil) Allan Oliveira & Adolfo Januário
  - Women's doubles: (Brazil) Flávia Muniz & Marilia Câmara

== International Tennis Hall of Fame ==
- Class of 2017:
  - Kim Clijsters, player
  - Monique Kalkman-Van Den Bosch, player
  - Andy Roddick, player
  - Vic Braden, contributor
  - Steve Flink, contributor
