= Nicole Melch =

American beach tennis player

- Country (sports): Austria; United States
- Born: April 29, 1978 (age 48)
- Plays: Right-handed
- Prize money: US$ 52,956

Singles
- Highest ranking: No. 293 (21 May 2001)

Doubles
- Highest ranking: No. 230 (09 July 2001)

Nicole Melch (born April 29, 1978) is an Austrian born beach tennis player and former professional player on the WTA Tour.

After retiring from professional tennis in 2004, Melch joined the ITF Beach Tennis Tour as a professional in 2005, winning national titles with her doubles partner Nadia Johnston who is currently competing for the United States.
