= 2001 Thalgo Australian Women's Hardcourts – Singles =

Coordinates: 27.8717°S 153.3504°E

Singles
- 2001 Thalgo Australian Women's Hardcourts

Final
- Champion: (Belgium) Justine Henin
- Runner-up: (Italy) Silvia Farina Elia
- Score: 7–6^{(7–5)}, 6–4

Details
- Draw: 30 (2WC/4Q)
- Seeds: 8

Events
Singles	Doubles
← 2000 ·	Australian Hard Court Championships	· 2002 →

The 2001 Thalgo Australian Women's Hardcourts singles was a tennis competition within the 2001 Thalgo Australian Women's Hardcourts, a tennis tournament played on outdoor hard courts at the Hope Island Resort Tennis Centre in Hope Island, Queensland in Australia and was part of Tier III of the 2001 WTA Tour. The tournament ran from 31 December 2000 through 6 January 2001.

Silvija Talaja was the defending champion but lost in the quarterfinals to Silvia Farina Elia.

Justine Henin won in the final 7–6^{(7–5)}, 6–4 against Farina Elia.

== Seeds ==
A champion seed is indicated in bold text while text in italics indicates the round in which that seed was eliminated. The top two seeds received a bye to the second round.

1. (Spain) Conchita Martínez (quarterfinals)
2. (Switzerland) Patty Schnyder (semifinals)
3. (Croatia) Silvija Talaja (quarterfinals)
4. (Russia) Tatiana Panova (first round)
5. (Spain) Magüi Serna (second round)
6. (United States) Meghann Shaughnessy (semifinals)
7. (Slovakia) Henrieta Nagyová (first round)
8. (Belgium) **Justine Henin (champion)**

== Draw ==
=== Key ===
- Q = Qualifier
- WC = Wild card
- LL = Lucky loser
- Alt = Alternate
- SE = Special exempt
- PR = Protected ranking
- ITF = ITF entry
- JE = Junior exempt
- w/o = Walkover
- r = Retired
- d = Defaulted
- SR = Special ranking

=== Final ===
Final
8	(Belgium) **Justine Henin**	**7^{7}**	**6**
	(Italy) Silvia Farina Elia	6^{5}	4

=== Top half ===
First round
(United States) B Rippner	4	**7^{7}**	3
(Italy) **G Casoni**	**6**	6^{5}	**6**
(Slovenia) T Pisnik	3	**6**	4
(United States) **S Cacic**	**6**	4	**6**
(Austria) S Plischke	**6**	2	2
6	(United States) **M Shaughnessy**	4	**6**	**6**
4	(Russia) T Panova	6^{6}	**6**	5
WC	(Australia) **C Wheeler**	**7^{8}**	1	**7**
(South Africa) **J Kruger**	**6**	**6**
Q	(Indonesia) W Prakusya	4	0
(Canada) **S Jeyaseelan**	**7**	**7^{7}**
Q	(Germany) B Rittner	5	6^{4}
(France) V Razzano	4	0
8	(Belgium) **J Henin**	**6**	**6**

Second round
1	(Spain) **C Martínez**	**6**	**6**
(Italy) G Casoni	4	4
(United States) S Cacic	4	2
6	(United States) **M Shaughnessy**	**6**	**6**
WC	(Australia) C Wheeler	2	**6**	4
(South Africa) **J Kruger**	**6**	4	**6**
(Canada) S Jeyaseelan	1	0
8	(Belgium) **J Henin**	**6**	**6**

Quarterfinals
1	(Spain) C Martínez	2	1
6	(United States) **M Shaughnessy**	**6**	**6**
(South Africa) J Kruger	1	1
8	(Belgium) **J Henin**	**6**	**6**

Semifinals
6	(United States) M Shaughnessy	2	**6**	2
8	(Belgium) **J Henin**	**6**	4	**6**

=== Bottom half ===
First round
5	(Spain) **M Serna**	**6**	**6**
(Russia) A Jidkova	4	2
(Italy) **S Farina Elia**	**6**	5	**6**
Q	(Germany) G Arn	4	**7**	4
(Spain) **Á Montolio**	**6**	**6**
(Hungary) R Kuti-Kis	2	1
(Sweden) Å Carlsson	**6**	3	4
3	(Croatia) **S Talaja**	4	**6**	**6**
7	(Slovakia) H Nagyová	2	5
(Germany) **J Kandarr**	**6**	**7**
(Germany) **A Glass**	**6**	**6**
WC	(Australia) E Dominikovic	3	4
(Croatia) I Majoli	**7^{7}**	1	6^{1}
Q	(Russia) **L Krasnoroutskaya**	6^{4}	**6**	**7^{7}**

Second round
5	(Spain) M Serna	4	2
(Italy) **S Farina Elia**	**6**	**6**
(Spain) Á Montolio	**6**	1	1
3	(Croatia) **S Talaja**	3	**6**	**6**
(Germany) J Kandarr	1	2
(Germany) **A Glass**	**6**	**6**
Q	(Russia) L Krasnoroutskaya	**6**	6^{5}	3
2	(Switzerland) **P Schnyder**	3	**7^{7}**	**6**

Quarterfinals
(Italy) **S Farina Elia**	**6**	**6**
3	(Croatia) S Talaja	3	2
(Germany) A Glass	1	3
2	(Switzerland) **P Schnyder**	**6**	**6**

Semifinals
(Italy) **S Farina Elia**	6^{8}	**6**	**6**
2	(Switzerland) P Schnyder	**7^{10}**	2	4

== Qualifying ==
=== Seeds ===
1. (United States) Marissa Irvin (first round)
2. (Italy) Giulia Casoni (withdrew, moved to the Main Draw)
3. (United States) Alexandra Stevenson (final round)
4. (Federal Republic of Yugoslavia) Sandra Načuk (second round)
5. (Germany) **Barbara Rittner (Qualifier)**
6. (Venezuela) Maria Vento (first round)
7. (Australia) Rachel McQuillan (first round)
8. (Chinese Taipei) Janet Lee (second round)
9. (Romania) Cătălina Cristea (second round)

=== Qualifiers ===
1. **(Indonesia) Wynne Prakusya**
2. **(Germany) Barbara Rittner**
3. **(Russia) Lina Krasnoroutskaya**
4. **(Germany) Gréta Arn**

=== Draw ===
==== First qualifier ====
First round
1	(United States) Marissa Irvin	5	5
(Germany) **Bianka Lamade**	**7**	**7**
(Hungary) Zsófia Gubacsi	5	0
(Australia) **Annabel Ellwood**	**7**	**6**
(Australia) Lisa McShea	3	4
(Indonesia) **Wynne Prakusya**	**6**	**6**
WC	(Australia) **Melissa Dowse**	4	**6**	**6**
6	(Venezuela) María Vento	**6**	2	3

Second round
(Germany) **Bianka Lamade**	**6**	**6**
(Australia) Annabel Ellwood	1	4
(Indonesia) **Wynne Prakusya**	**6**	**6**
WC	(Australia) Melissa Dowse	2	4

Final Round
(Germany) Bianka Lamade	6^{7}	**6**	2
(Indonesia) **Wynne Prakusya**	**7^{9}**	4	**6**

==== Second qualifier ====
First round
9	(Romania) **Cătălina Cristea**	**6**	**6**
WC	(Australia) Samantha Stosur	4	1
WC	(Australia) Trudi Musgrave	6^{3}	4
(Slovenia) **Maja Matevžič**	**7^{7}**	**6**
(Ukraine) **Tatiana Perebiynis**	**7^{7}**	**6**
(Kazakhstan) Irina Selyutina	6^{5}	3
(Australia) Kerry-Anne Guse	5	**6**	3
6	(Germany) **Barbara Rittner**	**7**	3	**6**

Second round
9	(Romania) Cătălina Cristea	1	2
(Slovenia) **Maja Matevžič**	**6**	**6**
(Ukraine) Tatiana Perebiynis	**6**	6^{5}	4
6	(Germany) **Barbara Rittner**	2	**7^{7}**	**6**

Final Round
(Slovenia) Maja Matevžič	0	1
6	(Germany) **Barbara Rittner**	**6**	**6**

==== Third qualifier ====
First round
3	(United States) **Alexandra Stevenson**	**6**	3	**6**
(Republic of Ireland) Kelly Liggan	4	**6**	1
(Slovenia) Tina Hergold	6^{6}	2
(Slovakia) **Janette Husárová**	**7^{8}**	**6**
(Australia) **Bryanne Stewart**	**6**	**6**
WC	(Australia) Nadia Johnston	3	0
(Russia) **Lina Krasnoroutskaya**	**6**	**7^{7}**
7	(Australia) Rachel McQuillan	1	6^{5}

Second round
3	(United States) **Alexandra Stevenson**	**6**	**7^{10}**
(Slovakia) Janette Husárová	1	6^{8}
(Australia) Bryanne Stewart	3	1
(Russia) **Lina Krasnoroutskaya**	**6**	**6**

Final Round
3	(United States) Alexandra Stevenson	2	0^{r}
(Russia) **Lina Krasnoroutskaya**	**6**	1

==== Fourth qualifier ====
First round
4	(Federal Republic of Yugoslavia) **Sandra Načuk**	**7^{7}**	**6**
(Bulgaria) Antoaneta Pandjerova	6^{3}	2
(Germany) **Gréta Arn**	**7**	**6**
(France) Laurence Andretto	5	2
(Australia) **Amanda Grahame**	6^{3}	**6**	**6**
(Canada) Renata Kolbovic	**7^{7}**	2	0
(Russia) Elena Bovina	6^{4}	4
8	(Chinese Taipei) **Janet Lee**	**7^{7}**	**6**

Second round
4	(Federal Republic of Yugoslavia) Sandra Načuk	1	**7**	1
(Germany) **Gréta Arn**	**6**	5	**6**
(Australia) **Amanda Grahame**	4	**6**	**6**
8	(Chinese Taipei) Janet Lee	**6**	4	4

Final Round
(Germany) **Gréta Arn**	**6**	**6**
(Australia) Amanda Grahame	4	3
