= 2000 Thalgo Australian Women's Hardcourts =

Coordinates: 28.0167°S 153.4°E

- Date: 2–8 January
- Edition: 4th
- Category: Tier III
- Draw: 30S / 16D
- Prize money: $170,000
- Surface: Hard / outdoor
- Location: Gold Coast, Australia

Champions

Singles
- (Croatia) Silvija Talaja

Doubles
- (France) Julie Halard-Decugis / (Russia) Anna Kournikova
← 1999 ·	Australian Hard Court Championships	· 2001 →

The 2000 Thalgo Australian Women's Hardcourts was a women's tennis tournament played on outdoor hard courts. It was the fourth edition of the event then known as the Thalgo Australian Women's Hardcourts, and was a Tier III event on the 2000 WTA Tour. It took place in Gold Coast, Queensland, Australia, from 2 January through 8 January 2000. Seventh-seeded Silvija Talaja won the singles title and earned $27,000 first-prize money.

== Finals ==
=== Singles ===
(Croatia) Silvija Talaja defeated (Spain) Conchita Martínez, 6–0, 0–6, 6–4

- It was Talaja's first singles title of her career.

=== Doubles ===
(France) Julie Halard-Decugis / (Russia) Anna Kournikova defeated (Belgium) Sabine Appelmans / (Italy) Rita Grande, 6–3, 6–0
