= 2002 Thalgo Australian Women's Hardcourts =

Coordinates: 28.0167°S 153.4°E

- Date: 30 December 2001 – 5 January 2002
- Edition: 6th
- Category: Tier III (WTA)
- Draw: 32S / 16D
- Prize money: $170,000
- Surface: Hard / outdoor
- Location: Gold Coast, Queensland

Champions

Singles
- (United States) Venus Williams

Doubles
- (Belgium) Justine Henin / (United States) Meghann Shaughnessy
← 2001 ·	Australian Hard Court Championships	· 2003 →

The 2002 Thalgo Australian Women's Hardcourts was a tennis tournament played on outdoor hard courts on the Gold Coast, Queensland in Australia that was part of Tier III of the 2002 WTA Tour. The tournament was held from 30 December 2001 through 5 January 2002. First-seeded Venus Williams won the singles title.

== Finals ==
=== Singles ===
(United States) Venus Williams defeated (Belgium) Justine Henin 7–5, 6–2

=== Doubles ===
(Belgium) Justine Henin / (United States) Meghann Shaughnessy defeated (Sweden) Åsa Svensson / (Netherlands) Miriam Oremans 6–1, 7–6^{(7–6)}
