= 2002 Thalgo Australian Women's Hardcourts – Singles =

Singles
- 2002 Thalgo Australian Women's Hardcourts

Final
- Champion: (United States) Venus Williams
- Runner-up: (Belgium) Justine Henin
- Score: 7–5, 6–2

Details
- Draw: 30
- Seeds: 8

Events
Singles	Doubles
← 2001 ·	Brisbane International	· 2003 →

Justine Henin was the defending champion, but lost in the final to Venus Williams 7–5, 6–2.

It was the 1st title in the season for Williams and the 22nd of her career.

== Seeds ==
The first two seeds received a bye into the second round.

1. (United States) Venus Williams (champion)
2. (Belgium) Justine Henin (final)
3. (France) Sandrine Testud (first round)
4. (United States) Meghann Shaughnessy (second round)
5. (Italy) Silvia Farina Elia (quarterfinals)
6. (Italy) Rita Grande (first round)
7. (Czech Republic) Dája Bedáňová (semifinals)
8. (Japan) Ai Sugiyama (quarterfinals)

== Draw ==
=== Key ===
- Q = Qualifier
- WC = Wild card
- LL = Lucky loser
- Alt = Alternate
- SE = Special exempt
- PR = Protected ranking
- ITF = ITF entry
- JE = Junior exempt
- w/o = Walkover
- r = Retired
- d = Defaulted
- SR = Special ranking

=== Finals ===
Semifinals
1	(United States) Venus Williams	7^{7}	6
(Russia) Nadia Petrova	6^{1}	5^{r}
7	(Czech Republic) Dája Bedáňová	2	2
2	(Belgium) Justine Henin	6	6

Final
1	(United States) Venus Williams	7	6
2	(Belgium) Justine Henin	5	2

=== Top half ===
First round
Q	(Czech Republic) K Koukalová	4	6	2
(Switzerland) P Schnyder	6	3	6
(Russia) A Myskina	6	6
WC	(Australia) S Stosur	2	0
(Germany) M Weingärtner	0	6	2
8	(Japan) A Sugiyama	6	4	6
4	(United States) M Shaughnessy	6	6
Q	(Spain) N Llagostera Vives	2	2
(Russia) N Petrova	6	6
(Spain) C Torrens Valero	2	1
(Kazakhstan) I Selyutina	2	4
Q	(South Korea) Y-j Cho	6	6
(France) É Loit	2	6	3
5	(Italy) S Farina Elia	6	4	6

Second round
1	(United States) V Williams	6	6
(Switzerland) P Schnyder	0	4
(Russia) A Myskina	5	3
8	(Japan) A Sugiyama	7	6
4	(United States) M Shaughnessy	4	6	3
(Russia) N Petrova	6	4	6
Q	(South Korea) Y-j Cho	6^{5}	6	3
5	(Italy) S Farina Elia	7^{7}	4	6

Quarterfinals
1	(United States) V Williams	6	6
8	(Japan) A Sugiyama	2	4
(Russia) N Petrova	7^{7}	7
5	(Italy) S Farina Elia	6^{4}	5

Semifinals
1	(United States) V Williams	7^{7}	6
(Russia) N Petrova	6^{1}	5^{r}

=== Bottom half ===
First round
7	(Czech Republic) D Bedáňová	6	6
WC	(Australia) C Wheeler	4	4
(South Africa) J Kruger	4	6	6
(Croatia) I Majoli	6	4	3
(Russia) E Likhovtseva	6	1	6
(United States) A Stevenson	2	6	4
(Slovenia) T Pisnik	6	7
3	(France) S Testud	4	5
6	(Italy) R Grande	3	6	2
Q	(Germany) A Barna	6	1	6
(Australia) N Pratt	6	6
(United States) L Osterloh	2	1
(Germany) B Lamade	1	5
(Slovakia) D Hantuchová	6	7

Second round
7	(Czech Republic) D Bedáňová	3	7	6
(South Africa) J Kruger	6	5	2
(Russia) E Likhovtseva	3	4
(Slovenia) T Pisnik	6	6
Q	(Germany) A Barna	6	2	6
(Australia) N Pratt	3	6	1
(Slovakia) D Hantuchová	6	0	3
2	(Belgium) J Henin	1	6	6

Quarterfinals
7	(Czech Republic) D Bedáňová	6	3
(Slovenia) T Pisnik	1	0^{r}
Q	(Germany) A Barna	2	1
2	(Belgium) J Henin	6	6

Semifinals
7	(Czech Republic) D Bedáňová	2	2
2	(Belgium) J Henin	6	6
