= 2001 Thalgo Australian Women's Hardcourts – Doubles =

Coordinates: 27.8717°S 153.3504°E

Doubles
- 2001 Thalgo Australian Women's Hardcourts

Final
- Champions: (Italy) Giulia Casoni (Slovakia) Janette Husárová
- Runners-up: (United States) Katie Schlukebir (United States) Meghann Shaughnessy
- Score: 7–6^{(11–9)}, 7–5

Details
- Draw: 16 (1WC/1Q)
- Seeds: 4

Events
Singles	Doubles
← 2000 ·	Australian Hard Court Championships	· 2002 →

The 2001 Thalgo Australian Women's Hardcourts doubles was a tennis competition within the 2001 Thalgo Australian Women's Hardcourts, a tennis tournament played on outdoor hard courts at the Hope Island Resort Tennis Centre in Hope Island, Queensland in Australia and was part of Tier III of the 2001 WTA Tour. The tournament ran from 31 December 2000 through 6 January 2001.

Julie Halard-Decugis and Anna Kournikova were the defending champions but did not compete that year.

Giulia Casoni and Janette Husárová won in the final 7–6^{(11–9)}, 7–5 against Katie Schlukebir and Meghann Shaughnessy.

== Seeds ==
Champion seeds are indicated in bold text while text in italics indicates the round in which those seeds were eliminated.

1. (Romania) Cătălina Cristea / (Kazakhstan) Irina Selyutina (quarterfinals)
2. (Sweden) Åsa Carlsson / (Italy) Silvia Farina Elia (quarterfinals)
3. (United States) Katie Schlukebir / (United States) Meghann Shaughnessy (final)
4. (Switzerland) Patty Schnyder / (Spain) Magüi Serna (semifinals)

== Draw ==
=== Key ===
- Q = Qualifier
- WC = Wild card
- LL = Lucky loser
- Alt = Alternate
- SE = Special exempt
- PR = Protected ranking
- ITF = ITF entry
- JE = Junior exempt
- w/o = Walkover
- r = Retired
- d = Defaulted
- SR = Special ranking

First round
1	(Romania) **C Cristea** (Kazakhstan) **I Selyutina**	**6**	1	**6**
(Australia) R McQuillan (Australia) L McShea	4	**6**	3
(Federal Republic of Yugoslavia) S Načuk (Slovenia) T Pisnik	5	**7^{7}**	0
(Croatia) **I Majoli** (Austria) **S Plischke**	**7**	6^{4}	**6**
3	(United States) **K Schlukebir** (United States) **M Shaughnessy**	**6**	3	**6**
(South Africa) N de Villiers (Australia) A Ellwood	2	**6**	1
(Slovakia) H Nagyová (United States) B Rippner	2	**6**	4
(Canada) **S Jeyaseelan** (Canada) **R Kolbovic**	**6**	2	**6**
Q	(Russia) **E Bovina** (Russia) **L Krasnoroutskaya**	**6**	**6**
(United States) S Cacic (Russia) A Jidkova	1	1
(Germany) B Rittner (Argentina) P Tarabini	4	6^{4}
4	(Switzerland) **P Schnyder** (Spain) **M Serna**	**6**	**7^{7}**
WC	(Australia) E Dominikovic (United States) A Stevenson	3	2
(Italy) **G Casoni** (Slovakia) **J Husárová**	**6**	**6**
(Germany) A Glass (Germany) B Lamade	5	4
2	(Sweden) **Å Carlsson** (Italy) **S Farina Elia**	**7**	**6**

Quarterfinals
1	(Romania) C Cristea (Kazakhstan) I Selyutina	4	6^{5}
(Croatia) **I Majoli** (Austria) **S Plischke**	**6**	**7^{7}**
3	(United States) **K Schlukebir** (United States) **M Shaughnessy**	4	**6**	**6**
(Canada) S Jeyaseelan (Canada) R Kolbovic	**6**	3	2
Q	(Russia) E Bovina (Russia) L Krasnoroutskaya	6^{4}	**7**	6^{7}
4	(Switzerland) **P Schnyder** (Spain) **M Serna**	**7^{7}**	5	**7^{9}**
(Italy) **G Casoni** (Slovakia) **J Husárová**	**6**	**6**
2	(Sweden) Å Carlsson (Italy) S Farina Elia	4	3

Semifinals
(Croatia) I Majoli (Austria) S Plischke	**6**	3	3
3	(United States) **K Schlukebir** (United States) **M Shaughnessy**	1	**6**	**6**
4	(Switzerland) P Schnyder (Spain) M Serna	4	4
(Italy) **G Casoni** (Slovakia) **J Husárová**	**6**	**6**

Final
3	(United States) Katie Schlukebir (United States) Meghann Shaughnessy	6^{9}	5
(Italy) **Giulia Casoni** (Slovakia) **Janette Husárová**	**7^{11}**	**7**

== Qualifying ==
=== Seeds ===
1. (Australia) Trudi Musgrave / (Australia) Bryanne Stewart (second round)
2. (Chinese Taipei) Janet Lee / (Indonesia) Wynne Prakusya (final round)

=== Qualifiers ===
1. **(Russia) Elena Bovina / (Russia) Lina Krasnoroutskaya**

==== Draw ====
- NB: The first two rounds used the pro set format.

First round
1	(Australia) **Trudi Musgrave** (Australia) **Bryanne Stewart**	**8**
(Republic of Ireland) Kelly Liggan (Venezuela) María Vento	1
WC	(Australia) Kerry-Anne Guse (Australia) Christina Wheeler	7
(Russia) **Elena Bovina** (Russia) **Lina Krasnoroutskaya**	**9**
(Germany) **Gréta Arn** (Australia) **Amanda Grahame**	**8**
(Germany) Jana Kandarr (France) Virginie Razzano	3
(Slovenia) Tina Hergold (Slovenia) Maja Matevžič	4
2	(Chinese Taipei) **Janet Lee** (Indonesia) **Wynne Prakusya**	**8**

Second round
1	(Australia) Trudi Musgrave (Australia) Bryanne Stewart	2
(Russia) **Elena Bovina** (Russia) **Lina Krasnoroutskaya**	**8**
(Germany) Gréta Arn (Australia) Amanda Grahame	3
2	(Chinese Taipei) **Janet Lee** (Indonesia) **Wynne Prakusya**	**8**

Final Round
(Russia) **Elena Bovina** (Australia) **Lina Krasnoroutskaya**	2	**6**	**6**
2	(Chinese Taipei) Janet Lee (Indonesia) Wynne Prakusya	**6**	3	0
