= 2002 Thalgo Australian Women's Hardcourts – Doubles =

Doubles
- 2002 Thalgo Australian Women's Hardcourts

Final
- Champions: (Belgium) Justine Henin (United States) Meghann Shaughnessy
- Runners-up: (Sweden) Åsa Carlsson (Netherlands) Miriam Oremans
- Score: 6–1, 7–6^{(8–6)}

Events
Singles	Doubles
← 2001 ·	Australian Hard Court Championships	· 2003 →

Giulia Casoni and Janette Husárová were the reigning champions, but did not compete this year.

Justine Henin and Meghann Shaughnessy won the title by defeating Åsa Carlsson and Miriam Oremans 6–1, 7–6^{(8–6)} in the final. It was the 1st title for Henin and the 3rd title for Shaughnessy in their respective doubles careers.

== Seeds ==
1. (Russia) Elena Likhovtseva / (Japan) Ai Sugiyama (semifinals)
2. (France) Sandrine Testud / (Italy) Roberta Vinci (quarterfinals)
3. (Belgium) Els Callens / (Australia) Nicole Pratt (quarterfinals)
4. (Belgium) Justine Henin / (United States) Meghann Shaughnessy (champions)

== Draw ==
=== Key ===
- Q = Qualifier
- WC = Wild card
- LL = Lucky loser
- Alt = Alternate
- SE = Special exempt
- PR = Protected ranking
- ITF = ITF entry
- JE = Junior exempt
- w/o = Walkover
- r = Retired
- d = Defaulted
- SR = Special ranking

=== Draw ===
First round
1	(Russia) E Likhovtseva (Japan) A Sugiyama	4	7	6
(South Africa) J Kruger (France) E Loit	6	5	3
Q	(Australia) B Stewart (Australia) C Wheeler	4	4
(Czech Republic) D Bedáňová (Croatia) I Majoli	6	6
4	(Belgium) J Henin (United States) M Shaughnessy	6	5	7
(Russia) E Bovina (Slovakia) D Hantuchová	0	7	5
(United States) K Schlukebir (Ukraine) E Tatarkova	3	7^{9}	6
WC	(Australia) E Dominikovic (Australia) S Stosur	6	6^{7}	3
(Italy) T Garbin (Italy) R Grande	1	5
(Netherlands) M Oremans (Sweden) Å Carlsson	6	7
(Germany) B Lamade (Switzerland) P Schnyder	2	6	3
3	(Belgium) E Callens (Australia) N Pratt	6	4	6
(Italy) S Farina Elia (Russia) N Petrova	7^{8}	7^{7}
(South Africa) N de Villiers (Kazakhstan) I Selyutina	6^{6}	6^{1}
(Australia) L McShea (Japan) N Miyagi	6	4	3
2	(France) S Testud (Italy) R Vinci	1	6	6

Quarterfinals
1	(Russia) E Likhovtseva (Japan) A Sugiyama	6	6
(Czech Republic) D Bedáňová (Croatia) I Majoli	4	4
4	(Belgium) J Henin (United States) M Shaughnessy	6	6
(United States) K Schlukebir (Ukraine) E Tatarkova	2	2
(Netherlands) M Oremans (Sweden) Å Carlsson	6	3	6
3	(Belgium) E Callens (Australia) N Pratt	3	6	4
(Italy) S Farina Elia (Russia) N Petrova	6	6
2	(France) S Testud (Italy) R Vinci	2	1

Semifinales
1	(Russia) E Likhovtseva (Japan) A Sugiyama	1	2
4	(Belgium) J Henin (United States) M Shaughnessy	6	6
(Netherlands) M Oremans (Sweden) Å Carlsson	w/o
(Italy) S Farina Elia (Russia) N Petrova

Final
4	(Belgium) J Henin (United States) M Shaughnessy	6	7^{8}
(Netherlands) M Oremans (Sweden) Å Carlsson	1	6^{6}
