= 2000 Thalgo Australian Women's Hardcourts – Doubles =

Doubles
- 2000 Thalgo Australian Women's Hardcourts

Final
- Champions: (France) Julie Halard-Decugis (Russia) Anna Kournikova
- Runners-up: (Belgium) Sabine Appelmans (Italy) Rita Grande
- Score: 6–3, 6–0

Events
| Singles | Doubles |
| ← 1999 · | Australian Hard Court Championships | · 2001 → |

Corina Morariu and Larisa Neiland were the reigning champions, but none competed this year.

Julie Halard-Decugis and Anna Kournikova won the title by defeating Sabine Appelmans and Rita Grande 6–3, 6–0 in the final.

== Seeds ==
1. (France) Julie Halard-Decugis / (Russia) Anna Kournikova (champions)
2. (Switzerland) Patty Schnyder / (Argentina) Patricia Tarabini (quarterfinals)
3. (Kazakhstan) Irina Selyutina / (Ukraine) Elena Tatarkova (semifinals)
4. (Czech Republic) Květa Hrdličková / (Germany) Barbara Rittner (first round)

== Draw ==
=== Key ===
- Q = Qualifier
- WC = Wild card
- LL = Lucky loser
- Alt = Alternate
- SE = Special exempt
- PR = Protected ranking
- ITF = ITF entry
- JE = Junior exempt
- w/o = Walkover
- r = Retired
- d = Defaulted
- SR = Special ranking

=== Draw ===
First round
1 | (France) J Halard-Decugis (Russia) A Kournikova | 6 | 6
(Spain) A Sánchez Vicario (Spain) M Serna | 2 | 2
(United States) D Graham (Japan) M Miyagi | 5 | 7^{7} | 6^{4}
WC | (Australia) T Musgrave (Australia) B Stewart | 7 | 6^{4} | 7^{7}
3 | (Kazakhstan) I Selyutina (Ukraine) E Tatarkova | 6 | 6
(Australia) KA Guse (Australia) K Kunce | 1 | 1
(Canada) S Jeyaseelan (Germany) J Kandarr | 1 | 6 | 7^{12}
(Federal Republic of Yugoslavia) S Načuk (Slovenia) T Pisnik | 6 | 2 | 6^{10}
(Australia) A Ellwood (Japan) R Hiraki | 4 | 1
(Australia) R McQuillan (Australia) L McShea | 6 | 6
(Belgium) S Appelmans (Italy) R Grande | 4 | 6 | 6
4 | (Czech Republic) K Hrdličková (Germany) B Rittner | 6 | 4 | 2
(United States) N Arendt (Australia) A Molik | 7 | 6
Q | (Russia) A Jidkova (Croatia) S Talaja | 5 | 4
(United States) E deLone (Australia) N Pratt | 3 | 6 | 2
2 | (Switzerland) P Schnyder (Argentina) P Tarabini | 6 | 1 | 6

Quarterfinals
1 | (France) J Halard-Decugis (Russia) A Kournikova | 7^{9} | 1 | 6
WC | (Australia) T Musgrave (Australia) B Stewart | 6^{7} | 6 | 0
3 | (Kazakhstan) I Selyutina (Ukraine) E Tatarkova | 6 | 6
(Canada) S Jeyaseelan (Germany) J Kandarr | 2 | 3
(Australia) R McQuillan (Australia) L McShea | 4 | 5
(Belgium) S Appelmans (Italy) R Grande | 6 | 7
(United States) N Arendt (Australia) A Molik | 6 | 6
2 | (Switzerland) P Schnyder (Argentina) P Tarabini | 3 | 1

Semifinals
1 | (France) J Halard-Decugis (Russia) A Kournikova | 6 | 3 | 6
3 | (Kazakhstan) I Selyutina (Ukraine) E Tatarkova | 2 | 6 | 1
(Belgium) S Appelmans (Italy) R Grande | 6 | 6
(United States) N Arendt (Australia) A Molik | 4 | 3

Final
1 | (France) J Halard-Decugis (Russia) A Kournikova | 6 | 6
(Belgium) S Appelmans (Italy) R Grande | 3 | 0
