= 2000 Thalgo Australian Women's Hardcourts – Singles =

Singles
- 2000 Thalgo Australian Women's Hardcourts

Final
- Champion: (Croatia) Silvija Talaja
- Runner-up: (Spain) Conchita Martínez
- Score: 6–0, 0–6, 6–4

Details
- Draw: 30
- Seeds: 8

Events
Singles	Doubles
← 1999 ·	Australian Hard Court Championships	· 2001 →

Patty Schnyder was the defending champion, but lost in the quarterfinals to Arantxa Sánchez Vicario.

Silvija Talaja won the title by defeating Conchita Martínez 6–0, 0–6, 6–4 in the final.

== Seeds ==
The top two seeds received a bye into the second round.

1. (France) Julie Halard-Decugis (second round)
2. (Russia) Anna Kournikova (quarterfinals)
3. (Spain) Conchita Martínez (final)
4. (Spain) Arantxa Sánchez Vicario (semifinals)
5. (Switzerland) Patty Schnyder (quarterfinals)
6. (France) Nathalie Dechy (semifinals)
7. (Croatia) Silvija Talaja (champion)
8. (Belgium) Sabine Appelmans (quarterfinals)

== Draw ==
=== Key ===
- Q = Qualifier
- WC = Wild card
- LL = Lucky loser
- Alt = Alternate
- SE = Special exempt
- PR = Protected ranking
- ITF = ITF entry
- JE = Junior exempt
- w/o = Walkover
- r = Retired
- d = Defaulted
- SR = Special ranking

=== Finals ===
Semifinals
6	(France) Nathalie Dechy	3	1
3	(Spain) Conchita Martínez	6	6
4	(Spain) Arantxa Sánchez Vicario	1	6	0
7	(Croatia) Silvija Talaja	6	3	6

Final
3	(Spain) Conchita Martínez	0	6	4
7	(Croatia) Silvija Talaja	6	0	6

=== Top half ===
First round
(Bulgaria) M Maleeva	6	6
WC	(Australia) A Molik	0	1
Q	(Italy) T Garbin	6	6
(Poland) M Grzybowska	2	3
(Australia) N Pratt	0	2
6	(France) N Dechy	6	6
3	(Spain) C Martínez	6	6
(Austria) S Plischke	3	4
(Spain) M Serna	4	6	1
(Germany) B Rittner	6	4	6
Q	(Russia) A Jidkova	6^{4}	7^{9}	4
(France) A Cocheteux	7^{7}	6^{7}	6
(United States) E deLone	4	5
8	(Belgium) S Appelmans	6	7

Second round
1	(France) J Halard-Decugis	0	1
(Bulgaria) M Maleeva	6	6
Q	(Italy) T Garbin	3	3
6	(France) N Dechy	6	6
3	(Spain) C Martínez	6	1
(Germany) B Rittner	2	0^{r}
(France) A Cocheteux	2	4
8	(Belgium) S Appelmans	6	6

Quarterfinals
(Bulgaria) M Maleeva	4	7^{7}	6^{6}
6	(France) N Dechy	6	6^{2}	7^{8}
3	(Spain) C Martínez	7^{7}	4	6
8	(Belgium) S Appelmans	6^{3}	6	4

Semifinals
6	(France) N Dechy	3	1
3	(Spain) C Martínez	6	6

=== Bottom half ===
First round
5	(Switzerland) P Schnyder	1	7^{7}	6
LL	(Canada) S Jeyaseelan	6	6^{3}	3
Q	(Australia) R McQuillan	6	6^{5}	3
(Russia) T Panova	2	7^{7}	6
WC	(Australia) A Ellwood	6	0	2
(Italy) R Grande	2	6	6
(Spain) Á Montolio	1	1
4	(Spain) A Sánchez Vicario	6	6
7	(Croatia) S Talaja	6	6
(United States) N Arendt	3	1
(Belgium) L Courtois	6	3	2
(Czech Republic) K Hrdličková	2	6	6
(Slovenia) T Pisnik	6^{1}	3
Q	(Germany) J Kandarr	7^{7}	6

Second round
5	(Switzerland) P Schnyder	6	6
(Russia) T Panova	3	1
(Italy) R Grande	3	1
4	(Spain) A Sánchez Vicario	6	6
7	(Croatia) S Talaja	7^{8}	7
(Czech Republic) K Hrdličková	6^{6}	5
Q	(Germany) J Kandarr	1^{r}
2	(Russia) A Kournikova	6

Quarterfinals
5	(Switzerland) P Schnyder	6	6^{2}	3
4	(Spain) A Sánchez Vicario	2	7^{7}	6
7	(Croatia) S Talaja	4	6	6
2	(Russia) A Kournikova	6	4	2

Semifinals
4	(Spain) A Sánchez Vicario	1	6	0
7	(Croatia) S Talaja	6	3	6
