= Nadia Johnston =

Australian beach tennis player

- Country (sports): Australia; United States
- Born: October 23, 1977 (age 47); Maryborough, Queensland, Australia
- Plays: Right-handed
- Prize money: $30,476

Singles
- Highest ranking: No. 314 (April 30, 2001)

Doubles
- Highest ranking: No. 245 (April 9, 2001)

Nadia Johnston (born October 23, 1977) is an Australian born beach tennis player and former professional player on the WTA Tour.

== Biography ==
Originally from the Queensland city of Maryborough, Johnston began competing on the ITF circuit in the late 1990s. In 2000 she won an ITF singles title at Tampico and a $25,000 doubles title at Mount Pleasant. She took part in the qualifying draw for the 2001 Australian Open and reached her best singles ranking that year of 314 in the world. Her professional tennis career was curtailed by a wrist injury.

Johnston, who moved to New York in 2003 to coach tennis, began touring on the professional ITF Beach Tennis Tour in 2005, winning several national titles. She now competes for the United States.

== ITF finals ==
$25,000 tournaments
$10,000 tournaments

=== Singles (1–1) ===
Outcome	No.	Date	Tournament	Surface	Opponent	Score
Runner-up	1.	9 May 1999	Poza Rica, Mexico	Hard	(Brazil) Joana Cortez	3–6, 6–3, 2–6
Winner	1.	8 May 2000	Tampico, Mexico	Hard	(Uruguay) Daniela Olivera	6–3, 6–0

=== Doubles (1–5) ===
Outcome	No.	Date	Tournament	Surface	Partner	Opponents	Score
Runner-up	1.	3 May 1999	Poza Rica, Mexico	Hard	(Australia) Nicole Sewell	(Argentina) Paula Racedo (Switzerland) Aliénor Tricerri	1–6, 6–7^{(5–7)}
Runner-up	2.	1 August 1999	Baltimore, United States	Hard	(United States) Candice de la Torre	(United States) Lauren Kalvaria (Canada) Marie-Ève Pelletier	6–7^{(5–7)}, 3–6
Runner-up	3.	21 May 2000	Poza Rica, Mexico	Hard	(United States) Candice de la Torre	(Mexico) Melody Falcó (Brazil) Carla Tiene	6–4, 2–6, 3–6
Winner	1.	18 June 2000	Mount Pleasant, United States	Hard	(Australia) Melanie Clayton	(Croatia) Maja Palaveršić (United States) Jacqueline Trail	4–6, 6–3, 6–2
Runner-up	4.	29 October 2000	Dalby, Australia	Hard	(Australia) Melanie Clayton	(Australia) Kerry-Anne Guse (Australia) Rachel McQuillan	0–3, ret.
Runner-up	5.	5 March 2001	Warrnambool, Australia	Grass	(India) Manisha Malhotra	(Romania) Simona Arghire (Japan) Remi Uda	3–6, 3–6
