= Saint-Gilles, Réunion =

Coordinates: 21°2′56″S 55°16′9″E

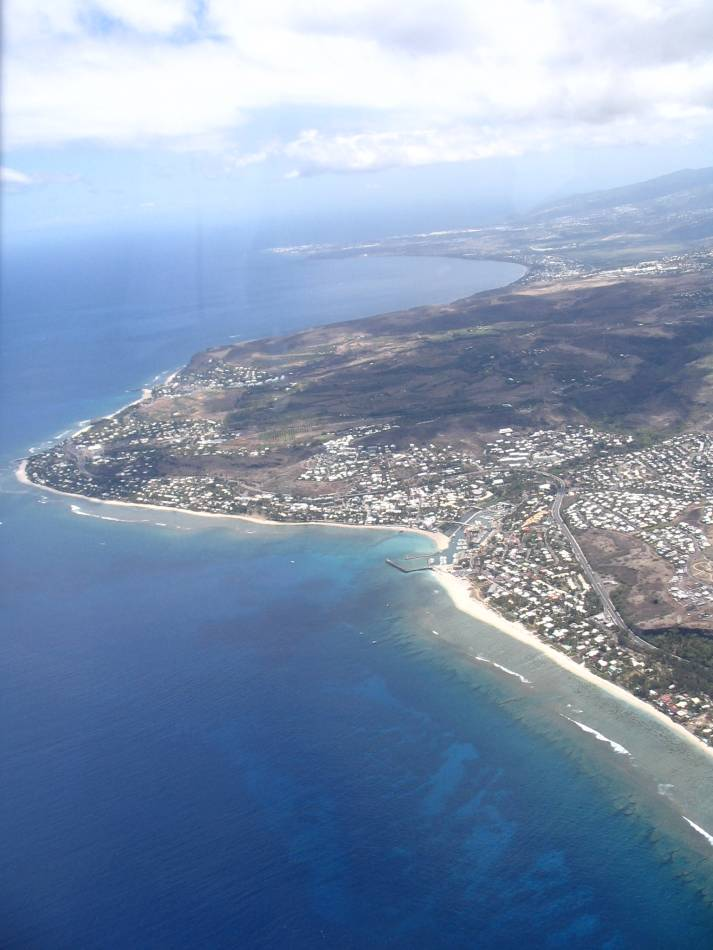
Saint-Gilles-les-Bains, the seaside resort of Saint-Gilles

Saint-Gilles is a village located along the west coast of the island of Réunion, in the commune of Saint-Paul. It is the site of the island's most popular seaside resort.

== Beaches ==
Boucan Canot and Roches Noires are popular surfing spots. Hermitage Beach is protected by a coral reef and is part of the protected area of the marine park of Réunion.

== other attractions ==
- the Casino of Saint-Gilles
- The Garden of Eden - a botanical garden
- the sea aquarium inside of the port of Saint-Gilles
- the waterfalls of Saint-Gilles river at Bassin Cormorans and Aigrettes
- whale watching targeting especially for Humpback whales, organized by the OMAR (Observatoire Marin de la Réunion) and Globice (Groupe local d'observation et d'identification des cétacés)
- the Grand Boucan - a carnival-like popular party that takes place in June.
- Grotte de l’Autel, a cave discovered in 1980. Known for its subfossil remains of extinct birds.
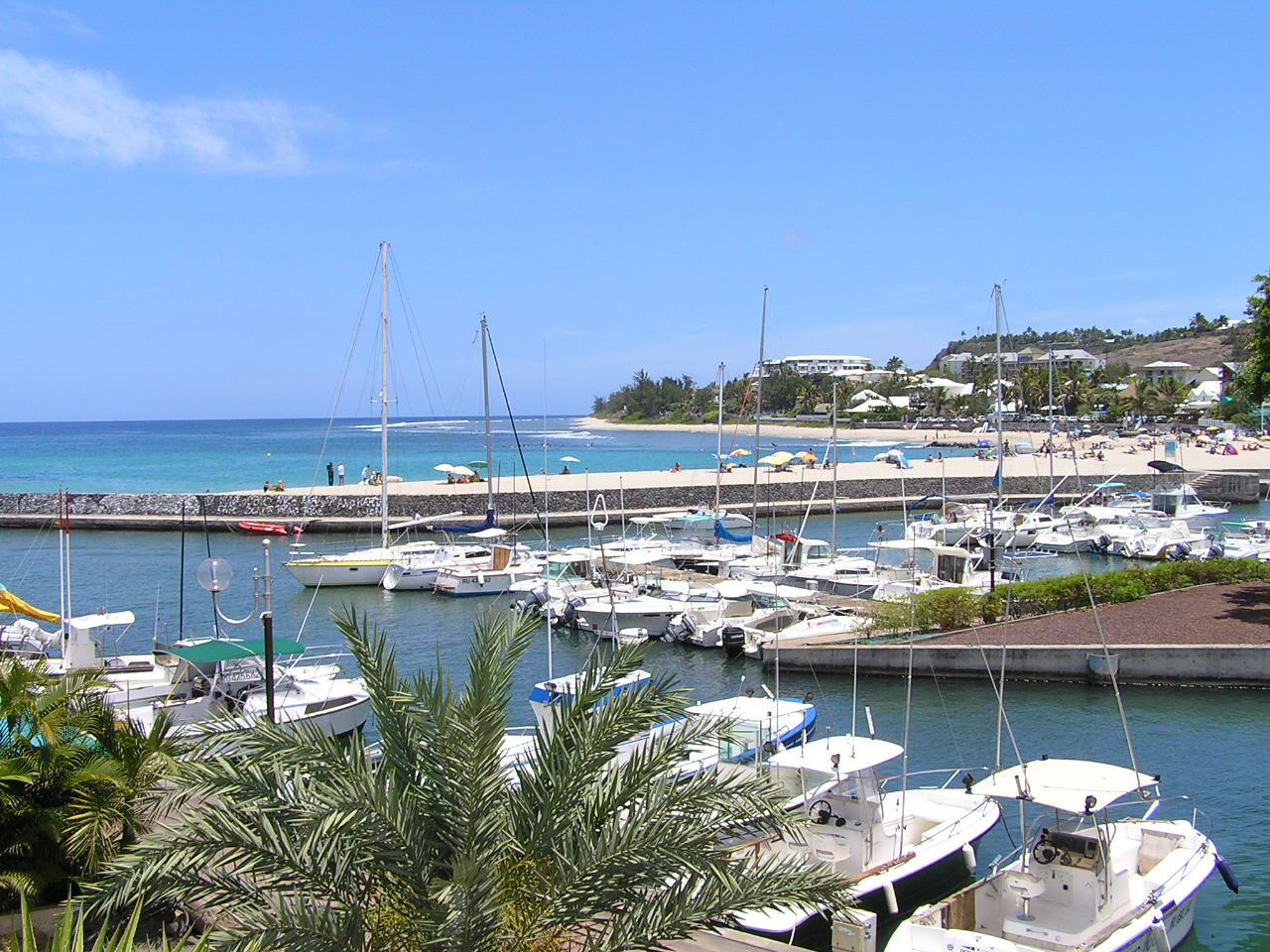
Port of Saint-Gilles

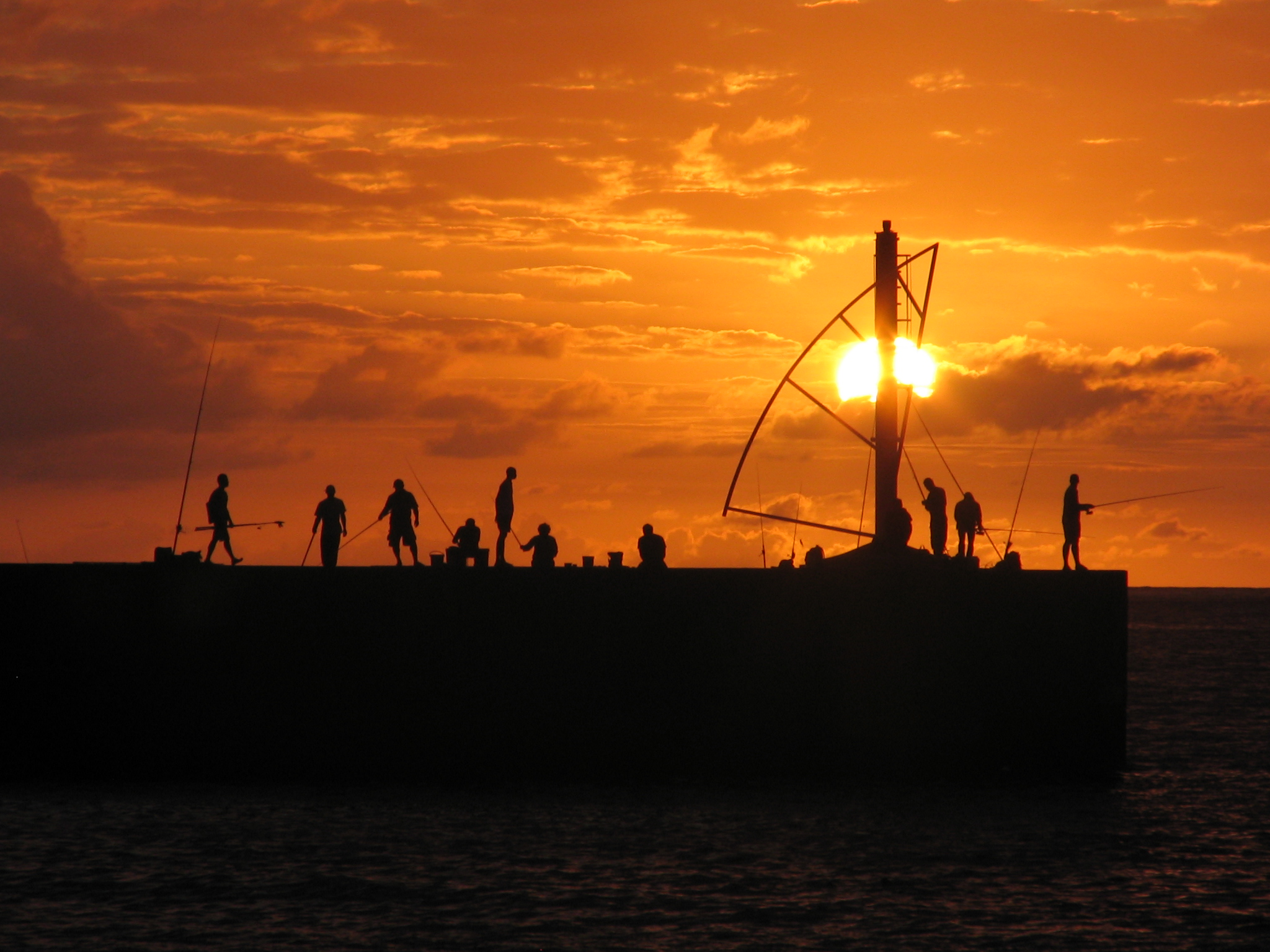
Sunset at Roches Noires Beach

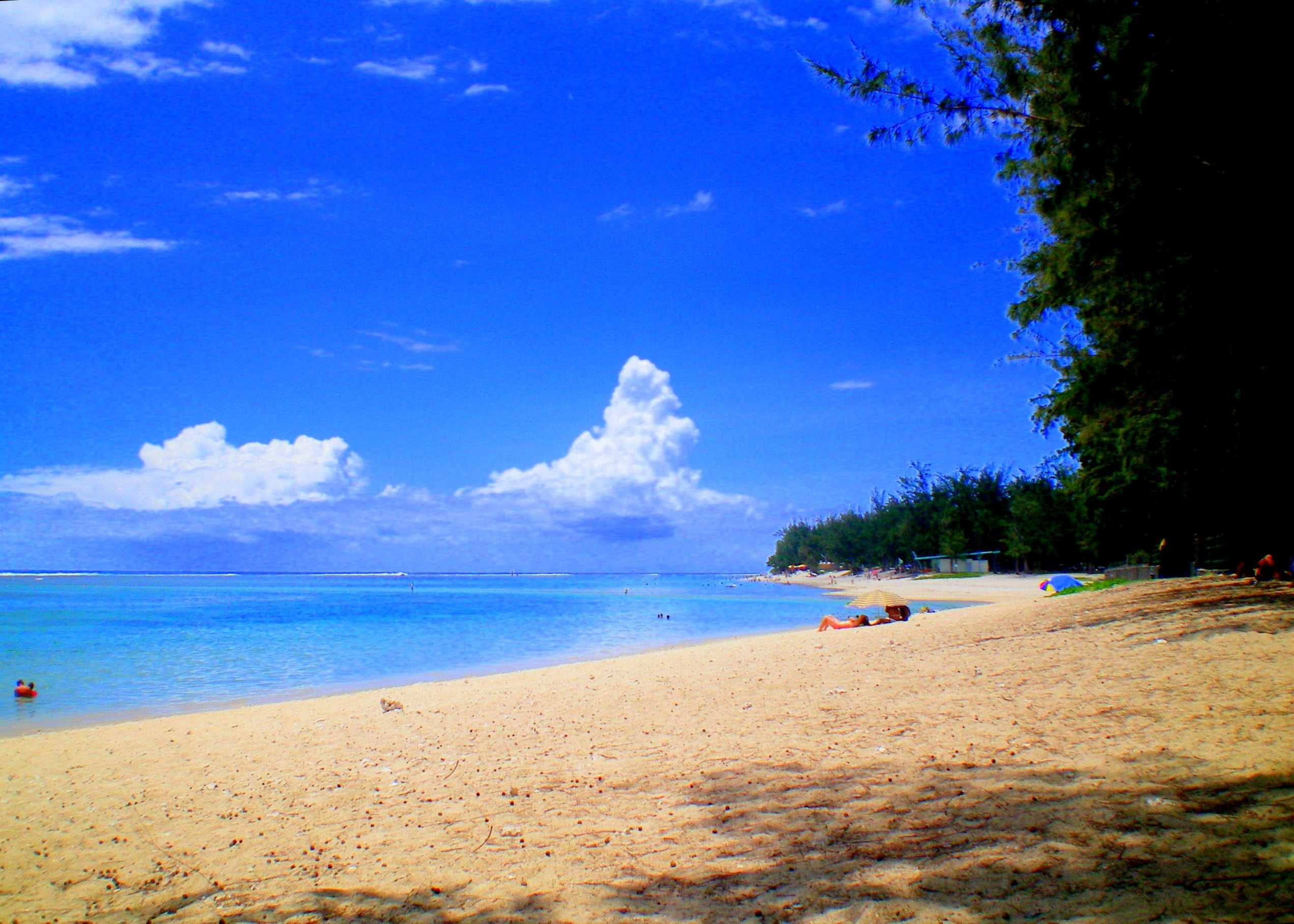
Beach of Hermitage

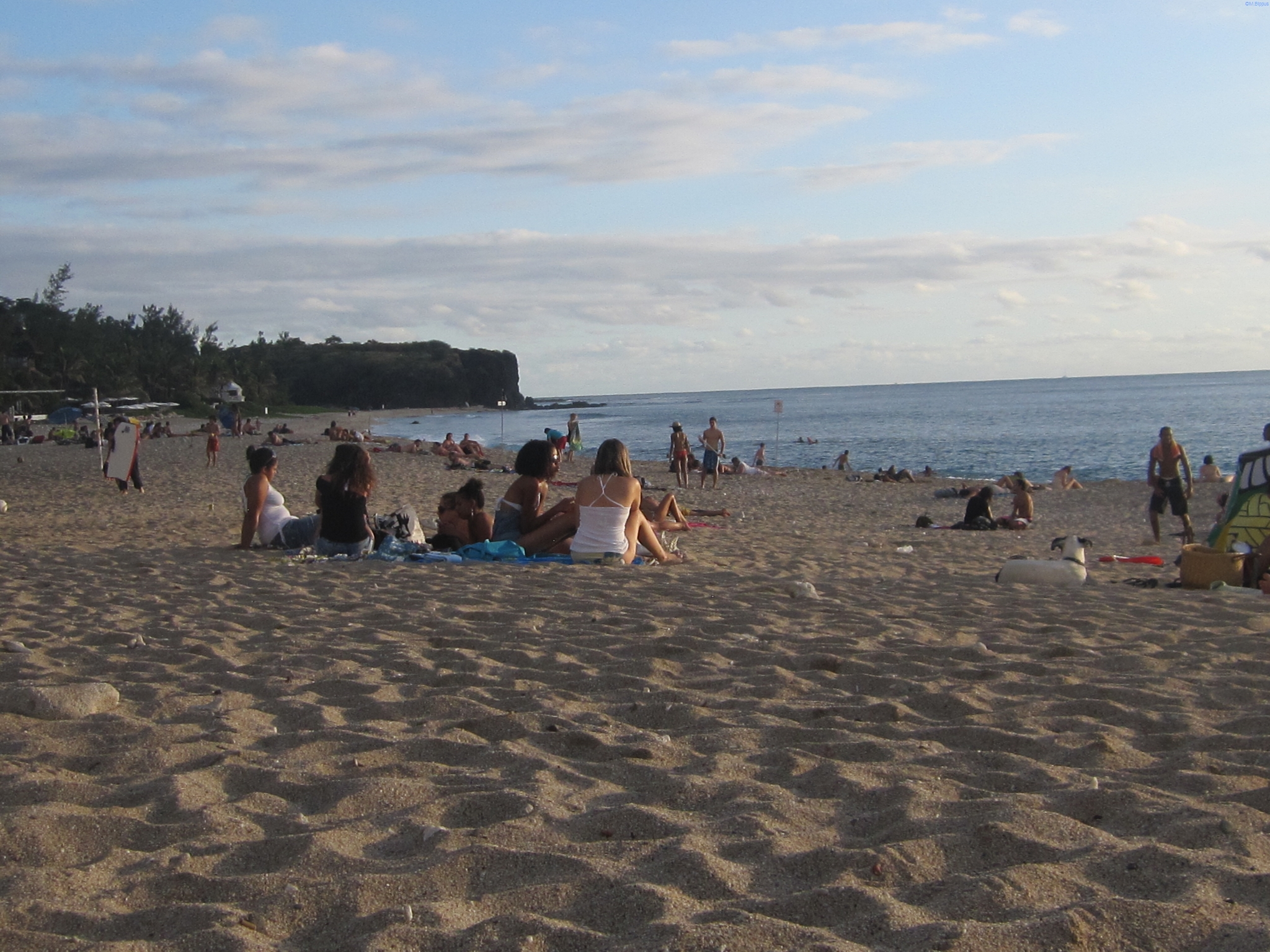
Beach of Boucan Canot

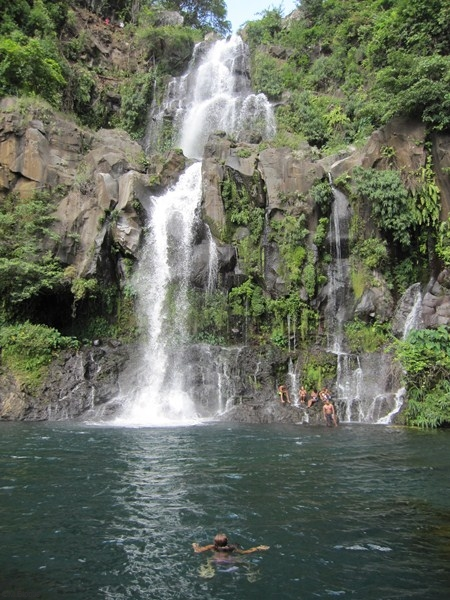
Waterfall at Bassin Aigrettes

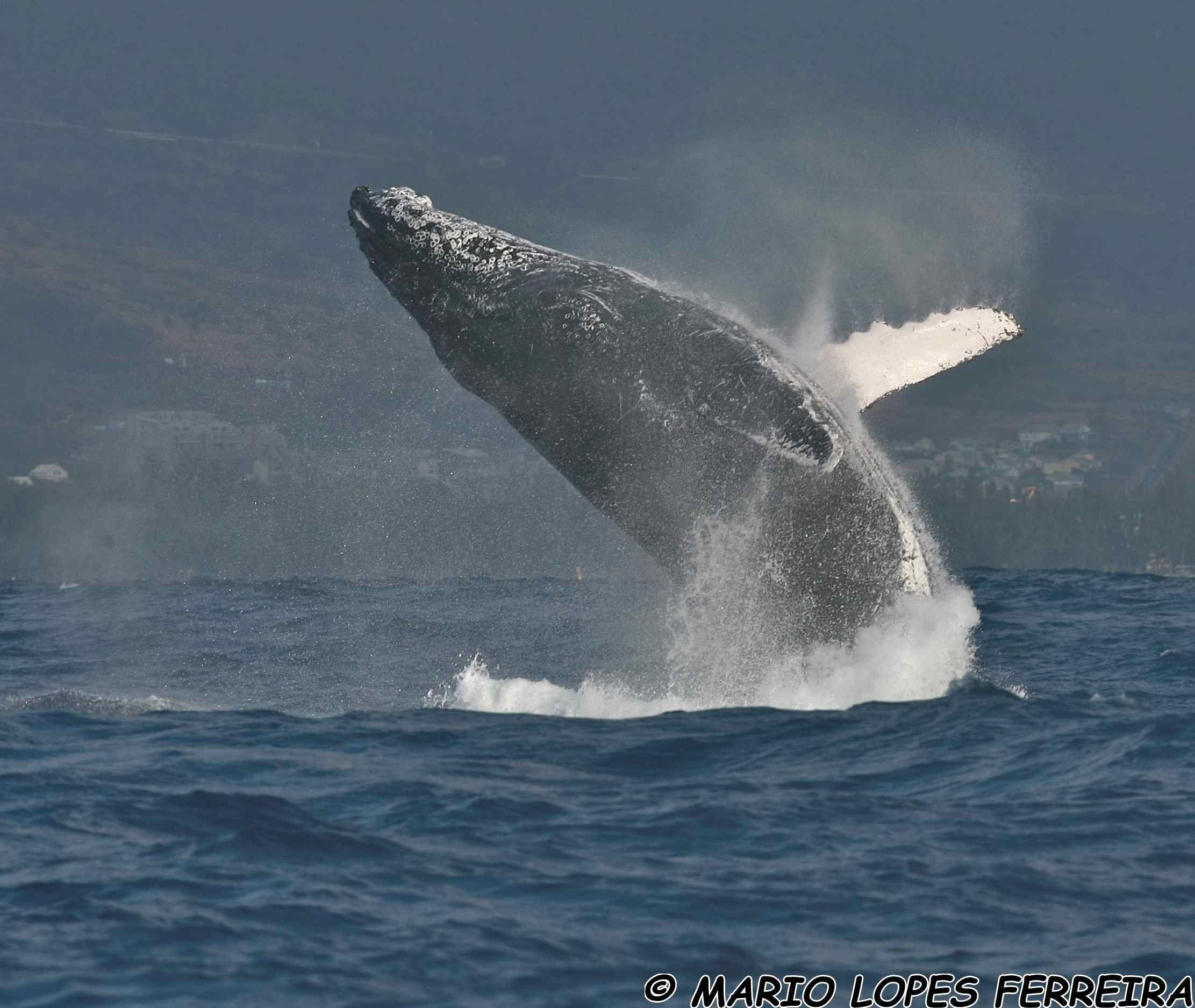

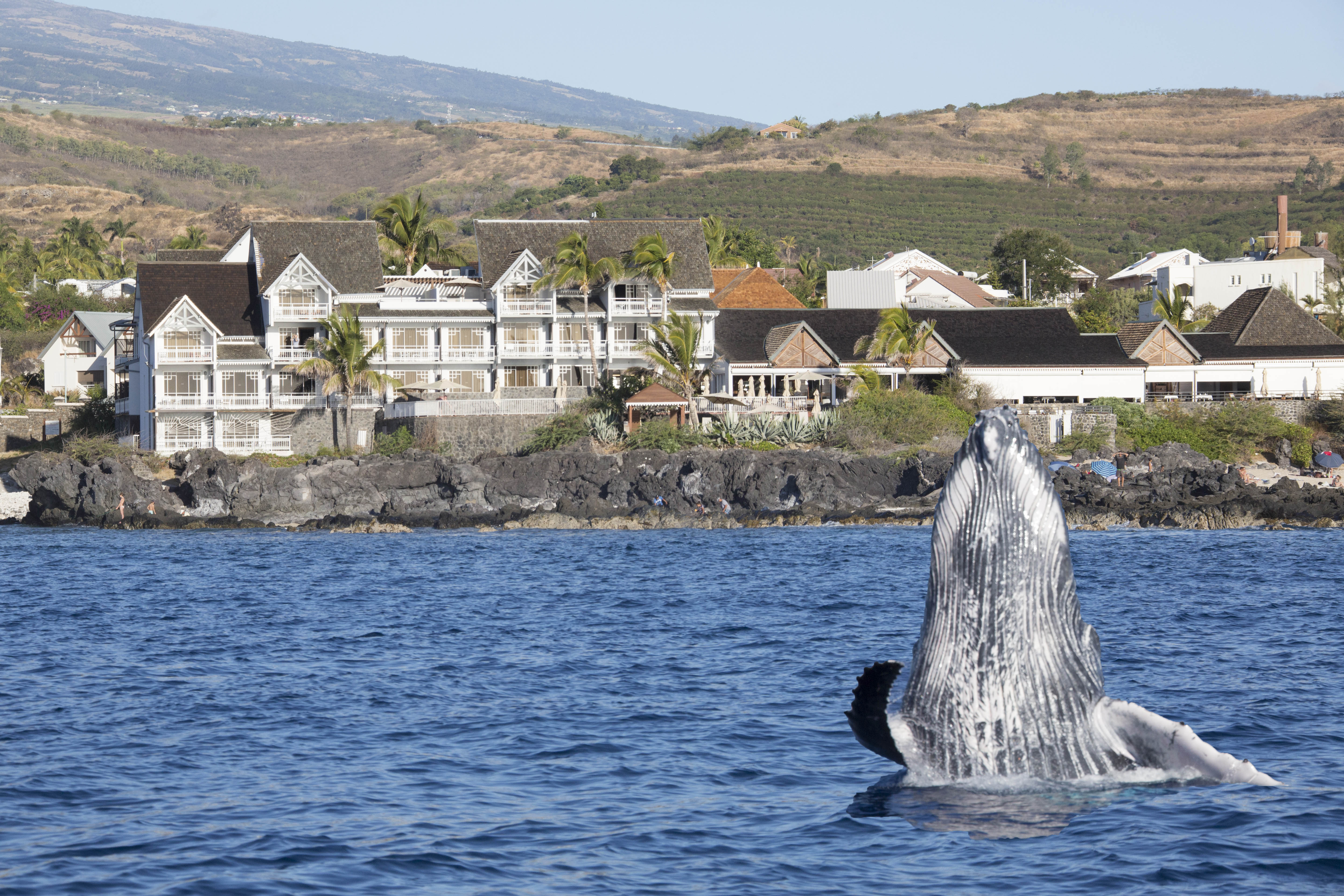

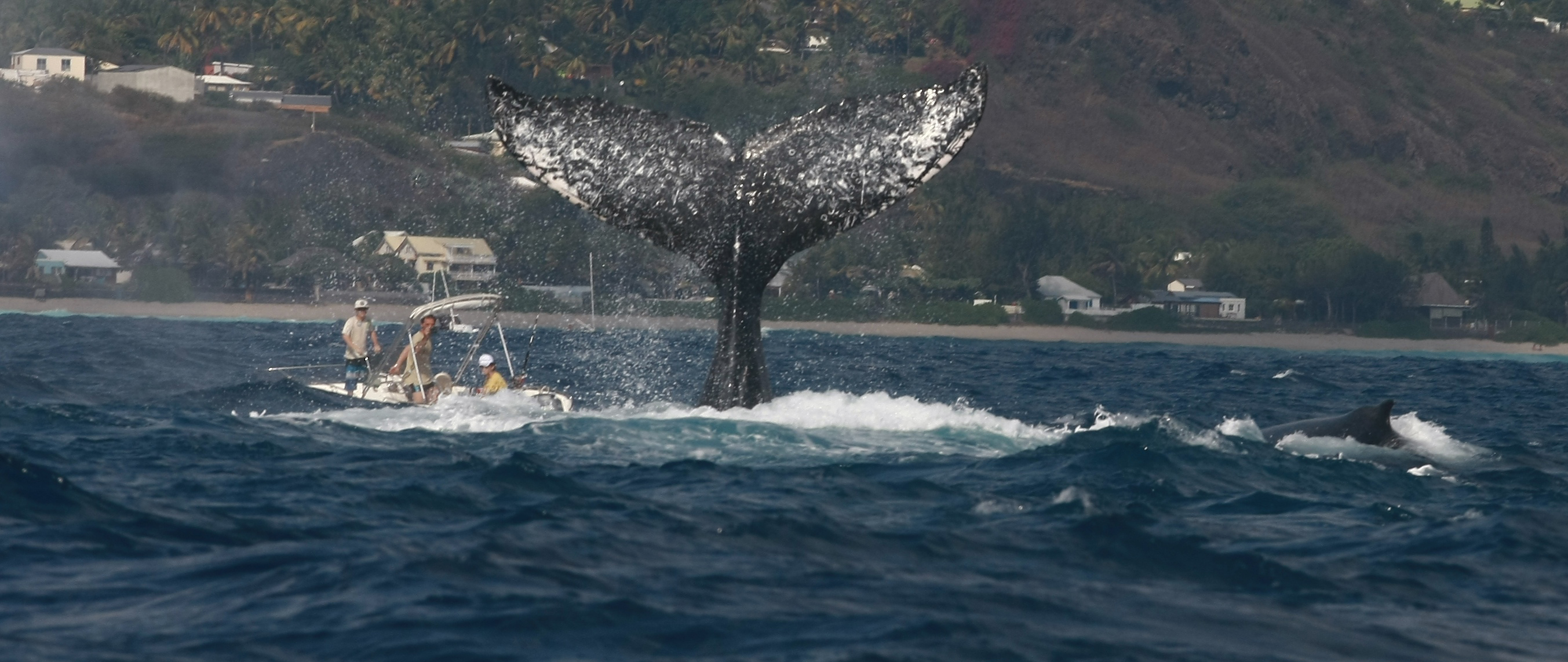

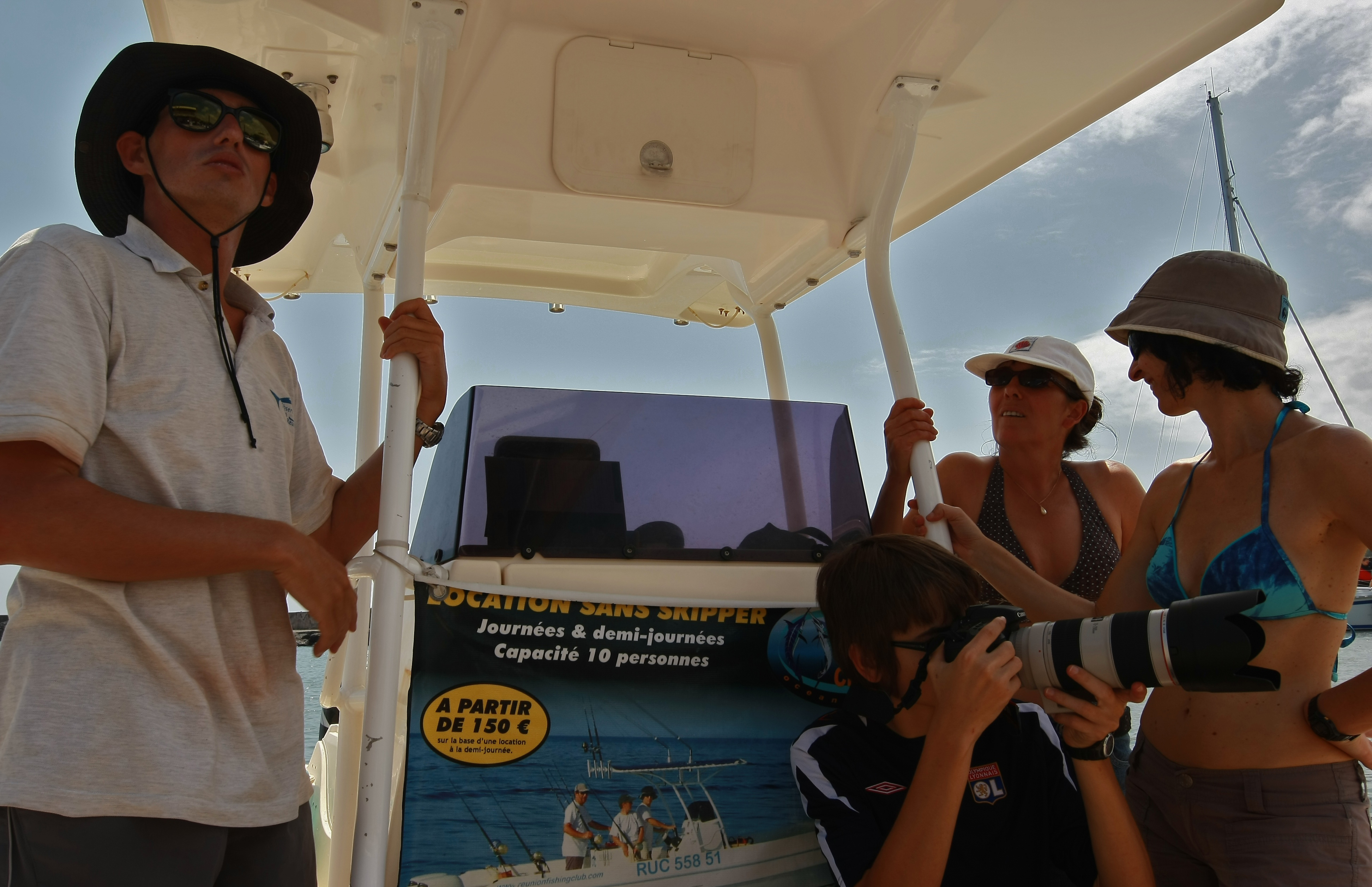
