= Giulia Gasparri =

Italian tennis and Beach player

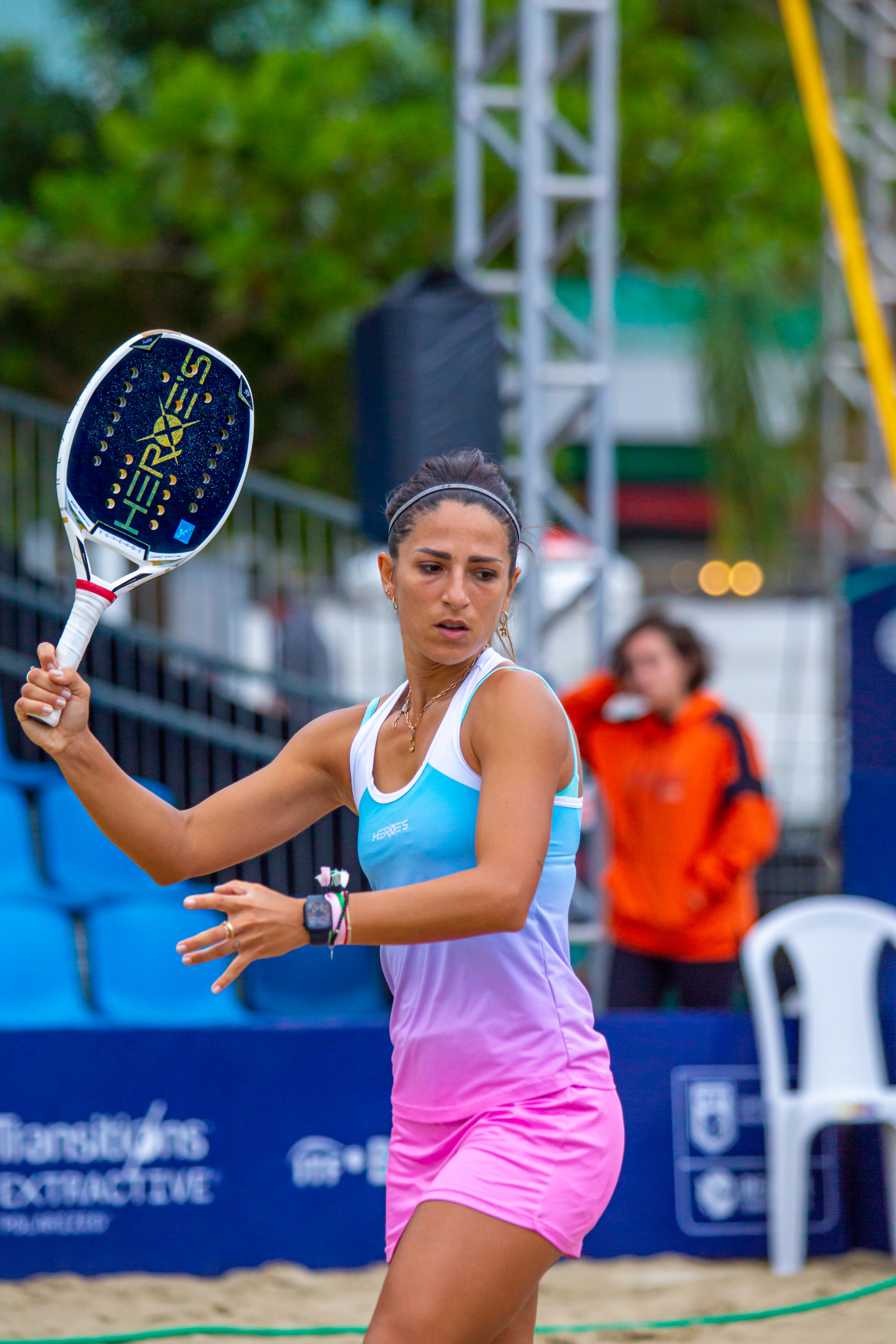
- Giulia at the BT400 Balneário Camboriú - April 2022
- Country (sports): Italy
- Born: 31 October 1991 (age 34)
- Retired: 2013
- Plays: Right (two-handed backhand)
- Prize money: $14,732

Singles
- Career record: 35–58
- Highest ranking: No. 608 (7 June 2010)

Doubles
- Career record: 35–35
- Highest ranking: No. 634 (18 October 2010)
Medal record
Women's Beach tennis
Representing Italy
Beach_Tennis_World_Championship
Winner	2017 Cervia
Winner	2018 Cervia
Winner	2021 Terracina
Winner	2022 Terracina
Runner-up	2016 Cervia
Runner-up	2019 Terracina

Giulia Gasparri (born 31 October 1991, Ravenna, Italy) is an Italian former professional tennis player. and currently a professional Beach tennis player. She currently ranks No. 1 on ITF Beach Tennis World Tour Ranking, sharing the position with her partner Ninny Valentini and lives in Rio de Janeiro.

== Tennis career ==
She has won two singles and doubles titles on the ITF Women's Circuit. On 7 June 2010, she reached her best singles ranking of world No. 608. On 18 October, she peaked at No. 634 in the doubles rankings. Gasparri retired from professional tennis in 2013 and decided to follow the beach tennis.

== Beach tennis career ==
Since 2014 she is a professional beach tennis player. On 19 September 2016, she reached her best ranking world No. 1 ranking. In 2017 and 2018 Giulia Gasparri and Federica Bacchetta defended their ITF Beach Tennis World Championships for a second straight year in Cervia.

In October 2017, Gasparri partnering Federica Bacchetta won the 2017 European Beach Tennis Championships in the final over Flaminia Daina and Sofia Cimatti (6–4, 4–6, 7–6) in Sozopol.

In September 2019, Gasparri partnering Sofia Cimatti won the 2019 European Beach Tennis Championships in the final over Flaminia Daina and Nicole Nobile (6–3, 2–6, 6–1) in Sozopol.

In 2021, she started playing with Ninny Valentini and won six titles including ITF World Championship in Terracina.

In 2022 Gasparri won five titles, all with Ninny Valentini. She has 42 ITF titles.
