= 2001 Thalgo Australian Women's Hardcourts =

Coordinates: 27.8717°S 153.3504°E

- Date: 31 December – 6 January 2001
- Edition: 5th
- Category: Tier III
- Draw: 30S / 16D
- Prize money: US$170,000
- Surface: Hard / outdoor
- Location: Queensland, Australia
- Venue: Hope Island Resort Tennis Centre

Champions

Singles
- (Belgium) Justine Henin

Doubles
- (Italy) Giulia Casoni / (Slovakia) Janette Husárová
- Australian Hard Court Championships

The 2001 Thalgo Australian Women's Hardcourts was a women's tennis tournament. It was played on outdoor hard courts at the Hope Island Resort Tennis Centre in Hope Island, Queensland, Australia and was part of the Tier III category of the 2001 WTA Tour. It was the fifth edition of the tournament and was held from 31 December 2000 through 6 January 2001. Eighth-seeded Justine Henin won the singles title and earned $27,000 first-prize money.

== Finals ==
=== Singles ===
(Belgium) Justine Henin defeated (Italy) Silvia Farina Elia 7–6^{(7–5)}, 6–4

- It was Henin's 1st title of the year and the 2nd of her career.

=== Doubles ===
(Italy) Giulia Casoni / (Slovakia) Janette Husárová defeated (United States) Katie Schlukebir / (United States) Meghann Shaughnessy 7–6^{(11–9)}, 7–5

- It was Casoni's only title of the year and the 2nd of her career. It was Husárová's 1st title of the year and the 6th of her career.

== Entrants ==
=== Seeds ===
Country	Player	Rank^{1}	Seed
ESP	Conchita Martínez	5	1
SUI	Patty Schnyder	25	2
CRO	Silvija Talaja	29	3
RUS	Tatiana Panova	34	4
ESP	Magüi Serna	37	5
USA	Meghann Shaughnessy	38	6
SVK	Henrieta Nagyová	40	7
BEL	Justine Henin	45	8

- Rankings are as of 25 December 2000.

=== Other entrants ===
The following players received wildcards into the singles main draw:

- (Australia) Evie Dominikovic
- (Australia) Christina Wheeler

The following players received entry from the qualifying draw:

- (Indonesia) Wynne Prakusya
- (Germany) Barbara Rittner
- (Russia) Lina Krasnoroutskaya
- (Germany) Gréta Arn
