= Beach tennis =

Tennis and volleyball combination

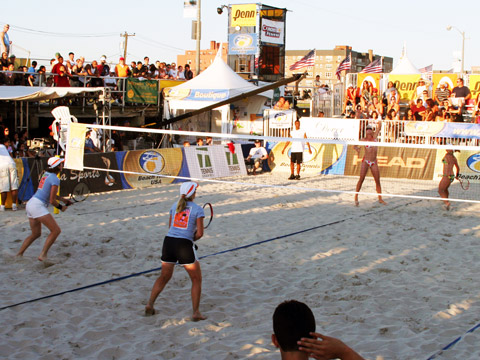
- Players on action
- Highest governing body: International Federation Beach Tennis (IFBT), Also International Tennis Federation
- First played: c. 1972 in Comacchio, Italy

Characteristics
- Contact: none
- Team members: singles and doubles
- Mixed-sex: yes, separate tours and mixed doubles
- Type: racket sport
- Equipment: rackets, balls and net
- Venue: outdoor

Presence
- Country or region: Worldwide

Beach tennis is a game combining elements of tennis and volleyball and played on a beach.

== Recognized ==
- First played 1972.
- First championship was played in 1976/1978.
- International Federation Beach Tennis (IFBT) was founded in 1995.
- International Tennis Federation (ITF) was recognized in 2008.

== Overview ==
Beach tennis is played in over 50 countries and by more than half a million people, with its greatest popularity occurring in Italy, Brazil and Spain. Beach tennis offers a highly aerobic cardio workout with low impact to the knees and joints because it is played on sand.

The sport preserves most of the rules and scoring of traditional tennis, but the ball is not allowed to touch the ground, and other modifications have been made to adapt to movement around the sand court and to the faster pace of the game. The game is played entirely with volleys, which makes for a quicker game than traditional tennis. Points start with a serve and end when the ball touches the ground, forcing players to dive to reach difficult plays in a similar manner used by volleyball players. The objective is to return the ball with only one hit so that it reaches the opposing side of the net.

A depressurized tennis ball, which travels more slowly through the air than does a regulation tennis ball, is used for beach tennis to allow for longer rallies. The sport is usually played by two-person teams on a regulation beach-volleyball court with a 5-foot-7-inch-high net.

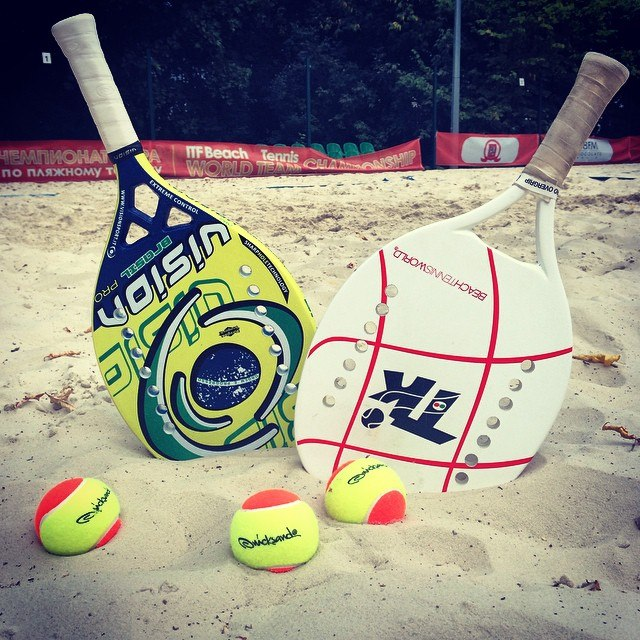
Beach tennis rackets and balls

== History ==
Beach tennis emerged in Italy in the early 1970s when tennis players on vacation in Lido degli Estensi, in the Ferrara town of Comacchio, played using their rackets and the existing volleyball nets already installed on the beach. The game was played for the first time with its current set of rules in Torredembarra, Spain in 1976. The first championship was played in Torredembarra in 1978. Since then (with few interruptions), it takes place on the same beach every year. Over the years, the sport spread to the beaches along the coast of Italy, and it is estimated that there are now more than 1,600 beach-tennis nets along the Italian coast in addition to a growing number of inland and indoor courts. There are an estimated 250,000 Italian beach tennis players.

== The international spread ==
Beach tennis arrived on the beaches of Rio de Janeiro around 2008, and the sport now dominates about one-third of the beach-volleyball courts along the Brazilian coast, and there are more than 50,000 beach tennis players in Brazil. Most Brazilian tennis clubs have converted, or are converting, at least one traditional tennis court into a few beach-tennis courts.

Though originally played only on beaches, beach tennis is now played at tennis clubs, indoor beach tennis/volleyball warehouses, country clubs, resorts, gyms and sand arenas.

The sport was recognized by the International Tennis Federation (ITF) in 2008. The ITF manages the most well-known and reputable international ranking of beach-tennis players. The ITF is allocating resources to the development of the sport and has set up exposition sand courts at professional tennis tournaments such as the Japan Open, Roland-Garros, the Australian Open and the US Open.

Top tennis players who have played beach tennis include Maria Sharapova, Andy Murray, the Bryan brothers, Rafael Nadal and Gustavo Kuerten.

The ITF also supports beach tennis by sanctioning tournaments. In 2013, the ITF began to organize regional and world championships. By 2015, 89 official sanctioned tournaments were held worldwide annually, and thousands more unofficial tournaments are held around the world each year. In 2015 the Pan-American games were held in Santos, São Paulo, Brazil, with participants from 16 countries. Also in 2015, a team championship tournament was held in Moscow with participants from 28 countries, with adult, junior, male and female teams

== In the United States ==
Beach tennis was formalized in the United States in 2005 by Marc Altheim, who discovered the sport on a trip to Aruba in 2003. The sport had been played there since 2000, having been introduced by a Dutchman. As of 2007, beach tennis had made progress toward acceptance as a mainstream sport, with an official standards organization known as Beach Tennis USA (BT USA). In 2007, BT USA reached television deals with the Tennis Channel and SNY, but the organization is no longer active. The Beach Tennis Association currently maintains player rankings and operates tournaments in Southern California.

== ITF Beach Tennis World Championship ==
=== Men's ===
Year (Note: Each year is linked to an article about that particular year's draw.)	Champion	Runner-up	Score in the final (Note: The dash means that the result or score is unknown because there are no available sources for this information. † indicates #1 ranking.)	Semifinalists
2009	(Italy) Riccardo De Filippi (Italy) Marco Ludovici	(Italy) Luca Meliconi (Italy) Paolo Tazzari	6–2, 6–2	(Italy) Stefano Fiore / (Italy) Luca Giavanni (Italy) Alan Maldini / (Italy) Cristiano Menighini
2010	(Italy) Alan Maldini (Italy) Luca Meliconi	(Italy) Massimiliano Corzani (Italy) Luigi Mazzarone	6–4, 6–2	(Italy) Francesco Ercoli / (Italy) Cristiano Menighini (Italy) Alessandro Calbucci / (Brazil) Alex Mingozzi
2011	(Italy) Alessandro Calbucci (Italy) Luca Meliconi	(Italy) Marco Ludovici (Italy) Gullio Petrucci	6–2, 6–1	(Italy) Michele Cappelletti / (Italy) Luca Carli (Italy) Fabrizio Avantaggiato / (Italy) Luca Cramarossa
2012	(Italy) Marco Garavini (Italy) Paolo Tazzari	(Italy) Alessandro Calbucci (Italy) Luca Meliconi	6–2, 7–6^{(4)}	(Italy) Marco Faccini / (Brazil) Alex Mingozzi (Italy) Luca Cramarossa / (Italy) Alex Maldini
2013	(Italy) Alessandro Calbucci (Italy) Marco Garavini	(Italy) Michele Cappelletti (Italy) Luca Carli	7–6^{(7)}, 6–0	(Italy) Luca Cramarossa / (Italy) Niccolo Strano (Italy) Matteo Marighella / (Italy) Luca Meliconi
2014	(Italy) Alessandro Calbucci (Italy) Marco Garavini	(Italy) Luca Cramarossa (Italy) Luca Meliconi	7–5, 6–2	(Italy) Matteo Marighella / (Italy) Niccolo Strano (Italy) Michele Cappelletti / (Italy) Luca Carli
2015	Not held			
2016	(Italy) Michele Cappelletti (Italy) Luca Carli	(Italy) Davide Benussi (Italy) Alessia Chiodoni	6–3, 6–1	(Russia) Nikita Burmakin / (Italy) Dennis Valmori (Brazil) Marcus Ferreira / (Brazil) Thales Santos
2017	(Italy) Michele Cappelletti (Italy) Luca Carli	(Italy) Luca Cramarossa (Italy) Marco Garavini	6–4, 6–1	(Italy) Doriano Beccacioli / (Italy) Davide Benussi (Brazil) Ralf Abreu / (Brazil) Diogo Carneiro
2018	(Italy) Mikael Alessi (Spain) Antomi Ramos	(Russia) Nikita Burmakin (Italy) Tomasso Giovannini	7–5, 7–6(5)	(Italy) Luca Cramarossa / (Italy) Marco Garavini (Italy) Michele Cappelletti / (Italy) Luca Carli
2019	(Italy) Alessandro Calbucci (Italy) Michele Cappelletti	(Russia) Nikita Burmakin (Italy) Tomasso Giovannini	6–3, 6–0	(Venezuela) Ramón Guédez / (Aruba) Aksel Samardzic (France) Nicolas Gianotti / (Spain) Antomi Ramos
2021	(Russia) Nikita Burmakin (Italy) Tomasso Giovannini	(Italy) Doriano Beccaccioli (Italy) Mattia Spoto	6–2, 4–6, [10–7]	(France) Nicolas Gianotti / (France) Théo Irigaray (Brazil) André Baran / (Brazil) Vinicius Font
2022	(Italy) Michele Cappelletti (Spain) Antomi Ramos	(France) Nicolas Gianotti (Italy) Mattia Spoto	3–6, 6–2, [10–7]	(Brazil) André Baran / (Russia) Nikita Burmakin (Brazil) Allan Oliveira / (Brazil) Thales Santos
2023	(Italy) Mattia Spoto (France) Nicolas Gianotti	(Italy) Michele Cappelletti (Spain) Antomi Ramos	7–5, 6–2	(Brazil) Thales Santos / (France) Théo Irigaray (Venezuela) Ramón Guédez / (Venezuela) Carlos Vigón
2024	(Brazil) André Baran (Italy) Michele Cappelletti	(France) Nicolas Gianotti (Italy) Mattia Spoto	6–2, 2–6, [10–6]	(Italy) Diego Bollettinari / (Venezuela) Carlos Vigón (France) Mathieu Guegano / (Brazil) Hugo Russo
2025	(France) Nicolas Gianotti (Italy) Mattia Spoto	(Brazil) André Baran (Brazil) Felipe Cogo Loch	6–3, 6–3	(Brazil) Fabrício Neis / (Brazil) Allan Oliveira (Italy) Niccolò Gasparri / (Italy) Gabriele Gini
2026	(France) Nicolas Gianotti (Italy) Mattia Spoto	(Brazil) Allan Oliveira (Spain) Antomi Ramos	6–1, 6–1	(Brazil) André Baran / (Italy) Michele Cappelletti (Italy) Alex Agirelli / (Italy) Alessandro Calbucci

=== Women's ===
Year	Champion	Runner-up	Score in the final	Semifinalists
2009	(Italy) Simona Briganti (Italy) Rosa Stefanelli	(Italy) Franca Bruschi (Italy) Laura Olivieri	1–6, 7–5, 6–2	(Brazil) Joana Cortez / (Brazil) Aline Sokolik (Italy) Claudia Di Marco / (Italy) Elena Vianello
2010	(Italy) Federica Bacchetta (Italy) Giulia Spazzoli	(Italy) Giorgia Gadoni (Italy) Rosa Stefanelli	3–6, 6–3, 6–1	(Italy) Simona Briganti / (Italy) Laura Olivieri (Italy) Simona Bonadonna / (Italy) Sara Petrolesi
2011	(Italy) Simona Briganti (Italy) Laura Olivieri	(Italy) Simona Bonadonna (Italy) Eva D'Elia	7–5, 6–4	(Italy) Federica Bacchetta / (Italy) Giulia Spazzoli (Brazil) Samanta Barijan / (Brazil) Joana Cortez
2012	(Italy) Simona Briganti (Italy) Laura Olivieri	(Italy) Federica Bacchetta (Italy) Giulia Spazzoli	6–4, 4–6, 6–4	(Italy) Sofia Cimatti / (Italy) Veronica Visani (Italy) Simona Bonadonna / (Italy) Eva D'Elia
2013	(Italy) Sofia Cimatti (Italy) Veronica Visani	(Italy) Giorgia Gadoni (Italy) Camilla Ponti	7–6^{(2)}, 7–6^{(4)}	(Italy) Arianna Carli / (Italy) Flaminia Daina (Venezuela) Patricia Díaz / (Italy) Natascia Sciolti
2014	(Italy) Federica Bacchetta (Italy) Sofia Cimatti	(Italy) Martina Corbara (Italy) Camilla Ponti	7–5, 4–6, 6–1	(Italy) Violante Battistella / (Italy) Michella Zanaboni (France) Marie-Eve Hoarau / (France) Mathilde Hoarau
2015	Not held			
2016	(Brazil) Joana Cortez (Brazil) Rafaella Miller	(Italy) Eva D'Elia (Italy) Giulia Gasparri	2–6, 6–2, 6–3	(Italy) Camilla Ponti / (Italy) Ninny Valentini (Russia) Daria Churakova / (Russia) Irina Glimakova
2017	(Italy) Federica Bacchetta (Italy) Giulia Gasparri	(Italy) Sofia Cimatti (Italy) Flaminia Daina	6–3, 5–7, 6–4	(Italy) Eva D'Elia / (Italy) Veronica Visani (Brazil) Joana Cortez / (Brazil) Rafaella Miller
2018	(Italy) Federica Bacchetta (Italy) Giulia Gasparri	(Italy) Sofia Cimatti (Italy) Flaminia Daina	2–6, 6–4, 6–3	(Germany) Maraike Biglmaier / (Brazil) Rafaella Miller (Italy) Eva D'Elia / (Italy) Veronica Visani
2019	(Germany) Maraike Biglmaier (Brazil) Rafaella Miller	(Italy) Sofia Cimatti (Italy) Giulia Gasparri	6–3, 1–6, 7–5	(Italy) Eva D'Elia / (Italy) Veronica Visani (Italy) Flaminia Daina / (Italy) Nicole Nobile
2020	Not held			
2021	(Italy) Giulia Gasparri (Italy) Ninny Valentini	(Venezuela) Patricia Díaz (Brazil) Rafaella Miller	6–2, 6–3	(Italy) Sofia Cimatti / (Italy) Nicole Nobile (Brazil) Joana Cortez / (Italy) Flaminia Daina
2022	(Italy) Giulia Gasparri (Italy) Ninny Valentini	(Venezuela) Patricia Díaz (Brazil) Rafaella Miller	7–5, 6–4	(Brazil) Vitoria Marchezini / (Brazil) Marcela Vita (Italy) Sofia Cimatti / (Italy) Nicole Nobile
2023	(Venezuela) Patricia Díaz (Brazil) Rafaella Miller	(Spain) Ariadna Costa (Italy) Elena Francesconi	6–1, 6–1	(Brazil) Julia Nogueira / (Brazil) Marcela Vita (Italy) Veronica Casadei / (Italy) Greta Giusti
2024	(Venezuela) Patricia Díaz (Brazil) Rafaella Miller	(Italy) Giulia Gasparri (Italy) Ninny Valentini	7–5, 6–4	Elizaveta Kudinova / Anastasiia Semenova (Italy) Veronica Casadei / (Spain) Ariadna Costa
2025	Elizaveta Kudinova; Anastasiia Semenova	(Venezuela) Patricia Díaz (Brazil) Rafaella Miller	7–5, 6–4	(Italy) Giulia Gasparri / (Italy) Ninny Valentini (Italy) Veronica Casadei / (Spain) Ariadna Costa
2026	Elizaveta Kudinova; Anastasiia Semenova	(Italy) Giulia Gasparri (Italy) Ninny Valentini	6–4, 6–3	(Italy) Sofia Cimatti / (Italy) Flaminia Daina (Italy) Giulia Trippa / (Brazil) Marcela Vita

=== Mixed ===
Year	Champion	Runner-up	Score in the final	3rd place
2025	(Italy) Ninny Valentini (Brazil) Fabricio Neis	(Brazil) Vitoria Marchezini (Brazil) Leonardo Garrosino	4-1, 2-4, 12-10	(Spain) Ariadna Costa (Italy) Diego Bollettinari
2026	(Italy) Ninny Valentini (Brazil) André Baran	(Brazil) Vitoria Marchezini (Brazil) Fabrício Neis	6–3, 1–6, 10–7	Elizaveta Kudinova / (Brazil) Daniel Mola; Angelina Klimuk / Mikhail Makarov

== ITF Beach Tennis World Cup ==
Event	Gold	Silver	Bronze
2012	Italy	Brazil	Spain
2013	Brazil	Italy	Russia
2014	Italy	Brazil	Russia
2015	Italy	Russia	Spain
2016	Russia	Italy	France
2017	Italy	Brazil	Russia
2018	Brazil	Italy	Russia
2019	Brazil	Russia	Italy
2021	Brazil	Italy	Spain
2022	Italy	Brazil	Venezuela
2023	Italy + Brazil		Spain
2024	Italy	Spain	Brazil
2025	Spain	Brazil	France

== See also ==
- ITF Beach Tennis Tour
