= Beach Tennis World Tour =

Beach tennis contest

- Highest governing body: World Tennis
- First played: 2008

Characteristics
- Mixed-sex: Yes

Presence
- World Championships: Yes

The Beach Tennis World Tour is a beach tennis contest organized by World Tennis. It began in 2008, and has seen an increase of nearly six times in the number of tournaments on the Beach Tour calendar.

== Points ==
Players are ranked according to total number of points attained. Points are awarded throughout each tournament as follows:

| | World Championships | Regional Championships | | Grade Events | | | |
| Grade | A | B1 | B2 | 1 | 2 | 3 | 4 |
|---|---|---|---|---|---|---|---|
| Winner | 250 | 180 | 80 | 150 | 100 | 60 | 40 |
| Runner-up | 180 | 120 | 50 | 100 | 75 | 45 | 30 |
| Semi-finalists | 120 | 80 | 30 | 80 | 50 | 30 | 20 |
| Quarter-finalists | 80 | 50 | 15 | 60 | 30 | 20 | 15 |
| Losers in last 16 | 50 | 30 | 5 | 30 | 20 | 15 | 10 |
| Losers in last 32 | 30 | | | 20 | | | |
